= 2021 Segunda División play-offs =

Football competition

Segunda División play-offs
- Season: 2020–21
- Promoted: Rayo Vallecano
- Matches: 6
- Goals: 14 (2.33 per match)

The 2020–21 Segunda División play-offs were played from 2 June to 20 June 2021 and determined the third team promoted to La Liga for the following season. Teams placed between 3rd and 6th position took part in the promotion play-offs.

== Regulations ==
The regulations were the same as the previous season: in the semi-finals, the fifth-placed team faced the fourth-placed team, while the sixth-placed team faced the third. Each tie was played over two legs, with the team lower in the table hosting the first leg.

The team that scored more goals on aggregate over the two legs advanced to the next round. If the aggregate score was level, the away goals rule was applied (i.e., the team that scored more goals away from home over the two legs advanced). If away goals were also equal, then thirty minutes of extra time would be played. The away goals rule would again be applied after extra time (i.e., if there were goals scored during extra time and the aggregate score was still level, the visiting team advanced by virtue of more away goals scored). If no goals were scored during extra time, the winner would be the best positioned team in the regular season.

== Road to the play-offs ==
Pos	Team	Pld	W	D	L	GF	GA	GD	Pts	Promotion, qualification or relegation
3	Leganés	42	21	10	11	51	32	+19	73 (Note: Head-to-head points: Leganés: 4, Almería: 1)	Qualification for promotion play-offs
4	Almería	42	21	10	11	61	40	+21	73	Qualification for promotion play-offs
5	Girona	42	20	11	11	47	36	+11	71	Qualification for promotion play-offs
6	Rayo Vallecano (O, P)	42	19	10	13	52	40	+12	67	Qualification for promotion play-offs

Source: LaLiga
Rules for classification: 1) points; 2) head-to-head points; 3) head-to-head goal difference; 4) goal difference; 5) number of goals scored
(O) Play-off winners; (P) Promoted

== Bracket ==
Semi-finals
6	Rayo Vallecano	3	2	5
3	Leganés	0	1	1
5	Girona	3	0	3
4	Almería	0	0	0

Final
6	Rayo Vallecano	1	2	3
5	Girona	2	0	2

=== Semi-finals ===
Team 1	Agg.	Team 2	1st leg	2nd leg
Rayo Vallecano	5–1	Leganés	3–0	2–1
Girona	3–0	Almería	3–0	0–0

==== First legs ====
2 June 2021
21:00 (CEST)

Girona	3–0	Almería
Bárcenas 3'; Couto 5'; Sylla 65'	Report

Montilivi, Girona
Attendance: 1,500
Referee: Alejandro Muñiz Ruiz

Girona	Almería

GK	1	(Spain) Juan Carlos
LCB	38	(Spain) Arnau Martínez
CB	15	(Spain) Juanpe (c)	(yellow card) 52'
RCB	22	(Uruguay) Santi Bueno
LWB	3	(Spain) Enric Franquesa	(yellow card) 54'	(substituted off) 80'
LCM	14	(Spain) Monchu
CM	8	(Uruguay) Sebastián Cristóforo		(substituted off) 80'
RCM	24	(Spain) Gerard Gumbau		(substituted off) 64'
RWB	16	(Brazil) Yan Couto
CF	18	(Senegal) Mamadou Sylla		(substituted off) 88'
CF	23	(Panama) Yoel Bárcenas		(substituted off) 80'
Substitutions:
GK	13	(Spain) Adrián Ortolá
DF	17	(Spain) Jordi Calavera
DF	2	(Colombia) Bernardo Espinosa
FW	35	(Spain) Pau Víctor
MF	26	(Mali) Ibrahima Kebé		(substituted on) 64'
MF	27	(Spain) Ramon Terrats		(substituted on) 80'
MF	20	(Spain) Valery
DF	21	(Spain) Antonio Luna
FW	19	(Spain) Pablo Moreno		(substituted on) 84'
FW	9	(Argentina) Nahuel Bustos		(substituted on) 80'
MF	10	(Spain) Samu Sáiz
MF	11	(Spain) Aday		(substituted on) 80'
Manager:
(Spain) Francisco

GK	1	(Georgia (country)) Giorgi Makaridze	(yellow card) 85'
LB	15	(Spain) Sergio Akieme
CB	21	(Spain) Chumi
CB	18	(Serbia) Nikola Maraš		(substituted off) 46'
RB	20	(Albania) Iván Balliu	(yellow card) 27'
CM	5	(Spain) Manu Morlanes
CM	6	(Spain) César de la Hoz (c)
LW	16	(Spain) José Carlos Lazo		(substituted off) 65'
AM	19	(Portugal) João Carvalho		(substituted off) 46'
RW	32	(Belgium) Largie Ramazani	(yellow card) 30'	(substituted off) 74'
CF	9	(Nigeria) Umar Sadiq
Substitutions:
GK	13	(Spain) Fernando
DF	2	(Spain) Aitor Buñuel
MF	23	(Spain) Fran Villalba
MF	25	(Portugal) Ivanildo
MF	22	(Portugal) Samú		(substituted on) 46'
MF	14	(Argentina) Lucas Robertone
MF	17	(Spain) José Corpas		(substituted on) 65'
DF	12	(Spain) Álex Centelles
FW	4	(Brazil) Guilherme Schettine
FW	7	(Spain) Juan Villar		(substituted on) 74'
MF	10	(Spain) Ager Aketxe		(substituted on) 46'
MF	8	(Serbia) Radosav Petrović
Manager:
(Spain) Rubi

3 June 2021
21:00 (CEST)

Rayo Vallecano	3–0	Leganés
A. García 73'; Bebé 76', 90+4'	Report

Campo de Vallecas, Madrid
Attendance: 847
Referee: Luis Milla Alvendiz

Rayo Vallecano	Leganés

GK	1	(France) Luca Zidane
LB	33	(Spain) Fran García
CB	5	(Spain) Alejandro Catena	(yellow card) 37'
CB	24	(Montenegro) Esteban Saveljich	(yellow card) 56'
RB	28	(Spain) Mario Hernández		(substituted off) 81'
LCM	23	(Spain) Óscar Valentín		(substituted off) 81'
RCM	6	(Spain) Santi Comesaña
LW	18	(Spain) Álvaro García
AM	8	(Argentina) Óscar Trejo (c)	(yellow card) 51'	(substituted off) 88'
RW	7	(Spain) Isi Palazón
CF	14	(Morocco) Yacine Qasmi		(substituted off) 65'
Substitutions:
GK	30	(Spain) Miguel Morro
DF	2	(Uruguay) Emiliano Velázquez		(substituted on) 81'
DF	3	(Spain) Iván Martos
DF	27	(Spain) Martín Pascual
MF	4	(Spain) Mario Suárez		(substituted on) 81'
MF	10	(Portugal) Bebé		(substituted on) 65'
MF	22	(Spain) José Pozo
MF	39	(Spain) Manu Navarro
FW	9	(Argentina) Leo Ulloa
FW	11	(Spain) Andrés Martín		(substituted on) 88'
FW	15	(Spain) Antoñín
FW	19	(Spain) Miguel Ángel Guerrero
Manager:
(Spain) Andoni Iraola

GK	13	(Spain) Asier Riesgo
LB	5	(Argentina) Jonathan Silva
CB	28	(Spain) Javi Hernández
CB	6	(Spain) Sergio González
RB	2	(Spain) Sergi Palencia
LW	9	(Spain) Sabin Merino		(substituted off) 77'
LDM	21	(Spain) Rubén Pérez (c)	(yellow card) 79'
CM	19	(Spain) Luis Perea		(substituted off) 85'
RW	14	(Spain) Javier Avilés		(substituted off) 77'
CF	29	(Spain) Miguel de la Fuente	(yellow card) 90+3'
CF	11	(Spain) Juan Muñoz		(substituted off) 67'
Substitutions:
GK	1	(Spain) Iván Cuéllar
GK	30	(Spain) Diego Conde
DF	4	(Nigeria) Kenneth Omeruo
DF	14	(Spain) Rodrigo Tarín
DF	20	(Spain) Ignasi Miquel
DF	27	(Spain) Mario del Campo
MF	17	(Spain) Javier Eraso		(substituted on) 67'
MF	18	(Spain) Róber Ibáñez		(substituted on) 77'
MF	22	(Switzerland) Kevin Bua		(substituted on) 77'
MF	25	(Spain) Rubén Pardo
FW	24	(Spain) Borja Bastón		(substituted on) 85'
FW	32	(Spain) Diego García
Manager:
(Spain) Asier Garitano

==== Second legs ====
5 June 2021
16:00 (CEST)

Almería	0–0	Girona
	Report

Juegos Mediterráneos, Almería
Referee: Miguel Ángel Ortiz Arias

Almería	Girona

GK	13	(Spain) Fernando (c)
LB	12	(Spain) Álex Centelles		(substituted off) 46'
CB	21	(Spain) Chumi
CB	25	(Portugal) Ivanildo	(yellow card) 39'
RB	2	(Spain) Aitor Buñuel	(yellow card) 43'	(substituted off) 46'
CM	5	(Spain) Manu Morlanes
CM	22	(Portugal) Samú	(yellow card) 56'	(substituted off) 70'
LW	32	(Belgium) Largie Ramazani
AM	10	(Spain) Ager Aketxe		(substituted off) 46'
RW	7	(Spain) Juan Villar		(substituted off) 46'
CF	9	(Nigeria) Umar Sadiq
Substitutions:
GK	1	(Georgia (country)) Giorgi Makaridze
DF	15	(Spain) Sergio Akieme		(substituted on) 46'
DF	18	(Serbia) Nikola Maraš
DF	20	(Albania) Iván Balliu		(substituted on) 46'
MF	6	(Spain) César de la Hoz
MF	8	(Serbia) Radosav Petrović
MF	14	(Argentina) Lucas Robertone	(yellow card) 52'	(substituted on) 46'
MF	16	(Spain) José Carlos Lazo		(substituted on) 70'
MF	17	(Spain) José Corpas		(substituted on) 46'
MF	19	(Portugal) João Carvalho
MF	23	(Spain) Fran Villalba
FW	4	(Brazil) Guilherme Schettine
Manager:
(Spain) Rubi

GK	1	(Spain) Juan Carlos
LCB	38	(Spain) Arnau Martínez
CB	15	(Spain) Juanpe (c)	(yellow card) 52'
RCB	22	(Uruguay) Santi Bueno
LWB	3	(Spain) Enric Franquesa		(substituted off) 81'
LCM	14	(Spain) Monchu
CM	8	(Uruguay) Sebastián Cristóforo		(substituted off) 54'
RCM	24	(Spain) Gerard Gumbau		(substituted off) 54'
RWB	16	(Brazil) Yan Couto		(substituted off) 80'
CF	18	(Senegal) Mamadou Sylla	(yellow card) 89'
CF	23	(Panama) Yoel Bárcenas		(substituted off) 58'
Substitutions:
GK	13	(Spain) Adrián Ortolá
GK	30	(Spain) Jona Morilla
DF	2	(Colombia) Bernardo Espinosa
DF	17	(Spain) Jordi Calavera
DF	21	(Spain) Antonio Luna		(substituted on) 81'
MF	10	(Spain) Samu Sáiz
MF	11	(Spain) Aday		(substituted on) 80'
MF	26	(Mali) Ibrahima Kebe	(yellow card) 67'	(substituted on) 54'
MF	27	(Spain) Ramon Terrats		(substituted on) 54'
FW	9	(Argentina) Nahuel Bustos		(substituted on) 68'
FW	35	(Spain) Pau Víctor
Manager:
(Spain) Francisco

6 June 2021
16:00 (CEST)

Leganés	1–2	Rayo Vallecano
Rober 11'	Report	Sergio 67' (o.g.); Martín 80'

Municipal de Butarque, Leganés
Referee: José Antonio López Toca

Leganés	Rayo Vallecano

GK	13	(Spain) Asier Riesgo
LB	5	(Argentina) Jonathan Silva		(substituted off) 53'
CB	28	(Spain) Javi Hernández	(yellow card) 83'
CB	4	(Nigeria) Kenneth Omeruo
RB	2	(Spain) Sergi Palencia
LW	22	(Switzerland) Kevin Bua		(substituted off) 62'
LCM	21	(Spain) Rubén Pérez (c)	(yellow card) 24'	(substituted off) 75'
RCM	25	(Spain) Rubén Pardo
RW	18	(Spain) Róber Ibáñez		(substituted off) 75'
CF	29	(Spain) Miguel de la Fuente
CF	11	(Spain) Juan Muñoz		(substituted off) 62'
Substitutions:
GK	1	(Spain) Iván Cuéllar
DF	6	(Spain) Sergio González	(yellow card) 66'	(substituted on) 53'
DF	15	(Spain) Rodrigo Tarín
DF	20	(Spain) Ignasi Miquel
DF	27	(Spain) Mario del Campo
MF	14	(Spain) Javier Avilés		(substituted on) 62'
MF	17	(Spain) Javier Eraso		(substituted on) 62'
MF	19	(Spain) Luis Perea
FW	7	(Spain) Brandon
FW	9	(Spain) Sabin Merino		(substituted on) 75'
FW	24	(Spain) Borja Bastón
FW	32	(Spain) Diego García		(substituted on) 75'
Manager:
(Spain) Asier Garitano

GK	1	(France) Luca Zidane
LB	33	(Spain) Fran García
CB	5	(Spain) Alejandro Catena	(yellow card) 14'
CB	24	(Montenegro) Esteban Saveljich	(yellow card) 4'	(substituted off) 46'
RB	28	(Spain) Mario Hernández
LCM	23	(Spain) Óscar Valentín		(substituted off) 76'
RCM	6	(Spain) Santi Comesaña
LW	18	(Spain) Álvaro García		(substituted off) 76'
AM	8	(Argentina) Óscar Trejo (c)		(substituted off) 83'
RW	7	(Spain) Isi Palazón
CF	14	(Morocco) Yacine Qasmi		(substituted off) 58'
Substitutions:
GK	30	(Spain) Miguel Morro
DF	2	(Uruguay) Emiliano Velázquez		(substituted on) 46'
DF	3	(Spain) Iván Martos		(substituted on) 76'
DF	27	(Spain) Martín Pascual
MF	4	(Spain) Mario Suárez		(substituted on) 76'
MF	10	(Portugal) Bebé
MF	22	(Spain) José Pozo
MF	39	(Spain) Manu Navarro
FW	9	(Argentina) Leo Ulloa
FW	11	(Spain) Andrés Martín		(substituted on) 58'
FW	15	(Spain) Antoñín		(substituted on) 83'
FW	19	(Spain) Miguel Ángel Guerrero
Manager:
(Spain) Andoni Iraola

=== Finals ===
Team 1	Agg.	Team 2	1st leg	2nd leg
Rayo Vallecano	3–2	Girona	1–2	2–0

==== First leg ====
13 June 2021
16:00 (CEST)

Rayo Vallecano	1–2	Girona
Isi 6'	Report	Franquesa 41'; Sylla 46'

Campo de Vallecas, Madrid
Referee: Juan Luis Pulido Santana

Rayo Vallecano	Girona

GK	1	(France) Luca Zidane
LB	33	(Spain) Fran García
CB	5	(Spain) Alejandro Catena
CB	24	(Montenegro) Esteban Saveljich
RB	17	(Peru) Luis Advíncula
LCM	23	(Spain) Óscar Valentín		(substituted off) 80'
RCM	6	(Spain) Santi Comesaña
LW	18	(Spain) Álvaro García		(substituted off) 88'
AM	8	(Argentina) Óscar Trejo (c)	(yellow card) 52'
RW	7	(Spain) Isi Palazón		(substituted off) 80'
CF	14	(Morocco) Yacine Qasmi		(substituted off) 61'
Substitutions:
GK	30	(Spain) Miguel Morro
DF	2	(Uruguay) Emiliano Velázquez
DF	3	(Spain) Iván Martos
DF	27	(Spain) Martín Pascual
DF	28	(Spain) Mario Hernández
MF	4	(Spain) Mario Suárez
MF	10	(Portugal) Bebé	(yellow card) 90+8'	(substituted on) 61'
MF	22	(Spain) José Pozo		(substituted on) 88'
FW	9	(Argentina) Leo Ulloa		(substituted on) 80'
FW	11	(Spain) Andrés Martín		(substituted on) 80'
FW	15	(Spain) Antoñín
FW	19	(Spain) Miguel Ángel Guerrero
Manager:
(Spain) Andoni Iraola

GK	1	(Spain) Juan Carlos	(yellow card) 69'
LCB	38	(Spain) Arnau Martínez	(yellow card) 77'
CB	15	(Spain) Juanpe (c)
RCB	22	(Uruguay) Santi Bueno
LWB	3	(Spain) Enric Franquesa
LCM	14	(Spain) Monchu
CM	8	(Uruguay) Sebastián Cristóforo	(yellow card) 60'	(substituted off) 65'
RCM	24	(Spain) Gerard Gumbau		(substituted off) 76'
RWB	16	(Brazil) Yan Couto		(substituted off) 76'
CF	18	(Senegal) Mamadou Sylla		(substituted off) 82'
CF	9	(Argentina) Nahuel Bustos		(substituted off) 65'
Substitutions:
GK	13	(Spain) Adrián Ortolá
GK	30	(Spain) Jona Morilla
DF	2	(Colombia) Bernardo Espinosa
DF	17	(Spain) Jordi Calavera		(substituted on) 76'
DF	21	(Spain) Antonio Luna
MF	10	(Spain) Samu Sáiz	(yellow card) 45+3'
MF	20	(Spain) Valery Fernández		(substituted on) 82'
MF	26	(Mali) Ibrahima Kebe		(substituted on) 76'
MF	27	(Spain) Ramon Terrats		(substituted on) 65'
FW	7	(Uruguay) Cristhian Stuani		(substituted on) 65'
FW	19	(Spain) Pablo Moreno
FW	35	(Spain) Pau Víctor
Manager:
(Spain) Francisco

=== Second leg ===
20 June 2021
16:00 (CEST)

Girona	0–2	Rayo Vallecano
	Report	A. García 7'; Trejo 47'

Montilivi, Girona
Referee: Javier Iglesias Villanueva

Girona	Rayo Vallecano

GK	1	(Spain) Juan Carlos
LCB	38	(Spain) Arnau Martínez		(substituted off) 60'
CB	15	(Spain) Juanpe (c)	(yellow card) 85'
RCB	22	(Uruguay) Santi Bueno
LWB	3	(Spain) Enric Franquesa		(substituted off) 77'
LCM	14	(Spain) Monchu
CM	8	(Uruguay) Sebastián Cristóforo		(substituted off) 46'
RCM	24	(Spain) Gerard Gumbau		(substituted off) 46'
RWB	16	(Brazil) Yan Couto		(substituted off) 66'
CF	18	(Senegal) Mamadou Sylla
CF	23	(Panama) Yoel Bárcenas	(yellow card) 31'
Substitutions:
GK	13	(Spain) Adrián Ortolá
DF	2	(Colombia) Bernardo Espinosa
DF	17	(Spain) Jordi Calavera
DF	21	(Spain) Antonio Luna		(substituted on) 77'
MF	10	(Spain) Samu Sáiz		(substituted on) 46'
MF	11	(Spain) Aday		(substituted on) 66'
MF	20	(Spain) Valery
MF	26	(Mali) Ibrahima Kebe
MF	27	(Spain) Ramon Terrats		(substituted on) 46'
FW	7	(Uruguay) Cristhian Stuani		(substituted on) 60'
FW	9	(Argentina) Nahuel Bustos
FW	19	(Spain) Pablo Moreno
Manager:
(Spain) Francisco

GK	1	(France) Luca Zidane
LB	33	(Spain) Fran García
CB	5	(Spain) Alejandro Catena	(yellow card) 90+6'
CB	2	(Uruguay) Emiliano Velázquez	(yellow card) 40' (red card) 56'
RB	28	(Spain) Mario Hernández		(substituted off) 77'
LCM	23	(Spain) Óscar Valentín		(substituted off) 85'
RCM	6	(Spain) Santi Comesaña
LW	18	(Spain) Álvaro García		(substituted off) 85'
AM	8	(Argentina) Óscar Trejo (c)	(yellow card) 76'	(substituted off) 77'
RW	7	(Spain) Isi Palazón
CF	11	(Spain) Andrés Martín		(substituted off) 58'
Substitutions:
GK	30	(Spain) Miguel Morro
DF	3	(Spain) Iván Martos		(substituted on) 85'
DF	17	(Peru) Luis Advíncula		(substituted on) 77'
DF	24	(Montenegro) Esteban Saveljich		(substituted on) 58'
MF	4	(Spain) Mario Suárez		(substituted on) 85'
MF	10	(Portugal) Bebé
MF	20	(Spain) Joni Montiel
MF	22	(Spain) José Pozo
FW	9	(Argentina) Leo Ulloa
FW	14	(Morocco) Yacine Qasmi		(substituted on) 77'
FW	15	(Spain) Antoñín
FW	19	(Spain) Miguel Ángel Guerrero
Manager:
(Spain) Andoni Iraola
