= 2020–21 Rayo Vallecano season =

Rayo Vallecano
2020–21 season
- President: Raúl Martín Presa
- Head coach: Andoni Iraola
- Stadium: Campo de Fútbol de Vallecas
- Segunda División: 6th (promoted via play-offs)
- Play-offs: Winners
- Copa del Rey: Round of 16
- Top goalscorer: League: Isi Palazón (9); All: Isi Palazón (10)
| Home colours | Away colours |

The 2020–21 Rayo Vallecano season was the club's 96th season in existence and the second consecutive season in the second division of Spanish football. In addition to the domestic league, Rayo Vallecano participated in this season's edition of the Copa del Rey. The season covered the period from 21 July 2020 to 30 June 2021.

== Players ==
=== First-team squad ===
Note: Flags indicate national team as defined under FIFA eligibility rules; some limited exceptions apply. Players may hold more than one non-FIFA nationality.

| No. | Pos. | Nation | Player |
|---|---|---|---|
| 1 | GK | FRA | Luca Zidane |
| 2 | DF | URU | Emiliano Velázquez |
| 3 | DF | ESP | Iván Martos (on loan from Almería) |
| 4 | MF | ESP | Mario Suárez (3rd captain) |
| 5 | DF | ESP | Alejandro Catena |
| 6 | MF | ESP | Santi Comesaña (vice-captain) |
| 7 | FW | ESP | Isi Palazón |
| 8 | FW | ARG | Óscar Trejo (captain) |
| 9 | FW | ARG | Leonardo Ulloa |
| 10 | MF | POR | Bebé |
| 11 | FW | ESP | Andrés Martín |
| 13 | GK | MKD | Stole Dimitrievski |
| 14 | FW | MAR | Yacine Qasmi |
| 15 | FW | ESP | Antoñín (on loan from Granada) |

| No. | Pos. | Nation | Player |
|---|---|---|---|
| 17 | DF | PER | Luis Advíncula |
| 18 | MF | ESP | Álvaro García |
| 19 | FW | ESP | Miguel Guerrero |
| 20 | MF | ESP | Joni Montiel |
| 22 | MF | ESP | José Ángel Pozo |
| 23 | MF | ESP | Óscar Valentín |
| 24 | DF | MNE | Esteban Saveljich |
| 27 | DF | ESP | Martín Pascual |
| 28 | DF | ESP | Mario Hernández |
| 30 | GK | ESP | Miguel Morro |
| 32 | MF | ESP | Sergio Arratia |
| 33 | DF | ESP | Fran García (on loan from Real Madrid) |
| 36 | MF | ESP | Dani Moreno |
| — | GK | ESP | Alberto García |

=== Reserve team ===
Note: Flags indicate national team as defined under FIFA eligibility rules; some limited exceptions apply. Players may hold more than one non-FIFA nationality.

| No. | Pos. | Nation | Player |
|---|---|---|---|
| 31 | FW | ESP | Marc Echarri |
| 38 | DF | ESP | Iker Recio |

| No. | Pos. | Nation | Player |
|---|---|---|---|
| 39 | MF | ESP | Manu Navarro |
| 40 | GK | ESP | Roberto González |

=== Out on loan ===
Note: Flags indicate national team as defined under FIFA eligibility rules; some limited exceptions apply. Players may hold more than one non-FIFA nationality.

| No. | Pos. | Nation | Player |
|---|---|---|---|
| — | FW | ESP | Sergio Moreno (on loan to Mirandés until 30 June 2021) |
| — | FW | GUI | Lass Bangoura (on loan to Emelec until 30 June 2021) |
| — | DF | ESP | Jordi Amat (at Eupen until 30 June 2020) |
| — | DF | ESP | Mario Hernández (at SS Reyes until 30 June 2020) |
| — | DF | SEN | Abdoulaye Ba (at Deportivo de La Coruña until 30 June 2020) |

| No. | Pos. | Nation | Player |
|---|---|---|---|
| — | FW | ESP | Adrián Carrasco (at Ebro until 30 June 2020) |
| — | FW | ESP | Sergio Benito (at Cultural Leonesa until 30 June 2020) |

== Pre-season and friendlies ==
Win Draw Loss

| 28 August 2020 Friendly | Rayo Vallecano | 0–1 | Eibar | Madrid, Spain |
| 10:00 CEST (UTC+2) | | Report | Mendia 70' | Stadium: Ciudad Deportiva; Attendance: 0 |

| 2 September 2020 Friendly | Leganés | 0–1 | Rayo Vallecano | Leganés, Spain |
| 19:00 CEST (UTC+2) | | Report | Montiel 90+2' | Stadium: Estadio Municipal de Butarque; Attendance: 0 Referee: Pedro Muñoz Piedra |

| 5 September 2020 Friendly | Rayo Vallecano | 1–0 | Fuenlabrada | Madrid, Spain |
| 10:00 CEST (UTC+2) | Qasmi 10' | Report | | Stadium: Ciudad Deportiva; Attendance: 0 |

| 9 September 2020 Friendly | Real Madrid | Cancelled | Rayo Vallecano | Madrid, Spain |
| 21:00 CEST (UTC+2) | | | | Stadium: Alfredo Di Stéfano Stadium |
Note: The match was cancelled due to a not-conclusive COVID-19 test from a Rayo Vallecano player.

== Competitions ==
=== Overview ===
| Competition | First match | Last match | Starting round | Final position | Record | | | | | | | |
| Competition | First match | Last match | Starting round | Final position | Pld | W | D | L | GF | GA | GD | Win % |
|---|---|---|---|---|---|---|---|---|---|---|---|---|
| Segunda División | 13 September 2020 | 30 May 2021 | Matchday 1 | 6th | 42 | 19 | 10 | 13 | 52 | 40 | +12 | 45.24 |
| Segunda División promotion play-offs | 3 June 2021 | 20 June 2021 | Semi-finals | Winners | 4 | 3 | 0 | 1 | 8 | 3 | +5 | 75.00 |
| Copa del Rey | 17 December 2020 | 27 January 2021 | First round | Round of 16 | 4 | 3 | 0 | 1 | 9 | 5 | +4 | 75.00 |
| Total | | | | | 50 | 25 | 10 | 15 | 69 | 48 | +21 | 50.00 |

Source: Soccerway

=== Segunda División ===
==== League table ====
| Pos | Team | Pld | W | D | L | GF | GA | GD | Pts | Promotion, qualification or relegation |
|---|---|---|---|---|---|---|---|---|---|---|
| 4 | Almería | 42 | 21 | 10 | 11 | 61 | 40 | +21 | 73 (Note: Head-to-head points: Leganés: 4, Almería: 1) | Qualification for promotion play-offs |
| 5 | Girona | 42 | 20 | 11 | 11 | 47 | 36 | +11 | 71 | Qualification for promotion play-offs |
| 6 | Rayo Vallecano (O, P) | 42 | 19 | 10 | 13 | 52 | 40 | +12 | 67 | Qualification for promotion play-offs |
| 7 | Sporting Gijón | 42 | 17 | 14 | 11 | 37 | 28 | +9 | 65 | |
| 8 | Ponferradina | 42 | 15 | 12 | 15 | 45 | 50 | −5 | 57 | |

Source: LaLiga
Rules for classification: 1) points; 2) head-to-head points; 3) head-to-head goal difference; 4) goal difference; 5) number of goals scored
(O) Play-off winners; (P) Promoted

==== Results summary ====
| Overall | | | | | | | | Home | | | | | | Away | | | | | |
| Pld | W | D | L | GF | GA | GD | Pts | W | D | L | GF | GA | GD | W | D | L | GF | GA | GD |
|---|---|---|---|---|---|---|---|---|---|---|---|---|---|---|---|---|---|---|---|
| 42 | 19 | 10 | 13 | 52 | 40 | +12 | 67 | 11 | 4 | 6 | 31 | 20 | +11 | 8 | 6 | 7 | 21 | 20 | +1 |

Source: La Liga

==== Results by round ====
| Round | 1 | 2 | 3 | 4 | 5 | 6 | 7 | 8 | 9 | 10 | 11 | 12 | 13 | 14 | 15 | 16 | 17 | 18 | 19 | 20 | 21 | 22 | 23 | 24 | 25 | 26 | 27 | 28 | 29 | 30 | 31 | 32 | 33 | 34 | 35 | 36 | 37 | 38 | 39 | 40 | 41 | 42 |
|---|---|---|---|---|---|---|---|---|---|---|---|---|---|---|---|---|---|---|---|---|---|---|---|---|---|---|---|---|---|---|---|---|---|---|---|---|---|---|---|---|---|---|
| Ground | A | H | A | H | A | H | A | A | H | A | H | A | H | A | H | A | H | A | H | H | A | H | A | H | A | A | H | A | H | A | H | H | A | H | A | H | A | H | A | H | A | H |
| Result | W | W | L | W | L | W | D | L | W | L | L | D | W | W | D | L | W | D | W | W | W | L | W | L | D | L | D | D | W | W | L | L | W | W | D | D | L | D | W | W | W | L |
| Position | 6 | 1 | 7 | 5 | 6 | 4 | 3 | 6 | 4 | 5 | 8 | 9 | 6 | 6 | 6 | 8 | 6 | 6 | 6 | 4 | 4 | 4 | 4 | 5 | 6 | 6 | 6 | 6 | 6 | 6 | 6 | 6 | 6 | 6 | 6 | 6 | 7 | 7 | 7 | 7 | 6 | 6 |

Source: La Liga
A = Away; H = Home; W = Win; D = Draw; L = Loss

==== Matches ====
The league fixtures were announced on 31 August 2020.

| 13 September 2020 1 | Mallorca | 0–1 | Rayo Vallecano | Palma |
| 16:00 CEST (UTC+2) | Valjent (yellow card) 11' | Report | Catena (yellow card) 9'; Santi (yellow card) 44'; Saveljich (yellow card) 45+3'; Isi 50'; Á. García (yellow card) 90+4' | Stadium: Visit Mallorca Stadium; Attendance: 0 (Note: The match was played behind closed doors due to the COVID-19 pandemic in Spain.); Referee: Luis Mario Milla Alvendiz |

| 19 September 2020 2 | Rayo Vallecano | 2–1 | Sabadell | Madrid |
| 21:00 CEST (UTC+2) | | Report | | Stadium: Vallecas; Attendance: 0 Referee: Daniel Jesús Trujillo Suárez |

| 27 September 2020 3 | Ponferradina | 3–0 | Rayo Vallecano | Ponferrada |
| 18:15 CEST (UTC+2) | | Report | | Stadium: El Toralín; Attendance: 0 Referee: Eduardo Prieto Iglesias |

| 3 October 2020 4 | Rayo Vallecano | 4–0 | Málaga | Madrid |
| 21:00 CEST (UTC+2) | | Report | | Stadium: Vallecas; Attendance: 0 Referee: Dámaso Arcediano Monescillo |

| 10 October 2020 5 | Tenerife | 1–0 | Rayo Vallecano | Santa Cruz de Tenerife |
| 21:00 CEST (UTC+2) | | Report | | Stadium: Heliodoro Rodríguez López; Attendance: 0 Referee: Javier Iglesias Villanueva |

| 18 October 2020 6 | Rayo Vallecano | 1–0 | Espanyol | Madrid |
| 16:00 CEST (UTC+2) | Á. García (yellow card) 34'; Catena (yellow card) 48'; Valentín (yellow card) 81'; Saveljich (yellow card) 82'; Palazón 88', (yellow card) 89'; Montiel (yellow card) 90+4' | Report | Calero (yellow card) 6'; Gil (yellow card) 78'; Cabrera (yellow card) 82'; Embarba (yellow card) 90+2' | Stadium: Campo de Fútbol de Vallecas; Attendance: 0 Referee: José Antonio López Toca |

| 22 October 2020 7 | Oviedo | 0–0 | Rayo Vallecano | Oviedo |
| 19:00 CEST (UTC+2) | | Report | | Stadium: Carlos Tartiere; Attendance: 0 Referee: Alejandro Muñiz Ruiz |

| 25 October 2020 8 | Albacete | 2–1 | Rayo Vallecano | Albacete |
| 20:30 CET (UTC+1) | | Report | | Stadium: Carlos Belmonte; Attendance: 0 Referee: Daniel Jesús Trujillo Suárez |

| 29 October 2020 9 | Rayo Vallecano | 2–0 | Fuenlabrada | Madrid |
| 21:30 CET (UTC+1) | | Report | | Stadium: Vallecas; Attendance: 0 Referee: Juan Luis Pulido Santana |

| 1 November 2020 10 | Lugo | 1–0 | Rayo Vallecano | Lugo |
| 20:30 CET (UTC+1) | | Report | | Stadium: Anxo Carro; Attendance: 0 Referee: Óliver de la Fuente Ramos |

| 8 November 2020 11 | Rayo Vallecano | 0–1 | Almería | Madrid |
| 16:00 CET (UTC+1) | | Report | | Stadium: Vallecas; Attendance: 0 Referee: Javier Iglesias Villanueva |

| 16 November 2020 12 | Sporting Gijón | 1–1 | Rayo Vallecano | Gijón |
| 21:00 CET (UTC+1) | Carmona (red card) 67'; F. García 77' (o.g.); Fuego (yellow card) 90+6' | Report | Hernández (yellow card) 54'; Velázquez (yellow card) 56'; Martín 87'; Qasmi (yellow card) 90+3' | Stadium: El Molinón; Attendance: 0 Referee: Saúl Ais Reig |

| 21 November 2020 13 | Rayo Vallecano | 2–1 | Castellón | Madrid |
| 18:15 CET (UTC+1) | | Report | | Stadium: Vallecas; Attendance: 0 Referee: Francisco José Hernández Maeso |

| 25 November 2020 14 | Zaragoza | 1–2 | Rayo Vallecano | Zaragoza |
| 19:00 CET (UTC+1) | Igbekeme 19'; Vučkić (yellow card) 55'; Nieto (yellow card) 78' | Report | Antoñín 72'; Pozo 83'; Advíncula (yellow card) 85'; Velázquez (yellow card) 88'; Valentín (yellow card) 90+2' | Stadium: La Romareda; Attendance: 0 Referee: Iosu Galech Apezteguía |

| 28 November 2020 15 | Rayo Vallecano | 0–0 | Cartagena | Madrid |
| 18:15 CET (UTC+1) | | Report | | Stadium: Vallecas; Attendance: 0 Referee: Daniel Ocón Arráiz |

| 2 December 2020 16 | Leganés | 1–0 | Rayo Vallecano | Leganés |
| 19:00 CET (UTC+1) | Arnaiz 4'; Ibáñez (yellow card) 30'; Pérez (red card) 81' | Report | Pascual (yellow card) 51'; Dimitrievski (yellow card) 63', (red card) 63'; Á. García (yellow card) 84' | Stadium: Estadio Municipal de Butarque; Attendance: 0 Referee: Eduardo Prieto Iglesias |

| 5 December 2020 17 | Rayo Vallecano | 2–1 | UD Logroñés | Madrid |
| 14:00 CET (UTC+1) | | Report | | Stadium: Vallecas; Attendance: 0 Referee: Iñaki Vicandi Garrido |

| 14 December 2020 18 | Girona | 0–0 | Rayo Vallecano | Girona |
| 19:00 CET (UTC+1) | | Report | | Stadium: Montilivi; Attendance: 0 Referee: Alejandro Muñiz Ruiz |

| 20 December 2020 19 | Rayo Vallecano | 2–0 | Las Palmas | Madrid |
| 18:15 CET (UTC+1) | | Report | | Stadium: Vallecas; Attendance: 0 Referee: Óliver de la Fuente Ramos |

| 2 January 2021 20 | Rayo Vallecano | 2–1 | Alcorcón | Madrid |
| 16:00 CET (UTC+1) | | Report | | Stadium: Vallecas; Attendance: 0 Referee: Francisco José Hernández Maeso |

| 19 January 2021 21 | Mirandés | 0–2 | Rayo Vallecano | Miranda de Ebro |
| 19:00 CET (UTC+1) | | Report | | Stadium: Anduva; Attendance: 0 Referee: José Antonio López Toca |

| 23 January 2021 22 | Rayo Vallecano | 1–3 | Mallorca | Madrid |
| 16:00 CET (UTC+2) | Advíncula (yellow card) 18', (goal) 41'; Isi (yellow card) 28'; Suárez (yellow card) 38' | Report | Ndiaye 3'; Prats 13'; Sevilla 19'; Russo (yellow card) 42'; De Galarreta (yellow card) 71'; Rodríguez (yellow card) 78' | Stadium: Vallecas; Attendance: 0 Referee: Eduardo Prieto Iglesias |

| 31 January 2021 23 | Espanyol | 2–3 | Rayo Vallecano | Cornellà de Llobregat |
| 16:00 CET (UTC+1) | Puado 8'; De Tomás 39'; Bare (yellow card) 66'; Darder (yellow card) 76'; Embarba (yellow card) 78'; Pedrosa (yellow card) 79' | Report | Isi 48', (yellow card) 49'; Valentín (yellow card) 66'; Trejo (yellow card) 68'; Montiel 79'; Qasmi (yellow card) 80'; García 83' | Stadium: RCDE Stadium; Attendance: 0 Referee: Jon Ander González Esteban |

| 7 February 2021 24 | Rayo Vallecano | 0–1 | Tenerife | Madrid |
| 18:15 CET (UTC+1) | | Report | | Stadium: Vallecas; Attendance: 0 Referee: Iosu Galech Apezteguía |

| 13 February 2021 25 | Cartagena | 2–2 | Rayo Vallecano | Cartagena |
| 16:00 CET (UTC+1) | | Report | | Stadium: Estadio Cartagonova; Attendance: 0 Referee: Aitor Gorostegui Fernández-Ortega |

| 21 February 2021 26 | Málaga | 2–0 | Rayo Vallecano | Málaga |
| 21:00 CET (UTC+1) | | Report | | Stadium: La Rosaleda; Attendance: 0 Referee: Gorka Sagués Oscoz |

| 27 February 2021 27 | Rayo Vallecano | 1–1 | Ponferradina | Madrid |
| 16:00 CET (UTC+1) | | Report | | Stadium: Vallecas; Attendance: 0 Referee: Alejandro Muñiz Ruiz |

| 6 March 2021 28 | Las Palmas | 1–1 | Rayo Vallecano | Las Palmas |
| 18:15 CET (UTC+1) | | Report | | Stadium: Gran Canaria; Attendance: 0 Referee: Eduardo Prieto Iglesias |

| 12 March 2021 29 | Rayo Vallecano | 3–2 | Zaragoza | Madrid |
| 21:00 CET (UTC+1) | Catena (yellow card) 37', (goal) 49'; Bebé 41'; Trejo (yellow card) 56'; F. García (yellow card) 61'; Á. García 70'; Hernández (yellow card) 87' | Report | Narváez 11', (yellow card) 82'; Á. García 29' (o.g.); Nieto (yellow card) 64'; Francés (yellow card) 90' | Stadium: Vallecas; Attendance: 0 Referee: Luis Mario Milla Alvendiz |

| 21 March 2021 30 | Alcorcón | 0–3 | Rayo Vallecano | Alcorcón |
| 20:30 CET (UTC+1) | Escobar (yellow card) 43' | Report | Suárez 13'; Qasmi 40'; Á. García (yellow card) 70'; Saveljich (yellow card) 75'; Valentín (yellow card) 81'; Isi 90+5'; Trejo (yellow card) 90+6' | Stadium: Santo Domingo; Attendance: 0 Referee: Dámaso Arcediano Monescillo |

| 30 March 2021 32 | Rayo Vallecano | 0–1 | Sporting Gijón | Madrid |
| 21:30 CEST (UTC+2) | Trejo (yellow card) 23'; Catena (yellow card) 68' | Report | Díaz 15' | Stadium: Vallecas; Attendance: 0 Referee: Daniel Jesús Trujillo Suárez |

| 2 April 2021 33 | Almería | 0–1 | Rayo Vallecano | Almería |
| 21:00 CEST (UTC+2) | Robertone (yellow card) 31'; Morlanes (yellow card) 33'; Fernandes (yellow card) 54' (yellow-red card) 70'; Corpas (yellow card) 56'; Balliu (yellow card) 59' | Report | Catena (yellow card) 26'; Antoñín (yellow card) 44'; Valentín (yellow card) 49'; Á. García (yellow card) 86'; Bebé 89' | Stadium: Estadio de los Juegos Mediterráneos; Attendance: 0 Referee: Alejandro Muñiz Ruiz |

| 10 April 2021 34 | Rayo Vallecano | 2–1 | Girona | Madrid |
| 18:15 CEST (UTC+2) | Comesaña (yellow card) 16', (goal) 38'; Trejo (yellow card) 24'; Saveljich (yellow card) 35'; Isi 75'; Advíncula (yellow card) 78' | Report | Bueno 36'; Couto (yellow card) 48'; Stuani (yellow card) 54' | Stadium: Vallecas; Attendance: 0 Referee: Juan Luis Pulido Santana |

| 14 April 2021 31 | Rayo Vallecano | 0–1 | Mirandés | Madrid |
| 19:00 CEST (UTC+2) | Á. García (yellow card) 56'; Valentín (yellow card) 90'; Hernández (yellow card) 90+3' | Report | González 72' | Stadium: Vallecas; Attendance: 0 Referee: Rafael Sánchez López |

| 18 April 2021 35 | UD Logroñés | 0–0 | Rayo Vallecano | Logroño |
| 14:00 CEST (UTC+2) | Olaetxea (yellow card) 47'; Paulino (yellow card) 62'; Pérez (yellow card) 71' | Report | Bebé (yellow card) 20'; Comesaña (yellow card) 41' | Stadium: Las Gaunas; Attendance: 0 Referee: Dámaso Arcediano Monescillo |

| 26 April 2021 36 | Rayo Vallecano | 2–2 | Albacete | Madrid |
| 19:00 CEST (UTC+2) | Saveljich 2'; Suárez (yellow card) 32' (yellow-red card) 61'; Trejo (yellow card) 36'; Isi (yellow card) 67'; Montiel (yellow card) 84'; Bebé (yellow card) 85', (goal) 87'; Qasmi (yellow card) 90+7' | Report | Jiménez 62' (pen.); Fuster 73'; Torres (yellow card) 84' | Stadium: Vallecas; Attendance: 0 Referee: Daniel Ocón Arráiz |

| 3 May 2021 37 | Sabadell | 2–0 | Rayo Vallecano | Sabadell |
| 18:00 CEST (UTC+2) | Stoichkov (yellow card) 37'; Grego (yellow card) 43'; Cuevas 53', (yellow card) 90'; Ozkoidi (red card) 58'; Mackay (yellow card) 70'; Hernández 90+5' | Report | Catena (yellow card) 83'; Trejo (yellow card) 89' | Stadium: Estadi de la Nova Creu Alta; Attendance: 0 Referee: Óliver de la Fuente Ramos |

| 10 May 2021 38 | Rayo Vallecano | 1–1 | Leganés | Madrid |
| 19:00 CEST (UTC+2) | Catena (yellow card) 26'; Valentín (yellow card) 53'; Trejo 58' (pen.), (yellow card) 80' | Report | Miguel 13'; Palencia (yellow card) 28'; Eraso (yellow card) 45+2'; Avilés (yellow card) 73' | Stadium: Vallecas; Attendance: 0 Referee: Daniel Jesús Trujillo Suárez |

| 16 May 2021 39 | Fuenlabrada | 1–2 | Rayo Vallecano | Fuenlabrada |
| 16:00 CEST (UTC+2) | Ciss (yellow card) 14' (yellow-red card) 45+7'; Iribas (yellow card) 18'; Nteka (red card) 23'; Kanté 55'; Diéguez (yellow card) 73'; Salvador (yellow card) 90+5'; Juanma (yellow card) 90+6' | Report | Isi 19' (pen.); Comesaña (yellow card) 35'; Trejo 45+5' (pen.); Qasmi (yellow card) 59' | Stadium: Fernando Torres; Attendance: 0 Referee: Luis Mario Milla Alvendiz |

| 20 May 2021 40 | Rayo Vallecano | 4–1 | Oviedo | Madrid |
| 21:30 CEST (UTC+2) | Comesaña 8'; Saveljich (yellow card) 35'; Isi 38'; Qasmi 45+2' (pen.); Valentín (yellow card) 69'; Ahijado 70' (o.g.) | Report | Blanco 27'; González (yellow card) 57' | Stadium: Vallecas; Attendance: 0 Referee: Iosu Galech Apezteguía |

| 24 May 2021 41 | Castellón | 0–2 | Rayo Vallecano | Castellón de la Plana |
| 21:00 CEST (UTC+2) | Gálvez (yellow card) 39'; Indias (yellow card) 83' | Report | Comesaña (yellow card) 49'; Qasmi 49'; García 51'; Trejo (yellow card) 66' | Stadium: Nou Estadi Castàlia; Attendance: 0 Referee: Dámaso Arcediano Monescillo |

| 30 May 2021 42 | Rayo Vallecano | 0–1 | Lugo | Madrid |
| 21:00 CEST (UTC+2) | Martín (yellow card) 70' | Report | Barreiro 43' (pen.); Alende (yellow card) 90+3'; Canella (yellow card) 90+7' | Stadium: Vallecas; Attendance: 0 Referee: Juan Luis Pulido Santana |

==== Promotion play-offs ====
| 3 June 2021 SF First leg | Rayo Vallecano | 3–0 | Leganés | Madrid |
| 21:00 CEST (UTC+2) | Catena (yellow card) 37'; Trejo (yellow card) 51'; Saveljich (yellow card) 55'; Á. García 73'; Bebé 76', 90+4' | Report | Pérez (yellow card) 79'; Miguel (yellow card) 90+3' | Stadium: Vallecas; Attendance: 0 Referee: Luis Mario Milla Alvendiz |

| 6 June 2021 SF Second leg | Leganés | 1–2 (1–5 agg.) | Rayo Vallecano | Leganés |
| 21:00 CEST (UTC+2) | Ibáñez 11'; Pérez (yellow card) 24'; González (yellow card) 66'; Hernández (yellow card) 83' | Report | Saveljich (yellow card) 4'; Catena (yellow card) 14'; González 67' (o.g.); Martín 80' | Stadium: Estadio Municipal de Butarque; Attendance: 0 Referee: José Antonio López Toca |

| 13 June 2021 Final First leg | Rayo Vallecano | 1–2 | Girona | Madrid |
| 21:00 CEST (UTC+2) | Isi 6'; Trejo (yellow card) 52'; Bebé (yellow card) 90+8' | Report | Franquesa 41'; Sáiz (yellow card) 45+3'; Sylla 46'; Cristóforo (yellow card) 60'; Juan Carlos (yellow card) 69'; Martínez (yellow card) 77' | Stadium: Vallecas; Attendance: 0 Referee: Juan Luis Pulido Santana |

| 20 June 2021 Final Second leg | Girona | 0–2 (2–3 agg.) | Rayo Vallecano | Girona |
| 21:00 CEST (UTC+2) | Bárcenas (yellow card) 31'; Juanpe (yellow card) 85' | Report | Á. García 7'; Velázquez (yellow card) 40' (yellow-red card) 56'; Trejo 45+2', (yellow card) 76'; Catena (yellow card) 90+6' | Stadium: Montilivi; Attendance: 0 Referee: Javier Iglesias Villanueva |

=== Copa del Rey ===
| 17 December 2020 First round | Teruel | 2–3 (a.e.t.) | Rayo Vallecano | Teruel |
| 19:00 CET (UTC+1) | Otín 90+4'; Hualde 103' | Report | Martos 38'; Antoñín 93'; Valentín 119' | Stadium: La Pinilla; Referee: Eduardo Prieto Iglesias |

| 6 January 2021 Second round | Haro | 1–3 | Rayo Vallecano | Haro |
| 17:00 CET (UTC+1) | Jon Iru 65' | Report | Qasmi 26'; Martín 45', 72' | Stadium: El Mazo; Referee: Dámaso Arcediano Monescillo |

| 16 January 2021 Round of 32 | Rayo Vallecano | 2–0 | Elche | Las Rozas (Note: Given the impossibility of being able to play the match at the Vallecas stadium in Madrid due to the consequences of the “Filomena” storm.) |
| 22:00 CET (UTC+1) | Bebé 36'; Isi (yellow card) 75'; Catena 78' | Report | Nino (yellow card) 39'; Lucumí (yellow card) 71' | Stadium: La Ciudad del Fútbol; Referee: Isidro Díaz de Mera Escuderos |

| 27 January 2021 Round of 16 | Rayo Vallecano | 1–2 | Barcelona | Madrid |
| 21:00 CET (UTC+1) | Comesaña (yellow card) 10'; Trejo (yellow card) 55'; García 63'; Suárez (yellow card) 89' | Report | Messi 70'; Dembélé (yellow card) 73'; De Jong 80'; Braithwaite (yellow card) 90+1' | Stadium: Vallecas; Referee: Guillermo Cuadra Fernández |

== Statistics ==
=== Appearances and goals ===
Last updated on 8 March 2021.

| No. | Pos | Nat | Player | Total | | Segunda División | | Copa del Rey | | Play-offs | |
| No. | Pos | Nat | Player | Apps | Goals | Apps | Goals | Apps | Goals | Apps | Goals |
Goalkeepers
| 1 | GK | (France) FRA | Luca Zidane | 14 | 0 | 13+1 | 0 | 0 | 0 | 0 | 0 |
| 13 | GK | (North Macedonia) MKD | Stole Dimitrievski | 30 | 0 | 28 | 0 | 2 | 0 | 0 | 0 |
| 30 | GK | (Spain) ESP | Miguel Morro | 6 | 0 | 4 | 0 | 2 | 0 | 0 | 0 |
| | GK | (Spain) ESP | Alberto García | 0 | 0 | 0 | 0 | 0 | 0 | 0 | 0 |
Defenders
| 2 | DF | (Uruguay) URU | Emiliano Velázquez | 27 | 0 | 18+6 | 0 | 2+1 | 0 | 0 | 0 |
| 3 | DF | (Spain) ESP | Iván Martos | 16 | 1 | 7+6 | 0 | 3 | 1 | 0 | 0 |
| 5 | DF | (Spain) ESP | Alejandro Catena | 45 | 3 | 42 | 2 | 1+2 | 1 | 0 | 0 |
| 17 | DF | (Peru) PER | Luis Advíncula | 41 | 1 | 33+5 | 1 | 2+1 | 0 | 0 | 0 |
| 24 | DF | (Montenegro) MNE | Esteban Saveljich | 31 | 1 | 25+3 | 1 | 3 | 0 | 0 | 0 |
| 27 | DF | (Spain) ESP | Martín Pascual | 8 | 0 | 4+2 | 0 | 2 | 0 | 0 | 0 |
| 28 | DF | (Spain) ESP | Mario Hernández | 18 | 0 | 12+3 | 0 | 2+1 | 0 | 0 | 0 |
| 33 | DF | (Spain) ESP | Fran García | 42 | 2 | 40 | 1 | 1+1 | 1 | 0 | 0 |
| 38 | DF | (Spain) ESP | Iker Recio | 2 | 0 | 0 | 0 | 1+1 | 0 | 0 | 0 |
Midfielders
| 4 | MF | (Spain) ESP | Mario Suárez | 33 | 2 | 11+18 | 2 | 3+1 | 0 | 0 | 0 |
| 6 | MF | (Spain) ESP | Santi Comesaña | 42 | 3 | 27+11 | 3 | 4 | 0 | 0 | 0 |
| 10 | MF | (Portugal) POR | Bebé | 29 | 7 | 9+17 | 6 | 3 | 1 | 0 | 0 |
| 18 | MF | (Spain) ESP | Álvaro García | 44 | 3 | 41+1 | 3 | 1+1 | 0 | 0 | 0 |
| 20 | MF | (Spain) ESP | Joni Montiel | 26 | 1 | 2+21 | 1 | 3 | 0 | 0 | 0 |
| 22 | MF | (Spain) ESP | José Ángel Pozo | 35 | 3 | 21+12 | 3 | 0+2 | 0 | 0 | 0 |
| 23 | MF | (Spain) ESP | Óscar Valentín | 39 | 1 | 34+4 | 0 | 0+1 | 1 | 0 | 0 |
| 32 | MF | (Spain) ESP | Sergio Arratia | 0 | 0 | 0 | 0 | 0 | 0 | 0 | 0 |
| 36 | MF | (Spain) ESP | Dani Moreno | 0 | 0 | 0 | 0 | 0 | 0 | 0 | 0 |
| 39 | MF | (Spain) ESP | Manu Navarro | 2 | 0 | 0+1 | 0 | 0+1 | 0 | 0 | 0 |
Forwards
| 7 | FW | (Spain) ESP | Isi Palazón | 46 | 10 | 31+11 | 10 | 1+3 | 0 | 0 | 0 |
| 8 | FW | (Argentina) ARG | Óscar Trejo | 44 | 4 | 35+6 | 4 | 2+1 | 0 | 0 | 0 |
| 9 | FW | (Argentina) ARG | Leonardo Ulloa | 13 | 0 | 1+11 | 0 | 1 | 0 | 0 | 0 |
| 11 | FW | (Spain) ESP | Andrés Martín | 43 | 7 | 16+25 | 5 | 2 | 2 | 0 | 0 |
| 14 | FW | (Morocco) MAR | Yacine Qasmi | 42 | 5 | 19+20 | 4 | 3 | 1 | 0 | 0 |
| 15 | FW | (Spain) ESP | Antoñín | 31 | 7 | 16+12 | 6 | 0+3 | 1 | 0 | 0 |
| 19 | FW | (Spain) ESP | Miguel Guerrero | 15 | 1 | 6+9 | 1 | 0 | 0 | 0 | 0 |
| 31 | FW | (Spain) ESP | Marc Echarri | 1 | 0 | 0 | 0 | 0+1 | 0 | 0 | 0 |
Players who have made an appearance this season but have left the club
