= José Tabares =

Argentine footballer

Personal information
- Full name: José Carlos Tabares
- Date of birth: 28 May 1978 (age 48)
- Place of birth: San Gustavo, Argentina
- Height: 1.83 m (6 ft 0 in)
- Position: Striker

Senior career*
Years	Team	Apps	(Gls)
2000–2001	Patronato		
2001–2005	C.A.I.	66	(31)
2003–2004	→ Necaxa (loan)	19	(2)
2005–2006	Arsenal Sarandí	14	(2)
2006	→ Castellón (loan)	18	(6)
2007–2010	Castellón	86	(23)
2010	Chacarita Juniors	16	(2)
2011	Rangers Talca	8	(1)
2012–2013	Juventud Antoniana	22	(1)
2013–2014	Eldense	33	(8)
2014–2016	Borriol	29	(6)
2017	Burriana		
2017–2018	Estrella Castellón		
Total		311	(82)
- * Club domestic league appearances and goals

José Carlos Tabares (born 28 May 1978) is an Argentine former professional footballer who played as a striker.

== Club career ==
Born in San Gustavo, Entre Ríos Province, Tabares started playing professionally with Comisión de Actividades Infantiles, serving a loan at Club Necaxa of Liga MX during the 2003 Apertura and 2004 Clausura tournaments. He returned to Argentina in 2005 when he signed for Arsenal de Sarandí, making his debut in the Primera División at the age of 27.

Tabares moved to Spain in January 2006, joining Segunda División club CD Castellón and scoring 20 league goals over his first two full seasons. After four years with the team, being reunited with compatriot Leonardo Ulloa in his final two and suffering relegation in 2010 (he also spent several months on the sidelines after fracturing both his fibula and his tibia twice), he went back to his country and signed with Primera Nacional side Chacarita Juniors.

In January 2011, Tabares agreed to a contract with Primera B de Chile's Rangers de Talca, achieving promotion to Primera División. Following a spell in the Argentine lower leagues with Juventud Antoniana, he returned to the Valencian Community where he represented several amateur clubs.

Tabares settled in Castellón de la Plana after retiring at age 40.
