= Antoñín =

Spanish footballer

Personal information
- Full name: Antonio Cortés Heredia
- Date of birth: 16 April 2000 (age 26)
- Place of birth: Málaga, Spain
- Height: 1.82 m (6 ft 0 in)
- Position: Forward

Team information
- Current team: Hércules (on loan from Korona Kielce)

Youth career
- 2014–2016: 26 de Febrero
- 2016: Schalke 04
- 2016–2017: 26 de Febrero
- 2017–2018: Málaga

Senior career*
Years	Team	Apps	(Gls)
2018–2020	Málaga B	16	(1)
2018-2019	→ El Palo (loan)	15	(6)
2019–2020	Málaga	22	(4)
2020–2023	Granada	8	(1)
2020–2021	→ Rayo Vallecano (loan)	27	(6)
2021–2022	→ Málaga (loan)	30	(3)
2022–2023	→ Vitória Guimarães (loan)	3	(0)
2023	→ Anorthosis (loan)	18	(4)
2023–2024	Lugo	36	(3)
2024–2025	Gimnàstic	37	(10)
2025–	Korona Kielce	29	(3)
2026–	→ Hércules (loan)	0	(0)

International career
2020	Spain U21	2	(0)
- * Club domestic league appearances and goals as of 21:21, 29 May 2026 (UTC)

Antonio Cortés Heredia (born 16 April 2000), commonly known as Antoñín, is a Spanish professional footballer who plays as a forward for Primera Federación – Group 2 club Hércules, on loan from Korona Kielce.

== Club career ==
=== Málaga ===
Born in Málaga, Andalusia to a Romani family, Antoñín started his career at lowly locals CD 26 de Febrero before agreeing to a four-year deal with FC Schalke 04 in July 2016. However, only days later, he returned to his previous club after failing to adapt to the new country, and joined Málaga CF in February 2017.

On 28 January 2018, Antoñín was loaned to Tercera División side CD El Palo, until June. He made his senior debut just hours later, starting in a 1–0 away loss against Loja CD.

Antoñín scored his first senior goal on 11 March 2018, netting the last of a 2–0 home success over CD Huétor Tájar. On 22 April, he scored a hat-trick in a 3–1 home defeat of UD Ciudad de Torredonjimeno, and finished the season with six goals in 15 matches.

Upon returning from loan, Antoñín was assigned to Málaga's B-team in Segunda División B. He made his first-team debut with the Blanquiazules on 21 September 2019, coming on as a second-half substitute for Juanpi in a 1–0 loss at Albacete Balompié in the Segunda División championship, and scored his first professional goal on 12 October in a 2–1 home defeat to Cádiz CF.

=== Granada ===
On 24 February 2020, Antoñín signed for La Liga club Granada CF until June 2024. He made his debut on 5 March in the second leg of the Copa del Rey semi-finals, replacing Carlos Neva for the last five minutes of a 2–1 win (elimination on the away goals rule). Following the resumption of the season after the COVID-19 break, he made his top tier debut on 12 June again from the bench in a win by the same score at home to Getafe CF; on 1 July he scored for the first time to open a 2–0 win at Deportivo Alavés, a match in which he was substituted at half time due to a yellow card.

On 2 October 2020, Antoñín returned to the second division after agreeing to a one-year loan deal at Rayo Vallecano. He made his debut as a substitute the next day, and scored the last goal of a 4–0 home win over his former club Málaga.

On 19 August 2021, Antoñín returned to Málaga on a one-year loan deal. On 25 July of the following year, he moved to Portuguese Primeira Liga side Vitória S.C. also in a temporary deal, but finished the season with Cypriot side Anorthosis Famagusta FC.

On 28 August 2023, Antoñín terminated his contract with the Nazaríes.

== Career statistics ==
As of match played 23 May 2026

Appearances and goals by club, season and competition
Club	Season	League			National cup (Note: Includes Copa del Rey, Taça de Portugal, Polish Cup)		Other		Total	
Club	Season	Division	Apps	Goals	Apps	Goals	Apps	Goals	Apps	Goals
Málaga B	2018–19	Segunda División B	12	0	—		—		12	0
Málaga B	2019–20	Tercera División	4	1	—		—		4	1
Málaga B	Total		16	1	0	0	0	0	16	1
El Palo (loan)	2017–18	Tercera División	15	6	—		—		15	6
Málaga	2019–20	Segunda División	22	4	0	0	—		22	4
Granada	2019–20	La Liga	8	1	1	0	—		9	1
Rayo Vallecano (loan)	2020–21	Segunda División	27	6	3	1	1 (Note: Appearance(s) in promotion play-offs)	0	31	7
Málaga (loan)	2021–22	Segunda División	30	3	1	0	—		31	3
Vitória Guimarães (loan)	2022–23	Primeira Liga	3	0	1	0	2 (Note: Appearances in UEFA Europa Conference League)	0	6	0
Anorthosis (loan)	2022–23	Cypriot First Division	18	4	3	1	—		21	5
Lugo	2023–24	Primera Federación - Gr. I	36	3	3	0	—		39	3
Gimnàstic	2024–25	Primera Federación - Gr. I	37	10	1	0	4	0	42	10
Korona Kielce	2025–26	Ekstraklasa	29	3	2	0	—		31	3
Hércules (loan)	2026–27	Primera Federación - Gr. II	0	0	0	0	—		0	0
Career total			241	41	15	2	7	0	263	43
