= Iker Recio =

Spanish footballer (born 2001)

Personal information
- Full name: Iker Recio Ortega
- Date of birth: 17 June 2001 (age 25)
- Place of birth: Escalona, Spain
- Height: 1.84 m (6 ft 0 in)
- Position: Centre-back

Team information
- Current team: Eldense

Youth career
- 2011–2020: Atlético Madrid

Senior career*
Years	Team	Apps	(Gls)
2020–2022	Rayo Vallecano B	56	(4)
2020–2022	Rayo Vallecano	0	(0)
2022–2023	Alcorcón B	28	(1)
2022–2024	Alcorcón	0	(0)
2023–2024	→ Gimnàstic (loan)	12	(0)
2024	Antequera	11	(1)
2025–2026	Cádiz	42	(0)
2026–	Eldense	0	(0)
- * Club domestic league appearances and goals as of 9 June 2026

Iker Recio Ortega (born 17 June 2001) is a Spanish footballer who plays for CD Eldense. Mainly a centre-back, he can also play as a left-back.

== Club career ==
Born in Escalona, Toledo, Castilla–La Mancha, Recio joined Atlético Madrid's youth setup in 2011, aged ten. On 14 July 2020, after finishing his formation, he joined Rayo Vallecano and was initially assigned to the reserves in Tercera División.

Recio made his senior debut on 18 October 2020, starting in a 3–2 home win against ED Moratalaz. He made his first team debut on 17 December, coming on as a late substitute for Martín Pascual in a 3–2 away win against CD Teruel, for the season's Copa del Rey; three days later he scored his first senior goal, netting for the B's in a 1–3 home loss against CF Pozuelo de Alarcón.

Recio's professional debut occurred on 16 January 2021, as he started in a 2–0 home win against Elche CF, also for the national cup. On 28 June 2022, he left Rayo and signed for another reserve team, AD Alcorcón B in the Segunda Federación.

On 21 August 2023, Recio was loaned to Primera Federación side Gimnàstic de Tarragona for the 2023–24 season. The following 20 July, he signed a permanent deal with Antequera CF also in division three.

On 30 December 2024, Recio signed a three-and-a-half-year contract with Cádiz CF in Segunda División. He established himself as a regular starter during the 2025–26 campaign, but moved to fellow league team CD Eldense on 31 August, on a two-year deal.
