= Bebé =

Portuguese-born Cape Verdean footballer (born 1990)

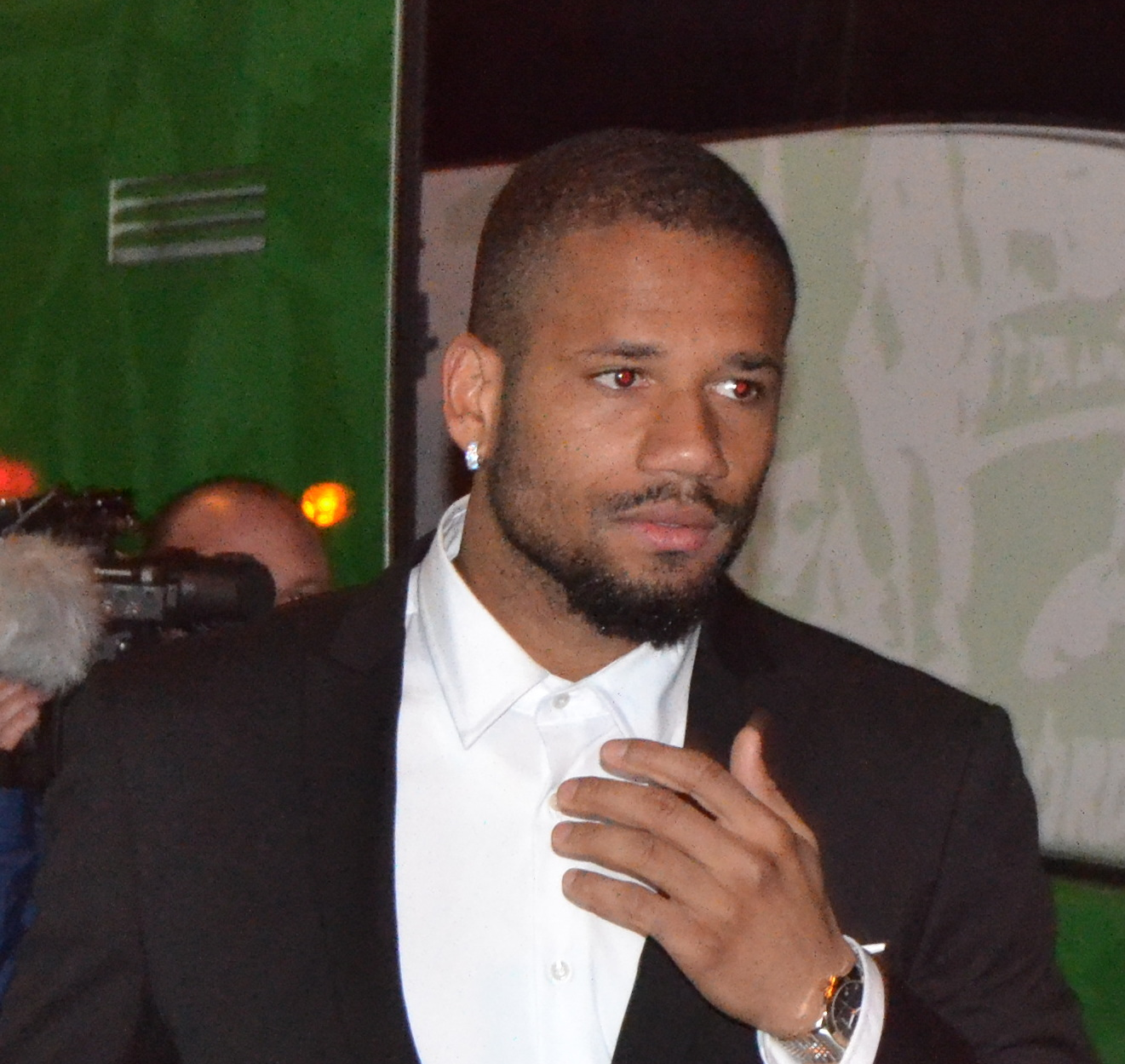
- Bebé in 2015

Personal information
- Full name: Tiago Manuel Dias Correia
- Date of birth: 12 July 1990 (age 36)
- Place of birth: Agualva-Cacém, Portugal
- Height: 1.90 m (6 ft 3 in)
- Position: Winger

Team information
- Current team: Ibiza
- Number: 7

Youth career
- 2001–2008: Loures
- 2008–2009: Estrela da Amadora

Senior career*
Years	Team	Apps	(Gls)
2009–2010	Estrela da Amadora	26	(4)
2010	Vitória de Guimarães	0	(0)
2010–2014	Manchester United	2	(0)
2011–2012	→ Beşiktaş (loan)	4	(0)
2013	→ Rio Ave (loan)	17	(1)
2013–2014	→ Paços de Ferreira (loan)	27	(12)
2014–2016	Benfica	1	(0)
2015	→ Córdoba (loan)	18	(0)
2015–2016	→ Rayo Vallecano (loan)	34	(3)
2016–2018	Eibar	31	(3)
2018	→ Rayo Vallecano (loan)	17	(3)
2018–2024	Rayo Vallecano	117	(13)
2023	→ Zaragoza (loan)	16	(4)
2024–2025	Racing Ferrol	14	(0)
2025–	Ibiza	52	(9)

International career^{‡}
2010–2011	Portugal U21	6	(1)
2022–	Cape Verde	26	(6)
- * Club domestic league appearances and goals as of 11:45, 16 May 2026 (UTC) ‡ National team caps and goals as of 23:12, 19 November 2024 (UTC)

Tiago Manuel Dias Correia (born 12 July 1990), commonly known as Bebé, is a professional footballer who plays as either a winger or attacking midfielder for Primera Federación – Group 2 club Ibiza. Born in Portugal, and a former Portuguese youth international at under-21 level, he represents the Cape Verde national team.

Abandoned by his parents at a young age, Bebé grew up in a homeless shelter near Lisbon. He began his football career as an amateur with Loures, before joining Estrela da Amadora in 2009. A year later, he was signed by Vitória de Guimarães but transferred almost immediately to Manchester United for a fee of about £7 million, despite manager Alex Ferguson admitting he had never seen Bebé play.

Unable to make an impression on the Manchester United first team, he spent time on loan with Turkish side Beşiktaş and back in Portugal with Rio Ave and Paços de Ferreira, before joining Benfica permanently in July 2014. After loan spells in Spain with Córdoba and Rayo Vallecano, he joined Eibar in July 2016. He returned to Rayo in 2018, initially on loan. He had a loan spell at Zaragoza in the 2022–23 season.

== Early life ==
Bebé is the son of Cape Verdean immigrants and is the fifth player of Cape Verdean descent to join Manchester United; the others are Portuguese international wingers Nani and Cristiano Ronaldo, French international left-back Patrice Evra and former Swedish international Henrik Larsson. He was given his nickname, which means 'baby' in Portuguese, by his older brother.

Bebé was abandoned as a young child by his father Francisco and his mother Deolinda. He was consequently raised by his grandmother in a suburb of Lisbon, until the age of 12, when a court placed him in the care of the church. He moved to the Casa do Gaiato shelter in Santo Antão do Tojal, 20 km outside Lisbon. During his time there, he and seven other residents of the shelter were invited to play for the CAIS team in the 2009 European Street Football Festival in the Bosnian town of Foča. Despite Bebé scoring four goals in six matches, CAIS did not progress beyond the second group stage of the tournament.

He was considered for selection for the national homeless squad after his performance in the European Street Football Festival, but he ultimately did not play in the tournament.

== Club career ==
=== Early career ===
Having previously played for amateur side Loures, Bebé was signed by Segunda Divisão side Estrela da Amadora in the summer of 2009. Regarded as the club's star player, he finished the season with four goals in 26 league matches. However, Estrela were beset by financial problems and offered him around Europe for £125,000 but found no takers. His former agent, Gonçalo Reis, revealed that Bebé was offered to PSV Eindhoven for free in May 2010, but PSV turned down the offer as they did not know anything about the player. As their situation worsened, they stopped paying his wages, so he broke his contract and signed for Portuguese Primeira Liga team Vitória de Guimarães in the summer of 2010, on a free transfer. His contract with Guimarães at first included a €3 million release clause, but this was increased to €9 million following his performances in pre-season games. He finished with five goals in six friendly matches.

=== Manchester United ===
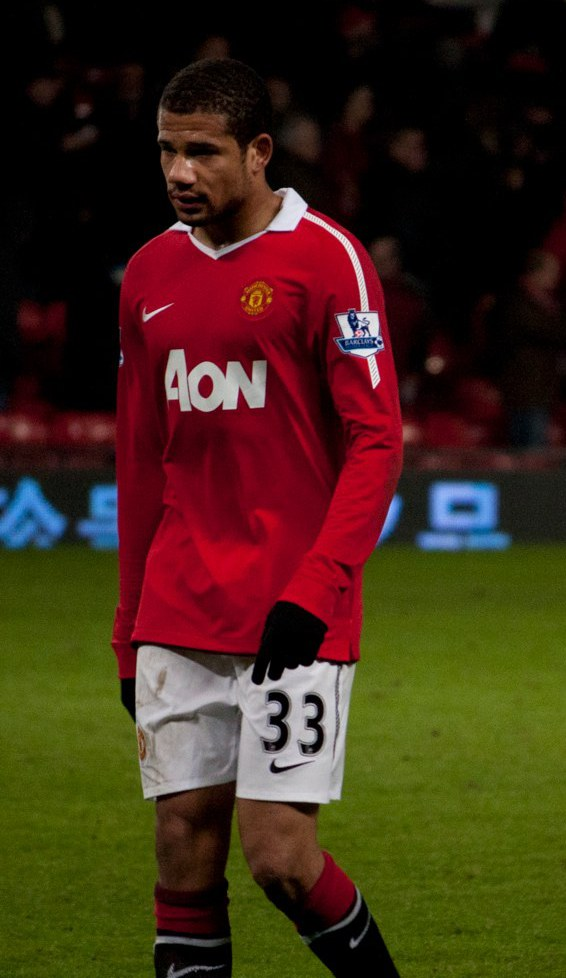
Bebé playing for Manchester United in 2011

On 11 August 2010, only five weeks after he signed for Vitória de Guimarães, Manchester United agreed an undisclosed fee with the Portuguese club for the transfer of Bebé. The fee was reported to be around £7.4 million, believed to be the value of the buy-out clause in the forward's contract, though reports in Portugal later claimed the fee was €9 million, of which the agent company GestiFute received €3.5 million and the club received €5.5 million, as third-party ownership was allowed in Portugal. It was also reported that Real Madrid and Benfica were interested in him. Ferguson only met him the day before the transfer, after being recommended to buy him by his former assistant Carlos Queiroz. On 12 August, David Gill announced that Bebé would not be sent out on loan; instead, he would work with the first-team squad to prove his worth and to learn English. The transfer was completed on 16 August, following Bebé's medical and the submission of the appropriate paperwork, and he was unveiled to the media at a press conference the following day, along with fellow new signings Javier Hernández and Chris Smalling. In 2012, it was reported that Portuguese police were investigating the transfer as part of anti-corruption procedures. Police questioned Bebé's former agent Reis and his current agent Mendes.

On 6 September, he was announced as part of the 25-man squad for Manchester United to play in the Champions League. On 22 September, Bebé made his debut for Manchester United as he replaced Park Ji-Sung in the 74th minute of a 5–2 away victory over Scunthorpe United in the League Cup third round. On 2 October, he made his Premier League debut, replacing Anderson in the 80th minute in their 0–0 draw against Sunderland. His first start came against Wolverhampton Wanderers in the fourth round of the League Cup on 26 October, scoring his first goal in the process, United's first in a 3–2 home win. His first Champions League goal came on his debut in the competition, scoring the final goal of a 3–0 away victory over Bursaspor on 2 November. On 19 February 2011, Bebé played the full 90 minutes in a 1–0 home win against non-league Crawley Town in the fifth round of the FA Cup.

==== Beşiktaş (loan) ====
On 16 June 2011, Turkish side Beşiktaş signed Bebé on a season-long loan deal, with the option of making the move permanent for £2 million. However, he suffered a cruciate ligament injury whilst on international duty with the Portugal under-21 side which would rule him out for six months. Bebé made his return from injury and made his debut for Beşiktaş in their Süper Lig match against İstanbul Belediyespor on 26 March 2012, he came off the bench and replaced Mustafa Pektemek in the 76th minute of the 2–2 draw. In April 2012, Bebé was banished from the Beşiktaş squad after breaking a team curfew and staying out until the early hours of the morning.

==== Rio Ave (loan) ====
After leaving Beşiktaş, Bebé was selected for Manchester United's pre-season tour. In his first game, he scored an injury-time volley to save a draw for Manchester United. However, he was unable to break into the team for the season ahead, and on 27 December 2012, Portuguese side Rio Ave confirmed that they signed Bebé on loan. The loan was confirmed by Manchester United on 1 January 2013.

On 9 January, Bebé made his full debut in the Taça da Liga and scored the only goal of a 1–0 win against Marítimo in the 74th minute to qualify for the knockout stage. His first league appearance for Rio Ave came against Olhanense, where he came off the substitute bench for the remaining 30 minutes of the match. His first start for the Portuguese side was against Gil Vicente, where he played 85 minutes before being substituted for Ahmed Hassan. He then played the full 90 minutes of a game against his erstwhile former side, Vitória de Guimarães, which Vitória won 3–1. Bebé got his first assist for Rio Ave against Marítimo, setting up Ahmed Hassan two minutes before half time. He then played 75 minutes in Rio Ave's 2–1 victory against Sporting CP before scoring his second goal at for the club against Académica on 55 minutes, which turned out to be the winning goal. After that he failed to find the net despite starting six of the last seven Rio Ave matches. He expressed a desire to make his stay in Portugal permanent, claiming that he did not receive support in England.

==== Paços de Ferreira (loan) ====
On 2 September 2013, Bebé returned to Portugal for another loan, this time with Paços de Ferreira until the end of the season. He made his debut on 14 September, against Benfica, scoring his first goals in the 4–3 away victory over Marítimo 10 days later. He was in impressive form in March, scoring six goals in six games. He scored two goals in the final game of the season, a 4–2 defeat against Académica, which resulted in his team being entered into a relegation play-off. In this play-off, against CD Aves, Bebé scored the first goal of his team's 3–1 win on 21 May, to finish the season with 14 goals.

=== Benfica ===
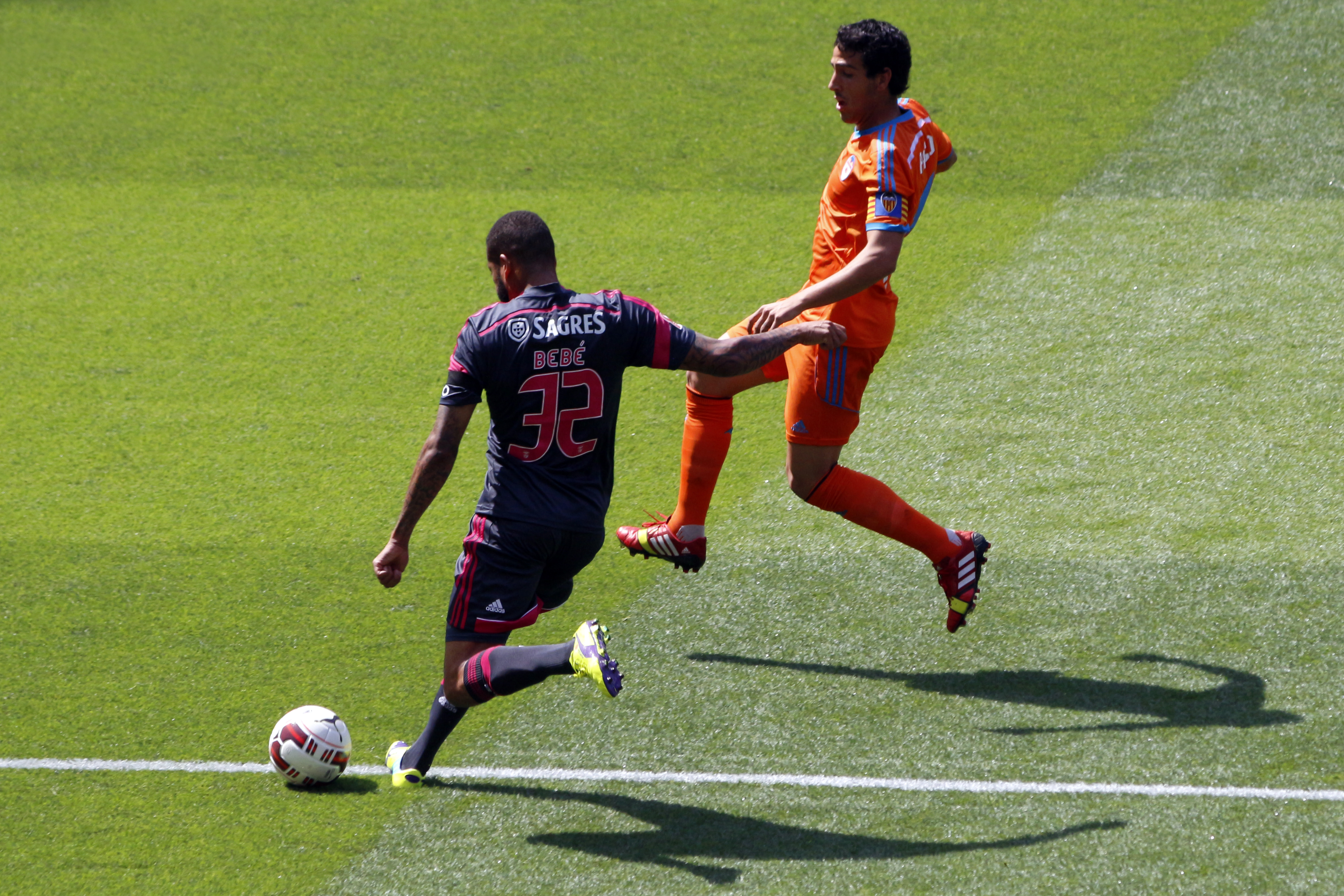
Bebé playing for Benfica in the 2014 Emirates Cup

On 25 July 2014, it was confirmed that Bebé had signed for Portuguese champions Benfica on a four-year contract, for a fee rumoured to be worth up to €3 million plus 50% of any future sell-on fee. On 10 August, he helped Benfica to win the 2014 Supercup in a penalty shoot-out. On 21 December 2014, he debuted for Benfica in Primeira Liga in a 1–0 home win against Gil Vicente, replacing Jonas for the final 25 minutes.

==== Córdoba (loan) ====
On 9 January 2015, Bebé joined Spanish club Córdoba on a loan deal until the end of the season. He debuted for the Spanish team in La Liga three days later in a 1–0 win at Rayo Vallecano, failing to score in 18 games in a season which ended with relegation.

==== Rayo Vallecano (loan) ====
On 10 July 2015, Bebé joined Rayo Vallecano on a one-year loan. He made his debut on 22 August 2015, in a goalless draw against Valencia at the Campo de Fútbol de Vallecas, and scored his first goal for the Madrid-based team on 26 September 2015, in an eventual 3–2 loss at Sevilla. They were relegated at the end of the season.

=== Eibar ===
On 12 July 2016, Bebé signed a four-year deal with Eibar, also in the Spanish top tier. He made his debut on 19 August, as the season began with a 2–1 loss at Deportivo de La Coruña, and scored his first goal on 24 September, to conclude a 2–0 home win against fellow Basques Real Sociedad. He returned to Rayo Vallecano in January 2018, on loan until the end of the season.

=== Return to Rayo Vallecano ===
On 31 August 2018, Bebé returned to Rayo on a permanent deal, after agreeing to a three-year contract. He suffered a serious knee injury during a match against Ponferradina on 26 October 2019, and was unable to play for more than a year until he returned against Fuenlabrada on 29 October 2020.

==== Zaragoza (loan) ====
On 31 January 2023, after being rarely used during the 2022–23 season, Bebé was loaned to second division side Real Zaragoza until June.

==== Return from loan ====
Upon returning, Bebé was kept in the squad under manager Francisco, being mainly used as a substitute, but lost space under new manager Iñigo Pérez. On 30 August 2024, he terminated his contract with the club.

=== Racing Ferrol ===
On 3 September 2024, Bebé agreed to a deal with Racing de Ferrol in the second division. The following 1 February, he terminated his link with the club.

=== Ibiza ===
Shortly after leaving Racing, Bebé signed a six-month contract with Primera Federación side UD Ibiza, reuniting with manager Paco Jémez.

== International career ==
In August 2010, Bebé was called up to the Portugal under-21 squad for the first time, for their 2011 European under-21 qualifiers against England and Macedonia in early September. He made his debut playing as a striker in their 1–0 loss to England on 3 September. He then scored his first goal for the under-21 side three days later in their final qualifying game against Macedonia, scoring the first in a 3–1 win. On 9 August 2011, while playing for Portugal under-21 team in a friendly match against Slovakia, Bebé suffered a cruciate ligament injury to his left knee and he was expected to be out for six months.

Without the possibility of being considered by the Portugal senior team, in January 2019, Bebé expressed his interest in being part of the Cape Verde national team and announced that he had initiated the documentary procedures for it, given his Cape Verdean ancestry. He expected to play the 2021 Africa Cup of Nations with Cape Verde but was ultimately not called up. On 16 March 2022, he received his first international call-up for the Cape Verde national team. He debuted with Cape Verde in a 2–0 friendly win over Guadeloupe, scoring his side's second goal in the 50th minute on his debut.

=== 2023 Africa Cup of Nations ===
In December 2023, Bebé was named in Cape Verde's squad for the 2023 Africa Cup of Nations in the Ivory Coast. He made his AFCON debut in the team's opening fixture – a 2–1 win over Ghana – on 14 January 2024. In the team's second match, Bebé opened the scoring with a free-kick to give Cape Verde a 1–0 lead against Mozambique. The Tubarões Azuis eventually won the match 3–0 to become the first team to qualify for the knockout stage of the competition.

== Career statistics ==
=== Club ===
As of match played 25 May 2024

Appearances and goals by club, season and competition
Club	Season	League			National cup		League cup		Europe		Other		Total	
Club	Season	Division	Apps	Goals	Apps	Goals	Apps	Goals	Apps	Goals	Apps	Goals	Apps	Goals
Estrela da Amadora	2009–10	Segunda Divisão	26	4	1	0	—		—		—		27	4
Vitória de Guimarães	2010–11	Primeira Liga	0	0	0	0	0	0	—		—		0	0
Manchester United	2010–11	Premier League	2	0	1	0	3	1	1 (Note: Appearance(s) in UEFA Champions League)	1	0	0	7	2
Manchester United	2011–12	Premier League	0	0	0	0	0	0	0	0	0	0	0	0
Manchester United	2012–13	Premier League	0	0	0	0	0	0	0	0	—		0	0
Manchester United	2013–14	Premier League	0	0	0	0	0	0	0	0	0	0	0	0
Manchester United	Total		2	0	1	0	3	1	1	1	0	0	7	2
Beşiktaş (loan)	2011–12	Süper Lig	4	0	0	0	—		0	0	—		4	0
Rio Ave (loan)	2012–13	Primeira Liga	17	1	0	0	2	1	—		—		19	2
Paços de Ferreira (loan)	2013–14	Primeira Liga	27	12	2	1	3	0	5 (Note: Appearances in UEFA Europa League)	0	2 (Note: Appearances in Primeira Liga relegation play-offs)	1	39	14
Benfica	2014–15	Primeira Liga	1	0	1	0	0	0	3	0	1 (Note: Appearance in Supertaça Cândido de Oliveira)	0	6	0
Benfica	2015–16	Primeira Liga	0	0	0	0	0	0	0	0	0	0	0	0
Benfica	Total		1	0	1	0	0	0	3	0	1	0	6	0
Córdoba (loan)	2014–15	La Liga	18	0	0	0	—		—		—		18	0
Rayo Vallecano (loan)	2015–16	La Liga	34	3	3	0	—		—		—		37	3
Eibar	2016–17	La Liga	20	3	6	2	—		—		—		26	5
Eibar	2017–18	La Liga	9	0	2	0	—		—		—		11	0
Eibar	2018–19	La Liga	2	0	0	0	—		—		—		2	0
Eibar	Total		31	3	8	2	—		—		—		39	5
Rayo Vallecano (loan)	2017–18	Segunda División	17	3	0	0	—		—		—		17	3
Rayo Vallecano	2018–19	La Liga	27	1	2	0	—		—		—		29	1
Rayo Vallecano	2019–20	Segunda División	12	3	0	0	—		—		—		12	3
Rayo Vallecano	2020–21	Segunda División	26	6	3	1	—		—		—		29	7
Rayo Vallecano	2021–22	La Liga	29	1	7	1	—		—		—		36	2
Rayo Vallecano	2022–23	La Liga	4	0	2	1	—		—		—		6	1
Rayo Vallecano	2023–24	La Liga	19	2	2	2	—		—		—		21	4
Rayo Vallecano	Total		117	13	16	5	—		—		—		133	18
Zaragoza (loan)	2022–23	Segunda División	16	4	—		—		—		—		16	4
Career total			310	43	32	8	8	2	9	1	3	1	362	55

=== International ===
As of match played 19 November 2024

Appearances and goals by national team and year
National team	Year	Apps	Goals
Cape Verde	2022	7	3
Cape Verde	2023	9	2
Cape Verde	2024	10	1
Total		26	6

Scores and results list Cape Verde's goal tally first, score column indicates score after each Bebé goal.

List of international goals scored by Bebé
No.	Date	Venue	Opponent	Score	Result	Competition
1	23 March 2022	Stade de la Source, Orléans, France	Guadeloupe	1–0	2–0	Friendly
2	25 March 2022	Pinatar Arena, San Pedro del Pinatar, Spain	Liechtenstein	5–0	6–0	Friendly
3	25 March 2022	Pinatar Arena, San Pedro del Pinatar, Spain	Liechtenstein	6–0	6–0	Friendly
4	18 June 2023	Estádio Nacional de Cabo Verde, Praia, Cape Verde	Burkina Faso	1–0	3–1	2023 Africa Cup of Nations qualification
5	12 October 2023	Mohamed Hamlaoui Stadium, Constantine, Algeria	Algeria	1–3	1–5	Friendly
6	19 January 2024	Felix Houphouet Boigny Stadium, Abidjan, Ivory Coast	Mozambique	1–0	3–0	2023 Africa Cup of Nations

== Honours ==
Benfica

- Primeira Liga: 2014–15
- Supertaça Cândido de Oliveira: 2014

Rayo Vallecano

- Segunda División: 2017–18
