= 2022–23 Anorthosis Famagusta FC season =

Anorthosis Famagusta
2022–23 season
- President: Chris Poullaidis
- Head coach: Darko Milanič (until 3 October 2022); Xisco Muñoz (until 5 January 2023); Vesko Mihajlović (until 30 June 2023)
- Stadium: Antonis Papadopoulos Stadium
- Cypriot First Division: 7th
- Cypriot Cup: Quarter-Final
- Top goalscorer: League: Miguel Ángel Guerrero (10); All: Miguel Ángel Guerrero (10)
- Biggest win: Doxa Katokopias 0–5 Anorthosis
- Biggest defeat: AEK 4–0 Anorthosis
Home colours	Away colours	Third colours

The 2022–23 Anorthosis Famagusta season is the 77th season in the top flight. In addition to the domestic league, Anorthosis will participate in this season's editions of the Cypriot Cup. The season covers the period from 1 July 2022 until 31 May 2023.

== Cypriot First Division ==
=== Regular season ===
==== League table ====
Pos	Team	Pld	W	D	L	GF	GA	GD	Pts	Qualification or relegation
7	Nea Salamis Famagusta	26	12	2	12	27	34	−7	38	Qualification for the Relegation round
8	AEL Limassol	25	10	5	10	21	20	+1	35	Qualification for the Relegation round
9	Anorthosis Famagusta	26	9	6	11	22	30	−8	33	Qualification for the Relegation round
10	Karmiotissa	26	7	6	13	25	40	−15	27	Qualification for the Relegation round
11	Enosis Neon Paralimni	26	6	3	17	22	38	−16	21	Qualification for the Relegation round

Source: Cyprus Football Association
Rules for classification: 1) Points; 2) Head-to-head points; 3) Head-to-head goal difference; 4) Head-to-head goals scored; 5) Head-to-head away goals scored (only if two teams); 6) Goal difference; 7) Goals scored; 8) Play-off (only if deciding championship round, relegation round or relegation).
