= Fran García (footballer, born 1999) =

Spanish footballer (born 1999)

Personal information
- Full name: Francisco José García Torres
- Date of birth: 14 August 1999 (age 27)
- Place of birth: Bolaños de Calatrava, Spain
- Height: 1.69 m (5 ft 7 in)
- Position: Left-back

Team information
- Current team: Betis
- Number: 11

Youth career
- 2009–2013: Bolaños
- 2013–2018: Real Madrid

Senior career*
Years	Team	Apps	(Gls)
2018–2020	Real Madrid B	57	(1)
2018–2021	Real Madrid	0	(0)
2020–2021	→ Rayo Vallecano (loan)	37	(1)
2021–2023	Rayo Vallecano	72	(3)
2023–2026	Real Madrid	69	(2)
2026–	Betis	11	(0)

International career^{‡}
2014–2015	Spain U16	8	(1)
2016	Spain U17	8	(2)
2017	Spain U18	2	(1)
2017–2018	Spain U19	4	(0)
2019	Spain U20	6	(0)
2020	Spain U21	1	(0)
2023–	Spain	3	(0)
Medal record
Men's football
Representing Spain
UEFA Nations League
Winner	2023 Netherlands
UEFA European Under-17 Championship
Runner-up	2016 Azerbaijan
- * Club domestic league appearances and goals as of 18:57, 21 November 2026 (UTC) ‡ National team caps and goals as of 20:43, 3 October 2026 (UTC)

Francisco José García Torres (born 14 August 1999) is a Spanish professional footballer who plays as a left-back for La Liga club Real Betis and the Spain national team.

== Club career ==
=== Real Madrid ===
Born in Bolaños de Calatrava, Ciudad Real, Castilla–La Mancha, García joined Real Madrid's La Fábrica in 2013, from hometown side Bolaños CF. On 1 February 2018, while still a junior, he renewed his contract until 2022.

Promoted to the reserves ahead of the 2018–19 season, García made his senior debut on 9 September by playing the last 25 minutes of a 0–0 Segunda División B away draw against AD Unión Adarve. He made his first team debut on 6 December, coming on as a second-half substitute for Dani Carvajal in a 6–1 home routing of UD Melilla, for the season's Copa del Rey.

García scored his first senior goal on 15 December 2019, netting his team's second in a 3–0 home win against Getafe CF B.

=== Rayo Vallecano ===
On 1 September 2020, García was loaned to Segunda División club Rayo Vallecano for the 2020–21 campaign. He made his professional debut thirteen days later, starting in a 1–0 away win against Mallorca. He immediately became a starter for Andoni Iraola's side, but suffered a knee injury in November; initially expected to miss the remainder of the campaign, he returned to play after 20 days.

On 13 July 2021, after helping in Rayo's promotion to La Liga, García joined the club permanently on a four-year contract. He made his debut in the category on 15 August, starting in a 3–0 away loss to Sevilla. In the 2022–23 season, his notable performance has attracted the attention of many clubs, including his childhood club, Real Madrid.

=== Return to Real Madrid ===
On 9 June 2023, Real Madrid announced the re-signing of García until June 2027, after triggering the buy-back clause for a fee of €5m. On 12 August 2023, he made his first appearance after the return, playing the full 90 minutes in a 2–0 away win over Athletic Bilbao in the league. On 17 September, García delivered two assists in a La Liga fixture against Real Sociedad, contributing to a 2–1 triumph for Real Madrid. For his standout performance, he was named the man of the match. On 20 September, García made his UEFA Champions League debut in a group stage match, coming on as a substitute for Nacho against Union Berlin. On 11 May 2024, he scored his first league goal at the club in a 4–0 away win over Granada. On 5 July 2025, García scored the second goal for Real Madrid in a 3–2 victory over Borussia Dortmund in the FIFA Club World Cup quarter-finals, securing their advancement to the semi-finals.

=== Real Betis ===
On 8 July 2026, García was transferred to fellow La Liga club Real Betis, signing a four-year contract.

== International career ==
On 12 June 2023, García was called up to the senior Spanish national team squad for the first time for the 2023 UEFA Nations League Finals, replacing Juan Bernat. He remained as an unused substitute during the two matches against Italy and Croatia.

On 12 October 2023, García made his international debut for Spain during a UEFA Euro 2024 qualifying match against Scotland, which Spain won 2–0.

== Career statistics ==
=== Club ===
As of match played 21 November 2026

Appearances and goals by club, season and competition
Club	Season	League			Copa del Rey		Europe		Other		Total	
Club	Season	Division	Apps	Goals	Apps	Goals	Apps	Goals	Apps	Goals	Apps	Goals
Real Madrid Castilla	2018–19	Segunda División B	30	0	—		—		2 (Note: Appearances in La Liga play-offs)	0	32	0
Real Madrid Castilla	2019–20	Segunda División B	27	1	—		—		—		27	1
Real Madrid Castilla	Total		57	1	—		—		2	0	59	1
Real Madrid	2018–19	La Liga	0	0	1	0	0	0	—		1	0
Rayo Vallecano (loan)	2020–21	Segunda División	37	1	2	1	—		4	0	43	2
Rayo Vallecano	2021–22	La Liga	34	1	5	0	—		—		39	1
Rayo Vallecano	2022–23	La Liga	38	2	2	0	—		—		40	2
Rayo Vallecano	Rayo Vallecano total		109	4	9	1	—		4	0	122	5
Real Madrid	2023–24	La Liga	25	1	2	0	4 (Note: Appearances in UEFA Champions League)	0	0	0	31	1
Real Madrid	2024–25	La Liga	31	0	6	0	9	0	8 (Note: One appearance in Supercopa de España, one appearance in FIFA Intercontinental Cup, six appearances and one goal in FIFA Club World Cup)	1	54	1
Real Madrid	2025–26	La Liga	13	1	2	0	7	0	1 (Note: Appearance(s) in Supercopa de España)	0	23	1
Real Madrid	Total		69	2	10	0	20	0	9	1	108	3
Real Betis	2026–27	La Liga	11	0	1	0	4	0	—		16	0
Career total			246	7	21	1	24	0	15	1	305	9

=== International ===
As of match played 3 October 2026

Appearances and goals by national team and year
National team	Year	Apps	Goals
Spain
Spain	2023	2	0
Spain	2024	0	0
Spain	2025	0	0
Spain	2026	1	0
Total		3	0

== Honours ==
Real Madrid

- La Liga: 2023–24
- Supercopa de España: 2024
- UEFA Champions League: 2023–24
- UEFA Super Cup: 2024
- FIFA Intercontinental Cup: 2024

Spain

- UEFA Nations League: 2022–23

Spain U17

- UEFA European Under-17 Championship runner-up: 2016

Individual

- Rayo Vallecano Player of the Season: 2020–21, 2022–23
