= Alejandro Catena =

Spanish footballer

Personal information
- Full name: Alejandro Catena Marugán
- Date of birth: 28 October 1994 (age 32)
- Place of birth: Móstoles, Spain
- Height: 1.94 m (6 ft 4 in)
- Position: Centre-back

Team information
- Current team: Osasuna
- Number: 24

Youth career
- 2009–2013: Móstoles

Senior career*
Years	Team	Apps	(Gls)
2013–2016	Móstoles	89	(8)
2016–2017	Navalcarnero	29	(2)
2017–2018	Marbella	31	(1)
2018–2019	Reus	21	(1)
2019–2023	Rayo Vallecano	151	(8)
2023–	Osasuna	100	(5)
- * Club domestic league appearances and goals as of 27 May 2026

Alejandro Catena Marugán (born 28 October 1994) is a Spanish professional footballer who plays as a centre-back for La Liga club Osasuna.

== Career ==
=== Early career ===
Catena was born in Móstoles, Madrid, and represented CD Móstoles URJC as a youth. He made his first-team debut during the 2012–13 season, achieving promotion to Tercera División.

On 28 July 2016, Catena signed for Segunda División B side CDA Navalcarnero. The following 28 June, he moved to fellow league team Marbella FC.

=== Reus ===
On 25 June 2018, Catena agreed to a three-year deal for CF Reus Deportiu in Segunda División. He made his professional debut on 19 August, starting in a 2–0 away loss against UD Las Palmas.

Catena scored his first professional goal on 21 October 2018, netting the equalizer in a 2–1 home defeat of CF Rayo Majadahonda. The following January, he terminated his contract with the Catalans due to the club's poor financial situation overall.

=== Rayo Vallecano ===
On 31 January 2019, free agent Catena signed a 18-month deal with La Liga side Rayo Vallecano. He made his debut in the category on 12 May, starting in a 2–1 home loss to Real Valladolid, as his club was already relegated.

On 16 January 2020, after establishing himself as a starter, Catena renewed with Rayo until 2023. He scored three goals in 46 appearances overall during the 2020–21 campaign, as the club returned to the top tier.

Catena scored his first goal in the main category of Spanish football on 18 December 2021, netting his team's second in a 2–0 home win over Deportivo Alavés.

=== Osasuna ===
On 9 June 2023, fellow first division side CA Osasuna reached an agreement with Catena for a five-year contract, at the conclusion of his Rayo deal. Prior to making a competitive appearance for his new side, he scored a hat-trick against local rivals Real Sociedad (all from headers) in the pre-season Euskal Herriko Txapela match.

== Career statistics ==
As of match played 4 June 2023

Appearances and goals by club, season and competition
Club	Season	League			National cup		Other		Total	
Club	Season	Division	Apps	Goals	Apps	Goals	Apps	Goals	Apps	Goals
Navalcarnero	2016–17	Segunda División B	29	2	0	0	—		29	2
Marbella	2017–18	Segunda División B	31	1	0	0	2 (Note: Appearance(s) in Promotion Playoffs)	0	33	1
Reus	2018–19	Segunda División	21	1	2	0	—		23	1
Rayo Vallecano	2018–19	La Liga	2	0	0	0	—		2	0
Rayo Vallecano	2019–20	Segunda División	39	3	1	1	—		40	4
Rayo Vallecano	2020–21	Segunda División	39	2	3	1	4	0	46	3
Rayo Vallecano	2021–22	La Liga	36	2	4	0	—		40	2
Rayo Vallecano	2022–23	La Liga	35	1	2	0	—		37	1
Rayo Vallecano	Total		151	8	10	2	4	0	165	10
Career total			232	12	12	2	6	0	251	14
