= Mario Hernández (footballer, born 1999) =

Spanish footballer

Personal information
- Full name: Mario Hernández Fernández
- Date of birth: 25 January 1999 (age 27)
- Place of birth: Madrid, Spain
- Height: 1.78 m (5 ft 10 in)
- Position: Right back

Youth career
- 2013–2016: Atlético Madrid
- 2016–2017: Rayo Vallecano

Senior career*
Years	Team	Apps	(Gls)
2017–2023	Rayo Vallecano B	27	(1)
2018–2019	→ Recreativo (loan)	0	(0)
2019	→ Melilla (loan)	7	(0)
2019–2020	→ SS Reyes (loan)	21	(0)
2020–2023	Rayo Vallecano	25	(1)
2023–2024	Oviedo	4	(0)
- * Club domestic league appearances and goals as of 14 December 2023

Mario Hernández Fernández (born 25 January 1999) is a Spanish professional footballer who plays as a right back.

== Club career ==
Born in Madrid, Hernández joined Rayo Vallecano's youth setup in January 2016, from Atlético Madrid. He made his senior debut with the reserves on 2 September 2017, starting in a 2–0 Tercera División home win against RSD Alcalá.

Hernández scored his first senior goal on 2 May 2018, netting a last-minute winner in a 2–1 away defeat of CD San Fernando de Henares. On 17 August, he moved on loan to Recreativo de Huelva in Segunda División B, but was unable to play as his registration did not arrive on time at the Royal Spanish Football Federation.

On 4 January 2019, Hernández left Recre and moved to fellow third division side UD Melilla, on loan for the remainder of the season. On 15 August, he joined UD San Sebastián de los Reyes in the same category, also in a temporary deal.

Upon returning, Hernández featured with the first team in the pre-season, and made his professional debut on 13 September 2020 by starting in a 1–0 away win against RCD Mallorca. He contributed with 19 appearances overall during the campaign, as the club achieved promotion to La Liga.

Hernández made his debut in the main category of Spanish football on 17 October 2021, starting and scoring the equalizer in a 2–1 home win over Elche CF. However, he featured rarely in the following two seasons, acting mainly as a backup to Iván Balliu, and confirmed his departure from Rayo on 3 July 2023, after his contract expired.

On 2 August 2023, Hernández joined Real Oviedo in the second division on a one-year deal.

== Career statistics ==
=== Club ===
As of end of 2022–23 season

Appearances and goals by club, season and competition
Club	Season	League			National Cup		Other		Total	
Club	Season	Division	Apps	Goals	Apps	Goals	Apps	Goals	Apps	Goals
Rayo Vallecano B	2017–18	Tercera División	27	1	—		—		27	1
Recreativo (loan)	2018–19	Segunda División B	0	0	0	0	—		0	0
Melilla (loan)	2018–19	Segunda División B	7	0	0	0	0 (Note: Appearance(s) in Promotion Playoffs)	0	7	0
SS Reyes (loan)	2019–20	Segunda División B	21	0	1	0	—		22	0
Rayo Vallecano	2020–21	Segunda División	13	0	3	0	3	0	19	0
Rayo Vallecano	2021–22	La Liga	9	1	3	0	—		12	1
Rayo Vallecano	2022–23	La Liga	3	0	3	0	—		6	0
Rayo Vallecano	Total		25	1	9	0	3	0	37	1
Career total			80	2	10	0	3	0	93	2
