= Esteban Saveljich =

Footballer (born 1991)

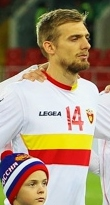
- Saveljich with Montenegro in 2015

Personal information
- Full name: Esteban Ariel Saveljich
- Date of birth: 20 May 1991 (age 35)
- Place of birth: Tandil, Argentina
- Height: 1.87 m (6 ft 2 in)
- Position: Centre-back

Youth career
- 2006–2012: Racing Club

Senior career*
Years	Team	Apps	(Gls)
2012–2016	Racing Club	28	(1)
2015–2016	→ Defensa y Justicia (loan)	24	(1)
2016	→ Almería (loan)	17	(1)
2016–2019	Levante	9	(0)
2017–2018	→ Albacete (loan)	29	(0)
2018–2019	→ Almería (loan)	33	(1)
2019–2023	Rayo Vallecano	79	(4)
2023–2024	Burgos	8	(0)
2024–2026	Real Murcia	30	(3)

International career^{‡}
2015–2016	Montenegro	4	(0)
- * Club domestic league appearances and goals as of 1 December 2025 ‡ National team caps and goals as of 24 March 2016

Esteban Ariel Saveljich (Montenegrin: Естебан Савељић, romanized: Esteban Saveljić; born 20 May 1991) is a professional footballer who plays as a centre-back. Born in Argentina, he played for the Montenegro national team.

== Club career ==
Born in Tandil, Buenos Aires Province, Argentina, Saveljich joined Racing Club's youth setup in 2006, aged 15. On 23 June 2012, he made his first team – and Primera División – debut, in a 2–1 away loss against Vélez Sársfield.

Saveljich scored his first professional goal on 1 April 2014, in a 3–3 home draw against Estudiantes. He was also a part of the squad which was crowned champions in that year, but as a backup.

In January 2015 Saveljich was loaned to fellow top-tier club Defensa y Justicia, until the end of the year. He appeared in 24 matches, scoring once, as his side avoided relegation.

On 24 January 2016, Saveljich moved abroad, signing a six-month loan deal with Segunda División side UD Almería. On 18 August, he signed a permanent four-year deal with fellow league team Levante UD.

On 4 August 2017, after contributing sporadically to the Valencian club's promotion to La Liga, Saveljich was loaned to Albacete Balompié in the second level, for one year. On 31 August 2018, he returned to Almería on loan for the 2018–19 campaign.

On 26 July 2019, Saveljich agreed to a permanent four-year deal with Rayo Vallecano, freshly relegated to the second division. On 1 September 2023, he joined Burgos CF in the second division on a one-year contract.

On 22 August 2024, Saveljich signed with Real Murcia in the third tier.

== International career ==
Saveljich obtained Montenegrin nationality in 2015. He was called up for international matches of Montenegro versus Denmark and Sweden in June 2015, both of which he entered as a substitute. In a Euro 2016 qualifying match against Russia, he was in the starting line-up. Under Ljubiša Tumbaković, the new head coach of Montenegro national team, he played in a friendly match against Greece.

== Personal life ==
Saveljich, a Montenegrin Argentine, is the cousin of former Montenegrin footballer Niša Saveljić. His paternal great-grandfather and grandmother were immigrants from Montenegro.

Saveljich is nicknamed el Polaco (The Pole) by Argentine media, due to his hair colour. Conversely, in Montenegro he is nicknamed Gaucho.

== Career statistics ==
=== Club ===
As of match played 22 August 2021

Appearances and goals by club, season and competition
Club	Season	League			National Cup		Other		Total	
Club	Season	Division	Apps	Goals	Apps	Goals	Apps	Goals	Apps	Goals
Racing Club	2011–12	Primera División	1	0	0	0	—		1	0
Racing Club	2012–13	Primera División	1	0	0	0	—		1	0
Racing Club	2013–14	Primera División	26	1	0	0	—		26	1
Racing Club	Total		28	1	0	0	0	0	28	1
Defensa y Justicia (loan)	2015	Primera División	24	1	3	0	—		27	1
Almería (loan)	2015–16	Segunda División	17	1	0	0	—		17	1
Levante	2016–17	Segunda División	9	0	1	0	—		10	0
Albacete (loan)	2017–18	Segunda División	29	0	0	0	—		29	0
Almería (loan)	2018–19	Segunda División	33	1	1	0	—		34	1
Rayo Vallecano	2019–20	Segunda División	32	3	2	0	—		34	3
Rayo Vallecano	2020–21	Segunda División	25	1	3	0	4 (Note: Appearance(s) in Promotion Playoffs)	0	32	1
Rayo Vallecano	2021–22	La Liga	9	0	0	0	—		9	0
Rayo Vallecano	Total		66	4	5	0	4	0	75	4
Career total			206	8	10	0	4	0	220	8

=== International ===
As of match played 24 March 2016

Appearances and goals by national team and year
National team	Year	Apps	Goals
Montenegro	2015	3	0
Montenegro	2016	1	0
Total		4	0

== Honours ==
Racing Club

- Argentine Primera División: 2014

Levante UD

- Segunda División: 2016–17
