= Miguel Morro =

Spanish footballer (born 2000)

Personal information
- Full name: Miguel Ángel Morro Muñoz
- Date of birth: 11 September 2000 (age 26)
- Place of birth: Alcalá de Henares, Spain
- Height: 1.95 m (6 ft 5 in)
- Position: Goalkeeper

Team information
- Current team: Rayo Vallecano

Youth career
- Naya
- Real Madrid
- Alcobendas
- Alcalá
- Rayo Vallecano

Senior career*
Years	Team	Apps	(Gls)
2019–2023	Rayo Vallecano B	14	(0)
2019–	Rayo Vallecano	7	(0)
2021–2022	→ Fuenlabrada (loan)	13	(0)
2023–2024	→ Villarreal B (loan)	9	(0)
2024–2025	→ Vizela (loan)	6	(0)
2025–2026	→ Leixões (loan)	13	(0)

International career
2018–2019	Spain U19	2	(0)
2022	Spain U21	2	(0)
- * Club domestic league appearances and goals as of 19 June 2026

Miguel Ángel Morro Muñoz (born 11 September 2000) is a Spanish professional footballer who plays as a goalkeeper for Rayo Vallecano.

== Club career ==
Born in Alcalá de Henares, Community of Madrid, Community of Madrid, Morro represented AD Naya, Real Madrid, Alcobendas CF, RSD Alcalá and Rayo Vallecano. On 31 January 2019, he renewed his contract with the latter until 2023.

Morro made his senior debut with the reserves on 3 February 2019, starting in a 1–0 Tercera División home win against CD Leganés B. On 11 October, after both first team goalkeepers were out (Alberto García injured and Stole Dimitrievski on international duty), he made his professional debut by playing the full 90 minutes in a 2–1 home defeat of CD Tenerife in the Segunda División.

On 25 August 2021, Morro was loaned to CF Fuenlabrada in the second division, for one year. Upon returning, he was a third-choice behind Stole Dimitrievski and Diego López before moving out on loan to Villarreal CF B also in division two on 25 August 2023.

On 29 August 2024, Morro moved abroad for the first time in his career, after agreeing to a one-year loan deal with Liga Portugal 2 side FC Vizela. On 14 July of the following year, he moved to fellow league team Leixões SC also in a temporary deal.

== Career statistics ==
=== Club ===
As of match played 16 March 2024

Appearances and goals by club, season and competition
Club	Season	League			National Cup		Other		Total	
Club	Season	Division	Apps	Goals	Apps	Goals	Apps	Goals	Apps	Goals
Rayo Vallecano B	2018–19	Tercera División	10	0	—		—		10	0
Rayo Vallecano B	2019–20	Tercera División	3	0	—		—		3	0
Rayo Vallecano B	2022–23	Tercera Federación	1	0	—		—		4	0
Rayo Vallecano B	Total		14	0	—		—		14	0
Rayo Vallecano	2018–19	Segunda División	0	0	0	0	—		0	0
Rayo Vallecano	2019–20	Segunda División	3	0	4	0	—		7	0
Rayo Vallecano	2020–21	Segunda División	4	0	2	0	0	0	6	0
Rayo Vallecano	2021–22	La Liga	0	0	—		—		0	0
Rayo Vallecano	2022–23	La Liga	0	0	0	0	—		0	0
Rayo Vallecano	2023–24	La Liga	0	0	—		—		0	0
Rayo Vallecano	2024–25	La Liga	0	0	0	0	—		0	0
Rayo Vallecano	Total		7	0	6	0	0	0	13	0
Fuenlabrada (loan)	2021–22	Segunda División	13	0	3	0	—		16	0
Villarreal B (loan)	2023–24	Segunda División	9	0	—		—		9	0
Career total			43	0	9	0	0	0	52	0
