= Marc Echarri =

Spanish footballer

Personal information
- Full name: Marc Echarri Marín
- Date of birth: 4 March 1999 (age 27)
- Place of birth: Manzanares el Real, Spain
- Height: 1.90 m (6 ft 3 in)
- Position: Forward

Team information
- Current team: Trival Valderas

Youth career
- 2012–2013: El Real de Manzanares
- 2015–2016: Siete Picos
- 2016–2017: RC Alcobendas
- 2017–2018: Aravaca

Senior career*
| Years | Team | Apps | (Gls) |
| 2018–2019 | Alcorcón B | 10 | (0) |
| 2019 | Trival Valderas | 11 | (2) |
| 2019–2021 | Rayo Vallecano B | 43 | (26) |
| 2020 | Rayo Vallecano | 1 | (0) |
| 2021–2022 | Leganés B | 8 | (2) |
| 2022 | Júpiter Leonés | 5 | (0) |
| 2022–2023 | Las Rozas | 26 | (10) |
| 2023– | Trival Valderas | 25 | (5) |
- * Club domestic league appearances and goals as of 13 October 2024

Marc Echarri Marín (born 4 March 1999) is a Spanish footballer who plays as a forward for Trival Valderas.

== Club career ==
Born in Manzanares el Real, Community of Madrid, Echarri finished his formation with Aravaca CF. On 7 July 2018, he moved to AD Alcorcón and was initially assigned to the reserves in the Tercera División.

Echarri made his senior debut on 9 September 2018, starting in a 0–1 home loss against AD Parla. On 4 February of the following year, after ten goalless matches, he signed for fellow league team CF Trival Valderas.

On 21 June 2019, Echarri joined another reserve team, Rayo Vallecano B also in the fourth tier. He made his first-team debut the following 5 January, coming on as a late substitute for Federico Piovaccari in a 1–0 home defeat of Girona FC in the Segunda División.
