= Leonardo Ulloa =

Argentine footballer

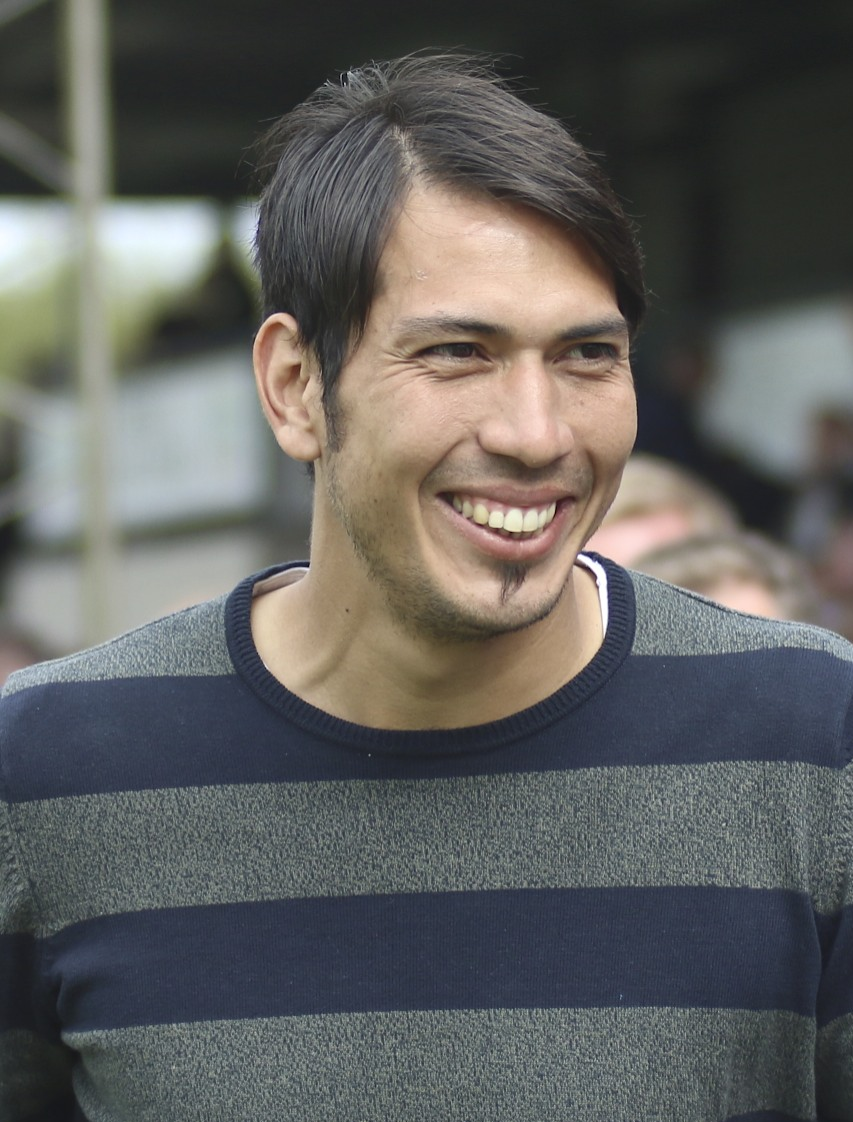
- Ulloa in 2014

Personal information
- Full name: José Leonardo Ulloa Fernández
- Date of birth: 26 July 1986 (age 40)
- Place of birth: General Roca, Argentina
- Height: 1.88 m (6 ft 2 in)
- Position: Striker

Youth career
- CAI

Senior career*
Years	Team	Apps	(Gls)
2002–2004	CAI	7	(1)
2005–2007	San Lorenzo	31	(3)
2007	Arsenal Sarandí	12	(3)
2008	Olimpo	14	(3)
2008–2010	Castellón	78	(30)
2010–2013	Almería	90	(39)
2013–2014	Brighton & Hove Albion	50	(23)
2014–2018	Leicester City	86	(18)
2018	→ Brighton & Hove Albion (loan)	10	(1)
2018–2019	Pachuca	28	(8)
2019–2021	Rayo Vallecano	28	(6)
Total		434	(135)
- * Club domestic league appearances and goals

José Leonardo Ulloa Fernández (locally [xoˈse leoˈnaɾðowˈʎoa feɾˈnandes]; born 26 July 1986) is an Argentine former professional footballer who played as a striker.

After starting out with CAI, he joined San Lorenzo in 2005, going on to spend the better part of the following years in Spain with Castellón and Almería, competing in La Liga with the last of those clubs and also being Segunda División top scorer in the 2011–12 season.

Ulloa moved to England in 2013, where he represented Brighton & Hove Albion and Leicester City. He won the Premier League with the latter side in 2015–16.

== Club career ==
=== Early years and Castellón ===
Born in General Roca, Río Negro, Ulloa started his career in 2002, playing with Primera B Nacional side Comisión de Actividades Infantiles. In 2005 he moved to the Primera División, signing for San Lorenzo where he was part of the squad that won the 2007 Clausura.

Shortly after, Ulloa joined Arsenal de Sarandí. In the summer of 2008, after a brief stint with Olimpo, he moved to Spain to play for Segunda División club Castellón, where he was reunited with compatriot and former CAI teammate José Tabares. He scored 16 goals in his debut season, his team's best and sixth in the league.

=== Almería ===
Ulloa posted similar numbers in 2009–10, but Castellón were relegated after finishing 22nd and last. In late June 2010 he moved to another club in the country, Almería, signing a five-year contract.

On 13 September 2010, in only his second official match for the Andalusians, Ulloa scored in the last minute for a 2–2 La Liga home draw against Real Sociedad, after an individual effort. The following month, against the same opponent in the Copa del Rey's round-of-32 first leg, he netted twice in the last 20 minutes to help his team come back from 2–0 to win 3–2 in the Basque Country.

On 22 December 2010, again in the domestic cup, Ulloa scored three goals and assisted on another, as Almería beat Mallorca 4–3 in the first leg, winning 8–6 on aggregate. On 16 January 2011 he took his league tally to five, netting in a 1–1 home draw against Real Madrid after finishing a move from countryman Pablo Piatti.

Ulloa was crowned the 2011–12 season's top scorer at 28 goals, but Almería failed to regain their top-flight status after finishing seventh.

=== Brighton & Hove Albion ===
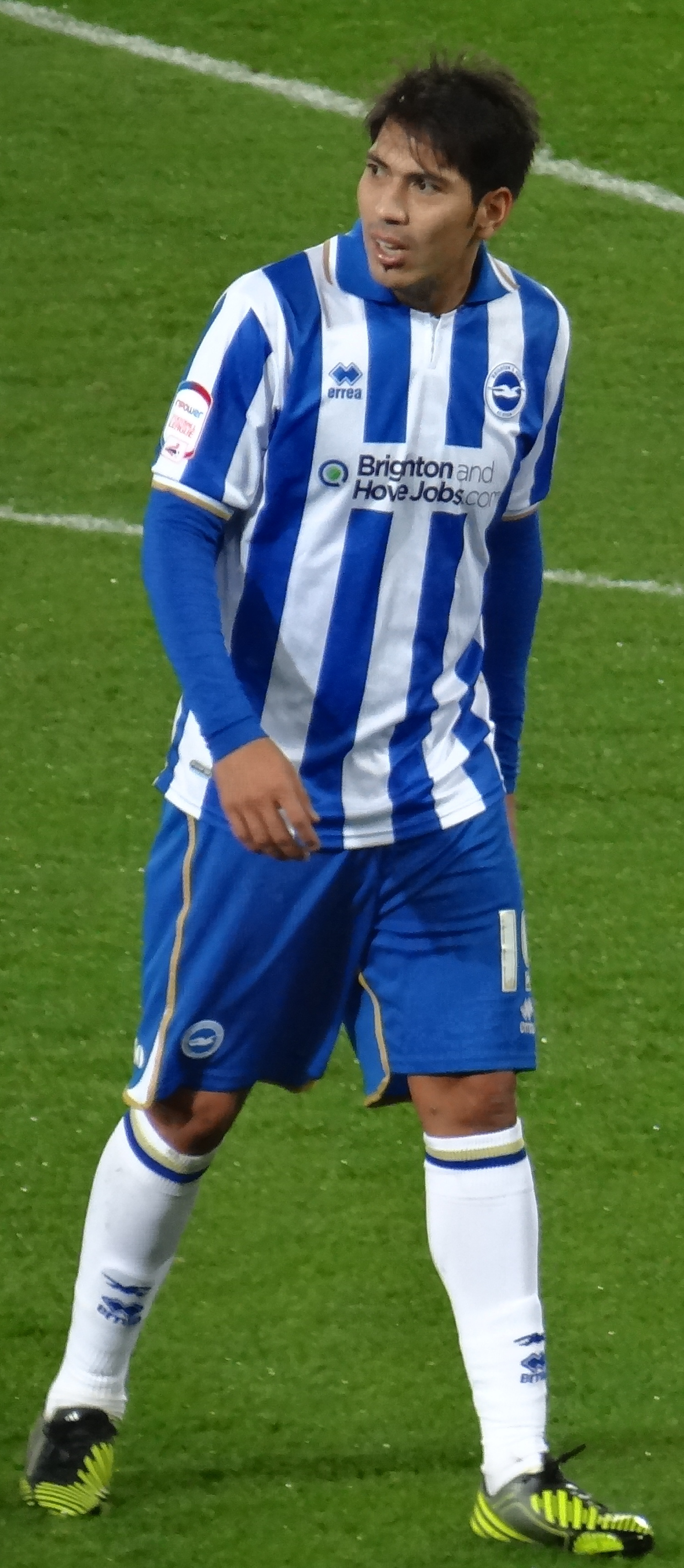
Ulloa playing for Brighton & Hove Albion in 2013

On 16 January 2013, Ulloa transferred to Championship side Brighton & Hove Albion on a four-and-a-half-year deal, for an undisclosed fee believed to be around £2 million. He scored on his debut ten days later, in a 2–3 home loss against Arsenal in the fourth round of the FA Cup.

On 2 March 2013, Ulloa became the first ever player to score a hat-trick at Falmer Stadium, during Brighton's 4–1 win over Huddersfield Town. Two weeks later, he scored twice against Crystal Palace in a 3–0 victory also at home, contributing to his team's first home win in the M23 derby since 1988; manager Gus Poyet described him as "different class", and he continued his scoring run on the 30th, with his ninth goal in 12 matches coming in a 2–2 draw at Nottingham Forest.

On 27 April 2013, Ulloa scored the goal that confirmed Brighton's place in the Championship play-offs, heading the 88th-minute winner to secure a 2–1 away defeat of Leeds United. The following season, on 3 May 2014 and again through a header, he netted in the last minute to once again send them to the play-offs, helping to a comeback at Nottingham Forest and 2–1 win.

=== Leicester City ===
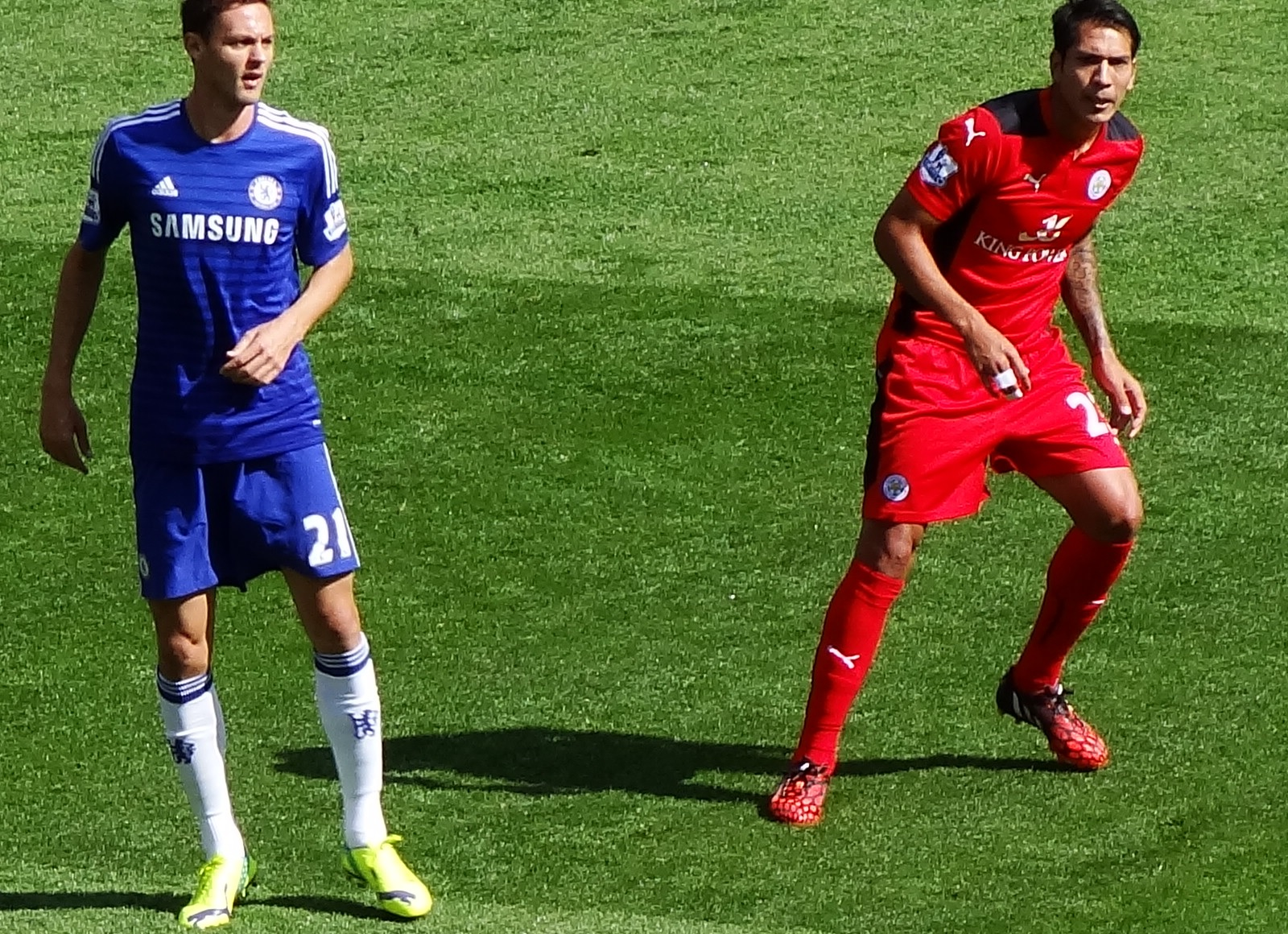
Ulloa (right) playing for Leicester City in 2014

On 22 July 2014, Ulloa joined Leicester City on a four-year contract for a club record £8 million, being handed the number 23 shirt. He started on his Premier League debut at home to Everton on 16 August, and scored after 22 minutes as his team twice came from a goal down to secure a 2–2 draw. He found the net in his third appearance, against Arsenal on 31 August for another home draw (1–1), and scored the only goal of the match to help defeat Stoke City for the side's first win of the campaign.

On 21 September 2014, Ulloa contributed a brace in a 5–3 home win over Manchester United. After nine games without a goal, he scored but in a 2–1 loss at Aston Villa.

During January 2015, Ulloa scored in FA Cup victories over Newcastle United and Tottenham, helping the Foxes to reach the fifth round. On 18 April, he netted his first league goal of 2015 in a 2–0 win against Swansea City which saw Leicester move off the bottom of the table for the first time since November 2014. Two weeks later, he scored twice in the 3–0 victory over Newcastle for his team's fifth win from six matches.

Under Claudio Ranieri, Ulloa played mostly second-fiddle to Shinji Okazaki and Jamie Vardy in 2015–16, but still managed 29 games and six goals as Leicester won the first top-flight league title of their 132-year history, including one in the last minute of a 1–0 defeat of Norwich City at the King Power Stadium on 27 February 2016 which caused celebrations that led to a small earthquake registering on the Richter scale.

Ulloa struggled to break into the first team following the signings of Ahmed Musa and Islam Slimani in 2016–17, prompting an enquiry from Swansea City. He did not start his first league match of the season until 2 January 2017, in a goalless draw against Middlesbrough, and late into that month he submitted a transfer request, which led to bids from Alavés and Sunderland; these were rejected, as well as a subsequent loan offer from Galatasaray, leading the player to express in a Twitter post that he felt "betrayed by Ranieri" and vowed not to play for Leicester again. A total of three bids from Sunderland, ranging from £3 million to £7.5 million, were rejected as Leicester were unwilling to sell him to a relegation rival.

On 24 August 2017, aged 31, Ulloa signed a new contract at Leicester, extending his link until June 2019. He struggled to break into the first team during the season, only totalling 19 minutes in the league in four substitute appearances; thus, on 29 January 2018, he completed a loan move to Brighton & Hove Albion for his second spell.

Ulloa scored his first goal for Brighton since 2014 on 17 February 2018, in a home 3–1 home win against Coventry City in the FA Cup. His first in the league came on 9 May, but in a 3–1 loss away to Manchester City; shortly after, having appeared in 12 competitive matches, he revealed he was hoping to earn a permanent move.

=== Pachuca ===
On 10 August 2018, Ulloa joined Liga MX club Pachuca. His first goal for his new team, a header, opened the scoring in a 2–0 win over Celaya in the Copa MX.

=== Rayo Vallecano ===
On 30 August 2019, Pachuca announced Ulloa's departure to Rayo Vallecano via Twitter.

== International career ==
In late 2014 Ulloa, whose grandfather was born in Chile, had an offer from Chile national team manager Jorge Sampaoli to become naturalized and represent them, but he declined it.

== Personal life ==
Ulloa was one of up to 20 top footballers named in the Panama Papers, a 2016 leak of offshore accounts. In 2008, while at San Lorenzo, he ceded his economic and image rights to Jump Drive Sports Rights LLC, registered in Washington in the name of two companies registered in Samoa. The director of the company at the time of the leak was on trial for fraud; it was alleged he took money that was due to Ulloa.

== Career statistics ==
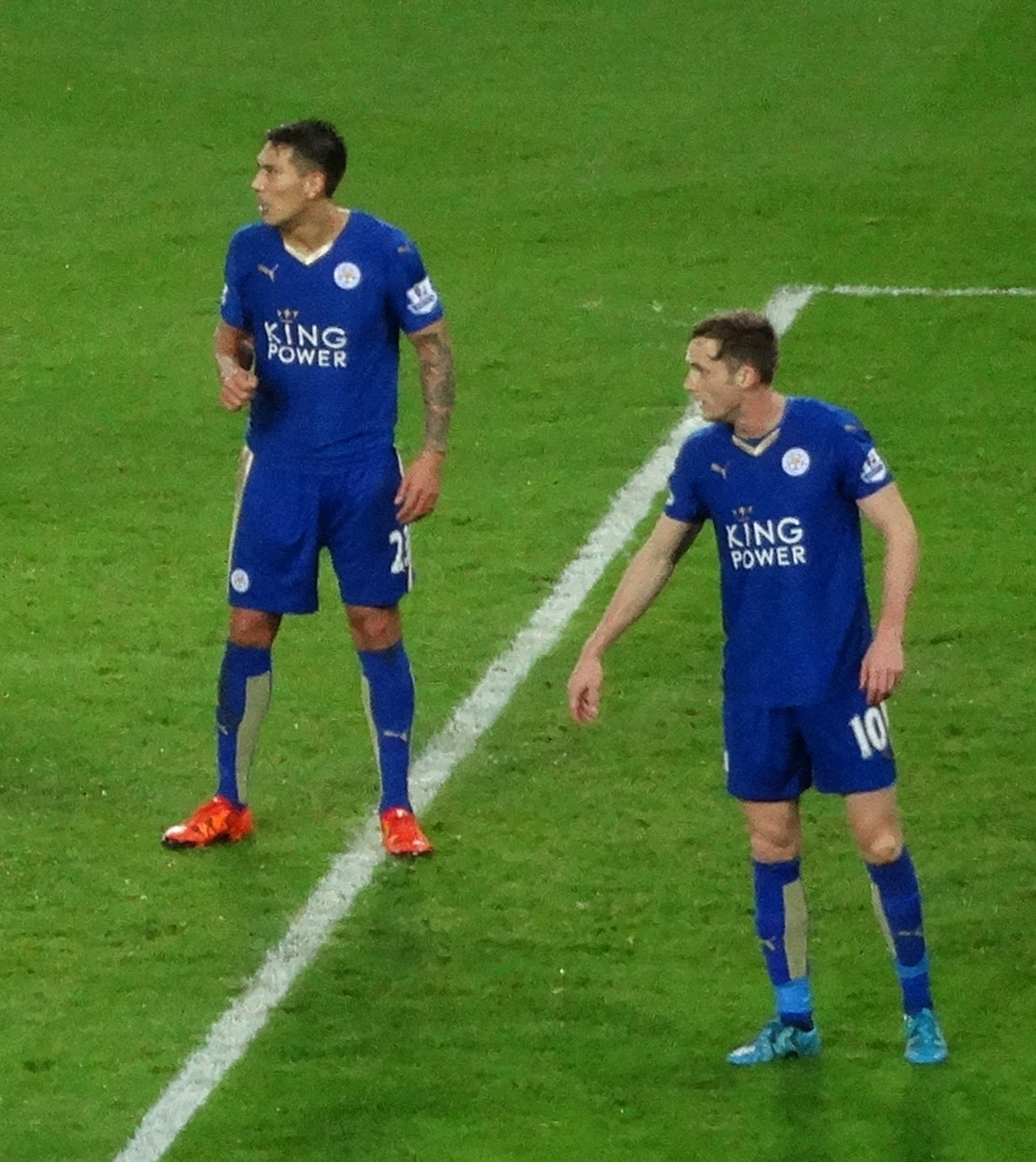
Ulloa (left) playing for Leicester City in 2015

Appearances and goals by club, season and competition
Club	Season	League			National Cup (Note: Includes Copa del Rey, FA Cup and Copa MX)		League Cup (Note: Includes Football League Cup/EFL Cup)		Other		Total	
Club	Season	Division	Apps	Goals	Apps	Goals	Apps	Goals	Apps	Goals	Apps	Goals
CAI	2002–03	Primera B Nacional	2	0	—		—		—		2	0
CAI	2003–04	Primera B Nacional	5	1	—		—		—		5	1
CAI	Total		7	1	—		—		—		7	1
San Lorenzo	2004–05	Argentine Primera División	0	0	—		—		—		0	0
San Lorenzo	2005–06	Argentine Primera División	12	1	—		—		—		12	1
San Lorenzo	2006–07	Argentine Primera División	19	2	—		—		—		19	2
San Lorenzo	Total		31	3	—		—		—		31	3
Arsenal Sarandí	2007–08	Argentine Primera División	12	3	—		—		—		12	3
Olimpo	2007–08	Argentine Primera División	14	3	—		—		—		14	3
Castellón	2008–09	Segunda División	40	16	0	0	—		—		40	16
Castellón	2009–10	Segunda División	38	14	1	0	—		—		39	14
Castellón	Total		78	30	1	0	—		—		79	30
Almería	2010–11	La Liga	34	7	6	6	—		—		40	13
Almería	2011–12	Segunda División	38	28	2	1	—		—		40	29
Almería	2012–13	Segunda División	18	4	4	2	—		—		22	6
Almería	Total		90	39	12	9	—		—		102	48
Brighton & Hove Albion	2012–13	Championship	17	9	1	1	—		2 (Note: Appearances in Championship play-offs)	0	20	10
Brighton & Hove Albion	2013–14	Championship	33	14	2	2	1	0	2	0	38	16
Brighton & Hove Albion	Total		50	23	3	3	1	0	4	0	58	26
Leicester City	2014–15	Premier League	37	11	3	2	0	0	—		40	13
Leicester City	2015–16	Premier League	29	6	2	0	2	0	—		33	6
Leicester City	2016–17	Premier League	16	1	1	0	1	0	5 (Note: One appearance in FA Community Shield, four appearances in UEFA Champions League)	0	23	1
Leicester City	2017–18	Premier League	4	0	0	0	2	0	—		6	0
Leicester City	Total		86	18	6	2	5	0	5	0	102	20
Leicester City U21/U23	2016–17	—			—		—		1 (Note: Appearance in EFL Trophy)	0	1	0
Leicester City U21/U23	2017–18	—			—		—		1	0	1	0
Leicester City U21/U23	Total	—			—		—		2	0	2	0
Brighton & Hove Albion (loan)	2017–18	Premier League	10	1	2	1	—		—		12	2
Pachuca	2018–19	Liga MX	25	8	7	6	—		—		32	14
Rayo Vallecano	2019–20	Segunda División	17	6	2	0	—		—		19	6
Rayo Vallecano	2020–21	Segunda División	11	0	1	0	—		1 (Note: Appearance in La Liga play-offs)	0	13	0
Rayo Vallecano	Total		28	6	3	0	—		1	0	32	6
Career total			431	135	34	21	6	0	12	0	483	156

== Honours ==
San Lorenzo

- Argentine Primera División: 2007 Clausura

Arsenal Sarandí

- Copa Sudamericana: 2007

Leicester City

- Premier League: 2015–16

Individual

- Segunda División top scorer: 2011–12
