= Yacine Qasmi =

Moroccan footballer (born 1991)

Personal information
- Full name: Yacine Qasmi
- Date of birth: 3 January 1991 (age 35)
- Place of birth: Pontoise, France
- Height: 1.86 m (6 ft 1 in)
- Position: Striker

Team information
- Current team: Alcoyano
- Number: 24

Youth career
- 1996–1998: Cosmo Taverny
- 1998–2009: Paris Saint-Germain

Senior career*
Years	Team	Apps	(Gls)
2009–2011	Paris Saint-Germain II	36	(12)
2010–2011	Paris Saint-Germain	0	(0)
2011–2012	Rennes II	23	(8)
2012–2013	Getafe B	30	(5)
2013–2014	Sporting B	30	(5)
2014–2015	Sestao River	19	(3)
2015	Compostela	13	(6)
2015–2016	Alcoyano	27	(11)
2016–2017	Mérida	32	(4)
2017–2019	Melilla	57	(21)
2019–2020	Elche	39	(9)
2020–2022	Rayo Vallecano	52	(6)
2022–2023	Leganés	45	(5)
2023–2024	Eibar	11	(1)
2024–	Alcoyano	18	(0)

International career
2010	Morocco U20	12	(3)
- * Club domestic league appearances and goals as of 10 June 2025

Yacine Qasmi (Arabic: ياسين قاسمي; born 3 January 1991) is a professional footballer who plays as a striker for Primera Federación club Alcoyano. Born in France, he represented Morocco at youth international level.

After one substitute appearance for Paris Saint-Germain, he spent most of his career in Spain, primarily in Segunda División B. From 2019, he made over 140 Segunda División appearances for Elche, Rayo Vallecano, Leganés and Eibar, playing one La Liga game for the second of those clubs.

== Early life ==
Qasmi was born in Pontoise, France, to Moroccan parents. He acquired French nationality on 24 March 1993, through the collective effect of his parents' naturalization.

== Club career ==
=== Early career ===
Qasmi joined Paris Saint-Germain's youth setup in 1999, from Cosmo de Taverny. After appearing as a senior with the reserves, he made his professional debut on 15 December 2010, coming on as a second-half substitute for Mathieu Bodmer in a 1–1 UEFA Europa League away draw against FC Karpaty Lviv.

On 6 July 2011, Qasmi signed a one-year deal with another reserve team, Rennes II. In the 2012 summer, he went on a trial at S.L. Benfica, initially appearing for the B-team.

=== Segunda División B ===
Qasmi signed a 1+2 contract with Getafe CF in August 2012, being assigned to the reserves in Segunda División B. He remained for six more years in Spain's third tier, representing Sporting de Gijón B, Sestao River Club, SD Compostela, CD Alcoyano, Mérida AD and UD Melilla.

=== Segunda División ===
On 6 February 2019, Qasmi signed for Elche CF in Segunda División, as the club paid his €300,000 release clause. He made his professional league debut three days later in a 2–1 home loss to Real Oviedo, as a 78th-minute substitute for Benjamín Martínez; on 24 February he scored his first goal in such a competition, in a 2–2 draw at CD Lugo.

On 31 January 2020, Qasmi agreed to a two-and-a-half-year contract with Rayo Vallecano still in the second division. Aged 30 on 22 August the following year, he made his La Liga bow at the end of a 1–0 loss at Real Sociedad.

On 28 January 2022, after just one league appearance during the campaign, Qasmi terminated his contract with Rayo, and agreed to a 18-month deal with second division side CD Leganés the following day. On 12 September 2023, he moved to SD Eibar on a one-year contract.

== International career ==
Qasmi appeared for Morocco under-20 team in a friendly match against Burkina Faso in July 2010.

== Career statistics ==
=== Club ===
As of match played 22 August 2021

Appearances and goals by club, season and competition
Club	Season	League			National Cup		Continental		Other		Total	
Club	Season	Division	Apps	Goals	Apps	Goals	Apps	Goals	Apps	Goals	Apps	Goals
PSG II	2009–10	Championnat de France Amateur	10	2	—		—		—		10	2
PSG II	2010–11	Championnat de France Amateur	26	10	—		—		—		26	10
PSG II	Total		36	12	0	0	0	0	0	0	36	12
PSG	2010–11	Ligue 1	0	0	0	0	1 (Note: Appearance(s) in UEFA Europa League)	0	—		1	0
Rennes II	2011–12	Championnat de France Amateur 2	?	?	—		—		—		0	0
Getafe B	2012–13	Segunda División B	30	5	—		—		—		30	5
Sporting B	2013–14	Segunda División	30	5	—		—		—		30	5
Sporting de Gijón	2013–14	Segunda División	0	0	0	0	—		—		0	0
Sestao River	2014–15	Segunda División B	19	3	1	0	—		—		20	3
Compostela	2014–15	Segunda División B	13	6	0	0	—		—		13	6
Alcoyano	2015–16	Segunda División B	27	11	1	0	—		—		28	11
Mérida	2016–17	Segunda División B	32	4	0	0	—		—		32	4
Melilla	2017–18	Segunda División B	35	11	1	0	—		—		36	11
Melilla	2018–19	Segunda División B	22	10	5	2	—		—		27	12
Melilla	Total		57	21	6	2	0	0	0	0	63	0
Elche	2018–19	Segunda División	15	2	0	0	—		—		0	0
Elche	2019–20	Segunda División	24	7	3	0	—		—		0	0
Elche	Total		39	9	3	0	0	0	0	0	42	9
Rayo Vallecano	2019–20	Segunda División	15	2	0	0	—		—		15	2
Rayo Vallecano	2020–21	Segunda División	36	4	3	2	—		4 (Note: Appearance(s) in Promotion Playoffs)	0	43	6
Rayo Vallecano	2021–22	La Liga	1	0	0	0	—		—		1	0
Rayo Vallecano	Total		52	6	3	2	0	0	4	0	59	8
Career total			335	82	14	4	1	0	4	0	354	86
