= Iván Martos =

Spanish footballer

Personal information
- Full name: Iván Martos Campillo
- Date of birth: 15 May 1997 (age 29)
- Place of birth: Manresa, Spain
- Height: 1.82 m (6 ft 0 in)
- Position: Left back

Team information
- Current team: IMT
- Number: 3

Youth career
- 2007–2011: Barcelona
- 2011–2013: Damm
- 2013: Gimnàstic Manresa
- 2013–2016: Almería

Senior career*
Years	Team	Apps	(Gls)
2015–2018	Almería B	89	(8)
2018–2023	Almería	74	(0)
2020–2021	→ Rayo Vallecano (loan)	12	(0)
2023	→ Cartagena (loan)	16	(1)
2023–2024	Huesca	25	(0)
2024–2025	Eldense	18	(0)
2026–	IMT	21	(1)
- * Club domestic league appearances and goals as of 19 August 2026

Iván Martos Campillo (born 15 May 1997) is a Spanish professional footballer who plays for Serbian SuperLiga club IMT. Mainly a left back, he can also play as a central defender.

== Club career ==
Born in Manresa, Barcelona, Catalonia, Martos joined UD Almería's youth setup on 31 July 2013, after previous stints at Club Gimnàstic de Manresa, CF Damm and FC Barcelona. He made his senior debut with the reserves on 8 November 2015, starting in a 1–1 Segunda División B home draw against UD Melilla.

Martos scored his first senior goal on 18 February 2017, netting his team's second in a 3–2 home win against River Melilla CF in the Tercera División. He made his first-team debut on 11 September 2018, starting in a 2–1 away defeat of Málaga CF in the season's Copa del Rey.

On 6 March 2019, after becoming a regular starter, Martos renewed his contract until 2022 and was promoted to the main squad. The following 16 March, he further extended his link until 2024.

On 5 October 2020, Martos moved to fellow second division side Rayo Vallecano on a one-year loan deal. After helping Rayo in their promotion to La Liga, he returned to the Andalusians for the 2021–22 campaign, where he was mainly a backup option before suffering a knee injury in March 2022; his side also promoted to the top tier, but as champions.

Martos returned to trainings in October 2022, and was loaned to FC Cartagena in the second division on 19 January 2023, for the remainder of the season. He terminated his contract with the Rojiblancos on 22 July, and signed a one-year deal with SD Huesca three days later.

On 21 August 2024, free agent Martos agreed to a one-year contract with CD Eldense also in the second division.
