= Manu Navarro =

Spanish footballer

Personal information
- Full name: Manuel Navarro Sánchez
- Date of birth: 9 October 2000 (age 26)
- Place of birth: Móstoles, Spain
- Position: Midfielder

Team information
- Current team: Marchamalo

Youth career
- 2006–2016: Móstoles
- 2016–2018: Rayo Vallecano

Senior career*
Years	Team	Apps	(Gls)
2016	Móstoles	1	(0)
2018–2022	Rayo Vallecano B	101	(5)
2021–2022	Rayo Vallecano	1	(0)
2022–2023	Hércules B	7	(0)
2022–2023	Hércules	3	(0)
2023–2024	Rayo Vallecano B	31	(1)
2024–2025	Móstoles	22	(1)
2025–	Marchamalo	10	(1)
- * Club domestic league appearances and goals as of 8 November 2025

Manuel "Manu" Navarro Sánchez (born 9 October 2000) is a Spanish footballer who plays as a central midfielder for Tercera Federación club Marchamalo.

== Club career ==
Navarro was born in Móstoles, Community of Madrid, and joined CD Móstoles URJC's youth setup at the age of six. He made his senior debut with the main squad at the age of just 16 on 8 May 2016, being sent off in a 1–1 Tercera División away draw against CDC Moscardó.

In June 2016, Navarro moved to Rayo Vallecano, returning to the youth setup. Promoted to the reserves for the 2018–19 season, he immediately became a starter for the side before struggling with an ankle injury during most of the 2019–20 campaign.

Navarro made his first team debut for Rayo on 16 January 2021, coming on as a late substitute for Álvaro García in a 2–0 home win against Elche CF, for the season's Copa del Rey. He made his Segunda División debut on 30 March, replacing Andrés Martín in a 1–0 home loss against Sporting de Gijón.

On 27 July 2022, Navarro signed for Segunda Federación side Hércules CF. On 30 August 2023, he returned to Rayo and their B-team, now in Tercera Federación.
