= Martín Pascual =

Spanish footballer

Personal information
- Full name: Martín Pascual Castillo
- Date of birth: 4 August 1999 (age 27)
- Place of birth: Madrid, Spain
- Height: 1.90 m (6 ft 3 in)
- Position: Centre back

Team information
- Current team: Dinamo București
- Number: 44

Youth career
- –2017: Unión Adarve
- 2017–2018: Rayo Vallecano

Senior career*
Years	Team	Apps	(Gls)
2018–2019	Rayo Vallecano B	30	(5)
2019–2024	Rayo Vallecano	15	(0)
2021–2022	→ Villarreal B (loan)	22	(0)
2022–2023	→ Ibiza (loan)	34	(0)
2024–2025	Atlético Madrid B	34	(0)
2025–2026	Mirandés	23	(0)
2026–	Dinamo București	14	(4)
- * Club domestic league appearances and goals as of 6 November 2026

Martín Pascual Castillo (born 4 August 1999) is a Spanish professional footballer who plays as a centre back for Liga I club Dinamo București.

== Career ==
Born in Madrid, Pascual joined Rayo Vallecano's youth setup in 2017, from AD Unión Adarve. He made his senior debut with the reserves on 26 August 2018, starting in a 2–1 Tercera División home win against CD San Fernando de Henares.

Pascual scored his first senior goal on 2 December 2018, netting the opener in a 3–2 loss at DAV Santa Ana, and finished the campaign with five goals in 30 appearances. He made his professional debut the following 17 August, starting and being sent off in a 2–2 home draw against CD Mirandés in the Segunda División.

On 19 July 2021, after contributing with six league appearances as his side achieved promotion to La Liga, Pascual was loaned to Villarreal CF B for one year. On 3 July 2022, after another promotion, he moved to second division side UD Ibiza also in a temporary deal.

Upon returning, Pascual was assigned to the main squad of Rayo in La Liga, but only featured for the club in Copa del Rey matches. On 18 August 2024, he signed a one-year deal with Atlético Madrid B in Primera Federación.

On 19 August 2025, Pascual agreed to a one-year contract with CD Mirandés.

On 25 June 2026, Liga I club Dinamo București announced the signing of Pascual.

== Career statistics ==
As of 6 November 2026

Appearances and goals by club, season and competition
Club	Season	League			National cup (Note: Includes Copa del Rey, Cupa României)		Europe		Other		Total	
Club	Season	Division	Apps	Goals	Apps	Goals	Apps	Goals	Apps	Goals	Apps	Goals
Rayo Vallecano B	2018–19	Tercera División	30	5	—		—		—		30	5
Rayo Vallecano	2019–20	Segunda División	9	0	4	0	—		—		13	0
Rayo Vallecano	2020–21	Segunda División	6	0	2	0	—		0	0	8	0
Rayo Vallecano	2023–24	La Liga	0	0	4	0	—		—		4	0
Rayo Vallecano	Total		15	0	10	0	—		0	0	25	0
Villarreal B (loan)	2021–22	Primera División RFEF	22	0	—		—		2 (Note: Appearances in Primera División RFEF promotion play-offs)	0	24	0
Ibiza (loan)	2022–23	Segunda División	34	0	1	0	—		—		35	0
Atlético Madrid B	2024–25	Primera Federación	34	0	—		—		—		34	0
Mirandés	2025–26	Segunda División	23	0	1	0	—		—		24	0
Dinamo București	2026–27	Liga I	14	4	1	0	—		—		15	4
Career total			172	9	13	0	—		2	0	187	9
