= 2022–23 Rayo Vallecano season =

Rayo Vallecano
2022–23 season
- Owner: Raúl Martín Presa
- President: Raúl Martín Presa
- Head coach: Andoni Iraola
- Stadium: Vallecas
- La Liga: 11th
- Copa del Rey: Round of 32
- Top goalscorer: League: Isi Palazón (9); All: Isi Palazón (9)
- Highest home attendance: 14,216 vs Real Madrid
- Lowest home attendance: 10,944 vs Mallorca
- Biggest win: Rayo Vallecano 5–1 Cádiz
- Biggest defeat: Elche 4–0 Rayo Vallecano
Home colours	Away colours	Third colours

The 2022–23 season was the 99th season in the history of Rayo Vallecano and their second consecutive season in the top flight. In addition to the league, the club participated in the Copa del Rey, losing in the round of 32 to second division side Sporting Gijón.

== Players ==
=== First-team squad ===
Note: Flags indicate national team as defined under FIFA eligibility rules; some limited exceptions apply. Players may hold more than one non-FIFA nationality.

No.	Pos.	Nation	Player
1	GK	MKD	Stole Dimitrievski
2	DF	ESP	Mario Hernández
3	DF	ESP	Fran García
4	MF	ESP	Mario Suárez (3rd captain)
5	DF	ESP	Alejandro Catena
6	MF	ESP	Santi Comesaña (vice-captain)
7	FW	ESP	Isi Palazón
8	FW	ARG	Óscar Trejo (captain)
9	FW	COL	Radamel Falcao
12	FW	ESP	Andrés Martín
13	GK	ESP	Diego López
14	MF	ESP	Salvi Sánchez
15	DF	ESP	Pep Chavarría

No.	Pos.	Nation	Player
16	DF	GHA	Abdul Mumin
17	MF	ESP	Unai López
18	MF	ESP	Álvaro García
19	DF	FRA	Florian Lejeune (on loan from Alavés)
20	DF	ALB	Iván Balliu
21	MF	SEN	Pathé Ciss
22	MF	ESP	José Ángel Pozo
23	MF	ESP	Óscar Valentín
24	DF	MNE	Esteban Saveljich
25	FW	ESP	Raúl de Tomás
30	GK	ESP	Miguel Morro
34	FW	ESP	Sergio Camello (on loan from Atlético Madrid)

=== Out on loan ===
Note: Flags indicate national team as defined under FIFA eligibility rules; some limited exceptions apply. Players may hold more than one non-FIFA nationality.

No.	Pos.	Nation	Player
—	DF	ESP	Jorge Moreno (on loan to Córdoba until 30 June 2023)
—	DF	ESP	Martín Pascual (on loan to Ibiza until 30 June 2023)
—	MF	FRA	Randy Nteka (on loan to Elche until 30 June 2023)

No.	Pos.	Nation	Player
—	MF	ESP	Joni Montiel (on loan to Levante until 30 June 2023)
—	FW	CPV	Bebé (on loan to Zaragoza until 30 June 2023)
—	FW	ESP	Sergio Moreno (on loan to Osasuna B until 30 June 2023)

== Transfers ==
=== In ===
Date	Player	From	Type	Fee	Ref.
1 July 2022	(Spain) Salvi	Cádiz	Transfer	Free	
2 July 2022	(Spain) Diego López	RCD Espanyol	Transfer	Free	
29 July 2022	(France) Florian Lejeune	Alavés	Loan		
3 August 2022	(Spain) Sergio Camello	Atlético Madrid	Loan		
31 August 2022	(Spain) Pep Chavarría	Zaragoza	Transfer	Undisclosed	
1 September 2022	(Ghana) Abdul Mumin	(Portugal) Vitória de Guimarães	Transfer	Undisclosed	
13 September 2022	(Spain) Raúl de Tomás	Espanyol	Transfer	Undisclosed	

=== Out ===
Date	Player	To	Type	Fee	Ref.
1 July 2022	(France) Luca Zidane	Eibar	Transfer	Free	
3 July 2022	(Spain) Martín Pascual	Ibiza	Loan		
7 July 2022	(Spain) Jorge Moreno	Córdoba	Loan		
14 July 2022	(Spain) Joni Montiel	Levante	Loan		
30 August 2022	(Spain) Sergio Moreno	Osasuna B	Loan		

== Pre-season and friendlies ==
Win Draw Loss

16 July 2022 Friendly	SC Freiburg	3–0	Rayo Vallecano	Freiburg, Germany
15:00 CEST (UTC+2)	Sallai (yellow card) 8'; Siquet 17'; Petersen 43'; Ezekwem 55'	Report	F. García (yellow card) 69'	Stadium: Europa-Park Stadion

20 July 2022 Friendly	Sheffield Wednesday	0–2	Rayo Vallecano	Sheffield, England
19:00 BST (UTC+1)		Report	J. Hunt 29' (o.g.); Nteka 57'	Stadium: Hillsborough; Attendance: 4,697; Referee: Craig Pawson (England)

23 July 2022 Friendly	Birmingham City	2–2	Rayo Vallecano	Birmingham, England
15:00 BST (UTC+1)	Płacheta 15'; Bacuna 53'	Report	Palazón 29', 51'	Stadium: St Andrew's; Attendance: 2,542; Referee: Josh Smith (England)

27 July 2022 Friendly	Leganés	1–2	Rayo Vallecano	Leganés, Spain
19:30 CEST (UTC+2)	Muñoz 79'	Report	Palazón 53'; Falcao 84'	Stadium: Instalación Deportiva Butarque

31 July 2022 Friendly	Manchester United	1–1	Rayo Vallecano	Manchester, England
16:00 BST (UTC+1)	Garner (yellow card) 23'; Amad 47'	Report	U. López (yellow card) 18'; A. García 57'	Stadium: Old Trafford; Attendance: 68,663; Referee: Robert Jones (England)

5 August 2022 Friendly	Rayo Vallecano	0–0	Valladolid	Madrid, Spain
10:30 CEST (UTC+2)				Stadium: Ciudad del Fútbol de Las Rozas; Attendance: 600; Referee: Jaime Candil

22 September 2022 Trofeo Fiestas de Fuenlabrada	Fuenlabrada	1–0	Rayo Vallecano	Fuenlabrada, Spain
19:30 CEST (UTC+2)	Ruiz 45'			Stadium: Estadio Fernando Torres; Attendance: 1,500; Referee: Bueno Prieto

30 November 2022 Friendly	Fenerbahçe	3–1	Rayo Vallecano	Istanbul, Turkey
20:00 TRT (UTC+3)	Osayi-Samuel 71'; King 76' (pen.); Kadıoğlu 83'	Report	Trejo 21'	Stadium: Şükrü Saracoğlu Stadium

3 December 2022 Friendly	Galatasaray	0–1	Rayo Vallecano	Istanbul, Turkey
16:00 TRT (UTC+3)		Report	Martín 32'	Stadium: Nef Stadium

10 December 2022 Friendly	Real Sociedad	1–1	Rayo Vallecano	San Sebastián, Spain
12:00 CET (UTC+1)	Sørloth 8'	Report	Nteka 27'; Abdul Mumin (yellow card) 57'	Stadium: Anoeta; Referee: César Soto Grado

17 December 2022 Friendly	Newcastle United	2–1	Rayo Vallecano	Newcastle upon Tyne, England
12:30 GMT (UTC±0)	Longstaff 4'; Wood 69' (pen.)		Targett 75' (o.g.)	Stadium: St James' Park; Attendance: 34,956; Referee: Tom Bramall (England)

== Competitions ==
=== Overall record ===
Competition	First match	Last match	Starting round	Final position	Record							
Competition	First match	Last match	Starting round	Final position	Pld	W	D	L	GF	GA	GD	Win %
La Liga	13 August 2022	4 June 2023	Matchday 1	11th	38	13	10	15	45	53	−8	34.21
Copa del Rey	13 November 2022	3 January 2023	First round	Round of 32	3	1	1	1	3	3	+0	33.33
Total					41	14	11	16	48	56	−8	34.15

Source: Soccerway

=== La Liga ===
==== League table ====
Pos	Team	Pld	W	D	L	GF	GA	GD	Pts	Qualification or relegation
9	Mallorca	38	14	8	16	37	43	−6	50	
10	Girona	38	13	10	15	58	55	+3	49 (Note: Head-to-head points: Girona 8, Rayo Vallecano 6, Sevilla 1.)	
11	Rayo Vallecano	38	13	10	15	45	53	−8	49	
12	Sevilla	38	13	10	15	47	54	−7	49	Qualification for the Champions League group stage (Note: Sevilla qualified for the 2023–24 UEFA Champions League by winning the 2022–23 UEFA Europa League.)
13	Celta Vigo	38	11	10	17	43	53	−10	43	

Source: LaLiga Santander
Rules for classification: 1) Points; 2) Head-to-head points; 3) Head-to-head goal difference; 4) Goal difference; 5) Goals scored; 6) Fair-play points (Note: Head-to-head record is used only after all the matches between the teams in question have been played)

==== Results summary ====
Overall								Home						Away					
Pld	W	D	L	GF	GA	GD	Pts	W	D	L	GF	GA	GD	W	D	L	GF	GA	GD
38	13	10	15	45	53	−8	49	9	5	5	28	22	+6	4	5	10	17	31	−14

Source: La Liga

==== Results by round ====
Round	1	2	3	4	5	6	7	8	9	10	11	12	13	14	15	16	17	18	19	20	21	22	23	24	25	26	27	28	29	30	31	32	33	34	35	36	37	38
Ground	A	H	H	A	H	A	H	A	H	A	H	A	H	H	A	H	A	H	A	H	A	H	A	H	A	H	A	H	H	A	H	A	H	A	H	A	H	A
Result	D	W	L	L	W	L	W	L	D	D	W	W	W	D	D	L	W	L	W	W	D	D	L	D	L	D	D	L	W	L	W	L	W	L	L	L	W	L
Position	13	6	11	14	9	12	10	10	10	10	10	9	8	8	8	9	9	9	7	5	6	6	6	7	7	8	8	9	8	9	9	10	9	11	11	12	10	11

Source: La Liga
A = Away; H = Home; W = Win; D = Draw; L = Loss

==== Matches ====
The league fixtures were announced on 23 June 2022.

13 August 2022 1	Barcelona	0–0	Rayo Vallecano	Barcelona
21:00 CEST (UTC+2)	Dembélé (yellow card) 14'; Busquets (yellow card) 74' (yellow-red card) 90+3'	Report	Trejo (yellow card) 45'; Catena (yellow card) 45+5'; Lejeune (yellow card) 54'; Falcao (yellow card) 69'; Ciss (yellow card) 86'; Dimitrievski (yellow card) 89'	Stadium: Camp Nou; Attendance: 81,104; Referee: Alejandro Hernández Hernández

19 August 2022 2	Espanyol	0–2	Rayo Vallecano	Cornella de Llobregat
20:00 CEST (UTC+2)	Gil (yellow card) 7'; Gómez (red card) 30'; Oliván (yellow card) 45+3'	Report	Lejeune (yellow card) 14' (yellow-red card) 16'; Dimitrievski (yellow card) 24'; Trejo (yellow card) 36'; Palazón 40'; Ciss 59'; Valentín (yellow card) 76'	Stadium: RCDE Stadium; Attendance: 16,071; Referee: Jorge Figueroa Vázquez

27 August 2022 3	Rayo Vallecano	0–2	Mallorca	Madrid
19:30 CEST (UTC+2)	Valentín (yellow card) 66'	Report	Muriqi 13'; Grenier (yellow card) 63'; Lee 64'; Sánchez (yellow card) 73'; Copete (yellow card) 79'	Stadium: Campo de Fútbol de Vallecas; Attendance: 10,944; Referee: José María Sánchez Martínez

4 September 2022 4	Osasuna	2–1	Rayo Vallecano	Pamplona
14:00 CEST (UTC+2)	Cruz (yellow card) 41'; Oroz 54'; U. García (yellow card) 83'; R. García 90'	Report	Ciss (yellow card) 48'; A. García (yellow card) 60'; Lejeune 75'	Stadium: El Sadar; Attendance: 18,745; Referee: Alejandro Muñiz Ruiz

10 September 2022 5	Rayo Vallecano	2–1	Valencia	Madrid
14:00 CEST (UTC+2)	Palazón 5', (yellow card) 35'; Balliu (yellow card) 21'; González 52' (o.g.); Dimitrievski (yellow card) 62'; Comesaña (yellow card) 63'; Trejo (yellow card) 70'	Report	Musah (yellow card) 68'; Diakhaby 90+3'; Correia (yellow card) 90+4'	Stadium: Campo de Fútbol de Vallecas; Attendance: 12,085; Referee: Jesús Gil Manzano

17 September 2022 6	Athletic Bilbao	3–2	Rayo Vallecano	Bilbao
21:00 CEST (UTC+2)	I. Williams 14'; Sancet 28'; N. Williams 33'; D. García (yellow card) 45'	Report	Trejo 5'; Valentín (yellow card) 21'; Ciss (yellow card) 67'; Falcao 80'	Stadium: San Mamés; Attendance: 43,484; Referee: Antonio Mateu Lahoz

3 October 2022 7	Rayo Vallecano	2–1	Elche	Madrid
15:00 CEST (UTC+2)	Trejo (yellow card) 34'; Camello 40'; U. López 90+5'	Report	González (yellow card) 23'; Boyé 32', (yellow card) 69'; Quina (yellow card) 47'; Badía (yellow card) 65'; Lirola (yellow card) 81'; Ponce (yellow card) 83'; Morente (yellow card) 89'; Clerc (yellow card) 90+1'	Stadium: Campo de Fútbol de Vallecas; Attendance: 11,662; Referee: Jorge Figueroa Vázquez

8 October 2022 8	Almería	3–1	Rayo Vallecano	Almería
14:00 CEST (UTC+2)	Robertone 8'; Babić 17'; Touré 39'; Costa (yellow card) 66'; Embarba (yellow card) 70' (yellow-red card) 87'	Report	Salvi (yellow card) 45+1'; Valentín (yellow card) 57'; Catena 81'	Stadium: Power Horse Stadium; Attendance: 10,783; Referee: Pablo González Fuertes

14 October 2022 9	Rayo Vallecano	0–0	Getafe	Madrid
21:00 CEST (UTC+2)	Trejo (penalty missed) 53'; Catena (yellow card) 81'; Bebé (yellow card) 85'	Report	Angileri (yellow card) 24'; Mitrović (yellow card) 42'; Algobia (yellow card) 83'	Stadium: Campo de Fútbol de Vallecas; Attendance: 13,076; Referee: Mario Melero López

18 October 2022 10	Atlético Madrid	1–1	Rayo Vallecano	Madrid
21:00 CEST (UTC+2)	Morata 20'; Savić (yellow card) 47'; Saúl (yellow card) 88'; Giménez (yellow card) 90+1'	Report	Falcao 90+2' (pen.)	Stadium: Cívitas Metropolitano; Attendance: 46,803; Referee: Javier Iglesias Villanueva

22 October 2022 11	Rayo Vallecano	5–1	Cádiz	Madrid
14:00 CEST (UTC+2)	Trejo (yellow card) 31'; Palazón 44' (pen.); Á. García 45+1'; Lejeune 63', 89'; Camello 79'; Nteka (red card) 87'	Report	Sobrino (yellow card) 37'; Carcelén (red card) 42'; Alcaraz (yellow card) 52' (yellow-red card) 61'; Pérez (yellow card) 74'; Balliu 82' (o.g.)	Stadium: Campo de Fútbol de Vallecas; Attendance: 12,975; Referee: Alejandro Muñiz Ruiz

29 October 2022 12	Sevilla	0–1	Rayo Vallecano	Seville
18:30 CEST (UTC+2)	Isco (yellow card) 68'; Bounou (yellow card) 76'; Dmitrović (yellow card) 78'; Suso (yellow card) 79'; Navas (yellow card) 86'; Marcão (yellow card) 90+3'	Report	Á. García 61'; Catena (yellow card) 63'	Stadium: Ramón Sánchez Pizjuán; Attendance: 36,601; Referee: Antonio Mateu Lahoz

7 November 2022 13	Rayo Vallecano	3–2	Real Madrid	Madrid
21:00 CET (UTC+1)	Catena (yellow card) 2'; Comesaña 5'; Á. García 44'; Trejo (yellow card) 48', (goal) 67' (pen.); Balliu (yellow card) 87'; Chavarría (yellow card) 90+1'	Report	Vinícius (yellow card) 11'; Modrić 37' (pen.), (yellow card) 60'; Militão 41'; Carvajal (yellow card) 65'; Vázquez (yellow card) 90+9'; Rodrygo (yellow card) 70'	Stadium: Campo de Fútbol de Vallecas; Attendance: 14,216; Referee: Juan Martínez Munuera

10 November 2022 14	Rayo Vallecano	0–0	Celta Vigo	Madrid
19:00 CET (UTC+1)	Comesaña (yellow card) 25'; A. García (yellow card) 40'; Falcao (yellow card) 42'; Lejeune (yellow card) 43'; Valentín (yellow card) 54'; Salvi (yellow card) 87'; Catena (yellow card) 90+6'	Report	Paciência (yellow card) 53'	Stadium: Campo de Fútbol de Vallecas; Attendance: 12,419; Referee: José Luis Munuera Montero

29 December 2022 15	Girona	2–2	Rayo Vallecano	Girona
17:00 CET (UTC+1)	Martínez (yellow card) 13'; Castellanos 34' (pen.); Sáiz 75' (pen.); Romeu (yellow card) 77'; Stuani (yellow card) 79'	Report	Camello 2'; Palazón 62', (yellow card) 75'; Falcao (yellow card) 86'	Stadium: Estadi Montilivi; Attendance: 11,451; Referee: Jorge Figueroa Vázquez

8 January 2023 16	Rayo Vallecano	1–2	Real Betis	Madrid
16:15 CET (UTC+1)	Camello 20'; Á. García (yellow card) 51'; Trejo (yellow card) 57'; Valentín (yellow card) 83'	Report	Balliu 7' (o.g.); Luiz Henrique 40', (yellow card) 82'; Carvalho (yellow card) 53'	Stadium: Campo de Fútbol de Vallecas; Attendance: 13,119; Referee: Isidro Díaz de Mera Escuderos

14 January 2023 17	Valladolid	0–1	Rayo Vallecano	Valladolid
14:00 CET (UTC+1)	Monchu (yellow card) 32'; Guardiola (yellow card) 45+4'	Report	Palazón (penalty missed) 33', 65', (yellow card) 80'; Camello (yellow card) 75'	Stadium: José Zorrilla; Attendance: 19,969; Referee: Mario Melero López

21 January 2023 18	Rayo Vallecano	0–2	Real Sociedad	Madrid
14:00 CET (UTC+1)		Report	Sørloth 15'; Barrenetxea 36'	Stadium: Campo de Fútbol de Vallecas; Attendance: 12,874; Referee: Antonio Mateu Lahoz

30 January 2023 19	Villarreal	0–1	Rayo Vallecano	Villarreal
21:00 CET (UTC+1)	Foyth (yellow card) 66'; Baena (yellow card) 90+5'	Report	Ciss (yellow card) 35'; Martín (yellow card) 52'; Camello 70'; U. López (yellow card) 87'	Stadium: Estadio de la Cerámica; Attendance: 13,789; Referee: Juan Luis Pulido Santana

6 February 2023 20	Rayo Vallecano	2–0	Almería	Madrid
21:00 CET (UTC+1)	Balliu (yellow card) 17'; Trejo (yellow card) 25'; Ely 54' (o.g.); Catena (yellow card) 57'; Á. García 63'	Report	Baptistão (yellow card) 13'; Akieme (yellow card) 31'; Robertone (yellow card) 45+1'	Stadium: Vallecas; Attendance: 11,783; Referee: César Soto Grado

12 February 2023 21	Getafe	1–1	Rayo Vallecano	Getafe
14:00 CET (UTC+1)	Aleñá (yellow card) 45+3' (yellow-red card) 54'; Mayoral (penalty missed) 51'; Ünal 77'; Álvarez (yellow card) 86'; Arambarri (yellow card) 90'	Report	Comesaña (yellow card) 4'; Arambarri 38' (o.g.); Valentín (yellow card) 43'; A. García (yellow card) 45+1'; Balliu (yellow card) 50'; De Tomás (penalty missed) 87'	Stadium: Coliseum Alfonso Pérez; Attendance: 11,812; Referee: Isidro Díaz de Mera

19 February 2023 22	Rayo Vallecano	1–1	Sevilla	Madrid
16:15 CET (UTC+1)	F. García (yellow card) 38'; Lejeune (yellow card) 49', (goal) 65'; Palazón (yellow card) 69'; Catena (yellow card) 90+4'	Report	Suso 29'; En-Nesyri (yellow card) 85'	Stadium: Vallecas; Attendance: 13,294; Referee: Jesús Gil Manzano

25 February 2023 23	Cádiz	1–0	Rayo Vallecano	Cádiz
16:15 CET (UTC+1)	Alcaraz (yellow card) 55'; Espino (yellow card) 59'; Guardiola 74'; Escalante (yellow card) 90+12'	Report	De Tomás (yellow card) 51'; Catena (yellow card) 58' (yellow-red card) 90+6'; Falcao (yellow card) 90'	Stadium: Nuevo Mirandilla; Attendance: 16,703; Referee: Alejandro Muñiz Ruiz

5 March 2023 24	Rayo Vallecano	0–0	Athletic Bilbao	Madrid
18:30 CET (UTC+1)	Mumin (yellow card) 21'	Report	Sancet (red card) 90+3'	Stadium: Vallecas; Attendance: 12,979; Referee: Mario Melero López

11 March 2023 25	Celta Vigo	3–0	Rayo Vallecano	Vigo
18:30 CET (UTC+1)	Beltrán (yellow card) 11'; Aspas 51', 85'; Ciss 52' (o.g.); Óscar (yellow card) 75'	Report	Comesaña (yellow card) 23'; Balliu (yellow card) 45+1'; Lejeune (yellow card) 90+1'	Stadium: Abanca-Balaídos; Attendance: 14,451; Referee: Juan Luis Pulido Santana

18 March 2023 26	Rayo Vallecano	2–2	Girona	Madrid
16:15 CET (UTC+1)	Catena (yellow card) 7'; Hernández (yellow card) 18'; Palazón 23'; Trejo 34', (penalty missed) 41'	Report	Tsyhankov 29', 52'; Martínez (yellow card) 37'; López (yellow card) 71'	Stadium: Vallecas; Attendance: 12,163; Referee: Pablo González Fuertes

3 April 2023 27	Valencia	1–1	Rayo Vallecano	Valencia
21:00 CEST (UTC+2)	Correia (yellow card) 27'; Kluivert (yellow card) 36', (goal) 82' (pen.)	Report	Comesaña 9'; Valentín (yellow card) 23'; Balliu (yellow card) 81'; Catena (yellow card) 90+7'	Stadium: Mestalla; Attendance: 39,769; Referee: Jorge Figueroa Vázquez

9 April 2023 28	Rayo Vallecano	1–2	Atlético Madrid	Madrid
21:00 CEST (UTC+2)	Lejeune (red card) 62'; F. García 85'	Report	Molina 22'; Hermoso 24'	Stadium: Vallecas; Attendance: 13,512; Referee: Ricardo de Burgos Bengoetxea

14 April 2023 29	Rayo Vallecano	2–1	Osasuna	Madrid
21:00 CEST (UTC+2)	Aridane 40' (o.g.); Palazón 43'; A. García (yellow card) 48'; Catena (yellow card) 90+1'	Report	Kike (yellow card) 47'; Gómez 66', (yellow card) 88'; D. García (yellow card) 90+6'	Stadium: Vallecas; Attendance: 12,726; Referee: José Luis Munuera Montero

22 April 2023 30	Real Sociedad	2–1	Rayo Vallecano	San Sebastián
18:30 CEST (UTC+2)	Sørloth 59'; Lejeune 81' (o.g.); Muñoz (yellow card) 90+2'	Report	Palazón 57'; Valentín (yellow card) 68'; Comesaña (yellow card) 72'	Stadium: Reale Arena; Attendance: 32,054; Referee: Alejandro Muñiz Ruiz

26 April 2023 31	Rayo Vallecano	2–1	Barcelona	Madrid
22:00 CEST (UTC+2)	Á. García 19'; F. García 53'; Dimitrievski (yellow card) 90+1'	Report	Balde (yellow card) 32'; Alba (yellow card) 34'; Gavi (yellow card) 36'; Raphinha (yellow card) 61'; Lewandowski 83'	Stadium: Vallecas; Attendance: 13,657; Referee: Jesús Gil Manzano

29 April 2023 32	Elche	4–0	Rayo Vallecano	Elche
16:15 CEST (UTC+2)	Clerc (yellow card) 40'; Morente 45+1'; Boyé 52'; Fidel 53'; Gumbau 72'	Report	Lejeune (red card) 27'; A. García (yellow card) 45+5'; Saveljich (yellow card) 71'	Stadium: Martínez Valero; Attendance: 11,259; Referee: Mario Melero López

4 May 2023 33	Rayo Vallecano	2–1	Valladolid	Madrid
22:00 CEST (UTC+2)	De Tomás 48'; Camello 80'	Report	León 84'	Stadium: Vallecas; Attendance: 11,171; Referee: Isidro Díaz de Mera Escuderos

15 May 2023 34	Real Betis	3–1	Rayo Vallecano	Seville
21:00 CEST (UTC+2)	Sabaly 5', (yellow card) 45+1'; Pérez 44'; Bravo (yellow card) 72'; Pezzella (yellow card) 90+1'; Iglesias 90+6'	Report	Valentín (yellow card) 7'; Comesaña 52'; Mumin (yellow card) 82'	Stadium: Benito Villamarín; Attendance: 48,143; Referee: Juan Luis Pulido Santana

21 May 2023 35	Rayo Vallecano	1–2	Espanyol	Madrid
14:00 CEST (UTC+2)	Trejo (yellow card) 40'; De Tomás 42'; Catena (yellow card) 70'	Report	Darder 23'; Cabrera (yellow card) 39'; Melamed 59'; Gil (yellow card) 85'	Stadium: Vallecas; Attendance: 12,142; Referee: Alejandro Hernández Hernández

24 May 2023 36	Real Madrid	2–1	Rayo Vallecano	Madrid
19:30 CEST (UTC+2)	Benzema 31'; Carvajal (yellow card) 60'; Rodrygo 89'	Report	Á. García (yellow card) 33'; U. López (yellow card) 51'; Comesaña (yellow card) 53'; De Tomás 84'	Stadium: Santiago Bernabéu; Attendance: 45,811; Referee: Jesús Gil Manzano

28 May 2023 37	Rayo Vallecano	2–1	Villarreal	Madrid
19:00 CEST (UTC+2)	De Tomás 56', (yellow card) 68'; Palazón 63'; Valentín (yellow card) 68'; Catena (yellow card) 90+4'	Report	Parejo (yellow card) 40'; Pedraza (yellow card) 59'; Pino (yellow card) 68'; Lo Celso (yellow card) 70', (goal) 83'; Jackson (yellow card) 90+4'	Stadium: Vallecas; Attendance: 11,085; Referee: Javier Iglesias Villanueva

4 June 2023 38	Mallorca	3–0	Rayo Vallecano	Palma
18:30 CEST (UTC+2)	Muriqi 51'; Copete 71'; Ángel 90+3'	Report		Stadium: Visit Mallorca Stadium; Attendance: 14,521; Referee: Antonio Mateu Lahoz

=== Copa del Rey ===
13 November 2022 First round	Mollerussa	1–3	Rayo Vallecano	Mollerussa
12:00 CET (UTC+1)	Magno 33'	Report	Bebé 23'; Méndez 51'; Camello 78'	Stadium: Camp Municipal; Referee: César Soto Grado

21 December 2022 Second round	Atlético Saguntino	0–0 (a.e.t.) (1–3 p)	Rayo Vallecano	Sagunto
19:00 CET (UTC+1)	Acevedo (yellow card) 17'; Ramón (yellow card) 61'; Álvarez (yellow card) 80'; Esteve (yellow card) 120+1'	Report		Stadium: Morvedre; Attendance: 2,000; Referee: Guillermo Cuadra Fernández
	Penalties
	Torrent (penalty missed); Carlos David (penalty missed); Serrano (penalty scored); Ramón (penalty missed)		(penalty scored) Falcao; (penalty scored) Palazón; (penalty scored) Suárez

3 January 2023 Round of 32	Sporting Gijón	2–0	Rayo Vallecano	Gijón
21:00	Milovanović 57', 88'; Queipo (yellow card) 76'; Rosas (yellow card) 82'; Varane (yellow card) 85'	Report	Comesaña (yellow card) 87'; Camello (yellow card) 88'	Stadium: El Molinón; Attendance: 17,423; Referee: Juan Luis Pulido Santana

== Statistics ==
=== Appearances and goals ===
No.	Pos	Nat	Player	Total		La Liga		Copa del Rey	
No.	Pos	Nat	Player	Apps	Goals	Apps	Goals	Apps	Goals
Goalkeepers
1	GK	(North Macedonia) MKD	Stole Dimitrievski	37	0	37	0	0	0
13	GK	(Spain) ESP	Diego López	5	0	1+1	0	3	0
30	GK	(Spain) ESP	Miguel Morro	0	0	0	0	0	0
Defenders
2	DF	(Spain) ESP	Mario Hernández	6	0	1+2	0	3	0
3	DF	(Spain) ESP	Fran García	40	2	38	2	0+2	0
5	DF	(Spain) ESP	Alejandro Catena	37	1	35	1	2	0
15	DF	(Spain) ESP	Pep Chavarría	19	0	2+14	0	3	0
16	DF	(Ghana) GHA	Abdul Mumin	17	0	9+7	0	1	0
19	DF	(France) FRA	Florian Lejeune	32	4	31	4	1	0
20	DF	(Albania) ALB	Iván Balliu	37	0	37	0	0	0
24	DF	(Montenegro) MNE	Esteban Saveljich	2	0	0+1	0	1	0
Midfielders
4	MF	(Spain) ESP	Mario Suárez	4	0	0+2	0	2	0
6	MF	(Spain) ESP	Santi Comesaña	38	3	29+6	3	1+2	0
14	MF	(Spain) ESP	Salvi	25	0	4+20	0	1	0
17	MF	(Spain) ESP	Unai López	36	1	12+22	1	1+1	0
18	MF	(Spain) ESP	Álvaro García	38	5	34+1	5	1+2	0
21	MF	(Senegal) SEN	Pathé Ciss	33	1	12+20	1	0+1	0
22	MF	(Spain) ESP	José Ángel Pozo	9	0	1+7	0	0+1	0
23	MF	(Spain) ESP	Óscar Valentín	36	0	29+5	0	2	0
28	MF	(Spain) ESP	Pablo Muñoz	3	0	0+2	0	1	0
29	MF	(Spain) ESP	Diego Méndez	2	1	0+1	0	1	1
Forwards
7	FW	(Spain) ESP	Isi Palazón	40	9	36+1	9	0+3	0
8	FW	(Argentina) ARG	Óscar Trejo	37	3	28+6	3	1+2	0
9	MF	(Colombia) COL	Radamel Falcao	29	2	3+24	2	1+1	0
12	FW	(Spain) ESP	Andrés Martín	10	0	3+6	0	1	0
25	FW	(Spain) ESP	Raúl de Tomás	19	4	9+10	4	0	0
34	FW	(Spain) ESP	Sergio Camello	41	7	27+11	6	2+1	1
Players who transferred out during the season
10	FW	(Cape Verde) CPV	Bebé	6	1	0+4	0	2	1
11	MF	(France) FRA	Randy Nteka	12	0	0+10	0	2	0
