= 2023–24 Rayo Vallecano season =

Rayo Vallecano
2023–24 season
- President: Raúl Martín Presa
- Head coach: Francisco (until 13 February); Iñigo Pérez (from 14 February)
- Stadium: Vallecas
- La Liga: 17th
- Copa del Rey: Round of 16
- Top goalscorer: League: Álvaro García (6); All: Álvaro García (6)
Home colours	Away colours	Third colours

The 2023–24 season was Rayo Vallecano's 100th season in existence and third consecutive season in La Liga. They also competed in the Copa del Rey.

== Players ==
=== First-team squad ===
As of 1 September 2023

Note: Flags indicate national team as defined under FIFA eligibility rules; some limited exceptions apply. Players may hold more than one non-FIFA nationality.

No.	Pos.	Nation	Player
1	GK	MKD	Stole Dimitrievski
2	DF	ROU	Andrei Rațiu
3	DF	ESP	Pep Chavarría
4	DF	ESP	Martín Pascual
5	DF	ESP	Aridane Hernández
6	MF	ESP	José Ángel Pozo
7	MF	ESP	Isi Palazón
8	MF	ARG	Óscar Trejo
9	FW	COL	Radamel Falcao
10	FW	CPV	Bebé
11	FW	FRA	Randy Nteka
12	DF	URU	Alfonso Espino
13	GK	ESP	Dani Cárdenas

No.	Pos.	Nation	Player
14	MF	ESP	Kike Pérez (on loan from Valladolid)
15	MF	POR	Miguel Crespo (on loan from Fenerbahçe)
16	DF	GHA	Abdul Mumin
17	MF	ESP	Unai López
18	MF	ESP	Álvaro García
19	FW	ESP	Jorge de Frutos
20	DF	ALB	Iván Balliu
21	MF	SEN	Pathé Ciss
22	FW	ESP	Raúl de Tomás
23	MF	ESP	Óscar Valentín (captain)
24	DF	FRA	Florian Lejeune
29	MF	ESP	Diego Méndez
34	FW	ESP	Sergio Camello

=== Out on loan ===
Note: Flags indicate national team as defined under FIFA eligibility rules; some limited exceptions apply. Players may hold more than one non-FIFA nationality.

No.	Pos.	Nation	Player
—	GK	ESP	Miguel Ángel Morro (at Villarreal B until 30 June 2024)
—	MF	ESP	Joni Montiel (at Burgos until 30 June 2024)

No.	Pos.	Nation	Player
—	FW	ESP	Andrés Martín (at Racing Santander until 30 June 2024)

== Transfers ==
=== In ===
Pos.	Player	Transferred from	Fee	Date	Source
DF	(Spain) Aridane	Unattached	Free	5 July 2023	
DF	(Uruguay) Alfonso Espino	Unattached	Free	17 July 2023	
DF	(France) Florian Lejeune	(Spain) Alavés	€2,500,000	28 July 2023	
MF	(Spain) Jorge de Frutos	(Spain) Levante	€8,000,000	17 August 2023	
GK	(Spain) Daniel Cárdenas	(Spain) Levante	Undisclosed	18 August 2023	
DF	(Romania) Andrei Rațiu	(Spain) Huesca	€500,000	26 August 2023	
MF	(Spain) Joni Montiel	(Spain) Real Valladolid	Loan return	25 January 2024	
MF	(Portugal) Miguel Crespo	(Turkey) Fenerbahçe	Loan	31 January 2024	

=== Out ===
Pos.	Player	Transferred to	Fee	Date	Source
DF	(Spain) Mario Hernández	Released		1 July 2023	
DF	(Montenegro) Esteban Saveljich	Released		1 July 2023	
DF	(Spain) Mario Suárez	Released		1 July 2023	
MF	(Spain) Santi Comesaña	(Spain) Villarreal	Free	1 July 2023	
DF	(Spain) Alejandro Catena	(Spain) Osasuna	Free	1 July 2023	
DF	(Spain) Fran García	(Spain) Real Madrid	€5,000,000	1 July 2023	

== Pre-season and friendlies ==
Win Draw Loss Fixtures

18 July 2023 Friendly	Panathinaikos	0–1	Rayo Vallecano	Athens
21:00 UTC+3		Report	Álvaro 57'	Stadium: Leoforos Alexandras Stadium

22 July 2023 Friendly	Charleroi	1–1	Rayo Vallecano	Charleroi
19:00 UTC+2	Ilaimaharitra 32' (pen.), (yellow card) 80'		García 6'; Aridane (yellow card) 58'; Montiel (yellow card) 81'; Chavarría (yellow card) 90'	Stadium: Stade du Pays de Charleroi

29 July 2023 Friendly	Porto	1–1	Rayo Vallecano	Porto
21:30 UTC+2	Taremi (penalty missed); (yellow card) 86'; Loader 90+8'		(yellow card) 28'; (yellow card) 30'; (yellow card) 71'; (yellow card) 79'; García 82'; (yellow card) 86'

2 August 2023 Friendly	Valladolid	3–2	Rayo Vallecano	Valladolid
20:30 UTC+2	Bikoue 10', 22', 33'; Rofino (yellow card) 56'; (yellow card) 90'		García 70', 90+3'; (yellow card) 90+2'	Stadium: Estadio José Zorrilla

6 August 2023 Friendly	Brighton & Hove Albion	1–1	Rayo Vallecano	Falmer
15:00 UTC+1	(yellow card) 50'; João Pedro 66' (pen.); (yellow card) 87'		García 14'; (yellow card) 33'; Trejo (yellow card) 36'; López (yellow card) 50'	Stadium: Falmer Stadium; Attendance: 10,563; Referee: Peter Bankes

7 September 2023 Trofeo Puchero-Siena	Alcorcón	2–2 (1–4 p)	Rayo Vallecano	Alcorcón
20:30 UTC+2	Bustos 37'; Borrego 84'	Report	De Frutos 9'; Pozo 35'	Stadium: Santo Domingo

== Competitions ==
=== Overall record ===
Competition	First match	Last match	Starting round	Final position	Record							
Competition	First match	Last match	Starting round	Final position	Pld	W	D	L	GF	GA	GD	Win %
La Liga	11 August 2023	25 May 2024	Matchday 1	17th	38	8	14	16	29	48	−19	21.05
Copa del Rey	1 November 2023	17 January 2024	First round	Round of 16	4	3	0	1	11	3	+8	75.00
Total					42	11	14	17	40	51	−11	26.19

Source: Soccerway

=== La Liga ===
==== League table ====
Pos	Team	Pld	W	D	L	GF	GA	GD	Pts	Qualification or relegation
15	Mallorca	38	8	16	14	33	44	−11	40 (Note: Mallorca finished ahead of Las Palmas on head-to-head points: Las Palmas 1–1 Mallorca, Mallorca 1–0 Las Palmas.)	
16	Las Palmas	38	10	10	18	33	47	−14	40	
17	Rayo Vallecano	38	8	14	16	29	48	−19	38	
18	Cádiz (R)	38	6	15	17	26	55	−29	33	Relegation to Segunda División
19	Almería (R)	38	3	12	23	43	75	−32	21 (Note: Tied on head-to-head points. Almería finished ahead of Granada on overall goal difference.)	Relegation to Segunda División

Source: LaLiga EA Sports
Rules for classification: 1) Points; 2) Head-to-head points; 3) Head-to-head goal difference; 4) Goal difference; 5) Goals scored; 6) Fair-play points
(Note: Head-to-head record is used only after all the matches between the teams in question have been played)
(R) Relegation

==== Results summary ====
Overall								Home						Away					
Pld	W	D	L	GF	GA	GD	Pts	W	D	L	GF	GA	GD	W	D	L	GF	GA	GD
38	8	14	16	29	48	−19	38	4	7	6	18	24	−6	4	7	10	11	24	−13

Source: La Liga

==== Results by round ====
Round	1	2	3	4	5	6	7	8	9	10	11	12	13	14	15	16	17	18	19	20	21	22	23	24	25	26	27	28	29	30	31	32	33	34	35	36	37	38
Ground	A	A	H	A	H	H	A	H	A	A	H	A	H	H	A	H	A	H	A	A	H	A	H	A	H	A	H	A	H	A	H	H	A	H	A	H	A	H
Result	W	W	L	L	W	D	D	D	D	W	D	D	L	D	L	D	L	L	W	L	L	D	L	L	D	L	D	L	W	D	D	W	L	L	D	W	L	L
Position	4	2	8	12	6	7	7	8	7	7	8	9	10	10	11	10	11	11	11	11	13	13	13	14	14	14	16	16	15	16	16	15	15	16	16	15	16	17

Source: La Liga
A = Away; H = Home; W = Win; D = Draw; L = Loss

==== Matches ====
The league fixtures were unveiled on 22 June 2023.

11 August 2023 1	Almería	0–2	Rayo Vallecano	Almería
19:30 CEST (UTC+2)	Ramazani (yellow card) 65'	Report	Palazón 20' (pen.); Nteka 28' (pen.); López (yellow card) 40'; García (yellow card) 40'; Valentín (yellow card) 65'	Stadium: Power Horse Stadium; Attendance: 14,837; Referee: Javier Alberola Rojas

21 August 2023 2	Granada	0–2	Rayo Vallecano	Granada
21:30 CEST (UTC+2)	Sánchez (yellow card) 11'; Gumbau (yellow card) 50'; Puertas (red card) 86'	Report	Hernández (yellow card) 50'; García 75'; Ciss 79'	Stadium: Nuevo Los Cármenes; Attendance: 17,338; Referee: Pablo González Fuertes

28 August 2023 3	Rayo Vallecano	0–7	Atlético Madrid	Madrid
21:30 CEST (UTC+2)	Palazón (yellow card) 39'; Lejeune (yellow card) 64'; Espino (yellow card) 81'; Balliu (yellow card) 88'	Report	Griezmann 2', (yellow card) 75'; Depay 16'; Molina 36'; Barrios (yellow card) 49'; Morata 73', 84'; Correa 79'; Llorente 86'; Hermoso (yellow card) 87'	Stadium: Campo de Fútbol de Vallecas; Attendance: 13,966; Referee: José Luis Munuera Montero

2 September 2023 4	Real Betis	1–0	Rayo Vallecano	Seville
21:00 CEST (UTC+2)	Miranda (yellow card) 15'; Rodríguez (yellow card) 43'; Willian José 53'; Roca (yellow card) 85'	Report	García (yellow card) 45'; Espino (yellow card) 55'; De Tomás (yellow card) 58'; Palazón (yellow card) 58'; Pérez (yellow card) 86'	Stadium: Benito Villamarín; Attendance: 50,169; Referee: Alejandro Muñiz Ruiz

15 September 2023 5	Rayo Vallecano	2–0	Alavés	Madrid
21:00 CEST (UTC+2)	Aridane (yellow card) 19'; Palazón 43'; De Frutos 82'; De Tomás (yellow card) 90+5'	Report	Duarte (yellow card) 23'; Sola (yellow card) 41'; Hagi (yellow card) 90+5'	Stadium: Campo de Fútbol de Vallecas; Attendance: 12,116; Referee: Víctor García Verdura

24 September 2023 6	Rayo Vallecano	1–1	Villarreal	Madrid
16:15 CEST (UTC+2)	Pérez 16'; García (yellow card) 18'; Camello (yellow card) 63'	Report	Sørloth 15'; Moreno (yellow card) 62' (yellow-red card) 77'; Comesaña (yellow card) 73'	Stadium: Campo de Fútbol de Vallecas; Attendance: 12,865; Referee: Jorge Figueroa Vázquez

27 September 2023 7	Cádiz	0–0	Rayo Vallecano	Cádiz
21:30 CEST (UTC+2)	Gómez (yellow card) 5'; J. Hernández (yellow card) 45+4'; Alejo (yellow card) 51'; L. Hernández (yellow card) 59'; Alcaraz (yellow card) 73'	Report	Trejo (yellow card) 43'; Chavarría (yellow card) 43'; Espino (yellow card) 44'; Ciss (yellow card) 68'; Lejeune (yellow card) 82'; Mumin (yellow card) 88' (yellow-red card) 88'	Stadium: Nuevo Mirandilla; Attendance: 18,505; Referee: José Hernández Maeso

30 September 2023 8	Rayo Vallecano	2–2	Mallorca	Madrid
16:15 CEST (UTC+2)	García 4'; López (yellow card) 43'; De Tomás (yellow card) 90+4'; Falcao 90+12' (pen.)	Report	Muriqi 44'; Sánchez 59'; Darder (yellow card) 83'; J. Costa (yellow card) 90+2'; González (yellow card) 90+4'; Amath (yellow card) 90+6'; Mascarell (yellow card) 90+10'	Stadium: Campo de Fútbol de Vallecas; Attendance: 11,991; Referee: Mario Melero López

7 October 2023 9	Sevilla	2–2	Rayo Vallecano	Seville
21:00 CEST (UTC+2)	Gudelj (yellow card) 36'; Sow (yellow card) 45+3', (goal) 50'; Suso (yellow card) 67'; Navas (yellow card) 84'; En-Nesyri 90+6'; Jordán (yellow card) 90+7'	Report	Valentín 21'; García 26'; Hernández (yellow card) 74'; Juanlu (yellow card) 50'; Pérez (yellow card) 84'	Stadium: Ramón Sánchez Pizjuán; Attendance: 35,817; Referee: Isidro Díaz de Mera Escuderos

21 October 2023 10	Las Palmas	0–1	Rayo Vallecano	Las Palmas
14:00 CEST (UTC+2)	Coco (yellow card) 20'; Munir (penalty missed) 34'; Muñoz (yellow card) 77'; Suárez (yellow card) 90+1'; Perrone (yellow card) 90+5'	Report	Camello (yellow card) 79'; Valentín (yellow card) 86' (yellow-red card) 90+4'; Bebé 90+2' (pen.)	Stadium: Estadio Gran Canaria; Attendance: 24,548; Referee: Javier Iglesias Villanueva

29 October 2023 11	Rayo Vallecano	2–2	Real Sociedad	Madrid
16:15 CET (UTC+1)	Lejeune (yellow card) 13'; Mumin 31'; García (yellow card) 66'; Bebé 90+1', (yellow card) 90+2'	Report	Oyarzabal 41', 66' (pen.); Turrientes (yellow card) 72'; Zubeldia (yellow card) 74'	Stadium: Campo de Fútbol de Vallecas; Attendance: 12,970; Referee: Mateo Busquets Ferrer

5 November 2023 12	Real Madrid	0–0	Rayo Vallecano	Madrid
21:00 CET (UTC+1)	Camavinga (yellow card) 62'; Vinícius (yellow card) 74'; Rüdiger (yellow card) 90+6'	Report	Rațiu (yellow card) 45'; Cisse (yellow card) 57'; Trejo (yellow card) 88'; Dimitrievski (yellow card) 90+1'; Lejeune (yellow card) 90+6'	Stadium: Santiago Bernabéu; Attendance: 70,220; Referee: Juan Martínez Munuera

11 November 2023 13	Rayo Vallecano	1–2	Girona	Madrid
14:00 CET (UTC+1)	García 5', (yellow card) 44'	Report	Gutiérrez (yellow card) 14'; Dovbyk 42'; Sávio 65'; Martín (yellow card) 73'	Stadium: Campo de Fútbol de Vallecas; Attendance: 13,177; Referee: Pablo González Fuertes

25 November 2023 14	Rayo Vallecano	1–1	Barcelona	Madrid
14:00 CET (UTC+1)	López 39', (yellow card) 70'; Espino (yellow card) 64'; Falcao (yellow card) 90'	Report	Pedri (yellow card) 31'; Romeu (yellow card) 51'; Lejeune 82' (o.g.); Félix (yellow card) 90+3'; De Jong (yellow card) 90+4'	Stadium: Campo de Fútbol de Vallecas; Attendance: 14,148; Referee: José Luis Munuera Montero

2 December 2023 15	Athletic Bilbao	4–0	Rayo Vallecano	Bilbao
16:15 CET (UTC+1)	Vivian (yellow card) 6'; Guruzeta 23'; Espino 47' (o.g.); I. Williams 64'; N. Williams 68'	Report	Espino (yellow card) 32'; Falcao (yellow card) 87'	Stadium: San Mamés; Attendance: 44,689; Referee: José Hernández Maeso

11 December 2023 16	Rayo Vallecano	0–0	Celta Vigo	Madrid
21:00 CET (UTC+1)	Valentín (yellow card) 68'; López (yellow card) 73'; Ciss (yellow card) 83'	Report		Stadium: Campo de Fútbol de Vallecas; Attendance: 11,796; Referee: Víctor García Verdura

15 December 2023 17	Osasuna	1–0	Rayo Vallecano	Pamplona
21:00 CET (UTC+1)	Arnáiz (yellow card) 74'; Ra. García 90+5', (yellow card) 90+6'	Report	Espino (yellow card) 40'; Ciss (yellow card) 55'; Pérez (yellow card) 55'	Stadium: El Sadar; Attendance: 18,586; Referee: Javier Iglesias Villanueva

19 December 2023 18	Rayo Vallecano	0–1	Valencia	Madrid
19:00 CET (UTC+1)	Pérez (yellow card) 70'; Nteka (yellow card) 90+5'	Report	González (yellow card) 34'; Vázquez (yellow card) 50'; Canós 61'; Amallah (yellow card) 75'; Pérez (yellow card) 81'; Correia (red card) 90+1'; Diakhaby (yellow card) 90+5'	Stadium: Campo de Fútbol de Vallecas; Attendance: 12,290; Referee: Javier Alberola Rojas

2 January 2024 19	Getafe	0–2	Rayo Vallecano	Getafe
17:00 CET (UTC+1)	Djené (yellow card) 19'; Latasa (yellow card) 23' (yellow-red card) 40'; Greenwood (red card) 50'; Mata (yellow card) 54'; Suárez (yellow card) 69', (red card) 70'; Alderete (yellow card) 82'	Report	Espino (yellow card) 4'; Pérez (yellow card) 39'; Camello 45+1', 47'; Ciss (yellow card) 90'	Stadium: Coliseum; Attendance: 11,204; Referee: Jorge Figueroa Vázquez
Note: Suárez was sent off after being substituted out of the match.

20 January 2024 21	Rayo Vallecano	0–2	Las Palmas	Madrid
14:00 CET (UTC+1)	Balliu (yellow card) 17'; Palazón (yellow card) 69'; García (yellow card) 76' (yellow-red card) 81'	Report	Moleiro 35'; Valles (yellow card) 80'; Muñoz 83'	Stadium: Campo de Fútbol de Vallecas; Attendance: 12,477; Referee: Mario Melero López

27 January 2024 22	Real Sociedad	0–0	Rayo Vallecano	San Sebastián
14:00 CET (UTC+1)	Galán (yellow card) 70'; Pacheco (yellow card) 90+4'	Report	Trejo (yellow card) 7'; Balliu (yellow card) 19'; López (yellow card) 57'; Nteka (yellow card) 85'	Stadium: Reale Arena; Attendance: 32,528; Referee: Alejandro Hernández Hernández

31 January 2024 20	Atlético Madrid	2–1	Rayo Vallecano	Madrid
21:00 CET (UTC+1)	Mandava 35'; Depay 90'	Report	Pérez (yellow card) 35'; García 42'; Palazón (yellow card) 60'; Chavarría (yellow card) 90+7'	Stadium: Cívitas Metropolitano; Attendance: 47,003; Referee: César Soto Grado
Note: The match date was pushed back due to Atlético Madrid's involvement in the Supercopa de España.

5 February 2024 23	Rayo Vallecano	1–2	Sevilla	Madrid
21:00 CET (UTC+1)	Palazón 29'; Crespo (yellow card) 90+2'; Dimitrievski (yellow card) 90+7'	Report	En-Nesyri 19', 45'; Romero (yellow card) 36'; Acuña (yellow card) 45+5'; Mejbri (yellow card) 85'	Stadium: Campo de Fútbol de Vallecas; Attendance: 12,546; Referee: Francisco José Hernández Maeso

11 February 2024 24	Mallorca	2–1	Rayo Vallecano	Palma
16:15 CET (UTC+1)	Nastasić (yellow card) 1'; Muriqi (yellow card) 39', (goal) 90+1'; Rodríguez (yellow card) 41'; Sánchez 48'; Abdón (yellow card) 90+5'	Report	García 76'	Stadium: Estadi Mallorca Son Moix; Attendance: 16,735; Referee: José Luis Munuera Montero

18 February 2024 25	Rayo Vallecano	1–1	Real Madrid	Madrid
14:00 CET (UTC+1)	De Tomás 27' (pen.), (yellow card) 81'; Palazón (yellow card) 45+1'; Balliu (yellow card) 45+4'; Á. García (yellow card) 82'	Report	Joselu 3'; Camavinga (yellow card) 61'; Carvajal (yellow card) 90+3' (yellow-red card) 90+5'	Stadium: Campo de Fútbol de Vallecas; Attendance: 14,354; Referee: Alejandro Muñiz Ruiz

26 February 2024 26	Girona	3–0	Rayo Vallecano	Girona
21:00 CET (UTC+1)	Tsyhankov 52'; A. García (yellow card) 54'; Couto (yellow card) 85'; Sávio 90+1', 90+5', (yellow card) 90+1'	Report	Ciss (yellow card) 65'; Crespo (yellow card) 73'; Chavarría (yellow card) 75' (yellow-red card) 76'; Pérez (yellow card) 81'	Stadium: Montilivi; Attendance: 8,923; Referee: Ricardo de Burgos Bengoetxea

2 March 2024 27	Rayo Vallecano	1–1	Cádiz	Madrid
16:15 CET (UTC+1)	Crespo (yellow card) 43'; Lejeune 78'	Report	Alejo (yellow card) 83'; J. Hernández 90+1'	Stadium: Campo de Fútbol de Vallecas; Attendance: 12,272; Referee: Javier Alberola Rojas

10 March 2024 28	Alavés	1–0	Rayo Vallecano	Vitoria-Gasteiz
15:00 CET (UTC+1)	Abqar (yellow card) 28'; Gorosabel 44'; Blanco (yellow card) 90+7'	Report	Palazón (yellow card) 13'; Espino (yellow card) 30'	Stadium: Mendizorrotza Stadium; Attendance: 16,519; Referee: José Luis Munuera Montero

17 March 2024 29	Rayo Vallecano	2–0	Real Betis	Madrid
18:30 CET (UTC+1)	De Tomás (yellow card) 28'; Lejeune 40', (yellow card) 86'; Mumin (yellow card) 45+2'; Camello 78'; Ciss (yellow card) 90+8'	Report	Pérez (yellow card) 29'; Pezzella (yellow card) 38'; Isco (yellow card) 83'; Carvalho (yellow card) 90+4'	Stadium: Campo de Fútbol de Vallecas; Attendance: 13,264; Referee: Juan Luis Pulido Santana

31 March 2024 30	Celta Vigo	0–0	Rayo Vallecano	Vigo
14:00 CEST (UTC+2)	Aspas (yellow card) 70'; Domínguez (yellow card) 84'; Pérez (yellow card) 89'	Report	Chavarría (yellow card) 3'; Ciss (yellow card) 44'; Pezzella (yellow card) 72'	Stadium: Balaídos; Attendance: 21,505; Referee: Alejandro Hernández Hernández

13 April 2024 31	Rayo Vallecano	0–0	Getafe	Madrid
16:15 CEST (UTC+2)	Camello (yellow card) 7'; Palazón (yellow card) 16'; Mumin (yellow card) 80'; Valentín (yellow card) 90+2'	Report	Iglesias (yellow card) 17'; Mata (yellow card) 39'; Álvarez (yellow card) 51'; Latasa (yellow card) 80'; Moriba (yellow card) 81'; Rodríguez (yellow card) 85'	Stadium: Campo de Fútbol de Vallecas; Attendance: 12,868; Referee: Jorge Figueroa Vázquez

20 April 2024 32	Rayo Vallecano	2–1	Osasuna	Madrid
16:15 CEST (UTC+2)	Valentín (yellow card) 45'; Ciss (yellow card) 51'; Chavarría 80'; Palazón 84', (yellow card) 86'; López (yellow card) 90+4'	Report	Gómez 29'; Muñoz (yellow card) 48'	Stadium: Campo de Fútbol de Vallecas; Attendance: 12,617; Referee: Mario Melero López

28 April 2024 33	Villarreal	3–0	Rayo Vallecano	Villarreal
18:30 CEST (UTC+2)	Sørloth 18', 74'; Mosquera 69'; Coquelin (yellow card) 77'; Albiol (yellow card) 90'	Report	Ciss (yellow card) 78'	Stadium: Estadio de la Cerámica; Attendance: 17,869; Referee: Pablo González Fuertes

5 May 2024 34	Rayo Vallecano	0–1	Almería	Madrid
21:00 CEST (UTC+2)	Falcao (yellow card) 26'; Mumin (yellow card) 82'; Trejo (yellow card) 90+1'	Report	Lozano 30'; Peña (yellow card) 79'; Montes (yellow card) 90+4'	Stadium: Campo de Fútbol de Vallecas; Attendance: 10,864; Referee: Francisco José Hernández Maeso

12 May 2024 35	Valencia	0–0	Rayo Vallecano	Valencia
18:30 CEST (UTC+2)	Correia (yellow card) 58'	Report	De Frutos (yellow card) 32'; Chavarría (yellow card) 90+4'	Stadium: Mestalla; Attendance: 42,642; Referee: Juan Luis Pulido Santana

15 May 2024 36	Rayo Vallecano	2–1	Granada	Madrid
19:30 CEST (UTC+2)	Trejo (red card) 5'; Lejeune 23'; López (yellow card) 31'; Espino (yellow card) 57'; De Frutos 80'; Nteka (yellow card) 90+2'; Falcao (yellow card) 90+5'	Report	Corbeanu (yellow card) 42'; Callejón (yellow card) 83'; Boyé 89'; Neva (yellow card) 90'	Stadium: Campo de Fútbol de Vallecas; Attendance: 12,738; Referee: Isidro Díaz de Mera Escuderos

19 May 2024 37	Barcelona	3–0	Rayo Vallecano	Barcelona
19:00 CEST (UTC+2)	Lewandowski 3'; Yamal (yellow card) 10'; Raphinha (yellow card) 31'; Cubarsí (yellow card) 37'; Pedri 72', 75'; Cancelo (yellow card) 90+2'	Report	Mumin (yellow card) 23'; Valentín (yellow card) 50'	Stadium: Estadi Olímpic Lluís Companys; Attendance: 35,823; Referee: Jesús Gil Manzano

25 May 2024 38	Rayo Vallecano	0–1	Athletic Bilbao	Madrid
18:30 CEST (UTC+2)	Crespo (yellow card) 84'	Report	Ruiz de Galarreta (yellow card) 44'; N. Williams 67'	Stadium: Campo de Fútbol de Vallecas; Attendance: 13,090; Referee: José Luis Munuera Montero

=== Copa del Rey ===
1 November 2023 First round	Atlético Lugones	0–6	Rayo Vallecano	Lugones
12:00 CET (UTC+1)	Deco (yellow card) 7'; J. Fernández (yellow card) 45'; Basualdo (yellow card) 69'	Report	Falcao 8' (pen.), 16'; Camello 40'; Bebé 62', 79'; Rațiu 68'; Nteka (penalty missed) 81'	Stadium: Santa Bárbara; Attendance: 1,800; Referee: Alejandro Muñiz Ruiz

6 December 2023 Second round	Yeclano	0–2	Rayo Vallecano	Yecla
12:00 CET (UTC+1)	Silvente (yellow card) 32'; Uri (yellow card) 90+1'	Report	Bebé (yellow card) 32'; Nteka (yellow card) 53'; Pascual (yellow card) 74'; Falcao 89'; De Tomás 90+4'	Stadium: La Constitución; Attendance: 4,700; Referee: Mario Melero López

6 January 2024 Round of 32	Huesca	0–2 (a.e.t.)	Rayo Vallecano	Huesca
19:00 CET (UTC+1)	Rico (yellow card) 117'; Nieto (yellow card) 120+3'	Report	Falcao (yellow card) 76'; Valentín (yellow card) 88', (goal) 118'; Palazón 120+2'	Stadium: El Alcoraz; Attendance: 2,629; Referee: César Soto Grado

17 January 2024 Round of 16	Girona	3–1	Rayo Vallecano	Girona
21:30 CET (UTC+1)	Stuani 15', 19' (pen.), (yellow card) 45+2'; Blind 26'	Report	Nteka 36', (yellow card) 45+2'	Stadium: Montilivi; Attendance: 7,911; Referee: Jorge Figueroa Vázquez

== Statistics ==
=== Appearances and goals ===
Last updated on 7 October 2023.

No.	Pos	Nat	Player	Total		La Liga		Copa del Rey	
No.	Pos	Nat	Player	Apps	Goals	Apps	Goals	Apps	Goals
Goalkeepers
1	GK	(North Macedonia) MKD	Stole Dimitrievski	9	0	9	0	0	0
13	GK	(Spain) ESP	Daniel Cárdenas	0	0	0	0	0	0
Defenders
2	DF	(Romania) ROU	Andrei Rațiu	0	0	0	0	0	0
3	DF	(Spain) ESP	Pep Chavarría	3	0	0+3	0	0	0
4	DF	(Spain) ESP	Martín Pascual	0	0	0	0	0	0
5	DF	(Spain) ESP	Aridane Hernández	8	0	8	0	0	0
12	DF	(Uruguay) URU	Alfonso Espino	9	0	9	0	0	0
16	DF	(Ghana) GHA	Abdul Mumin	2	0	1+1	0	0	0
20	DF	(Albania) ALB	Iván Balliu	9	0	9	0	0	0
24	DF	(France) FRA	Florian Lejeune	9	0	9	0	0	0
Midfielders
6	MF	(Spain) ESP	José Ángel Pozo	0	0	0	0	0	0
11	MF	(France) FRA	Randy Nteka	4	1	3+1	1	0	0
14	MF	(Spain) ESP	Kike Pérez	6	1	3+3	1	0	0
17	MF	(Spain) ESP	Unai López	7	0	6+1	0	0	0
18	MF	(Spain) ESP	Álvaro García	9	3	9	3	0	0
19	MF	(Spain) ESP	Jorge de Frutos	8	1	1+7	1	0	0
21	MF	(Senegal) SEN	Pathé Ciss	9	1	4+5	1	0	0
23	MF	(Spain) ESP	Óscar Valentín	9	1	8+1	1	0	0
29	MF	(Spain) ESP	Diego Méndez	1	0	0+1	0	0	0
Forwards
7	FW	(Spain) ESP	Isi Palazón	9	2	8+1	2	0	0
8	FW	(Argentina) ARG	Óscar Trejo	8	0	3+5	0	0	0
9	MF	(Colombia) COL	Radamel Falcao	3	1	0+3	1	0	0
10	MF	(Cape Verde) CPV	Bebé	5	0	0+5	0	0	0
22	FW	(Spain) ESP	Raúl de Tomás	8	0	4+4	0	0	0
34	FW	(Spain) ESP	Sergio Camello	7	0	3+4	0	0	0
Players who have made an appearance this season but have left the club
