= 2025–26 Rayo Vallecano season =

Spanish football club season

Rayo Vallecano
2025–26 season
- President: Raúl Martín Presa
- Head coach: Iñigo Pérez
- Stadium: Vallecas
- La Liga: 8th
- Copa del Rey: Round of 16
- UEFA Conference League: Runners-up
- Top goalscorer: League: Jorge de Frutos (10); All: Jorge de Frutos; Álvaro García (12 each)
- Highest home attendance: 14,468 vs Real Madrid
- Lowest home attendance: 8,842 vs Shkëndija
- Average home league attendance: 12,372
Home colours	Away colours	Third colours

The 2025–26 season was the 102nd season in the history of Rayo Vallecano, and the club's fifth consecutive season in La Liga. In addition to the domestic league, the club participated in the Copa del Rey and the UEFA Conference League, reaching the final of the latter competition. The season covered the period from 1 July 2025 to 30 June 2026.

== Summary ==
Rayo Vallecano reached the final of the 2025–26 UEFA Conference League.

== Players ==
=== First team ===
As of 4 September 2025

No.	Pos.	Nat.	Player	Date of birth (age)	Signed from	Transfer fee	Apps.	Goals	Since
Goalkeepers
1	GK	(Spain)	Dani Cárdenas	28 March 1997 (age 29)	Levante	€1.3M	15	0	2023
13	GK	(Argentina)	Augusto Batalla	30 April 1996 (age 30)	(Argentina) River Plate	€1.6M	37	0	2025
Defenders
2	DF	(Romania)	Andrei Rațiu	20 June 1998 (age 28)	Huesca	€5.5M	56	3	2023
3	DF	(Spain)	Pep Chavarría	10 April 1998 (age 28)	Real Zaragoza	€1.8M	70	0	2022
5	DF	(Italy)	Luiz Felipe	22 March 1997 (age 29)	(France) Marseille	Free	3	0	2025
16	DF	(Ghana)	Abdul Mumin	6 June 1998 (age 28)	(Portugal) Vitória de Guimarães	€1.5M	64	3	2022
20	DF	(Albania)	Iván Balliu	1 January 1992 (age 34)	Almería	Free	141	1	2021
22	DF	(Uruguay)	Pacha Espino	5 January 1992 (age 34)	Cádiz	Free	167	5	2023
24	DF	(France)	Florian Lejeune	20 May 1991 (age 35)	Alavés	€2.5M	113	9	2023
Midfielders
4	MF	(Spain)	Pedro Díaz	5 June 1998 (age 28)	(France) Bordeaux	Free	33	4	2024
6	MF	(Senegal)	Pathé Ciss	16 March 1994 (age 32)	Fuenlabrada	€1M	139	9	2021
7	MF	(Spain)	Isi Palazón (3rd captain)	27 December 1994 (age 31)	Ponferradina	€600K	224	32	2020
8	MF	(Argentina)	Óscar Trejo (captain)	26 April 1988 (age 38)	(France) Toulouse	Free	321	44	2017
15	MF	(Spain)	Gerard Gumbau	18 December 1994 (age 31)	Granada	Loan	30	0	2025
17	MF	(Spain)	Unai López	30 October 1995 (age 31)	Athletic Bilbao	Free	183	8	2021
18	MF	(Spain)	Álvaro García	27 October 1992 (age 34)	Cádiz	€4.5M	272	40	2018
23	MF	(Spain)	Óscar Valentín (vice-captain)	20 August 1994 (age 32)	Rayo Majadahonda	Free	227	4	2019
Forwards
9	FW	(Brazil)	Alemão	1 January 1998 (age 28)	(Mexico) Pachuca	€4.5M	0	0	2025
10	FW	(Spain)	Sergio Camello	10 February 2001 (age 25)	Atlético Madrid	€5M	102	15	2023
11	FW	(Angola)	Randy Nteka	6 December 1997 (age 28)	Fuenlabrada	€1.3M	103	8	2021
19	FW	(Spain)	Jorge de Frutos	20 February 1997 (age 29)	Levante	€8M	102	14	2023
21	FW	(Spain)	Fran Pérez	9 September 2002 (age 24)	Valencia	€1M	4	1	2025

=== Reserve team ===
Note: Flags indicate national team as defined under FIFA eligibility rules; some limited exceptions apply. Players may hold more than one non-FIFA nationality.

No.	Pos.	Nation	Player
26	DF	ESP	Marco de las Sías
28	MF	ESP	Samu Becerra
29	DF	ESP	Diego Méndez
30	GK	ESP	Juanpe
32	DF	SEN	Nobel Mendy (on loan from Real Betis)

No.	Pos.	Nation	Player
33	DF	NED	Jozhua Vertrouwd
40	GK	ESP	Adrián Molina
—	DF	ESP	Sergio Lozano
—	FW	ESP	Iván Alonso

== Transfers ==
=== In ===
Pos.	Player	Transferred from	Fee	Date	Source
Summer
GK	(Argentina) Augusto Batalla	(Argentina) River Plate	Transfer	1 July 2025	
GK	(Spain) Miguel Morro	(Portugal) Vizela	Loan return	1 July 2025	
DF	(Italy) Luiz Felipe	(France) Marseille	Free transfer	7 July 2025	
MF	(Spain) Gerard Gumbau	Granada	Loan	16 July 2025	
DF	(Romania) Andrei Rațiu	Villarreal	Transfer (Note: Rayo Vallecano purchased 50% remaining player rights.)	7 August 2024	
DF	(Netherlands) Jozhua Vertrouwd	Castellón	Transfer	12 August 2025	
MF	(Spain) Fran Pérez	Valencia	Transfer	15 August 2025	
DF	(Senegal) Nobel Mendy	Real Betis	Loan	20 August 2025	
FW	(Brazil) Alemão	(Mexico) Pachuca	Transfer	1 September 2025	
Winter

=== Out ===
Pos.	Player	Transferred to	Fee	Date	Source
Summer
GK	(Argentina) Augusto Batalla	(Argentina) River Plate	Loan return	30 June 2025	
MF	(Spain) Joni Montiel	(Azerbaijan) Qarabağ	Free transfer	30 June 2025	
FW	(Spain) Sergi Guardiola	Córdoba	Free transfer	30 June 2025	
DF	(Spain) Aridane Hernández	Almería	End of contract	30 June 2025	
GK	(Spain) Miguel Morro	(Portugal) Leixões	Loan	14 July 2025	
FW	(Spain) Raúl de Tomás	(Qatar) Al-Wakrah	Loan	20 July 2025	
FW	(Cameroon) Etienne Eto'o	Mirandés	Loan	1 September 2025	
DF	(Spain) Pelayo Fernández	Cádiz	Loan	1 September 2025	
Winter

== Pre-season and friendlies ==
Date	Opponents	H / A	Result F–A	Scorers	Attendance
19 July 2025	Genk	A	1–1	García 80'	
26 July 2025	Zwolle	A	5–0	Trejo 11', Nteka 23', De Frutos 31', Díaz 46', Eto'o 73'	3,850
2 August 2025	West Bromwich Albion	A	2–3	De Frutos 20', Gumbau 84'	
6 August 2025	Atlético Madrid	N	1–1	De Frutos 8'	
10 August 2025	Sunderland	A	3–0	De Frutos 18', Pacha Espino 47', Isi 59'	

== Competitions ==
=== Overall record ===
Competition	First match	Last match	Starting round	Final position	Record							
Competition	First match	Last match	Starting round	Final position	Pld	W	D	L	GF	GA	GD	Win %
La Liga	15 August 2025	23 May 2026	Matchday 1	8th	38	12	14	12	41	44	−3	31.58
Copa del Rey	29 October 2025	14 January 2026	First round	Round of 16	4	3	0	1	11	5	+6	75.00
UEFA Conference League	21 August 2025	27 May 2026	Play-off round	Runners-up	15	10	1	4	27	13	+14	66.67
Total					57	25	15	17	79	62	+17	43.86

Source: Rayo Vallecano

=== La Liga ===
==== League table ====
Pos	Team	Pld	W	D	L	GF	GA	GD	Pts	Qualification or relegation
6	Celta Vigo	38	14	12	12	53	48	+5	54	Qualification for the Europa League league phase
7	Getafe	38	15	6	17	32	38	−6	51	Qualification for the Conference League play-off round
8	Rayo Vallecano	38	12	14	12	41	44	−3	50	
9	Valencia	38	13	10	15	46	55	−9	49	
10	Real Sociedad	38	11	13	14	59	61	−2	46 (Note: Tied on head-to-head points and goal difference. Real Sociedad placed ahead of Espanyol on overall goal difference.)	Qualification for the Europa League league phase (Note: Real Sociedad qualified for the Europa League league phase as the 2025–26 Copa del Rey winners.)

Source: LaLiga EA Sports
Rules for classification: 1) Points; 2) Head-to-head points; 3) Head-to-head goal difference; 4) Goal difference; 5) Goals scored; 6) Fair-play points
(Note: Head-to-head record is used only after all the matches between the teams in question have been played)

==== Results summary ====
Overall								Home						Away					
Pld	W	D	L	GF	GA	GD	Pts	W	D	L	GF	GA	GD	W	D	L	GF	GA	GD
38	12	14	12	41	44	−3	50	7	10	2	24	15	+9	5	4	10	17	29	−12

Source: La Liga

==== Results by round ====
Round	1	2	3	4	5	6	7	8	9	10	11	12	13	14	15	16	17	18	19	20	21	22	23	24	25	26	27	28	29	30	31	32	33	34	35	36	37	38
Ground	A	A	H	A	H	A	H	A	A	H	A	H	A	H																								
Result	W	L	D	L	D	L	L	W	W	W	L	D	D	D	L	D	L																					
Position	3	8	10	13	14	14	16	14	11	7	10	12	13	9																								
Points	3	3	4	4	5	5	5	8	11	14	14	15	16	17	17	18	18																					

Updated to match(es) played on 4 December 2025. Source: Rayo Vallecano
A = Away; H = Home; W = Win; D = Draw; L = Loss

==== Matches ====
Kickoff times are in CET.

Win Draw Loss

Round	Date	Time	Opponents	H / A	Result F–A	Scorers	Attendance	Referee
1	15 August 2025	19:00	Girona	A	3–1	De Frutos 18', García 20', Isi 45' (pen.)	12,403	Javier Alberola Rojas
2	25 August 2025	19:30	Athletic Bilbao	A	0–1		48,073	Juan Martínez Munuera
3	31 August 2025	21:30	Barcelona	H	1–1	Pérez 67'	14,438	Mateo Busquets Ferrer
4	14 September 2025	18:30	Osasuna	A	0–2		20,511	César Soto Grado
5	21 September 2025	14:00	Celta Vigo	H	1–1	De Frutos 65'	13,028	Víctor García Verdura
6	24 September 2025	21:30	Atlético Madrid	A	2–3	Pep Chavarría 46', García 77'	54,098	Alejandro Hernández Hernández
7	28 September 2025	14:00	Sevilla	H	0–1		13,080	Jesús Gil Manzano
8	5 October 2025	18:30	Real Sociedad	A	1–0	Pacha Espino 84'	31,189	José Luis Guzmán Mansilla
9	19 October 2025	18:30	Levante	A	3–0	De Frutos (2) 12', 25', García 65'	20,312	Miguel Sesma Espinosa
10	26 October 2025	21:00	Alavés	H	1–0	Alemão 90+1'	11,734	Víctor García Verdura
11	1 November 2025	14:00	Villarreal	A	0–4		17,022	Iosu Galech Apezteguía
12	9 November 2025	16:15	Real Madrid	H	0–0		14,468	Juan Martínez Munuera
13	23 November 2025	14:00	Real Oviedo	A	0–0		23,684	Alejandro Quintero González
14	1 December 2025	21:00	Valencia	H	1–1	Mendy 37'	11,267	Javier Alberola Rojas
15	7 December 2025	18:30	Espanyol	A	0–1		28,110	José María Sánchez Martínez
16	15 December 2025	21:00	Real Betis	H	0–0			
17	21 December 2025	18:30	Elche	A	0–4			
18	4 January 2026		Getafe	H				
19	11 January 2026		Mallorca	H				
20	18 January 2026		Celta Vigo	A				
21	25 January 2026		Osasuna	H				
22	1 February 2026		Real Madrid	A				
23	8 February 2026		Real Oviedo	H				
24	15 February 2026		Atlético Madrid	H				
25	22 February 2026		Real Betis	A				
26	1 March 2026		Athletic Bilbao	H				
27	8 March 2026		Sevilla	A				
28	15 March 2026		Levante	H				
29	22 March 2026		Barcelona	A	1-0		56,812	
30	5 April 2026		Elche	H				
31	12 April 2026		Mallorca	A				
32	19 April 2026		Real Sociedad	H				
33	22 April 2026		Espanyol	H				
34	3 May 2026		Getafe	A				
35	10 May 2026		Girona	H				
36	13 May 2026		Valencia	A				
37	17 May 2026		Villarreal	H				
38	24 May 2026		Alavés	A				

=== Copa del Rey ===
Kickoff times are in CET.

Win Draw Loss

Round	Date	Time	Opponents	H / A	Result F–A	Scorers	Attendance	Referee
First round	29 October 2025	21:00	Yuncos	A	6–1	Pérez (3) 36', 38', 40', Gumbau 56', Óscar Trejo 79', Camello 82'		José Luis Munuera Montero
Second round	4 December 2025	19:00	Ávila	A	2–1 (a.e.t.)	Isi 90+4', García 120'		Adrián Cordero Vega
Round of 32	6 January 2026	19:00	Granada	A	3–1	García 49', Díaz 74', Flores 90+2 (o.g.)	4,468	César Soto Grado
Round of 16	13 January 2026	21:00	Alavés	A	0–2		10,634	Francisco José Hernández Maeso

=== UEFA Conference League ===
Kickoff times are in CET.

Win Draw Loss

==== Play-off round ====
Round	Date	Time	Opponents	H / A	Result F–A	Scorers	Attendance	Referee
First leg	21 August 2025	20:00	Neman Grodno	N	1–0	García 77'	0 (Note: Belarusian clubs were required to play their home matches at neutral venues and behind closed doors due to the country's involvement in the Russian invasion of Ukraine.)	Arda Kardeşler (Turkey)
Second leg	28 August 2025	20:00	Neman Grodno	H	4–0 (5–0 agg.)	García (2) 64', 89', Camello 66', De Frutos 80'	12,404	Jérémie Pignard (France)

==== League phase ====
Pos	Team	Pld	W	D	L	GF	GA	GD	Pts	Qualification
3	(Hellenic Football Federation) AEK Athens	6	4	1	1	14	7	+7	13	Advance to round of 16 (seeded)
4	(Football Association of the Czech Republic) Sparta Prague	6	4	1	1	10	3	+7	13	Advance to round of 16 (seeded)
5	(Royal Spanish Football Federation) Rayo Vallecano	6	4	1	1	13	7	+6	13	Advance to round of 16 (seeded)
6	(Ukrainian Association of Football) Shakhtar Donetsk	6	4	1	1	10	5	+5	13	Advance to round of 16 (seeded)
7	(German Football Association) Mainz 05	6	4	1	1	7	3	+4	13	Advance to round of 16 (seeded)

Source: UEFA
Rules for classification: League phase tiebreakers

===== Results by round =====
Round	1	2	3	4	5	6
Ground	H	A	H	A	A	H
Result	W	D	W	L	W	W
Position	8	7	6	12	11	5
Points	3	4	7	7	10	13

Source: UEFA
A = Away; H = Home; W = Win; D = Draw; L = Loss

===== Matches =====
Kickoff times are in CET.

Win Draw Loss

Round	Date	Time	Opponents	H / A	Result F–A	Scorers	Attendance	Referee
Round 1	2 October 2025	18:45	Shkëndija	H	2–0	López 28', Pérez 32'	8,842	Mohammad Al-Emara (Finland)
Round 2	23 October 2025	18:45	Häcken	A	2–2	García 15', Rațiu 90+13' (pen.)	6,408	Antoni Bandić (Bosnia and Herzegovina)
Round 3	6 November 2025	21:00	Lech Poznań	H	3–2	Isi 58', De Frutos 83', García 90+4'	10,029	Viktor Kopiyevskyi (Ukraine)
Round 4	27 November 2025	18:45	Slovan Bratislava	A	1–2	Pérez 24'	16,502	Lawrence Visser (Belgium)
Round 5	11 December 2025	18:45	Jagiellonia Białystok	A	2–1	Camello 6', Espino 61'	17,534	Bulat Sariyev (Kazakhstan)
Round 6	18 December 2025	21:00	Drita	H	3–0	Lejeune 33', Gumbau 66', Espino 83'	9,300	Urs Schnyder (Switzerland)

==== Knockout phase ====
Round	Date	Time	Opponents	H / A	Result F–A	Scorers	Attendance	Referee
Round of 16 / First leg	12 March 2026	18:45	Samsunspor	A	3–1	Alemão (2) 15', 78', García 40'	18,095	Marian Barbu (Romania)
Second leg	19 March 2026	21:00	Samsunspor	H	0–1		10,351	Sascha Stegemann (Germany)
Quarter-finals / First leg	9 April 2026	18:45	AEK Athens	H	3–0	Akhomach 2', López 45+2', Isi 74' (pen.)	13,184	Benoît Bastien (France)
Second leg	16 April 2026	21:00	AEK Athens	A	1–3	Isi 60'	31,100	Espen Eskås (Norway)
Semi-finals / First leg	30 April 2026	21:00	Strasbourg	H	1–0	Alemão 54'	14,333	Donatas Rumšas (Lithuania)
Second leg	7 May 2026	21:00	Strasbourg	A	1–0	Alemão 42'	31,071	Ivan Kružliak (Slovakia)
Final	27 May 2026	21:00	Crystal Palace	N	0–1		39,176	Maurizio Mariani (Italy)

== Statistics ==
=== Overall ===
As of 2 October 2025

No.	Pos.	Nat.	Player	Total		La Liga		Copa del Rey		Conference League		Discipline		Notes
No.	Pos.	Nat.	Player	Apps	Goals	Apps	Goals	Apps	Goals	Apps	Goals	Yellow card	Red card	Notes
Goalkeepers
1	GK	(Spain)	Daniel Cárdenas	0	0	0	0	0	0	0	0	0	0	
13	GK	(Argentina)	Augusto Batalla	10	0	7	0	0	0	3	0	1	0	
30	GK	(Spain)	Juanpe Gil	0	0	0	0	0	0	0	0	0	0	
40	GK	(Spain)	Adrián Molina	0	0	0	0	0	0	0	0	0	0	
Defenders
2	DF	(Romania)	Andrei Rațiu	7+1	0	7	0	0	0	0+1	0	1	0	
3	DF	(Spain)	Pep Chavarría	6+1	1	6+1	1	0	0	0	0	3	0	
5	DF	(Italy)	Luiz Felipe	4	0	4	0	0	0	0	0	1	0	
16	DF	(Ghana)	Abdul Mumin	0	0	0	0	0	0	0	0	0	0	
20	DF	(Albania)	Iván Balliu	4+1	0	1+1	0	0	0	3	0	1	0	
22	DF	(Uruguay)	Pacha Espino	5+3	0	2+3	0	0	0	3	0	0	0	
24	DF	(France)	Florian Lejeune	10	0	7	0	0	0	3	0	1	0	
26	DF	(Spain)	Marco de las Sías	0	0	0	0	0	0	0	0	0	0	
32	DF	(Senegal)	Nobel Mendy	0	0	0	0	0	0	0	0	0	0	
33	DF	(Netherlands)	Jozhua Vertrouwd	4+1	0	1+1	0	0	0	3	0	1	0	
Midfielders
4	MF	(Spain)	Pedro Díaz	6+3	0	6+1	0	0	0	0+2	0	0	0	
6	MF	(Senegal)	Pathé Ciss	6+2	0	6+1	0	0	0	0+1	0	2	0	
7	MF	(Spain)	Isi	7+3	1	7	1	0	0	0+3	0	2	0	
8	MF	(Argentina)	Óscar Trejo	4+2	0	1+2	0	0	0	3	0	1	0	
15	MF	(Spain)	Gerard Gumbau	3+4	0	0+4	0	0	0	3	0	1	0	
17	MF	(Spain)	Unai López	7+3	1	5+2	0	0	0	2+1	1	2	0	
18	MF	(Spain)	Álvaro García	7+3	5	6+1	2	0	0	1+2	3	1	0	
23	MF	(Spain)	Óscar Valentín	4+2	0	3+2	0	0	0	1	0	0	0	
28	MF	(Spain)	Samu Becerra	0+4	0	0+3	0	0	0	0+1	0	0	0	
29	MF	(Spain)	Diego Méndez	0	0	0	0	0	0	0	0	0	0	
Forwards
9	FW	(Brazil)	Alemão	2+2	0	2+2	0	0	0	0	0	0	0	
10	FW	(Spain)	Sergio Camello	4+4	1	1+4	0	0	0	3	1	1	1	
11	FW	(Angola)	Randy Nteka	2+2	0	0+2	0	0	0	2	0	0	0	
19	FW	(Spain)	Jorge de Frutos	6+3	3	6	2	0	0	0+3	1	0	0	
21	FW	(Spain)	Fran Pérez	4+3	2	1+3	1	0	0	3	1	0	0	
No longer with club
27	DF	(Spain)	Pelayo Fernández	0+2	0	0+1	0	0	0	0+1	0	0	0	

=== Goalscorers ===
As of 4 December 2025

Rank	No.	Pos.	Nat.	Player	La Liga	Copa del Rey	Conference League	Total
1	18	MF	(Spain)	Álvaro García	3	1	5	9
2	19	FW	(Spain)	Jorge de Frutos	4	—	2	6
2	21	MF	(Spain)	Fran Pérez	1	3	2	6
4	7	MF	(Spain)	Isi	1	1	1	3
5	10	FW	(Spain)	Sergio Camello	—	1	1	2
6	3	DF	(Spain)	Pep Chavarría	1	—	—	1
6	17	MF	(Spain)	Unai López	—	—	1	1
6	22	DF	(Uruguay)	Pacha Espino	1	—	—	1
6	9	FW	(Brazil)	Alemão	1	—	—	1
6	15	MF	(Spain)	Gerard Gumbau	—	1	—	1
6	8	MF	(Argentina)	Óscar Trejo	—	1	—	1
6	2	DF	(Romania)	Andrei Rațiu	—	—	1	1
6	32	DF	(Senegal)	Nobel Mendy	1	—	—	1
Own goals (from the opponents)					—	—	—	0
Totals					13	8	13	34
