= Pep Chavarría =

Spanish footballer (born 1998)

Personal information
- Full name: Josep María Chavarría Pérez
- Date of birth: 10 April 1998 (age 28)
- Place of birth: Figueres, Spain
- Height: 1.74 m (5 ft 9 in)
- Position: Left-back

Team information
- Current team: Chelsea
- Number: 29

Youth career
- Figueres

Senior career*
Years	Team	Apps	(Gls)
2016–2018	Figueres	36	(0)
2018–2020	Olot	51	(2)
2020–2022	Zaragoza	74	(1)
2022–2026	Rayo Vallecano	105	(2)
2026–	Chelsea	9	(0)
- * Club domestic league appearances and goals as of 21 November 2026

Josep María "Pep" Chavarría Pérez (born 10 April 1998) is a Spanish professional footballer who plays as a left-back for Premier League club Chelsea.

== Career ==
=== Early career ===
Chavarría was born in Figueres, Girona, Catalonia, and underwent his development with the local club. On 10 September 2016, aged just 18, he made his first team debut by playing the last 11 minutes of a 4–0 Tercera División away loss against Peralada.

On 10 July 2018, after becoming a starter for Figueres, Chavarría moved to Segunda División B side Olot. He scored his first senior goal on 10 November 2018, netting the opener in a 2–1 away win against Villarreal B.

=== Real Zaragoza ===
On 25 August 2020, Chavarría agreed to a four-year contract with Real Zaragoza in the Segunda División. He made his professional debut on 26 September, starting in a 2–2 home draw against Las Palmas.

Chavarría scored his first professional goal on 19 December 2020, netting the winner in a 1–0 home success over Lugo.

=== Rayo Vallecano ===
On 31 August 2022, Chavarría signed a five-year deal with La Liga side Rayo Vallecano. He scored his first goal for the club in a 2–1 victory over Osasuna on 20 April 2024. On 24 September 2025, Chavarría scored a long-range shot in a 3–2 away defeat against Atlético Madrid.

=== Chelsea ===
On 12 August 2026, Chavarría joined Premier League club Chelsea on a five-year contract for an initial £16.3 million, plus £1.7 million in possible add-ons.

== Career statistics ==
As of match played 21 November 2026

Appearances and goals by club, season and competition
Club	Season	League			National cup (Note: Includes Copa del Rey, FA Cup)		League cup (Note: Includes EFL Cup)		Europe		Total	
Club	Season	Division	Apps	Goals	Apps	Goals	Apps	Goals	Apps	Goals	Apps	Goals
Olot	2018–19	Segunda División B	26	1	—		—		—		26	1
Olot	2019–20	Segunda División B	25	1	1	1	—		—		26	2
Olot	Total		51	2	1	1	—		—		52	3
Real Zaragoza	2020–21	Segunda División	36	1	1	0	—		—		37	1
Real Zaragoza	2021–22	Segunda División	36	0	1	0	—		—		37	0
Real Zaragoza	2022–23	Segunda División	2	0	—		—		—		2	0
Real Zaragoza	Total		74	1	2	0	—		—		76	1
Rayo Vallecano	2022–23	La Liga	16	0	3	0	—		—		19	0
Rayo Vallecano	2023–24	La Liga	22	1	4	0	—		—		26	1
Rayo Vallecano	2024–25	La Liga	34	0	2	0	—		—		36	0
Rayo Vallecano	2025–26	La Liga	33	1	3	0	—		8 (Note: Appearances in the UEFA Conference League)	0	44	1
Rayo Vallecano	Total		105	2	12	0	—		8	0	125	2
Chelsea	2026–27	Premier League	9	0	0	0	2	0	—		11	0
Career total			236	5	15	1	2	0	8	0	261	6

== Honours ==
Rayo Vallecano

- UEFA Conference League runner-up: 2025–26
