= Abdul Mumin =

Ghanaian footballer

Personal information
- Full name: Khalid Abdul Mumin Suleman
- Date of birth: 6 June 1998 (age 28)
- Place of birth: Accra, Ghana
- Height: 1.88 m (6 ft 2 in)
- Position: Centre-back

Team information
- Current team: Girona

Youth career
- Right to Dream
- 2016–2017: Nordsjælland

Senior career*
Years	Team	Apps	(Gls)
2016–2020	Nordsjælland	43	(1)
2018	→ HB Køge (loan)	13	(0)
2020–2022	Vitória Guimarães	51	(0)
2022–2026	Rayo Vallecano	63	(3)
2026–	Girona	6	(0)

International career^{‡}
2024–	Ghana	4	(0)
- * Club domestic league appearances and goals as of 24 October 2026 ‡ National team caps and goals as of 18:36, 11 November 2024 (UTC)

Khalid Abdul Mumin Suleman (born 6 June 1998), commonly known as Abdul Mumin, is a Ghanaian professional footballer who plays as a centre-back for Segunda División club Girona and the Ghana national team.

== Club career ==
=== Youth ===
Mumin was born in Accra and was a part of the academy at Right to Dream. The defender was an integral part of the RtD U18 team, helping them win back-to-back Gothia Cup tournaments in 2014 and in 2015.

=== FC Nordsjælland ===
On 2 August 2016, it was confirmed, that Mumin had signed a professional contract with Danish Superliga side FC Nordsjælland, and joined their U19 squad.

Mumin made his Nordsjælland debut on 7 August 2016, just a few days after signing with the club. Mumin started on the bench, but replaced Viktor Tranberg in the 62nd minute in a 2–1 defeat against AaB in the Danish Superliga.

He was promoted to the first team squad for the 2017–18 season. After Nordsjælland sold Andreas Skovgaard in January 2019, Mumin began to play continuously.

==== Loan to HB Køge ====
On 23 January 2018, Mumin was loaned out to Danish 1st Division club HB Køge for the rest of the season.

=== Vitória de Guimarães ===
On 15 August 2020, Portuguese Primeira Liga club Vitória S.C. signed Mumin on a four-year deal. Mumin got shirt number 6 and made his official debut for the club in the Primeira Liga on 18 September 2020 against Belenenses SAD, playing all 90 minutes.

=== Rayo Vallecano ===
On 1 September 2022, Mumin signed a four-year contract with La Liga side Rayo Vallecano. Mumin got his debut for the Spanish side on 17 September 2022 against Athletic Bilbao.

On 1 March 2025, Mumin sustained a cruciate ligament injury in a match against Sevilla, which was expected to keep him sidelined for an extended period.

=== Girona ===
On 18 August 2026, free agent Mumin was announced at Segunda División side Girona on a three-year deal.

== International career ==
At the end of December 2021, Mumin received his first call-up to the Ghana national team, being summoned to the squad for the 2021 Africa Cup of Nations in January 2022.

Mumin made his debut on 6 June 2024 in a World Cup qualifier against Mali at the Stade du 26 Mars. He substituted Alidu Seidu in the 79th minute, Ghana won 2–1 through an added-time goal by Jordan Ayew.

== Career statistics ==
As of match played 24 October 2026

Appearances and goals by club, season and competition
Club	Season	League			National cup		League cup		Europe		Other		Total	
Club	Season	Division	Apps	Goals	Apps	Goals	Apps	Goals	Apps	Goals	Apps	Goals	Apps	Goals
Nordsjælland	2016–17	Danish Superliga	3	0	1	0	—		—		—		4	0
Nordsjælland	2018–19	Danish Superliga	14	0	0	0	—		1 (Note: Appearance in UEFA Europa League)	0	—		15	0
Nordsjælland	2019–20	Danish Superliga	26	1	2	0	—		—		—		28	1
Nordsjælland	Total		43	1	3	0	0	0	1	0	0	0	47	1
HB Køge (loan)	2017–18	Danish 1st Division	13	0	—		—		—		—		13	0
Vitória de Guimarães	2020–21	Primeira Liga	25	0	2	0	1	0	—		—		28	0
Vitória de Guimarães	2021–22	Primeira Liga	26	0	0	0	0	0	4 (Note: Appearances in UEFA Conference League)	0	—		32	0
Vitória de Guimarães	Total		51	0	2	0	1	0	4	0	0	0	58	0
Rayo Vallecano	2022–23	La Liga	16	0	1	0	—		—		—		17	0
Rayo Vallecano	2023–24	La Liga	20	1	2	0	—		—		—		22	1
Rayo Vallecano	2024–25	La Liga	24	2	1	0	—		—		—		25	2
Rayo Vallecano	2025–26	La Liga	3	0	0	0	—		0	0	—		3	0
Rayo Vallecano	Total		63	3	4	0	0	0	0	0	0	0	67	3
Girona	2026–27	Segunda División	6	0	0	0	—		—		—		6	0
Career total			176	4	9	0	1	0	4	0	0	0	190	4

== Honours ==
Individual

- La Liga Goal of the Month: September 2024
