= Jorge de Frutos =

Spanish footballer

Personal information
- Date of birth: 20 February 1997 (age 29)
- Place of birth: Navares de Enmedio, Spain
- Height: 1.73 m (5 ft 8 in)
- Position: Right winger

Team information
- Current team: Rayo Vallecano
- Number: 19

Youth career
- 2013–2014: Sepúlveda
- 2014–2015: Cantalejo
- 2015–2016: Rayo Majadahonda

Senior career*
Years	Team	Apps	(Gls)
2016–2018	Rayo Majadahonda	49	(10)
2018–2020	Real Madrid B	35	(7)
2019–2020	→ Valladolid (loan)	3	(0)
2020	→ Rayo Vallecano (loan)	16	(2)
2020–2023	Levante	101	(11)
2023–	Rayo Vallecano	116	(20)

International career^{‡}
2025–	Spain	2	(0)
- * Club domestic league appearances and goals as of 8 November 2026 ‡ National team caps and goals as of 12 November 2026

Jorge de Frutos Sebastián (born 20 February 1997) is a Spanish professional footballer who plays as a right-winger for La Liga club Rayo Vallecano and the Spain national team.

== Club career ==
=== Early career ===
Born in Navares de Enmedio, Segovia, Castile and León, de Frutos represented CDP Sepúlveda, CD Cantalejo, and CF Rayo Majadahonda as a youngster. Promoted to the latter's main squad ahead of the 2016–17 season, he made his senior debut on 20 August 2016 by coming on as a second half substitute in a goalless Segunda División B away draw against Sestao River Club.

De Frutos scored his first senior goal on 29 October 2016, netting the game's only in an away defeat against Gernika Club. He became a regular starter during the 2017–18 campaign, appearing in 34 matches and scoring nine goals as his side achieved promotion to Segunda División for the first time ever; highlights included braces against Gimnástica Segoviana CF and Racing de Ferrol.

=== Real Madrid and loan moves ===
On 1 May 2018, De Frutos agreed on a pre-contract with Real Madrid, effective as of 1 July; upon arriving, he was assigned to the reserves also in the third division.

On 25 June 2019, De Frutos moved to another La Liga club Real Valladolid on loan for the season. He made his professional debut on 20 October, replacing Javi Moyano in a 1–1 away draw against Athletic Bilbao. On 17 January 2020 after only three league appearances, he moved to Segunda División side Rayo Vallecano also on loan.

=== Levante and Rayo Vallecano ===
On 29 July 2020, de Frutos agreed to a five-year contract with Levante UD in the top tier. On 17 August 2023, de Frutos returned to Rayo Vallecano on a five-year contract, with the club now in the first division.

== International career ==
On 7 September 2025, De Frutos debuted for the Spain national team in a 2026 FIFA World Cup qualification against Turkey, which ended in a 6–0 victory for his country.

== Career statistics ==
As of match played 24 October 2026

Appearances and goals by club, season and competition
Club	Season	League			Copa del Rey		Europe		Other		Total	
Club	Season	Division	Apps	Goals	Apps	Goals	Apps	Goals	Apps	Goals	Apps	Goals
Rayo Majadahonda	2016–17	Segunda División B Group 2	15	1	—		—		1 (Note: Appearance(s) in Segunda División B play-offs)	0	16	1
Rayo Majadahonda	2017–18	Segunda División B Group 1	34	9	0	0	—		4	0	38	9
Rayo Majadahonda	Total		49	10	0	0	—		5	0	54	10
Real Madrid Castilla	2018–19	Segunda División B Group 1	35	7	—		—		2	0	37	7
Real Madrid Castilla	2019–20	Segunda División B Group 1	0	0	—		—		—		0	0
Real Madrid Castilla	Total		35	7	—		—		2	0	37	7
Real Valladolid (loan)	2019–20	La Liga	3	0	2	0	—		—		5	0
Rayo Vallecano (loan)	2019–20	Segunda División	16	2	2	0	—		—		18	2
Levante	2020–21	La Liga	37	4	4	0	—		—		41	4
Levante	2021–22	La Liga	25	4	0	0	—		—		25	4
Levante	2022–23	Segunda División	39	3	3	0	—		4 (Note: Appearances in La Liga promotion play-offs)	2	46	5
Levante	Total		101	11	7	0	—		4	2	112	13
Rayo Vallecano	2023–24	La Liga	36	2	4	0	—		—		40	2
Rayo Vallecano	2024–25	La Liga	36	6	3	2	—		—		39	8
Rayo Vallecano	2025–26	La Liga	36	10	3	0	14 (Note: Appearances in UEFA Conference League)	2	—		53	12
Rayo Vallecano	2026–27	La Liga	6	0	0	0	—		—		6	0
Rayo Vallecano	Total		114	18	10	2	14	2	—		138	22
Career total			318	48	21	2	14	2	11	2	364	54

=== International ===
As of match played 12 November 2026

Appearances and goals by national team and year
National team	Year	Apps	Goals
Spain	2025	1	0
Spain	2026	1	0
Total		2	0

== Honours ==
Rayo Vallecano

- UEFA Conference League runner-up: 2025–26
