= Unai López =

Spanish footballer

Personal information
- Full name: Unai López Cabrera
- Date of birth: 30 October 1995 (age 31)
- Place of birth: Errenteria, Spain
- Height: 1.70 m (5 ft 7 in)
- Position: Defensive midfielder

Team information
- Current team: Rayo Vallecano
- Number: 17

Youth career
- 2008–2010: Antiguoko
- 2010–2011: Real Sociedad
- 2011–2013: Athletic Bilbao

Senior career*
Years	Team	Apps	(Gls)
2012–2013	Basconia	21	(2)
2013–2016	Bilbao Athletic	73	(6)
2014–2021	Athletic Bilbao	78	(4)
2016–2017	→ Leganés (loan)	23	(2)
2017–2018	→ Rayo Vallecano (loan)	39	(3)
2021–	Rayo Vallecano	164	(5)

International career
2011	Spain U16	5	(2)
2013	Spain U18	1	(0)
2013–2014	Spain U19	12	(3)
2014	Spain U21	2	(0)
- * Club domestic league appearances and goals as of 16:00, 24 October 2026 (UTC)

Unai López Cabrera (Basque: [unai lopes̻]; Spanish: [ˈunaj ˈlopeθ]; born 30 October 1995) is a Spanish professional footballer who plays as a defensive midfielder for La Liga club Rayo Vallecano.

== Club career ==
Born in Errenteria, Gipuzkoa, López joined Athletic Bilbao's youth system in 2011 at the age of 14 from neighbouring Real Sociedad, after starting out at Antiguoko. He made his debut as a senior with the farm team in the 2012–13 season in the Tercera División, and in July 2013 was promoted to the reserves in the Segunda División B.

López was called up to the main squad by manager Ernesto Valverde on 2 July 2014, for pre-season matches. In August, he was also included in a B list for that campaign's UEFA Champions League.

On 27 August 2014, López was named on the bench for the Champions League play-off match against SSC Napoli. He made his first-team debut the following day, coming on as a substitute for Markel Susaeta in the 72nd minute of a 3–1 home win and also providing an assist to Ibai Gómez in the last goal. His La Liga bow took place on the 30th, when he featured 23 minutes in the 3–0 defeat of Levante UD also at the San Mamés Stadium.

On 26 July 2016, after a season back at the B side in the Segunda División, López was loaned to CD Leganés for one year. On 1 August of the following year, he moved to second-tier club Rayo Vallecano on a one-year loan deal.

López scored his first competitive goal for Athletic on 8 March 2020, from a free kick to open a 4–1 away league victory over Real Valladolid. He featured regularly during the 2019–20 campaign, but subsequently fell down the pecking order after the emergence of newer youth prospects such as Oihan Sancet, Unai Vencedor and Oier Zarraga.

On 31 August 2021, López returned to Rayo on a three-year contract; Athletic retained a first refusal clause on any future transfer, while also receiving "a series of economic compensations". He went on to make 222 appearances across two spells with ten goals, including 13 for the finalists of the 2025–26 UEFA Conference League.

== International career ==
López represented Spain at under-16, under-18, under-19 and under-21 levels. He made his debut for the last of those age groups on 9 September 2014, in a 1–1 home draw against Austria for the 2015 UEFA European Championship qualifiers.

== Career statistics ==
As of match played 24 October 2026

Appearances and goals by club, season and competition
Club	Season	League			National Cup		Continental		Total	
Club	Season	Division	Apps	Goals	Apps	Goals	Apps	Goals	Apps	Goals
Basconia	2012–13	Tercera División	21	2	—		—		21	2
Bilbao Athletic	2013–14	Segunda División B	33	4	—		—		33	4
Bilbao Athletic	2015–16	Segunda División	40	2	—		—		40	2
Bilbao Athletic	Total		73	6	—		—		73	6
Athletic Bilbao	2014–15	La Liga	19	0	1	0	4 (Note: Three appearances in UEFA Champions League, one appearance in UEFA Europa League)	0	24	0
Athletic Bilbao	2018–19	La Liga	7	0	1	0	—		8	0
Athletic Bilbao	2019–20	La Liga	26	1	4 (Note: Includes appearance in 2020 Copa del Rey final (played in 2021))	0	—		30	1
Athletic Bilbao	2020–21	La Liga	26	3	5	0	—		31	3
Athletic Bilbao	Total		78	4	11	0	4	0	93	4
Leganés (loan)	2016–17	La Liga	23	2	1	0	—		24	2
Rayo Vallecano (loan)	2017–18	Segunda División	39	3	1	0	—		40	3
Rayo Vallecano	2021–22	La Liga	27	0	3	0	—		30	0
Rayo Vallecano	2022–23	La Liga	34	1	2	0	—		36	0
Rayo Vallecano	2023–24	La Liga	35	1	4	0	—		39	1
Rayo Vallecano	2024–25	La Liga	32	3	2	0	—		34	3
Rayo Vallecano	2025–26	La Liga	28	0	2	0	13 (Note: Appearances in UEFA Conference League)	2	43	2
Rayo Vallecano	2026–27	La Liga	8	0	0	0	—		8	0
Rayo Vallecano	Total		164	5	13	0	13	2	190	7
Career total			398	22	26	0	17	2	441	24

== Honours ==
Rayo Vallecano

- Segunda División: 2017–18

Athletic Bilbao

- Copa del Rey runner-up: 2019–20, 2020–21

Rayo Vallecano

- UEFA Conference League runner-up: 2025–26
