= Navares de Enmedio =

- Municipality
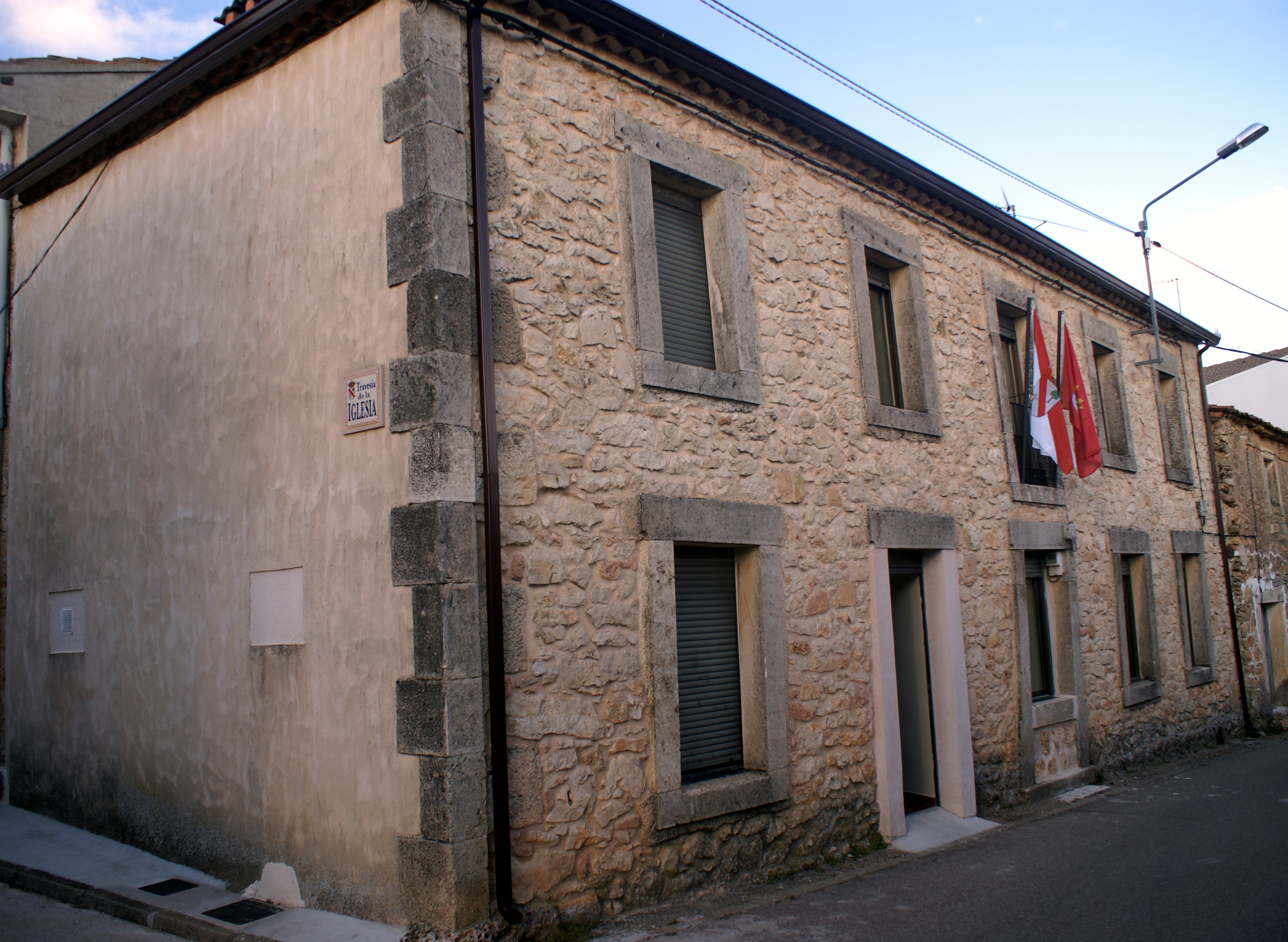
- Town Hall Building of Navares de Enmedio

- Location in Spain. Navares de Enmedio (Spain)
- Coordinates: 41°22′52″N 3°43′23″W
- Country: Spain
- Autonomous community: Castile and León
- Province: Segovia
- Municipality: Navares de Enmedio

Area
  - Total: 24 km^{2} (9.3 sq mi)

Population (2025-01-01)
  - Total: 90
  - Density: 3.8/km^{2} (9.7/sq mi)
- Time zone: UTC+1 (CET)
  - Summer (DST): UTC+2 (CEST)
- Website: Official website

Navares de Enmedio is a municipality located in the province of Segovia, Castile and León, Spain. According to the 2004 census (INE), the municipality has a population of 136 inhabitants.

== Notable people ==
- Jorge de Frutos (born 1997), professional footballer
