= Isi Palazón =

Spanish footballer

- Isi Palazón with Rayo Vallecano 2021

Personal information
- Full name: Isaac Palazón Camacho
- Date of birth: 27 December 1994 (age 31)
- Place of birth: Cieza, Spain
- Height: 1.69 m (5 ft 7 in)
- Positions: Attacking midfielder; right midfielder

Team information
- Current team: Rayo Vallecano
- Number: 7

Youth career
- Cieza
- 2007–2009: Real Madrid
- 2010–2012: Villarreal

Senior career*
Years	Team	Apps	(Gls)
2009–2010	Cieza		
2012–2013	Villarreal C	13	(1)
2013–2014	Cieza	4	(4)
2014–2015	Murcia B	18	(8)
2015–2017	Murcia	73	(9)
2017–2020	Ponferradina	84	(11)
2020–	Rayo Vallecano	234	(32)
- * Club domestic league appearances and goals as of 21 November 2026

Isaac Palazón Camacho (born 27 December 1994), better known as Isi Palazón, is a Spanish professional footballer who plays as attacking midfielder or right midfielder for La Liga club Rayo Vallecano.

== Career ==
Palazón was born in Cieza, Murcia, and made his senior debut with CD Cieza at the age of just 15, after spending a short period at Real Madrid's La Fábrica. He subsequently moved to Villarreal CF's youth setup, reaching the C-team before being released in 2013; he then returned to his first club Cieza.

In 2014, Palazón joined Real Murcia and was initially assigned to the reserves in Tercera División. On 18 December of that year, he agreed to a new three-year contract with the club, being definitely promoted to the main squad in Segunda División B the following year.

On 18 August 2017, Palazón moved to fellow third division side SD Ponferradina, after terminating his contract with Murcia. He contributed with eight goals in 40 appearances during the 2018–19 season, as his side returned to Segunda División after a three-year absence.

Palazón made his professional debut on 18 August 2019, starting in a 3–1 away loss against Cádiz CF. He scored his first goal in the category on 26 October, netting his team's second in a 3–1 away defeat of Rayo Vallecano

On 23 January 2020, Palazón signed a three-and-a-half-year contract with fellow second division side Rayo.

== Career statistics ==
As of match played 21 November 2026

Appearances and goals by club, season and competition
Club	Season	League			Copa del Rey		Europe		Other		Total	
Club	Season	Division	Apps	Goals	Apps	Goals	Apps	Goals	Apps	Goals	Apps	Goals
Cieza	2013–14	Tercera División	4	4	0	0	—		—		4	4
Murcia B	2014–15	Tercera División	18	8	0	0	—		—		18	8
Murcia	2014–15	Segunda División B	14	6	0	0	—		2 (Note: Appearances in Segunda División promotion play-offs)	1	16	7
Murcia	2015–16	Segunda División B	27	1	1	0	—		2	1	30	2
Murcia	2016–17	Segunda División B	32	2	1	0	—		—		33	2
Murcia	Total		73	9	2	0	—		4	2	79	11
Ponferradina	2017–18	Segunda División B	29	5	4	0	—		—		33	5
Ponferradina	2018–19	Segunda División B	34	4	0	0	—		6	4	40	8
Ponferradina	2019–20	Segunda División	21	2	1	0	—		—		22	2
Ponferradina	Total		84	11	5	0	—		6	4	95	15
Rayo Vallecano	2019–20	Segunda División	14	1	1	0	—		—		15	1
Rayo Vallecano	2020–21	Segunda División	39	9	4	0	—		4 (Note: Appearances in La Liga promotion play-offs)	1	47	10
Rayo Vallecano	2021–22	La Liga	34	2	6	0	—		—		40	2
Rayo Vallecano	2022–23	La Liga	37	9	3	0	—		—		40	9
Rayo Vallecano	2023–24	La Liga	37	4	2	1	—		—		39	5
Rayo Vallecano	2024–25	La Liga	35	4	3	0	—		—		38	4
Rayo Vallecano	2025–26	La Liga	31	3	4	1	15 (Note: Appearances in UEFA Conference League)	3	—		50	7
Rayo Vallecano	2026–27	La Liga	7	0	0	0	—		—		7	0
Rayo Vallecano	Total		234	32	23	2	15	3	4	1	276	38
Career total			413	64	30	2	15	3	14	7	472	76

== Honours ==
Rayo Vallecano

- UEFA Conference League runner-up: 2025–26

Individual

- UEFA Conference League Team of the Season: 2025–26
