= José Ángel Pozo =

Spanish footballer

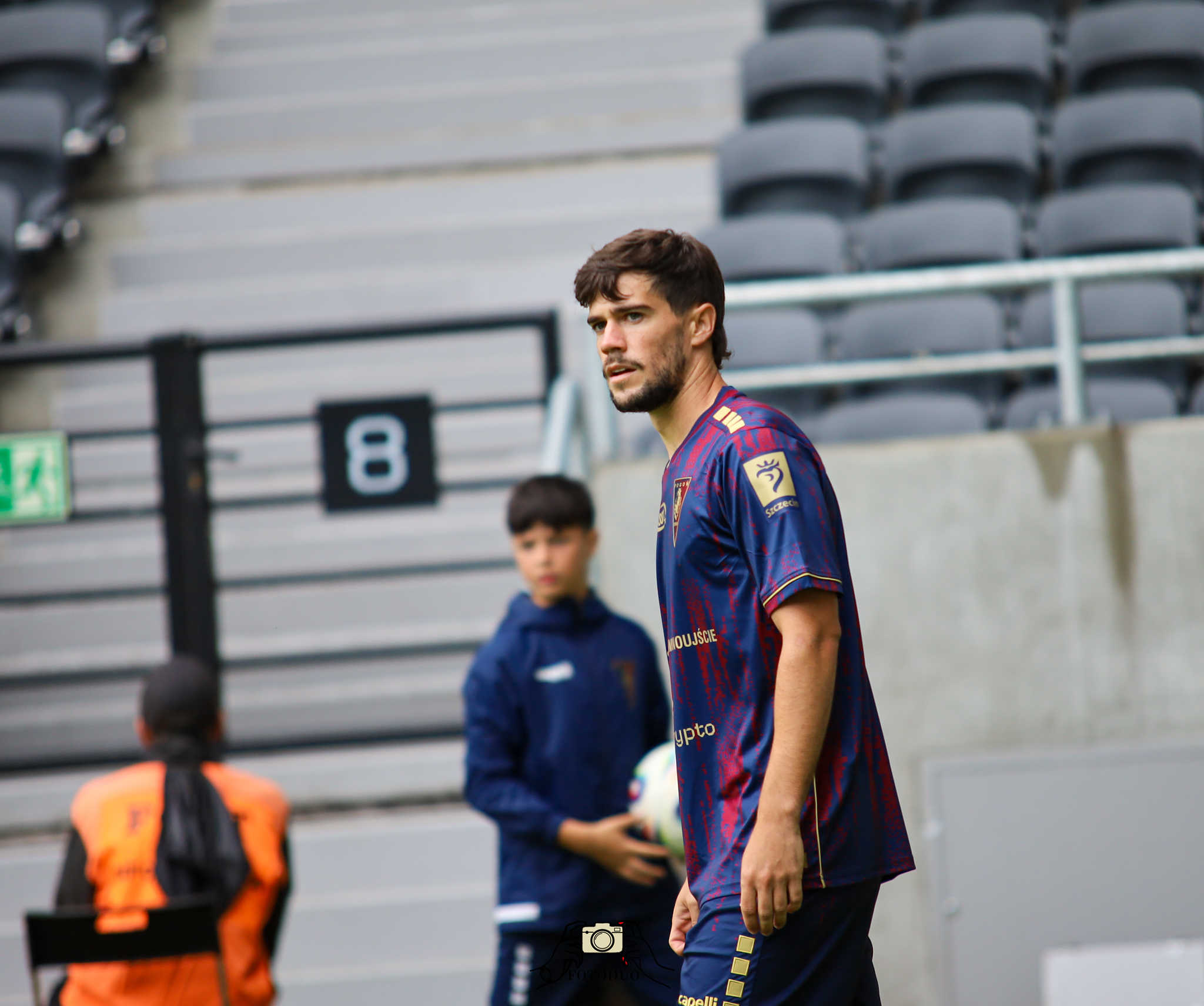
- Pozo with Pogoń Szczecin in 2025

Personal information
- Full name: José Ángel Pozo la Rosa
- Date of birth: 15 March 1996 (age 30)
- Place of birth: Fuengirola, Spain
- Height: 1.71 m (5 ft 7 in)
- Position: Attacking midfielder

Team information
- Current team: Pogoń Szczecin
- Number: 88

Youth career
- Fuengirola
- 2007–2012: Real Madrid
- 2012–2014: Manchester City

Senior career*
Years	Team	Apps	(Gls)
2014–2015	Manchester City	3	(0)
2015–2018	Almería	104	(6)
2018–2024	Rayo Vallecano	100	(9)
2022	→ Al Ahli SC (loan)	9	(4)
2024–2025	Karmiotissa	17	(2)
2025	Śląsk Wrocław	15	(1)
2025–	Pogoń Szczecin	19	(2)

International career
2012	Spain U16	2	(1)
2011–2013	Spain U17	8	(3)
2014	Spain U18	3	(0)
2014	Spain U19	2	(0)
2018	Spain U21	1	(0)
- * Club domestic league appearances and goals as of 20:59, 25 March 2026 (UTC)

José Ángel Pozo la Rosa (born 15 March 1996) is a Spanish professional footballer who plays as an attacking midfielder for Ekstraklasa club Pogoń Szczecin.

== Club career ==
=== Early career ===
Born in Fuengirola, Málaga, Pozo started his football career at UD Fuengirola Los Boliches and was scouted by Real Madrid at the age of 11 to play for its youth set-up. He played for Real Madrid for five years before Manchester City paid £2.4 million to sign him in early 2012. The deal also brought over Pozo's younger brother Iker to play for Manchester City at academy level.

=== Manchester City ===
Playing for the English club's under-18s side, his first full season in England was impressive, netting him a nomination for Academy Player of the Year but his second season was cut short early by an ankle injury which limited him to just nine appearances for 2013–14. Nevertheless, he made a strong recovery and rejoined the Elite Development Side under Patrick Vieira, where he rapidly drew attention, earning himself the label of "Mini-Messi".

Pozo's first exposure to first team football came on 24 September 2014, when injuries to squad mates Sergio Agüero and Stevan Jovetić left him as the club's second most senior striker for the club's Football League Cup third round match at home against Sheffield Wednesday. Named as a substitute amidst a flurry of national press attention following comments by manager Manuel Pellegrini on the possibility of his appearing, Pozo was brought on in the 64th minute for Yaya Touré, with City already 4–0 up against ten men, making his first senior appearance for the club. He recorded his first senior goal in the 88th minute, the sixth of a 7–0 win.

Pozo made his Premier League debut on 3 December 2014 against Sunderland at the Stadium of Light, coming on as an 83rd-minute substitute for Samir Nasri in a 4–1 win. On 13 December, Pozo made his first start for Manchester City, in a 1–0 away win over Leicester City. He had been promoted from the substitutes' bench after Edin Džeko was injured during warm-up.

=== Almería ===
On 31 August 2015, Pozo moved to UD Almería of his native Andalusia on a five-year contract. On 6 September he made his debut for the club, coming on as a late substitute for Eldin Hadžić in a 2–1 home win against CA Osasuna; he also scored the winner in the 88th minute.

On 2 December 2015, Pozo scored the only goal for his team in a 3–1 home loss against Celta Vigo in the Copa del Rey.

=== Rayo Vallecano ===
On 27 July 2018, Pozo signed a five-year contract with La Liga side Rayo Vallecano. He made his debut for the club on 19 August, starting in a 4–1 home loss against Sevilla FC.

On 5 January 2022, Pozo renewed his contract with Rayo until 2024, and joined Al Ahli SC on loan for the remainder of 2021–22 Qatar Stars League season.

== Career statistics ==
As of match played 21 March 2026

Appearances and goals by club, season and competition
Club	Season	League			National cup (Note: Includes Copa del Rey, Emir of Qatar Cup, Cypriot Cup, Polish Cup)		Continental		Other		Total	
Club	Season	Division	Apps	Goals	Apps	Goals	Apps	Goals	Apps	Goals	Apps	Goals
Manchester City	2014–15	Premier League	3	0	0	0	0	0	1 (Note: Appearance in Football League Cup)	1	4	1
Almería	2015–16	Segunda División	29	4	4	1	—		—		33	5
Almería	2016–17	Segunda División	36	0	0	0	—		—		36	0
Almería	2017–18	Segunda División	39	2	0	0	—		—		39	2
Almería	Total		104	6	4	1	0	0	0	0	108	7
Rayo Vallecano	2018–19	La Liga	29	3	2	0	—		—		31	3
Rayo Vallecano	2019–20	Segunda División	23	3	3	1	—		—		26	4
Rayo Vallecano	2020–21	Segunda División	33	3	2	0	—		0	0	35	3
Rayo Vallecano	2021–22	La Liga	5	0	2	1	—		0	0	7	1
Rayo Vallecano	2022–23	La Liga	8	0	1	0	—		0	0	9	0
Rayo Vallecano	2023–24	La Liga	2	0	4	0	—		0	0	6	1
Rayo Vallecano	Total		100	9	14	2	0	0	0	0	114	11
Al Ahli SC (loan)	2021–22	Qatar Stars League	9	4	1	1	—		—		10	5
Karmiotissa	2024–25	Cypriot First Division	17	2	1	0	—		—		18	2
Śląsk Wrocław	2024–25	Ekstraklasa	15	1	—		—		—		15	1
Pogoń Szczecin	2025–26	Ekstraklasa	19	2	1	0	—		—		20	2
Career total			267	24	21	4	0	0	1	1	289	29
