= Stole Dimitrievski =

North Macedonian footballer (born 1994)

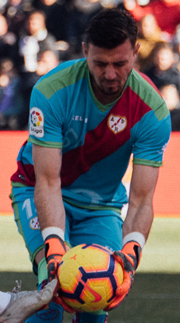
- Dimitrievski playing for Rayo Vallecano in 2019

Personal information
- Full name: Stole Dimitrievski; Столе Димитриевски
- Date of birth: 25 December 1993 (age 32)
- Place of birth: Kumanovo, Macedonia
- Height: 1.90 m (6 ft 3 in)
- Position: Goalkeeper

Team information
- Current team: Valencia
- Number: 1

Youth career
- FK Kumanovo Eurosport

Senior career*
Years	Team	Apps	(Gls)
2010–2012	Rabotnichki	18	(0)
2012–2016	Granada B	128	(0)
2012	→ Cádiz B (loan)	8	(0)
2014–2016	Granada	1	(0)
2016–2019	Gimnàstic	48	(0)
2018–2019	→ Rayo Vallecano (loan)	10	(0)
2019–2024	Rayo Vallecano	176	(0)
2024–	Valencia	24	(0)

International career^{‡}
2009–2010	Macedonia U17	4	(0)
2011	Macedonia U19	6	(0)
2012–2014	Macedonia U21	18	(0)
2015–	North Macedonia	96	(0)
- * Club domestic league appearances and goals as of 27 May 2026 (UTC) ‡ National team caps and goals as of 16 November 2026 (UTC)

Stole Dimitrievski (born 25 December 1993) is a Macedonian professional footballer who plays as a goalkeeper for La Liga club Valencia and the North Macedonia national team.

After starting off at Rabotnički in 2010, he has spent most of his career in Spain. He has made over 125 La Liga appearances for Granada, Rayo Vallecano and Valencia, as well as 108 in the Segunda División for Gimnàstic and Rayo.

Dimitrievski earned 28 caps for North Macedonia at youth level, and made his senior international debut in 2015. He represented the nation at UEFA Euro 2020, their first major tournament.

== Club career ==
=== Early career ===
Born in Kumanovo, Dimitrievski graduated from Rabotnički's youth setup. He made his debut for the club on 24 October 2010, starting in a 2–0 home win against Vardar.

Dimitrievski was Rabotnički's first-choice during the 2011–12 season, also appearing with the side in the season's UEFA Europa League. He signed a contract with Spanish club Granada in La Liga on 23 August 2011, with the deal only being effective in December.

=== Granada ===
On 30 December 2011, Dimitrievski was loaned to Cádiz. However, he only appeared with the reserves in the Tercera División and moved to another reserve team, Granada B in the summer of 2012. On 12 October 2013, he was the last of three of the team's players sent off in a 2–1 loss at Atlético Sanluqueño for the season's Segunda División B.

On 23 August 2014, after profiting from Roberto's suspension and Oier Olazábal's injury, Dimitrievski made his first team – and La Liga – debut, starting in a 2–1 home win against Deportivo La Coruña. However, his spell at the club was mainly associated with the B-side.

=== Gimnàstic ===
On 16 August 2016, Dimitrievski signed a two-year contract with Segunda División club Gimnàstic, mainly as a cover to injured Manolo Reina. He made his debut on 7 September in the second round of the Copa del Rey, a 1–0 extra-time win at home to Numancia.

After Sebastián Saja's poor run of form, Dimitrievski became a regular starter for Gimnàstic in October 2016, but his run only lasted until December as Reina returned from injury. On 13 August 2017, after the latter's departure, he extended his contract until 2020.

=== Rayo Vallecano ===
On 31 August 2018, Dimitrievski was loaned to La Liga club Rayo Vallecano for a season. Initially a backup to Alberto García, he became the club's first-choice in November.

On 31 January 2019, Dimitrievski signed a permanent three-and-a-half-year contract with the club. A year later, his deal was extended until June 2024.

Dimitrievski was the primary goalkeeper for Rayo's 2020–21 Segunda División promotion season, though Luca Zidane was in goal for the play-offs due to UEFA Euro 2020. On 2 December, in a 1–0 loss to fellow Community of Madrid team Leganés, he was sent off for insulting the referee and handed a four-match ban.

=== Valencia ===
On 12 June 2024, it was announced that from the start of July, Dimitrievski would join fellow top-tier club Valencia on a free transfer, signing a two-year deal with an option for two more years. He made his debut on 26 November in the first round of the Copa del Rey, a 1–0 win away to sixth-tier Parla Escuela. Due to an injury to first-choice keeper Giorgi Mamardashvili, he made his La Liga game for the club away to Real Valladolid on 13 December, losing 1–0 and falling to last place in the table. On 4 June 2026, Valencia announced that they had exercised the contract extension option for Stole Dimitrievski for two more seasons, meaning he will remain linked to the club until June 2028.

== International career ==
After representing Macedonia (now North Macedonia) at under-17, under-19 and under-21 levels, Dimitrievski was named in the senior squad for the first time, for the UEFA Euro 2016 qualifier to Slovakia on 14 June 2015, and made his senior international debut on 12 November 2015, starting in a 4–1 friendly win over Montenegro at the Philip II National Arena. In May 2021, he was called up for the delayed UEFA Euro 2020 finals, his country's first major international tournament. He played all three games in a group stage elimination, and saved a penalty from Ruslan Malinovskyi in a 2–1 loss to Ukraine in Bucharest.

== Career statistics ==
=== Club ===
As of match played 23 May 2026

Appearances and goals by club, season and competition
Club	Season	League			National cup		Continental		Other		Total	
Club	Season	Division	Apps	Goals	Apps	Goals	Apps	Goals	Apps	Goals	Apps	Goals
Rabotnichki	2010–11	North Macedonia first League	2	0	0	0	—		—		2	0
Rabotnichki	2011–12	North Macedonian First League	16	0	2	0	8 (Note: Appearances in UEFA Europa League)	0	—		26	0
Rabotnichki	Total		18	0	2	0	8	0	0	0	28	0
Granada B	2012–13	Tercera División	32	0	—		—		6 (Note: Appearances in Tercera División play-offs)	0	38	0
Granada B	2013–14	Segunda División B	32	0	—		—		—		32	0
Granada B	2014–15	Segunda División B	36	0	—		—		—		36	0
Granada B	2015–16	Segunda División B	28	0	—		—		—		28	0
Granada B	Total		128	0	—		—		6	0	134	0
Cádiz B (loan)	2011–12	Tercera División	8	0	—		—		—		8	0
Granada	2013–14	La Liga	0	0	0	0	—		—		0	0
Granada	2014–15	La Liga	1	0	0	0	—		—		1	0
Granada	2015–16	La Liga	0	0	0	0	—		—		0	0
Granada	Total		1	0	0	0	—		—		1	0
Gimnàstic	2016–17	Segunda División	9	0	2	0	—		—		11	0
Gimnàstic	2017–18	Segunda División	39	0	0	0	—		—		39	0
Gimnàstic	2018–19	Segunda División	0	0	0	0	—		—		0	0
Gimnàstic	Total		48	0	2	0	—		—		50	0
Rayo Vallecano (loan)	2018–19	La Liga	10	0	1	0	—		—		11	0
Rayo Vallecano	2018–19	La Liga	11	0	0	0	—		—		11	0
Rayo Vallecano	2019–20	Segunda División	32	0	0	0	—		—		32	0
Rayo Vallecano	2020–21	Segunda División	28	0	2	0	—		—		30	0
Rayo Vallecano	2021–22	La Liga	31	0	2	0	—		—		33	0
Rayo Vallecano	2022–23	La Liga	37	0	0	0	—		—		37	0
Rayo Vallecano	2023–24	La Liga	37	0	0	0	—		—		37	0
Rayo Vallecano	Rayo Vallecano total		186	0	5	0	—		—		191	0
Valencia	2024–25	La Liga	4	0	5	0	—		—		9	0
Valencia	2025–26	La Liga	20	0	4	0	—		—		24	0
Valencia	Total		24	0	9	0	—		—		33	0
Career total			419	0	18	0	8	0	6	0	451	0

=== International ===
As of match played 16 November 2026

Appearances and goals by national team and year
National team	Year	Apps	Goals
Macedonia	2015	2	0
Macedonia	2016	5	0
Macedonia	2017	9	0
Macedonia	2018	8	0
North Macedonia	2019	10	0
North Macedonia	2020	3	0
North Macedonia	2021	15	0
North Macedonia	2022	7	0
North Macedonia	2023	7	0
North Macedonia	2024	10	0
North Macedonia	2025	10	0
North Macedonia	2026	10	0
Total		96	0
