= Óscar Valentín =

Spanish footballer

Personal information
- Full name: Óscar Valentín Martín Luengo
- Date of birth: 20 August 1994 (age 32)
- Place of birth: Ajofrín, Spain
- Height: 1.78 m (5 ft 10 in)
- Position: Defensive midfielder

Team information
- Current team: Rayo Vallecano
- Number: 23

Youth career
- Atlético Casarrubuelos
- 2012–2013: Rayo Majadahonda

Senior career*
Years	Team	Apps	(Gls)
2013	Rayo Majadahonda		
2013–2014	Alcobendas	35	(5)
2014–2016	Rayo Vallecano B	17	(1)
2014–2015	→ Alcobendas (loan)	32	(2)
2016–2017	Alcobendas	34	(1)
2017–2019	Rayo Majadahonda	68	(1)
2019–	Rayo Vallecano	242	(2)
- * Club domestic league appearances and goals as of 19 October 2026

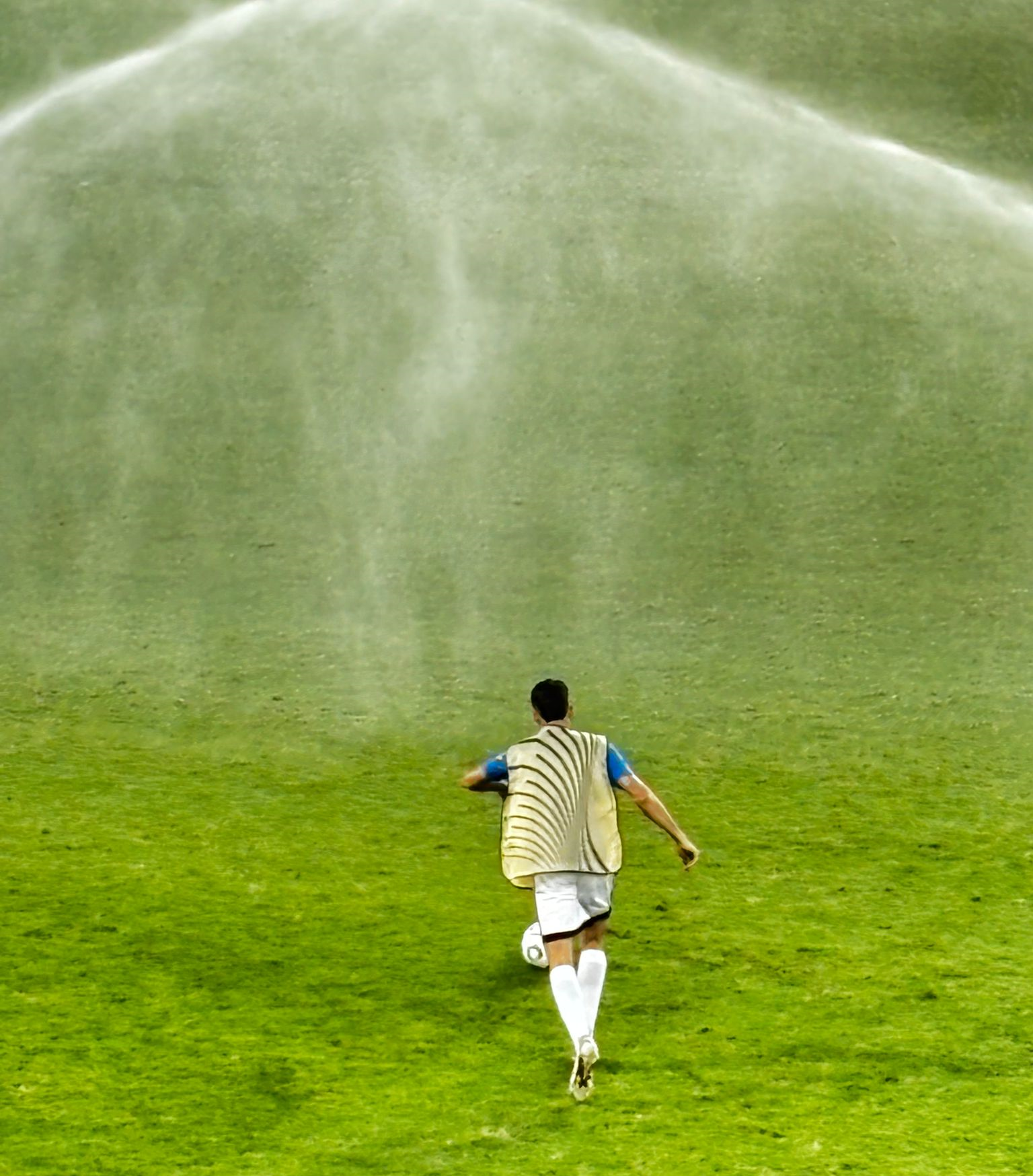
Oscar Valentín warming up in the first Conference League game

Óscar Valentín Martín Luengo (born 20 August 1994) is a Spanish professional footballer who plays as a defensive midfielder for and captains La Liga club Rayo Vallecano.

== Career ==
Born in Ajofrín, Toledo, Castile-La Mancha, Valentín finished his formation with CF Rayo Majadahonda, and made his senior debut during the 2012–13 campaign, in Tercera División. In 2013, he moved to fellow fourth division side Fútbol Alcobendas Sport.

In July 2014, Valentín joined Rayo Vallecano, and was immediately loaned back to Alcobendas. Upon returning, he was assigned to the reserves also in the fourth division.

On 23 July 2016, Valentín joined Alcobendas on a permanent basis. The following 1 July, he returned to his former club Rayo Majadahonda, now assigned to the first team in Segunda División B.

Valentín was a regular starter during the 2017–18 campaign, contributing with 33 league appearances as his side achieved promotion to Segunda División for the first time ever. He made his professional debut on 19 August 2018, starting in a 2–1 away loss against Real Zaragoza.

Valentín scored his first professional goal on 12 May 2019, but in a 3–2 home loss against Albacete Balompié. He finished the campaign as an undisputed starter, as his team was immediately relegated back.

On 25 June 2019, Valentín returned to Rayo Vallecano by signing a four-year contract. In the 2023–24 season, he became the captain of his team, in addition to scoring his first La Liga goal in a 2–2 away draw against Sevilla on 7 October 2023. He also finished that season as the player with most tackles won in La Liga in 66 occasions.

== Career statistics ==
As of match played 19 October 2026

Appearances and goals by club, season and competition
Club	Season	League			National cup		Europe		Other		Total	
Club	Season	Division	Apps	Goals	Apps	Goals	Apps	Goals	Apps	Goals	Apps	Goals
Rayo Majadahonda	2017–18	Segunda División B	33	0	1	0	—		4 (Note: Appearance(s) in Promotion Playoffs)	0	38	0
Rayo Majadahonda	2018–19	Segunda División	35	1	2	0	—		—		37	1
Rayo Majadahonda	Total		68	1	3	0	—		4	0	75	1
Rayo Vallecano	2019–20	Segunda División	29	0	4	1	—		—		33	1
Rayo Vallecano	2020–21	Segunda División	35	0	1	1	—		4	0	40	1
Rayo Vallecano	2021–22	La Liga	35	0	7	0	—		—		42	0
Rayo Vallecano	2022–23	La Liga	34	0	2	0	—		—		36	0
Rayo Vallecano	2023–24	La Liga	34	1	3	1	—		—		37	2
Rayo Vallecano	2024–25	La Liga	34	0	2	0	—		—		36	0
Rayo Vallecano	2025–26	La Liga	33	1	4	0	12 (Note: Appearance in UEFA Conference League)	0	—		49	1
Rayo Vallecano	2026–27	La Liga	8	0	0	0	—		—		8	0
Rayo Vallecano	Total		242	2	23	3	12	0	4	0	281	5
Career total			310	3	26	3	12	0	8	0	356	6

== Honours ==
Rayo Vallecano

- UEFA Conference League runner-up: 2025–26
