= Nacho Ramón =

Spanish footballer (born 1999)

Personal information
- Full name: Ignacio Ramón del Valle
- Date of birth: 30 March 1999 (age 27)
- Place of birth: Elche, Spain
- Height: 1.86 m (6 ft 1 in)
- Position: Forward

Team information
- Current team: Arenteiro
- Number: 9

Youth career
- Elche

Senior career*
Years	Team	Apps	(Gls)
2017–2022	Elche B	77	(20)
2018	Ilicitana	11	(6)
2019–2020	Elche	2	(0)
2022–2023	Eldense	9	(1)
2022–2023	→ Atlético Saguntino (loan)	27	(9)
2023–2024	Sanluqueño	30	(5)
2024–	Arenteiro	12	(1)
- * Club domestic league appearances and goals as of 10 June 2026

Ignacio "Nacho" Ramón del Valle (born 30 March 1999) is a Spanish footballer who plays as a forward for Arenteiro.

== Club career ==
Born in Elche, Valencian Community, Ramón represented Elche CF as a youth. He made his senior debut with the reserves on 7 October 2017, coming on as a second-half substitute in a 0–0 Tercera División away draw against CF Borriol.

Ahead of the 2018–19 campaign, Ramón switched between farm team UD Ilicitana in the regional leagues and the B-side in the fourth division. On 5 May 2019, he scored a hat-trick for the latter in a 6–2 home routing of Paiporta CF.

Ramón made his first-team debut on 4 June 2019, replacing Javi Flores in a 0–0 home draw against Deportivo de La Coruña in the Segunda División. On 31 January 2022, after being mainly used with the B's, he signed for Segunda División RFEF side CD Eldense.

On 30 August 2022, after helping Eldense in their promotion to Primera Federación, Ramón was loaned to Atlético Saguntino also in the fourth tier, for one year. On 30 July of the following year, he moved to Atlético Sanluqueño CF in division three.

On 16 July 2024, Ramón signed with Arenteiro in Primera Federación.
