= Sergio Camello =

Spanish footballer (born 2001)

Personal information
- Full name: Sergio Camello Pérez
- Date of birth: 10 February 2001 (age 25)
- Place of birth: Madrid, Spain
- Height: 1.77 m (5 ft 10 in)
- Position: Forward

Team information
- Current team: Rayo Vallecano
- Number: 10

Youth career
- Las Encinas
- 2009–2019: Atlético Madrid

Senior career*
Years	Team	Apps	(Gls)
2018–2021	Atlético Madrid B	55	(16)
2019–2023	Atlético Madrid	3	(1)
2021–2022	→ Mirandés (loan)	36	(15)
2022–2023	→ Rayo Vallecano (loan)	38	(6)
2023–	Rayo Vallecano	85	(18)

International career^{‡}
2017	Spain U16	2	(1)
2017–2018	Spain U17	10	(2)
2018–2019	Spain U18	6	(4)
2020	Spain U19	2	(1)
2021–2023	Spain U21	14	(0)
2024	Spain U23	2	(2)
Medal record
Men's football
Representing Spain
Olympic Games
Gold medal – first place	2024 Paris
UEFA European Under-21 Championship
Runner-up	2023 Georgia–Romania
- * Club domestic league appearances and goals as of 24 October 2026 ‡ National team caps and goals as of 9 August 2024

Sergio Camello Pérez (born 10 February 2001) is a Spanish professional footballer who plays as a forward for La Liga club Rayo Vallecano.

== Club career ==
Born in Madrid, Camello joined Atlético Madrid's youth setup in 2009, aged eight, from CDS Las Encinas de Boadilla. He made his senior debut with the reserves on 23 September 2018, coming on as a second-half substitute and scoring the equalizer in a 4–2 Segunda División B away win against CDA Navalcarnero.

On 12 May 2019, Camello scored a brace in a 2–0 away defeat of Pontevedra CF. He made his first team – and La Liga – debut six days later; after coming on as a half-time substitute for Thomas Partey, he scored the equalizer in a 2–2 away draw against Levante UD, becoming the first player born in the 21st century to score for Atleti.

On 31 August 2021, Camello moved to Segunda División side CD Mirandés on loan for the 2021–22 season. An undisputed starter, he scored 15 goals during the campaign, notably scoring braces against UD Las Palmas (4–2 win), CD Lugo (3–2 win) and SD Ponferradina (3–1 win).

On 3 August 2022, Camello renewed his contract with Atleti until 2026, and moved to fellow top tier Rayo Vallecano on loan for the season. He scored his first goal in the top tier on 3 October, netting the equalizer in a 2–1 home win over Elche CF.

On 17 August 2023, Camello signed a permanent four-year deal with Rayo.

== International career ==
In 2024, Camello was called up to the Spain Olympic team for the 2024 Olympic Games. On 9 August 2024, he scored two goals in the extra time to give Spain the 5–3 victory against France in the final, thus winning the gold medal.

== Career statistics ==
=== Club ===
As of match played 24 October 2026

Appearances and goals by club, season and competition
Club	Season	League			Copa del Rey		Continental		Other		Total	
Club	Season	Division	Apps	Goals	Apps	Goals	Apps	Goals	Apps	Goals	Apps	Goals
Atlético Madrid B	2018–19	Segunda División B	16	6	—		—		2 (Note: Appearance(s) in Segunda División B Playoffs)	0	18	6
Atlético Madrid B	2019–20	Segunda División B	16	5	—		—		1	0	17	5
Atlético Madrid B	2020–21	Segunda División B	23	5	—		—		—		23	5
Atlético Madrid B	Total		55	16	—		—		3	0	58	16
Atlético Madrid	2018–19	La Liga	1	1	0	0	—		—		1	1
Atlético Madrid	2019–20	La Liga	2	0	1	0	0	0	0	0	3	0
Atlético Madrid	2020–21	La Liga	0	0	1	0	1 (Note: Appearance in UEFA Champions League)	0	—		2	0
Atlético Madrid	Total		3	1	2	0	1	0	0	0	6	1
Mirandés (loan)	2021–22	Segunda División	36	15	1	0	—		—		37	15
Rayo Vallecano (loan)	2022–23	La Liga	38	6	3	1	—		—		41	7
Rayo Vallecano	2023–24	La Liga	31	3	2	1	—		—		33	4
Rayo Vallecano	2024–25	La Liga	23	3	2	0	—		—		25	3
Rayo Vallecano	2025–26	La Liga	22	5	4	1	13 (Note: Appearances in UEFA Conference League)	2	—		39	8
Rayo Vallecano	2026–27	La Liga	9	7	0	0	—		—		9	7
Rayo Vallecano	Rayo Vallecano total		123	24	11	3	13	2	—		147	29
Career total			217	56	14	3	14	2	3	0	248	61

== Honours ==
Rayo Vallecano

- UEFA Conference League runner-up: 2025–26

Spain U21

- UEFA European Under-21 Championship runner-up: 2023

Spain U23

- Summer Olympics gold medal: 2024
