= Víctor Rofino =

Bissau-Guinean footballer (born 2002)

Personal information
- Full name: Víctor Rofino Gordo
- Date of birth: 28 July 2002 (age 24)
- Place of birth: Madrid, Spain
- Height: 1.85 m (6 ft 1 in)
- Position: Centre-back

Team information
- Current team: Famalicão
- Number: 15

Youth career
- 2012–2013: Atlético Madrid
- 2013–2014: AFE
- 2014–2015: Atlético Madrid
- 2015–2018: Leganés
- 2018–2021: Real Madrid

Senior career*
Years	Team	Apps	(Gls)
2021–2022	Real Madrid B	0	(0)
2021–2022	→ Intercity (loan)	18	(0)
2022–2023	Valladolid B	19	(1)
2023–2024	Valladolid	1	(0)
2023–2024	→ Murcia (loan)	28	(1)
2024–2026	União de Leiria	46	(1)
2026–	Famalicão	0	(0)

International career^{‡}
2024–	Guinea-Bissau	7	(0)
- * Club domestic league appearances and goals as of 5 September 2026 ‡ National team caps and goals as of 28 July 2026

Víctor Rofino Gordo (born 28 July 2002) is a professional footballer who plays as a centre-back for Primeira Liga club Famalicão. Born in Spain, he plays for the Guinea-Bissau national team.

== Club career ==
Born in Madrid to a Bissau-Guinean father and a Spanish mother, Rofino joined Real Madrid's La Fábrica in 2018, from CD Leganés. On 10 August 2021, after finishing his formation, he moved to Segunda División RFEF side CF Intercity on loan for one year.

Rofino made his senior debut on 5 September 2021, starting in a 0–0 away draw against CD Eldense, and featured in another 17 matches during the season as the club achieved promotion to Primera Federación. On 20 August 2022, he signed a three-year contract with Real Valladolid, being initially assigned to the reserves in the fourth division.

Rofino made his first team debut on 11 August 2023, starting in a 2–0 Segunda División home win over Sporting de Gijón. On 31 August, he was loaned to third division side Real Murcia for the 2023–24 season.

On 30 July 2024, Rofino moved abroad for the first time in his career, joining Liga Portugal 2 side U.D. Leiria on a three-year contract.

== International career ==
In April 2018, Rofino was called up to the Spain national under-16 team. On 1 October 2024, he was called up to the Guinea-Bissau national team. He made his debut for the Guinea-Bissau national team on 11 October 2024 in a Africa Cup of Nations qualifier against Mali at Stade du 26 Mars. He substituted Sambinha at half-time as Mali won 1–0.

== Career statistics ==
=== International ===
As of match played 12 October 2025

Appearances and goals by national team and year
National team	Year	Apps	Goals
Guinea-Bissau	2024	4	0
Guinea-Bissau	2025	3	0
Total		7	0
