= Alfonso Espino =

Uruguayan footballer (born 1992)

Personal information
- Full name: Luis Alfonso Espino García
- Date of birth: 5 January 1992 (age 34)
- Place of birth: San Jacinto, Uruguay
- Height: 1.72 m (5 ft 8 in)
- Position: Left-back

Team information
- Current team: Racing Club
- Number: 18

Youth career
- Danubio
- Huracán Buceo
- Miramar Misiones
- Nacional Montevideo

Senior career*
Years	Team	Apps	(Gls)
2014–2019	Nacional Montevideo	128	(4)
2019–2023	Cádiz	146	(3)
2023–2026	Rayo Vallecano	77	(2)
2026–	Racing Club	3	(0)
- * Club domestic league appearances and goals as of 18:08, 8 November 2026 (UTC)

Luis Alfonso Espino García (born 5 January 1992), commonly known as Pacha Espino, is a Uruguayan professional footballer who plays as a left-back for Argentine Primera División club Racing.

== Club career ==
=== Nacional Montevideo ===
Born in San Jacinto, Espino joined Nacional Montevideo's youth setup in 2012, from Miramar Misiones. He made his senior debut on 1 February 2014, starting in a 2–0 away win against Racing Montevideo for the Uruguayan Primera División championship.

Espino scored his first senior goal on 24 April 2016, netting the game's only in a home defeat of Fénix. A regular starter, he lifted the 2014–15 and 2016 league titles with the club.

=== Cádiz ===
On 28 January 2019, Espino moved abroad for the first time in his career after agreeing to a two-and-a-half-year contract with Segunda División side Cádiz CF. He became a regular starter during the 2019–20 season, scoring once in 36 matches as the club achieved promotion to La Liga.

Espino made his top tier debut on 12 September 2020, starting in a 2–0 away loss against CA Osasuna. On 31 October, he renewed his contract until 2023.

=== Rayo Vallecano ===
On 17 July 2023, free agent Espino signed a three-year contract with Rayo Vallecano also in the Spanish first division, La Liga.

== International career ==
On 7 January 2022, Espino was named in Uruguay's 50-man preliminary squad for FIFA World Cup qualifying matches against Paraguay and Venezuela. On 21 October 2022, he was named in Uruguay's 55-man preliminary squad for the 2022 FIFA World Cup.

== Career statistics ==
=== Club ===
As of match played 27 May 2026

Appearances and goals by club, season and competition
Club	Season	League			National cup		Continental		Other		Total	
Club	Season	Division	Apps	Goals	Apps	Goals	Apps	Goals	Apps	Goals	Apps	Goals
Nacional	2013–14	Uruguayan Primera División	5	0	—		0	0	—		5	0
Nacional	2014–15	Uruguayan Primera División	22	0	—		2 (Note: Appearance(s) in Copa Libertadores)	0	—		24	0
Nacional	2015–16	Uruguayan Primera División	27	1	—		3 (Note: Appearance(s) in Copa Sudamericana)	0	—		30	1
Nacional	2016	Uruguayan Primera División	11	1	—		10	0	—		21	1
Nacional	2017	Uruguayan Primera División	33	0	—		8	0	—		41	0
Nacional	2018	Uruguayan Primera División	34	2	—		11 (Note: Six appearances in Copa Sudamericana, five appearances and one goal in Copa Libertadores)	1	1 (Note: Appearance(s) in Supercopa Uruguaya)	0	46	3
Nacional	Total		132	4	0	0	34	1	1	0	167	5
Cádiz	2018–19	Segunda División	5	0	0	0	—		—		5	0
Cádiz	2019–20	Segunda División	36	1	0	0	—		—		36	1
Cádiz	2020–21	La Liga	32	0	0	0	—		—		32	0
Cádiz	2021–22	La Liga	37	2	4	0	—		—		41	2
Cádiz	2022–23	La Liga	36	0	0	0	—		—		36	0
Cádiz	Total		146	3	4	0	0	0	0	0	150	3
Rayo Vallecano	2023–24	La Liga	31	0	2	0	—		—		33	0
Rayo Vallecano	2024–25	La Liga	16	0	3	1	—		—		19	1
Rayo Vallecano	2025–26	La Liga	30	2	2	0	12 (Note: Appearances in UEFA Conference League)	2	—		44	4
Rayo Vallecano	Total		77	2	7	1	12	2	—		66	5
Career total			355	9	11	1	46	3	1	0	413	13

== Honours ==
Rayo Vallecano

- UEFA Conference League runner-up: 2025–26
