= Diego Méndez =

Spanish footballer

Personal information
- Full name: Diego Méndez Molero
- Date of birth: 29 August 2003 (age 23)
- Place of birth: Móstoles, Spain
- Height: 1.82 m (6 ft 0 in)
- Position: Defensive midfielder

Youth career
- Rayo Vallecano

Senior career*
Years	Team	Apps	(Gls)
2021–2023	Rayo Vallecano B	60	(9)
2022–2026	Rayo Vallecano	2	(0)
2025	→ Eldense (loan)	8	(0)
- * Club domestic league appearances and goals as of 20 June 2025

Diego Méndez Molero (born 29 August 2003) is a Spanish professional footballer who plays as a defensive midfielder.

== Career ==
A youth product of Rayo Vallecano, he began his senior career with their reserves in 2021 before signing a professional contract in the summer of 2022. He made his professional debut with the senior Rayo Vallecano team in a 3–1 Copa del Rey win over CFJ Mollerussa on 13 November 2022, scoring his side's second goal in the 51st minute. He was promoted to their senior team in December 2022.

Méndez made his La Liga debut on 29 December 2022, coming on as a late substitute for Sergio Camello in a 2–2 away draw against Girona FC. In January 2024, he suffered a knee injury which sidelined him for the remainder of the season.

On 29 August 2024, Méndez extended his link with Rayo until 2028. The following 11 January, he was loaned to Segunda División side CD Eldense until June.

Upon returning, Méndez suffered another knee injury in September 2025, and spent the entire campaign sidelined before being released in July 2026.
