= 2020–21 CF Fuenlabrada season =

CF Fuenlabrada
2020–21 season
- President: Jonathan Praena
- Head coach: José Ramón Sandoval (until 2 February); José Luis Oltra (from 3 February)
- Stadium: Estadio Fernando Torres
- Segunda División: 11th
- Copa del Rey: Round of 32
- Top goalscorer: League: Randy Nteka (8); All: Randy Nteka (8)
| Home colours | Away colours | Third colours |

The 2020–21 Club de Fútbol Fuenlabrada season was the club's 46th season in existence and the club's second consecutive season in the second division of Spanish football. In addition to the domestic league, Fuenlabrada participated in this season's edition of the Copa del Rey. The season covered the period from 9 August 2020 to 30 June 2021.

== Players ==
=== First-team squad ===
As of 3 February 2021

Note: Flags indicate national team as defined under FIFA eligibility rules; some limited exceptions apply. Players may hold more than one non-FIFA nationality.

| No. | Pos. | Nation | Player |
|---|---|---|---|
| 1 | GK | ESP | Pol Freixanet |
| 2 | DF | ESP | Pol Valentín |
| 3 | DF | ESP | Antonio Glauder |
| 4 | DF | ESP | Alejandro Sotillos |
| 5 | DF | ESP | Juanma Marrero (captain) |
| 6 | FW | GEQ | Iban Salvador |
| 7 | MF | ESP | Álex Mula |
| 8 | MF | ESP | Cristóbal Márquez |
| 9 | FW | SEN | Sekou Gassama (on loan from Real Valladolid) |
| 10 | MF | FRA | Randy Nteka |
| 11 | FW | FRA | Abou Kanté |
| 13 | GK | SRB | Dragan Rosić (on loan from Almería) |

| No. | Pos. | Nation | Player |
|---|---|---|---|
| 14 | FW | ESP | Pinchi (on loan from Extremadura) |
| 15 | DF | ESP | Rubén Pulido |
| 17 | DF | ESP | Adrián Diéguez |
| 18 | MF | ARG | Franchu (on loan from Real Madrid) |
| 19 | DF | ESP | Mikel Iribas |
| 20 | MF | PER | Aldair Fuentes |
| 21 | MF | ESP | Álvaro Aguado (on loan from Real Valladolid) |
| 22 | MF | SEN | Pathé Ciss |
| 23 | MF | ESP | Jano Velasco |
| 24 | MF | ESP | Javier Espinosa |
| 28 | FW | ESP | Borja Garcés (on loan from Atlético Madrid) |
| 31 | GK | ESP | Javier Belman |

=== Reserve team ===
Note: Flags indicate national team as defined under FIFA eligibility rules; some limited exceptions apply. Players may hold more than one non-FIFA nationality.

| No. | Pos. | Nation | Player |
|---|---|---|---|
| 29 | MF | ESP | Damián |
| 30 | GK | ESP | Álvaro Ruvira |

| No. | Pos. | Nation | Player |
|---|---|---|---|
| 33 | DF | ESP | Luis Peteiro |
| 35 | MF | ESP | Guti |

=== Out on loan ===
Note: Flags indicate national team as defined under FIFA eligibility rules; some limited exceptions apply. Players may hold more than one non-FIFA nationality.

| No. | Pos. | Nation | Player |
|---|---|---|---|
| — | DF | ESP | Paco Puertas (at (Bulgaria) Etar Veliko Tarnovo until 30 June 2021) |

== Transfers ==
=== In ===
| No. | Pos | Player | Transferred from | Fee | Date | Source |
|---|---|---|---|---|---|---|
| 15 | | | TBD | | 1 July 2020 | |

=== Out ===
| No. | Pos | Player | Transferred to | Fee | Date | Source |
|---|---|---|---|---|---|---|
| 15 | | | TBD | | 1 July 2020 | |

== Pre-season and friendlies ==
Win Draw Loss

| 5 September 2020 Friendly | Rayo Vallecano | 1–0 | Fuenlabrada | Madrid, Spain |
| 19:00 CEST (UTC+2) | Qasmi 10' | Report | | Stadium: Ciudad Deportiva; Attendance: 0 |

| 9 September 2020 Friendly | Fuenlabrada | 1–2 | Getafe | Fuenlabrada, Spain |
| 20:00 CEST (UTC+2) | Juanma 22' | Report | Cucurella 54'; Mata 88' | Stadium: Estadio Fernando Torres; Attendance: 0 |

== Competitions ==
=== Overview ===
| Competition | First match | Last match | Starting round | Final position | Record | | | | | | | |
| Competition | First match | Last match | Starting round | Final position | Pld | W | D | L | GF | GA | GD | Win % |
|---|---|---|---|---|---|---|---|---|---|---|---|---|
| Segunda División | 12 September 2020 | 30 May 2021 | Matchday 1 | 11th | 42 | 12 | 18 | 12 | 45 | 46 | −1 | 28.57 |
| Copa del Rey | 16 December 2020 | 16 January 2021 | First round | Round of 32 | 3 | 1 | 2 | 0 | 4 | 3 | +1 | 33.33 |
| Total | | | | | 45 | 13 | 20 | 12 | 49 | 49 | +0 | 28.89 |

Source: Soccerway

=== Segunda División ===
==== League table ====
| Pos | Team | Pld | W | D | L | GF | GA | GD | Pts |
|---|---|---|---|---|---|---|---|---|---|
| 9 | Las Palmas | 42 | 14 | 14 | 14 | 46 | 53 | −7 | 56 |
| 10 | Mirandés | 42 | 14 | 12 | 16 | 38 | 41 | −3 | 54 (Note: Head-to-head points: Mirandés: 6, Fuenlabrada: 0) |
| 11 | Fuenlabrada | 42 | 12 | 18 | 12 | 45 | 46 | −1 | 54 |
| 12 | Málaga | 42 | 14 | 11 | 17 | 37 | 47 | −10 | 53 |
| 13 | Oviedo | 42 | 11 | 19 | 12 | 45 | 46 | −1 | 52 (Note: Head-to-head points: Oviedo: 4, Tenerife: 1) |

Source: LaLiga
Rules for classification: 1) points; 2) head-to-head points; 3) head-to-head goal difference; 4) goal difference; 5) number of goals scored

==== Results summary ====
| Overall | | | | | | | | Home | | | | | | Away | | | | | |
| Pld | W | D | L | GF | GA | GD | Pts | W | D | L | GF | GA | GD | W | D | L | GF | GA | GD |
|---|---|---|---|---|---|---|---|---|---|---|---|---|---|---|---|---|---|---|---|
| 42 | 12 | 18 | 12 | 45 | 46 | −1 | 54 | 4 | 12 | 5 | 21 | 20 | +1 | 8 | 6 | 7 | 24 | 26 | −2 |

Source: La Liga

==== Results by round ====
| Round | 1 | 2 | 3 | 4 | 5 | 6 | 7 | 8 | 9 | 10 | 11 | 12 | 13 | 14 | 15 | 16 | 17 | 18 | 19 | 20 | 21 | 22 | 23 | 24 | 25 | 26 | 27 | 28 | 29 | 30 | 31 | 32 | 33 | 34 | 35 | 36 | 37 | 38 | 39 | 40 | 41 | 42 |
|---|---|---|---|---|---|---|---|---|---|---|---|---|---|---|---|---|---|---|---|---|---|---|---|---|---|---|---|---|---|---|---|---|---|---|---|---|---|---|---|---|---|---|
| Ground | H | A | H | A | H | A | H | A | A | H | A | H | A | H | A | H | A | H | A | H | A | H | A | H | A | H | H | A | H | A | H | A | H | A | H | A | H | A | H | A | H | A |
| Result | W | D | W | W | D | D | D | L | L | D | W | D | D | D | W | L | L | L | W | D | L | D | D | D | W | D | D | D | L | W | W | L | L | D | D | W | W | L | L | L | D | W |
| Position | 2 | 4 | 3 | 3 | 3 | 3 | 2 | 7 | 10 | 10 | 6 | 7 | 9 | 10 | 8 | 10 | 11 | 13 | 10 | 10 | 14 | 13 | 13 | 13 | 10 | 11 | 12 | 12 | 14 | 12 | 12 | 12 | 12 | 13 | 13 | 12 | 9 | 11 | 12 | 14 | 13 | 11 |

Source: La Liga
A = Away; H = Home; W = Win; D = Draw; L = Loss

==== Matches ====
The league fixtures were announced on 31 August 2020.

| 13 September 2020 1 | Fuenlabrada | 2–0 | Lugo | Fuenlabrada |
| 18:15 CEST (UTC+2) | Ciss (yellow card) 1'; Awudu 64'; Nteka 70' | Report | Barreiro (yellow card) 13'; Rama (yellow card) 20'; Iriome (yellow card) 38' | Stadium: Fernando Torres; Attendance: 0 (Note: The match was played behind closed doors due to the COVID-19 pandemic in Spain.); Referee: Juan Luis Pulido Santana |

| 20 September 2020 2 | Las Palmas | 3–3 | Fuenlabrada | Las Palmas |
| 20:30 CEST (UTC+2) | Espiau (yellow card) 8'; Curbelo (yellow card) 36'; Lemos 45'; Pejiño 48', (yellow card) 49'; Loiodice (yellow card) 63'; Claudio (yellow card) 81', (goal) 90'; Araujo (yellow card) 90+3' | Report | Cristian (yellow card) 27'; Nteka 64'; Salvador (yellow card) 71', (goal) 79' (pen.); Pinchi (yellow card) 83'; Kanté 84' | Stadium: Estadio Gran Canaria; Attendance: 0 Referee: Rubén Ávalos Barrera |

| 26 September 2020 3 | Fuenlabrada | 1–0 | Albacete | Fuenlabrada |
| 20:30 CEST (UTC+2) | Cristian (yellow card) 56'; Ciss 65'; Mikel Iribas (yellow card) 90+4' | Report | Boyomo (yellow card) 23'; Ortuño (yellow card) 69'; Zozulya (yellow card) 72' | Stadium: Fernando Torres; Attendance: 0 Referee: Luis Mario Milla Alvéndiz |

| 4 October 2020 4 | Girona | 0–1 | Fuenlabrada | Girona |
| 12:00 CEST (UTC+2) | | Report | Diéguez 45' | Stadium: Montilivi; Attendance: 0 Referee: Oliver De La Fuente Ramos |

| 11 October 2020 5 | Fuenlabrada | 1–1 | Castellón | Fuenlabrada |
| 12:00 CEST (UTC+2) | | Report | | Stadium: Fernando Torres; Attendance: 0 Referee: Aitor Gorostegui Fernández-Ortega |

| 17 October 2020 6 | Cartagena | 1–1 | Fuenlabrada | Cartagena |
| 18:15 CEST (UTC+2) | | Report | | Stadium: Cartagonova; Attendance: 0 Referee: Daniel Ocón Arráiz |

| 21 October 2020 7 | Fuenlabrada | 0–0 | UD Logroñés | Fuenlabrada |
| 21:30 CEST (UTC+2) | | Report | | Stadium: Fernando Torres; Attendance: 0 Referee: Javier Iglesias Villanueva |

| 24 October 2020 8 | Almería | 3–0 | Fuenlabrada | Almería |
| 20:30 CEST (UTC+2) | | Report | | Stadium: Estadio de los Juegos Mediterráneos; Attendance: 0 Referee: Saúl Ais Reig |

| 29 October 2020 9 | Rayo Vallecano | 2–0 | Fuenlabrada | Madrid |
| 21:30 CET (UTC+1) | | Report | | Stadium: Vallecas; Attendance: 0 Referee: Juan Luis Pulido Santana |

| 1 November 2020 10 | Fuenlabrada | 1–1 | Tenerife | Fuenlabrada |
| 18:15 CET (UTC+1) | | Report | | Stadium: Fernando Torres; Attendance: 0 Referee: Rubén Ávalos Barrera |

| 8 November 2020 11 | Alcorcón | 0–3 | Fuenlabrada | Alcorcón |
| 16:00 CET (UTC+1) | | Report | | Stadium: Santo Domingo; Attendance: 0 Referee: Iosu Galech Apezteguía |

| 14 November 2020 12 | Fuenlabrada | 1–1 | Espanyol | Fuenlabrada |
| 14:00 CET (UTC+1) | Mula (yellow card) 17'; Cristóbal (yellow card) 43'; Juanma (yellow card) 75'; Ciss (yellow card) 82'; Gassama 87' (pen.) | Report | Darder (yellow card) 11'; De Tomás 25'; Miguelón (yellow card) 71' | Stadium: Fernando Torres; Attendance: 0 Referee: Eduardo Prieto Iglesias |

| 21 November 2020 13 | Oviedo | 1–1 | Fuenlabrada | Oviedo |
| 20:30 CET (UTC+1) | | Report | | Stadium: Carlos Tartiere; Attendance: 0 Referee: Dámaso Arcediano Monescillo |

| 25 November 2020 14 | Fuenlabrada | 1–1 | Ponferradina | Fuenlabrada |
| 21:30 CET (UTC+1) | | Report | | Stadium: Fernando Torres; Attendance: 0 Referee: Rafael Sánchez López |

| 28 November 2020 15 | Sabadell | 1–2 | Fuenlabrada | Sabadell |
| 16:00 CET (UTC+1) | | Report | | Stadium: Nova Creu Alta; Attendance: 0 Referee: Luis Mario Milla Alvendiz |

| 1 December 2020 16 | Fuenlabrada | 0–2 | Málaga | Fuenlabrada |
| 19:00 CET (UTC+1) | | Report | | Stadium: Fernando Torres; Attendance: 0 Referee: Iosu Galech Apezteguía |

| 6 December 2020 17 | Zaragoza | 1–0 | Fuenlabrada | Zaragoza |
| 21:00 CET (UTC+1) | Guitián (yellow card) 15'; Narváez (yellow card) 52', (goal) 60' | Report | Juanma (yellow card) 33'; Nteka (yellow card) 57' | Stadium: La Romareda; Attendance: 0 Referee: Daniel Jesús Trujillo Suárez |

| 12 December 2020 18 | Fuenlabrada | 0–1 | Mirandés | Fuenlabrada |
| 20:30 CET (UTC+1) | | Report | | Stadium: Fernando Torres; Attendance: 0 Referee: Dámaso Arcediano Monescillo |

| 19 December 2020 19 | Mallorca | 2–3 | Fuenlabrada | Palma |
| 18:15 CET (UTC+1) | Cufré 20', (yellow card) 25' (yellow-red card) 31'; Mboula (yellow card) 39'; Raíllo (yellow card) 45+5' (yellow-red card) 45+5'; Russo (yellow card) 48'; Prats 52'; De Galarreta (yellow card) 66' | Report | Sotillos (yellow card) 4'; Pulido 11'; Salvador 33'; Jano (yellow card) 56'; Damián 63'; Nteka (yellow card) 72'; Fuentes (yellow card) 89'; Valentín (yellow card) 90+5' | Stadium: Visit Mallorca Stadium; Attendance: 0 Referee: Javier Iglesias Villanueva |

| 2 January 2021 20 | Fuenlabrada | 0–0 | Leganés | Fuenlabrada |
| 14:00 CET (UTC+1) | | Report | | Stadium: Fernando Torres; Attendance: 0 Referee: Alejandro Muñiz Ruiz |

| 11 January 2021 21 | Sporting Gijón | 2–1 | Fuenlabrada | Gijón |
| 20:30 CET (UTC+1) | Đurđević 25', 53' | Report | Mula 55' | Stadium: El Molinón; Attendance: 0 Referee: Rafael Sánchez López |

| 22 January 2021 22 | Fuenlabrada | 0–0 | Alcorcón | Fuenlabrada |
| 19:00 CET (UTC+1) | | Report | | Stadium: Fernando Torres; Attendance: 0 Referee: Daniel Jesús Trujillo Suárez |

| 31 January 2021 23 | Tenerife | 1–1 | Fuenlabrada | Santa Cruz de Tenerife |
| 20:30 CET (UTC+1) | Pomares 76' | Report | Wilson 21' (o.g.) | Stadium: Heliodoro Rodríguez López; Attendance: 0 Referee: Óliver de la Fuente Ramos |

| 6 February 2021 24 | Fuenlabrada | 1–1 | Almería | Fuenlabrada |
| 20:30 CET (UTC+1) | Nteka 83' | Report | Villalba 89' | Stadium: Fernando Torres; Attendance: 0 Referee: Gorka Sagués Oscoz |

| 15 February 2021 25 | Castellón | 1–2 | Fuenlabrada | Castellón de la Plana |
| 19:00 CET (UTC+1) | Bodiger 37' (pen.) | Report | Mula 8'; Nteka 42' (pen.) | Stadium: Nou Estadi Castàlia; Attendance: 0 Referee: Alejandro Muñiz Ruiz |

| 22 February 2021 26 | Fuenlabrada | 2–2 | Oviedo | Fuenlabrada |
| 19:00 CET (UTC+1) | Diéguez 69'; Garcés 87' | Report | Sangalli 14'; Pulido 86' (o.g.) | Stadium: Fernando Torres; Attendance: 0 Referee: Iosu Galech Apezteguía |

| 28 February 2021 27 | Fuenlabrada | 1–1 | Girona | Fuenlabrada |
| 14:00 CET (UTC+1) | Nteka 70' | Report | Stuani 9' (pen.) | Stadium: Fernando Torres; Attendance: 0 Referee: José Antonio López Toca |

| 8 March 2021 28 | Lugo | 0–0 | Fuenlabrada | Lugo |
| 21:00 CET (UTC+1) | | Report | | Stadium: Estadio Anxo Carro; Attendance: 0 Referee: Daniel Ocón Arráiz |

| 13 March 2021 29 | Fuenlabrada | 1–2 | Las Palmas | Fuenlabrada |
| 16:00 CET (UTC+1) | Garcés 2' | Report | Pejiño 35', 71' | Stadium: Fernando Torres; Attendance: 0 Referee: Iñaki Vicandi Garrido |

| 20 March 2021 30 | Leganés | 0–2 | Fuenlabrada | Leganés |
| 20:30 CET (UTC+1) | | Report | Cristóbal 54'; Pulido 77' | Stadium: Butarque; Attendance: 0 Referee: Francisco José Hernández Maeso |

| 29 March 2021 31 | Fuenlabrada | 4–1 | Mallorca | Fuenlabrada |
| 21:00 CEST (UTC+2) | Pinchi 13', 38'; Garcés (yellow card) 17'; Nteka 41' (pen.); Ciss 73', (yellow card) 90+2'; Cristóbal (yellow card) 75' | Report | Mboula 56'; Cufré (yellow card) 71' | Stadium: Fernando Torres; Attendance: 0 Referee: Dámaso Arcediano Monescillo |

| 1 April 2021 32 | Espanyol | 4–0 | Fuenlabrada | Cornellà de Llobregat |
| 17:00 CEST (UTC+2) | De Tomás 18' (pen.), 65'; Embarba 29'; Cabrera (yellow card) 33'; Pulido 41' (o.g.); Mérida (yellow card) 77' | Report | Nteka (red card) 17'; Iribas (yellow card) 33'; Garcés (yellow card) 45+2'; Valentín (yellow card) 79'; Salvador (yellow card) 87' | Stadium: RCDE Stadium; Attendance: 0 Referee: Iosu Galech Apezteguía |

| 5 April 2021 33 | Fuenlabrada | 0–1 | Zaragoza | Fuenlabrada |
| 21:00 CEST (UTC+2) | Salvador (penalty missed) 20'; Juanma (yellow card) 45+1'; Jano (yellow card) 49' | Report | Jair (yellow card) 19'; Tejero 86' (pen.) | Stadium: Fernando Torres; Attendance: 0 Referee: Saúl Ais Reig |

| 10 April 2021 34 | Ponferradina | 0–0 | Fuenlabrada | Ponferrada |
| 14:00 CEST (UTC+2) | | Report | | Stadium: Estadio El Toralín; Attendance: 0 Referee: Rubén Ávalos Barrera |

| 16 April 2021 35 | Fuenlabrada | 2–2 | Sabadell | Fuenlabrada |
| 19:00 CEST (UTC+2) | Garcés 49'; Nteka 67' | Report | Ozkoidi 17'; Cristóbal 70' (o.g.) | Stadium: Fernando Torres; Attendance: 0 Referee: Jon Ander González Esteban |

| 24 April 2021 36 | Málaga | 0–1 | Fuenlabrada | Málaga |
| 16:00 CEST (UTC+2) | | Report | Nteka 11' (pen.) | Stadium: La Rosaleda; Attendance: 0 Referee: Javier Iglesias Villanueva |

| 2 May 2021 37 | Fuenlabrada | 2–1 | Cartagena | Fuenlabrada |
| 14:00 CEST (UTC+2) | Garcés 14'; Rosić (red card) 45+3'; Ciss 48', (yellow card) 75'; Salvador (red card) 67' | Report | Zorrilla (yellow card) 52'; Castro 77' | Stadium: Fernando Torres; Attendance: 0 Referee: Alejandro Muñíz Ruiz |

| 9 May 2021 38 | Mirandés | 2–1 | Fuenlabrada | Miranda de Ebro |
| 14:00 CEST (UTC+2) | Muñoz 34'; Caballero (yellow card) 49'; Djouahra 66'; Vivian (penalty missed) 76'; Barco (yellow card) 90+1'; Martínez (yellow card) 90+6' | Report | Kanté 26', (yellow card) 90+2'; Diéguez (yellow card) 44'; Pulido (yellow card) 74'; Nteka (yellow card) 90+6' | Stadium: Estadio Municipal de Anduva; Attendance: 0 Referee: Eduardo Prieto Iglesias |

| 16 May 2021 39 | Fuenlabrada | 1–2 | Rayo Vallecano | Fuenlabrada |
| 16:00 CEST (UTC+2) | Ciss (yellow card) 14' (yellow-red card) 45+7'; Iribas (yellow card) 18'; Nteka (red card) 23'; Kanté 55'; Diéguez (yellow card) 73'; Salvador (yellow card) 90+5'; Juanma (yellow card) 90+6' | Report | Isi 19' (pen.); Comesaña (yellow card) 35'; Trejo 45+5' (pen.); Qasmi (yellow card) 59' | Stadium: Fernando Torres; Attendance: 0 Referee: Luis Mario Milla Alvendiz |

| 19 May 2021 40 | UD Logroñés | 1–0 | Fuenlabrada | Logroño |
| 19:00 CEST (UTC+2) | Paulino (yellow card) 45+4'; Andy (yellow card) 53', (goal) 75'; González (yellow card) 60'; Iñaki (yellow card) 82' | Report | Fuentes (yellow card) 55' | Stadium: Las Gaunas; Attendance: 0 Referee: Gorka Sagués Oscoz |

| 24 May 2021 41 | Fuenlabrada | 0–0 | Sporting Gijón | Fuenlabrada |
| 21:00 CEST (UTC+2) | Salvador (yellow card) 28'; Diéguez (yellow card) 90+2' | Report | A. García (yellow card) 44'; M. García (yellow card) 71' | Stadium: Fernando Torres; Attendance: 0 Referee: Jon Ander González Esteban |

| 30 May 2021 42 | Albacete | 1–2 | Fuenlabrada | Albacete |
| 18:30 CEST (UTC+2) | Gómez 67' | Report | Garcés 44', 60'; Juanma (yellow card) 59'; Diéguez (yellow card) 85'; Rosić (yellow card) 90+3' | Stadium: Carlos Belmonte; Attendance: 0 Referee: Aitor Gorostegui Fernández-Ortega |

=== Copa del Rey ===
| 16 December 2020 First round | Atlético Baleares | 0–1 | Fuenlabrada | Palma |
| 19:00 CET (UTC+1) | | Report | Awudu 64' | Stadium: Balear; Referee: Rubén Ávalos Barrera |

| 6 January 2021 Second round | Fuenlabrada | 2–2 (a.e.t.) (7–6 p) | Mallorca | Fuenlabrada |
| 21:00 CET (UTC+1) | Diéguez 55'; Gonzalez 100' (o.g.) | Report | Trajkovski 11'; Abdón 115' | Stadium: Fernando Torres; Referee: Luis Mario Milla Alvendiz |
| | Penalties |
| | Mula (penalty scored); Kanté (penalty scored); Nteka (penalty scored); Franchu (penalty missed); Diéguez (penalty scored); Ciss (penalty scored); Sotillos (penalty scored); Glauder (penalty scored) | | (penalty scored) Sevilla; (penalty scored) Junior; (penalty scored) Murilo; (penalty scored) Abdón; (penalty missed) Cufré; (penalty scored) Gámez; (penalty scored) Russo; (penalty missed) Sánchez |

| 16 January 2021 Round of 32 | Fuenlabrada | 1–1 (a.e.t.) (2–4 p) | Levante | Las Rozas (Note: Given the impossibility of being able to play the match at the Fernando Torres stadium in Fuenlabrada due to the consequences of the “Filomena” storm.) |
| 18:00 CET (UTC+1) | Diéguez (yellow card) 7'; Salvador (yellow card) 47'; Glauder (yellow card) 59'; Garcés 68' | Report | Toño (yellow card) 12'; Glauder 19' (o.g.); Duarte (yellow card) 33'; Vukčević (yellow card) 47'; Gómez (yellow card) 97'; Malsa (yellow card) 103' | Stadium: La Ciudad del Fútbol; Referee: Santiago Jaime Latre |
| | Penalties |
| | Iribas (penalty scored); Pinchi (penalty scored); Garcés (penalty missed); Cristóbal (penalty missed) | | (penalty scored) Roger; (penalty scored) Melero; (penalty scored) León; (penalty scored) Duarte |
