= 2019–20 CF Fuenlabrada season =

CF Fuenlabrada
2019–20 season
- President: Jonathan Praena
- Head coach: José Ramón Sandoval
- Stadium: Estadio Fernando Torres
- Segunda División: 8th
- Copa del Rey: Second round
- Top goalscorer: League: Hugo Fraile (13 goals); All: Hugo Fraile (13 goals)
Home colours	Away colours	Third colours

The 2019–20 season was Club de Fútbol Fuenlabrada's 45th season in existence and the club's first season in the second division of Spanish football. In addition to the domestic league, Fuenlabrada participated in this season's edition of the Copa del Rey. The season was slated to cover a period from 1 July 2019 to 30 June 2020. It was extended extraordinarily beyond 30 June due to the COVID-19 pandemic in Spain.

== Players ==
=== Current squad ===
As of 19 June 2020

Note: Flags indicate national team as defined under FIFA eligibility rules; some limited exceptions apply. Players may hold more than one non-FIFA nationality.

No.	Pos.	Nation	Player
3	DF	ESP	Antonio Glauder
4	DF	ESP	David Prieto
5	DF	ESP	Juanma Marrero
6	FW	EQG	Iban Salvador
7	FW	ESP	Hugo Fraile
8	MF	ESP	Cristóbal Márquez
9	FW	PER	Jeisson Martínez
10	MF	FRA	Randy Nteka
11	FW	SEN	Sekou Gassama (on loan from Real Valladolid)
13	GK	ESP	Pol Freixanet
14	MF	ESP	Pablo Clavería
15	DF	ESP	Chico Flores

No.	Pos.	Nation	Player
17	MF	ESP	José Rodríguez (on loan from Málaga)
18	DF	ESP	José León
19	DF	ESP	Mikel Iribas
20	FW	ANG	Anderson Emanuel (on loan from Alavés)
21	FW	ESP	Oriol Riera
22	MF	SEN	Pathé Ciss (on loan from União Madeira)
23	MF	ESP	José Fran
24	FW	ESP	Caye Quintana (on loan from Cádiz)
26	DF	ESP	Alejandro Sotillos
27	DF	ESP	Dani Fernández
28	MF	ESP	Alberto Fernández (on loan from Real Madrid)
32	GK	ESP	Joan Femenías

=== Out on loan ===
Note: Flags indicate national team as defined under FIFA eligibility rules; some limited exceptions apply. Players may hold more than one non-FIFA nationality.

No.	Pos.	Nation	Player
—	DF	MLI	Souley (at San Sebastián de los Reyes until 30 June 2020)
—	MF	ESP	Javi Gómez (at Celta B until 30 June 2020)
—	FW	ESP	Jorge Borona (at Navalcarnero until 30 June 2020)

== Competitions ==
=== Overview ===
Competition	First match	Last match	Starting round	Final position	Record							
Competition	First match	Last match	Starting round	Final position	Pld	W	D	L	GF	GA	GD	Win %
Segunda División	18 August 2019	7 August 2020	Matchday 1	8th	42	15	15	12	47	40	+7	35.71
Copa del Rey	17 December 2019	11 January 2020	First round	Second round	2	1	1	0	1	0	+1	50.00
Total					44	16	16	12	48	40	+8	36.36

Source: Competitions

=== Segunda División ===
==== League table ====
Pos	Team	Pld	W	D	L	GF	GA	GD	Pts	Promotion, qualification or relegation
6	Elche (O, P)	42	16	13	13	52	44	+8	61	Qualification to promotion play-offs
7	Rayo Vallecano	42	13	21	8	60	50	+10	60 (Note: Rayo Vallecano finished ahead of Fuenlabrada on head-to-head points: Fuenlabrada 2–2 Rayo Vallecano, Rayo Vallecano 1–0 Fuenlabrada.)	
8	Fuenlabrada	42	15	15	12	47	40	+7	60	
9	Las Palmas	42	14	15	13	49	46	+3	57	
10	Alcorcón	42	13	18	11	52	50	+2	57	

Source: LaLiga Soccerway
Rules for classification: 1) points; 2) head-to-head points; 3) head-to-head goal difference; 4) goal difference; 5) number of goals scored
(O) Play-off winners; (P) Promoted

==== Results summary ====
Overall								Home						Away					
Pld	W	D	L	GF	GA	GD	Pts	W	D	L	GF	GA	GD	W	D	L	GF	GA	GD
42	15	15	12	47	40	+7	60	9	8	4	29	21	+8	6	7	8	18	19	−1

Source: La Liga SmartBank

==== Results by round ====
Round	1	2	3	4	5	6	7	8	9	10	11	12	13	14	15	16	17	18	19	20	21	22	23	24	25	26	27	28	29	30	31	32	33	34	35	36	37	38	39	40	41	42
Ground	A	H	A	H	A	H	A	H	A	H	H	A	H	A	H	A	H	A	H	A	H	A	H	A	H	A	A	H	A	H	H	A	H	A	H	A	H	A	H	A	H	A
Result	W	W	W	D	L	W	W	D	L	W	L	L	W	D	D	W	L	W	D	D	D	D	D	D	L	L	D	L	D	L	L	W	L	W	D	D	W	D	W	W	W	L
Position	3	1	2	4	4	5	4	5	5	4	6	3	3	3	4	2	4	4	4	4	4	5	5	5	5	8	7	9	8	10	13	10	12	12	11	11	10	10	9	7	6	8

Source: La Liga SmartBank
A = Away; H = Home; W = Win; D = Draw; L = Loss

==== Matches ====
The fixtures were revealed on 4 July 2019.

17 August 2019 1	Elche	0–2	Fuenlabrada	Elche
20:00 CEST (UTC+2)		Report		Stadium: Martínez Valero

25 August 2019 2	Extremadura	1–2	Fuenlabrada	Almendralejo
21:00 CEST (UTC+2)		Report		Stadium: Ciudad de Almendralejo

31 August 2019 3	Fuenlabrada	2–1	Oviedo	Fuenlabrada
18:00 CEST (UTC+2)		Report		Stadium: Fernando Torres

7 September 2019 4	Fuenlabrada	1–1	Ponferradina	Fuenlabrada
20:00 CEST (UTC+2)		Report		Stadium: Fernando Torres

15 September 2019 5	Lugo	2–0	Fuenlabrada	Lugo
20:00 CEST (UTC+2)		Report		Stadium: Anxo Carro

22 September 2019 7	Tenerife	0–1	Fuenlabrada	Santa Cruz de Tenerife
20:00 CEST (UTC+2)		Report		Stadium: Heliodoro Rodríguez López

28 September 2019 8	Fuenlabrada	2–2	Rayo Vallecano	Fuenlabrada
16:00 CEST (UTC+2)		Report		Stadium: Fernando Torres

1 October 2019 9	Numancia	1–0	Fuenlabrada	Soria
19:00 CEST (UTC+2)		Report		Stadium: Los Pajaritos

6 October 2019 10	Fuenlabrada	2–0	Sporting Gijón	Fuenlabrada
12:00 CEST (UTC+2)		Report		Stadium: Fernando Torres

13 October 2019 11	Mirandés	2–1	Fuenlabrada	Miranda de Ebro
12:00 CEST (UTC+2)		Report		Stadium: Anduva

16 October 2019 6	Fuenlabrada	2–1	Zaragoza	Fuenlabrada
21:00 CEST (UTC+2)	Fraile 35'; Salvador 67'; Clavería (yellow card) 82'; Martínez (yellow card) 90'; Chico (yellow card) 90+6'	Report	Papu (yellow card) 25'; Grippo (yellow card) 34'; Ros 61' (pen.); Álvarez (yellow card) 88'; Pombo (yellow card) 90+2'; Atienza (yellow card) 90+5'	Stadium: Fernando Torres; Attendance: 5,214; Referee: Luis Mario Milla Alvendiz

20 October 2019 12	Fuenlabrada	0–1	Albacete	Fuenlabrada
12:00 CEST (UTC+2)		Report		Stadium: Fernando Torres

27 October 2019 13	Las Palmas	1–3	Fuenlabrada	Las Palmas
18:00 CET (UTC+1)		Report		Stadium: Gran Canaria

2 November 2019 14	Fuenlabrada	1–1	Deportivo La Coruña	Fuenlabrada
16:00 CET (UTC+1)		Report		Stadium: Fernando Torres

10 November 2019 15	Málaga	0–0	Fuenlabrada	Málaga
18:00 CET (UTC+1)		Report		Stadium: La Rosaleda

16 November 2019 16	Fuenlabrada	3–2	Huesca	Fuenlabrada
13:00 CET (UTC+1)		Report		Stadium: Fernando Torres

24 November 2019 17	Girona	2–0	Fuenlabrada	Girona
18:00 CET (UTC+1)		Report		Stadium: Montilivi

1 December 2019 18	Fuenlabrada	1–0	Cádiz	Fuenlabrada
12:00 CET (UTC+1)	Jeisson 80'	Report		Stadium: Fernando Torres; Attendance: 5,282; Referee: Saúl Ais Reig

6 December 2019 19	Racing Santander	2–2	Fuenlabrada	Santander
16:00 CET (UTC+1)	Juanma 8' (o.g.); Cejudo 52'	Report	Glauder 78'; Juanma 84'	Stadium: El Sardinero; Attendance: 12,075; Referee: Jon Ander González Esteban

15 December 2019 20	Fuenlabrada	2–2	Almería	Fuenlabrada
20:00 CET (UTC+1)		Report		Stadium: Fernando Torres

22 December 2019 21	Alcorcón	1–1	Fuenlabrada	Alcorcón
18:00 CET (UTC+1)		Report		Stadium: Santo Domingo

4 January 2020 22	Fuenlabrada	0–0	Las Palmas	Fuenlabrada
13:00 CET (UTC+1)		Report		Stadium: Fernando Torres

14 January 2020 23	Albacete	1–1	Fuenlabrada	Albacete
19:00 CET (UTC+1)		Report		Stadium: Carlos Belmonte

17 January 2020 24	Fuenlabrada	0–0	Málaga	Fuenlabrada
21:00 CET (UTC+1)		Report		Stadium: Fernando Torres

25 January 2020 25	Sporting Gijón	1–0	Fuenlabrada	Gijón
16:00 CET (UTC+1)		Report		Stadium: El Molinón

2 February 2020 26	Fuenlabrada	0–1	Girona	Fuenlabrada
12:00 CET (UTC+1)		Report		Stadium: Fernando Torres

8 February 2020 27	Zaragoza	0–0	Fuenlabrada	Zaragoza
21:00 CET (UTC+1)	El Yamiq (yellow card) 60'; Blanco (yellow card) 67'; Soro (yellow card) 88'	Report	José Fran (yellow card) 68'; Quintana (yellow card) 76'; Iribas (yellow card) 90+2'	Stadium: La Romareda; Attendance: 23,344; Referee: Rubén Ávalos Barrera

16 February 2020 28	Fuenlabrada	0–1	Lugo	Fuenlabrada
12:00 CET (UTC+1)		Report		Stadium: Fernando Torres

22 February 2020 29	Almería	0–0	Fuenlabrada	Almería
16:00 CET (UTC+1)		Report		Stadium: Juegos Mediterráneos; Attendance: 9,539; Referee: Iñaki Vicandi Garrido

1 March 2020 30	Fuenlabrada	3–4	Alcorcón	Fuenlabrada
CET (UTC+1)	Juanma 37'; Salvador 70'; Fraile 77' (pen.)	Report	Perea 28', 43'; Stoichkov 30'; Arribas 90+4'	Stadium: Fernando Torres; Attendance: 5,012; Referee: Javier Iglesias Villanueva

7 March 2020 31	Huesca	2–0	Fuenlabrada	Huesca
18:15 CET (UTC+1)		Report		Stadium: El Alcoraz; Attendance: 6,186; Referee: Santiago Varón Aceitón

12 June 2020 32	Fuenlabrada	1–0	Tenerife	Fuenlabrada
19:30 CEST (UTC+2)	Gassama 45'	Report		Stadium: Fernando Torres; Attendance: 0 Referee: Isidro Díaz de Mera Escuderos

17 June 2020 33	Rayo Vallecano	1–0	Fuenlabrada	Madrid
21:45 CEST (UTC+2)		Report		Stadium: Vallecas

21 June 2020 34	Fuenlabrada	2–0	Numancia	Fuenlabrada
21:45 CEST (UTC+2)		Report		Stadium: Fernando Torres

25 June 2020 35	Oviedo	0–0	Fuenlabrada	Oviedo
21:45 CEST (UTC+2)		Report		Stadium: Carlos Tartiere

28 June 2020 36	Fuenlabrada	1–1	Extremadura	Fuenlabrada
21:45 CEST (UTC+2)		Report		Stadium: Fernando Torres

1 July 2020 37	Ponferradina	0–3	Fuenlabrada	Ponferrada
21:45 CEST (UTC+2)	Ivi (yellow card) 51'; Valcarce (yellow card) 56'; Sielva (yellow card) 69'	Report	Fernández (yellow card) 34'; Martínez 57'; Nteka 60'; León (yellow card) 64'; Salvador (yellow card) 87'; Ciss 87'	Stadium: El Toralín; Attendance: 0 Referee: Alejandro Muñiz Ruiz

4 July 2020 38	Fuenlabrada	2–2	Mirandés	Fuenlabrada
21:45 CEST (UTC+2)	Ciss (yellow card) 13' (yellow-red card) 21'; Iribas (yellow card) 27'; Fraile 71' (pen.); Chico (yellow card) 87'; Emanuel 90+1'; Martínez (yellow card) 90+5'	Report	Merquelanz 63'; González (yellow card) 70'; Matheus 77' (pen.)	Stadium: Fernando Torres; Attendance: 0 Referee: Rubén Ávalos Barrera

7 July 2020 39	Fuenlabrada	1–0	Racing Santander	Fuenlabrada
20:30 CEST (UTC+2)	Riera 63'; Cristóbal (yellow card) 87'	Report	Camus (yellow card) 28'; Cejudo (yellow card) 90+5'	Stadium: Fernando Torres; Attendance: 0 Referee: Luis Mario Milla Alvendiz

11 July 2020 40	Cádiz	0–1	Fuenlabrada	Cádiz
21:45 CEST (UTC+2)		Report	Fraile 50' (pen.)	Stadium: Ramón de Carranza; Attendance: 0 Referee: Juan Luis Pulido Santana

17 July 2020 41	Fuenlabrada	3–1	Elche	Fuenlabrada
21:00 CEST (UTC+2)	Cristóbal (yellow card) 25'; Nteka (yellow card) 37'; Ciss (yellow card) 41'; Martínez 47'; Fraile 51' (pen.); José Fran (yellow card) 90+3'; Rodríguez 90+4'	Report	Manuel (yellow card) 37'; Tekio (yellow card) 44'; Jonathas 75' (pen.), (yellow card) 89'; Sánchez (yellow card) 90+1'; Gonzalo (yellow card) 90+3'	Stadium: Fernando Torres; Attendance: 0 Referee: Jorge Figueroa Vázquez

7 August 2020 42	Deportivo La Coruña	2–1	Fuenlabrada	A Coruña
20:00 CEST (UTC+2)	Aketxe (yellow card) 2'; Valle (yellow card) 39'; Beauvue 84', 90+5' (pen.)	Report	Ciss 11'; Nteka (yellow card) 42'	Stadium: Abanca-Riazor; Attendance: 0 Referee: Isidro Díaz de Mera Escuderos

=== Copa del Rey ===
17 December 2019 First round	Peña Sport	0–1 (a.e.t.)	Fuenlabrada	Tafalla
20:00 CET (UTC+1)		Report	Héctor 119'	Stadium: San Francisco; Attendance: 800; Referee: Iñaki Bikandi Garrido

11 January 2020 Second round	Recreativo	0–0 (a.e.t.) (5–4 p)	Fuenlabrada	Huelva
19:00 CET (UTC+1)		Report		Stadium: Nuevo Colombino; Attendance: 5,500; Referee: Juan Luis Pulido Santana
	Penalties
	Rivero (penalty scored); Morcillo (penalty scored); Nano (penalty scored); Martínez (penalty scored); Vergé (penalty scored)		(penalty scored) Riera; (penalty scored) Ciss; (penalty missed) A. Fernández; (penalty scored) León; (penalty scored) D. Fernández
