= Rubén Pulido =

Rubén Pulido may refer to:

- Rubén Pulido (footballer, born 1979), Spanish retired football centre-back
- Rubén Pulido (footballer, born 2000), Spanish football centre-back for Fuenlabrada
