= Borja Garcés =

Spanish footballer (born 1999)

Personal information
- Full name: Borja Garcés Moreno
- Date of birth: 6 August 1999 (age 27)
- Place of birth: Melilla, Spain
- Height: 1.83 m (6 ft 0 in)
- Position: Forward

Youth career
- Gimnástico Melilla
- 2015–2016: Rusadir
- 2016–2018: Atlético Madrid

Senior career*
Years	Team	Apps	(Gls)
2018–2025	Atlético Madrid B	50	(7)
2018	Atlético Madrid	1	(1)
2021	→ Fuenlabrada (loan)	21	(6)
2021–2022	→ Leganés (loan)	28	(5)
2022–2023	→ Tenerife (loan)	36	(4)
2023–2024	→ Elche (loan)	25	(1)
2025–2026	Kustošija	15	(6)
- * Club domestic league appearances and goals as of 10:25, 4 May 2026 (UTC)

Borja Garcés Moreno (born 6 August 1999) is a Spanish professional footballer who plays as a forward.

== Career ==
Born in Melilla, Garcés joined Atlético Madrid's youth setup in 2016, from hometown club CF Rusadir. He made his unofficial debut for the first team on 22 May 2018, scoring the winner in a 3–2 victory over Nigeria A'.

Garcés renewed his contract on 4 July 2018 until 2021, being promoted to the reserves in the Segunda División B. After spending the whole pre-season with the first team, he made his senior debut with the B's on 9 September, playing the last 27 minutes in a 1–1 away draw against Unionistas de Salamanca CF.

On 14 September 2018, Garcés was named in Diego Simeone's squad ahead of a home fixture against SD Eibar, replacing the injured Nikola Kalinić. He played his first La Liga match the following day; after coming on as a second-half substitute for Rodri, he scored a last-minute equaliser to give the hosts a 1–1 home draw.

In March 2019, Garcés suffered a serious knee injury which kept him out for six months. On 15 January 2021, he was loaned to Segunda División side CF Fuenlabrada for the remainder of the season. He scored his first goal as a professional in a 2–2 home draw with Real Oviedo on 22 February, adding a brace in the last matchday to help defeat Albacete Balompié 2–1 away.

On 12 August 2021, Garcés moved to CD Leganés of the same league on a one-year loan. In October, after he chose to attend the wedding of his brother even though he did not have the club's express permission, manager Asier Garitano said that the player would not appear in any further games for the team as long as he was in charge.

On 20 July 2022, Garcés joined fellow second-tier CD Tenerife on loan. In September 2023, he moved to Elche CF also in that division and in a temporary deal.

Back at Atlético in July 2024, Garcés spent the first half of the campaign nursing another knee injury, and was registered again by the reserves in the Primera Federación the following January. In September 2025, having become a free agent, he signed with Croatian Second Football League club NK Kustošija.

== Career statistics ==
As of match played 8 February 2026

Appearances and goals by club, season and competition
Club	Season	League			National cup		Continental		Other		Total	
Club	Season	Division	Apps	Goals	Apps	Goals	Apps	Goals	Apps	Goals	Apps	Goals
Atlético Madrid B	2018–19	Segunda División B	19	4	—		—		—		19	4
Atlético Madrid B	2019–20	Segunda División B	13	1	—		—		1 (Note: Appearance in Segunda División B play-offs)	0	14	1
Atlético Madrid B	2020–21	Segunda División B	7	2	—		—		—		7	2
Atlético Madrid B	Total		39	7	0	0	0	0	1	0	40	7
Atlético Madrid	2018–19	La Liga	1	1	0	0	0	0	—		1	1
Fuenlabrada (loan)	2020–21	Segunda División	21	6	1	1	—		—		22	7
Leganés (loan)	2021–22	Segunda División	28	5	2	0	—		—		30	5
Tenerife (loan)	2022–23	Segunda División	36	4	2	0	—		—		38	4
Elche (loan)	2023–24	Segunda División	25	1	2	1	—		—		27	2
Atlético Madrid B	2024–25	Primera Federación	11	0	—		—		—		11	0
Kustošija	2025–26	Second Football League	3	5	—	—	—		—		3	5
Career total			164	29	7	2	0	0	1	0	172	31
