= 2019 Segunda División B play-offs =

Spanish football league play-offs

The 2019 Segunda División B play-offs (Playoffs de Ascenso or Promoción de Ascenso) are the final playoffs for promotion from 2018–19 Segunda División B to the 2019–20 Segunda División. The four first placed teams in each one of the four qualify for the promotion playoffs and the four last placed teams in Segunda División are relegated to Segunda División B. It also decides the teams which placed 16th to be relegated to the 2019–20 Tercera División.

== Format ==
The four group winners have the opportunity to promote directly and become the overall Segunda División B champion. The four group winners will be drawn into a two-legged series where the two winners will be promoted to the Segunda División and will enter into the final for the Segunda División B champion. The two losing semifinalists will enter the playoff round for the last two promotion spots.

The four group runners-up will be drawn against one of the three fourth-placed teams outside their group while the four third-placed teams will be drawn against each other in a two-legged series. The six winners will advance with the two losing semifinalists to determine the four teams that will enter the last two-legged series for the last two promotion spots. In all the playoff series, the lower-ranked club will play at home first. Whenever there is a tie in position (e.g. like the group winners in the Semifinal Round and Final or the third-placed teams in the first round), a draw will determine the club to play at home first.

== Group Winners promotion play-off ==
=== Qualified teams ===
| Group | Team |
|---|---|
| 1 | Fuenlabrada |
| 2 | Racing Santander |
| 3 | Atlético Baleares |
| 4 | Recreativo |

=== Bracket ===
Semifinals
Racing Santander (a) | 0 | 1 | 1
Atlético Baleares | 0 | 1 | 1
Fuenlabrada | 3 | 1 | 4
Recreativo | 0 | 1 | 1

Finals
Racing Santander | 1 | 0 | 1
Fuenlabrada | 2 | 0 | 2

=== Matches ===
==== Semifinals ====
| Team 1 | Agg. | Team 2 | 1st leg | 2nd leg |
|---|---|---|---|---|
| Racing Santander | 1–1 (a) | Atlético Baleares | 0–0 | 1–1 |
| Fuenlabrada | 4–1 | Recreativo | 3–0 | 1–1 |

===== First leg =====
| 26 May 2019 | Fuenlabrada | 3–0 | Recreativo | Fuenlabrada |
| 12:00 (CEST) | Hugo Fraile 61'; José Fran 68'; Randy 88' | | | Stadium: Fernando Torres; Referee: González Francés |

| 26 May 2019 | Racing Santander | 0–0 | Atlético Baleares | Santander |
| 18:30 (CEST) | | Report | | Stadium: El Sardinero; Attendance: 21,487; Referee: Galech Apezteguía |

===== Second leg =====
| 2 June 2019 | Atlético Baleares | 1–1 (1–1 (a) agg.) | Racing Santander | Palma |
| 12:00 (CEST) | Fullana 41' (pen.) | | Buñuel 66' | Stadium: Son Malferit; Referee: Gálvez Rascón |

| 2 June 2019 | Recreativo | 1–1 (1–4 agg.) | Fuenlabrada | Huelva |
| 18:30 (CEST) | Caye Quintana 92' | | Juanma 45+1' | Stadium: Nuevo Colombino; Referee: Muñiz Ruiz |

Promoted to Segunda División
| Racing Santander (4 years later) | Fuenlabrada (First time ever) |

==== Final ====
| Team 1 | Agg. | Team 2 | 1st leg | 2nd leg |
|---|---|---|---|---|
| Racing Santander | 1–2 | Fuenlabrada | 1–2 | 0–0 |

| 9 June 2019 | Racing Santander | 1–2 | Fuenlabrada | Santander |
| 18:30 (CEST) | Olaortua 68' | | Lázaro 14'; Prieto 90+1' | Stadium: El Sardinero; Attendance: 6,152; Referee: Ripoll Solano |

| 12 June 2019 | Fuenlabrada | 0–0 (2–1 agg.) | Racing Santander | Fuenlabrada |
| 20:30 (CEST) | | | | Stadium: Fernando Torres; Referee: García Gómez |

Segunda División B
2018–19 champions
Fuenlabrada

== Non-champions promotion play-off ==
=== First round ===
==== Qualified teams ====
| Group | Position | Team |
|---|---|---|
| 1 | 2nd | Ponferradina |
| 2 | 2nd | UD Logroñés |
| 3 | 2nd | Hércules |
| 4 | 2nd | FC Cartagena |

| Group | Position | Team |
|---|---|---|
| 1 | 3rd | Atlético Madrid B |
| 2 | 3rd | Mirandés |
| 3 | 3rd | Villarreal B |
| 4 | 3rd | Melilla |

| Group | Position | Team |
|---|---|---|
| 1 | 4th | Real Madrid Castilla |
| 2 | 4th | Barakaldo |
| 3 | 4th | Cornellà |
| 4 | 4th | Badajoz |

==== Matches ====
| Team 1 | Agg. | Team 2 | 1st leg | 2nd leg |
|---|---|---|---|---|
| Barakaldo | 1–1 (a) | Hércules | 1–1 | 0–0 |
| Badajoz | 3–4 | UD Logroñés | 0–1 | 3–3 |
| Real Madrid Castilla | 3–3 (a) | FC Cartagena | 3–1 | 0–2 |
| Cornellà | 2–3 | Ponferradina | 2–1 | 0–2 |
| Villarreal B | 1–4 | Melilla | 0–2 | 1–2 |
| Atlético Madrid B | 1–2 | Mirandés | 0–0 | 1–2 |

===== First leg =====
| 25 May 2019 | Real Madrid Castilla | 3–1 | FC Cartagena | Madrid |
| 18:00 (CEST) | Dani Gómez 25', 33'; Cristo 36' | Report | Santi Jara 86' | Stadium: Alfredo di Stéfano; Attendance: 3,280; Referee: Ruipérez Marín |

| 25 May 2019 | Badajoz | 0–1 | UD Logroñés | Badajoz |
| 19:00 (CEST) | | Report | Ñoño 73' | Stadium: Nuevo Vivero; Referee: Guzmán Mansilla |

| 26 May 2019 | Atlético Madrid B | 0–0 | Mirandés | Majadahonda |
| 12:00 (CEST) | | Report | | Stadium: Cerro del Espino; Referee: Albert Ávalos Martos |

| 26 May 2019 | Barakaldo | 1–1 | Hércules | Barakaldo |
| 18:00 (CEST) | Antonio Sánchez 16' | Report | Benja 73' | Stadium: Lasesarre; Referee: López Parra |

| 26 May 2019 | Villarreal B | 0–2 | Melilla | Villarreal |
| 18:30 (CEST) | | Report | Menudo 63' (pen.), 90' | Stadium: Ciudad Deportiva; Referee: Collado López |

| 26 May 2019 | Cornellà | 2–1 | Ponferradina | Cornellà de Llobregat |
| 19:15 (CEST) | Jon García 60'; Agus Medina 96' | Report | Sielva 47' | Stadium: Nou Camp Municipal; Referee: Monter Solans |

===== Second leg =====
| 2 June 2019 | Hércules | 0–0 (1–1 (a) agg.) | Barakaldo | Alicante |
| 19:30 (CEST) | | Report | | Stadium: José Rico Pérez; Attendance: 15,985; Referee: Usón Rosel |

| 2 June 2019 | UD Logroñés | 3–3 (4–3 agg.) | Badajoz | Logroño |
| 19:30 (CEST) | Francis 5' (o.g.); César 37'; Andy 70' (pen.) | Report | Francis 17', 42'; Martín 33' | Stadium: Las Gaunas; Attendance: 9,141; Referee: Palencia Caballero |

| 2 June 2019 | FC Cartagena | 2–0 (3–3 (a) agg.) | Real Madrid Castilla | Cartagena |
| 19:30 (CEST) | Zorrilla 2'; Miguel Ángel 11' | Report | | Stadium: Cartagonova; Referee: Santos Pargaña |

| 2 June 2019 | Melilla | 2–1 (4–1 agg.) | Villarreal B | Melilla |
| 19:30 (CEST) | Menudo 64'; Alfonsito 90+2' | Report | Mario 41' | Stadium: Álvarez Claro; Referee: Hernández Maeso |

| 2 June 2019 | Mirandés | 2–1 (2–1 agg.) | Atlético Madrid B | Miranda de Ebro |
| 19:30 (CEST) | Matheus 55'; Rey 82' (pen.) | Report | Óscar García 29' | Stadium: Anduva; Attendance: 3,020; Referee: Muñoz Pérez |

| 2 June 2019 | Ponferradina | 2–0 (3–2 agg.) | Cornellà | Ponferrada |
| 20:00 (CEST) | Isi 13'; Kaxe 52' | Report | | Stadium: El Toralín; Attendance: 7,872; Referee: Fernández Buergo |

=== Second round ===
==== Qualified teams ====
| Group | Pos. | Team |
|---|---|---|
| 3 | 1st | Atlético Baleares |
| 4 | 1st | Recreativo |

| Group | Pos. | Team |
|---|---|---|
| 1 | 2nd | Ponferradina |
| 2 | 2nd | UD Logroñés |
| 3 | 2nd | Hércules |
| 4 | 2nd | FC Cartagena |

| Group | Pos. | Team |
|---|---|---|
| 2 | 3rd | Mirandés |
| 4 | 3rd | Melilla |

==== Matches ====
| Team 1 | Agg. | Team 2 | 1st leg | 2nd leg |
|---|---|---|---|---|
| Mirandés | 2–1 | Recreativo | 1–0 | 1–1 |
| Melilla | 0–1 | Atlético Baleares | 0–0 | 0–1 |
| Hércules | 3–1 | UD Logroñés | 3–1 | 0–0 |
| FC Cartagena | 1–3 | Ponferradina | 1–2 | 0–1 |

===== First leg =====
| 9 June 2019 | Mirandés | 1–0 | Recreativo | Miranda de Ebro |
| 12:30 (CEST) | Hugo Rama 4' | Report | | Stadium: Anduva; Attendance: 3,119; Referee: Ruiz Álvarez |

| 9 June 2019 | Melilla | 0–0 | Atlético Baleares | Melilla |
| 18:30 (CEST) | | Report | | Stadium: Álvarez Claro; Referee: Sánchez Villalobos |

| 9 June 2019 | Hércules | 3–1 | UD Logroñés | Alicante |
| 18:45 (CEST) | Martínez 56', 78' (pen.); Alfaro 70' | Report | Olaetxea 46' | Stadium: José Rico Pérez; Attendance: 18,235; Referee: González Hernández |

| 9 June 2019 | FC Cartagena | 1–2 | Ponferradina | Cartagena |
| 19:30 (CEST) | Cruz 25' | Report | Ríos Reina 61'; Yuri 86' | Stadium: Cartagonova; Referee: González Esteban |

===== Second leg =====
| 15 June 2019 | UD Logroñés | 0–0 (1–3 agg.) | Hércules | Logroño |
| 18:30 (CEST) | | | | Stadium: Las Gaunas; Attendance: 10,754; Referee: García Verdura |

| 15 June 2019 | Ponferradina | 1–0 (3–1 agg.) | FC Cartagena | Ponferrada |
| 20:30 (CEST) | Isi 57' | | | Stadium: El Toralín; Attendance: 8,362; Referee: Busquets Ferrer |

| 16 June 2019 | Atlético Baleares | 1–0 (1–0 agg.) | Melilla | Palma |
| 18:00 (CEST) | Marong 19' | | | Stadium: Son Malferit; Referee: Caparrós Hernández |

| 16 June 2019 | Recreativo | 1–1 (1–2 agg.) | Mirandés | Huelva |
| 19:00 (CEST) | Quintana 64' | | Adot 90+2' | Stadium: Nuevo Colombino; Referee: Sánchez López |

=== Third round ===
==== Qualified teams ====
| Group | Pos. | Team |
|---|---|---|
| 3 | 1st | Atlético Baleares |

| Group | Pos. | Team |
|---|---|---|
| 1 | 2nd | Ponferradina |
| 3 | 2nd | Hércules |

| Group | Pos. | Team |
|---|---|---|
| 2 | 3rd | Mirandés |

==== Matches ====
| Team 1 | Agg. | Team 2 | 1st leg | 2nd leg |
|---|---|---|---|---|
| Mirandés | 3–3 (a) | Atlético Baleares | 2–0 | 1–3 |
| Hércules | 1–4 | Ponferradina | 1–3 | 0–1 |

===== First leg =====
| 23 June 2019 | Mirandés | 2–0 | Atlético Baleares | Miranda de Ebro |
| 18:45 (CEST) | Matheus 30'; Rey 41' | Report | | Stadium: Anduva; Referee: Calderiña Pavón |

| 23 June 2019 | Hércules | 1–3 | Ponferradina | Alicante |
| 20:00 (CEST) | Samuel 90' | Report | Isi Palazón 4', 37'; Aizpuru 67' | Stadium: José Rico Pérez; Attendance: 26,256; Referee: Velasco Arbaiza |

===== Second leg =====
| 30 June 2019 | Atlético Baleares | 3–1 (3–3 (a) agg.) | Mirandés | Palma |
| 18:00 | Nuha 56', 61'; Marcos 78' | | Matheus 17' | Stadium: Son Malferit; Referee: Ortiz Arias |

| 29 June 2019 | Ponferradina | 1–0 (4–1 agg.) | Hércules | Ponferrada |
| 19:30 | Sielva 4' | Report | | Stadium: El Toralín; Attendance: 8,432; Referee: Conejero Sánchez |

Promoted to Segunda División
| Ponferradina (3 years later) | Mirandés (2 years later) |

== Relegation play-off ==
=== Qualified teams ===
| Group | Position | Team |
|---|---|---|
| 1 | 16th | Celta Vigo B |
| 2 | 16th | Real Unión |
| 3 | 16th | Alcoyano |
| 4 | 16th | Jumilla |

=== Matches ===
The losers of this tournament will be relegated to the 2019–20 Tercera División.

| Team 1 | Agg. | Team 2 | 1st leg | 2nd leg |
|---|---|---|---|---|
| Jumilla | 2–4 | Real Unión | 2–2 | 0–2 |
| Celta Vigo B | 2–0 | Alcoyano | 1–0 | 1–0 |

==== First leg ====
| 26 May 2019 | Celta Vigo B | 1–0 | Alcoyano | Vigo |
| 12:00 (CEST) | Apeh 64' | Report | | Stadium: Barreiro; Referee: Román Román |

| 26 May 2019 | Jumilla | 2–2 | Real Unión | Jumilla |
| 18:00 (CEST) | Manolo 54'; Bouba 93' | Report | Galán 9' (pen.); Esnaola 70' | Stadium: Uva Monastrell; Referee: Bosch Doménech |

==== Second leg ====
| 2 June 2019 | Alcoyano | 0–1 (0–2 agg.) | Celta Vigo B | Alcoy |
| 18:00 (CEST) | | | Apeh 90+6' | Stadium: Estadio El Collao; Referee: Vicente Moral |

| 2 June 2019 | Real Unión | 2–0 (4–2 agg.) | Jumilla | Irun |
| 18:30 (CEST) | Eizmendi 44'; Orbegozo 86' | | | Stadium: Stadium Gal; Referee: Muñoz Piedra |

Relegated to Tercera División
| Alcoyano (15 years later) | Jumilla (4 years later) |
