= Antonio Glauder =

Spanish footballer (born 1995)

Personal information
- Full name: Antonio Cristian Glauder García
- Date of birth: 18 October 1995 (age 31)
- Place of birth: Algeciras, Spain
- Height: 1.84 m (6 ft 0 in)
- Position: Centre back

Team information
- Current team: Johor Darul Ta'zim
- Number: 5

Youth career
- Algeciras
- 2008–2010: Cádiz
- 2010–2011: Barcelona
- 2011–2014: Villarreal

Senior career*
Years	Team	Apps	(Gls)
2014–2015	Villarreal C	20	(0)
2015–2017	Espanyol B	48	(1)
2017–2019	Alavés	0	(0)
2017–2018	→ Rudeš (loan)	20	(0)
2018–2019	→ Fuenlabrada (loan)	31	(0)
2019–2021	Fuenlabrada	102	(4)
2021–2022	Eibar	13	(0)
2022–2024	Albacete	68	(3)
2024–2025	Cádiz	12	(0)
2025–	Johor Darul Ta'zim	10	(2)
- * Club domestic league appearances and goals as of 17 January 2026

Antonio Cristian Glauder García (born 18 October 1995), known as Glauder, is a Spanish professional footballer who plays as a central defender for the Malaysia Super League club Johor Darul Ta'zim.

== Club career ==
Glauder was born in Algeciras, Cádiz, Andalusia, and represented Algeciras CF, Cádiz CF, FC Barcelona and Villarreal CF as a youth. He made his senior debut for the latter's C-team on 3 September 2014, coming on as a second-half substitute and being sent off in a 1–1 Tercera División away draw against CD Acero.

On 6 July 2015, Glauder signed a two-year contract RCD Espanyol, being assigned to the reserves in Segunda División B. On 7 July 2017, he agreed to a three-year deal with Deportivo Alavés, and was immediately loaned to Croatian First Football League club NK Rudeš for one year.

Glauder made his professional debut on 28 July 2017, starting in a 1–1 away draw against NK Lokomotiva. On 18 July of the following year, he joined third division side CF Fuenlabrada on loan for one year.

On 9 July 2019, after being an undisputed starter as his club achieved promotion to Segunda División for the first time ever, Glauder signed a permanent one-year deal with Fuenla. He scored his first professional goal on 25 August, netting the winner in a 2–1 away success over Extremadura UD.

On 30 June 2021, Glauder signed a two-year contract with SD Eibar. On 31 August of the following year, after featuring sparingly, he terminated his link, and signed a one-year deal with fellow second division side Albacete Balompié the following day.

On 16 June 2024, Glauder agreed to a two-year deal with Cádiz CF, recently relegated to division two. The following 31 January, he terminated his link with the club.

On 1 June 2025, Glauder was announced as the newest signing for Malaysia Super League club Johor Darul Ta'zim.

== Career statistics ==
As of match played 8 April 2023

Appearances and goals by club, season and competition
Club	Season	League			Cup		Other		Total	
Club	Season	Division	Apps	Goals	Apps	Goals	Apps	Goals	Apps	Goals
Rudeš	2017–18	Croatian First Football League	20	0	1	1	—		21	1
Fuenlabrada	2018–19	Segunda División B	35	2	0	0	—		35	2
Fuenlabrada	2019–20	Segunda División	37	4	0	0	—		37	4
Fuenlabrada	2020–21	Segunda División	34	3	1	0	—		35	3
Fuenlabrada	Total		106	9	1	0	—		107	9
Eibar	2021–22	Segunda División	13	0	3	0	—		16	0
Albacete	2022–23	La Liga	31	0	1	0	—		32	0
Albacete	2023–24	Segunda División	39	3	1	0	—		40	3
Albacete	Total		70	3	2	0	—		72	3
Cádiz	2024–25	Segunda División	12	0	2	0	—		14	0
Career total			221	12	9	1	0	0	230	13

== Honours ==
=== Johor Darul Ta'zim ===
Malaysia Charity Shield: 2025
