= Pathé Ciss =

Senegalese footballer (born 1994)

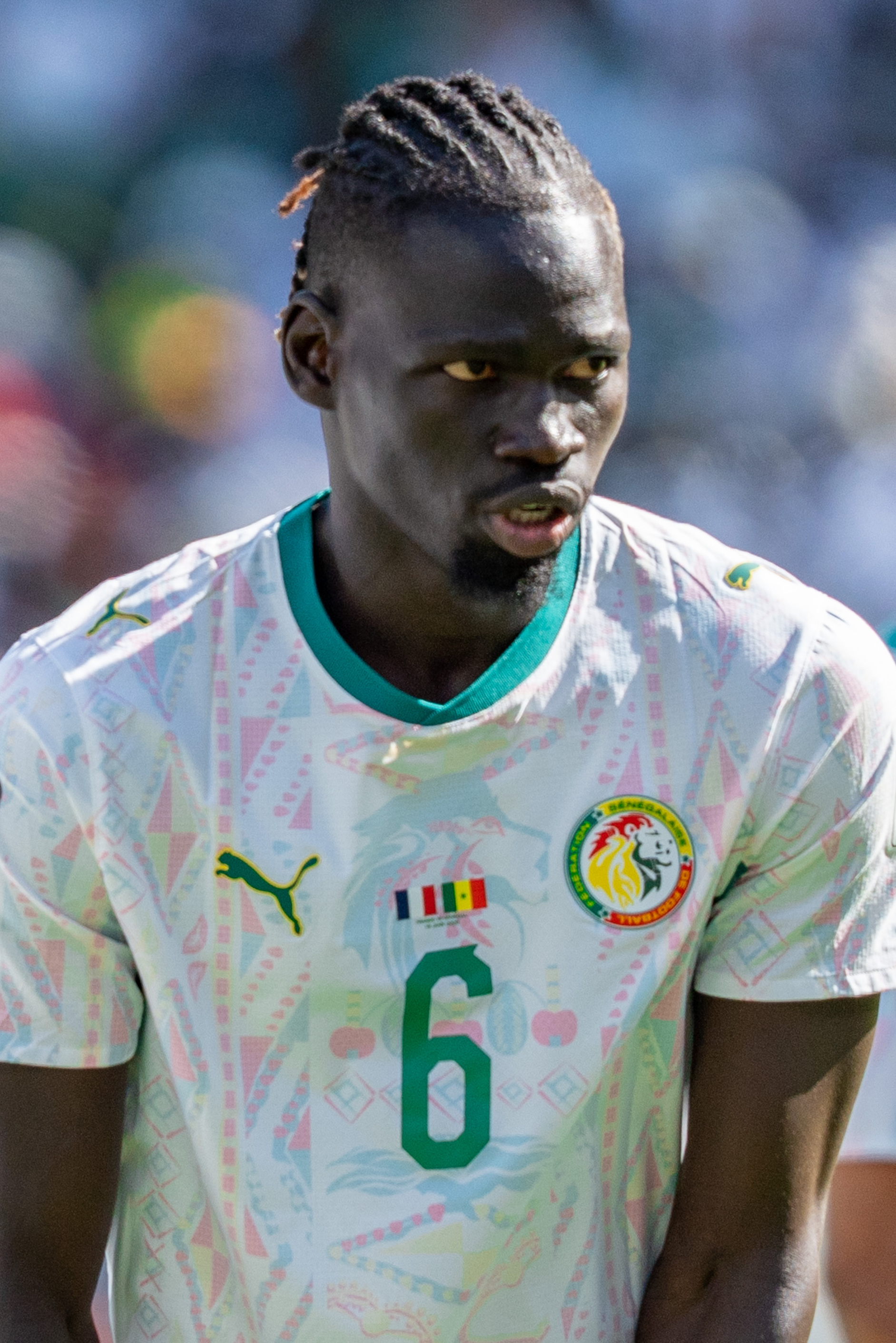
- Ciss with Senegal in 2026

Personal information
- Full name: Pathé Ismaël Ciss
- Date of birth: 16 March 1994 (age 32)
- Place of birth: Dakar, Senegal
- Height: 1.86 m (6 ft 1 in)
- Position: Central midfielder

Team information
- Current team: Rayo Vallecano
- Number: 6

Youth career
- 2006–2014: Diambars

Senior career*
Years	Team	Apps	(Gls)
2014–2017	Diambars		
2017–2020	União Madeira	30	(2)
2018–2019	→ Famalicão (loan)	28	(4)
2019–2020	→ Fuenlabrada (loan)	20	(3)
2020–2021	Fuenlabrada	30	(3)
2021–	Rayo Vallecano	167	(10)

International career^{‡}
2022–	Senegal	35	(0)
Medal record
Men's football
Representing Senegal
Africa Cup of Nations
Runner-up	2025 Morocco
- * Club domestic league appearances and goals as of 21 November 2026 ‡ National team caps and goals as of 15:40, 2 July 2026 (UTC)

Pathé Ismaël Ciss (born 16 March 1994) is a Senegalese professional footballer who plays as a central or defensive midfielder for La Liga club Rayo Vallecano and the Senegal national team.

== Club career ==
Ciss was born in Dakar, and joined the Diambars FC academy at the age of 12, joining his older brother Saliou and father Ibou, who was a coach there. He started his senior career at Diambars, before joining LigaPro side C.F. União on 31 July 2017.

Ciss made his professional debut on 13 August 2017, coming on as a late substitute for Gonçalo Abreu in a 2–0 home win against Real S.C. He scored his first goal abroad on 29 October, netting the game's only in a home defeat of U.D. Oliveirense.

On 30 August 2018, after União suffered relegation, Ciss moved to F.C. Famalicão on a one-year loan deal, still in the second division. He contributed with four goals during the campaign, as his side returned to Primeira Liga after 25 years.

On 2 September 2019, Ciss was loaned to Segunda División side CF Fuenlabrada, for one year. The following 13 July, he signed a permanent contract until 2023 with the club.

On 28 July 2021, Ciss signed a four-year deal with fellow Spanish side Rayo Vallecano, newly promoted to La Liga, along with teammate Randy Nteka.

== International career ==
Ciss made his debut for the Senegal national team in a friendly match with Bolivia on 24 September 2022. He was named in coach Aliou Cissé's squad for the 2022 FIFA World Cup, making his tournament debut as a substitute in Senegal's 3–1 win over host nation Qatar. He went on to start against Ecuador in the team's final group match and England in the round of 16.

In December 2023, he was named in Senegal's squad for the postponed 2023 Africa Cup of Nations held in the Ivory Coast.

On 21 May 2026, Ciss was officially selected by Senegal national team head coach Pape Thiaw as part of the 28-man squad for the 2026 FIFA World Cup.

== Career statistics ==
=== Club ===
As of match played 21 November 2026

Appearances and goals by club, season and competition
Club	Season	League			National cup (Note: Includes Taça de Portugal, Copa del Rey)		League cup (Note: Includes Taça da Liga)		Other		Total	
Club	Season	Division	Apps	Goals	Apps	Goals	Apps	Goals	Apps	Goals	Apps	Goals
União Madeira	2017–18	LigaPro	30	2	1	0	3	0	—		34	2
Famalicão (loan)	2018–19	LigaPro	28	4	0	0	0	0	—		28	4
Fuenlabrada (loan)	2019–20	Segunda División	20	3	2	0	—		—		22	3
Fuenlabrada	2020–21	Segunda División	30	3	1	0	—		—		31	3
Fuenlabrada	Fuenlabrada total		50	6	3	0	—		—		53	6
Rayo Vallecano	2021–22	La Liga	31	2	5	1	—		—		36	3
Rayo Vallecano	2022–23	La Liga	32	1	1	0	—		—		33	1
Rayo Vallecano	2023–24	La Liga	31	1	1	0	—		—		32	1
Rayo Vallecano	2024–25	La Liga	33	4	2	0	—		—		35	4
Rayo Vallecano	2025–26	La Liga	29	2	2	0	—		12 (Note: Appearances in UEFA Conference League)	0	43	2
Rayo Vallecano	2026–27	La Liga	11	0	0	0	—		—		11	0
Rayo Vallecano	Total		167	10	11	1	—		12	0	190	11
Career total			275	22	15	1	3	0	12	0	307	23

=== International ===
As of match played 1 July 2026

Appearances and goals by national team and year
National team	Year	Apps	Goals
Senegal	2022	4	0
Senegal	2023	8	0
Senegal	2024	6	0
Senegal	2025	8	0
Senegal	2026	9	0
Total		35	0

== Honours ==
Rayo Vallecano

- UEFA Conference League runner-up: 2025–26
