= Mikel Iribas =

Spanish footballer

Personal information
- Full name: Mikel Iribas Allende
- Date of birth: 13 April 1988 (age 38)
- Place of birth: San Sebastián, Spain
- Height: 1.84 m (6 ft 1/2 in)
- Positions: Right-back; midfielder

Team information
- Current team: Fuenlabrada (assistant)

Youth career
- Antiguoko
- Real Sociedad

Senior career*
Years	Team	Apps	(Gls)
2007–2008	Real Sociedad B	14	(0)
2008–2013	Mirandés	122	(9)
2013–2016	Alcorcón	41	(4)
2016–2023	Fuenlabrada	198	(2)
Total		375	(15)

Managerial career
- 2025–: Fuenlabrada (assistant)
- * Club domestic league appearances and goals

Mikel Iribas Allende (born 13 April 1988) is a Spanish retired footballer who played as a right-back or midfielder, and the current assistant manager of CF Fuenlabrada.

== Club career ==
Born in San Sebastián, Gipuzkoa, Iribas was a product of Real Sociedad's youth system, and played one sole season with the club's B team, in Segunda División B. In August 2008, he dropped down to the Tercera División and signed a contract with CD Mirandés, scoring twice in 30 games as the campaign ended in promotion.

Again as a first-team regular, Iribas helped to another promotion in 2011–12, contributing two goals in 1,868 minutes of action. On 17 August 2012, both he and the Castile and León side made their debut in the Segunda División, in a 0–1 loss against SD Huesca. He netted his first goal in the competition on 3 November, helping to a 3–0 home win over FC Barcelona B.

Iribas signed with AD Alcorcón also of the second tier in late June 2013. He left in June 2016, and subsequently returned to the third division with CF Fuenlabrada.

On 6 July 2019, after scoring twice from 31 appearances during the campaign (playoffs included), as the club achieved second-tier promotion for the first time in history, the 31-year-old Iribas renewed his contract for a further year. He continued to appear regularly for Fuenla in the following years, appearing in 40 matches during the 2021–22 season as the club suffered relegation to Primera Federación.

On 12 June 2023, Fuenlabrada announced Iribas' retirement from professional football; he continued to work at the club as a technical secretary, sporting director and assistant manager.
