= Damián Cáceres =

Spanish footballer

Damián
Personal information
- Full name: Damián Cáceres Rodríguez
- Date of birth: 31 May 2003 (age 23)
- Place of birth: Moraleja de Enmedio, Spain
- Height: 1.81 m (5 ft 11 in)
- Position: Midfielder

Team information
- Current team: Córdoba

Youth career
- Móstoles
- 2014–2018: Trival Valderas
- 2019–2021: Fuenlabrada

Senior career*
Years	Team	Apps	(Gls)
2019–2021	Fuenlabrada B	3	(1)
2021–2022	Fuenlabrada	12	(2)
2022–2024	Sporting B	60	(5)
2024–2026	Getafe B	56	(1)
2026	Getafe	3	(0)
2026–	Córdoba	0	(0)
- * Club domestic league appearances and goals as of 24 May 2026

Damián Cáceres Rodríguez (born 31 May 2003), sometimes simply known as Damián, is a Spanish footballer who plays as a midfielder for Córdoba CF.

== Club career ==
Born in Moraleja de Enmedio, Community of Madrid, Damián joined CF Fuenlabrada's youth setup in 2018, aged 15, after representing CF Trival Valderas and CD Móstoles URJC. On 16 December 2020, before even having appeared with the reserves, he made his first team debut at the age of 17 by coming on as a late substitute for Tahiru Awudu in a 1–0 away success over CD Atlético Baleares, for the season's Copa del Rey.

Damián made his professional debut on 19 December 2020; after replacing Jano in the 57th minute, he scored his team's third six minutes later in a 3–2 Segunda División away win against RCD Mallorca. He also became the youngest player of Fuenla to debut (also to score) in professional football.

On 9 June 2022, Damián signed a two-year contract with Sporting de Gijón B in Tercera Federación. On 3 July 2024, he moved to another reserve team, Getafe CF B in Segunda Federación.

Damián made his first team – and La Liga – debut with Geta on 13 May 2026, starting in a 3–1 home win over RCD Mallorca. On 5 July, he agreed to a one-year deal with Córdoba CF in the second division.
