= Randy Nteka =

Angolan footballer (born 1997)

Personal information
- Date of birth: 6 December 1997 (age 28)
- Place of birth: Paris, France
- Height: 1.89 m (6 ft 2 in)
- Positions: Attacking midfielder; forward

Team information
- Current team: Rayo Vallecano
- Number: 11

Senior career*
Years	Team	Apps	(Gls)
–2017	Linas-Montlhéry		
2017	Betis San Isidro	13	(3)
2017–2021	Fuenlabrada	127	(22)
2021–	Rayo Vallecano	100	(10)
2023	→ Elche (loan)	14	(0)

International career^{‡}
2024–	Angola	15	(2)
- * Club domestic league appearances and goals as of 31 August 2026 ‡ National team caps and goals as of 1 May 2026

Randy Nteka (born 6 December 1997) is a professional footballer who plays for La Liga club Rayo Vallecano. Mainly an attacking midfielder, he can also play as a forward. Born in France, he represents Angola internationally.

== Club career ==
=== Early career ===
Born in Paris, Nteka left his hometown and joined Spanish side Betis San Isidro on a trial period in January 2017, after having been called by an agent proposing a move to Madrid and trials with bigger clubs. He made his debut for the club during the 2016–17 season, scoring three goals in 13 appearances. While at Betis San Isidro, Nteka was left without a paycheck. Eventually, the club offered him 300 euros a month, and to justify the expense, had him take care of the training ground and clean the dressing room.

=== Fuenlabrada ===
In November 2017, after a failed move to Rayo Vallecano B, Nteka joined Fuenlabrada and was initially assigned to the reserves in the regional leagues. However, he never played for the B-team, being immediately included in Antonio Calderón's main squad and making his first-team debut on 7 January 2018, starting and scoring the opener in a 2–1 away defeat of Deportivo Fabril in the Segunda División B.

Nteka renewed with Fuenla on 22 June 2018, after agreeing to a three-year deal. He was a regular starter during the campaign, contributing with eight goals as his side achieved promotion to Segunda División for the first time ever.

Nteka made his professional debut on 17 August 2019, starting in a 2–0 away defeat of Elche CF. He scored his first professional goal on 13 October, netting his team's only in a 2–1 away loss against Mirandés.

Nteka scored eight goals for Fuenla during the 2020–21 campaign, being the club's top goalscorer as they achieved a mid-table finish.

=== Rayo Vallecano ===
On 28 July 2021, Nteka signed a five-year contract with Rayo Vallecano, newly promoted to La Liga, along with teammate Pathé Ciss. He made his top tier debut on 15 August, starting in a 3–0 loss at Sevilla.

On 29 August 2021, Nteka scored his first goal for Rayo against Granada in a 4–0 home victory.

==== Loan to Elche ====
On 1 February 2023, Rayo announced the loan of Nteka to fellow top-tier side Elche until the end of the season.

== International career ==
Born in France, Nteka is of Angolan and DR Congolese descent. He made his debut for the Angola national team on 7 June 2024 in a World Cup qualifier against Eswatini at the Estádio 11 de Novembro. He played the full game as Angola won 1–0.

On 3 December 2025, Nteka was called up to the Angola squad for the 2025 Africa Cup of Nations.

== Career statistics ==
=== Club ===
As of match played 31 August 2026

Appearances and goals by club, season and competition
Club	Season	League			National cup		Europe		Other		Total	
Club	Season	Division	Apps	Goals	Apps	Goals	Apps	Goals	Apps	Goals	Apps	Goals
Betis San Isidro	2016–17	Preferente de Madrid	13	3	—		—		—		13	3
Fuenlabrada	2017–18	Segunda División B	17	3	0	0	—		4 (Note: Appearance(s) in Promotion Playoffs)	0	21	3
Fuenlabrada	2018–19	Segunda División B	34	7	2	1	—		4	1	40	9
Fuenlabrada	2019–20	Segunda División	38	4	2	0	—		—		40	4
Fuenlabrada	2020–21	Segunda División	38	8	2	0	—		—		40	8
Fuenlabrada	Total		127	22	6	1	—		8	1	141	24
Rayo Vallecano	2021–22	La Liga	34	3	5	0	—		—		39	3
Rayo Vallecano	2022–23	La Liga	10	0	2	0	—		—		12	0
Rayo Vallecano	2023–24	La Liga	16	1	4	1	—		—		20	2
Rayo Vallecano	2024–25	La Liga	24	3	3	0	—		—		27	3
Rayo Vallecano	2025–26	La Liga	13	3	1	0	2 (Note: Appearance(s) in UEFA Conference League)	0	—		16	3
Rayo Vallecano	2026–27	La Liga	3	0	0	0	—		—		3	0
Rayo Vallecano	Total		100	10	15	1	2	0	—		117	11
Elche (loan)	2022–23	La Liga	14	0	0	0	—		—		14	0
Career total			254	35	21	2	2	0	8	1	285	38

=== International ===
As of match played 26 December 2025

Appearances and goals by national team and year
National team	Year	Apps	Goals
Angola	2024	5	1
Angola	2025	10	1
Total		15	2

Scores and results list Angola's goal tally first, score column indicates score after each Nteka goal.

List of international goals scored by Randy Nteka
No.	Date	Venue	Opponent	Score	Result	Competition
1	9 September 2024	Estádio 11 de Novembro, Belas, Angola	Sudan	2–1	2–1	2025 Africa Cup of National qualification
2	10 June 2025	Free State Stadium, Bloemfontein, South Africa	Malawi	1–0	1–0	2025 COSAFA Cup

== Honours ==
Fuenlabrada

- Segunda División B: 2018–19
