= Juanma (footballer, born 1982) =

Spanish footballer

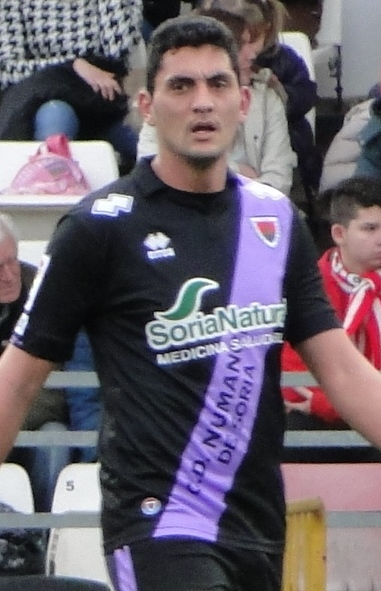
- Juanma with Numancia in 2015

Personal information
- Full name: Juan Manuel Marrero Monzón
- Date of birth: 18 October 1982 (age 44)
- Place of birth: Las Palmas, Spain
- Height: 1.85 m (6 ft 1 in)
- Position: Wing-back

Team information
- Current team: Las Palmas B (assistant)

Senior career*
Years	Team	Apps	(Gls)
2002–2003	Vecindario		
2003–2008	Las Palmas	95	(10)
2008–2010	Rayo Vallecano	3	(0)
2009–2010	→ Huesca (loan)	22	(0)
2010–2012	Oviedo	49	(2)
2012–2016	Numancia	128	(18)
2016–2023	Fuenlabrada	158	(14)
Total		455+	(44+)

Managerial career
- 2025: Fuenlabrada (assistant)
- 2025–: Las Palmas B (assistant)
- * Club domestic league appearances and goals

Juan Manuel Marrero Monzón (born 18 October 1982), known as Juanma, is a Spanish former professional footballer. On the left side, he could either operate as a defender or a midfielder.

He played 285 Segunda División games for Las Palmas, Rayo Vallecano, Huesca, Numancia and Fuenlabrada, scoring 27 times. He added 155 matches and 17 goals in the Segunda División B with Las Palmas, Oviedo and Fuenlabrada.

== Club career ==
=== Las Palmas ===
Born in Las Palmas, Canary Islands, Juanma moved from UD Vecindario to UD Las Palmas, where he made his professional debut in the Segunda División on 6 September 2003, starting in a 2–2 home draw against CD Leganés. After two years in the Segunda División B, he scored his first goal in the second tier on 26 September 2006, a first-half penalty in a game of the same result also at the Estadio Gran Canaria.

=== Rayo Vallecano ===
Juanma signed a two-year contract with Rayo Vallecano in July 2008. Barely used in his time in the outskirts of Madrid, he was loaned a year later to SD Huesca also in the second division.

=== Oviedo and Numancia ===
On 25 August 2010, free agent Juanma joined Real Oviedo. After two seasons in division three, neither ending in a playoff place, he returned up a level at CD Numancia. Used regularly by Pablo Machín and Juan Antonio Anquela, he signed a new two-year deal with the option of a third in October 2015.

=== Fuenlabrada ===
In July 2016, having rescinded his contract when his opportunities in Soria decreased, Juanma dropped back down to Segunda B to represent CF Fuenlabrada. Having achieved promotion to the second tier via the playoffs for the first time – as champions and at the third time of asking – the 36-year-old captain renewed for one more season with the possibility of another in June 2019.

Still a regular player for Fuenla, Juanma agreed to a one-year extension in July 2021.

== Honours ==
Fuenlabrada

- Segunda División B: 2018–19
