= Rubén Gálvez =

Spanish footballer (born 1993)

Personal information
- Full name: Rubén Ramos González
- Date of birth: 15 May 1993 (age 33)
- Place of birth: Aracena, Spain
- Height: 1.82 m (5 ft 11 1/2 in)
- Position: Goalkeeper

Team information
- Current team: Teruel
- Number: 13

Youth career
- 2006–2011: Recreativo

Senior career*
Years	Team	Apps	(Gls)
2011–2013	Recreativo B	35	(0)
2013–2018	Recreativo	82	(0)
2014	→ Huesca (loan)	2	(0)
2018–2020	San Fernando	62	(0)
2020–2021	Melilla	14	(0)
2021–2025	Recreativo	142	(0)
2025–	Teruel	33	(0)
- * Club domestic league appearances and goals as of 10 June 2026

Rubén Ramos González (born 15 May 1993), commonly known as Rubén Gálvez, is a Spanish professional footballer who plays for Primera Federación club Teruel as a goalkeeper.

== Club career ==
Born in Aracena, Province of Huelva, Andalusia, Gálvez graduated from local Recreativo de Huelva's academy, and spent his first two years as a senior with their reserves. On 26 May 2013 he first appeared for the main squad, starting in a 2–1 home win against Córdoba CF in the Segunda División.

On 27 January 2014, Rubén signed a new two-year deal with Recre, being immediately loaned to Segunda División B club SD Huesca. He returned to the former in May, being definitely promoted to the first team.
