= Alejandro Sotillos =

Spanish footballer

Personal information
- Full name: Alejandro Sotillos Miarnau
- Date of birth: 28 January 1998 (age 28)
- Place of birth: Madrid, Spain
- Height: 1.80 m (5 ft 11 in)
- Position: Centre back

Team information
- Current team: Hércules
- Number: 20

Youth career
- 2005–2006: Atlético Pinto
- 2006–2017: Real Madrid

Senior career*
Years	Team	Apps	(Gls)
2017–2019	Real Madrid B	0	(0)
2017–2018	→ Logroñés (loan)	20	(2)
2018–2019	→ Fuenlabrada (loan)	24	(1)
2020–2024	Fuenlabrada	128	(3)
2024–	Hércules	42	(3)
- * Club domestic league appearances and goals as of 10 June 2026

Alejandro Sotillos Miarnau (born 28 January 1998) is a Spanish professional footballer who plays for Hércules as a central defender.

== Club career ==
Born in Madrid, Sotillos joined Real Madrid's youth setup in 2006, aged eight, from CA Pinto. On 4 July 2017, after finishing his formation, he was loaned to Segunda División B side UD Logroñés for the season.

Sotillos made his senior debut on 28 October 2017, coming on as a late substitute for Rayco in a 3–1 home win against Real Sociedad B. He scored his first goal the following 8 April, netting the opener in a 3–0 home defeat of Gernika Club, and finished the campaign with two goals in 20 appearances.

On 19 July 2018, Sotillos moved to CF Fuenlabrada still in the third division, also in a temporary deal. He contributed with one goal in 24 league matches as the club achieved promotion to Segunda División to the first time ever, but still returned to Castilla in July 2019.

On 11 December 2019, Sotillos returned to Fuenla on a permanent two-and-a-half-year contract. He made his professional debut on 2 February of the following year, starting in a 0–1 home loss against Girona FC.

On 10 July 2024, Sotillos signed with Hércules in the third tier.
