= Cristóbal Márquez =

Spanish footballer (born 1984)

Cristóbal
Personal information
- Full name: Cristóbal Márquez Crespo
- Date of birth: 21 April 1984 (age 42)
- Place of birth: Madrid, Spain
- Height: 1.80 m (5 ft 11 in)
- Position: Midfielder

Senior career*
Years	Team	Apps	(Gls)
2004–2005	Leganés B		
2005–2008	Levante B	39	(6)
2006	→ Conquense (loan)	13	(0)
2006–2007	→ S.S. Reyes (loan)	30	(1)
2008–2010	Villarreal B	75	(13)
2010–2011	Villarreal	2	(0)
2011	→ Elche (loan)	8	(2)
2011–2013	Karpaty Lviv	7	(1)
2012	→ Elche (loan)	8	(2)
2013	Auckland City	3	(2)
2013–2015	Olympiacos Volos	15	(1)
2015	Mitra Kukar	1	(0)
2015–2016	Toledo	26	(5)
2016	Anorthosis	0	(0)
2016–2024	Fuenlabrada	280	(14)
- * Club domestic league appearances and goals as of 25 May 2024

Cristóbal Márquez Crespo (born 21 April 1984), known simply as Cristóbal, is a Spanish professional footballer who plays as a midfielder.

== Club career ==
=== Early career and Villarreal B ===
Born in Madrid, Cristóbal was in the ranks of local CD Leganés before joining Levante UD in 2005, being assigned to their reserves in the Segunda División B. He was also loaned to UB Conquense and UD San Sebastián de los Reyes of the same league.

After Levante B's relegation in 2008, Cristóbal joined Valencian Community neighbours Villarreal CF, also for their second team. He contributed eight goals in his first season as they won promotion to Segunda División, including one in the playoff semi-final win against Lorca Deportiva CF.

=== Villarreal ===
Cristóbal made his first-team debut for the club on 26 August 2010, in the second leg of the UEFA Europa League play-offs away to Belarus' FC Dnepr Mogilev having already won 5–0 at home in the first game; he started and was sent off in the 67th minute of a 2–1 away win. The following 15 January he made the first of two La Liga appearances, as an 86th-minute substitute for Borja Valero in a 4–2 home victory over CA Osasuna. On 27 February, he started at Racing de Santander as Juan Carlos Garrido rested his regulars due to an extended European run, and was taken off for Santi Cazorla just past the hour mark in a 2–2 draw.

On 31 March 2011, Cristóbal was loaned to second-tier Elche CF for the rest of the campaign, after injuries to David Generelo and Miguel Linares. He scored in consecutive away draws at RC Celta de Vigo and Granada CF in late May, as his side ended up losing the playoff final to the latter on the away goals rule.

=== Abroad ===
Cristóbal moved abroad for the first time in July 2011, signing for an undisclosed fee to FC Karpaty Lviv in the Ukrainian Premier League, who also counted compatriot Borja Gómez in their ranks. He made 12 total appearances during his tenure, and scored the equaliser in a 2–1 home loss to FC Metalist Kharkiv on 28 August; he returned on loan to Elche on 28 January 2012.

In July 2013, Cristóbal sued Karpaty for unpaid wages, winning €600,000 and becoming a free agent. Fellow Spaniard Ramon Tribulietx, manager of Oceanian champions Auckland City FC, signed him to the New Zealanders with the lure of the club's participation at the year's FIFA Club World Cup. He played three Championship matches, scoring twice in a 4–4 home draw against Hawke's Bay United FC on 22 December.

After further stints at Olympiacos Volos F.C. (Greece) and PS Mitra Kukar (Indonesia), Cristóbal returned to Spain to play the 2015–16 season at third-tier CD Toledo. After play-off elimination by Hércules CF, he transferred to Anorthosis Famagusta FC of the Cypriot First Division in June 2016.

=== Fuenlabrada ===
Unused in his few weeks on the Eastern Mediterranean island, Cristóbal came back to the Spanish third division and his native Community of Madrid on 31 August 2016, with CF Fuenlabrada. He played regularly in three consecutive play-off seasons, culminating in a championship win in 2019 and the team's first ever promotion to the second tier; his 42 total games earned him a one-year contract extension with the option of a second, at the age of 35.

On 2 February 2020, in a 1–0 home loss to Girona FC, Cristóbal was sent off for a high challenge on Álex Granell; the challenge was downgraded to a yellow card after review by the video assistant referee, and he was called back from the changing room. Seconds later, before play reinitiated, he was dismissed again for a clash of heads with the same opponent.
