= Rubén Pulido (footballer, born 2000) =

Spanish footballer

Personal information
- Full name: Rubén Pulido Peñas
- Date of birth: 2 September 2000 (age 26)
- Place of birth: Madrid, Spain
- Height: 1.84 m (6 ft 0 in)
- Position: Centre-back

Team information
- Current team: Leganés
- Number: 4

Youth career
- 2009–2015: Rayo Vallecano
- 2015–2016: Alcobendas
- 2016–2018: Alcobendas Sport
- 2018–2019: Real Madrid

Senior career*
| Years | Team | Apps | (Gls) |
| 2019–2020 | Real Madrid B | 0 | (0) |
| 2019–2020 | → Rayo Majadahonda (loan) | 16 | (0) |
| 2020–2022 | Fuenlabrada | 64 | (2) |
| 2022–2025 | Huesca | 46 | (1) |
| 2025– | Leganés | 4 | (0) |
- * Club domestic league appearances and goals as of 9 June 2026

Rubén Pulido Peñas (born 2 September 2000) is a Spanish professional footballer who plays as a centre-back for CD Leganés.

== Career ==
Pulido was born in Madrid, and joined Real Madrid's La Fábrica in July 2018, from Fútbol Alcobendas Sport. On 17 July of the following year, after finishing his formation, he was loaned to Segunda División B side CF Rayo Majadahonda for the season.

Pulido made his senior debut on 8 September 2019, coming on as a second-half substitute in a 2–1 home win against CD Atlético Baleares. Roughly one year later, he agreed to a four-year deal with CF Fuenlabrada in Segunda División.

Pulido made his professional debut on 13 September 2020, replacing fellow debutant Tahiru Awudu in a 2–0 home win against CD Lugo. He scored his first goal on 19 December, netting the opener in a 3–2 away win over RCD Mallorca.

On 29 August 2022, after Fuenla's relegation, Pulido signed a three-year deal with SD Huesca also in division two. Mainly a backup option, he suffered a knee injury on 6 November 2023, being sidelined for the remainder of the campaign.

On 2 June 2025, after becoming a starter for Huesca, Pulido agreed to a three-year contract with CD Leganés.
