= Estadio Fernando Torres =

Multi-use stadium in Fuenlabrada, Spain

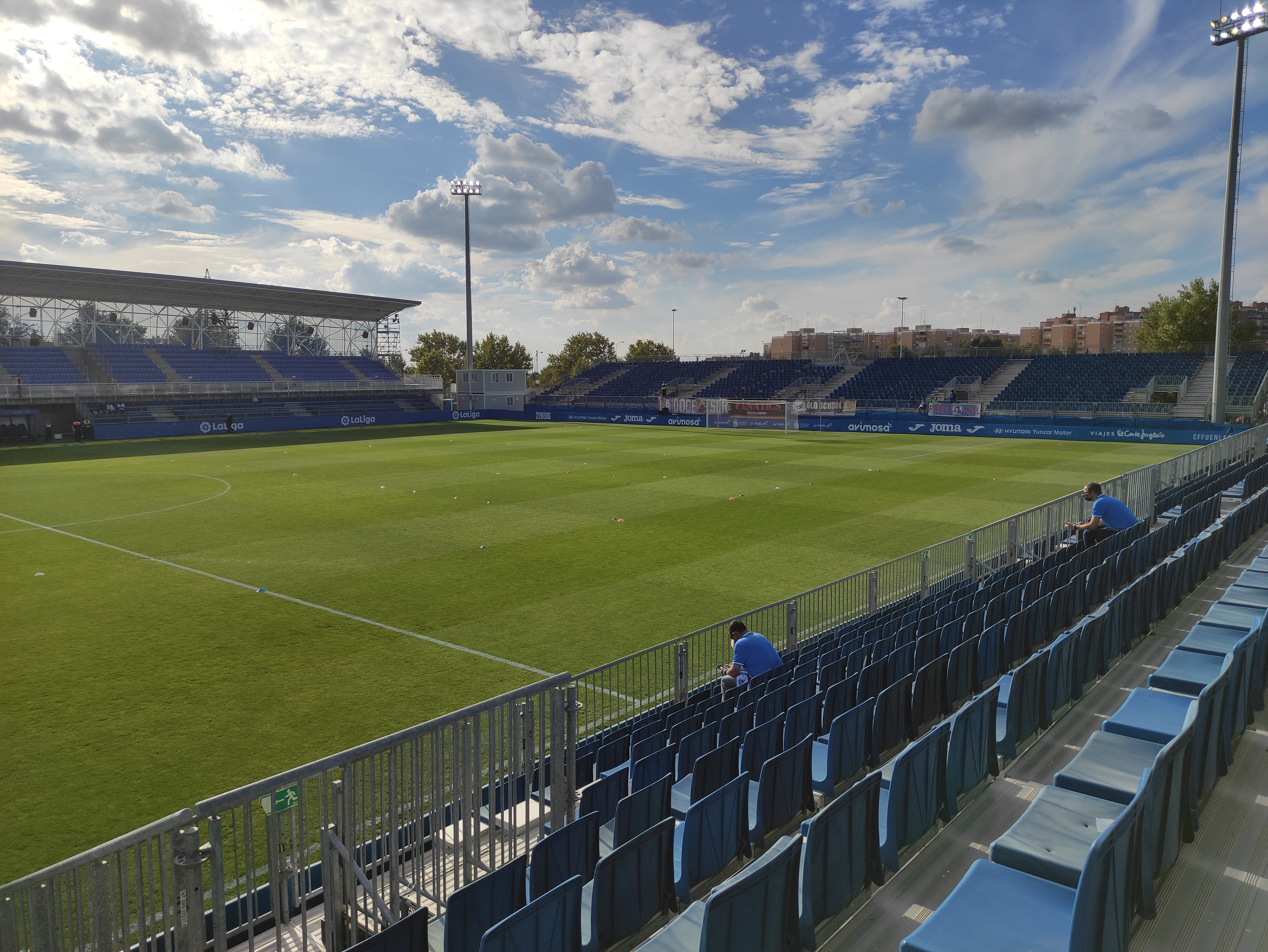
- Interactive map of Estadio Fernando Torres
- Full name: Estadio Municipal Fernando Torres
- Location: Fuenlabrada, Spain
- Coordinates: 40°17′30″N 3°49′33.95″W
- Owner: Fuenlabrada City Council
- Capacity: 5,400
- Surface: Grass
- Field size: 104x65m

Construction
- Built: 2011
- Opened: 1 September 2011
- Renovated: 2019, 2024

Tenants
- CF Fuenlabrada (2011–); Madrid CFF (2021-)

The Estadio Fernando Torres is a multi-use stadium located in Fuenlabrada, Community of Madrid, Spain. It is currently used for football matches and is the home stadium of CF Fuenlabrada.

== History ==
Built in 2011 as an honour to Fernando Torres (who was born in the city of Fuenlabrada), the stadium was inaugurated on 1 September of that year in a friendly against Atlético Madrid, Torres' first club, with his parents as honorary guests. In 2017, the stadium hosted Real Madrid in a Copa del Rey match which ended in a 2–0 victory for Los Blancos.

In June 2019, after CF Fuenlabrada's promotion to Segunda División, the stadium went through some constructions which included an adaptation to meet the LFP criteria.
