= José Fran =

Spanish footballer

Personal information
- Full name: José Francisco Agulló Sevilla
- Date of birth: 1 June 1992 (age 34)
- Place of birth: Santa Pola, Spain
- Height: 1.77 m (5 ft 10 in)
- Position: Winger

Youth career
- Villarreal
- 2010–2011: Hércules

Senior career*
| Years | Team | Apps | (Gls) |
| 2011–2012 | Santa Pola | | |
| 2012–2013 | La Nucía | 32 | (3) |
| 2013–2014 | Eldense | 32 | (5) |
| 2014–2015 | Córdoba B | 35 | (5) |
| 2015–2016 | Burgos | 34 | (7) |
| 2016–2017 | Albacete | 37 | (4) |
| 2018–2019 | Hércules | 32 | (2) |
| 2019–2020 | Fuenlabrada | 45 | (4) |
| 2020–2021 | Numancia | 23 | (2) |
| 2021–2022 | Atlético Baleares | 27 | (0) |
| 2022–2024 | UCAM Murcia | 33 | (3) |
- * Club domestic league appearances and goals as of 10 December 2023

José Francisco Agulló Sevilla (born 1 June 1992), known as José Fran, is a Spanish footballer who plays as a left winger.

== Club career ==
Born in Santa Pola, Alicante, Valencian Community, José Fran made his senior debut with hometown club Santa Pola CF in 2011, in the regional leagues. He subsequently played for Tercera División sides CF La Nucía and CD Eldense, achieving promotion with the latter.

On 14 July 2014 José Fran signed for Córdoba CF, being assigned to the reserves in Segunda División B. After being a regular starter, he moved to fellow league team Burgos CF on 15 July 2015.

On 30 June 2016, José Fran signed for Albacete Balompié, still in the third division. He contributed with 34 appearances and four goals (including play-offs) during the season, as his side achieved promotion to Segunda División.

José Fran made his professional debut on 4 September 2017, coming on as a second-half substitute for Aridane Santana in a 0–1 away loss against AD Alcorcón. On 30 December, after being rarely used, he cut ties with Alba, and signed for Hércules CF in the third division two days later.

On 4 January 2019, José Fran terminated his contract with Hércules, and signed a 18-month deal with fellow league team CF Fuenlabrada the following day.

José Fran contributed with three goals in 21 appearances (play-offs included) for Fuenla during the remainder of the season, as the club achieved a first-ever promotion to the second division. He scored his first professional goal on 6 October 2019, netting his team's second in a 2–0 home win against Sporting de Gijón.

On 14 September 2020, free agent José Fran agreed to a two-year contract with CD Numancia, recently relegated to the third division.
