= Pol Freixanet =

Spanish footballer (born 1991)

Personal information
- Full name: Pol Freixanet Viejo
- Date of birth: 22 August 1991 (age 35)
- Place of birth: Manresa, Spain
- Height: 1.91 m (6 ft 3 in)
- Position: Goalkeeper

Team information
- Current team: UE Santa Coloma
- Number: 32

Youth career
- Espanyol

Senior career*
Years	Team	Apps	(Gls)
2010–2014	Málaga B	74	(0)
2013–2014	→ Oviedo (loan)	15	(0)
2014–2015	Elche B	25	(0)
2014–2016	Elche	3	(0)
2017–2018	Fuenlabrada	41	(0)
2018–2019	Reus	2	(0)
2019–2021	Fuenlabrada	18	(0)
2022–2023	Fuenlabrada	11	(0)
2024–2025	Intercity	6	(0)
2025–	UE Santa Coloma	19	(0)
- * Club domestic league appearances and goals as of 10 June 2026

Pol Freixanet Viejo (born 22 August 1991) is a Spanish footballer who plays as a goalkeeper for Andorran club UE Santa Coloma.

== Career ==
Born in Manresa, Barcelona, Catalonia, Pol graduated with RCD Espanyol's youth setup. In the 2010 summer he moved to Málaga CF, being initially assigned to the reserves in Tercera División.

On 25 January 2012, Pol renewed with the Andalusians, signing until 2014. On 14 July of the following year, he was loaned to Segunda División B side Real Oviedo, appearing regularly.

On 9 July 2014, Pol moved to another reserve team, Elche CF Ilicitano in the third level. On 23 May 2015, he made his first team – and La Liga – debut for the latter, coming on as a late substitute for injured Przemysław Tytoń in a 0–0 away draw against Levante UD.

Pol was definitely promoted to the main squad in August 2015, mainly due to squad shortage. He was demoted to third-choice at the start of the 2016–17 season, behind Juan Carlos and Germán Parreño.

On 29 December 2016, after making no appearances during the first half of the campaign, Pol moved to CF Fuenlabrada in the third tier. On 3 July 2018, he signed a three-year contract with second division side CF Reus Deportiu, but halfway through the campaign, he left the club after it was expelled by the LFP.

On 23 July 2019, Pol returned to Fuenla, with the club now in the second division.

On 13 March 2024, Pol signed with CF Intercity.

== Career statistics ==
As of match played 10 May 2026

Appearances and goals by club, season and competition
Club	Season	League			National cup		Europe		Other		Total	
Club	Season	Division	Apps	Goals	Apps	Goals	Apps	Goals	Apps	Goals	Apps	Goals
Levante B	2011–12	La Liga	0	0	0	0			—		0	0
Levante B	2012–13	La Liga	0	0	0	0	0	0	—		0	0
Levante B	Total		0	0	0	0	0	0	—		0	0
Oviedo (loan)	2013–14	Segunda División B	15	0	1	0	—		—		16	0
Elche B	2014–15	Segunda División B	25	0	—		—		—		25	0
Elche	2014–15	La Liga	1	0	0	0	—		—		1	0
Elche	2015–16	Segunda División	2	0	1	0	—		—		3	0
Elche	Total		3	0	1	0	—		—		4	0
Fuenlabrada	2016–17	Segunda División B	13	0	—		—		5	0	18	0
Fuenlabrada	2017–18	Segunda División B	28	0	1	0	—		4	0	33	0
Fuenlabrada	Total		41	0	1	0	—		9	0	51	0
Reus	2018–19	Segunda División	2	0	2	0	—		1	0	5	0
Fuenlabrada	2019–20	Segunda División	7	0	2	0	—		—		9	0
Fuenlabrada	2020–21	Segunda División	11	0	2	0	—		—		13	0
Fuenlabrada	Total		18	0	4	0	—		—		22	0
Fuenlabrada	2022–23	Primera Federación	11	0	1	0	—		—		12	0
Intercity	2023–24	Primera Federación	1	0	—		—		—		1	0
Intercity	2024–25	Primera Federación	5	0	—		—		—		5	0
Intercity	Total		6	0	—		—		—		6	0
UE Santa Coloma	2025–26	Primera Divisió	19	0	0	0	—		—		19	0
Career total			140	0	10	0	0	0	10	0	160	0
