= Tahiru Awudu =

Ghanaian footballer

Personal information
- Date of birth: 10 March 2000 (age 26)
- Place of birth: Accra, Ghana
- Height: 1.74 m (5 ft 9 in)
- Position: Forward

Team information
- Current team: Marbella
- Number: 7

Youth career
- Konogo Shooting Stars
- 2018: Medeama

Senior career*
Years	Team	Apps	(Gls)
2018–2021	Medeama	13	(1)
2020	→ Alcobendas (loan)	8	(4)
2020–2021	→ Fuenlabrada (loan)	8	(1)
2021–2022	Badajoz	25	(1)
2022–2024	Estepona	57	(11)
2024–	Marbella	35	(6)
- * Club domestic league appearances and goals as of 10 June 2026

Tahiru Awudu (born 10 March 2000) is a Ghanaian footballer who plays for Spanish club Marbella as a forward.

== Club career ==
Born in Accra, Awudu joined Medeama SC ahead of the 2018 season from lower side Konogo Shooting Stars. He made his first team debut on 25 March 2018, playing the last five minutes of a 2–0 away loss against Bechem United FC.

Awudu scored his first professional goal on 3 May 2018, netting the equalizer in a 1–1 draw at Ebusua Dwarfs FC. On 13 August 2019, he renewed his contract with the club until 2023.

On 13 January 2020, Awudu moved abroad and agreed to a loan deal with Spanish Tercera División side Fútbol Alcobendas Sport until the end of the season. On 12 September, after a trial period, he joined CF Fuenlabrada also in a temporary deal, and was initially assigned to the reserves in the regional leagues.

Awudu made his first team debut for Fuenla on 13 September 2020, starting and scoring the opener in a 2–0 Segunda División home win against CD Lugo. The following 1 February, after being sparingly used, he cut short his loan and moved to Segunda División B side CD Badajoz. On 4 September 2022, Awudu joined Estepona.

On 5 July 2024, Awudu signed a one-season deal with Marbella in the third tier.
