= Caye Quintana =

Spanish footballer

Personal information
- Full name: Cayetano Quintana Hernández
- Date of birth: 20 December 1993 (age 32)
- Place of birth: Isla Cristina, Spain
- Height: 1.80 m (5 ft 11 in)
- Position: Forward

Team information
- Current team: Recreativo
- Number: 9

Youth career
- Isla Cristina
- 2011–2012: Recreativo

Senior career*
Years	Team	Apps	(Gls)
2010–2011	Isla Cristina	4	(0)
2012–2015	Recreativo B	64	(17)
2014	→ Écija (loan)	17	(2)
2014–2015	Recreativo	19	(4)
2015–2016	Valladolid B	33	(7)
2015–2016	Valladolid	1	(0)
2016–2017	Racing Santander	18	(2)
2017	Mallorca B	14	(4)
2017–2018	Jumilla	33	(5)
2018–2019	Recreativo	35	(16)
2019–2021	Cádiz	13	(1)
2020	→ Fuenlabrada (loan)	14	(0)
2020–2021	→ Málaga (loan)	35	(3)
2021–2023	Śląsk Wrocław	43	(2)
2023–	Recreativo	101	(30)
- * Club domestic league appearances and goals as of 7 May 2026

Cayetano 'Caye' Quintana Hernández (born 20 December 1993) is a Spanish professional footballer who plays as a forward for Recreativo de Huelva.

== Club career ==
Born in Isla Cristina, Huelva, Andalusia, Quintana started playing as a senior with lowly Isla Cristina FC in 2010. In the 2011 summer he moved to Recreativo de Huelva, being assigned to the reserves in Tercera División.

In January 2014 Quintana was loaned to Segunda División B's Écija Balompié for the remainder of the campaign. He featured regularly for the side, and returned to Recre in June.

On 23 August 2014 Quintana made his debut as a professional, coming on as a late substitute in a 0–0 home draw against Real Zaragoza in the Segunda División championship. He scored his first goal in the category on 1 March of the following year, netting the game's only in a home win against Racing de Santander.

On 10 July 2015, Quintana signed for Real Valladolid, being assigned to the B-side in the third division. He subsequently represented fellow third division sides Racing de Santander, RCD Mallorca B and FC Jumilla before returning to Recre on 2 July 2018.

On 22 June 2019, after scoring a career-best 18 goals, Quintana signed a three-year contract with Cádiz CF in the second division. The following 15 January, he moved to fellow league team CF Fuenlabrada on loan for the remainder of the campaign.

On 7 September 2020, Quintana joined fellow second division side Málaga CF also in a temporary deal.
