= 2018–19 Segunda División B =

Segunda División B
- Season: 2018–19
- Champions: Fuenlabrada
- Promoted: Fuenlabrada; Racing Santander; Ponferradina; Mirandés
- Biggest home win: Athletic Bilbao B 6–0 Izarra (3 November 2018); Cartagena 6–0 Ibiza (25 November 2018)
- Biggest away win: Atlético Sanluqueño 0–4 UCAM Murcia (4 November 2018); Almería B 1–5 Sevilla Atlético (11 November 2018); Teruel 0–4 Espanyol B (9 December 2018); UCAM Murcia 1–5 Recreativo (10 February 2019); Cultural Durango 0–4 Racing Santander (16 February 2019); Navalcarnero 1–5 Internacional (24 March 2019)
- Highest scoring: Internacional 3–6 San Sebastián de los Reyes (20 January 2019)
- Highest attendance: 26,256; Hércules 1–3 Ponferradina (23 June 2019)

The 2018–19 Segunda División B season was the 42nd since its establishment. Eighty teams participated, distributed across four groups of twenty clubs each.

== Overview before the season ==
80 teams joined the league, including three relegated from the 2017–18 Segunda División, 18 promoted from the 2017–18 Tercera División and Ibiza, that replaced Lorca FC after the latter did not fulfill the economic requirements and was banned from playing in Segunda División B.

Relegated from Segunda División

- Cultural Leonesa
- Barcelona B
- Sevilla Atlético

Promoted from Tercera División

- Almería B
- Atlético Levante
- Atlético Malagueño
- Atlético Sanluqueño
- Calahorra
- Castellón
- Conquense
- Cultural Durango
- Don Benito
- Ejea
- Espanyol B
- Gimnástica Torrelavega
- Ibiza (Note: Administratively promoted to replace Lorca FC.)
- Internacional
- Langreo
- Oviedo B
- Salamanca UDS (Note: Officially changed its name from CF Salmantino UDS.)
- Teruel
- Unionistas

== Group 1 ==
Location of teams in 2018–19 Segunda División B – Group 1
Location of teams in 2018–19 Segunda División B (Canary Islands)

=== Teams and locations ===
Team	Home city	Stadium	Capacity
Atlético Madrid B	Madrid	Cerro del Espino	3,376
Burgos	Burgos	El Plantío	12,200
Celta B	Vigo	Barreiro	4,500
Coruxo	Vigo	O Vao	1,200
Cultural Leonesa	León	Reino de León	13,346
Deportivo Fabril	A Coruña	El Mundo del Fútbol	1,000
Fuenlabrada	Fuenlabrada	Fernando Torres	2,500
Guijuelo	Guijuelo	Municipal	1,500
Internacional	Boadilla del Monte	Polideportivo Municipal	1,000
Las Palmas Atlético	Las Palmas	Anexo Gran Canaria	500
Navalcarnero	Navalcarnero	Mariano González	1,571
Ponferradina	Ponferrada	El Toralín	8,800
Pontevedra	Pontevedra	Pasarón	12,000
Rápido de Bouzas	Vigo	Baltasar Pujales	1,500
Real Madrid Castilla	Madrid	Alfredo di Stéfano	12,000
Salamanca UDS	Salamanca	Helmántico	17,341
San Sebastián de los Reyes	San Sebastián de los Reyes	Matapiñonera	3,000
Unión Adarve	Madrid	Garcia de La Mata	2,000
Unionistas	Salamanca	Pistas del Helmántico	3,000
Valladolid B	Valladolid	Anexos José Zorrilla	1,500

=== League table ===
Pos	Team	Pld	W	D	L	GF	GA	GD	Pts	Qualification or relegation
1	Fuenlabrada (O, P)	38	20	11	7	49	21	+28	71	Qualification for the group champions' playoffs and Copa del Rey
2	Ponferradina (O, P)	38	19	12	7	55	27	+28	69	Qualification for the promotion playoffs and Copa del Rey
3	Atlético Madrid B	38	19	11	8	57	32	+25	68	Qualification for the promotion playoffs
4	Real Madrid Castilla	38	18	11	9	62	45	+17	65 (Note: Real Madrid Castilla is ahead of Cultural Leonesa on head-to-head points: Cultural Leonesa–Real Madrid Castilla 1–2, Real Madrid Castilla–Cultural Leonesa 2–2)	Qualification for the promotion playoffs
5	Cultural Leonesa	38	17	14	7	56	34	+22	65	Qualification for the Copa del Rey
6	Pontevedra	38	18	8	12	45	38	+7	62	Qualification for the Copa del Rey
7	Guijuelo	38	17	8	13	35	33	+2	59	Qualification for the Copa del Rey
8	San Sebastián de los Reyes	38	15	11	12	54	45	+9	56	Qualification for the Copa del Rey
9	Unionistas	38	12	16	10	39	37	+2	52	Qualification for the Copa del Rey
10	Coruxo	38	11	17	10	38	41	−3	50	
11	Valladolid B	38	12	13	13	33	40	−7	49 (Note: Valladolid B is ahead of Salamanca UDS on head-to-head points: Salamanca UDS–Valladolid B 0–0, Valladolid B–Salamanca UDS 1–0)	
12	Salamanca UDS	38	12	13	13	40	42	−2	49	
13	Burgos	38	12	12	14	28	32	−4	48 (Note: Burgos is ahead of Internacional and Las Palmas Atlético on head-to-head points: Burgos 8 pts, Internacional 5 pts, Las Palmas Atlético 2 pts)	
14	Internacional	38	12	12	14	47	54	−7	48	
15	Las Palmas Atlético	38	12	12	14	26	33	−7	48	
16	Celta B (O)	38	12	10	16	45	48	−3	46	Qualification for the relegation playoffs
17	Rápido de Bouzas (R)	38	10	8	20	28	55	−27	38	Relegation to Tercera División
18	Unión Adarve (R)	38	9	9	20	42	62	−20	36	Relegation to Tercera División
19	Navalcarnero (R)	38	6	7	25	37	70	−33	25	Relegation to Tercera División
20	Deportivo Fabril (R)	38	5	9	24	28	55	−27	24	Relegation to Tercera División

Source: BDFútbol
Rules for classification: 1) points; 2) head-to-head points; 3) head-to-head goal difference; 4) goal difference; 5) number of goals scored
(O) Play-off winners; (P) Promoted; (R) Relegated

=== Results ===
Home \ Away	ATM	BUR	CEL	COR	CUL	FAB	FUE	GUI	INT	LPA	NAV	PNF	PNT	RAP	RMC	SAL	SSR	UAD	UNS	VAD
Atlético Madrid B	—	0–1	3–0	1–1	1–2	3–0	0–0	0–1	1–0	0–0	3–0	1–1	2–0	5–1	2–2	2–1	1–0	2–0	3–2	0–0
Burgos	1–1	—	1–0	0–1	2–2	2–1	1–0	0–0	2–2	3–0	0–0	2–0	0–1	1–0	1–2	0–0	0–2	1–1	0–1	1–0
Celta B	0–3	0–1	—	2–2	3–3	2–0	1–0	3–0	5–0	0–1	3–1	1–1	0–1	3–0	1–1	1–2	0–2	4–2	2–1	0–0
Coruxo	3–0	3–1	1–2	—	1–2	1–0	1–1	2–2	1–0	2–1	3–1	0–1	0–1	0–0	2–1	1–1	2–2	2–1	0–0	1–0
Cultural Leonesa	1–1	1–1	3–1	3–0	—	4–0	1–1	1–0	3–1	0–1	3–1	1–1	2–1	4–0	1–2	1–1	0–0	3–0	1–1	2–1
Deportivo Fabril	0–2	2–0	0–1	1–1	1–2	—	0–1	0–1	0–1	1–1	3–0	1–2	0–1	2–1	4–3	1–0	0–1	1–2	3–3	1–1
Fuenlabrada	2–0	1–0	2–1	2–0	1–0	1–0	—	3–0	4–0	1–0	2–0	3–0	0–2	2–0	0–0	5–1	1–1	4–0	1–1	2–0
Guijuelo	1–0	1–0	1–0	0–0	1–0	1–0	1–0	—	0–0	0–0	1–1	2–2	3–0	1–0	2–1	1–0	3–0	2–1	0–1	0–0
Internacional	5–1	0–1	2–0	1–1	1–1	2–2	0–0	2–1	—	2–0	1–1	0–2	3–0	1–0	2–1	0–2	3–6	1–2	0–0	2–1
Las Palmas Atlético	0–2	0–0	1–2	1–0	1–1	0–0	0–1	3–1	1–1	—	1–0	1–0	2–1	2–2	0–0	0–0	1–0	2–0	1–0	0–1
Navalcarnero	2–4	1–1	3–1	1–1	0–1	2–0	0–2	0–1	1–5	0–1	—	1–0	1–1	0–1	2–3	1–1	2–3	3–2	0–1	3–2
Ponferradina	1–0	2–0	2–2	1–1	0–0	3–0	1–0	1–0	3–0	0–0	3–0	—	1–0	3–0	3–2	0–1	3–1	2–1	3–0	5–0
Pontevedra	0–2	1–1	0–0	1–0	2–1	2–2	3–0	2–1	2–2	1–0	2–0	0–0	—	3–1	3–0	2–0	3–1	3–1	0–0	1–1
Rápido de Bouzas	0–0	0–1	0–1	0–0	1–0	2–1	0–0	2–1	0–1	2–1	0–3	2–2	1–3	—	0–3	1–0	1–1	1–1	4–1	0–0
Real Madrid Castilla	1–3	1–0	2–0	3–0	2–2	1–0	0–1	1–0	1–1	2–0	3–1	0–0	0–1	2–1	—	1–1	3–2	1–0	3–0	3–2
Salamanca UDS	0–2	0–1	3–1	0–0	2–0	0–0	1–2	2–3	2–1	2–0	3–2	0–0	3–0	0–1	3–3	—	0–3	4–3	1–1	0–0
San Sebastián de los Reyes	0–2	2–0	1–1	1–1	1–2	2–0	1–1	2–0	3–0 (Note: Match awarded to San Sebastián de los Reyes by 3–0 due to illegal alignment of Internacional. Match originally ended 3–3.)	0–2	2–0	1–0	2–1	0–1	2–2	0–1	—	2–2	1–2	1–0
Unión Adarve	1–1	1–0	0–0	3–3	0–1	1–0	0–0	0–1	1–3	1–1	3–2	1–3	3–0	1–2	0–0	0–1	1–2	—	1–0	2–1
Unionistas	1–1	0–0	1–1	4–0	0–1	0–0	3–1	1–0	0–0	3–0	1–0	1–0	1–0	3–0	1–4	1–1	1–1	0–1	—	1–1
Valladolid B	1–1	1–0	1–0	0–1	0–0	1–0	1–1	2–1	2–1	1–0	2–1	1–3	1–0	1–0	1–2	1–0	2–2	2–1	1–1	—

Source: BDFútbol
Legend: Blue = home team win; Yellow = draw; Red = away team win.

=== Top goalscorers ===
Goalscorers	Goals	Team
(Spain) Cristo González	20	Real Madrid Castilla
(Brazil) Yuri de Souza	18	Ponferradina
(Spain) Christian Perales	15	San Sebastián de los Reyes
(Spain) Sergio Castel	13	San Sebastián de los Reyes
(Nigeria) Cedric Omoigui	11	Fuenlabrada

=== Top goalkeepers ===
Goalkeeper	Goals	Matches	Average	Team
(Spain) Biel Ribas	19	36	0.53	Fuenlabrada
(Spain) Felipe Ramos	23	32	0.72	Guijuelo
(Spain) Dani Sotres	24	29	0.83	Salamanca UDS
(Spain) Mikel Saizar	31	37	0.84	Burgos
(Spain) Josep Martínez	26	30	0.87	Las Palmas Atlético

== Group 2 ==
Location of teams in 2018–19 Segunda División B – Group 2

=== Teams and locations ===
Team	Home city	Stadium	Capacity
Amorebieta	Amorebieta-Etxano	Urritxe	3,000
Arenas	Getxo	Gobela	1,221
Athletic Bilbao B	Bilbao	Lezama	2,500
Barakaldo	Barakaldo	Lasesarre	7,960
Calahorra	Calahorra	La Planilla	4,500
Cultural Durango	Durango	Tabira	3,000
Gernika	Guernica	Urbieta	3,000
Gimnástica Torrelavega	Torrelavega	El Malecón	6,007
Izarra	Estella-Lizarra	Merkatondoa	3,500
Langreo	Langreo	Ganzábal	4,024
Leioa	Leioa	Sarriena	3,500
Mirandés	Miranda de Ebro	Anduva	5,759
Oviedo B	Oviedo	El Requexón	3,000
Racing Santander	Santander	El Sardinero	22,222
Real Sociedad B	San Sebastián	José Luis Orbegozo	2,500
Real Unión	Irun	Stadium Gal	6,344
Sporting Gijón B	Gijón	Pepe Ortiz	3,000
Tudelano	Tudela	Ciudad de Tudela	11,000
UD Logroñés	Logroño	Las Gaunas	16,000
Vitoria	Laudio	Ellakuri	4,000

=== League table ===
Pos	Team	Pld	W	D	L	GF	GA	GD	Pts	Qualification or relegation
1	Racing Santander (O, P)	38	22	12	4	66	25	+41	78	Qualification for the group champions' playoffs and Copa del Rey
2	UD Logroñés	38	20	12	6	44	22	+22	72	Qualification for the promotion playoffs and Copa del Rey
3	Mirandés (O, P)	38	19	12	7	53	32	+21	69	Qualification for the promotion playoffs and Copa del Rey
4	Barakaldo	38	18	7	13	41	40	+1	61	Qualification for the promotion playoffs and Copa del Rey
5	Oviedo B	38	15	14	9	55	45	+10	59	
6	Athletic Bilbao B	38	16	9	13	67	45	+22	57	
7	Leioa	38	12	17	9	43	40	+3	53 (Note: Leioa is ahead of Amorebieta on head-to-head points: Amorebieta–Leioa 1–3, Leioa–Amorebieta 0–0)	Qualification for the Copa del Rey
8	Amorebieta	38	14	11	13	44	45	−1	53	Qualification for the Copa del Rey
9	Langreo	38	15	7	16	43	48	−5	52	Qualification for the Copa del Rey
10	Calahorra	38	13	11	14	45	52	−7	50	
11	Sporting Gijón B	38	13	10	15	42	43	−1	49	
12	Real Sociedad B	38	12	9	17	47	42	+5	45 (Note: Real Sociedad B is ahead of Izarra, Tudelano and Arenas on head-to-head points: Real Sociedad B 11 pts, Izarra 11 pts, Tudelano 6 pts, Arenas 4 pts. Real Sociedad B is ahead of Izarra on head-to-head goal difference: Real Sociedad B–Izarra 3–0, Izarra–Real Sociedad B 1–0)	
13	Izarra	38	9	18	11	33	44	−11	45	
14	Tudelano	38	10	15	13	33	42	−9	45	
15	Arenas	38	11	12	15	33	40	−7	45	
16	Real Unión (O)	38	9	17	12	39	44	−5	44	Qualification for the relegation playoffs
17	Gernika (R)	38	8	18	12	32	42	−10	42	Relegation to Tercera División
18	Vitoria (R)	38	7	14	17	34	51	−17	35	Relegation to Tercera División
19	Gimnástica Torrelavega (R)	38	6	14	18	25	44	−19	32	Relegation to Tercera División
20	Cultural Durango (R)	38	7	9	22	32	65	−33	30	Relegation to Tercera División

Source: BDFútbol
Rules for classification: 1) points; 2) head-to-head points; 3) head-to-head goal difference; 4) goal difference; 5) number of goals scored.
(O) Play-off winners; (P) Promoted; (R) Relegated

=== Results ===
Home \ Away	AMO	ARE	ATH	BAR	CAL	DUR	GER	GIM	IZA	LAN	LEI	MIR	OVI	RAC	RSO	RUN	SPO	TUD	LOG	VIT
Amorebieta	—	0–1	3–2	2–0	0–0	3–0	3–1	1–1	0–0	2–0	1–3	1–0	1–2	1–3	1–1	0–3	0–1	1–1	1–2	2–1
Arenas	1–1	—	1–0	2–1	2–1	2–0	4–1	0–1	0–1	4–0	1–1	1–0	0–3	0–1	0–2	1–0	1–1	0–1	1–3	0–0
Athletic Bilbao B	3–1	2–1	—	4–1	3–2	2–2	3–0	1–0	6–0	5–1	2–1	1–3	4–1	1–1	2–2	2–0	0–2	2–0	0–0	2–0
Barakaldo	4–3	1–0	1–1	—	1–2	1–0	1–2	1–0	1–0	1–0	0–0	1–1	2–1	0–1	2–0	3–1	0–1	1–1	0–1	2–2
Calahorra	2–0	1–1	0–3	2–1	—	2–2	3–1	1–0	2–0	2–4	0–1	2–3	1–0	0–1	0–1	1–1	1–3	1–1	2–0	2–0
Cultural Durango	0–2	0–1	3–2	0–1	1–2	—	0–1	4–4	1–2	1–0	0–3	1–4	1–3	0–4	1–3	1–1	2–1	1–0	0–0	1–1
Gernika	1–1	2–0	2–1	0–1	3–1	1–0	—	0–0	0–1	1–1	0–0	1–1	1–1	0–0	1–0	1–1	0–0	1–1	0–0	1–3
Gimnástica Torrelavega	1–2	1–1	0–0	1–3	1–1	1–2	1–0	—	0–0	0–2	1–1	1–0	2–1	0–0	1–0	1–1	1–1	0–1	0–1	0–2
Izarra	0–0	1–0	0–0	0–1	0–1	1–1	3–2	2–2	—	0–0	2–1	1–1	1–1	2–2	1–0	1–1	0–2	1–1	0–0	1–1
Langreo	3–0	1–0	0–2	0–2	2–1	4–1	1–0	1–0	4–0	—	4–1	0–1	1–0	2–1	1–0	1–1	0–2	2–0	0–0	0–0
Leioa	0–0	0–0	1–4	3–0	1–1	0–0	1–1	2–1	2–2	2–1	—	1–0	2–2	1–1	1–0	0–1	2–0	1–2	2–1	1–1
Mirandés	2–0	3–1	1–1	1–1	4–1	1–0	1–1	1–0	1–1	1–0	2–1	—	1–0	1–1	2–1	2–2	1–1	3–0	1–0	1–2
Oviedo B	0–2	3–2	2–1	0–1	1–1	3–1	0–0	2–0	2–1	2–2	1–1	1–1	—	1–1	2–1	1–1	2–0	2–1	0–1	0–0
Racing Santander	1–1	4–0	3–1	1–0	5–0	2–0	0–1	1–0	2–1	4–1	2–0	3–2	1–1	—	1–0	0–0	3–0	2–1	2–2	4–0
Real Sociedad B	1–2	1–1	1–0	3–0	1–0	3–0	1–1	0–0	3–0	1–1	1–2	0–1	2–3	0–1	—	2–1	3–1	1–1	0–1	4–2
Real Unión	1–1	1–1	1–0	1–2	0–1	0–2	1–1	1–1	0–4	4–0	1–2	0–0	2–2	0–3	2–1	—	2–0	1–0	0–0	2–0
Sporting Gijón B	0–1	1–1	3–1	2–0	2–3	1–2	2–2	0–1	0–0	2–0	0–0	0–2	1–2	3–1	2–2	0–1	—	0–0	0–2	3–2
Tudelano	0–2	0–1	3–2	0–1	0–0	1–0	0–0	2–1	1–1	2–0	1–1	1–1	1–3	1–1	1–3	2–2	1–0	—	2–1	1–0
UD Logroñés	2–0	0–0	2–1	1–1	1–1	1–0	2–0	3–0	2–1	1–0	0–0	3–0	3–4	1–0	1–1	2–0	0–2	1–0	—	1–0
Vitoria	1–2	0–0	0–0	0–1	1–1	1–1	2–2	2–0	0–1	1–3	3–1	0–2	0–0	0–2	2–1	2–1	1–2	1–1	0–2	—

Source: BDFútbol
Legend: Blue = home team win; Yellow = draw; Red = away team win.

=== Top goalscorers ===
Goalscorers	Goals	Team
(Spain) Asier Villalibre	23	Athletic Bilbao B
(Spain) Ernesto Gómez	15	Oviedo B
(Spain) Antonio Gabarre	15	Tudelano
(Spain) Mikel Orbegozo	14	Real Unión
(Spain) Eduardo Ubis	13	Calahorra

=== Top goalkeepers ===
Goalkeeper	Goals	Matches	Average	Team
(Spain) Miguel Martínez	18	35	0.51	UD Logroñés
(Spain) Iván Crespo	24	37	0.65	Racing Santander
(Spain) Limones	31	37	0.84	Mirandés
(Spain) Urtzi Iturrioz	28	32	0.88	Leioa
(Moldova) Viorel Boian	35	36	0.97	Barakaldo

== Group 3 ==
Location of teams in 2018–19 Segunda División B – Group 3

=== Teams and locations ===
Team	Home city	Stadium	Capacity
Alcoyano	Alcoy	El Collao	4,880
Atlético Baleares	Palma	Son Malferit	1,900
Atlético Levante	Valencia	Ciudad Deportiva	3,000
Badalona	Badalona	Municipal	4,170
Barcelona B	Barcelona	Mini Estadi	15,276
Castellón	Castellón de la Plana	Castalia	14,485
Conquense	Cuenca	La Fuensanta	6,700
Cornellà	Cornellà de Llobregat	Nou Camp	1,500
Ebro	Zaragoza	El Carmen	3,000
Ejea	Ejea de los Caballeros	Luchán	1,200
Espanyol B	Sant Adrià de Besòs	Dani Jarque	1,520
Hércules	Alicante	José Rico Pérez	30,000
Lleida Esportiu	Lleida	Camp d'Esports	13,000
Olot	Olot	Municipal	5,000
Ontinyent	Ontinyent	El Clariano	5,000
Peralada	Peralada	Municipal	1,500
Sabadell	Sabadell	Nova Creu Alta	11,981
Teruel	Teruel	Pinilla	5,000
Valencia Mestalla	Valencia	Antonio Puchades	3,000
Villarreal B	Villarreal	Ciudad Deportiva	4,200

=== League table ===
Pos	Team	Pld	W	D	L	GF	GA	GD	Pts	Qualification or relegation
1	Atlético Baleares	38	21	12	5	52	30	+22	75	Qualification for the group champions' playoffs and Copa del Rey
2	Hércules	38	19	10	9	36	24	+12	67	Qualification for the promotion playoffs and Copa del Rey
3	Villarreal B	38	17	11	10	54	39	+15	62	Qualification for the promotion playoffs
4	Cornellà	38	15	16	7	44	29	+15	61	Qualification for the promotion playoffs and Copa del Rey
5	Espanyol B	38	16	12	10	55	38	+17	60	
6	Lleida Esportiu	38	15	11	12	46	39	+7	56 (Note: Lleida Esportiu is ahead of Badalona on overall goal difference)	Qualification for the Copa del Rey
7	Badalona	38	14	14	10	36	32	+4	56	Qualification for the Copa del Rey
8	Barcelona B	38	14	11	13	47	39	+8	53	
9	Ebro	38	12	16	10	30	34	−4	52	Qualification for the Copa del Rey
10	Olot	38	10	18	10	33	31	+2	48	Qualification for the Copa del Rey
11	Atlético Levante	38	11	12	15	41	43	−2	45 (Note: Atlético Levante is ahead of Sabadell on head-to-head goal difference: Sabadell–Atlético Levante 2–1, Atlético Levante–Sabadell 3–1)	
12	Sabadell	38	12	9	17	36	53	−17	45	
13	Valencia Mestalla	38	11	11	16	44	50	−6	44 (Note: Valencia Mestalla is ahead of Ejea and Castellón on head-to-head points: Valencia Mestalla 7 pts, Ejea 6 pts, Castellón 4 pts)	
14	Ejea	38	10	14	14	30	36	−6	44	
15	Castellón	38	8	20	10	36	36	0	44	
16	Alcoyano (R)	38	9	16	13	33	45	−12	43	Qualification for the relegation playoffs
17	Teruel (R)	38	9	14	15	32	48	−16	41	Relegation to Tercera División
18	Conquense (R)	38	8	15	15	31	44	−13	39 (Note: Conquense is ahead of Peralada on head-to-head points: Peralada–Conquense 1–1, Conquense–Peralada 1–0)	Relegation to Tercera División
19	Peralada (R)	38	8	15	15	38	45	−7	39	Relegation to Tercera División
20	Ontinyent (W)	38	7	11	20	23	42	−19	0	Withdrew (Note: Ontinyent withdrew from competition. Their last eight matches were awarded to their rivals by 0–1.)

Source: BDFútbol
Rules for classification: 1) points; 2) head-to-head points; 3) head-to-head goal difference; 4) goal difference; 5) number of goals scored.
(R) Relegated; (W) Withdrew from the competition

=== Results ===
Home \ Away	ALC	ATB	LEV	BAD	BAR	CAS	CON	COR	EBR	EJE	ESP	HER	LLE	OLO	ONT	PER	SAB	TER	VAL	VIL
Alcoyano	—	0–0	2–3	0–1	3–1	1–1	1–1	0–2	0–1	0–0	2–2	1–0	2–1	1–1	0–0	0–0	2–1	1–1	1–1	2–2
Atlético Baleares	1–0	—	2–1	1–0	1–0	0–0	2–1	2–0	0–0	4–1	2–0	2–0	2–1	1–0	2–1	1–0	1–2	4–3	3–2	1–0
Atlético Levante	2–0	1–2	—	1–2	0–0	0–0	1–1	0–0	1–2	2–0	2–2	1–1	1–1	1–0	1–0	2–2	3–1	3–0	0–1	1–3
Badalona	2–1	0–0	2–1	—	1–2	2–0	0–0	1–0	0–1	0–0	1–3	2–1	1–1	0–0	4–1	0–1	2–0	0–0	1–0	3–2
Barcelona B	2–0	1–1	3–2	1–1	—	1–1	1–2	2–1	1–1	0–1	0–1	0–2	2–1	2–1	3–0	0–0	5–1	2–1	2–2	1–1
Castellón	3–0	1–1	1–1	2–1	2–1	—	1–0	0–0	1–1	1–0	1–2	1–2	0–1	1–1	2–0	3–1	0–1	1–1	1–1	1–1
Conquense	0–0	1–2	2–0	1–1	0–3	1–1	—	0–0	0–1	0–3	1–1	1–1	1–2	0–1	1–1	1–0	2–0	2–1	3–0	1–1
Cornellà	1–2	2–0	1–1	1–1	2–2	2–2	2–1	—	3–1	2–1	0–2	0–2	0–0	3–0	1–0^{1}	0–0	1–1	2–0	3–1	2–0
Ebro	0–0	1–3	1–1	0–0	0–1	0–0	0–0	0–2	—	0–0	1–1	0–1	0–0	0–0	1–0^{1}	0–2	1–3	2–1	2–1	2–0
Ejea	2–1	2–1	0–1	0–0	1–0	2–0	0–1	0–0	0–0	—	1–1	0–0	4–4	0–0	2–1	2–2	2–1	0–0	3–1	0–2
Espanyol B	0–1	0–2	2–1	2–0	1–0	2–2	4–0	0–0	0–0	2–0	—	1–2	1–1	0–0	0–1	3–1	3–0	3–0	1–3	0–1
Hércules	0–0	0–1	0–1	1–0	0–0	1–1	1–0	1–0	2–3	2–0	1–0	—	0–0	1–0	2–1	1–0	2–0	0–2	0–1	2–1
Lleida Esportiu	2–0	3–2	2–0	0–0	1–2	0–1	3–0	1–1	2–1	0–1	2–3	0–1	—	0–1	0–1	2–0	3–2	0–2	2–0	2–1
Olot	1–1	0–0	2–2	4–0	1–1	1–1	2–0	1–1	0–0	1–0	0–1	0–0	0–1	—	0–0	2–1	0–2	4–1	0–3	2–2
Ontinyent	0–0	1–1	0–1^{1}	0–1^{1}	0–3	2–1	1–2	1–2	0–2	1–0	0–1^{1}	1–0	0–0	0–0	—	0–1^{1}	3–1	0–1^{1}	2–2	1–2
Peralada	2–3	2–2	0–0	1–2	2–0	2–1	1–1	2–2	1–2	2–1	2–2	0–1	1–2	0–1	0–1	—	2–0	0–0	1–1	0–1
Sabadell	0–1	0–0	2–1	0–0	0–1	2–1	1–0	1–1	0–0	1–0	3–2	2–1	1–0	0–0	0–2	2–2	—	2–0	0–1	1–1
Teruel	4–1	1–1	2–1	0–0	1–0	0–0	0–0	0–2	4–1	0–0	0–4	0–0	0–0	1–4	1–1	0–1	2–0	—	1–0	0–2
Valencia Mestalla	2–3	1–1	0–1	2–4	1–0	1–0	2–2	1–2	2–0	2–1	1–0	0–0	2–3	2–0	1–0^{1}	0–1	1–1	1–1	—	0–1
Villarreal B	2–0	2–1	1–0	1–0	2–1	0–0	3–2	0–0	1–2	0–0	3–1	1–2	3–1	1–2	0–0	3–3	4–1	3–0	0–1	—

Source: BDFútbol
Legend: Blue = home team win; Yellow = draw; Red = away team win.
- ^{1} The opponents of Ontinyent since the round 31 awarded a 1–0 w/o win each.

=== Top goalscorers ===
Goalscorers	Goals	Team
(Spain) Pedro Martín	16	Lleida Esportiu
(Spain) Víctor Campuzano	15	Espanyol B
(Spain) Juanto Ortuño	14	Lleida Esportiu
(Spain) Jairo Cárcaba	14	Castellón
(Spain) Simón Moreno	13	Villarreal B

=== Top goalkeepers ===
Goalkeeper	Goals	Matches	Average	Team
(Spain) Ismael Falcón	23	37	0.62	Hércules
(Spain) Miguel Morales	24	32	0.75	Badalona
(Spain) Ramón Juan	26	33	0.79	Cornellà
(Germany) Carl Klaus	30	37	0.81	Atlético Baleares
(Spain) Xavier Ginard	29	34	0.85	Olot

== Group 4 ==
Location of teams in 2018–19 Segunda División B – Group 4

=== Teams and locations ===
Team	Home city	Stadium	Capacity
Almería B	Almería	Mediterráneo	15,200
Atlético Malagueño	Málaga	El Viso	1,300
Atlético Sanluqueño	Sanlúcar de Barrameda	El Palmar	5,000
Badajoz	Badajoz	Nuevo Vivero	15,198
Cartagena	Cartagena	Cartagonova	15,105
Don Benito	Don Benito	Vicente Sanz	3,500
El Ejido	El Ejido	Santo Domingo	7,870
Ibiza	Ibiza	Can Misses	4,500
Jumilla	Jumilla	La Hoya	3,000
Linense	La Línea de la Concepción	Municipal	12,000
Marbella	Marbella	Municipal	8,000
Melilla	Melilla	Álvarez Claro	12,000
Murcia	Murcia	Nueva Condomina	31,179
Recreativo	Huelva	Nuevo Colombino	21,670
Recreativo Granada	Granada	Ciudad Deportiva	2,500
San Fernando	San Fernando	Iberoamericano	12,000
Sevilla Atlético	Seville	Jesús Navas	8,000
Talavera de la Reina	Talavera de la Reina	El Prado	6,000
UCAM Murcia	Murcia	La Condomina	6,000
Villanovense	Villanueva de la Serena	Villanovense	2,500

=== League table ===
Pos	Team	Pld	W	D	L	GF	GA	GD	Pts	Qualification or relegation
1	Recreativo	38	23	9	6	50	23	+27	78	Qualification for the group champions' playoffs and Copa del Rey
2	Cartagena	38	22	9	7	62	27	+35	75	Qualification for the promotion playoffs and Copa del Rey
3	Melilla	38	21	9	8	55	32	+23	72	Qualification for the promotion playoffs and Copa del Rey
4	Badajoz	38	19	9	10	44	31	+13	66 (Note: Badajoz is ahead of UCAM Murcia on head-to-head points: Badajoz–UCAM Murcia 1–0, UCAM Murcia–Badajoz 1–2)	Qualification for the promotion playoffs and Copa del Rey
5	UCAM Murcia	38	20	6	12	54	40	+14	66	Qualification for the Copa del Rey
6	Ibiza	38	17	12	9	41	31	+10	63	Qualification for the Copa del Rey
7	Marbella	38	17	9	12	42	33	+9	60 (Note: Marbella is ahead of San Fernando on overall goal difference)	Qualification for the Copa del Rey
8	San Fernando	38	17	9	12	44	36	+8	60	
9	Talavera de la Reina	38	14	8	16	34	34	0	50	
10	Sevilla Atlético	38	13	9	16	37	46	−9	48 (Note: Sevilla Atlético is ahead of Murcia on head-to-head points: Murcia–Sevilla Atlético 0–0, Sevilla Atlético–Murcia 2–0)	
11	Murcia	38	11	15	12	32	32	0	48	
12	Linense	38	11	13	14	33	33	0	46 (Note: Linense is ahead of Atlético Sanluqueño on head-to-head points: Atlético Sanluqueño–Linense 0–0, Linense–Atlético Sanluqueño 1–0)	
13	Atlético Sanluqueño	38	12	10	16	32	48	−16	46	
14	Recreativo Granada	38	11	12	15	37	42	−5	45	
15	Don Benito	38	11	11	16	38	49	−11	44	
16	Jumilla (Note: Jumilla relegated to Preferente Autonómica (5th tier) due to not paying its players.) (R)	38	11	10	17	31	42	−11	43	Qualification for the relegation playoffs
17	El Ejido (R)	38	10	9	19	29	47	−18	39	Relegation to Tercera División
18	Villanovense (R)	38	7	17	14	32	40	−8	38	Relegation to Tercera División
19	Atlético Malagueño (R)	38	7	8	23	27	54	−27	29	Relegation to Tercera División
20	Almería B (R)	38	5	8	25	27	61	−34	23	Relegation to Tercera División

Source: BDFútbol
Rules for classification: 1) points; 2) head-to-head points; 3) head-to-head goal difference; 4) goal difference; 5) number of goals scored.
(R) Relegated

=== Results ===
Home \ Away	ALM	MGA	SLU	BAD	CAR	DBE	EJI	IBI	JUM	LIN	MAR	MEL	MUR	REC	GRA	SFE	SAT	TAL	UCM	VNO
Almería B	—	1–0	1–0	1–2	2–2	4–1	2–0	0–1	0–1	0–0	2–1	1–4	1–3	1–2	0–0	1–2	1–5	2–2	0–1	0–0
Atlético Malagueño	2–0	—	2–1	2–2	0–2	0–2	1–1	1–1	0–0	0–1	0–1	0–1	1–0	0–1	0–1	0–1	3–0	0–1	0–3	2–4
Atlético Sanluqueño	2–1	1–1	—	1–0	3–1	2–1	2–1	0–1	1–0	0–0	2–0	0–1	1–2	0–3	1–1	1–2	1–0	1–0	0–4	2–2
Badajoz	1–1	4–0	4–0	—	1–0	2–1	2–2	1–1	1–0	0–2	0–0	1–0	0–0	0–1	1–0	2–0	2–0	0–0	1–0	2–1
Cartagena	4–1	3–1	3–0	1–0	—	4–0	3–0	6–0	1–0	1–0	2–0	0–2	1–1	0–0	2–3	2–0	0–0	1–0	1–2	1–1
Don Benito	1–0	2–0	2–2	1–2	0–0	—	0–1	2–2	2–0	2–2	0–1	0–0	0–0	0–2	1–2	4–3	0–1	0–1	1–1	2–2
El Ejido	2–0	0–0	0–2	0–2	1–0	0–1	—	0–0	2–2	3–2	0–0	1–1	0–2	0–1	2–0	0–2	1–0	0–1	2–0	2–1
Ibiza	2–1	2–1	0–1	0–1	1–0	0–1	1–3	—	4–1	0–0	4–0	2–1	3–2	1–0	1–1	1–1	2–0	1–0	2–0	0–0
Jumilla	1–0	0–0	2–1	3–0	1–3	0–2	1–0	0–0	—	2–1	1–2	0–0	1–2	0–1	0–0	0–1	1–2	1–0	1–3	1–1
Linense	0–0	2–0	1–0	1–1	0–1	1–3	3–0	0–0	1–1	—	3–0	1–2	0–0	2–0	1–0	0–1	1–1	0–1	0–2	1–1
Marbella	2–0	3–1	1–0	0–0	0–2	4–0	1–2	3–1	0–3	2–0	—	2–0	0–0	1–0	0–2	2–0	4–0	2–0	2–0	2–1
Melilla	4–0	2–1	4–0	2–1	1–2	3–0	1–0	0–1	2–0	3–1	2–1	—	1–2	1–1	1–1	3–1	2–1	1–0	2–2	0–0
Murcia	0–0	2–0	1–0	0–0	1–2	0–1	1–1	1–0	1–1	0–2	1–1	2–0	—	2–2	0–1	1–1	0–0	1–0	0–1	0–0
Recreativo	2–0	2–1	1–1	2–1	0–0	1–0	2–0	0–0	1–1	1–0	0–0	0–1	2–0	—	2–1	1–1	2–1	1–0	0–1	1–0
Recreativo Granada	3–2	0–0	0–0	0–2	0–2	0–1	1–1	0–3	0–1	3–2	0–0	5–1	1–2	0–2	—	1–1	1–2	4–1	0–1	2–1
San Fernando	1–0	1–2	2–2	1–0	1–2	2–1	2–1	2–0	0–1	0–1	2–0	0–0	2–1	1–0	0–0	—	3–0	1–2	2–0	2–0
Sevilla Atlético	1–0	2–3	0–0	2–1	0–1	1–1	1–0	0–1	3–1	2–0	1–1	0–0	2–0	1–2	1–1	2–1	—	0–0	2–1	2–1
Talavera de la Reina	2–0	0–1	3–0	4–0	2–2	0–0	2–0	0–2	2–0	0–0	0–3	0–1	1–0	2–3	0–2	0–0	2–1	—	0–0	1–0
UCAM Murcia	2–0	3–1	0–0	1–2	1–3	2–1	3–0	1–1	1–2	0–1	1–0	1–3	2–1	1–5	3–0	2–1	3–0	2–1	—	2–1
Villanovense	2–1	1–0	0–1	1–2	1–1	1–1	1–0	0–0	1–0	0–0	0–0	1–2	0–0	1–3	1–0	0–0	2–0	1–3	1–1	—

Source: BDFútbol
Legend: Blue = home team win; Yellow = draw; Red = away team win.

=== Top goalscorers ===
Goalscorers	Goals	Team
(Spain) Elady Zorrilla	19	Cartagena
(Spain) Caye Quintana	16	Recreativo
(Spain) Óscar García	14	Melilla
(Spain) Juanma García	12	Marbella
(Spain) Isaac Aketxe	11	Cartagena

=== Top goalkeepers ===
Goalkeeper	Goals	Matches	Average	Team
(Portugal) João Costa	15	28	0.54	Cartagena
(Spain) Marc Martínez	23	38	0.61	Recreativo
(Spain) Gianni Cassaro	24	33	0.73	Talavera de la Reina
(Spain) Rubén Gálvez	28	35	0.8	San Fernando
(Spain) Kike Royo	29	35	0.83	Badajoz

== Average attendances ==
This is a list of attendance data of the teams that give an official number. They include playoffs games:

Pos	Team	Total	High	Low	Average	Change
1	Racing Santander	189,886	21,487	6,192	9,042	+27.2%
2	Murcia	140,416	14,157	3,785	7,390	−9.0%
3	Cultural Leonesa	112,728	11,006	2,000	5,933	−30.8%^{1}
4	Ponferradina	123,409	8,432	4,284	5,610	+89.5%
5	UD Logroñés	79,386	10,754	2,697	3,780	+21.1%
6	Sabadell	47,908	5,644	1,493	2,521	+34.7%
7	Mirandés	50,376	3,416	1,852	2,399	−22.4%
8	UCAM Murcia	40,404	5,122	1,020	2,127	−14.6%
9	Unionistas	38,080	3,647	1,372	2,004	n/a^{2}
10	Barcelona B	26,544	2,718	775	1,397	−47.3%^{1}
11	Olot	21,835	2,673	682	1,149	+7.6%
12	Real Madrid Castilla	22,456	3,280	219	1,123	+34.5%
13	El Ejido	19,370	1,603	564	1,019	−7.5%
14	Badalona	17,981	2,018	400	946	n/a
15	Langreo	15,643	2,847	514	823	+8.1%^{2}

Notes:
1: Team played last season in Segunda División.
2: Team played last season in Tercera División.
