= 2020–21 CD Mirandés season =

CD Mirandés
2020–21 season
- President: Alfredo de Miguel Crespo
- Head coach: José Alberto
- Stadium: Anduva
- Segunda División: 10th
- Copa del Rey: First round
- Top goalscorer: League: Erik Jirka (5); All: Erik Jirka (5)
Home colours	Away colours	Third colours

The 2020–21 CD Mirandés season was the club's 94th season in existence and its second consecutive season in the second division of Spanish football. In addition to the domestic league, Mirandés participated in this season's edition of the Copa del Rey. The season covered the period from 21 July 2020 to 30 June 2021.

== Players ==
=== First-team squad ===
As of 1 February 2021

Note: Flags indicate national team as defined under FIFA eligibility rules; some limited exceptions apply. Players may hold more than one non-FIFA nationality.

No.	Pos.	Nation	Player
1	GK	ESP	Limones (captain)
2	DF	DOM	Carlos Julio (vice-captain)
3	DF	ESP	Javi Jiménez
4	DF	ESP	Juan Berrocal (on loan from Sevilla)
5	DF	ESP	Daniel Vivian (on loan from Athletic Bilbao)
6	MF	ESP	Álex López
7	MF	ESP	Iván Martín (on loan from Villarreal)
8	MF	ESP	Antonio Caballero
9	FW	ESP	Cristo González (on loan from Udinese)
10	FW	MAR	Moha (on loan from Espanyol)
11	MF	SVK	Erik Jirka (on loan from Red Star Belgrade)
13	GK	ESP	Raúl Lizoain
14	MF	ESP	Javi Muñoz (on loan from Alavés)

No.	Pos.	Nation	Player
16	DF	ESP	Genaro Rodríguez
17	FW	POR	Ricardo Schutte (on loan from Rio Ave)
18	FW	ESP	Mario Barco
19	FW	ESP	Simón Moreno (on loan from Villarreal)
20	DF	ESP	Víctor Gómez (on loan from Espanyol)
21	DF	BIH	Bojan Letić
22	MF	SEN	Nicolas Jackson (on loan from Villarreal)
23	MF	FRA	Naïs Djouahra (on loan from Real Sociedad)
24	DF	ESP	Pablo Trigueros
28	MF	ESP	Víctor Meseguer
31	GK	ESP	Alberto González
36	MF	ESP	Pablo Martínez (on loan from Levante)
39	FW	ESP	Sergio Moreno (on loan from Rayo Vallecano)

=== Reserve team ===
Note: Flags indicate national team as defined under FIFA eligibility rules; some limited exceptions apply. Players may hold more than one non-FIFA nationality.

No.	Pos.	Nation	Player
26	DF	ESP	Mario Espinar
27	DF	ESP	Mario García
29	FW	ESP	Fredi Sualdea
30	DF	ESP	Carles Marco

No.	Pos.	Nation	Player
32	DF	ESP	Rodrigo Esteban
33	MF	ESP	Juan de la Mata
34	MF	ESP	David Acedo

== Transfers ==
=== In ===
No.	Pos	Player	Transferred from	Fee	Date	Source
15			TBD		1 July 2020	

=== Out ===
No.	Pos	Player	Transferred to	Fee	Date	Source
15			TBD		1 July 2020	

== Pre-season and friendlies ==
Win Draw Loss

26 August 2020 Friendly	Mirandés	0–2	Osasuna	Miranda de Ebro, Spain
19:30 CEST (UTC+2)			Roncaglia 50'; Gallego 85'	Stadium: Estadio Municipal de Anduva

29 August 2020 Friendly	Oviedo	0–0	Mirandés	Oviedo, Spain
18:00 CEST (UTC+2)				Stadium: Estadio Carlos Tartiere

== Competitions ==
=== Overview ===
Competition	First match	Last match	Starting round	Final position	Record							
Competition	First match	Last match	Starting round	Final position	Pld	W	D	L	GF	GA	GD	Win %
Segunda División	13 September 2020	30 May 2021	Matchday 1	10th	42	14	12	16	38	41	−3	33.33
Copa del Rey	16 December 2020		First round	First round	1	0	0	1	0	1	−1	0.00
Total					43	14	12	17	38	42	−4	32.56

Source: Soccerway

=== Segunda División ===
==== League table ====
Pos	Team	Pld	W	D	L	GF	GA	GD	Pts
8	Ponferradina	42	15	12	15	45	50	−5	57
9	Las Palmas	42	14	14	14	46	53	−7	56
10	Mirandés	42	14	12	16	38	41	−3	54 (Note: Head-to-head points: Mirandés: 6, Fuenlabrada: 0)
11	Fuenlabrada	42	12	18	12	45	46	−1	54
12	Málaga	42	14	11	17	37	47	−10	53

Source: LaLiga
Rules for classification: 1) points; 2) head-to-head points; 3) head-to-head goal difference; 4) goal difference; 5) number of goals scored

==== Results summary ====
Overall								Home						Away					
Pld	W	D	L	GF	GA	GD	Pts	W	D	L	GF	GA	GD	W	D	L	GF	GA	GD
42	14	12	16	38	41	−3	54	6	10	5	19	18	+1	8	2	11	19	23	−4

Source: La Liga

==== Results by round ====
Round	1	2	3	4	5	6	7	8	9	10	11	12	13	14	15	16	17	18	19	20	21	22	23	24	25	26	27	28	29	30	31	32	33	34	35	36	37	38	39	40	41	42
Ground	H	H	A	H	A	H	A	A	H	A	H	A	H	A	H	A	H	A	H	A	H	A	H	A	H	A	H	A	H	A	A	H	A	H	A	H	A	H	A	H	A	H
Result	D	D	W	L	W	D	L	D	W	L	W	L	W	W	D	L	D	W	L	L	L	W	W	W	D	L	W	L	D	L	W	D	W	L	L	D	L	W	L	D	D	L
Position	10	12	8	11	8	9	11	12	7	13	9	13	8	8	7	9	10	8	9	9	13	11	8	8	7	9	8	8	8	9	12	13	10	12	10	10	10	9	9	9	9	10

Source: La Liga
A = Away; H = Home; W = Win; D = Draw; L = Loss

==== Matches ====
The league fixtures were announced on 31 August 2020.

13 September 2020 1	Mirandés	0–0	Alcorcón	Miranda de Ebro
18:15 CEST (UTC+2)		Report		Stadium: Estadio Municipal de Anduva; Attendance: 0 (Note: The match was played behind closed doors due to the COVID-19 pandemic in Spain.); Referee: Jon Ander González Esteban

19 September 2020 2	Mirandés	1–1	Oviedo	Miranda de Ebro
16:00 CEST (UTC+2)	Martín 58'	Report	Sangalli 90+1'	Stadium: Estadio Municipal de Anduva; Attendance: 0 Referee: Iñaki Vicandi Garrido

27 September 2020 3	Tenerife	1–2	Mirandés	Santa Cruz de Tenerife
18:15 CEST (UTC+2)		Report		Stadium: Heliodoro Rodríguez López; Attendance: 0 Referee: David Gálvez Rascón

3 October 2020 4	Mirandés	0–1	Ponferradina	Miranda de Ebro
16:00 CEST (UTC+2)		Report		Stadium: Estadio Municipal de Anduva; Attendance: 0 Referee: Daniel Ocón Arráiz

10 October 2020 5	Sabadell	0–2	Mirandés	Sabadell
13:00 CEST (UTC+2)	Cornud (yellow card) 80'; Rey (yellow card) 90+1'	Report	Martínez 75'; Gómez 78'	Stadium: Estadi de la Nova Creu Alta; Attendance: 0 Referee: Iosu Galech Apezteguia

18 October 2020 6	Mirandés	0–0	Mallorca	Miranda de Ebro
18:15 CEST (UTC+2)	Jiménez (yellow card) 56'; Muñoz (yellow card) 86'	Report	Sastre (yellow card) 8' (yellow-red card) 75'; Oliván (yellow card) 18'; Amath (yellow card) 26'; Raíllo (yellow card) 49'	Stadium: Estadio Municipal de Anduva; Attendance: 0 Referee: Rafael Sánchez López

21 October 2020 7	Espanyol	2–0	Mirandés	Cornellà de Llobregat
16:30 CEST (UTC+2)	Mérida 3'; Puado 43', (yellow card) 45'	Report		Stadium: RCDE Stadium; Attendance: 0 Referee: Álvaro Moreno Aragón

25 October 2020 8	Málaga	1–1	Mirandés	Málaga
20:30 CEST (UTC+2)		Report		Stadium: La Rosaleda; Attendance: 0 Referee: Iñaki Vicandi Garrido

29 October 2020 9	Mirandés	1–0	Zaragoza	Miranda de Ebro
19:00 CET (UTC+1)		Report		Stadium: Estadio Municipal de Anduva; Attendance: 0 Referee: Aitor Gorostegui Fernández-Ortega

1 November 2020 10	Leganés	1–0	Mirandés	Leganés
14:00 CET (UTC+1)	Palencia (yellow card) 45'; Arnaiz 49'; Santos (yellow card) 90+1'	Report	Berrocal (yellow card) 11'; Jiménez (yellow card) 54'	Stadium: Estadio Municipal de Butarque; Attendance: 0 Referee: Jon Ander González Esteban

7 November 2020 11	Mirandés	1–0	Sporting Gijón	Miranda de Ebro
18:15 CET (UTC+1)	Moreno 13'; Vivian (yellow card) 45+1'; Gómez (yellow card) 90+4'	Report	Vázquez (yellow card) 82'; López (yellow card) 90+1'	Stadium: Estadio Municipal de Anduva; Attendance: 0 Referee: Rubén Ávalos Barrera

14 November 2020 12	Almería	2–1	Mirandés	Almería
16:15 CET (UTC+1)	Villalba 17'; Sadiq 45+1'; Petrović (yellow card) 90'	Report	Martínez 42', (yellow card) 66'; Gómez (yellow card) 57'; Muñoz (yellow card) 80'; Vivian (yellow card) 89'	Stadium: Estadio de los Juegos Mediterráneos; Attendance: 0 Referee: Rafael Sánchez López

21 November 2020 13	Mirandés	4–1	Cartagena	Miranda de Ebro
16:00 CET (UTC+1)		Report		Stadium: Estadio Municipal de Anduva; Attendance: 0 Referee: Iosu Galech Apezteguía

25 November 2020 14	Las Palmas	0–2	Mirandés	Las Palmas
19:00 CET (UTC+1)		Report		Stadium: Estadio Gran Canaria; Attendance: 0 Referee: Saúl Ais Reig

28 November 2020 15	Mirandés	1–1	Castellón	Miranda de Ebro
20:30 CET (UTC+1)		Report		Stadium: Estadio Municipal de Anduva; Attendance: 0 Referee: Gorka Sagués Oscoz

1 December 2020 16	Girona	1–0	Mirandés	Girona
21:30 CET (UTC+1)		Report		Stadium: Montilivi; Attendance: 0 Referee: Francisco Hernández Maeso

5 December 2020 17	Mirandés	0–0	Lugo	Miranda de Ebro
18:15 CET (UTC+1)		Report		Stadium: Estadio Municipal de Anduva; Attendance: 0 Referee: Álvaro Moreno Aragón

12 December 2020 18	Fuenlabrada	0–1	Mirandés	Fuenlabrada
20:30 CET (UTC+1)		Report		Stadium: Fernando Torres; Attendance: 0 Referee: Dámaso Arcediano Monescillo

21 December 2020 19	Mirandés	0–2	Albacete	Miranda de Ebro
19:00 CET (UTC+1)	Gómez (yellow card) 69'; Muñoz (yellow card) 82'	Report	Diamanka 32', (yellow card) 70'; Peña 42'; Boyomo (yellow card) 56'; Ortuño (yellow card) 90+2'	Stadium: Estadio Municipal de Anduva; Attendance: 0 Referee: Rafael Sánchez López

2 January 2021 20	UD Logroñés	2–1	Mirandés	Logroño
18:15 CET (UTC+1)		Report		Stadium: Las Gaunas; Attendance: 0 Referee: Iosu Galech Apezteguía

19 January 2021 21	Mirandés	0–2	Rayo Vallecano	Miranda de Ebro
19:00 CET (UTC+1)		Report		Stadium: Estadio Municipal de Anduva; Attendance: 0 Referee: José Antonio López Toca

25 January 2021 22	Cartagena	0–2	Mirandés	Cartagena
21:00 CET (UTC+1)		Report		Stadium: Cartagonova; Attendance: 0 Referee: Miguel Ángel Ortiz Arias

31 January 2021 23	Mirandés	2–0	Las Palmas	Miranda de Ebro
18:15 CET (UTC+1)		Report		Stadium: Estadio Municipal de Anduva; Attendance: 0 Referee: David Gálvez Rascón

7 February 2021 24	Castellón	0–1	Mirandés	Castellón de la Plana
18:15 CET (UTC+1)		Report		Stadium: Nou Estadi Castàlia; Attendance: 0 Referee: Francisco José Hernández Maeso

13 February 2021 25	Mirandés	3–3	Girona	Miranda de Ebro
18:15 CET (UTC+1)		Report		Stadium: Estadio Municipal de Anduva; Attendance: 0 Referee: Luis Mario Milla Alvendiz

19 February 2021 26	Ponferradina	1–0	Mirandés	Ponferrada
21:00 CET (UTC+1)		Report		Stadium: El Toralín; Attendance: 0 Referee: Eduardo Prieto Iglesias

1 March 2021 27	Mirandés	1–0	Málaga	Miranda de Ebro
19:00 CET (UTC+1)		Report		Stadium: Estadio Municipal de Anduva; Attendance: 0 Referee: Iñaki Vicandi Garrido

8 March 2021 28	Alcorcón	4–0	Mirandés	Alcorcón
19:00 CET (UTC+1)	Xisco 46' 76'; Bellvís 61'; Óscar 80'; García (yellow card) 90+4'	Report	Berrocal (yellow card) 36'; Muñoz (yellow card) 71'; Barco (yellow card) 90+2'	Stadium: Santo Domingo; Attendance: 0 Referee: Gorka Sagues Oscoz

13 March 2021 29	Mirandés	2–2	Espanyol	Miranda de Ebro
21:00 CET (UTC+1)	Meseguer 5'; Moreno 89'	Report	De Tomás 32'; Darder (yellow card) 73'; Melamed 90+5'	Stadium: Estadio Municipal de Anduva; Attendance: 0 Referee: Jon Ander González Esteban

22 March 2021 30	Zaragoza	1–0	Mirandés	Zaragoza
21:00 CET (UTC+1)	Peybernes 6'; Alegría (penalty missed) 78'; Jair (yellow card) 83'	Report	Jiménez (yellow card) 71'; Gómez (yellow card) 78'; Lizoain (yellow card) 84'	Stadium: La Romareda; Attendance: 0 Referee: Daniel Jesús Trujillo Suárez

4 April 2021 33	Sporting Gijón	1–2	Mirandés	Gijón
14:00 CEST (UTC+2)	Đurđević 54' (pen.)	Report	Moha 74'; Martín 81'	Stadium: El Molinón; Attendance: 0 Referee: Aitor Gorostegui Fernández-Ortega

11 April 2021 34	Mirandés	0–1	UD Logroñés	Miranda de Ebro
18:15 CEST (UTC+2)		Report		Stadium: Estadio Municipal de Anduva; Attendance: 0 Referee: Gorka Sagués Oscoz

14 April 2021 31	Rayo Vallecano	0–1	Mirandés	Madrid
19:00 CEST (UTC+2)	Á. García (yellow card) 56'; Valentín (yellow card) 90'; Hernández (yellow card) 90+3'	Report	González 72'	Stadium: Vallecas; Attendance: 0 Referee: Rafael Sánchez López

18 April 2021 35	Albacete	1–0	Mirandés	Albacete
14:00 CEST (UTC+2)		Report		Stadium: Carlos Belmonte; Attendance: 0 Referee: Alejandro Muñiz Ruiz

21 April 2021 32	Mirandés	0–0	Tenerife	Miranda de Ebro
19:00 CEST (UTC+2)		Report		Stadium: Estadio Municipal de Anduva; Attendance: 0 Referee: Iosu Galech Apezteguía

25 April 2021 36	Mirandés	1–1	Almería	Miranda de Ebro
16:00 CEST (UTC+2)	Berrocal 12', (yellow card) 48'; Martínez (yellow card) 35'	Report	Robertone (yellow card) 21'; Corpas 37' (pen.); Costa (yellow card) 41'; Fernandes (yellow card) 53'; Cuenca (yellow card) 78'; Akieme (yellow card) 90+4'	Stadium: Estadio Municipal de Anduva; Attendance: 0 Referee: Francisco José Hernández Maeso

1 May 2021 37	Mallorca	2–1	Mirandés	Palma
18:15 CEST (UTC+2)	Abdón 44'; Vivian 51' (o.g.); Reina (yellow card) 83'; Rodríguez (yellow card) 84'; Junior (yellow card) 90+2'	Report	Berrocal (yellow card) 22'; Vivian (yellow card) 42'; Gómez (yellow card) 45'; Djouahra 64'	Stadium: Visit Mallorca Stadium; Attendance: 0 Referee: José Antonio López Toca

9 May 2021 38	Mirandés	2–1	Fuenlabrada	Miranda de Ebro
14:00 CEST (UTC+2)	Muñoz 34'; Caballero (yellow card) 49'; Djouahra 66'; Vivian (penalty missed) 76'; Barco (yellow card) 90+1'; Martínez (yellow card) 90+6'	Report	Kanté 26', (yellow card) 90+2'; Diéguez (yellow card) 44'; Pulido (yellow card) 74'; Nteka (yellow card) 90+6'	Stadium: Estadio Municipal de Anduva; Attendance: 0 Referee: Eduardo Prieto Iglesias

15 May 2021 39	Lugo	2–1	Mirandés	Lugo
18:30 CEST (UTC+2)	Venâncio (yellow card) 63'; Valentín (yellow card) 66'; Barreiro 87' (pen.), 90+2' (pen.)	Report	Martínez 40'; Djouahra (yellow card) 65'; Jiménez (yellow card) 85'; Genaro (yellow card) 88'; Lizoain (yellow card) 90+1'	Stadium: Estadio Anxo Carro; Attendance: 0 Referee: Saúl Ais Reig

19 May 2021 40	Mirandés	0–0	Leganés	Miranda de Ebro
21:30 CEST (UTC+2)		Report		Stadium: Estadio Municipal de Anduva; Attendance: 0 Referee: Juan Luis Pulido Santana

24 May 2021 41	Oviedo	1–1	Mirandés	Oviedo
18:30 CEST (UTC+2)	Tejera 4', (yellow card) 47'; González (yellow card) 30'; Rodri (yellow card) 61'	Report	Djouahra 54'; Meseguer (yellow card) 75'	Stadium: Carlos Tartiere; Attendance: 0 Referee: Iñaki Vicandi Garrido

30 May 2021 42	Mirandés	0–2	Sabadell	Miranda de Ebro
21:00 CEST (UTC+2)	Trigueros (yellow card) 70'	Report	Hernández 65'; Stoichkov 79'	Stadium: Estadio Municipal de Anduva; Attendance: 0 Referee: Javier Iglesias Villanueva

=== Copa del Rey ===
16 December 2020 First round	Las Rozas	1–0	Mirandés	Las Rozas
19:00 CET (UTC+1)	Carrasco 10'	Report		Stadium: Navalcarbón; Referee: Juan Luis Pulido Santana
