= 2021–22 Rayo Vallecano season =

Rayo Vallecano
2021–22 season
- Owner: Raúl Martín Presa
- President: Raúl Martín Presa
- Head coach: Andoni Iraola
- Stadium: Campo de Fútbol de Vallecas
- La Liga: 12th
- Copa del Rey: Semi-finals
- Top goalscorer: League: Sergi Guardiola (8); All: Sergi Guardiola (10)
- Highest home attendance: 9,340 vs Barcelona (27 October 2021)
- Lowest home attendance: 583 vs Granada (29 August 2021)
- Biggest win: Rayo Vallecano 4–0 Granada
- Biggest defeat: Rayo Vallecano 1–5 Villarreal
Home colours	Away colours	Third colours

The 2021–22 season was the 98th season in the existence of Rayo Vallecano and the club's first season back in the top flight of Spanish football. In addition to the domestic league, Rayo Vallecano participated in this season's edition of the Copa del Rey.

== Players ==
=== First-team squad ===
As of 2 February 2022

Note: Flags indicate national team as defined under FIFA eligibility rules; some limited exceptions apply. Players may hold more than one non-FIFA nationality.

No.	Pos.	Nation	Player
1	GK	FRA	Luca Zidane
2	DF	SRB	Nikola Maraš (on loan from Almería)
3	FW	COL	Radamel Falcao
4	MF	ESP	Mario Suárez (3rd captain)
5	DF	ESP	Alejandro Catena
6	MF	ESP	Santi Comesaña (vice-captain)
7	FW	ESP	Isi Palazón
8	FW	ARG	Óscar Trejo (captain)
9	MF	FRA	Randy Nteka
10	FW	CPV	Bebé
11	FW	SEN	Mamadou Sylla (on loan from Alavés)
12	MF	ESP	Unai López

No.	Pos.	Nation	Player
13	GK	MKD	Stole Dimitrievski
16	FW	ESP	Sergi Guardiola (on loan from Valladolid)
17	MF	ESP	Martín Merquelanz (on loan from Real Sociedad)
18	MF	ESP	Álvaro García
19	DF	POR	Kévin Rodrigues (on loan from Real Sociedad)
20	DF	ALB	Iván Balliu
21	MF	SEN	Pathé Ciss
23	MF	ESP	Óscar Valentín
24	DF	MNE	Esteban Saveljich
32	DF	ESP	Mario Hernández
33	DF	ESP	Fran García

=== Reserve team ===
Note: Flags indicate national team as defined under FIFA eligibility rules; some limited exceptions apply. Players may hold more than one non-FIFA nationality.

No.	Pos.	Nation	Player
26	DF	ESP	Sergio Gimeno
27	DF	ESP	Iker Recio

No.	Pos.	Nation	Player
28	MF	ESP	Álvaro Aguirre
31	MF	ESP	Manu Navarro

=== Out on loan ===
Note: Flags indicate national team as defined under FIFA eligibility rules; some limited exceptions apply. Players may hold more than one non-FIFA nationality.

No.	Pos.	Nation	Player
—	GK	COL	Iván Arboleda (on loan to Newell's Old Boys until 30 June 2022)
—	GK	ESP	Miguel Morro (on loan to Fuenlabrada until 30 June 2022)
—	DF	ESP	Jorge Moreno (on loan to Cultural Leonesa until 30 June 2022)
—	DF	ESP	Martín Pascual (on loan to Villarreal B until 30 June 2022)
—	MF	ESP	Joni Montiel (on loan to Oviedo until 30 June 2022)

No.	Pos.	Nation	Player
—	MF	ESP	José Ángel Pozo (on loan to Al Ahli SC until 30 June 2022)
—	FW	GUI	Lass Bangoura (on loan to Lamia until 30 June 2022)
—	FW	ESP	Andrés Martín (on loan to Tenerife until 30 June 2022)
—	FW	ESP	Sergio Moreno (on loan to Amorebieta until 30 June 2022)

== Transfers ==
=== In ===
Date	Player	From	Type	Fee	Ref
30 June 2021	(Spain) Sergio Moreno	Mirandés	Loan return		
13 July 2021	(Spain) Fran García	Real Madrid Castilla	Transfer	Undisclosed	
14 July 2021	(Albania) Iván Balliu	Almería	Transfer	Free	
4 September 2021	(Colombia) Radamel Falcao	Galatasaray	Transfer	Free	

=== Out ===
Date	Player	To	Type	Fee	Ref
30 June 2021	(Spain) Antoñín	Granada	Loan return		
30 June 2021	(Spain) Fran García	Real Madrid Castilla	Loan return		
30 June 2021	(Spain) Iván Martos	Almería	Loan return		

== Pre-season and friendlies ==
Win Draw Loss Fixtures

18 July 2021 Friendly	Real Madrid	1–1	Rayo Vallecano	Madrid, Spain
20:00 CEST (UTC+2)	Isco (pen.)		Chust (o.g.)	Stadium: Alfredo Di Stéfano; Attendance: 0

24 July 2021 Friendly	Espanyol	0–2	Rayo Vallecano	Marbella, Spain
10:00 CEST (UTC+2)				Stadium: Marbella Football Center

31 July 2021 Friendly	Getafe	0–0	Rayo Vallecano	Marbella, Spain
10:00 CEST (UTC+2)				Stadium: Marbella Football Center

4 August 2021 Friendly	Valladolid	3–1	Rayo Vallecano	Valladolid, Spain
20:00 CEST (UTC+2)				Stadium: José Zorrilla

7 August 2021 Friendly	Leganés	1–1	Rayo Vallecano	Leganés, Spain
19:00 CEST (UTC+2)				Stadium: Butarque

== Competitions ==
=== Overall record ===
Competition	First match	Last match	Starting round	Final position	Record							
Competition	First match	Last match	Starting round	Final position	Pld	W	D	L	GF	GA	GD	Win %
La Liga	15 August 2021	20 May 2022	Matchday 1	12th	38	11	9	18	39	50	−11	28.95
Copa del Rey	2 December 2021	3 March 2022	First round	Semi-finals	7	4	2	1	10	6	+4	57.14
Total					45	15	11	19	49	56	−7	33.33

Last updated: 20 May 2022
Source: Soccerway

=== La Liga ===
==== League table ====
Pos	Team	Pld	W	D	L	GF	GA	GD	Pts
10	Osasuna	38	12	11	15	37	51	−14	47
11	Celta Vigo	38	12	10	16	43	43	0	46
12	Rayo Vallecano	38	11	9	18	39	50	−11	42 (Note: Head-to-head points: Rayo Vallecano 9, Elche 7, Espanyol 1.)
13	Elche	38	11	9	18	40	52	−12	42
14	Espanyol	38	10	12	16	40	53	−13	42

Source: LaLiga Santander
Rules for classification: 1) Points; 2) Head-to-head points; 3) Head-to-head goal difference; 4) Goal difference; 5) Goals scored; 6) Fair-play points (Note: Head-to-head record is used only after all the matches between the teams in question have been played)

==== Results summary ====
Overall								Home						Away					
Pld	W	D	L	GF	GA	GD	Pts	W	D	L	GF	GA	GD	W	D	L	GF	GA	GD
38	11	9	18	39	50	−11	42	8	5	6	26	22	+4	3	4	12	13	28	−15

Last updated: 20 May 2022.
Source: La Liga

==== Results by round ====
Round	1	2	3	4	5	6	7	8	9	10	11	12	13	14	15	16	17	18	19	20	21	22	23	24	25	26	27	28	29	30	31	32	33	34	35	36	37	38
Ground	A	A	H	A	H	A	H	A	H	A	H	H	A	H	A	H	A	H	A	H	A	H	A	H	A	H	A	H	H	A	H	A	A	H	A	H	A	H
Result	L	L	W	D	W	W	W	L	W	L	W	D	L	W	D	W	L	W	L	D	W	L	L	L	L	L	L	D	L	D	D	L	W	D	D	L	L	L
Position	20	20	10	12	10	6	5	6	6	7	5	6	6	6	6	6	6	4	6	7	8	8	9	11	11	12	13	13	13	13	13	14	11	11	12	12	12	12

Updated to match(es) played on 20 May 2022. Source: La Liga
A = Away; H = Home; W = Win; D = Draw; L = Loss

==== Matches ====
The league fixtures were announced on 30 June 2021.

15 August 2021 1	Sevilla	3–0	Rayo Vallecano	Seville
22:15 CEST (UTC+2)	En-Nesyri 19' (pen.); Idrissi (yellow card) 45+5'; Lamela 55', 79'	Report		Stadium: Ramón Sánchez Pizjuán; Attendance: 13,962; Referee: Isidro Díaz de Mera Escuderos

22 August 2021 2	Real Sociedad	1–0	Rayo Vallecano	San Sebastián
17:00 CEST (UTC+2)	Oyarzabal 68' (pen.); Isak (yellow card) 86'; Pacheco (yellow card) 90'; Le Normand (yellow card) 90+5'	Report	Trejo (yellow card) 26'; Comesaña (yellow card) 55'; Balliu (yellow card) 66'; F. García (yellow card) 90+1'	Stadium: Anoeta; Attendance: 7,652; Referee: Santiago Jaime Latre

29 August 2021 3	Rayo Vallecano	4–0	Granada	Madrid
19:30 CEST (UTC+2)	Á. García 3'; Trejo 23' (pen.); Ciss (yellow card) 38'; Nteka 43'; Comesaña 58'	Report	Suárez (yellow card) 27'; Puertas (yellow card) 33'; Milla (yellow card) 33'; Quini (yellow card) 90+2'	Stadium: Campo de Fútbol de Vallecas; Attendance: 583; Referee: Jesús Gil Manzano

11 September 2021 4	Levante	1–1	Rayo Vallecano	Valencia
18:30 CEST (UTC+2)	Martínez (yellow card) 16'; Roger 39' (pen.); Morales (yellow card) 45+1'; Malsa (yellow card) 66'	Report	Ciss (yellow card) 43'; Comesaña (yellow card) 45+4'; Á. García (yellow card) 54'; Balliu (yellow card) 82'; Guardiola 90+2'	Stadium: Ciutat de València; Attendance: 12,974; Referee: Javier Alberola Rojas

18 September 2021 5	Rayo Vallecano	3–0	Getafe	Madrid
14:00 CEST (UTC+2)	Bébé (yellow card) 7'; Trejo 9' (pen.); Saveljich (yellow card) 42'; Comesaña (yellow card) 45+3'; F. García (yellow card) 46'; Ciss 78', (yellow card) 90+4'; Falcao 81'; Balliu (yellow card) 85'	Report	Djené (yellow card) 8'; Chema (yellow card) 18'; Suárez (yellow card) 38'; Olivera (yellow card) 41'; Aleñá (yellow card) 66'; Ünal (yellow card) 83', (penalty missed) 86'; Macías (yellow card) 90+5'	Stadium: Campo de Fútbol de Vallecas; Attendance: 3,280; Referee: Adrián Cordero Vega

21 September 2021 6	Athletic Bilbao	1–2	Rayo Vallecano	Bilbao
22:00 CEST (UTC+2)	Núñez (yellow card) 16'; Ciss 33' (o.g.); Muniain (yellow card) 56'; Martínez (yellow card) 90+4'	Report	Á. García 5'; Catena (yellow card) 7'; Guardiola (yellow card) 42'; Maraš (yellow card) 83'; Falcao 90+6'	Stadium: San Mamés; Attendance: 16,236; Referee: José Luis Munuera Montero

26 September 2021 7	Rayo Vallecano	3–1	Cádiz	Madrid
18:30 CEST (UTC+2)	Á. García 9'; Falcao 44'; Palazón (yellow card) 50', (goal) 87'; Balliu (yellow card) 59'	Report	Haroyan 23', (yellow card) 48'; Bastida (yellow card) 45+1'; Cala (yellow card) 56'; Perea (yellow card) 90+3'	Stadium: Campo de Fútbol de Vallecas; Attendance: 5,903; Referee: Ricardo de Burgos Bengoetxea

2 October 2021 8	Osasuna	1–0	Rayo Vallecano	Pamplona
14:00 CEST (UTC+2)	Torró (yellow card) 45'; Martínez (yellow card) 76'; Sánchez 90+1'; Ávila (yellow card) 90+5'	Report	Balliu (yellow card) 5'; Trejo (yellow card) 32'; Falcao (yellow card) 41'	Stadium: El Sadar; Attendance: 19,238; Referee: Mario Melero López

17 October 2021 9	Rayo Vallecano	2–1	Elche	Madrid
14:00 CEST (UTC+2)	Hernández 26'; Nteka 65'; López (yellow card) 81'; Á. García (yellow card) 90+1'	Report	Boyé 14'; Gumbau (yellow card) 28'; Casilla (yellow card) 90+4'	Stadium: Campo de Fútbol de Vallecas; Attendance: 6,989; Referee: Santiago Jaime Latre

24 October 2021 10	Real Betis	3–2	Rayo Vallecano	Seville
18:30 CEST (UTC+2)	Moreno 22'; Juanmi 24'; González (yellow card) 32'; Willian José 75' (pen.)	Report	Á. García (yellow card) 32', (goal) 65'; Nteka 45+1'; Trejo (yellow card) 61'	Stadium: Benito Villamarín; Attendance: 45,362; Referee: Ricardo de Burgos Bengoetxea

27 October 2021 11	Rayo Vallecano	1–0	Barcelona	Madrid
19:00 CEST (UTC+2)	Trejo (yellow card) 24'; Falcao 30'; Saveljich (yellow card) 83'	Report	Coutinho (yellow card) 53'; Piqué (yellow card) 66'; Depay (penalty missed) 72'	Stadium: Campo de Fútbol de Vallecas; Attendance: 9,340; Referee: Antonio Mateu Lahoz

1 November 2021 12	Rayo Vallecano	0–0	Celta Vigo	Madrid
18:30 CET (UTC+1)	Valentín (yellow card) 65'; Palazón (yellow card) 69'	Report	Galán (yellow card) 45'; Solari (yellow card) 51'; Méndez (yellow card) 69'; Fontán (yellow card) 70'; Tapia (yellow card) 81'	Stadium: Campo de Fútbol de Vallecas; Attendance: 9,580; Referee: Guillermo Cuadra Fernández

6 November 2021 13	Real Madrid	2–1	Rayo Vallecano	Madrid
21:00 CET (UTC+1)	Kroos 14', (yellow card) 29'; Benzema 38'	Report	Balliu (yellow card) 45+2'; Comesaña (yellow card) 69'; Falcao 77'	Stadium: Santiago Bernabéu; Attendance: 43,283; Referee: Pablo González Fuertes

22 November 2021 14	Rayo Vallecano	3–1	Mallorca	Madrid
21:00 CET (UTC+1)	Guardiola 16', (yellow card) 57'; Á. García 20'; Valentín (yellow card) 48'; Trejo 63' (pen.), (yellow card) 65'	Report	Lee (yellow card) 28'; Oliván (yellow card) 57'; Abdón 89'	Stadium: Campo de Fútbol de Vallecas; Attendance: 6,708; Referee: Jorge Figueroa Vázquez

27 November 2021 15	Valencia	1–1	Rayo Vallecano	Valencia
16:15 CET (UTC+1)	Soler 19' (pen.), (yellow card) 27'; Diakhaby (yellow card) 45'; Alderete (yellow card) 45+2'; Gayà (yellow card) 55'; Foulquier (yellow card) 62'; Wass (yellow card) 68'	Report	Saveljich (yellow card) 18'; Comesaña (yellow card) 54'; Palazón (yellow card) 55', (goal) 64'; Catena (yellow card) 73'; Valentín (yellow card) 75'	Stadium: Mestalla; Attendance: 30,030; Referee: Alejandro Hernández Hernández

5 December 2021 16	Rayo Vallecano	1–0	Espanyol	Madrid
14:00 CET (UTC+1)	Trejo (yellow card) 40'; Cabrera 54' (o.g.); Nteka (yellow card) 90'; Valentín (yellow card) 90+3'	Report	Puado (yellow card) 9'; Vidal (yellow card) 70'; Cabrera (yellow card) 90+1'; Mérida (red card) 90+3'	Stadium: Campo de Fútbol de Vallecas; Attendance: 11,879; Referee: José Luis Munuera Montero

12 December 2021 17	Villarreal	2–0	Rayo Vallecano	Villarreal
14:00 CET (UTC+1)	Torres (yellow card) 23'; Mandi 32'; Gerard 36' (pen.)	Report	Catena (yellow card) 37'; Palazón (yellow card) 38'; F. García (yellow card) 61'	Stadium: Estadio de la Cerámica; Attendance: 13,133; Referee: Mario Melero López

18 December 2021 18	Rayo Vallecano	2–0	Alavés	Madrid
14:00 CET (UTC+1)	Trejo (yellow card) 10'; Guardiola 19'; Catena 26'	Report	Duarte (yellow card) 24'; Tachi (yellow card) 70'	Stadium: Campo de Fútbol de Vallecas; Attendance: 7,911; Referee: Juan Martínez Munuera

2 January 2022 19	Atlético Madrid	2–0	Rayo Vallecano	Madrid
16:15 CET (UTC+1)	Suárez (yellow card) 26'; Correa 28', 53'; Giménez (yellow card) 63'; De Paul (yellow card) 73'	Report		Stadium: Wanda Metropolitano; Attendance: 43,029; Referee: Jorge Figueroa Vázquez

9 January 2022 20	Rayo Vallecano	1–1	Real Betis	Madrid
14:00 CET (UTC+1)	Valentín (yellow card) 55'; Balliu 70'	Report	Moreno (red card) 33'; Canales (yellow card) 34', (goal) 45+2'; Guardado (yellow card) 45+6'; Rui Silva (yellow card) 87'	Stadium: Campo de Fútbol de Vallecas; Attendance: 8,395; Referee: Alejandro Muñiz Ruiz

23 January 2022 22	Rayo Vallecano	0–1	Athletic Bilbao	Madrid
18:30 CET (UTC+1)	López (yellow card) 89'	Report	I. Williams (yellow card) 17'; Serrano 30'; Zarraga (yellow card) 60'; D. García (yellow card) 69'; Simón (yellow card) 82'; Lekue (yellow card) 86'; N. Williams (yellow card) 88'	Stadium: Campo de Fútbol de Vallecas; Attendance: 9,034; Referee: Adrián Cordero Vega

5 February 2022 23	Celta Vigo	2–0	Rayo Vallecano	Vigo
18:30 CET (UTC+1)	Méndez 12', 80'	Report	Trejo (yellow card) 34'; Ciss (yellow card) 38'	Stadium: Balaídos; Attendance: 12,546; Referee: José Luis Munuera Montero

12 February 2022 24	Rayo Vallecano	0–3	Osasuna	Madrid
18:30 CET (UTC+1)	Á. García (yellow card) 24'; Saveljich (yellow card) 34'	Report	Moncayola 8'; R. García 40'; Vidal (yellow card) 70'; K. García 90+3'	Stadium: Campo de Fútbol de Vallecas; Attendance: 8,596; Referee: Jorge Figueroa Vázquez

18 February 2022 25	Elche	2–1	Rayo Vallecano	Elche
21:00 CET (UTC+1)	Guti (yellow card) 32'; Carrillo 76'; Ponce 84'; Mojica (yellow card) 90+6'	Report	Comesaña (yellow card) 7'; F. García 52'; Catena (yellow card) 68'; Sylla (yellow card) 72'; Balliu (yellow card) 75'	Stadium: Estadio Manuel Martínez Valero; Attendance: 14,742; Referee: Alejandro Muñiz Ruiz

26 February 2022 26	Rayo Vallecano	0–1	Real Madrid	Madrid
18:30 CET (UTC+1)	Valentín (yellow card) 42'; Trejo (yellow card) 56'; Balliu (yellow card) 65'; Bebé (yellow card) 72'; Catena (yellow card) 79'	Report	Casemiro (yellow card) 58'; Mendy (yellow card) 63'; Benzema 83'; Ceballos (yellow card) 90+6'	Stadium: Campo de Fútbol de Vallecas; Attendance: 9,952; Referee: Isidro Díaz de Mera Escuderos

6 March 2022 27	Cádiz	2–0	Rayo Vallecano	Cádiz
14:00 CET (UTC+1)	Akapo (yellow card) 10'; Alcaraz (yellow card) 37', (goal) 55'; Idrissi (yellow card) 45+1', (goal) 63'; Alejo (yellow card) 65'; Sobrino (yellow card) 82'	Report	Palazón (yellow card) 12'; Á. García (yellow card) 45+2'; Maraš (yellow card) 62'	Stadium: Nuevo Mirandilla; Attendance: 15,677; Referee: César Soto Grado

13 March 2022 28	Rayo Vallecano	1–1	Sevilla	Madrid
14:00 CET (UTC+1)	Bebé 46'	Report	Ocampos (yellow card) 59'; Delaney 63'	Stadium: Campo de Fútbol de Vallecas; Attendance: 9,073; Referee: Juan Martínez Munuera

19 March 2022 29	Rayo Vallecano	0–1	Atlético Madrid	Madrid
21:00 CET (UTC+1)	Suárez (yellow card) 30'; Comesaña (yellow card) 42'; Trejo (yellow card) 65'	Report	Lodi (yellow card) 20'; Koke 49', (yellow card) 78'; Kondogbia (yellow card) 74'; Oblak (yellow card) 82'; Correa (red card) 85'; Savić (yellow card) 85'	Stadium: Campo de Fútbol de Vallecas; Attendance: 10,349; Referee: José Luis Munuera Montero

3 April 2022 30	Granada	2–2	Rayo Vallecano	Granada
18:30 CEST (UTC+2)	Petrović (yellow card) 8'; Milla (yellow card) 23', (goal) 90+3' (pen.); Collado (yellow card) 45+3'; Molina 67'; Arezo (yellow card) 88'	Report	Catena 6', (yellow card) 90+3'; Guardiola 17', (yellow card) 57'; Comesaña (yellow card) 49' (yellow-red card) 51'; Hernández (yellow card) 90+5'	Stadium: Nuevo Los Cármenes; Attendance: 15,823; Referee: Alejandro Hernández Hernández

11 April 2022 31	Rayo Vallecano	1–1	Valencia	Madrid
21:00 CEST (UTC+2)	López (yellow card) 5'; Guardiola 83'; Balliu (yellow card) 90+3'; Catena (yellow card) 90+9'	Report	Moriba (yellow card) 8'; Duro (yellow card) 42'; Soler 57'; Marcos André (yellow card) 74'; Correia (yellow card) 90+9'	Stadium: Campo de Fútbol de Vallecas; Attendance: 9,302; Referee: Ricardo de Burgos Bengoetxea

16 April 2022 32	Alavés	1–0	Rayo Vallecano	Vitoria-Gasteiz
16:15 CEST (UTC+2)	Escalante (yellow card) 45+3'; Joselu 64'; Duarte (yellow card) 90+9'	Report	Nteka (yellow card) 55'; Balliu (red card) 88'; Maraš (yellow card) 90+3'; Palazón (yellow card) 90+8'	Stadium: Mendizorrotza; Attendance: 10,165; Referee: Juan Martínez Munuera

21 April 2022 33	Espanyol	0–1	Rayo Vallecano	Cornellà de Llobregat
19:00 CEST (UTC+2)	Embarba (yellow card) 50'; Vidal (yellow card) 86'; Cabrera (yellow card) 90+2'; Calero (yellow card) 90+4'	Report	Trejo (yellow card) 40'; Guardiola 42'; Hernández (yellow card) 46'; Comesaña (yellow card) 57'; García (yellow card) 76'	Stadium: RCDE Stadium; Attendance: 11,873; Referee: Antonio Mateu Lahoz

24 April 2022 21	Barcelona	0–1	Rayo Vallecano	Barcelona
21:00 CEST (UTC+2)	L. de Jong (yellow card) 81'; Dembélé (yellow card) 89'; Alba (yellow card) 90+3'; Gavi (yellow card) 90+13'	Report	Á. García 7'; Comesaña (yellow card) 37'; Balliu (yellow card) 69'; Palazón (yellow card) 86'; Hernández (yellow card) 90+5'; Trejo (yellow card) 90+6'; Catena (yellow card) 90+12'	Stadium: Camp Nou; Attendance: 57,023; Referee: Isidro Díaz de Mera Escuderos

1 May 2022 34	Rayo Vallecano	1–1	Real Sociedad	Madrid
18:30 CEST (UTC+2)	López (yellow card) 56'; Valentín (yellow card) 73'; Falcao 77'	Report	Sørloth 33'; Zubeldia (yellow card) 38'	Stadium: Campo de Fútbol de Vallecas; Attendance: 9,395; Referee: Alejandro Muñiz Ruiz

8 May 2022 35	Getafe	0–0	Rayo Vallecano	Getafe
14:00 CEST (UTC+2)	Olivera (yellow card) 37'; Arambarri (yellow card) 49'	Report	Trejo (yellow card) 27'; Valentín (yellow card) 39'; Suárez (yellow card) 42'; Ciss (yellow card) 66'	Stadium: Coliseum Alfonso Pérez; Attendance: 10,125; Referee: Mario Melero López

12 May 2022 36	Rayo Vallecano	1–5	Villarreal	Madrid
20:00 CEST (UTC+2)	Guardiola 21'; Maraš (yellow card) 30'; Á. García (yellow card) 45+2'; Comesaña (yellow card) 45+2'; López (yellow card) 76'; Sylla (yellow card) 77'	Report	Pedraza 3', 88'; Foyth 27'; Alcácer 38'; Torres 45+1'; Rulli (yellow card) 61'; Albiol (yellow card) 82'	Stadium: Campo de Fútbol de Vallecas; Attendance: 7,945; Referee: Isidro Díaz de Mera Escuderos

15 May 2022 37	Mallorca	2–1	Rayo Vallecano	Palma
18:30 CEST (UTC+2)	Muriqi 13', (yellow card) 45'; Abdón 90+2'	Report	Ciss 60'	Stadium: Visit Mallorca Stadium; Attendance: 17,930; Referee: José Luis Munuera Montero

20 May 2022 38	Rayo Vallecano	2–4	Levante	Madrid
21:00 CEST (UTC+2)	Á. García 18'; Guardiola 61' (pen.)	Report	Melero 26', 45+1'; Roger 44'; Saracchi (yellow card) 55'; Postigo (yellow card) 75'; Coke 76'; Vezo (yellow card) 86'	Stadium: Campo de Fútbol de Vallecas; Attendance: 8,446; Referee: Mario Melero López

=== Copa del Rey ===
2 December 2021 First round	Guijuelo	1–1 (a.e.t.) (3–4 p)	Rayo Vallecano	Guijuelo
19:00 CET (UTC+1)	Toti 19'; Piojo (yellow card) 30'; Cristóbal (yellow card) 104'; Rodríguez (yellow card) 118'; Trapero (yellow card) 120'	Report	Pozo 5'; Rodrigues (yellow card) 77' (yellow-red card) 79'; Maraš (yellow card) 89'; Valentín (yellow card) 112'; Comesaña (yellow card) 117'	Stadium: Estadio Municipal de Guijuelo; Referee: Alejandro Muñiz Ruiz
	Penalties
	Rodríguez (penalty missed); Caramelo (penalty scored); Rubén (penalty scored); Toti (penalty scored); Cristóbal (penalty missed)		(penalty missed) Suárez; (penalty scored) Palazón; (penalty scored) Trejo; (penalty scored) Comesaña; (penalty scored) Guardiola

15 December 2021 Second round	Bergantiños	1–3	Rayo Vallecano	Carballo
19:00 CET (UTC+1)	Concheiro (yellow card) 69'; Cano 77'	Report	Suárez 37'; Ciss 67'; Moreno 90+1'	Stadium: Estadio As Eiroas; Referee: Pablo González Fuertes

5 January 2022 Round of 32	Mirandés	0–1	Rayo Vallecano	Miranda de Ebro
20:00 CET (UTC+1)	Olguín (yellow card) 82'; Arroyo (yellow card) 88'; López (red card) 90+7'	Report	Martín 67', (yellow card) 75'	Stadium: Anduva; Referee: José Luis Munuera Montero

15 January 2022 Round of 16	Girona	1–2	Rayo Vallecano	Girona
18:30 CET (UTC+1)	Juanpe (yellow card) 18'; Espinosa 26'; Stuani (penalty missed) 71'; A. Martínez (yellow card) 79'; Moreno (yellow card) 90+7'; G. Martínez (red card) 90+8'	Report	Suárez (yellow card) 26'; Catena (yellow card) 26'; Guardiola 45+1', 48'; Valentín (yellow card) 69'; Palazón (yellow card) 90+4'; Comesaña (yellow card) 90+6'; Trejo (yellow card) 90+7'	Stadium: Montilivi; Referee: Adrián Cordero Vega

2 February 2022 Quarter-finals	Rayo Vallecano	1–0	Mallorca	Madrid
20:00 CET (UTC+1)	Comesaña (yellow card) 28'; Trejo 44' (pen.), (yellow card) 78'; Valentín (yellow card) 72'; Ciss (yellow card) 90+7'; Dimitrievski (yellow card) 90+8'; Balliu (yellow card) 90+9'	Report	Ruiz de Galarreta (yellow card) 33'; Sánchez (yellow card) 51'; Russo (yellow card) 84'; Maffeo (yellow card) 90+1'; Valjent (yellow card) 90+1'	Stadium: Campo de Fútbol de Vallecas; Referee: César Soto Grado

9 February 2022 Semi-finals; First leg	Rayo Vallecano	1–2	Real Betis	Madrid
21:00 CET (UTC+1)	Á. García 5'; Valentín (yellow card) 65'	Report	Iglesias 26'; Carvalho 68'; Silva (yellow card) 78'	Stadium: Campo de Fútbol de Vallecas; Referee: José María Sánchez Martínez

3 March 2022 Semi-finals; Second leg	Real Betis	1–1 (3–2 agg.)	Rayo Vallecano	Seville
21:00 CET (UTC+1)	Willian José (yellow card) 79'; Iglesias 90+2'	Report	Balliu (yellow card) 71'; Bebé 80'	Stadium: Benito Villamarín; Referee: Juan Martínez Munuera

== Statistics ==
=== Appearances and goals ===
No.	Pos	Nat	Player	Total		La Liga		Copa del Rey	
No.	Pos	Nat	Player	Apps	Goals	Apps	Goals	Apps	Goals
Goalkeepers
1	GK	(France) FRA	Luca Zidane	13	0	8	0	5	0
13	GK	(North Macedonia) MKD	Stole Dimitrievski	33	0	30+1	0	2	0
25	GK	(Colombia) COL	Iván Arboleda	0	0	0	0	0	0
Defenders
2	DF	(Serbia) SRB	Nikola Maraš	19	0	11+5	0	3	0
5	DF	(Spain) ESP	Alejandro Catena	40	2	36	2	4	0
19	DF	(Portugal) POR	Kévin Rodrigues	17	0	5+8	0	3+1	0
20	DF	(Albania) ALB	Iván Balliu	40	1	35	1	4+1	0
24	DF	(Montenegro) MNE	Esteban Saveljich	23	0	21	0	0+2	0
32	DF	(Spain) ESP	Mario Hernández	12	1	5+4	1	3	0
33	DF	(Spain) ESP	Fran García	39	1	34	1	4+1	0
Midfielders
4	MF	(Spain) ESP	Mario Suárez	21	1	8+6	0	7	1
6	MF	(Spain) ESP	Santi Comesaña	41	1	32+3	1	4+2	0
9	MF	(France) FRA	Randy Nteka	39	3	16+18	3	2+3	0
10	MF	(Cape Verde) CPV	Bebé	36	2	6+23	1	4+3	1
12	MF	(Spain) ESP	Unai López	30	0	13+14	0	2+1	0
17	MF	(Spain) ESP	Martín Merquelanz	4	0	3+1	0	0	0
18	MF	(Spain) ESP	Álvaro García	39	8	34+2	7	3	1
21	MF	(Senegal) SEN	Pathé Ciss	36	3	11+20	2	3+2	1
22	MF	(Spain) ESP	José Ángel Pozo	7	1	0+5	0	2	1
23	MF	(Spain) ESP	Óscar Valentín	39	0	26+6	0	5+2	0
Forwards
3	FW	(Colombia) COL	Radamel Falcao	25	6	8+14	6	1+2	0
7	FW	(Spain) ESP	Isi Palazón	40	2	27+7	2	4+2	0
8	FW	(Argentina) ARG	Óscar Trejo	38	4	24+8	3	3+3	1
11	FW	(Spain) ESP	Andrés Martín	11	1	1+6	0	3+1	1
14	FW	(Morocco) MAR	Yacine Qasmi	2	0	0+1	0	1	0
16	FW	(Spain) ESP	Sergi Guardiola	38	10	20+12	8	4+2	2
29	FW	(Spain) ESP	Sergio Moreno	2	1	0	0	0+2	1
11	FW	(Senegal) SEN	Mamadou Sylla	14	0	1+11	0	0+2	0
34	FW	(Spain) ESP	Vere	2	0	0+2	0	0	0
Players who have made an appearance this season but have left the club

=== Top Goalscorers ===
Rank	Player	La Liga	Copa del Rey	Total
1	(Spain) Sergi Guardiola	8	2	10
2	(Spain) Álvaro García	7	1	8
3	(Colombia) Radamel Falcao	6	0	6
4	(Argentina) Óscar Trejo	3	1	4
5	(France) Randy Nteka	3	0	3
5	(Senegal) Pathé Ciss	2	1	3
Total		29	5	34
