= 2019–20 CD Mirandés season =

CD Mirandés
2019–20 season
- President: Alfredo de Miguel Crespo
- Manager: Andoni Iraola
- Stadium: Estadio Municipal de Anduva
- Segunda División: 11th
- Copa del Rey: Semi-finals
- Top goalscorer: League: Martín Merquelanz (14 goals); All: Martín Merquelanz (16 goals)
| Home colours | Away colours |

The 2019–20 CD Mirandés season was the club's 93rd season in existence and its first season back in the second division of Spanish football. In addition to the domestic league, CD Mirandés participated in this season's edition of the Copa del Rey. The season was due to cover a period from 1 July 2019 to 30 June 2020. It was extended extraordinarily beyond 30 June due to the COVID-19 pandemic in Spain.

== Players ==
=== Current squad ===
As of 7 February 2020

Note: Flags indicate national team as defined under FIFA eligibility rules; some limited exceptions apply. Players may hold more than one non-FIFA nationality.

| No. | Pos. | Nation | Player |
|---|---|---|---|
| 1 | GK | ESP | Limones |
| 2 | DF | DOM | Carlos Julio |
| 3 | DF | ESP | Gorka Kijera (captain) |
| 4 | DF | ESP | Sergio González |
| 5 | DF | ESP | Odei Onaindia |
| 6 | DF | FRA | Modibo Sagnan (on loan from Real Sociedad) |
| 7 | MF | ESP | Álvaro Peña (on loan from Albacete) |
| 8 | MF | ITA | Lorenzo Crisetig |
| 9 | FW | BRA | Matheus Aiás (on loan from Watford) |
| 10 | MF | ESP | Álvaro Rey |
| 11 | MF | ESP | Martín Merquelanz (on loan from Real Sociedad) |
| 14 | MF | ESP | Joaquín Muñoz (on loan from Huesca) |

| No. | Pos. | Nation | Player |
|---|---|---|---|
| 15 | MF | MTQ | Mickaël Malsa |
| 17 | FW | ESP | Iñigo Vicente (on loan from Athletic Bilbao) |
| 18 | FW | ESP | Mario Barco |
| 19 | MF | GHA | Ernest Ohemeng |
| 20 | DF | VEN | Alexander González |
| 22 | FW | BRA | Marcos André (on loan from Valladolid) |
| 23 | MF | ESP | Jon Guridi (on loan from Real Sociedad) |
| 25 | GK | ESP | Raúl Lizoain |
| 26 | DF | ESP | Enric Franquesa (on loan from Villarreal) |
| 28 | MF | ESP | Antonio Sánchez (on loan from Mallorca) |
| 31 | GK | ESP | Alberto González |

=== Out on loan ===
Note: Flags indicate national team as defined under FIFA eligibility rules; some limited exceptions apply. Players may hold more than one non-FIFA nationality.

| No. | Pos. | Nation | Player |
|---|---|---|---|
| — | MF | ESP | Andrés García (at FC Andorra until 30 June 2020) |

== Pre-season and friendlies ==
Win Draw Loss

== Competitions ==
=== Overview ===
| Competition | First match | Last match | Starting round | Final position | Record | | | | | | | |
| Competition | First match | Last match | Starting round | Final position | Pld | W | D | L | GF | GA | GD | Win % |
|---|---|---|---|---|---|---|---|---|---|---|---|---|
| Segunda División | 17 August 2019 | 20 July 2020 | Matchday 1 | 11th | 42 | 13 | 17 | 12 | 55 | 59 | −4 | 30.95 |
| Copa del Rey | 17 December 2019 | 4 March 2020 | First round | Semi-finals | 7 | 5 | 0 | 2 | 18 | 13 | +5 | 71.43 |
| Total | | | | | 49 | 18 | 17 | 14 | 73 | 72 | +1 | 36.73 |

Last updated: 20 July 2020
Source: Competitions

=== Segunda División ===
==== League table ====
| Pos | Team | Pld | W | D | L | GF | GA | GD | Pts |
|---|---|---|---|---|---|---|---|---|---|
| 9 | Las Palmas | 42 | 14 | 15 | 13 | 49 | 46 | +3 | 57 |
| 10 | Alcorcón | 42 | 13 | 18 | 11 | 52 | 50 | +2 | 57 |
| 11 | Mirandés | 42 | 13 | 17 | 12 | 55 | 59 | −4 | 56 |
| 12 | Tenerife | 42 | 14 | 13 | 15 | 50 | 46 | +4 | 55 |
| 13 | Sporting Gijón | 42 | 14 | 12 | 16 | 40 | 38 | +2 | 54 |

Source: LaLiga Soccerway
Rules for classification: 1) points; 2) head-to-head points; 3) head-to-head goal difference; 4) goal difference; 5) number of goals scored

==== Results summary ====
| Overall | | | | | | | | Home | | | | | | Away | | | | | |
| Pld | W | D | L | GF | GA | GD | Pts | W | D | L | GF | GA | GD | W | D | L | GF | GA | GD |
|---|---|---|---|---|---|---|---|---|---|---|---|---|---|---|---|---|---|---|---|
| 42 | 13 | 17 | 12 | 55 | 59 | −4 | 56 | 8 | 11 | 2 | 25 | 17 | +8 | 5 | 6 | 10 | 30 | 42 | −12 |

Last updated: 20 July 2020.
Source: La Liga SmartBank

==== Results by round ====
| Round | 1 | 2 | 3 | 4 | 5 | 6 | 7 | 8 | 9 | 10 | 11 | 12 | 13 | 14 | 15 | 16 | 17 | 18 | 19 | 20 | 21 | 22 | 23 | 24 | 25 | 26 | 27 | 28 | 29 | 30 | 31 | 32 | 33 | 34 | 35 | 36 | 37 | 38 | 39 | 40 | 41 | 42 |
|---|---|---|---|---|---|---|---|---|---|---|---|---|---|---|---|---|---|---|---|---|---|---|---|---|---|---|---|---|---|---|---|---|---|---|---|---|---|---|---|---|---|---|
| Ground | A | H | A | H | A | H | A | H | A | H | H | A | H | A | H | A | H | A | H | A | H | A | H | A | H | A | A | H | A | H | H | A | H | A | H | A | H | A | H | A | H | A |
| Result | D | L | L | W | D | L | D | D | D | L | W | W | D | L | W | W | W | D | L | W | W | D | D | D | D | D | D | D | L | D | W | W | W | L | L | D | L | D | W | L | W | L |
| Position | 9 | 15 | 22 | 14 | 17 | 20 | 20 | 20 | 20 | 21 | 17 | 15 | 15 | 16 | 15 | 13 | 11 | 12 | 12 | 10 | 10 | 9 | 10 | 10 | 11 | 10 | 10 | 10 | 12 | 11 | 8 | 7 | 6 | 8 | 10 | 10 | 11 | 11 | 10 | 13 | 9 | 11 |

Updated to match(es) played on 20 July 2020. Source: La Liga SmartBank
A = Away; H = Home; W = Win; D = Draw; L = Loss

==== Matches ====
The fixtures were revealed on 4 July 2019.

| 17 August 2019 1 | Rayo Vallecano | 2–2 | Mirandés | Madrid |
| 21:00 CEST (UTC+2) | | | | Stadium: Vallecas |

| 24 August 2019 2 | Mirandés | 1–2 | Cádiz | Miranda de Ebro |
| 19:00 CEST (UTC+2) | Merquelanz 86' | Report | Perea 61'; Álex 90' (pen.) | Stadium: Anduva; Attendance: 2,943; Referee: Iosu Galech Apezteguía |

| 31 August 2019 3 | Numancia | 2–0 | Mirandés | Soria |
| 18:00 CEST (UTC+2) | | | | Stadium: Los Pajaritos |

| 8 September 2019 4 | Mirandés | 2–1 | Real Oviedo | Miranda de Ebro |
| 18:00 CEST (UTC+2) | | | | Stadium: Anduva |

| 14 September 2019 5 | Mirandés | 1–1 | Málaga | Miranda de Ebro |
| 16:00 CEST (UTC+2) | | | | Stadium: Anduva |

| 17 September 2019 6 | Racing Santander | 4–0 | Mirandés | Santander |
| 19:00 CEST (UTC+2) | Marong 23', 26'; Rodríguez 59'; Yoda 71'; Barral (yellow card) 74' | Report | González (yellow card) 28'; David González (yellow card) 53' (yellow-red card) 88'; Malsa (yellow card) 75' | Stadium: El Sardinero; Attendance: 12,305; Referee: Iñaki Vicandi Garrido |

| 20 September 2019 7 | Mirandés | 2–2 | Alcorcón | Miranda de Ebro |
| 21:00 CEST (UTC+2) | | | | Stadium: Anduva |

| 29 September 2019 8 | Deportivo La Coruña | 1–1 | Mirandés | A Coruña |
| 21:00 CEST (UTC+2) | | | | Stadium: Abanca-Riazor |

| 2 October 2019 9 | Mirandés | 1–1 | Lugo | Miranda de Ebro |
| 19:00 CEST (UTC+2) | | | | Stadium: Anduva |

| 5 October 2019 10 | Ponferradina | 2–0 | Mirandés | Ponferrada |
| 20:00 CEST (UTC+2) | | | | Stadium: El Toralín |

| 13 October 2019 11 | Mirandés | 2–1 | Fuenlabrada | Miranda de Ebro |
| 12:00 CEST (UTC+2) | | | | Stadium: Anduva |

| 20 October 2019 12 | Real Zaragoza | 1–2 | Mirandés | Zaragoza |
| 21:00 CEST (UTC+2) | Suárez (yellow card) 46'; Soro 74'; Linares (yellow card) 79' | Report | Marcos André 22', (yellow card) 43'; Peña 61' | Stadium: La Romareda; Attendance: 18,897; Referee: Daniel Jesús Trujillo Suárez |

| 26 October 2019 13 | Mirandés | 0–0 | Tenerife | Miranda de Ebro |
| 18:00 CEST (UTC+2) | | | | Stadium: Anduva |

| 3 November 2019 14 | Elche | 4–2 | Mirandés | Elche |
| 20:00 CET (UTC+1) | | | | Stadium: Martínez Valero |

| 9 November 2019 15 | Mirandés | 2–0 | Extremadura | Miranda de Ebro |
| 16:00 CET (UTC+1) | | | | Stadium: Anduva |

| 17 November 2019 16 | Mirandés | 2–1 | Las Palmas | Miranda de Ebro |
| 18:30 CET (UTC+1) | | | | Stadium: Anduva |

| 24 November 2019 17 | Albacete | 1–2 | Mirandés | Albacete |
| 16:00 CET (UTC+1) | | | | Stadium: Carlos Belmonte |

| 30 November 2019 18 | Mirandés | 0–0 | Sporting Gijón | Miranda de Ebro |
| 16:00 CET (UTC+1) | | | | Stadium: Anduva |

| 7 December 2019 19 | Almería | 3–1 | Mirandés | Almería |
| 20:00 CET (UTC+1) | | | | Stadium: Juegos Mediterráneos |

| 14 December 2019 20 | Mirandés | 2–0 | Huesca | Miranda de Ebro |
| 16:00 CET (UTC+1) | | | | Stadium: Anduva |

| 22 December 2019 21 | Girona | 0–3 | Mirandés | Girona |
| 20:00 CET (UTC+1) | | | | Stadium: Montilivi |

| 4 January 2020 22 | Mirandés | 0–0 | Racing Santander | Miranda de Ebro |
| 20:00 CET (UTC+1) | | Report | | Stadium: Anduva; Attendance: 4,058; Referee: Dámaso Arcediano Monescillo |

| 15 January 2020 23 | Cádiz | 3–3 | Mirandés | Cádiz |
| 21:00 CET (UTC+1) | Lozano 40'; Rhyner 47'; Nano 90' | Report | Merquelanz 42'; Guridi 90+5'; Odei 90+7' | Stadium: Ramón de Carranza; Attendance: 14,984; Referee: Alejandro Muñiz Ruiz |

| 26 January 2020 25 | Málaga | 2–2 | Mirandés | Málaga |
| 12:00 CET (UTC+1) | | | | Stadium: La Rosaleda |

| 2 February 2020 26 | Mirandés | 0–0 | Rayo Vallecano | Miranda de Ebro |
| 18:15 CET (UTC+1) | | | | Stadium: Anduva |

| 9 February 2020 27 | Sporting Gijón | 2–2 | Mirandés | Gijón |
| 16:00 CET (UTC+1) | | | | Stadium: El Molinón |

| 16 February 2020 28 | Mirandés | 1–1 | Albacete | Miranda de Ebro |
| 12:00 CET (UTC+1) | | | | Stadium: Anduva |

| 19 February 2020 24 | Mirandés | 1–1 | Real Zaragoza | Miranda de Ebro |
| 21:00 CET (UTC+1) | González (yellow card) 43'; Matheus 48'; Kijera (yellow card) 55'; Sánchez (yellow card) 75'; Peña (yellow card) 77'; Malsa (yellow card) 79' | Report | Puado (yellow card) 27'; Igbekeme 36'; Vigaray (yellow card) 42'; Nieto (yellow card) 81' | Stadium: Anduva; Attendance: 3,434; Referee: Gorka Sagués Oscoz |

| 23 February 2020 29 | Extremadura | 3–2 | Mirandés | Almendralejo |
| 18:15 CET (UTC+1) | | | | Stadium: Ciudad de Almendralejo |

| 1 March 2020 30 | Mirandés | 1–1 | Girona | Miranda de Ebro |
| 12:00 CET (UTC+1) | | | | Stadium: Anduva |

| 8 March 2020 31 | Alcorcón | 1–2 | Mirandés | Alcorcón |
| 18:15 CET (UTC+1) | | | | Stadium: Santo Domingo |

| 14 June 2020 32 | Mirandés | 2–1 | Numancia | Miranda de Ebro |
| 12:00 CEST (UTC+2) | | Report | | Stadium: Anduva; Attendance: 0 Referee: Aitor Gorostegui Fernández-Ortega |

| 18 June 2020 33 | Huesca | 1–2 | Mirandés | Huesca |
| 19:30 CEST (UTC+2) | | Report | | Stadium: El Alcoraz; Attendance: 0 Referee: Iosu Galech Apezteguía |

| 21 June 2020 34 | Mirandés | 1–2 | Ponferradina | Miranda de Ebro |
| 17:00 CEST (UTC+2) | | Report | | Stadium: Anduva; Attendance: 0 Referee: Gorka Sagués Oscoz |

| 24 June 2020 35 | Tenerife | 4–1 | Mirandés | Santa Cruz de Tenerife |
| 19:30 CEST (UTC+2) | | Report | | Stadium: Heliodoro Rodríguez López; Attendance: 0 Referee: Jon Ander González Esteban |

| 28 June 2020 36 | Mirandés | 2–2 | Almería | Miranda de Ebro |
| 17:00 CEST (UTC+2) | Guridi 23'; Matheus (yellow card) 81'; Sánchez (yellow card) 84' (yellow-red card) 84'; Merquelanz 90+9' (pen.) | Report | Vada 1'; Corpas 45+2'; Balliu (yellow card) 90+1'; Ćorić (yellow card) 90+2'; Costas (yellow card) 90+5'; Villalba (yellow card) 90+10' | Stadium: Anduva; Attendance: 0 Referee: Iñaki Vicandi Garrido |

| 1 July 2020 37 | Real Oviedo | 1–0 | Mirandés | Oviedo |
| 19:30 CEST (UTC+2) | Ortuño 41' (pen.); Tejera (yellow card) 64'; Lunin (yellow card) 89' | Report | Carlos Julio (yellow card) 17'; Rey (yellow card) 83' | Stadium: Carlos Tartiere; Attendance: 0 Referee: Iosu Galech Apezteguía |

| 4 July 2020 38 | Fuenlabrada | 2–2 | Mirandés | Fuenlabrada |
| 21:45 CEST (UTC+2) | Ciss (yellow card) 13' (yellow-red card) 21'; Iribas (yellow card) 27'; Fraile 71' (pen.); Chico (yellow card) 87'; Emanuel 90+1'; Martínez (yellow card) 90+5' | Report | Merquelanz 63'; González (yellow card) 70'; Matheus 77' (pen.) | Stadium: Estadio Fernando Torres; Attendance: 0 Referee: Rubén Ávalos Barrera |

| 7 July 2020 39 | Mirandés | 1–0 | Elche | Miranda de Ebro |
| 19:30 CEST (UTC+2) | Marcos André 54'; Crisetig (yellow card) 90+1' | Report | Josan (yellow card) 52'; Manuel (yellow card) 78' | Stadium: Anduva; Attendance: 0 Referee: Santiago Varón Aceitón |

| 11 July 2020 40 | Las Palmas | 1–0 | Mirandés | Las Palmas |
| 19:30 CEST (UTC+2) | Mantovani (yellow card) 36'; Rodríguez (yellow card) 71'; Lemos (yellow card) 73'; Castro 85' (pen.) | Report | González (yellow card) 80'; Franquesa (yellow card) 84'; Matheus (yellow card) 85' | Stadium: Estadio Gran Canaria; Attendance: 0 Referee: Álvaro Moreno Aragón |

| 17 July 2020 41 | Mirandés | 1–0 | Deportivo La Coruña | Miranda de Ebro |
| 21:00 CEST (UTC+2) | Malsa (yellow card) 7'; Merquelanz 23'; A. González (yellow card) 56'; Sánchez (yellow card) 64'; S. González (yellow card) 81'; Marcos André (yellow card) 89' | Report | Bóveda (yellow card) 22'; Mollejo (yellow card) 90+3' | Stadium: Anduva; Attendance: 0 Referee: Víctor Areces Franco |

| 20 July 2020 42 | Lugo | 2–1 | Mirandés | Lugo |
| 21:00 CEST (UTC+2) | Herrera 64', 84' | Report | Marcos André 45+3' | Stadium: Estadio Anxo Carro; Attendance: 2,679; Referee: Daniel Ocón Arráiz |

=== Copa del Rey ===
| 17 December 2019 First round | Coruxo | 4–5 (a.e.t.) | Mirandés | Vigo |
| 16:00 CET (UTC+1) | Al Watani 6'; Silva 20' (pen.); Añón 68', 71' (pen.) | Report | Matheus 7'; Vicente 18'; González 53'; Rey 90+2' (pen.); Merquelanz 119' | Stadium: O Vao; Attendance: 1,500; Referee: José Antonio López Toca |

| 11 January 2020 Second round | UCAM Murcia | 2–3 (a.e.t.) | Mirandés | Murcia |
| 12:00 CET (UTC+1) | Moreno 36'; Viti 80' | Report | González 57'; Vicente 61'; Rey 114' | Stadium: La Condomina; Attendance: 2,000; Referee: Rubén Ávalos Barrera |

| 23 January 2020 Round of 32 | Mirandés | 2–1 (a.e.t.) | Celta Vigo | Miranda de Ebro |
| 19:00 CET (UTC+1) | Matheus 28' (pen.); Kijera (yellow card) 37'; Vicente (yellow card) 45+1'; Merquelanz (yellow card) 70'; Sánchez 114', (yellow card) 117' | Report | Méndez (yellow card) 28'; Jorge (yellow card) 56'; Sisto 74'; Fontán (yellow card) 100'; Rafinha (red card) 111'; Aspas (yellow card) 111' | Stadium: Anduva; Attendance: 2,407; Referee: Juan Martínez Munuera |

| 30 January 2020 Round of 16 | Mirandés | 3–1 | Sevilla | Miranda de Ebro |
| 21:00 CET (UTC+1) | Matheus 7', 30', (yellow card) 55'; A. González (yellow card) 33'; Sánchez (yellow card) 78'; S. González (yellow card) 80'; Rey 85' | Report | Munir (yellow card) 37'; Diego Carlos (yellow card) 53'; Escudero (yellow card) 76'; Nolito 90', (yellow card) 90+1' | Stadium: Anduva; Attendance: 4,500; Referee: Santiago Jaime Latre |

| 5 February 2020 Quarter-finals | Mirandés | 4–2 | Villarreal | Miranda de Ebro |
| 21:00 CET (UTC+1) | Matheus 17'; Merquelanz 45+3', (yellow card) 90+1'; Onaindia 58'; Sánchez 90+2' | Report | Ontiveros 32'; Iborra (yellow card) 34'; Chakla (yellow card) 38'; Mario (yellow card) 52'; Cazorla 56' (pen.), (yellow card) 78'; Chukwueze (yellow card) 64' | Stadium: Anduva; Attendance: 4,428; Referee: Ricardo de Burgos Bengoetxea |

| 13 February 2020 Semi-finals; First leg | Real Sociedad | 2–1 | Mirandés | San Sebastián |
| 21:00 CET (UTC+1) | Oyarzabal 9' (pen.), (yellow card) 48'; Monreal (yellow card) 17'; Ødegaard 42'; Zaldúa (yellow card) 82' | Report | Matheus 39'; Kijera (yellow card) 45+2' | Stadium: Anoeta; Attendance: 35,194; Referee: Jesús Gil Manzano |

| 4 March 2020 Semi-finals; Second leg | Mirandés | 0–1 (1–3 agg.) | Real Sociedad | Miranda de Ebro |
| 21:00 CET (UTC+1) | González (yellow card) 31'; Rey (yellow card) 72'; Barco (yellow card) 83' | Report | Monreal (yellow card) 32'; Oyarzabal 41' (pen.); Willian José (yellow card) 50'; Januzaj (yellow card) 72'; Zaldúa (yellow card) 90+1' | Stadium: Anduva; Attendance: 5,583; Referee: José María Sánchez Martínez |

== Statistics ==
=== Appearances and goals ===
Last updated on 20 July 2020.

| No. | Pos | Nat | Player | Total | | Segunda División | | Copa del Rey | |
| No. | Pos | Nat | Player | Apps | Goals | Apps | Goals | Apps | Goals |
Goalkeepers
| 1 | GK | (Spain) ESP | Limones | 38 | 0 | 33 | 0 | 5 | 0 |
| 25 | GK | (Spain) ESP | Raúl Lizoain | 10 | 0 | 9+1 | 0 | 0 | 0 |
| 31 | GK | (Spain) ESP | Alberto González | 0 | 0 | 0 | 0 | 0 | 0 |
Defenders
| 2 | DF | (Dominican Republic) DOM | Carlos Julio | 30 | 0 | 23+4 | 0 | 0+3 | 0 |
| 3 | DF | (Spain) ESP | Gorka Kijera | 37 | 0 | 25+6 | 0 | 4+2 | 0 |
| 4 | DF | (Spain) ESP | Sergio González | 33 | 2 | 27+1 | 1 | 5 | 1 |
| 5 | DF | (Spain) ESP | Odei Onaindia | 37 | 2 | 31 | 1 | 6 | 1 |
| 6 | DF | (France) FRA | Modibo Sagnan | 13 | 0 | 12+1 | 0 | 0 | 0 |
| 20 | DF | (Venezuela) VEN | Alexander González | 32 | 1 | 20+6 | 0 | 6 | 1 |
| 26 | DF | (Spain) ESP | Enric Franquesa | 27 | 0 | 18+5 | 0 | 4 | 0 |
Midfielders
| 7 | MF | (Spain) ESP | Álvaro Peña | 40 | 2 | 20+14 | 2 | 5+1 | 0 |
| 8 | MF | (Italy) ITA | Lorenzo Crisetig | 9 | 0 | 4+5 | 0 | 0 | 0 |
| 10 | MF | (Spain) ESP | Álvaro Rey | 41 | 8 | 25+9 | 5 | 6+1 | 3 |
| 11 | MF | (Spain) ESP | Martín Merquelanz | 43 | 17 | 31+5 | 15 | 5+2 | 2 |
| 14 | MF | (Spain) ESP | Joaquín Muñoz | 23 | 1 | 15+8 | 1 | 0 | 0 |
| 15 | MF | (Martinique) MTQ | Mickaël Malsa | 37 | 0 | 29+1 | 0 | 6+1 | 0 |
| 19 | MF | (Ghana) GHA | Ernest Ohemeng | 11 | 0 | 0+11 | 0 | 0 | 0 |
| 23 | MF | (Spain) ESP | Jon Guridi | 41 | 3 | 33+3 | 3 | 3+2 | 0 |
| 28 | MF | (Spain) ESP | Antonio Sánchez | 40 | 4 | 31+3 | 2 | 4+2 | 2 |
Forwards
| 9 | FW | (Brazil) BRA | Matheus Aiás | 34 | 12 | 7+20 | 6 | 7 | 6 |
| 17 | FW | (Spain) ESP | Iñigo Vicente | 36 | 5 | 18+14 | 3 | 3+1 | 2 |
| 18 | FW | (Spain) ESP | Mario Barco | 19 | 3 | 4+13 | 3 | 1+1 | 0 |
| 22 | FW | (Brazil) BRA | Marcos André | 38 | 12 | 35+3 | 12 | 0 | 0 |
Players who have made an appearance or had a squad number this season but have left the club
| 6 | MF | (Spain) ESP | Andrés García | 10 | 1 | 5+3 | 1 | 2 | 0 |
| 8 | MF | (Spain) ESP | Galder Cerrajería | 4 | 0 | 2+1 | 0 | 0+1 | 0 |
| 13 | GK | (Portugal) POR | João Costa | 3 | 0 | 1 | 0 | 2 | 0 |
| 16 | MF | (Togo) TOG | Simon Gbegnon | 5 | 0 | 4 | 0 | 1 | 0 |
| 21 | DF | (Uruguay) URU | Cristian González | 12 | 1 | 8+2 | 0 | 2 | 1 |
