= Limones =

Limones (Spanish for "lemons") may refer to:

- An alternate name for Valdez, Esmeraldas, Ecuador
- Limones, Chiriquí, Panama
- Limones, Yabucoa, Puerto Rico, a barrio
- Limones (footballer) (born 1986), Spanish footballer
- Limones (Maya site), Mexico
