= Raúl Lizoain =

Spanish footballer

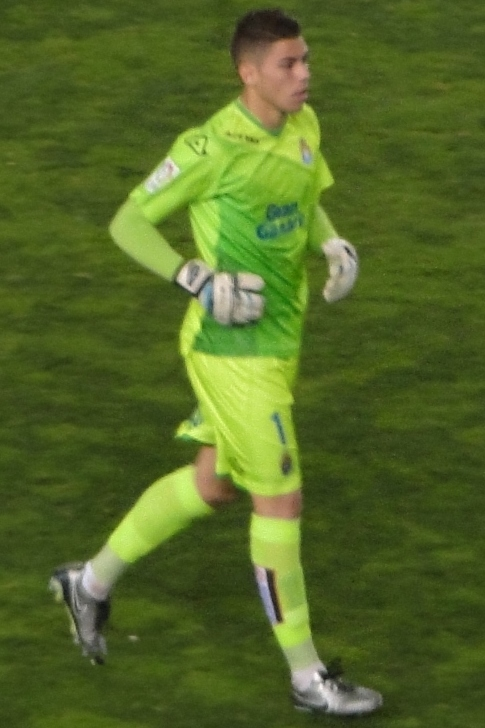
- Lizoain with Las Palmas in 2015

Personal information
- Full name: Raúl Lizoain Cruz
- Date of birth: 27 January 1991 (age 35)
- Place of birth: Las Palmas, Spain
- Height: 1.88 m (6 ft 2 in)
- Position: Goalkeeper

Team information
- Current team: Granada
- Number: 13

Youth career
- Las Palmas
- 2006–2009: Unión Viera
- 2009–2010: Las Palmas

Senior career*
Years	Team	Apps	(Gls)
2010–2011	Las Palmas B	4	(0)
2011–2018	Las Palmas	58	(0)
2018–2019	Alcorcón	12	(0)
2020–2022	Mirandés	84	(0)
2022–2024	Andorra	16	(0)
2023–2024	→ Cartagena (loan)	19	(0)
2024–2026	Albacete	58	(0)
2026–	Granada	3	(0)
- * Club domestic league appearances and goals as of 02:35, 31 August 2026 (UTC)

Raúl Lizoain Cruz (born 27 January 1991) is a Spanish professional footballer who plays as a goalkeeper for Segunda División club Granada.

== Club career ==
=== Las Palmas ===
Born in Las Palmas, Canary Islands, Lizoain came through the youth ranks of local Las Palmas, playing one season with the B team in the Tercera División. He was promoted to the main squad for the 2011–12 campaign.

Lizoain made his official debut with the first team on 26 November 2011, coming off the bench for field player Javier Portillo in a 2–0 Segunda División away loss against Huesca. He was mainly used as a backup to Mariano Barbosa in the following years.

After Barbosa's departure to Sevilla, Lizoain battled for the first-choice status with new signing Casto. He began the season as a starter, but returned to the bench in December 2014; in May of the following year, after Casto's injury, he retained his place in the starting XI and also appeared in the play-offs.

Lizoain made his debut in La Liga on 22 August 2015, in a 1–0 defeat at Atlético Madrid. On 2 August 2018, after suffering relegation, he terminated his contract.

=== Alcorcón ===
On 13 August 2018, Lizoain signed a two-year deal with second division club Alcorcón. On 27 August of the following year, after playing second-fiddle to Dani Jiménez, he was released.

=== Mirandés ===
Days after his release from Alcorcón, Lizoain signed for Málaga, but the transfer was invalidated by the league as his wage was considered above the Andalusian club's limit. He remained without a team until 26 January 2020, when he arrived at Mirandés to compete with veteran Limones.

=== Andorra ===
On 7 July 2022, free agent Lizoain agreed to a two-year contract at second-tier newcomers Andorra. A backup to Nico Ratti during the campaign, he was loaned to Cartagena of the same league in August 2023.

=== Later career ===
On 1 July 2024, Lizoain signed a two-year deal with Albacete also in the second division. He remained in the league for 2026–27, joining Granada.

== Personal life ==
Lizoain is the nephew of blind singer Serafín Zubiri.

== Career statistics ==
As of match played on 2 June 2024

Appearances and goals by club, season and competition
Club	Season	League			Cup		Other		Total	
Club	Season	Division	Apps	Goals	Apps	Goals	Apps	Goals	Apps	Goals
Las Palmas	2010–11	Segunda División	0	0	0	0	—		0	0
Las Palmas	2011–12	Segunda División	6	0	0	0	—		6	0
Las Palmas	2012–13	Segunda División	3	0	0	0	0	0	3	0
Las Palmas	2013–14	Segunda División	2	0	3	0	0	0	5	0
Las Palmas	2014–15	Segunda División	12	0	3	0	3	0	18	0
Las Palmas	2015–16	La Liga	8	0	6	0	—		14	0
Las Palmas	2016–17	La Liga	13	0	4	0	—		17	0
Las Palmas	2017–18	La Liga	11	0	2	0	—		13	0
Las Palmas	Total		55	0	18	0	3	0	76	0
Alcorcón	2018–19	Segunda División	12	0	2	0	—		14	0
Alcorcón	2019–20	Segunda División	0	0	—		—		0	0
Alcorcón	Total		12	0	2	0	—		14	0
Mirandés	2019–20	Segunda División	9	0	0	0	—		9	0
Mirandés	2020–21	Segunda División	36	0	0	0	—		36	0
Mirandés	2021–22	Segunda División	39	0	0	0	—		39	7
Mirandés	Total		84	0	0	0	—		84	0
Andorra	2022–23	Segunda División	16	0	0	0	—		16	0
Andorra	2023–24	Segunda División	0	0	—		—		0	0
Andorra	Total		16	0	0	0	—		16	0
Cartagena (loan)	2023–24	Segunda División	19	0	3	0	—		22	0
Career total			186	0	23	0	3	0	212	0
