= Uson (disambiguation) =

Uson or Usón can refer to:

== Places ==
- Uson, Masbate, a municipality in the Philippines
- Uson Island, an island in the municipality of Coron, Palawan, Philippines
- Usón, a village in the municipality of Huerto, Aragon, Spain

== People ==
- Bobit Uson, member of the Filipino rock band AfterImage
- Chusé Raúl Usón (born 1966), a Spanish writer
- Francisco Usón, a Venezuelan general
- Marc Fernández Usón (born 1987), a Spanish basketball player
- Mocha Uson (born 1982), a Filipino singer, dancer, model, activist, and blogger

== See also ==
- Usson (disambiguation)
- Uzon
