= Ulfsson =

Ulfsson is a Scandinavian patronym and a surname. Notable people with the name include:

- Gunnbjörn Ulfsson (Norwegian, lived circa 10th century), the first European to sight North America
- Jakob Ulfsson (died 1521), Archbishop of Uppsala, Sweden, 1469–1515 and founder of Uppsala University
- Karl Ulfsson, Lord of Tofta (ca. 1317 – 1407-11), Swedish magnate and High Constable of Sweden
- Ragnvald Ulfsson (beginning 11th century) was a jarl of Västergötland or Östergötland
- Sveinn Ulfsson (1019–1074), King of Denmark from 1047 until his death in 1074

== See also ==
- Usson (disambiguation)
