= Antonio Caballero =

Antonio Caballero may refer to:

- Antonio Caballero y Góngora (1723–1796), Spanish archbishop
- Antonio Caballero (boxer) (born 1967), Spanish boxer
- Antonio Caballero (footballer) (born 1994), Spanish footballer
