= Sergio Moreno (footballer, born 1999) =

Spanish footballer (born 1999)

Personal information
- Full name: Sergio Moreno Martínez
- Date of birth: 1 January 1999 (age 27)
- Place of birth: Pamplona, Spain
- Height: 1.78 m (5 ft 10 in)
- Position: Forward

Team information
- Current team: Teruel
- Number: 7

Youth career
- Alcalá
- Atlético Madrid
- Tenerife
- 2016–2018: Rayo Vallecano

Senior career*
Years	Team	Apps	(Gls)
2018–2019	Rayo Vallecano B	35	(12)
2018–2023	Rayo Vallecano	2	(0)
2019–2020	→ Valencia B (loan)	25	(5)
2020–2021	→ Mirandés (loan)	23	(2)
2022	→ Amorebieta (loan)	16	(0)
2022–2023	→ Osasuna B (loan)	29	(1)
2023–2024	Estepona	26	(4)
2024–2025	Atlético Baleares	26	(4)
2025–	Teruel	35	(3)
- * Club domestic league appearances and goals as of 10 June 2026

Sergio Moreno Martínez (Spanish pronunciation: [ˈseɾxjo moˈɾeno]; born 1 January 1999) is a Spanish professional footballer who plays as a forward for Primera Federación club Teruel.

== Career ==
Born in Pamplona, Navarre, Moreno finished his formation with Rayo Vallecano, after spells at CD Tenerife, Atlético Madrid and RSD Alcalá. He made his senior debut with the reserves on 14 January 2018, playing the last 36 minutes in a 1–0 Tercera División home loss against Getafe CF B.

Moreno scored his first senior goals on 29 April 2018, netting a brace in a 2–0 home defeat of AD Colmenar Viejo. He made his first team – and La Liga – debut on 25 August 2018, coming on as a late substitute for fellow debutant Álvaro García in a 1–0 away loss against Atlético Madrid.

On 2 September 2019, Moreno moved to another reserve team, Valencia CF Mestalla in Segunda División B, on a one-year loan deal. On 5 October of the following year, he moved to Segunda División side CD Mirandés also in a temporary deal.

Moreno scored his first professional goal on 7 November 2020, netting the game's only in a home success over Sporting de Gijón. He returned to Rayo the following July, but after only two cup appearances, he moved out on loan to SD Amorebieta in the second division on 18 January 2022.

On 30 August 2022, Moreno was loaned to Primera Federación side CA Osasuna B, for one year.

On 27 August 2024, Moreno was announced at CD Atlético Baleares.

== Career statistics ==
As of match played 11 April 2021

Appearances and goals by club, season and competition
Club	Season	League			National cup		Other		Total	
Club	Season	Division	Apps	Goals	Apps	Goals	Apps	Goals	Apps	Goals
Rayo Vallecano	2018–19	La Liga	1	0	2	0	—		3	0
Rayo Vallecano	2020–21	Segunda División	1	0	0	0	—		1	0
Rayo Vallecano	2021–22	La Liga	0	0	0	0	—		0	0
Rayo Vallecano	Total		2	0	2	0	0	0	4	0
Valencia B (loan)	2019–20	Segunda División B	25	5	—		—		25	5
Mirandés (loan)	2020–21	Segunda División	23	2	1	0	—		24	2
Career total			50	7	3	0	0	0	53	7
