= Juan Berrocal =

Spanish footballer (born 1999)

Personal information
- Full name: Juan Berrocal González
- Date of birth: 5 February 1999 (age 27)
- Place of birth: Jerez de la Frontera, Spain
- Height: 1.84 m (6 ft 0 in)
- Position: Centre back

Team information
- Current team: Málaga
- Number: 25

Youth career
- Sevilla

Senior career*
Years	Team	Apps	(Gls)
2017–2020	Sevilla B	78	(0)
2018–2022	Sevilla	0	(0)
2020–2021	→ Mirandés (loan)	38	(2)
2021–2022	→ Sporting Gijón (loan)	28	(0)
2022–2024	Eibar	67	(2)
2024–2026	Getafe	19	(0)
2025–2026	→ Atlanta United (loan)	19	(0)
2026–	Málaga	0	(0)

International career
2017–2018	Spain U19	6	(0)
- * Club domestic league appearances and goals as of 23 June 2026

Juan Berrocal González (born 5 February 1999) is a Spanish professional footballer who plays as a centre-back for La Liga club Málaga CF.

== Club career ==
Born in Jerez de la Frontera, Cádiz, Andalusia, Berrocal was a Sevilla FC youth graduate. He made his senior debut with the reserves on 3 September 2017, starting in a 1–2 home loss against Cultural y Deportiva Leonesa in the Segunda División.

On 3 July 2018, Berrocal renewed his contract until 2022. He made his first-team and European debut on 9 August, starting and playing the full match in a 1–0 home win against FK Žalgiris, in the third qualifying round of the 2018–19 UEFA Europa League.

On 25 August 2020, Berrocal joined CD Mirandés in the second division, on loan for the season. The following 22 July, he moved to fellow league team Sporting de Gijón also in a temporary deal.

On 11 July 2022, Sevilla announced the transfer of Berrocal to SD Eibar in the second division. On 19 August 2024, he signed a three-year deal with La Liga side Getafe CF.

Berrocal made his debut in the top tier of Spanish football on 14 September 2024, starting in a 1–0 away loss to former side Sevilla. The following 25 July, after being sparingly used, he moved abroad for the first time in his career and joined Major League Soccer side Atlanta United FC on a one-year loan deal, with a buyout clause.

On 1 September 2026, Berrocal moved to fellow first division side Málaga CF on a one-year contract, after terminating his link with Geta.

== Career statistics ==
=== Club ===
As of match played 28 May 2022

Appearances and goals by club, season and competition
Club	Season	League			National Cup		Continental		Total	
Club	Season	Division	Apps	Goals	Apps	Goals	Apps	Goals	Apps	Goals
Sevilla B	2017–18	Segunda División	30	0	—		—		30	0
Sevilla B	2018–19	Segunda División B	25	0	—		—		25	0
Sevilla B	2019–20	Segunda División B	23	0	—		—		23	0
Sevilla B	Total		78	0	0	0	0	0	78	0
Sevilla	2018–19	La Liga	0	0	0	0	3 (Note: Appearance(s) in UEFA Europa League)	0	3	0
Mirandés (loan)	2020–21	Segunda División	38	2	1	0	—		39	2
Sporting Gijón	2021–22	La Liga	28	0	4	0	—		32	0
Career total			144	2	5	0	3	0	152	2
