= Martín Merquelanz =

Spanish footballer (born 1995)

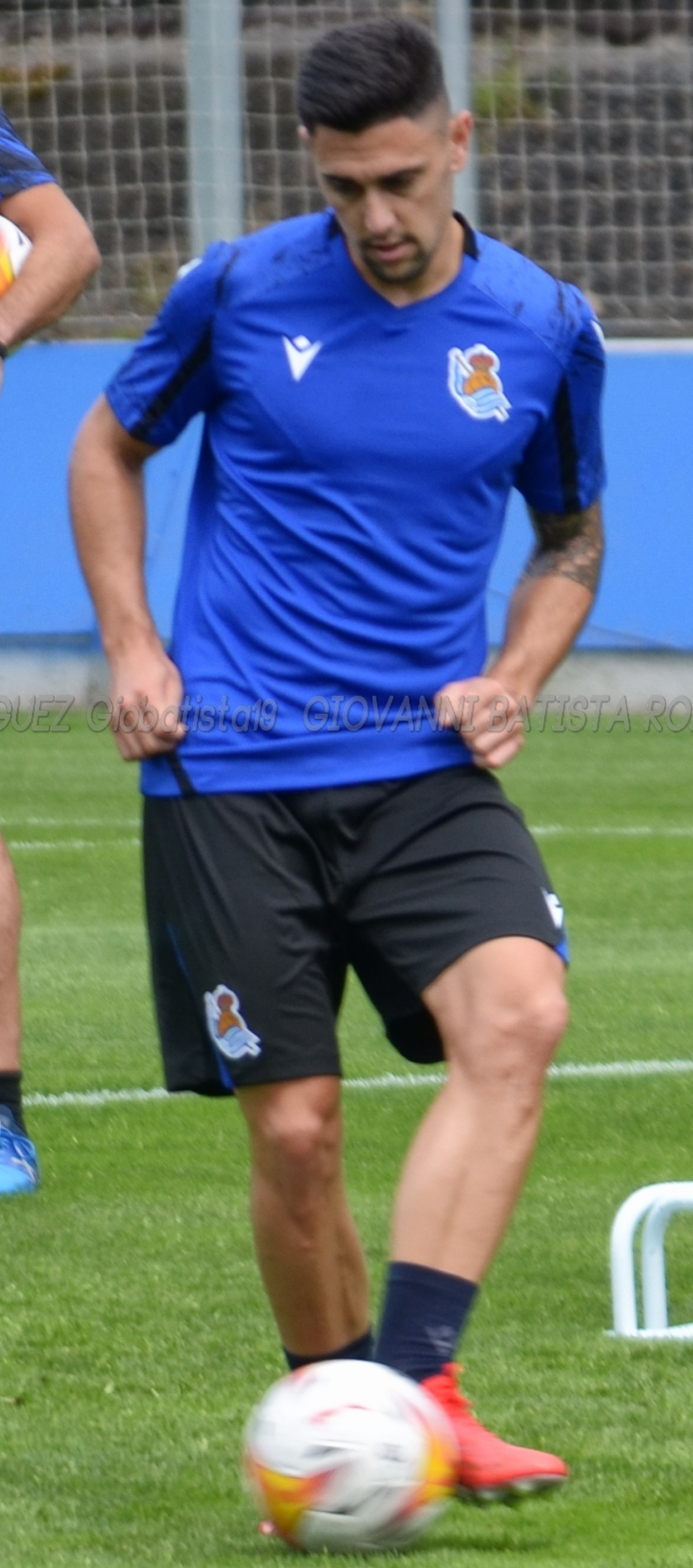

Personal information
- Full name: Martín Merquelanz Castellanos
- Date of birth: 12 June 1995 (age 31)
- Place of birth: Irun, Spain
- Height: 1.76 m (5 ft 9 in)
- Position: Winger

Youth career
- 2009–2012: Antiguoko
- 2012–2014: Real Sociedad

Senior career*
| Years | Team | Apps | (Gls) |
| 2014–2018 | Real Sociedad B | 100 | (17) |
| 2018–2024 | Real Sociedad | 14 | (0) |
| 2019–2020 | → Mirandés (loan) | 36 | (15) |
| 2021–2022 | → Rayo Vallecano (loan) | 4 | (0) |
| 2024–2025 | Eibar | 15 | (0) |
| 2025–2026 | Andorra | 1 | (0) |
| 2026 | Kitchee | 6 | (2) |
- * Club domestic league appearances and goals as of 17 May 2026

Martín Merquelanz Castellanos (born 12 June 1995) is a Spanish professional footballer who plays as a left winger.

== Career ==
Born in Irun, Gipuzkoa, Basque Country (Spain), Merquelanz joined Real Sociedad's youth setup in 2012, from Antiguoko. He was promoted to the reserves on 23 June 2014, and made his senior debut on 31 August by coming on as a second-half substitute for Pablo Hervías in a 3–0 Segunda División B away loss against CD Tudelano.

Merquelanz scored his first senior goal on 20 September 2015, netting the second in a 5–0 away routing of CD Mensajero. Roughly one year later, he scored a hat-trick in a 4–0 home thrashing of Gernika Club, and finished the 2016–17 campaign with ten goals in 36 matches.

Merquelanz renewed his contract until 2019 on 17 May 2017, but suffered a serious knee injury in December, which kept him out for the remainder of the campaign. The following 12 January, he extended his contract until 2020.

On 14 August 2018, Merquelanz was definitely promoted to the main squad in La Liga. He made his debut in the category on 31 August, replacing Asier Illarramendi in a 2–1 away loss against SD Eibar, but being taken off three minutes later due to an injury.

On 19 July 2019, after spending the campaign nursing his knee injury, Merquelanz joined Segunda División side CD Mirandés on loan for one year. He scored his first professional goal on 24 August, netting the equalizer in a 2–1 home loss against Cádiz CF. Merquelanz was a regular starter for the Castilian-Leonese side, scoring a career-best 15 goals and helping the club avoid relegation and reach the semi-finals of the Copa del Rey.

Upon returning to Real Sociedad, Merquelanz agreed to a contract extension with the club until 2025 on 8 August 2020. Roughly one year later, after featuring sparingly, he was loaned to fellow top tier side Rayo Vallecano for the season.

In September 2021, Merquelanz suffered another knee injury during a match against Levante UD, being sidelined for the remainder of the campaign. He suffered a setback from his injury in May 2022, which led him to miss the entire 2022–23 season, and underwent a new surgery in June 2023.

Merquelanz returned to trainings in December 2023, but still failed to feature a single minute during the 2023–24 season after being unregistered. He terminated his contract with the Txuri-urdin on 23 July 2024, and agreed to a one-year deal with SD Eibar in the second division the following day, subject to a trial period.

On 3 October 2025, free agent Merquelanz signed a one-year deal with FC Andorra also in division two. The following 12 January, after just two matches, he left the club.

On 4 February 2026, Merquelanz joined Hong Kong Premier League club Kitchee.

== Career statistics ==
As of match played 22 August 2021

Appearances and goals by club, season and competition
| Club | Season | League | | | National Cup | | Continental | | Total | |
| Club | Season | Division | Apps | Goals | Apps | Goals | Apps | Goals | Apps | Goals |
|---|---|---|---|---|---|---|---|---|---|---|
| Real Sociedad B | 2014–15 | Segunda División B | 17 | 0 | — | | — | | 17 | 0 |
| Real Sociedad B | 2015–16 | Segunda División B | 29 | 2 | — | | — | | 29 | 2 |
| Real Sociedad B | 2016–17 | Segunda División B | 36 | 10 | — | | — | | 36 | 10 |
| Real Sociedad B | 2017–18 | Segunda División B | 18 | 5 | — | | — | | 18 | 5 |
| Real Sociedad B | Total | | 100 | 17 | 0 | 0 | 0 | 0 | 100 | 17 |
| Real Sociedad | 2018–19 | La Liga | 1 | 0 | 0 | 0 | — | | 1 | 0 |
| Real Sociedad | 2020–21 | La Liga | 13 | 0 | 2 | 0 | 2 (Note: Appearance(s) in UEFA Europa League) | 0 | 17 | 0 |
| Real Sociedad | Total | | 14 | 0 | 2 | 0 | 2 | 0 | 18 | 0 |
| Mirandés (loan) | 2019–20 | Segunda División | 36 | 15 | 7 | 2 | — | | 43 | 17 |
| Rayo Vallecano (loan) | 2021–22 | La Liga | 2 | 0 | 0 | 0 | — | | 2 | 0 |
| Career total | | | 152 | 32 | 9 | 2 | 2 | 0 | 163 | 34 |

== Honours ==
Kitchee

- Hong Kong Premier League: 2025–26
