= 2022–23 FC Andorra season =

FC Andorra
2022–23 season
- Manager: Eder Sarabia
- Stadium: Estadi Nacional
- Segunda División: 7th
- Copa del Rey: Second round
- Copa Catalunya: Winners
- Top goalscorer: League: Sinan Bakış (12); All: Sinan Bakış (14)
Home colours

The 2022–23 season was the FC Andorra's 81st season in existence and the first in its history in the Segunda División. The club is based in the Pyrenean country of Andorra, but is active in the Spanish football pyramid.

== Transfers ==
=== In ===
Pos.	Player	Transferred from	Fee	Date	Source
DF	(Spain) Diego Alende	(Spain) Real Valladolid	Free	14 July 2022	
MF	(Spain) Jandro Orellana	(Spain) Barça Atlètic	Free	22 July 2022	
DF	(Spain) Mika Mármol	(Spain) Barça Atlètic	Free	30 August 2022	

=== Out ===
Pos.	Player	Transferred to	Fee	Date	Source
MF	(Spain) Martí Riverola	(Andorra) Atlètic d'Escaldes	Free	1 September 2022	
DF	(Spain) Roger Riera	(Spain) Hércules	Free	6 September 2022	
MF	(Spain) Marc Fernández	(Spain) Gimnàstic de Tarragona	Free	1 January 2023	

== Pre-season and friendlies ==
19 July 2022 Friendly	Leganés	0–2	Andorra	San Pedro del Pinatar
19:00

22 July 2022 Friendly	Real Murcia	0–0	Andorra	San Pedro del Pinatar
19:00

27 July 2022 Friendly	Girona	2–0	Andorra	Caldes de Malavella
19:00				Stadium: Centre d'Entrenament La Vinya

29 July 2022 Friendly	Andorra	3–1	Espanyol B	Navata
18:30				Stadium: Torremirona

3 August 2022 Friendly	Barcelona Atlètic	0–1	Andorra	Barcelona
19:00				Stadium: Johan Cruyff Stadium

5 August 2022 Friendly	Huesca	3–1	Andorra	Huesca
19:00				Stadium: Estadio El Alcoraz

7 August 2022 Friendly	Lleida Esportiu	1–0	Andorra	Lleida
19:00				Stadium: Camp d'Esports

== Competitions ==
=== Overall record ===
Competition	First match	Last match	Starting round	Final position	Record							
Competition	First match	Last match	Starting round	Final position	Pld	W	D	L	GF	GA	GD	Win %
Segunda División	15 August 2022	27 May 2023	Matchday 1	7th	42	16	11	15	47	37	+10	38.10
Copa del Rey	12 November 2022	21 December 2022	First round	Second round	2	1	0	1	4	3	+1	50.00
Copa Catalunya	16 November 2022	15 February 2023	Semi-finals	Winners	2	2	0	0	2	0	+2	100.00
Total					46	19	11	16	53	40	+13	41.30

Source: Competitions

=== Segunda División ===
==== League table ====
Pos	Team	Pld	W	D	L	GF	GA	GD	Pts	Qualification or relegation
5	Eibar	42	19	14	9	45	36	+9	71 (Note: Alavés finished ahead of Eibar on head-to-head points: Eibar 0–0 Alavés, Alavés 2–0 Eibar.)	Qualification for promotion play-offs
6	Albacete	42	17	16	9	58	47	+11	67	Qualification for promotion play-offs
7	Andorra	42	16	11	15	47	37	+10	59 (Note: Andorra finished ahead of Oviedo on head-to-head points: Oviedo 0–1 Andorra, Andorra 3–1 Oviedo.)	
8	Oviedo	42	16	11	15	34	35	−1	59	
9	Cartagena	42	16	10	16	47	49	−2	58	

Source: LaLiga SmartBank
Rules for classification: 1) points; 2) head-to-head points; 3) head-to-head goal difference; 4) goal difference; 5) number of goals scored
Notes:

Notes

1. Reserve teams are not eligible for promotion to the same league as the first team.

==== Results summary ====
Overall								Home						Away					
Pld	W	D	L	GF	GA	GD	Pts	W	D	L	GF	GA	GD	W	D	L	GF	GA	GD
42	16	11	15	47	37	+10	59	11	3	7	27	15	+12	5	8	8	20	22	−2

Source: Soccerway

==== Results by round ====
Round	1	2	3	4	5	6	7	8	9	10	11	12	13	14	15	16	17	18	19	20	21	22	23	24	25	26	27	28	29	30	31	32	33	34	35	36	37	38	39	40	41	42
Ground	A	A	A	H	A	H	A	H	A	H	H	A	H	A	H	H	A	H	A	H	A	H	A	H	A	H	A	H	A	H	A	H	A	H	A	H	A	H	A	H	A	H
Result	W	L	L	W	D	W	D	W	D	L	L	L	W	W	L	W	W	L	L	D	D	W	L	L	L	L	L	W	L	D	W	D	D	W	D	W	W	L	D	W	D	W
Position																																										

A = Away; H = Home; W = Win; D = Draw; L = Loss

==== Matches ====
The league fixtures were announced on 23 June 2022.

15 August 2022 1	Real Oviedo	0–1	Andorra	Oviedo

20 August 2022 2	Sporting Gijón	4–1	Andorra	Gijón

29 August 2022 3	UD Las Palmas	2–0	Andorra	Las Palmas

4 September 2022 4	Andorra	1–0	Granada CF	Andorra la Vella
				Stadium: Estadi Nacional

11 September 2022 5	CD Mirandés	1–1	Andorra	Miranda de Ebro

17 September 2022 6	Andorra	2–0	SD Eibar	Andorra la Vella
				Stadium: Estadi Nacional

25 September 2022 7	Albacete	1–1	Andorra	Albacete

1 October 2022 8	Andorra	3–1	Levante UD	Andorra la Vella
				Stadium: Estadi Nacional

9 October 2022 9	Málaga CF	0–0	Andorra	Málaga

12 October 2022 10	Andorra	0–1	Burgos CF	Andorra la Vella
				Stadium: Estadi Nacional

15 October 2022 11	Andorra	0–1	Alavés	Andorra la Vella
				Stadium: Estadi Nacional

22 October 2022 12	Villarreal B	1–0	Andorra	Villarreal
				Stadium: Ciudad Deportiva Villarreal CF

29 October 2022 13	Andorra	3–0	SD Ponferradina	Andorra la Vella
				Stadium: Estadi Nacional

1 November 2022 14	Real Zaragoza	0–2	Andorra	Zaragoza

5 November 2022 15	Andorra	0–1	Racing Santander	Andorra la Vella
				Stadium: Estadi Nacional

20 November 2022 16	Andorra	4–0	CD Lugo	Andorra la Vella
				Stadium: Estadi Nacional

28 November 2022 17	Ibiza	0–1	Andorra	Zaragoza
				Stadium: Estadi Municipal de Can Misses

4 December 2022 18	Andorra	0–1	FC Cartagena	Andorra la Vella
				Stadium: Estadi Nacional

7 December 2022 19	Huesca	1–0	Andorra	Huesca

10 December 2022 20	Andorra	1–1	Leganés	Andorra la Vella
				Stadium: Estadi Nacional

16 December 2022 21	Tenerife	1–1	Andorra	Santa Cruz de Tenerife

7 January 2023 22	Andorra	3–1	Real Oviedo	Andorra la Vella
				Stadium: Estadi Nacional

23 January 2023 24	Andorra	0–1	Albacete	Andorra la Vella
				Stadium: Estadi Nacional

5 February 2023 26	Andorra	0–1	Real Zaragoza	Andorra la Vella
				Stadium: Estadi Nacional

19 February 2023 28	Andorra	1–0	Sporting Gijón	Andorra la Vella
				Stadium: Estadi Nacional

3 March 2023 30	Andorra	0–0	UD Las Palmas	Andorra la Vella
				Stadium: Estadi Nacional

18 March 2023 32	Andorra	2–2	UD Ibiza	Andorra la Vella
				Stadium: Estadi Nacional

2 April 2023 34	Andorra	1–0	Málaga CF	Andorra la Vella
				Stadium: Estadi Nacional

16 April 2023 36	Andorra	1–0	SD Huesca	Andorra la Vella
				Stadium: Estadi Nacional

30 April 2023 38	Andorra	0–1	CD Mirandés	Andorra la Vella
				Stadium: Estadi Nacional

14 May 2023 40	Andorra	1–0	CD Tenerife	Andorra la Vella
				Stadium: Estadi Nacional

27 May 2023 42	Andorra	4–3	Villarreal B	Andorra la Vella
				Stadium: Estadi Nacional

=== Copa del Rey ===
12 November 2022 First round	Manacor	1–3	Andorra	Manacor
16:00	Rubio Sánchez 60'		Casadesús 35'; Fernández 50'; González 55'	Stadium: Poliesportiu Municipal Na Capellera; Referee: Iván Caparrós Hernández

21 December 2022 Second round	Levante	2–1	Andorra	Valencia
19:00	Brugué 12'; Cantero 42'		Gil 59'	Stadium: Estadi Ciutat de València; Referee: Iosu Galech Apezteguía

=== Copa Catalunya ===
16 November 2022 Semi-finals	Olot	0–1	Andorra	Olot
19:15			Bakış 81'	Stadium: Camp Municipal d'Olot

15 February 2023 Final	Andorra	1–0	Badalona	Badalona
20:45	Bakış 90+2'			Stadium: Estadi Municipal de Badalona
