= Álvaro Aguirre =

Spanish footballer (born 2000)

Personal information
- Full name: Álvaro Aguirre Arévalo
- Date of birth: 3 February 2000 (age 26)
- Place of birth: Madrid, Spain
- Position: Winger

Team information
- Current team: Rayo Vallecano B
- Number: 7

Youth career
- Alcobendas
- 2014–2019: Rayo Vallecano

Senior career*
Years	Team	Apps	(Gls)
2019–2023	Rayo Vallecano B	69	(4)
2022–2023	Rayo Vallecano	1	(0)
2023	Leganés B	12	(0)
2023–2024	Móstoles URJC	26	(2)
- * Club domestic league appearances and goals as of 26 May 2024

Álvaro Aguirre Arévalo (born 3 February 2000) is a Spanish professional footballer who plays as a winger.

== Club career ==
Born in Madrid, Aguirre joined Rayo Vallecano's youth setup in 2014, from Alcobendas CF. He made his senior debut with the reserves on 27 April 2019, coming on as a second-half substitute in a 1–1 Tercera División away draw against RSD Alcalá.

Aguirre scored his first senior goal on 21 March 2021, netting the B's second in a 5–1 away routing of CF Pozuelo de Alarcón. On 27 July, he renewed his contract for a further year.

Aguirre made his first team – and La Liga – debut on 2 January 2022, replacing Sergi Guardiola late into a 0–2 away loss against Atlético Madrid.
