= Vere (footballer) =

Spanish footballer

Personal information
- Full name: Alejandro Asensio Crespillo
- Date of birth: 14 September 2000 (age 26)
- Place of birth: Madrid, Spain
- Position: Winger

Team information
- Current team: Rayo Vallecano B
- Number: 18

Youth career
- Torrejón

Senior career*
Years	Team	Apps	(Gls)
2019–2020	Torrejón B	18	(3)
2020–2021	Torrejón	18	(3)
2021–	Rayo Vallecano B	30	(3)
2022–	Rayo Vallecano	1	(0)
- * Club domestic league appearances and goals as of 8 October 2022

Alejandro Asensio Crespillo (born 14 September 2000), commonly known as Vere, is a Spanish footballer who plays as a left winger for Rayo Vallecano B.

== Club career ==
An AD Torrejón CF youth graduate, Vere made his senior debut with the reserve team during the 2019–20 season, in the Preferente de Madrid. He started to feature with the first team in Tercera División in November 2020, being mainly used as a substitute.

Vere moved to Rayo Vallecano on 24 July 2021, being initially assigned to the B-side in Tercera División RFEF. He impressed with the B-team during the first months of 2022, and made his first team – and La Liga – debut on 12 May 2022, replacing Álvaro García late into a 1–5 home loss against Villarreal CF.
