= Sergi Guardiola =

Spanish footballer

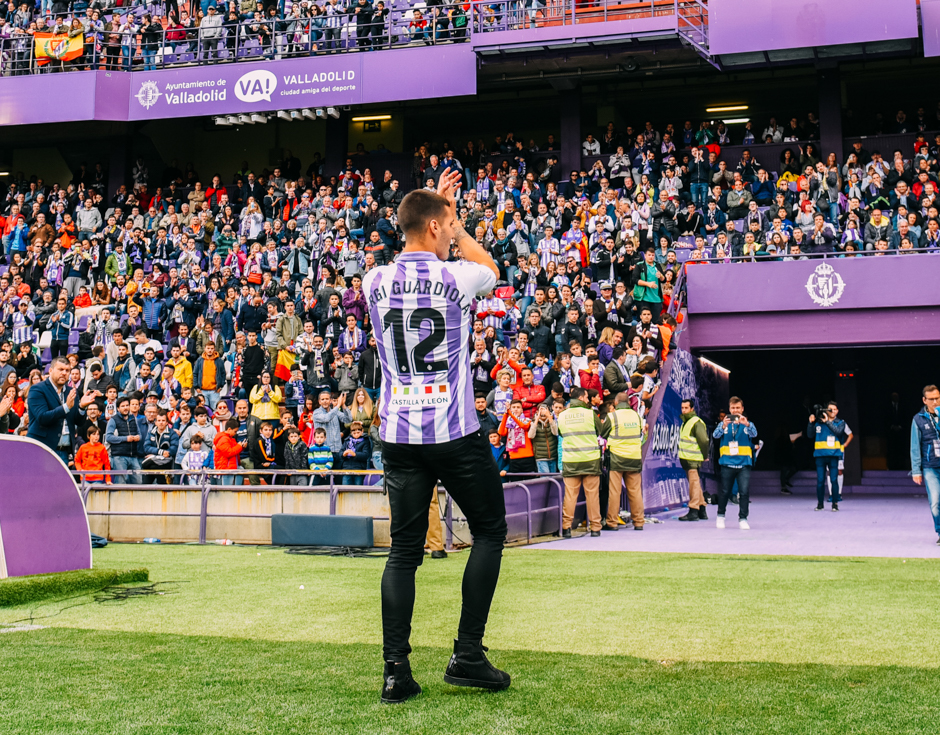
- Guardiola with Valladolid in 2019

Personal information
- Full name: Sergio Guardiola Navarro
- Date of birth: 29 May 1991 (age 35)
- Place of birth: Manacor, Spain
- Height: 1.85 m (6 ft 1 in)
- Position: Forward

Youth career
- Jumilla
- 2009–2010: Lorca Deportiva

Senior career*
Years	Team	Apps	(Gls)
2010	Lorca Deportiva	2	(1)
2010–2012	Jumilla	42	(2)
2012	La Nucía	0	(0)
2012–2013	Ontinyent	17	(1)
2013	Getafe B	7	(0)
2013–2014	Novelda	33	(9)
2014–2015	Eldense	39	(17)
2015	Alcorcón	4	(0)
2015	Barcelona B	0	(0)
2016	Granada B	19	(8)
2016–2017	Granada	0	(0)
2016–2017	→ Adelaide United (loan)	16	(3)
2017	→ Murcia (loan)	18	(10)
2017–2019	Córdoba	40	(22)
2018	→ Getafe (loan)	3	(0)
2019–2023	Valladolid	95	(12)
2021–2022	→ Rayo Vallecano (loan)	32	(8)
2023	→ Cádiz (loan)	17	(3)
2023–2024	Cádiz	22	(1)
2024–2025	Rayo Vallecano	16	(0)
2025–2026	Córdoba	37	(5)
- * Club domestic league appearances and goals as of 6 June 2026

Sergio "Sergi" Guardiola Navarro (born 29 May 1991) is a Spanish professional footballer who plays as a forward.

== Club career ==
=== Early career ===
Born in Manacor, Mallorca, Balearic Islands, Guardiola was a product of Lorca Deportiva CF's youth system, and made his debut as a senior in the 2009–10 season, in Tercera División. In summer 2010, he signed with Segunda División B club Jumilla CF.

In February 2012, Guardiola moved to CF La Nucía in the fourth division. On 1 August, he joined third-tier side Ontinyent CF, moving to Getafe CF B in the same league on 12 January 2013.

=== Eldense and Alcorcón ===
On 12 July 2014, Guardiola signed for CD Eldense after scoring nine goals in the 2013–14 campaign while playing for Novelda CF. On 14 May of the following year, he agreed to a three-year deal with AD Alcorcón, which was made effective on 1 July.

Guardiola made his professional debut on 22 August 2015, coming on as a second-half substitute for Óscar Plano in a 2–0 Segunda División home win against Córdoba CF. On 24 December, after being rarely used, he terminated his contract.

=== Barcelona B and offensive tweets ===
On 28 December 2015, Guardiola signed a one-and-a-half-year deal with FC Barcelona, being assigned to its reserves in division three. However, just hours later, he was released after the discovery of offensive tweets about the club and Catalonia made in 2013. He claimed they were made by a friend as a joke, and that he had not noticed they had been posted.

=== Granada ===
On 8 January 2016, Guardiola joined another reserve side from the same league, Club Recreativo Granada, for the remainder of the campaign. He made his debut later that day, putting his team ahead with a penalty kick in a 1–1 draw at CD San Roque de Lepe.

Guardiola was promoted to Granada CF's first team by new manager Paco Jémez in July 2016, appearing regularly during the pre-season and also being an unused substitute in the opening game of the new season against Villarreal CF. However, after the arrival of new signings, he was deemed surplus to requirements and was loaned to A-League club Adelaide United FC on 13 September 2016.

On 27 January 2017, Guardiola moved to Real Murcia CF also in a temporary deal.

=== Córdoba ===
On 2 July 2017, Guardiola signed a two-year contract with second-division side Córdoba after cutting ties with Granada. On 20 December, he scored a hat-trick in a 5–0 home rout of CF Reus Deportiu.

On 13 March 2018, Guardiola agreed to a four-year extension at the Andalusians, raising his release clause to €15 million. On 22 June, after netting 22 goals and narrowly avoiding relegation, he signed a one-year loan deal with Getafe CF in La Liga.

Guardiola made his debut in the Spanish top flight on 31 August 2018, replacing Ángel late into the 0–0 home draw with Real Valladolid.

=== Valladolid ===
On 25 January 2019, Valladolid reached an agreement with Córdoba for the transfer of Guardiola, who signed a contract until 2023. He scored eight league goals in 35 appearances during the 2019–20 season, his best input in the top tier.

On 31 August 2021, after Valladolid's relegation, Guardiola was loaned to Rayo Vallecano also in the main division. Back to Valladolid for the 2022–23 campaign, with the side back in the top flight, he played 15 goalless matches before leaving.

=== Cádiz ===
On 31 January 2023, Guardiola joined Cádiz CF of the same league on loan, with a conditional obligatory buyout clause. The clause was officially exercised on 1 July, with the player signing a permanent two-year deal.

Guardiola left the club in July 2024, following their relegation.

=== Later career ===
On 4 September 2024, Guardiola returned to Rayo Vallecano on a one-year contract. In June 2025, the 34-year-old rejoined Córdoba on a deal of the same duration.

== Career statistics ==
As of match played 4 June 2023

Appearances and goals by club, season and competition
Club	Season	League			National cup		Other		Total	
Club	Season	Division	Apps	Goals	Apps	Goals	Apps	Goals	Apps	Goals
Lorca Depotiva	2010–11	Segunda División B	2	1	—		—		2	1
Jumilla	2010–11	Segunda División B	26	0	1	0	—		27	0
Ontinyent	2012–13	Segunda División B	17	1	—		—		17	1
Getafe B	2012–13	Segunda División B	7	0	0	0	—		7	0
Eldense	2014–15	Segunda División B	37	14	2	0	2 (Note: Appearances in Segunda División B play-offs)	3	41	17
Alcorcón	2015–16	Segunda División	4	0	1	0	—		5	0
Granada B	2015–16	Segunda División B	19	8	—		—		19	8
Granada	2016–17	La Liga	0	0	0	0	—		0	0
Adelaide United (loan)	2016–17	A-League	16	3	—		—		16	3
Murcia (loan)	2016–17	Segunda División B	14	8	0	0	4	2	18	10
Córdoba	2017–18	Segunda División	40	22	2	2	—		42	24
Getafe (loan)	2018–19	La Liga	3	0	2	0	—		5	0
Valladolid	2018–19	La Liga	17	3	—		—		17	3
Valladolid	2019–20	La Liga	35	8	1	0	—		36	8
Valladolid	2020–21	La Liga	29	1	2	0	—		31	1
Valladolid	2022–23	La Liga	14	0	1	0	—		15	0
Valladolid	Total		95	12	4	0	—		99	12
Rayo Vallecano (loan)	2021–22	La Liga	32	8	6	2	—		38	10
Cádiz (loan)	2022–23	La Liga	17	3	—		—		17	3
Career total			329	80	20	4	6	5	355	89
