= Usson =

Usson may refer to:

== Places ==
Usson is the name or part of the name of several communes in France:

- Usson, Puy-de-Dôme in the Puy-de-Dôme département
- Usson-en-Forez in the Loire département
- Usson-du-Poitou in the Vienne département

== Others ==
- Château d'Usson, a castle in the Ariège département

== See also ==
- Uson (disambiguation)
