= Antonio Sánchez (footballer, born 1997) =

Spanish footballer

Personal information
- Full name: Antonio Sánchez Navarro
- Date of birth: 22 April 1997 (age 29)
- Place of birth: Palma, Spain
- Height: 1.79 m (5 ft 10 in)
- Position: Central midfielder

Team information
- Current team: Mallorca
- Number: 6

Youth career
- Mallorca

Senior career*
Years	Team	Apps	(Gls)
2016–2019	Mallorca B	32	(5)
2016–2017	→ Poblense (loan)	23	(3)
2018–2019	→ Barakaldo (loan)	35	(0)
2019–	Mallorca	195	(8)
2019–2020	→ Mirandés (loan)	34	(2)
- * Club domestic league appearances and goals as of 24 October 2026

Antonio Sánchez Navarro (born 22 April 1997) is a Spanish professional footballer who plays for RCD Mallorca as a central midfielder.

== Career ==
Born in Palma, Majorca, Balearic Islands, Sánchez represented RCD Mallorca as a youth. In August 2016, after finishing his formation, he was loaned to Tercera División side UD Poblense for one year.

Sánchez made his senior debut on 20 August 2016, starting in a 3–1 away win against UD Rotlet Molinar. He scored his first goal on 29 October in a 2–1 win at CF Platges de Calvià, and scored a brace in a 6–2 home routing of Rotlet on 17 December.

Sánchez returned to Mallorca in July 2017, being assigned to the reserves now also in the fourth division. The following 7 March, he renewed his contract until 2020, and joined Segunda División B side Barakaldo CF on loan on 17 July 2018.

On 30 August 2019, Sánchez joined Segunda División side CD Mirandés on a one-year loan deal. He made his professional debut on 8 September, starting in a 2–1 home win against Real Oviedo.

Sánchez scored his first professional goal on 14 December 2019, netting the second in a 2–0 home defeat of SD Huesca. Upon returning to the Bermellones the following August, he became a regular starter and scored three goals in 35 league appearances as the club achieved promotion to La Liga.

Sánchez made his top tier debut on 22 September 2021, replacing Aleix Febas in a 6–1 away loss against Real Madrid. His first goal in the category occurred on 27 October, as he scored the opener in a 1–1 home draw against Sevilla FC.

== Career statistics ==
As of match played 24 October 2026

Appearances and goals by club, season and competition
Club	Season	League			National cup		Other		Total	
Club	Season	Division	Apps	Goals	Apps	Goals	Apps	Goals	Apps	Goals
Mallorca B	2017–18	Tercera División	32	5	—		2 (Note: Appearance(s) in Promotion Playoffs)	1	34	6
Poblense (loan)	2016–17	Tercera División	23	3	—		2	0	25	3
Barakaldo (loan)	2018–19	Segunda División B	35	0	1	0	2	1	38	1
Mallorca	2020–21	Segunda División	35	3	2	0	—		37	3
Mallorca	2021–22	La Liga	29	1	4	0	—		33	1
Mallorca	2022–23	La Liga	32	0	2	0	—		34	0
Mallorca	2023–24	La Liga	29	3	8	0	—		37	0
Mallorca	2024–25	La Liga	33	1	1	0	—		34	1
Mallorca	2025–26	La Liga	29	0	3	0	—		32	0
Mallorca	2026–27	Segunda División	8	0	0	0	—		8	0
Mallorca	Total		195	8	20	0	0	0	215	5
Mirandés (loan)	2019–20	Segunda División	34	2	6	2	—		40	4
Career total			319	18	27	2	6	2	352	22
