= Limones (Maya site) =

Coordinates: 19°01′17″N 88°06′37″W

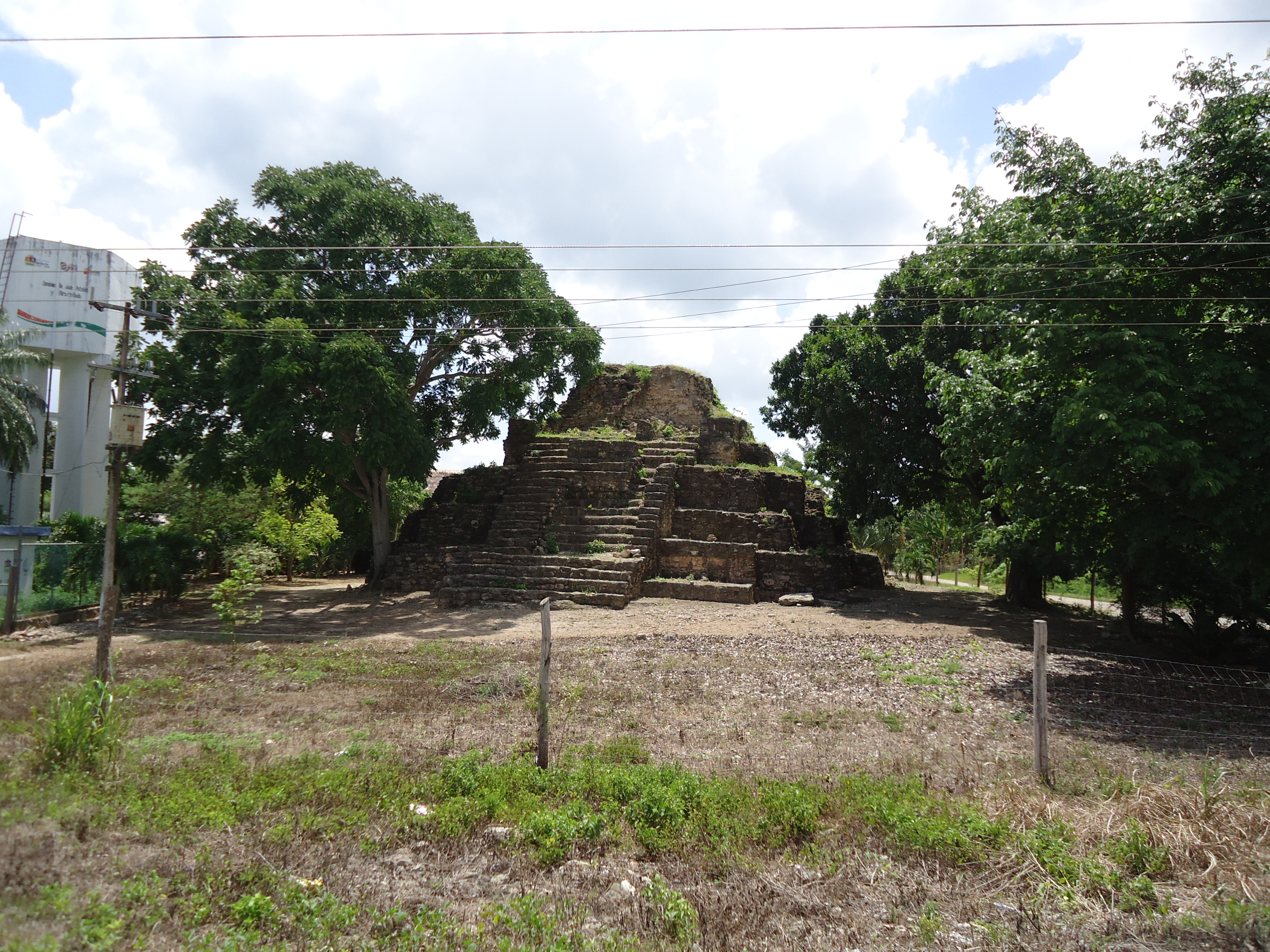
- Pyramid of Limones
- Interactive map of Limones
- Type: Ancient Maya site
- Periods: Classic
- Cultures: Maya civilization
- Location: Mexico
- Region: Quintana Roo

Limones is an archaeological Maya site located inside the modern town of Limones in the Bacalar municipality of Quintana Roo in Mexico. The site main structure is a stepped pyramid dating from the Classic period, the rest of the structures remain buried.

== Location ==
The archaeological site of Limones is located in the community of the same name at the municipality of Bacalar in southern Quintana Roo, Mexico, near the Maya site of Chacchoben. The main pyramid of Limones is visible from the Federal Highway 307 that connects the cities of Cancun and Chetumal.

== Architecture ==
The main pyramid of Limones shows architectural similarities with the structures of Chacchoben like the rounded corners of the buildings, this could indicated that the site was under the influence or domain of Chacchoben. According to archaeological research the pyramid of Limones has an astronomical orientation originally planned to mark the sunsets.
