= Mario García (footballer, born 1999) =

Spanish footballer

Personal information
- Full name: Mario García Sáiz
- Date of birth: 21 March 1999 (age 27)
- Place of birth: Santander, Spain
- Height: 1.78 m (5 ft 10 in)
- Position: Left back

Team information
- Current team: Escobedo

Youth career
- Racing Santander
- Girona

Senior career*
Years	Team	Apps	(Gls)
2018	Girona B	1	(0)
2018–2020	Tropezón	52	(9)
2020–2021	Mirandés B	9	(1)
2020	Mirandés	1	(0)
2021–2022	Tropezón	28	(2)
2022–2024	Escobedo	30	(5)
2025–	Escobedo	10	(0)
- * Club domestic league appearances and goals as of 8 November 2025

Mario García Sáiz (born 21 March 1999) is a Spanish footballer who plays as a left back for Tercera Federación club Escobedo.

== Club career ==
García was born in Santander, Cantabria, and represented Racing de Santander and Girona FC as a youth. He made his senior debut with Girona FC B (which was at the time the C-team) on 27 May 2018, playing the last 15 minutes of a 1–0 Segona Catalana home win against UE Marca de L'Ham.

On 23 July 2018, after finishing his formation, García signed for Tercera División side CD Tropezón. On 7 August 2020, after two seasons as a regular starter, he moved to CD Mirandés and was assigned to the reserves also in the fourth division.

García made his professional debut on 19 September 2020, coming on as a late substitute for Bojan Letić in a 1–1 home draw against Real Oviedo in the Segunda División. On 19 July of the following year, after being sparingly used for the B's, he returned to Tropezón, with the side now in the Segunda División RFEF.
