= Carlos Julio Martínez =

Dominican footballer (born 1994)

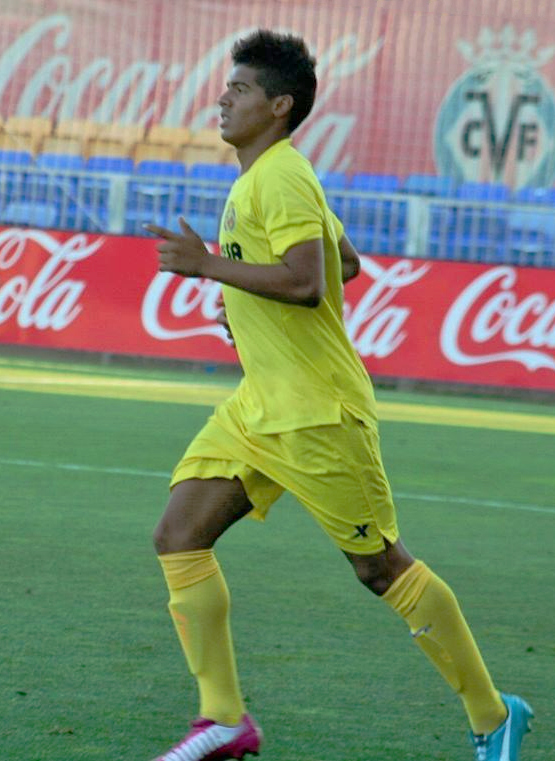
- Martínez with Villarreal C in 2014

Personal information
- Full name: Carlos Julio Martínez Rivas
- Date of birth: 4 February 1994 (age 32)
- Place of birth: Santo Domingo Este, Dominican Republic
- Height: 1.70 m (5 ft 7 in)
- Position: Right-back

Team information
- Current team: Tudelano
- Number: 5

Youth career
- 2010–2013: Barcelona
- 2013: Europa

Senior career*
Years	Team	Apps	(Gls)
2013–2014	Villarreal C	51	(1)
2014–2016	Villarreal B	32	(0)
2016–2018	Marbella	65	(2)
2018–2021	Mirandés	61	(0)
2021–2023	Miedź Legnica	30	(0)
2023	Atlético Baleares	11	(1)
2023–2024	Lugo	22	(0)
2024–2026	Atlético Baleares	33	(0)
2026–	Tudelano	2	(0)

International career^{‡}
2010	Dominican Republic U17	3	(1)
2012–	Dominican Republic	20	(0)
- * Club domestic league appearances and goals as of 7 May 2026 ‡ National team caps and goals as of 14 June 2022

Carlos Julio Martínez Rivas (born 4 February 1994), known as Carlos Julio in Spain, is a Dominican professional footballer who plays for Spanish club Tudelano and the Dominican Republic national team. Mainly a right-back, he can also play as a midfielder.

== Club career ==
Born in Santo Domingo Este, Carlos Julio emigrated to Barcelona in 2000 and was in FC Barcelona's La Masia academy until 2013, when he signed for Villarreal CF. He represented their third and reserve teams in Tercera División and Segunda División B respectively, before on 9 July 2016 signing a two-year deal with Marbella FC of the latter.

On 9 July 2018, Carlos Julio joined fellow third division side CD Mirandés. On 18 July of the following year, after achieving promotion to Segunda División, he renewed his contract for a further campaign.

On 14 August 2021, Carlos Julio joined Polish I liga side Miedź Legnica on a one-year deal. On 30 January 2023, he left the club after amicably terminating his contract.

In September 2024, Carlos Julio returned to Atlético Baleares.

== International career ==
Carlos Julio also holds Spanish citizenship, and represented Dominican Republic at the 2012 Caribbean Cup.

== Honours ==
Miedź Legnica

- I liga: 2021–22
