= Antonio Caballero (footballer) =

Spanish footballer (born 1994)

Personal information
- Full name: Antonio Jesús Caballero Ramírez
- Date of birth: 6 January 1994 (age 32)
- Place of birth: Martos, Spain
- Height: 1.75 m (5 ft 9 in)
- Position: Midfielder

Team information
- Current team: Jaén
- Number: 8

Youth career
- Jaén
- Martos
- 2012–2013: Séneca

Senior career*
Years	Team	Apps	(Gls)
2013–2014	Martos	32	(0)
2014	Lucena	7	(0)
2014–2015	Martos	4	(0)
2015	Ciudad Torredonjimeno	12	(0)
2015–2016	Mancha Real	17	(4)
2016–2017	Elche B	48	(4)
2017	Elche	3	(0)
2017–2018	Rápido Bouzas	37	(2)
2018–2019	Castellón	34	(2)
2019–2020	Badajoz	26	(2)
2020–2021	Mirandés	22	(0)
2021–2022	UCAM Murcia	15	(0)
2022–2023	San Fernando	31	(0)
2023	Córdoba	17	(0)
2023–2024	Cornellà	37	(2)
2024–2025	UD Logroñés	27	(2)
2025–	Jaén	29	(1)
- * Club domestic league appearances and goals as of 7 May 2026

Antonio Jesús Caballero Ramírez (Spanish pronunciation: [anˈtonjo kaβaˈʎeɾo]; born 6 January 1994) is a Spanish footballer who plays for Segunda Federación club Jaén as a midfielder.

== Club career ==
Born in Martos, Jaén, Andalusia, Caballero made his senior debut with Martos CD in the 2013–14 season, in Tercera División. On 3 July 2014 he moved to Segunda División B side Real Balompédica Linense, but on 28 August he joined fellow league team Lucena CF after cutting ties with the former.

After being rarely used, Caballero left Lucena and returned to Martos on 28 December 2014. The following 7 February, however, he signed for UD Ciudad de Torredonjimeno, both in the fourth division. On 25 June 2015, he agreed to a contract with Atlético Mancha Real.

On 20 January 2016 Caballero joined Elche CF, being assigned to the reserves still in the fourth tier. On 15 April of the following year he made his first team debut, coming on as a second-half substitute for Armando in a 1–3 Segunda División home loss against CD Numancia.

Caballero left the Franjiverdes in July 2017, and subsequently represented third division sides Rápido de Bouzas, CD Castellón and CD Badajoz, reaching the play-offs with the latter. On 21 August 2020, he agreed to a deal with CD Mirandés in the second tier.

On 26 July 2021, free agent Caballero agreed to a contract with Primera División RFEF side UCAM Murcia CF.

== Personal life ==
Caballero's younger brother Raúl is also a footballer. A forward, he played for Córdoba CF and UD Almería as a youth.
