= Marc Fernández =

Spanish basketball player

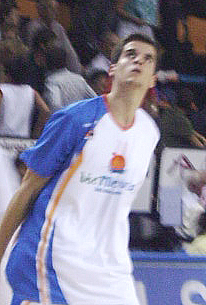

Personal information
- Born: July 23, 1987 (age 39) El Masnou
- Listed height: 6 ft 8 in (2.03 m)
- Listed weight: 145 lb (66 kg)

Career information
- Playing career: 2007–2012
- Position: Small forward

Career history
- 2005–2007: CB Cornellà
- 2007–2010: ViveMenorca
- 2010–2011: Valencia BC
- 2011–2012: Girona FC
Medals
Men's basketball
Representing Spain
FIBA Europe Under-18 Championship
Gold medal – first place	2004 Spain	Team

Marc Fernández Usón (born July 23, 1987, in El Masnou, Catalonia) is a Spanish former basketball player, playing the small forward position. He played for Valencia BC in Liga ACB.
