= Alberto González (footballer, born 1996) =

Spanish footballer

Personal information
- Full name: Alberto González Cespedosa
- Date of birth: 23 July 1996 (age 30)
- Place of birth: Córdoba, Spain
- Height: 1.90 m (6 ft 3 in)
- Position: Goalkeeper

Team information
- Current team: Marchamalo

Youth career
- Apademar
- 2010–2014: Don Bosco
- 2014–2015: Figueroa

Senior career*
Years	Team	Apps	(Gls)
2015–2017	Ciudad Lucena	45	(0)
2017–2019	Córdoba B	28	(0)
2018	Córdoba	1	(0)
2019–2021	Mirandés B	36	(0)
2021–2023	Almazán	60	(0)
2023–2024	Palencia	33	(0)
2024–2025	Villarrobledo	18	(0)
2025	Málaga City	6	(0)
2025–	Marchamalo	10	(0)
- * Club domestic league appearances and goals as of 8 November 2025

Álberto González Cespedosa (born 23 July 1996) is a Spanish footballer who plays for Tercera Federación club Marchamalo as a goalkeeper.

== Club career ==
Born in Córdoba, Andalusia, González finished his formation with Club Figueroa. In 2015, he moved to CD Ciudad de Lucena in the regional leagues; initially a backup to Miguel Díaz, he made his senior debut on 13 December of that year, starting in a 1–2 Primera Andaluza home loss against CD Pozoblanco.

González renewed his contract with the club ahead of the 2016–17 season, being a first-choice option and achieving promotion to Tercera División. On 20 June 2017, he signed for Córdoba CF and was assigned to the reserves in Segunda División B.

In August 2018, after the departures of Igor Stefanović and Paweł Kieszek, González was promoted to the first-team as a third-choice behind Carlos Abad and Marcos Lavín. On 22 September, as Carlos was ruled out due to his loan contract and Lavín was injured, he made his professional debut by starting in a 1–1 home draw against CD Tenerife in the Segunda División championship.

On 6 August 2019, González signed for CD Mirandés, newly promoted to the second division. After appearing exclusively for the B-team, he moved to Tercera División RFEF side SD Almazán on 22 July 2021.
