= Limones (footballer) =

Spanish footballer

Personal information
- Full name: Jesús Reguillos Moya
- Date of birth: 17 October 1986 (age 40)
- Place of birth: Daimiel, Spain
- Height: 1.92 m (6 ft 4 in)
- Position: Goalkeeper

Youth career
- Daimiel
- Elche

Senior career*
Years	Team	Apps	(Gls)
2005–2008	Elche B		
2008–2009	Dénia	5	(0)
2009–2010	Estoril	0	(0)
2010	Oviedo B	12	(0)
2010–2011	Jumilla	14	(0)
2011	Ceuta	2	(0)
2011–2012	Puertollano	20	(0)
2012–2013	Lucena	36	(0)
2013–2018	Cartagena	142	(0)
2018–2021	Mirandés	115	(0)
2021–2022	Badajoz	13	(0)
2022–2023	Calahorra	20	(0)
2023–2024	Ciudad Lucena	4	(0)
- * Club domestic league appearances and goals as of 16:02, 23 September 2024 (UTC)

Jesús Reguillos Moya (born 17 October 1986), known as Limones, is a Spanish professional footballer who plays as a goalkeeper.

== Club career ==
Limones was born in Daimiel, Ciudad Real, Castilla–La Mancha, and was an Elche CF youth graduate. In 2008, after spending several seasons with the reserves in the Tercera División, he joined Segunda División B side CD Dénia.

In July 2009, Limones moved abroad and signed with Portuguese club G.D. Estoril Praia. The following 26 January, after making no appearances, he returned to his home country with Real Oviedo, being assigned to the B team in the fourth division.

Limones competed in the third tier the following eight years, representing Jumilla CF, AD Ceuta, CD Puertollano, Lucena CF, FC Cartagena and CD Mirandés and achieving promotion to Segunda División with the latter club at the end of the 2018–19 season. On 8 July 2019, he agreed to a new one-year contract.

Limones made his professional debut on 17 August 2019 at the age of 32, in a 2–2 away draw against Rayo Vallecano. A regular starter initially, he lost his status to Raúl Lizoain in the 2020–21 campaign, and signed with CD Badajoz of the Primera División RFEF on 20 July 2021.
