= 2019–20 Copa del Rey =

Tournament details
- Country: Spain
- Date: 13 November 2019 – 3 April 2021
- Teams: 125

Final positions
- Champions: Real Sociedad (2nd title)
- Runners-up: Athletic Bilbao

Tournament statistics
- Matches played: 126
- Goals scored: 351 (2.79 per match)
- Top goal scorer(s): Alexander Isak (7 goals)

The 2019–20 Copa del Rey was the 118th staging of the Copa del Rey (including two seasons where two rival editions were played). In its original format, the winners were assured a place in the 2020–21 UEFA Europa League group stage, however this place was forfeited under the extraordinary circumstances of the COVID-19 pandemic in Spain, with the two finalists (Athletic Bilbao and Real Sociedad) opting instead to delay the date of the postponed match. Both finalists qualified for the four-team 2021 Supercopa de España.

The defending champions Valencia were eliminated by Granada in the quarter-finals. Real Sociedad won the final 1–0 against Basque rivals Athletic Bilbao, achieving their second Copa del Rey title (in 1909 it was won by its forerunner, Club Ciclista de San Sebastián), ending a 34-year trophy drought since 1987.

As across Spain, match times up to 26 October 2019 and from 29 March 2020 were CEST (UTC+2). Times on interim ("winter") days were CET (UTC+1).

== Schedule and format ==
On 29 April 2019, the assembly of the Royal Spanish Football Federation approved the new competition format, expanding the competition to 125 teams and changing all rounds to a single-match format until the semi-finals.

Video assistant referee was used from the round of 16.

The RFEF confirmed the dates on 31 July 2019.

Round	Draw date	Date	Fixtures	Clubs	Format details
Preliminary	17 October 2019	13 November 2019	10	121 → 111	New entries: Clubs qualified through the 2018–19 fifth tier. Opponents seeding: Teams faced each other according to proximity criteria. Local team seeding: Luck of the draw. Knock-out tournament type: Single match
First round	17 November 2019	18 December 2019	55	111 → 56	New entries: All qualified teams except the four participants in the Supercopa de España. Opponents seeding: Teams from La Liga faced teams from the lowest divisions. The four remaining teams faced teams from Segunda División B. One team received a bye. Local team seeding: Match played at home of team in lower division. Knock-out tournament type: Single match.
Second round	20 December 2019	12 January 2020	28	56 → 28	Opponents seeding: Teams from lowest divisions faced La Liga teams. Local team seeding: Match played at home of team in lower division. Knock-out tournament type: Single match
Round of 32	14 January 2020	22 January 2020	16	32 → 16	New entries: Clubs participating in Supercopa de España gained entry. Opponents seeding: Teams from lowest divisions faced La Liga teams. Local team seeding: Match played at home of team in lower division. Knock-out tournament type: Single match.
Round of 16	24 January 2020	29 January 2020	8	16 → 8	Opponents seeding: Teams from lowest divisions faced La Liga teams. Local team seeding: Match played at home of team in lower division. Knock-out tournament type: Single match.
Quarter-finals	31 January 2020	5 February 2020	4	8 → 4	Opponents seeding: Luck of the draw. Local team seeding: Match played at home of team in lower division. Knock-out tournament type: Single match.
Semi-finals	7 February 2020	12 February 2020	2	4 → 2	Opponents seeding: Luck of the draw. Local team seeding: Luck of the draw. Knock-out tournament type: Double match.
Semi-finals	7 February 2020	4 March 2020	2	4 → 2	Opponents seeding: Luck of the draw. Local team seeding: Luck of the draw. Knock-out tournament type: Double match.
Final		~~18 April 2020~~; 3 April 2021	1	2 → 1	Single match at Estadio de La Cartuja, Seville. Both teams qualified for the 2021 Supercopa de España.

Notes

- Double-match rounds enforced away goals rule.
- Games ending in a tie were decided in extra time, and if still level, by a penalty shoot-out.
- Due to the COVID-19 pandemic in Spain, the final was postponed; the participants (Athletic Bilbao and Real Sociedad) agreed to delay the event until such a time as supporters were permitted to be present, but this meant the deadline for UEFA registration would be missed; therefore the UEFA Europa League place normally on offer passed over to La Liga.

== Qualified teams ==
The following teams qualified for the competition. Reserve teams were excluded.

La Liga the 20 teams of the 2018–19 season	Segunda División the 21 teams of the 2018–19 season (Note: Reus was excluded from the competition.)	Segunda División B the top seven non-reserve teams of each group of the 2018–19 season	Tercera División the best non-reserve team of each one of the eighteen groups of the 2018–19 season and the best fourteen runners-up, excluding reserve teams	Copa Federación the four semi-finalists of the 2019 season	Regional leagues The winners of the twenty groups of the fifth tier in the 2018–19 season
Alavés; Athletic Bilbao; Atlético Madrid (Note: Atlético Madrid, Barcelona, Real Madrid and Valencia joined the tournament in the round of 32, as participants in the Supercopa de España.); Barcelona; Celta Vigo; Eibar; Espanyol; Getafe; Girona; Huesca; Leganés; Levante; Rayo Vallecano; Real Betis; Real Madrid; Real Sociedad; Sevilla; Valencia^{TH}; Valladolid; Villarreal	Albacete; Alcorcón; Almería; Cádiz; Córdoba; Deportivo La Coruña; Elche; Extremadura; Gimnàstic; Granada; Las Palmas; Lugo; Málaga; Mallorca; Numancia; Osasuna; Oviedo; Rayo Majadahonda; Sporting Gijón; Tenerife; Zaragoza	Amorebieta; Atlético Baleares; Badalona; Badajoz; Barakaldo; Cartagena; Cornellà; Cultural Leonesa; Ebro; Fuenlabrada; Guijuelo; Hércules; Ibiza; Langreo; Leioa; Lleida Esportiu; Marbella; Melilla; Mirandés; Olot; Ponferradina; Pontevedra; Racing Santander; Recreativo; San Sebastián de los Reyes; UCAM Murcia; UD Logroñés; Unionistas	Bergantiños; Cacereño; Ceuta; Escobedo; Gimnástica Segoviana; Haro; Illueca; Jaén; L'Hospitalet; La Nucia; Laredo; Las Rozas; Lealtad; Linares; Llagostera; Lorca Deportiva; Marino Luanco; Mensajero; Mérida; Orihuela; Peña Deportiva; Peña Sport; Portugalete; Racing Ferrol; SD Logroñés; Sestao River; Socuéllamos; Tamaraceite; Tarazona; Villarrubia; Yeclano; Zamora	Castellón; Coruxo; Murcia; Tudelano	Andorra; Andratx; Atlético Antoniano; Atlético Porcuna; Barquereño; Becerril; Comillas; El Álamo; El Palmar; Fraga; Gran Tarajal; Intercity; Lobón; Melilla CD; Pedroñeras; Peña Azagresa; Pontellas; Ramón y Cajal; Tolosa; Urraca

== Preliminary round ==
=== Draw ===
Teams were divided into four groups according to geographical criteria.

Group 1	Group 2	Group 3	Group 4
Barquereño; Becerril; Comillas; Pontellas; Tolosa; Urraca	Andorra; Andratx; Fraga; Peña Azagresa	Atlético Antoniano; Atlético Porcuna; El Palmar; Lobón; Melilla CD; Ramón y Cajal	El Álamo; Gran Tarajal; Intercity; Pedroñeras

=== Matches ===
13 November 2019	Tolosa (4)	1–0	Pontellas (4)	Tolosa
19:00 CET	Elorza 62'	Report		Stadium: Berazubi; Referee: Pastor Fernández

13 November 2019	Becerril (4)	1–0	Urraca (4)	Becerril de Campos
19:00 CET	Melero 30'	Report		Stadium: Mariano Haro; Attendance: 1,500; Referee: Pereira Ferreiro

13 November 2019	Andorra (3)	3–0	Andratx (4)	Encamp
19:00 CET	Álex Pachón 3'; Ruben Bover 28'; Vilanova 81'	Report		Stadium: Prada de Moles; Attendance: 500; Referee: De Ena Wof

13 November 2019	Comillas (4)	1–1 (a.e.t.) (3–2 p)	Barquereño (4)	Logroño
20:00 CET	Jadraque 5'	Report	Iñaki 27'	Stadium: Mundial 82; Referee: Pérez García
	Penalties
	Muñiz (penalty scored); Rubio (penalty missed); Adrián (penalty scored); Alberto (penalty scored); Edu (penalty missed)		(penalty missed) Borti; (penalty scored) Raúl; (penalty scored) Lucho; (penalty missed) Chiki; (penalty missed) Crístofer

13 November 2019	Fraga (4)	0–1	Peña Azagresa (4)	Fraga
20:30 CET		Report	Murugarren 70'	Stadium: La Estacada; Attendance: 1,500; Referee: Masip Vidal

13 November 2019	Melilla CD (4)	1–0 (a.e.t.)	Lobón (5)	Melilla
20:30 CET	David Vázquez 100'	Report		Stadium: La Espiguera; Attendance: 1,000; Referee: Durán García

13 November 2019	Atlético Antoniano (4)	2–0	Atlético Porcuna (4)	Lebrija
21:00 CET	Alberto 12'; Pepelu 24'	Report		Stadium: Municipal; Attendance: 2,000; Referee: Morales Véliz

13 November 2019	Ramón y Cajal (5)	1–2	El Palmar (4)	Ceuta
21:00 CET	Darío 50'	Report	Saborido 7'; Salinas 29' (pen.)	Stadium: Alfonso Murube; Attendance: 1,500; Referee: Vaca Núñez

13 November 2019	El Álamo (4)	2–1	Pedroñeras (4)	El Álamo
21:00 CET	Matas 37'; Flores 77'	Report	Espinosa 17' (pen.)	Stadium: Facundo Rivas; Attendance: 2,000; Referee: Sánchez Inguidua

13 November 2019	Intercity (4)	3–0	Gran Tarajal (4)	Sant Joan d'Alacant
21:00 CET	Jordan 10'; David Torres 27', 63'	Report		Stadium: Poliesportiu Municipal; Attendance: 2,000; Referee: Ibáñez Juárez

== First round ==
The first round was played by all the qualified teams, except the four participants in the 2020 Supercopa de España, paired by a draw where the ten winners from the previous preliminary round were paired with ten teams from the La Liga. The remaining six teams and the 22 teams of Segunda were paired with the four Copa Federación semifinalists, the 21 that compete in Tercera and three from Segunda B. Finally, the remaining 35 teams from Segunda B were paired between them, one team received a bye in this round. In the case of rivals of the same category, the home advantage was decided by the order of extraction of the balls and otherwise, it was in the stadium of the lower category team. A total of 55 games were played, with 111 participating teams, from December 17 to 19, 2019.

=== Draw ===
Teams were divided into five pots according to their division in the 2019–20 season, except Andorra, included in the pot 1 as participant of the preliminary round.

Pot 1; 10 winners of the preliminary round	Pot 2; 16 teams of La Liga	Pot 3; 21 teams of Tercera División and 4 teams qualified through the Copa Federación	Pot 4; 22 teams of Segunda División	Pot 5; 38 teams of Segunda División B
Andorra; Atlético Antoniano; Becerril; Comillas; El Álamo; El Palmar; Intercity; Melilla CD; Peña Azagresa; Tolosa	Alavés; Athletic Bilbao; Celta Vigo; Eibar; Espanyol; Getafe; Granada; Leganés; Levante; Mallorca; Osasuna; Real Betis; Real Sociedad; Sevilla; Valladolid; Villarreal	Bergantiños; Cacereño; Castellón; Ceuta; Coruxo; Escobedo; Gimnástica Segoviana; Illueca; Jaén; L'Hospitalet; Laredo; Lealtad; Linares; Lorca Deportiva; Mensajero; Murcia; Peña Sport; Portugalete; SD Logroñés; Sestao River; Socuéllamos; Tamaraceite; Tarazona; Tudelano; Zamora	Albacete; Alcorcón; Almería; Cádiz; Deportivo La Coruña; Elche; Extremadura; Fuenlabrada; Girona; Huesca; Las Palmas; Lugo; Málaga; Mirandés; Numancia; Ponferradina; Racing Santander; Rayo Vallecano; Oviedo; Sporting Gijón; Tenerife; Zaragoza	Amorebieta; Atlético Baleares; Badajoz; Badalona; Barakaldo; Cartagena; Córdoba; Cornellà; Cultural Leonesa; Ebro; Gimnàstic; Guijuelo; Haro; Hércules; Ibiza; La Nucía; Langreo; Las Rozas; Leioa; Llagostera; Lleida Esportiu; Marbella; Marino Luanco; Melilla; Mérida; Olot; Orihuela; Peña Deportiva; Pontevedra; Racing Ferrol; Rayo Majadahonda; Recreativo; San Sebastián de los Reyes; UCAM Murcia; UD Logroñés; Unionistas; Villarrubia; Yeclano

=== Matches ===
Yeclano received a bye in this round.

11 December 2019	UD Logroñés (3)	2–1	Marino Luanco (3)	Logroño
19:00	Andy 44'; Iñaki 67'	Report	Mika 90'	Stadium: Las Gaunas; Attendance: 2,734; Referee: Pol Gòdia Solé

17 December 2019	Lealtad (4)	0–1	Cádiz (2)	Villaviciosa
15:30		Report	Querol 75'	Stadium: Les Caleyes; Attendance: 900; Referee: Javier Iglesias Villanueva

17 December 2019	Coruxo (3)	4–5 (a.e.t.)	Mirandés (2)	Vigo
16:00	Al Watani 6'; Silva 20' (pen.); Añón 68', 71' (pen.)	Report	Matheus 7'; Vicente 18'; S. González 53'; Álvaro Rey 90+2' (pen.); Merquelanz 119'	Stadium: O Vao; Attendance: 1,500; Referee: José Antonio López Toca

17 December 2019	Jaén (4)	3–1	Alavés (1)	Jaén
19:00	Ocaña 14'; Martín 84'; Hernández 90'	Report	Pons 86'	Stadium: La Victoria; Attendance: 4,000; Referee: José María Sánchez Martínez

17 December 2019	SD Logroñés (4)	0–5	Eibar (1)	Logroño (Note: Comillas and SD Logroñés played their game at Las Gaunas instead of their regular stadium Mundial 82, also in Logroño, after mutual agreement between both clubs and official approval from the Royal Spanish Football Federation.)
19:00		Report	De Blasis 57', 62', 70'; Charles 83', 87'	Stadium: Las Gaunas; Attendance: 2,500; Referee: Xavier Estrada Fernández

17 December 2019	L'Hospitalet (4)	2–3 (a.e.t.)	Granada (1)	L'Hospitalet de Llobregat
19:00	Ripoll 12'; Martínez 44'	Report	Ramos 52' (pen.), 96'; Soldado 79'	Stadium: La Feixa Llarga; Attendance: 2,000; Referee: Guillermo Cuadra Fernández

17 December 2019	Illueca (4)	0–2	Deportivo La Coruña (2)	Illueca
19:00		Report	Longo 85' (pen.); Koné 86'	Stadium: Papa Luna; Attendance: 2,000; Referee: Gorka Sagués Oscoz

17 December 2019	Langreo (3)	2–3	Ebro (3)	Langreo
19:30	Cristian 61'; Palomares 67' (o.g.)	Report	Rubio 15' (pen.); García 82'; Emaná 86'	Stadium: Ganzábal; Attendance: 712; Referee: Gonzalo Sáiz Pérez

17 December 2019	Marbella (3)	2–1	Guijuelo (3)	Marbella
19:30	D. Pérez 54'; E. Pérez 89'	Report	Muñoz 30'	Stadium: Municipal; Attendance: 4,000; Referee: Antonio Sánchez Sánchez

17 December 2019	Castellón (3)	0–2	Las Palmas (2)	Castellón de la Plana
20:00		Report	J. Fernández 72'; Maikel 75'	Stadium: Castalia; Attendance: 9,700; Referee: Rubén Ávalos Barrera

17 December 2019	Cacereño (4)	1–0	Alcorcón (2)	Cáceres
20:00	Gustavo 50'	Report		Stadium: Príncipe Felipe; Attendance: 2,362; Referee: Oliver De La Fuente Ramos

17 December 2019	Socuéllamos (4)	0–1	Zaragoza (2)	Socuéllamos
20:00		Report	Papunashvili 35'	Stadium: Paquito Jiménez; Attendance: 2,500; Referee: Jorge Figueroa Vázquez

17 December 2019	Portugalete (4)	1–0	Extremadura (2)	Portugalete
20:00	Güemes 68'	Report		Stadium: La Florida; Attendance: 2,700; Referee: Juan Luis Pulido Santana

17 December 2019	Peña Sport (4)	0–1 (a.e.t.)	Fuenlabrada (2)	Tafalla
20:00		Report	Héctor 119'	Stadium: San Francisco; Attendance: 800; Referee: Iñaki Bikandi Garrido

17 December 2019	Tarazona (4)	0–1 (a.e.t.)	Rayo Vallecano (2)	Tarazona
20:15		Report	Óscar 120+2'	Stadium: Municipal; Attendance: 2,200; Referee: Iosu Galech Apezteguía

17 December 2019	Gimnástica Segoviana (4)	0–2	Elche (2)	Segovia
20:30		Report	Mourad 34'; Milla 81' (pen.)	Stadium: La Albuera; Attendance: 1,816; Referee: Isidro Díaz de Mera Escuderos

17 December 2019	Zamora (4)	2–1	Sporting Gijón (2)	Zamora
20:30	García 36' (pen.), 83'	Report	Cerro 89'	Stadium: Ruta de la Plata; Attendance: 1,400; Referee: Alejandro Muñíz Ruiz

17 December 2019	Escobedo (4)	2–0	Málaga (2)	Camargo
20:30	Ramiro 52'; Dalisson 84'	Report		Stadium: Eusebio Arce; Attendance: 1,800; Referee: Jon Ander González Esteban

17 December 2019	Unionistas (3)	1–0	Atlético Baleares (3)	Villares de la Reina
20:30	Navas 19'	Report		Stadium: Pistas del Helmántico; Attendance: 1,873; Referee: Pablo Fernández Pérez

17 December 2019	Hércules (3)	0–1	Recreativo (3)	Alicante
20:45		Report	D. Jiménez 31'	Stadium: José Rico Pérez; Attendance: 1,000; Referee: Álvaro Varón Aceitón

17 December 2019	Intercity (4)	0–3	Athletic Bilbao (1)	Elche (Note: Intercity played its game at Martínez Valero instead of their regular stadium Poliesportiu, in Sant Joan d'Alacant, as it does not meet the requirements established by the Royal Spanish Football Federation.)
21:00		Report	Ibai 1'; Beñat 53'; Kodro 87' (pen.)	Stadium: Martínez Valero; Attendance: 4,971; Referee: Carlos del Cerro Grande

17 December 2019	Andorra (3)	1–1 (a.e.t.) (5–6 p)	Leganés (1)	Encamp
21:00	Keita 25'	Report	Carrillo 63'	Stadium: Prada de Moles; Attendance: 600; Referee: Santiago Jaime Latre
	Penalties
	Palanca (penalty scored); Goujón (penalty missed); Loureiro (penalty scored); Casadesús (penalty scored); Sidibé (penalty missed); Rai (penalty scored); Keita (penalty scored); Dot (penalty missed)		(penalty missed) Carrillo; (penalty scored) Varela; (penalty missed) Ruibal; (penalty scored) Mourid; (penalty scored) Plomer; (penalty scored) Avilés; (penalty scored) Tarín; (penalty scored) Awaziem

17 December 2019	Ceuta (4)	1–1 (a.e.t.) (3–2 p)	Numancia (2)	Ceuta
21:00	Polaco 76'	Report	Néstor 47'	Stadium: Alfonso Murube; Attendance: 1,500; Referee: Luis Mario Milla Alvéndiz
	Penalties
	Ramírez (penalty scored); Sánchez (penalty scored); Ismael (penalty missed); Castro (penalty scored)		(penalty scored) Guillermo; (penalty scored) Mateu; (penalty missed) Sola; (penalty missed) Gus Ledes; (penalty missed) Néstor

17 December 2019	Murcia (3)	1–0	Racing Santander (2)	Murcia
21:00	Juanma 7'	Report		Stadium: Enrique Roca; Attendance: 4,874; Referee: Santiago Varón Aceitón

17 December 2019	Cartagena (3)	4–1	Leioa (3)	Cartagena
21:00	Jovanović 14', 28'; Araújo 34'; Forniés 56'	Report	Yurrebaso 89'	Stadium: Cartagonova; Attendance: 4,000; Referee: Luis Collado López

17 December 2019	Mensajero (4)	0–3	Tenerife (2)	Santa Cruz de La Palma (Note: Mensajero played at Rosendo Hernández instead of their regular stadium Silvestre Carrillo, also in Santa Cruz de La Palma as this one does not have floodlights.)
21:30		Report	Padilla 6'; Naranjo 37', 83'	Stadium: Rosendo Hernández; Attendance: 1,090; Referee: Miguel Ángel Ortiz Arias

18 December 2019	San Sebastián de los Reyes (3)	2–0	Córdoba (3)	San Sebastián de los Reyes
17:30	Julio 41'; Ruiz 69'	Report		Stadium: Matapiñonera; Attendance: 400; Referee: David Jesús Pinto Herrera

18 December 2019	El Palmar (4)	1–2	Getafe (1)	Murcia (Note: El Palmar played its game at Nueva Condomina instead of their regular stadium Municipal, in El Palmar, after mutual agreement between both clubs and official approval from the Royal Spanish Football Federation.)
18:00	Etxeita 25' (o.g.)	Report	Ángel 63'; Molina 70' (pen.)	Stadium: Nueva Condomina; Attendance: 3,000; Referee: José Luis Munuera Montero

18 December 2019	Comillas (4)	0–5	Villarreal (1)	Logroño
18:00		Report	Suárez 31'; Bacca 34', 75', 84'; Cazorla 77'	Stadium: Las Gaunas; Attendance: 4,000; Referee: Eduardo Prieto Iglesias

18 December 2019	Tolosa (4)	0–3	Valladolid (1)	Tolosa
18:00		Report	Ünal 21'; Aguado 57', 65'	Stadium: Berazubi; Attendance: 2,000; Referee: Adrián Cordero Vega

18 December 2019	El Álamo (4)	0–1	Mallorca (1)	El Álamo
18:00		Report	Alegría 90+3'	Stadium: Facundo Rivas; Attendance: 2,200; Referee: David Medié Jiménez

18 December 2019	Tudelano (3)	0–1	Albacete (2)	Tudela
18:00		Report	Ojeda 40'	Stadium: Ciudad de Tudela; Attendance: 2,000; Referee: Daniel Ocón Arráiz

18 December 2019	Bergantiños (4)	0–1	Sevilla (1)	A Coruña (Note: Bergantiños played at Riazor instead of their regular stadium As Eiroas, in Carballo, as it does not meet the requirements established by the Royal Spanish Football Federation.)
18:00		Report	Koundé 16'	Stadium: Riazor; Attendance: 3,677; Referee: Pablo González Fuertes

18 December 2019	Badalona (3)	3–1	Oviedo (2)	Badalona
18:00	Esteban 21'; Cris Montes 55', 69'	Report	Ibrahima 52'	Stadium: Municipal; Attendance: 635; Referee: Daniel Jesús Trujillo Suárez

18 December 2019	Melilla (3)	1–2	UCAM Murcia (3)	Melilla
18:00	Mawi 60'	Report	Barbosa 3'; Justo 40'	Stadium: Álvarez Claro; Attendance: 500; Referee: Alejandro Ruiz Aguilera

18 December 2019	Sestao River (4)	1–1 (a.e.t.) (6–5 p)	Lugo (2)	Sestao
20:00	Leandro 37'	Report	Herrera 90+2'	Stadium: Las Llanas; Attendance: 3,000; Referee: Víctor Areces Franco
	Penalties
	Gago (penalty scored); Martín (penalty scored); Zumalacárregui (penalty scored); Huidobro (penalty scored); Villar (penalty scored); Alonso (penalty scored)		(penalty scored) Barreiro; (penalty scored) Herrera; (penalty scored) Morais; (penalty scored) López; (penalty scored) José Carlos; (penalty missed) Lebedenko

18 December 2019	Barakaldo (3)	0–0 (a.e.t.) (5–3 p)	Villarrubia (3)	Barakaldo
20:15		Report		Stadium: Lasesarre; Attendance: 800; Referee: Miguel Sesma Espinosa
	Penalties
	Galán (penalty scored); Héctor (penalty scored); Adrián (penalty scored); López (penalty scored); Olaizola (penalty scored)		(penalty missed) Copete; (penalty scored) Grillo; (penalty scored) Díaz; (penalty scored) Jiménez

19 December 2019	Melilla CD (4)	0–5	Levante (1)	Melilla (Note: Melilla CD played at Álvarez Claro instead of their regular stadium La Espiguera, also in Melilla, after mutual agreement between both clubs and official approval from the Royal Spanish Football Federation.)
19:00		Report	Coke 9', 12'; Mayoral 20'; Hernâni 55'; Sergio León 84'	Stadium: Álvarez Claro; Attendance: 3,000; Referee: Javier Alberola Rojas

19 December 2019	Peña Azagresa (4)	0–2	Celta Vigo (1)	Calahorra (Note: Peña Azagresa played its game at La Planilla instead of their regular stadium Miguel Sola, in Azagra, as it does not meet the requirements established by the Royal Spanish Football Federation.)
19:00		Report	Hernández 45+1', 69'	Stadium: La Planilla; Attendance: 4,000; Referee: César Soto Grado

19 December 2019	Atlético Antoniano (4)	0–4	Real Betis (1)	Seville (Note: Atlético Antoniano played at Benito Villamarín, stadium of Real Betis, instead of their regular stadium Municipal, in Lebrija, after mutual agreement between both clubs and official approval from the Royal Spanish Football Federation.)
19:00		Report	Tello 14' (pen.); Kaptoum 25'; Lainez 52'; Meléndez 80'	Stadium: Benito Villamarín; Attendance: 12,223; Referee: Jesús Gil Manzano

19 December 2019	Lleida Esportiu (3)	0–2	Espanyol (1)	Lleida
19:00		Report	Wu Lei 53', 90'	Stadium: Camp d'Esports; Attendance: 3,000; Referee: Antonio Mateu Lahoz

19 December 2019	Peña Deportiva (3)	0–1 (a.e.t.)	Ponferradina (2)	Santa Eulària des Riu
19:00		Report	Kaxe 96'	Stadium: Municipal; Attendance: 1,000; Referee: Saúl Ais Reig

19 December 2019	Cultural Leonesa (3)	3–0	Las Rozas (3)	León
19:00	Benito 31' (pen.); Galvan 54'; Castañeda 76'	Report		Stadium: Reino de León; Attendance: 2,516; Referee: Alberto Gómez Lameiro

19 December 2019	Amorebieta (3)	0–1	Badajoz (3)	Amorebieta-Etxano
19:00		Report	Fobi 62'	Stadium: Urritxe; Attendance: 350; Referee: José Alberto Pardeiro Puente

19 December 2019	Llagostera (3)	0–1 (a.e.t.)	Haro (3)	Llagostera
20:00		Report	Duro 118'	Stadium: Municipal; Attendance: 600; Referee: Marcos Latorre Gracia

19 December 2019	Rayo Majadahonda (3)	1–0	Racing Ferrol (3)	Majadahonda
20:00	Jesús 55'	Report		Stadium: Cerro del Espino; Attendance: 80; Referee: Kevin Javier Moreno Muñoz

19 December 2019	Laredo (4)	0–1	Huesca (2)	Laredo
20:30		Report	Cristo 82'	Stadium: San Lorenzo; Attendance: 2,300; Referee: Aitor Gorostegui Fernández-Ortega

19 December 2019	Tamaraceite (4)	3–2 (a.e.t.)	Almería (2)	Las Palmas
20:30	Tejera 77'; Delgado 82'; Padrón 105'	Report	Ozornwafor 25'; Maraš 90+1'	Stadium: Juan Guedes; Attendance: 800; Referee: Miguel Ángel Ortiz Arias

19 December 2019	Gimnàstic (3)	3–1 (a.e.t.)	Olot (3)	Tarragona
20:30	Márquez 17'; Amang 110', 120'	Report	Chavarría 30'	Stadium: Nou Estadi; Attendance: 1,200; Referee: Sergio Escriche Guzmán

19 December 2019	Cornellà (3)	0–0 (a.e.t.) (4–5 p)	Orihuela (3)	Cornellà de Llobregat
20:30		Report		Stadium: Nou Camp; Attendance: 500; Referee: Lluís Bestard Servera
	Penalties
	Ramírez (penalty scored); Pérez (penalty scored); Fernández (penalty scored); De Baunbag (penalty scored); Nana (penalty missed)		(penalty scored) Andrés; (penalty scored) José Carlos; (penalty scored) Llor; Cases; (penalty scored) Solano

19 December 2019	Becerril (4)	0–8	Real Sociedad (1)	Palencia (Note: Becerril played at Nueva Balastera instead of their regular stadium Mariano Haro, in Becerril de Campos, after mutual agreement between both clubs and official approval from the Royal Spanish Football Federation.)
21:00		Report	Le Normand 37'; Januzaj 44', 46', 63'; Pardo 49'; Isak 68', 75'; Barrenetxea 69'	Stadium: Nueva Balastera; Attendance: 8,000; Referee: Mario Melero López

19 December 2019	Lorca Deportiva (4)	0–3	Osasuna (1)	Lorca
21:00		Report	Brandon 20'; Mérida 69' (pen.); Villar 75'	Stadium: Francisco Artés Carrasco; Attendance: 3,000; Referee: Valentín Pizarro Gómez

19 December 2019	Linares (4)	1–2	Girona (2)	Linares
21:00	Lara 13'	Report	Gual 49', 73'	Stadium: Linarejos; Attendance: 3,000; Referee: Dámaso Arcediano Monescillo

8 January 2020 (Note: Match started on 19 December 2019 at 20:45 and after 39 minutes played, it was suspended with 0–1 due to strong winds.)	Mérida (3)	2–2 (a.e.t.) (3–2 p)	La Nucía (3)	Mérida
20:30	Mena 49'; Pino 69'	Report	Fofo 35' (pen.); Titi 45'	Stadium: Romano; Attendance: 1,200; Referee: Fernando Bueno Prieto
	Penalties
	Pino (penalty scored); Cristo (penalty missed); Poley (penalty scored); Gaspar (penalty scored); Gómez (penalty missed)		(penalty missed) Casanova; (penalty scored) Hermosa; (penalty missed) Gracia; (penalty scored) Cabezas; (penalty missed) Fofo

8 January 2020 (Note: Match started on 17 December 2019 at 19:00 and after 18 minutes played, it was suspended with 0–0 due to heavy rain.)	Pontevedra (3)	0–2	Ibiza (3)	Pontevedra
20:30		Report	Grimà 27'; Rodado 59'	Stadium: Pasarón; Attendance: 1,180; Referee: Alexandre Alemán Pérez

== Second round ==
=== Draw ===
Teams were divided into four pots according to their division in the 2019–20 season. Tercera División teams were drawn with others from La Liga, while the rest of Segunda B and Tercera teams were drawn with teams from La Liga and Segunda División.

Pot 1; 8 teams of Tercera División and 1 team qualified through the Copa Federación	Pot 2; 19 teams of Segunda División B	Pot 3; 13 teams of Segunda División	Pot 4; 15 teams of La Liga
Cacereño; Ceuta; Escobedo; Jaén; Murcia; Portugalete; Sestao River; Tamaraceite; Zamora	Badajoz; Badalona; Barakaldo; Cartagena; Cultural Leonesa; Ebro; Gimnàstic; Haro; Ibiza; Marbella; Mérida; Orihuela; Rayo Majadahonda; Recreativo; San Sebastián de los Reyes; UCAM Murcia; UD Logroñés; Unionistas; Yeclano	Albacete; Cádiz; Deportivo La Coruña; Elche; Fuenlabrada; Girona; Huesca; Las Palmas; Mirandés; Ponferradina; Rayo Vallecano; Tenerife; Zaragoza	Athletic Bilbao; Celta Vigo; Eibar; Espanyol; Getafe; Granada; Leganés; Levante; Mallorca; Osasuna; Real Betis; Real Sociedad; Sevilla; Valladolid; Villarreal

=== Matches ===
11 January 2020	Zamora (4)	0–1	Mallorca (1)	Zamora
12:00		Report	Febas 26'	Stadium: Ruta de la Plata; Attendance: 3,306; Referee: Valentín Pizarro Gómez

11 January 2020	Gimnàstic (3)	1–3	Zaragoza (2)	Tarragona
12:00	Ballesteros 70'	Report	Rodríguez 7' (o.g.); Goldar 40' (o.g.); Papunashvili 86'	Stadium: Nou Estadi; Attendance: 3,681; Referee: Daniel Jesús Trujillo Suárez

11 January 2020	UCAM Murcia (3)	2–3 (a.e.t.)	Mirandés (2)	Murcia
12:00	Moreno 36'; Viti 80'	Report	González 57'; Vicente 61'; Álvaro Rey 114'	Stadium: La Condomina; Attendance: 2,000; Referee: Rubén Ávalos Barrera

11 January 2020	Haro (3)	1–2	Osasuna (1)	Haro
12:00	Bueno 72'	Report	Vidal 76'; Ávila 90'	Stadium: El Mazo; Attendance: 4,300; Referee: Carlos del Cerro Grande

11 January 2020	Murcia (3)	0–4	Leganés (1)	Murcia
16:00		Report	Carrillo 36', 76'; Braithwaite 62', 69'	Stadium: Enrique Roca; Attendance: 10,777; Referee: David Medié Jiménez

11 January 2020	Portugalete (4)	0–3	Real Betis (1)	Portugalete
16:00		Report	Moreno 23'; Loren 48'; Joaquín 89'	Stadium: La Florida; Attendance: 4,985; Referee: Eduardo Prieto Iglesias

11 January 2020	Ebro (3)	1–0 (a.e.t.)	Ponferradina (2)	Zaragoza
16:00	De Mesa 114'	Report		Stadium: Pedro Sancho; Attendance: 2,500; Referee: Aitor Gorostegui Fernández-Ortega

11 January 2020	Ibiza (3)	1–1 (a.e.t.) (5–3 p)	Albacete (2)	Ibiza
17:00	Núñez 66'	Report	Álvaro 43'	Stadium: Can Misses; Attendance: 4,345; Referee: Iñaki Bikandi Garrido
	Penalties
	Pérez (penalty scored); Lara (penalty scored); Gonzalo (penalty scored); Rodado (penalty scored); Mendoza (penalty scored)		(penalty scored) Ojeda; (penalty scored) Fuster; (penalty scored) Azamoum; (penalty missed) Olabe

11 January 2020	Rayo Majadahonda (3)	1–1 (a.e.t.) (2–4 p)	Tenerife (2)	Majadahonda
17:00	Mesa 56'	Report	Ruiz 16'	Stadium: Cerro del Espino; Attendance: 800; Referee: Jorge Figueroa Vázquez
	Penalties
	Llorente (penalty scored); Ródenas (penalty scored); Pulido (penalty missed); Martín (penalty missed)		(penalty scored) Santana; (penalty scored) Gómez; (penalty scored) Moore; (penalty scored) Milla

11 January 2020	Yeclano (3)	1–2	Elche (2)	Yecla
17:30	Alayeto 60'	Report	El Ghezouani 21'; Milla 78'	Stadium: La Constitución; Attendance: 4,000; Referee: Dámaso Arcediano Monescillo

11 January 2020	Badajoz (3)	2–1	Las Palmas (2)	Badajoz
18:00	Corredera 24'; Ramos 26'	Report	Rodríguez 53'	Stadium: Nuevo Vivero; Attendance: 14,500; Referee: Álvaro Moreno Aragón

11 January 2020	Sestao River (4)	0–4	Athletic Bilbao (1)	Sestao
19:00		Report	Villalibre 27', 70'; Yuri 34', 90+1'	Stadium: Las Llanas; Attendance: 7,200; Referee: Adrián Cordero Vega

11 January 2020	Badalona (3)	2–0	Getafe (1)	Badalona
19:00	Moreno 85'; Esteban 90+3'	Report		Stadium: Municipal; Attendance: 4,384; Referee: Antonio Mateu Lahoz

11 January 2020	Cultural Leonesa (3)	2–1	Huesca (2)	León
19:00	Benito 76'; Kawaya 90' (pen.)	Report	Raba 7'	Stadium: Reino de León; Attendance: 4,820; Referee: Gorka Sagués Oscoz

11 January 2020	Recreativo (3)	0–0 (a.e.t.) (5–4 p)	Fuenlabrada (2)	Huelva
19:00		Report		Stadium: Nuevo Colombino; Attendance: 5,500; Referee: Juan Luis Pulido Santana
	Penalties
	Rivero (penalty scored); Morcillo (penalty scored); Nano (penalty scored); Martínez (penalty scored); Vergé (penalty scored)		(penalty scored) Riera; (penalty scored) Ciss; (penalty missed) A. Fernández; (penalty scored) León; (penalty scored) D. Fernández

11 January 2020	Cartagena (3)	2–4 (a.e.t.)	Girona (2)	Cartagena
19:00	Martín 71'; José Ángel 75'	Report	Soriano 28', 112'; Miquel 90+4'; Martínez 115'	Stadium: Cartagonova; Attendance: 6,000; Referee: Isidro Díaz de Mera Escuderos

11 January 2020	UD Logroñés (3)	1–1 (a.e.t.) (4–2 p)	Cádiz (2)	Logroño
20:00	Vitoria 89'	Report	Querol 24'	Stadium: Las Gaunas; Attendance: 5,000; Referee: José Antonio López Toca
	Penalties
	Sáenz (penalty scored); Pérez (penalty scored); Siddiki (penalty missed); Vitoria (penalty scored); Errasti (penalty scored)		(penalty scored) Álex; (penalty missed) Carcelén; (penalty missed) Bodiger; (penalty scored) Garrido

11 January 2020	Tamaraceite (4)	0–1	Granada (1)	Las Palmas
21:00		Report	Puertas 19'	Stadium: Juan Guedes; Attendance: 800; Referee: Ricardo de Burgos Bengoetxea

11 January 2020	Marbella (3)	1–1 (a.e.t.) (1–4 p)	Valladolid (1)	Marbella
21:00	Paulo Vitor 39'	Report	Ünal 86'	Stadium: Municipal; Attendance: 3,500; Referee: Xavier Estrada Fernández
	Penalties
	Elías (penalty missed); Pérez (penalty missed); Óscar (penalty scored)		(penalty scored) Ünal; (penalty scored) Guardiola; (penalty scored) Plano; (penalty scored) Aguado

11 January 2020	Orihuela (3)	1–2 (a.e.t.)	Villarreal (1)	Orihuela
21:00	Pallarés 83'	Report	Gerard 72', 118'	Stadium: Los Arcos; Attendance: 1,800; Referee: Mario Melero López

12 January 2020	Escobedo (4)	0–5	Sevilla (1)	Camargo
12:00		Report	De Jong 17'; Nolito 38'; Ocampos 57'; Vázquez 75'; Óliver 90+1'	Stadium: Eusebio Arce; Attendance: 1,400; Referee: César Soto Grado

12 January 2020	Cacereño (4)	1–2	Eibar (1)	Cáceres
12:00	Torres 64'	Report	León 79'; Delgado 90+3' (o.g.)	Stadium: Príncipe Felipe; Attendance: 6,196; Referee: José Luis González González

12 January 2020	San Sebastián de los Reyes (3)	0–2	Espanyol (1)	San Sebastián de los Reyes
12:00		Report	Calleri 45+1'; De Tomás 85'	Stadium: Matapiñonera; Attendance: 2,800; Referee: Juan Martínez Munuera

12 January 2020	Unionistas (3)	1–1 (a.e.t.) (8–7 p)	Deportivo La Coruña (2)	Villares de la Reina
12:00	Guille 63'	Report	Valle 82'	Stadium: Pistas del Helmántico; Attendance: 3,583; Referee: Daniel Ocón Arráiz
	Penalties
	Góngora (penalty scored); De la Nava (penalty scored); Romero (penalty scored); Guille (penalty missed); Gallego (penalty scored); Wesley (penalty scored); Zubiri (penalty scored); López (penalty scored); José Ángel (penalty scored)		(penalty scored) Da Silva; (penalty missed) Shibasaki; (penalty scored) Nolaskoain; (penalty scored) Mollejo; (penalty scored) Aketxe; (penalty scored) Galán; (penalty scored) Sayago; (penalty scored) Mujaid; (penalty missed) Lambropoulos

12 January 2020	Ceuta (4)	0–4	Real Sociedad (1)	Ceuta
16:00		Report	Sangalli 55', 61'; Januzaj 56'; Barrenetxea 66'	Stadium: Alfonso Murube; Attendance: 6,000; Referee: José Luis Munuera Montero

12 January 2020	Jaén (4)	1–1 (a.e.t.) (4–5 p)	Levante (1)	Jaén
16:00	Martín 82'	Report	Sergio León 32'	Stadium: La Victoria; Attendance: 4,000; Referee: Alejandro Hernández Hernández
	Penalties
	Ocaña (penalty scored); Castillo (penalty scored); Ruiz (penalty scored); Marcelo (penalty scored); González (penalty missed)		(penalty scored) Campaña; (penalty scored) Martí; (penalty scored) Morales; (penalty scored) Bardhi; (penalty scored) Coke

12 January 2020	Mérida (3)	1–4	Celta Vigo (1)	Mérida
16:00	Poley 39' (pen.)	Report	Mina 22', 59'; Sisto 30'; Méndez 48' (pen.)	Stadium: Romano; Attendance: 7,500; Referee: Javier Alberola Rojas

12 January 2020	Barakaldo (3)	0–2	Rayo Vallecano (2)	Barakaldo
17:00		Report	Pozo 14'; Piovaccari 82'	Stadium: Lasesarre; Attendance: 5,000; Referee: Oliver De la Fuente Ramos

== Final phase ==
=== Bracket ===
Round of 32
Tenerife	2
Valladolid	1
Elche	1 (4)
Athletic Bilbao (p)	1 (5)
Ibiza	1
Barcelona	2
Ebro	0
Leganés	1
Badajoz	3
Eibar	1
Badalona	1
Granada (a.e.t.)	3
Cultural Leonesa (a.e.t.)	2
Atlético Madrid	1
UD Logroñés	0
Valencia	1
Zaragoza	3
Mallorca	1
Unionistas	1
Real Madrid	3
Real Sociedad	2
Espanyol	0
Recreativo	2
Osasuna (a.e.t.)	3
Mirandés (a.e.t.)	2
Celta Vigo	1
Sevilla	3
Levante	1
Rayo Vallecano (p)	2 (4)
Real Betis	2 (2)
Girona	0
Villarreal	3

Round of 16
Tenerife	3 (2)
Athletic Bilbao (p)	3 (4)
Barcelona	5
Leganés	0
Badajoz	2
Granada (a.e.t.)	3
Cultural Leonesa	0 (2)
Valencia (p)	0 (4)
Zaragoza	0
Real Madrid	4
Real Sociedad	3
Osasuna	1
Mirandés	3
Sevilla	1
Rayo Vallecano	0
Villarreal	2

Quarter-finals
Athletic Bilbao	1
Barcelona	0
Granada	2
Valencia	1
Real Madrid	3
Real Sociedad	4
Mirandés	4
Villarreal	2

Semi-finals
Athletic Bilbao (a)	1	1	2
Granada	0	2	2
Real Sociedad	2	1	3
Mirandés	1	0	1

Final
Athletic Bilbao	0
Real Sociedad	1

== Round of 32 ==
=== Draw ===
The four participant teams of the 2020 Supercopa de España were firstly drawn with the teams from the lowest category. After them, all the remaining teams from the lowest categories faced the rest of La Liga teams. The draw was held on 14 January 2020.

Pot 1; 8 teams of Segunda División B	Pot 2; 4 participants in Supercopa	Pot 3; 14 teams of La Liga	Pot 4; 6 teams of Segunda División
Badajoz; Badalona; Cultural Leonesa; Ebro; Ibiza; Recreativo; UD Logroñés; Unionistas	Atlético Madrid; Barcelona; Real Madrid; Valencia	Athletic Bilbao; Celta Vigo; Eibar; Espanyol; Granada; Leganés; Levante; Mallorca; Osasuna; Real Betis; Real Sociedad; Sevilla; Valladolid; Villarreal	Elche; Girona; Mirandés; Rayo Vallecano; Tenerife; Zaragoza

=== Matches ===
21 January 2020	Recreativo (3)	2–3 (a.e.t.)	Osasuna (1)	Huelva
19:00	Morcillo 13'; Roncaglia 45' (o.g.)	Report	Brašanac 76'; Ávila 83'; Pérez 111'	Stadium: Nuevo Colombino; Attendance: 5,000; Referee: Jesús Gil Manzano

21 January 2020	Zaragoza (2)	3–1	Mallorca (1)	Zaragoza
19:00	Blanco 48'; Puado 54'; Linares 75'	Report	Febas 85'	Stadium: La Romareda; Attendance: 6,000; Referee: Antonio Mateu Lahoz

21 January 2020	Sevilla (1)	3–1	Levante (1)	Seville
21:00	Fernando 13'; Ocampos 46'; Óliver 78'	Report	Duarte 31'	Stadium: Ramón Sánchez Pizjuán; Attendance: 28,104; Referee: José María Sánchez Martínez

22 January 2020	Ibiza (3)	1–2	Barcelona (1)	Ibiza
19:00	Caballé 9'	Report	Griezmann 72', 90+4'	Stadium: Can Misses; Attendance: 6,500; Referee: Pablo González Fuertes

22 January 2020	Elche (2)	1–1 (a.e.t.) (4–5 p)	Athletic Bilbao (1)	Elche
19:00	Fidel 41'	Report	Williams 5'	Stadium: Manuel Martínez Valero; Attendance: 13,834; Referee: José Luis Munuera Montero
	Penalties
	Manuel (penalty scored); Folch (penalty scored); Nino (penalty scored); Qasmi (penalty missed); Sánchez (penalty missed); Calvo (penalty scored); Tekio (penalty missed)		(penalty missed) R. García; (penalty scored) Muniain; (penalty missed) López; (penalty scored) Williams; (penalty scored) Villalibre; (penalty scored) Yuri; (penalty scored) Vesga

22 January 2020	UD Logroñés (3)	0–1	Valencia (1)	Logroño
21:00		Report	Gómez 15'	Stadium: Las Gaunas; Attendance: 11,152; Referee: Adrián Cordero Vega

22 January 2020	Unionistas (3)	1–3	Real Madrid (1)	Villares de la Reina
21:00	Romero 57'	Report	Bale 18'; Góngora 62' (o.g.); Brahim 90+2'	Stadium: Pistas del Helmántico; Attendance: 4,000; Referee: Mario Melero López

22 January 2020	Badalona (3)	1–3 (a.e.t.)	Granada (1)	Badalona
21:00	Robusté 58'	Report	Köybaşı 2'; Gonalons 102'; Fernández 110'	Stadium: Municipal; Attendance: 3,200; Referee: Santiago Jaime Latre

22 January 2020	Tenerife (2)	2–1	Valladolid (1)	Santa Cruz de Tenerife
21:00	Joselu 67'; Gómez 86' (pen.)	Report	Sandro 52'	Stadium: Heliodoro Rodríguez López; Attendance: 8,403; Referee: David Medié Jiménez

22 January 2020	Girona (2)	0–3	Villarreal (1)	Girona
21:00		Report	Funes Mori 54'; Cazorla 70'; Chukwueze 72'	Stadium: Montilivi; Attendance: 928; Referee: Guillermo Cuadra Fernández

22 January 2020	Real Sociedad (1)	2–0	Espanyol (1)	San Sebastián
21:00	Barrenetxea 45+1'; Isak 62'	Report		Stadium: Reale Arena; Attendance: 21,647; Referee: Alejandro Hernández Hernández

23 January 2020	Ebro (3)	0–1	Leganés (1)	Zaragoza
19:00		Report	Silva 44'	Stadium: Pedro Sancho; Attendance: 1,800; Referee: José Luis González González

23 January 2020	Mirandés (2)	2–1 (a.e.t.)	Celta Vigo (1)	Miranda de Ebro
19:00	Matheus 28' (pen.); Sánchez 114'	Report	Sisto 74'	Stadium: Anduva; Attendance: 2,407; Referee: Juan Martínez Munuera

23 January 2020	Cultural Leonesa (3)	2–1 (a.e.t.)	Atlético Madrid (1)	León
21:00	Castañeda 83'; Benito 108'	Report	Correa 62'	Stadium: Reino de León; Attendance: 12,252; Referee: Javier Alberola Rojas

23 January 2020	Badajoz (3)	3–1	Eibar (1)	Badajoz
21:00	Fobi 8'; Corredera 21' (pen.); Vázquez 72'	Report	Charles 29' (pen.)	Stadium: Nuevo Vivero; Attendance: 11,864; Referee: Carlos del Cerro Grande

23 January 2020	Rayo Vallecano (2)	2–2 (a.e.t.) (4–2 p)	Real Betis (1)	Madrid
21:00	Catena 47'; Martín 118'	Report	Joaquín 84'; Loren 97'	Stadium: Vallecas; Attendance: 11,800; Referee: Ricardo de Burgos Bengoetxea
	Penalties
	Suárez (penalty scored); Pozo (penalty scored); Saúl (penalty scored); Catena (penalty scored)		(penalty missed) Joaquín; (penalty scored) Loren; (penalty scored) Aleñá; (penalty missed) Tello

== Round of 16 ==
=== Draw ===
Six teams of La Liga were firstly drawn with the teams from the lower categories. After them, all the remaining teams from La Liga teams faced one another. The draw was held on 24 January 2020.

Pot 1; 2 teams of Segunda B	Pot 2; 4 teams of Segunda	Pot 3; 10 teams of La Liga
Badajoz; Cultural Leonesa	Mirandés; Rayo Vallecano; Tenerife; Zaragoza	Athletic Bilbao; Barcelona; Granada; Leganés; Osasuna; Real Madrid; Real Sociedad; Sevilla; Valencia; Villarreal

=== Matches ===
28 January 2020	Tenerife (2)	3–3 (a.e.t.) (2–4 p)	Athletic Bilbao (1)	Santa Cruz de Tenerife
21:00	Joselu 8' (pen.), 21'; Gómez 105+1' (pen.)	Report	Williams 17', 54'; Berchiche 118'	Stadium: Heliodoro Rodríguez López; Attendance: 17,482; Referee: Pablo González Fuertes
	Penalties
	Sanz (penalty scored); Nahuel (penalty scored); Joselu (penalty missed); Moore (penalty missed)		(penalty scored) R. García; (penalty scored) Muniain; (penalty scored) Vesga; (penalty missed) Martínez; (penalty scored) Villalibre

29 January 2020	Cultural Leonesa (3)	0–0 (a.e.t.) (2–4 p)	Valencia (1)	León
19:00		Report		Stadium: Reino de León; Attendance: 12,448; Referee: Valentín Pizarro Gómez
	Penalties
	Menudo (penalty missed); Benito (penalty missed); Pichín (penalty scored); Montes (penalty scored)		(penalty scored) Coquelin; (penalty scored) Soler; (penalty scored) Gómez; (penalty scored) Parejo

29 January 2020	Rayo Vallecano (2)	0–2	Villarreal (1)	Madrid
19:00		Report	Niño 84'; Cazorla 85'	Stadium: Vallecas; Attendance: 7,500; Referee: Eduardo Prieto Iglesias

29 January 2020	Badajoz (3)	2–3 (a.e.t.)	Granada (1)	Badajoz
21:00	Vázquez 8'; Caballero 90+3'	Report	Á. Martínez 1'; Soldado 86'; Fernández 109'	Stadium: Nuevo Vivero; Attendance: 14,898; Referee: César Soto Grado

29 January 2020	Zaragoza (2)	0–4	Real Madrid (1)	Zaragoza
21:00		Report	Varane 6'; Vázquez 32'; Vinícius 72'; Benzema 79'	Stadium: La Romareda; Attendance: 31,500; Referee: José Luis González González

29 January 2020	Real Sociedad (1)	3–1	Osasuna (1)	San Sebastián
19:00	Isak 33', 69'; Ødegaard 61'	Report	Cardona 36'	Stadium: Reale Arena; Attendance: 31,236; Referee: José Luis Munuera Montero

30 January 2020	Barcelona (1)	5–0	Leganés (1)	Barcelona
19:00	Griezmann 4'; Lenglet 27'; Messi 59', 89'; Arthur 77'	Report		Stadium: Camp Nou; Attendance: 43,216; Referee: Guillermo Cuadra Fernández

30 January 2020	Mirandés (2)	3–1	Sevilla (1)	Miranda de Ebro
21:00	Matheus 7', 30'; Álvaro Rey 85'	Report	Nolito 90+1'	Stadium: Anduva; Attendance: 4,500; Referee: Santiago Jaime Latre

== Quarter-finals ==
=== Draw ===
All 8 teams were in one pot, and the home team was decided by the luck of the draw. As the only remaining Segunda División side, Mirandés hosted its opponent regardless, as per the rules. The draw took place on 31 January 2020.

=== Matches ===
4 February 2020	Granada (1)	2–1	Valencia (1)	Granada
21:00	Soldado 3', 90+4' (pen.)	Report	Rodrigo 40'	Stadium: Nuevo Los Cármenes; Attendance: 16,551; Referee: José Luis González González

5 February 2020	Mirandés (2)	4–2	Villarreal (1)	Miranda de Ebro
21:00	Matheus 17'; Merquelanz 45+3' (pen.); Onaindia 58'; Sánchez 90+2'	Report	Ontiveros 32'; Cazorla 55' (pen.)	Stadium: Anduva; Attendance: 4,428; Referee: Ricardo de Burgos Bengoetxea

6 February 2020	Real Madrid (1)	3–4	Real Sociedad (1)	Madrid
19:00	Marcelo 59'; Rodrygo 81'; Nacho 90+3'	Report	Ødegaard 22'; Isak 54', 56'; Merino 69'	Stadium: Santiago Bernabéu; Attendance: 64,012; Referee: Antonio Mateu Lahoz

6 February 2020	Athletic Bilbao (1)	1–0	Barcelona (1)	Bilbao
21:00	Busquets 90+3' (o.g.)	Report		Stadium: San Mamés; Attendance: 49,154; Referee: Juan Martínez Munuera

== Semi-finals ==
The draw for the semi-finals took place on 7 February 2020.

=== Summary ===
Team 1	Agg.	Team 2	1st leg	2nd leg
Real Sociedad (1)	3–1	Mirandés (2)	2–1	1–0
Athletic Bilbao (1)	2–2 (a)	Granada (1)	1–0	1–2

=== Matches ===
13 February 2020
21:00

Real Sociedad	2–1	Mirandés
Oyarzabal 9' (pen.); Ødegaard 42'	Report	Matheus 39'

Reale Arena, San Sebastián
Attendance: 35,194
Referee: Jesús Gil Manzano
4 March 2020
21:00

Mirandés	0–1	Real Sociedad
	Report	Oyarzabal 41' (pen.)

Anduva, Miranda de Ebro
Attendance: 5,583
Referee: José María Sánchez Martínez

Real Sociedad won 3–1 on aggregate.

12 February 2020
21:00

Athletic Bilbao	1–0	Granada
Muniain 42'	Report

San Mamés, Bilbao
Attendance: 48,149
Referee: Alejandro Hernández Hernández
5 March 2020
21:00

Granada	2–1	Athletic Bilbao
Fernández 48'; Germán 76'	Report	Berchiche 81'

Nuevo Los Cármenes, Granada
Attendance: 20,799
Referee: Carlos del Cerro Grande

2–2 on aggregate. Athletic Bilbao won on away goals.

== Final ==
The final was originally scheduled for 18 April 2020, but was postponed to 3 April 2021 due to the COVID-19 pandemic.

3 April 2021
21:30 CEST

Athletic Bilbao	0–1	Real Sociedad
	Report	Oyarzabal 63' (pen.)

La Cartuja, Seville
Attendance: 0 (Note: The match was played behind closed doors due to the COVID-19 pandemic in Spain.)
Referee: Xavier Estrada Fernández (Catalonia)

== Top scorers ==
Rank	Player	Club	Goals
1	(Sweden) Alexander Isak	Real Sociedad	7
2	(Brazil) Matheus	Mirandés	6
3	(Spain) Yuri Berchiche	Athletic Bilbao	4
3	(Spain) Santi Cazorla	Villarreal	4
3	(Belgium) Adnan Januzaj	Real Sociedad	4
3	(Spain) Roberto Soldado	Granada	4
7	(Colombia) Carlos Bacca	Villarreal	3
7	(Spain) Ander Barrenetxea	Real Sociedad	3
7	(Spain) Sergio Benito	Cultural Leonesa	3
7	(Argentina) Guido Carrillo	Leganés	3
7	(Brazil) Charles	Eibar	3
7	(Argentina) Pablo de Blasis	Eibar	3
7	(Spain) Carlos Fernández	Granada	3
7	(France) Antoine Griezmann	Barcelona	3
7	(Spain) Joselu	Tenerife	3
7	(Norway) Martin Ødegaard	Real Sociedad	3
7	(Spain) Mikel Oyarzabal	Real Sociedad	3
7	(Spain) Álvaro Rey	Mirandés	3
7	(Spain) Iñaki Williams	Athletic Bilbao	3
