= 2019–20 Deportivo de La Coruña season =

Deportivo de La Coruña
2019–20 season
- President: Fernando Vidal
- Head coach: Luis César Sampedro (until 27 December); Fernando Vázquez (from 29 December)
- Stadium: Abanca-Riazor
- Segunda División: 19th (relegated)
- Copa del Rey: Second round
- Top goalscorer: League: Víctor Mollejo (5 goals); All: Mamadou Koné; Víctor Mollejo (5 goals each)
Home colours	Away colours	Third colours

The 2019–20 season was Deportivo de La Coruña's 113th season in existence and the club's second consecutive season in the second division of Spanish football. In addition to the domestic league, Deportivo La Coruña participated in this season's edition of the Copa del Rey. The season was slated to cover a period from 1 July 2019 to 30 June 2020. It was extended extraordinarily beyond 30 June due to the COVID-19 pandemic in Spain.

In the end, Deportivo was relegated to Segunda División B in spite of seven consecutive wins in the league at the end of the autumn. The bad start and finish to the season confirmed the relegation.

On the last matchday, the match against Fuenlabrada was suddenly postponed after it was found that a number of the club's players were infected with the coronavirus when the visiting team arrived in A Coruña. However, the other matches of the teams threatened with relegation took place as usual and ended with the victory of both Lugo and Albacete to avoid going down to the third division and relegating Deportivo without even playing their match. Deportivo then threatened not to play their final match if the whole of matchday 42 was not replayed.

== Players ==
=== Current squad ===
As of 15 March 2020

Note: Flags indicate national team as defined under FIFA eligibility rules; some limited exceptions apply. Players may hold more than one non-FIFA nationality.

No.	Pos.	Nation	Player
1	GK	ESP	Dani Giménez
2	DF	ESP	David Simón
3	DF	ITA	Michele Somma
4	MF	ESP	Álex Bergantiños (captain)
5	DF	SEN	Abdoulaye Ba (on loan from Rayo Vallecano)
6	MF	ESP	Peru Nolaskoain (on loan from Athletic Bilbao)
7	MF	ESP	Borja Valle
8	MF	ESP	Vicente Gómez
9	FW	VEN	Christian Santos
10	MF	ESP	Ager Aketxe
11	FW	ESP	Víctor Mollejo (on loan from Atlético Madrid)
13	GK	SRB	Aleksandar Jovanović (on loan from Huesca)
14	DF	ESP	Luis Ruiz

No.	Pos.	Nation	Player
15	DF	ESP	Javi Montero (on loan from Atlético Madrid)
16	FW	ESP	Sabin Merino
17	MF	TUR	Emre Çolak
19	FW	CIV	Mamadou Koné (on loan from Leganés)
20	FW	GLP	Claudio Beauvue
21	DF	ESP	Salva Ruiz
22	MF	JPN	Gaku Shibasaki
23	FW	ESP	Keko Gontán
24	DF	ESP	Eneko Bóveda
25	MF	NGR	Uche Agbo (on loan from Standard Liège)
29	DF	ESP	Mujaid Sadick
35	FW	ESP	Hugo Vallejo (on loan from Real Madrid)

=== Out on loan ===
Note: Flags indicate national team as defined under FIFA eligibility rules; some limited exceptions apply. Players may hold more than one non-FIFA nationality.

No.	Pos.	Nation	Player
—	GK	NGR	Francis Uzoho (on loan at Omonia until 30 June 2020)
—	DF	ESP	Gerard Valentín (on loan at Lugo until 30 June 2020)
—	DF	GRE	Vasilis Lampropoulos (on loan at VfL Bochum until 30 June 2020)

No.	Pos.	Nation	Player
—	MF	ARG	Fede Cartabia (on loan at Shabab Dubai until 30 June 2020)
—	FW	URU	Diego Rolán (on loan at Juárez until 30 June 2020)
—	FW	ESP	Borja Galán (on loan at Racing until 30 June 2020)

== Pre-season and friendlies ==
Win Draw Loss Fixtures

== Competitions ==
=== Overview ===
Competition	First match	Last match	Starting round	Final position	Record							
Competition	First match	Last match	Starting round	Final position	Pld	W	D	L	GF	GA	GD	Win %
Segunda División	18 August 2020	7 August 2020	Matchday 1	19th	42	12	15	15	43	60	−17	28.57
Copa del Rey	17 December 2020	12 January 2020	First round	Second round	2	1	1	0	3	1	+2	50.00
Total					44	13	16	15	46	61	−15	29.55

Last updated: 7 August 2020
Source: Competitions

=== Segunda División ===
==== League table ====
Pos	Team	Pld	W	D	L	GF	GA	GD	Pts	Promotion, qualification or relegation
17	Albacete	42	13	13	16	36	46	−10	52 (Note: Lugo finished ahead of Albacete on head-to-head points: Albacete 0–1 Lugo, Lugo 1–0 Albacete.)	
18	Ponferradina	42	12	15	15	45	50	−5	51 (Note: Ponferradina finished ahead of Deportivo La Coruña on head-to-head goal difference: Ponferradina 2–0 Deportivo La Coruña, Deportivo La Coruña 2–1 Ponferradina.)	
19	Deportivo La Coruña (R)	42	12	15	15	43	60	−17	51	Relegation to Segunda División B
20	Numancia (R)	42	13	11	18	45	53	−8	50	Relegation to Segunda División B
21	Extremadura (R)	42	10	13	19	43	59	−16	43	Relegation to Segunda División B

Source: LaLiga Soccerway
Rules for classification: 1) points; 2) head-to-head points; 3) head-to-head goal difference; 4) goal difference; 5) number of goals scored
(R) Relegated

==== Results summary ====
Overall								Home						Away					
Pld	W	D	L	GF	GA	GD	Pts	W	D	L	GF	GA	GD	W	D	L	GF	GA	GD
42	12	15	15	43	60	−17	51	8	8	5	29	29	0	4	7	10	14	31	−17

Last updated: 7 August 2020.
Source: La Liga SmartBank

==== Results by round ====
Round	1	2	3	4	5	6	7	8	9	10	11	12	13	14	15	16	17	18	19	20	21	22	23	24	25	26	27	28	29	30	31	32	33	34	35	36	37	38	39	40	41	42
Ground	A	H	A	H	A	H	A	H	A	H	H	A	H	A	H	A	H	A	H	A	H	A	H	A	H	A	A	H	A	H	H	A	H	A	H	A	H	A	H	A	H	A
Result	W	L	L	L	D	D	D	D	L	D	L	L	D	D	L	L	D	D	L	L	W	W	W	W	W	W	W	D	L	D	L	D	D	D	W	W	D	W	L	L	L	W
Position	5	8	14	19	18	19	18	19	21	20	22	22	22	22	22	22	22	22	22	22	22	22	21	20	17	15	14	16	17	17	19	19	18	18	16	16	17	15	16	17	19	19

Updated to match(es) played on 7 August 2020. Source: La Liga SmartBank
A = Away; H = Home; W = Win; D = Draw; L = Loss

==== Matches ====
The fixtures were revealed on 4 July 2019.

18 August 2019 1	Deportivo La Coruña	3–2	Real Oviedo	A Coruña
18:00 CEST (UTC+2)				Stadium: Abanca-Riazor

25 August 2019 2	Huesca	3–1	Deportivo de La Coruña	Huesca
19:00 CEST (UTC+2)				Stadium: El Alcoraz

1 September 2019 3	Rayo Vallecano	3–1	Deportivo de La Coruña	Madrid
18:00 CEST (UTC+2)				Stadium: Vallecas

7 September 2019 4	Deportivo de La Coruña	0–1	Albacete	A Coruña
16:00 CEST (UTC+2)				Stadium: Abanca-Riazor

15 September 2019 5	Sporting Gijón	1–1	Deportivo de La Coruña	Gijón
21:00 CEST (UTC+2)				Stadium: El Molinón

18 September 2019 6	Deportivo de La Coruña	3–3	Numancia	A Coruña
21:00 CEST (UTC+2)				Stadium: Abanca-Riazor

21 September 2019 7	Cádiz	0–0	Deportivo de La Coruña	Cádiz
16:00 CEST (UTC+2)		Report		Stadium: Ramón de Carranza; Attendance: 16,133; Referee: Dámaso Arcediano Monescillo

29 September 2019 8	Deportivo de La Coruña	1–1	Mirandés	A Coruña
21:00 CEST (UTC+2)				Stadium: Abanca-Riazor

3 October 2019 9	Girona	3–1	Deportivo de La Coruña	Girona
21:00 CEST (UTC+2)				Stadium: Montilivi

6 October 2019 10	Deportivo de La Coruña	0–0	Almería	A Coruña
18:30 CEST (UTC+2)				Stadium: Abanca-Riazor

13 October 2019 11	Las Palmas	3–0	Deportivo de La Coruña	Las Palmas
21:00 CEST (UTC+2)				Stadium: Gran Canaria

20 October 2019 12	Deportivo de La Coruña	0–2	Málaga	A Coruña
16:00 CEST (UTC+2)				Stadium: Abanca-Riazor

26 October 2019 13	Racing Santander	1–1	Deportivo de La Coruña	Santander
18:00 CEST (UTC+2)	Yoda 10'; Mario Ortiz (yellow card) 81'; Hidalgo (yellow card) 90+3'	Report	Bóveda (yellow card) 13'; Longo (yellow card) 30'; Koné (yellow card) 65'; Jovanović 67'	Stadium: El Sardinero; Attendance: 14,105; Referee: Rubén Ávalos Barrera

2 November 2019 14	Fuenlabrada	1–1	Deportivo de La Coruña	Fuenlabrada
16:00 CET (UTC+1)				Stadium: Fernando Torres

10 November 2019 15	Deportivo de La Coruña	1–3	Elche	A Coruña
12:00 CET (UTC+1)				Stadium: Abanca-Riazor

16 November 2019 16	Extremadura	2–0	Deportivo de La Coruña	Almendralejo
16:00 CET (UTC+1)				Stadium: Ciudad de Almendralejo

23 November 2019 17	Deportivo de La Coruña	0–0	Alcorcón	A Coruña
18:00 CET (UTC+1)				Stadium: Abanca-Riazor

1 December 2019 18	Lugo	0–0	Deportivo La Coruña	Lugo
18:00 CET (UTC+1)				Stadium: Anxo Carro

8 December 2019 19	Deportivo de La Coruña	1–3	Real Zaragoza	A Coruña
16:00 CET (UTC+1)	Gómez (yellow card) 5'; Valle 48'	Report	Guitián 33'; Puado 39'; Suárez (yellow card) 72', (goal) 80'; Kagawa (yellow card) 84'	Stadium: Abanca-Riazor; Attendance: 13,604; Referee: Iosu Galech Apezteguía

14 December 2019 20	Ponferradina	2–0	Deportivo de La Coruña	Ponferrada
18:00 CET (UTC+1)				Stadium: El Toralín

20 December 2019 21	Deportivo de La Coruña	2–1	Tenerife	A Coruña
21:00 CET (UTC+1)				Stadium: Abanca-Riazor

5 January 2020 22	Numancia	0–1	Deportivo de La Coruña	Soria
12:00 CET (UTC+1)				Stadium: Carlos Tartiere

16 January 2020 23	Deportivo de La Coruña	2–1	Racing Santander	A Coruña
19:00 CET (UTC+1)	Merino 32'; Çolak 54'	Report	Cejudo 15'	Stadium: Abanca-Riazor; Attendance: 19,055; Referee: Rubén Ávalos Barrera

19 January 2020 24	Deportivo de La Coruña	1–0	Cádiz	A Coruña
16:00 CET (UTC+1)	Merino 65'	Report		Stadium: Abanca-Riazor; Attendance: 24,229; Referee: Aitor Gorostegui Fernández-Ortega

26 January 2020 25	Albacete	0–1	Deportivo de La Coruña	Albacete
16:00 CET (UTC+1)				Stadium: Carlos Belmonte

1 February 2020 26	Deportivo de La Coruña	2–1	Las Palmas	A Coruña
18:15 CET (UTC+1)				Stadium: Abanca-Riazor

9 February 2020 27	Alcorcón	0–1	Deportivo de La Coruña	Alcorcón
12:00 CET (UTC+1)				Stadium: Santo Domingo

14 February 2020 28	Deportivo de La Coruña	2–2	Girona	A Coruña
21:00 CET (UTC+1)				Stadium: Abanca-Riazor

23 February 2020 29	Real Zaragoza	3–1	Deportivo de La Coruña	Zaragoza
16:00 CET (UTC+1)	Eguaras 6'; Clemente (yellow card) 14'; Atienza 32'; Suárez 62'; El Yamiq (yellow card) 67'	Report	Mollejo 12', (yellow card) 55'; Shibasaki (yellow card) 22' (yellow-red card) 60'; Mujaid (yellow card) 84'; Aketxe (yellow card) 86'	Stadium: La Romareda; Attendance: 28,098; Referee: José Antonio López Toca

1 March 2020 30	Deportivo de La Coruña	0–0	Lugo	A Coruña
16:00 CET (UTC+1)				Stadium: Abanca-Riazor

7 March 2020 31	Almería	4–0	Deportivo de La Coruña	Almería
21:00 CET (UTC+1)				Stadium: Juegos Mediterráneos

14 June 2020 32	Deportivo devLa Coruña	0–0	Sporting Gijón	A Coruña
17:00 CEST (UTC+2)				Stadium: Abanca-Riazor; Attendance: 0

17 June 2020 33	Real Oviedo	2–2	Deportivo de La Coruña	Oviedo
19:30 CEST (UTC+2)				Stadium: Carlos Tartiere; Attendance: 0

20 June 2020 34	Deportivo de La Coruña	3–3	Rayo Vallecano	A Coruña
17:00 CEST (UTC+2)	Santos 50'; Mollejo 52'; Aketxe 89' (pen.)	Report	Villar 1', 21'; Suárez (yellow card) 57', (goal) 90+3' (pen.); Martín (yellow card) 81'; Dimitrievski (yellow card) 87'	Stadium: Abanca-Riazor; Attendance: 0 Referee: Iñaki Vicandi Garrido

23 June 2020 35	Elche	0–1	Deportivo de La Coruña	Elche
19:30 CEST (UTC+2)				Stadium: Martínez Valero; Attendance: 0

27 June 2020 36	Deportivo de La Coruña	2–1	Ponferradina	A Coruña
17:00 CEST (UTC+2)	David Simón (yellow card) 38'; Uche (yellow card) 45+2'; Montero (yellow card) 58'; Trigueros 90+2' (o.g.); Çolak 90+5', (yellow card) 90+5'	Report	Kaxe 59'; Rodríguez (yellow card) 65'	Stadium: Abanca-Riazor; Attendance: 0 Referee: Juan Luis Pulido Santana

30 June 2020 37	Tenerife	1–1	Deportivo de La Coruña	Santa Cruz de Tenerife
19:30 CEST (UTC+2)	Sanz (yellow card) 55'; López (yellow card) 63'; Milla 82' (pen.)	Report	Mujaid (yellow card) 80'; Aketxe 90+2'	Stadium: Heliodoro Rodríguez López; Attendance: 0 Referee: Miguel Ángel Ortiz Arias

5 July 2020 38	Deportivo de La Coruña	2–1	Huesca	A Coruña
17:00 CEST (UTC+2)	Aketxe 19'; Santos 43'; Shibasaki (yellow card) 47'; Bóveda (yellow card) 84'	Report	Mir 8'; Pulido (yellow card) 29'; Luisinho (yellow card) 45+2'	Stadium: Abanca-Riazor; Attendance: 0 Referee: Saúl Ais Reig

8 July 2020 39	Málaga	1–0	Deportivo de La Coruña	Málaga
19:30 CEST (UTC+2)	Benkhemassa (yellow card) 38'; Boussefiane 61'	Report	Shibasaki (yellow card) 23'; Mollejo (yellow card) 63'; Santos (yellow card) 71'; Mujaid (yellow card) 72'	Stadium: La Rosaleda; Attendance: 0 Referee: José Antonio López Toca

12 July 2020 40	Deportivo de La Coruña	2–3	Extremadura	A Coruña
17:00 CEST (UTC+2)	Simón 4'; Santos 89'	Report	Rodríguez (yellow card) 14'; Montero 68' (o.g.); Pinchi 84', 90+2'; Carrasco (yellow card) 88'	Stadium: Abanca-Riazor; Attendance: 0 Referee: Dámaso Arcediano Monescillo

17 July 2020 41	Mirandés	1–0	Deportivo de La Coruña	Miranda de Ebro
21:00 CEST (UTC+2)	Malsa (yellow card) 7'; Merquelanz 23'; A. González (yellow card) 56'; Sánchez (yellow card) 64'; S. González (yellow card) 81'; Marcos André (yellow card) 89'	Report	Bóveda (yellow card) 22'; Mollejo (yellow card) 90+3'	Stadium: Anduva; Attendance: 0 Referee: Víctor Areces Franco

7 August 2020 42	Deportivo de La Coruña	2–1	Fuenlabrada	A Coruña
20:00 CEST (UTC+2)	Aketxe (yellow card) 2'; Valle (yellow card) 39'; Beauvue 84', 90+5' (pen.)	Report	Ciss 11'; Nketa (yellow card) 42'	Stadium: Abanca-Riazor; Attendance: 0 Referee: Isidro Díaz de Mera Escuderos

=== Copa del Rey ===
17 December 2019 First round	Illueca	0–2	Deportivo La Coruña	Illueca
19:00 CET (UTC+1)		Report	Longo 85' (pen.); Koné 86'	Stadium: Papa Luna; Attendance: 2,000; Referee: Gorka Sagués Oscoz

12 January 2020 Second round	Unionistas	1–1 (a.e.t.) (8–7 p)	Deportivo La Coruña	Villares de la Reina
12:00 CET (UTC+1)	Guille 63'	Report	Valle 82'	Stadium: Pistas del Helmántico; Attendance: 3,583; Referee: Daniel Ocón Arráiz
	Penalties
	Góngora (penalty scored); De la Nava (penalty scored); Romero (penalty scored); Guille (penalty missed); Gallego (penalty scored); Wesley (penalty scored); Zubiri (penalty scored); López (penalty scored); José Ángel (penalty scored)		(penalty scored) Da Silva; (penalty missed) Shibasaki; (penalty scored) Nolaskoain; (penalty scored) Mollejo; (penalty scored) Aketxe; (penalty scored) Galán; (penalty scored) Sayago; (penalty scored) Mujaid; (penalty missed) Lambropoulos
