= 2019–20 Valencia CF season =

100th season in existence of Valencia CF

Valencia
2019–20 season
- Owner: Peter Lim
- President: Anil Murthy
- Head coach: Marcelino (until 11 September); Albert Celades (from 11 September to 29 June); Voro (interim, from 29 June)
- Stadium: Mestalla
- La Liga: 9th
- Copa del Rey: Quarter-finals
- Supercopa de España: Semi-finals
- UEFA Champions League: Round of 16
- Top goalscorer: League: Maxi Gómez (10); All: Maxi Gómez (11)
Home colours	Away colours	Third colours

The 2019–20 Valencia Club de Fútbol season was the club's 100th in the club's history and their 85th in La Liga. The club had qualified for the UEFA Champions League for the second season in a row, entering in the group stage. Valencia failed to defend the Copa del Rey that they won the previous season, losing to Granada in the quarter-finals after entering at the round of 32. As a result of the Copa del Rey win, Valencia competed in the Spanish Super Cup for the first time since 2008.

== Players ==
=== Squad information ===
No.	Pos.	Nat.	Name	Date of birth (age)	Signed in	Contract ends	Signed from
Goalkeepers
1	GK	(Spain)	Jaume Doménech	5 November 1990 (age 36)	2015	2022	(Spain) Valencia Mestalla
13	GK	(Netherlands)	Jasper Cillessen	22 April 1989 (age 37)	2019	2023	(Spain) Barcelona
28	GK	(Spain)	Cristian Rivero	21 March 1998 (age 28)	2019	2022	(Spain) Valencia Mestalla
Defenders
2	DF	(Portugal)	Thierry Correia	9 March 1999 (age 27)	2019	2024	(Portugal) Sporting CP
3	DF	(Spain)	Jaume Costa	18 March 1988 (age 38)	2019 (Loan)	2020	(Spain) Villarreal
4	DF	(France)	Eliaquim Mangala	13 February 1991 (age 35)	2019	2021	(England) Manchester City
5	DF	(Brazil)	Gabriel Paulista	26 December 1990 (age 35)	2017	2022	(England) Arsenal
12	DF	(France)	Mouctar Diakhaby	19 December 1996 (age 29)	2018	2023	(France) Lyon
14	DF	(Spain)	José Luis Gayà (3rd Captain)	25 May 1995 (age 31)	2012	2023	(Spain) Valencia Mestalla
21	DF	(Italy)	Cristiano Piccini	26 September 1992 (age 34)	2018	2022	(Portugal) Sporting CP
24	DF	(Argentina)	Ezequiel Garay	10 October 1986 (age 40)	2016	2020	(Russia) Zenit Saint Petersburg
25	DF	(Italy)	Alessandro Florenzi	11 March 1991 (age 35)	2020 (Loan)	2020	(Italy) Roma
33	DF	(Spain)	Hugo Guillamón	31 January 2000 (age 26)	2018	2020	(Spain) Valencia Mestalla
Midfielders
6	MF	(Central African Republic)	Geoffrey Kondogbia	15 February 1993 (age 33)	2017	2022	(Italy) Internazionale
8	MF	(Spain)	Carlos Soler	2 January 1997 (age 29)	2016	2021	(Spain) Valencia Mestalla
10	MF	(Spain)	Dani Parejo (Captain)	16 April 1989 (age 37)	2011	2022	(Spain) Getafe
16	MF	(South Korea)	Lee Kang-in	19 February 2001 (age 25)	2018	2022	(Spain) Valencia Mestalla
17	MF	(France)	Francis Coquelin	13 May 1991 (age 35)	2018	2022	(England) Arsenal
18	DF	(Denmark)	Daniel Wass	31 May 1989 (age 37)	2018	2022	(Spain) Celta Vigo
20	MF	(Spain)	Ferran Torres	29 February 2000 (age 26)	2017	2021	(Spain) Valencia Mestalla
34	MF	(Spain)	Vicente Esquerdo	2 January 1999 (age 27)	2018	2020	(Spain) Valencia Mestalla
Forwards
7	FW	(Portugal)	Gonçalo Guedes	29 November 1996 (age 29)	2017	2023	(France) Paris Saint-Germain
9	FW	(France)	Kevin Gameiro	9 May 1987 (age 39)	2018	2021	(Spain) Atlético Madrid
11	FW	(Russia)	Denis Cheryshev	26 November 1990 (age 35)	2018	2022	(Spain) Villarreal
15	FW	(Spain)	Manu Vallejo	14 February 1997 (age 29)	2019	2024	(Spain) Cádiz
19	FW	(Spain)	Rodrigo Moreno (VC)	6 April 1991 (age 35)	2014	2022	(Portugal) Benfica
22	FW	(Uruguay)	Maxi Gómez	14 August 1996 (age 30)	2019	2024	(Spain) Celta Vigo
23	FW	(Spain)	Rubén Sobrino	1 June 1992 (age 34)	2018	2022	(Spain) Alavés

== Transfers ==
=== In ===
No.	Pos.	Nat.	Name	Age	EU	Moving from	Type	Transfer window	Ends	Transfer fee	Source
	MF	(Serbia)	Uroš Račić	21	Non-EU	(Spain) Tenerife	Loan return	Summer	2022	N/A	
	DF	(Tunisia)	Aymen Abdennour	29	Non-EU	(France) Marseille	Loan return	Summer	2022	N/A	
	MF	(Spain)	Nacho Gil	23	EU	(Spain) Elche	Loan return	Summer	2022	N/A	
	MF	(Spain)	Álvaro Medrán	25	EU	(Spain) Rayo Vallecano	Loan return	Summer	2022	N/A	
	DF	(Colombia)	Jeison Murillo	23	Non-EU	(Spain) Barcelona	Loan return	Summer	2022	N/A	
	MF	(Spain)	Salva Ruiz	24	EU	(Spain) Mallorca	Transfer	Summer	2022	Free	
	MF	(Spain)	Jason	24	EU	(Spain) Levante	Transfer	Summer	2022	Free	
	DF	(Spain)	Jorge Sáenz	22	EU	(Spain) Tenerife	Transfer	Summer	2024	€3,000,000	
15	MF	(Spain)	Manu Vallejo	24	EU	(Spain) Cádiz	Transfer	Summer	2024	€5,500,000	
13	GK	(Netherlands)	Jasper Cillessen	30	EU	(Spain) Barcelona	Transfer	Summer	2024	€35,000,000	
11	MF	(Russia)	Denis Cheryshev	28	EU	(Spain) Villarreal	Transfer	Summer	2022	€6,000,000	
22	FW	(Uruguay)	Maxi Gómez	23	Non-EU	(Spain) Celta Vigo	Transfer	Summer	2024	€14,500,000^{**}	
4	DF	(France)	Eliaquim Mangala	35	EU	(England) Manchester City	Transfer	Summer	2021	Free	
3	DF	(Spain)	Jaume Costa	31	EU	(Spain) Villarreal	Loan	Summer		season loan	
2	DF	(Portugal)	Thierry Correia	20	EU	(Portugal) Sporting CP	Transfer	Summer		€12,000,000	
	DF	(Spain)	Toni Lato	22	EU	(Netherlands) PSV Eindhoven	Loan Return	Winter		Free	
	MF	(Italy)	Alessandro Florenzi	28	EU	(Italy) Roma	Loan	Winter		Free	

Total spend: €76,000,000

=== Out ===
No.	Pos.	Nat.	Name	Age	EU	Moving to	Type	Transfer window	Transfer fee	Source
4	DF	(Argentina)	Facundo Roncaglia	39	EU	(Spain) Celta Vigo	Loan	Summer	N/A	
13	GK	(Brazil)	Neto	37	EU	(Spain) Barcelona	Transfer	Summer	€26,000,000	
	DF	(Portugal)	Rúben Vezo	32	EU	(Spain) Levante	Transfer	Summer	€6,000,000	
	FW	(Italy)	Simone Zaza	35	EU	(Italy) Torino	Transfer	Summer	€12,000,000	
22	DF	(Spain)	Santi Mina	30	EU	(Spain) Celta Vigo	Transfer	Summer	€0^{**}	
	DF	(Spain)	Jorge Sáenz	29	EU	(Spain) Celta Vigo	Loan	Summer	N/A^{**}	
	DF	(Colombia)	Jeison Murillo	31	Non-EU	(Italy) Sampdoria	Loan	Summer	€2,000,000^{***}	
	DF	(Tunisia)	Aymen Abdennour	37	Non-EU	(Turkey) Kayserispor	Transfer	Summer	Free	
	MF	(Spain)	Nacho Gil	31	EU	(Spain) Ponferradina	Transfer	Summer	Free	
15	DF	(Spain)	Toni Lato	28	EU	(Netherlands) PSV Eindhoven	Loan	Summer	N/A	
	MF	(Spain)	Fran Villalba	28	EU	(England) Birmingham City	Transfer	Summer	Free	
	MF	(Spain)	Jason	32	EU	(Spain) Getafe	Loan	Summer	N/A	
	DF	(Spain)	Salva Ruiz	31	EU	(Spain) Deportivo La Coruña	Transfer	Summer	Free	
	MF	(Spain)	Álvaro Medrán	32	EU		Contract terminated	Summer	Free	
	MF	(Spain)	Toni Lato	28	EU	(Spain) Osasuna	Loan	Winter	Free	

Total income: €46,000,000
Net income: -€30,000,000

^{**}Valencia signed Maxi Gómez for €14,500,000 with Mina and Sáenz joining Celta as part of the deal. Celta have a buy option on Sáenz, who joins on loan for 2 seasons, with Valencia retaining a buy back option in the event that the buy option is exercised.

^{***}Murillo joins Sampdoria on loan for 1 season, with the club having an obligation to buy him for €13,000,000 at the end of the loan.

== Pre-season and friendlies ==
Win Draw Loss

20 July 2019 Swiss training	Monaco (France)	1–0	(Spain) Valencia	Lens, Switzerland
17:00 CEST (UTC+2)	Foster 38'	Monaco Tribune		Stadium: Stade du Christ-Roi

23 July 2019 Swiss training	Sion (Switzerland)	0–3	(Spain) Valencia	Sion, Switzerland
18:45 CEST (UTC+2)		MARCA Report	Gómez 13'; Rodrigo 40'; Jiménez 72'	Stadium: Stade Tourbillon

28 July 2019 Troféu Cinco Violinos	Sporting Lisbon (Portugal)	1–2	(Spain) Valencia	Lisbon, Portugal
19:00 WEST (UTC+1)	Dost 5'; Fernandes (yellow card) 54'	Report	Kondogbia 9'; Gameiro 66'; Gabriel (yellow card) 71'	Stadium: Estádio José Alvalade; Attendance: 32,154; Referee: João Pinheiro (Portugal)

2 August 2019 Friendly (Bruno Testimonial Match)	Brighton & Hove Albion (England)	2–1	(Spain) Valencia	Falmer, England
19:00 BST (UTC+1)	Murray 39' (pen.); Duffy 87'	Report	Rodrigo 28'	Stadium: Falmer Stadium; Attendance: 16,217; Referee: David Coote (England)

4 August 2019 Friendly	Bayer 04 Leverkusen (Germany)	1–2	(Spain) Valencia	Leverkusen, Germany
14:00 CEST (UTC+2)	Demirbay (yellow card) 9'; Dragović (red card) 21'; Havertz 27' (pen.)	Report	Gameiro 10' (pen.), 57'; Kondogbia (yellow card) 37'; Parejo (yellow card) 67'	Stadium: BayArena; Referee: Sven Weschitzki (Germany)

10 August 2019 Orange Trophy	Valencia (Spain)	1–1 (6–7 p)	(Italy) Inter Milan	Valencia, Spain
21:30 CEST (UTC+2)	Wass (yellow card) 25'; Soler 38'	Report	Škriniar (yellow card) 52'; Politano 82' (pen.)	Stadium: Mestalla; Attendance: 44,079; Referee: José María Sánchez Martínez (Spain)
	Penalties
	Lee Kang-in (penalty scored); Ferran (penalty scored); Cheryshev (penalty scored); Gómez (penalty scored); Parejo (penalty scored); Kondogbia (penalty scored); Garay (penalty missed)		(penalty scored) Gagliardini; (penalty scored) Vecino; (penalty scored) Dimarco; (penalty scored) Esposito; (penalty scored) Longo; (penalty scored) Asamoah; (penalty scored) Bastoni

== Competitions ==
Win Draw Loss

=== Overview ===
Competition	First match	Last match	Starting round	Final position	Record							
Competition	First match	Last match	Starting round	Final position	Pld	W	D	L	GF	GA	GD	Win %
La Liga	17 August 2019	19 July 2020	Matchday 1	9th	38	14	11	13	46	53	−7	36.84
Copa del Rey	22 January 2020	4 February 2020	Round of 32	Quarter-finals	3	1	1	1	2	2	+0	33.33
Supercopa de España	8 January 2020		Semi-finals	Semi-finals	1	0	0	1	1	3	−2	0.00
Champions League	17 September 2019	10 March 2020	Group stage	Round of 16	8	3	2	3	13	15	−2	37.50
Total					50	18	14	18	62	73	−11	36.00

Last updated: 19 July 2020
Source: Soccerway

=== La Liga ===
==== League table ====
Pos	Team	Pld	W	D	L	GF	GA	GD	Pts	Qualification or relegation
7	Granada	38	16	8	14	52	45	+7	56	Qualification for the Europa League second qualifying round (Note: The 2020 Copa del Rey Final was postponed due to the COVID-19 pandemic in Spain and could not be completed by the UEFA registration deadline of 3 August 2020, so the fifth- and sixth-placed teams in the 2019–20 La Liga, Villarreal and Real Sociedad, entered the 2020–21 UEFA Europa League at the group stage, and the seventh-placed team, Granada, entered at the second qualifying round.)
8	Getafe	38	14	12	12	43	37	+6	54	
9	Valencia	38	14	11	13	46	53	−7	53	
10	Osasuna	38	13	13	12	46	54	−8	52	
11	Athletic Bilbao	38	13	12	13	41	38	+3	51	

Source: La Liga, Soccerway
Rules for classification: 1) Points; 2) Head-to-head points; 3) Head-to-head goal difference; 4) Goal difference; 5) Goals scored; 6) Fair-play points (Note: Head-to-head record is used only after all the matches between the teams in question have been played)

==== Results summary ====
Overall								Home						Away					
Pld	W	D	L	GF	GA	GD	Pts	W	D	L	GF	GA	GD	W	D	L	GF	GA	GD
38	14	11	13	46	53	−7	53	11	7	1	29	16	+13	3	4	12	17	37	−20

Last updated: 19 July 2020.
Source: La Liga

==== Results by round ====
Round	1	2	3	4	5	6	7	8	9	10	11	12	13	14	15	16	17	18	19	20	21	22	23	24	25	26	27	28	29	30	31	32	33	34	35	36	37	38
Ground	H	A	H	A	H	H	A	H	A	A	H	A	H	A	H	A	H	A	H	A	H	H	A	H	A	H	A	H	A	H	A	A	H	A	H	A	H	A
Result	D	L	W	L	D	D	W	W	D	L	D	W	W	L	W	W	D	D	W	L	W	W	L	D	L	W	D	D	L	W	L	L	L	D	W	L	W	L
Position	11	18	10	13	12	13	9	8	10	12	12	13	9	10	8	8	8	8	6	7	7	5	7	7	8	7	7	7	8	8	8	8	10	9	8	9	8	9

Updated to match(es) played on 19 July 2020. Source: La Liga
A = Away; H = Home; W = Win; D = Draw; L = Loss

==== Matches ====
The La Liga schedule was announced on 4 July 2019.

17 August 2019 1	Valencia	1–1	Real Sociedad	Valencia
19:00 CEST (UTC+2)	Gameiro 58'; Coquelin (yellow card) 63' (yellow-red card) 90+10'; Cheryshev (yellow card) 90+5'; Garay (yellow card) 90+8'	Report	Ødegaard (yellow card) 29'; Merino (yellow card) 36'; Zaldúa (yellow card) 42'; Le Normand (yellow card) 57'; Oyarzabal 90+11' (pen.)	Stadium: Mestalla; Attendance: 41,846; Referee: Jesús Gil Manzano

24 August 2019 2	Celta Vigo	1–0	Valencia	Vigo
21:00 CEST (UTC+2)	Fernández 15'; Olaza (yellow card) 48'	Report	Gayà (yellow card) 62'; Parejo (yellow card) 90+1'	Stadium: Balaídos; Attendance: 20,034; Referee: Alejandro Hernández Hernández

1 September 2019 3	Valencia	2–0	Mallorca	Valencia
17:00 CEST (UTC+2)	Parejo 43' (pen.), 57' (pen.)	Report	Junior (yellow card) 53'	Stadium: Mestalla; Attendance: 40,544; Referee: Javier Alberola Rojas

14 September 2019 4	Barcelona	5–2	Valencia	Barcelona
21:00 CEST (UTC+2)	Fati 2'; De Jong 7'; Piqué 51'; Alba (yellow card) 53'; Suárez 61', 82'	Report	Gameiro 27'; Rodrigo (yellow card) 31'; Lee Kang-in (yellow card) 69'; Gómez (yellow card) 78', (goal) 90+2'; Cheryshev (yellow card) 84'	Stadium: Camp Nou; Attendance: 81,617; Referee: José María Sánchez Martínez

22 September 2019 5	Valencia	1–1	Leganés	Valencia
16:00 CEST (UTC+2)	Parejo 21' (pen.); Kondogbia (yellow card) 59'; Torres (yellow card) 85'; Gabriel (yellow card) 90+1'	Report	Recio (yellow card) 23'; Óscar 35'; Siovas (yellow card) 41'; Soriano (yellow card) 86'; Pérez (yellow card) 88'	Stadium: Mestalla; Attendance: 39,014; Referee: Xavier Estrada Fernández

25 September 2019 6	Valencia	3–3	Getafe	Valencia
20:00 CEST (UTC+2)	Gómez 30', 34', (yellow card) 31'; Lee Kang-in 39'	Report	Mata 1', (yellow card) 41'; Nyom (yellow card) 14'; Jason (yellow card) 45+2', (goal) 66'; Djené (yellow card) 56'; Ángel 69'	Stadium: Mestalla; Attendance: 37,814; Referee: José Luis Munuera Montero

28 September 2019 7	Athletic Bilbao	0–1	Valencia	Bilbao
13:00 CEST (UTC+2)	López (yellow card) 50'; Aduriz (yellow card) 77'	Report	Cheryshev (yellow card) 20', (goal) 27'; Rodrigo (yellow card) 34'; Diakhaby (yellow card) 46'; Cillessen (yellow card) 88'; Wass (yellow card) 90+5'	Stadium: San Mamés; Attendance: 42,420; Referee: Mario Melero López

5 October 2019 8	Valencia	2–1	Alavés	Valencia
18:30 CEST (UTC+2)	Wass (yellow card) 14'; Gómez 27'; Parejo 80' (pen.)	Report	Duarte (yellow card) 15'; García (yellow card) 15'; Sivera (yellow card) 82'; Pérez 89'	Stadium: Mestalla; Attendance: 38,943; Referee: Eduardo Prieto Iglesias

19 October 2019 9	Atlético Madrid	1–1	Valencia	Madrid
16:00 CEST (UTC+2)	Partey (yellow card) 29'; Costa 36' (pen.); Félix (yellow card) 44'	Report	Cheryshev (yellow card) 39'; Parejo 82'; Lee Kang-in (red card) 90+1'	Stadium: Wanda Metropolitano; Attendance: 61,603; Referee: Adrián Cordero Vega

27 October 2019 10	Osasuna	3–1	Valencia	Pamplona
21:00 CET (UTC+1)	Oier 34', (yellow card) 55'; R. García 48'; Estupiñán 80'	Report	Rodrigo 14', (red card) 29'; Cheryshev (yellow card) 42'	Stadium: El Sadar Stadium; Attendance: 14,976; Referee: Santiago Jaime Latre

30 October 2019 11	Valencia	1–1	Sevilla	Valencia
19:00 CET (UTC+1)	Torres (yellow card) 45+2'; Soler (yellow card) 45+5'; Garay (yellow card) 52'; Gabriel (yellow card) 68'; Sobrino 81'; Parejo (yellow card) 90'; Lee Kang-in (yellow card) 90+4'	Report	Jordán (yellow card) 32'; Ocampos (yellow card) 45+1', (goal) 45+3'; Fernando (yellow card) 74'	Stadium: Mestalla; Attendance: 37,881; Referee: Carlos del Cerro Grande

2 November 2019 12	Espanyol	1–2	Valencia	Cornellà de Llobregat
13:00 CET (UTC+1)	Roca 31' (pen.)	Report	Kondogbia (yellow card) 30'; Parejo 69' (pen.); Gómez 80'	Stadium: RCDE Stadium; Attendance: 18,428; Referee: Valentín Pizarro Gómez

9 November 2019 13	Valencia	2–0	Granada	Valencia
16:00 CET (UTC+1)	Wass 74'; Torres 90+7'	Report	Gonalons (yellow card) 39'; Azeez (yellow card) 44'; Quini (yellow card) 78'; Montoro (yellow card) 89'; Herrera (yellow card) 90+2'	Stadium: Mestalla; Attendance: 40,038; Referee: Xavier Estrada Fernández

23 November 2019 14	Real Betis	2–1	Valencia	Seville
16:00 CET (UTC+1)	González (yellow card) 32'; Joaquín 37'; Moreno (yellow card) 64'; Canales 90+4'	Report	Gómez 32'; Wass (yellow card) 57'; Gayà (yellow card) 90+3'	Stadium: Estadio Benito Villamarín; Attendance: 45,562; Referee: Ricardo de Burgos Bengoetxea

30 November 2019 15	Valencia	2–1	Villarreal	Valencia
21:00 CET (UTC+1)	Rodrigo 49'; Torres 70'; Parejo (yellow card) 75'	Report	Albiol (yellow card) 17'; Zambo Anguissa 54'; Gerard (yellow card) 55'	Stadium: Mestalla; Attendance: 38,988; Referee: César Soto Grado

7 December 2019 16	Levante	2–4	Valencia	Valencia
18:30 CET (UTC+1)	Coke (yellow card) 7'; Morales (yellow card) 9'; Roger 11', 20' (pen.); Rochina (yellow card) 24'; Eliseo (yellow card) 44' (yellow-red card) 75'	Report	Coquelin (yellow card) 31'; Roger 45+3' (o.g.); Gameiro 57', 59'; Torres (yellow card) 86', (goal) 88'	Stadium: Estadi Ciutat de València; Attendance: 23,167; Referee: David Medié Jiménez

15 December 2019 17	Valencia	1–1	Real Madrid	Valencia
21:00 CET (UTC+1)	Soler (yellow card) 38', (goal) 78'	Report	Carvajal (yellow card) 77'; Jović (yellow card) 90+1'; Benzema 90+5'	Stadium: Mestalla; Attendance: 44,230; Referee: José María Sánchez Martínez

21 December 2019 18	Valladolid	1–1	Valencia	Valladolid
21:00 CET (UTC+1)	Guardiola 83'	Report	Soler (yellow card) 34'; Coquelin (yellow card) 81'; Parejo (yellow card) 90'; Vallejo 90+4'	Stadium: Estadio José Zorrilla; Attendance: 16,295; Referee: Valentín Pizarro Gómez

4 January 2020 19	Valencia	1–0	Eibar	Valencia
13:00 CET (UTC+1)	Gómez 27'; Wass (yellow card) 77'	Report	Charles (yellow card) 62'; Oliveira (yellow card) 84' (yellow-red card) 90+1'	Stadium: Mestalla; Attendance: 39,702; Referee: Alejandro Hernández Hernández

19 January 2020 20	Mallorca	4–1	Valencia	Palma de Mallorca
12:00 CET (UTC+1)	Raíllo 7', (yellow card) 38'; Budimir 22', 41'; Sevilla (yellow card) 55'; Reina (yellow card) 60'; Rodríguez 79'; Kubo (yellow card) 81'	Report	Parejo (yellow card) 6' (yellow-red card) 51'; Coquelin (yellow card) 12'; Torres 82', (yellow card) 87'	Stadium: Estadi de Son Moix; Attendance: 9,856; Referee: Mario Melero López

25 January 2020 21	Valencia	2–0	Barcelona	Valencia
16:00 CET (UTC+1)	Gómez 48', 77'; Coquelin (yellow card) 54'	Report	Piqué (yellow card) 10'; Umtiti (yellow card) 43'; Busquets (yellow card) 52'	Stadium: Mestalla; Attendance: 45,882; Referee: Jesús Gil Manzano

1 February 2020 22	Valencia	1–0	Celta Vigo	Valencia
21:00 CET (UTC+1)	Gabriel (yellow card) 20'; Wass (yellow card) 33'; Florenzi (yellow card) 50'; Soler 77'; Gómez (yellow card) 80'; Coquelin (yellow card) 90+1'; Doménech (yellow card) 90+3'	Report	Kevin (yellow card) 40'; Rafinha (yellow card) 65'; Sisto (yellow card) 89'	Stadium: Mestalla; Attendance: 39,637; Referee: Pablo González Fuertes

8 February 2020 23	Getafe	3–0	Valencia	Getafe
16:00 CET (UTC+1)	Nyom (yellow card) 24'; Molina 58', 67'; Suárez (yellow card) 64'; Arambarri (yellow card) 75'; Mata 87'; Etxeita (yellow card) 90+6'	Report	Torres (yellow card) 63'; Gabriel (yellow card) 64'; Gómez (yellow card) 65'; Diakhaby (yellow card) 71'; Florenzi (red card) 78'	Stadium: Coliseum Alfonso Pérez; Attendance: 13,070; Referee: Ricardo de Burgos Bengoetxea

14 February 2020 24	Valencia	2–2	Atlético Madrid	Valencia
21:00 CET (UTC+1)	Gabriel 40', (yellow card) 55'; Kondogbia 59'; Mangala (yellow card) 67'; Gómez (yellow card) 79'	Report	Llorente 15'; Lodi (yellow card) 26'; Partey 43'; Vrsaljko (yellow card) 58'	Stadium: Mestalla; Attendance: 42,297; Referee: David Medié Jiménez

22 February 2020 25	Real Sociedad	3–0	Valencia	San Sebastián
18:30 CET (UTC+1)	Merino 12', (yellow card) 38'; Monreal 45+1'; Januzaj 48'	Report	Costa (yellow card) 88'	Stadium: Anoeta; Attendance: 31,381; Referee: José Luis González González

29 February 2020 26	Valencia	2–1	Real Betis	Valencia
16:00 CET (UTC+1)	Kondogbia (yellow card) 35'; Gameiro 60'; Gayà (yellow card) 87'; Parejo 89'	Report	Moreno (yellow card) 32'; Emerson (yellow card) 76'; Guardado (yellow card) 80'; Loren 90+3'	Stadium: Mestalla; Attendance: 37,418; Referee: Adrián Cordero Vega

6 March 2020 27	Alavés	1–1	Valencia	Vitoria-Gasteiz
21:00 CET (UTC+1)	Pérez (yellow card) 36'; Navarro (yellow card) 39'; Ely (yellow card) 42'; Joselu (yellow card) 62'; Édgar 73', (yellow card) 84'	Report	Parejo 34'; Kondogbia (yellow card) 35'; Gayà (yellow card) 61'; Diakhaby (yellow card) 90'	Stadium: Mendizorrotza Stadium; Attendance: 14,083; Referee: Jesús Gil Manzano

12 June 2020 28	Valencia	1–1	Levante	Valencia
22:00 CEST (UTC+2)	Guillamón (yellow card) 43'; Rodrigo 90'	Report	Roger (yellow card) 45+2' (yellow-red card) 74'; Miramón (yellow card) 54'; Vukčević (yellow card) 72'; Melero 90+8' (pen.)	Stadium: Mestalla; Attendance: 0 Referee: Javier Alberola Rojas
Note: The match was originally scheduled for 14 March, but was postponed due to the COVID-19 pandemic, and rescheduled to 12 June. It was played behind closed doors.

18 June 2020 29	Real Madrid	3–0	Valencia	Madrid
22:00 CEST (UTC+2)	Benzema 61', 86'; Asensio 74'	Report	Gayà (yellow card) 24'; Guillamón (yellow card) 84'; Lee Kang-in (red card) 89'	Stadium: Alfredo di Stéfano; Attendance: 0 Referee: José María Sánchez Martínez
Note: The match was originally scheduled for 21 March, but was postponed due to the 2020 coronavirus pandemic, and rescheduled to 18 June. It was played behind closed doors.

21 June 2020 30	Valencia	2–0	Osasuna	Valencia
19:30 CEST (UTC+2)	Guedes 12', (yellow card) 27'; Rodrigo 35'	Report	Estupiñán (yellow card) 65'; R. García (yellow card) 85'	Stadium: Mestalla; Attendance: 0 Referee: David Medié Jiménez
Note: The match was originally scheduled for 5 April, but was postponed due to the 2020 coronavirus pandemic, and rescheduled to 21 June. It was played behind closed doors.

25 June 2020 31	Eibar	1–0	Valencia	Eibar
19:30 CEST (UTC+2)	Kondogbia 16' (o.g.); Escalante (yellow card) 26'; Charles (yellow card) 74'; Enrich (yellow card) 81'; Orellana (yellow card) 83'	Report	Mangala (yellow card) 59' (yellow-red card) 89'	Stadium: Ipurua Municipal Stadium; Attendance: 0 Referee: Santiago Jaime Latre
Note: The match was originally scheduled for 12 April, but was postponed due to the 2020 coronavirus pandemic, and rescheduled to 25 June. It was played behind closed doors.

28 June 2020 32	Villarreal	2–0	Valencia	Villarreal
17:00 CEST (UTC+2)	Alcácer 14'; Gerard 44'	Report	Guillamón (yellow card) 43'; Costa (yellow card) 50'	Stadium: Estadio de la Cerámica; Attendance: 0 Referee: José Luis González González
Note: The match was originally scheduled for 22 April, but was postponed due to the 2020 coronavirus pandemic, and rescheduled to 28 June. It was played behind closed doors.

1 July 2020 33	Valencia	0–2	Athletic Bilbao	Valencia
19:30 CEST (UTC+2)	Diakhaby (yellow card) 83'	Report	R. García 13', 47'	Stadium: Mestalla; Attendance: 0 Referee: Xavier Estrada Fernández
Note: The match was originally scheduled for 26 April, but was postponed due to the 2020 coronavirus pandemic, and rescheduled to 1 July. It was played behind closed doors.

4 July 2020 34	Granada	2–2	Valencia	Granada
22:00 CEST (UTC+2)	Foulquier (yellow card) 45+1'; Fernández 61' (pen.); Vico 86'; Herrera (yellow card) 90+5'	Report	Vallejo 63'; Guedes 68', (yellow card) 90'; Wass (yellow card) 90+7'	Stadium: Nuevo Los Cármenes; Attendance: 0 Referee: Adrián Cordero Vega
Note: The match was originally scheduled for 3 May, but was postponed due to the 2020 coronavirus pandemic, and rescheduled to 4 July. It was played behind closed doors.

7 July 2020 35	Valencia	2–1	Valladolid	Valencia
19:30 CEST (UTC+2)	Gómez 30'; Guerrero (yellow card) 72'; Kondogbia (yellow card) 75'; Lee Kang-in 89'; Guedes (yellow card) 90+2'	Report	García 47'	Stadium: Mestalla; Attendance: 0 Referee: Ricardo de Burgos Bengoetxea
Note: The match was originally scheduled for 10 May, but was postponed due to the 2020 coronavirus pandemic, and rescheduled to 7 July. It was played behind closed doors.

12 July 2020 36	Leganés	1–0	Valencia	Leganés
19:30 CEST (UTC+2)	Pérez 18' (pen.); Silva (red card) 54'; Mesa (yellow card) 70'; Ruibal (yellow card) 80'; Awaziem (yellow card) 90+2'; Recio (yellow card) 90+4'	Report	Wass (yellow card) 9'	Stadium: Estadio Municipal de Butarque; Attendance: 0 Referee: Mario Melero López
Note: The match was originally scheduled for 13 May, but was postponed due to the 2020 coronavirus pandemic, and rescheduled to 12 July. It was played behind closed doors.

16 July 2020 37	Valencia	1–0	Espanyol	Valencia
21:00 CEST (UTC+2)	Gameiro 17'; Diakhaby (yellow card) 59'; Coquelin (yellow card) 80'; Costa (red card) 90+2'	Report	Pipa (yellow card) 39'; De Tomás (yellow card) 65'; Vilà (yellow card) 69'; Espinosa (yellow card) 81'	Stadium: Mestalla; Attendance: 0 Referee: Eduardo Prieto Iglesias
Note: The match was originally scheduled for 17 May, but was postponed due to the 2020 coronavirus pandemic, and rescheduled to 16 July. It was played behind closed doors.

19 July 2020 38	Sevilla	1–0	Valencia	Seville
21:00 CEST (UTC+2)	Reguilón 55'	Report	Soler (yellow card) 52'	Stadium: Ramón Sánchez Pizjuán Stadium; Attendance: 0 Referee: José Luis González González
Note: The match was originally scheduled for 24 May, but was postponed due to the 2020 coronavirus pandemic, and rescheduled to 19 July. It was played behind closed doors.

=== Copa del Rey ===
22 January 2020 Round of 32	UD Logroñés	0–1	Valencia	Logroño
21:00 CET (UTC+1)	Olaetxea (yellow card) 82'	Report	Gómez 15'; Torres (yellow card) 32'; Mangala (yellow card) 56'	Stadium: Las Gaunas; Attendance: 11,152; Referee: Adrián Cordero Vega

29 January 2020 Round of 16	Cultural Leonesa	0–0 (a.e.t.) (2–4 p)	Valencia	León
19:00 CET (UTC+1)	Montes (yellow card) 73'; Aitor (yellow card) 90+2'; Castañeda (yellow card) 105+2'; Martínez (yellow card) 118'; Pichín (yellow card) 118'	Report	Kondogbia (yellow card) 71'; Soler (yellow card) 74'	Stadium: Reino de León; Attendance: 12,448; Referee: Valentín Pizarro Gómez
	Penalties
	Menudo (penalty missed); Benito (penalty missed); Pichín (penalty scored); Montes (penalty scored)		(penalty scored) Coquelin; (penalty scored) Soler; (penalty scored) Gómez; (penalty scored) Parejo

4 February 2020 Quarter-finals	Granada	2–1	Valencia	Granada
21:00 CET (UTC+1)	Soldado 3', 90+4' (pen.), (yellow card) 53'; Gonalons (yellow card) 43'	Report	Rodrigo 40'	Stadium: Nuevo Los Cármenes; Attendance: 16,551; Referee: José Luis González González

=== Supercopa de España ===
8 January 2020 Semi-finals	Valencia	1–3	Real Madrid	Jeddah, Saudi Arabia
20:00 CET (UTC+1)	Parejo 90+2' (pen.)	Report	Kroos 15'; Isco 39'; Modrić 65'; Casemiro (yellow card) 88'	Stadium: King Abdullah Sports City; Attendance: 40,877; Referee: Jesús Gil Manzano

=== UEFA Champions League ===
==== Group stage ====
Group H

Pos	Team	Pld	W	D	L	GF	GA	GD	Pts	Qualification	VAL	CHE	AJX	LIL
1	(Spain) Valencia	6	3	2	1	9	7	+2	11 (Note: Head-to-head points: Valencia 4, Chelsea 1.)	Advance to knockout phase	—	2–2	0–3	4–1
2	(England) Chelsea	6	3	2	1	11	9	+2	11	Advance to knockout phase	0–1	—	4–4	2–1
3	(Netherlands) Ajax	6	3	1	2	12	6	+6	10	Transfer to Europa League	0–1	0–1	—	3–0
4	(France) Lille	6	0	1	5	4	14	−10	1		1–1	1–2	0–2	—

Source: UEFA
Rules for classification: Group stage tiebreakers
Notes:

17 September 2019 1	Chelsea (England)	0–1	(Spain) Valencia	London, England
21:00 CEST (UTC+2)	Jorginho (yellow card) 33'; Giroud (yellow card) 90'	Report	Coquelin (yellow card) 9'; Rodrigo 74'	Stadium: Stamford Bridge; Attendance: 39,469; Referee: Cüneyt Çakır (Turkey)

2 October 2019 2	Valencia (Spain)	0–3	(Netherlands) Ajax	Valencia, Spain
21:00 CEST (UTC+2)	Costa (yellow card) 45+1'; Lee Kang-in (yellow card) 72'; Garay (yellow card) 76'	Report	Ziyech 8'; Veltman (yellow card) 12'; Tagliafico (yellow card) 27'; Promes 34', (yellow card) 81'; Martínez (yellow card) 60'; Onana (yellow card) 62'; Van de Beek 67'; Blind (yellow card) 82'	Stadium: Mestalla; Attendance: 44,659; Referee: Daniele Orsato (Italy)

23 October 2019 3	Lille (France)	1–1	(Spain) Valencia	Villeneuve-d'Ascq, France
21:00 CEST (UTC+2)	Çelik (yellow card) 21'; Luiz Araújo (yellow card) 42'; Djaló (yellow card) 86'; Ikoné 90+5'; Gabriel (yellow card) 90+8'	Report	Cheryshev 63'; Diakhaby (yellow card) 82' (yellow-red card) 84'; Gómez (yellow card) 90+3'	Stadium: Stade Pierre-Mauroy; Attendance: 47,488; Referee: Deniz Aytekin (Germany)

5 November 2019 4	Valencia (Spain)	4–1	(France) Lille	Valencia, Spain
21:00 CET (UTC+1)	Garay (yellow card) 31'; Parejo 66' (pen.); Wass (yellow card) 67'; Soumaoro 82' (o.g.); Kondogbia 84'; Torres 90'	Report	Gabriel (yellow card) 21'; Osimhen 25'; André (yellow card) 37'; Fonte (yellow card) 65'; Bradarić (yellow card) 80'	Stadium: Mestalla; Attendance: 38,252; Referee: Sergei Karasev (Russia)

27 November 2019 5	Valencia (Spain)	2–2	(England) Chelsea	Valencia, Spain
18:55 CET (UTC+1)	Wass (yellow card) 32', (goal) 82'; Soler 40'; Garay (yellow card) 53'; Gabriel (yellow card) 87'	Report	Jorginho (yellow card) 7'; Kovačić 41'; Pulisic 50'; Azpilicueta (yellow card) 55'; Kanté (yellow card) 73'; Arrizabalaga (yellow card) 78'	Stadium: Mestalla; Attendance: 43,486; Referee: Felix Zwayer (Germany)

10 December 2019 6	Ajax (Netherlands)	0–1	(Spain) Valencia	Amsterdam, Netherlands
21:00 CET (UTC+1)	Álvarez (yellow card) 10'; Tagliafico (yellow card) 79'; Onana (yellow card) 81'; Van de Beek (yellow card) 83'; Tadić (yellow card) 90+4'	Report	Rodrigo 24'; Doménech (yellow card) 79'; Parejo (yellow card) 81'; Vallejo (yellow card) 86'; Gabriel (red card) 90+3'	Stadium: Johan Cruyff Arena; Attendance: 51,931; Referee: Clément Turpin (France)

==== Knockout phase ====
===== Round of 16 =====
19 February 2020 First leg	Atalanta (Italy)	4–1	(Spain) Valencia	Milan, Italy
21:00 CET (UTC+1)	Hateboer 16', 63', (yellow card) 79'; Iličić 42'; Freuler 57'	Report	Cheryshev 66'	Stadium: San Siro; Attendance: 44,236; Referee: Michael Oliver (England)

10 March 2020 Second leg	Valencia (Spain)	3–4 (4–8 agg.)	(Italy) Atalanta	Valencia, Spain
21:00 CET (UTC+1)	Gameiro 21', 51'; Coquelin (yellow card) 33'; Diakhaby (yellow card) 42'; Kondogbia (yellow card) 58'; Wass (yellow card) 64'; Torres 67'	Report	Iličić 3' (pen.), 43' (pen.), 71', 82'; Freuler (yellow card) 86'	Stadium: Mestalla; Attendance: 0 Referee: Ovidiu Hațegan (Romania)

== Statistics ==
=== Appearances and goals ===
Last updated on the end of the season

No.	Pos	Nat	Player	Total		La Liga		Copa del Rey		Supercopa de España		Champions League	
No.	Pos	Nat	Player	Apps	Goals	Apps	Goals	Apps	Goals	Apps	Goals	Apps	Goals
Goalkeepers
1	GK	(Spain) ESP	Jaume Doménech	21	0	14+1	0	3	0	1	0	2	0
13	GK	(Netherlands) NED	Jasper Cillessen	30	0	24	0	0	0	0	0	6	0
Defenders
2	DF	(Portugal) POR	Thierry Correia	7	0	3+1	0	2	0	0	0	0+1	0
3	DF	(Spain) ESP	Jaume Costa	25	0	15+4	0	3	0	0	0	3	0
4	DF	(France) FRA	Eliaquim Mangala	11	0	8	0	1	0	0	0	1+1	0
5	DF	(Brazil) BRA	Gabriel	42	1	31+2	1	2	0	1	0	6	0
12	DF	(France) FRA	Mouctar Diakhaby	29	0	15+6	0	3	0	0	0	4+1	0
14	DF	(Spain) ESP	José Gayà	32	0	23+1	0	0+1	0	1	0	6	0
21	DF	(Italy) ITA	Cristiano Piccini	2	0	1+1	0	0	0	0	0	0	0
25	DF	(Italy) ITA	Alessandro Florenzi	14	0	9+3	0	0+1	0	0	0	0+1	0
31	DF	(Spain) ESP	Adrià Guerrero	2	0	1+1	0	0	0	0	0	0	0
33	DF	(Spain) ESP	Hugo Guillamón	6	0	5+1	0	0	0	0	0	0	0
Midfielders
6	MF	(Central African Republic) CAF	Geoffrey Kondogbia	34	2	21+6	1	1	0	1	0	5	1
8	MF	(Spain) ESP	Carlos Soler	37	3	24+4	2	3	0	1	0	4+1	1
10	MF	(Spain) ESP	Dani Parejo	47	10	35	8	3	0	1	1	8	1
16	MF	(South Korea) KOR	Lee Kang-in	24	2	3+14	2	2	0	0	0	1+4	0
17	MF	(France) FRA	Francis Coquelin	36	0	21+5	0	1+2	0	1	0	5+1	0
18	MF	(Denmark) DEN	Daniel Wass	45	2	30+5	1	1	0	1	0	8	1
20	MF	(Spain) ESP	Ferran Torres	44	6	26+8	4	3	0	1	0	5+1	2
34	MF	(Spain) ESP	Vicente Esquerdo	4	0	0+3	0	1	0	0	0	0	0
Forwards
7	FW	(Portugal) POR	Gonçalo Guedes	25	2	14+7	2	0+1	0	0	0	2+1	0
9	FW	(France) FRA	Kevin Gameiro	39	8	17+12	6	1+1	0	1	0	4+3	2
11	FW	(Russia) RUS	Denis Cheryshev	31	3	9+15	1	0	0	0+1	0	3+3	2
15	FW	(Spain) ESP	Manu Vallejo	13	2	3+8	2	0	0	0	0	0+2	0
19	FW	(Spain) ESP	Rodrigo	34	7	23+4	4	1	1	0	0	6	2
22	FW	(Uruguay) URU	Maxi Gómez	43	11	25+8	10	2+1	1	0+1	0	5+1	0
23	FW	(Spain) ESP	Rubén Sobrino	17	1	1+12	1	0+3	0	0+1	0	0	0
Players who have made an appearance or had a squad number this season but have been loaned out or transferred
15	MF	(Spain) ESP	Jason	0	0	0	0	0	0	0	0	0	0
24	DF	(Argentina) ARG	Ezequiel Garay	23	0	17	0	0	0	1	0	4+1	0
