= Fofo =

Fofo may refer to:

- Adolfo Enríquez García (b. 1990), Spanish footballer known as Fofo.
- Egidio Armelloni (b. 1909), Italian gymnast nicknamed Fofò
- A character from the puzzle game Baba Is You
- Fofo County in American Samoa
