= CD El Álamo =

Association football club in Spain

El Álamo
- Full name: Club Deportivo; El Álamo
- Founded: 1974
- Ground: Estadio Facundo Rivas; El Álamo, Community of Madrid, Spain
- Capacity: 1,500
- Chairman: (Spain) David Orgáz Rufo
- Manager: (Spain) Emilio López Amado
- League: Primera Autonómica de Aficionados – Group 2
- 2024–25: Tercera Federación – Group 7, 18th of 18 (relegated)
Home colours	Away colours

Club Deportivo El Álamo is a football team based in El Álamo in the autonomous Community of Madrid, Spain. Founded in 1974, it plays in the Primera Autonómica de Aficionados – Group 2, holding home matches at Estadio Facundo Rivas, which has a capacity of 1,500 spectators.

It has played several seasons in the Tercera División; last time it finished 15th in the 2019-20 season.

== Season to season ==
Season	Tier	Division	Place	Copa del Rey
1974–75	8	3ª Reg.	6th	
1975–76	7	3ª Reg. P.	11th	
1976–77	7	3ª Reg. P.	8th	
1977–78	8	3ª Reg. P.	3rd	
1978–79	7	2ª Reg.	6th	
1979–80	7	2ª Reg.	7th	
1980–81	7	2ª Reg.	8th	
1981–82	7	2ª Reg.	17th	
1982–83	7	2ª Reg.	6th	
1983–84	7	2ª Reg.	1st	
1984–85	6	1ª Reg.	2nd	
1985–86	5	Reg. Pref.	17th	
1986–87	5	Reg. Pref.	8th	
1987–88	5	Reg. Pref.	14th	
1988–89	5	Reg. Pref.	13th	
1989–90	5	Reg. Pref.	3rd	
1990–91	5	Reg. Pref.	2nd	
1991–92	5	Reg. Pref.	1st	
1992–93	4	3ª	16th	
1993–94	4	3ª	14th	

Season	Tier	Division	Place	Copa del Rey
1994–95	4	3ª	22nd	
1995–96	5	Reg. Pref.	2nd	
1996–97	5	Reg. Pref.	4th	
1997–98	5	Reg. Pref.	10th	
1998–99	5	Reg. Pref.	9th	
1999–2000	5	Reg. Pref.	9th	
2000–01	5	Reg. Pref.	6th	
2001–02	5	Reg. Pref.	14th	
2002–03	5	Reg. Pref.	11th	
2003–04	5	Reg. Pref.	2nd	
2004–05	4	3ª	20th	
2005–06	5	Reg. Pref.	15th	
2006–07	6	1ª Reg.	3rd	
2007–08	5	Reg. Pref.	11th	
2008–09	5	Reg. Pref.	4th	
2009–10	5	Pref.	18th	
2010–11	6	1ª Afic.	1st	
2011–12	5	Pref.	18th	
2012–13	6	1ª Afic.	5th	
2013–14	6	1ª Afic.	5th	

Season	Tier	Division	Place	Copa del Rey
2014–15	6	1ª Afic.	2nd	
2015–16	5	Pref.	4th	
2016–17	5	Pref.	3rd	
2017–18	4	3ª	18th	
2018–19	5	Pref.	1st	
2019–20	4	3ª	15th	First round
2020–21	4	3ª	9th / 6th	
2021–22	6	Pref.	8th	
2022–23	6	Pref.	5th	
2023–24	6	Pref.	3rd	
2024–25	5	3ª Fed.	18th	
2025–26	6	1ª Aut.		

- 8 seasons in Tercera División
- 1 season in Tercera Federación

== Ground ==
El Álamo's home ground is Estadio Facundo Rivas with a capacity of 1,500 seats.

== Notable players ==
- (Equatorial Guinea) Óscar (2010~)
- (Equatorial Guinea) (Spain) Dani Evuy (2007~2008)
- (Spain) Rubén Anuarbe (1999~2001)
