= CD Pontellas =

Association football club in Spain

Pontellas
- Full name: Club Deportivo Pontellas
- Founded: 1962; 64 years ago
- Stadium: Campo de Fútbol de San Campio
- Capacity: 1,500
- President: Marta Costas
- Head coach: Pablo Préstamo
- League: Tercera Futgal – Vigo Group 2
- 2025–26: Segunda Futgal – Vigo, 3rd of 17
| Home colours | Away colours |

Club Deportivo Pontellas is a Spanish football team located in Pontellas, municipality O Porriño in the province of Pontevedra in the autonomous community of Galicia. Founded in 1962 it currently plays in Tercera Futgal – Vigo Group 2, holding home matches at Campo de Fútbol de San Campio with a capacity of 1,500 spectators.

== History ==
CD Pontellas was founded in 1962. The club was promoted to the Tercera División for the first time in 2019.

== Season to season ==
| Season | Tier | Division | Place | Copa del Rey |
|---|---|---|---|---|
| 1968–69 | 6 | 2ª Reg. | 10th | |
| 1969–70 | 6 | 2ª Reg. | 11th | |
| 1970–71 | 6 | 2ª Reg. | 8th | |
| 1971–72 | 6 | 2ª Reg. | 5th | |
| 1972–73 | 6 | 2ª Reg. | 6th | |
| 1973–74 | 6 | 2ª Reg. | 9th | |
| 1974–75 | 6 | 2ª Reg. | 5th | |
| 1975–76 | 6 | 2ª Reg. | 9th | |
| 1976–77 | 6 | 2ª Reg. | 12th | |
| 1977–78 | 7 | 2ª Reg. | 7th | |
| 1978–79 | 8 | 3ª Reg. | 11th | |
| 1979–80 | 8 | 3ª Reg. | 12th | |
| 1980–81 | 8 | 3ª Reg. | 12th | |
| 1981–82 | 8 | 3ª Reg. | 3rd | |
| 1982–83 | 8 | 3ª Reg. | 11th | |
| 1983–84 | 8 | 3ª Reg. | 1st | |
| 1984–85 | 7 | 2ª Reg. | 3rd | |
| 1985–86 | 6 | 1ª Reg. | 12th | |
| 1986–87 | 6 | 1ª Reg. | 16th | |
| 1987–88 | 6 | 1ª Reg. | 1st | |

| Season | Tier | Division | Place | Copa del Rey |
|---|---|---|---|---|
| 1988–89 | 6 | 1ª Reg. | 7th | |
| 1989–90 | 6 | 1ª Reg. | 16th | |
| 1990–91 | 6 | 1ª Reg. | 16th | |
| 1991–92 | 7 | 2ª Reg. | 3rd | |
| 1992–93 | 6 | 1ª Reg. | 6th | |
| 1993–94 | 6 | 1ª Reg. | 3rd | |
| 1994–95 | 6 | 1ª Reg. | 1st | |
| 1995–96 | 5 | Reg. Pref. | 7th | |
| 1996–97 | 5 | Reg. Pref. | 2nd | |
| 1997–98 | 5 | Reg. Pref. | 9th | |
| 1998–99 | 5 | Reg. Pref. | 15th | |
| 1999–2000 | 5 | Reg. Pref. | 13th | |
| 2000–01 | 5 | Reg. Pref. | 8th | |
| 2001–02 | 5 | Reg. Pref. | 5th | |
| 2002–03 | 5 | Reg. Pref. | 6th | |
| 2003–04 | 5 | Reg. Pref. | 4th | |
| 2004–05 | 5 | Reg. Pref. | 16th | |
| 2005–06 | 6 | 1ª Reg. | 2nd | |
| 2006–07 | 5 | Pref. Aut. | 7th | |
| 2007–08 | 5 | Pref. Aut. | 16th | |

| Season | Tier | Division | Place | Copa del Rey |
|---|---|---|---|---|
| 2008–09 | 5 | Pref. Aut. | 11th | |
| 2009–10 | 5 | Pref. Aut. | 8th | |
| 2010–11 | 5 | Pref. Aut. | 7th | |
| 2011–12 | 5 | Pref. Aut. | 5th | |
| 2012–13 | 5 | Pref. Aut. | 11th | |
| 2013–14 | 5 | Pref. Aut. | 6th | |
| 2014–15 | 5 | Pref. Aut. | 18th | |
| 2015–16 | 6 | 1ª Aut. | 2nd | |
| 2016–17 | 5 | Pref. | 6th | |
| 2017–18 | 5 | Pref. | 10th | |
| 2018–19 | 5 | Pref. | 1st | |
| 2019–20 | 4 | 3ª | 19th | Preliminary |
| 2020–21 | 4 | 3ª | 12th / 12th | |
| 2021–22 | 6 | Pref. | 5th | |
| 2022–23 | 6 | Pref. | 18th | |
| 2023–24 | 7 | 1ª Gal. | 18th | |
| 2024–25 | 8 | 2ª Futgal | 16th | |
| 2025–26 | 9 | 3ª Futgal | | |

- 2 seasons in Tercera División
