= CD Becerril =

Association football club in Spain

Becerril
- Full name: Club Deportivo Becerril
- Founded: 1977
- Ground: Mariano Haro, Becerril de Campos; Castile and León, Spain
- Capacity: 2,000
- Chairman: (Spain) Juan Antonio Redondo
- Manager: (Spain) José Antonio Hernando
- League: Primera Regional – Group A
- 2025–26: Tercera Federación – Group 8, 17th of 18 (relegated)
Home colours	Away colours

Club Deportivo Becerril is a football team based in Becerril de Campos in the autonomous community of Castile and León. Founded in 1977, it plays in the Primera Regional – Group A. Its stadium is Polideportivo Mariano Haro with a capacity of 2,000 seats.

== Season to season ==
Season	Tier	Division	Place	Copa del Rey
1977–78	7	2ª Reg.	6th	
1978–79	7	2ª Reg.	4th	
1979–80	7	2ª Reg.	5th	
1980–81	6	1ª Reg.	12th	
1981–82	6	1ª Reg.	12th	
1982–83	6	1ª Reg.	11th	
1983–84	7	2ª Reg.	8th	
1984–85	7	2ª Reg.	6th	
1985–86	7	2ª Reg.	5th	
1986–87	7	2ª Reg.	10th	
1987–88	7	2ª Reg.	5th	
1988–89	7	2ª Reg.	3rd	
1989–90	6	1ª Reg.	6th	
1990–91	6	1ª Reg.	12th	
1991–92	6	1ª Reg.	1st	
1992–93	5	Reg. Pref.	8th	
1993–94	5	Reg. Pref.	13th	
1994–95	5	Reg. Pref.	11th	
1995–96	5	Reg. Pref.	4th	
1996–97	5	Reg. Pref.	11th	

Season	Tier	Division	Place	Copa del Rey
1997–98	5	Reg. Pref.	1st	
1998–99	4	3ª	17th	
1999–2000	4	3ª	9th	
2000–01	4	3ª	12th	
2001–02	4	3ª	8th	
2002–03	4	3ª	12th	
2003–04	4	3ª	13th	
2004–05	4	3ª	12th	
2005–06	4	3ª	15th	
2006–07	4	3ª	9th	
2007–08	4	3ª	15th	
2008–09	4	3ª	18th	
2009–10	5	1ª Reg.	5th	
2010–11	5	1ª Reg.	7th	
2011–12	5	1ª Reg.	5th	
2012–13	5	1ª Reg.	2nd	
2013–14	4	3ª	17th	
2014–15	4	3ª	7th	
2015–16	4	3ª	20th	
2016–17	5	1ª Reg.	2nd	

Season	Tier	Division	Place	Copa del Rey
2017–18	4	3ª	19th	
2018–19	5	1ª Reg.	1st	
2019–20	4	3ª	14th	First round
2020–21	4	3ª	20th	
2021–22	6	1ª Reg.	1st	
2022–23	5	3ª Fed.	11th	
2023–24	5	3ª Fed.	8th	
2024–25	5	3ª Fed.	9th	
2025–26	5	3ª Fed.		

- 17 seasons in Tercera División
- 4 seasons in Tercera Federación
