= Álvaro Ocaña =

Spanish footballer

Personal information
- Full name: Álvaro Ocaña Gil
- Date of birth: 2 February 1993 (age 33)
- Place of birth: Teba, Spain
- Height: 1.70 m (5 ft 7 in)
- Position: Defender

Team information
- Current team: Mijas-Las Lagunas

Youth career
- 2009–2012: Málaga

Senior career*
Years	Team	Apps	(Gls)
2011–2012	Málaga B	6	(1)
2012–2013	Villarreal C	26	(0)
2013–2014	Villarreal B	0	(0)
2013–2014	→ Écija (loan)	34	(3)
2014–2015	Doxa	24	(1)
2015	Cacereño	18	(2)
2016	Marbella	15	(0)
2016–2018	El Ejido	44	(2)
2018–2019	Écija	22	(0)
2019–2020	Real Jaén	47	(1)
2020–2023	Vélez	77	(2)
2023–2025	Torre del Mar	49	(1)
2025–	Mijas-Las Lagunas	7	(0)
- * Club domestic league appearances and goals as of 19 October 2025

Álvaro Ocaña Gil (born 2 February 1993) is a Spanish professional footballer who plays for Tercera Federación club Mijas-Las Lagunas as a defender.

== Club career ==
Born in Teba, Province of Málaga, Ocaña played youth football with Málaga CF, but appeared solely for the reserves as a senior. In 2012, he joined Villarreal CF C and, the following year, signed for another lower league club, Écija Balompié from Segunda División B. On 5 January 2014 he scored his third and final goal of the season and contributed to a 2–0 home win against La Roda CF, but his team was eventually relegated.

On 6 June 2014, Ocaña moved to Doxa Katokopias FC, signing a two-year contract. He made his debut in top flight football on 14 September, featuring the full 90 minutes in a 0–4 home loss to AEL Limassol for the Cypriot First Division championship.
