= Miguel Martín (footballer) =

Spanish footballer

Personal information
- Full name: Miguel Martín Fernández
- Date of birth: 1 October 1997 (age 29)
- Place of birth: Motril, Spain
- Position: Forward

Team information
- Current team: Motril

Youth career
- Motril
- 2011–2012: Real Madrid
- 2012–2013: Granada 74
- 2013–2014: Santa Fe
- 2014–2015: Almería
- 2015–2016: Sevilla

Senior career*
Years	Team	Apps	(Gls)
2016–2018	Sevilla C	51	(17)
2017–2019	Sevilla B	34	(1)
2019–2020	Real Jaén	11	(4)
2020	Sanluqueño	0	(0)
2020–	Motril	4	(1)
- * Club domestic league appearances and goals as of 1 March 2020

Miguel Martín Fernández (born 1 October 1997) is a Spanish professional footballer who plays for Motril as a forward.

== Club career ==
Born in Motril, Granada, Andalusia, Martín finished his formation with Sevilla FC. He made his senior debut with the C-team on 27 August 2016, starting and scoring the first in a 3–3 Tercera División away draw against CD San Roque de Lepe.

On 22 October 2017, Martín scored a brace in a 2–0 home win against CD Cabecense, taking his tally up to seven goals in only ten matches during the campaign. He made his professional debut with the reserves on 10 December 2017, coming on as a second-half substitute for David Carmona in a 1–2 away loss against Gimnàstic de Tarragona in the Segunda División.

Martín left Sevilla on 16 July 2019, signing for fourth-tier Real Jaén.
