= CF Illueca =

Association football club in Spain

Illueca
- Full name: Club de Fútbol Illueca
- Founded: 1935
- Ground: Papa Luna, Illueca, Aragon, Spain
- Capacity: 3,500
- Chairman: Pedro Sancho Melús
- Manager: Luis Javier Romero
- League: Tercera Federación – Group 17
- 2025–26: Tercera Federación – Group 17, 12th of 18
Home colours	Away colours

Club de Fútbol Illueca is a Spanish football team based in Illueca, in the autonomous community of Aragon. Founded in 1935, the team plays in the Tercera Federación – Group 17, and holds home matches at Estadio Papa Luna.

== Season to season ==
Season	Tier	Division	Place	Copa del Rey
1971–72	6	2ª Reg.	4th	
1972–73	6	2ª Reg. P.	1st	
1973–74	5	1ª Reg.	5th	
1974–75	5	1ª Reg.	1st	
1975–76	4	Reg. Pref.	17th	
1976–77	5	1ª Reg.	1st	
1977–78	5	Reg. Pref.	11th	
1978–79	5	Reg. Pref.	5th	
1979–80	5	Reg. Pref.	5th	
1980–81	5	Reg. Pref.	8th	
1981–82	5	Reg. Pref.	7th	
1982–83	5	Reg. Pref.	7th	
1983–84	5	Reg. Pref.	7th	
1984–85	5	Reg. Pref.	4th	
1985–86	5	Reg. Pref.	10th	
1986–87	4	3ª	10th	
1987–88	4	3ª	10th	
1988–89	4	3ª	18th	
1989–90	5	Reg. Pref.	6th	
1990–91	5	Reg. Pref.	3rd	

Season	Tier	Division	Place	Copa del Rey
1991–92	5	Reg. Pref.	14th	
1992–93	5	Reg. Pref.	13th	
1993–94	5	Reg. Pref.	2nd	
1994–95	5	Reg. Pref.	1st	
1995–96	4	3ª	13th	
1996–97	4	3ª	12th	
1997–98	4	3ª	7th	
1998–99	4	3ª	10th	
1999–2000	4	3ª	18th	
2000–01	5	Reg. Pref.	3rd	
2001–02	5	Reg. Pref.	3rd	
2002–03	5	Reg. Pref.	4th	
2003–04	5	Reg. Pref.	3rd	
2004–05	5	Reg. Pref.	12th	
2005–06	5	Reg. Pref.	3rd	
2006–07	4	3ª	15th	
2007–08	4	3ª	19th	
2008–09	5	Reg. Pref.	5th	
2009–10	5	Reg. Pref.	11th	
2010–11	5	Reg. Pref.	7th	

Season	Tier	Division	Place	Copa del Rey
2011–12	5	Reg. Pref.	4th	
2012–13	5	Reg. Pref.	2nd	
2013–14	4	3ª	15th	
2014–15	4	3ª	11th	
2015–16	4	3ª	13th	
2016–17	4	3ª	9th	
2017–18	4	3ª	7th	
2018–19	4	3ª	2nd	
2019–20	4	3ª	5th	First round
2021–22	5	3ª RFEF	3rd	
2022–23	5	3ª Fed.	7th	
2023–24	5	3ª Fed.	16th	
2024–25	6	Reg. Pref.	2nd	
2025–26	5	3ª Fed.	12th	
2026–27	5	3ª Fed.		

- 17 seasons in Tercera División
- 5 seasons in Tercera Federación/Tercera División RFEF
