= Julen Castañeda =

Spanish footballer

Personal information
- Full name: Julen Castañeda Nuin
- Date of birth: 14 November 1990 (age 36)
- Place of birth: San Sebastián, Spain
- Height: 1.80 m (5 ft 11 in)
- Position: Left-back

Team information
- Current team: Amorebieta
- Number: 3

Youth career
- Real Sociedad

Senior career*
Years	Team	Apps	(Gls)
2010–2013	Real Sociedad B	88	(4)
2013–2015	Ponferradina	33	(1)
2016	Burgos	16	(1)
2016–2019	Racing Santander	106	(1)
2019–2023	Cultural Leonesa	102	(5)
2023–2025	Zamora	47	(2)
2025–	Amorebieta	27	(3)
- * Club domestic league appearances and goals as of 14 May 2026

Julen Castañeda Nuin (born 14 November 1990) is a Spanish footballer who plays for Segunda Federación club Amorebieta as a left-back.

== Club career ==
Born in San Sebastián, Gipuzkoa, Castañeda played youth football with local Real Sociedad. He made his senior debut in the 2010–11 season with the B team, in the Segunda División B.

On 14 July 2013, Castañeda signed a two-year deal with Segunda División club SD Ponferradina. He played his first professional game on 17 August, starting in a 1–0 away loss against Córdoba CF.

Castañeda scored his first goal in the competition on 9 November 2014, his side's second in the 3–3 home draw with Recreativo de Huelva. He was released in 2015, and subsequently resumed his career in the third division by representing Burgos CF, Racing de Santander and Cultural y Deportiva Leonesa.
