= Álvaro Romero =

Spanish footballer

Personal information
- Full name: Álvaro Romero Morillo
- Date of birth: 12 May 1996 (age 30)
- Place of birth: Sevilla, Spain
- Height: 1.64 m (5 ft 5 in)
- Position: Winger

Team information
- Current team: Lincoln Red Imps
- Number: 11

Youth career
- Nervión
- 2014–2015: Diocesano

Senior career*
Years	Team	Apps	(Gls)
2014	Nervión	?	(1)
2015–2016	Azuaga	37	(20)
2016–2017	Arenas Getxo	20	(4)
2017	Murcia	0	(0)
2017	→ Jumilla (loan)	10	(0)
2017–2018	Badajoz	13	(0)
2018–2019	Extremadura B	24	(13)
2018–2019	Extremadura	4	(0)
2019–2021	Unionistas	26	(1)
2020–2021	→ Algeciras (loan)	24	(4)
2021–2023	Algeciras	63	(23)
2023–2025	Tenerife	8	(0)
2025–2026	Zamora	33	(1)
2026–	Lincoln Red Imps	8	(1)
- * Club domestic league appearances and goals as of 22 November 2026

Álvaro Romero Morillo (born 12 May 1996) is a Spanish footballer who plays as a winger for Lincoln Red Imps.

== Club career ==
Born in Seville, Andalusia, Romero represented AD Nervión as a youth, featuring with the first-team during the 2013–14 campaign and scoring once in a 5–2 Segunda Andaluza home routing of AD Cerro del Águila. In August 2014, he moved to CD Diocesano and returned to youth football.

Ahead of the 2015–16 season, Romero joined Tercera División side CD Azuaga, being the club's top goalscorer with 20 goals. On 25 May 2016, he agreed to a contract with Arenas Club de Getxo of Segunda División B.

On 2 February 2017, Romero signed for Real Murcia also in the third division, being immediately loaned to fellow league team FC Jumilla until June. On 18 August, he moved to CD Badajoz in the same category.

On 21 July 2018, Romero joined Segunda División side Extremadura UD, being initially assigned to the reserves in the fourth division. He made his professional debut on 30 September, coming on as a second-half substitute for Chuli in a 2–2 Segunda División home draw against Elche CF.

On 26 June 2019, Romero joined Unionistas de Salamanca CF in the third division. The following 23 January, he scored the equalizer in a Copa del Rey match against Real Madrid, but his side eventually lost 1–3.

On 14 September 2020, Romero was loaned to fellow third level side Algeciras CF for the season. The following 13 July, he signed permanently for the side, for a fee of € 25,000.

On 29 June 2023, Romero signed a three-year contract with CD Tenerife in the second division.

On 15 January 2025, Romero moved to Zamora on a one-and-a-half-year contract.

== Personal life ==
Romero is a lifelong Sevilla FC supporter whose dream is to play for Sevilla, and also worked as a groundsman for Azuaga's stadium while playing for the club. His father Pedrito was also a footballer, playing for both Azuaga and AD Llerenense.
