= Pedro López (footballer, born 1997) =

Spanish footballer

Personal information
- Full name: Pedro López Rodríguez
- Date of birth: 21 January 1997 (age 29)
- Place of birth: Lugo, Spain
- Height: 1.77 m (5 ft 10 in)
- Position: Centre-back

Youth career
- Prone Lugo
- Lugo

Senior career*
Years	Team	Apps	(Gls)
2016–2019	Polvorín	88	(3)
2017–2022	Lugo	4	(0)
2019–2020	→ Unionistas (loan)	18	(0)
2022–2024	Sarriana	43	(2)
- * Club domestic league appearances and goals as of 22 October 2023

Pedro López Rodríguez (born 21 January 1997) is a Spanish footballer who plays as a centre-back.

== Club career ==
Born in Lugo, Galicia, López was a CD Lugo youth graduate. He was promoted to the farm team ahead of the 2016–17 season, and made his senior debut on 28 August 2016 by starting in a 2–0 Tercera División home win against Xallas FC.

López made his first team debut on 21 August 2017, starting in a 0–0 home draw against CF Reus Deportiu in the Segunda División. He scored his first senior goal on 7 October 2018, netting Polvorín's only goal in a 1–2 home loss against CD Boiro.

On 9 July 2019, López was loaned to Segunda División B side Unionistas de Salamanca CF for the season. Upon returning, he featured rarely before leaving the club on 26 January 2022 by mutual agreement.
