= Estadio Reino de León =

Football stadium in Castile and León, Spain

Reino de León
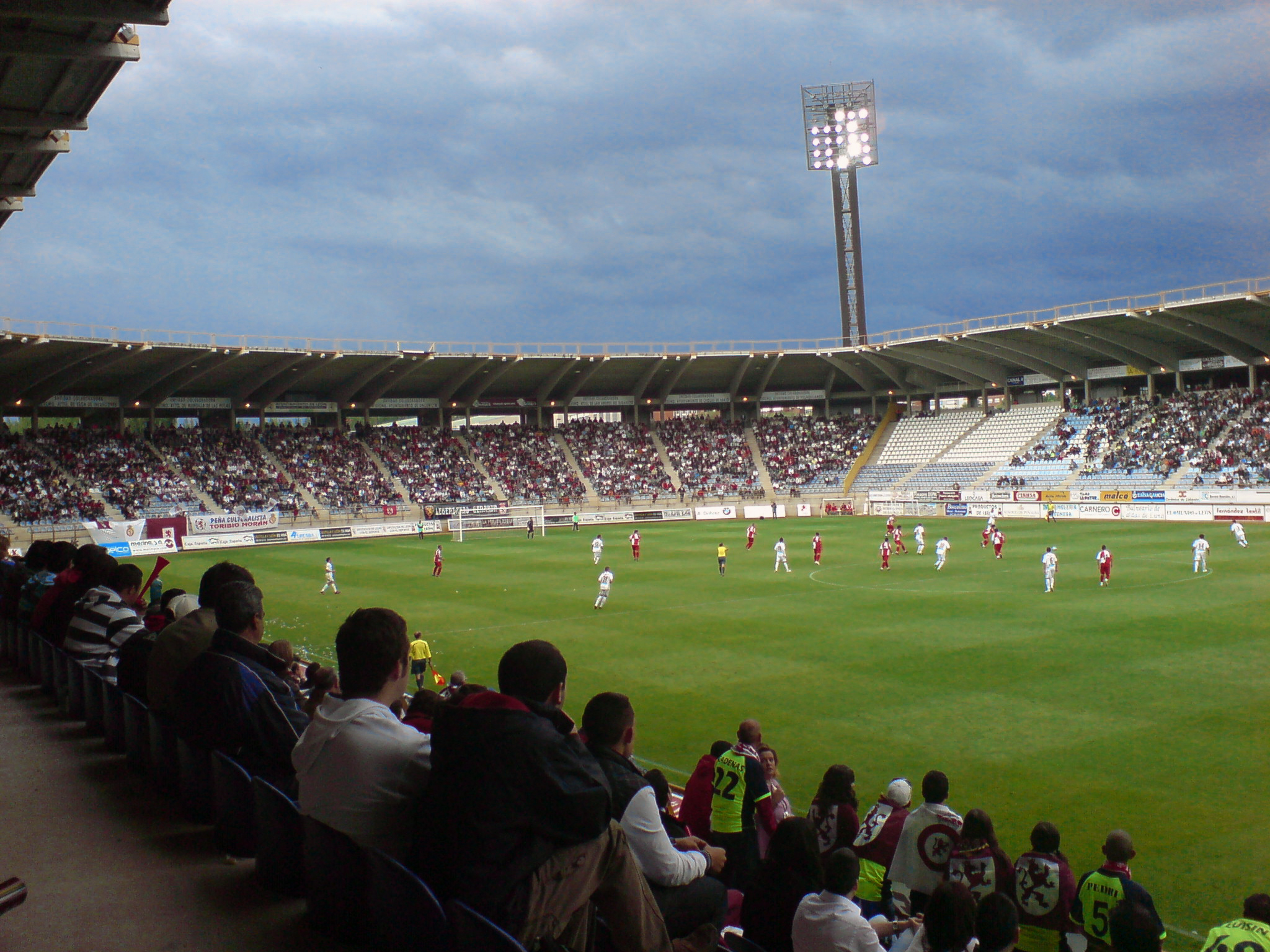
- Estadio Reino de León on a matchday
- Interactive map of Reino de León
- Former names: Nuevo Estadio Antonio Amilivia (Until 2008)
- Location: León, Spain
- Coordinates: 42.587482°N 5.576699°W
- Owner: Leonese City Council
- Capacity: 13,346
- Record attendance: 13,451 (Cultural Leonesa v Barcelona B; 28 May 2017)
- Field size: 105 metres (115 yd) x 68 metres (74 yd)

Construction
- Opened: May 20, 2001

Tenants
- Cultural Leonesa (2001–present); Spain national football team (selected matches)

Estadio Municipal Reino de León is a football stadium located in León, in the autonomous community of Castile and León, Spain. It is the home stadium of Cultural Leonesa (who currently play in the Segunda División B), with a capacity of 13,346 seats.

== History ==
The stadium was inaugurated with a Segunda División B promotional play-off match between Cultural Leonesa vs Xerez CD, where the home team won 1–0, with Ibán Espadas who scored the first goal in the history of this stadium. It took place on May 20, 2001.

== International matches ==
Data	Opponent	Score	Competition
2 April 2003	Armenia	3–0	UEFA Euro 2004 qualifying Group 6 - Matchday 10
12 June 2015	Costa Rica	2–1	Friendly
5 September 2016	Liechtenstein	8–0	2018 FIFA World Cup qualification – UEFA Group G - Matchday 1
