= Fofo (footballer) =

Spanish footballer

Personal information
- Full name: Adolfo Enríquez García
- Date of birth: 2 March 1990 (age 36)
- Place of birth: Alicante, Spain
- Height: 1.80 m (5 ft 11 in)
- Position: Striker

Team information
- Current team: Mutxamel

Youth career
- Sant Joan d'Alacant
- Alicante
- → Carolinas (loan)

Senior career*
Years	Team	Apps	(Gls)
2009	Alicante B	8	(3)
2009–2011	Villarreal C	35	(5)
2009–2012	Villarreal B	14	(2)
2012–2014	Ponferradina	50	(11)
2014–2016	Mallorca	29	(3)
2016	Llagostera	12	(1)
2016–2017	Mirandés	16	(1)
2017–2024	La Nucía	150	(42)
2024	Athletic Torrellano	10	(1)
2025	Intercity	2	(0)
2025	Jávea	4	(0)
2026–	Mutxamel	4	(1)
- * Club domestic league appearances and goals as of 17:13, 5 August 2026 (UTC)

Adolfo Enríquez García (born 2 March 1990), known as Fofo, is a Spanish footballer who plays as a striker for Mutxamel CF.

== Club career ==
Born in Alicante, Valencian Community, Fofo came through the youth ranks at hometown team Alicante CF, making his senior debut for their reserves in the Tercera División in 2009 before transferring to regional neighbours Villarreal CF. He first played with the B side in the Segunda División on 26 September of that year in a 2–2 home draw against Albacete Balompié as a late substitute, making three more such appearances over the season; he scored his first goal as a professional on 18 September 2011, in a 3–3 draw with CD Guadalajara also at the Estadio El Madrigal.

On 24 January 2012, Fofo signed for Segunda División B club SD Ponferradina, helping them to promotion via the playoffs. He netted a career-best ten goals over the 2013–14 campaign, including two on 8 September 2013 in a 2–2 home draw against Sporting de Gijón.

Fofo fulfilled a childhood dream by signing a two-year contract at fellow second-tier side RCD Mallorca on 29 July 2014. On 31 January 2016, after cutting his ties, he switched to UE Llagostera scoring once in an eventual unsuccessful attempt to save the Catalans from relegation in the same league.

On 14 July 2016, Fofo stayed in division two by agreeing to a one-year deal at CD Mirandés.
