= El Álamo =

- Municipality
- Flag Coat of arms

- Municipal location within the Community of Madrid.
- Coordinates: 40°13′50″N 3°59′40″W
- Country: Spain
- Autonomous community: Community of Madrid

Government
  - Mayor: Alberto Cabezas Ortega (PP)

Area
  - Total: 22.25 km^{2} (8.59 sq mi)

Population (2025-01-01)
  - Total: 10,594
- Time zone: UTC+1 (CET)
  - Summer (DST): UTC+2 (CEST)

El Álamo (Spanish pronunciation: [el ˈalamo]) is a municipality of the autonomous community of the Community of Madrid in central Spain. It is located in the comarca of Navalcarnero.

El Álamo is the location of the headquarters of the Atresmedia TV network.

== Politics ==
The municipality is often in the balance at local elections. In 2023 it elected a PP administration led by mayor Alberto Cabezas Ortega, who runs a "coffee with the mayor" initiative to discuss urban issues in an informal and friendly setting.

Party	Votes	%	+/-	Seats	+/-
PP	1,887	39.17	▲7.95	7	▲2
PSOE	1,439	29.87	▲0.64	6	▲2
Vox	654	13.57	▲5.3	2	▲1
Alternativa Ciudadana Alameña	473	9.81	▲3.39	1	0
Podemos/IU/AV	292	6.06	▼0.96	1	0
No overall control, PP minority					
