= Guille Andrés =

Spanish footballer (born 1992)

Personal information
- Full name: Guillermo Andrés López
- Date of birth: 13 October 1992 (age 34)
- Place of birth: Xàtiva, Spain
- Height: 1.68 m (5 ft 6 in)
- Position: Forward

Team information
- Current team: Alcoyano
- Number: 14

Youth career
- Villarreal
- 2012–2014: Wigan Athletic

Senior career*
Years	Team	Apps	(Gls)
2011	Villarreal C	4	(0)
2011–2012	Olímpic Xàtiva	16	(2)
2014–2015	Valladolid B	21	(9)
2014–2015	Valladolid	6	(0)
2015–2016	Celta B	25	(4)
2016	Senica	10	(2)
2017	Espanyol B	8	(1)
2017–2018	Peña Deportiva	38	(5)
2018–2020	Unionistas	40	(9)
2020–2021	Mérida	6	(0)
2021	Atzeneta	13	(1)
2021–2023	Teruel	64	(14)
2023–2024	Atlético Saguntino	26	(5)
2024–2025	Badalona Futur	31	(3)
2025–	Alcoyano	12	(0)
- * Club domestic league appearances and goals as of 7 May 2026

Guillermo "Guille" Andrés López (born 13 October 1992), is a Spanish footballer who plays for Segunda Federación club Alcoyano mainly as a forward.

== Club career ==
Born in Xàtiva, Valencia, Guille finished his formation at Villarreal CF, making his debuts with the C-team in the 2010–11 campaign, in Tercera División. In the 2011 summer he joined CD Olímpic de Xàtiva in Segunda División B, appearing regularly and scoring two goals during his one-year spell.

In June 2012 Guille moved abroad, signing for Wigan Athletic F.C., being assigned to the U21 squad. On 24 July 2014 he returned to Spain, joining Real Valladolid and being initially assigned to the reserves also in the third level.

Guille made his first-team debut on 15 October, starting and scoring the first of a 2–0 home win over Girona FC for the season's Copa del Rey. Three days later he made his league debut, replacing André Leão in the 79th minute of a 0–0 home draw against SD Ponferradina in the Segunda División championship.

On 17 July 2015 Guille moved to another reserve team, Celta de Vigo B also in the third tier.
