= 2018–19 Gimnàstic de Tarragona season =

Gimnàstic de Tarragona
2018–19 season
- President: Josep María Andreu
- Manager: Enrique Martín
- Segunda División: 20th (relegated)
- Copa del Rey: 2nd round
- Copa Catalunya (friendly): Semifinals
- Top goalscorer: League: Luis Suárez (7); All: Luis Suárez (7)
- Highest home attendance: 8,625 vs. Granada (8 Dec)
- Lowest home attendance: 2,042 vs. Elche (26 May)
- Average home league attendance: 4,338 (20 matches)
Home colours	Away colours

The 2018–19 Gimnàstic de Tarragona's season was the 132nd season in the club's existence and the fourth consecutive in Segunda División.

== Players ==
=== Squad ===
As of 10 June 2019

No.	Name	Position	Nat.	Place of birth	Date of birth (age)	Club caps	Club goals	Int. caps	Int. goals	Signed from	Date signed	Fee	Contract End
Goalkeepers
1	Isaac Becerra	GK	(Spain) (Catalonia)	Badalona	18 June 1988 (aged 30)	19	0	–	–	Valladolid	31 July 2018	Undisc.	30 June 2021
13	Bernabé Barragán	GK	(Spain) (Andalusia)	Los Palacios	18 February 1993 (aged 26)	25	0	–	–	Atlético Madrid	20 July 2017	Free	30 June 2020
35	Arturo Cordero	GK	(Spain) (Andalusia)	Moguer	2 October 1994 (aged 24)	–	–	–	–	Pobla	31 January 2019	Free	Undisclosed
Defenders
2	Iván López	RB	(Spain) (Valencian Community)	Valencia	23 August 1993 (aged 25)	7	0	–	–	Levante	28 August 2018	Loan	30 June 2019
3	Josema	CB	(Spain) (Region of Murcia)	Lorquí	6 June 1996 (aged 23)	4	0	–	–	Córdoba	31 January 2019	Loan	30 June 2019
15	Pipa	RB/RW	(Spain) (Catalonia)	Esparreguera	26 January 1998 (aged 21)	18	0	–	–	Espanyol	2 January 2019	Loan	30 June 2019
17	Mikel Villanueva	CB	(Venezuela)	San Cristóbal	14 April 1993 (aged 26)	17	0	15	2	Málaga	9 January 2019	Loan	30 June 2019
20	Sebas Coris	RB/RW	(Spain) (Catalonia)	Tossa de Mar	31 May 1993 (aged 26)	17	0	–	–	Girona	10 August 2018	Loan	30 June 2019
21	Fabián Noguera	CB	(Argentina)	Ramos Mejía	20 March 1993 (aged 26)	16	0	–	–	Santos (Brazil)	22 January 2019	Loan	30 June 2019
22	Abraham Minero	LB/LW	(Spain) (Catalonia)	Granollers	22 February 1986 (aged 33)	64	0	–	–	Zaragoza	6 July 2017	Free	30 June 2019
23	Pol Valentín	RB/RW	(Spain) (Catalonia)	Avinyonet	21 February 1997 (aged 22)	12	0	–	–	Pobla	29 July 2017	Free	30 June 2020
24	Mohammed Djetei	CB	(Cameroon)	Yaoundé	18 August 1994 (aged 24)	35	0	6	0	Union Douala (Cameroon)	4 July 2016	Undisc.	30 June 2020
28	Roger Figueras	CB/RB	(Spain) (Catalonia)	Valls	5 April 1997 (aged 22)	3	0	–	–	Pobla	29 July 2017	Free	30 June 2019
33	Salva Ferrer	CB/RB	(Spain) (Catalonia)	Sant Joan Samora	21 January 1998 (aged 21)	21	0	–	–	Pobla	6 October 2018	Free	30 June 2021
36	Iván de Nova	LB/CB	(Spain) (Catalonia)	Tarragona	22 September 1996 (aged 22)	1	0	–	–	Pobla	29 July 2017	Free	30 June 2019
38	Sergi Cardona	LB	(Spain) (Catalonia)	Lloret de Mar	1999 (age 26–27)	1	0	–	–	Pobla	8 June 2019	Free	Undisclosed
Midfielders
5	Ousseynou Thioune	DM/CM	(Senegal)	Dakar	16 November 1993 (aged 25)	18	0	6	0	Ittihad Tanger (Morocco)	18 December 2018	Undisc.	30 June 2019
6	Javi Márquez	CM	(Spain) (Catalonia)	Barcelona	11 May 1986 (aged 33)	38	1	–	–	NY Cosmos (United States)	8 January 2018	Free	30 June 2020
7	Abdelaziz Barrada	CM	(Morocco)	Provins (France)	19 June 1989 (aged 29)	4	0	26	4	Antalyaspor (Turkey)	17 January 2019	Loan	30 June 2019
14	Miguel Palanca	RW/SS	(Spain) (Catalonia)	Tarragona	18 December 1987 (aged 31)	28	3	–	–	FC Goa (India)	31 January 2019	Free	30 June 2019
16	Imanol García	CM	(Spain) (Navarre)	Ezcároz	26 December 1995 (aged 23)	24	1	–	–	Osasuna	20 November 2018	Loan	30 June 2019
18	Antonio Cotán	CM	(Spain) (Andalusia)	Olivares	19 September 1995 (aged 23)	10	0	–	–	Valladolid	31 January 2019	Free	30 June 2019
19	Ramiro Guerra	CM	(Uruguay)	Montevideo	21 March 1997 (aged 22)	3	0	–	–	Villarreal	21 August 2018	Loan	30 June 2019
27	Bernard Sun	CM	(China)	Shanghai	3 February 1999 (aged 20)	2	0	–	–	Jumilla	30 January 2019	Loan	30 June 2019
29	Brugui	LW/SS	(Spain) (Catalonia)	Bàscara	4 November 1996 (aged 22)	18	0	–	–	Pobla	31 August 2017	Free	30 June 2020
30	Pol Prats	RW/SS	(Spain) (Catalonia)	Paüls	25 May 1999 (aged 20)	4	1	–	–	Pobla	3 March 2018	Free	Undisclosed
31	Viti Martínez	CM	(Spain) (Catalonia)	Mataró	25 May 1997 (aged 22)	14	0	–	–	Pobla	27 October 2018	Free	30 June 2020
32	Sergio Montero	AM/SS	(Spain) (Catalonia)	Ripollet	17 March 1997 (aged 22)	1	0	–	–	Pobla	7 December 2018	Free	Undisclosed
39	Bernat Guiu	CM	(Spain) (Catalonia)	Marçà	20 September 2000 (aged 18)	–	–	–	–	Pobla	8 June 2019	Free	Undisclosed
Forwards
8	Ike Uche	ST	(Nigeria)	Aba	5 January 1984 (aged 35)	76	21	46	19	Tigres UANL (Mexico)	10 August 2016	Free	30 June 2020
9	Berat Sadik	ST	(Finland)	Skopje (Socialist Federal Republic of Yugoslavia)	14 September 1986 (aged 32)	11	1	11	1	Doxa (Cyprus)	22 January 2019	Free	30 June 2020
11	José Kanté	SS/LW	(Guinea)	Sabadell (Spain)	27 September 1990 (aged 28)	14	3	6	1	Legia Warsaw	31 January 2019	Loan	30 June 2019
26	Luis Suárez	ST	(Colombia)	Santa Marta	2 December 1997 (aged 21)	37	7	–	–	Watford (England)	9 July 2018	Loan	30 June 2019

== Transfers ==
=== In ===
No.	Pos.	Nat.	Name	Age	EU	Moving from	Type	Transfer window	Ends	Transfer fee	Source
29	FW	(Spain)	Brugui	21	EU	Pobla de Mafumet	Promoted	Summer	2020	Free	Diari de Tarragona
23	DF	(Spain)	Pol Valentín	21	EU	Pobla de Mafumet	Promoted	Summer	2020	Free	Diari de Tarragona
—	GK	(Spain)	Alberto Varo	25	EU	Barcelona B	Loan return	Summer	2020	Free	Nastic.cat
15	DF	(Spain)	Carlos Blanco	22	EU	Betis B	Loan return	Summer	2019	Free	Nastic.cat
—	DF	(Spain)	Juanmi Carrión	20	EU	Linense	Loan return	Summer	2021	Free	Nastic.cat
28	MF	(Spain)	Carlos García	24	EU	Jumilla	Loan return	Summer	2019	Free	Nastic.cat
30	MF	(Italy)	Sandro Toscano	22	EU	Melilla	Loan return	Summer	2019	Free	Nastic.cat
16	FW	(Albania)	Elvir Maloku	22	EU	AEK Larnaca (Cyprus)	Loan return	Summer	2020	Free	Nastic.cat
9	FW	(Cameroon)	Stephane Emaná	24	EU	Atlético Madrid B	Loan return	Summer	2019	Free	Nastic.cat
21	MF	(Spain)	David Rocha	33	EU	Oviedo	Transfer	Summer	2020	Free	Gimnàstic
—	FW	(Paraguay)	Rodri Cuenca	22	EU	Atlético Baleares	Transfer	Summer	2022	Free	Marca
26	FW	(Colombia)	Luis Suárez	20	Non-EU	Watford (England)	Loan	Summer	2019	Free	Gimnàstic
14	FW	(Spain)	Manu del Moral	34	EU	Numancia	Transfer	Summer	2019	Free	Gimnàstic
27	DF	(Venezuela)	Josua Mejías	21	Non-EU	Leganés	Loan	Summer	2019	Free	Gimnàstic
25	GK	(Spain)	Isaac Becerra	30	EU	Valladolid	Transfer	Summer	2021	Undisclosed	Gimnàstic
17	FW	(Spain)	Nacho Abeledo	22	EU	Atlético Malagueño	Transfer	Summer	2020	Free	Gimnàstic
20	MF	(Spain)	Sebas Coris	27	EU	Girona	Loan	Summer	2019	Free	Gimnàstic
19	MF	(Uruguay)	Ramiro Guerra	21	EU	Villarreal	Loan	Summer	2019	Free	Gimnàstic
—	DF	(Algeria)	Liassine Cadamuro	30	EU	Nîmes Olympique (France)	Transfer	Summer	2020	Free	Gimnàstic
2	DF	(Spain)	Iván López	24	EU	Levante	Loan	Summer	2019	Free	Gimnàstic
9	DF	(Spain)	Raúl Albentosa	30	EU	Deportivo de La Coruña	Loan	Summer	2019	Free	Deportivo
16	MF	(Spain)	Imanol García	22	EU	Osasuna	Loan	Summer	2019	Free	Gimnàstic
5	MF	(Senegal)	Ousseynou Thioune	25	Non-EU	Ittihad Tanger (Morocco)	Transfer	Winter	2019	Undisclosed	Gimnàstic
15	DF	(Spain)	Pipa	20	EU	Espanyol	Loan	Winter	2019	Free	Gimnàstic
17	DF	(Venezuela)	Mikel Villanueva	25	Non-EU	Málaga	Loan	Winter	2019	Free	Gimnàstic
7	MF	(Morocco)	Abdelaziz Barrada	29	EU	Antalyaspor (Turkey)	Loan	Winter	2019	Free	Gimnàstic
9	FW	(Finland)	Berat Sadik	32	EU	Doxa Katokopias (Cyprus)	Transfer	Winter	2020	Free	Gimnàstic
21	DF	(Argentina)	Fabián Noguera	25	Non-EU	Santos (Brazil)	Loan	Winter	2019	Free	Gimnàstic
27	MF	(China)	Bernard Sun	19	Non-EU	Jumilla	Loan	Winter	2019	Free	Gimnàstic
18	MF	(Spain)	Antonio Cotán	23	EU	Valladolid	Transfer	Winter	2019	Free	Gimnàstic
11	FW	(Guinea)	José Kanté	28	EU	Legia Warsaw (Poland)	Loan	Winter	2019	Free	Gimnàstic
3	DF	(Spain)	Josema	22	EU	Córdoba	Loan	Winter	2019	Free	Gimnàstic
14	MF	(Spain)	Miguel Palanca	31	EU	FC Goa (India)	Transfer	Winter	2019	Free	Gimnàstic

Total spending: ▼€0

=== Out ===
No.	Pos.	Nat.	Name	Age	EU	Moving to	Type	Transfer window	Transfer fee	Source
4	DF	(Spain)	Xavi Molina	31	EU	Eupen (Belgium)	Contract ended	Summer	Free	Gimnàstic
23	MF	(Spain)	Sergio Tejera	28	EU	Oviedo	Contract ended	Summer	Free	Gimnàstic
17	MF	(Spain)	Javier Matilla	29	EU	Aris Thessaloniki (Greece)	Contract ended	Summer	Free	Gimnàstic
5	MF	(Spain)	Jon Gaztañaga	26	EU	AEL Limassol (Cyprus)	Contract rescinded	Summer	Free	Gimnàstic
33	GK	(Spain)	José Perales	25	EU	Badalona	Contract rescinded	Summer	Free	Gimnàstic
10	MF	(Spain)	Juan Muñiz	26	EU	Lugo	Contract ended	Summer	Free	Gimnàstic
12	MF	(Ivory Coast)	Jean Luc	25	EU	AEK Larnaca (Cyprus)	Contract ended	Summer	Free	Gimnàstic
18	DF	(Japan)	Daisuke Suzuki	28	Non-EU	Kashiwa Reysol (Japan)	Contract ended	Summer	Free	Gimnàstic
26	MF	(Spain)	Rayco Rodríguez	21	EU	Lugo	Contract ended	Summer	Free	
15	FW	(Spain)	Álvaro Vázquez	27	EU	Espanyol	Loan return	Summer	Free	Gimnàstic
16	DF	(Spain)	Julio Pleguezuelo	21	EU	Arsenal (England)	Loan return	Summer	Free	Gimnàstic
—	GK	(Spain)	Alberto Varo	25	EU	Lugo	Transfer	Summer	Undisclosed	Mundo Deportivo
19	FW	(Cameroon)	Jean Marie Dongou	23	EU	Lugo	Contract rescinded	Summer	Free	Gimnàstic
15	DF	(Spain)	Carlos Blanco	22	EU	Villarreal B	Contract rescinded	Summer	Free	Gimnàstic
30	MF	(Italy)	Sandro Toscano	22	EU	Ebro	Contract rescinded	Summer	Free	Diario AS
—	DF	(Spain)	Juanmi Carrión	20	EU	Melilla	Contract rescinded	Summer	Free	Gimnàstic
28	MF	(Spain)	Carlos García	24	EU	Racing de Ferrol	Contract rescinded	Summer	Free	Gimnàstic
9	FW	(Cameroon)	Stephane Emaná	24	EU	Hércules	Contract rescinded	Summer	Free	Gimnàstic
16	FW	(Albania)	Elvir Maloku	22	EU	NK Aluminij (Slovenia)	Loan	Summer	Free	Gimnàstic
2	DF	(Georgia (country))	Oto Kakabadze	23	EU	FC Luzern (Switzerland)	Transfer	Summer	Undisclosed	Gimnàstic
—	FW	(Paraguay)	Rodri Cuenca	22	EU	Ebro	Loan	Summer	Free	Gimnàstic
1	GK	(North Macedonia)	Stole Dimitrievski	24	EU	Rayo Vallecano	Loan	Summer	Free	Rayo Vallecano
17	MF	(Spain)	Nacho Abeledo	23	EU	Deportivo Fabril	Loan	Winter	Free	Gimnàstic
9	DF	(Spain)	Raúl Albentosa	30	EU	Deportivo La Coruña	Loan return	Winter	Free	Gimnàstic
14	FW	(Spain)	Manu del Moral	34	EU	Rayo Majadahonda	Contract rescinded	Winter	Free	Gimnàstic
21	MF	(Spain)	David Rocha	33	EU	Almería	Contract rescinded	Winter	Free	Gimnàstic
—	FW	(Paraguay)	Rodri Cuenca	22	EU	Atlético Baleares	Loan	Winter	Free	Gimnàstic
7	MF	(Spain)	Tete Morente	22	EU	Lugo	Loan	Winter	Free	Gimnàstic
11	FW	(Spain)	Manu Barreiro	32	EU	Lugo	Transfer	Winter	Undisclosed	Gimnàstic
18	DF	(Algeria)	Liassine Cadamuro	30	EU	Concordia Chiajna (Romania)	Contract rescinded	Winter	Free	Gimnàstic
27	DF	(Venezuela)	Josua Mejías	21	Non-EU	Leganés	Loan return	Winter	Free	Gimnàstic
12	MF	(Sweden)	Nicolao Dumitru	27	EU	Livorno (Italy)	Contract rescinded	Winter	Free	Gimnàstic
3	DF	(Spain)	Javi Jiménez	23	EU	Cultural Leonesa	Contract rescinded	Winter	Free	Gimnàstic
10	MF	(Spain)	Omar Perdomo	25	EU	Ibiza	Contract rescinded	Winter	Free	Gimnàstic
—	GK	(North Macedonia)	Stole Dimitrievski	25	EU	Rayo Vallecano	Transfer	Winter	Undisclosed	Gimnàstic
—	DF	(Spain)	César Arzo	33	EU	Free agent	Retired	Winter	Free	

Total gaining: ▲€0

Balance

Total: ▼€0

== Managers ==
Name	Nat.	Place of birth	Date of birth (age)	Signed from	Date signed	Role	G	W	D	L	%	Departure	Manner	Contract End
José Antonio Gordillo	(Spain) (Andalusia)	Morón de la Frontera	24 January 1974 (age 52)	Levante	14 May 2018	Permanent	11	1	3	7	9.09	22 October 2018	Sacked	30 June 2019
Enrique Martín	(Spain) (Navarre)	Pamplona	9 March 1956 (age 70)	Free agent	23 October 2018	Permanent	31	7	6	18	22.58			30 June 2019

== Player statistics ==
=== Squad statistics ===
As of 10 June 2019

No.	Pos	Nat	Player	Total		Segunda División		Copa del Rey	
No.	Pos	Nat	Player	Apps	Goals	Apps	Goals	Apps	Goals
1	GK	(Spain) ESP	Isaac Becerra	19	0	18	0	1	0
2	DF	(Spain) ESP	Iván López	7	0	6+1	0	0	0
3	DF	(Spain) ESP	Josema	4	0	4	0	0	0
5	MF	(Senegal) SEN	Ousseynou Thioune	18	0	17+1	0	0	0
6	MF	(Spain) ESP	Javi Márquez	25	1	17+7	1	1	0
7	MF	(Morocco) MAR	Abdelaziz Barrada	4	0	1+3	0	0	0
8	FW	(Nigeria) NGR	Ike Uche	28	5	17+10	5	1	0
9	FW	(Finland) FIN	Berat Sadik	11	1	3+8	1	0	0
11	FW	(Guinea) GUI	José Kanté	14	3	7+7	3	0	0
13	GK	(Spain) ESP	Bernabé Barragán	23	0	23	0	0	0
14	MF	(Spain) ESP	Miguel Palanca	8	0	5+3	0	0	0
15	DF	(Spain) ESP	Pipa	18	0	17+1	0	0	0
16	MF	(Spain) ESP	Imanol García	24	1	24	1	0	0
17	DF	(Venezuela) VEN	Mikel Villanueva	17	0	16+1	0	0	0
18	MF	(Spain) ESP	Antonio Cotán	10	0	5+5	0	0	0
19	MF	(Uruguay) URU	Ramiro Guerra	3	0	3	0	0	0
20	MF	(Spain) ESP	Sebas Coris	17	0	16+1	0	0	0
21	DF	(Argentina) ARG	Fabián Noguera	16	0	16	0	0	0
22	DF	(Spain) ESP	Abraham Minero	34	0	34	0	0	0
23	DF	(Spain) ESP	Pol Valentín	11	0	3+7	0	1	0
24	DF	(Cameroon) CMR	Mohammed Djetei	24	0	19+4	0	1	0
26	FW	(Colombia) COL	Luis Suárez	37	7	27+9	7	0+1	0
27	MF	(China) CHN	Bernard Sun	2	0	0+2	0	0	0
28	DF	(Spain) ESP	Roger Figueras	3	0	3	0	0	0
29	FW	(Spain) ESP	Brugui	15	0	7+7	0	0+1	0
30	FW	(Spain) ESP	Pol Prats	4	1	3+1	1	0	0
31	MF	(Spain) ESP	Viti Martínez	14	0	12+2	0	0	0
32	FW	(Spain) ESP	Sergio Montero	1	0	1	0	0	0
33	DF	(Spain) ESP	Salva Ferrer	21	0	15+6	0	0	0
36	DF	(Spain) ESP	Iván de Nova	1	0	0	0	1	0
38	DF	(Spain) ESP	Sergi Cardona	1	0	0+1	0	0	0
39	MF	(Spain) ESP	Bernat Guiu	0	0	0	0	0	0
Players on loan to other clubs:
4	MF	(Spain) ESP	Fali	29	3	27+1	3	0+1	0
–	MF	(Spain) ESP	Nacho Abeledo	4	0	0+3	0	1	0
–	MF	(Chile) CHI	Juan Delgado	0	0	0	0	0	0
–	MF	(Spain) ESP	Tete Morente	15	1	12+2	1	1	0
–	FW	(Albania) ALB	Elvir Maloku	0	0	0	0	0	0
Players who have left the club after the start of the season:
2	DF	(Georgia (country)) GEO	Oto Kakabadze	2	0	2	0	0	0
3	DF	(Spain) ESP	Javi Jiménez	7	0	4+3	0	0	0
9	DF	(Spain) ESP	Raúl Albentosa	11	2	11	2	0	0
10	MF	(Spain) ESP	Omar Perdomo	8	0	1+7	0	0	0
11	FW	(Spain) ESP	Manu Barreiro	20	1	15+5	1	0	0
12	MF	(Italy) ITA	Nicolao Dumitru	4	0	1+2	0	1	0
14	FW	(Spain) ESP	Manu del Moral	15	2	9+6	2	0	0
18	DF	(Algeria) ALG	Liassine Cadamuro	10	0	9	0	1	0
21	MF	(Spain) ESP	David Rocha	19	0	12+6	0	1	0
27	DF	(Venezuela) VEN	Josua Mejías	7	0	7	0	0	0
—	DF	(Spain) ESP	César Arzo	2	0	2	0	0	0

=== Top scorers ===
Place	Number	Position	Nation	Name	Segunda División	Copa del Rey	Total
1	26	FW	(Colombia)	Luis Suárez	7	0	7
2	8	FW	(Nigeria)	Ike Uche	5	0	5
3	4	MF	(Spain)	Fali	3	0	3
3	11	FW	(Guinea)	José Kanté	3	0	3
4	9	DF	(Spain)	Raúl Albentosa	2	0	2
4	14	FW	(Spain)	Manu del Moral	2	0	2
5	6	MF	(Spain)	Javi Márquez	1	0	1
5	7	MF	(Spain)	Tete Morente	1	0	1
5	9	FW	(Finland)	Berat Sadik	1	0	1
5	11	FW	(Spain)	Manu Barreiro	1	0	1
5	16	MF	(Spain)	Imanol García	1	0	1
5	30	FW	(Spain)	Pol Prats	1	0	1
Own goals					1	0	1
TOTALS					29	0	29

=== Disciplinary record ===
Number	Nation	Position	Name	Segunda División			Copa del Rey			Total		
Number	Nation	Position	Name	Yellow card	(yellow card) (yellow-red card)	Red card	Yellow card	(yellow card) (yellow-red card)	Red card	Yellow card	(yellow card) (yellow-red card)	Red card
4	(Spain)	MF	Fali	11	1	1	0	0	0	11	1	1
5	(Senegal)	MF	Ousseynou Thioune	11	1	0	0	0	0	11	1	0
22	(Spain)	DF	Abraham Minero	11	0	0	0	0	0	11	0	0
26	(Colombia)	FW	Luis Suárez	7	1	0	1	0	0	8	1	0
6	(Spain)	MF	Javi Márquez	7	0	0	1	0	0	8	0	0
9	(Spain)	DF	Raúl Albentosa	5	0	0	0	0	0	5	0	0
21	(Spain)	MF	David Rocha	5	0	0	0	0	0	5	0	0
31	(Spain)	MF	Viti Martínez	5	0	0	0	0	0	5	0	0
7	(Spain)	MF	Tete Morente	4	1	0	0	0	0	4	1	0
8	(Nigeria)	FW	Ike Uche	4	0	0	0	0	0	4	0	0
11	(Spain)	FW	Manu Barreiro	4	0	0	0	0	0	4	0	0
16	(Spain)	MF	Imanol García	4	0	0	0	0	0	4	0	0
17	(Venezuela)	DF	Mikel Villanueva	4	0	0	0	0	0	4	0	0
24	(Cameroon)	DF	Mohammed Djetei	3	0	0	1	0	0	4	0	0
18	(Algeria)	DF	Liassine Cadamuro	3	1	0	0	0	0	3	1	0
21	(Argentina)	DF	Fabián Noguera	3	0	0	0	0	0	3	0	0
23	(Spain)	DF	Pol Valentín	1	1	0	1	0	0	2	1	0
1	(Spain)	GK	Isaac Becerra	2	0	0	0	0	0	2	0	0
10	(Spain)	MF	Omar Perdomo	2	0	0	0	0	0	2	0	0
11	(Guinea)	FW	José Kanté	2	0	0	0	0	0	2	0	0
15	(Spain)	DF	Pipa	2	0	0	0	0	0	2	0	0
18	(Spain)	MF	Antonio Cotán	2	0	0	0	0	0	2	0	0
27	(Venezuela)	DF	Josua Mejías	2	0	0	0	0	0	2	0	0
28	(Spain)	DF	Roger Figueras	2	0	0	0	0	0	2	0	0
12	(Italy)	MF	Nicolao Dumitru	1	0	0	1	0	0	2	0	0
5	(Spain)	DF	César Arzo	0	0	1	0	0	0	0	0	1
9	(Finland)	FW	Berat Sadik	1	0	0	0	0	0	1	0	0
13	(Spain)	GK	Bernabé Barragán	1	0	0	0	0	0	1	0	0
14	(Spain)	MF	Miguel Palanca	1	0	0	0	0	0	1	0	0
20	(Spain)	MF	Sebas Coris	1	0	0	0	0	0	1	0	0
27	(China)	MF	Bernard Sun	1	0	0	0	0	0	1	0	0
29	(Spain)	MF	Brugui	1	0	0	0	0	0	1	0	0
36	(Spain)	DF	Iván de Nova	0	0	0	1	0	0	1	0	0
TOTALS				113	6	2	6	0	0	119	6	2

== Competitions ==
=== Pre-season/Friendlies ===
18 July 2018	Gimnàstic	5 – 1	Pobla de Mafumet	Salou
18:30	Rodri 27'; Ralph; Brugui; Arzo	Report	28' Sergio Montero	Stadium: Complex Esportiu

21 July 2018	Gimnàstic	0 – 2	Peralada	Salou
19:00		Report	75' Mouha; 90+3' Quadri	Stadium: Complex Esportiu

25 July 2018	Valencia Mestalla	1 – 2	Gimnàstic	Paterna
19:00	Pablo Jiménez 90+1'	Report	5' 31' Suárez	Stadium: Ciudad Deportiva

28 July 2018 Ciutat de Tarragona	Gimnàstic	1 – 0	Zaragoza	Tarragona
20:30	Maikel 42'; Djetei (yellow card) 66'	Report		Stadium: Nou Estadi; Referee: Eduardo Prieto Iglesias

1 August 2018	Olot	0 – 1	Gimnàstic	Olot
		Report	(yellow card) 55' Mejías; 60' Uche	Stadium: Municipal; Attendance: 571; Referee: Albert Ávalos Martos

4 August 2018	Gimnàstic	3 – 0	Espanyol B	La Vall d'en Bas
18:30	Genís 71' (o.g.); Lluís López 80' (o.g.); Omar 82'	Report		Stadium: RoyalVerd Field; Referee: Oriol Jarid

8 August 2018	Gimnàstic	0 – 2	Espanyol	Tarragona
20:30	Uche (yellow card) 14'; Fali (red card) 67'; Rocha (yellow card) 67'; Arzo (yellow card) 76'	Report	41' Baptistão; (yellow card) 67' Víctor Sánchez; 75' Iglesias	Stadium: Nou Estadi; Referee: Rubén Ávalos Barrera

12 August 2018	Gimnàstic	3 – 0	Ascó	Tarragona
19:00	Omar 22'; Suárez 38'; Barreiro 79'	Report		Stadium: Nou Estadi; Referee: Gonzalo Romero Freixas

=== Copa Catalunya ===
21 November 2018 Semifinals	Vilafranca	0 – 0 (3–0 p)	Gimnàstic	Vilafranca del Penedès
19:45		Report		Stadium: Municipal; Referee: Hector Robas Bondia
	Penalties
	Oribe (penalty scored); Sierra (penalty scored); Rosillo (penalty scored)		(penalty missed) Omar; (penalty missed) Dumitru; (penalty missed) Morente

=== Segunda División ===
Pos	Team	Pld	W	D	L	GF	GA	GD	Pts	Promotion, qualification or relegation
18	Lugo	42	10	17	15	43	51	−8	47	
19	Rayo Majadahonda (R)	42	12	9	21	46	61	−15	45	Relegation to Segunda División B
20	Gimnàstic (R)	42	9	9	24	30	63	−33	36	Relegation to Segunda División B
21	Córdoba (R)	42	7	13	22	48	79	−31	34	Relegation to Segunda División B
22	Reus (Note: Reus were expelled after the end of the first half of the season due to unpaid wages. Their matches of the second half were given as 1–0 wins to their opponents.) (D)	42	5	6	31	16	48	−32	0	Expelled from the league by the Federation for financial issues

Source: La Liga
Rules for classification: 1) points; 2) head-to-head points; 3) head-to-head goal difference; 4) goal difference; 5) number of goals scored
(D) Disqualified; (R) Relegated

==== Results summary ====
Overall								Home						Away					
Pld	W	D	L	GF	GA	GD	Pts	W	D	L	GF	GA	GD	W	D	L	GF	GA	GD
42	9	9	24	30	63	−33	36	7	6	8	22	25	−3	2	3	16	8	38	−30

Last updated: 10 June 2019.
Source: Competitive matches

==== Results by round ====
Round	1	2	3	4	5	6	7	8	9	10	11	12	13	14	15	16	17	18	19	20	21	22	23	24	25	26	27	28	29	30	31	32	33	34	35	36	37	38	39	40	41	42
Ground	H	A	H	A	H	A	H	A	H	A	H	A	H	A	H	A	H	A	A	H	A	A	H	A	H	A	H	A	H	A	H	A	H	A	H	A	H	H	A	H	A	H
Result	D	L	L	L	W	D	L	D	L	L	W	L	L	L	D	L	L	W	L	W	L	L	D	L	W	D	L	L	W	L	L	L	W	L	D	L	L	W	L	D	W	D
Position	12	20	20	22	18	18	21	20	21	22	21	22	22	22	22	22	22	22	22	22	22	22	22	21	21	21	21	21	20	20	20	21	21	20	20	20	21	20	21	21	20	20

Updated to match(es) played on 10 June 2019. Source:
A = Away; H = Home; W = Win; D = Draw; L = Loss

==== Matches ====
20 August 2018 1	Gimnàstic	1 – 1	Tenerife	Tarragona
20:00	Fali 10' (yellow card) 46'; Abraham (yellow card) 63'; Rocha (yellow card) 80'; Mejías (yellow card) 89'; Márquez (yellow card) 90+7'	Report	(yellow card) 6' Camille; 90+4' Aveldaño; (yellow card) 90+7' Nano	Stadium: Nou Estadi; Attendance: 4,499; Referee: Saúl Ais Reig

26 August 2018 2	Sporting Gijón	2 – 0	Gimnàstic	Gijón
19:00	Đurđević (yellow card) 14'; Hernán 24' (yellow card) 70'; Álvaro (yellow card) 52'; Lod 81'		(yellow card) 25' Abraham	Stadium: El Molinón; Attendance: 21,484; Referee: David Pérez Pallas

2 September 2018 3	Gimnàstic	0 – 1	Rayo Majadahonda	Tarragona
12:00	Rocha (yellow card) 30'; Cadamuro (yellow card) 52' (yellow-red card) 73'; Fali (yellow card) 60'; Djetei (yellow card) 72'		(yellow card) 2' Iza; 83' Schiappacasse; (yellow card) 87' Galán	Stadium: Nou Estadi; Attendance: 4,027; Referee: Santiago Varón Aceitón

7 September 2018 4	Las Palmas	4 – 0	Gimnàstic	Las Palmas
20:00	Timor (yellow card) 28'; Maikel (yellow card) 32'; Castro 44' 63' de la Bella (yellow card) 50'; Albentosa 56' (pen.); Lemos 71'; Ruiz de Galarreta (yellow card) 81'; Pekhart (yellow card) 90+1'		(red card) 29' Arzo; (yellow card) 44' Abraham; (yellow card) 47' Omar	Stadium: Gran Canaria; Attendance: 12,132; Referee: Abraham Domínguez Cervantes

15 September 2018 5	Gimnàstic	1 – 0	Osasuna	Tarragona
16:00	Albentosa (yellow card) 5'; Abraham (yellow card) 17'; Manu 78'; Fali (yellow card) 86'		(yellow card) 28' Aridane	Stadium: Nou Estadi; Attendance: 4,576; Referee: Javier Iglesias Villanueva

23 September 2018 6	Reus	1 – 1	Gimnàstic	Reus
18:00	Linares (yellow card) 43' (goal) 51'; Villanueva (yellow card) 55'	Report	21' Albentosa; (yellow card) 39' Morente; (yellow card) 43' Fali; (yellow card) 85' Barreiro; (yellow card) 90+2' Cadamuro	Stadium: Municipal; Attendance: 4,194; Referee: Oliver de la Fuente Ramos

30 September 2018 7	Gimnàstic	1 – 3	Deportivo La Coruña	Tarragona
20:30	Morente 26' (yellow card) 79'	Report	33' 68' Quique; (yellow card) 56' Fernández; (yellow card) 70' Saúl; (yellow card) 72' Duarte; 86' Santos	Stadium: Nou Estadi; Attendance: 4,931; Referee: Víctor Areces Franco

7 October 2018 8	Cádiz	1 – 1	Gimnàstic	Cádiz
20:00	Álex 16' (pen.) (yellow card) 90'; Salvi (yellow card) 69'	Report	(yellow card) 15' Djetei; (yellow card) 22' Figueras; 33' Suárez; (yellow card) 42' Uche; (yellow card) 90+2' Omar	Stadium: Ramón de Carranza; Attendance: 12,514; Referee: Saúl Ais Reig

15 October 2018 9	Gimnàstic	1 – 3	Alcorcón	Tarragona
16:00	Rocha (yellow card) 17'; Uche (yellow card) 26'; Figueras (yellow card) 30'; Suárez (yellow card) 66' (yellow-red card) 86'; Manu 84'	Report	6' 13' Muñoz; (yellow card) 24' Eddy; 27' Nono; (yellow card) 81' Sangalli	Stadium: Nou Estadi; Attendance: 3,505; Referee: Daniel Jesús Trujillo Suárez
Note: Match started on 14 October, but was delayed to 15 October due to heavy rain

21 October 2018 10	Lugo	1 – 0	Gimnàstic	Lugo
16:00	Kravets (yellow card) 23'; Pita 42' (yellow card) 79'; Gil (yellow card) 45+1'; Vieira (yellow card) 47'; Josete (yellow card) 48'; Campillo (yellow card) 90'	Report	(yellow card) 45+1' Becerra; (yellow card) 55' Fali	Stadium: Anxo Carro; Attendance: 3,203; Referee: José Antonio López Toca

28 October 2018 11	Gimnàstic	2 – 1	Oviedo	Tarragona
13:00	Suárez 21'; Márquez (yellow card) 26'; Coris (yellow card) 63'; Barreiro (yellow card) 74'; Albentosa (yellow card) 88' (goal) 90+3'	Report	64' (yellow card) 74' Ibrahima; (yellow card) 73' Bárcenas; (yellow card) 76' (yellow-red card) 81' Folch	Stadium: Nou Estadi; Attendance: 4,631; Referee: Aitor Gorostegui Fernández Ortega

2 November 2018 12	Albacete	2 – 0	Gimnàstic	Albacete
22:00	Albentosa 16' (o.g.); Zozulya 21'	Report	(yellow card) 36' Brugui; (yellow card) 70' Cadamuro	Stadium: Carlos Belmonte; Attendance: 7,099; Referee: Santiago Varón Aceitón

12 November 2018 13	Gimnàstic	1 – 3	Zaragoza	Tarragona
21:00	Fali 4'; Albentosa (yellow card) 13'; Suárez (yellow card) 52'; Mejías (yellow card) 59'; Rocha (yellow card) 64'	Report	32' (o.g.) Djetei; (yellow card) 45+1' Nieto; (yellow card) 59' Gual; 65' Biel; (yellow card) 67' Pombo; (yellow card) 83' Álvarez; 90+1' Álvaro	Stadium: Nou Estadi; Attendance: 3,698; Referee: Luis Mario Milla Alvendiz

17 November 2018 14	Málaga	2 – 0	Gimnàstic	Málaga
16:00	Blanco (yellow card) 13'; Koné 25'; N'Diaye (yellow card) 34'; Ontiveros (yellow card) 89'; Adrián 90+2'	Report	(yellow card) 53' (yellow-red card) 75' Morente; (yellow card) 73' Dumitru	Stadium: La Rosaleda; Attendance: 17,256; Referee: Álvaro Moreno Aragón

24 November 2018 15	Gimnàstic	2 – 2	Almería	Tarragona
16:00	Imanol 3'; Márquez (yellow card) 20'; Suárez (yellow card) 45+2'; Albentosa (yellow card) 56'; Barreiro 64'; Fali (yellow card) 90+4'		38' 43' Owona; (yellow card) 63' López; (yellow card) 68' Eteki; (yellow card) 87' (yellow-red card) 89' Juan Carlos	Stadium: Nou Estadi; Attendance: 6,514; Referee: Valentín Pizarro Gómez

2 December 2018 16	Numancia	3 – 0	Gimnàstic	Soria
18:00	Higinio 56'; Albentosa 63' (o.g.); Nacho 76'; Medina (yellow card) 85'		(yellow card) 23' Rocha; (yellow card) 61' Imanol	Stadium: Los Pajaritos; Attendance: 3,002; Referee: Saúl Ais Reig

8 December 2018 17	Gimnàstic	0 – 1	Granada	Tarragona
16:00	Barreiro (yellow card) 61'; Suárez (yellow card) 77'; Albentosa (yellow card) 90+2'		(yellow card) 27' San Emeterio; 35' Pozo; (yellow card) 51' Montoro	Stadium: Nou Estadi; Attendance: 8,625; Referee: Gorka Sagues Oscoz

16 December 2018 18	Extremadura	0 – 1	Gimnàstic	Soria
18:00	Fausto (yellow card) 30'; Rennella (yellow card) 43'; Pardo (yellow card) 47'; Olabe (yellow card) 67'; Díez (yellow card) 76'		(yellow card) 6' Viti; (yellow card) 45+1' Márquez; 70' Suárez; (yellow card) 88' Imanol; (yellow card) 90+1' Barreiro	Stadium: Los Pajaritos; Attendance: 10,704; Referee: Iñaki Bikandi Garrido

21 December 2018 19	Mallorca	2 – 0	Gimnàstic	Palma
21:00	Estupiñán 31'; Pedraza (yellow card) 48'; Stoichkov 84'	Report	(yellow card) 19' Viti; (yellow card) 82' Fali	Stadium: Son Moix; Attendance: 5,877; Referee: Jorge Figueroa Vázquez

6 January 2019 20	Gimnàstic	1 – 0	Córdoba	Tarragona
17:00	Bernabé (yellow card) 33'; Thioune (yellow card) 52'; Fali 59'	Report	(yellow card) 33' Romero; (yellow card) 41' Aguado; (red card) 57' de las Cuevas	Stadium: Nou Estadi; Attendance: 5,211; Referee: David Pérez Pallas

13 January 2019 21	Elche	1 – 0	Gimnàstic	Elche
20:00	Gonzalo (yellow card) 49'; Iván Sánchez 59'; Manuel (yellow card) 71'; Cruz (yellow card) 90+3'	Report	(red card) 29' Fali; (yellow card) 71' Suárez; (yellow card) 83' Thioune; (yellow card) 90' Abraham	Stadium: Manuel Martínez Valero; Attendance: 7,249; Referee: Javier Iglesias Villanueva

20 January 2019 22	Tenerife	2 – 0	Gimnàstic	Santa Cruz de Tenerife
18:00	Santana 28'; Jorge 60'	Report	(yellow card) 26' Tete; (yellow card) 78' Villanueva	Stadium: Heliodoro Rodríguez López; Attendance: 11,426; Referee: Santiago Varón Aceitón

27 January 2019 23	Gimnàstic	0 – 0	Las Palmas	Tarragona
20:00	Viti (yellow card) 20'; Thioune (yellow card) 36' (yellow-red card) 70'; Salva (yellow card) 45+2'		(yellow card) 46' Maikel; (yellow card) 60' Mantovani; (yellow card) 90+2' Araujo	Stadium: Nou Estadi; Attendance: 3,392; Referee: Luis Mario Milla Alvendiz

2 February 2019 24	Rayo Majadahonda	1 – 0	Gimnàstic	Majadahonda
18:00	Luso 15' (yellow card) 88'; Valentín (yellow card) 51'; Iza (yellow card) 90'		(yellow card) 21' (yellow-red card) 73' Fali; (yellow card) 23' Pipa; (yellow card) 83' Cotán	Stadium: Cerro del Espino; Attendance: 3,054; Referee: Iñaki Bikandi Garrido

9 February 2019 25	Gimnàstic	1 – 0	Reus	Tarragona
16:00				Stadium: Nou Estadi
Note: Awarded a 1–0 win to every Reus' opponent after the club's exclusion from the league by the LFP.

16 February 2019 26	Deportivo La Coruña	1 – 1	Gimnàstic	A Coruña
16:00	Expósito 49'; Moreno (yellow card) 71'		(yellow card) 25' Márquez; (yellow card) 28' Cotán; (yellow card) 62' Thioune; 84' Suárez	Stadium: Riazor; Attendance: 17,106; Referee: César Soto Grado

23 February 2019 27	Gimnàstic	2 – 3	Cádiz	Tarragona
18:00	Salva (yellow card) 15'; Suárez 19' (yellow card) 90+1'; Kanté (yellow card) 37' (goal) 57' (pen.); Thioune (yellow card) 70'; Noguera (yellow card) 80'		14' Machís; 34' (o.g.) Kanté; 51' Vallejo; (yellow card) 53' Rober	Stadium: Nou Estadi; Attendance: 5,299; Referee: Jorge Valdés Aller

2 March 2019 28	Osasuna	1 – 0	Gimnàstic	Pamplona
18:00	Torres 39'		(yellow card) 20' Sadik; (yellow card) 65' Abraham; (yellow card) 81' Viti	Stadium: El Sadar; Attendance: 15,389; Referee: José Antonio López Toca

9 March 2019 29	Gimnàstic	1 – 0	Albacete	Tarragona
20:00	Thioune (yellow card) 74'; Sadik 90+4' (pen.)		(yellow card) 47' Torres; (yellow card) 54' Zozulya; (yellow card) 90+1' Susaeta; (yellow card) 90+2' Herrera	Stadium: Nou Estadi; Attendance: 4,118; Referee: Daniel Ocón Arráiz

17 March 2019 30	Oviedo	2 – 0	Gimnàstic	Oviedo
12:00	Viti (yellow card) 51'; Joselu 53'; Christian 80'		(yellow card) 41' Villanueva; (yellow card) 45+1' Fali	Stadium: Carlos Tartiere; Attendance: 12,430; Referee: Valentín Pizarro Gómez

24 March 2019 31	Gimnàstic	0 – 1	Málaga	Tarragona
16:00	Pipa (yellow card) 32'		(yellow card) 63' Alejo; (yellow card) 72' Adrián; 72' (yellow card) 83' Pacheco	Stadium: Nou Estadi; Attendance: 6,212; Referee: Juan Luis Pulido Santana

1 April 2019 32	Zaragoza	3 – 0	Gimnàstic	Zaragoza
21:00	Verdasca 4'; Biel 20'; Linares (yellow card) 25'; Delmás 41' (yellow card) 61'; Soro (yellow card) 50'; Igbekeme (yellow card) 73'		(yellow card) 45+1' Thioune; (yellow card) 52' Imanol	Stadium: La Romareda; Attendance: 14,809; Referee: Gorka Sagués Oscoz

7 April 2019 33	Gimnàstic	2 – 0	Numancia	Tarragona
18:00	Uche 4' (yellow card) 69'; Thioune (yellow card) 22'; Abraham (yellow card) 27'; Palanca (yellow card) 34'; Fali (yellow card) 61'; Kanté 90+4'		(penalty missed) 18' David Rodríguez; (yellow card) 90+3' Atienza	Stadium: Nou Estadi; Attendance: 3,459; Referee: Iñaki Bikandi Garrido

13 April 2019 34	Almería	3 – 0	Gimnàstic	Almería
18:00	Álvaro 35' 43'; Juan Carlos 51'; René (yellow card) 64'		(yellow card) 23' Noguera	Stadium: Juegos Mediterráneos; Attendance: 6,187; Referee: Víctor Areces Franco

20 April 2019 35	Gimnàstic	0 – 0	Sporting Gijón	Tarragona
18:00	Villanueva (yellow card) 26'; Fali (yellow card) 42'; Márquez (yellow card) 90+3'		(yellow card) 51' Ivi	Stadium: Nou Estadi; Attendance: 3,112; Referee: Óliver de la Fuente Ramos

28 April 2019 36	Granada	2 – 0	Gimnàstic	Granada
18:00	Víctor Díaz 8'; Rodri 45+2'; Germán (yellow card) 51'		(yellow card) 42' Josema; (yellow card) 44' Suárez; (yellow card) 83' Kanté	Stadium: Los Cármenes; Attendance: 12,489; Referee: César Soto Grado

4 May 2019 37	Gimnàstic	0 – 1	Extremadura	Tarragona
18:00	Villanueva (yellow card) 18'; Abraham (yellow card) 38'; Thioune (yellow card) 69'		(yellow card) 71' Pardo; 83' Ortuño; (yellow card) 87' Nando	Stadium: Nou Estadi; Attendance: 3,522; Referee: Javier Iglesias Villanueva

11 May 2019 38	Gimnàstic	2 – 1	Mallorca	Tarragona
16:00	Abraham (yellow card) 11'; Uche (yellow card) 14' (penalty missed) 40' 42'; Thioune (yellow card) 18'; Noguera (yellow card) 47'; Becerra (yellow card) 86'; Viti (yellow card) 89'; Kanté 90+3'		(yellow card) 25' Xisco Campos; (yellow card) 78' Lago Junior; 90' Abdón	Stadium: Nou Estadi; Attendance: 2,865; Referee: Abraham Domínguez Cervantes

19 May 2019 39	Córdoba	4 – 3	Gimnàstic	Córdoba
20:00	Lara 20'; Andrés Martín 22'; Alfaro 27' (yellow card) 34' (goal) 61'; Carbonell (yellow card) 66'; Muñoz (yellow card) 68'		(yellow card) 19' Abraham; (yellow card) 32' Thioune; 63' Uche; (yellow card) 66' Imanol; 88' Prats; 90' Suárez	Stadium: Nuevo Arcángel; Attendance: 2,986; Referee: Óliver de la Fuente Ramos

26 May 2019 40	Gimnàstic	3 – 3	Elche	Tarragona
16:00	Uche 79'; Lozano 83' (o.g.); Suárez 84'; Valentín (yellow card) 87' (yellow-red card) 90+1'		31' Torres; 49' Castro; (yellow card) 53' (yellow-red card) 59' Cruz; 69' Josan; (yellow card) 90' Borja; (yellow card) 90+3' Iván Sánchez	Stadium: Nou Estadi; Attendance: 2,042; Referee: Álvaro Moreno Aragón

1 June 2019 41	Alcorcón	0 – 1	Gimnàstic	Alcorcón
19:00	Sangalli (yellow card) 45+2'		8' (yellow card) 45' Márquez	Stadium: Santo Domingo; Attendance: 1,894; Referee: David Pérez Pallas

9 June 2019 42	Gimnàstic	1–1	Lugo	Tarragona
18:30	Abraham (yellow card) 33'; Djetei (yellow card) 46'; Uche 64'; Sun (yellow card) 83'	Report	(yellow card) 38' Muñiz; (yellow card) 55' Lebedenko; 63' Herrera; (yellow card) 65' Pita; (yellow card) 90+4' Campillo	Stadium: Nou Estadi; Attendance: 2,526; Referee: José Antonio López Toca

=== Copa del Rey ===
12 September 2018 2nd round	Córdoba	2 – 0	Gimnàstic	Córdoba
22:00	Andrés Martín 4' (yellow card) 45+2'; Loureiro (yellow card) 12'; Piovaccari 90+2'		(yellow card) 19' Djetei; (yellow card) 31' Dumitru; (yellow card) 42' Márquez; (yellow card) 54' De Nova; (yellow card) 55' Valentín; (yellow card) 86' Suárez	Stadium: Nuevo Arcángel; Referee: Dámaso Arcediano Monescillo
