= 2017–18 CD Lugo season =

CD Lugo
2017–18 season
- Manager: Francisco
- Stadium: Anxo Carro
- Segunda División: 12th
- Copa del Rey: Third round
- Top goalscorer: League: Cristian Herrera (7); All: Cristian Herrera (7)
- Highest home attendance: 23,905 vs Sporting Gijón (27 August 2017)
- Lowest home attendance: 919 vs Sevilla Atlético (3 December 2017)
Home colours

During the 2017–18 season, CD Lugo participated in the Segunda División and the Copa del Rey.

== Squad ==
As of 2 September 2017

Note: Flags indicate national team as defined under FIFA eligibility rules; some limited exceptions apply. Players may hold more than one non-FIFA nationality.

No.	Pos.	Nation	Player
1	GK	ESP	Juan Carlos
2	DF	CMR	Serge Leuko
3	DF	UKR	Vasyl Kravets
4	DF	ESP	Josete
5	MF	ESP	Carlos Pita (2nd captain)
6	DF	ESP	Bernardo Cruz
7	MF	ESP	Adrià Carmona
8	MF	ESP	Fernando Seoane (3rd captain)
9	FW	ESP	Mario Barco
10	MF	ESP	Antonio Campillo
11	MF	ESP	Fede Vico
12	MF	NGR	Ramon Azeez
13	GK	ESP	Roberto
15	DF	ESP	Luis Ruiz

No.	Pos.	Nation	Player
16	FW	ESP	Cristian Herrera
17	DF	ESP	Luis Muñoz (on loan from Málaga)
19	FW	PAR	Sergio Díaz (on loan from Real Madrid)
20	DF	ESP	Ignasi Miquel
21	MF	ESP	Sergio Gil
22	DF	ESP	Edu Campabadal
23	MF	ESP	Guille Donoso
24	MF	ESP	Iriome (4th captain)
26	GK	ESP	Pablo Cacharrón
27	DF	ESP	Pedro López
28	FW	ESP	Dani Escriche
—	FW	ARG	Francisco Fydriszewski (on loan from Newell's Old Boys)
—	FW	URU	Nicolás Albarracín (on loan from Peñarol)

== Transfers ==
=== In ===
Date	Player	From	Type	Fee	Ref
13 June 2017	(Ukraine) Vasyl Kravets	(Ukraine) Karpaty Lviv	Transfer	Undisclosed	
30 June 2017	(Spain) Keko Vilariño	(Spain) Somozas	Loan return	Free	
30 June 2017	(Spain) Dani Pedrosa	(Spain) Somozas	Loan return	Free	
30 June 2017	(Spain) Mario Barco	(Spain) Pontevedra	Loan return	Free	
30 June 2017	(Spain) Manu Cedrón	(Spain) Castro	Loan return	Free	
30 June 2017	(Cameroon) Lionel Enguene	(Portugal) Leixões	Loan return	Free	
1 July 2017	(Spain) Juan Carlos	(Spain) Elche	Transfer	Free	
1 July 2017	(Spain) Luis Ruiz	(Spain) Cádiz	Transfer	Free	
1 July 2017	(Spain) Josete	(Spain) Elche	Transfer	Free	
1 July 2017	(Spain) Guille Donoso	(Spain) Córdoba	Transfer	Free	
1 July 2017	(Spain) Bernardo	(Spain) Sevilla B	Transfer	Free	
1 July 2017	(Spain) Marcelo Djaló	(Italy) Juventus	Transfer	Free	
6 July 2017	(Spain) Edu Campabadal	(Spain) Mallorca	Transfer	Free	
13 July 2017	(Nigeria) Ramon Azeez	(Spain) Almería	Transfer	Free	
14 July 2017	(Spain) Cristian Herrera	(Spain) Girona	Transfer	Free	

=== Out ===
Date	Player	To	Type	Fee	Ref
30 June 2017	(Colombia) Brayan Perea	(Italy) Lazio	Loan return	Free	
30 June 2017	(Spain) Damià	(Spain) Mallorca	Loan return	Free	
30 June 2017	(Spain) Jordi Calavera	(Spain) Eibar	Loan return	Free	
1 July 2017	(Argentina) Maxi Rolón	TBD		Free	
1 July 2017	(Spain) Ángel Dealbert	TBD		Free	
1 July 2017	(Spain) Joselu	(Spain) Granada	Transfer	Free	
1 July 2017	(Spain) Carlos Hernández	(Spain) Oviedo	Transfer	Free	
1 July 2017	(Spain) José Juan	(Spain) Elche	Transfer	Free	
3 July 2017	(Spain) Marcelo Djaló	(England) Fulham	Transfer	€800K	
4 July 2017	(Switzerland) Manu	(Spain) Cultural Leonesa	Transfer	Free	
10 July 2017	(Spain) Igor Martínez	(Spain) Mirandés	Transfer	Free	
14 July 2017	(Spain) Yelko Pino	(Spain) Cultural Leonesa	Transfer	Free	
17 July 2017	(Argentina) Pablo Caballero	(Spain) Almería	Transfer	Free	
2 August 2017	(Spain) Dani Pedrosa	(Spain) Cerceda	Loan	Free	

== Competitions ==
=== Overall ===
Competition	Final position
Segunda División	-
Copa del Rey	-

=== Liga ===
==== League table ====
Pos	Team	Pld	W	D	L	GF	GA	GD	Pts
10	Granada	42	17	10	15	55	50	+5	61
11	Tenerife	42	15	14	13	58	50	+8	59
12	Lugo	42	15	10	17	39	48	−9	55
13	Alcorcón	42	12	16	14	37	42	−5	52 (Note: Alcorcón finished ahead of Reus and Gimnàstic on head-to-head points: Alcorcón 10 pts, Reus 5 pts, Gimnàstic 1 pt)
14	Reus	42	12	16	14	31	42	−11	52

Source: La Liga
Rules for classification: 1) points; 2) head-to-head points; 3) head-to-head goal difference; 4) goal difference; 5) number of goals scored

==== Matches ====
Kickoff times are in CET. Win Draw Loss

Match	Opponent	Venue	Result
1	Reus	H	0–0
2	Sporting Gijón	A	2–0
3	Cadiz	H	0–1
4	Albacete	A	0–1
5	Real Zaragoza	H	2–1
6	Barcelona B	A	1-2
7	Tenerife	H	0-1
8	Granada	A	2-0
9	Cordoba	H	2-0
10	Alcorcón	A	0-1
11	Real Valladolid	A	2-2
12	Gimnàstic	H	1-0
13	Real Oviedo	A	3-2
14	Numancia	H	0-1
15	Lorca	A	1-2
16	Osasuna	H	1-0
17	Sevilla Atl.	A	1-1
18	Cultural	H	3-1
19	Huesca	A	3-0
20	Rayo	H	1-2
21	Almería	A	1-0

Match	Opponent	Venue	Result
22	Reus	A	0-1
23	Sporting Gijón	H	3-1
24	Cadiz CF	A	1-1
25	Albaceta	H	1-1
26	Real Zaragoza	A	0-1
27	Barcelona B	H	1-2
28	Tenerife	A	3-1
29	Granada	H	2-1
30	Córdoba	A	1-0
31	Alcorcón	H	2-1
32	Real Valladolid	H	0-0
33	Gimnastìc	A	3-0
34	Real Oviedo	H	0-1
35	Numancia	A	2-0
36	Lorca	H	1-1
37	Osasuna	A	1-1
38	Sevilla Atl.	H	1-0
39	Cultural	A	1-1
40	Huesca	H	0-2
41	Rayo	A	1-0
42	Almeria	H	1-1
