= 2015–16 CD Lugo season =

CD Lugo
2015–16 season
- Owner: Tino Saqués
- President: Tino Saqués
- Head coach: Luis Milla (until 24 February); José Durán (from 25 February)
- Stadium: Anxo Carro
- Segunda División: 14th
- Copa del Rey: Third round
- Top goalscorer: League: Pablo Caballero (12); All: Pablo Caballero (12)
Home colours	Away colours	Third colours

The 2015–16 season was the 63rd season in the existence of CD Lugo and the club's fourth consecutive season in the second division of Spanish football. In addition to the domestic league, CD Lugo participated in this season's edition of the Copa del Rey.

== Players ==
=== First-team squad ===
As of 2 September 2015

Note: Flags indicate national team as defined under FIFA eligibility rules; some limited exceptions apply. Players may hold more than one non-FIFA nationality.

No.	Pos.	Nation	Player
1	GK	ESP	José Juan
2	DF	ESP	David de Coz
3	DF	ESP	Fernando Vega
4	DF	ESP	Isra Puerto
5	MF	ESP	Carlos Pita
6	DF	ESP	Carlos Hernández
7	MF	ESP	David Ferreiro
8	MF	ESP	Fernando Seoane
9	FW	ARG	Pablo Caballero
10	FW	ESP	Antonio Campillo
11	DF	ESP	Manu (captain)

No.	Pos.	Nation	Player
13	GK	ESP	Roberto
14	MF	ESP	Álvaro Lemos
15	MF	ESP	David López
17	MF	ESP	Abel Molinero
18	MF	ESP	Sergio Marcos (on loan from Villarreal)
19	MF	ESP	Igor Martínez
21	FW	ESP	Joselu
22	DF	ESP	Pau Cendrós
23	FW	ESP	Jonathan Pereira
24	MF	ESP	Iriome
25	DF	ESP	Ángel Dealbert

=== Out on loan ===
Note: Flags indicate national team as defined under FIFA eligibility rules; some limited exceptions apply. Players may hold more than one non-FIFA nationality.

No.	Pos.	Nation	Player
—	GK	ESP	Manu Cedrón (on loan at Somozas)
—	DF	ESP	Julio Camba (on loan at Somozas)
—	DF	CMR	Serge Leuko (on loan at Somozas)

No.	Pos.	Nation	Player
—	MF	ESP	Keko Vilariño (on loan at Somozas)
—	FW	ESP	Dani Pedrosa (on loan at Somozas)
—	FW	ESP	Mario Barco (on loan at Somozas)

== Pre-season and friendlies ==
Win Draw Loss Fixtures

25 July 2015 Friendly	Lugo (Spain)	1–0	(Spain) Deportivo La Coruña	Lugo, Spain
19:30 CEST (UTC+2)				Stadium: Anxo Carro

2 September 2015 Friendly	Deportivo La Coruña (Spain)	2–2	(Spain) Lugo	A Coruña, Spain
20:30 CEST (UTC+2)				Stadium: Estadio Riazor

== Competitions ==
=== Overall record ===
Competition	First match	Last match	Starting round	Final position	Record							
Competition	First match	Last match	Starting round	Final position	Pld	W	D	L	GF	GA	GD	Win %
Segunda División	23 August 2015	4 June 2016	Matchday 1	6th	42	13	15	14	44	50	−6	30.95
Copa del Rey	9 September 2015	15 October 2015	Second round	Third round	2	1	0	1	1	1	+0	50.00
Total					44	14	15	15	45	51	−6	31.82

Last updated: 4 June 2016
Source: Soccerway

=== Segunda División ===
==== League table ====
Pos	Team	Pld	W	D	L	GF	GA	GD	Pts
12	Huesca	42	14	13	15	48	49	−1	55 (Note: Huesca ahead of Tenerife on goals scored; Huesca 48, Tenerife 45)
13	Tenerife	42	13	16	13	45	46	−1	55
14	Lugo	42	13	15	14	44	50	−6	54
15	Mirandés	42	13	13	16	55	56	−1	52
16	Valladolid	42	12	15	15	47	52	−5	51

Source: LFP
Rules for classification: 1) points; 2) head-to-head points; 3) head-to-head goal difference; 4) goal difference; 5) number of goals scored

==== Results summary ====
Overall								Home						Away					
Pld	W	D	L	GF	GA	GD	Pts	W	D	L	GF	GA	GD	W	D	L	GF	GA	GD
0	0	0	0	0	0	0	0	0	0	0	0	0	0	0	0	0	0	0	0

Last updated: 4 June 2016.
Source: La Liga Adelante

==== Results by round ====
Round	1	2	3	4	5	6	7	8	9	10	11	12	13	14	15	16	17	18	19	20	21	22	23	24	25	26	27	28	29	30	31	32	33	34	35	36	37	38	39	40	41	42
Ground	A	H	A	H	A	H	A	H	H	A	H	A	H	A	H	A	H	A	H	A	H	H	A	H	A	H	A	H	A	A	H	A	H	A	H	A	H	A	H	A	H	A
Result	D	W	D	W	D	D	L	L	W	L	W	W	D	D	D	D	W	D	L	W	D	D	D	L	W	L	L	W	W	D	W	L	D	L	W	D	L	L	W	L	L	L
Position	11	6	9	4	6	6	8	14	11	12	10	5	6	8	9	11	8	9	10	8	9	10	10	12	12	12	14	12	10	11	8	10	11	13	11	11	13	14	11	13	13	14

Updated to match(es) played on 4 June 2016. Source: La Liga Adelante
A = Away; H = Home; W = Win; D = Draw; L = Loss

==== Matches ====
The league fixtures were announced on 14 July 2015.

23 August 2015 1	Oviedo	2–2	Lugo	Oviedo
--:-- CEST (UTC+2)

29 August 2015 2	Lugo	1–0	Llagostera	Lugo
--:-- CEST (UTC+2)				Stadium: Anxo Carro

5 September 2015 3	Mirandés	1–1	Lugo	Miranda de Ebro
--:-- CEST (UTC+2)

13 September 2015 4	Lugo	1–0	Almería	Lugo
--:-- CEST (UTC+2)				Stadium: Anxo Carro

19 September 2015 5	Leganés	0–0	Lugo	Leganés
--:-- CEST (UTC+2)

26 September 2015 6	Lugo	0–0	Zaragoza	Lugo
--:-- CEST (UTC+2)				Stadium: Anxo Carro

4 October 2015 7	Osasuna	4–0	Lugo	Pamplona
--:-- CEST (UTC+2)

11 October 2015 8	Lugo	1–2	Córdoba	Lugo
--:-- CEST (UTC+2)				Stadium: Anxo Carro

18 October 2015 9	Lugo	1–0	Alavés	Lugo
--:-- CEST (UTC+2)				Stadium: Anxo Carro

25 October 2015 10	Albacete	2–0	Lugo	Albacete
--:-- CEST (UTC+2)

31 October 2015 11	Lugo	2–0	Tenerife	Lugo
--:-- CEST (UTC+2)				Stadium: Anxo Carro

8 November 2015 12	Girona	0–1	Lugo	Girona
--:-- CEST (UTC+2)

14 November 2015 13	Lugo	1–1	Elche	Lugo
--:-- CEST (UTC+2)				Stadium: Anxo Carro

21 November 2015 14	Mallorca	1–1	Lugo	Palma
--:-- CET (UTC+1)

29 November 2015 15	Lugo	1–1	Valladolid	Lugo
--:-- CEST (UTC+2)				Stadium: Anxo Carro

5 December 2015 16	Alcorcón	1–1	Lugo	Alcorcón
--:-- CET (UTC+1)

12 December 2015 17	Lugo	3–1	Ponferradina	Lugo
--:-- CEST (UTC+2)				Stadium: Anxo Carro

21 December 2015 18	Bilbao Athletic	1–1	Lugo	Bilbao
--:-- CET (UTC+1)				Stadium: San Mamés

3 January 2016 19	Lugo	2–3	Numancia	Lugo
--:-- CEST (UTC+2)				Stadium: Anxo Carro

9 January 2016 20	Gimnàstic	1–2	Lugo	Tarragona
--:-- CEST (UTC+2)

17 January 2016 21	Lugo	1–1	Huesca	Lugo
--:-- CEST (UTC+2)				Stadium: Anxo Carro

23 January 2016 22	Lugo	2–2	Oviedo	Lugo
--:-- CEST (UTC+2)				Stadium: Anxo Carro

30 January 2016 23	Llagostera	0–0	Lugo	Llagostera
--:-- CEST (UTC+2)

7 February 2016 24	Lugo	1–4	Mirandés	Lugo
--:-- CEST (UTC+2)				Stadium: Anxo Carro

13 February 2016 25	Almería	0–2	Lugo	Almería
--:-- CEST (UTC+2)

20 February 2016 26	Lugo	1–2	Leganés	Lugo
--:-- CEST (UTC+2)				Stadium: Anxo Carro

28 February 2016 27	Zaragoza	3–1	Lugo	Zaragoza
--:-- CEST (UTC+2)

5 March 2016 28	Lugo	2–0	Osasuna	Lugo
--:-- CEST (UTC+2)				Stadium: Anxo Carro

13 March 2016 29	Córdoba	1–2	Lugo	Córdoba
--:-- CEST (UTC+2)

19 March 2016 30	Alavés	0–0	Lugo	Vitoria-Gasteiz
--:-- CEST (UTC+2)

27 March 2016 31	Lugo	2–1	Albacete	Lugo
--:-- CEST (UTC+2)				Stadium: Anxo Carro

3 April 2016 32	Tenerife	1–0	Lugo	Santa Cruz de Tenerife
--:-- CEST (UTC+2)

9 April 2016 33	Lugo	1–1	Girona	Lugo
--:-- CEST (UTC+2)				Stadium: Anxo Carro

16 April 2016 34	Elche	2–0	Lugo	Elche
--:-- CEST (UTC+2)

24 April 2016 35	Lugo	2–1	Mallorca	Lugo
--:-- CEST (UTC+2)				Stadium: Anxo Carro

1 May 2016 36	Valladolid	1–1	Lugo	Valladolid
--:-- CEST (UTC+2)

7 May 2016 37	Lugo	1–2	Alcorcón	Lugo
--:-- CEST (UTC+2)				Stadium: Anxo Carro

15 May 2016 38	Ponferradina	2–1	Lugo	Ponferrada
--:-- CEST (UTC+2)

22 May 2016 39	Lugo	2–0	Bilbao Athletic	Lugo
--:-- CEST (UTC+2)				Stadium: Anxo Carro

25 May 2016 40	Numancia	1–0	Lugo	Soria
--:-- CEST (UTC+2)

29 May 2016 41	Lugo	0–3	Gimnàstic	Lugo
--:-- CEST (UTC+2)				Stadium: Anxo Carro

4 June 2016 42	Huesca	1–0	Lugo	Huesca
--:-- CEST (UTC+2)

=== Copa del Rey ===
9 September 2015 Second round	Córdoba	0–1	Lugo	Córdoba
20:30 CEST (UTC+2)			Joselu 47'	Stadium: Nuevo Arcángel; Attendance: 11,853; Referee: Pizarro Gómez

15 October 2015 Third round	Ponferradina	1–0 (a.e.t.)	Lugo	Ponferrada
20:30 CEST (UTC+2)	Yuri 105'			Stadium: El Toralín; Attendance: 4,390; Referee: Areces Franco
