= 2016–17 CD Lugo season =

CD Lugo
2016–17 season
- Manager: Luis César
- Stadium: Anxo Carro
- Segunda División: 9th
Home colours

The 2016–17 season was the 64th season in CD Lugo ’s history.

== Squad ==
As of 2 February 2017

Note: Flags indicate national team as defined under FIFA eligibility rules; some limited exceptions apply. Players may hold more than one non-FIFA nationality.

No.	Pos.	Nation	Player
1	GK	(Spain) ESP	José Juan
2	DF	(Cameroon) CMR	Serge Leuko
3	DF	(Ukraine) UKR	Vasyl Kravets (on loan from Karpaty Lviv)
4	DF	(Spain) ESP	Marcelo
5	MF	(Spain) ESP	Carlos Pita (2nd captain)
6	DF	(Spain) ESP	Carlos Hernández
7	MF	(Spain) ESP	Igor Martínez
8	MF	(Spain) ESP	Fernando Seoane (3rd captain)
9	FW	(Argentina) ARG	Pablo Caballero
10	MF	(Spain) ESP	Antonio Campillo
11	DF	(Spain) ESP	Manu (captain)
12	FW	(Colombia) COL	Brayan Perea (on loan from Lazio)
13	GK	(Spain) ESP	Roberto

No.	Pos.	Nation	Player
14	MF	(Spain) ESP	Yelko Pino
15	DF	(Spain) ESP	Ángel Dealbert
16	MF	(Spain) ESP	Fede Vico
17	MF	(Argentina) ARG	Maxi Rolón
18	FW	(Spain) ESP	Joselu
19	MF	(Spain) ESP	Damià Sabater (on loan from Mallorca)
20	DF	(Spain) ESP	Ignasi Miquel
21	MF	(Spain) ESP	Sergio Gil
22	MF	(Spain) ESP	Adrià Carmona
23	DF	(Spain) ESP	Jordi Calavera (on loan from Eibar)
24	MF	(Spain) ESP	Iriome (4th captain)
29	GK	(Spain) ESP	Pablo Cacharrón

== Competitions ==
=== Overall ===
Competition	Final position
Segunda División	9th
Copa del Rey	2nd round

=== Liga ===
==== League table ====
Pos	Team	Pld	W	D	L	GF	GA	GD	Pts
7	Valladolid	42	18	9	15	52	47	+5	63 (Note: Huesca finished ahead of Valladolid on head-to-head points: Valladolid 1–2 Huesca, Huesca 1–0 Valladolid)
8	Oviedo	42	17	10	15	47	47	0	61
9	Lugo	42	14	13	15	49	52	−3	55 (Note: Lugo and Córdoba finished ahead of Reus on head-to-head points: Lugo 7 pts, Córdoba 7 pts, Reus 3 pts. Lugo finished ahead of Córdoba on head-to-head points: Córdoba 3–3 Lugo, Lugo 1–0 Córdoba)
10	Córdoba	42	14	13	15	42	52	−10	55
11	Reus	42	13	16	13	31	29	+2	55

Source: La Liga
Rules for classification: 1) points; 2) head-to-head points; 3) head-to-head goal difference; 4) goal difference; 5) number of goals scored
