= Guiu =

Guiu or Guiú (Catalan pronunciation: [ˈgiw]) is a Spanish-Catalan surname that may refer to the following notable people:

- Bernat Guiu (born 2000), Spanish football forward
- Emilia Guiú (1922–2004), Spanish-Mexican actress
- Marc Guiu (born 2006), Spanish football forward
