= Imanol García =

Spanish footballer

Personal information
- Full name: Imanol García Lugea
- Date of birth: 26 December 1995 (age 30)
- Place of birth: Ezcároz, Spain
- Height: 1.82 m (6 ft 0 in)
- Position: Central midfielder

Team information
- Current team: Persik Kediri
- Number: 4

Youth career
- San Juan

Senior career*
| Years | Team | Apps | (Gls) |
| 2014–2015 | San Juan | 32 | (0) |
| 2015–2017 | Osasuna B | 54 | (5) |
| 2016–2017 | Osasuna | 8 | (0) |
| 2017–2018 | Villarreal B | 33 | (1) |
| 2018–2019 | Osasuna | 3 | (0) |
| 2018–2019 | → Gimnàstic (loan) | 24 | (1) |
| 2019–2020 | Córdoba | 26 | (1) |
| 2020–2021 | Pontevedra | 25 | (2) |
| 2021–2025 | Alcoyano | 113 | (5) |
| 2025– | Persik Kediri | 39 | (4) |
- * Club domestic league appearances and goals as of 31 October 2026

Imanol García Lugea (born 26 December 1995) is a Spanish professional footballer who plays as a central midfielder for Super League (Indonesia) club Persik Kediri.

== Club career ==
Born in Ezcároz – Ezkaroze, Navarre, García made his senior debut with AD San Juan, starting in a 0–1 Tercera División home loss against CD Valle de Egüés. He scored his first goal on 2 November, the game's only in an away victory over CD Corellano.

García signed with CA Osasuna in 2015, being initially assigned to the reserves also in the fourth division. On 18 September 2016, he made his first-team – and La Liga – debut, starting in a 0–0 home draw with RC Celta de Vigo.

García played eight league matches for the main squad during that season, suffering relegation. On 30 June 2017, he rejected a renewal offer from the club, and joined Villarreal CF B two days later.

On 11 July 2018, García returned to Osasuna after agreeing to a two-year deal. On 20 November, he was loaned to fellow second division side Gimnàstic de Tarragona until the end of the campaign, as a replacement for the injured César Arzo. He scored his only goal as a professional on his debut for the Catalans, a 2–2 home draw against UD Almería.

García terminated his contract with Osasuna on 19 July 2019, and signed a one-year deal with Córdoba CF just hours later, reuniting with manager Enrique Martín. In the summer of 2020, he moved to Pontevedra CF also of the third tier.

== Personal life ==
García's older brother, Unai, was also a footballer. A defender, he also represented Osasuna.

== Career statistics ==
As of match played 20 March 2021

Appearances and goals by club, season and competition
| Club | Season | League | | | National Cup | | Other | | Total | |
| Club | Season | Division | Apps | Goals | Apps | Goals | Apps | Goals | Apps | Goals |
|---|---|---|---|---|---|---|---|---|---|---|
| San Juan | 2014–15 | Tercera División | 32 | 0 | — | | 4 (Note: Appearances in promotion playoffs) | 0 | 36 | 0 |
| Osasuna B | 2015–16 | Tercera División | 33 | 5 | — | | 5 | 0 | 38 | 5 |
| Osasuna B | 2016–17 | Segunda División B | 21 | 0 | — | | — | | 21 | 0 |
| Osasuna B | Total | | 54 | 5 | 0 | 0 | 5 | 0 | 59 | 5 |
| Osasuna | 2016–17 | La Liga | 8 | 0 | 2 | 0 | — | | 10 | 0 |
| Villarreal B | 2017–18 | Segunda División B | 33 | 1 | — | | 6 | 0 | 39 | 1 |
| Osasuna | 2018–19 | Segunda División | 3 | 0 | 0 | 0 | — | | 3 | 0 |
| Osasuna | Total | | 11 | 0 | 2 | 0 | 0 | 0 | 13 | 0 |
| Gimnàstic (loan) | 2018–19 | Segunda División | 24 | 1 | 0 | 0 | — | | 24 | 1 |
| Córdoba | 2019–20 | Segunda División B | 26 | 1 | 1 | 0 | — | | 27 | 1 |
| Pontevedra | 2020–21 | Segunda División B | 17 | 2 | 2 | 0 | — | | 19 | 2 |
| Career total | | | 197 | 10 | 5 | 0 | 15 | 0 | 217 | 10 |
