= A Pobra de San Xiao =

Parish and village in Láncara, Spain

A Pobra de San Xiao Puebla de San Julián (Spanish)
- Parroquia
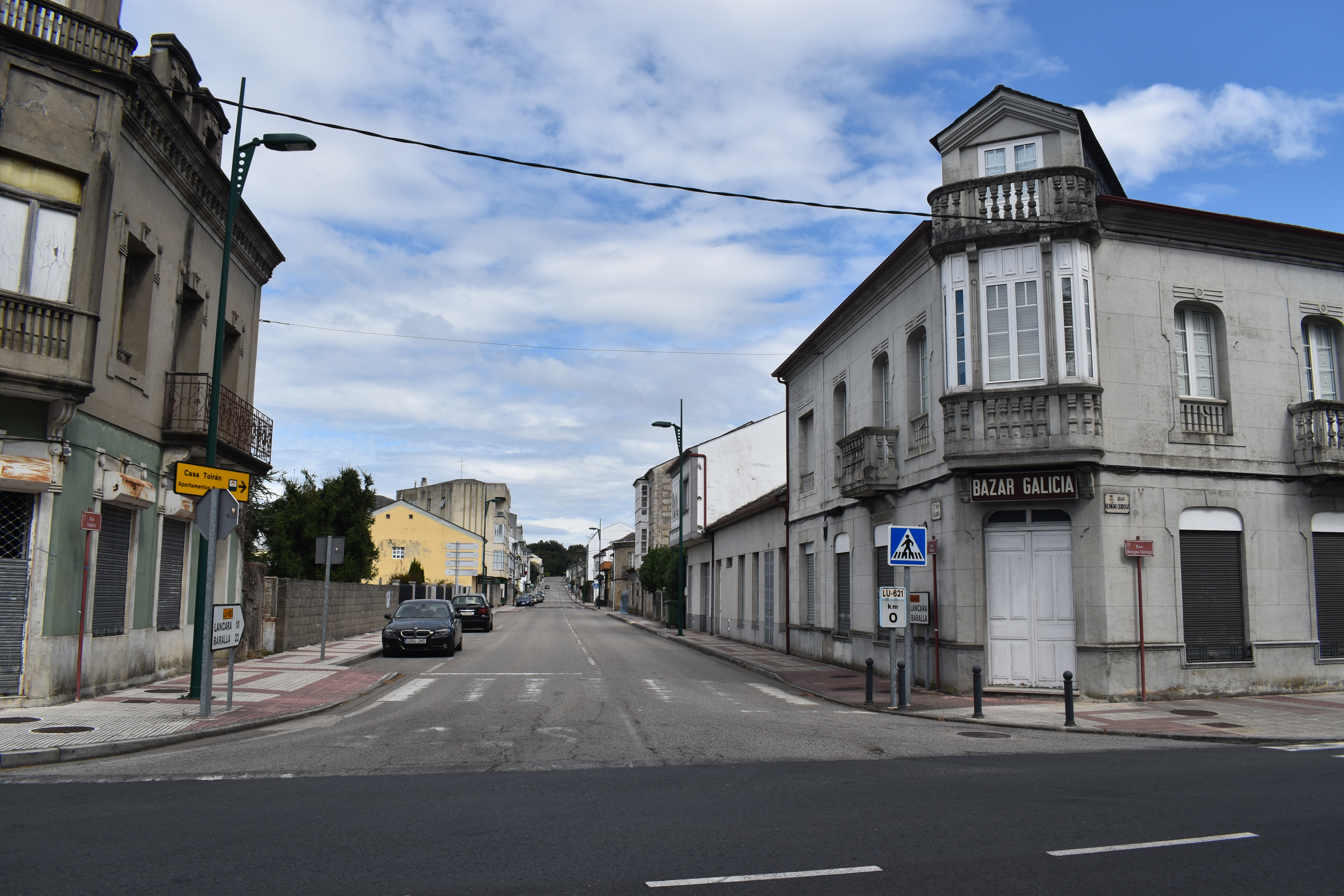
- A Pobra de San Xiao

- Location within Galicia Location within Spain
- Coordinates: 42.8654378°N 7.4347701°W
- Country: Spain
- Community: Galicia
- Province: Lugo
- Comarca: Sarria
- Municipality: Láncara

Population (2020)
  - Total: 769

A Pobra de San Xiao, known as Puebla de San Julián in Castilian Spanish, is a parroquia and village in the municipality of Láncara, within the province of Lugo, Galicia, Spain.

== Name ==
The village is officially known by the Galician name A Pobra de San Xiao. However, the village has previously been called both Pobra de San Xulián and Puebla de San Xulián. In Castilian Spanish, it is known as Puebla de San Julián.

== Sport ==
A Pobra de San Xiao is the birthplace of Antonio Doncel, a former professional footballer who spent most of his career with nearby Deportivo de La Coruña. Fellow footballer Keko was also born in the village. Between 1995 and 2006, a futsal team operated in the village. In 2004, ED Láncara reached the División de Honor, the top division of Spanish futsal, staying there until their dissolution two years later.

== Gallery ==
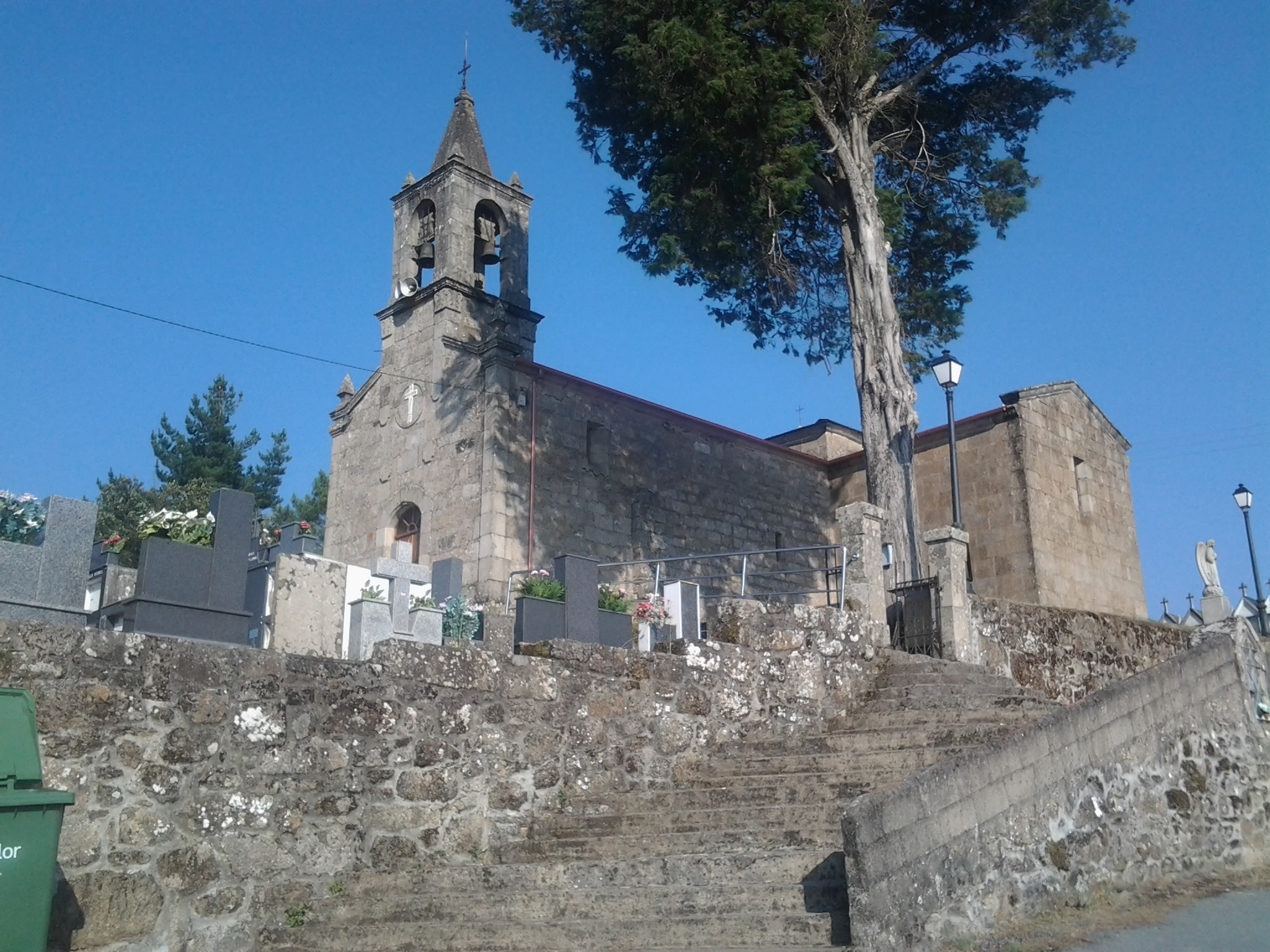
The Church

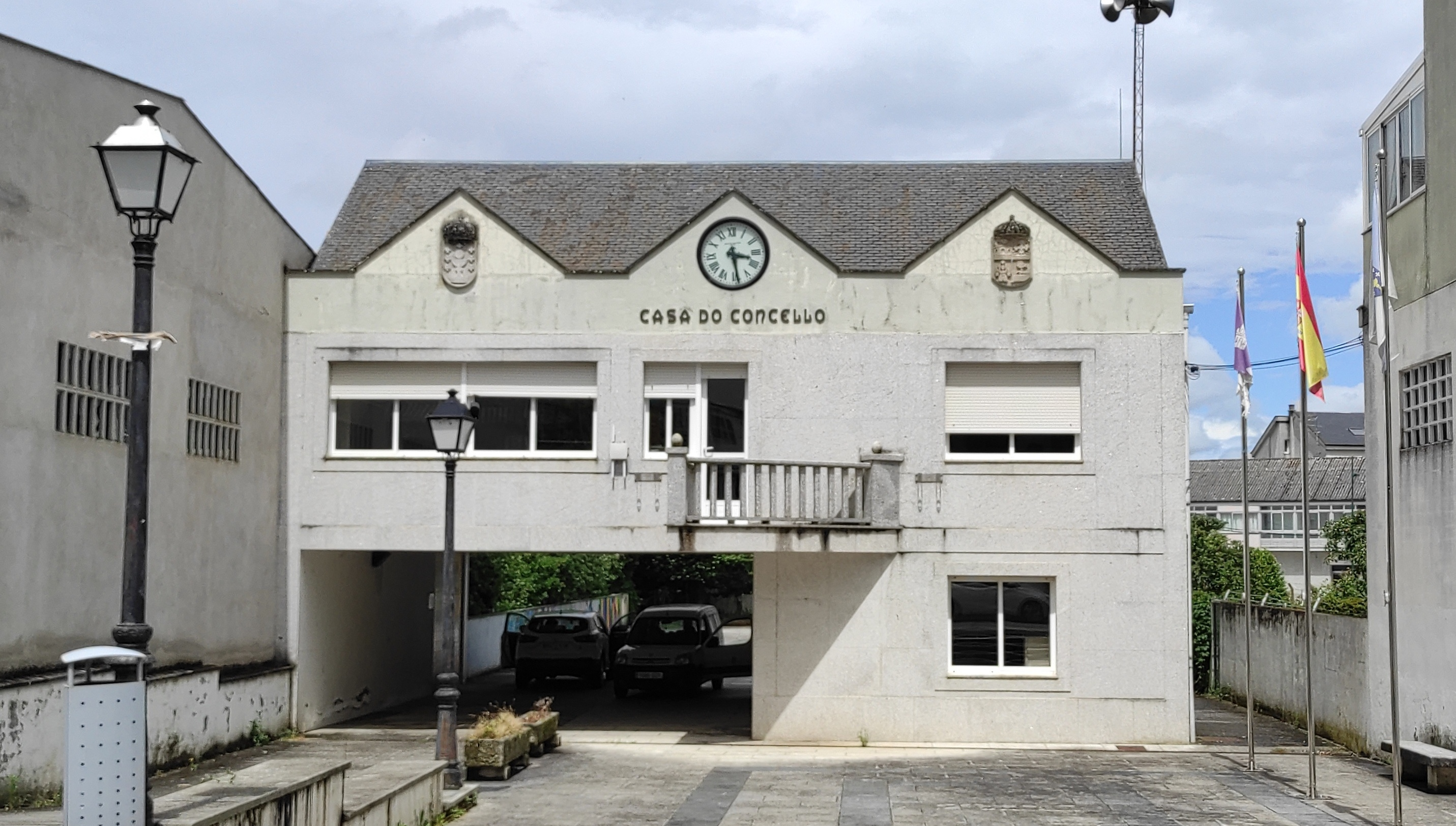
The Town Hall

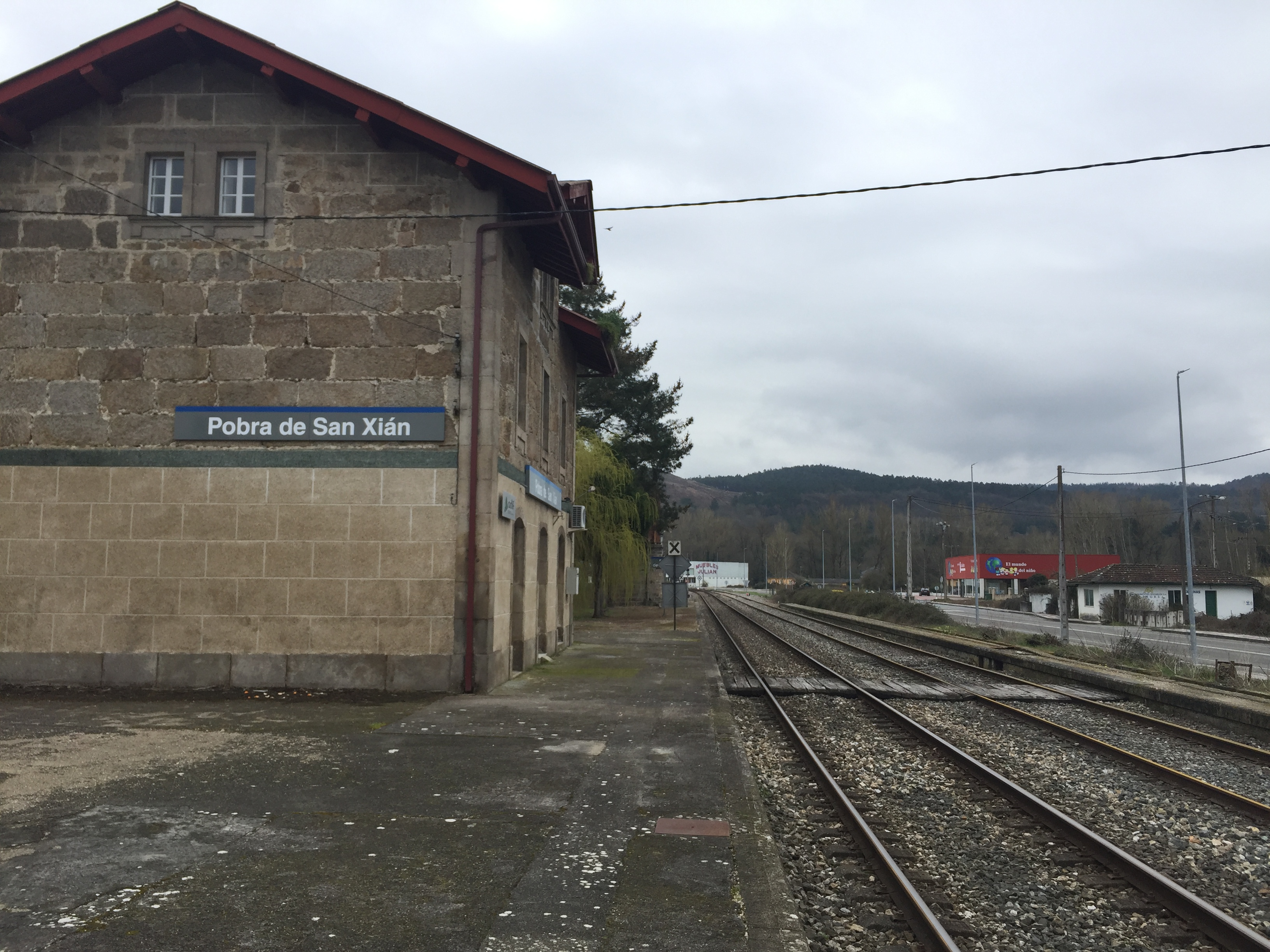
The Train Station

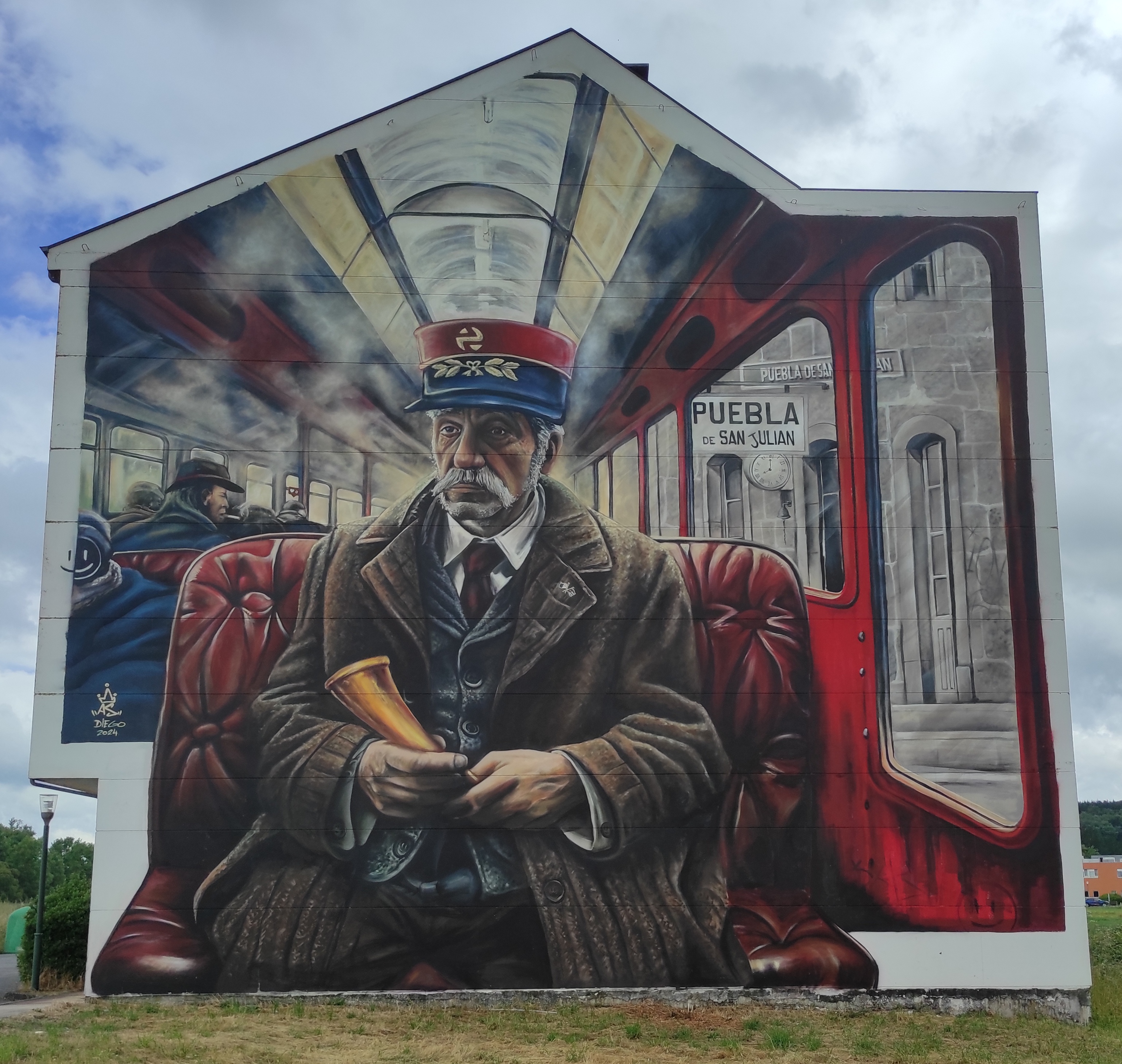
A mural depicting the village's connection to the railway industry
