= Uxío Marcos =

Spanish footballer

Personal information
- Full name: Uxío Adrián Marcos Nores
- Date of birth: 11 January 1993 (age 33)
- Place of birth: A Coruña, Spain
- Height: 1.80 m (5 ft 11 in)
- Position: Centre-back

Youth career
- Deportivo La Coruña

Senior career*
Years	Team	Apps	(Gls)
2011–2014	Deportivo B	72	(0)
2013–2014	Deportivo La Coruña	2	(0)
2014–2015	Córdoba B	30	(0)
2016	Ponferradina	0	(0)
2016	→ Atlético Astorga (loan)	13	(0)
2016–2017	Burgos	14	(0)
2017	La Roda	11	(2)
2017–2018	Cerceda	7	(0)
Total		149	(2)

International career
2010	Spain U17	2	(0)
- * Club domestic league appearances and goals

Uxío Adrián Marcos Nores (born 11 January 1993) is a former Spanish footballer who plays as a centre-back.

== Club career ==
Born in Ourense, Galicia, Uxío was a youth product of local Deportivo de La Coruña. He made his debuts as a senior with the reserves, representing the side in both the third and fourth divisions.

Uxío made his official debut for the Galicians' first team on 8 September 2013, starting in a 0–1 home loss against Real Murcia. He left Dépor in June of the following year.

In August 2014 Uxío joined another reserve team, Córdoba CF B also in the third division.
