= Bernard Sun =

Chinese footballer

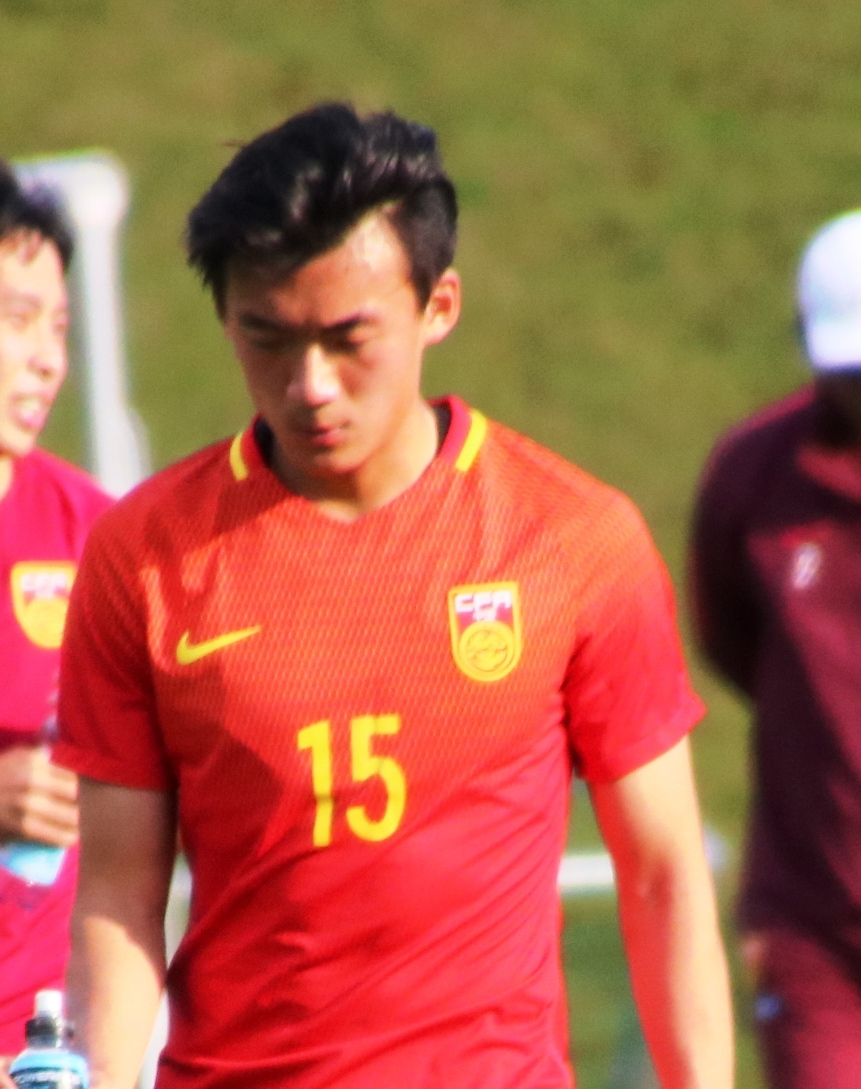
- Sun in 2018

Personal information
- Full name: Bernard Yipeng Sun
- Date of birth: 3 February 1999 (age 27)
- Place of birth: Shanghai, China
- Height: 1.72 m (5 ft 8 in)
- Position: Midfielder

Youth career
- TSV Laichingen
- TSV Blaustein
- SSV Ulm 1846
- FC Kaiserslautern
- 2015–2016: TuS Koblenz
- 2016: JFV Rhein-Hunstrück
- 2016–2017: Sportfreunde Eisbachtal

Senior career*
Years	Team	Apps	(Gls)
2017–2019	Estudiantes Murcia	28	(0)
2019	→ Gimnàstic (loan)	2	(0)
2019–2021	Birmingham City	0	(0)
2021–2022	Türk Gücü Friedberg	4	(0)
2022	FC Rot-Weiß Koblenz II	3	(0)

International career
- China U16
- China U18
- * Club domestic league appearances and goals as of 1 July 2022

Bernard Yipeng Sun (Chinese: 孙怡朋; pinyin: Sūn Yípéng; born 3 February 1999) is a Chinese footballer who plays as a midfielder.

== Club career ==
Born in Shanghai, Sun moved to Koblenz, Germany, at the age of seven and represented FC Kaiserslautern, TuS Koblenz, JFV Rhein-Hunstrück and Sportfreunde Eisbachtal as a youth. In 2017, after finishing his development, he moved to Spain after agreeing a contract with FC Jumilla and being assigned to their reserves, Estudiantes de Murcia CF of the Tercera División.

Sun made his senior debut on 24 September 2017, starting in a 3–1 away win against CD Minera. He scored his first goal the following 3 March, netting his team's third in a 5–3 success at CD Bala Azul.

On 30 January 2019, Sun was loaned to Segunda División side Gimnàstic de Tarragona until June, and was initially assigned to their farm team, CF Pobla de Mafumet, also a fourth-tier club. He made his professional debut on 26 May, coming on as a late substitute for Pol Prats in a 3–3 home draw with Elche CF in the Segunda División.

On 2 September 2019, Sun joined Birmingham City on a two-year deal. He made no first-team appearances, and in May 2021, Birmingham confirmed that he would leave the club when his contract expired at the end of the season.
