= Salva Ferrer =

Spanish footballer

Personal information
- Full name: Salvador Ferrer Canals
- Date of birth: 21 January 1998 (age 28)
- Place of birth: Sant Joan Samora, Spain
- Height: 1.84 m (6 ft 0 in)
- Position: Right-back

Youth career
- Espanyol
- Jàbac Terrassa
- Martorell
- 2016–2017: Damm

Senior career*
Years	Team	Apps	(Gls)
2015–2016	Martorell		
2017–2018	Pobla Mafumet	41	(2)
2018–2019	Gimnàstic	21	(0)
2019–2025	Spezia	80	(0)
2023–2024	→ Anorthosis (loan)	7	(1)
2025–2026	Europa	0	(0)

International career^{‡}
2022–2026	Catalonia	1	(0)
- * Club domestic league appearances and goals as of 3 February 2026 ‡ National team caps and goals as of 18:11, 3 February 2026 (UTC)

Salvador 'Salva' Ferrer Canals (born 21 January 1998) is a Spanish former professional footballer who last played as a right-back.

== Club career ==
Born in Sant Joan Samora, Barcelona, Catalonia, Ferrer represented RCD Espanyol, UFB Jàbac Terrassa, CF Martorell – where he made his senior debut in the Tercera Catalana – and CF Damm as a youth. On 10 July 2017, he signed a two-year contract with Gimnàstic de Tarragona, being assigned to the farm team in the Tercera División.

Ferrer made his debut for Pobla on 17 September 2017, coming on as a second-half substitute for Pol Valentín in a 1–0 home win against FC Vilafranca. He scored his first goal the following 22 April, netting the game's only in an away defeat of FC Santboià.

Ferrer made his professional debut on 7 October 2018, replacing Roger Figueras in a 1–1 away draw against Cádiz CF in the Segunda División. The following 21 January, after establishing himself as a starter under Enrique Martín, he renewed his contract until 2021.

On 9 August 2019, Ferrer was transferred to Italian Serie B side Spezia Calcio, and signed a four-year deal with the club.

In late 2023, Ferrer was diagnosed with Hodgkin lymphoma and started treatment. He was registered with Serie B as a Spezia player and assigned a shirt number for the 2024–25 season. He made a short substitute appearance in the last match of the season, as his contract expired and he became a free agent.

On 13 July 2025, Ferrer signed with CE Europa in Primera Federación. However, he was unable to make his debut for Europa due to injuries.

On February 3, 2026, Ferrer announced his retirement as a professional footballer due to hip surgery needed to alleviate the physical pain caused by his lymphoma.

== Career statistics ==
As of match played 19 October 2023

Club	Season	League			Cup		Continental		Other		Total	
Club	Season	Division	Apps	Goals	Apps	Goals	Apps	Goals	Apps	Goals	Apps	Goals
Gimnàstic	2018–19	Segunda División	21	0	0	0	—		—		21	0
Spezia	2019–20	Serie B	29	0	0	0	—		4 (Note: Appearances in Serie B promotion play-offs)	0	33	0
Spezia	2020–21	Serie A	18	0	1	0	—		—		19	0
Spezia	2021–22	Serie A	27	0	2	0	—		—		29	0
Spezia	2022–23	Serie A	5	0	2	0	—		1 (Note: Appearance in Serie A relegation play-off)	0	8	0
Spezia	Total		79	0	5	0	0	0	5	0	89	0
Anorthosis (loan)	2023–24	Cypriot First Division	3	1	0	0	—		—		3	1
Career total			103	1	5	0	0	0	5	0	113	1
