= ED Láncara =

Spanish futsal club

Barcel Euro Puebla
- Full name: Escuelas Deportivas de Láncara
- Nickname(s): --
- Founded: 1995
- Dissolved: 2006
- Ground: Pazo Provincial, Lugo, Galicia, Spain
- Capacity: 6,000
- 2005–06: División de Honor, 12th
Home colours	Away colours

Escuelas Deportivas de Láncara was a futsal club based in A Pobra de San Xiao, belonging to Láncara municipality, Galicia, but that played his matches in Lugo.

The club was founded in 1995 and played its home games in Pazo Provincial with capacity of 6,000 seats.

The club was sponsored by Barcel Euro from 2004–05 until 2005–06.

== History ==
The club was founded in 1995. His greatest achievement was playing in División de Honor in the seasons 2004–05 and 2005–06. In 2006, the club had accumulated many debts of previous seasons. At beginning of 2006–07 season, the club sold its seat to Cometal Celta de Vigo.

== Season to season ==
Season	Division	Place	Copa de España
1996/97	1ª Nacional B	2nd	
1997/98	1ª Nacional B	1st	
1998/99	1ª Nacional A	4th	
1999/00	1ª Nacional A	4th	
2000/01	1ª Nacional A	2nd	

Season	Division	Place	Copa de España
2001/02	1ª Nacional A	—	
2002/03	D. Plata	7th	
2003/04	D. Plata	1st	
2004/05	D. Honor	13th	
2005/06	D. Honor	12th	

- 2 seasons in División de Honor
- 2 seasons in División de Plata
- 4 season in 1ª Nacional A
- 2 season in 1ª Nacional B

== Externan link ==
- Former Official Website
- History
