= Tiago Portuga =

Portuguese footballer

Personal information
- Full name: Tiago Venâncio Alves Pires
- Date of birth: 20 October 1991 (age 35)
- Place of birth: Braga, Portugal
- Height: 1.78 m (5 ft 10 in)
- Position: Left-back

Team information
- Current team: Cariñena

Youth career
- Grêmio Barueri

Senior career*
Years	Team	Apps	(Gls)
2011–2012	Grêmio Barueri	0	(0)
2011	→ São Bento (loan)		
2013	Santacruzense	3	(0)
2013	Rio Verde	3	(0)
2014–2015	Trofense	21	(0)
2015–2016	Oliveirense	23	(1)
2016–2017	Rayo Majadahonda	31	(5)
2017–2018	Cerceda	19	(3)
2018–2020	Ebro	37	(1)
2020–2021	El Ejido	7	(0)
2022–2023	Santa Coloma	36	(3)
2023–2024	Pas de la Casa	28	(1)
2025	Almudévar	16	(0)
2025–	Cariñena	9	(0)
- * Club domestic league appearances and goals as of 2 November 2025

Tiago Venâncio Alves Pires (born 20 October 1991), known as Tiago Portuga or simply Tiago, is a Portuguese professional footballer who plays as a left-back for Tercera Federación club Cariñena.

== Club career ==
=== Brazil ===
Born in Braga, Minho Province, Portuga started his senior career in Brazil after moving to that country at 8 months of age. He competed solely in the lower leagues or amateur football during his spell there, being part of Grêmio Barueri Futebol's Série B roster in 2012 but failing to appear in any matches.

=== Portugal ===
Portuga returned to his homeland midway through 2013–14, signing a short-term contract with Segunda Liga club C.D. Trofense. He made his professional debut on 16 February, starting and being replaced after 61 minutes of the 1–3 home loss against C.D. Aves. He played 18 games in his only full season, which ended in relegation.

For the 2015–16 campaign, Portuga joined third division side AD Oliveirense.

=== Spain ===
Portuga moved to Spain in the summer of 2016, representing in quick succession Segunda División B teams CF Rayo Majadahonda, CCD Cerceda, CD Ebro and CD El Ejido. On 30 October 2018, he was sent off midway through the first half of the Copa del Rey tie against Valencia CF at La Romareda, but the La Liga club could only win 2–1 eventually.
