= Javi Martínez (footballer, born 1997) =

Spanish footballer

Personal information
- Full name: Javier Martínez Tabernero
- Date of birth: 10 May 1997 (age 29)
- Place of birth: Pamplona, Spain
- Height: 1.85 m (6 ft 1 in)
- Position: Forward

Team information
- Current team: Almudévar

Youth career
- Peñas Oscenses
- 2012–2015: Osasuna

Senior career*
Years	Team	Apps	(Gls)
2014–2017	Osasuna B	77	(14)
2015	Osasuna	2	(0)
2017	Cerceda	8	(0)
2018	Izarra	20	(3)
2018–2020	Real Unión	28	(2)
2023–2024	University of Navarra		
2025–	Almudévar	8	(0)
- * Club domestic league appearances and goals as of 9 November 2025

Javier Martínez Tabernero (born 10 May 1997) is a Spanish footballer who plays as a forward for Tercera Federación club Almudévar.

== Club career ==
Born in Pamplona, Navarre, Martínez joined CA Osasuna's youth setup in 2012, after starting out at CD Peñas Oscenses. He made his debuts as a senior with the reserves in the 2014–15 campaign, in the Tercera División.

On 17 October 2015 Martínez made his professional debut, coming on as a late substitute for Nino in a 1–0 home win against Albacete Balompié in the Segunda División. He played one further match for the main squad before leaving the club, and subsequently resumed his career in the lower leagues, representing CD Izarra and Real Unión.
