= CD Vigo FS =

Spanish futsal club

Vigo FS
- Full name: Club Deportivo Vigo Futbol Sala
- Founded: 1991
- Dissolved: 2007
- Ground: Las Traviesas, Vigo, Galicia, Spain
- Capacity: 5,000
- 2007–08: Not competed
Home colours	Away colours

Club Deportivo Vigo Futbol Sala was a futsal club based in Vigo, Spain.

The club was founded in 1991 and its stadium is the ground As Travesas with capacity of 6,500 seats.

The club was sponsored by Cometal.

The club disappeared in 2007 due to not finding economic viability.

== History ==
The club was founded in 1991. For the season 2005–06, the club competed in Primera Nacional A, but at end of the season bought the seat of Barcel Euro Puebla (founded in 1995), who played in Láncara, (a parish of Lugo), moving the club to Vigo city. In December 2005, Celta de Vigo became an official sponsor. Celta de Vigo was not the owner, but merely a sponsor.

For the season 2006–07, the club competed with Cometal Celta de Vigo name.

- In June 2007, the club was relegated two divisions, from División de Honor to Primera Nacional A due to serious economic problems. Currently, as 2009, the status of club is dubious. Some news report that was dissolved in 2008.

== Season to season ==
Season	Division	Place	Copa de España
1991/92	1ª Nacional B	6th	
1992/93	1ª Nacional B	10th	
1993/94	1ª Nacional B	2nd	
1994/95	1ª Nacional A	6th	
1995/96	1ª Nacional A	3rd	
1996/97	D. Plata	11th	
1997/98	D. Plata	16th	
1998/99	1ª Nacional A	1st	
1999/00	D. Plata	8th	

Season	Division	Place	Copa de España
2000/01	D. Plata	3rd	
2001/02	D. Plata	10th	
2002/03	D. Plata	16th	
2003/04	1ª Nacional A	3rd	
2004/05	1ª Nacional A	—	
2005/06	1ª Nacional A	—	
2006/07	D. Honor	16th	
2007/08	1ª Nacional A	Disq.	

- 1 seasons in División de Honor
- 6 seasons in División de Plata
- 6 season in 1ª Nacional A
- 3 season in 1ª Nacional B

== Notable players ==
- (Brazil) Ari Santos
