= Sergio Montero =

Spanish footballer

Personal information
- Full name: Sergio Montero Ortiz
- Date of birth: 17 March 1997 (age 29)
- Place of birth: Ripollet, Spain
- Height: 1.78 m (5 ft 10 in)
- Position: Attacking midfielder

Team information
- Current team: Talavera de la Reina
- Number: 21

Youth career
- 2010–2016: Sabadell

Senior career*
Years	Team	Apps	(Gls)
2016–2018	Sabadell B	47	(5)
2018	Sabadell	1	(0)
2018–2020	Pobla Mafumet	50	(14)
2019–2020	Gimnàstic	7	(0)
2020–2021	Prat	26	(8)
2021–2022	Poli Ejido	32	(3)
2022	Sabadell	2	(0)
2023	Peña Deportiva	17	(4)
2023–2024	Lleida	32	(10)
2024–2025	Intercity	30	(5)
2025–	Talavera de la Reina	30	(4)
- * Club domestic league appearances and goals as of 10 June 2026

Sergio Montero Ortiz (born 17 March 1997) is a Spanish footballer who plays as an attacking midfielder for Primera Federación club Talavera de la Reina.

== Club career ==
Born in Ripollet, Barcelona, Catalonia, Montero joined CE Sabadell FC's youth setup at the age of 13. He made his senior debut with the reserves during the 2015–16 campaign in the Tercera División, and he renewed his contract for two further years on 21 July 2016.

Montero made his first-team debut on 13 May 2018, playing the last 28 minutes in a 0–0 Segunda División B home draw against Lleida Esportiu. On 6 July, he joined Gimnàstic de Tarragona and was assigned to the farm team in the fourth division.

Montero made his professional debut on 9 June 2019, starting in a 1–1 home draw against CD Lugo in the Segunda División, as his side was already relegated. A year later, he signed for third division side AE Prat.

On 20 June 2024, Montero signed with Intercity in the third tier.
