= Julio Camba =

Spanish footballer

Personal information
- Full name: Julio José Camba Chao
- Date of birth: 6 June 1996 (age 30)
- Place of birth: Vilalba, Spain
- Height: 1.81 m (5 ft 11 in)
- Position: Centre back

Team information
- Current team: Viveiro

Youth career
- Lugo

Senior career*
Years	Team	Apps	(Gls)
2014–2016	Lugo	1	(0)
2015–2016	→ Somozas (loan)	0	(0)
2016–2017	Polvorín	41	(1)
2017–2018	Viveiro	30	(4)
2018–2019	Racing Vilalbés	8	(0)
2019–	Viveiro	23	(0)
- * Club domestic league appearances and goals as of 1 March 2020

Julio José Camba Chao (born 5 June 1996) is a Spanish footballer who plays for Viveiro CF as a central defender.

== Club career ==
Born in Vilalba, Lugo, Camba was a youth product of CD Lugo. He made his official debut for the Galicians' first team on 9 November 2014, starting in a 2–1 home win against CE Sabadell FC in the Segunda División.

On 9 July 2015, Camba was loaned to Segunda División B club UD Somozas in a season-long move. After failing to make any appearances, he moved to Polvorín FC who acted as Lugo's farm team.

On 6 September 2017, Camba signed for Viveiro CF, still in the regional leagues.
