= CCD Cerceda =

Cerceda
- Full name: Centro Cultural e Deportivo Cerceda
- Founded: 1968
- Dissolved: 2018
- Ground: O Roxo, Cerceda, Galicia, Spain
- Capacity: 2,500
- President: José Antonio Silveira
- Head coach: Tito Ramallo
- 2017–18: 2ª B – Group 1, 20th of 20 (relegated)
Home colours	Away colours

Centro Cultural e Deportivo Cerceda was a Spanish football club based in Cerceda, in the autonomous community of Galicia. Founded in 1968, it last played in Segunda División B – Group 1, holding home games at Estadio O Roxo, which has a capacity of 2,500.

== History ==
Cerceda made their debut in Tercera División in 1994. After 23 consecutive years playing in this league and 12 failed attempts to promote to Segunda División B, the club would finally play in the third tier after achieving a place by paying €133,000.

On 30 June 2018, after being relegated to Tercera División, the club was dropped one more tier due to nonpayment. However, the club did not register for any competition in the 2018–19 season, effectively ceasing to exist.

== Season to season ==
Season	Tier	Division	Place	Copa del Rey
1968–69	6	2ª Reg.		
1969–70	6	2ª Reg.		
1970–71	6	2ª Reg.		
1971–72	6	2ª Reg.	7th	
1972–73	6	2ª Reg.	5th	
1973–74	6	2ª Reg.	7th	
1974–75	6	2ª Reg.	3rd	
1975–76	6	2ª Reg.	3rd	
1976–77	5	1ª Reg.	4th	
1977–78	6	1ª Reg.	4th	
1978–79	7	2ª Reg.	5th	
1979–80	7	2ª Reg.	8th	
1980–81	7	2ª Reg.	6th	
1981–82	7	2ª Reg.	5th	
1982–83	7	2ª Reg.	3rd	
1983–84	7	2ª Reg.	11th	
1984–85	7	2ª Reg.	11th	
1985–86	7	2ª Reg.	14th	
1986–87	7	2ª Reg.	11th	
1987–88	7	2ª Reg.	11th	

Season	Tier	Division	Place	Copa del Rey
1988–89	7	2ª Reg.	12th	
1989–90	7	2ª Reg.	1st	
1990–91	6	1ª Reg.	2nd	
1991–92	5	Reg. Pref.	15th	
1992–93	5	Reg. Pref.	5th	
1993–94	5	Reg. Pref.	1st	
1994–95	4	3ª	5th	
1995–96	4	3ª	1st	
1996–97	4	3ª	6th	
1997–98	4	3ª	12th	
1998–99	4	3ª	3rd	
1999–2000	4	3ª	8th	
2000–01	4	3ª	17th	
2001–02	4	3ª	10th	
2002–03	4	3ª	1st	
2003–04	4	3ª	1st	First round
2004–05	4	3ª	6th	Round of 64
2005–06	4	3ª	6th	
2006–07	4	3ª	6th	
2007–08	4	3ª	5th	

Season	Tier	Division	Place	Copa del Rey
2008–09	4	3ª	4th	
2009–10	4	3ª	2nd	
2010–11	4	3ª	1st	Second round
2011–12	4	3ª	3rd	Second round
2012–13	4	3ª	11th	
2013–14	4	3ª	2nd	
2014–15	4	3ª	3rd	
2015–16	4	3ª	2nd	
2016–17	4	3ª	3rd	
2017–18	3	2ª B	20th	

- 1 season in Segunda División B
- 23 seasons in Tercera División

== Current squad ==
As of 7 November 2017

Note: Flags indicate national team as defined under FIFA eligibility rules; some limited exceptions apply. Players may hold more than one non-FIFA nationality.

No.	Pos.	Nation	Player
—	GK	ESP	Gorka Magunazelaia
—	GK	ESP	Ángel Fraga
—	DF	POR	Tiago Portuga
—	DF	ESP	Oriol Dot
—	DF	ESP	Juanmi
—	DF	ESP	Axel Serio
—	DF	ESP	David Soto
—	DF	ESP	Uxío Marcos
—	MF	ESP	Pablo Agulló
—	MF	ESP	Armando Corbalán

No.	Pos.	Nation	Player
—	MF	ESP	Carlos López
—	MF	ESP	Álvaro Martín
—	MF	ESP	Kike
—	MF	ESP	Dani Ponce
—	MF	ESP	Hugo Rama
—	MF	PER	Claudio Torrejón
—	MF	ESP	Keko Vilariño
—	FW	ESP	Javi Martínez
—	FW	ESP	Dani Pedrosa

== Honours ==
- Tercera División: 1995–96, 2002–03, 2003–04, 2010–11

== Notable former players ==
- (Equatorial Guinea) Gorka Luariz
- (Spain) Manel
