= Ezcároz – Ezkaroze =

Town in Navarre, Spain

Coordinates: 42°53′19″N 1°05′47″W

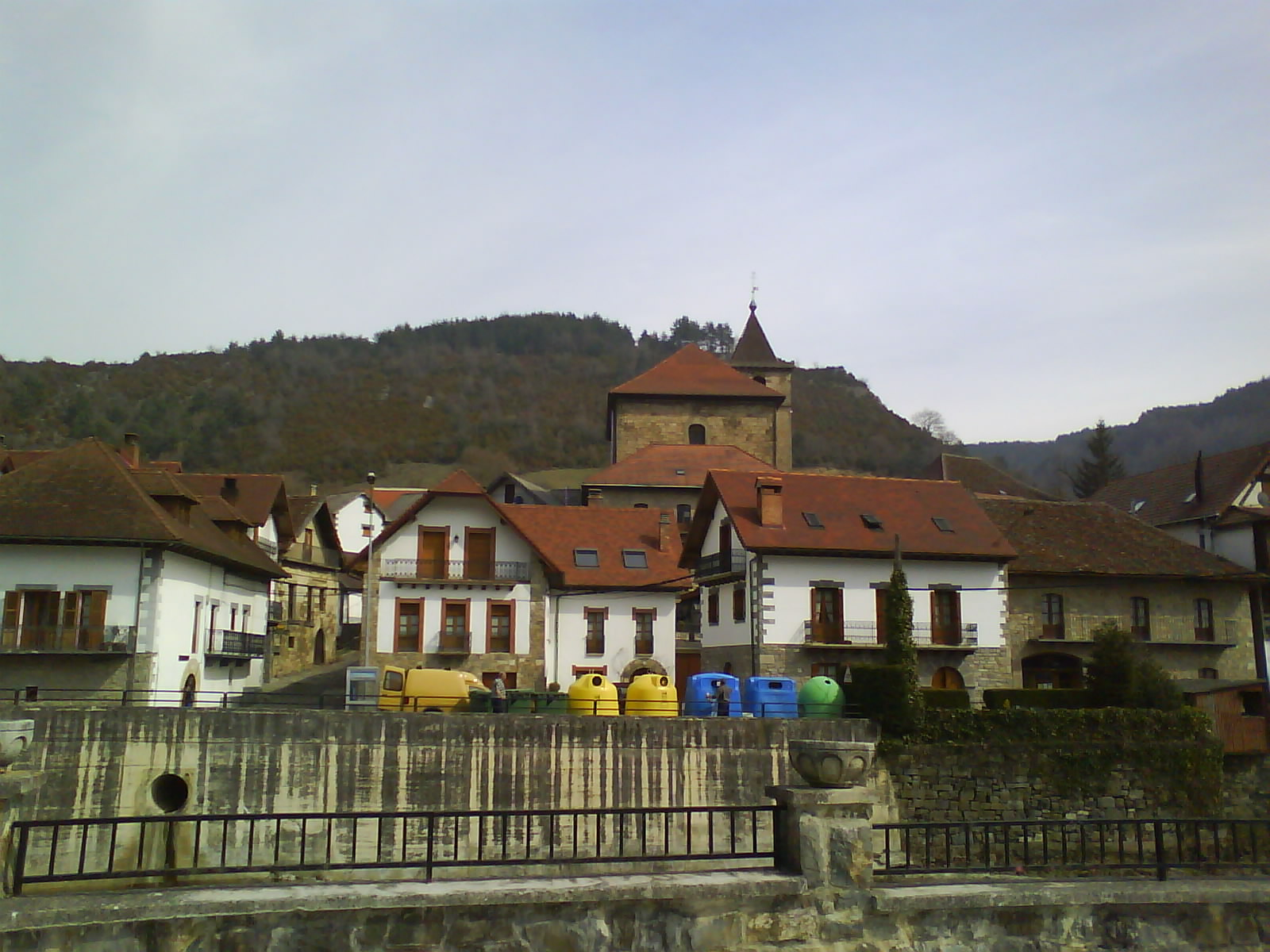
Ezkaroze town

Ezcároz – Ezkaroze (or Escároz) is a town and municipality located in the province and autonomous community of Navarre, northern Spain.
