= Pol Prats =

Spanish footballer

Personal information
- Full name: Pol Prats Moragrega
- Date of birth: 25 May 1999 (age 27)
- Place of birth: Paüls, Spain
- Height: 1.70 m (5 ft 7 in)
- Position: Winger

Team information
- Current team: Rayo Majadahonda
- Number: 11

Youth career
- Ebre
- Tortosa
- 2014–2015: Rapitenca
- 2015–2016: Reus
- 2016–2018: Gimnàstic

Senior career*
Years	Team	Apps	(Gls)
2015	Rapitenca	?	(1)
2017–2019	Pobla Mafumet	39	(4)
2019–2022	Gimnàstic	16	(1)
2021	→ Olot (loan)	14	(2)
2022	Huesca B	13	(0)
2022	Huesca	2	(0)
2022–2024	Tudelano	43	(6)
2024	Antequera	10	(0)
2024–2025	Tudelano	31	(3)
2025–	Rayo Majadahonda	32	(2)
- * Club domestic league appearances and goals as of 16 May 2026

Pol Prats Moragrega (born 25 May 1999) is a Spanish footballer who plays as a winger for Segunda Federación club Rayo Majadahonda.

== Club career ==
Born in Paüls, Tarragona, Catalonia, Prats began his career at Escola Ebre Esportiva, and subsequently represented CD Tortosa before joining UE Rapitenca in 2014. At the latter club, he made his senior debut at the age of just 15 in the Primera Catalana, scoring once in a 6–0 home routing of CF Juventud 25 de Septiembre on 1 February 2015.

In July 2016, Prats joined Gimnàstic de Tarragona's Juvenil squad after a one-year stint at CF Reus Deportiu. He made his debut for the farm team on 19 August 2017, starting in a 1–1 draw at FC Ascó in the Tercera División.

Prats scored his first goal for Pobla on 22 October 2017, netting the game's only in an away success over CE Europa, and featured regularly during the campaign. He made his first-team debut on 19 May 2019, coming on as a first-half substitute for Mohammed Djetei and scoring his team's second in a 3–4 Segunda División away loss against Córdoba CF, as both sides were already relegated.

On 6 August 2019, Prats renewed his contract with Nàstic until 2022. On 1 February 2021, he was loaned to fellow Segunda División B side UE Olot for the remainder of the campaign.
