= Josete (footballer, born 1988) =

Spanish footballer

Personal information
- Full name: José Antonio Malagón Rubio
- Date of birth: 28 May 1988 (age 38)
- Place of birth: Elche, Spain
- Height: 1.79 m (5 ft 10 in)
- Position: Defender

Team information
- Current team: Xerez
- Number: 12

Youth career
- 1999–2007: Elche

Senior career*
Years	Team	Apps	(Gls)
2007–2010	Elche B	87	(9)
2010	Elche	1	(0)
2010–2011	Alavés	15	(2)
2011–2013	Zamora	47	(8)
2013–2016	Cádiz	110	(9)
2016	Oviedo	8	(1)
2016–2017	Elche	16	(0)
2017–2020	Lugo	63	(2)
2020–2022	UCAM Murcia	51	(3)
2022–2023	Talavera	11	(0)
2023	Badajoz	7	(0)
2024	AC Torrellano	12	(1)
2024–	Xerez	7	(0)
- * Club domestic league appearances and goals as of 13 October 2024

José Antonio Malagón Rubio (born 28 May 1988), known as Josete, is a Spanish footballer who plays as a defender for Xerez.

== Club career ==
Born in Elche, Province of Alicante, Josete graduated from Elche CF's youth system, making his senior debut with the reserves in the 2007–08 season, in the Tercera División. On 19 June 2010, he appeared in his first professional game with the Valencians' first team, featuring the last eight minutes in a 4–1 Segunda División home win over Real Sociedad.

Josete competed in the Segunda División B the following years, representing Deportivo Alavés, Zamora CF and Cádiz CF. On 22 January 2016, he returned to the second division after agreeing to an 18-month contract with Real Oviedo. He scored his first goal in the latter league on 1 May, the only as the hosts defeated Córdoba CF.

On 12 July 2016, Josete rejoined Elche. The following 29 June, after suffering relegation, he signed a two-year deal with fellow division two club CD Lugo.

Josete returned to the third tier in summer 2020, with the 32-year-old agreeing to a contract at UCAM Murcia CF.

In October 2022, Josete joined fellow third tier side CF Talavera de la Reina. He departed the club in January 2023, joining CD Badajoz.

In March 2024, Josete joined AC Torrellano on a contract until the end of the season.
