= Roger Figueras =

Spanish footballer

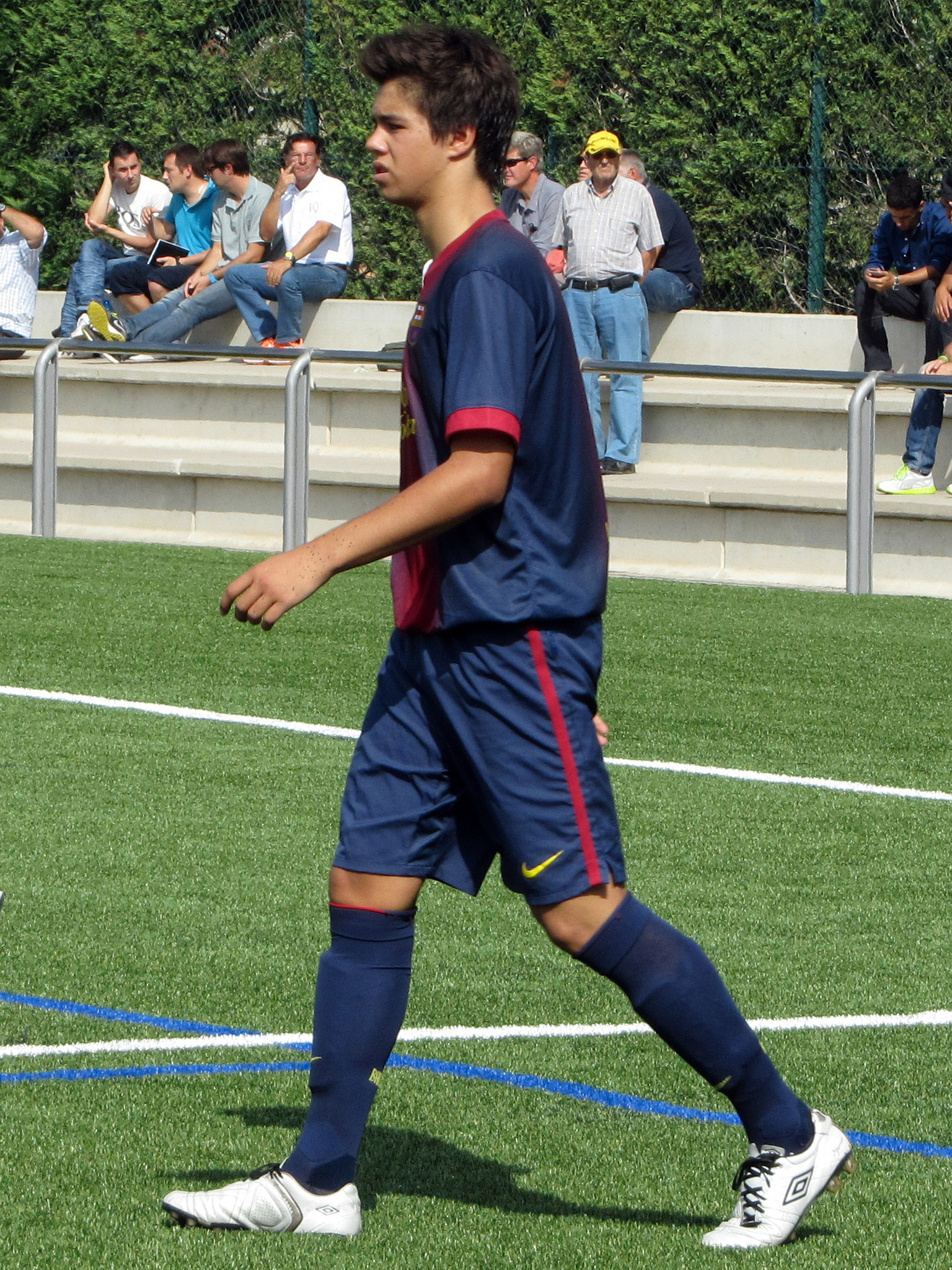
- Roger Figueras

Personal information
- Full name: Roger Figueras Ballart
- Date of birth: 5 April 1997 (age 29)
- Place of birth: Valls, Spain
- Height: 1.80 m (5 ft 11 in)
- Position: Centre-back

Team information
- Current team: Paganese
- Number: 3

Youth career
- 2012–2015: Barcelona
- 2014–2015: → Gimnàstic (loan)
- 2015–2016: Gimnàstic

Senior career*
| Years | Team | Apps | (Gls) |
| 2016–2020 | Pobla Mafumet | 104 | (0) |
| 2018–2019 | Gimnàstic | 3 | (0) |
| 2020–2021 | Prat | 22 | (0) |
| 2021–2024 | Lleida | 85 | (0) |
| 2024–2025 | Tudelano | 26 | (3) |
| 2025– | Paganese | 2 | (0) |
- * Club domestic league appearances and goals as of 28 September 2025

Roger Figueras Ballart (born 5 April 1997) is a Spanish professional footballer who plays as a centre-back for Italian Serie D club Paganese.

== Club career ==
Born in Valls, Tarragona, Catalonia, Figueras represented FC Barcelona and Gimnàstic de Tarragona as a youth. On 20 August 2016 he made his senior debut with the reserves, starting in a 1–1 Tercera División home draw against EC Granollers.

On 7 August 2017, Figueras renewed his contract until 2020. He made his professional debut on 30 September of the following year, starting in a 1–3 home loss against Deportivo de La Coruña in the Segunda División.

On 23 July 2020, Figueras signed for AE Prat of the Segunda División B.
