= Manu (footballer, born 1984) =

Spanish footballer (born 1984)

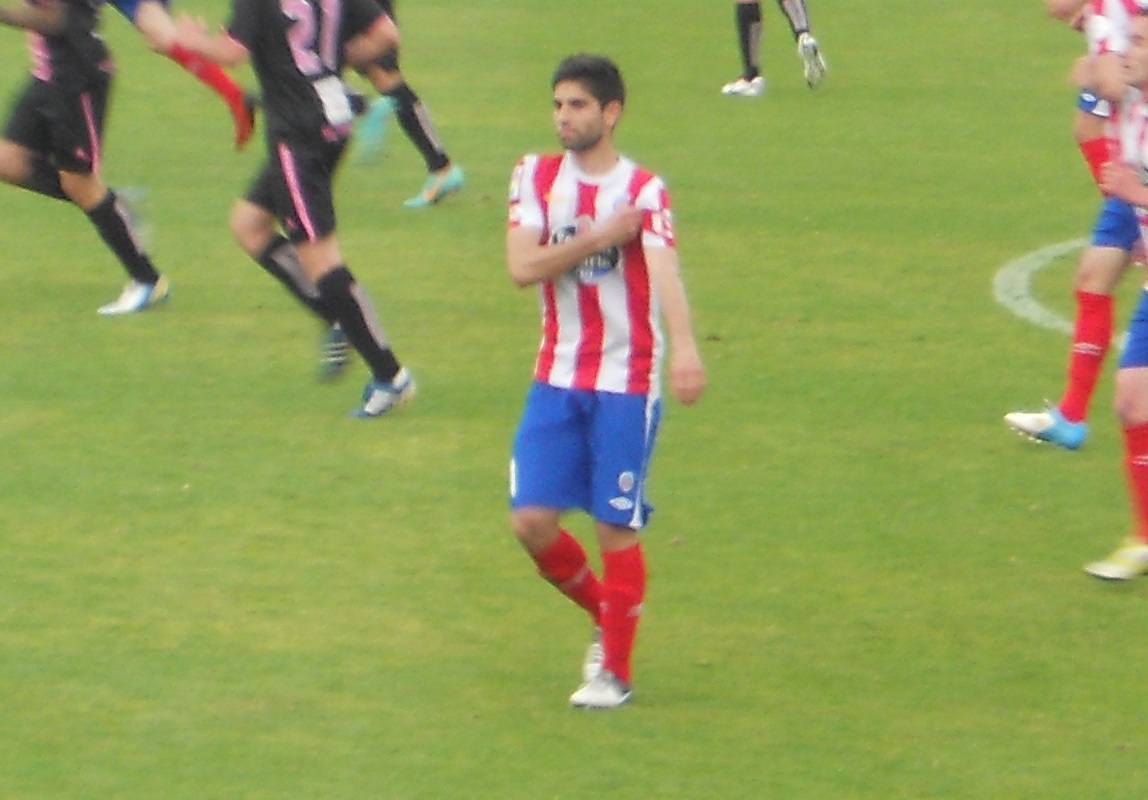

Personal information
- Full name: José Manuel Rodríguez Morgade
- Date of birth: 22 June 1984 (age 42)
- Place of birth: Wädenswil, Switzerland
- Height: 1.76 m (5 ft 9 in)
- Position: Left-back

Youth career
- CD Ourense

Senior career*
Years	Team	Apps	(Gls)
2003–2007	CD Ourense	57	(6)
2007–2017	Lugo	344	(19)
2017–2018	Cultural Leonesa	2	(0)
2018–2019	Elche	22	(0)
2019–2022	Coruxo	67	(1)
2022–2024	Ourense CF	48	(0)
- * Club domestic league appearances and goals

José Manuel Rodríguez Morgade (born 22 June 1984), commonly known as Manu, is a Spanish former professional footballer who played mainly as a left-back.

== Club career ==
Born in Wädenswil, Switzerland to Spanish immigrants, Manu started playing with CD Ourense in the Segunda División B. He remained in that level the following eight seasons, signing in summer 2007 with Galician neighbours CD Lugo.

In the 2011–12 campaign, Manu contributed 43 matches (all starts) and five goals as the club promoted to Segunda División for the second time in its history, the first in 20 years. He made his debut in the competition on 18 August 2012 in a 1–0 home win against Hércules CF, scoring the game's only goal through a penalty kick; he served as team captain for several seasons.

On 4 July 2017, after one decade with Lugo, free agent Manu joined fellow second-tier side Cultural y Deportiva Leonesa. The following 25 January, he signed for Elche CF of the third division after severing ties with the former.

Manu continued competing in the lower leagues until his retirement, with Coruxo FC and Ourense CF.

== Career statistics ==
As of match played 7 February 2021

Appearances and goals by club, season and competition
Club	Season	League			National Cup		Other		Total	
Club	Season	Division	Apps	Goals	Apps	Goals	Apps	Goals	Apps	Goals
Ourense	2003–04	Segunda División B	13	0	0	0	2 (Note: Appearance(s) in Promotion Playoffs)	0	15	0
Ourense	2004–05	Segunda División B	5	0	0	0	—		5	0
Ourense	2005–06	Segunda División B	6	1	1	0	—		7	1
Ourense	2006–07	Segunda División B	33	5	0	0	—		33	5
Ourense	Total		57	6	1	0	2	0	60	6
Lugo	2007–08	Segunda División B	35	2	0	0	—		35	2
Lugo	2008–09	Segunda División B	35	0	1	0	—		36	0
Lugo	2009–10	Segunda División B	20	0	0	0	—		20	0
Lugo	2010–11	Segunda División B	37	5	0	0	6	0	43	5
Lugo	2011–12	Segunda División B	37	5	1	0	6	0	44	5
Lugo	2012–13	Segunda División	42	3	1	0	—		43	3
Lugo	2013–14	Segunda División	41	2	2	0	—		43	2
Lugo	2014–15	Segunda División	36	2	0	0	—		36	2
Lugo	2015–16	Segunda División	38	0	1	0	—		39	0
Lugo	2016–17	Segunda División	23	0	0	0	—		23	0
Lugo	Total		344	19	6	0	12	0	362	19
Cultural Leonesa	2017–18	Segunda División	2	0	2	0	—		4	0
Elche	2017–18	Segunda División B	12	0	—		6	0	18	0
Elche	2018–19	Segunda División	10	0	1	0	—		11	0
Elche	Total		24	0	3	0	6	0	33	0
Coruxo	2019–20	Segunda División B	23	0	1	0	—		24	0
Coruxo	2020–21	Segunda División B	12	0	1	0	—		13	0
Coruxo	Total		35	0	2	0	0	0	37	0
Career total			462	25	14	0	20	0	496	25
