= Bernat Guiu =

Spanish footballer

Personal information
- Full name: Bernat Guiu Vilanova
- Date of birth: 20 September 2000 (age 26)
- Place of birth: Falset, Spain
- Position: Forward

Team information
- Current team: Virtus Entella
- Number: 11

Youth career
- Gimnàstic

Senior career*
Years	Team	Apps	(Gls)
2019–2021	Pobla Mafumet	65	(3)
2020–2021	Gimnàstic	6	(0)
2021–2024	Pergolettese	93	(11)
2024–	Virtus Entella	62	(9)
- * Club domestic league appearances and goals as of 13 May 2026

Bernat Guiu Vilanova (born 20 September 2000) is a Spanish professional footballer who plays as a forward for Serie B club Virtus Entella.

== Club career ==
Born in Falset, Guiu started his career in Gimnàstic de Tarragona youth system, and farm team Pobla de Mafumet, on Tercera División. He made his debut for Tarragona and Segunda División B on 2 February 2020 against Ebro. On 4 July 2021, he left the club.

On 29 July 2021, he joined Serie C club Pergolettese.

On 22 July 2024, Guiu moved to Virtus Entella, also in Serie C.
