= Dani Pedrosa (footballer) =

Spanish footballer

Personal information
- Full name: Daniel Pedrosa Loureiro
- Date of birth: 4 September 1996 (age 30)
- Place of birth: Ribadeo, Spain
- Height: 1.81 m (5 ft 11 1/2 in)
- Position: Forward

Team information
- Current team: Estradense

Youth career
- Ribadeo
- 2009–2015: Lugo

Senior career*
| Years | Team | Apps | (Gls) |
| 2013–2018 | Lugo | 1 | (0) |
| 2016–2017 | → Somozas (loan) | 38 | (1) |
| 2017–2018 | → Cerceda (loan) | 33 | (6) |
| 2018–2019 | Valladolid B | 34 | (1) |
| 2019–2020 | Ourense | 15 | (2) |
| 2020–2022 | Racing Vilalbés | 54 | (19) |
| 2022–2024 | Bergantiños | 58 | (6) |
| 2024–2025 | Boiro | 27 | (14) |
| 2025– | Estradense | 6 | (3) |
- * Club domestic league appearances and goals as of 11 October 2025

Daniel 'Dani' Pedrosa Loureiro (born 4 September 1996) is a Spanish footballer who plays for Tercera Federación club Estradense as a forward.

== Club career ==
Born in Ribadeo, Lugo, Pedrosa was a youth product of CD Lugo. He was an instrumental part of the side while playing with the Juvenil squad.

Pedrosa made his official debut for the Galicians' main squad on 16 October 2013, replacing fellow youth graduate Keko Vilariño in a 0–1 away loss against Recreativo de Huelva for the season's Copa del Rey. He made his Segunda División debut on 31 May 2015, starting in a 1–1 home draw against Albacete Balompié.

On 27 January 2016, Pedrosa and his Lugo teammate Keko Vilariño were loaned to UD Somozas in Segunda División B, until June. On 30 August, their loan was renewed for a year.

On 5 July 2018, after a one-year loan stint at CCD Cerceda, Pedrosa joined fellow third division side Real Valladolid B after his contract with Lugo expired.
