= Keko (footballer, born 1996) =

Spanish footballer

Personal information
- Full name: Alberto Vilariño Sobrado
- Date of birth: 20 April 1996 (age 30)
- Place of birth: A Pobra de San Xiao, Spain
- Height: 1.78 m (5 ft 10 in)
- Position: Midfielder

Youth career
- Lugo
- 2014–2015: Levante

Senior career*
Years	Team	Apps	(Gls)
2013	Lugo	0	(0)
2015	Levante B	0	(0)
2015–2018	Lugo	0	(0)
2016–2017	→ Somozas (loan)	31	(1)
2017–2018	→ Cerceda (loan)	24	(0)
2019	Somozas	4	(0)
2019–2025	Sarriana	152	(11)

International career
2014	Spain U18	2	(0)
- * Club domestic league appearances and goals as of 11 May 2025

Alberto Vilariño Sobrado (born 20 April 1996), commonly known as Keko, is a Spanish footballer who plays as a midfielder.

== Club career ==
Born in A Pobra de San Xiao, Láncara, Lugo, Keko was a youth product of CD Lugo. He made his official debut for the Galicians' main squad on 16 October 2013, while still a junior, starting in a 0–1 away loss against Recreativo de Huelva for the season's Copa del Rey.

On 18 July 2014 Keko moved to Levante UD, being initially assigned to the Juvenil squad. On 1 September of the following year he rescinded his contract, and returned to Lugo seven days later.

On 27 January 2016, Keko and his Lugo teammate Dani Pedrosa were loaned to UD Somozas in Segunda División B, until June. On 30 August, their loan was renewed for a year.

On 10 August 2018, Keko terminated his contract with Lugo.

From 2019, he played 6 seasons for Sarriana, a team from Sarria, a neighbor town to his native A Pobra de San Xiao, earning two promotions from the sixth tier to 4th (Segunda Federación).
