= Serge Leuko =

Cameroonian footballer (born 1993)

Personal information
- Full name: Serge Sidoine Tchaha Leuko
- Date of birth: 4 August 1993 (age 33)
- Place of birth: Douala, Cameroon
- Height: 1.76 m (5 ft 9 in)
- Position: Full back

Team information
- Current team: Minerva

Youth career
- 2008–2009: Mallorca
- 2009–2010: Ciutadella
- 2010–2011: Torre Levante
- 2011–2012: Valencia

Senior career*
Years	Team	Apps	(Gls)
2012–2015	Valencia B	70	(1)
2015–2020	Lugo	58	(0)
2015–2016	→ Somozas (loan)	28	(1)
2020–2021	Waasland-Beveren	14	(0)
2021–2022	Linense	13	(0)
2022–2025	Nea Salamina	64	(2)
2026–	Minerva	0	(0)

International career^{‡}
2011	Cameroon U20	3	(0)
2017–	Cameroon	6	(0)
- * Club domestic league appearances and goals as of 15:48, 8 March 2026 (UTC) ‡ National team caps and goals as of 7 October 2017

Serge Sidoine Tchaha Leuko (born 4 August 1993) is a Cameroonian professional footballer who plays as a right/left-back for Spanish club Minerva.

== Club career ==
Born in Douala, Leuko joined RCD Mallorca's youth setup in 2008, through the Samuel Eto'o Foundation. After representing Atlètic de Ciutadella and CF Torre Levante, he moved to Valencia in 2011.

Leuko made his senior debut for the latter's reserves in the 2012–13 campaign, in Segunda División B. On 17 July 2015 he signed a three-year contract with CD Lugo in Segunda División, but was loaned to third-tier club UD Somozas on 10 August, for one year.

Leuko made his professional debut on 21 August 2016, coming on as a late substitute for Igor Martínez in a 2–2 away draw against Gimnàstic de Tarragona. Initially a backup to Jordi Calavera as a right back, he overtook veteran Manu on the left side in December, becoming a first choice afterwards.

On 17 September 2020, Leuko agreed to a one-year deal with Belgian First Division A side Waasland-Beveren.

== International career ==
After playing for Cameroon at under-20 level, Leuko was first called by the full side on 12 March 2017 for two friendlies against Tunisia and Guinea. He made his full international debut sixteen days later, starting in 1–2 to the latter.
