= Antonio Campillo =

Spanish footballer

Personal information
- Full name: Antonio Campillo Medina
- Date of birth: 16 December 1990 (age 35)
- Place of birth: Madrid, Spain
- Height: 1.76 m (5 ft 9 in)
- Position: Attacking midfielder

Youth career
- Las Rozas
- Atlético Madrid

Senior career*
Years	Team	Apps	(Gls)
2008–2009	Atlético Madrid C	33	(7)
2009–2010	Atlético Madrid B	17	(0)
2010–2012	Getafe B	12	(0)
2012	Melilla	10	(2)
2012–2013	Collado Villalba	33	(9)
2013–2015	Rayo Vallecano B	58	(18)
2015–2020	Lugo	128	(6)
Total		291	(42)
- * Club domestic league appearances and goals

Antonio Campillo Medina (born 16 December 1990) is a Spanish retired footballer who played as an attacking midfielder.

== Club career ==
Born in Madrid, Campillo graduated with Atlético Madrid's youth setup, and made his debuts as a senior with the C-team in 2008, in Tercera División. In the 2009 summer he was promoted to the reserves in Segunda División B.

In July 2010 Campillo moved to another reserve team, Getafe CF B also in the third level. On 25 January 2012 he signed for fellow league team UD Melilla, after being rarely used by Geta.

In July 2012 Campillo joined neighbouring CU Collado Villalba, in the fourth division. After scoring nine goals for the side he agreed to a two-year deal with Rayo Vallecano, being assigned to the B-side in the third tier.

On 3 July 2015 Campillo signed a two-year deal with CD Lugo in Segunda División, after scoring a career-best 13 goals with Rayo B. He made his debut as a professional on 23 August, starting in a 2–2 away draw against Real Oviedo.

Campillo scored his first professional goal on 27 August 2016, netting the equalizer in a 3–3 home draw against Real Zaragoza. He subsequently became a regular for the side, but spent the entire 2019–20 season nursing several knee injuries.

On 19 August 2020, aged just 29, Campillo announced his retirement from professional football.
