= 2021–22 CD Lugo season =

CD Lugo
2021–22 season
- President: Tino Saqués
- Head coach: Rubén Albés
- Stadium: Estadio Anxo Carro
- Segunda División: 16th
- Copa del Rey: Second round
Home colours	Away colours

The 2021–22 season was the 69th season in the existence of CD Lugo and the club's 10th consecutive season in the second division of Spanish football. In addition to the domestic league, Lugo participated in this season's edition of the Copa del Rey.

== Players ==
=== First-team squad ===
As of 22 March 2022

Note: Flags indicate national team as defined under FIFA eligibility rules; some limited exceptions apply. Players may hold more than one non-FIFA nationality.

No.	Pos.	Nation	Player
2	DF	ESP	Álex Pérez
3	DF	ESP	Diego Alende (on loan from Valladolid)
4	MF	ESP	Juan Antonio Ros
5	MF	ESP	Carlos Pita (captain)
6	MF	ESP	Juanpe Jiménez
7	FW	ESP	David Mayoral (on loan from Cádiz)
8	MF	ESP	Fernando Seoane (2nd captain)
9	FW	ESP	Manu Barreiro
11	FW	PHI	José Ángel Carrillo
12	DF	ESP	Pol García
13	GK	ESP	Óscar Whalley
14	MF	ESP	Xavi Torres
15	DF	ESP	Roberto Canella
16	FW	ESP	Chris Ramos

No.	Pos.	Nation	Player
17	MF	ESP	Sebas Moyano
18	MF	ESP	Josep Señé
19	DF	UKR	Orest Lebedenko
20	MF	ESP	Pablo Clavería
21	DF	ESP	Alberto Rodríguez
22	DF	ESP	Edu Campabadal (4th captain)
23	FW	ESP	Joselu (on loan from Tenerife)
24	MF	ESP	Iriome (3rd captain)
29	FW	BOL	Jaume Cuéllar
30	DF	ESP	Ricard Sánchez (on loan from Granada)
31	DF	GHA	Najeeb Yakubu (on loan from Vorskla Poltava)
34	GK	ESP	Fran Vieites
—	FW	UKR	Vladyslav Ostrovskyi

=== Reserve team ===
Note: Flags indicate national team as defined under FIFA eligibility rules; some limited exceptions apply. Players may hold more than one non-FIFA nationality.

No.	Pos.	Nation	Player
26	GK	ESP	Julen Fernández
27	MF	ESP	Dani Vidal
30	DF	ESP	Jesús Fernández
31	DF	ESP	Luis Castro
33	DF	ESP	Carlos Torrado

No.	Pos.	Nation	Player
35	FW	PUR	Leandro Antonetti
37	DF	ESP	Andrés Castrín
38	MF	ESP	Alejandro Fidalgo
41	FW	ESP	David Rojo
—	MF	MTN	Idrissa Thiam

=== Out on loan ===
Note: Flags indicate national team as defined under FIFA eligibility rules; some limited exceptions apply. Players may hold more than one non-FIFA nationality.

No.	Pos.	Nation	Player
—	DF	ARG	Matías Vesprini (at Compostela until 30 June 2022)
—	FW	ESP	Christian Martínez (at La Nucía until 30 June 2022)

No.	Pos.	Nation	Player
—	FW	MLI	Sidi (at Lemos until 30 June 2022)

== Pre-season and friendlies ==
Win Draw Loss Fixtures

17 July 2021 Friendly	Burgos	0–0	Lugo	Astorga, Spain
19:00 CEST (UTC+2)				Stadium: Estadio La Eragudina

28 July 2021 Friendly	Compostela	0–3	Lugo	Santiago de Compostela, Spain
19:00 CEST (UTC+2)				Stadium: Estadio Verónica Boquete de San Lázaro

31 July 2021 Friendly	Lugo	1–1 (5–4 p)	Oviedo	Ribadeo, Spain
17:30 CEST (UTC+2)				Stadium: Estadio Municipal Pepe Barrera

== Competitions ==
=== Overall record ===
Competition	First match	Last match	Starting round	Final position	Record							
Competition	First match	Last match	Starting round	Final position	Pld	W	D	L	GF	GA	GD	Win %
Segunda División	15 August 2021	28 May 2022	Matchday 1	16th	42	10	20	12	46	52	−6	23.81
Copa del Rey	2 December 2021	16 December 2021	First round	Second round	2	0	1	1	3	4	−1	0.00
Total					44	10	21	13	49	56	−7	22.73

Source: Soccerway

=== Segunda División ===
==== League table ====
Pos	Team	Pld	W	D	L	GF	GA	GD	Pts
14	Mirandés	42	15	7	20	58	62	−4	52 (Note: Mirandés finished ahead of Ibiza on head-to-head points: Mirandés 4–0 Ibiza, Ibiza 0–2 Mirandés.)
15	Ibiza	42	12	16	14	53	59	−6	52
16	Lugo	42	10	20	12	46	52	−6	50
17	Sporting Gijón	42	11	13	18	43	48	−5	46
18	Málaga	42	11	12	19	36	57	−21	45

Source: LaLiga SmartBank
Rules for classification: 1) points; 2) head-to-head points; 3) head-to-head goal difference; 4) goal difference; 5) number of goals scored

==== Results summary ====
Overall								Home						Away					
Pld	W	D	L	GF	GA	GD	Pts	W	D	L	GF	GA	GD	W	D	L	GF	GA	GD
42	10	20	12	46	52	−6	50	9	8	4	22	19	+3	1	12	8	24	33	−9

Source: La Liga SmartBank

==== Results by round ====
Round	1	2	3	4	5	6	7	8	9	10	11	12	13	14	15	16	17	18	19	20	21	22	23	24	25	26	27	28	29	30	31	32	33	34	35	36	37	38	39	40	41	42
Ground	A	H	H	A	H	A	H	A	H	A	H	A	H	A	H	A	H	A	H	A	H	A	H	A	H	A	H	A	A	H	A	H	A	A	H	A	H	H	A	H	A	H
Result	D	D	L	D	W	L	D	D	W	D	W	L	D	L	L	W	D	D	D	D	W	D	W	D	W	D	D	L	D	W	D	D	L	L	W	L	D	L	D	L	L	W
Position	8	12	18	20	14	18	17	18	14	14	11	13	13	15	16	15	15	17	16	16	17	18	13	13	11	12	12	13	13	12	12	11	14	16	15	15	14	15	15	16	16	16

Source: La Liga SmartBank
A = Away; H = Home; W = Win; D = Draw; L = Loss

==== Matches ====
The league fixtures were announced on 30 June 2021.

15 August 2021 1	Oviedo	2–2	Lugo	Oviedo
19:30 CEST (UTC+2)	Viti 30'; Obeng 33'	Report	Carrillo 78'; Joselu 89' (pen.)	Stadium: Carlos Tartiere; Attendance: 5,769; Referee: Alejandro Quintero González

21 August 2021 2	Lugo	0–0	Real Sociedad B	Lugo
17:00 CEST (UTC+2)		Report		Stadium: Estadio Anxo Carro; Attendance: 1,657; Referee: Raúl Martín González Francés

29 August 2021 3	Lugo	0–2	Valladolid	Lugo
19:30 CEST (UTC+2)		Report	Weissman 11', (red card) 38'; Toni 53'	Stadium: Estadio Anxo Carro; Referee: Gorka Sagués Oscoz

4 September 2021 4	Fuenlabrada	1–1	Lugo	Fuenlabrada
21:00 CEST (UTC+2)	León 39'	Report	Señé 27'	Stadium: Fernando Torres; Referee: Óliver de la Fuente Ramos

13 September 2021 5	Lugo	3–2	Huesca	Lugo
21:00 CEST (UTC+2)	Valentín 6'; Barreiro 83'; Cuéllar 86'	Report	Barreiro 35' (o.g.); Escriche 39'	Stadium: Estadio Anxo Carro; Referee: Saúl Ais Reig

18 September 2021 6	Cartagena	2–1	Lugo	Cartagena
21:00 CEST (UTC+2)				Stadium: Estadio Cartagonova

26 September 2021 7	Lugo	1–1	Zaragoza	Lugo
20:30 CEST (UTC+2)	Chris Ramos 28'; Xavi Torres (yellow card) 69'	Report	Borja Sainz 32' (pen.); Nano (yellow card) 63'	Stadium: Anxo Carro; Attendance: 2,135; Referee: Víctor García

30 October 2021 13	Lugo	1–1	Sporting Gijón	Lugo
18:15 CEST (UTC+2)				Stadium: Estadio Anxo Carro

19 January 2022 21	Lugo	2–1	Almería	Lugo
21:00 CET	Manu Barreiro 4'; Chris Ramos 23'; Juan Antonio Ros (yellow card) 40'; José Ángel Carrillo (yellow card) 90'; Ricard Sánchez (yellow card) 90+5'; Juanpe (red card) 90+5'	Report	Juanjo Nieto (yellow card) 40'; Babić (yellow card) 86'; Carlos Pita 88' (o.g.); Ramazani (yellow card) 90+5'; Curro Sánchez (yellow card) 90+7'	Stadium: Estadio Anxo Carro; Referee: Gorka Sagues Oscoz

2 January 2022 22	Sporting Gijón	1–1	Lugo	Gijón
CEST (UTC+2)				Stadium: El Molinón

5 February 2022 26	Real Sociedad B	1–1	Lugo	San Sebastián
16:00 CET (UTC+2)	Clemente (yellow card) 28'; Olasagati (yellow card) 55'; Karrikaburu 72'		Barreiro 31' (pen.); Sánchez (yellow card) 42'; Ramos (yellow card) 85'	Stadium: Anoeta; Attendance: 5,356; Referee: Daniel Trujillo

12 March 2022 31	Almería	3–3	Lugo	Almería
18:15 CET	Sadiq 13' 49'; Clavería 72' (o.g.)	Report	Ricard Sánchez 37'; Clavería 67' (yellow card) 90+5'; José Ángel Carrillo 79'	Stadium: Estadio de los Juegos Mediterráneos; Attendance: 10,053; Referee: (Spain) Juan Pulido Santana
