= 2019–20 CD Lugo season =

CD Lugo
2019–20 season
- President: Tino Saqués
- Head coach: Juanfran
- Stadium: Estadio Anxo Carro
- Segunda División: 16th
- Copa del Rey: First round
- Top goalscorer: League: Cristian Herrera (12); All: Cristian Herrera (13)
Home colours	Away colours	Third colours

The 2019–20 season was Club Deportivo Lugo's 67th season in existence and the club's 8th consecutive season in the second division of Spanish football. In addition to the domestic league, CD Lugo participated in this season's edition of the Copa del Rey. The season was slated to cover a period from 1 July 2019 to 30 June 2020. It was extended extraordinarily beyond 30 June due to the COVID-19 pandemic in Spain.

== Players ==
=== Current squad ===
As of 1 February 2020

Note: Flags indicate national team as defined under FIFA eligibility rules; some limited exceptions apply. Players may hold more than one non-FIFA nationality.

No.	Pos.	Nation	Player
1	GK	ESP	Alberto Varo
2	DF	CMR	Serge Leuko
3	DF	ESP	José Carlos
4	DF	GNB	Marcelo Djaló
5	MF	ESP	Carlos Pita (captain)
6	MF	ESP	Jaume Grau (on loan from Osasuna)
7	FW	ESP	Cristian Herrera
8	MF	ESP	Fernando Seoane (2nd captain)
9	FW	ESP	Manu Barreiro
10	FW	ESP	José Ángel Carrillo
11	MF	GUI	Lass Bangoura (on loan from Rayo)
12	DF	FRA	Mathieu Peybernes (on loan from Almería)
13	GK	ESP	Ander Cantero

No.	Pos.	Nation	Player
14	DF	UKR	Vasyl Kravets (on loan from Leganés)
15	DF	ESP	Roberto Canella
16	FW	ESP	Carlos Castro (on loan from Mallorca)
17	MF	ESP	Jaime Seoane (on loan from Huesca)
18	MF	ESP	Álex López (on loan from Espanyol)
19	MF	ALG	Yanis Rahmani (on loan from Almería)
20	DF	ESP	Gerard Valentín (on loan from Deportivo La Coruña)
21	MF	ESP	Hugo Rama
22	DF	ESP	Edu Campabadal
23	DF	ESP	Josete
24	MF	ESP	Iriome (3rd captain)
28	MF	MTN	Hacen (on loan from Real Valladolid)

=== Out of the team ===
Note: Flags indicate national team as defined under FIFA eligibility rules; some limited exceptions apply. Players may hold more than one non-FIFA nationality.

No.	Pos.	Nation	Player
—	MF	ESP	Borja Domínguez
—	MF	ESP	Antonio Campillo

=== Reserve team ===
Note: Flags indicate national team as defined under FIFA eligibility rules; some limited exceptions apply. Players may hold more than one non-FIFA nationality.

No.	Pos.	Nation	Player
27	MF	ESP	Alex Rey
29	DF	ARG	Matías Vesprini
30	MF	ARG	Juan Brunet
31	GK	ESP	Ángel Fraga

No.	Pos.	Nation	Player
34	FW	VEN	Manuel Morais
37	FW	ESP	Chiqui
38	DF	ESP	Nicolás Manteiga

=== Out on loan ===
Note: Flags indicate national team as defined under FIFA eligibility rules; some limited exceptions apply. Players may hold more than one non-FIFA nationality.

No.	Pos.	Nation	Player
—	GK	ESP	Pablo Cacharrón (at Barakaldo until 30 June 2020)
—	DF	ESP	Borja San Emeterio (at Atlético Baleares until 30 June 2020)
—	DF	UKR	Orest Lebedenko (at Olimpik Donetsk until 30 June 2021)

No.	Pos.	Nation	Player
—	DF	ESP	Pedro López (at Unionistas until 30 June 2020)
—	DF	COL	Jilmar Torres (at Andorra until 30 June 2020)
—	MF	ECU	Gustavo Quezada (at Recreativo until 30 June 2020)

== Pre-season and friendlies ==
Win Draw Loss

31 July 2019 Trofeo Vila de Foz	Lugo	1–1 (5–4 p)	Oviedo	Foz
19:30 CEST (UTC+2)	Tete 33'	Report	Samu Obeng 55'	Stadium: Martínez Otero

== Competitions ==
=== Overview ===
Competition	First match	Last match	Starting round	Final position	Record							
Competition	First match	Last match	Starting round	Final position	Pld	W	D	L	GF	GA	GD	Win %
Segunda División	17 August 2019	20 July 2020	Matchday 1	16th	42	12	16	14	43	54	−11	28.57
Copa del Rey	18 December 2019		First round	First round	1	0	1	0	1	1	+0	0.00
Total					43	12	17	14	44	55	−11	27.91

Source: Competitions

=== Segunda División ===
==== League table ====
Pos	Team	Pld	W	D	L	GF	GA	GD	Pts
14	Málaga	42	11	20	11	35	33	+2	53 (Note: Málaga finished ahead of Oviedo on head-to-head points: Málaga 2–1 Oviedo, Oviedo 1–1 Málaga.)
15	Oviedo	42	13	14	15	49	53	−4	53
16	Lugo	42	12	16	14	43	54	−11	52 (Note: Lugo finished ahead of Albacete on head-to-head points: Albacete 0–1 Lugo, Lugo 1–0 Albacete.)
17	Albacete	42	13	13	16	36	46	−10	52
18	Ponferradina	42	12	15	15	45	50	−5	51 (Note: Ponferradina finished ahead of Deportivo La Coruña on head-to-head goal difference: Ponferradina 2–0 Deportivo La Coruña, Deportivo La Coruña 2–1 Ponferradina.)

Source: LaLiga Soccerway
Rules for classification: 1) points; 2) head-to-head points; 3) head-to-head goal difference; 4) goal difference; 5) number of goals scored

==== Results summary ====
Overall								Home						Away					
Pld	W	D	L	GF	GA	GD	Pts	W	D	L	GF	GA	GD	W	D	L	GF	GA	GD
42	12	16	14	43	54	−11	52	7	8	6	26	31	−5	5	8	8	17	23	−6

Source: La Liga SmartBank

==== Results by round ====
Round	1	2	3	4	5	6	7	8	9	10	11	12	13	14	15	16	17	18	19	20	21	22	23	24	25	26	27	28	29	30	31	32	33	34	35	36	37	38	39	40	41	42
Ground	A	H	A	H	A	H	A	H	A	H	H	A	H	A	H	A	H	A	H	A	H	A	H	A	H	A	A	H	A	H	H	A	H	A	H	A	H	A	H	A	H	A
Result	D	D	L	D	W	D	D	L	D	L	D	W	L	W	W	D	L	D	L	L	D	L	L	W	L	L	D	W	W	D	D	W	L	L	D	L	W	D	W	D	W	W
Position	14	14	19	18	14	13	13	16	17	17	19	18	20	15	14	14	15	15	17	18	18	20	20	18	20	21	21	20	19	19	20	17	18	20	20	20	20	20	20	19	17	16

Source: La Liga SmartBank
A = Away; H = Home; W = Win; D = Draw; L = Loss

==== Matches ====
The fixtures were revealed on 4 July 2019.

17 August 2019 1	Lugo	0–0	Extremadura	Lugo
18:00 CEST (UTC+2)				Stadium: Anxo Carro

24 August 2019 2	Real Oviedo	1–1	Lugo	Oviedo
18:00 CEST (UTC+2)				Stadium: Estadio Carlos Tartiere

1 September 2019 3	Lugo	2–4	Alcorcón	Lugo
18:00 CEST (UTC+2)				Stadium: Anxo Carro

8 September 2019 4	Elche	1–1	Lugo	Elche
18:00 CEST (UTC+2)	Nino 31'		Domínguez 68'	Stadium: Estadio Manuel Martínez Valero

15 September 2019 5	Lugo	2–0	Fuenlabrada	Lugo
20:00 CEST (UTC+2)	Valentín 9'; Herrera 32'			Stadium: Anxo Carro

18 September 2019 6	Lugo	2–2	Ponferradina	Lugo
19:00 CEST (UTC+2)				Stadium: Anxo Carro

21 September 2019 7	Real Zaragoza	0–0	Lugo	Zaragoza
18:00 CEST (UTC+2)		Report		Stadium: La Romareda; Attendance: 24,721; Referee: Víctor Areces Franco

29 September 2019 8	Lugo	1–4	Tenerife	Lugo
21:00 CEST (UTC+2)				Stadium: Anxo Carro

2 October 2019 9	Mirandés	1–1	Lugo	Miranda de Ebro
19:00 CEST (UTC+2)				Stadium: Estadio Municipal de Anduva

5 October 2019 10	Lugo	0–2	Las Palmas	Lugo
16:00 CEST (UTC+2)				Stadium: Anxo Carro

12 October 2019 11	Almería	0–0	Lugo	Almería
16:00 CEST (UTC+2)				Stadium: Estadio de los Juegos Mediterráneos

19 October 2019 12	Lugo	3–2	Huesca	Lugo
CEST (UTC+2)				Stadium: Anxo Carro

26 October 2019 13	Numancia	3–1	Lugo	Soria
20:00 CET (UTC+1)				Stadium: Nuevo Estadio Los Pajaritos

3 November 2019 14	Lugo	1–0	Rayo Vallecano	Lugo
16:00 CET (UTC+1)				Stadium: Anxo Carro

9 November 2019 15	Albacete	0–1	Lugo	Albacete
18:00 CET (UTC+1)				Stadium: Estadio Carlos Belmonte

17 November 2019 16	Lugo	1–1	Racing Santander	Lugo
18:30 CET (UTC+1)	Barreiro 74'	Report	Yoda 31'	Stadium: Anxo Carro; Attendance: 3,163; Referee: Gorka Sagués Oscoz

24 November 2019 17	Cádiz	2–1	Lugo	Cádiz
21:00 CET (UTC+1)	Iza 38', 64'	Report	Iriome 5'	Stadium: Estadio Ramón de Carranza; Attendance: 15,444; Referee: Víctor Areces Franco

1 December 2019 18	Lugo	0–0	Deportivo La Coruña	Lugo
18:00 CET (UTC+1)				Stadium: Anxo Carro

8 December 2019 19	Girona	3–1	Lugo	Girona
12:00 CET (UTC+1)				Stadium: Estadi Montilivi

15 December 2019 20	Lugo	1–2	Sporting Gijón	Lugo
18:00 CET (UTC+1)				Stadium: Anxo Carro

21 December 2019 21	Málaga	1–1	Lugo	Málaga
16:00 CET (UTC+1)				Stadium: La Rosaleda

4 January 2020 22	Lugo	0–4	Almería	Lugo
18:00 CET (UTC+1)				Stadium: Anxo Carro

15 January 2020 23	Rayo Vallecano	1–0	Lugo	Madrid
CET (UTC+1)				Stadium: Campo de Fútbol de Vallecas

18 January 2020 24	Lugo	1–0	Albacete	Lugo
18:15 CET (UTC+1)				Stadium: Anxo Carro

25 January 2020 25	Huesca	2–1	Lugo	Huesca
16:00 CET (UTC+1)				Stadium: Estadio El Alcoraz

1 February 2020 26	Extremadura	1–0	Lugo	Almendralejo
16:00 CET (UTC+1)				Stadium: Estadio Francisco de la Hera

9 February 2020 27	Lugo	2–2	Elche	Lugo
18:15 CET (UTC+1)				Stadium: Anxo Carro

16 February 2020 28	Fuenlabrada	0–1	Lugo	Fuenlabrada
12:00 CET (UTC+1)				Stadium: Estadio Fernando Torres

23 February 2020 29	Lugo	1–0	Real Oviedo	Lugo
12:00 CET (UTC+1)				Stadium: Anxo Carro

1 March 2020 30	Deportivo La Coruña	0–0	Lugo	A Coruña
CET (UTC+1)				Stadium: Estadio Riazor

6 March 2020 31	Lugo	1–1	Cádiz	Lugo
21:00 CET (UTC+1)	Carrillo 81'	Report	Lozano 36'	Stadium: Anxo Carro; Attendance: 3,483; Referee: Rubén Ávalos Barrera

13 June 2020 32	Racing Santander	1–2	Lugo	Santander
17:00 CEST (UTC+2)	Cejudo 12'	Report	Hacen 58'; Pita 70'	Stadium: Campos de Sport de El Sardinero; Attendance: 0 Referee: Daniel Ocón Arráiz

16 June 2020 33	Lugo	1–3	Real Zaragoza	Lugo
19:30 CEST (UTC+2)	Hacen (red card) 77'; Josete 90+2'	Report	Kagawa 19'; Guti 64'; Linares 86'	Stadium: Estadio Anxo Carro; Attendance: 0 Referee: Víctor Areces Franco

20 June 2020 34	Las Palmas	1–0	Lugo	Las Palmas
19:30 CEST (UTC+2)				Stadium: Estadio Gran Canaria

23 June 2020 35	Lugo	0–0	Málaga	Lugo
19:30 CEST (UTC+2)				Stadium: Anxo Carro

28 June 2020 36	Sporting Gijón	2–0	Lugo	Gijón
17:00 CEST (UTC+2)				Stadium: El Molinón

1 July 2020 37	Lugo	3–1	Numancia	Lugo
19:30 CEST (UTC+2)				Stadium: Anxo Carro

5 July 2020 38	Alcorcón	2–2	Lugo	Alcorcón
21:45 CEST (UTC+2)	Costa 1', (yellow card) 59'; Mula 70', (yellow card) 71'; Boateng (yellow card) 90+1'; Arribas (yellow card) 90+5'	Report	Rahmani (yellow card) 36'; Carrillo 47', (yellow card) 51'; Seoane (yellow card) 49'; Campabadal (yellow card) 64'; Hacen 74'	Stadium: Santo Domingo; Attendance: 0 Referee: Jon Ander González Esteban

8 July 2020 39	Ponferradina	0–1	Lugo	Ponferrada
21:45 CEST (UTC+2)	Kaxe (yellow card) 45+5'; Sielva (yellow card) 67'	Report	Marcelo (yellow card) 10'; Hacen (yellow card) 32'; Barreiro (yellow card) 36', (goal) 87' (pen.); Canella (yellow card) 44'; Peybernes (yellow card) 76'	Stadium: El Toralín; Attendance: 0 Referee: Víctor Areces Franco

12 July 2020 40	Lugo	2–2	Girona	Lugo
19:30 CEST (UTC+2)	Iriome 18'; Rahmani (yellow card) 30'; Seoane (yellow card) 65'; Kravets (yellow card) 90+3'; Herrera 90+6'	Report	Stuani 31' (pen.); Calavera (yellow card) 36'; Aday 72'; Miquel (yellow card) 84'	Stadium: Anxo Carro; Attendance: 0 Referee: Saúl Ais Reig

17 July 2020 41	Tenerife	1–2	Lugo	Santa Cruz de Tenerife
21:00 CEST (UTC+2)	Milla 70'; López (yellow card) 82'	Report	Pita (yellow card) 46'; Herrera 54'; Seoane (red card) 60'; Hacen (yellow card) 73', (goal) 90+5'	Stadium: Estadio Heliodoro Rodríguez López; Attendance: 0 Referee: Óliver de la Fuente Ramos

20 July 2020 42	Lugo	2–1	Mirandés	Lugo
21:00 CEST (UTC+2)	Herrera 64', 84'	Report	Marcos André 45+3'	Stadium: Anxo Carro; Attendance: 2,679; Referee: Daniel Ocón Arráiz

=== Copa del Rey ===
18 December 2019 First round	Sestao River	1–1 (a.e.t.) (6–5 p)	Lugo	Sestao
20:00 CET (UTC+1)	Leandro 37'	Report	Herrera 90+2'	Stadium: Las Llanas; Attendance: 3,000; Referee: Víctor Areces Franco
	Penalties
	Gago (penalty scored); Martín (penalty scored); Zumalacárregui (penalty scored); Huidobro (penalty scored); Villar (penalty scored); Alonso (penalty scored)		(penalty scored) Barreiro; (penalty scored) Herrera; (penalty scored) Morais; (penalty scored) López; (penalty scored) José Carlos; (penalty missed) Lebedenko
