= 2020–21 CD Lugo season =

CD Lugo
2020–21 season
- Owner: Frisaqués, S. L.
- President: Tino Saqués
- Head coach: Juanfran (until 11 October); Mehdi Nafti (from 14 October to 28 February); Luis César Sampedro (from 2 March to 19 April); Rubén Albés (from 20 April)
- Stadium: Anxo Carro
- Segunda División: 18th
- Copa del Rey: Second round
Home colours	Away colours

The 2020–21 CD Lugo season was the club's 68th season in existence and its ninth consecutive season in the second division of Spanish football. In addition to the domestic league, Lugo participated in this season's edition of the Copa del Rey. The season covered the period from 21 July 2020 to 30 June 2021.

== Players ==
=== First-team squad ===
As of 1 February 2021

Note: Flags indicate national team as defined under FIFA eligibility rules; some limited exceptions apply. Players may hold more than one non-FIFA nationality.

No.	Pos.	Nation	Player
1	GK	ESP	Alberto Varo
2	MF	ESP	Xavi Torres
3	DF	ESP	Diego Alende (on loan from Valladolid)
4	DF	GBS	Marcelo Djaló
5	MF	ESP	Carlos Pita (captain)
6	MF	ESP	Juanpe Jiménez
7	FW	ESP	Cristian Herrera
8	MF	ESP	Fernando Seoane (2nd captain)
9	FW	ESP	Manu Barreiro
10	MF	ESP	Hugo Rama
11	FW	PHI	José Ángel Carrillo
12	DF	ESP	Pedro López
13	GK	ESP	Ander Cantero

No.	Pos.	Nation	Player
14	MF	ESP	Borja Domínguez
15	DF	ESP	Roberto Canella
16	FW	ESP	Chris Ramos (on loan from Valladolid)
18	MF	MTN	Hacen (on loan from Valladolid)
19	FW	PAN	José Luis Rodríguez (on loan from Alavés)
20	DF	ESP	Gerard Valentín
21	DF	ESP	Luis Ruiz
22	DF	ESP	Edu Campabadal
23	DF	POR	Frederico Venâncio (on loan from Vitória Guimarães)
24	MF	ESP	Iriome (3rd captain)
27	DF	MTN	Bakary N'Diaye
34	GK	ESP	Fran Vieites
37	FW	ENG	Arvin Appiah (on loan from Almería)

=== Out on loan ===
Note: Flags indicate national team as defined under FIFA eligibility rules; some limited exceptions apply. Players may hold more than one non-FIFA nationality.

No.	Pos.	Nation	Player
—	MF	ESP	Álex Rey (at Unionistas until 30 June 2021)
—	DF	ARG	Matías Vesprini (at Compostela until 30 June 2021)

No.	Pos.	Nation	Player
—	MF	ESP	Sebas Moyano (at Ebro until 30 June 2021)
—	FW	ESP	Chiqui (at Marino until 30 June 2021)

== Transfers ==
=== In ===
No.	Pos	Player	Transferred from	Fee	Date	Source
15			TBD		1 July 2020	

=== Out ===
No.	Pos	Player	Transferred to	Fee	Date	Source
15			TBD		1 July 2020	

== Pre-season and friendlies ==
Win Draw Loss

26 August 2020 Friendly	Lugo	1–2	Ponferradina	Lugo, Spain
18:00 CEST (UTC+2)				Stadium: Campo de Fútbol O Ceao; Attendance: 0

30 August 2020 Friendly	Sporting Gijón	1–2	Lugo	Gijón, Spain
12:00 CEST (UTC+2)	Đurđević 22' (pen.)		Iriome 55'; Herrera 85' (pen.)	Stadium: El Molinón; Attendance: 0

2 September 2020 Friendly	Celta Vigo	2–0	Lugo	Vigo, Spain
18:30 CEST (UTC+2)	Mor 66'; Aspas 81' (pen.)			Stadium: Balaídos; Attendance: 0

5 September 2020 Friendly	Lugo	0–1	Mallorca	Lugo, Spain
17:00 CEST (UTC+2)	Quindimil (yellow card) 87'		Bravo 45'	Stadium: Campo de Fútbol O Ceao; Attendance: 0 Referee: Miguel Ferrol Muñiz

== Competitions ==
=== Overview ===
Competition	First match	Last match	Starting round	Final position	Record							
Competition	First match	Last match	Starting round	Final position	Pld	W	D	L	GF	GA	GD	Win %
Segunda División	13 September 2020	30 May 2021	Matchday 1	18th	42	11	14	17	38	53	−15	26.19
Copa del Rey	15 December 2020	7 January 2021	First round	Second round	2	1	0	1	3	3	+0	50.00
Total					44	12	14	18	41	56	−15	27.27

Source: Soccerway

=== Segunda División ===
==== League table ====
Pos	Team	Pld	W	D	L	GF	GA	GD	Pts	Promotion, qualification or relegation
16	Cartagena	42	12	13	17	44	52	−8	49	
17	Alcorcón	42	13	9	20	32	42	−10	48	
18	Lugo	42	11	14	17	38	53	−15	47	
19	Sabadell (R)	42	11	13	18	40	48	−8	46	Relegation to Primera División RFEF
20	UD Logroñés (R)	42	11	11	20	28	53	−25	44	Relegation to Primera División RFEF

Source: LaLiga
Rules for classification: 1) points; 2) head-to-head points; 3) head-to-head goal difference; 4) goal difference; 5) number of goals scored
(R) Relegated

==== Results summary ====
Overall								Home						Away					
Pld	W	D	L	GF	GA	GD	Pts	W	D	L	GF	GA	GD	W	D	L	GF	GA	GD
42	11	14	17	38	53	−15	47	8	8	5	20	16	+4	3	6	12	18	37	−19

Source: La Liga

==== Results by round ====
Round	1	2	3	4	5	6	7	8	9	10	11	12	13	14	15	16	17	18	19	20	21	22	23	24	25	26	27	28	29	30	31	32	33	34	35	36	37	38	39	40	41	42
Ground	A	H	H	A	H	A	H	A	A	H	A	H	A	H	A	H	A	H	A	H	A	H	A	H	A	H	A	H	A	H	H	A	H	A	H	A	H	A	H	A	H	A
Result	L	W	L	L	L	W	W	W	D	W	L	W	L	D	D	D	D	W	L	D	D	W	L	D	L	D	L	D	D	D	L	L	L	L	L	L	D	L	W	D	W	W
Position	20	10	14	18	20	17	12	11	9	6	10	6	10	11	12	12	12	10	11	11	10	10	11	10	12	13	15	15	15	15	15	15	17	17	20	21	21	21	21	19	18	18

Source: La Liga
A = Away; H = Home; W = Win; D = Draw; L = Loss

==== Matches ====
The league fixtures were announced on 31 August 2020.

13 September 2020 1	Fuenlabrada	2–0	Lugo	Fuenlabrada
18:15 CEST (UTC+2)	Ciss (yellow card) 1'; Awudu 64'; Nteka 70'	Report	Barreiro (yellow card) 13'; Rama (yellow card) 20'; Iriome (yellow card) 38'	Stadium: Fernando Torres; Attendance: 0 (Note: The match was played behind closed doors due to the COVID-19 pandemic in Spain.); Referee: Juan Luis Pulido Santana

20 September 2020 2	Lugo	2–1	Leganés	Lugo
12:00 CEST (UTC+2)	Rodríguez 64'; Barreiro 87' (pen.)	Report	Merino 23'	Stadium: Anxo Carro; Attendance: 0 Referee: Daniel Ocón Arráiz

27 September 2020 3	Lugo	0–2	Almería	Lugo
12:00 CEST (UTC+2)		Report	Akieme 8', (yellow card) 50' (yellow-red card) 58'; Aketxe 12'; Costa (yellow card) 26'; Lazo (yellow card) 71'	Stadium: Anxo Carro; Attendance: 0 Referee: Aitor Gorostegui Fernández Ortega

4 October 2020 4	Cartagena	2–1	Lugo	Cartagena
20:30 CEST (UTC+2)	Zorrilla (yellow card) 1', (goal) 29'; Simón (yellow card) 35'; Gallar 61'; De la Bella (yellow card) 84'	Report	Seoane (yellow card) 27'; Campabadal (yellow card) 31'; Djaló (yellow card) 66'; Domínguez (yellow card) 68'; Carrillo 88'; Torres (yellow card) 90+5'	Stadium: Cartagonova; Attendance: 0 Referee: Francisco José Hernández Maeso

11 October 2020 5	Lugo	0–1	Mallorca	Lugo
16:00 CEST (UTC+2)	Carlos Pita (yellow card) 66' (yellow-red card) 90+5'; Torres (yellow card) 73' (yellow-red card) 77'; Luis Ruiz (yellow card) 76'; Valentín (yellow card) 81'	Report	Sevilla 56' (pen.); Cufré (yellow card) 61'; Febas (yellow card) 79'; Rodríguez (yellow card) 83'; Sedlar (yellow card) 88'	Stadium: Estadio Anxo Carro; Attendance: 0 Referee: David Gálvez Rascón

17 October 2020 6	Castellón	0–1	Lugo	Castellón
20:30 CEST (UTC+2)	Lapeña (yellow card) 5'; Gálvez (yellow card) 90+4'	Report	Alende (yellow card) 8'; Iriome (yellow card) 67', (goal) 90+4'; Carrillo (yellow card) 90+5'	Stadium: Nou Estadi Castàlia; Attendance: 0 Referee: Rubén Ávalos Barrera

21 October 2020 7	Lugo	3–0	Girona	Lugo
19:00 CEST (UTC+2)		Report		Stadium: Anxo Carro; Attendance: 0 Referee: Iosu Galech Apezteguía

24 October 2020 8	UD Logroñés	2–3	Lugo	Logroño
18:15 CEST (UTC+2)	Andy 34', 90+2' (pen.)	Report	Rodríguez 53', 86'; Ramos 78'	Stadium: Las Gaunas; Attendance: 0 Referee: Rafael Sánchez López

29 October 2020 9	Tenerife	1–1	Lugo	Santa Cruz de Tenerife
19:00 CET (UTC+1)	Sol 39'	Report	Juanpe 90+5'	Stadium: Heliodoro Rodríguez López; Attendance: 0 Referee: Francisco José Hernández Maeso

1 November 2020 10	Lugo	1–0	Rayo Vallecano	Lugo
20:30 CET (UTC+1)		Report		Stadium: Anxo Carro; Attendance: 0 Referee: Óliver de la Fuente Ramos

7 November 2020 11	Espanyol	2–1	Lugo	Cornellà de Llobregat
21:00 CET (UTC+1)	Embarba 30'; Calero (yellow card) 35'; De Tomás 58'	Report	Carrillo 33'; El Hacen (yellow card) 39'; Juanpe (yellow card) 41'; Campabadal (yellow card) 75'	Stadium: RCDE Stadium; Attendance: 0 Referee: David Gálvez Rascón

14 November 2020 12	Lugo	1–0	Albacete	Lugo
18:30 CET (UTC+1)	Campabadal (red card) 40'; Barreiro 85' (pen.)	Report	Gorosito (yellow card) 8'; Kecojević (yellow card) 90+4'	Stadium: Anxo Carro; Attendance: 0 Referee: Iñaki Vicandi Garrido

20 November 2020 13	Alcorcón	1–0	Lugo	Alcorcón
19:00 CET (UTC+1)	Óscar (yellow card) 64'; Marc Gual 82'; Sosa (red card) 88'	Report	Juanpe (yellow card) 24'; Torres (yellow card) 27'; Canella (yellow card) 37'	Stadium: Santo Domingo; Attendance: 0 Referee: Luis Milla Alvendiz

24 November 2020 14	Lugo	0–0	Oviedo	Lugo
21:30 CET (UTC+1)		Report		Stadium: Anxo Carro; Attendance: 0 Referee: Eduardo Prieto Iglesias

27 November 2020 15	Málaga	2–2	Lugo	Málaga
21:00 CET (UTC+1)	Juande 70', 88'	Report	Rama 27'; Venâncio 40'	Stadium: La Rosaleda; Attendance: 0 Referee: Dámaso Arcediano Monescillo

2 December 2020 16	Lugo	1–1	Las Palmas	Lugo
21:30 CET (UTC+2)	Barreiro 12' (pen.), (red card) 79'; Iriome (yellow card) 66'	Report	Loiodice 19'; Curbelo (yellow card) 33'	Stadium: Estadio Anxo Carro; Attendance: 0 Referee: Jon Ander González Esteban

5 December 2020 17	Mirandés	0–0	Lugo	Miranda de Ebro
18:15 CET (UTC+1)		Report		Stadium: Estadio Municipal de Anduva; Attendance: 0 Referee: Álvaro Moreno Aragón

11 December 2020 18	Lugo	1–0	Ponferradina	Lugo
19:00 CET (UTC+1)		Report		Stadium: Anxo Carro; Attendance: 0 Referee: Daniel Ocón Arráiz

19 December 2020 19	Zaragoza	1–0	Lugo	Zaragoza
21:00 CET (UTC+1)	Amador (yellow card) 64'; Chavarría 69' (yellow card) 88'	Report	Torres (yellow card) 12'; Valentín (yellow card) 40'	Stadium: La Romareda; Attendance: 0 Referee: David Gálvez Rascón

4 January 2021 20	Lugo	0–0	Sporting Gijón	Lugo
21:00 CET (UTC+1)		Report		Stadium: Anxo Carro; Attendance: 0 Referee: Dámaso Arcediano Monescillo

11 January 2021 21	Sabadell	1–1	Lugo	Sabadell
20:30 CET (UTC+1)	Guruzeta 36'	Report	Barreiro 90+4' (pen.)	Stadium: Estadi de la Nova Creu Alta; Attendance: 0 Referee: Iñaki Vicandi Garrido

23 January 2021 22	Lugo	2–0	Tenerife	Lugo
18:15 CET (UTC+1)	Herrera 12'; Rama 54'	Report		Stadium: Anxo Carro; Attendance: 0 Referee: Gorka Sagués Oscoz

1 February 2021 23	Leganés	3–2	Lugo	Leganés
19:00 CET (UTC+1)	Merino 10', 56' (pen.); Pardo 31'	Report	Barreiro 4', 90+4'	Stadium: Estadio Municipal de Butarque; Attendance: 0 Referee: Luis Mario Milla Alvendiz

8 February 2021 24	Lugo	1–1	Espanyol	Lugo
21:00 CET (UTC+1)	Marcelo (yellow card) 4' (yellow-red card) 83'; Campabadal 9'; Juanpe (yellow card) 58'; Canella (yellow card) 80'; Cantero (yellow card) 90'; Seoane (yellow card) 90+1'	Report	Miguelón (yellow card) 20'; De Tomás 71'; Vadillo (yellow card) 90+3'	Stadium: Anxo Carro; Attendance: 0 Referee: Miguel Ángel Ortiz Arias

15 February 2021 25	Oviedo	3–1	Lugo	Oviedo
21:00 CET (UTC+1)	Tejera 28' (pen.); Fernández 63'; Nieto 88'	Report	Rodríguez 13'	Stadium: Carlos Tartiere; Attendance: 0 Referee: Saúl Ais Reig

21 February 2021 26	Lugo	1–1	UD Logroñés	Lugo
20:30 CET (UTC+1)	Barreiro 68'	Report	Andy 57' (pen.)	Stadium: Anxo Carro; Attendance: 0 Referee: Álvaro Moreno Aragón

27 February 2021 27	Almería	4–1	Lugo	Almería
18:15 CET (UTC+1)	Sadiq 11'; Fernandes (yellow card) 41'; Lazo 48'; Corpas 69', 75'; Balliu (yellow card) 85'	Report	Barreiro 41' (pen.)	Stadium: Estadio de los Juegos Mediterráneos; Attendance: 0 Referee: Dámaso Arcediano Monescillo

8 March 2021 28	Lugo	0–0	Fuenlabrada	Lugo
21:00 CET (UTC+1)		Report		Stadium: Estadio Anxo Carro; Attendance: 0 Referee: Daniel Ocón Arráiz

13 March 2021 29	Girona	1–1	Lugo	Girona
18:15 CET (UTC+1)		Report		Stadium: Montilivi; Attendance: 0 Referee: Aitor Gorostegui Fernández-Ortega

21 March 2021 30	Lugo	0–0	Castellón	Lugo
18:15 CET (UTC+1)		Report		Stadium: Anxo Carro; Attendance: 0 Referee: Miguel Ángel Ortiz Arias

28 March 2021 31	Lugo	0–1	Sabadell	Lugo
14:00 CEST (UTC+2)		Report	Ibiza 12'	Stadium: Anxo Carro; Attendance: 0 Referee: Óliver de la Fuente Ramos

1 April 2021 32	Las Palmas	6–1	Lugo	Las Palmas
21:00 CEST (UTC+2)	Lemos (yellow card) 4'; Jesé 13' (pen.); Rober 35' 57' 88'; Araujo 45+2'; Mesa (yellow card) 68'; Cabrera 90'	Report	Juanpe 5'; Luis Ruiz (yellow card) 10'; Torres (yellow card) 12'; Carlos Pita (yellow card) 60'	Stadium: Estadio Gran Canaria; Attendance: 0 Referee: Gorka Sagues Oscoz

4 April 2021 33	Lugo	0–1	Málaga	Lugo
18:15 CEST (UTC+2)		Report	Lombán 84'	Stadium: Anxo Carro; Attendance: 0 Referee: David Gálvez Rascón

11 April 2021 34	Mallorca	2–0	Lugo	Palma
18:15 CEST (UTC+2)	Rodríguez 1'; Mboula (yellow card) 39'; Sedlar (yellow card) 45+1'; Mollejo 63'; Amath (yellow card) 65'	Report	Juanpe (yellow card) 51'; Appiah (yellow card) 90+1'	Stadium: Visit Mallorca Stadium; Attendance: 0 Referee: Daniel Ocón Arráiz

17 April 2021 35	Lugo	1–3	Alcorcón	Lugo
14:00 CEST (UTC+2)	Herrera 49'	Report	Ojeda 21', 72'; Nwakali 81' (pen.)	Stadium: Anxo Carro; Attendance: 0 Referee: Iñaki Vicandi Garrido

24 April 2021 36	Ponferradina	2–0	Lugo	Ponferrada
20:30 CEST (UTC+2)	Adot 10'; Yuri 78'	Report		Stadium: El Toralín; Attendance: 0 Referee: Juan Luis Pulido Santana

30 April 2021 37	Lugo	2–2	Zaragoza	Lugo
21:00 CEST (UTC+2)	Barreiro 44'; Varo (yellow card) 62'; Venâncio 81'; Juanpe (yellow card) 90+6'	Report	Adrián 64' (pen.); Peybernes (yellow card) 68'; Azón (yellow card) 78'; Álvarez 90+7'	Stadium: Anxo Carro; Attendance: 0 Referee: Dámaso Arcediano Monescillo

10 May 2021 38	Sporting Gijón	1–0	Lugo	Gijón
21:00 CEST (UTC+2)	Gragera (yellow card) 26'; Campos 53'; Đurđević (yellow card) 71'; Saúl (yellow card) 74'	Report	Seoane (yellow card) 67'	Stadium: El Molinón; Attendance: 0 Referee: Gorka Sagués Oscoz

15 May 2021 39	Lugo	2–1	Mirandés	Lugo
18:30 CEST (UTC+2)	Venâncio (yellow card) 63'; Valentín (yellow card) 66'; Barreiro 87' (pen.), 90+2' (pen.)	Report	Martínez 40'; Djouahra (yellow card) 65'; Jiménez (yellow card) 85'; Genaro (yellow card) 88'; Lizoain (yellow card) 90+1'	Stadium: Estadio Anxo Carro; Attendance: 0 Referee: Saúl Ais Reig

18 May 2021 40	Albacete	1–1	Lugo	Albacete
21:30 CEST (UTC+2)	Diamanka (yellow card) 30'; Gorosito (yellow card) 39'; Ortuño 45', (yellow card) 53'	Report	Alende (yellow card) 18'; Rodríguez 25', (yellow card) 69'; Ruiz (yellow card) 45+3'	Stadium: Carlos Belmonte; Attendance: 0 Referee: Daniel Jesús Trujillo Suárez

24 May 2021 41	Lugo	2–1	Cartagena	Lugo
21:00 CEST (UTC+2)	Valentín 19', 67'	Report	José Ángel 72'	Stadium: Anxo Carro; Attendance: 0 Referee: Miguel Ángel Ortiz Arias

30 May 2021 42	Rayo Vallecano	0–1	Lugo	Madrid
21:00 CEST (UTC+2)	Martín (yellow card) 70'	Report	Barreiro 43' (pen.); Alende (yellow card) 90+3'; Canella (yellow card) 90+7'	Stadium: Vallecas; Attendance: 0 Referee: Juan Luis Pulido Santana

=== Copa del Rey ===
15 December 2020 First round	Atlético Pulpileño	1–2	Lugo	Pulpí
18:00 CET (UTC+1)	P. Montero 67'	Report	El Hacen 57', 88'	Stadium: San Miguel; Referee: Rafael Sánchez López

7 January 2021 Second round	Girona	2–1 (a.e.t.)	Lugo	Girona
21:00 CET (UTC+1)	Franquesa (yellow card) 53'; Marcelo 115' (o.g.); Bueno 120+3'	Report	Escobar (yellow card) 37'; Valentín (yellow card) 52'; Ramos 103'; Seoane (yellow card) 105'; Torres (yellow card) 106'	Stadium: Montilivi; Referee: Eduardo Prieto Iglesias
