= Álex Ramos =

Spanish footballer

Personal information
- Full name: Alejandro Ramos Rodríguez
- Date of birth: 11 April 2000 (age 26)
- Place of birth: Arteixo, Spain
- Height: 1.90 m (6 ft 3 in)
- Position: Attacking midfielder

Team information
- Current team: La Solana

Youth career
- Atlético Arteixo
- Montañeros
- 2013–2014: Celta
- 2014–2017: Espanyol
- 2017: Valladolid
- 2017–2018: Racing Ferrol
- 2018–2019: Lugo

Senior career*
Years	Team	Apps	(Gls)
2019–2020	Arzúa	24	(2)
2020–2021	Fisterra	33	(8)
2021–2023	Polvorín	59	(8)
2022–2023	Lugo	1	(0)
2023–2025	Bergantiños	63	(7)
2025–	La Solana	10	(0)
- * Club domestic league appearances and goals as of 8 November 2025

Alejandro "Álex" Ramos Rodríguez (born 11 April 2000) is a Spanish footballer who plays as an attacking midfielder for Tercera Federación club La Solana.

== Club career ==
Born in Arteixo, A Coruña, Galicia, Ramos began his career with hometown side Atlético Arteixo, and subsequently represented Montañeros CF and RC Celta de Vigo before joining RCD Espanyol's youth setup in 2014. He left in 2017 to Real Valladolid, and played for Racing de Ferrol before finishing his formation with CD Lugo.

In 2019, Ramos signed for Tercera División side CSD Arzúa, and was a regular starter during most of the campaign. He moved to SD Fisterra in Tercera División RFEF on 28 August 2020, being a first-choice before returning to Lugo on 9 July 2021 and being assigned to the farm team also in the fifth tier.

Ramos made his first team debut on 12 November 2022, starting in a 1–0 away loss against Arenas Club de Getxo, for the season's Copa del Rey. He made his professional debut eight days later, replacing El Hacen in a 4–0 Segunda División loss at FC Andorra.
