= Jesús Fernández =

Jesús Fernández may refer to:

- Jesús Fernández Vaquero (1953–2021), Spanish schoolteacher and politician
- Jesús Fernández (handballer, born 1962), Spanish handball player
- Jesús Fernández (handballer, born 1974), Spanish Olympic handball player
- Jesús Fernández (basketball) (born 1975), Spanish basketball player
- Jesús Fernández (footballer, born 1988), Spanish football player
- Jesús Fernández (footballer, born 2000), Spanish football player
- Suso (footballer) (Jesús Joaquín Fernández, born 1993), Spanish football player
