= Christian Martínez (footballer, born 2000) =

Spanish footballer

Personal information
- Full name: Christian Martínez Díaz
- Date of birth: 13 October 2000 (age 26)
- Place of birth: A Coruña, Spain
- Height: 1.83 m (6 ft 0 in)
- Position: Forward

Team information
- Current team: Águilas
- Number: 9

Youth career
- Montañeros
- 2017–2018: Orillamar
- 2018–2019: Lugo

Senior career*
Years	Team	Apps	(Gls)
2019–2023	Polvorín	59	(21)
2021–2022	→ La Nucía (loan)	8	(1)
2022	→ Bergantiños (loan)	14	(5)
2023	Lugo	1	(0)
2023	Villalbés	14	(2)
2024	La Nucía	16	(2)
2024–2025	Cacereño	20	(9)
2025–	Águilas	41	(18)
- * Club domestic league appearances and goals as of 7 May 2026

Christian Martínez Díaz (born 13 October 2000) is a Spanish footballer who plays as a forward for Segunda Federación club Águilas.

== Club career ==
Born in A Coruña, Galicia, Martínez joined CD Lugo's youth setup in 2018, after representing Orillamar SD and Atlético Coruña Montañeros CF. He was promoted to the farm team in Tercera División ahead of the 2019–20 season, and made his senior debut on 25 August 2019 by coming on as a second-half substitute for Chiqui in a 1–0 away loss against Arosa SC.

On 9 August 2021, Martínez was loaned to Segunda División RFEF side CF La Nucía for the campaign. The following 27 January, after being rarely used, he moved to fellow league team Bergantiños CF also in a temporary deal.

Back to Lugo and its B-side for 2022–23, Martínez made his first team debut on 24 March 2023, replacing Pablo Clavería late into a 2–0 Segunda División away loss against FC Cartagena.
