= Ces Cotos =

Venezuelan footballer (born 2000)

Personal information
- Full name: César Alejandro Rodríguez Cotos
- Date of birth: 7 March 2000 (age 26)
- Place of birth: Barquisimeto, Venezuela
- Height: 1.79 m (5 ft 10 in)
- Position: Midfielder

Team information
- Current team: Utebo
- Number: 17

Youth career
- 2006–2010: Calasanz
- 2010–2019: Deportivo La Coruña

Senior career*
Years	Team	Apps	(Gls)
2019–2020	Paiosaco	21	(1)
2020–2021	Ourense	49	(2)
2022	Olympiacos Volos	17	(4)
2022–2023	Polvorín	25	(1)
2022–2023	Lugo	4	(0)
2023–2025	SS Reyes	40	(3)
2025–	Utebo	30	(3)
- * Club domestic league appearances and goals as of 7 May 2026

César Alejandro Rodríguez "Ces" Cotos (born 7 March 2000) is a Venezuelan footballer who plays as a central midfielder for Spanish Segunda Federación club Utebo.

== Club career ==
Born in Barquisimeto, Cotos moved to A Coruña, Spain with only five months of age, and began his career with local side CD Calasanz at the age of six. In 2010, he joined Deportivo de La Coruña's youth sides.

In 2019, after finishing his formation, Cotos signed for Tercera División side UD Paiosaco. On 1 September of the following year, after featuring regularly, he moved to fellow league team Ourense CF.

On 22 January 2022, Cotos left Ourense and signed for Super League Greece 2 side Olympiacos Volos FC. He made his debut for the club eight days later, coming on as a first-half substitute and scoring the equalizer in a 1–1 away draw against Apollon Larissa FC. He scored four goals in 17 appearances during the second half of the season, as his side suffered relegation.

In 2022, Cotos returned to Spain and agreed to a contract with CD Lugo, being assigned to the farm team in Segunda Federación. He made his first team debut on 23 October of that year, replacing Jaume Cuéllar in a 2–0 Segunda División home win over Burgos CF.
