= Manuel Morais =

Venezuelan footballer (born 1998)

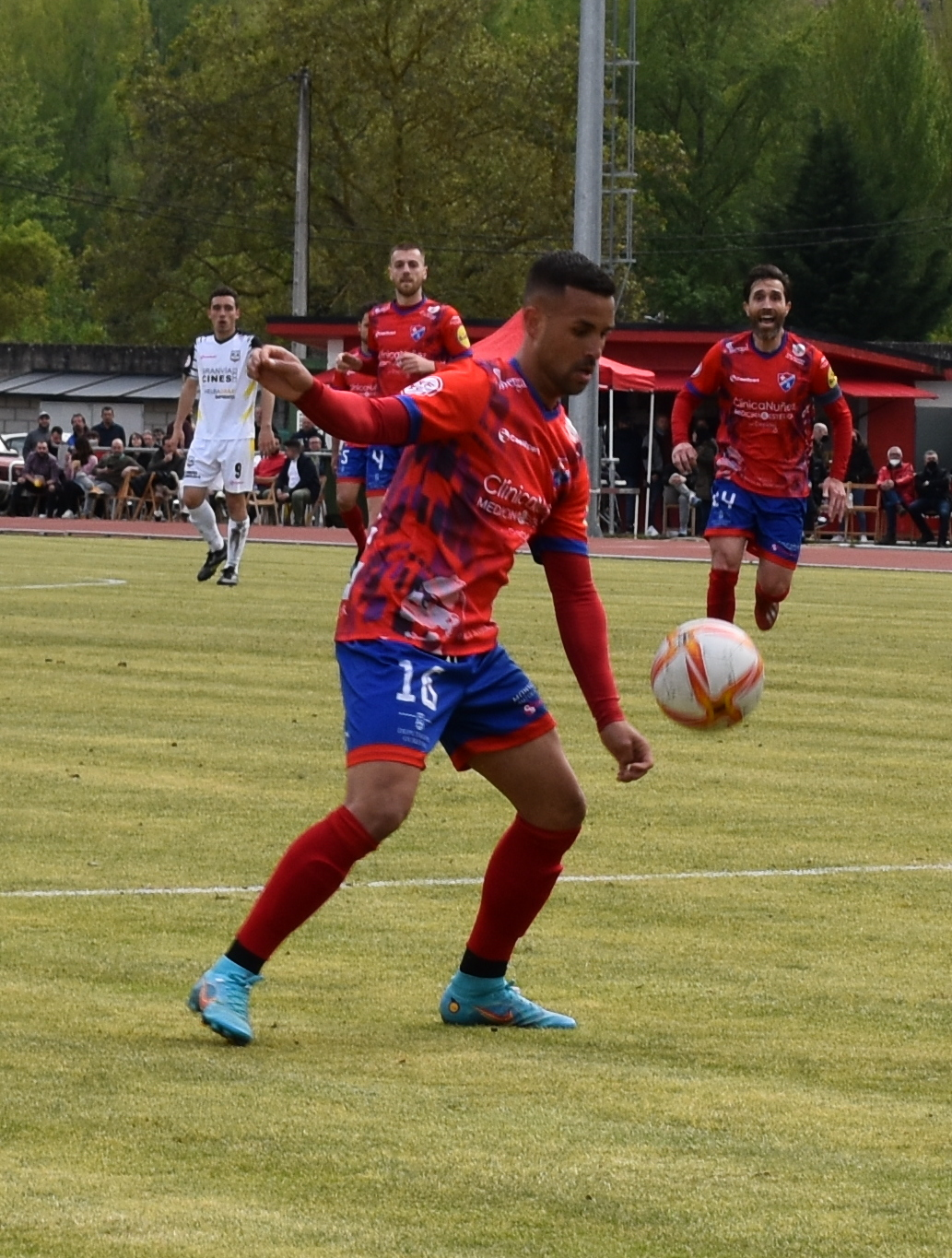

Personal information
- Full name: Manuel Antonio Morais Valerio
- Date of birth: 3 February 1998 (age 28)
- Place of birth: Caracas, Venezuela
- Height: 1.81 m (5 ft 11 in)
- Positions: Winger; forward

Team information
- Current team: Polvorín
- Number: 7

Youth career
- Monagas
- 2015–2016: Tondela
- 2016–2017: Lugo

Senior career*
Years	Team	Apps	(Gls)
2017–	Polvorín	71	(21)
2019–	Lugo	1	(0)
- * Club domestic league appearances and goals as of 12 July 2020

Manuel Antonio Morais Valerio (born 3 February 1998) is a Venezuelan professional footballer who plays as either a winger or a forward for SDC Polvorín.

== Club career ==
Born in Caracas, Morais moved to Spain in 2016, after representing C.D. Tondela and Monagas SC. Initially agreeing to a contract with Club Lemos, he opted to cancel the agreement and joined CD Lugo's youth setup instead.

Ahead of the 2017–18 season, Morais was assigned to the farm team also in the regional leagues, and helped in the club's promotion to the Tercera División with seven goals. On 1 December 2019, he scored a hat-trick for the side in a 6–0 home routing of CD As Pontes.

Morais made his first team debut for the Galicians on 18 December 2019, coming on as a late substitute for Chiqui in a 1–1 away draw against Sestao River Club, in the season's Copa del Rey; he also converted his penalty in the shoot-out, but his side were knocked out after a 6–5 loss. The following 3 July, he renewed his contract for a further year.

Morais made his professional debut on 12 July 2020, replacing Yanis Rahmani late into a 2–2 home draw against Girona FC in the Segunda División.
