= Brais Méndez =

Spanish footballer (born 1997)

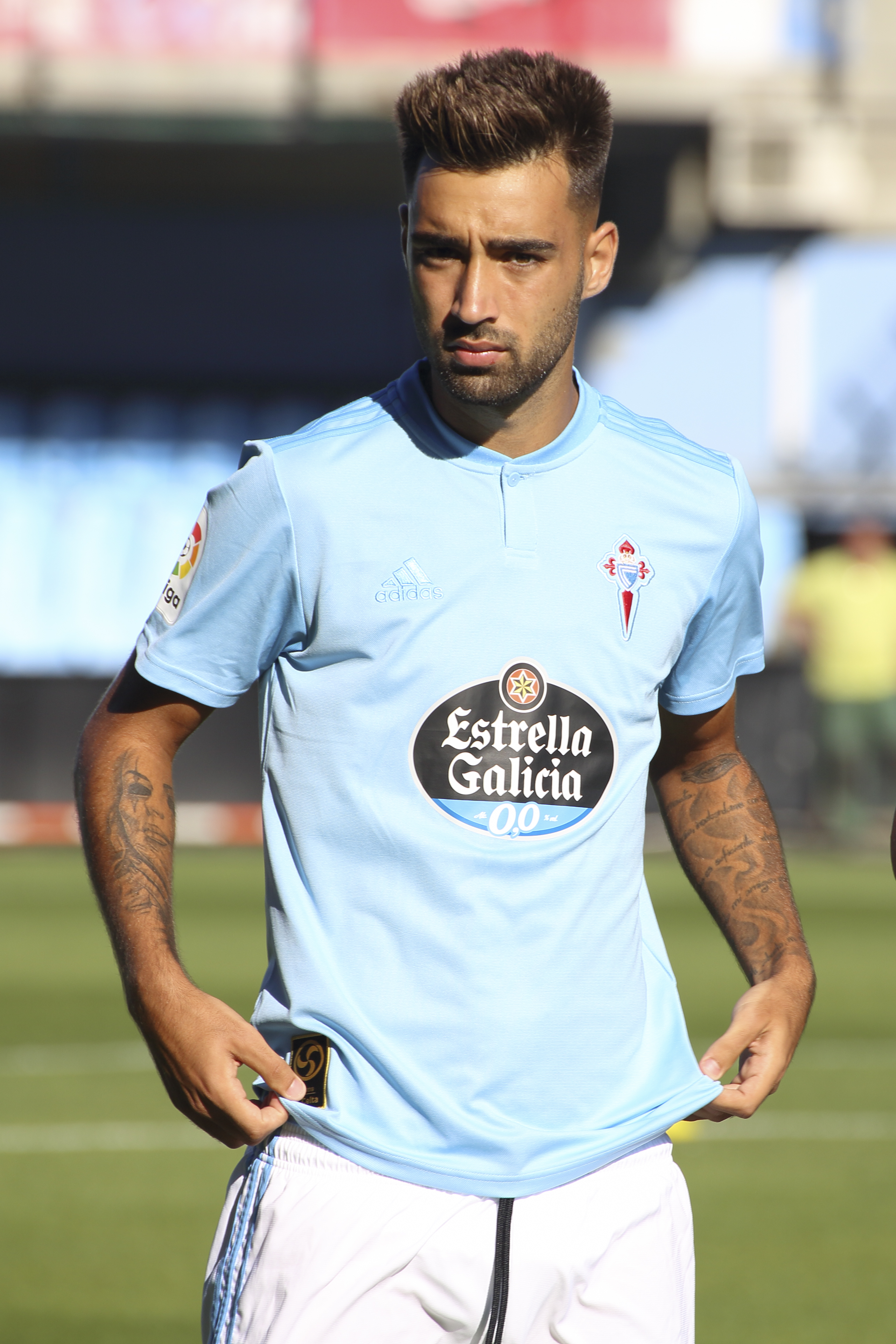
- Méndez with Celta in 2018

Personal information
- Full name: Brais Méndez Portela
- Date of birth: 7 January 1997 (age 29)
- Place of birth: Mos, Spain
- Height: 1.87 m (6 ft 2 in)
- Position: Attacking midfielder

Team information
- Current team: Columbus Crew
- Number: 10

Youth career
- 2001–2002: Sárdoma
- 2002–2010: Santa Mariña
- 2010–2012: Villarreal
- 2012–2015: Celta

Senior career*
Years	Team	Apps	(Gls)
2014–2017	Celta B	56	(8)
2017–2022	Celta	153	(20)
2022–2026	Real Sociedad	122	(22)
2026–	Columbus Crew	14	(6)

International career
2014	Spain U17	3	(0)
2015	Spain U18	2	(0)
2018	Spain U21	2	(0)
2018–2021	Spain	4	(1)
- * Club domestic league appearances and goals as of 8 November 2026

Brais Méndez Portela (born 7 January 1997) is a Spanish professional footballer who plays as an attacking midfielder for Major League Soccer club Columbus Crew.

He took part in 275 La Liga games over nine seasons for Celta and Real Sociedad, making 166 competitive appearances for both clubs (22 and 33 goals scored, respectively) and winning the 2025–26 Copa del Rey with the latter. In July 2026, he signed with the Columbus Crew.

Méndez made his full debut for Spain in 2018.

== Club career ==
=== Youth career ===
Born in Mos, Pontevedra, Galicia, Méndez played futsal with Sárdoma aged 5, moving to association football with Santa Mariña. He joined Villarreal's youth setup in 2010, but left two years later due to homesickness.

=== Celta ===
Méndez completed his development at Celta de Vigo. He made his senior debut with their reserves on 7 September 2014, starting in a 1–0 Segunda División B away win against Real Murcia.

Méndez scored his first senior goal on 4 September 2016, netting his team's second in a 3–1 victory at Palencia. The following 21 August, after spending the whole preseason with the main squad, he renewed his contract until 2021.

On 21 September 2017, Méndez made his professional – and La Liga – debut, starting in the 1–1 home draw against Getafe. He scored his first goal in the competition on 31 March 2018, equalising a 1–1 away draw with Athletic Bilbao.

On 30 July 2020, Méndez extended his contract until 2024. The ensuing season was his most prolific with nine goals, including both in a win over Alavés at the Balaídos Stadium on 20 December.

=== Real Sociedad ===
On 6 July 2022, Real Sociedad reached an agreement with Celta for the transfer of Méndez, with the player signing a contract until 2028. On his European debut on 8 September, he scored the only goal to help defeat Manchester United at Old Trafford in the group stage of the UEFA Europa League, through a penalty.

Méndez also scored in his maiden appearance in the UEFA Champions League, opening an eventual 1–1 home draw against Inter Milan on 20 September 2023 in the group phase.

Midway through the 2025–26 campaign, following the appointment of new head coach Pellegrino Matarazzo, Méndez saw his minutes drastically reduced. He did score six times in all competitions.

=== Columbus Crew ===
On 2 July 2026, Méndez was announced as a new signing for the Columbus Crew, signing a three-year deal. He made his debut on 1 August, scoring through a free kick in a 2–2 draw away to Inter Miami.

== International career ==
After playing for Spain at under-17, under-18 and under-21 levels, Méndez was first called by the full side on 8 November 2018 for matches against Croatia and Bosnia and Herzegovina. He made his debut in the latter fixture, coming on as a 59th-minute substitute for Suso in the 1–0 friendly win in Las Palmas and scoring the only goal.

== Style of play ==
A highly technical player, Méndez has been praised for his passing range, vision and work-rate.

== Personal life ==
Méndez's father, Modesto (known as Pupi), was also a footballer. A forward, he appeared in one Segunda División match with Deportivo de La Coruña.

== Career statistics ==
=== Club ===
As of match played 21 November 2026

Appearances and goals by club, season and competition
Club	Season	League			National cup (Note: Includes Copa del Rey, U.S. Open Cup)		Continental		Other		Total	
Club	Season	Division	Apps	Goals	Apps	Goals	Apps	Goals	Apps	Goals	Apps	Goals
Celta B	2014–15	Segunda División B	3	0	—		—		—		3	0
Celta B	2015–16	Segunda División B	7	0	—		—		—		7	0
Celta B	2016–17	Segunda División B	36	6	—		—		2 (Note: Appearances in Segunda División B play-offs)	0	38	6
Celta B	2017–18	Segunda División B	10	2	—		—		4	0	14	2
Celta B	Total		56	8	0	0	0	0	6	0	62	8
Celta	2017–18	La Liga	20	1	4	0	—		—		24	1
Celta	2018–19	La Liga	31	6	1	0	—		—		32	6
Celta	2019–20	La Liga	31	0	3	1	—		—		34	1
Celta	2020–21	La Liga	34	9	2	0	—		—		36	9
Celta	2021–22	La Liga	37	4	3	1	—		—		40	5
Celta	Total		153	20	13	2	0	0	0	0	166	22
Real Sociedad	2022–23	La Liga	34	8	5	1	8 (Note: Appearances in UEFA Europa League)	2	—		47	11
Real Sociedad	2023–24	La Liga	32	5	5	0	7 (Note: Appearances in UEFA Champions League)	3	—		44	8
Real Sociedad	2024–25	La Liga	27	3	5	3	12	2	—		44	8
Real Sociedad	2025–26	La Liga	29	6	2	0	—		—		31	6
Real Sociedad	Total		122	22	17	4	27	7	0	0	166	33
Columbus Crew	2026	Major League Soccer	14	6	2	1	—		5 (Note: Four appearances and two goals in Leagues Cup, one appearance in MLS Cup playoffs)	2	21	9
Career total			345	56	32	7	27	7	11	2	415	72

=== International ===
Appearances and goals by national team and year
National team	Year	Apps	Goals
Spain	2018	1	1
Spain	2021	3	0
Total		4	1

Spain score listed first, score column indicates score after each Méndez goal.

List of international goals scored by Brais Méndez
No.	Date	Venue	Opponent	Score	Result	Competition
1.	18 November 2018	Estadio Gran Canaria, Las Palmas, Spain	Bosnia and Herzegovina	1–0	1–0	Friendly

== Honours ==
Real Sociedad

- Copa del Rey: 2025–26
