= Carlos Pita (footballer) =

Spanish footballer

Personal information
- Full name: Carlos Pita González
- Date of birth: 8 December 1984 (age 41)
- Place of birth: A Coruña, Spain
- Height: 1.85 m (6 ft 1 in)
- Position: Midfielder

Youth career
- Deportivo La Coruña

Senior career*
Years	Team	Apps	(Gls)
2003–2008	Deportivo B		
2005	Deportivo La Coruña	1	(0)
2006–2007	→ Logroñés (loan)	35	(5)
2008–2009	Valencia B	29	(3)
2009–2010	Guadalajara	38	(1)
2010–2022	Lugo	408	(27)
Total		511	(36)
- * Club domestic league appearances and goals

Carlos Pita González (born 8 December 1984) is a Spanish former professional footballer who played as a midfielder.

== Club career ==
=== Deportivo ===
Pita was born in A Coruña, Galicia, and was a Deportivo de La Coruña youth graduate. After making his first-team debut in a 2–0 away win over CCD Cerceda in the second round of the Copa del Rey on 26 October 2004, he first appeared in La Liga on 29 May 2005, coming on as a late substitute for Aldo Duscher in the 1–1 away draw against CD Numancia.

In 2006, Pita moved on loan to Segunda División B club CD Logroñés. He returned to the Estadio Riazor in July of the following year, being assigned back to the reserves (now also in the third division) and subsequently representing Valencia CF Mestalla and CD Guadalajara in the same league.

=== Lugo ===
Pita was announced at fellow third-tier side CD Lugo in July 2010, and achieved promotion to the Segunda División at the end of the 2011–12 season under manager Quique Setién. He made his debut in the division on 18 August 2012, starting in a 1–0 home defeat of Hércules CF.

On 3 March 2018, aged 33, Pita scored his first brace as a professional, in the 2–1 victory against Granada CF also at the Estadio Anxo Carro. An undisputed starter during his spell, he appeared in 414 matches in all competitions, including 328 and 20 goals in division two.

On 23 May 2022, Lugo announced the departure of 37-year-old Pita at the end of the season, along with fellow team captains Fernando Seoane and Iriome. He was immediately named the club's sporting director.
