= Gustavo Quezada =

Ecuadorian footballer (born 1997)

Personal information
- Full name: Gustavo Mauricio Quezada Reinoso
- Date of birth: 6 April 1997 (age 29)
- Place of birth: Guayaquil, Ecuador
- Height: 1.73 m (5 ft 8 in)
- Position: Midfielder

Team information
- Current team: Badajoz

Youth career
- 2007–2016: Getafe

Senior career*
Years	Team	Apps	(Gls)
2015–2018	Getafe B	56	(4)
2016–2017	Getafe	2	(0)
2018–2020	Polvorín	17	(0)
2019–2020	→ Recreativo (loan)	24	(0)
2020–2021	Marbella	22	(0)
2022	Antequera	4	(1)
2022–2023	San Roque	12	(2)
2023	Calahorra	5	(0)
2023–2024	Llerenense	24	(2)
2024–	Badajoz	1	(0)
- * Club domestic league appearances and goals as of 6 October 2024

Gustavo Mauricio Quezada Reinoso (born 6 April 1997) is an Ecuadorian footballer who plays as a midfielder for Spanish club Badajoz.

== Club career ==
Born in Guayaquil, Quezada joined Getafe CF's youth setup in 2007, aged ten. On 14 February 2015, while still a junior, he made his senior debut with the reserves by coming on as a substitute in a 0–1 Segunda División B home loss against CD Tudelano; it was his maiden appearance of the campaign.

Quezada was definitely promoted to the B-team in June 2015, appearing more regularly afterwards. On 17 December 2016 he made his first team debut, replacing Álvaro Jiménez in a 3–1 home win against Real Valladolid in the Segunda División championship.

On 11 July 2018, free agent Quezada signed a two-year deal with CD Lugo, being assigned to the farm team in Tercera División. Roughly one year later, he moved to third division side Recreativo de Huelva on loan for the season.

On 20 August 2020, Quezada agreed to a one-year contract with Marbella FC in the third tier. In April 2022, Quezada joined Antequera. A few months later, on 30 June 2022, he then signed with San Roque. On 12 January 2023, his contract was terminated. Later on the same day, he signed with Calahorra.
