= Luis Díaz (Spanish footballer) =

Spanish footballer

Personal information
- Full name: Luis Díaz Carballido
- Date of birth: 27 February 1995 (age 31)
- Place of birth: Lugo, Spain
- Height: 1.87 m (6 ft 2 in)
- Position: Midfielder

Team information
- Current team: Somozas
- Number: 6

Youth career
- 2004–2012: Milagrosa

Senior career*
Years	Team	Apps	(Gls)
2010–2016	Milagrosa		
2016–2020	Polvorín	106	(5)
2017	Lugo	0	(0)
2020–2021	Sarriana	13	(2)
2021–	Somozas	52	(3)
- * Club domestic league appearances and goals as of 12 March 2023

Luis Díaz Carballido (born 27 February 1995) is a Spanish footballer who plays for UD Somozas as a central midfielder.

== Club career ==
Born in Lugo, Galicia, Díaz was a SCD Milagrosa youth graduate, joining their youth setup in 2004. He made his senior debut in the 2010–11 season, in the regional leagues.

In 2016, Díaz moved to CD Lugo, being initially assigned to the farm team also in the lower levels. He made his first team debut on 5 September of the following year, coming on as a substitute for fellow youth graduate Pedro López in a 1–1 Copa del Rey away draw against Gimnàstic de Tarragona (3–1 win on penalties).

Díaz left Polvorín in 2020 and moved to SD Sarriana in the regional leagues. In July 2021, he agreed to a contract with Tercera División RFEF side UD Somozas.
