= Yelko Pino =

Spanish footballer

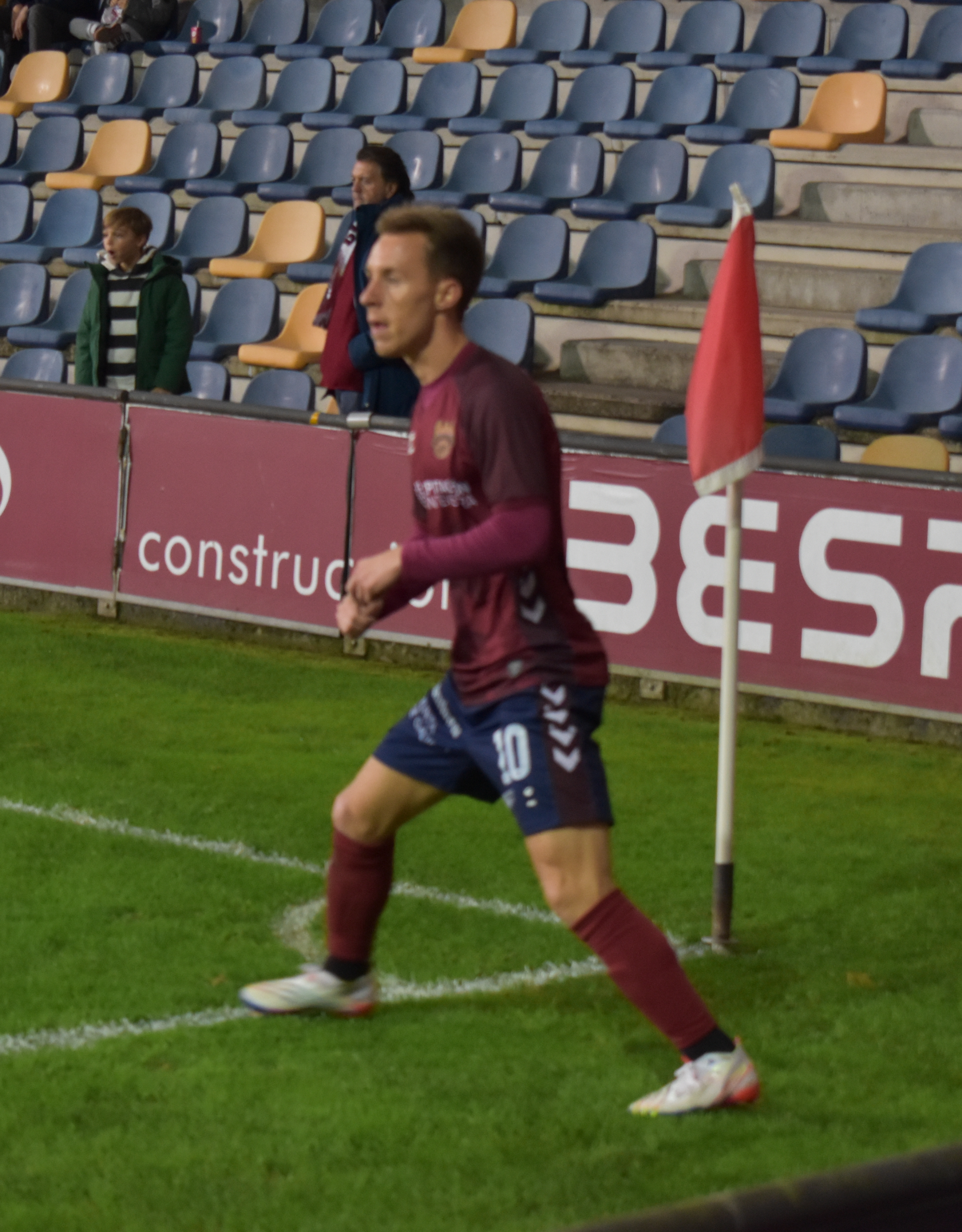
- Pino with Pontevedra in 2022

Personal information
- Full name: Yelko Pino Caride
- Date of birth: 30 October 1996 (age 30)
- Place of birth: Vigo, Spain
- Height: 1.72 m (5 ft 7 1/2 in)
- Position: Attacking midfielder

Team information
- Current team: Pontevedra
- Number: 10

Youth career
- Santa Mariña
- 2007–2013: Celta

Senior career*
Years	Team	Apps	(Gls)
2013–2016	Celta B	47	(3)
2015–2016	→ Swindon Town (loan)	0	(0)
2016	→ Queens Park Rangers (loan)	0	(0)
2016–2018	Lugo	15	(1)
2017–2018	→ Cultural Leonesa (loan)	3	(0)
2018	→ Ponferradina (loan)	6	(0)
2018–2019	Atlético Baleares	11	(0)
2020–2021	Algeciras	16	(0)
2021–	Pontevedra	160	(22)

International career
2012	Spain U16	5	(0)
2012	Spain U17	4	(1)
2014	Spain U18	2	(0)
2013–2014	Spain U19	8	(2)
- * Club domestic league appearances and goals as of 9 June 2026

Yelko Pino Caride (born 30 October 1996) is a Spanish footballer who plays for Pontevedra CF as an attacking midfielder.

== Club career ==
Born in Vigo, Galicia, Pino joined Celta de Vigo's youth setup in 2007 at the age of 11, after starting it out at UD Santa Mariña. He renewed his contract with the former on 23 February 2013, signing until 2018.

In the 2013 summer Pino was promoted to the reserves in Segunda División B, making his senior debut on 25 August of that year by starting in a 2–0 away win against UD Logroñés. He scored his first goal as a senior on 4 May of the following year, netting his team's first in a 2–3 home loss against SD Noja.

On 31 July 2015, Pino refused to play with Celta's B-side after previously agreeing to receive a first-team place in his contract. On 9 September, after altercations with the board, he was loaned to English League One club Swindon Town for one season.

On 2 February 2016, after spending the half of the campaign unregistered, Pino was loaned to Queens Park Rangers until June. On 13 July, he signed a three-year contract with Segunda División side CD Lugo.

Pino made his professional debut on 27 August 2016, starting in a 3–3 home draw against Real Zaragoza. He scored his first goal the following 2 April, netting the game's only in a home success over CF Reus Deportiu.

On 14 July 2017, Pino was loaned to fellow second tier club Cultural y Deportiva Leonesa for one year. The following 18 January, his loan contract was terminated after he was recorded by teammate Emi Buendía making some aggravating insults to the club; the following day, he joined rivals SD Ponferradina.
