= Roberto Trashorras =

Spanish footballer (born 1981)

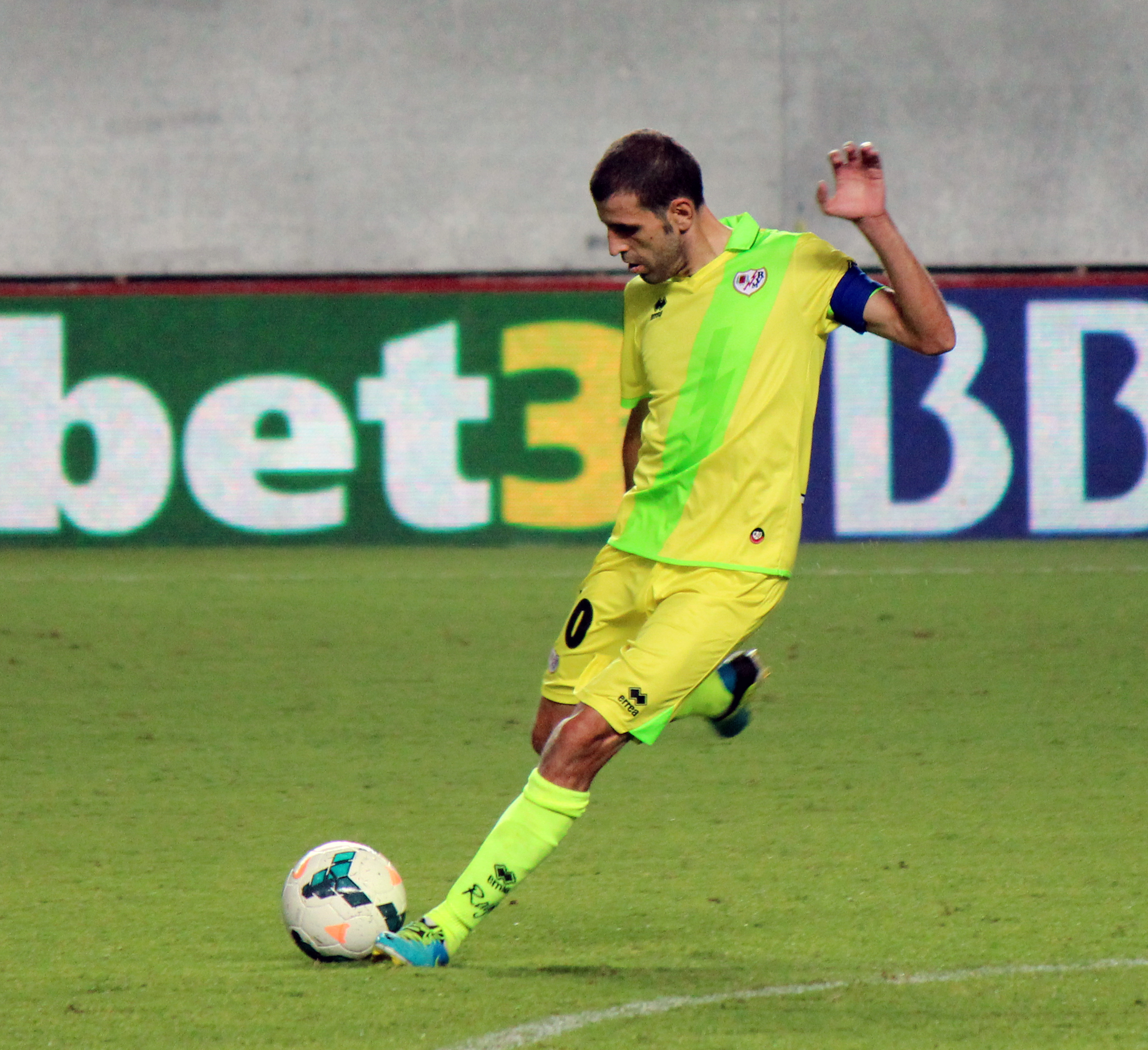
- Trashorras playing for Rayo Vallecano in 2013

Personal information
- Full name: Roberto Trashorras Gayoso
- Date of birth: 28 February 1981 (age 45)
- Place of birth: Rábade, Spain
- Height: 1.77 m (5 ft 9 1/2 in)
- Position: Midfielder

Youth career
- 1989–1995: Racing Villalbés
- 1995–1999: Barcelona

Senior career*
Years	Team	Apps	(Gls)
1999	Barcelona C	9	(4)
1999–2003	Barcelona B	107	(29)
2001	Barcelona	1	(0)
2003–2005	Real Madrid B	65	(10)
2005–2006	Numancia	12	(1)
2006–2008	Las Palmas	62	(11)
2008–2011	Celta	107	(17)
2011–2018	Rayo Vallecano	211	(8)
Total		574	(80)

International career
1997	Spain U16	2	(1)
1998–1999	Spain U17	9	(6)
1999–2000	Spain U18	8	(4)
2001	Spain U20	1	(0)

Managerial career
- 2021–2022: Lugo (youth)
- 2022–2023: Polvorín
- 2023–2024: Polvorín
- 2024: Lugo
- * Club domestic league appearances and goals

Roberto Trashorras Gayoso (born 28 February 1981) is a Spanish former professional footballer who played as a central midfielder, currently a manager.

Having come through Barcelona's academy, he spent most of his career with Rayo Vallecano, appearing in 219 competitive matches. Totalling both clubs, he amassed La Liga totals of 171 games and seven goals.

== Playing career ==
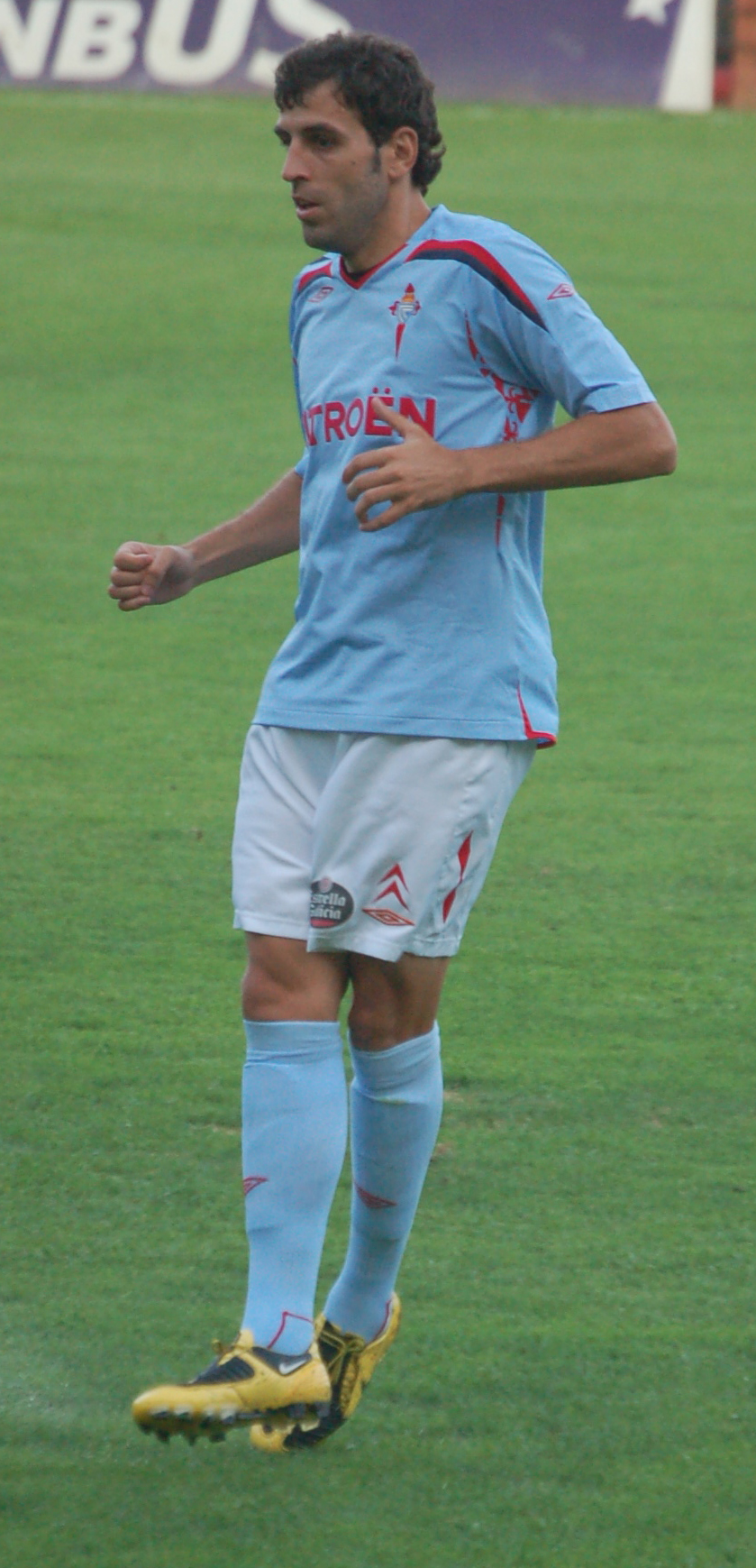
Trashorras in action for Celta in 2009

Born in Rábade, Province of Lugo, Galicia, Trashorras finished his youth career with Barcelona, playing one game with the first team on 6 October 2001, a 2–1 La Liga away loss against Deportivo de La Coruña where he came on as a second-half substitute for Alfonso Pérez. In the summer of 2003 he moved to Real Madrid, only managing to appear for their reserves.

Trashorras joined Segunda División side Numancia for 2005–06. He featured very little during his tenure – less than one third of the games– and switched to Las Palmas also in that league the following season, finally establishing himself in professional football.

In July 2008, Trashorras signed a five-year contract with Celta of division two. An undisputed starter from the beginning, he had his best season in 2009–10, scoring nine goals in 38 matches and helping the Galicians to the quarter-finals of the Copa del Rey, where they were ousted by eventual finalists Atlético Madrid (2–1 on aggregate, with the player netting in the first leg in Madrid in a 1–1 draw).

On 11 August 2011, after reaching an agreement to terminate his contract with Celta, Trashorras moved to Rayo Vallecano, recently promoted to the top tier. On 31 January 2018, after seven seasons as first choice and captain, the 37-year-old left the club.

On 29 August 2018, after several months of inactivity, Trashorras announced his retirement.

== Coaching career ==
On 27 July 2021, Trashorras began working as a manager after being appointed at Lugo's youth sides. In June 2022, he upgraded to the reserve team in the Segunda Federación, being relegated in his debut campaign and leaving on 28 June 2023.

Trashorras returned to Polvorín on 11 December 2023, following the sacking of Roberto Fernández. Two months later, he was named at the helm of the main squad in the Primera Federación, becoming their third coach of the season after Pedro Munitis and Paulo Alves.

On 3 June 2024, Trashorras left Lugo by mutual consent after failing to qualify the team for the play-offs.

== Managerial statistics ==
As of 25 May 2024

Managerial record by team and tenure
Team	Nat	From	To	Record								Ref
Team	Nat	From	To	G	W	D	L	GF	GA	GD	Win %	Ref
Polvorín	(Spain)	20 June 2022	28 June 2023	34	5	11	18	30	47	−17	14.71	
Polvorín	(Spain)	11 December 2023	19 February 2024	8	3	3	2	8	5	+3	37.50	
Lugo	(Spain)	19 February 2024	3 June 2024	14	4	4	6	20	24	−4	28.57	
Career total				56	12	18	26	58	76	−18	21.43	—
