= Dani Vidal (footballer) =

Spanish footballer

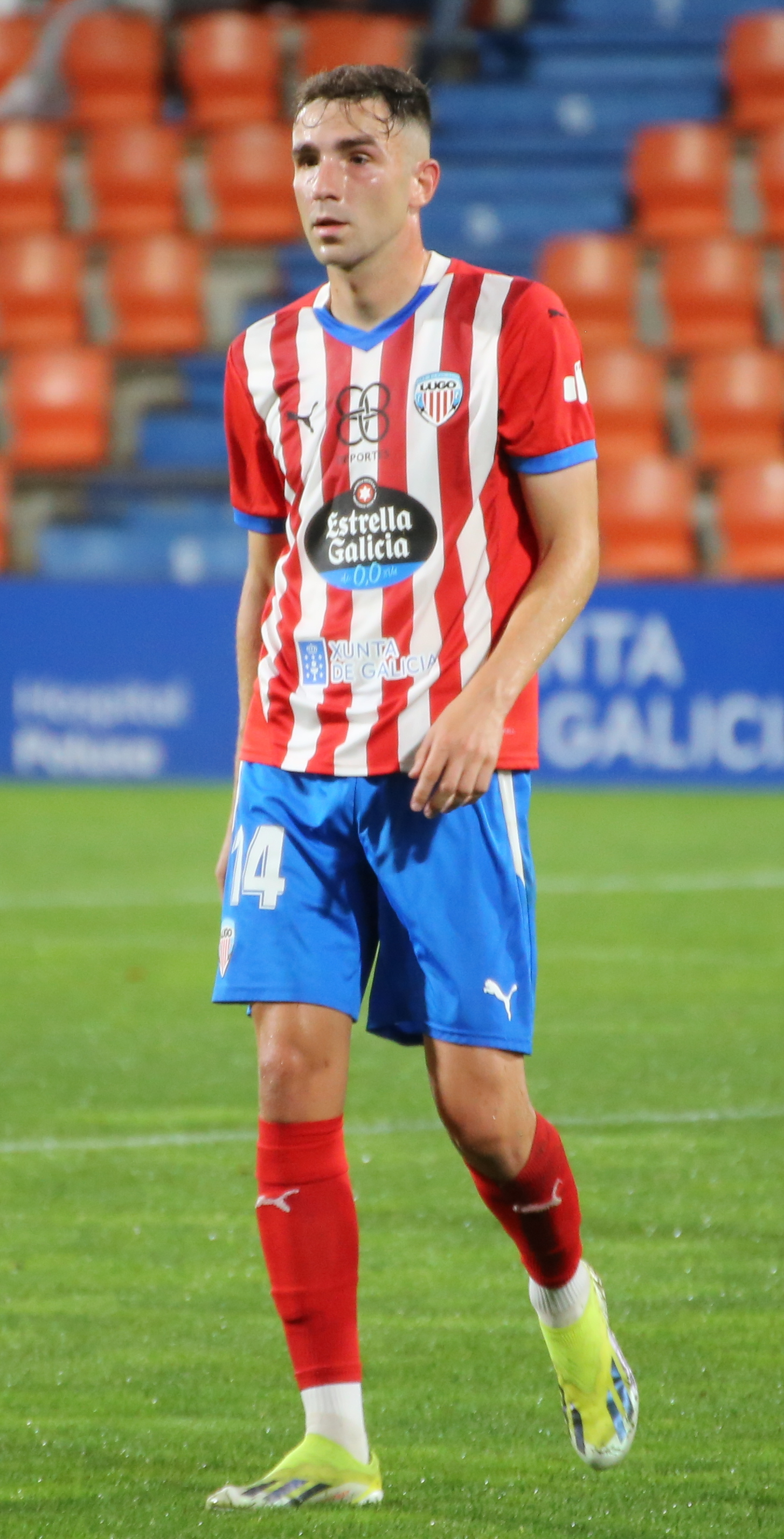
- Vidal with Lugo in 2024

Personal information
- Full name: Daniel Vidal Martínez
- Date of birth: 16 May 2000 (age 26)
- Place of birth: Portomarín, Spain
- Height: 1.83 m (6 ft 0 in)
- Position: Midfielder

Team information
- Current team: Rayo Majadahonda
- Number: 6

Youth career
- Lugo

Senior career*
Years	Team	Apps	(Gls)
2019–2023	Polvorín	57	(2)
2020–2023	Lugo	4	(0)
2022	→ Coruxo (loan)	18	(0)
2023–2024	Coruxo	31	(1)
2024–2025	Lugo	28	(0)
2025–	Rayo Majadahonda	30	(0)
- * Club domestic league appearances and goals as of 16 May 2026

Daniel "Dani" Vidal Martínez (born 16 May 2000) is a Spanish footballer who plays as a central midfielder for Segunda Federación club Rayo Majadahonda.

== Club career ==
Vidal was born in Portomarín, Lugo, Galicia, and finished his formation with CD Lugo. Promoted to the reserves ahead of the 2019–20 campaign, he made his senior debut on 25 August 2019 by starting in a 0–1 Tercera División away loss against Arosa SC.

Vidal made his first team debut on 13 September 2020, coming on as a second-half substitute for Manu Barreiro in a 0–2 away loss against CF Fuenlabrada in the Segunda División championship. On 5 January 2022, he was loaned to Segunda División RFEF side Coruxo FC for the remainder of the season.
