= UD Santa Mariña =

Santa Mariña
- Full name: Unión Deportiva Santa Mariña
- Founded: 1947
- Ground: Cotogrande
- Chairman: Manuel Pena Pornomeñe
- League: Segunda Futgal – Vigo
- 2024–25: Primera Futgal – Group 6, 17th of 18 (relegated)
Home colours	Away colours

Unión Deportiva Santa Mariña is a Spanish football club based in Cabral, a parish of Vigo in the autonomous community of Galicia. Founded in 1947, they play in Segunda Futgal – Vigo.

Home matches are held at Instalaciones Deportivas de Cotogrande, and team colours are red shirt, blue shorts and red socks.

== History ==
Santa Mariña was founded in 1942 as C.D. Cabral, changing its name five years later to Unión Deportiva Santa Mariña de Cabral. Over the years the club focused in youth development, and as such did not have a proper senior team, but various youth sides competing in separate divisions according to their age groups. It currently has an amateur senior side that competes in the regional lower leagues.

== Season to season ==
Season	Tier	Division	Place	Copa del Rey
1982–83	8	3ª Reg.	3rd	
1983–84	8	3ª Reg.	5th	
1984–85	8	3ª Reg.	1st	
1985–86	7	2ª Reg.	14th	
1986–87	7	2ª Reg.	8th	
1987–88	7	2ª Reg.	2nd	
1988–89	6	1ª Reg.	16th	
1989–90	6	1ª Reg.	6th	
1990–91	6	1ª Reg.	9th	
1991–92	6	1ª Reg.	13th	
1992–93	6	1ª Reg.	19th	
1993–94	7	2ª Reg.	15th	
1994–95	7	2ª Reg.	15th	
1995–96	7	2ª Reg.	11th	
1996–97	7	2ª Reg.	11th	
1997–98	7	2ª Reg.	8th	
1998–99	7	2ª Reg.	6th	
1999–2000	7	2ª Reg.	8th	
2000–01	7	2ª Reg.	13th	
2001–02	7	2ª Reg.	17th	

Season	Tier	Division	Place	Copa del Rey
2002–03	8	3ª Reg.	1st	
2003–04	7	2ª Reg.	10th	
2004–05	7	2ª Reg.	17th	
2005–06	8	3ª Reg.	9th	
2006–07	8	3ª Aut.	2nd	
2007–08	8	3ª Aut.	14th	
2008–09	8	3ª Aut.	3rd	
2009–10	8	3ª Aut.	4th	
2010–11	8	3ª Aut.	13th	
2011–12	8	3ª Aut.	3rd	
2012–13	7	2ª Aut.	2nd	
2013–14	7	2ª Aut.	4th	
2014–15	7	2ª Aut.	6th	
2015–16	7	2ª Aut.	8th	
2016–17	7	2ª Gal.	1st	
2017–18	6	1ª Gal.	13th	
2018–19	7	2ª Gal.	2nd	
2019–20	6	1ª Gal.	12th	
2020–21	DNP			
2021–22	7	1ª Gal.	7th	

Season	Tier	Division	Place	Copa del Rey
2022–23	8	2ª Gal.	2nd	
2023–24	7	1ª Gal.	14th	
2024–25	7	1ª Futgal	17th	
2025–26	8	2ª Futgal		

== Notable former players ==
- Santiago Formoso
- Jonathan Pereira
- Iago Aspas
- Brais Méndez
- Rubén Blanco
- Yelko Pino
- Gabri Veiga
