= SD Fisterra =

Association football club in Spain

Fisterra
- Full name: Sociedad Deportiva Fisterra
- Founded: 6 September 1960; 65 years ago
- Ground: Ara Solís, Fisterra, Galicia, Spain
- Capacity: 200
- President: Sergio Insua Ruibo
- Manager: Fran Pequeño
- League: Primera Futgal – Group 2
- 2024–25: Primera Futgal – Group 2, 6th of 17
Home colours	Away colours

Sociedad Deportiva Fisterra is a Spanish football team located in Fisterra, in the province of A Coruña, in the autonomous community of Galicia. Founded in 1960, they play in Primera Futgal – Group 2, holding home matches at Campo Municipal de Fútbol Ara Solis, with a capacity of 200 spectators.

== History ==
Founded on 6 September 1960 under the name of Sociedad Deportiva Finisterre, the club was one of the eight founding members of the Liga da Costa in the 1963–64 season. In 1980, they achieved a first-ever promotion to Tercera División, but suffered relegation two seasons later.

In 1997, Finisterre was renamed Sociedad Deportiva Fisterra. In May 2020, the club returned to the fourth division.

== Season to season ==
Season	Tier	Division	Place	Copa del Rey
1963–64	5	1ª Reg.	2nd	
1964–65	5	1ª Reg.	2nd	
1965–66	5	1ª Reg.	2nd	
1966–67	5	1ª Reg.	(R)	
1967–68	5	1ª Reg.	3rd	
1968–69	5	1ª Reg.	3rd	
1969–70	DNP			
1970–71	5	1ª Reg.	7th	
1971–72	5	1ª Reg.	10th	
1972–73	DNP			
1973–74	DNP			
1974–75	5	2ª Reg.	11th	
1975–76	5	2ª Reg.	4th	
1976–77	5	2ª Reg.	1st	
1977–78	5	Serie A	18th	
1978–79	6	1ª Reg.	4th	
1979–80	5	Reg. Pref.	10th	
1980–81	4	3ª	13th	
1981–82	4	3ª	19th	
1982–83	5	Reg. Pref.	11th	

Season	Tier	Division	Place	Copa del Rey
1983–84	5	Reg. Pref.	11th	
1984–85	5	Reg. Pref.	17th	
1985–86	5	Reg. Pref.	14th	
1986–87	5	Reg. Pref.	17th	
1987–88	5	Reg. Pref.	20th	
1988–89	6	1ª Reg.	5th	
1989–90	6	1ª Reg.	4th	
1990–91	6	1ª Reg.	7th	
1991–92	7	2ª Reg.	9th	
1992–93	7	2ª Reg.	1st	
1993–94	6	1ª Reg.	5th	
1994–95	6	1ª Reg.	14th	
1995–96	6	1ª Reg.	12th	
1996–97	6	1ª Reg.	10th	
1997–98	6	1ª Reg.	15th	
1998–99	6	1ª Reg.	17th	
1999–2000	6	1ª Reg.	20th	
2000–01	7	2ª Reg.	6th	
2001–02	7	2ª Reg.	1st	
2002–03	6	1ª Reg.	16th	

Season	Tier	Division	Place	Copa del Rey
2003–04	7	2ª Reg.	11th	
2004–05	7	2ª Reg.	6th	
2005–06	7	2ª Reg.	5th	
2006–07	7	2ª Aut.	5th	
2007–08	7	2ª Aut.	4th	
2008–09	7	2ª Aut.	13th	
2009–10	7	2ª Aut.	8th	
2010–11	7	2ª Aut.	10th	
2011–12	7	2ª Aut.	4th	
2012–13	6	1ª Aut.	16th	
2013–14	7	2ª Aut.	5th	
2014–15	7	2ª Aut.	7th	
2015–16	7	2ª Aut.	1st	
2016–17	6	1ª Gal.	10th	
2017–18	6	1ª Gal.	15th	
2018–19	6	1ª Gal.	1st	
2019–20	5	Pref.	2nd	
2020–21	4	3ª	11th / 8th	
2021–22	6	Pref.	4th	
2022–23	6	Pref.	19th	

Season	Tier	Division	Place	Copa del Rey
2023–24	7	1ª Gal.	8th	
2024–25	7	1ª Futgal	6th	
2025–26	7	1ª Futgal	17th	
2026–27	8	2ª Futgal		

- 3 seasons in Tercera División
