= Moctar Sidi El Hacen =

Mauritanian footballer

Hacen
Personal information
- Full name: Moctar Sidi El Hacen El Ide
- Date of birth: 31 December 1997 (age 28)
- Place of birth: Arafat, Nouakchott-Sud, Mauritania
- Height: 1.81 m (5 ft 11 in)
- Position: Midfielder

Team information
- Current team: Difaâ El Jadidi

Youth career
- ASAC Concorde
- 2014–2016: Levante

Senior career*
| Years | Team | Apps | (Gls) |
| 2012–2014 | ASAC Concorde | | |
| 2016–2018 | Levante B | 31 | (2) |
| 2017–2018 | Levante | 2 | (0) |
| 2018–2020 | Valladolid B | 31 | (1) |
| 2018–2022 | Valladolid | 1 | (0) |
| 2020–2021 | → Lugo (loan) | 38 | (6) |
| 2022–2023 | Lugo | 32 | (0) |
| 2023–2024 | Mesaimeer | | |
| 2024–2025 | Nouadhibou | | |
| 2025- | Difaâ El Jadidi | | |

International career^{‡}
| 2016 | Mauritania U20 | | |
| 2013– | Mauritania | 58 | (8) |
- * Club domestic league appearances and goals as of 27 May 2023 ‡ National team caps and goals as of 25 November 2025

Moctar Sidi El Hacen El Ide (Arabic: مختار سيدي الحسن العيد; born 31 December 1997), commonly known as Hacen, is a Mauritanian professional footballer who plays as a central midfielder for Nouadhibou and the Mauritania national team.

== Club career ==
Born in Arafat in the outskirts of Nouakchott, Hacen started off at local ASAC Concorde and nearly moved to Valencia CF in August 2014 after impressing in the year's L'Alcúdia International Football Tournament, but chose to join Levante UD instead. However, he was unable to play any official matches until his 18th birthday.

Assigned to the club's Juvenil squad, Hacen made his debut with the reserves on 14 January 2016, coming on as a first half substitute in a 1–3 Segunda División B away loss against CD Llosetense. He was definitely promoted to the B-side ahead of the 2016–17 campaign, and scored his first senior goal on 6 November to open a 2–0 home win over UE Llagostera.

Hacen made his first team debut on 28 November 2017, starting in a 1–1 home draw against Girona FC, for the season's Copa del Rey. His La Liga debut occurred three days later, replacing Samu García in a 0–0 away draw against Málaga CF.

On 24 July 2018, Hacen signed a two-year deal with another reserve team, Real Valladolid B also in the third division. He made one two-minute substitute appearance for the first team in the top flight the following 23 April, a 1–0 win over Girona FC at the Estadio José Zorrilla.

On 31 January 2020, Hacen was loaned to Segunda División side CD Lugo for the remainder of the campaign. He scored his first professional goal on 16 February, netting the game's only in an away success over CF Fuenlabrada.

On 2 October 2020, Hacen rejoined Lugo on loan for the 2020–21 campaign. Upon returning, he suffered a knee injury in July 2021 while on international duty, and later terminated his contract with Valladolid the following 30 January.

On 26 August 2022, after roughly one year of inactivity and six months without a club, Hacen returned to Lugo on a permanent one-year contract.

== International career ==
Hacen started very early with his international career, having played seven games with the senior national team before the age of 16; his first being on 2 March 2013 by starting in a 0–0 away friendly draw against the Gambia. On 5 January 2014, he scored his first ever senior international goal in a 3–2 friendly win against Mozambique. On 10 January 2014, he was named in Mauritania's 23-man squad for the 2014 African Nations Championship.

Later in 2016, he was part of the Mauritania U20s who participated in the 2016 COTIF Tournament. He also participated in the 2017 Africa U-20 Cup of Nations qualification, where he helped Mauritania reach the second round after defeating Algeria 3–2 on aggregate, scoring two goals in the process.

On 21 May 2019, he was named in Mauritania's 23-man squad for the 2019 Africa Cup of Nations in Egypt. On 24 June 2019, he scored from the penalty spot in his sides 4–1 opening match defeat against Mali, thus scoring Mauritania's first ever goal in the tournament.

== Career statistics ==
=== Club ===
As of match played 24 August 2021

Appearances and goals by club, season and competition
| Club | Season | League | | | National Cup | | Continental | | Total | |
| Club | Season | Division | Apps | Goals | Apps | Goals | Apps | Goals | Apps | Goals |
|---|---|---|---|---|---|---|---|---|---|---|
| Levante B | 2015–16 | Segunda División B | 1 | 0 | — | | — | | 1 | 0 |
| Levante B | 2016–17 | Segunda División B | 31 | 2 | — | | — | | 31 | 2 |
| Levante B | Total | | 32 | 2 | 0 | 0 | 0 | 0 | 32 | 2 |
| Levante | 2017–18 | La Liga | 2 | 0 | 1 | 0 | — | | 3 | 0 |
| Valladolid B | 2018–19 | Segunda División B | 22 | 1 | — | | — | | 22 | 1 |
| Valladolid B | 2019–20 | Segunda División B | 9 | 0 | — | | — | | 9 | 0 |
| Valladolid B | Total | | 31 | 1 | 0 | 0 | 0 | 0 | 31 | 1 |
| Valladolid | 2018–19 | La Liga | 1 | 0 | 0 | 0 | — | | 1 | 0 |
| Valladolid | 2019–20 | La Liga | 0 | 0 | 2 | 0 | — | | 2 | 0 |
| Valladolid | Total | | 1 | 0 | 2 | 0 | 0 | 0 | 3 | 0 |
| Lugo (loan) | 2019–20 | Segunda División | 14 | 5 | 0 | 0 | — | | 14 | 5 |
| Lugo (loan) | 2020–21 | Segunda División | 24 | 1 | 2 | 2 | — | | 26 | 3 |
| Lugo (loan) | Total | | 38 | 6 | 2 | 2 | 0 | 0 | 40 | 8 |
| Career total | | | 104 | 9 | 5 | 2 | 0 | 0 | 109 | 11 |

=== International ===
As of 9 October 2021

| National team | Year | Apps | Goals |
|---|---|---|---|
| Mauritania | 2013 | 5 | 0 |
| Mauritania | 2014 | 11 | 0 |
| Mauritania | 2016 | 5 | 0 |
| Mauritania | 2017 | 4 | 3 |
| Mauritania | 2018 | 5 | 2 |
| Mauritania | 2019 | 10 | 3 |
| Mauritania | 2020 | 3 | 0 |
| Mauritania | 2021 | 3 | 0 |
| Total | | 46 | 8 |

=== International goals ===
Scores and results list Mauritania's goal tally first.

| No | Date | Venue | Opponent | Score | Result | Competition |
|---|---|---|---|---|---|---|
| 1. | 7 January 2017 | Stade Mustapha Tchaker, Blida, Algeria | Algeria | 1–0 | 1–3 | Friendly |
| 2. | 27 March 2017 | Stade Olympique, Nouakchott, Mauritania | Congo | 1–1 | 2–1 | Friendly |
| 3. | 27 March 2017 | Stade Olympique, Nouakchott, Mauritania | Congo | 2–1 | 2–1 | Friendly |
| 4. | 24 March 2018 | Stade Cheikha Ould Boïdiya, Nouakchott, Mauritania | Guinea | 1–0 | 2–0 | Friendly |
| 5. | 12 October 2018 | Estádio 11 de Novembro, Luanda, Angola | Angola | 1–0 | 1–4 | 2019 Africa Cup of Nations qualification |
| 6. | 17 June 2019 | Marrakesh Stadium, Marrakesh, Morocco | Benin | 1–1 | 1–3 | Friendly |
| 7. | 23 June 2019 | Suez Stadium, Suez, Egypt | Mali | 1–3 | 1–4 | 2019 Africa Cup of Nations |
| 8. | 19 November 2019 | Stade Cheikha Ould Boïdiya, Nouakchott, Mauritania | Central African Republic | 1–0 | 2–0 | 2021 Africa Cup of Nations qualification |
