= Luis Castro (footballer, born 2002) =

Spanish footballer

Personal information
- Full name: Luis Castro Lois
- Date of birth: 6 April 2002 (age 24)
- Place of birth: Ribadumia, Spain
- Height: 1.73 m (5 ft 8 in)
- Position: Left back

Team information
- Current team: Arosa

Youth career
- Arousa
- 2017–2019: Pontevedra
- 2019–2021: Lugo

Senior career*
Years	Team	Apps	(Gls)
2020–2023	Lugo	1	(0)
2021–2023	Polvorín	49	(1)
2023–2024	Villalbés	15	(0)
2024–	Arosa	6	(1)
- * Club domestic league appearances and goals as of 13 October 2024

Luis Castro Lois (born 6 April 2002) is a Spanish footballer who plays for Arosa as a left back.

== Club career ==
Born in Ribadumia, Pontevedra, Galicia, Castro represented ED Arousa SD and Pontevedra CF before joining CD Lugo's youth setup in 2019. On 30 December 2020, before even having appeared for the reserves, he made his first team debut by starting in a 2–1 away win against CA Pulpileño, for the season's Copa del Rey.

Castro made his professional debut on 7 January 2021, coming on as a second-half substitute for Gerard Valentín in a 1–2 away loss against Girona FC, also for the national cup. He made his Segunda División debut on 1 April, replacing Hugo Rama late into a 1–6 away loss against UD Las Palmas.
