= Jesús Fernández (footballer, born 2000) =

Spanish footballer

Personal information
- Full name: Jesús Fernández Alonso
- Date of birth: 1 March 2000 (age 26)
- Place of birth: Navia, Spain
- Height: 1.85 m (6 ft 1 in)
- Positions: Centre back; midfielder

Youth career
- Sporting Gijón
- Lugo

Senior career*
Years	Team	Apps	(Gls)
2019–2022	Polvorín	87	(3)
2022–2023	Lugo	8	(0)
2023–2024	Ponferradina	6	(0)
2024	→ Sabadell (loan)	2	(0)
- * Club domestic league appearances and goals as of 20 March 2024

Jesús Fernández Alonso (born 1 March 2000) is a Spanish footballer who plays as either a central defender or a central midfielder.

== Club career ==
Fernández was born in Anleo, Navia, Asturias, and represented Sporting de Gijón and CD Lugo as a youth. He made his senior debut with the farm team on 25 August 2019, starting in a 1–0 Tercera División away loss against Arosa SC.

Fernández scored his first senior goal on 5 December 2020, netting the opener in a 4–1 away routing of Deportivo Fabril. The following 2 July, he renewed his contract for two years.

Fernández made his first team debut on 27 August 2022, starting in a 1–0 home win over CD Leganés in the Segunda División.
