= Pablo Clavería =

Spanish footballer (born 1996)

Personal information
- Full name: Pablo Clavería Herráiz
- Date of birth: 1 April 1996 (age 30)
- Place of birth: Madrid, Spain
- Height: 1.75 m (5 ft 9 in)
- Position: Midfielder

Team information
- Current team: Anagennisi Karditsa
- Number: 4

Youth career
- Getafe
- 2010–2015: Rayo Vallecano

Senior career*
Years	Team	Apps	(Gls)
2014–2017	Rayo Vallecano B	52	(17)
2014–2017	Rayo Vallecano	9	(0)
2017–2018	Málaga B	27	(4)
2018–2020	Fuenlabrada	64	(2)
2020–2022	Cartagena	37	(0)
2022–2023	Lugo	49	(1)
2023–2024	Ponferradina	33	(1)
2024–2026	Zamora	45	(3)
2026–	Anagennisi Karditsa	3	(0)
- * Club domestic league appearances and goals as of 20 April 2026

Pablo Clavería Herráiz (born 1 April 1996) is a Spanish footballer who plays as a central midfielder for Super League Greece 2 club Anagennisi Karditsa.

== Club career ==
Born in Madrid, Clavería joined Rayo Vallecano's youth setup in 2010 at the age of 14, after starting out at neighbouring Getafe CF. On 12 December 2014, even before having appeared with the reserves, he was called up by Paco Jémez to a La Liga match against Valencia CF; one day later, he came on as a late substitute for Raúl Baena in the 0–3 loss at the Mestalla Stadium.

Clavería subsequently resumed his spell with the B-side, appearing in both Segunda División B and Tercera División. On 14 August 2017, he signed for another reserve team, Atlético Malagueño also in the fourth division.

On 13 August 2018, Clavería signed a one-year deal with CF Fuenlabrada in the third division. The following 23 June, after helping in the team's first-ever promotion to the second division, he renewed his contract for a further year.

On 26 August 2020, Clavería signed a two-year deal with second division newcomers FC Cartagena. On 28 January 2022, he terminated his contract with the club, and moved to fellow league team CD Lugo on a two-and-a-half-year contract three days later.

On 5 September 2023, Clavería signed with Primera Federación club Ponferradina.

On 30 July 2024, Clavería moved to Zamora, also in Primera Federación.

On 10 February 2026, he joined Anagennisi Karditsa of Super League Greece 2.
