= Juanpe (footballer, born 1996) =

Spanish footballer

Personal information
- Full name: Juan Pedro Jiménez Melero
- Date of birth: 31 March 1996 (age 30)
- Place of birth: Jerez de la Frontera, Spain
- Height: 1.83 m (6 ft 0 in)
- Position: Central midfielder

Team information
- Current team: Gamba Osaka
- Number: 78

Youth career
- 2018–2016: Cádiz

Senior career*
Years	Team	Apps	(Gls)
2014–2018	Cádiz B	85	(13)
2016–2018	Cádiz	1	(0)
2017	→ Mancha Real (loan)	4	(0)
2018	Sevilla C	2	(0)
2018–2020	Sevilla B	54	(2)
2020–2023	Lugo	87	(5)
2023–2026	Málaga	58	(0)
2026–	Gamba Osaka	0	(0)
- * Club domestic league appearances and goals as of 11:05, 12 October 2026 (UTC)

Juan Pedro Jiménez Melero (born 31 March 1996), commonly known as Juanpe, is a Spanish footballer who plays as a central midfielder for J1 League club Gamba Osaka.

== Club career ==
=== Cádiz ===
Born in Jerez de la Frontera, Andalusia, Juanpe was a Cádiz CF youth graduate. On 2 December 2014, he renewed his contract for five seasons, and made his senior debut for the reserves late in the month by coming on as a late substitute in a 2–0 Tercera División home win against CD Mairena.

On 13 January 2016, Juanpe was an unused substitute in a 0–2 Copa del Rey away loss against Celta de Vigo. On 19 August he made his professional debut, replacing Abel Gómez in a 1–1 away draw against UD Almería.

On 1 January 2017, Juanpe was loaned to Segunda División B side Atlético Mancha Real, until June.

=== Sevilla ===
In August 2018, Juanpe joined Sevilla FC; initially assigned to the C-team in the fourth tier, he was promoted to the reserves in September. On 5 November 2018, he renewed his contract until 2020, being a regular starter afterwards.

On 11 October 2019, Juanpe further extended his contract with Sevilla until 2021.

=== Lugo ===
On 12 August 2020, free agent Juanpe signed a three-year contract with CD Lugo in the second division. He scored his first professional goal on 29 October, netting a last-minute equalizer in a 1–1 draw at CD Tenerife.

=== Málaga ===
On 21 June 2023, after Lugo's relegation, Juanpe joined Málaga CF, also relegated to Primera Federación, on a three-year contract. Mainly a backup option, he was a part of the squad which achieved two promotions in three years, but departed the club on 23 August 2026.

=== Gamba Osaka ===
In August 2026, it was announced that Juanpe would be joining J1 League club Gamba Osaka.
