= Jaume Cuéllar =

Bolivian footballer (born 2001)

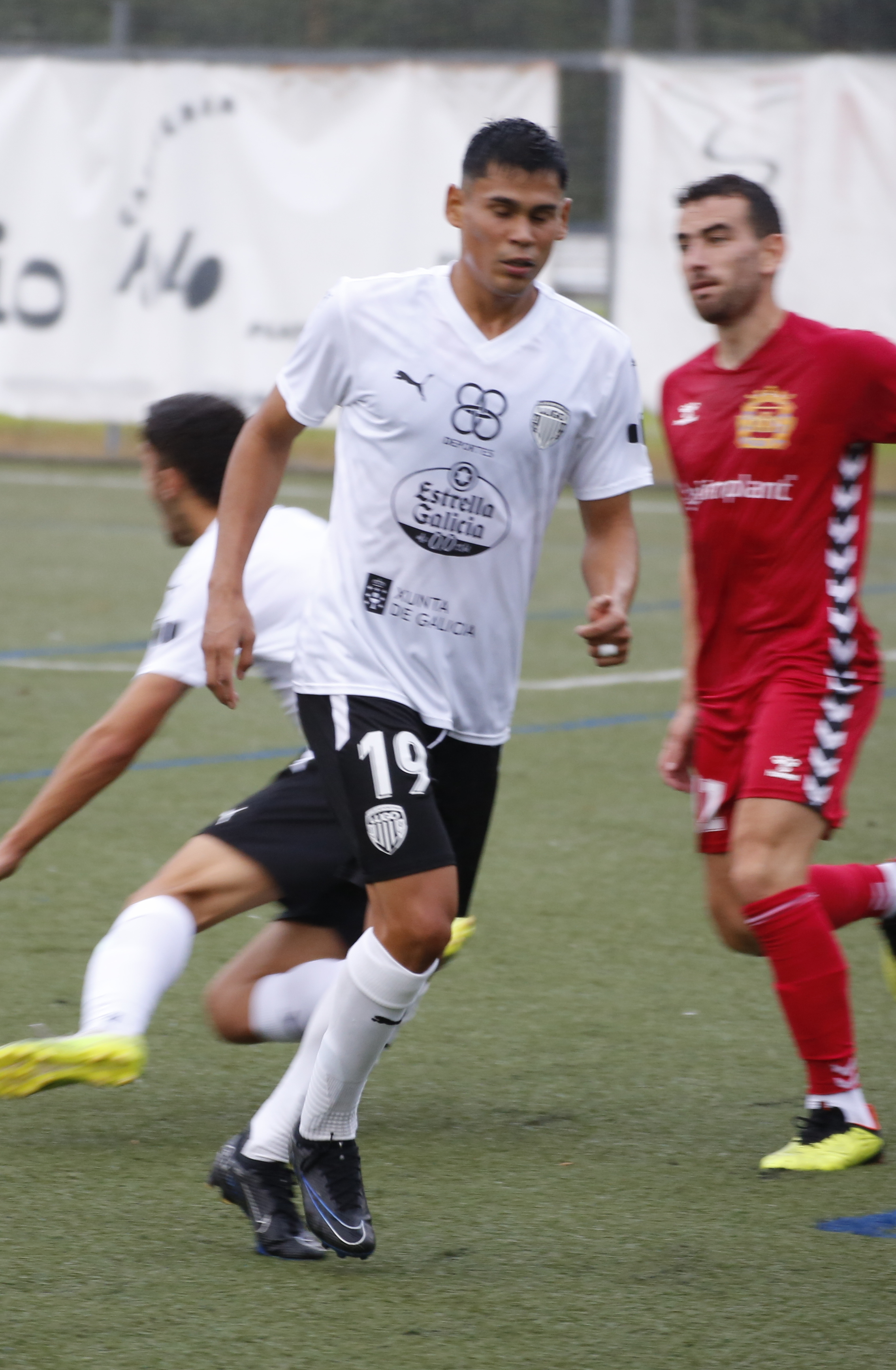
- Cuéllar with Lugo in 2024

Personal information
- Full name: Jaume Albert Cuéllar Mendoza
- Date of birth: 23 August 2001 (age 25)
- Place of birth: Granollers, Spain
- Height: 1.80 m (5 ft 11 in)
- Positions: Winger; forward

Team information
- Current team: Visakha
- Number: 28

Youth career
- Poniente
- Racing Blanenc
- 2015–2017: Barcelona
- 2017–2020: S.P.A.L.

Senior career*
| Years | Team | Apps | (Gls) |
| 2019–2021 | S.P.A.L. | 2 | (0) |
| 2021–2025 | Lugo | 87 | (4) |
| 2023–2024 | → Barcelona B (loan) | 27 | (1) |
| 2025–2026 | Arenteiro | 40 | (2) |
| 2026– | Visakha | 6 | (2) |

International career^{‡}
| 2017–2019 | Bolivia U17 | 3 | (0) |
| 2021– | Bolivia | 10 | (0) |
- * Club domestic league appearances and goals as of 1 November 2026 ‡ National team caps and goals as of 23:20, 26 March 2026 (UTC)

Jaume Albert Cuéllar Mendoza (born 23 August 2001) is a professional footballer who plays as either a winger or a forward for Spanish club Arenteiro. Born in Spain, he plays for the Bolivia national team.

== Club career ==
=== Early career ===
Born in Granollers, Barcelona, Catalonia, to Bolivian parents, Cuéllar joined FC Barcelona's La Masia in June 2015, from FC Racing Blanenc. In 2017, he moved abroad and joined Italian side S.P.A.L.

=== S.P.A.L. ===
After appearing for the under-17s and the Primavera squads, Cuéllar made his first team debut for the Biancazzurri on 4 December 2019, coming on as a late substitute for Sergio Floccari in a 5–1 Coppa Italia home routing of Lecce. He made his Serie A debut the following 22 July, replacing Espeto late into a 1–6 home loss to Roma.

On 3 August 2021, Cuéllar announced his departure from SPAL through his Facebook account.

=== Lugo ===
On 4 August 2021, Cuéllar returned to Spain after agreeing to a two-year deal with Segunda División side CD Lugo.

==== Loan to Barcelona ====
On 26 August 2023, he returned to Barcelona to play for its reserve Barcelona B team on a loan spell for a year, making history as the first Bolivian to play for any Barcelona team.

== International career ==
Cuéllar represented Bolivia at under-17 level in 2017, and received his first call-up to the full side on 4 October 2020. The following 10 June, he was included in César Farías' 27-man squad for the 2021 Copa América.

Cuéllar made his full international debut during the competition, starting against Paraguay. However, his debut didn't go to plan, as he was sent off, and Bolivia lost the match 3–1.

== Career statistics ==
=== Club ===
As of match played 14 March 2026

| Club | Season | League | | | Cup (Note: Includes Coppa Italia, Copa del Rey) | | Other | | Total | |
| Club | Season | Division | Apps | Goals | Apps | Goals | Apps | Goals | Apps | Goals |
|---|---|---|---|---|---|---|---|---|---|---|
| S.P.A.L. | 2019–20 | Serie A | 2 | 0 | 1 | 0 | 0 | 0 | 3 | 0 |
| S.P.A.L. | 2020–21 | Serie B | 0 | 0 | 0 | 0 | 0 | 0 | 0 | 0 |
| S.P.A.L. | Total | | 2 | 0 | 1 | 0 | 0 | 0 | 3 | 0 |
| Lugo | 2021–22 | Segunda División | 34 | 2 | 1 | 0 | 0 | 0 | 35 | 2 |
| Lugo | 2022–23 | Segunda División | 38 | 2 | 0 | 0 | 0 | 0 | 38 | 2 |
| Lugo | 2024–25 | Primera Federación | 12 | 0 | 2 | 0 | — | | 14 | 0 |
| Lugo | Total | | 84 | 4 | 3 | 0 | 0 | 0 | 87 | 4 |
| Barcelona B (loan) | 2022–23 | Primera Federación | 27 | 1 | 0 | 0 | 0 | 0 | 27 | 1 |
| Arenteiro | 2024–25 | Primera Federación | 16 | 2 | — | | — | | 16 | 2 |
| Arenteiro | 2025–26 | Primera Federación | 18 | 0 | — | | — | | 18 | 0 |
| Arenteiro | Total | | 34 | 2 | — | | — | | 34 | 2 |
| Career total | | | 147 | 7 | 4 | 0 | 0 | 0 | 151 | 7 |

=== International ===
As of matches played 26 March 2026

Appearances and goals by national team and year
| National team | Year | Apps | Goals |
|---|---|---|---|
| Bolivia | 2021 | 1 | 0 |
| Bolivia | 2022 | 2 | 0 |
| Bolivia | 2023 | 2 | 0 |
| Bolivia | 2024 | 4 | 0 |
| Bolivia | 2026 | 1 | 0 |
| Total | | 10 | 0 |
