= Chiqui =

Spanish footballer

Personal information
- Full name: Óscar Castellano Zamora
- Date of birth: 7 October 1997 (age 29)
- Place of birth: Mérida, Spain
- Height: 1.80 m (5 ft 11 in)
- Position: Winger

Team information
- Current team: Mérida
- Number: 7

Youth career
- 2002–2009: Atlético Villacarlos
- 2009–2010: Mallorca
- 2010–2016: Santa Mariña

Senior career*
| Years | Team | Apps | (Gls) |
| 2016 | Santa Mariña | | |
| 2016–2017 | Erizana | 26 | (8) |
| 2017–2018 | Choco | 35 | (5) |
| 2018–2019 | Arosa | 36 | (4) |
| 2019–2020 | Polvorín | 26 | (3) |
| 2019–2021 | Lugo | 4 | (0) |
| 2020–2021 | → Marino (loan) | 21 | (1) |
| 2021–2023 | Coruxo | 67 | (15) |
| 2023–2025 | Pontevedra | 60 | (8) |
| 2025– | Mérida | 36 | (1) |
- * Club domestic league appearances and goals as of 9 June 2026

Óscar Castellano Zamora (born 7 October 1997), commonly known as Chiqui, is a Spanish professional footballer who plays as a winger for Primera Federación club Mérida.

== Club career ==
Born in Mérida, Badajoz, Extremadura, Chiqui moved to Salceda de Caselas, Pontevedra, Galicia at the age of 13 and finished his formation with UD Santa Mariña. After making his first team debut during the 2015–16 season, in the regional leagues, he subsequently represented Erizana CF.

Ahead of the 2017–18 campaign, Chiqui signed for Tercera División side CD Choco. On 21 June 2018, he moved to fellow league team Arosa SC, being a regular starter before joining CD Lugo on 18 July of the following year, being initially assigned to the farm team also in division four.

Chiqui made his professional debut on 8 December 2019, coming on as a late substitute for Tete Morente in a 1–3 away loss against Girona FC in the Segunda División championship. The following 17 September, he moved to Segunda División B side Marino de Luanco on loan for the 2020–21 season.
