= Fernando Seoane =

Spanish footballer

Personal information
- Full name: Fernando Seoane Antelo
- Date of birth: 25 March 1983 (age 43)
- Place of birth: Compostela, Spain
- Height: 1.76 m (5 ft 9 in)
- Position: Defensive midfielder

Youth career
- Compostela

Senior career*
Years	Team	Apps	(Gls)
2002–2003	Compostela B		
2003–2004	Compostela	30	(0)
2004–2006	Alavés B	61	(4)
2006–2007	Burgos	37	(1)
2007–2009	Écija	71	(0)
2009–2010	Lugo	35	(0)
2010–2012	Gimnàstic	75	(0)
2012–2022	Lugo	351	(7)
Total		660	(12)
- * Club domestic league appearances and goals

Fernando Seoane Antelo (born 25 March 1983) is a Spanish former professional footballer who played as a defensive midfielder.

He achieved Segunda División figures of 426 games and seven goals over 12 seasons, spending one decade with Lugo.

== Club career ==
Born in Santiago de Compostela, Galicia, Seoane started playing with hometown's SD Compostela, remaining two years with the club. In 2004 he joined Deportivo Alavés' reserves, spending two further seasons with them in the Segunda División B.

Subsequently, Seoane continued playing in the third tier, representing Burgos CF, Écija Balompié and CD Lugo. In the 2010–11 campaign, aged 27, he made his Segunda División debut with Catalonia's Gimnàstic de Tarragona, only missing four league matches (37 starts, 3,178 minutes) as the team narrowly avoided relegation.

Seoane returned to Lugo in July 2012, on a three-year contract. He scored his first goal as a professional on 1 September 2013, in a 4–2 home win against Real Jaén. During his spell at the Estadio Anxo Carro he was an essential midfield unit for several coaches, and on 19 October 2017 the 34-year-old agreed to an extension until 2020.

On 23 May 2022, Lugo announced the departure of 39-year-old Seoane at the end of the season, after ten years of service.
