= CD Lugo B =

Spanish football club

Coordinates: 43.002198°N 7.548784°W

Lugo B
- Full name: Club Deportivo Lugo "B"
- Nickname: Polvorín
- Founded: 1991 (as SDC Polvorín)
- Dissolved: 2026
- Ground: Anxo Carro, Lugo, Galicia, Spain
- Capacity: 7,114
- President: Constantino Saqués
- Head coach: Roberto Trashorras
- 2025–26: Tercera Federación – Group 1, 9th of 18
Home colours	Away colours	Third colours

Club Deportivo Lugo "B", previously Polvorín Fútbol Club and Sociedad Deportiva e Cultural Polvorín, was a Spanish football team based in Lugo, in the autonomous community of Galicia. Founded in 1991, it last played in Tercera Federación – Group 1, holding home matches at Campo Municipal de A Cheda with a capacity of 1,000 seats.

== History ==
Polvorín FC club logo

Founded in 1991 as Sociedad Deportiva y Cultural Polvorín, the club was created to honour CD Polvorín, a club from the city which played in two Tercera División seasons before merging with SG Lucense in 1953 to form CD Lugo. The club established some youth categories in 1992, before starting a senior team in 1993.

On 13 August 2015, Polvorín became the farm team of Lugo. In 2018, SDC Polvorín was renamed Polvorín Fútbol Club.

In July 2025, the club was fully incorporated into Lugo's structure, being renamed Lugo B and becoming their reserve team. Roughly one year later, however, the club decided to close their B-team.

== Season to season ==
- As an independent club

Season	Tier	Division	Place	Copa del Rey
1993–94	7	2ª Reg.	10th	
1994–95	7	2ª Reg.	1st	
1995–96	6	1ª Reg.	17th	
1996–97	7	2ª Reg.	7th	
1997–98	7	2ª Reg.	7th	
1998–99	7	2ª Reg.	2nd	
1999–2000	6	1ª Reg.	11th	
2000–01	6	1ª Reg.	16th	
2001–02	7	2ª Reg.	8th	
2002–03	7	2ª Reg.	5th	
2003–04	7	2ª Reg.	1st	

Season	Tier	Division	Place	Copa del Rey
2004–05	7	2ª Reg.	2nd	
2005–06	6	1ª Reg.	6th	
2006–07	6	1ª Aut.	12th	
2007–08	6	1ª Aut.	9th	
2008–09	6	1ª Aut.	17th	
2009–10	7	2ª Aut.	4th	
2010–11	7	2ª Aut.	8th	
2011–12	7	2ª Aut.	1st	
2012–13	6	1ª Aut.	11th	
2013–14	6	1ª Aut.	16th	
2014–15	6	1ª Aut.	13th	

- As a reserve team

Season	Tier	Division	Place
2015–16	6	1ª Aut.	2nd
2016–17	5	Pref.	4th
2017–18	5	Pref.	1st
2018–19	4	3ª	10th
2019–20	4	3ª	11th
2020–21	4	3ª	2nd / 4th
2021–22	5	3ª RFEF	1st
2022–23	4	2ª Fed.	17th
2023–24	5	3ª Fed.	13th
2024–25	5	3ª Fed.	8th
2025–26	5	3ª Fed.	9th

- 1 season in Segunda Federación
- 3 seasons in Tercera División
- 4 seasons in Tercera Federación/Tercera División RFEF

== Current squad ==
As of 24 March 2023.

Note: Flags indicate national team as defined under FIFA eligibility rules; some limited exceptions apply. Players may hold more than one non-FIFA nationality.

No.	Pos.	Nation	Player
1	GK	ESP	Julen Fernández
2	DF	ESP	Pablo Expósito
3	DF	ESP	Luis Castro
4	DF	ESP	Andrés Castrín
5	MF	ESP	Dani Vidal
6	DF	ESP	Jesús Fernández
7	FW	ESP	Xabi Domínguez
8	MF	ESP	Alejandro Fidalgo (captain)
9	FW	PUR	Leandro Antonetti
10	MF	ESP	Álex Ramos
11	DF	ESP	Martín López
12	DF	ESP	Edu Taboada

No.	Pos.	Nation	Player
13	GK	ESP	Brais Vázquez
14	DF	ESP	Pablo Castrín
16	MF	ESP	David Rosón
17	DF	ESP	Carlos Torrado
18	FW	VEN	Ces Cotos
19	FW	ESP	Christian Martínez
20	DF	ESP	Iago Parga
21	FW	ESP	Iago Novo
22	FW	MTN	Idrissa Thiam
23	MF	ESP	Hugo García
26	GK	ESP	Víctor Arosa
27	FW	ESP	Pablo Rubal

=== From Youth Academy ===
Note: Flags indicate national team as defined under FIFA eligibility rules; some limited exceptions apply. Players may hold more than one non-FIFA nationality.

No.	Pos.	Nation	Player
28	DF	ESP	Alberto Freire
29	FW	ESP	Jorge González

== Notable players ==
- (Spain) Luis Díaz
