= Iriome González =

Spanish footballer

Iriome
Personal information
- Full name: Iriome González González
- Date of birth: 22 June 1987 (age 39)
- Place of birth: Icod de los Vinos, Spain
- Height: 1.85 m (6 ft 1 in)
- Position: Midfielder

Youth career
- 2003–2004: Icodense
- 2004–2005: Tenerife

Senior career*
Years	Team	Apps	(Gls)
2005–2007	Tenerife B	21	(5)
2007–2011	Tenerife	83	(10)
2009–2010	→ Huesca (loan)	26	(1)
2011–2013	Villarreal B	58	(3)
2013–2014	Mirandés	36	(2)
2014–2022	Lugo	244	(20)
Total		468	(41)

International career
2007	Spain U20	2	(0)
- * Club domestic league appearances and goals

Iriome González González (born 22 June 1987), known simply as Iriome, is a Spanish former professional footballer who played as a midfielder.

He amassed Segunda División totals of 416 matches and 34 goals over 15 seasons, mainly in service of Lugo (eight years) and Tenerife (four).

== Club career ==
Born in Icod de los Vinos, Santa Cruz de Tenerife, Canary Islands, Iriome was a product of CD Tenerife's youth system and made his first-team debut in 2006–07, in the Segunda División; aged 19, he managed to play 20 matches during the season and score four goals, his first appearance in the competition being on 14 January 2007 in a 0–0 away draw against UD Salamanca. His first goal came 14 days later, as he contributed to a 2–1 home win over UD Almería.

After featuring rarely in the 2008–09 campaign as the club returned to La Liga after seven years (only 12 appearances out of 42), Iriome signed with another side in the second tier, SD Huesca, on loan. He continued to compete in that league for several seasons, with Villarreal CF B, CD Mirandés and CD Lugo.

== International career ==
Iriome represented Spain at the 2007 FIFA U-20 World Cup.
