= Estadio Anxo Carro =

Football stadium in Lugo, Galicia, Spain

Coordinates: 43°00′12″N 7°34′15″W

Anxo Carro
- Anfield Carro
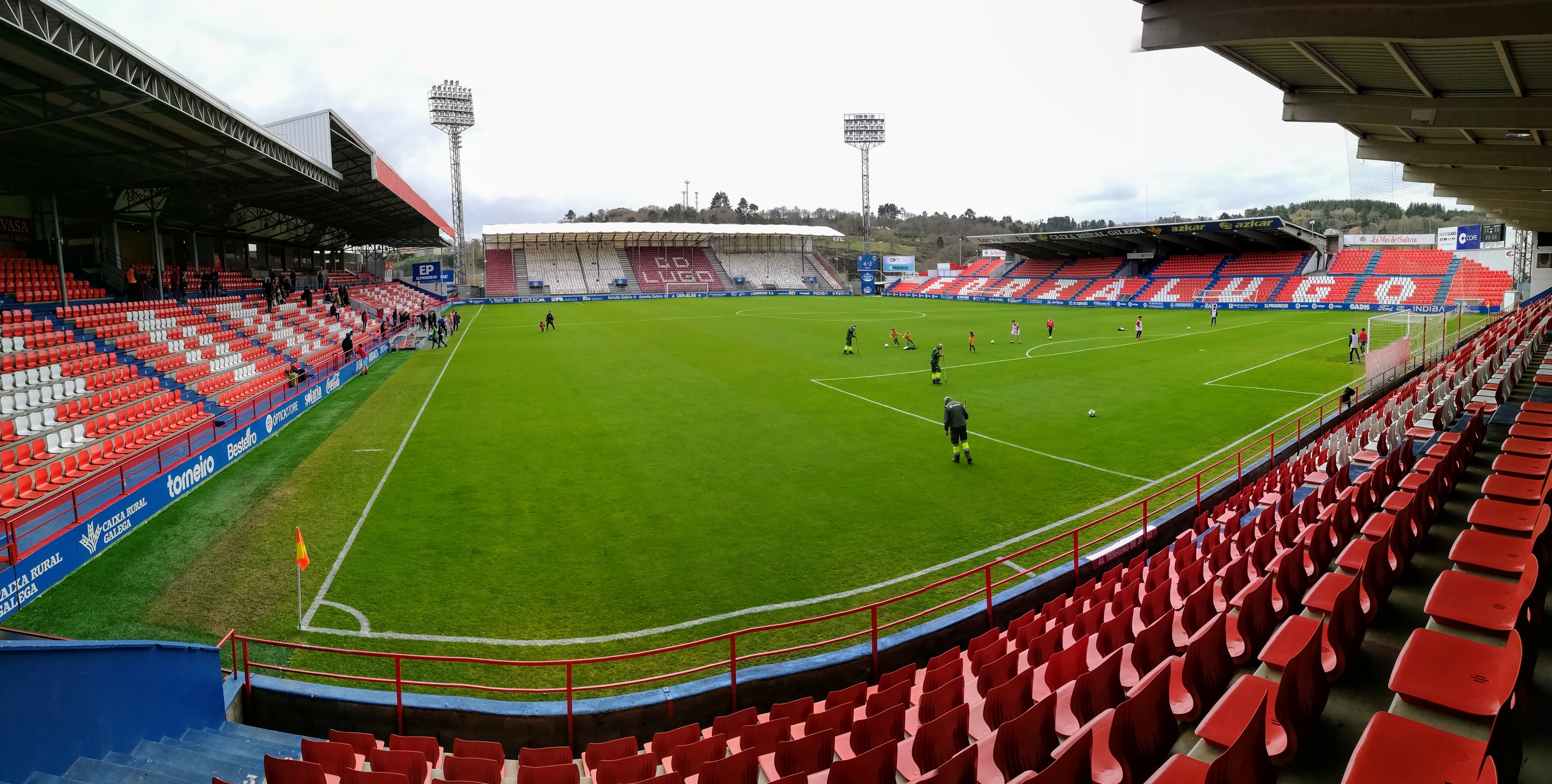
- Interactive map of Anxo Carro
- Full name: Estadio Anxo Carro
- Location: Lugo, Spain
- Capacity: 7,114
- Surface: Grass
- Record attendance: 7,564 (Lugo vs Deportivo, 3 May 2014)
- Field size: 105 m × 70 m (344 ft × 230 ft)

Construction
- Opened: 1974

Tenants
- CD Lugo; CD Lugo B

The Estadio Anxo Carro, also known as Estadio Ángel Carro, is a stadium located in Lugo, Galicia, Spain. It is currently used for football matches and is the home of CD Lugo.

== History ==
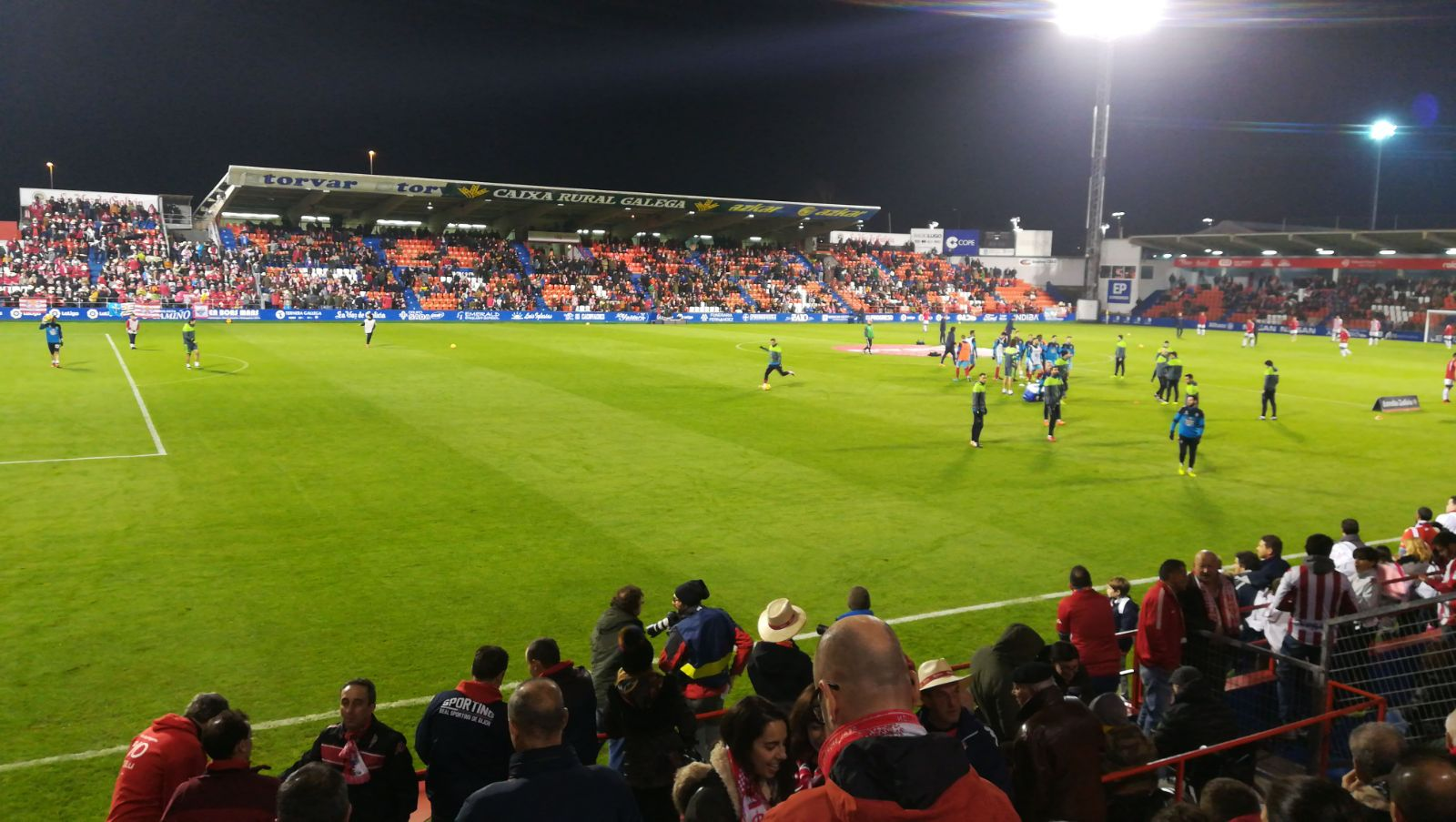
Estadio Anxo Carro, before a match between Lugo and Sporting Gijón.

The stadium was inaugurated on 31 August 1974, with an original capacity of 5,000 spectators. The first match was played between CD Lugo and Club Lemos and the home team won by 1–0. This match was part of a tournament that involved both teams and Deportivo de La Coruña. The stadium is named Ángel Carro as he was the person who ordered its construction.

After the second promotion of CD Lugo to Segunda División and its consolidation in the category, the stadium was expanded with a new stand to 8,168 seats, thanks to an agreement between the club and a local entrepreneur.

In the beginning of the 2015–16 season there was a modernization of the stadium. All the seats on the north, east and west sides were replaced. After the last renovation of the south stand in 2019 the total seating capacity was reduced to 7,070 seats.
