= 2018–19 UD Almería season =

UD Almería
2018–19 season
- President: Alfonso García
- Head coach: Fran Fernández
- Stadium: Juegos Mediterráneos
- Segunda División: 10th
- Copa del Rey: Round of 32
- Top goalscorer: League: Álvaro Giménez (20); All: Álvaro Giménez (20)
- Highest home attendance: 11,532 vs. Granada (17 Mar)
- Lowest home attendance: 3,504 vs. Reus (18 Oct)
- Average home league attendance: 7,363 (22 matches)
Home colours	Away colours

The 2018–19 season was UD Almería's twentieth eighth season of existence and the fourth consecutive in Segunda División.

== Squad ==
As of 17 June 2019

No.	Name	Pos.	Nat.	Place of birth	Date of birth (age)	Club caps	Club goals	Int. caps	Int. goals	Signed from	Date signed	Fee	Contract End
Goalkeepers
1	René Román (c)	GK	(Spain) (Andalusia)	El Bosque	15 December 1983 (aged 35)	79	0	–	–	Girona	5 July 2017	Free	30 June 2021
13	Fernando	GK	(Spain) (Region of Murcia)	Murcia	10 June 1990 (aged 28)	9	0	–	–	UCAM Murcia	5 July 2017	Free	30 June 2021
30	Jero Lario	GK	(Spain) (Region of Murcia)	Lorca	7 February 1995 (aged 24)	–	–	–	–	Almería B	1 February 2019	Free	30 June 2020
32	Albert Batalla	GK	(Spain) (Catalonia)	Balaguer	4 June 1998 (aged 21)	–	–	–	–	Almería B	6 September 2016	Free	Undisclosed
Defenders
2	Fran Rodríguez	RB/RW	(Spain) (Andalusia)	Almuñécar	22 May 1995 (aged 24)	22	2	–	–	Zaragoza	12 July 2017	Free	30 June 2019
3	Lucien Owona	CB	(Cameroon)	Douala	9 August 1990 (aged 28)	45	2	1	0	Alcorcón	22 July 2017	Free	30 June 2020
4	José Romera	RB	(Spain) (Valencian Community)	Xirivella	8 September 1987 (aged 31)	38	0	–	–	Dinamo B. (Romania)	12 July 2018	Free	30 June 2019
5	Ángel Trujillo	CB	(Spain) (Community of Madrid)	Madrid	8 September 1987 (aged 31)	163	1	–	–	Levante	5 August 2016	Free	30 June 2019
15	Juan Ibiza	CB	(Spain) (Balearic Islands)	Ibiza	17 August 1995 (aged 23)	25	0	–	–	Villarreal	16 July 2018	Loan	30 June 2019
18	Andoni López	LB	(Spain) (Basque Country (autonomous community))	Barakaldo	5 April 1996 (aged 23)	18	1	–	–	Athletic Bilbao	18 August 2018	Loan	30 June 2019
21	Nano	LB	(Spain) (Andalusia)	Málaga	27 October 1984 (aged 34)	74	0	–	–	Panathinaikos (Greece)	24 August 2016	Free	30 June 2019
22	Adri Montoro	RB/CB	(Spain) (Catalonia)	Terrassa	4 January 1995 (aged 24)	7	1	–	–	Sporting B	29 June 2018	Free	30 June 2021
24	Esteban Saveljich	CB	(Montenegro)	Tandil (Argentina)	20 May 1991 (aged 28)	51	2	4	0	Levante	31 August 2018	Loan	30 June 2019
27	Dani Urri	CB	(Spain) (Andalusia)	San Fernando	17 March 1996 (aged 23)	–	–	–	–	Almería B	4 December 2018	Free	Undisclosed
29	Iván Martos	LB/CB	(Spain) (Catalonia)	Manresa	15 May 1997 (aged 22)	27	0	–	–	Almería B	7 December 2017	Free	30 June 2022
32	Antonio Navas	RB	(Spain) (Andalusia)	El Ejido	13 February 1995 (aged 24)	3	0	–	–	Almería B	6 September 2016	Free	Undisclosed
Midfielders
6	César de la Hoz	CM	(Spain) (Cantabria)	Orejo	30 March 1992 (aged 27)	41	1	–	–	Betis	4 July 2018	Free	30 June 2020
7	Gaspar	LW	(Spain) (Castilla–La Mancha)	Tarazona la Mancha	9 December 1997 (aged 21)	36	2	–	–	Almería B	11 September 2014	Free	30 June 2021
8	Chema	AM/RW	(Spain) (Andalusia)	La Puebla del Río	16 September 1997 (aged 21)	31	2	–	–	Almería B	27 June 2018	Free	30 June 2019
10	Juan Carlos	AM/LW/CM	(Spain) (Galicia (Spain))	A Coruña	15 March 1991 (aged 28)	40	10	–	–	Tenerife	27 July 2018	Free	30 June 2019
12	Juanjo Narváez	AM/LW/RW	(Colombia)	Pasto	12 February 1995 (aged 24)	33	2	–	–	Betis	31 August 2018	Loan	30 June 2019
14	Luis Rioja	LW/RW	(Spain) (Andalusia)	Seville	16 October 1993 (aged 25)	41	5	–	–	Marbella	23 July 2018	Undisc.	30 June 2020
16	Sergio Aguza	CM/AM	(Spain) (Catalonia)	Sant Boi	2 September 1992 (aged 26)	16	2	–	–	Córdoba	13 July 2018	Free	30 June 2020
17	José Corpas	RW	(Spain) (Andalusia)	Baños de la Encina	7 July 1991 (aged 27)	42	3	–	–	Marbella	3 July 2018	Free	30 June 2020
23	David Rocha	CM	(Spain) (Extremadura)	Cáceres	7 February 1985 (aged 34)	10	0	–	–	Gimnàstic	24 January 2019	Free	30 June 2019
25	Yan Eteki	DM/CM	(Cameroon)	Yaoundé	26 August 1997 (aged 21)	33	0	–	–	Sevilla B	23 August 2018	Undisc.	30 June 2020
26	Francisco Callejón	CM	(Spain) (Andalusia)	Pujaire	15 May 1998 (aged 21)	5	0	–	–	Almería B	8 April 2017	Free	Undisclosed
28	Javi Moreno	LW	(Spain) (Andalusia)	Almería	14 June 1996 (aged 21)	0	0	–	–	Almería B	13 May 2018	Free	Undisclosed
33	Sergio Pérez	RW	(Spain) (Andalusia)	Gerena	4 June 1997 (aged 22)	2	1	–	–	Almería B	17 May 2018	Free	Undisclosed
36	Mario Abenza	CM	(Spain) (Region of Murcia)	Murcia	19 February 1996 (aged 23)	3	0	–	–	Almería B	17 July 2018	Free	Undisclosed
39	Lin Liangming	RW/LW	(China)	Shantou	4 June 1997 (aged 22)	4	0	–	–	Real Madrid B	29 July 2018	Loan	30 June 2019
Forwards
9	Pablo Caballero	ST	(Argentina)	Totoras	21 July 1986 (aged 32)	43	5	–	–	Lugo	17 July 2017	Free	30 June 2019
11	Ermedin Demirović	ST	(Bosnia and Herzegovina)	Sarajevo	25 March 1998 (aged 21)	13	0	–	–	Alavés	17 January 2019	Loan	30 June 2019
20	Álvaro Giménez	ST/LW	(Spain) (Valencian Community)	Elche	19 May 1991 (aged 28)	39	20	–	–	Alcorcón	2 July 2018	Free	30 June 2020

== Transfers ==
=== In ===
No.	Pos.	Nat.	Name	Age	EU	Moving from	Type	Transfer window	Ends	Transfer fee	Source
19	FW	(Senegal)	Sekou Gassama	23	EU	Almería B	Promoted	Summer	2019	Free	Cadena SER
8	MF	(Spain)	Chema	20	EU	Almería B	Promoted	Summer	2019	Free	La Voz de Almería
22	DF	(Spain)	Adri Montoro	23	EU	Sporting Gijón B	Transfer	Summer	2021	Free	UD Almería
11	DF	(Spain)	Samu de los Reyes	26	EU	GIF Sundsvall (Sweden)	Transfer	Summer	2019	Free	UD Almería
20	FW	(Spain)	Álvaro Giménez	27	EU	Alcorcón	Transfer	Summer	2020	Free	UD Almería
17	MF	(Spain)	José Corpas	26	EU	Marbella	Transfer	Summer	2020	Free	UD Almería
6	MF	(Spain)	César de la Hoz	26	EU	Betis	Transfer	Summer	2020	Free	UD Almería
4	DF	(Spain)	José Romera	30	EU	Dinamo București (Romania)	Transfer	Summer	2019	Free	UD Almería
16	MF	(Spain)	Sergio Aguza	25	EU	Córdoba	Transfer	Summer	2020	Free	UD Almería
15	DF	(Spain)	Juan Ibiza	22	EU	Villarreal	Loan	Summer	2019	Free	UD Almería
23	MF	(Argentina)	Joaquín Arzura	25	EU	River Plate (Argentina)	Loan	Summer	2019	Free	UD Almería
—	FW	(Spain)	Dani Suárez	23	EU	Free agent	Trial	Summer	2018	Free	Ideal
14	MF	(Spain)	Luis Rioja	24	EU	Marbella	Transfer	Summer	2020	Undisclosed	UD Almería
10	MF	(Spain)	Juan Carlos	27	EU	Tenerife	Transfer	Summer	2019	Free	UD Almería
18	DF	(Spain)	Andoni López	22	EU	Athletic Bilbao	Loan	Summer	2019	Free	UD Almería
25	MF	(Cameroon)	Yan Eteki	20	EU	Sevilla Atlético	Transfer	Summer	2020	Undisclosed	UD Almería
24	DF	(Montenegro)	Esteban Saveljich	28	EU	Levante	Loan	Summer	2019	Free	UD Almería
12	MF	(Colombia)	Juanjo Narváez	23	EU	Betis	Loan	Summer	2019	Free	UD Almería
11	FW	(Bosnia and Herzegovina)	Ermedin Demirović	20	EU	Alavés	Loan	Winter	2019	Free	Deportivo Alavés
23	MF	(Spain)	David Rocha	33	EU	Gimnàstic	Transfer	Winter	2019	Free	UD Almería

Total spending: ▼€0

=== Out ===
No.	Pos.	Nat.	Name	Age	EU	Moving to	Type	Transfer window	Transfer fee	Source
23	DF	(Spain)	Jorge Morcillo	32	EU	Ironi Kiryat Shmona (Israel)	Contract ended	Summer	Free	UD Almería
6	MF	(Spain)	Mandi	29	EU	Free agent	Contract ended	Summer	Free	UD Almería
8	MF	(Argentina)	Tino Costa	33	EU	San Martín de Tucumán (Argentina)	Contract ended	Summer	Free	UD Almería
11	MF	(Spain)	Javi Álamo	29	EU	Free agent	Contract ended	Summer	Free	UD Almería
30	DF	(Ecuador)	Pervis Estupiñán	20	Non-EU	Watford (England)	Loan return	Summer	Free	UD Almería
4	MF	(Spain)	Verza	31	EU	Levante	Loan return	Summer	Free	UD Almería
18	MF	(The Gambia)	Sulayman Marreh	22	EU	Watford (England)	Loan return	Summer	Free	UD Almería
14	MF	(Spain)	Rubén Alcaraz	27	EU	Girona	Loan return	Summer	Free	UD Almería
17	MF	(Guinea)	Lass Bangoura	26	EU	Rayo Vallecano	Loan return	Summer	Free	UD Almería
9	FW	(Spain)	Juan Muñoz	22	EU	Sevilla	Loan return	Summer	Free	UD Almería
22	FW	(Italy)	Edoardo Soleri	20	EU	Roma (Italy)	Loan return	Summer	Free	UD Almería
16	MF	(Spain)	Fidel	28	EU	Las Palmas	Transfer	Summer	Undisclosed	UD Almería
7	DF	(Italy)	Marco Motta	32	EU	Omonia (Cyprus)	Contract rescinded	Summer	Free	Marca
19	FW	(Morocco)	Hicham Khaloua	23	EU	Castellón	Loan	Summer	Free	CD Castellón
10	MF	(Spain)	José Ángel Pozo	22	EU	Rayo Vallecano	Transfer	Summer	Undisclosed	UD Almería
24	DF	(Spain)	Joaquín	22	EU	Valladolid	Transfer	Summer	Undisclosed	UD Almería
11	DF	(Spain)	Samu de los Reyes	26	EU	Marbella	Contract rescinded	Winter	Free	UD Almería
23	MF	(Argentina)	Joaquín Arzura	25	EU	River Plate (Argentina)	Loan ended	Winter	Free	UD Almería
19	FW	(Senegal)	Sekou Gassama	23	EU	Valencia Mestalla	Loan	Winter	Free	UD Almería

Total gaining: ▲€0

Balance

Total: ▼€0

== Coaches ==
Name	Nat.	Place of birth	Date of birth (age)	Signed from	Date signed	Role	G	W	D	L	%	Departure	Manner	Contract End
Fran Fernández	(Spain) (Andalusia)	Almería	20 March 1980 (aged 39)	Almería B	24 April 2018	Permanent	40	14	15	11	35.00			30 June 2019
Jesús Muñoz	(Spain) (Castilla–La Mancha)	Mota del Cuervo	1 January 1976 (aged 43)	Almería	3 September 2018	Interim (Note: Interim for the match against Málaga (3 September), as Fran Fernández was suspended.)	1	0	0	1	0.00	3 September 2018	End of spell	30 June 2019

=== Staff members ===
Name	Staff role
Jesús Muñoz	Assistant coach
Víctor Fortes	Fitness coach
Edu Frapoli	Fitness coach
Ricardo Molina	Goalkeeping coach
Misael Rivas	Doctor
Fran Simón	Physio
Pedro Serrano	Physio

Source: UD Almería's official website

== Player statistics ==
=== Squad statistics ===
As of 17 June 2019

No.	Pos	Nat	Player	Total		Segunda División		Copa del Rey	
No.	Pos	Nat	Player	Apps	Goals	Apps	Goals	Apps	Goals
1	GK	(Spain) ESP	René	37	0	37	0	0	0
2	DF	(Spain) ESP	Fran Rodríguez	0	0	0	0	0	0
3	DF	(Cameroon) CMR	Lucien Owona	24	2	22+2	2	0	0
4	DF	(Spain) ESP	José Romera	38	0	38	0	0	0
5	DF	(Spain) ESP	Ángel Trujillo	9	0	4+1	0	4	0
6	MF	(Spain) ESP	César de la Hoz	41	1	39+1	1	1	0
7	MF	(Spain) ESP	Gaspar	3	0	0+3	0	0	0
8	MF	(Spain) ESP	Chema	31	2	3+24	1	4	1
9	FW	(Argentina) ARG	Pablo Caballero	15	2	1+11	2	2+1	0
10	MF	(Spain) ESP	Juan Carlos	40	10	37+2	10	0+1	0
11	FW	(Bosnia and Herzegovina) BIH	Ermedin Demirović	13	0	1+12	0	0	0
12	MF	(Colombia) COL	Juanjo Narváez	33	2	11+19	2	2+1	0
13	GK	(Spain) ESP	Fernando	8	0	4	0	4	0
14	MF	(Spain) ESP	Luis Rioja	41	5	35+4	4	0+2	1
15	DF	(Spain) ESP	Juan Ibiza	25	0	21+2	0	2	0
16	MF	(Spain) ESP	Sergio Aguza	16	2	4+10	1	1+1	1
17	MF	(Spain) ESP	José Corpas	42	3	37+3	3	1+1	0
18	DF	(Spain) ESP	Andoni López	18	1	17+1	1	0	0
20	FW	(Spain) ESP	Álvaro Giménez	39	20	38+1	20	0	0
21	DF	(Spain) ESP	Nano	2	0	1	0	1	0
22	DF	(Spain) ESP	Adri Montoro	7	1	2+1	0	4	1
23	MF	(Spain) ESP	David Rocha	10	0	3+7	0	0	0
24	DF	(Montenegro) MNE	Esteban Saveljich	34	1	33	1	0+1	0
25	MF	(Cameroon) CMR	Yan Eteki	33	0	29+2	0	2	0
26	MF	(Spain) ESP	Francisco Callejón	2	0	0	0	2	0
27	DF	(Spain) ESP	Dani Urri	0	0	0	0	0	0
28	MF	(Spain) ESP	Javi Moreno	0	0	0	0	0	0
29	DF	(Spain) ESP	Iván Martos	27	0	23	0	4	0
30	GK	(Spain) ESP	Jero Lario	0	0	0	0	0	0
32	GK	(Spain) ESP	Albert Batalla	0	0	0	0	0	0
33	MF	(Spain) ESP	Sergio Pérez	2	1	0+1	0	1	1
36	MF	(Spain) ESP	Mario Abenza	3	0	0	0	2+1	0
39	MF	(China) CHN	Lin Liangming	3	0	0	0	3	0
Players on loan to other clubs:
19	FW	(Senegal) SEN	Sekou Gassama	15	3	1+10	0	2+2	3
Players who have left the club after the start of the season:
11	DF	(Spain) ESP	Samu de los Reyes	0	0	0	0	0	0
23	MF	(Argentina) ARG	Joaquín Arzura	13	0	8+2	0	2+1	0
24	DF	(Spain) ESP	Joaquín	2	0	2	0	0	0
30	GK	(Spain) ESP	Guille Lara	0	0	0	0	0	0

=== Top scorers ===
Place	Position	Nation	Number	Name	Segunda División	Copa del Rey	Total
1	FW	(Spain)	20	Álvaro Giménez	20	0	20
2	MF	(Spain)	10	Juan Carlos	10	0	10
3	MF	(Spain)	14	Luis Rioja	4	1	5
4	MF	(Spain)	17	José Corpas	3	0	3
4	FW	(Senegal)	19	Sekou Gassama	0	3	3
5	DF	(Cameroon)	3	Lucien Owona	2	0	2
5	FW	(Argentina)	9	Pablo Caballero	2	0	2
5	MF	(Colombia)	12	Juanjo Narváez	2	0	2
5	MF	(Spain)	8	Chema	1	1	2
5	MF	(Spain)	16	Sergio Aguza	1	1	2
6	MF	(Spain)	6	César de la Hoz	1	0	1
6	DF	(Spain)	18	Andoni López	1	0	1
6	DF	(Montenegro)	24	Esteban Saveljich	1	0	1
6	DF	(Spain)	22	Adri Montoro	0	1	1
6	MF	(Spain)	33	Sergio Pérez	0	1	1
Own goals					2	0	2
				TOTALS	50	8	58

=== Disciplinary record ===
Number	Nation	Position	Name	Segunda División			Copa del Rey			Total		
Number	Nation	Position	Name	Yellow card	(yellow card) (yellow-red card)	Red card	Yellow card	(yellow card) (yellow-red card)	Red card	Yellow card	(yellow card) (yellow-red card)	Red card
25	(Cameroon)	MF	Yan Eteki	17	0	0	1	0	0	18	0	0
3	(Cameroon)	DF	Lucien Owona	9	0	0	0	0	0	9	0	0
24	(Montenegro)	DF	Esteban Saveljich	7	0	1	0	0	0	7	0	1
10	(Spain)	MF	Juan Carlos	7	1	0	0	0	0	7	1	0
16	(Spain)	MF	Sergio Aguza	5	1	0	2	0	0	7	1	0
6	(Spain)	MF	César de la Hoz	5	1	0	0	0	0	5	1	0
20	(Spain)	FW	Álvaro Giménez	5	0	0	0	0	0	5	0	0
14	(Spain)	MF	Luis Rioja	4	0	0	1	0	0	5	0	0
29	(Spain)	DF	Iván Martos	4	0	0	1	0	0	5	0	0
22	(Spain)	DF	Adri Montoro	1	1	1	3	0	0	4	1	1
17	(Spain)	MF	José Corpas	3	0	1	1	0	0	4	0	1
4	(Spain)	DF	José Romera	4	0	0	0	0	0	4	0	0
18	(Spain)	DF	Andoni López	4	0	0	0	0	0	4	0	0
15	(Spain)	DF	Juan Ibiza	3	1	0	0	0	0	3	1	0
1	(Spain)	GK	René	3	0	0	0	0	0	3	0	0
5	(Spain)	DF	Ángel Trujillo	2	0	0	1	0	0	3	0	0
19	(Senegal)	FW	Sekou Gassama	2	0	0	1	0	0	3	0	0
8	(Spain)	MF	Chema	2	0	0	0	0	0	2	0	0
11	(Bosnia and Herzegovina)	FW	Ermedin Demirović	2	0	0	0	0	0	2	0	0
23	(Argentina)	MF	Joaquín Arzura	1	0	0	2	0	0	3	0	0
—	(Spain)	M	Fran Fernández	—	—	1	—	—	0	—	—	1
9	(Argentina)	FW	Pablo Caballero	1	0	0	0	0	0	1	0	0
12	(Colombia)	MF	Juanjo Narváez	1	0	0	0	0	0	1	0	0
33	(Spain)	MF	Sergio Pérez	0	0	0	1	0	0	1	0	0
			TOTALS	92	5	4	14	0	0	106	5	4

== Competitions ==
=== Pre-season/Friendlies ===
18 July 2018	Almería	0 – 0	MK Dons	Murcia
19:00	Arzura (yellow card) 70'	Report	(yellow card) 13' Nesbitt; (yellow card) 57' Lewington	Stadium: Pinatar Arena

21 July 2018	Águilas	0 – 5	Almería	Águilas
20:00		Report	32' 38' Álvaro; 45' Sergio Pérez; 61' Sekou; 82' (o.g.) Rubén Primo	Stadium: El Rubial

25 July 2018	Almería	0 – 1	Valladolid	Marbella
20:00	Sekou (yellow card) 14'	Report	9' Robles; (yellow card) 23' Nacho; (yellow card) 87' Moi	Stadium: Marbella Football Center; Referee: Javier Alberola Rojas

29 July 2018	Almería	0 – 1	Tenerife	Marbella
20:00	Arzura (yellow card) 46'; Sekou (yellow card) 60'	Report	16' (yellow card) 39' Alberto	Stadium: Marbella Football Center; Referee: Ignacio Iglesias Villanueva

31 July 2018	Almería	1 – 1	Málaga	Marbella
19:00	Sekou 75' (pen.)	Report	9' Harper; (yellow card) 59' Ricca	Stadium: Marbella Football Center

4 August 2018	El Ejido	0 – 3	Almería	El Ejido
20:00		Report	46' 67' Chema; 90+1' Álvaro	Stadium: Santo Domingo; Referee: José Antonio Sánchez

8 August 2018	Melilla	0 – 4	Almería	Motril
20:45	Garrido (yellow card) 59'	Report	25' (yellow card) 42' de la Hoz; (yellow card) 32' (goal) 53' Corpas; 56' 76' Álvaro	Stadium: Escribano Castilla; Referee: Luis Alcoba Montes

10 August 2018	Elche	1 – 0	Almería	Elche
20:45	Villar 68'	Report	(yellow card) 74' Ibiza; (yellow card) 84' Navas	Stadium: Martínez Valero; Referee: Isidro Díaz de Mera

23 January 2019	Almería	1 – 1	Nordsjælland	Almería
	Demirović 51'	Report	44' Rasmussen	Stadium: Juegos Mediterráneos; Referee: José Antonio Sánchez Villalobos

15 February 2019	Almería	1 – 1	FC Ufa	Cartagena
	Rocha 39'	Report	11' Nedelcearu	Stadium: Cartagonova; Referee: Kevin Javier Moreno Muñoz

=== Segunda División ===
Pos	Team	Pld	W	D	L	GF	GA	GD	Pts
8	Oviedo	42	17	12	13	48	48	0	63
9	Sporting Gijón	42	16	13	13	43	38	+5	61
10	Almería	42	15	15	12	51	39	+12	60
11	Elche	42	13	16	13	49	52	−3	55
12	Las Palmas	42	12	18	12	48	50	−2	54

Source: La Liga
Rules for classification: 1) points; 2) head-to-head points; 3) head-to-head goal difference; 4) goal difference; 5) number of goals scored

==== Results summary ====
Overall								Home						Away					
Pld	W	D	L	GF	GA	GD	Pts	W	D	L	GF	GA	GD	W	D	L	GF	GA	GD
42	15	15	12	51	39	+12	60	10	8	3	32	15	+17	5	7	9	19	24	−5

Last updated: 17 June 2019.
Source: Competitive matches

==== Results by round ====
Round	1	2	3	4	5	6	7	8	9	10	11	12	13	14	15	16	17	18	19	20	21	22	23	24	25	26	27	28	29	30	31	32	33	34	35	36	37	38	39	40	41	42
Ground	A	H	H	A	H	A	H	A	H	A	A	H	A	H	A	H	A	H	A	H	A	H	H	A	H	A	H	A	A	H	A	H	A	H	A	H	A	H	A	H	A	H
Result	L	D	L	L	W	W	W	L	W	D	L	W	L	D	D	D	W	D	D	W	D	D	L	D	W	W	W	W	L	D	D	D	L	W	W	L	L	W	L	D	D	W
Position	20	16	18	20	17	13	9	11	8	9	9	7	10	12	11	12	10	11	10	9	10	10	10	11	10	10	10	8	9	9	9	9	10	10	10	10	10	9	9	9	10	10

Updated to match(es) played on 17 June 2019. Source:
A = Away; H = Home; W = Win; D = Draw; L = Loss

==== Matches ====
17 August 2018 1	Cádiz	1 – 0	Almería	Cádiz
20:00	Matos (yellow card) 30'; Agra (yellow card) 56'; José Mari (yellow card) 71'; Álex 76'; Aketxe (yellow card) 88'	Report	(yellow card) 2' Sekou; (yellow card) 28' Owona; (yellow card) 50' Rioja; (yellow card) 52' Chema	Stadium: Ramón de Carranza; Attendance: 13,582; Referee: Daniel Jesús Trujillo Suárez

26 August 2018 2	Almería	1 – 1	Tenerife	Almería
22:00	Rioja 22'; Trujillo (yellow card) 42' de la Hoz (yellow card) 49' (yellow-red card) 54'; Eteki (yellow card) 83'; López (yellow card) 88'; Fran Fernández (red card) 89'		(yellow card) 16' Luis Pérez; (yellow card) 28' (goal) 81' Malbašić; (yellow card) 30' Cámara; (yellow card) 90+3' Naranjo	Stadium: Juegos Mediterráneos; Attendance: 6,667; Referee: Isidro Díaz de Mera

3 September 2018 3	Almería	0 – 1	Málaga	Almería
21:00	Ibiza (yellow card) 90'		24' Harper; (yellow card) 88' Boulahroud; (yellow card) 90+3' N'Diaye	Stadium: Juegos Mediterráneos; Attendance: 9,118; Referee: Valentín Pizarro Gómez

8 September 2018 4	Osasuna	3 – 1	Almería	Pamplona
16:00	Villar 14'; Aridane (yellow card) 37'; Rubén García 65' (pen.); Barja 69'		16' Álvaro; (yellow card) 60' Trujillo	Stadium: El Sadar; Attendance: 12,818; Referee: David Pérez Pallas

16 September 2018 5	Almería	2 – 1	Zaragoza	Almería
18:30	Grippo 65' (o.g.); Corpas 88'		67' Lasure	Stadium: Juegos Mediterráneos; Attendance: 7,251; Referee: Víctor Areces Franco

23 September 2018 6	Numancia	0 – 2	Almería	Soria
18:00			45+1' Juan Carlos; 87' Chema; (yellow card) 90+2' René	Stadium: Los Pajaritos; Attendance: 3,206; Referee: César Soto Grado

30 September 2018 7	Almería	2 – 0	Reus	Almería
18:00	de la Hoz 16'; Eteki (yellow card) 27'; Álvaro 49' (pen.); Sekou (yellow card) 77'		(yellow card) 81' Catena	Stadium: Juegos Mediterráneos; Attendance: 7,617; Referee: Juan Luis Pulido Santana

6 October 2018 8	Córdoba	1 – 0	Almería	Córdoba
20:00	Jovanović (yellow card) 18'; Aguado (yellow card) 26'; Loureiro (yellow card) 47'; Quezada (yellow card) 71'; Piovaccari 74' (yellow card) 74'; Bambock (yellow card) 80'; Aythami (yellow card) 90+4' (yellow-red card) 90+4'		(yellow card) 62' Aguza; (yellow card) 64' de la Hoz; (red card) 90+3' Corpas	Stadium: El Arcángel; Attendance: 11,326; Referee: Álvaro Moreno Aragón

13 October 2018 9	Almería	3 – 0	Las Palmas	Almería
20:30	Narváez 9'; Juan Carlos 66'; Eteki (yellow card) 81'; Lemos 85' (o.g.)		(yellow card) 45+2' Cala; (yellow card) 61' Mantovani; (yellow card) 68' Timor	Stadium: Juegos Mediterráneos; Attendance: 7,400; Referee: Javier Iglesias Villanueva

21 October 2018 10	Albacete	1 – 1	Almería	Albacete
18:00	Caro (red card) 9'; Bela 63' (yellow card) 90+3'; Zozulya (yellow card) 90+3'		(yellow card) 66' Eteki; (yellow card) 75' Juan Carlos; 80' (yellow card) 81' Álvaro	Stadium: Carlos Belmonte; Attendance: 8,075; Referee: Daniel Ocón Arráiz

27 October 2018 11	Granada	1 – 0	Almería	Granada
18:00	Rodri (yellow card) 44'; Puertas (yellow card) 44'; Germán (yellow card) 45'; Pozo 89'; Montoro (yellow card) 90+2'		(yellow card) 45' Juan Carlos; (yellow card) 68' Eteki	Stadium: Nuevo Los Cármenes; Attendance: 10,228; Referee: Dámaso Arcediano Monescillo

4 November 2018 12	Almería	2 – 1	Sporting Gijón	Almería
18:00	Álvaro 35' (pen.); Owona (yellow card) 41'; López 73' (yellow card) 74'		10' Pablo Pérez; (yellow card) 35' Molinero; (yellow card) 90+2' Salvador	Stadium: Juegos Mediterráneos; Attendance: 7,424; Referee: Saúl Ais Reig

11 November 2018 13	Rayo Majadahonda	2 – 0	Almería	Madrid
16:00	Andújar (yellow card) 31'; Ruibal 43' (yellow card) 84'; Luso (yellow card) 43'; Valentín (yellow card) 45+1'; Aitor 89'	Report	(yellow card) 12' Saveljich; (yellow card) 55' López; (yellow card) 68' Eteki; (yellow card) 88' Romera	Stadium: Wanda Metropolitano; Attendance: 2,216; Referee: Aitor Gorostegui Fernández Ortega

19 November 2018 14	Almería	1 – 1	Deportivo La Coruña	Almería
21:00	Narváez 75'; Romera (yellow card) 83'	Summary	(yellow card) 32' Expósito; 84' Cartabia	Stadium: Juegos Mediterráneos; Attendance: 5,977; Referee: Rubén Ávalos Barrera

24 November 2018 15	Gimnàstic	2 – 2	Almería	Tarragona
16:00	Imanol 3'; Márquez (yellow card) 20'; Suárez (yellow card) 45+2'; Albentosa (yellow card) 56'; Barreiro 64'; Fali (yellow card) 90+4'	Summary	38' 43' Owona; (yellow card) 63' López; (yellow card) 68' Eteki; (yellow card) 87' (yellow-red card) 89' Juan Carlos	Stadium: Nou Estadi; Attendance: 6,514; Referee: Valentín Pizarro Gómez

1 December 2018 16	Almería	1 – 1	Extremadura	Almería
20:00	Saveljich (yellow card) 3'; Álvaro 23' (yellow card) 73'; Eteki (yellow card) 26'; Owona (yellow card) 53'		18' Gallego; (yellow card) 29' Pomares; (yellow card) 46' Fausto; (yellow card) 74' Granero	Stadium: Juegos Mediterráneos; Attendance: 6,232; Referee: David Pérez Pallas

8 December 2018 17	Oviedo	1 – 2	Almería	Oviedo
20:00	Mossa 2'; Muñoz (yellow card) 51'; Javi Hernández (yellow card) 71' (yellow-red card) 75'; Tejera (yellow card) 79'; Bárcenas (yellow card) 90+5'		15' (yellow card) 57' Corpas; 18' Juan Carlos; (yellow card) 69' Álvaro; (yellow card) 80' Eteki	Stadium: Carlos Tartiere; Attendance: 12,408; Referee: Ignacio Iglesias Villanueva

16 December 2018 18	Almería	1 – 1	Lugo	Almería
20:00	Juan Carlos 7'; Owona (yellow card) 15'; Eteki (yellow card) 18'; Martos (yellow card) 41'; Sekou (red card) 88'; Narváez (yellow card) 89'		19' Herrera; (yellow card) 26' (yellow-red card) 36' Luis Ruiz; (yellow card) 90+4' José Carlos	Stadium: Juegos Mediterráneos; Attendance: 6,160; Referee: César Soto Grado

22 December 2018 19	Elche	2 – 2	Almería	Elche
20:00	Flores 4' (yellow card) 81'; Manuel (yellow card) 20'; Iván Sánchez (yellow card) 40'; Benja (yellow card) 56'; González (yellow card) 63'; Torres 74' (pen.) (yellow card) 88'		(yellow card) 29' Arzura; 54' Álvaro; 64' Juan Carlos	Stadium: Martínez Valero; Attendance: 7,466; Referee: Óliver de la Fuente Ramos

6 January 2019 20	Almería	2 – 0	Mallorca	Almería
12:00	Corpas (yellow card) 27'; Romera (yellow card) 29'; Álvaro 45+1' (pen.) (penalty missed) 65'; Juan Carlos 71'; Aguza (penalty missed) 87'		(yellow card) 25' Pedraza; (yellow card) 63' Raíllo; (yellow card) 86' Estupiñán	Stadium: Juegos Mediterráneos; Attendance: 5,796; Referee: Daniel Jesús Trujillo Suárez

13 January 2019 21	Alcorcón	0 – 0	Almería	Alcorcón
21:00	Eddy (yellow card) 82'		(yellow card) 48' Eteki; (yellow card) 90+3' Caballero	Stadium: Santo Domingo; Attendance: 2,875; Referee: Aitor Gorostegui Fernández Ortega

19 January 2019 22	Almería	0 – 0	Cádiz	Almería
16:00	Eteki (yellow card) 17'; Juan Carlos (yellow card) 21'; Martos (yellow card) 31'; Saveljich (yellow card) 90+4'		(penalty missed) 18' Álex; (yellow card) 35' Ramos; (yellow card) 42' Lekić; (yellow card) 60' (yellow-red card) 75' José Mari	Stadium: Juegos Mediterráneos; Attendance: 7,804; Referee: José Antonio López Toca

26 January 2019 23	Almería	0 – 1	Osasuna	Almería
16:00	Saveljich (yellow card) 24'; Aguza (yellow card) 65' de la Hoz (yellow card) 77'; Rioja (yellow card) 90+2'		(yellow card) 34' Aridane; 75' (yellow card) 88' Brandon	Stadium: Juegos Mediterráneos; Attendance: 7,070; Referee: Valentín Pizarro Gómez

1 February 2019 24	Málaga	1 – 1	Almería	Málaga
21:00	Adrián 12'; Morán (yellow card) 25'; N'Diaye (yellow card) 72'		(yellow card) 59' Owona; (yellow card) 70' Juan Carlos; (yellow card) 86' Demirović; 90+1' Rioja	Stadium: La Rosaleda; Attendance: 13,313; Referee: Víctor Areces Franco

10 February 2019 25	Almería	1 – 0	Numancia	Almería
18:00	Juan Carlos 22'; Ibiza (yellow card) 23'; Romera (yellow card) 34'; Rioja (yellow card) 79'; Eteki (yellow card) 90+1'		(red card) 70' Medina; (yellow card) 74' Oyarzun; (yellow card) 90+6' Atienza; (yellow card) 90+7' Juan Carlos	Stadium: Juegos Mediterráneos; Attendance: 7,394; Referee: Isidro Díaz de Mera

15 February 2019 26	Reus	0 – 1	Almería	Reus
				Stadium: Municipal
Note: Awarded a 1–0 win to every Reus' opponent after the club's exclusion from the league by the LFP.

24 February 2019 27	Almería	3 – 1	Córdoba	Almería
16:00	Corpas 28'; Juan Carlos 51'; Álvaro 59'		17' Carrillo; (yellow card) 31' Quintanilla; (yellow card) 79' Carbonell; (yellow card) 90+3' Vallejo	Stadium: Juegos Mediterráneos; Attendance: 8,620; Referee: Juan Luis Pulido Santana

3 March 2019 28	Zaragoza	1 – 2	Almería	Zaragoza
20:30	Verdasca (yellow card) 38'; Benito (yellow card) 58'; Vázquez 77'; Dorado (yellow card) 78'; Gual (yellow card) 83'; Soro (red card) 90+3'		(yellow card) 34' de la Hoz; (yellow card) 38' (goal) 83' Saveljich; 59' Álvaro; (yellow card) 64' Martos	Stadium: La Romareda; Attendance: 20,400; Referee: Santiago Varón Aceitón

9 March 2019 29	Sporting Gijón	1 – 0	Almería	Gijón
18:00	Cofie (yellow card) 21'; Đurđević (yellow card) 25'; Alegría 64'; Nacho Méndez (yellow card) 90+2'		(yellow card) 25' (yellow-red card) 90+3' Ibiza	Stadium: El Molinón; Attendance: 17,348; Referee: Dámaso Arcediano Monescillo

17 March 2019 30	Almería	0 – 0	Granada	Almería
18:00	Eteki (yellow card) 38'; Owona (yellow card) 41'		(yellow card) 31' Fede; (yellow card) 38' Víctor Díaz; (yellow card) 81' Ojeda; (yellow card) 90+3' Puertas	Stadium: Juegos Mediterráneos; Attendance: 11,532; Referee: Iñaki Bikandi Garrido

22 March 2019 31	Deportivo La Coruña	0 – 0	Almería	A Coruña
21:00	Vicente (yellow card) 44'; Cartabia (yellow card) 84'		(yellow card) 25' Saveljich; (yellow card) 52' de la Hoz; (yellow card) 82' René; (yellow card) 84' Álvaro	Stadium: Riazor; Attendance: 16,086; Referee: Daniel Jesús Trujillo Suárez

30 March 2019 32	Almería	2 – 2	Rayo Majadahonda	Almería
16:00	Rioja 30'; Owona (yellow card) 37'; Martos (yellow card) 60'; Álvaro 66'; Eteki (yellow card) 74'		(yellow card) 52' Andújar; 54' 76' Ruibal; (yellow card) 57' Fede Varela; (yellow card) 83' Carlitos	Stadium: Juegos Mediterráneos; Attendance: 6,955; Referee: Rubén Ávalos Barrera

6 April 2019 33	Extremadura	1 – 0	Almería	Almendralejo
18:00	Lolo 67' (pen.); Casto (yellow card) 90+2'		(yellow card) 66' Owona	Stadium: Francisco de la Hera; Attendance: 9,754; Referee: Juan Luis Pulido Santana

13 April 2019 34	Almería	3 – 0	Gimnàstic	Almería
18:00	Álvaro 35' 43'; Juan Carlos 51'; René (yellow card) 64'		(yellow card) 23' Noguera	Stadium: Juegos Mediterráneos; Attendance: 6,187; Referee: Víctor Areces Franco

21 April 2019 35	Tenerife	1 – 3	Almería	Santa Cruz de Tenerife
20:00	Lasso (yellow card) 17'; Jorge (yellow card) 25'; Mauro (yellow card) 45'; Dani Hernández (yellow card) 53'; Naranjo 77'; Suso (yellow card) 79'; Alberto (yellow card) 82'		3' 54' (pen.) Álvaro; (yellow card) 21' Juan Carlos; (yellow card) 45+2' Eteki; 58' Rioja; (yellow card) 90+1' Demirović	Stadium: Heliodoro Rodríguez López; Attendance: 10,385; Referee: Aitor Gorostegui Fernández-Ortega

27 April 2019 36	Almería	0 – 1	Oviedo	Almería
18:00	Chema (yellow card) 70'		(yellow card) 27' (goal) 49' Tejera; (yellow card) 42' Bárcenas; (yellow card) 72' Berjón; (yellow card) 85' Joselu	Stadium: Juegos Mediterráneos; Attendance: 7,978; Referee: Gorka Sagués Oscoz

5 May 2019 37	Lugo	4 – 2	Almería	Lugo
12:00	Valentín 19'; Barreiro 42'; Herrera 53'; Juan Carlos (yellow card) 66'; Lazo 85'		40' Álvaro; (yellow card) 76' Owona; 81' Caballero	Stadium: Anxo Carro; Attendance: 4,667; Referee: Saúl Ais Reig

12 May 2019 38	Almería	5 – 3	Elche	Almería
12:00	Álvaro 15' 43' 45+2' (pen.); Juan Carlos 59'; Aguza (yellow card) 85' (goal) 90+1'		3' (pen.) (yellow card) 37' Gil; 9' (yellow card) 45+1' Nino; (yellow card) 15' Villar; (yellow card) 46' Manuel; (yellow card) 67' Gonzalo; 69' Iván Sánchez	Stadium: Juegos Mediterráneos; Attendance: 5,127; Referee: David Pérez Pallas

19 May 2019 39	Mallorca	1 – 0	Almería	Palma
12:00	Pedraza (yellow card) 23'; Raíllo (yellow card) 66'; Sevilla 75'		(yellow card) 8' Rioja; (yellow card) 21' (red card) 90+5' Saveljich; (yellow card) 30' (yellow-red card) 55' Montoro; (yellow card) 90+2' (yellow-red card) 90+3' Aguza	Stadium: Son Moix; Attendance: 9,645; Referee: José Antonio López Toca

26 May 2019 40	Almería	0 – 0	Alcorcón	Almería
12:00	Eteki (yellow card) 5'; Álvaro (yellow card) 8'; Juan Carlos (yellow card) 81'		(penalty missed) 9' Muñoz; (yellow card) 34' Laure; (yellow card) 80' (yellow-red card) 85' Bellvís; (yellow card) 90+4' Relu	Stadium: Juegos Mediterráneos; Attendance: 4,286; Referee: Santiago Varón Aceitón

2 June 2019 41	Las Palmas	0 – 0	Almería	Las Palmas
18:00	Fabio (yellow card) 40'; Lemos (yellow card) 78'; Araujo (yellow card) 90+1'	Report	(yellow card) 56' Corpas	Stadium: Gran Canaria; Attendance: 7,288; Referee: Valentín Pizarro Gómez

9 June 2019 42	Almería	3 – 0	Albacete	Almería
20:30	Álvaro 63' (pen.) 73'; Caballero 90+1'	Report	(yellow card) 17' Moreno; (yellow card) 85' Peña	Stadium: Juegos Mediterráneos; Attendance: 4,436; Referee: Aitor Gorostegui Fernández Ortega

=== Copa del Rey ===
11 September 2018 2nd round	Málaga	1 – 2	Almería	Málaga
18:45	Héctor 45+1' (pen.); Lacen (yellow card) 54'; Juankar (yellow card) 58'; Boulahroud (yellow card) 61'		(yellow card) 45+1' Corpas; (yellow card) 53' Martos; (penalty missed) 65' 65' (yellow card) 90+3' Sekou; 78' (yellow card) 89' Montoro; (yellow card) 85' Rioja; (yellow card) 90+6' Aguza	Stadium: La Rosaleda; Attendance: 13,036; Referee: Aitor Gorostegui Fernández Ortega

18 October 2018 3rd round	Almería	3 – 1	Reus	Almería
21:00	Montoro (yellow card) 23'; Sergio Pérez 31' (yellow card) 69'; Aguza (yellow card) 67' (goal) 73'; Arzura (yellow card) 81'; Rioja 90+3'		(yellow card) 35' Catena; (yellow card) 61' Arjona; (yellow card) 73' (goal) 90+1' Linares	Stadium: Juegos Mediterráneos; Attendance: 3,504; Referee: Valentín Pizarro Gómez

==== Round of 32 ====
1 November 2018 First leg	Almería	3 – 3	Villarreal	Almería
	Trujillo (yellow card) 23'; Chema 52' (pen.); Sekou 86' 90+1'; Eteki (yellow card) 90+4'		(yellow card) 49' Mario; 67' Cazorla; 78' (o.g.) Callejón; 83' Chukwueze	Stadium: Juegos Mediterráneos; Attendance: 8,004; Referee: Javier Alberola Rojas

5 December 2018 Second leg	Villarreal	8 – 0 (11 – 3 agg.)	Almería	Villarreal
20:30	Ekambi 23' 30' 36' 47'; Bacca 45+2' 83' (pen.); Gerard 67'; Raba 89'	Report	(yellow card) 40' Montoro; (yellow card) 81' Arzura	Stadium: Estadio de la Cerámica; Attendance: 12,739; Referee: Pablo González Fuertes
