= 2018–19 Copa del Rey =

Tournament details
- Country: Spain
- Date: 5 September 2018 – 25 May 2019
- Teams: 83

Final positions
- Champions: Valencia (8th title)
- Runners-up: Barcelona

Tournament statistics
- Matches played: 112
- Goals scored: 293 (2.62 per match)
- Top goal scorer(s): Ángel; Karl Toko Ekambi (5 goals each)

The 2018–19 Copa del Rey was the 117th staging of the Copa del Rey (including two seasons where two rival editions were played). The winners were assured a place in the 2019–20 UEFA Europa League group stage, and both they and the runners-up automatically qualified for the four-team 2020 Supercopa de España.

Barcelona entered the competition as four-time defending champions in an attempt to conquer an unprecedented fifth consecutive title. The Catalans reached the final for the sixth time in a row, but were beaten by Valencia 2–1 who achieved their eighth title overall and the first since 2008.

== Schedule and format ==
| Round | Draw date | Date | Fixtures | Clubs | Format details |
|---|---|---|---|---|---|
| First round | 30 July 2018 | 5 September 2018 | 18 | 83 → 65 | New entries: Clubs participating in Tercera and Segunda División B gained entry. Byes: Five teams from Segunda División B/Tercera received a bye. Opponents seeding: Teams faced each other according to proximity criteria. Local team seeding: Draw of lots. Knock-out tournament type: Single match Copa Federación qualification: losers qualified for Copa Federación, National phase. |
| Second round | 30 July 2018 | 12 September 2018 | 22 | 65 → 43 | New entries: Clubs participating in Segunda División gained entry. Byes: One team from Segunda División B or Tercera received a bye. Opponents seeding: 22 Segunda División teams faced each other. Local team seeding: Draw of lots. Knock-out tournament type: Single match |
| Third round | 14 September 2018 | 17 October 2018 | 11 | 43 → 32 | Byes: One Segunda División team received a bye. Opponents seeding: Ten Segunda División teams faced each other. Local team seeding: Draw of lots. Knock-out tournament type: Single match |
| Round of 32 | 19 October 2018 | 31 October 2018 | 16 | 32 → 16 | New entries: Clubs participating in La Liga gained entry. Opponents seeding: The seven teams from La Liga which qualified for 2018–19 UEFA competitions, faced the remaining six teams from Segunda División B and Tercera División and one Segunda División Team. The other five Segunda División teams played against La Liga teams. The eight remaining La Liga teams faced each other. Local team seeding: First leg at home of team in lower division. Knock-out tournament type: Double match |
| Round of 32 | 19 October 2018 | 5 December 2018 | 16 | 32 → 16 | New entries: Clubs participating in La Liga gained entry. Opponents seeding: The seven teams from La Liga which qualified for 2018–19 UEFA competitions, faced the remaining six teams from Segunda División B and Tercera División and one Segunda División Team. The other five Segunda División teams played against La Liga teams. The eight remaining La Liga teams faced each other. Local team seeding: First leg at home of team in lower division. Knock-out tournament type: Double match |
| Round of 16 | 13 December 2018 | 9 January 2019 | 8 | 16 → 8 | Opponents seeding: Draw of lots. Local team seeding: First leg at home of the team in the lower division. Knock-out tournament type: Double match |
| Round of 16 | 13 December 2018 | 16 January 2019 | 8 | 16 → 8 | Opponents seeding: Draw of lots. Local team seeding: First leg at home of the team in the lower division. Knock-out tournament type: Double match |
| Quarter-finals | 18 January 2019 | 23 January 2019 | 4 | 8 → 4 | Opponents seeding: Draw of lots. Local team seeding: Luck of the draw. Knock-out tournament type: Double match |
| Quarter-finals | 18 January 2019 | 30 January 2019 | 4 | 8 → 4 | Opponents seeding: Draw of lots. Local team seeding: Luck of the draw. Knock-out tournament type: Double match |
| Semi-finals | 1 February 2019 | 6 February 2019 | 2 | 4 → 2 | Opponents seeding: Draw of lots. Local team seeding: Luck of the draw. Knock-out tournament type: Double match |
| Semi-finals | 1 February 2019 | 27 February 2019 | 2 | 4 → 2 | Opponents seeding: Draw of lots. Local team seeding: Luck of the draw. Knock-out tournament type: Double match |
| Final | 1 February 2019 | 25 May 2019 | 1 | 2 → 1 | Single match at the Estadio Benito Villamarín in Seville. Both teams qualified for the 2020 Supercopa de España. UEFA Europa League qualification: winners qualified for the 2019–20 UEFA Europa League group stage. |

Notes

- Double-match rounds enforced the away goals rule, single-match rounds did not.
- Single-match rounds ending in a tie were decided in extra time, and if still level, by a penalty shoot-out.

== Qualified teams ==
The following teams qualified for the competition. Reserve teams were excluded.

| La Liga the 20 teams of the 2017–18 season | Segunda División the 20 non-reserve teams of the 2017–18 season | Segunda División B the top five non-reserve teams of each group and the five with the highest number of points 2017–18 season excluding reserve teams | Tercera División the best non-reserve team of each one of the 18 groups of the 2017–18 season |
| Alavés; Athletic Bilbao; Atlético Madrid; Barcelona; Celta Vigo; Deportivo La Coruña; Eibar; Espanyol; Getafe; Girona; Las Palmas; Leganés; Levante; Málaga; Real Betis; Real Madrid; Real Sociedad; Sevilla; Valencia; Villarreal | Albacete; Alcorcón; Almería; Cádiz; Córdoba; Cultural Leonesa; Gimnàstic; Granada; Huesca; Lorca FC; Lugo; Numancia; Osasuna; Oviedo; Rayo Vallecano; Reus; Sporting Gijón; Tenerife; Valladolid; Zaragoza | Badalona; Barakaldo; Cartagena; Cornellà; Ebro; Elche; Extremadura; Fuenlabrada; Gernika; Lleida Esportiu; Mallorca; Marbella; Melilla; Mirandés; Murcia; Navalcarnero; Ontinyent; Racing Santander; Rápido de Bouzas; Rayo Majadahonda; Talavera de la Reina; Tudelano; UCAM Murcia; UD Logroñés; Villanovense | Calahorra; Castellón; Ceuta; Compostela; Conquense; Cultural Durango; Don Benito; Gimnástica Torrelavega; Internacional; Jaén; Langreo; Mensajero; Mutilvera; Poblense; Sant Andreu; Teruel; Unionistas; Yeclano |

== First round ==
41 teams entered the competition at this round. Five Segunda B or Tercera División teams that in the previous season did not play in Tercera División received a bye. The rest were paired according to proximity criteria.

Due to the breach of the competition rules, giving byes to unauthorised teams, the draw of the first and second round had to be partially repeated.

| Group I | Group II | Group III | Group IV |
|---|---|---|---|
| Fuenlabrada; Navalcarnero; Internacional; Rápido de Bouzas; Unionistas; Cultural Leonesa; Compostela; Mensajero | Mirandés; Langreo; Racing Santander; Gimnástica Torrelavega; Barakaldo; Cultural Durango; Gernika; Calahorra; Tudelano; UD Logroñés; Mutilvera | Lleida Esportiu; Badalona; Cornellà; Castellón; Ontinyent; Teruel; Ebro; Conquense; Sant Andreu; Poblense | Talavera de la Reina; Melilla; Marbella; Cartagena; Murcia; Lorca FC; UCAM Murcia; Don Benito; Villanovense; Jaén; Ceuta; Yeclano |

During the draw, Villanovense, Murcia, Badalona, Tudelano and Lorca FC received a bye to the second round.

| 5 September 2018 | Mensajero (4) | 0–3 | Compostela (4) | Santa Cruz de La Palma |
| 18:30 | | Report | Aythami 47'; Camacho 66' (o.g.); Miki 88' | Stadium: Silvestre Carrillo; Referee: Miguel Ángel Ortiz Arias |

| 5 September 2018 | Poblense (4) | 1–4 | Ontinyent (3) | Sa Pobla |
| 19:00 | Calonge 58' | Report | David Torres 17', 52', 53'; Soler 90' | Stadium: Nou Camp; Referee: Albert Catalán Ferrán |

| 5 September 2018 | Rápido de Bouzas (3) | 0–4 | Unionistas (3) | Bouzas, Vigo |
| 20:00 | | Report | Isaac Manjón 3', 80'; Iago 12' (o.g.); De la Nava 90' | Stadium: Baltasar Pujales; Referee: Leandro Carbajales Gómez |

| 5 September 2018 | Internacional (3) | 2–2 (a.e.t.) (4–5 p) | Fuenlabrada (3) | Boadilla del Monte |
| 20:00 | Ramos 33'; Pina 61' | Report | Hugo Fraile 80' (pen.); Randy 90+1' | Stadium: Polideportivo Municipal; Referee: Alfonso Vicente Moral |
| | Penalties |
| | Muñiz (penalty scored); Ramos (penalty scored); Robles (penalty scored); Rico (penalty scored); Alvar Herrero (penalty missed) | | (penalty scored) Hugo Fraile; (penalty scored) Javi Gómez; (penalty scored) Cristóbal; (penalty scored) Randy; (penalty scored) De Miguel |

| 5 September 2018 | Navalcarnero (3) | 0–2 | Cultural Leonesa (3) | Navalcarnero |
| 20:00 | | Report | Aridane 32'; Yeray 35' | Stadium: Mariano González; Referee: Antonio Alberola Rojas |

| 5 September 2018 | Langreo (3) | 1–2 | UD Logroñés (3) | La Felguera, Langreo |
| 20:00 | Sergio Ríos 79' (pen.) | Report | Maranhão 14', 77' | Stadium: Ganzábal; Attendance: 715; Referee: Rubén Eiriz Mata |

| 5 September 2018 | Gernika (3) | 1–0 | Cultural Durango (3) | Gernika |
| 20:00 | Gorka 90' | Report | | Stadium: Urbieta; Referee: Julio Fermín Leo Ollo |

| 5 September 2018 | Castellón (3) | 1–0 | Conquense (3) | Castellón de la Plana |
| 20:00 | Hicham 60' | Report | | Stadium: Castalia; Referee: Óscar Sauleda Torrent |

| 5 September 2018 | Lleida Esportiu (3) | 2–0 | Teruel (3) | Lleida |
| 20:00 | Bandeh 42'; Alpha 87' | Report | | Stadium: Camp d'Esports; Referee: Miguel Bosch Domènech |

| 5 September 2018 | UCAM Murcia (3) | 2–0 | Ceuta (4) | Murcia |
| 20:00 | Adán 77'; Titi 79' | Report | | Stadium: La Condomina; Attendance: 1,190; Referee: Juan Manuel Ruiz Aguilera |

| 5 September 2018 | Barakaldo (3) | 1–1 (a.e.t.) (3–4 p) | Mutilvera (4) | Barakaldo |
| 20:15 | Dopi 106' | Report | Ayensa 111' | Stadium: Lasesarre; Referee: Alberto Fuente Martín |
| | Penalties |
| | Picón (penalty scored); Dopi (penalty scored); Antonio Sánchez (penalty missed); Toro (penalty scored); Fran García (penalty missed); Erik Ruiz (penalty missed) | | (penalty missed) Eztieder; (penalty scored) Losantos; (penalty scored) Imanol; (penalty scored) Ayensa; (penalty missed) Briñol; (penalty scored) Adrián Alfonso |

| 5 September 2018 | Mirandés (3) | 0–1 | Racing Santander (3) | Miranda de Ebro |
| 20:30 | | Report | Rivero 83' | Stadium: Anduva; Attendance: 2,559; Referee: Aimar Velasco Arbaiza |

| 5 September 2018 | Calahorra (3) | 1–1 (a.e.t.) (4–2 p) | Gimnástica Torrelavega (3) | Calahorra |
| 20:30 | Javi Barrio 3' | Report | Nacho Rodríguez 58' | Stadium: La Planilla; Referee: Sergio Usón Rosel |
| | Penalties |
| | Parla (penalty scored); Barrón (penalty scored); Auzmendi (penalty missed); Gabri Ortega (penalty scored); Sanz (penalty scored) | | (penalty missed) Luis Alberto; (penalty scored) Vitienes; (penalty scored) Cusi; (penalty missed) Borja Camus |

| 5 September 2018 | Cornellà (3) | 1–1 (a.e.t.) (2–3 p) | Sant Andreu (4) | Cornellà de Llobregat |
| 20:30 | Eloy 67' | Report | Felipe Sá 82' | Stadium: Nou Camp Municipal; Referee: Pedro Sureda Cuenca |
| | Penalties |
| | José Gaspar (penalty missed); Leo Rodríguez (penalty missed); Agus Medina (penalty missed); Goldar (penalty scored); Mara (penalty scored); Manu Torres (penalty missed) | | (penalty missed) Felipe Sá; (penalty scored) Ton Alcover; (penalty scored) Carlos; (penalty missed) Bandeh; (penalty missed) Ferran Jutglà; (penalty scored) Noguera |

| 5 September 2018 | Yeclano (4) | 1–2 (a.e.t.) | Melilla (3) | Yecla |
| 20:30 | Iker Torre 81' | Report | Yacine 60'; Chino 116' (o.g.) | Stadium: La Constitución; Referee: Carlos Alberto Carbonell Hernández |

| 5 September 2018 | Marbella (3) | 0–1 | Ebro (3) | Marbella |
| 20:30 | | Report | Dani Martínez 41' | Stadium: Municipal; Referee: José Joaquín Gallego Gambín |

| 5 September 2018 | Don Benito (3) | 0–1 | Cartagena (3) | Don Benito |
| 20:45 | | Report | Rubén Cruz 65' | Stadium: Vicente Sanz; Referee: Juan Peña Varela |

| 5 September 2018 | Talavera de la Reina (3) | 2–2 (a.e.t.) (3–4 p) | Jaén (4) | Talavera de la Reina |
| 20:45 | Cristian 84'; Madrigal 90' | Report | Raúl García 22'; Montes 40' | Stadium: El Prado; Referee: Guillermo Conejero Sánchez |
| | Penalties |
| | Madrigal (penalty scored); Óscar Martín (penalty scored); Oca (penalty scored); Molinero (penalty missed); Espinar (penalty missed); Cristian (penalty missed) | | (penalty missed) Juanma; (penalty scored) Cervera; (penalty scored) Antonio López; (penalty scored) Jorge Vela; (penalty missed) Juanca González; (penalty scored) Fragoso |

== Second round ==
The 22 Segunda División teams entered the competition in this round and were joined by the winners of the previous stage, except for Mutilvera, who received a bye to the third round. Segunda División teams were drawn against each other.

| 11 September 2018 | Málaga (2) | 1–2 | Almería (2) | Málaga |
| 18:45 | Héctor Hernández 45' (pen.) | Report | Sekou 65'; Montoro 78' | Stadium: La Rosaleda; Attendance: 13,036; Referee: Aitor Gorostegui Fernández-Ortega |

| 11 September 2018 | Mallorca (2) | 1–0 | Oviedo (2) | Palma de Mallorca |
| 18:45 | Giner 58' | Report | | Stadium: Son Moix; Attendance: 5,582; Referee: Iñaki Vicandi Garrido |

| 12 September 2018 | Ebro (3) | 0–0 (a.e.t.) (5–4 p) | Murcia (3) | Zaragoza |
| 18:00 | | Report | | Stadium: La Almozara; Referee: David López Jiménez |

| 12 September 2018 | Ontinyent (3) | 1–1 (a.e.t.) (6–5 p) | Jaén (4) | Ontinyent |
| 19:30 | Zarzo 49' (pen.) | Report | Armero 39' | Stadium: El Clariano; Referee: Salvador Lax Franco |

| 12 September 2018 | Lleida Esportiu (3) | 1–0 | Compostela (4) | Lleida |
| 20:00 | Ortuño 39' | Report | | Stadium: Camp d'Esports; Referee: Daniel David Baiges Dones |

| 12 September 2018 | UCAM Murcia (3) | 0–2 | Racing Santander (3) | Murcia |
| 20:00 | | | Lucas 15'; Castañeda 90' | Stadium: La Condomina; Referee: Rubén Ruipérez Marín |

| 12 September 2018 | Osasuna (2) | 1–2 | Reus (2) | Pamplona |
| 20:00 | Clerc 87' | Report | Carbià 60'; Juan Domínguez 68' | Stadium: El Sadar; Attendance: 10,987; Referee: César Soto Grado |

| 12 September 2018 | Alcorcón (2) | 1–0 | Extremadura (2) | Alcorcón |
| 20:00 | Juan Muñoz 49' | Report | | Stadium: Santo Domingo; Attendance: 2,208; Referee: Luis Marro Milla Alvendiz |

| 12 September 2018 | Cultural Leonesa (3) | 1–1 (a.e.t.) (5–4 p) | Fuenlabrada (3) | León |
| 20:30 | Aridane 65' | Report | Gassama 53' | Stadium: Reino de León; Referee: José Antonio Fernández Rodríguez |

| 12 September 2018 | Sant Andreu (4) | 1–0 (a.e.t.) | Gernika (3) | Barcelona |
| 20:30 | Alcover 116' (pen.) | Report | | Stadium: Narcís Sala; Referee: Sebastián Ripoll Solano |

| 12 September 2018 | Calahorra (3) | 2–0 | Castellón (3) | Calahorra |
| 20:30 | Ubis 41', 48' | Report | | Stadium: La Planilla; Referee: Ibai Rezola Etxeberria |

| 12 September 2018 | Villanovense (3) | 2–1 | Badalona (3) | Villanueva de la Serena |
| 20:45 | Raíllo 42'; Xiscu 72' | Report | Magallán 39' | Stadium: Villanovense; Referee: Alberto González Hernández |

| 12 September 2018 | Melilla (3) | 3–0 | Tudelano (3) | Melilla |
| 20:45 | Óscar 21'; Menudo 56', 90+3' | Report | | Stadium: Álvarez Claro; Referee: José Caucelo Sace |

| 12 September 2018 | Lorca FC (4) | 2–1 (a.e.t.) | Unionistas (3) | Lorca |
| 20:45 | Andrés 41'; Cifuentes 117' | Report | Guille 32' | Stadium: Francisco Artés Carrasco; Referee: José Luis Guzmán Mansilla |

| 12 September 2018 | Cartagena (3) | 1–1 (a.e.t.) (4–5 p) | UD Logroñés (3) | Cartagena |
| 21:00 | Rubén Cruz 11' | Report | Rayco 72' | Stadium: Cartagonova; Referee: Julio Mena Gimeno |

| 12 September 2018 | Zaragoza (2) | 2–1 | Deportivo La Coruña (2) | Zaragoza |
| 21:00 | Papunashvili 6'; Pombo 50' | Report | Fede Cartabia 53' | Stadium: La Romareda; Attendance: 18,429; Referee: Daniel Jesús Trujillo Suárez |

| 12 September 2018 | Tenerife (2) | 1–2 | Cádiz (2) | Santa Cruz de Tenerife |
| 22:00 | Carlos Ruiz 88' | Report | Dani Romera 5'; Manu Vallejo 92' | Stadium: Heliodoro Rodríguez López; Attendance: 8,777; Referee: Óliver de la Fuente Ramos |

| 12 September 2018 | Córdoba (2) | 2–0 | Gimnàstic (2) | Córdoba |
| 22:00 | Andrés Martín 4'; Piovaccari 90+2' | Report | | Stadium: Nuevo Arcángel; Attendance: 6,935; Referee: Dámaso Arcediano Monescillo |

| 13 September 2018 | Numancia (2) | 1–2 | Sporting Gijón (2) | Soria |
| 20:00 | Marcos Isla 52' | Report | Higinio 28' (o.g.); Morilla 31' | Stadium: Los Pajaritos; Attendance: 2,853; Referee: Daniel Ocón Arraiz |

| 13 September 2018 | Albacete (2) | 2–3 | Lugo (2) | Albacete |
| 20:00 | Ortuño 11'; Manaj 90+3' | Report | Lazo 2'; Chus Herrero 35' (o.g.); Juan Muñiz 61' | Stadium: Carlos Belmonte; Attendance: 4,839; Referee: Santiago Varón Aceitón |

| 13 September 2018 | Las Palmas (2) | 1–2 | Rayo Majadahonda (2) | Las Palmas |
| 22:00 (21:00 UTC+1) | Mesa 3' | Report | Fede Varela 40'; Iza 78' (pen.) | Stadium: Gran Canaria; Attendance: 6,934; Referee: Javier Iglesias Villanueva |

| 13 September 2018 | Elche (2) | 2–1 | Granada (2) | Elche |
| 22:00 | Jony 41' (pen.); Provencio 68' | Report | Pablo Vázquez 81' | Stadium: Manuel Martínez Valero; Attendance: 5,409; Referee: Gorka Sagués Oscoz |

== Third round ==
The Segunda División teams faced each other, except for Mallorca, who received a bye to the round of 32.

| 16 October 2018 | Elche (2) | 1–4 | Córdoba (2) | Elche |
| 20:00 | Villar 90' | Report | De las Cuevas 26'; Luis Muñoz 30'; Javi Galán 61'; Sebas 82' | Stadium: Manuel Martínez Valero; Attendance: 5,301; Referee: Isidro Díaz de Mera Escuderos |

| 17 October 2018 | Ebro (3) | 2–1 | Lleida Esportiu (3) | Zaragoza |
| 17:00 | Ubay 72' (pen.); Cortés 82' | Report | Albistegi 44' | Stadium: La Almozara; Referee: Iván Muñoz Pérez |

| 17 October 2018 | Lugo (2) | 1–0 | Alcorcón (2) | Lugo |
| 20:00 | Escriche 90+2' | Report | | Stadium: Anxo Carro; Attendance: 2,053; Referee: Jorge Figueroa Vázquez |

| 17 October 2018 | Mutilvera (4) | 1–3 | Villanovense (3) | Mutilva, Aranguren |
| 20:15 | Losantos 35' | Report | Pajuelo 14'; Poley 50'; Leandro 90+2' | Stadium: Valle Aranguren; Referee: Alejandro Sánchez Alba |

| 17 October 2018 | Sant Andreu (4) | 1–0 (a.e.t.) | Calahorra (3) | Barcelona |
| 20:30 | Kuku 95' | | | Stadium: Narcís Sala; Referee: Iván González González |

| 17 October 2018 | Racing Santander (3) | 1–0 | UD Logroñés (3) | Santander |
| 20:30 | Rivero 90+3' (pen.) | Report | | Stadium: El Sardinero; Attendance: 8,439; Referee: Pablo Fernández Pérez |

| 17 October 2018 | Melilla (3) | 2–0 | Ontinyent (3) | Melilla |
| 20:45 | Aguza 84'; Ruano 90+3' | | | Stadium: Álvarez Claro; Referee: Francisco Sáez Vital |

| 17 October 2018 | Lorca FC (4) | 0–3 | Cultural Leonesa (3) | Lorca |
| 20:45 | | | Hugo 18'; Aridane 65'; Mancebo 90+1' | Stadium: Francisco Artés Carrasco; Referee: Luis Collado López |

| 17 October 2018 | Zaragoza (2) | 0–1 | Cádiz (2) | Zaragoza |
| 21:00 | | Report | Manu Vallejo 56' | Stadium: La Romareda; Attendance: 12,946 |

| 18 October 2018 | Rayo Majadahonda (2) | 1–1 (a.e.t.) (3–4 p) | Sporting Gijón (2) | Madrid |
| 20:00 | Aitor Ruibal 90' | Report | Manzambi 23' | Stadium: Wanda Metropolitano; Attendance: 2,156; Referee: David Pérez Pallas |
| | Penalties |
| | Galán (penalty scored); Enzo (penalty missed); Fede Varela (penalty missed); Jeisson (penalty scored); Iza (penalty scored); Schiappacasse (penalty missed) | | (penalty missed) Pedro Díaz; (penalty scored) Javi Noblejas; (penalty scored) Isma Cerro; (penalty scored) Morilla; (penalty missed) Manzambi; (penalty scored) Nacho Méndez |

| 18 October 2018 | Almería (2) | 3–1 | Reus (2) | Almería |
| 21:00 | Sergio Pérez 31'; Aguza 73'; Luis Rioja 90+3' | Report | Linares 90+1' | Stadium: Mediterráneo; Attendance: 3,504; Referee: Valentín Pizarro Gómez |

== Final phase ==
The draw for the Round of 32 was held on 19 October 2018 at La Ciudad del Fútbol, Las Rozas de Madrid. In this round, all La Liga teams entered the competition.

Round of 32 pairings were as follows: the six remaining teams participating in the 2018–19 Segunda División B and Tercera División faced the four 2018–19 La Liga teams which qualified for the UEFA Champions League and two of the three teams which qualified for the Europa League. The six remaining teams participating in Segunda División faced the last Europa League team not drawn previously and other La Liga teams. The remaining teams faced each other. In matches involving teams from different league tiers, the team in the lower tier played the first leg at home. This rule was also applied in the Round of 16, but not for the quarter-finals and semi-finals, in which the order of legs was based on the luck of the draw.

| Pot 1 Segunda B and Tercera División | Pot 2 European competitions | Pot 3 Segunda División | Pot 4 Rest of Primera División |
|---|---|---|---|
| Cultural Leonesa; Ebro; Melilla; Racing Santander; Sant Andreu; Villanovense | Champions League: Atlético Madrid; Barcelona (TH); Real Madrid; Valencia Europa League: Real Betis; Sevilla; Villarreal | Almería; Cádiz; Córdoba; Lugo; Mallorca; Sporting Gijón | Alavés; Athletic; Celta Vigo; Eibar; Espanyol; Getafe; Girona; Huesca; Leganés; Levante; Rayo Vallecano; Real Sociedad; Valladolid |

=== Bracket ===
Round of 32
Athletic Bilbao | 4 | 4 | 8
Huesca | 0 | 0 | 0
Villanovense | 0 | 0 | 0
Sevilla | 0 | 1 | 1
Lugo | 1 | 0 | 1
Levante | 1 | 2 | 3
Cultural Leonesa | 0 | 1 | 1
Barcelona | 1 | 4 | 5
Melilla | 0 | 1 | 1
Real Madrid | 4 | 6 | 10
Leganés | 2 | 1 | 3
Rayo Vallecano | 2 | 0 | 2
Alavés | 2 | 1 | 3
Girona | 2 | 2 | 4
Sant Andreu | 0 | 0 | 0
Atlético Madrid | 1 | 4 | 5
Almería | 3 | 0 | 3
Villarreal | 3 | 8 | 11
Cádiz | 2 | 0 | 2
Espanyol (a) | 1 | 1 | 2
Racing Santander | 0 | 0 | 0
Real Betis | 1 | 4 | 5
Celta Vigo | 1 | 0 | 1
Real Sociedad | 1 | 2 | 3
Córdoba | 1 | 1 | 2
Getafe | 2 | 5 | 7
Mallorca | 1 | 1 | 2
Valladolid | 2 | 2 | 4
Sporting Gijón | 2 | 2 | 4
Eibar | 0 | 2 | 2
Ebro | 1 | 0 | 1
Valencia | 2 | 1 | 3

Round of 16
Athletic Bilbao | 1 | 1 | 2
Sevilla | 3 | 0 | 3
Levante | 2 | 0 | 2
Barcelona | 1 | 3 | 4
Real Madrid | 3 | 0 | 3
Leganés | 0 | 1 | 1
Girona (a) | 1 | 3 | 4
Atlético Madrid | 1 | 3 | 4
Villarreal | 2 | 1 | 3
Espanyol | 2 | 3 | 5
Real Betis (a) | 0 | 2 | 2
Real Sociedad | 0 | 2 | 2
Getafe | 1 | 1 | 2
Valladolid | 0 | 1 | 1
Sporting Gijón | 2 | 0 | 2
Valencia | 1 | 3 | 4

Quarter-finals
Sevilla | 2 | 1 | 3
Barcelona | 0 | 6 | 6
Real Madrid | 4 | 3 | 7
Girona | 2 | 1 | 3
Espanyol | 1 | 1 | 2
Real Betis (a.e.t.) | 1 | 3 | 4
Getafe | 1 | 1 | 2
Valencia | 0 | 3 | 3

Semi-finals
Barcelona | 1 | 3 | 4
Real Madrid | 1 | 0 | 1
Real Betis | 2 | 0 | 2
Valencia | 2 | 1 | 3

Final
Barcelona | 1
Valencia | 2

== Round of 32 ==
The draw for the round of 32 took place on 19 October at La Ciudad del Fútbol, in Las Rozas de Madrid. On 23 October, the RFEF designated the referees for first leg matches. All first leg matches were scheduled to be played between 30 October and 1 November; however, the match between Athletic Bilbao and Huesca had to be postponed because of the preparations for an MTV concert in San Mamés. On 8 November, the RFEF made public the schedules for the second leg, scheduled to be played between 4 and 6 December.

Sant Andreu, from Tercera División (fourth tier), was the lowest-ranked team still in the competition.

| Team 1 | Agg. | Team 2 | 1st leg | 2nd leg |
|---|---|---|---|---|
| Cultural Leonesa (3) | 1–5 | Barcelona (1) | 0–1 | 1–4 |
| Ebro (3) | 1–3 | Valencia (1) | 1–2 | 0–1 |
| Sant Andreu (4) | 0–5 | Atlético Madrid (1) | 0–1 | 0–4 |
| Melilla (3) | 1–10 | Real Madrid (1) | 0–4 | 1–6 |
| Villanovense (3) | 0–1 | Sevilla (1) | 0–0 | 0–1 |
| Racing Santander (3) | 0–5 | Real Betis (1) | 0–1 | 0–4 |
| Almería (2) | 3–11 | Villarreal (1) | 3–3 | 0–8 |
| Mallorca (2) | 2–4 | Valladolid (1) | 1–2 | 1–2 |
| Cádiz (2) | 2–2 (a) | Espanyol (1) | 2–1 | 0–1 |
| Sporting Gijón (2) | 4–2 | Eibar (1) | 2–0 | 2–2 |
| Lugo (2) | 1–3 | Levante (1) | 1–1 | 0–2 |
| Córdoba (2) | 2–7 | Getafe (1) | 1–2 | 1–5 |
| Athletic Bilbao (1) | 8–0 | Huesca (1) | 4–0 | 4–0 |
| Alavés (1) | 3–4 | Girona (1) | 2–2 | 1–2 |
| Leganés (1) | 3–2 | Rayo Vallecano (1) | 2–2 | 1–0 |
| Celta Vigo (1) | 1–3 | Real Sociedad (1) | 1–1 | 0–2 |

=== First leg ===
| 30 October 2018 | Ebro | 1–2 | Valencia | Zaragoza (Note: Ebro played their home match at La Romareda, the home stadium of Zaragoza, instead of their regular stadium La Almozara, in the same city, due to its low capacity.) |
| 19:30 CET | Amelibia 62' | Report | Mina 71', 80' | Stadium: La Romareda; Attendance: 9,911; Referee: Xavier Estrada Fernández |

| 30 October 2018 | Lugo | 1–1 | Levante | Lugo |
| 19:30 CET | Herrera 11' | Report | Mayoral 53' | Stadium: Anxo Carro; Attendance: 2,389; Referee: Pablo González Fuertes |

| 30 October 2018 | Leganés | 2–2 | Rayo Vallecano | Leganés |
| 20:30 CET | En-Nesyri 31', 72' | Report | Medrán 15'; Alegría 21' | Stadium: Butarque; Attendance: 5,872; Referee: Alberto Undiano Mallenco |

| 30 October 2018 | Sant Andreu | 0–1 | Atlético Madrid | Barcelona |
| 21:30 CET | | Report | Martins 33' | Stadium: Narcís Sala; Attendance: 5,995; Referee: Jesús Gil Manzano |

| 31 October 2018 | Melilla | 0–4 | Real Madrid | Melilla |
| 19:30 CET | | Report | Benzema 28'; Asensio 45+1'; Odriozola 79'; Cristo 90+2' | Stadium: Álvarez Claro; Attendance: 7,212; Referee: Ricardo de Burgos Bengoetxea |

| 31 October 2018 | Mallorca | 1–2 | Valladolid | Palma |
| 20:30 CET | Buenacasa 67' | Report | Verde 8', 35' | Stadium: Son Moix; Attendance: 3,121; Referee: David Medié Jiménez |

| 31 October 2018 | Córdoba | 1–2 | Getafe | Córdoba |
| 20:30 CET | Bruno 26' (o.g.) | Report | Mata 45' (pen.), 90' | Stadium: Nuevo Arcángel; Attendance: 4,129; Referee: Guillermo Cuadra Fernández |

| 31 October 2018 | Alavés | 2–2 | Girona | Vitoria-Gasteiz |
| 20:30 CET | Sobrino 63'; Martín 88' | Report | Alcalá 18'; Montes 90+6' | Stadium: Mendizorrotza; Attendance: 9,346; Referee: Adrián Cordero Vega |

| 31 October 2018 | Cultural Leonesa | 0–1 | Barcelona | León |
| 21:30 CET | | Report | Lenglet 90+1' | Stadium: Reino de León; Attendance: 10,873; Referee: Mario Melero López |

| 1 November 2018 | Sporting Gijón | 2–0 | Eibar | Gijón |
| 12:00 CET | Đurđević 54'; Manzambi 86' | Report | | Stadium: El Molinón; Attendance: 12,902; Referee: Santiago Jaime Latre |

| 1 November 2018 | Villanovense | 0–0 | Sevilla | Villanueva de la Serena |
| 16:15 CET | | Report | | Stadium: Municipal Villanovense; Attendance: 7,145; Referee: Ignacio Iglesias Villanueva |

| 1 November 2018 | Celta Vigo | 1–1 | Real Sociedad | Vigo |
| 16:15 CET | Aspas 58' | Report | Juanmi 89' | Stadium: Balaídos; Attendance: 15,195; Referee: José Luis Munuera Montero |

| 1 November 2018 | Almería | 3–3 | Villarreal | Almería |
| 18:30 CET | Chema 52' (pen.); Gassama 86', 90+1' | Report | Cazorla 67'; Callejón 78' (o.g.); Chukwueze 83' | Stadium: Juegos Mediterráneos; Attendance: 8,004; Referee: Javier Alberola Rojas |

| 1 November 2018 | Cádiz | 2–1 | Espanyol | Cádiz |
| 18:30 CET | Lekić 1'; Azamoum 41' | Report | Puado 36' | Stadium: Ramón de Carranza; Attendance: 11,830; Referee: Juan Martínez Munuera |

| 1 November 2018 | Racing Santander | 0–1 | Real Betis | Santander |
| 20:45 CET | | Report | León 8' (pen.) | Stadium: El Sardinero; Attendance: 17,398; Referee: Eduardo Prieto Iglesias |

| 28 November 2018 | Athletic Bilbao | 4–0 | Huesca | Bilbao |
| 20:45 CET | Aduriz 10', 32'; Insua 27' (o.g.); Beñat 55' | Report | | Stadium: San Mamés; Attendance: 25,360; Referee: José Luis González González |

=== Second leg ===
| 4 December 2018 | Valencia | 1–0 (3–1 agg.) | Ebro | Valencia |
| 19:30 CET | Batshuayi 59' | Report | | Stadium: Mestalla; Attendance: 23,272; Referee: Eduardo Prieto Iglesias |

| 4 December 2018 | Getafe | 5–1 (7–2 agg.) | Córdoba | Getafe |
| 19:30 CET | Portillo 18'; Ángel 42' (pen.), 78', 80'; Ibáñez 49' | Report | Aythami 70' | Stadium: Coliseum Alfonso Pérez; Attendance: 5,562; Referee: Juan Martínez Munuera |

| 4 December 2018 | Rayo Vallecano | 0–1 (2–3 agg.) | Leganés | Madrid |
| 20:30 CET | | Report | Velázquez 17' (o.g.) | Stadium: Campo de Fútbol de Vallecas; Attendance: 8,372; Referee: Alejandro José Hernández Hernández |

| 4 December 2018 | Espanyol | 1–0 (2–2 (a) agg.) | Cádiz | Cornellà de Llobregat |
| 21:30 CET | Pérez 76' | Report | | Stadium: RCDE Stadium; Attendance: 12,560; Referee: Ricardo de Burgos Bengoetxea |

| 5 December 2018 | Atlético Madrid | 4–0 (5–0 agg.) | Sant Andreu | Madrid |
| 19:30 CET | Lemar 48'; Kalinić 53'; Correa 55'; Vitolo 80' | Report | | Stadium: Wanda Metropolitano; Attendance: 31,414; Referee: Mario Melero López |

| 5 December 2018 | Girona | 2–1 (4–3 agg.) | Alavés | Girona |
| 19:30 CET | Granell 74'; Portu 79' | Report | Alcalá 62' (o.g.) | Stadium: Montilivi; Attendance: 9,290; Referee: Antonio Miguel Mateu Lahoz |

| 5 December 2018 | Sevilla | 1–0 (1–0 agg.) | Villanovense | Sevilla |
| 20:30 CET | Silva 49' | Report | | Stadium: Ramón Sánchez Pizjuán; Attendance: 19,908; Referee: David Medié Jiménez |

| 5 December 2018 | Villarreal | 8–0 (11–3 agg.) | Almería | Villarreal |
| 20:30 CET | Toko Ekambi 23', 30', 36', 47'; Bacca 45', 83' (pen.); Gerard 67'; Raba 89' | Report | | Stadium: Estadio de la Cerámica; Attendance: 12,739; Referee: Pablo González Fuertes |

| 5 December 2018 | Real Sociedad | 2–0 (3–1 agg.) | Celta Vigo | San Sebastián |
| 20:30 CET | Oyarzabal 10'; Januzaj 27' | Report | | Stadium: Anoeta; Attendance: 21,336; Referee: José María Sánchez Martínez |

| 5 December 2018 | Barcelona | 4–1 (5–1 agg.) | Cultural Leonesa | Barcelona |
| 21:30 CET | Munir 18'; D. Suárez 26', 70'; Malcom 43' | Report | Señé 54' | Stadium: Camp Nou; Attendance: 76,398; Referee: Alberto Undiano Mallenco |

| 5 December 2018 | Valladolid | 2–1 (4–2 agg.) | Mallorca | Valladolid |
| 21:30 CET | Plano 49'; Verde 88' | Report | Abdón 48' | Stadium: José Zorrilla; Attendance: 9,813; Referee: Adrián Cordero Vega |

| 6 December 2018 | Levante | 2–0 (3–1 agg.) | Lugo | Valencia |
| 12:00 CET | Coke 80'; Dwamena 90+3' | Report | | Stadium: Ciutat de València; Attendance: 10,805; Referee: Guillermo Cuadra Fernández |

| 6 December 2018 | Real Madrid | 6–1 (10–1 agg.) | Melilla | Madrid |
| 16:15 CET | Asensio 33', 35'; Sánchez 39'; Isco 48', 83'; Vinícius 75' | Report | Qasmi 81' (pen.) | Stadium: Santiago Bernabéu; Attendance: 55,243; Referee: Javier Alberola Rojas |

| 6 December 2018 | Eibar | 2–2 (2–4 agg.) | Sporting Gijón | Eibar |
| 18:30 CET | Cucurella 53'; Charles 87' | Report | Álvaro 13'; P. Pérez 39' | Stadium: Ipurua; Attendance: 4,970; Referee: José Luis González González |

| 6 December 2018 | Huesca | 0–4 (0–8 agg.) | Athletic Bilbao | Huesca |
| 18:30 CET | | Report | Aduriz 37', 58'; Williams 80', 90+2' | Stadium: El Alcoraz; Attendance: 5,561; Referee: Carlos del Cerro Grande |

| 6 December 2018 | Real Betis | 4–0 (5–0 agg.) | Racing Santander | Seville |
| 20:45 CET | Barragán 32'; Sanabria 59' (pen.); Sergio León 69'; Lo Celso 89' | Report | | Stadium: Benito Villamarín; Attendance: 34,732; Referee: Xavier Estrada Fernández |

== Round of 16 ==
The Round of 16 draw took place on December 13, 2018, at Ciudad del Fútbol in Las Rozas, Madrid. The first leg took place in the second week of January and the return leg the following week.

Sporting Gijón, from Segunda División, was the only remaining team that did not play in the top tier.

In this round, the video assistant referee was applied for the first time ever in the Copa del Rey.

| Team 1 | Agg. | Team 2 | 1st leg | 2nd leg |
|---|---|---|---|---|
| Real Madrid (1) | 3–1 | Leganés (1) | 3–0 | 0–1 |
| Getafe (1) | 2–1 | Valladolid (1) | 1–0 | 1–1 |
| Real Betis (1) | 2–2 (a) | Real Sociedad (1) | 0–0 | 2–2 |
| Levante (1) | 2–4 | Barcelona (1) | 2–1 | 0–3 |
| Athletic Bilbao (1) | 2–3 | Sevilla (1) | 1–3 | 1–0 |
| Sporting Gijón (2) | 2–4 | Valencia (1) | 2–1 | 0–3 |
| Girona (1) | 4–4 (a) | Atlético Madrid (1) | 1–1 | 3–3 |
| Villarreal (1) | 3–5 | Espanyol (1) | 2–2 | 1–3 |

=== First leg ===
| 8 January 2019 | Sporting Gijón | 2–1 | Valencia | Gijón |
| 21:30 CET | Noblejas 34'; Blackman 79' | Report | Gameiro 45' | Stadium: El Molinón; Attendance: 9,870; Referee: Alberto Undiano Mallenco |

| 9 January 2019 | Girona | 1–1 | Atlético Madrid | Girona |
| 19:30 CET | Lozano 34' | Report | Griezmann 9' | Stadium: Montilivi; Attendance: 7,770; Referee: Alejandro Hernández Hernández |

| 9 January 2019 | Villarreal | 2–2 | Espanyol | Villarreal |
| 20:30 CET | Toko Ekambi 85'; Bacca 89' | Report | Darder 15'; A. López 71' | Stadium: Estadio de la Cerámica; Attendance: 12,207; Referee: José Luis Munuera Montero |

| 9 January 2019 | Getafe | 1–0 | Valladolid | Getafe |
| 20:30 CET | Ángel 90+2' | Report | | Stadium: Coliseum Alfonso Pérez; Attendance: 6,007; Referee: Mario Melero López |

| 9 January 2019 | Real Madrid | 3–0 | Leganés | Madrid |
| 21:30 CET | Ramos 44' (pen.); Vázquez 68'; Vinícius 77' | Report | | Stadium: Santiago Bernabéu; Attendance: 44,231; Referee: Jesús Gil Manzano |

| 10 January 2019 | Athletic Bilbao | 1–3 | Sevilla | Bilbao |
| 19:30 CET | San José 49' | Report | Nolito 6'; Silva 53'; Ben Yedder 77' | Stadium: San Mamés; Attendance: 33,847; Referee: Carlos del Cerro Grande |

| 10 January 2019 | Real Betis | 0–0 | Real Sociedad | Seville |
| 20:30 CET | | Report | | Stadium: Benito Villamarín; Attendance: 26,273; Referee: Santiago Jaime Latre |

| 10 January 2019 | Levante | 2–1 | Barcelona | Valencia |
| 21:30 CET | Cabaco 4'; Mayoral 18' | Report | Coutinho 85' (pen.) | Stadium: Ciutat de València; Attendance: 17,614; Referee: Ricardo de Burgos Bengoetxea |

=== Second leg ===
| 15 January 2019 | Valladolid | 1–1 (1–2 agg.) | Getafe | Valladolid |
| 19:30 CET | Verde 55' | Report | Ángel 29' (pen.) | Stadium: José Zorrilla; Attendance: 11,183; Referee: Javier Alberola Rojas |

| 15 January 2019 | Valencia | 3–0 (4–2 agg.) | Sporting Gijón | Valencia |
| 21:30 CET | Mina 65', 76'; Ferran 90' | Report | | Stadium: Mestalla; Attendance: 33,149; Referee: Xavier Estrada Fernández |

| 16 January 2019 | Atlético Madrid | 3–3 (4–4 (a) agg.) | Girona | Madrid |
| 19:30 CET | Kalinić 12'; Correa 66'; Griezmann 84' | Report | Valery 37'; Stuani 59'; Doumbia 88' | Stadium: Wanda Metropolitano; Attendance: 45,221; Referee: Antonio Mateu Lahoz |

| 16 January 2019 | Sevilla | 0–1 (3–2 agg.) | Athletic Bilbao | Seville |
| 20:30 CET | | Report | Guruzeta 77' | Stadium: Ramón Sánchez Pizjuán; Attendance: 26,456; Referee: José Luis González González |

| 16 January 2019 | Leganés | 1–0 (1–3 agg.) | Real Madrid | Leganés |
| 21:30 CET | Braithwaite 30' | Report | | Stadium: Butarque; Attendance: 9,437; Referee: Juan Martínez Munuera |

| 17 January 2019 | Real Sociedad | 2–2 (2–2 (a) agg.) | Real Betis | San Sebastián |
| 19:30 CET | Zubeldia 40'; Merino 62' | Report | Canales 37'; Loren 70' | Stadium: Anoeta; Attendance: 21,090; Referee: Prieto Iglesias |

| 17 January 2019 | Espanyol | 3–1 (5–3 agg.) | Villarreal | Cornellà de Llobregat |
| 20:30 CET | Piatti 34' (pen.); Iglesias 37' (pen.), 74' | Report | Chukwueze 42' | Stadium: RCDE Stadium; Attendance: 11,171; Referee: Pablo González Fuertes |

| 17 January 2019 | Barcelona | 3–0 (4–2 agg.) | Levante | Barcelona |
| 21:30 CET | Dembélé 30', 31'; Messi 54' | Report | | Stadium: Camp Nou; Attendance: 42,838; Referee: José María Sánchez Martínez |

== Quarter-finals ==
The draw for the quarter-finals took place on 18 January 2019 at Ciudad del Fútbol in Las Rozas, Madrid.

All remaining teams are from the top tier.

| Team 1 | Agg. | Team 2 | 1st leg | 2nd leg |
|---|---|---|---|---|
| Real Madrid | 7–3 | Girona | 4–2 | 3–1 |
| Getafe | 2–3 | Valencia | 1–0 | 1–3 |
| Sevilla | 3–6 | Barcelona | 2–0 | 1–6 |
| Espanyol | 2–4 | Real Betis | 1–1 | 1–3 (a.e.t.) |

=== First leg ===
| 22 January 2019 | Getafe | 1–0 | Valencia | Getafe |
| 21:30 CET | Molina 77' | Report | | Stadium: Coliseum Alfonso Pérez; Attendance: 7,021; Referee: Jesús Gil Manzano |

| 23 January 2019 | Sevilla | 2–0 | Barcelona | Seville |
| 21:30 CET | Sarabia 58'; Ben Yedder 76' | Report | | Stadium: Ramón Sánchez Pizjuán; Attendance: 38,403; Referee: Carlos del Cerro Grande |

| 24 January 2019 | Espanyol | 1–1 | Real Betis | Barcelona |
| 19:30 CET | Iglesias 27' | Report | Sanabria 81' | Stadium: RCDE Stadium; Attendance: 13,381; Referee: Antonio Mateu Lahoz |

| 24 January 2019 | Real Madrid | 4–2 | Girona | Madrid |
| 21:30 CET | Vázquez 18'; Ramos 42' (pen.), 77'; Benzema 80' | Report | Lozano 7'; Granell 66' (pen.) | Stadium: Santiago Bernabéu; Attendance: 50,865; Referee: Alberto Undiano Mallenco |

=== Second leg ===
| 29 January 2019 | Valencia | 3–1 (3–2 agg.) | Getafe | Valencia |
| 21:30 CET | Rodrigo 61', 90+2', 90+3' | Report | Molina 1' | Stadium: Mestalla; Attendance: 34,140; Referee: Xavier Estrada Fernández |

| 30 January 2019 | Real Betis | 3–1 (a.e.t.) (4–2 agg.) | Espanyol | Seville |
| 19:30 CET | Lo Celso 76'; Sergio León 95'; Mandi 99' | Report | Baptistão 33' | Stadium: Benito Villamarín; Attendance: 40,028; Referee: Ricardo de Burgos Bengoetxea |

| 30 January 2019 | Barcelona | 6–1 (6–3 agg.) | Sevilla | Barcelona |
| 21:30 CET | Coutinho 13' (pen.), 53'; Rakitić 31'; Roberto 54'; Suárez 89'; Messi 90+2' | Report | Arana 67' | Stadium: Camp Nou; Attendance: 58,050; Referee: José María Sánchez Martínez |

| 31 January 2019 | Girona | 1–3 (3–7 agg.) | Real Madrid | Girona |
| 21:30 CET | Porro 71' | Report | Benzema 27', 43'; Llorente 76' | Stadium: Montilivi; Attendance: 14,158; Referee: Juan Martínez Munuera |

== Semi-finals ==
The draw for the semi-finals took place on 1 February 2019 at the venue for the final of the competition, the Benito Villamarín Stadium.

All four teams remaining came from pot 2, which included teams involved in European competitions.

The winners of the semi-finals advanced to the final and qualified for the 2020 Supercopa de España.

| Team 1 | Agg. | Team 2 | 1st leg | 2nd leg |
|---|---|---|---|---|
| Real Betis | 2–3 | Valencia | 2–2 | 0–1 |
| Barcelona | 4–1 | Real Madrid | 1–1 | 3–0 |

=== First leg ===
| 6 February 2019 | Barcelona | 1–1 | Real Madrid | Barcelona |
| 21:00 CET | Malcom 57' | Report | Vázquez 6' | Stadium: Camp Nou; Attendance: 92,008; Referee: Antonio Mateu Lahoz |

| 7 February 2019 | Real Betis | 2–2 | Valencia | Seville |
| 21:00 CET | Loren 45'; Joaquín 54' | Report | Cheryshev 70'; Gameiro 90+2' | Stadium: Benito Villamarín; Attendance: 57,123; Referee: Carlos del Cerro Grande |

=== Second leg ===
| 27 February 2019 | Real Madrid | 0–3 (1–4 agg.) | Barcelona | Madrid |
| 21:00 CET | | Report | Suárez 50', 73' (pen.); Varane 69' (o.g.) | Stadium: Santiago Bernabéu; Attendance: 80,472; Referee: José María Sánchez Martínez |

| 28 February 2019 | Valencia | 1–0 (3–2 agg.) | Real Betis | Valencia |
| 21:00 CET | Rodrigo 56' | Report | | Stadium: Mestalla; Attendance: 45,222; Referee: José Luis González González |

== Final ==
The final took place on 25 May 2019 at the Benito Villamarín Stadium in Seville.

25 May 2019
21:00 UTC+2

| Barcelona | 1–2 | Valencia |
|---|---|---|
| Messi 73' | Report | Gameiro 21'; Rodrigo 33' |

Benito Villamarín, Seville
Attendance: 53,698
Referee: Alberto Undiano Mallenco

== Top goalscorers ==
| Rank | Player | Club | Goals |
|---|---|---|---|
| 1 | (Spain) Ángel | Getafe | 5 |
| 1 | (Cameroon) Karl Toko Ekambi | Villarreal | 5 |
| 1 | (Spain) Rodrigo | Valencia | 5 |
| 4 | (Spain) Aritz Aduriz | Athletic Bilbao | 4 |
| 4 | (France) Karim Benzema | Real Madrid | 4 |
| 4 | (Spain) Santi Mina | Valencia | 4 |
| 4 | (Italy) Daniele Verde | Valladolid | 4 |
| 8 | (Spain) Aridane Santana | Cultural Leonesa | 3 |
| 8 | (Spain) Marco Asensio | Real Madrid | 3 |
| 8 | (Colombia) Carlos Bacca | Villarreal | 3 |
| 8 | (Brazil) Philippe Coutinho | Barcelona | 3 |
| 8 | (Spain) Borja Iglesias | Espanyol | 3 |
| 8 | (Spain) Sergio León | Real Betis | 3 |
| 8 | (Spain) Sergio Ramos | Real Madrid | 3 |
| 8 | (Uruguay) Luis Suárez | Barcelona | 3 |
| 8 | (Spain) David Torres | Ontinyent | 3 |
| 8 | (Spain) Lucas Vázquez | Real Madrid | 3 |
| 8 | (Argentina) Lionel Messi | Barcelona | 3 |
