= Rubén Palomeque (footballer) =

Spanish footballer

Personal information
- Full name: Rubén Palomeque Juárez
- Date of birth: 12 September 1994 (age 32)
- Place of birth: Málaga, Spain
- Height: 1.77 m (5 ft 10 in)
- Position: Defender

Team information
- Current team: El Ejido
- Number: 6

Youth career
- Málaga
- 2012–2013: Bologna

Senior career*
Years	Team	Apps	(Gls)
2013–2017	Bologna	0	(0)
2013–2014	→ Como (loan)	5	(0)
2014	→ Paganese (loan)	12	(0)
2014–2015	→ Cremonese (loan)	9	(0)
2015–2016	→ Paganese (loan	9	(1)
2016	→ Lucchese (loan)	7	(0)
2016–2017	→ Lupa Roma (loan)	18	(1)
2017–2018	Linares Deportivo		
2018–2019	Cavese	27	(1)
2019–	El Ejido	4	(1)
- * Club domestic league appearances and goals as of 15 September 2019

Rubén Palomeque Juárez (born 12 September 1994) is a Spanish footballer who plays for El Ejido.

== Biography ==
Born in Málaga, Spain, Palomeque was signed by Italian Serie A club Bologna in July 2012. He was a player of the reserve team. On 3 August 2013 Palomeque was signed by Como in a temporary deal. On 8 January 2014 he was signed by Paganese in another loan.

On 18 July 2014 Palomeque and Alessandro Marchi were signed by Cremonese in a temporary deal and definitive deal respectively.

On 31 August 2015 Palomeque was re-signed by Paganese in a temporary deal.

On 16 August 2016 he was signed by Lupa Roma F.C. on loan.

On 12 August 2018 he returned to Italy, signing with Cavese.
