= Mario Abenza =

Spanish footballer (born 1996)

Personal information
- Full name: Mario Nicolás Abenza
- Date of birth: 19 February 1996 (age 30)
- Place of birth: Murcia, Spain
- Height: 1.83 m (6 ft 0 in)
- Position: Midfielder

Team information
- Current team: Águilas
- Number: 8

Youth career
- Murcia
- Getafe
- Coruxo
- 2013–2015: Almería

Senior career*
Years	Team	Apps	(Gls)
2014–2019	Almería B	87	(1)
2017–2018	→ Linense (loan)	19	(0)
2018–2020	Almería	0	(0)
2019–2020	→ Sanluqueño (loan)	22	(2)
2020–2021	Real Murcia	22	(1)
2021–2023	UCAM Murcia	62	(2)
2023–	Águilas	94	(4)
- * Club domestic league appearances and goals as of 7 May 2026

Mario Nicolás Abenza (born 19 February 1996) is a Spanish professional footballer who plays as a midfielder for Águilas.

== Club career ==
Abenza was born in Murcia, and joined UD Almería's youth setup in 2013. He made his senior debut with the reserves on 16 November 2014, coming on as a second-half substitute for Míchel Zabaco in a 1–0 Segunda División B away win against Real Betis B.

Abenza scored his first senior goal on 2 January 2017, netting the winner in a 2–1 win at CD Alhaurino in the Tercera División. On 10 July, he was loaned to Real Balompédica Linense of the third division for a year.

On 18 October 2018, Abenza made his professional debut with Almería's first team, replacing José Corpas in a 3–1 home win against CF Reus Deportiu in the season's Copa del Rey. The following 17 July, he was loaned to third division side Atlético Sanluqueño CF for the season.

On 8 September 2020, Abenza signed for Real Murcia of the third tier, after terminating his contract with the Rojiblancos.
