= Sergio Pérez (footballer, born 1997) =

Spanish footballer

Personal information
- Full name: Sergio Pérez Jaén
- Date of birth: 4 June 1997 (age 29)
- Place of birth: Gerena, Spain
- Height: 1.82 m (6 ft 0 in)
- Position: Winger

Team information
- Current team: Linense

Youth career
- Sevilla
- San José
- 2014–2015: Lucena
- 2015–2016: Recreativo

Senior career*
Years	Team	Apps	(Gls)
2015	Lucena	1	(0)
2016–2017	Recreativo B	34	(9)
2017–2019	Almería B	67	(10)
2018	Almería	1	(0)
2019–2020	Cádiz B	27	(2)
2019	Cádiz	0	(0)
2020–2022	El Ejido	54	(6)
2022–2024	Melilla	50	(5)
2024–2025	SS Reyes	5	(0)
2025–	Linense	4	(0)
- * Club domestic league appearances and goals as of 28 September 2025

Sergio Pérez Jaén (born 20 June 1997) is a Spanish professional footballer who plays for Tercera Federación club Linense as a left winger.

== Club career ==
Pérez was born in Gerena, Seville, Andalusia, and was an AD San José youth graduate. On 21 November 2014 he joined Segunda División B side Lucena CF, and made his senior debut the following 26 April by playing 26 minutes in a 0–6 away loss against Real Betis B.

In November 2015, Pérez moved to Recreativo de Huelva and returned to youth football. He was promoted to the reserves in July of the following year, and scored his first senior goals on 4 September by netting a brace in a 3–0 home win against CD San Roque.

On 16 July 2017 Pérez moved to another reserve team, UD Almería B in the fourth division. He made his first-team debut on 17 August of the following year, coming on as a late substitute for Joaquín Arzura in a 0–1 away loss against Cádiz CF in the Segunda División.

Pérez scored his first professional goal on 18 October 2018, netting the opener in a 3–1 home defeat of CF Reus Deportiu in the season's Copa del Rey. On 16 August of the following year, he moved to Cádiz on a two-year contract and was assigned to the B-side also in the third division.

On 20 August 2020, Pérez agreed to a deal with CD El Ejido, still in division three.

== Personal life ==
Pérez's younger brother, Perotti, is also a footballer and plays for Sevilla's U-19 team as a winger.
