= Jorge Rico =

Spanish footballer

Personal information
- Full name: Jorge Rico Vázquez
- Date of birth: 30 August 1996 (age 30)
- Place of birth: Madrid, Spain
- Height: 1.70 m (5 ft 7 in)
- Position: Midfielder

Youth career
- Atlético Madrid
- Alcorcón

Senior career*
Years	Team	Apps	(Gls)
2015	Alcorcón	1	(0)
2015–2018	Alcorcón B	58	(3)
2018	Móstoles	17	(0)
2018–2019	Internacional Madrid	2	(0)
2019–2020	Unión Adarve	35	(0)
2020–2021	Pinto	27	(0)
2021–2022	Villarrubia	17	(0)
2022–2024	Illescas	44	(1)
- * Club domestic league appearances and goals as of 26 November 2023

Jorge Rico Vázquez (born 30 August 1996) is a Spanish footballer who plays as a midfielder.

== Club career ==
An AD Alcorcón youth graduate, Rico made his first team debut on 31 May 2015, before even appearing with the reserves, coming on as a second-half substitute for Máyor in a 1–1 home draw against CD Numancia in the Segunda División. He subsequently featured with the B-side in the Tercera División.

On 26 January 2018, after spending the first half of the campaign nursing a knee injury, Rico joined fellow fourth division side CD Móstoles URJC.
