= CP El Ejido 1969 =

Association football club in Spain

Poli El Ejido
- Full name: Club Polideportivo El Ejido 1969, S.A.D.
- Nicknames: Poli, El Ejido, Los Celestes, Los Pitufos
- Founded: 2012; 14 years ago
- Ground: Santo Domingo; El Ejido, Andalusia, Spain
- Capacity: 7,870
- Owner: Rubén Alejandro Bouza
- President: Rubén Alejandro Bouza
- Head coach: José Francisco
- League: División de Honor – Group 2
- 2024–25: Tercera Federación – Group 9, 16th of 18 (relegated)
Home colours	Away colours

Club Polideportivo El Ejido 1969 is a Spanish football club based in El Ejido, in the autonomous community of Andalusia. Founded in 1989 under the name of El Ejido Fútbol Sala (was only a futsal club until 2012), it currently plays in División de Honor – Group 2.

== History ==
Logo used until 2024

In 2013, the club absorbed CP Berja and name changed to CD El Ejido 2012.

On 25 June 2016, El Ejido were promoted to Segunda División B after overcoming CD Laredo in the last round of the promotion play-offs. The season in the new category was complicated, but the club managed to remain its place in Segunda División B by finishing 14th among 20 teams.

In the 2018–19 season, the club was relegated to Tercera División by finishing 17th in the Segunda División B, Group 4. In November 2021, the club changed name to Club Polideportivo El Ejido 1969, as an honour to Polideportivo Ejido.

In 2025, Poli El Ejido suffered relegation from Tercera Federación, returning to the regional leagues after 11 years. Initially excluded from the División de Honor, the club was readmitted in the category due to a court order on 30 January 2026, but deemed "impossible" to play all 30 matches of the competition within four months. In February, the Administrative Court of Sport of Andalusia (TADA) – which also granted the club's reintegration earlier – ruled in favor of Poli Ejido for the suspension of their fixture calendar, stating that the Royal Andalusian Football Federation would need to seek a "viable" alternative to comply with the previous resolution.

== Season to season ==
Season	Tier	Division	Place	Copa del Rey
2012–13	6	Reg. Pref.	3rd	
2013–14	5	1ª And.	1st	
2014–15	4	3ª	13th	
2015–16	4	3ª	4th	
2016–17	3	2ª B	14th	
2017–18	3	2ª B	10th	
2018–19	3	2ª B	17th	
2019–20	4	3ª	2nd	
2020–21	3	2ª B	8th / 2nd	First round
2021–22	4	2ª RFEF	11th	
2022–23	4	2ª Fed.	15th	
2023–24	5	3ª Fed.	13th	
2024–25	5	3ª Fed.	16th	
2025–26	6	Div. Hon.	(R)	

- 4 seasons in Segunda División B
- 2 seasons in Segunda Federación/Segunda División RFEF
- 3 seasons in Tercera División
- 2 seasons in Tercera Federación

== Current squad ==
As of 9 March 2023

Note: Flags indicate national team as defined under FIFA eligibility rules; some limited exceptions apply. Players may hold more than one non-FIFA nationality.

No.	Pos.	Nation	Player
1	GK	ESP	Jesús Godino
2	DF	VEN	Adrián Cova
3	DF	ESP	Jonxa Vidal
4	MF	ESP	Isaiah (on loan from Atlético Madrid B)
5	DF	ESP	Cristian Moreno (captain)
6	DF	ESP	Rubén Palomeque
7	FW	ESP	Juanje
8	MF	ESP	Víctor Pérez
9	FW	ESP	Jon Etxaniz
10	FW	ESP	Toni Dovale
11	FW	ESP	Boris Garrós

No.	Pos.	Nation	Player
13	GK	BRA	Fred Conte (on loan from Valladolid B)
14	MF	SEN	Sana N'Diaye
15	FW	ESP	Miguel Olavide
16	MF	ARG	Lucas Ferraz (on loan from Argentinos Juniors)
17	FW	ESP	Sergio Pérez
18	DF	ESP	Iñigo Zubiri
20	DF	BRA	Tiago Portuga
21	FW	UKR	Danylo Honcharuk (on loan from Shakhtar Donetsk)
22	MF	ESP	Toni Arranz
—	DF	ARG	Mauro dos Santos
