= Lucien Owona =

Cameroonian footballer

Personal information
- Full name: Lucien Fridolin Owona-Ndong
- Date of birth: 9 August 1990 (age 36)
- Place of birth: Douala, Cameroon
- Height: 1.89 m (6 ft 2 in)
- Position: Centre back

Team information
- Current team: Cornellà
- Number: 16

Youth career
- 2002–2004: Camrail Sports Academy

Senior career*
Years	Team	Apps	(Gls)
2005–2006	Matelots		
2006–2007	Cetef		
2007–2009	Les Astres		
2009–2011	Paris Saint-Germain B	16	(0)
2011	Oviedo B	0	(0)
2011–2013	Oviedo	49	(0)
2013–2014	Noja	19	(0)
2014	Arroyo	10	(0)
2014–2015	Villanovense	32	(1)
2015–2016	Caudal	11	(3)
2016–2017	Villanovense	38	(2)
2017	Alcorcón	16	(2)
2017–2020	Almería	59	(3)
2020–2021	Extremadura	2	(0)
2021–	Cornellà	1	(0)

International career^{‡}
	Cameroon U20	3	(0)
2017–	Cameroon	1	(0)
- * Club domestic league appearances and goals as of 28 March 2021 ‡ National team caps and goals as of 13 June 2017

Lucien Fridolin Owona-Ndong (born 9 August 1990) is a Cameroonian professional footballer who plays as a central defender for Spanish club UE Cornellà.

== Club career ==
Owona was born in Douala, and made his senior debut with AS Matelots in 2005. After spells at AS Cetef de Bonabéri and Les Astres FC, he agreed to a contract with Paris Saint-Germain on 10 September 2009.

After only appearing for PSG's B-team in Championnat de France amateur, Owona moved to Spain and joined Real Oviedo Vetusta on 31 January 2011. Although he did not play with the side due to bureaucratic problems, he was still promoted to the first team in Segunda División B on 28 May.

After leaving Oviedo, Owona continued to appear in the third level but also in Tercera División in the following years, representing SD Noja, Arroyo CP, CF Villanovense (two stints) and Caudal Deportivo. In 2015, while representing Villanovense, he suffered racial abuse from the supporters of Real Betis B.

On 17 January 2017, Owona signed a two-and-a-half-year contract with Segunda División side AD Alcorcón. He made his professional debut the following day, starting in a 0–2 Copa del Rey home loss against Deportivo Alavés.

Owona scored his first professional goal on 19 February 2017, netting the first in a 1–1 home draw against Real Zaragoza. On 22 July he terminated his contract, and signed a three-year deal with fellow second-tier club UD Almería just hours later.

On 22 January 2020, after suffering a serious injury, Owona cut ties with the Rojiblancos. On 23 September, after nine months without a club, he signed for Extremadura UD in the third tier.

== International career ==
After representing Cameroon at under-20 level, Owona was included in Hugo Broos's final 23-man squad for the 2017 FIFA Confederations Cup.

After failing to appear during the whole tournament, Owona made his full international debut on 13 June 2017, starting in a 0–4 friendly loss against Colombia.
