= Juan Ibiza =

Spanish footballer

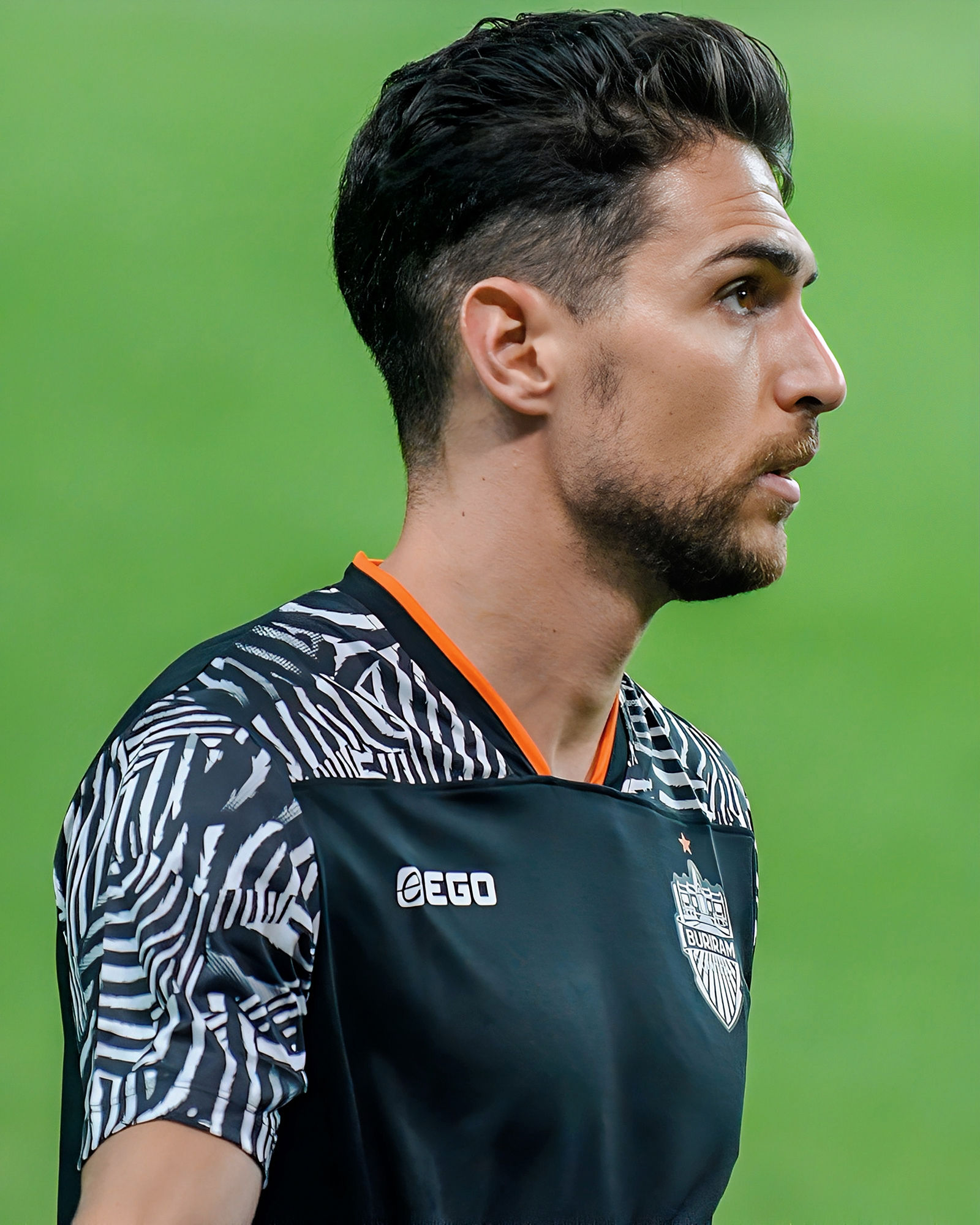
- Ibiza in 2025

Personal information
- Full name: Juan Fernández Blanco
- Date of birth: 17 August 1995 (age 31)
- Place of birth: Ibiza, Spain
- Height: 1.88 m (6 ft 2 in)
- Position: Centre back

Team information
- Current team: Incheon United (on loan from Buriram United)
- Number: 2

Youth career
- Portmany
- 2006–2014: Villarreal

Senior career*
Years	Team	Apps	(Gls)
2014–2016	Villarreal C	58	(2)
2016–2019	Villarreal B	42	(0)
2018–2019	→ Almería (loan)	23	(0)
2019–2021	Almería	8	(0)
2020–2021	→ Sabadell (loan)	35	(3)
2021–2023	Ibiza	47	(3)
2023–2025	Widzew Łódź	41	(1)
2025–	Buriram United	0	(0)
2026–	→ Incheon United (loan)	20	(1)
- * Club domestic league appearances and goals as of 3 August 2026

Juan Fernández Blanco (born 17 August 1995), known as Juan Ibiza (IPA: [ˈxwan iˈβiθa]), is a Spanish professional footballer who plays as a central defender for K League 1 club Incheon United, on loan from Thai League 1 club Buriram United.

== Club career ==
Born in Ibiza, Balearic Islands, Ibiza joined Villarreal CF's youth setup at the age of eleven. He made his senior debut with the C-team on 30 August 2014, starting in a 1–3 Tercera División home loss against CD Castellón.

Ibiza scored his first goals on 24 April 2016, netting a brace in a 3–2 home win against CD Acero. Ahead of the 2016–17 season, he was promoted to the reserves in Segunda División B.

On 16 July 2018, Ibiza was loaned to Segunda División side UD Almería for one year, with a buyout clause. He made his first-team debut on 26 August, coming on as a late substitute for goalscorer Luis Rioja in a 1–1 home draw against CD Tenerife in the Segunda División.

On 10 July 2019, Ibiza joined the Rojiblancos permanently on a three-year contract, after the club activated his buyout clause. On 24 September of the following year, after featuring rarely due to injuries, he was loaned to fellow second division side CE Sabadell FC for the 2020–21 campaign.

Ibiza scored his first professional goal on 1 November 2020, netting the opener in a 3–0 away win over SD Ponferradina. On 31 August of the following year, he terminated his contract with Almería, and signed a two-year deal with fellow second division side UD Ibiza just hours later.

On 4 September 2023, Ibiza joined Polish Ekstraklasa club Widzew Łódź on a two-year contract, with an option for another year. He was released by Widzew at the end of his contract in June 2025.
