= Quique Rivero =

Spanish footballer

Personal information
- Full name: Enrique Rivero Pérez
- Date of birth: 16 April 1992 (age 34)
- Place of birth: Cabezón de la Sal, Spain
- Height: 1.76 m (5 ft 9 in)
- Position: Midfielder

Team information
- Current team: UD Logroñés
- Number: 23

Youth career
- Racing Santander

Senior career*
Years	Team	Apps	(Gls)
2011–2013	Racing B	57	(4)
2012–2013	Racing Santander	8	(0)
2013–2015	Tenerife	41	(2)
2015–2017	Cartagena	69	(6)
2017–2019	Racing Santander	49	(7)
2019–2020	Recreativo	22	(2)
2020–2025	Real Unión	148	(17)
2025–	UD Logroñés	29	(12)
- * Club domestic league appearances and goals as of 7 May 2026

Enrique 'Quique' Rivero Pérez (born 16 April 1992) is a Spanish footballer who plays for Segunda Federación club UD Logroñés as a midfielder.

== Club career ==
Born Cabezón de la Sal, Cantabria, Rivero was a product of local Racing de Santander's youth system. He made his first-team – and La Liga – debut on 12 April 2012, starting in the 0–3 home loss against RCD Mallorca.

On 16 July 2013, after suffering two consecutive relegations with his first club, Rivero signed with Segunda División side CD Tenerife. He scored his first professional goal on 20 April of the following year, the winner in a 3–2 home victory over CD Numancia.

On 3 August 2015, after being deemed surplus to requirements by manager Raül Agné, Rivero moved to FC Cartagena of Segunda División B. He continued competing in that tier the following seasons, with Racing, Recreativo de Huelva and Real Unión.
