= Adri Montoro =

Spanish footballer (born 1995)

Personal information
- Full name: Adrián Hernández Montoro
- Date of birth: 4 January 1995 (age 31)
- Place of birth: Terrassa, Spain
- Height: 1.81 m (5 ft 11 in)
- Position: Right back

Team information
- Current team: San Cristóbal

Youth career
- Can Perallada
- 2008–2013: Espanyol

Senior career*
Years	Team	Apps	(Gls)
2013–2014	Barbastro	26	(2)
2014–2015	Girona B	26	(0)
2015–2016	Somozas	19	(1)
2016–2017	Prat	18	(0)
2017	Cornellà	1	(0)
2017–2018	Sporting B	30	(1)
2018	Sporting Gijón	2	(0)
2018–2019	Almería	3	(0)
2019–2020	Cornellà	7	(0)
2020–2021	Montañesa	7	(0)
2021–2022	Granollers	19	(1)
2022–2024	San Cristóbal	31	(0)
2024	Namdhari FC	3	(0)
2025–	San Cristóbal	0	(0)
- * Club domestic league appearances and goals as of 15 December 2024

Adrián "Adri" Hernández Montoro (born 4 January 1995) is a Spanish professional footballer who plays as a right back for Tercera Federación club San Cristóbal.

== Club career ==
Born in Terrassa, Barcelona, Catalonia, Adri finished his development at RCD Espanyol. He made his senior debut with Tercera División club UD Barbastro in 2013, before signing with Girona FC the following year.

On 18 July 2015, after only featuring with the reserves, Adri joined UD Somozas in Segunda División B. On 11 July of the following year, he moved to fellow league side AE Prat.

On 13 July 2017, Adri agreed to a contract with UE Cornellà still in the third division. On 31 August, however, he moved to another reserve team, Sporting de Gijón B in the same level. His maiden appearance for the first team of the latter took place 28 January 2018, when he started in a 2–0 home win against Gimnàstic de Tarragona in the Segunda División championship.

On 29 June 2018, Adri signed with UD Almería from division two. He made his competitive debut for the Andalusians on 11 September, playing the full 90 minutes in a 2–1 away defeat of Málaga CF for the season's Copa del Rey and scoring the winning goal.

On 25 August 2019, after being demoted to third-choice after the arrival of Iván Balliu, Montoro terminated his contract with Almería. He was without club until 14 November 2019, where he re-joined UE Cornellà.
