= Juan Fernández (footballer, born 1999) =

Spanish footballer

Personal information
- Full name: Juan Fernández Santiago
- Date of birth: 11 September 1999 (age 27)
- Place of birth: Barcelona, Spain
- Height: 1.78 m (5 ft 10 in)
- Position: Forward

Team information
- Current team: Montañesa

Youth career
- Unificació Badalona Sud
- 2009–2011: Barcelona
- 2011–2012: Espanyol
- 2012–2015: Cornellà
- 2015–2018: Barcelona

Senior career*
Years	Team	Apps	(Gls)
2018–2019	Cornellà	12	(0)
2019–2021	Las Palmas B	46	(6)
2019–2021	Las Palmas	5	(0)
2021–2022	Murcia	27	(2)
2022–2023	Badalona Futur	20	(0)
2024–2025	San Cristóbal	0	(0)
2025–	Montañesa	0	(0)
- * Club domestic league appearances and goals as of 14 May 2023

Juan Fernández Santiago (born 11 September 1999) is a Spanish professional footballer. Mainly a forward, he can also play as a winger for Montañesa.

== Club career ==
Born in Barcelona, Catalonia, Fernández represented AE Unificació Badalona Sud, FC Barcelona (two stints), RCD Espanyol and UE Cornellà; he finished his formation with Barça in 2018. On 24 August of that year he returned to Cornellà, being assigned to the first team in the Segunda División B.

Fernández made his senior debut 26 August 2018, starting in a 1–1 away draw against UE Olot. The following 30 January, he signed for UD Las Palmas and was assigned to the reserves also in the third division.

Fernández made his first team debut for the Canarians on 31 August 2019, coming on as a second-half substitute for Cristian Cedrés in a 2–2 home draw against Racing de Santander in the Segunda División. On 18 August 2021, he moved to Segunda División RFEF side Real Murcia.

== Honours ==
=== Club ===
Barcelona

- UEFA Youth League: 2017–18
