= Juan Carlos Real =

Spanish footballer

Juan Carlos
Personal information
- Full name: Juan Carlos Real Ruiz
- Date of birth: 15 March 1991 (age 35)
- Place of birth: A Coruña, Spain
- Height: 1.83 m (6 ft 0 in)
- Position: Attacking midfielder

Team information
- Current team: Murcia
- Number: 22

Youth career
- 2000–2001: Victoria
- 2001–2010: Deportivo La Coruña

Senior career*
Years	Team	Apps	(Gls)
2009–2013	Deportivo B	115	(28)
2012–2015	Deportivo La Coruña	31	(3)
2013	→ Huesca (loan)	10	(1)
2015	Tenerife	19	(1)
2016–2017	CFR Cluj	39	(7)
2017–2018	Tenerife	31	(5)
2018–2019	Almería	39	(10)
2019–2023	Huesca	105	(13)
2023–2024	Cartagena	25	(3)
2024–	Murcia	64	(8)
- * Club domestic league appearances and goals as of 10 June 2026

Juan Carlos Real Ruiz (born 15 March 1991), known as Juan Carlos, is a Spanish professional footballer who plays as an attacking midfielder for Real Murcia.

== Club career ==
Born in A Coruña, Juan Carlos was a product of local Deportivo de La Coruña's youth system, and made his official debut with the first team on 7 September 2011, playing the full 90 minutes in a 5–1 home win against Girona FC in the second round of the Copa del Rey. He scored 15 goals for the reserves in 2011–12 in the Tercera División.

On 3 June 2012, as Depor were already promoted to La Liga as champions, Juan Carlos made his league debut with the main squad, playing 28 minutes in a 1–0 Segunda División away victory over Villarreal CF B. He continued to appear regularly for the B side, however.

On 14 January 2013, Juan Carlos was loaned to SD Huesca until June. He scored his first professional goal later that month, opening the 2–1 away defeat of CD Numancia but seeing the Aragonese club eventually suffer second-tier relegation.

Juan Carlos returned to the Galicians in July, being definitely promoted to the first team also in division two. He played 27 matches and scored three goals during the season, as Deportivo returned to the top flight at the first attempt.

On 2 April 2014, Juan Carlos was slapped by teammate Luisinho in the face following an argument in training. On 26 January of the following year, after being rarely used during the campaign, he terminated his contract with Depor and joined second-division side CD Tenerife hours later.

After a two-year spell in the Romanian Liga I with CFR Cluj, Juan Carlos returned to Tenerife by signing a two-year deal. On 27 July 2018, he moved to UD Almería also of the second tier on a one-year contract.

On 31 July 2019, free agent Juan Carlos joined his former club Huesca on a two-year deal after their top-flight relegation. In August 2021, having been without a contract for two months, he re-signed for two years.

On 14 July 2023, Juan Carlos agreed to a three-year contract at FC Cartagena, still in division two. He left at the end of his first, however.

Juan Carlos signed for Real Murcia CF of Primera Federación in August 2024.

== Honours ==
Deportivo

- Segunda División: 2011–12

CFR Cluj

- Cupa României: 2015–16

Huesca

- Segunda División: 2019–20
