= Joaquín Arzura =

Argentine footballer

Personal information
- Date of birth: 18 May 1993 (age 33)
- Place of birth: Campana, Argentina
- Height: 1.76 m (5 ft 9 in)
- Position: Defensive midfielder

Team information
- Current team: Isernia

Youth career
- Tigre

Senior career*
Years	Team	Apps	(Gls)
2013–2015	Tigre	73	(1)
2016–2021	River Plate	13	(1)
2017–2018	→ Osasuna (loan)	28	(0)
2018–2019	→ Almería (loan)	11	(0)
2019	→ Nacional (loan)	5	(0)
2019–2020	→ Huracán (loan)	3	(0)
2020–2021	→ Panetolikos (loan)	9	(0)
2021–2022	Instituto	38	(0)
2023	Quilmes	4	(0)
2023	Villa Dálmine	11	(1)
2024	Independiente Rivadavia	1	(0)
2024–	Isernia	3	(2)

International career
2016	Argentina U23	0	(0)
- * Club domestic league appearances and goals as of 10 November 2024

Joaquín Arzura (born 18 May 1993) is an Argentine professional footballer who plays as a defensive midfielder for Italian Serie D club Isernia.

== Club career ==
Arzura was a part of Tigre's youth academy until 2013, but made his senior debut in Copa Argentina on 29 November 2011. He came on as a substitute in the second half, and played a role when Tigre scored two late winning goals against Defensa y Justicia to make it 4–2.

His league debut came on 31 August 2013, in the 2013-14-season of Primera División, against Quilmes. He played in total 31 league games that season, making him an important player in Tigre's midfield.

On 4 January 2016, Arzura signed a 3.5 year long contract with current Copa Libertadores champions River Plate. On 28 July of the following year, after being sparingly used, he was loaned to Segunda División club CA Osasuna for one year.

On 16 July 2018, Arzura was loaned to UD Almería for one season. The following 23 January, his loan was cancelled and he moved to Nacional also in a temporary deal.
