= Sergio Aguza =

Spanish footballer

Personal information
- Full name: Sergio Aguza Santiago
- Date of birth: 2 September 1992 (age 34)
- Place of birth: Sant Boi de Llobregat, Spain
- Height: 1.75 m (5 ft 9 in)
- Position: Midfielder

Team information
- Current team: Arenteiro
- Number: 17

Youth career
- 1997–2002: Gavà
- 2002–2008: Cornellà
- 2008–2013: Real Madrid

Senior career*
Years	Team	Apps	(Gls)
2011–2013	Real Madrid C	57	(8)
2013–2015	Real Madrid B	44	(6)
2015–2016	Milton Keynes Dons	0	(0)
2016	Ponferradina	13	(3)
2016–2017	Alcorcón	15	(0)
2017–2018	Córdoba	48	(3)
2018–2021	Almería	40	(4)
2020–2021	→ Cartagena (loan)	13	(0)
2021–2022	Sabadell	30	(2)
2022–2023	Murcia	22	(1)
2023–2024	Lugo	31	(4)
2024–2025	Fuenlabrada	29	(1)
2025–	Arenteiro	6	(0)
- * Club domestic league appearances and goals as of 30 November 2025

Sergio Aguza Santiago (born 2 September 1992) is a Spanish footballer who plays as a midfielder for Primera Federación club Arenteiro.

== Club career ==
=== Real Madrid ===
Born in Sant Boi de Llobregat, Barcelona, Catalonia, after playing youth football with CF Gavà's youth setup EF Gavà and UD Cornellà, Aguza joined Real Madrid's youth facilities in 2008, aged 16. In 2011–12 season Aguza made his senior debut, playing for the C-team in the Tercera División.

In July 2013, he was promoted to the reserves in the Segunda División.

On 8 September Aguza made his professional debut, starting in a 0–1 home loss against CD Mirandés. He scored his first goal on 15 February of the following year, netting his side's second in a 3–1 home success against FC Barcelona B.

=== Milton Keynes Dons ===
On 31 July 2015, Aguza signed for English Football League Championship side Milton Keynes Dons on a two-year deal. Aguza made his debut for the club on 11 August 2015 in the 2–1 Football League Cup win over Leyton Orient.

On 16 January 2016, following limited appearances for the club, Milton Keynes Dons announced that Aguza had left the club via mutual consent.

=== Ponferradina ===
On 18 January 2016, Aguza signed a two-and-a-half-year contract with SD Ponferradina, returning to Spain and its second level. He scored his first goal for the club on 20 March, in a 2–1 home win against SD Huesca, and added two more match-winners against CD Lugo and Albacete Balompié; at the end of the campaign, he suffered team relegation.

=== Alcorcón / Córdoba ===
On 7 July 2016, Aguza signed a one-year deal with AD Alcorcón also in the second level. The following 31 January he rescinded his contract, and signed a six-month deal with fellow league team Córdoba CF just hours later.

=== Almería ===
On 13 July 2018, Aguza signed a two-year contract with UD Almería, still in the second division. On 11 March 2020, he renewed his contract until 2023.

On 5 October 2020, Aguza joined FC Cartagena, newly-promoted to division two, on a one-year loan deal. The following 13 January, however, his loan was cut short, and he moved to fellow league team Ponferradina also in a temporary deal nine days later.

=== Fuenlabrada ===
On 13 August 2024, Aguza signed one-season contract with Fuenlabrada in the third tier.
