= 2010–11 CD Numancia season =

CD Numancia
2010–11 season
- Manager: Juan Carlos Unzué
- Stadium: Estadio Los Pajaritos
- Segunda División: 10th
- Copa del Rey: First round
- Top goalscorer: League: José Barkero (15); All: José Barkero (15)
- Biggest win: Ponferradina 0–4 Numancia; Numancia 4–0 Las Palmas
- Biggest defeat: Celta Vigo 4–0 Numancia

The 2010–11 season was CD Numancia's 66th season in existence and second consecutive in the Segunda División. They also competed in the Copa del Rey.

== Players ==
=== First-team squad ===
Note: Flags indicate national team as defined under FIFA eligibility rules; some limited exceptions apply. Players may hold more than one non-FIFA nationality.

| No. | Pos. | Nation | Player |
|---|---|---|---|
| — | GK | ESP | Iñaki Lafuente |
| — | GK | ESP | Eduardo |
| — | GK | ESP | Diego de Miguel |
| — | DF | ESP | Egoitz Jaio |
| — | DF | ESP | Lolo Pavón |
| — | DF | ESP | Sergio Boris |
| — | DF | ESP | José Antonio Culebras |
| — | DF | ESP | Nandi |
| — | DF | ESP | Nano |
| — | DF | ESP | Dani López |
| — | DF | ESP | Javier Flaño |
| — | DF | ESP | Óscar López |
| — | MF | NGA | Sunny |
| — | MF | ESP | Dimas Delgado |
| — | MF | ESP | Joseba Garmendia |

| No. | Pos. | Nation | Player |
|---|---|---|---|
| — | MF | ESP | Víctor Andrés |
| — | MF | ESP | Txomin Nagore |
| — | MF | ESP | Javi Bonilla |
| — | MF | ESP | José Barkero |
| — | MF | ESP | Javier Del Pino |
| — | MF | ESP | Mario Martínez |
| — | MF | ESP | Mikel Álvaro |
| — | MF | COD | Cedrick |
| — | FW | ESP | Iñigo Vélez |
| — | FW | SEN | Ibrahima Baldé |
| — | FW | ESP | Ion Vélez |
| — | FW | ESP | Igor Angulo |
| — | FW | ESP | Diego Antón |
| — | FW | ESP | Gerard Oliva |

== Transfers ==
=== In ===
| Pos. | Player | Transferred from | Fee | Date | Source |
|---|---|---|---|---|---|
| MF | (Democratic Republic of the Congo) Cedrick | (Spain) Atlético Madrid B | Free | 1 August 2010 | |
| FW | (Senegal) Ibrahima Baldé | (Spain) Atlético Madrid | Loan | 26 August 2010 | |
| MF | (Spain) Asier Arranz | (Spain) Pontevedra | Loan return | 1 December 2010 | |
| MF | (Nigeria) Sunny | (Spain) Valencia | Loan | 1 January 2011 | |

=== Out ===
| Pos. | Player | Transferred to | Fee | Date | Source |
|---|---|---|---|---|---|
| DF | (Spain) Mikel Balenziaga | (Spain) Athletic Bilbao | Loan return | 30 June 2010 | |
| GK | (Spain) Jesús Fernández | (Spain) Real Madrid Castilla | Free | 1 August 2010 | |
| MF | (Spain) Asier Arranz | (Spain) Pontevedra | Loan | 13 August 2010 | |
| MF | (Ivory Coast) Lago Junior | (Spain) Eibar | Loan | 28 August 2010 | |

== Pre-season and friendlies ==
Win Draw Loss

| 14 August 2010 Trofeo Caja Duero | Numancia | 0–2 | Zaragoza | Soria |
| | | Report | Bertolo 36'; Pérez 46'; Contini (yellow card) 54'; Herrera (yellow card) 57'; Gabi (yellow card) 60'; José (yellow card) 65' | Stadium: Estadio Los Pajaritos; Referee: Valdés Aller |

| 7 October 2010 Friendly | Osasuna | 1–0 | Numancia | Aranguren |
| 17:00 CEST (UTC+2) | Sola 68' | Report | | Stadium: Tajonar Facilities Stadium; Referee: Miguel Ángel Vila |

== Competitions ==
=== Overall record ===
| Competition | First match | Last match | Starting round | Final position | Record | | | | | | | |
| Competition | First match | Last match | Starting round | Final position | Pld | W | D | L | GF | GA | GD | Win % |
|---|---|---|---|---|---|---|---|---|---|---|---|---|
| Segunda División | 29 August 2010 | 4 June 2011 | Matchday 1 | | 42 | 17 | 6 | 19 | 65 | 63 | +2 | 40.48 |
| Copa del Rey | 1 September 2010 | | First round | First round | 1 | 0 | 0 | 1 | 0 | 1 | −1 | 0.00 |
| Total | | | | | 43 | 17 | 6 | 20 | 65 | 64 | +1 | 39.53 |

Source: Competitions

=== Segunda División ===
==== League table ====
| Pos | Team | Pld | W | D | L | GF | GA | GD | Pts |
|---|---|---|---|---|---|---|---|---|---|
| 8 | Xerez | 42 | 17 | 9 | 16 | 60 | 64 | −4 | 60 |
| 9 | Alcorcón | 42 | 17 | 7 | 18 | 57 | 52 | +5 | 58 |
| 10 | Numancia | 42 | 17 | 6 | 19 | 65 | 63 | +2 | 57 (Note: GIR 2–0 NUM; NUM 4–0 GIR) |
| 11 | Girona | 42 | 15 | 12 | 15 | 58 | 56 | +2 | 57 |
| 12 | Recreativo | 42 | 12 | 20 | 10 | 44 | 37 | +7 | 56 (Note: REC 3–0 CAR; CAR 1–3 REC) |

Source: FBref – 2010–2011 Segunda Stats
Rules for classification: 1st points; 2nd head-to-head points; 3rd head-to-head goal difference; 4th head-to-head goals scored; 5th goal difference; 6th number of goals scored; 7th Fair-play points

==== Results summary ====
| Overall | | | | | | | | Home | | | | | | Away | | | | | |
| Pld | W | D | L | GF | GA | GD | Pts | W | D | L | GF | GA | GD | W | D | L | GF | GA | GD |
|---|---|---|---|---|---|---|---|---|---|---|---|---|---|---|---|---|---|---|---|
| 42 | 17 | 6 | 19 | 65 | 63 | +2 | 57 | 13 | 2 | 6 | 45 | 29 | +16 | 4 | 4 | 13 | 20 | 34 | −14 |

==== Results by round ====
| Round | 1 | 2 | 3 | 4 | 5 | 6 | 7 | 8 | 9 | 10 | 11 | 12 | 13 | 14 | 15 | 16 | 17 | 18 | 19 | 20 | 21 | 22 | 23 | 24 | 25 | 26 | 27 | 28 | 29 | 30 | 31 | 32 | 33 | 34 | 35 | 36 | 37 | 38 | 39 | 40 | 41 | 42 |
|---|---|---|---|---|---|---|---|---|---|---|---|---|---|---|---|---|---|---|---|---|---|---|---|---|---|---|---|---|---|---|---|---|---|---|---|---|---|---|---|---|---|---|
| Ground | A | H | A | H | A | H | H | A | H | A | H | A | H | A | H | A | H | A | H | A | H | H | A | H | A | H | A | A | H | A | H | A | H | A | H | A | H | A | H | A | H | A |
| Result | L | L | L | W | L | W | D | D | W | D | W | L | W | L | L | W | L | W | W | L | W | L | L | W | L | L | L | W | W | L | W | L | W | L | L | L | D | W | W | D | W | D |
| Position | 15 | 19 | 20 | 16 | 18 | 16 | 16 | 16 | 13 | 14 | 11 | 15 | 11 | 11 | 13 | 11 | 12 | 10 | 9 | 9 | 9 | 9 | 10 | 10 | 11 | 14 | 15 | 14 | 12 | 13 | 12 | 13 | 11 | 11 | 15 | 15 | 15 | 14 | 13 | 13 | 10 | 10 |

A = Away; H = Home; W = Win; D = Draw; L = Loss

==== Matches ====
The league fixtures were unveiled on 20 July 2010.

| 29 August 2010 1 | Rayo Vallecano | 3–2 | Numancia | Madrid |
| 12:00 CEST (UTC+2) | | | | Stadium: Campo de Fútbol de Vallecas; Referee: Julio Amoedo Chas |

| 5 September 2010 2 | Numancia | 1–3 | Celta Vigo | Soria |
| 17:00 CEST (UTC+2) | | | | Stadium: Estadio Los Pajaritos; Referee: José Piñeiro |

| 12 September 2010 3 | Xerez | 1–0 | Numancia | Jerez de la Frontera |
| 17:00 CEST (UTC+2) | Jaio 12' (o.g.) | | | Stadium: Estadio Municipal de Chapín; Referee: Gregorio Bernabé |

| 18 September 2010 4 | Numancia | 2–0 | Cartagena | Soria |
| 18:00 CEST (UTC+2) | Nagore 65'; Barkero 72' | | | Stadium: Estadio Los Pajaritos; Referee: Alfonso Pino Zamorano |

| 26 September 2010 5 | Barcelona B | 1–0 | Numancia | Barcelona |
| 17:00 CEST (UTC+2) | Nolito 12' | | | Stadium: Mini Estadi; Referee: Daniel Trujillo |

| 3 October 2010 6 | Numancia | 2–0 | Elche | Soria |
| 17:00 CEST (UTC+2) | Barkero 34' (pen.); Baldé 87' | | | Stadium: Estadio Los Pajaritos; Referee: Jesús Gil Manzano |

| 10 October 2010 7 | Numancia | 1–1 | Córdoba | Soria |
| 17:00 CEST (UTC+2) | Dimas 28' | | Tena 48' | Stadium: Estadio Los Pajaritos; Referee: Pedro Sureda |

| 17 October 2010 8 | Tenerife | 1–1 | Numancia | Santa Cruz de Tenerife |
| | | | | Stadium: Estadio Heliodoro Rodríguez López |

| 24 October 2010 9 | Numancia | 1–0 | Gimnàstic de Tarragona | Soria |
| | | | | Stadium: Estadio Los Pajaritos |

| 30 October 2010 10 | Huesca | 0–0 | Numancia | Huesca |
| | | | | Stadium: El Alcoraz |

| 6 November 2010 11 | Numancia | 2–1 | Alcorcón | Soria |
| | | | | Stadium: Estadio Los Pajaritos |

| 12 November 2010 12 | Villarreal B | 1–0 | Numancia | Villarreal |
| | Falque 1' | | | Stadium: Ciudad Deportiva Villarreal CF |

| 21 November 2010 13 | Numancia | 3–2 | Granada | Soria |
| | | | | Stadium: Estadio Los Pajaritos |

| 28 November 2010 14 | Recreativo de Huelva | 1–0 | Numancia | Huelva |
| | | | | Stadium: Nuevo Colombino |

| 4 December 2010 15 | Numancia | 1–2 | Real Betis | Soria |
| | | | | Stadium: Estadio Los Pajaritos |

| 11 December 2010 16 | Valladolid | 4–5 | Numancia | Valladolid |
| | | | | Stadium: José Zorrilla |

| 18 December 2010 17 | Numancia | 0–1 | Albacete | Soria |
| | | | | Stadium: Estadio Los Pajaritos |

| 2 January 2011 18 | Ponferradina | 0–4 | Numancia | Ponferrada |
| | | | | Stadium: El Toralín |

| 8 January 2011 19 | Numancia | 4–0 | Las Palmas | Soria |
| | | | | Stadium: Estadio Los Pajaritos |

| 14 January 2011 20 | Girona | 2–0 | Numancia | Girona |
| | | | | Stadium: Montilivi |

| 23 January 2011 21 | Numancia | 3–2 | Salamanca | Soria |
| | | | | Stadium: Estadio Los Pajaritos |

| 29 January 2011 22 | Numancia | 0–3 | Rayo Vallecano | Soria |
| | | | | Stadium: Estadio Los Pajaritos |

| 7 February 2011 23 | Celta Vigo | 4–0 | Numancia | Vigo |
| | | | | Stadium: Balaídos |

| 12 February 2011 24 | Numancia | 3–0 | Xerez | Soria |
| | | | | Stadium: Estadio Los Pajaritos |

| 19 February 2011 25 | Cartagena | 1–0 | Numancia | Cartagena |
| | | | | Stadium: Balaídos |

| 26 February 2011 26 | Numancia | 4–6 | Barcelona B | Soria |
| | | | | Stadium: Estadio Los Pajaritos |

| 1 March 2011 27 | Elche | 1–0 | Numancia | Elche |
| | | | | Stadium: Estadio Martínez Valero |

| 6 March 2011 28 | Córdoba | 1–2 | Numancia | Córdoba |
| | | | | Stadium: Nuevo Arcángel |

| 12 March 2011 29 | Numancia | 2–1 | Tenerife | Soria |
| | | | | Stadium: Estadio Los Pajaritos |

| 20 March 2011 30 | Gimnàstic de Tarragona | 1–0 | Numancia | Tarragona |
| | | | | Stadium: Nou Estadi de Tarragona |

| 26 March 2011 31 | Numancia | 3–1 | Huesca | Soria |
| | | | | Stadium: Estadio Los Pajaritos |

| 3 April 2011 32 | Alcorcón | 3–1 | Numancia | Alcorcón |
| | | | | Stadium: Santo Domingo |

| 10 April 2011 33 | Numancia | 2–1 | Villarreal B | Soria |
| | | | | Stadium: Estadio Los Pajaritos |

| 16 April 2011 34 | Granada | 2–0 | Numancia | Granada |
| | | | | Stadium: Nuevo Estadio de Los Cármenes |

| 23 April 2011 35 | Numancia | 1–2 | Recreativo de Huelva | Soria |
| | | | | Stadium: Estadio Los Pajaritos |

| 30 April 2011 36 | Real Betis | 4–1 | Numancia | Seville |
| | | | | Stadium: Benito Villamarín |

| 7 May 2011 37 | Numancia | 3–3 | Valladolid | Soria |
| | | | | Stadium: Estadio Los Pajaritos |

| 11 May 2011 38 | Albacete | 1–2 | Numancia | Albacete |
| | | | | Stadium: Estadio Carlos Belmonte |

| 14 May 2011 39 | Numancia | 3–0 | Ponferradina | Soria |
| 18:00 CEST (UTC+2) | | | | Stadium: Estadio Los Pajaritos; Referee: Antonio Mariscal |

| 21 May 2011 40 | Las Palmas | 0–0 | Numancia | Las Palmas |
| 17:00 WEST (UTC+1) | | | | Stadium: Estadio Gran Canaria; Referee: Pedro Pérez |

| 29 May 2011 41 | Numancia | 4–0 | Girona | Soria |
| 19:00 CEST (UTC+2) | | | | Stadium: Estadio Los Pajaritos |

| 4 June 2011 42 | Salamanca | 2–2 | Numancia | Villares de la Reina |
| 18:00 CEST (UTC+2) | | | | Stadium: Helmántico Stadium |

=== Copa del Rey ===
| 1 September 2010 First round | Córdoba | 1–0 (a.e.t.) | Numancia | Córdoba |
| 21:00 CEST (UTC+2) | Agus (yellow card) 37'; Callejón (yellow card) 60'; Usero (yellow card) 89'; Arteaga (yellow card) 114', (goal) 114' | | Víctor Andrés (yellow card) 32'; Nano (yellow card) 40'; Eduardo (yellow card) 81' | Stadium: Nuevo Arcángel; Referee: Francisco Javier Ontanaya López |
