= 2020–21 Copa del Rey =

Tournament details
- Country: Spain
- Date: 11 November 2020 – 17 April 2021
- Teams: 126

Final positions
- Champions: Barcelona (31st title)
- Runners-up: Athletic Bilbao

Tournament statistics
- Matches played: 127
- Goals scored: 345 (2.72 per match)
- Top goal scorer: Sergio León (5 goals)

The 2020–21 Copa del Rey was the 119th staging of the Copa del Rey (including two seasons where two rival editions were played). The winners were assured a place in the 2021–22 UEFA Europa League group stage. Both the winners and the runners-up qualified for the four-team 2022 Supercopa de España.

Real Sociedad were the defending champions, having won the postponed final of the previous edition, which was held two weeks before the 2021 final. They were already eliminated by Real Betis in the round of 16 of the 2020–21 edition, before the previous final had been played. Barcelona won the final 4–0 against Athletic Bilbao for a record-extending 31st Copa del Rey title.

As across Spain, match times up to 25 October 2020 and from 28 March 2021 were CEST (UTC+2). Times on interim ("winter") days were CET (UTC+1).

== Schedule and format ==
On 14 September 2020, the RFEF released the calendar of the competition and confirmed the format of the previous season would remain.

Round	Draw date	Date	Fixtures	Clubs	Format details
Preliminary	29 October 2020	11 November 2020	10	126 → 116	New entries: Clubs qualified through the 2019–20 fifth tier. Opponents seeding: Teams faced each other according to proximity criteria. Local team seeding: Luck of the draw. Knock-out tournament type: Single match
First round	16 November 2020	16 December 2020	56	116 → 60	New entries: All qualified teams except the four participants in the Supercopa de España. Opponents seeding: Teams from La Liga faced teams from the lowest divisions. The four remaining teams faced teams from Segunda División B. Local team seeding: Match played at home of team in lower division. Knock-out tournament type: Single match.
Second round	18 December 2020	6 January 2021	28	60 → 32	Opponents seeding: Teams from lowest divisions faced La Liga teams. Local team seeding: Match played at home of team in lower division. Knock-out tournament type: Single match
Round of 32	8 January 2021	16 January 2021	16	32 → 16	New entries: Clubs participating in Supercopa de España gained entry. Opponents seeding: Teams from lowest divisions faced La Liga teams. Local team seeding: Match played at home of team in lower division. Knock-out tournament type: Single match.
Round of 16	22 January 2021	27 January 2021	8	16 → 8	Opponents seeding: Teams from lowest divisions faced La Liga teams. Local team seeding: Match played at home of team in lower division. Knock-out tournament type: Single match.
Quarter-finals	29 January 2021	3 February 2021	4	8 → 4	Opponents seeding: Luck of the draw. Local team seeding: Match played at home of team in lower division. Knock-out tournament type: Single match.
Semi-finals	5 February 2021	10 February 2021	2	4 → 2	Opponents seeding: Luck of the draw. Local team seeding: Luck of the draw. Knock-out tournament type: Double match.
Semi-finals	5 February 2021	3 March 2021	2	4 → 2	Opponents seeding: Luck of the draw. Local team seeding: Luck of the draw. Knock-out tournament type: Double match.
Final		17 April 2021	1	2 → 1	Single match at Estadio de La Cartuja, Seville. Both teams qualified for the 2022 Supercopa de España. UEFA Europa League qualification: winners qualified for the 2021–22 UEFA Europa League group stage.**

Notes

- The semi-finals used the away goals rule.
- Games ending in a draw were decided in extra time, and if still level, by a penalty shoot-out.

== Qualified teams ==
The following teams qualified for the competition. Reserve teams were excluded.

La Liga; All 20 teams of the 2019–20 season	Segunda División; All 22 teams of the 2019–20 season	Segunda División B The top seven teams of each one of the four groups of the 2019–20 season, excluding reserve teams	Tercera División; The best team of each one of the eighteen groups of the 2019–20 season plus the best fourteen runners-up, excluding reserve teams	Copa Federación; The four semifinalists of the 2020 Copa Federación de España	Regional leagues The winners of the twenty groups of the fifth tier in the 2019–20 season
Alavés; Athletic Bilbao (Note: Athletic Bilbao, Barcelona, Real Madrid and Real Sociedad joined the tournament in the round of 32, as participants of the Supercopa de España.); Atlético Madrid; Barcelona; Celta Vigo; Eibar; Espanyol; Getafe; Granada; Leganés; Levante; Mallorca; Osasuna; Real Betis; Real Madrid; Real Sociedad^{TH}; Sevilla; Valencia; Valladolid; Villarreal	Albacete; Alcorcón; Almería; Cádiz; Deportivo La Coruña; Elche; Extremadura; Fuenlabrada; Girona; Huesca; Las Palmas; Lugo; Málaga; Mirandés; Numancia; Ponferradina; Rayo Vallecano; Oviedo; Racing Santander; Sporting Gijón; Tenerife; Zaragoza	Amorebieta; Andorra; Atlético Baleares; Badajoz; Burgos; Calahorra; Cartagena; Castellón; Córdoba; Cornellà; Cultural Leonesa; Coruxo; Guijuelo; Haro; Ibiza; Internacional; La Nucía; Linense; Lleida Esportiu; Marbella; Olot; Peña Deportiva; Pontevedra; Rayo Majadahonda; Sabadell; San Fernando; UD Logroñés; Yeclano	Alcoyano; Atlético Pulpileño; Ciudad de Lucena; Compostela; Coria; El Ejido; Gimnástica Segoviana; Gimnástica Torrelavega; Ibiza Islas Pitiusas; L'Hospitalet; Laredo; Lealtad; Linares; Llanera; Lorca Deportiva; Marino; Mutilvera; Navalcarnero; Ourense CF; Poblense; Portugalete; Quintanar del Rey; San Juan; SD Logroñés; Sestao River; Socuéllamos; Tarazona; Terrassa; Teruel; Varea; Villanovense; Zamora	Las Rozas; Leioa; Llagostera; UCAM Murcia	Anaitasuna; AUGC Deportiva; Buñol; Cantolagua; Cardassar; Chinato; Colegios Diocesanos; Épila; Guía; Marchamalo; Miengo; Montañesa; Móstoles; Racing Murcia; Racing Rioja; Ribadumia; Rincón; Rusadir; Titánico; Tomares

== Preliminary round ==
=== Draw ===
Teams were divided into four groups according to geographical criteria.

Group 1	Group 2	Group 3	Group 4
Anaitasuna; Colegios Diocesanos; Miengo; Racing Rioja; Ribadumia; Titánico	Cantolagua; Cardassar; Épila; Montañesa	AUGC Deportiva; Chinato; Racing Murcia; Rincón; Rusadir; Tomares	Buñol; Guía; Marchamalo; Móstoles

=== Matches ===
11 November 2020	Rusadir (5)	1–2	Rincón (5)	Melilla
18:00	Mohamed 9' (pen.); Farid I 25' (pen.)	Report	Johnson 21'	Stadium: La Espiguera; Referee: Carlos Agraz Díaz

11 November 2020	AUGC Deportiva (5)	0–3	Racing Murcia (4)	Ceuta
18:30		Report	Sergi Valls 10'; Carlos Álvarez 48'; Nico 65'	Stadium: Alfonso Murube; Attendance: 0 Referee: Jorge González Sánchez

11 November 2020	Titánico (4)	0–2	Anaitasuna (4)	El Entrego (Note: Titánico played this game at Nuevo Nalón instead of their regular stadium Las Tolvas, in Laviana, as it did not have floodlights.)
19:00		Report	Mikel 62' (pen.), 89'	Stadium: Nuevo Nalón; Referee: Carlos Cañibano Arias

11 November 2020	Racing Rioja (4)	3–0	Colegios Diocesanos (4)	Logroño
19:00	Rubio 77'; Arana 80'; Tenorio 90'	Report		Stadium: El Salvador; Referee: Gaizka Legarra Gorgoñon

11 November 2020	Montañesa (4)	0–1	Cantolagua (4)	Barcelona
19:00		Report	Beñat 71'	Stadium: Municipal Nou Barris; Referee: Borja Guijarro Colomer

11 November 2020	Cardassar (4)	0–0 (4–3 p)	Épila (4)	Sant Llorenç des Cardassar
19:00		Report		Stadium: Es Moleter; Attendance: 300; Referee: Alfonso Ros Gómez
	Penalties
	Ramis (penalty scored); Hernández (penalty scored); Llull (penalty scored); López (penalty scored)		(penalty scored) Luis Costa; (penalty scored) Falo; (penalty missed) Berdún; (penalty scored) Turrubia; (penalty missed) Redondo

11 November 2020	Tomares (5)	3–0	Chinato (4)	Tomares
19:30	Gil 54'; Mesa 56', 79' (pen.)	Report		Stadium: San Sebastián; Referee: Salvador Alcaraz Yáñez

11 November 2020	Miengo (5)	0–1	Ribadumia (4)	Miengo
20:00		Report	Aval 75'	Stadium: Cuchía; Referee: Jon Ander Azkuenaga Astorkiza

11 November 2020	Móstoles (4)	0–0 (4–5 p)	Marchamalo (4)	Móstoles
20:00		Report		Stadium: El Soto; Attendance: 550; Referee: Usama Sebti Mohtar
	Penalties
	Helmer (penalty missed); Rubén Muñoz (penalty scored); José Ángel (penalty scored); Abraham (penalty scored); Mario Duque (penalty scored)		(penalty scored) Josemi; (penalty scored) Peñalvo; (penalty scored) Guille; (penalty scored) Daniyo; (penalty scored) Capi

11 November 2020	Guía (4)	0–1	Buñol (5)	Santa María de Guía
21:30 (20:30 WET)		Report	Albert 75'	Stadium: Octavio Estévez; Referee: Cristian Sánchez Moraga

== First round ==
The first round was played by all the qualified teams, except for the four participants of the 2021 Supercopa de España. The ten winners from the previous preliminary round were paired with ten teams from La Liga. The remaining six teams and the 22 teams of the Segunda División were paired with the four Copa Federación semi-finalists, the fourteen teams that competed in the Tercera División and ten teams from Segunda B. Finally, the remaining 36 teams from Segunda B were paired between them. In the case of opponents from the same division, the home advantage was decided by whichever team was drawn first; otherwise, the match was held in the stadium of the lower division team. A total of 56 games were played, with 112 participating teams, from 15 to 30 December 2020.

=== Draw ===
The draw was held on 16 November at the Estadio de La Cartuja, Seville. Teams were divided into five pots.

Pot 1; 10 winners of the preliminary round	Pot 2; 16 teams of La Liga	Pot 3; 14 runners-up of Tercera División and 4 teams qualified through the Copa Federación	Pot 4; 22 teams of Segunda División	Pot 5; 28 teams of Segunda División B and 18 group winners of Tercera División
Anaitasuna; Buñol; Cantolagua; Cardassar; Marchamalo; Racing Murcia; Racing Rioja; Ribadumia; Rincón; Tomares	Alavés; Atlético Madrid; Cádiz; Celta Vigo; Eibar; Elche; Getafe; Granada; Huesca; Levante; Osasuna; Real Betis; Sevilla; Valencia; Valladolid; Villarreal	Atlético Pulpileño; Ciudad de Lucena; Coria; Gimnástica Segoviana; Gimnástica Torrelavega; Ibiza Islas Pitiusas; Las Rozas; Leioa; Llagostera; Llanera; Ourense CF; Quintanar del Rey; San Juan; Sestao River; Terrassa; Teruel; UCAM Murcia; Varea	Albacete; Alcorcón; Almería; Cartagena; Castellón; Espanyol; Fuenlabrada; Girona; Las Palmas; Leganés; Lugo; Málaga; Mallorca; Mirandés; Ponferradina; Rayo Vallecano; Oviedo; Sabadell; Sporting Gijón; Tenerife; Zaragoza; UD Logroñés	Alcoyano; Amorebieta; Andorra; Atlético Baleares; Badajoz; Burgos; Calahorra; Compostela; Córdoba; Cornellà; Cultural Leonesa; Coruxo; Deportivo La Coruña; El Ejido; Extremadura; Guijuelo; Haro; Ibiza; Internacional; L'Hospitalet; La Nucía; Laredo; Lealtad; Linares; Linense; Lleida Esportiu; Lorca Deportiva; Marbella; Marino; Mutilvera; Navalcarnero; Numancia; Olot; Peña Deportiva; Poblense; Pontevedra; Portugalete; Racing Santander; Rayo Majadahonda; San Fernando; SD Logroñés; Socuéllamos; Tarazona; Villanovense; Yeclano; Zamora

=== Matches ===
15 December 2020	Atlético Pulpileño (4)	1–2	Lugo (2)	Pulpí
18:00	P. Montero 67'	Report	El Hacen 57', 88'	Stadium: San Miguel; Referee: Rafael Sánchez López

15 December 2020	Marchamalo (4)	2–3 (a.e.t.)	Huesca (1)	Marchamalo
19:00	Fernández 63'; Cerro 118'	Report	Mir 9', 94', 111'	Stadium: La Solana; Referee: José Luis Munuera Montero

15 December 2020	Tomares (5)	0–6	Osasuna (1)	Sevilla (Note: Tomares did not play its game in its main stadium San Sebastián, in Tomares, as it did not meet the requirements to broadcast the match.)
19:00		Report	Barja 23', 83'; Roncaglia 30'; Gallego 49' (pen.); Saverio 69'; Calleri 89'	Stadium: La Cartuja; Referee: Valentín Pizarro Gómez

15 December 2020	Cantolagua (4)	0–5	Valladolid (1)	Estella (Note: Cantolagua did not play its game in its main stadium Municipal, in Sangüesa, as it did not meet the requirements to broadcast the match.)
19:00		Report	Toni 31', 64'; Jota 37'; Zalazar 55'; Alcaraz 88'	Stadium: Merkatondoa; Referee: Ricardo De Burgos Bengoetxea

15 December 2020	Sestao River (4)	0–2 (a.e.t.)	Tenerife (2)	Sestao
19:00		Report	Shashoua 99'; Apeh 103'	Stadium: Las Llanas; Referee: Daniel Ocón Arráiz

15 December 2020	Portugalete (3)	1–0	Ponferradina (2)	Portugalete
19:00	Valero 73'	Report		Stadium: La Florida; Referee: Iosu Galech Apezteguía

15 December 2020	Ciudad de Lucena (4)	0–3	Sevilla (1)	Lucena
20:00		Report	Óscar 2'; De Jong 14'; Jordán 45' (pen.)	Stadium: Ciudad de Lucena; Referee: Javier Alberola Rojas

15 December 2020	Ourense CF (4)	0–1 (a.e.t.)	Leganés (2)	Ourense
20:00		Report	Gonzales 102'	Stadium: O Couto; Referee: Iñaki Vicandi Garrido

15 December 2020	Coria (4)	2–3	Oviedo (2)	Coria
20:30	Fernández 17'; Mahíllo 56'	Report	Rozada 41'; Mújica 43', 77'	Stadium: La Isla; Referee: Luis Mario Milla Alvendiz

16 December 2020	Coruxo (3)	0–4	Málaga (2)	Vigo
15:15		Report	Sá 18'; Juan Cruz 65'; Rahmani 76'; Quintana 90+2'	Stadium: O Vao; Referee: Jon Ander González Esteban

16 December 2020	Lealtad (3)	1–2	Alcorcón (2)	Villaviciosa
15:30	Blanco 89'	Report	Reko 3'; Sosa 60'	Stadium: Les Caleyes; Referee: Alejandro Muñiz Ruiz

16 December 2020	Burgos (3)	2–0	Andorra (3)	Burgos
16:00	Gómez 57'; Berjón 90+1'	Report		Stadium: El Plantío; Referee: David Iglesias Gutiérrez

16 December 2020	Quintanar del Rey (4)	1–2	Sporting Gijón (2)	Albacete (Note: Quintanar del Rey did not play its game in its main stadium San Marcos, in Quintanar del Rey, for avoiding to play behind closed doors due to the COVID-19 pandemic.)
18:00	Ricar 47'	Report	Čumić 63'; López 90'	Stadium: Ciudad Deportiva Andrés Iniesta; Referee: Miguel Ángel Ortiz Arias

16 December 2020	L'Hospitalet (3)	1–4	Almería (2)	L'Hospitalet de Llobregat
18:00	Carmona 46'	Report	Appiah 26'; Diego 39' (o.g.); Ramazani 89'; Aketxe 90+2'	Stadium: Municipal; Referee: José Antonio López Toca

16 December 2020	San Fernando (3)	0–2	Castellón (2)	San Fernando
18:00		Report	Fernandes 35'; Muñoz 37'	Stadium: Iberoamericano; Referee: Dámaso Arcediano Monescillo

16 December 2020	Córdoba (3)	1–0	Albacete (2)	Córdoba
18:00	Gorosito 63' (o.g.)	Report		Stadium: Nuevo Arcángel; Referee: Javier Iglesias Villanueva

16 December 2020	Numancia (3)	4–1	Lorca Deportiva (3)	Soria
18:30	Moha 28'; Tamayo 41'; Manzanara 66'; Corral 90+1'	Report	Baroni 59'	Stadium: Los Pajaritos; Referee: Sergio Usón Rosel

16 December 2020	Racing Murcia (4)	0–5	Levante (1)	Lorca (Note: Racing Murcia did not play its game in its main stadium Municipal de Dolores de Pacheco, in Torre-Pacheco, as it did not meet the requirements to broadcast the match.)
19:00		Report	León 24', 33', 64'; Kochorashvili 87'; Coke 90+1'	Stadium: Francisco Artés Carrasco; Referee: Isidro Díaz de Mera Escuderos

16 December 2020	Cardassar (4)	0–3	Atlético Madrid (1)	Sant Llorenç des Cardassar
19:00		Report	Lemar 24'; Sánchez 42'; Vrsaljko 83'	Stadium: Es Moleter; Referee: Jorge Figueroa Vázquez

16 December 2020	Terrassa (4)	2–4 (a.e.t.)	Valencia (1)	Terrassa
19:00	Pascual 9'; Fernández 50'	Report	Soler 83' (pen.); Musah 90+1'; Guedes 103', 108'	Stadium: Olímpic; Referee: Guillermo Cuadra Fernández

16 December 2020	Las Rozas (3)	1–0	Mirandés (2)	Las Rozas
19:00	Carrasco 10'	Report		Stadium: Navalcarbón; Referee: Juan Luis Pulido Santana

16 December 2020	Llagostera (3)	0–1 (a.e.t.)	Espanyol (2)	Llagostera
19:00		Report	Puado 93'	Stadium: Municipal; Referee: Daniel Jesús Trujillo Suárez

16 December 2020	Ibiza Islas Pitiusas (4)	0–2	Sabadell (2)	Ibiza
19:00		Report	Querol 79'; Stoichkov 90'	Stadium: Can Misses; Referee: Saúl Ais Reig

16 December 2020	Atlético Baleares (3)	0–1	Fuenlabrada (2)	Palma
19:00		Report	Awudu 64'	Stadium: Balear; Referee: Rubén Ávalos Barrera

16 December 2020	Amorebieta (3)	1–0	UD Logroñés (2)	Amorebieta
19:00	Álvaro 45'	Report		Stadium: Urritxe; Referee: David Gálvez Rascón

16 December 2020	Internacional (3)	0–3	Linares (3)	Villaviciosa de Odón
19:00		Report	Carnicer 16'; Chendo 54', 88'	Stadium: Municipal; Referee: Andrés Fuentes Molina

16 December 2020	Gimnástica Torrelavega (4)	0–2 (a.e.t.)	Zaragoza (2)	Torrelavega
19:00		Report	Azón 100'; Serrano 106'	Stadium: El Malecón; Referee: Gorka Sagués Oscoz

16 December 2020	Guijuelo (3)	0–1	Mallorca (2)	Guijuelo
19:30		Report	Abdón 73'	Stadium: Luis Ramos; Referee: Francisco José Hernández Maeso

16 December 2020	Rayo Majadahonda (3)	1–2 (a.e.t.)	Yeclano (3)	Majadahonda
19:30	Núñez 64'	Report	Saura 60'; Vaquero 120+1'	Stadium: Cerro del Espino

16 December 2020	Marbella (3)	1–0 (a.e.t.)	Lleida Esportiu (3)	Marbella
20:00	Añón 104' (pen.)	Report		Stadium: Antonio Lorenzo Cuevas; Referee: Alejandro Patiño Álvarez

16 December 2020	Calahorra (3)	0–1	La Nucía (3)	Calahorra
20:30		Report	Morgado 62'	Stadium: La Planilla; Referee: Albert Ávalos Martos

16 December 2020	Buñol (5)	1–2	Elche (1)	Buñol (Note: Buñol did not play its game in its main stadium Beltrán Báguena, in Buñol, as it did not meet the requirements to broadcast the match.)
21:00	Calvo 12' (o.g.)	Report	Nino 66'; Rigoni 72'	Stadium: Ciudad Deportiva Levante UD; Referee: Mario Melero López

16 December 2020	Rincón (5)	0–2	Alavés (1)	Málaga (Note: Rincón did not play its game in its main stadium Francisco Romero, in Rincón de la Victoria, as it did not meet the requirements to broadcast the match.)
21:00		Report	Guidetti 32', 59'	Stadium: La Rosaleda; Referee: Juan Martínez Munuera

16 December 2020	Leioa (3)	0–6	Villarreal (1)	Leioa
21:00		Report	Pino 6'; Niño 20' (pen.); Costa 60'; Chakla 66'; Millán 81'; Pedraza 90+2'	Stadium: Sarriena; Referee: Xavier Estrada Fernández

16 December 2020	Marino (3)	0–1	Cornellà (3)	Arona
23:30 (22:30 WET)		Report	Plà 66'	Stadium: Antonio Domínguez Alfonso; Referee: Alejandro Quintero González

17 December 2020	Deportivo La Coruña (3)	1–0	El Ejido (3)	La Coruña
17:00	Hernández 13'	Report		Stadium: Riazor; Referee: Leandro Carbajales Gómez

17 December 2020	Navalcarnero (3)	1–0	Badajoz (3)	Navalcarnero
18:00	Esnáider 31'	Report		Stadium: Mariano González; Referee: Juan Manuel Ruíz Aguilera

17 December 2020	Anaitasuna (4)	1–2	Getafe (1)	Azkoitia
19:00	Eskurtza 55'	Report	Ünal 73'; Ángel 90+4' (pen.)	Stadium: Txerloia; Referee: Adrián Cordero Vega

17 December 2020	Ribadumia (4)	0–2	Cádiz (1)	Ribadumia
19:00		Report	Garrido 33'; Malbašić 52'	Stadium: Novo a Senra; Referee: Pablo González Fuertes

17 December 2020	San Juan (4)	0–2	Granada (1)	Pamplona
19:00		Report	Kenedy 1'; Molina 26'	Stadium: Donibane; Referee: Alejandro Hernández Hernández

17 December 2020	Gimnástica Segoviana (4)	0–2	Girona (2)	Segovia
19:00		Report	Bustos 39', 77'	Stadium: La Albuera; Referee: Álvaro Moreno Aragón

17 December 2020	Teruel (4)	2–3 (a.e.t.)	Rayo Vallecano (2)	Teruel
19:00	Otín 90+4'; Hualde 103'	Report	Martos 38'; Antoñín 93'; Valentín 119'	Stadium: La Pinilla; Referee: Eduardo Prieto Iglesias

17 December 2020	Ibiza (3)	2–1 (a.e.t.)	Compostela (3)	Ibiza
19:00	Sibo 6'; Castel 106'	Report	Abelenda 20'	Stadium: Can Misses; Referee: Juan Antonio Campos Salinas

17 December 2020	Cultural Leonesa (3)	1–0	Villanovense (3)	León
19:00	Dioni 42'	Report		Stadium: Reino de León; Referee: Alexandre López Vila

17 December 2020	Mutilvera (3)	1–0	Racing Santander (3)	Aranguren
19:00	Briñol 76'	Report		Stadium: Mutilnova; Referee: Adrián Calvo Martínez

17 December 2020	UCAM Murcia (3)	0–2	Real Betis (1)	Murcia
19:30		Report	Montoya 44'; Rodríguez 74'	Stadium: La Condomina; Referee: David Medié Jiménez

17 December 2020	Peña Deportiva (3)	4–1	Tarazona (3)	Santa Eulària des Riu
19:30	López 35' (pen.), 84'; A. Sánchez 59', 70'	Report	L. Sánchez 43' (pen.)	Stadium: Municipal; Referee: Fernando Bueno Prieto

17 December 2020	Varea (4)	0–4	Las Palmas (2)	Varea
20:00		Report	Cedrés 7'; Lemos 34'; Iemmello 35'; Curbelo 66'	Stadium: Municipal; Referee: Aitor Gorostegui Fernández-Ortega

17 December 2020	Pontevedra (3)	2–1	Cartagena (2)	Pontevedra
20:00	González 24'; Calvillo 65'	Report	Elady 82'	Stadium: Pasarón; Referee: Óliver de la Fuente Ramos

17 December 2020	Alcoyano (3)	4–1	Laredo (3)	Alcoy
20:15	Jony 6'; Mourad 34'; Juanan 50'; López 63' (pen.)	Report	Altadill 45'	Stadium: El Collao; Referee: Gerard Brull Acerete

17 December 2020	Extremadura (3)	1–2	Socuéllamos (3)	Almendralejo
20:30	Mesa 85'	Report	Domínguez 32'; Morros 72'	Stadium: Francisco de la Hera; Referee: Eder Mallo Fernández

17 December 2020	Racing Rioja (4)	0–2	Eibar (1)	Haro (Note: Racing Rioja did not play its game in its main stadium El Salvador, in Logroño, as it did not meet the requirements to broadcast the match.)
21:00		Report	León 36', 82'	Stadium: El Mazo; Referee: Santiago Jaime Latre

17 December 2020	Llanera (4)	0–5	Celta Vigo (1)	Oviedo (Note: Llanera did not play its game in its main stadium Pepe Quimarán, in Llanera, as it did not meet the requirements to broadcast the match.)
21:00		Report	De León 41'; Nolito 54', 75'; Mor 60'; Mallo 83'	Stadium: Carlos Tartiere; Referee: César Soto Grado

23 December 2020 (Note: The match, originally scheduled for 16 December 2020, was postponed due to a number of RB Linense players and staff being tested positive for COVID-19.)	Haro (3)	2–1	Linense (3)	Haro
18:30	Bueno 43'; Garrido 90+4'	Report	Camacho 23' (pen.)	Stadium: El Mazo; Referee: Antonio Monter Solans

23 December 2020 (Note: The match, originally scheduled for 16 December 2020, was postponed due to a number of SD Logroñés players being tested positive for COVID-19.)	Zamora (3)	2–1	SD Logroñés (3)	Zamora
19:00	Hernández 28' (pen.); Vallejo 61'	Report	Etxeberría 90+1'	Stadium: Ruta de la Plata; Referee: Sergio Del Rio Lozano

30 December 2020 (Note: The match, originally scheduled for 16 December 2020, was postponed due to a number of Poblense players being tested positive for COVID-19.)	Poblense (3)	1–2	Olot (3)	Sa Pobla
12:00	Fernández 54'	Report	Xumetra 38'; Barnils 47'	Stadium: Nou Camp; Referee: Francisco José Ortega Herrera

== Second round ==
=== Draw ===
The draw was held on 18 December in the RFEF headquarters in Las Rozas. Teams were divided into four pots according to their division in the 2020–21 season. Tercera División teams were drawn with others from La Liga, while the remaining Segunda B and Tercera teams were drawn with teams from La Liga and Segunda División. Matches were played at the home of the lower-ranked team.

Pot 1; 1 team qualified through the Copa Federación	Pot 2; 22 teams of Segunda División B	Pot 3; 17 teams of Segunda División	Pot 4; 16 teams of La Liga
Las Rozas	Alcoyano; Amorebieta; Burgos; Córdoba; Cornellà; Cultural Leonesa; Deportivo La Coruña; Haro†; Ibiza; La Nucía; Linares; Marbella; Mutilvera; Navalcarnero; Numancia; Olot†; Peña Deportiva; Pontevedra; Portugalete; Socuéllamos; Yeclano; Zamora†	Alcorcón; Almería; Castellón; Espanyol; Fuenlabrada; Girona; Las Palmas; Leganés; Lugo; Málaga; Mallorca; Oviedo; Rayo Vallecano; Sabadell; Sporting Gijón; Tenerife; Zaragoza	Alavés; Atlético Madrid; Cádiz; Celta Vigo; Eibar; Elche; Getafe; Granada; Huesca; Levante; Osasuna; Real Betis; Sevilla; Valencia; Valladolid; Villarreal

† The identity of this team was unknown at the time of the draw

=== Matches ===
5 January 2021	Ibiza (3)	5–2	Celta Vigo (1)	Ibiza
17:00	Castel 12', 27'; Ja. Pérez 28'; Molina 61' (pen.); Rodado 90+3'	Report	Mina 78'; Holsgrove 87'	Stadium: Can Misses; Referee: Juan Martínez Munuera

5 January 2021	Córdoba (3)	1–0	Getafe (1)	Córdoba
17:00	Willy 6'	Report		Stadium: Nuevo Arcángel; Referee: Alejandro Hernández Hernández

5 January 2021	Linares (3)	0–2	Sevilla (1)	Linares
19:00		Report	Óscar 45+1'; Lara 47' (o.g.)	Stadium: Linarejos; Referee: Isidro Díaz de Mera Escuderos

5 January 2021	Zamora (3)	1–4	Villarreal (1)	Zamora
19:00	Ramos 45+2'	Report	Bacca 31'; Pino 43'; Niño 73'; Raba 88'	Stadium: Ruta de la Plata; Referee: Valentín Pizarro Gómez

5 January 2021	Marbella (3)	2–3 (a.e.t.)	Valladolid (1)	Marbella
21:00	Granero 60' (pen.); Gudiño 90+1'	Report	Zalazar 52'; Plano 74', 110'	Stadium: Antonio Lorenzo Cuevas; Referee: Javier Alberola Rojas

5 January 2021	Alcorcón (2)	2–1	Zaragoza (2)	Alcorcón
21:00	Ernesto 42'; León 89'	Report	Raí 4'	Stadium: Santo Domingo; Referee: Rubén Ávalos Barrera

6 January 2021	Portugalete (3)	1–2	Levante (1)	Portugalete
12:00	Musy 62'	Report	León 29', 90+3'	Stadium: La Florida; Referee: Adrián Cordero Vega

6 January 2021	La Nucía (3)	0–1	Elche (1)	La Nucía
12:00		Report	Boyé 46'	Stadium: Camilo Cano; Referee: David Medié Jiménez

6 January 2021	Numancia (3)	1–2	Almería (2)	Soria
12:00	Menudo 58' (pen.)	Report	Robertone 44', 90+2'	Stadium: Los Pajaritos; Referee: Iosu Galech Apezteguía

6 January 2021	Socuéllamos (3)	0–2	Leganés (2)	Socuéllamos
13:00		Report	Bua 7'; Miguel 8'	Stadium: Paquito Jiménez; Referee: Gorka Sagués Oscoz

6 January 2021	Mutilvera (3)	1–3	Real Betis (1)	Aranguren
17:00	Briñol 5'	Report	Miranda 35'; Emerson 37'; Juanmi 61'	Stadium: Mutilnova; Referee: Santiago Jaime Latre

6 January 2021	Cultural Leonesa (3)	1–2 (a.e.t.)	Granada (1)	León
17:00	Rovirola 3'	Report	Molina 19'; Machís 116'	Stadium: Reino de León; Referee: Xavier Estrada Fernández

6 January 2021	Haro (3)	1–3	Rayo Vallecano (2)	Haro
17:00	Jon Iru 65'	Report	Qasmi 26', 45'; Martín 72'	Stadium: El Mazo; Referee: Dámaso Arcediano Monescillo

6 January 2021	Navalcarnero (3)	1–0	Las Palmas (2)	Navalcarnero
17:00	Guerreiro 90'	Report		Stadium: Mariano González; Referee: Javier Iglesias Villanueva

6 January 2021	Cornellà (3)	1–0	Atlético Madrid (1)	Cornellà de Llobregat
18:00	Jiménez 7'	Report		Stadium: Nou Camp Municipal; Referee: Guillermo Cuadra Fernández

6 January 2021	Olot (3)	0–3	Osasuna (1)	Olot
19:00		Report	Oier 2'; Budimir 65'; Barja 90+1' (pen.)	Stadium: Municipal; Referee: José María Sánchez Martínez

6 January 2021	Deportivo La Coruña (3)	0–1	Alavés (1)	La Coruña
19:00		Report	Rioja 75'	Stadium: Riazor; Referee: Pablo González Fuertes

6 January 2021	Burgos (3)	0–2	Espanyol (2)	Burgos
19:00		Report	Wu Lei 57'; Svensson 90+3'	Stadium: El Plantío; Referee: José Antonio López Toca

6 January 2021	Castellón (2)	0–2	Tenerife (2)	Castellón
20:00		Report	Vada 4'; Ruiz 45'	Stadium: Castàlia; Referee: Alejandro Muñiz Ruiz

6 January 2021	Fuenlabrada (2)	2–2 (a.e.t.) (7–6 p)	Mallorca (2)	Fuenlabrada
21:00	Diéguez 55'; González 100' (o.g.)	Report	Trajkovski 11'; Abdón 115'	Stadium: Fernando Torres; Referee: Luis Mario Milla Alvendiz
	Penalties
	Mula (penalty scored); Kanté (penalty scored); Nteka (penalty scored); Franchu (penalty missed); Diéguez (penalty scored); Ciss (penalty scored); Sotillos (penalty scored); Glauder (penalty scored)		(penalty scored) Sevilla; (penalty scored) Junior; (penalty scored) Murilo; (penalty scored) Abdón; (penalty missed) Cufré; (penalty scored) Gámez; (penalty scored) Russo; (penalty missed) Sánchez

6 January 2021	Málaga (2)	1–0 (a.e.t.)	Oviedo (2)	Málaga
21:00	Chavarría 118'	Report		Stadium: La Rosaleda; Referee: Juan Luis Pulido Santana

7 January 2021	Peña Deportiva (3)	0–0 (a.e.t.) (2–0 p)	Sabadell (2)	Santa Eulària des Riu
19:00		Report		Stadium: Municipal; Referee: Aitor Gorostegui Fernández-Ortega
	Penalties
	Cruz (penalty scored); De Val (penalty scored); Gilbert (penalty missed); Cristeto (penalty missed)		(penalty missed) Guruzeta; (penalty missed) Boniquet; (penalty missed) Querol; (penalty missed) Martínez

7 January 2021	Amorebieta (3)	0–1	Sporting Gijón (2)	Amorebieta
19:00		Report	Salvador 74'	Stadium: Urritxe; Referee: Daniel Jesús Trujillo Suárez

7 January 2021	Pontevedra (3)	0–0 (a.e.t.) (4–5 p)	Cádiz (1)	Pontevedra
19:00		Report		Stadium: Pasarón; Referee: César Soto Grado
	Penalties
	Campos (penalty scored); Rufo (penalty scored); Calvillo (penalty scored); González (penalty scored); Vázquez (penalty missed)		(penalty scored) Malbašić; (penalty scored) Pombo; (penalty scored) Lozano; (penalty scored) Akapo; (penalty scored) Adekanye

7 January 2021	Yeclano (3)	1–4	Valencia (1)	Yecla
19:00	Oca 46'	Report	Lee Kang-in 7'; Račić 9'; Sobrino 34'; Correia 53'	Stadium: La Constitución; Referee: Ricardo De Burgos Bengoetxea

7 January 2021	Girona (2)	2–1 (a.e.t.)	Lugo (2)	Girona
19:00	Marcelo 115' (o.g.); Bueno 120+3'	Report	Ramos 103'	Stadium: Montilivi; Referee: Eduardo Prieto Iglesias

7 January 2021	Alcoyano (3)	2–1	Huesca (1)	Alcoy
21:00	Mourad 16'; Moltó 85'	Report	Seoane 38'	Stadium: El Collao; Referee: Jorge Figueroa Vázquez

7 January 2021	Las Rozas (3)	3–4 (a.e.t.)	Eibar (1)	Las Rozas
21:00	Losada 73'; Mingo 76'; Galvan 79'	Report	Muto 14'; Quique 18'; León 69'; Enrich 108'	Stadium: Navalcarbón; Referee: Mario Melero López

== Final phase ==
=== Bracket ===
Round of 32
Sporting Gijón	0
Real Betis	2
Córdoba	0
Real Sociedad	2
Alcoyano (a.e.t.)	2
Real Madrid	1
Ibiza	1
Athletic Bilbao	2
Peña Deportiva	1
Valladolid (a.e.t.)	4
Fuenlabrada	1 (2)
Levante (p)	1 (4)
Girona	2
Cádiz	0
Tenerife	0
Villarreal	1
Almería	5
Alavés	0
Espanyol	0
Osasuna	2
Leganés	0
Sevilla (a.e.t.)	1
Alcorcón	0
Valencia	2
Navalcarnero	3
Eibar	1
Málaga	1
Granada	2
Rayo Vallecano	2
Elche	0
Cornellà	0
Barcelona (a.e.t.)	2

Round of 16
Real Betis (a.e.t.)	3
Real Sociedad	1
Alcoyano	1
Athletic Bilbao	2
Valladolid	2
Levante	4
Girona	0
Villarreal	1
Almería (p)	0 (5)
Osasuna	0 (4)
Sevilla	3
Valencia	0
Navalcarnero	0
Granada	6
Rayo Vallecano	1
Barcelona	2

Quarter-finals
Real Betis	1 (1)
Athletic Bilbao (p)	1 (4)
Levante (a.e.t.)	1
Villarreal	0
Almería	0
Sevilla	1
Granada	3
Barcelona (a.e.t.)	5

Semi-finals
Athletic Bilbao (a.e.t.)	1	2	3
Levante	1	1	2
Sevilla	2	0	2
Barcelona (a.e.t.)	0	3	3

Final
Athletic Bilbao	0
Barcelona	4

== Round of 32 ==
=== Draw ===
The four participant teams of the 2021 Supercopa de España were drawn with the teams from the lowest category. After them, the remaining teams from the lowest categories faced the rest of La Liga teams. Matches were played at the home of the lower-ranked team, with exceptions due to Storm Filomena noted below. The draw was held on 8 January 2021.

Pot 1; 6 teams of Segunda División B	Pot 2; 4 participants in 2021 Supercopa de España	Pot 3; 12 teams of La Liga	Pot 4; 10 teams of Segunda División
Alcoyano; Córdoba; Cornellà; Ibiza; Navalcarnero; Peña Deportiva	Athletic Bilbao; Barcelona; Real Madrid; Real Sociedad	Alavés; Cádiz; Eibar; Elche; Granada; Levante; Osasuna; Real Betis; Sevilla; Valencia; Valladolid; Villarreal	Alcorcón; Almería; Espanyol; Fuenlabrada; Girona; Leganés; Málaga; Rayo Vallecano; Sporting Gijón; Tenerife

=== Matches ===
16 January 2021	Peña Deportiva (3)	1–4 (a.e.t.)	Valladolid (1)	Santa Eulària des Riu
12:00	Andrada 13'	Report	Míchel 62' (pen.); Mesa 96' (pen.), 112'; Plano 116'	Stadium: Municipal; Referee: David Medié Jiménez

16 January 2021	Almería (2)	5–0	Alavés (1)	Almería
12:00	Sadiq 8', 45+1'; Aketxe 45'; Battaglia 52' (o.g.); Villar 81' (pen.)	Report		Stadium: Juegos Mediterráneos; Referee: Javier Alberola Rojas

16 January 2021	Girona (2)	2–0	Cádiz (1)	Girona
16:00	Valery 48', 58'	Report		Stadium: Montilivi; Referee: Valentín Pizarro Gómez

16 January 2021	Fuenlabrada (2)	1–1 (a.e.t.) (2–4 p)	Levante (1)	Las Rozas (Note: Given the impossibility of being able to play the match at the Fernando Torres stadium in Fuenlabrada due to the consequences of Storm Filomena.)
18:00	Garcés 68'	Report	Glauder 19' (o.g.)	Stadium: La Ciudad del Fútbol; Referee: Santiago Jaime Latre
	Penalties
	Iribas (penalty scored); Pinchi (penalty scored); Garcés (penalty missed); Cristóbal (penalty missed)		(penalty scored) Roger; (penalty scored) Melero; (penalty scored) León; (penalty scored) Duarte

16 January 2021	Leganés (2)	0–1 (a.e.t.)	Sevilla (1)	Madrid (Note: Given the impossibility of being able to play the match at the Butarque stadium in Leganés due to the consequences of Storm Filomena.)
20:00		Report	Ocampos 96'	Stadium: Wanda Metropolitano; Referee: Pablo González Fuertes

16 January 2021	Rayo Vallecano (2)	2–0	Elche (1)	Las Rozas (Note: Given the impossibility of being able to play the match at the Vallecas stadium in Madrid due to the consequences of Storm Filomena.)
22:00	Bebé 36'; Catena 78'	Report		Stadium: La Ciudad del Fútbol; Referee: Isidro Díaz de Mera Escuderos

17 January 2021	Málaga (2)	1–2	Granada (1)	Málaga
12:00	Quintana 76'	Report	Fede 16'; Molina 28'	Stadium: La Rosaleda; Referee: Carlos del Cerro Grande

17 January 2021	Espanyol (2)	0–2	Osasuna (1)	Cornellà de Llobregat
12:00		Report	Martínez 9'; Barja 29'	Stadium: RCDE Stadium; Referee: Mario Melero López

17 January 2021	Sporting Gijón (2)	0–2	Real Betis (1)	Gijón
16:00		Report	Canales 28' (pen.); Rodri 31'	Stadium: El Molinón; Attendance: 300; Referee: Ricardo de Burgos Bengoetxea

17 January 2021	Navalcarnero (3)	3–1	Eibar (1)	Navalcarnero
16:00	Jaimez 30' (pen.); Esnáider 61', 79'	Report	Muto 16'	Stadium: Mariano González; Referee: Adrián Cordero Vega

17 January 2021	Tenerife (2)	0–1	Villarreal (1)	Santa Cruz de Tenerife
17:00		Report	Niño 90'	Stadium: Heliodoro Rodríguez López; Referee: César Soto Grado

17 January 2021	Alcorcón (2)	0–2	Valencia (1)	Las Rozas (Note: Given the impossibility of being able to play the match at the Santo Domingo stadium in Alcorcón due to the consequences of Storm Filomena.)
18:00		Report	Koindredi 12'; Vallejo 77'	Stadium: La Ciudad del Fútbol; Referee: Xavier Estrada Fernández

20 January 2021	Córdoba (3)	0–2	Real Sociedad (1)	Córdoba
19:00		Report	Willian José 57', 84'	Stadium: Nuevo Arcángel; Referee: Guillermo Cuadra Fernández

20 January 2021	Alcoyano (3)	2–1 (a.e.t.)	Real Madrid (1)	Alcoy
21:00	Solbes 80'; Juanan 115'	Report	Militão 45'	Stadium: El Collao; Referee: José María Sánchez Martínez

21 January 2021	Ibiza (3)	1–2	Athletic Bilbao (1)	Ibiza
19:00	Pérez 12'	Report	R. García 52'; Núñez 90+1'	Stadium: Can Misses; Referee: Pablo González Fuertes

21 January 2021	Cornellà (3)	0–2 (a.e.t.)	Barcelona (1)	Cornellà de Llobregat
21:00		Report	Dembélé 92'; Braithwaite 120+1'	Stadium: Nou Camp Municipal; Referee: César Soto Grado

== Round of 16 ==
=== Draw ===
Teams of La Liga were firstly drawn against the teams from Segunda and Segunda B, with those matches to be played at the Segunda/Segunda B teams' homes, and then the remaining six teams of La Liga were drawn against each other. The draw was held on 22 January 2021.

Pot 1; 2 teams of Segunda División B	Pot 2; 3 teams of Segunda División	Pot 3; 11 teams of La Liga
Alcoyano; Navalcarnero	Almería; Girona; Rayo Vallecano	Athletic Bilbao; Barcelona; Granada; Levante; Osasuna; Real Betis; Real Sociedad; Sevilla; Valencia; Valladolid; Villarreal

=== Matches ===
26 January 2021	Valladolid (1)	2–4	Levante (1)	Valladolid
19:00	Toni 13'; Weissman 65'	Report	Bardhi 23'; Malsa 45'; Coke 59'; Morales 80' (pen.)	Stadium: José Zorrilla; Referee: Valentín Pizarro Gómez

26 January 2021	Girona (2)	0–1	Villarreal (1)	Girona
21:00		Report	Pino 19'	Stadium: Montilivi; Referee: Ricardo de Burgos Bengoetxea

26 January 2021	Real Betis (1)	3–1 (a.e.t.)	Real Sociedad (1)	Seville
21:00	Canales 79'; Iglesias 96', 111'	Report	Oyarzabal 13'	Stadium: Benito Villamarín; Referee: Antonio Mateu Lahoz

27 January 2021	Sevilla (1)	3–0	Valencia (1)	Seville
19:00	De Jong 20', 33'; Rakitić 38'	Report		Stadium: Ramón Sánchez Pizjuán; Referee: Carlos del Cerro Grande

27 January 2021	Almería (2)	0–0 (a.e.t.) (5–4 p)	Osasuna (1)	Almería
21:00		Report		Stadium: Juegos Mediterráneos; Referee: Santiago Jaime Latre
	Penalties
	Akieme (penalty scored); Corpas (penalty missed); Sadiq (penalty scored); Ramazani (penalty scored); De la Hoz (penalty scored); Carvalho (penalty scored)		(penalty scored) Torres; (penalty scored) Moncayola; (penalty scored) Calleri; (penalty missed) Sánchez; (penalty scored) Barja; (penalty missed) D. García

27 January 2021	Rayo Vallecano (2)	1–2	Barcelona (1)	Madrid
21:00	García 63'	Report	Messi 70'; De Jong 80'	Stadium: Vallecas; Referee: Guillermo Cuadra Fernández

28 January 2021	Navalcarnero (3)	0–6	Granada (1)	Navalcarnero
19:00		Report	Germán 9'; Soro 24'; Vico 32'; Soldado 34'; Foulquier 72'; Molina 78'	Stadium: Mariano González; Referee: Javier Alberola Rojas

28 January 2021	Alcoyano (3)	1–2	Athletic Bilbao (1)	Alcoy
21:00	Carbonell 39'	Report	Villalibre 53'; Williams 78'	Stadium: El Collao; Referee: David Medié Jiménez

== Quarter-finals ==
=== Draw ===
All eight teams were in one pot, and the home team was decided by the luck of the draw. As the only remaining Segunda División side, Almería hosted its opponent regardless, as per the rules. The draw was held on 29 January 2021.

La Liga; 7 teams	Segunda División; 1 team
Athletic Bilbao; Barcelona; Granada; Levante; Real Betis; Sevilla; Villarreal	Almería

=== Matches ===
2 February 2021	Almería (2)	0–1	Sevilla (1)	Almería
21:00		Report	Ocampos 67'	Stadium: Juegos Mediterráneos; Referee: Xavier Estrada Fernández

3 February 2021	Levante (1)	1–0 (a.e.t.)	Villarreal (1)	Valencia
19:00	Roger 120+1'	Report		Stadium: Ciutat de València; Referee: César Soto Grado

3 February 2021	Granada (1)	3–5 (a.e.t.)	Barcelona (1)	Granada
21:00	Kenedy 33'; Soldado 47'; Vico 103' (pen.)	Report	Griezmann 88', 100'; Alba 90+2', 113'; De Jong 108'	Stadium: Nuevo Los Cármenes; Referee: José María Sánchez Martínez

4 February 2021	Real Betis (1)	1–1 (a.e.t.) (1–4 p)	Athletic Bilbao (1)	Seville
21:00	Juanmi 84'	Report	R. García 90+4'	Stadium: Benito Villamarín; Referee: Alejandro Hernández Hernández
	Penalties
	Mandi (penalty scored); Canales (penalty missed); Juanmi (penalty missed)		(penalty scored) R. García; (penalty scored) Williams; (penalty scored) Morcillo; (penalty scored) Berchiche

== Semi-finals ==
=== Draw ===
The draw for the semi-finals was held on 5 February 2021.

=== Summary ===
Team 1	Agg.	Team 2	1st leg	2nd leg
Sevilla (1)	2–3	Barcelona (1)	2–0	0–3 (a.e.t.)
Athletic Bilbao (1)	3–2	Levante (1)	1–1	2–1 (a.e.t.)

=== Matches ===
10 February 2021
21:00

Sevilla	2–0	Barcelona
Koundé 25'; Rakitić 85'	Report

Ramón Sánchez Pizjuán, Seville
Referee: Antonio Mateu Lahoz
3 March 2021
21:00

Barcelona	3–0 (a.e.t.)	Sevilla
Dembélé 12'; Piqué 90+4'; Braithwaite 95'	Report

Camp Nou, Barcelona
Referee: José María Sánchez Martínez

Barcelona won 3–2 on aggregate.

11 February 2021
21:00

Athletic Bilbao	1–1	Levante
Martínez 58'	Report	Melero 26'

San Mamés, Bilbao
Referee: Jesús Gil Manzano
4 March 2021
21:00

Levante	1–2 (a.e.t.)	Athletic Bilbao
Roger 17'	Report	R. García 30' (pen.); Berenguer 112'

Ciutat de València, Valencia
Referee: Carlos del Cerro Grande

Athletic Bilbao won 3–2 on aggregate.

== Final ==
17 April 2021
21:30 CEST

Athletic Bilbao	0–4	Barcelona
	Report	Griezmann 60'; De Jong 63'; Messi 68', 72'

La Cartuja, Seville
Attendance: 0 (Note: The match was played behind closed doors due to the COVID-19 pandemic in Spain.)
Referee: Juan Martínez Munuera (Valencian Community)

== Top scorers ==
Rank	Player	Club	Goals
1	(Spain) Sergio León	Levante	5
2	(Spain) Jorge Molina	Granada	4
2	(Spain) Kike Barja	Osasuna	4
4	(Netherlands) Luuk de Jong	Sevilla	3
4	(France) Antoine Griezmann	Barcelona	3
4	(Argentina) Lionel Messi	Barcelona	3
4	(Netherlands) Frenkie de Jong	Barcelona	3
4	(Spain) Raúl Garcia	Athletic Bilbao	3
4	(Spain) Fer Niño	Villarreal	3
4	(Spain) Yeremy Pino	Villarreal	3
4	(Spain) Juan Esnáider	Navalcarnero	3
4	(Spain) Óscar Plano	Valladolid	3
4	(Spain) Toni Villa	Valladolid	3
4	(Spain) Sergio Castel	Ibiza	3
4	(Spain) Pedro León	Eibar	3
4	(Spain) Rafa Mir	Huesca	3
4	(Spain) Fede Vico	Granada	3
