= 2019–20 CD Numancia season =

CD Numancia
2019–20 season
- President: Moisés Israel Garzón
- Head coach: Luis Carrión
- Stadium: Los Pajaritos
- Segunda División: 20th (relegated)
- Copa del Rey: First round
- Top goalscorer: League: Curro Sánchez (13 goals); All: Curro Sánchez (13 goals)
Home colours	Away colours	Third colours

The 2019–20 season was CD Numancia's 75th season in existence and the club's 11th consecutive season in the second division of Spanish football. In addition to the domestic league, Numancia participated in this season's edition of the Copa del Rey. The season was slated to cover a period from 1 July 2019 to 30 June 2020. It was extended extraordinarily beyond 30 June due to the COVID-19 pandemic in Spain.

== Players ==
=== First-team squad ===
As of 31 January 2020

Note: Flags indicate national team as defined under FIFA eligibility rules; some limited exceptions apply. Players may hold more than one non-FIFA nationality.

No.	Pos.	Nation	Player
1	GK	ESP	Juan Carlos
2	DF	ESP	Álex Sola (on loan from Real Sociedad)
3	DF	ESP	Adri Castellano
4	DF	ESP	Derik Osede
5	DF	GNB	Admonio Vicente
6	MF	ESP	Alberto Escassi
7	MF	ESP	Erik Morán
9	FW	ESP	Higinio Marín
10	FW	ESP	Alain Oyarzun
11	FW	ESP	Nacho Sánchez
12	MF	ESP	Antonio Otegui (on loan from Osasuna)
13	GK	ESP	Dani Barrio
14	MF	ESP	Alberto Noguera

No.	Pos.	Nation	Player
15	MF	ESP	Néstor Albiach
16	DF	ESP	Bernardo Cruz (on loan from Granada)
17	DF	ESP	Iván Calero
18	FW	SRB	Igor Zlatanović (on loan from Mallorca)
20	MF	POR	Gus Ledes
21	MF	ESP	Marc Mateu
22	MF	ESP	Curro Sánchez
23	DF	ESP	Héctor Hernández
24	MF	ESP	Álvaro Aguado (on loan from Real Valladolid)
26	FW	MAR	Moha
27	MF	ESP	Ander Vidorreta
30	GK	ESP	Roberto Jara

=== Reserve team ===
Note: Flags indicate national team as defined under FIFA eligibility rules; some limited exceptions apply. Players may hold more than one non-FIFA nationality.

No.	Pos.	Nation	Player
29	DF	ESP	Marcos Gil
33	FW	ESP	Adrián Herrera
34	DF	ESP	Óscar de Frutos

No.	Pos.	Nation	Player
35	MF	ALG	Ali Radjel
37	MF	ESP	Fredi Sualdea

=== Out on loan ===
Note: Flags indicate national team as defined under FIFA eligibility rules; some limited exceptions apply. Players may hold more than one non-FIFA nationality.

No.	Pos.	Nation	Player
—	GK	ESP	Taliby Konate (at Guijuelo until 30 June 2020)
—	DF	ESP	Marcos Isla (at Tudelano until 30 June 2020)
—	MF	ESP	Kako Sanz (at Castellón until 30 June 2020)

No.	Pos.	Nation	Player
—	MF	GHA	Yaw Yeboah (at Celta B until 30 June 2020)
—	FW	ESP	Jordi Sánchez (at Valencia Mestalla until 30 June 2020)

== Pre-season and friendlies ==
Win Draw Loss

1 August 2019 Friendly	Numancia	1–1	Athletic Bilbao	Soria, Spain
20:00 CEST (UTC+02:00)	Guillermo 7'	Report	Vivian 56'	Stadium: Los Pajaritos; Referee: Álvaro Moreno

== Competitions ==
=== Overview ===
Competition	First match	Last match	Starting round	Final position	Record							
Competition	First match	Last match	Starting round	Final position	Pld	W	D	L	GF	GA	GD	Win %
Segunda División	18 August 2019	20 July 2020	Matchday 1	20th	42	13	11	18	45	53	−8	30.95
Copa del Rey	17 December 2019		First round	First round	1	0	1	0	1	1	+0	0.00
Total					43	13	12	18	46	54	−8	30.23

Last updated: 20 July 2020
Source: Competitions

=== Segunda División ===
==== League table ====
Pos	Team	Pld	W	D	L	GF	GA	GD	Pts	Promotion, qualification or relegation
18	Ponferradina	42	12	15	15	45	50	−5	51 (Note: Ponferradina finished ahead of Deportivo La Coruña on head-to-head goal difference: Ponferradina 2–0 Deportivo La Coruña, Deportivo La Coruña 2–1 Ponferradina.)	
19	Deportivo La Coruña (R)	42	12	15	15	43	60	−17	51	Relegation to Segunda División B
20	Numancia (R)	42	13	11	18	45	53	−8	50	Relegation to Segunda División B
21	Extremadura (R)	42	10	13	19	43	59	−16	43	Relegation to Segunda División B
22	Racing Santander (R)	42	5	18	19	39	56	−17	33	Relegation to Segunda División B

Source: LaLiga Soccerway
Rules for classification: 1) points; 2) head-to-head points; 3) head-to-head goal difference; 4) goal difference; 5) number of goals scored
(R) Relegated

==== Results summary ====
Overall								Home						Away					
Pld	W	D	L	GF	GA	GD	Pts	W	D	L	GF	GA	GD	W	D	L	GF	GA	GD
42	13	11	18	45	53	−8	50	11	5	5	24	14	+10	2	6	13	21	39	−18

Last updated: 20 July 2020.
Source: La Liga SmartBank

==== Results by round ====
Round	1	2	3	4	5	6	7	8	9	10	11	12	13	14	15	16	17	18	19	20	21	22	23	24	25	26	27	28	29	30	31	32	33	34	35	36	37	38	39	40	41	42
Ground	A	H	A	H	A	H	A	H	A	H	H	A	H	A	H	A	H	A	H	A	H	A	H	A	H	A	A	H	A	H	H	A	H	A	H	A	H	A	H	A	H	A
Result	L	L	W	D	W	D	D	D	W	D	L	D	W	W	W	D	L	D	L	W	W	L	D	W	L	D	L	D	L	L	L	L	L	L	L	W	L	W	L	W	L	W
Position	17	22	12	12	7	9	11	12	6	9	13	13	9	8	5	5	8	8	10	8	6	8	7	6	7	7	8	8	9	12	14	16	16	19	19	18	19	18	21	18	20	20

Updated to match(es) played on 20 July 2020. Source: La Liga SmartBank
A = Away; H = Home; W = Win; D = Draw; L = Loss

==== Matches ====
The fixtures were revealed on 4 July 2019.

18 August 2019 1	Numancia	0–1	Alcorcón	Soria
18:00 CEST (UTC+2)	Alberto Escassi (yellow card) 62'; Luís Gustavo (yellow card) 70'	Report	Carlos Pomares (yellow card) 6'; Ernesto Gómez (yellow card) 16'; Sandaza (yellow card) 22'; Dani Romera 65'; Sosa (yellow card) 68'; Dorca (yellow card) 83'; Boateng (yellow card) 87'	Stadium: Los Pajaritos; Attendance: 3,128; Referee: (Spain) Alejandro Muñiz Ruiz

25 August 2019 2	Tenerife	3–2	Numancia	Santa Cruz de Tenerife
20:00 CEST (UTC+2)	Mazáň (yellow card) 41'; Borja Lasso 43' (yellow card) 62'; Suso Santana 51' (pen.); Aitor Sanz (yellow card) 74'; Malbašić 78'	Report	Higinio Marín 65'; Curro Sánchez 90+5'	Stadium: Estadio Heliodoro Rodríguez López; Attendance: 10,544; Referee: (Spain) Miguel Ortíz Arias

31 August 2019 3	Numancia	2–0	Mirandés	Soria
18:00 CEST (UTC+2)	Otegui (yellow card) 25'; Alberto Escassi (yellow card) 71'; Higinio Marín 75'; Carlos Gutiérrez 87'	Report		Stadium: Los Pajaritos; Attendance: 3,073; Referee: (Spain) Jorge Figueroa Vázquez

7 September 2019 4	Extremadura	0–0	Numancia	Almendralejo
20:00 CEST (UTC+2)	Pinchi (yellow card) 78'	Report	Carlos Gutiérrez (yellow card) 36' (yellow-red card) 89'; Iván Calero (yellow card) 66' (yellow-red card) 86'	Stadium: Estadio Francisco de la Hera; Attendance: 5,596; Referee: (Spain) Iñaki Vicandi Garrido

14 September 2019 5	Numancia	1–0	Huesca	Soria
16:00 CEST (UTC+2)	Nacho (yellow card) 58'; Álex Sola (yellow card) 62'; Alberto Escassi 80'	Report	David Ferreiro (yellow card) 45+2'; Luisinho (yellow card) 48'; Jorge Pulido (yellow card) 55'	Stadium: Los Pajaritos; Attendance: 4,032; Referee: (Spain) Daniel Trujillo Suárez

18 September 2019 6	Deportivo La Coruña	3–3	Numancia	A Coruña
21:00 CEST (UTC+2)	Shibasaki (yellow card) 34'; Víctor Mollejo 49'; Koné 83' (pen.) (yellow card) 51' (yellow-red card) 90+1'; Ager Aketxe 55'	Report	Alberto Escassi 13' 90+3'; Derik Osede 88'	Stadium: Estadio Riazor; Attendance: 14,011; Referee: (Spain) Santiago Varón Aceitón

22 September 2019 7	Numancia	1–1	Elche	Soria
18:00 CEST (UTC+2)	Adri Castellano 2'; Curro Sánchez (yellow card) 56'; Alberto Escassi (red card) 71'	Report	Ramón Folch 22'; Gonzalo Verdú (yellow card) 40'; Manuel Sánchez (yellow card) 66'	Stadium: Los Pajaritos; Attendance: 3,082; Referee: (Spain) Álvaro Moreno Aragón

28 September 2019 8	Racing Santander	0–0	Numancia	Santander
20:00 CEST (UTC+2)	Moi (yellow card) 10'; Jordi Figueras (yellow card) 33'	Report	Iván Calero (yellow card) 18'; Higinio Marín (yellow card) 23'	Stadium: El Sardinero; Attendance: 12,534; Referee: (Spain) Iosu Galech Apezteguía

1 October 2019 9	Numancia	1–0	Fuenlabrada	Soria
19:00 CEST (UTC+2)	Curro Sánchez 42' (red card) 57'; Higinio Marín (yellow card) 58'; Iván Calero (yellow card) 78'; Marc Mateu (yellow card) 80'; Carlos Gutiérrez (yellow card) 90+4'; Luís Gustavo (yellow card) 90+6'	Report	José León (yellow card) 14'; Chico (yellow card) 27'; Oriol Riera (yellow card) 63'; Iban Salvador (yellow card) 65'; Nteka (yellow card) 90+4'	Stadium: Los Pajaritos; Attendance: 2,866; Referee: (Spain) Aitor Gorostegui Fernández

6 October 2019 10	Real Oviedo	1–1	Numancia	Oviedo
16:00 CEST (UTC+2)	Bárcenas 17' (yellow card) 54'; Tejera (yellow card) 63'	Report	Alberto Noguera (yellow card) 65'; Alain Oyarzun (yellow card) 79'; Luís Gustavo (yellow card) 87'; Carlos Gutiérrez 90+1'	Stadium: Estadio Carlos Tartiere; Attendance: 12,263; Referee: (Spain) Daniel Trujillo Suárez

13 October 2019 11	Numancia	0–1	Real Zaragoza	Soria
16:00 CEST (UTC+2)		Report	Eguaras (yellow card) 48', (goal) 81'; Clemente (yellow card) 53'; Blanco (yellow card) 90+4'	Stadium: Los Pajaritos; Attendance: 5,734; Referee: (Spain) José Antonio López Toca

19 October 2019 12	Ponferradina	1–1	Numancia	Ponferrada
16:00 CEST (UTC+2)		Report		Stadium: Estadio El Toralín

26 October 2019 13	Numancia	3–1	Lugo	Soria
20:00 CEST (UTC+2)		Report		Stadium: Los Pajaritos

1 November 2019 14	Numancia	1–0	Albacete	Soria
12:00 CET (UTC+1)		Report		Stadium: Los Pajaritos

9 November 2019 15	Sporting Gijón	0–1	Numancia	Gijón
18:00 CET (UTC+1)		Report		Stadium: El Molinón

16 November 2019 16	Numancia	2–2	Rayo Vallecano	Soria
18:30 CET (UTC+1)		Report		Stadium: Los Pajaritos

24 November 2019 17	Almería	2–0	Numancia	Almería
12:00 CET (UTC+1)		Report		Stadium: Estadio de los Juegos Mediterráneos

29 November 2019 18	Numancia	0–0	Málaga	Soria
21:00 CET (UTC+1)		Report		Stadium: Los Pajaritos

8 December 2019 19	Las Palmas	3–1	Numancia	Las Palmas
18:00 CET (UTC+1)		Report		Stadium: Estadio Gran Canaria

13 December 2019 20	Numancia	2–0	Girona	Soria
21:00 CET (UTC+1)		Report		Stadium: Los Pajaritos

21 December 2019 21	Cádiz	2–4	Numancia	Cádiz
21:00 CET (UTC+1)	Perea 13'; Querol 77'	Report	Derik 41'; Curro 65' (pen.), 66'; Higinio 89'	Stadium: Estadio Ramón de Carranza; Attendance: 14,730; Referee: Rubén Ávalos Barrera

5 January 2020 22	Numancia	0–1	Deportivo La Coruña	Soria
12:00 CET (UTC+1)		Report		Stadium: Los Pajaritos

15 January 2020 23	Alcorcón	2–2	Numancia	Alcorcón
19:00 CET (UTC+1)		Report		Stadium: Santo Domingo

18 January 2020 24	Numancia	2–0	Sporting Gijón	Soria
16:00 CET (UTC+1)		Report		Stadium: Los Pajaritos

25 January 2020 25	Real Zaragoza	1–0	Numancia	Zaragoza
21:00 CET (UTC+1)	Guitián (yellow card) 24'; Vigaray (yellow card) 48'; Soro (yellow card) 58'; Puado 70', (yellow card) 84'	Report	Escassi (yellow card) 53'	Stadium: La Romareda; Attendance: 22,658; Referee: Daniel Jesús Trujillo Suárez

2 February 2020 26	Numancia	1–1	Almería	Soria
18:15 CET (UTC+1)		Report		Stadium: Los Pajaritos

9 February 2020 27	Málaga	2–1	Numancia	Málaga
20:30 CET (UTC+1)		Report		Stadium: La Rosaleda

15 February 2020 28	Numancia	1–1	Las Palmas	Soria
18:15 CET (UTC+1)		Report		Stadium: Los Pajaritos

22 February 2020 29	Albacete	2–1	Numancia	Albacete
20:30 CET (UTC+1)		Report		Stadium: Estadio Carlos Belmonte

1 March 2020 30	Elche	2–0	Numancia	Elche
16:00 CET (UTC+1)		Report		Stadium: Estadio Manuel Martínez Valero

7 March 2020 31	Numancia	1–2	Racing Santander	Soria
18:15 CET (UTC+1)	Noguera 90+2'	Report	Derik 62' (o.g.); Hernando 72'	Stadium: Los Pajaritos; Attendance: 3,786; Referee: Víctor Areces Franco

14 June 2020 32	Mirandés	2–1	Numancia	Miranda de Ebro
17:00 CEST (UTC+2)		Report		Stadium: Estadio Municipal de Anduva

18 June 2020 33	Numancia	1–2	Cádiz	Soria
19:30 CET (UTC+1)	Curro 37' (pen.)	Report	José Mari 14'; Cala 90'	Stadium: Los Pajaritos; Attendance: 0 Referee: José Antonio López Toca

21 June 2020 34	Fuenlabrada	2–0	Numancia	Fuenlabrada
21:45 CEST (UTC+2)		Report		Stadium: Fernando Torres

24 June 2020 35	Girona	2–0	Numancia	Girona
19:30 CEST (UTC+2)		Report		Stadium: Montilivi

28 June 2020 36	Numancia	1–0	Real Oviedo	Soria
19:30 CET (UTC+1)		Report		Stadium: Los Pajaritos

1 July 2020 37	Lugo	3–1	Numancia	Lugo
19:30 CEST (UTC+2)		Report		Stadium: Estadio Anxo Carro

4 July 2020 38	Numancia	1–0	Extremadura	Soria
17:00 CET (UTC+1)				Stadium: Los Pajaritos

9 July 2020 39	Rayo Vallecano	3–2	Numancia	Madrid
19:30 CEST (UTC+2)	Suárez 25' (pen.); Qasmi (yellow card) 28'; De Frutos 45+4'; Comesaña (yellow card) 57'; Villar 66' (pen.); Martín (yellow card) 78'	Report	Morán (yellow card) 54'; Escassi (yellow card) 54'; Higinio 57', (red card) 65'; Curro 72', (yellow card) 90+5'; Nacho (yellow card) 90+5'	Stadium: Vallecas; Attendance: 0 Referee: Iosu Galech Apezteguía

12 July 2020 40	Numancia	1–0	Ponferradina	Soria
19:30 CEST (UTC+2)	Noguera (yellow card) 16'; Sanhaji (yellow card) 43'; Calero (yellow card) 70'; Zlatanović 85'	Report	Manzanara (yellow card) 63'; Yuri (yellow card) 90+3'	Stadium: Los Pajaritos; Attendance: 0 Referee: Iñaki Vicandi Garrido

17 July 2020 41	Huesca	3–0	Numancia	Huesca
21:00 CEST (UTC+2)	Mir 54' (pen.), 68'; Sá (yellow card) 62'; Okazaki 78'	Report	Hernández (yellow card) 53'	Stadium: El Alcoraz; Attendance: 0 Referee: José Antonio López Toca

20 July 2020 42	Numancia	2–1	Tenerife	Soria
21:00 CEST (UTC+2)	Zlatanović 11'; Curro 64'	Report	Šipčić 60'	Stadium: Los Pajaritos; Attendance: 0 Referee: Rubén Ávalos Barrera

=== Copa del Rey ===
17 December 2019 First round	Ceuta	1–1 (a.e.t.) (3–2 p)	Numancia	Ceuta
21:00 CET (UTC+1)	Polaco 76'	Report	Néstor 47'	Stadium: Alfonso Murube; Attendance: 1,500; Referee: Luis Mario Milla Alvéndiz
	Penalties
	Ramírez (penalty scored); Sánchez (penalty scored); Ismael (penalty missed); Castro (penalty scored)		(penalty scored) Guillermo; (penalty scored) Mateu; (penalty missed) Sola; (penalty missed) Gus Ledes; (penalty missed) Néstor
