= Adrián Herrera =

Spanish footballer

Adri Herrera
Personal information
- Full name: Adrián Herrera González
- Date of birth: 3 January 1999 (age 27)
- Place of birth: Coria, Spain
- Position: Forward

Team information
- Current team: Palencia

Youth career
- Villamuriel
- 2011–2014: CIA
- 2014–2018: Valladolid

Senior career*
Years	Team	Apps	(Gls)
2018–2019	Valladolid B	0	(0)
2018–2019	→ Cristo Atlético (loan)	27	(14)
2019–2020	Numancia B	24	(13)
2020	Numancia	9	(0)
2020–2021	Tenerife	0	(0)
2020–2021	→ Zamora (loan)	10	(2)
2021–2022	Zamora	23	(3)
2022–2023	Cristo Atlético	17	(2)
2023–	Palencia	30	(2)
- * Club domestic league appearances and goals as of 14 September 2024

Adrián "Adri" Herrera González (born 3 January 1999) is a Spanish professional footballer who plays for Palencia as a forward.

== Club career ==
Born in Coria, Cáceres, Extremadura, Herrera joined Real Valladolid's youth setup in 2014, after representing Club Internacional de la Amistad and EF Villamuriel. On 23 August 2018, after finishing his formation, he was loaned to Tercera División side CD Cristo Atlético for the season.

Herrera made his senior debut on 26 August 2018, playing the last 14 minutes in a 3–0 home win against CD Bupolsa. He scored his first goals on 16 September, netting a hat-trick in a 5–0 home routing of CF Briviesca, and finished the campaign with 14 goals, being the club's top goalscorer.

On 7 July 2019, Herrera moved to CD Numancia, being initially assigned to the reserves also in the fourth division. He made his professional debut the following 15 February, coming on as a late substitute for Marc Mateu in a 1–1 Segunda División home draw against UD Las Palmas.

On 20 August 2020, Herrera signed a two-year contract with CD Tenerife, being immediately loaned to Zamora CF in Segunda División B, for one year.
