= Vidorreta =

Vidorreta is a surname. Notable people with the surname include:

- Ander Vidorreta (born 1997), Spanish footballer
- Sara Vidorreta (born 1999), Spanish actress
- Txus Vidorreta (born 1966), Spanish basketball coach
