= Fran González =

Fran González may refer to:

- Fran González (footballer, born 1969)
- Fran González (footballer, born 1989)
- Fran González (footballer, born 1998)
- Fran González (footballer, born 2005)
