= AUGC Deportiva Ceuta =

Football club in Spain

AUGC Deportiva
- Full name: Asociación Unificada de Guardias Civiles Deportiva Ceuta
- Nickname: Deportiva
- Dissolved: 2021
- Ground: Alfonso Murube, Ceuta, Spain
- Capacity: 6,500
- Chairman: Rachid Sbihi
- Manager: Juan José Conde
- League: Regional Preferente
- 2019–20: Regional Preferente, 1st of 10
Home colours

Asociación Unificada de Guardias Civiles Deportiva Ceuta was a Spanish football club based in the autonomous city of Ceuta. It was named as an honour to the Spanish Civil Guard.

== History ==
Initially focused on the development of young athletes, the club played one senior season in 2007–08 under the name of Asociación Independiente de la Guardia Civil Profesional Club de Fútbol (ASIGC CF). After finishing in the first position in the Regional Preferente de Ceuta, they lost the promotion play-off to Tercera División to Casino del Real CF.

The club returned to senior football in the 2019–20 campaign, under the name of Asociación Unificada de Guardias Civiles Deportiva Ceuta. In May 2020, after again winning the Preferente, they qualified to the 2020–21 Copa del Rey.

Deportiva was knocked out of the Cup in the preliminary rounds by Racing Murcia FC, and did not play again for the season as the club did not register a senior side for the season's Preferente.

== Season to season ==
Season	Tier	Division	Place	Copa del Rey
2007–08	5	Reg. Pref.	1st	
2008–2019	DNP			
2019–20	5	Reg. Pref.	1st	
2020–21	DNP			Preliminary
