= Pablo Sanz =

Pablo Sanz may refer to:

- Pablo Sanz (1932–2012), Spanish actor in films such as Carnival Day
- Pablo Sanz (footballer, born 1973), Spanish assistant football manager and former football midfielder
- Pablo Sanz (footballer, born 1995), Spanish football forward
