= Juan Esnáider (footballer, born 1992) =

Spanish footballer

Personal information
- Full name: Juan Esnáider Ruiz
- Date of birth: 31 January 1992 (age 34)
- Place of birth: Madrid, Spain
- Height: 1.80 m (5 ft 11 in)
- Position: Forward

Youth career
- Real Madrid
- Villarreal

Senior career*
Years	Team	Apps	(Gls)
2011–2012	Villarreal C	4	(0)
2012	Rayo Majadahonda	15	(4)
2012–2013	Las Rozas	28	(14)
2013–2014	Zaragoza B	28	(13)
2014	Zaragoza	5	(1)
2014–2015	Huesca	34	(3)
2015–2016	Toledo	39	(12)
2016–2017	Lausanne-Sport	1	(0)
2017	Mérida	10	(0)
2018	Tudelano	18	(1)
2018–2021	Navalcarnero	72	(13)
2021	KTP	12	(1)
Total		266	(62)
- * Club domestic league appearances and goals

Juan Esnáider Ruiz (born 31 January 1992) is a Spanish former professional footballer who played as a forward.

He played as high as Segunda División in his own country (with Real Zaragoza), totalling 148 games and 20 goals in the Segunda División B for Zaragoza B, Huesca, Toledo, Mérida, Tudelano and Navalcarnero. He also had brief spells in the top divisions of Switzerland and Finland.

== Club career ==
Born in Madrid, Esnáider graduated from Villarreal's youth system, and made his senior debut with the C team in 2011, in Tercera División. On 9 January 2012, he signed with Rayo Majadahonda of the same level.

Esnáider joined amateurs Las Rozas in the summer of 2012 and, in July of the following year, he moved to Real Zaragoza's reserves. He appeared in his first game as a professional on 9 March 2014, coming on as a late substitute for Luis García in a 1–1 home draw against Mallorca in the Segunda División. He scored his only goal in the competition seven days later, but in a 4–2 loss at Ponferradina.

On 1 September 2014, Esnáider terminated his contract with the Aragonese club and signed for neighbouring Huesca hours later. On 3 August 2015, after achieving promotion to the second tier, he moved to Toledo.

After a career-best 12 goals in his one season, in June 2016 Esnáider moved abroad for the first time to Lausanne-Sport of the Swiss Super League. He made his debut on 16 September in the last 32 of the national cup, scoring in a 3–1 away defeat to Köniz. His sole other appearance was his top-flight debut on 2 October late into a 4–1 home win over Lugano.

Esnáider subsequently returned to Spain's third tier from July 2017, with Mérida, Tudelano and Navalcarnero. On 17 January 2021, he scored twice in a 3–1 home victory against La Liga club Eibar in the round of 32 of the Copa del Rey.

In August 2021, Esnáider headed back to a foreign top flight, joining Kotkan Työväen Palloilijat of the Finnish Veikkausliiga for the remainder of the season with the option of one more. He scored once to conclude a 2–0 home win over Honka on 16 October.

== Personal life ==
Esnáider's father, also named Juan, was also a footballer and a forward. He too represented Zaragoza, and was a full international for Argentina. His younger brother Fernando died aged 17 in 2012, from a terminal illness. Another sibling, Facundo, was born in Porto and also became a footballer.

The family surname, originally spelled Schneider, came from Volga German ancestors.
