= Pablo Sanz (footballer, born 1995) =

Spanish footballer

Personal information
- Full name: Pablo Sanz Martínez
- Date of birth: 9 April 1995 (age 31)
- Place of birth: Soria, Spain
- Height: 1.84 m (6 ft 0 in)
- Position: Forward

Team information
- Current team: Almazán
- Number: 21

Youth career
- 2010–2013: Numancia
- 2013–2014: Rayo Majadahonda

Senior career*
Years	Team	Apps	(Gls)
2014–2017	Numancia B	49	(12)
2017	Numancia	1	(0)
2017–	Almazán	124	(25)
- * Club domestic league appearances and goals as of 15 April 2022

Pablo Sanz Martínez (born 9 April 1995) is a Spanish footballer who plays for SD Almazán as a forward.

== Club career ==
Born in Soria, Castile and León, Sanz was a CD Numancia youth graduate. Promoted to the B-team in 2011, he made his senior debut during the campaign, in the Tercera División.

Sanz scored his first senior goal on 1 November 2015, netting the last in a 3–1 away win against CD Mirandés B. He made his first-team debut on 15 April 2017, replacing Pablo Valcarce in a 3–1 away win against Elche CF in the Segunda División.
