= CD Cantolagua =

Association football club in Spain

Cantolagua
- Full name: Club Deportivo Cantolagua
- Founded: 1927
- Ground: Municipal Cantolagua, Sangüesa, Navarre, Spain
- Capacity: 1,000
- Chairman: Alberto Ozcoidi
- Manager: Javier Pascual
- League: Tercera Federación – Group 15
- 2025–26: Primera Autonómica, 3rd of 18 (promoted via play-offs)
| Home colours | Away colours |

Club Deportivo Cantolagua is a Spanish football team based in Sangüesa in the autonomous community of Navarre. Founded in 1927, it plays in Tercera Federación – Group 15, holding home matches in the Estadio Municipal Cantolagua, with a capacity of 1,000 people.

== History ==
Founded in 1927 as Sangüesa Football Club, the club changed name to Sangüesa Club de Fútbol in 1941, and subsequently to Club Deportivo Sangüesa in 1961. They first reached the Tercera División in 1977, winning their group in the 1978–79 season but missing out promotion.

After suffering relegation in 1983, the club only returned to the fourth division in 2015, twenty one years after changing name to Club Deportivo Cantolagua. They played in the Copa del Rey for the first time in 2020–21, being knocked out by La Liga side Real Valladolid.

== Season to season ==
| Season | Tier | Division | Place | Copa del Rey |
|---|---|---|---|---|
| 1941–42 | 4 | 2ª Reg. | 4th | |
| 1942–43 | 3 | 1ª Reg. | 3rd | |
| 1943–44 | 4 | 1ª Reg. | 3rd | |
| 1944–45 | 4 | 1ª Reg. | 6th | |
| 1945–46 | 4 | 1ª Reg. | 6th | |
| 1946–47 | 4 | 1ª Reg. | 9th | |
| 1947–48 | 4 | 1ª Reg. | 9th | |
| 1948–49 | 4 | 1ª Reg. | 9th | |
| 1949–50 | 4 | 1ª Reg. | 4th | |
| 1950–51 | 4 | 1ª Reg. | 11th | |
| 1951–52 | 5 | 2ª Reg. | 1st | |
| 1952–53 | 5 | 2ª Reg. | 6th | |
| 1953–54 | DNP | | | |
| 1954–55 | 5 | 2ª Reg. | 3rd | |
| 1955–56 | 4 | 1ª Reg. | 8th | |
| 1956–57 | 5 | 2ª Reg. | 3rd | |
| 1957–1962 | DNP | | | |
| 1963–64 | 5 | 2ª Reg. | 3rd | |
| 1964–65 | 4 | 1ª Reg. | (R) | |
| 1965–66 | DNP | | | |

| Season | Tier | Division | Place | Copa del Rey |
|---|---|---|---|---|
| 1966–67 | DNP | | | |
| 1967–68 | 5 | 2ª Reg. | 3rd | |
| 1968–69 | 5 | 2ª Reg. | 2nd | |
| 1969–70 | 5 | 2ª Reg. | 2nd | |
| 1970–71 | 4 | 1ª Reg. | 9th | |
| 1971–72 | 4 | 1ª Reg. | 4th | |
| 1972–73 | 4 | 1ª Reg. | 12th | |
| 1973–74 | 4 | 1ª Reg. | 2nd | |
| 1974–75 | 4 | Reg. Pref. | 3rd | |
| 1975–76 | 4 | Reg. Pref. | 4th | |
| 1976–77 | 4 | Reg. Pref. | 2nd | |
| 1977–78 | 4 | 3ª | 5th | |
| 1978–79 | 4 | 3ª | 1st | |
| 1979–80 | 4 | 3ª | 9th | |
| 1980–81 | 4 | 3ª | 6th | First round |
| 1981–82 | 4 | 3ª | 9th | Second round |
| 1982–83 | 4 | 3ª | 16th | |
| 1983–84 | 5 | Reg. Pref. | 15th | |
| 1984–85 | 5 | Reg. Pref. | 14th | |
| 1985–86 | 5 | Reg. Pref. | 12th | |

| Season | Tier | Division | Place | Copa del Rey |
|---|---|---|---|---|
| 1986–87 | 5 | Reg. Pref. | 8th | |
| 1987–88 | 5 | Reg. Pref. | 14th | |
| 1988–89 | 5 | Reg. Pref. | 17th | |
| 1989–90 | 6 | 1ª Reg. | 11th | |
| 1990–91 | 6 | 1ª Reg. | 15th | |
| 1991–92 | 6 | 1ª Reg. | 5th | |
| 1992–93 | 6 | 1ª Reg. | 3rd | |
| 1993–94 | 5 | Reg. Pref. | 18th | |
| 1994–95 | 5 | Reg. Pref. | 4th | |
| 1995–96 | 5 | Reg. Pref. | 18th | |
| 1996–97 | 6 | 1ª Reg. | 6th | |
| 1997–98 | 6 | 1ª Reg. | 9th | |
| 1998–99 | 6 | 1ª Reg. | 6th | |
| 1999–2000 | 6 | 1ª Reg. | 4th | |
| 2000–01 | 6 | 1ª Reg. | 5th | |
| 2001–02 | 6 | 1ª Reg. | 2nd | |
| 2002–03 | 6 | 1ª Reg. | 1st | |
| 2003–04 | 6 | 1ª Reg. | 1st | |
| 2004–05 | 5 | Reg. Pref. | 9th | |
| 2005–06 | 5 | Reg. Pref. | 10th | |

| Season | Tier | Division | Place | Copa del Rey |
|---|---|---|---|---|
| 2006–07 | 5 | Reg. Pref. | 8th | |
| 2007–08 | 5 | Reg. Pref. | 6th | |
| 2008–09 | 5 | Reg. Pref. | 2nd | |
| 2009–10 | 5 | Reg. Pref. | 11th | |
| 2010–11 | 5 | Reg. Pref. | 4th | |
| 2011–12 | 5 | Reg. Pref. | 9th | |
| 2012–13 | 5 | Reg. Pref. | 9th | |
| 2013–14 | 5 | Reg. Pref. | 9th | |
| 2014–15 | 5 | Reg. Pref. | 2nd | |
| 2015–16 | 4 | 3ª | 13th | |
| 2016–17 | 4 | 3ª | 12th | |
| 2017–18 | 4 | 3ª | 14th | |
| 2018–19 | 4 | 3ª | 19th | |
| 2019–20 | 5 | 1ª Aut. | 1st | |
| 2020–21 | 4 | 3ª | 4th / 3rd | First round |
| 2021–22 | 5 | 3ª RFEF | 5th | |
| 2022–23 | 5 | 3ª Fed. | 7th | |
| 2023–24 | 5 | 3ª Fed. | 6th | |
| 2024–25 | 5 | 3ª Fed. | 18th | |
| 2025–26 | 6 | 1ª Aut. | 3rd | |

| Season | Tier | Division | Place | Copa del Rey |
|---|---|---|---|---|
| 2026–27 | 5 | 3ª Fed. | | |

- 11 seasons in Tercera División
- 5 season in Tercera Federación/Tercera División RFEF
