= Raúl Vallejo =

Spanish footballer

Personal information
- Full name: Raúl Vallejo Suárez
- Date of birth: 25 August 1996 (age 30)
- Place of birth: León, Spain
- Height: 1.76 m (5 ft 9 in)
- Position: Midfielder

Youth career
- Peña

Senior career*
Years	Team	Apps	(Gls)
2015–2016	Virgen del Camino	34	(8)
2016–2017	Atlético Astorga	38	(4)
2017–2019	Numancia B	74	(18)
2017	Numancia	0	(0)
2019–2022	Zamora	43	(5)
2022–2023	Atlético Bembibre	9	(1)
2023-2025	Palencia	16	(1)
- * Club domestic league appearances and goals as of 25 July 2025

Raúl Vallejo Suárez (born 25 August 1996) is a Spanish footballer who is a Free Agent. He plays as a central midfielder.

== Club career ==
Born in León, Vallejo finished his formation with CD Fútbol Peña, as a forward. In 2015 he signed for Tercera División side CD La Virgen del Camino, moving to the central midfielder role during the pre-season; he made his senior debut on 23 August of that year, starting in a 0–1 away loss against Villaralbo CF.

Vallejo scored his first senior goal on 31 October 2015, netting the first in a 4–1 home routing of Ciudad Rodrigo CF. The following 9 July, after being an undisputed starter, he moved to fellow fourth division club Atlético Astorga FC.

On 15 August 2017 Vallejo joined CD Numancia, being assigned to the reserves still in the fourth tier. He made his first team debut on 6 September, coming on as a late substitute for goalscorer Marc Mateu in a 1–0 away win against Real Oviedo, for the season's Copa del Rey.

On 4 July 2019, Vallejo signed for Zamora CF, still in the fourth tier.
