= Moha (footballer, born 1999) =

Moroccan footballer

Personal information
- Full name: Mohamed Sanhaji Brahmi
- Date of birth: 15 April 1999 (age 27)
- Place of birth: Guercif, Morocco
- Height: 1.78 m (5 ft 10 in)
- Position: Winger

Team information
- Current team: Jaén
- Number: 21

Youth career
- Calasanz
- Numancia

Senior career*
Years	Team	Apps	(Gls)
2016–2019	Numancia B	65	(8)
2019–2021	Numancia	51	(4)
2021–2022	Betis B	30	(2)
2022	Numancia	16	(0)
2023	Teruel	13	(0)
2024	Ourense CF	7	(0)
2024–2025	Teruel	29	(2)
2025–	Jaén	31	(0)

International career
2018	Morocco U20	4	(0)
- * Club domestic league appearances and goals as of 7 May 2026

Mohamed Sanhaji Brahmi (born 15 April 1999), commonly known as Moha, is a Moroccan footballer who plays for Segunda Federación club Jaén as a left winger. He also holds Spanish nationality.

== Club career ==
Born in Guercif, Moha moved to Soria, Castile and León, aged only one, and was a CD Numancia youth graduate. He made his senior debut with the reserves on 9 April 2016, aged only 16, by coming on as a substitute for Edipo Rodríguez in a 0–1 Tercera División home loss against Ciudad Rodrigo CF.

Moha scored his first senior goal on 3 September 2016, netting the opener in a 3–1 away win against CD Cebrereña. He continued to appear regularly for the B-side in the following years, and signed a new contract with the club on 10 August 2019, being definitely promoted to the main squad by new manager Luis Carrión.

Moha made his first team debut on 18 August 2019, replacing fellow youth graduate Nacho in a 0–1 home loss against AD Alcorcón in the Segunda División. He scored his first professional goal on 16 November, netting the equalizer in a 2–2 home draw against Rayo Vallecano.

On 16 December 2019, Moha renewed his contract with Numancia until 2024.

== Career statistics ==
=== Club ===
As of match played 21 March 2021

Appearances and goals by club, season and competition
Club	Season	League			National Cup		Other		Total	
Club	Season	Division	Apps	Goals	Apps	Goals	Apps	Goals	Apps	Goals
Numancia	2019–20	Segunda División	34	1	1	0	—		35	1
Numancia	2020–21	Segunda División B	11	2	2	1	—		13	3
Numancia	Total		44	3	3	1	0	0	47	4
Career total			44	3	3	1	0	0	47	4
