= Binke Diabaté =

Malian footballer

Personal information
- Date of birth: 20 December 1995 (age 30)
- Place of birth: Bamako, Mali
- Height: 1.82 m (6 ft 0 in)
- Position: Forward

Team information
- Current team: Txantrea

Youth career
- 2004–2007: Cirbonero
- 2007–2012: Athletic Bilbao
- 2012–2014: Txantrea

Senior career*
Years	Team	Apps	(Gls)
2013–2015	Txantrea	25	(7)
2015–2016	Cirbonero	23	(7)
2016–2017	Numancia B	31	(9)
2017	Numancia	1	(0)
2017–2018	Calahorra	30	(16)
2018–2020	Logroñés	34	(17)
2020–2021	Arnedo	20	(9)
2021–2023	Cirbonero	55	(27)
2023–2024	SS Reyes	27	(4)
2024–2025	Coruxo	14	(2)
2025	Barbastro	16	(2)
2025–	Txantrea	1	(0)
- * Club domestic league appearances and goals as of 13 September 2025

Binke Diabaté (born 20 December 1995) is a Malian footballer who plays for Spanish Tercera Federación club Txantrea as a forward.

== Club career ==
Born in Mali, Diabaté moved to Spain at early age and joined CA Cirbonero's youth setup. In July 2007 he moved to Athletic Bilbao before leaving in 2012, and signing for UDC Txantrea.

Diabaté made his senior debut on 5 May 2013, scoring four goals in a 4–0 Tercera División away win against CD Lagun Artea, but was only promoted to the main squad ahead of the 2014–15 campaign. On 22 June 2015 he returned to Cirbonero, now assigned to the first team also in the fourth level.

In 2016 Diabaté joined CD Numancia, being initially assigned to the reserves still in the fourth division. On 9 April of the following year he made his first team debut, coming on as a second-half substitute for Marc Mateu in a 0–2 home loss against Girona FC in the Segunda División championship.
