= Nacho (footballer, born 1993) =

Spanish footballer

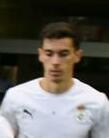

Personal information
- Full name: Ignacio Agustín Sánchez Romo
- Date of birth: 11 February 1993 (age 33)
- Place of birth: Las Palmas, Spain
- Height: 1.77 m (5 ft 10 in)
- Position: Winger

Team information
- Current team: Cartagena
- Number: 23

Youth career
- Logroñés
- 2011–2012: Numancia

Senior career*
Years	Team	Apps	(Gls)
2012–2015	Almazán	96	(25)
2015–2016	Numancia B	1	(0)
2015–2020	Numancia	130	(7)
2020–2021	Marbella	18	(0)
2021–2023	Real Unión	64	(18)
2023–2025	Racing Ferrol	52	(1)
2025–	Cartagena	5	(0)
- * Club domestic league appearances and goals as of 30 November 2025

Ignacio Agustín Sánchez Romo (born 11 February 1993), commonly known as Nacho, is a Spanish footballer who plays as a left winger for Primera Federación club Cartagena.

== Club career ==
Born in Las Palmas, Canary Islands, Nacho graduated from CD Numancia's youth setup in 2012 after a stint at UD Logroñés. He was subsequently released, and joined SD Almazán in Tercera División.

After scoring a career-best 17 goals in 2014–15 (which included a hat-trick in a 3–0 home win against CD Mirandés B on 9 November 2014), Nacho moved back to Numancia and was assigned to the reserves also in the fourth level. On 23 August 2015, after spending the entire pre-season with the first team, he made his professional debut, coming on as a second-half substitute for Natalio in a 6–3 Segunda División home win against CD Tenerife.

On 3 November 2015, Nacho signed a new two-year deal with the Nuevo Estadio Los Pajaritos-based club. He scored his first goal as a professional on 22 May of the following year, netting the first in a 2–3 away loss to CA Osasuna.

On 8 June 2016, Nacho agreed to a further contract extension until 2019, and he was definitely promoted to the main squad in the following campaign. On 24 October 2017, he was one of two players on target for his team as they defeated La Liga side Málaga CF 2–1 in the first leg of the fourth round of the Copa del Rey, in spite of trailing 0–1 in stoppage time.

On 23 September 2020, after being relegated, Nacho signed for Marbella FC in Segunda División B. The following 22 June, he moved to Primera División RFEF side Real Unión.

On 3 July 2023, after scoring 13 goals for Real Unión, Nacho agreed to a contract with Racing de Ferrol, newly-promoted to the second level.
