= Juanjo (footballer, born 1987) =

Spanish footballer

Personal information
- Full name: Juan José García Martínez
- Date of birth: 16 May 1987 (age 39)
- Place of birth: Murcia, Spain
- Height: 1.82 m (6 ft 0 in)
- Position: Right back

Team information
- Current team: Racing Murcia
- Number: 22

Youth career
- 2004–2006: Murcia

Senior career*
| Years | Team | Apps | (Gls) |
| 2006–2011 | Murcia B | 112 | (8) |
| 2010–2011 | → Jaén (loan) | 29 | (0) |
| 2011–2012 | Lorca Atlético | 30 | (1) |
| 2012–2013 | La Roda | 33 | (1) |
| 2013–2014 | Gimnàstic | 31 | (0) |
| 2014–2015 | Melilla | 35 | (1) |
| 2015–2017 | Cádiz | 31 | (0) |
| 2017 | Murcia | 14 | (0) |
| 2017–2018 | Lorca Deportiva | 26 | (0) |
| 2018–2019 | Badajoz | 22 | (0) |
| 2019–2020 | Guijuelo | 13 | (0) |
| 2020 | Inter de Madrid | 6 | (0) |
| 2020– | Racing Murcia | 0 | (0) |
- * Club domestic league appearances and goals as of 8 March 2020

Juan José García Martínez (born 16 May 1987), commonly known as Juanjo, is a Spanish footballer who plays for Racing Murcia FC. Mainly a right back, he can also play as a winger.

== Club career ==
Born in Murcia, Sánchez was a Real Murcia youth graduate and made his debut as a senior with the reserves in 2006 in the Tercera División. In August 2010, he was loaned to Segunda División B side Real Jaén for one season.

Juanjo continued to compete in the third level in the following years, representing Lorca Atlético CF, La Roda CF, Gimnàstic de Tarragona, UD Melilla, and Cádiz CF. He was promoted to Segunda División with the latter team in 2016, appearing in 29 matches (play-offs included).

Garrido made his professional debut on 19 August 2016, coming on as a second-half substitute for Luis Ruiz in a 1-1 away draw against UD Almería. He left the Estadio Ramón de Carranza the following 19 January by mutual consent, and returned to his first club, Murcia, just hours later.
