= José Albert =

Spanish footballer

Personal information
- Full name: José Albert Andrés
- Date of birth: 1 December 2003 (age 22)
- Place of birth: Onda, Spain
- Position: Left-back

Team information
- Current team: Zamora (on loan from Castellón)

Youth career
- 2010–2017: Onda
- 2017–2020: Villarreal
- 2020–2022: Castellón

Senior career*
Years	Team	Apps	(Gls)
2021–2025	Castellón B	49	(3)
2022–	Castellón	2	(0)
2025–2026	→ Ibiza (loan)	32	(4)
2026–	→ Zamora (loan)	0	(0)
- * Club domestic league appearances and goals as of 9 June 2026

José Albert Andrés (born 1 December 2003), known as José Albert, is a Spanish professional footballer who plays as a left-back for Zamora CF, on loan from CD Castellón.

== Career ==
Born in Onda, Castellón, Valencian Community, José Albert began his career with hometown club CD Onda, and later represented Villarreal CF before joining CD Castellón's youth sides in 2020. He made his senior debut with the reserves on 13 March 2021, playing the last six minutes of a 2–1 Regional Preferente away win over CF Nules.

On 24 May 2022, while still a youth, José Albert renewed his contract until 2024. He made his first team debut six days later, coming on as a late substitute for fellow youth graduate Aarón Romero in a 3–1 Primera División RFEF home loss to UE Cornellà.

On 12 June 2024, José Albert further extended his links with the Orelluts until 2026. The following 7 January, after only appearing with the main squad in Copa del Rey matches, he was loaned to third division side UD Ibiza until June.

On 2 July 2025, José Albert's loan with Ibiza was extended for a further season. On 23 June of the following year, he renewed his contract with Castellón until 2027, but was loaned to Zamora CF on 30 August.
