= Víctor Andrés =

Spanish footballer

Personal information
- Full name: Víctor Andrés Andrés
- Date of birth: 21 October 1988 (age 38)
- Place of birth: Soria, Spain
- Height: 1.75 m (5 ft 9 in)
- Position: Midfielder

Team information
- Current team: CD Toledo
- Number: 8

Youth career
- Numancia
- Valladolid

Senior career*
Years	Team	Apps	(Gls)
2007–2009	Valladolid B	25	(0)
2007–2008	→ Íscar (loan)	32	(1)
2009–2011	Numancia B	36	(5)
2010–2014	Numancia	52	(0)
2012–2013	→ Salamanca (loan)	32	(0)
2014	Cultural Leonesa	4	(0)
2015–2016	Atlético Astorga	33	(0)
2016–2017	Jaén	32	(1)
2017–2019	Talavera	67	(2)
2019–2020	Ebro	24	(1)
2020–	Calahorra	16	(0)
- * Club domestic league appearances and goals as of 21 March 2021

Víctor Andrés Andrés (born 21 October 1988 in Soria, Castile and León) is a Spanish footballer who plays for CD Calahorra as a midfielder.
