= Nico González (footballer, born 1988) =

Spanish footballer

Personal information
- Full name: Francisco José Nicolás González
- Date of birth: 6 November 1988 (age 38)
- Place of birth: Molina de Segura, Spain
- Height: 1.63 m (5 ft 4 in)
- Position: Winger

Youth career
- Villarreal

Senior career*
Years	Team	Apps	(Gls)
2007–2008	Cádiz B	29	(2)
2008–2009	Albacete B	30	(4)
2008	Albacete	1	(0)
2009–2010	Murcia B	21	(1)
2010–2011	Guadalajara	37	(4)
2011–2013	Tenerife	31	(2)
2012	→ Guadalajara (loan)	14	(1)
2013	Salamanca	0	(0)
2013–2014	Ontinyent	14	(1)
2014–2015	La Hoya Lorca	24	(0)
2015–2016	Arandina	35	(4)
2016–2020	Orihuela	129	(14)
2020–2021	Racing Murcia	28	(3)
2021–2022	La Unión Atlético	34	(0)
2022–2024	Unión Molinense	48	(1)
- * Club domestic league appearances and goals as of 21 April 2024

Francisco José Nicolás "Nico" González (born 6 November 1988), commonly known as just Nico, is a Spanish footballer who plays as a winger.

== Club career ==
Born in Molina de Segura, Murcia, Nico graduated from Villarreal CF's youth system, but made his senior debuts with Cádiz CF B in the 2007–08 season, in the Tercera División. One year later he joined Albacete Balompié, initially being assigned to the reserves in the same division; he played his first game as a professional on 26 October 2008, coming on as a late substitute in a 1–1 home draw against Celta de Vigo in the Segunda División.

In 2009, Nico first arrived in the Segunda División B, signing with Real Murcia Imperial. He continued competing in that level in the following years, with CD Guadalajara and CD Tenerife, contributing with four goals in 1,841 minutes of action to help the former club promote in 2011.

After Tenerife manager Antonio Calderón was sacked in January 2012, Nico was loaned to former side Guadalajara. On 3 March he scored his first professional goal, the last in a 2–0 win at FC Cartagena.

In June, Nico returned to Tenerife and division three and, despite being shown the door, he still managed to appear in 15 matches and net once during the season for the Canary Islands team, albeit in only one start. On 29 July 2013, his contract with the Blanquiazules was mutually terminated and he signed with Salamanca AC on 9 August. However, due to the club's juridical issues, he moved to Ontinyent CF instead.

On 8 July 2014, after suffering relegation with the Valencians, Nico moved to La Hoya Lorca CF also in the third division. Roughly a year later, he joined fellow league team Arandina CF.

On 13 July 2020, Nico joined Racing Murcia FC.
