= Manolo (footballer, born 1985) =

Spanish footballer

Personal information
- Full name: Manuel López Escámez
- Date of birth: 25 November 1985 (age 40)
- Place of birth: Bullas, Spain
- Height: 1.82 m (6 ft 0 in)
- Position: Midfielder

Team information
- Current team: Caravaca

Youth career
- Ciudad Murcia

Senior career*
Years	Team	Apps	(Gls)
2004–2006	Ciudad Murcia B		
2006–2007	Ciudad Murcia	11	(1)
2007–2009	Rayo Vallecano	22	(1)
2009–2010	Toledo	22	(1)
2011–2012	Roquetas	54	(5)
2012–2013	Bullense	21	(7)
2013–2016	UCAM Murcia	76	(7)
2016–2019	Jumilla	94	(2)
2019–2020	Murcia	22	(0)
2020–2021	Racing Murcia	27	(1)
2021–2022	Bullense	28	(2)
2022–2023	Caravaca	29	(0)
2023	Bullense	6	(0)
2024–	Caravaca	36	(0)
- * Club domestic league appearances and goals as of 13 October 2024

Manuel López Escámez (born 25 November 1985), commonly known as Manolo, is a Spanish footballer who plays for Caravaca as a central midfielder.

== Club career ==
Born in Bullas, Region of Murcia, Manolo graduated from Ciudad de Murcia's youth setup, and made his senior debuts with the reserves, playing several seasons in the regional leagues. In the 2006 summer he was promoted to the main squad, in Segunda División.

On 2 September 2006 Manolo played his first professional match, coming on as a late substitute in a 0–2 away loss against Xerez CD. He scored his first goal on 5 May of the following year, netting his side's only in a 1–1 draw at Hércules CF.

On 2 August 2007 Manolo moved to Rayo Vallecano in Segunda División B. After appearing rarely in his first campaign, which ended in promotion, he still managed to appear in 14 matches during his second (only two starts, however).

On 1 September 2009 Manolo left the Madrid outfit and joined CD Toledo, in the third level. He subsequently resumed his career in the lower leagues, representing CD Roquetas, CD Bullense, UCAM Murcia CF, FC Jumilla, Real Murcia and Racing Murcia FC.
