= Diego de Miguel =

Spanish footballer

Personal information
- Full name: Diego de Miguel Escribano
- Date of birth: 1 September 1984 (age 42)
- Place of birth: Soria, Spain
- Height: 1.86 m (6 ft 1 in)
- Position: Goalkeeper

Youth career
- Numancia Granada

Senior career*
Years	Team	Apps	(Gls)
2003–2004	Almazán		
2004–2010	Numancia B		
2005–2011	Numancia	5	(0)
2005–2006	→ Sabadell (loan)	11	(0)
2009–2010	→ Izarra (loan)	23	(0)
2011	Palencia	9	(0)
2012–2013	Izarra	21	(0)
2013–2015	Almazán	35	(0)
- * Club domestic league appearances and goals as of 00:00, 12 October 2015 (UTC)

Diego de Miguel Escribano (born 1 September 1984) is a Spanish former footballer who played as a goalkeeper.

== Club career ==
Born in Soria, Castile and León, de Miguel's career was spent almost exclusively in the lower leagues of Spanish football. Late into the 2004–05 season, as CD Numancia were already relegated, he appeared in two La Liga home matches, against CA Osasuna (2–2) and Deportivo de La Coruña (1–1).

During his spell with the club, de Miguel was mostly registered with the reserve team.
