= Nandi (footballer) =

Spanish footballer

Personal information
- Full name: Álvaro Hernández de Miguel
- Date of birth: 9 August 1990 (age 36)
- Place of birth: Soria, Spain
- Height: 1.87 m (6 ft 2 in)
- Position: Centre back

Team information
- Current team: Internacional de Madrid
- Number: 4

Youth career
- Numancia

Senior career*
Years	Team	Apps	(Gls)
2008–2011	Numancia B	101	(3)
2008–2011	Numancia	5	(1)
2011–2012	Murcia B	34	(0)
2012–2017	Tudelano	122	(5)
2017–2018	SS Reyes	23	(1)
2018–2020	Talavera	49	(1)
2020–	Internacional de Madrid	2	(0)
- * Club domestic league appearances and goals as of 31 January 2021

Álvaro Hernández de Miguel (born 9 August 1990), commonly known as Nandi, is a Spanish footballer who plays for Internacional de Madrid as a central defender.

== Football career ==
Born in Soria, Castile and León, Nandi finished his graduation with CD Numancia's youth setup, and made his senior debuts with the reserves in the 2007–08 season in the Tercera División. On 14 June 2008, while still a junior, he made his first-team debut, starting in a 2–2 home draw against Polideportivo Ejido, in the Segunda División.

On 12 November Nandi appeared with the main squad in a 0–2 away loss against Sporting de Gijón, playing the last eight minutes in the season's Copa del Rey. On 19 June 2010 he scored his first professional goal, but in a 2–4 away loss against Cádiz CF.

In July 2011 Nandi signed with another reserve team, Real Murcia Imperial, also in the fourth level. A season later he joined Segunda División B side CD Tudelano.
