= Irving Gudiño =

Panamanian footballer (born 2000)

Personal information
- Full name: Irving Jahir Gudiño López
- Date of birth: 15 November 2000 (age 25)
- Place of birth: Panama City, Panama
- Positions: Midfielder; winger

Team information
- Current team: Caracas F.C.
- Number: 8

Senior career*
Years	Team	Apps	(Gls)
2020–2025	Tauro	134	(4)
2020–2021	→ Marbella (loan)	19	(0)
2025–	Caracas	26	(0)

International career^{‡}
2020–	Panama	7	(0)
- * Club domestic league appearances and goals as of 27 May 2026 (UTC) ‡ National team caps and goals as of 30 December 2025

Irving Jahir Gudiño López (born 15 November 2000) is a Panamanian professional footballer who plays as a winger for Venezuelan club Caracas, and the Panama national team.

== Club career ==
Gúdiño came through the academy at Tauro. Promoted to Tauro FC 's top team in 2019. He made his professional debut on 19 August 2019, against CD Plaza Amador. He scored his first professional goal on 26 January 2020 against CD Arabe Unido.

In 2020, Gudiño signed for Marbella in the Spanish third division despite interest from Spanish La Liga side Granada CF. On 5 January 2021, he scored his first goal for Marbella against Real Valladolid in the Copa del Rey.

In July 2025, he signed for Venezuelan club Caracas.

== International career ==
He made his debut for the Panama national football team in February 2020 in a friendly match against Nicaragua.
