= Ander Vidorreta =

Spanish footballer

Personal information
- Full name: Ander Vidorreta Larrumbe
- Date of birth: 12 July 1997 (age 29)
- Place of birth: Soria, Spain
- Height: 1.88 m (6 ft 2 in)
- Position: Midfielder

Team information
- Current team: Pontevedra
- Number: 16

Youth career
- Numancia

Senior career*
Years	Team	Apps	(Gls)
2016–2019	Numancia B	89	(8)
2019–2020	Numancia	6	(0)
2020–2021	Tarazona	23	(2)
2021–2022	Avilés	31	(1)
2022–2023	Calahorra	36	(1)
2023–2025	Real Unión	69	(2)
2025–	Pontevedra	37	(1)
- * Club domestic league appearances and goals as of 9 June 2026

Ander Vidorreta Larrumbe (born 12 July 1997) is a Spanish footballer who plays as a central midfielder for Primera Federación club Pontevedra.

== Club career ==
Born in Soria, Castile and León, Vidorreta represented CD Numancia as a youth. He made his senior debut with the reserves on 27 August 2016, starting in a 7–0 Tercera División home routing of SD Almazán.

Vidorreta scored his senior goal on 17 December 2016, netting the opener in a 2–0 home defeat of CD Bupolsa. On 25 June 2019, after being an ever-present figure for the B-side, he was definitely promoted to the main squad after agreeing to a one-year deal.

On 8 December 2019, Vidorreta made his first team debut by starting in a 1–3 away loss against UD Las Palmas in the Segunda División championship. On 3 October of the following year, he moved to Segunda División B side SD Tarazona on a free transfer.

In July 2022, he signed with CD Calahorra of the Primera División RFEF.

On July 15, 2023, he signed with Real Unión Club of the Primera División RFEF.
