= Egoitz Jaio =

Spanish footballer

Personal information
- Full name: Egoitz Jaio Gabiola
- Date of birth: 13 August 1980 (age 46)
- Place of birth: Abadiño, Spain
- Height: 1.87 m (6 ft 2 in)
- Position: Centre back

Youth career
- 1994–1995: Abadiño
- 1995–1998: Athletic Bilbao

Senior career*
Years	Team	Apps	(Gls)
1998–1999	Basconia	26	(0)
1999–2002	Bilbao Athletic	100	(2)
2002–2004	Athletic Bilbao	0	(0)
2002–2003	→ Racing Ferrol (loan)	26	(1)
2003–2004	→ Algeciras (loan)	0	(0)
2004	→ Racing Ferrol (loan)	16	(0)
2004–2005	Racing Ferrol	27	(4)
2005–2006	Gimnàstic	30	(0)
2006–2013	Numancia	149	(5)
2013–2014	Wacker Innsbruck	7	(0)
2014–2015	Sestao	18	(0)
Total		399	(12)
- * Club domestic league appearances and goals

Egoitz Jaio Gabiola (born 13 August 1980) is a Spanish retired footballer who played as a central defender.

== Club career ==
Born in Abadiño, Biscay, Jaio spent his first professional years with Athletic Bilbao, but never made it past the reserves of the Basque Country giants, in Segunda División B. He resumed his career in Segunda División, consecutively with Racing de Ferrol (twice), Algeciras CF and Gimnàstic de Tarragona; as a starter with the latter club, he achieved promotion to La Liga in 2006.

That summer, Jaio moved teams also in the second division, joining CD Numancia and being regularly used during his stint. Aged almost 29, he made his top level debut in a 2–0 home win against Málaga CF on 2 May 2009 (he appeared precisely in the last five rounds, as the Sorians were already relegated).
