= Fran González (footballer, born 1998) =

Spanish footballer

Personal information
- Full name: Francisco Manuel González Verjara
- Date of birth: 13 August 1998 (age 28)
- Place of birth: Santanyí, Spain
- Height: 1.90 m (6 ft 3 in)
- Position: Centre-back

Team information
- Current team: Numancia
- Number: 5

Youth career
- Cala d'Or
- 2009–2010: Olímpic Felanitx
- 2010–2011: Manacor
- 2011–2012: Olímpic Felanitx
- 2012–2013: San Francisco
- 2013–2016: Mallorca
- 2015–2016: → San Francisco (loan)
- 2016–2017: San Francisco

Senior career*
Years	Team	Apps	(Gls)
2017–2021	Mallorca B	93	(3)
2021	Mallorca	0	(0)
2021–2023	Atlético Madrid B	54	(2)
2023–2024	Torreense	0	(0)
2024	→ Linares Deportivo (loan)	12	(0)
2025–2026	Atlético CP	26	(0)
2026–	Numancia	0	(0)
- * Club domestic league appearances and goals as of 19 September 2026

Francisco Manuel "Fran" González Verjara (born 13 August 1998) is a Spanish professional footballer who plays as a centre-back for Segunda Federación club Numancia.

== Club career ==
González was born in Calonge, Santanyí, Majorca, Balearic Islands, and represented Cala d'Or, Olímpic de Felanitx, Manacor, San Francisco and Mallorca as a youth. He made his debut with the latter's reserves on 19 August 2017, starting in a 1–0 home win against Binissalem.

González scored his first senior goal on 10 April 2019, netting his team's third in a 3–0 home win against former side Manacor. He made his first team debut on 6 January 2021, starting and scoring an own goal in a 2–2 away draw against Fuenlabrada, as his side was knocked out on penalties, for the season's Copa del Rey.

On 13 July 2021, González moved to another reserve team, Atlético Madrid B in the Tercera División RFEF.

On 30 August 2023, Liga Portugal 2 club Torreense announced the signing of González on a two-year contract. On 30 January, after having failed to make a league appearance for the Torres Vedras-based side, González was loaned to Spanish third tier side Linares Deportivo until the end of the 2023–24 season.

== Career statistics ==
=== Club ===
As of match played 11 June 2023

Appearances and goals by club, season and competition
Club	Season	League			National cup		League cup		Other		Total	
Club	Season	Division	Apps	Goals	Apps	Goals	Apps	Goals	Apps	Goals	Apps	Goals
Mallorca B	2017–18	Tercera División	25	0	—		—		3 (Note: Appearances in 2018 Tercera División play-offs)	0	28	0
Mallorca B	2018–19	Tercera División	27	1	—		—		5 (Note: Appearances in 2019 Tercera División play-offs)	0	32	1
Mallorca B	2019–20	Tercera División	22	1	—		—		0	0	22	1
Mallorca B	2020–21	Tercera División	19	1	—		—		3 (Note: Appearances in 2021 Tercera División play-offs)	0	22	1
Mallorca B	Total		93	3	—		—		11	0	104	3
Mallorca	2020–21	Segunda División	0	0	1	0	—		—		1	0
Atlético Madrid B	2021–22	Tercera División RFEF	28	2	—		—		—		28	2
Atlético Madrid B	2022–23	Segunda Federación	26	0	—		—		4 (Note: Appearances in 2023 Segunda Federación play-offs)	0	30	0
Atlético Madrid B	Total		54	2	—		—		4	0	58	2
Torreense	2023–24	Liga Portugal 2	0	0	0	0	0	0	0	0	0	0
Career total			147	5	1	0	0	0	15	0	163	5
