= Marcos Isla =

Spanish footballer

Personal information
- Full name: Marcos Fernández Isla
- Date of birth: 24 July 1996 (age 30)
- Place of birth: Valladolid, Spain
- Height: 1.92 m (6 ft 4 in)
- Position: Centre back

Team information
- Current team: Izarra
- Number: 6

Youth career
- Valladolid
- 2014–2015: UDC Sur

Senior career*
Years	Team	Apps	(Gls)
2015–2016	Atlético Tordesillas	26	(0)
2016–2017	Cristo Atlético	39	(4)
2017–2019	Numancia B	72	(4)
2018–2020	Numancia	0	(0)
2020	→ Tudelano (loan)	7	(0)
2020–2021	Ávila	21	(2)
2021–2022	Racing Rioja	31	(0)
2022–	Izarra	60	(1)
- * Club domestic league appearances and goals as of 15 May 2024

Marcos Fernández Isla (born 24 July 1996), sometimes known simply as Marcos, is a Spanish footballer who plays as a central defender for Izarra.

== Club career ==
Born in Valladolid, Castile and León, Marcos represented Real Valladolid and UDC Sur as a youth. In 2015, he moved to Tercera División side Atlético Tordesillas, and made his senior debut on 23 August of that year by playing the last ten minutes of a 1–0 home defeat of CD Palencia Balompié.

In July 2016, Marcos signed for CD Cristo Atlético still in the fourth division. Roughly one year later he moved to CD Numancia, being assigned to the reserves in the same category.

Marcos made his professional debut on 13 September 2018, starting and scoring his team's only in a 1–2 home loss against Sporting de Gijón, for the season's Copa del Rey. The following 25 June, he was definitely promoted to the main squad after agreeing to a one-year deal.

On 16 January 2020, after making no league appearances during the campaign, Marcos was loaned to Segunda División B side CD Tudelano until June.
