= Racing Murcia FC =

Association football club in Spain

Racing Murcia
- Full name: Racing Murcia City 1913 Fútbol Club
- Founded: 1 September 2013 (as DiTT Redmóvil AD)
- Dissolved: 2024
- Ground: Estadio Universitario
- Capacity: 7,500
- Chairman: Jose Montelongo
- Manager: Piero Lo Gato
- 2023–24: Tercera Federación – Group 13, 10th of 18 (relegated)
- Website: www.racingmurciacf.com
Home colours	Away colours

Racing Murcia City 1913 Fútbol Club was a football club based in Murcia, a district in center of Murcia Center, Murcia, Spain. Founded on 1 September 2013, they held home games at the Estadio Universitario. The club was the reserve team of Racing Cartagena Mar Menor FC.

== History ==
The club was founded on 1 September 2013 under the name of DiTT Redmóvil Asociación Deportiva, being registered in the Football Federation of the Region of Murcia for the 2014–15 season. In 2016, the club was renamed into Racing Murcia FC, after being in the Preferente Autonómica.

In 2020, Racing Murcia achieved promotion to Tercera División, while also qualifying for the Copa del Rey for the first time in their history. Funded by the Racing City Group, the club signed several former footballers to their organizational chart, such as Edwin Congo, and Paul Pogba's brother Mathias Pogba as a player. Also in June 2021, the club appointed former Real Madrid and Liverpool legend Fernando Morientes as international director.

In January 2021, president Morris Pagniello signed former Real Madrid star Royston Drente. In January 2022, Indo-Canadian businessman and former sportsman Steve Nijaar was announced as the new president. Jose Montelogo was announced as the new chairman of the club and new partner of Racing City Group after the 2022-23 season.

On 7 July 2023, after the Racing City Group acquired Mar Menor FC and renamed the club to Racing Cartagena Mar Menor FC, Racing Murcia became their reserve team. In the following year, after the club's relegation, Racing Murcia was also relegated to the Preferente Autonómica and subsequently ceased to play.

== Season to season ==
Season	Tier	Division	Place	Copa del Rey
2014–15	7	2ª Aut.	1st	
2015–16	6	1ª Aut.	7th	
2016–17	5	Pref. Aut.	13th	
2017–18	5	Pref. Aut.	15th	
2018–19	5	Pref. Aut.	4th	
2019–20	5	Pref. Aut.	1st	
2020–21	4	3ª	3rd / 5th	First round
2021–22	5	3ª RFEF	3rd	
2022–23	5	3ª Fed.	4th	
2023–24	5	3ª Fed.	10th	N/A (Note: Reserve team of Racing Cartagena MM.)

- 1 season in Tercera División
- 3 seasons in Tercera Federación/Tercera División RFEF

== Players ==
=== First-team squad ===
As of 7 January 2021

Note: Flags indicate national team as defined under FIFA eligibility rules; some limited exceptions apply. Players may hold more than one non-FIFA nationality.

No.	Pos.	Nation	Player
1	GK	ESP	Ximo Ballester
3	DF	ESP	Mario Martínez
4	DF	ESP	Urzaiz
5	MF	ESP	Monty
6	MF	NED	Royston Drenthe
7	FW	ESP	Joaquín Parra
8	MF	ESP	Manolo
9	FW	ESP	Carlos Álvarez (captain)
10	MF	ESP	Fran Moreno
11	FW	ESP	Chupi
12	DF	ARG	Juan Prefacio
13	GK	ITA	Lorenzo Leone

No.	Pos.	Nation	Player
14	MF	ESP	Chema
16	MF	JPN	Yuya Kamon
17	FW	ESP	Pekes
18	MF	ESP	Cristo Martín
19	FW	ESP	Nico Carrasco
20	FW	ESP	Nico González
21	DF	ESP	Sergi Valls
22	DF	ESP	Juanjo García
23	DF	COL	Juan Sebastián Marín
26	DF	ALB	Jurgen Nikolli
29	MF	LBN	Joseph Khalife
