= Estadio Ruta de la Plata =

Stadium

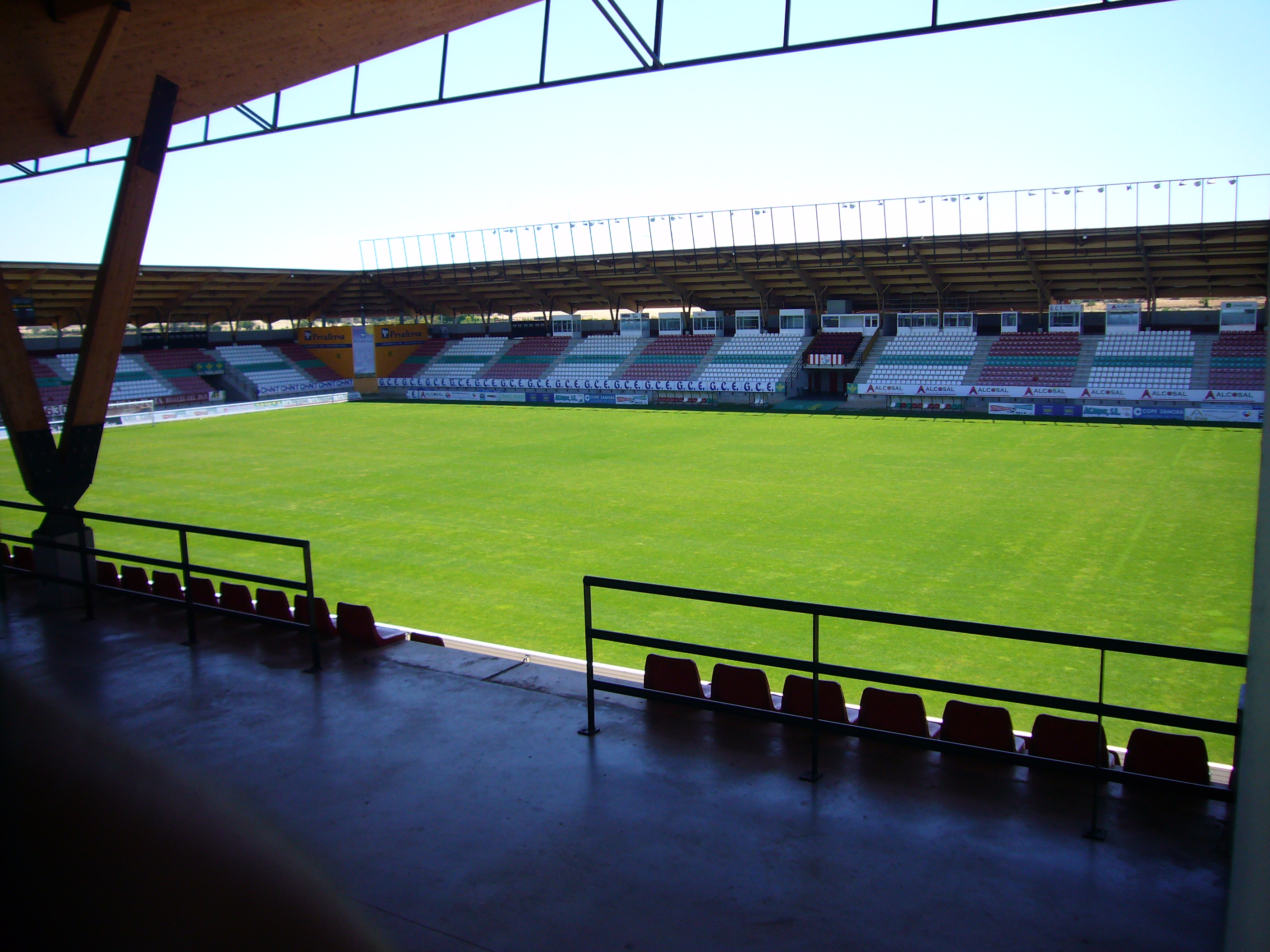
- Estadio Ruta de la Plata
- Interactive map of Estadio Ruta de la Plata
- Location: Zamora, Spain
- Coordinates: 41°29′11″N 5°44′53″W
- Owner: Municipality of Zamora
- Capacity: 7,813
- Surface: grass

Construction
- Opened: September 1, 2002

Tenant
- Zamora CF

The Estadio Ruta de la Plata (literal English translation: Silver Road Stadium) is a stadium located in Zamora, Spain. Property of the municipality, it is the home stadium of Zamora CF. It was inaugurated on 1 September 2002, with a match between Zamora and CD Ourense.

It is equipped with both an artificial grass and natural grass surface. Its capacity is 7,813 spectators.

The stadium was constructed as a replacement for Zamora's previous field, La Vaguada, was obsolete due to its age (fifteen years), its reduced capacity (approximately 4,000) and the general mediocrity of the facilities.

A notable match held at the stadium was a European Under-21 qualifier between Spain and Armenia on 1 April 2003, which resulted in a 5–0 victory for Spain.
