= Zamora CF =

Spanish association football club

Zamora
- Full name: Zamora Club de Fútbol
- Nicknames: Rojiblancos; Viriatos
- Founded: 23 October 1968; 58 years ago
- Stadium: Ruta de la Plata
- Capacity: 7,813
- Owner: Grupo Paéz
- President: Javier Páez Ruiz de Lopera
- Head coach: Óscar Cano
- League: Primera Federación – Group 1
- 2025–26: Primera Federación – Group 1, 3rd of 20
- Website: zamoracf.es
| Home colours | Away colours | Third colours |

Zamora Club de Fútbol is a Spanish football team based in Zamora, in the autonomous community of Castile and León. Founded in 1968 it plays in Primera Federación – Group 1, holding home games at Estadio Ruta de la Plata, with a capacity of 7,813 seaters.

== History ==
Zamora CF was founded on October 23, 1968. But officially the act number 1 of the club is dated November 7, 1968, when the club was registered in the Western Federation in Valladolid. The club started in the Primera Regional in 1969. In the 1970–71 season it became its champion and promoted to Tercera División.

== Season to season ==
| Season | Tier | Division | Place | Copa del Rey |
|---|---|---|---|---|
| 1968–69 | 4 | 1ª Reg. | 1st | |
| 1969–70 | 4 | 1ª Reg. | 2nd | |
| 1970–71 | 4 | Reg. Pref. | 1st | |
| 1971–72 | 3 | 3ª | 9th | |
| 1972–73 | 3 | 3ª | 11th | |
| 1973–74 | 3 | 3ª | 15th | |
| 1974–75 | 4 | Reg. Pref. | 1st | |
| 1975–76 | 3 | 3ª | 16th | |
| 1976–77 | 3 | 3ª | 15th | |
| 1977–78 | 4 | 3ª | 1st | |
| 1978–79 | 3 | 2ª B | 9th | |
| 1979–80 | 3 | 2ª B | 6th | |
| 1980–81 | 3 | 2ª B | 16th | |
| 1981–82 | 3 | 2ª B | 3rd | |
| 1982–83 | 4 | 3ª | 2nd | |
| 1983–84 | 3 | 2ª B | 13th | |
| 1984–85 | 3 | 2ª B | 11th | |
| 1985–86 | 3 | 2ª B | 11th | |
| 1986–87 | 4 | 3ª | 5th | |
| 1987–88 | 4 | 3ª | 6th | |

| Season | Tier | Division | Place | Copa del Rey |
|---|---|---|---|---|
| 1988–89 | 4 | 3ª | 8th | |
| 1989–90 | 4 | 3ª | 9th | |
| 1990–91 | 4 | 3ª | 2nd | |
| 1991–92 | 4 | 3ª | 3rd | |
| 1992–93 | 4 | 3ª | 1st | |
| 1993–94 | 4 | 3ª | 5th | |
| 1994–95 | 4 | 3ª | 4th | |
| 1995–96 | 4 | 3ª | 2nd | |
| 1996–97 | 4 | 3ª | 4th | |
| 1997–98 | 3 | 2ª B | 16th | |
| 1998–99 | 4 | 3ª | 1st | |
| 1999–2000 | 3 | 2ª B | 12th | |
| 2000–01 | 3 | 2ª B | 3rd | |
| 2001–02 | 3 | 2ª B | 15th | |
| 2002–03 | 3 | 2ª B | 2nd | |
| 2003–04 | 3 | 2ª B | 8th | |
| 2004–05 | 3 | 2ª B | 4th | |
| 2005–06 | 3 | 2ª B | 13th | Round of 16 |
| 2006–07 | 3 | 2ª B | 9th | |
| 2007–08 | 3 | 2ª B | 3rd | |

| Season | Tier | Division | Place | Copa del Rey |
|---|---|---|---|---|
| 2008–09 | 3 | 2ª B | 4th | |
| 2009–10 | 3 | 2ª B | 14th | |
| 2010–11 | 3 | 2ª B | 13th | |
| 2011–12 | 3 | 2ª B | 11th | |
| 2012–13 | 3 | 2ª B | 16th | |
| 2013–14 | 3 | 2ª B | 7th | |
| 2014–15 | 3 | 2ª B | 18th | Second round |
| 2015–16 | 4 | 3ª | 1st | |
| 2016–17 | 4 | 3ª | 6th | First round |
| 2017–18 | 4 | 3ª | 9th | |
| 2018–19 | 4 | 3ª | 1st | |
| 2019–20 | 4 | 3ª | 1st | Second round |
| 2020–21 | 3 | 2ª B | 3rd | Second round |
| 2021–22 | 3 | 1ª RFEF | 17th | |
| 2022–23 | 4 | 2ª Fed. | 5th | |
| 2023–24 | 4 | 2ª Fed. | 3rd | Second round |
| 2024–25 | 3 | 1ª Fed. | 9th | Second round |
| 2025–26 | 3 | 1ª Fed. | 3rd | |
| 2026–27 | 3 | 1ª Fed. | | TBD |

- 4 seasons in Primera Federación/Primera División RFEF
- 25 seasons in Segunda División B
- 2 seasons in Segunda Federación
- 24 seasons in Tercera División

== Honours ==
- Tercera División
  - Champions (6): 1977–78, 1992–93, 1998–99, 2015–16, 2018–19, 2019–20
- Trofeo Colombino
  - Winners (1): 2025

== Players ==
=== Current squad ===
As of 4 November 2026

Note: Flags indicate national team as defined under FIFA eligibility rules; some limited exceptions apply. Players may hold more than one non-FIFA nationality.

| No. | Pos. | Nation | Player |
|---|---|---|---|
| 1 | GK | ESP | Iker Piedra |
| 2 | DF | ESP | Guillem Rodríguez |
| 3 | DF | ESP | Luismi Luengo |
| 4 | DF | ESP | Unai Dufur |
| 5 | DF | ESP | Aleix Gorjón |
| 7 | FW | ESP | Javier Carbonell |
| 8 | MF | ESP | Juanje Rodríguez |
| 9 | FW | ESP | Mario Losada |
| 10 | MF | ESP | Carlos Ramos |
| 11 | FW | ESP | Jaime Sancho |
| 12 | DF | ESP | José Albert (on loan from Castellón) |
| 13 | GK | ESP | Fran Árbol (on loan from Granada) |

| No. | Pos. | Nation | Player |
|---|---|---|---|
| 14 | DF | ESP | Diego Moreno |
| 15 | MF | ESP | Mauro Costa (on loan from Tenerife) |
| 16 | MF | ESP | Isaiah Navarro |
| 17 | MF | ESP | Fabián Urzain |
| 18 | DF | ESP | Iago Indias |
| 19 | FW | ESP | Pau Mascaró |
| 20 | FW | ESP | Izan Yurrieta |
| 21 | MF | ESP | Alex Hidalgo |
| 22 | FW | ESP | Dani Fernández (on loan from Girona) |
| 23 | DF | ESP | Eudald Vergés |
| 24 | MF | ESP | Eric Gómez |

=== Youth team ===
Note: Flags indicate national team as defined under FIFA eligibility rules; some limited exceptions apply. Players may hold more than one non-FIFA nationality.

| No. | Pos. | Nation | Player |
|---|---|---|---|
| 27 | DF | SEN | Mayoro Cherif |
| 29 | FW | ESP | Diego Sánchez |

=== Out on loan ===
Note: Flags indicate national team as defined under FIFA eligibility rules; some limited exceptions apply. Players may hold more than one non-FIFA nationality.

| No. | Pos. | Nation | Player |
|---|---|---|---|
| — | FW | MAR | Abde Damar (at Al-Madina until 30 June 2027) |
