= CD Numancia B =

Association football club in Spain

Numancia B
- Full name: Club Deportivo Numancia de Soria, S.A.D. "B"
- Nickname: Rojillos (Reds)
- Founded: 1979 (as Soria CF)
- Ground: Francisco Rubio, Soria, Castile and León, Spain
- Capacity: 1,000
- President: Moisés Israel Garzón
- Head coach: Álex Huerta
- League: Primera Regional – Group A
- 2025–26: Tercera Federación – Group 8, 18th of 18 (relegated)
Home colours	Away colours

Club Deportivo Numancia de Soria "B" is the reserve team of CD Numancia, sports club from Soria. The club is named after the ancient Celtiberian town of Numantia, near present-day Soria. Founded in 1979, currently plays in Primera Regional – Group A, holding home games at Ciudad del Fútbol Francisco Rubio Garcés, with a 1,000-seat capacity.

== Season to season ==
- As Soria CF

Season	Tier	Division	Place	Copa del Rey
1980–81	7	2ª Reg.	1st	
1981–82	6	1ª Reg.	13th	
1982–83	5	Reg. Pref.	9th	
1983–84	5	Reg. Pref.	11th	
1984–85	5	Reg. Pref.	10th	
1985–86	5	Reg. Pref.	16th	
1986–87	5	Reg. Pref.	14th	
1987–88	5	Reg. Pref.	8th	

- As CD Numancia Promesas

Season	Tier	Division	Place	Copa del Rey
1988–89	5	Reg. Pref.	11th	

- As CD Numancia B

Season	Tier	Division	Place
1989–1999	—	Regional	—
1999–2000	5	1ª Reg.	4th
2000–01	5	1ª Reg.	1st
2001–02	4	3ª	5th
2002–03	4	3ª	11th
2003–04	4	3ª	11th
2004–05	4	3ª	7th
2005–06	4	3ª	11th
2006–07	4	3ª	3rd
2007–08	4	3ª	9th
2008–09	4	3ª	13th
2009–10	4	3ª	9th
2010–11	4	3ª	9th
2011–12	4	3ª	10th
2012–13	4	3ª	11th
2013–14	4	3ª	5th
2014–15	4	3ª	2nd
2015–16	4	3ª	10th
2016–17	4	3ª	8th
2017–18	4	3ª	8th

Season	Tier	Division	Place
2018–19	4	3ª	4th
2019–20	4	3ª	4th
2020–21	4	3ª	3rd / 5th
2021–22	5	3ª RFEF	12th
2022–23	5	3ª Fed.	16th
2023–24	6	1ª Reg.	7th
2024–25	6	1ª Reg.	2nd
2025–26	5	3ª Fed.	18th
2026–27	6	1ª Reg.	

- 20 seasons in Tercera División
- 3 seasons in Tercera Federación/Tercera División RFEF

== Current squad ==
As of 9 September 2018

Note: Flags indicate national team as defined under FIFA eligibility rules; some limited exceptions apply. Players may hold more than one non-FIFA nationality.

No.	Pos.	Nation	Player
—	GK	ESP	Roberto Jara
—	GK	ESP	Taliby
—	GK	ESP	Toni Varea
—	DF	ESP	Raúl Gil
—	DF	ESP	Diego Cámara
—	DF	ESP	Marcos Isla
—	DF	ESP	Rafael Checa
—	DF	ESP	Juan Silva
—	DF	ESP	Álvaro Mateo
—	MF	ESP	Ander Vidorreta

No.	Pos.	Nation	Player
—	MF	ESP	Raúl Vallejo
—	MF	ESP	Julen Ekiza
—	MF	ESP	Guillermo
—	MF	ESP	Beli
—	MF	ESP	Imanol Arana
—	MF	ESP	Ismael Medrano
—	FW	ESP	Alfredo
—	FW	ESP	Jorge Ferrer
—	FW	MAR	Moha

== Former players ==
- (Mali) Binke Diabaté
- (Spain) Diego de Miguel
- (Spain) Luis Valcarce
- (Spain) Pablo Valcarce
- (Spain) César Vinuesa
- (Spain) Pablo Sanz Martínez
