= SD Almazán =

Association football club in Spain

Almazán
- Full name: Sociedad Deportiva Almazán
- Founded: 1967
- Ground: La Arboleda, Almazán, Castile and León, Spain
- Capacity: 2,000
- Chairman: Juan José Hernando
- Manager: Diego Rojas
- League: Tercera Federación – Group 8
- 2024–25: Tercera Federación – Group 8, 13th of 19
Home colours	Away colours

Sociedad Deportiva Almazán is a Spanish football team based in Almazán, Soria, in the autonomous community of Castile and León. Founded in 1967 it plays in Tercera Federación – Group 8, holding home matches at Estadio La Arboleda, with a capacity of 2,000 seats.

== Season to season ==
Season	Tier	Division	Place	Copa del Rey
1967–68	5	2ª Reg.	3rd	
1968–69	6	2ª Reg.	1st	
1969–70	5	1ª Reg.	6th	
1970–71	5	1ª Reg.	1st	
1971–72	4	Reg. Pref.	12th	
1972–73	4	Reg. Pref.	15th	
1973–74	4	Reg. Pref.	18th	
1974–75	5	1ª Reg.	12th	
1975–76	5	1ª Reg.	1st	
1976–77	4	Reg. Pref.	6th	
1977–78	4	3ª	17th	
1978–79	4	3ª	20th	First round
1979–80	5	Reg. Pref.	1st	
1980–81	4	3ª	19th	
1981–82	5	Reg. Pref.	9th	
1982–83	5	Reg. Pref.	8th	
1983–84	5	Reg. Pref.	6th	
1984–85	5	Reg. Pref.	8th	
1985–86	5	Reg. Pref.	8th	
1986–87	4	3ª	17th	

Season	Tier	Division	Place	Copa del Rey
1987–88	4	3ª	7th	
1988–89	4	3ª	5th	
1989–90	4	3ª	11th	
1990–91	4	3ª	3rd	
1991–92	4	3ª	6th	First round
1992–93	4	3ª	12th	Second round
1993–94	4	3ª	17th	
1994–95	4	3ª	15th	
1995–96	4	3ª	6th	
1996–97	4	3ª	18th	
1997–98	5	Reg. Pref.	4th	
1998–99	5	Reg. Pref.	1st	
1999–2000	4	3ª	17th	
2000–01	5	1ª Reg.	2nd	
2001–02	4	3ª	17th	
2002–03	4	3ª	17th	
2003–04	4	3ª	14th	
2004–05	4	3ª	16th	
2005–06	4	3ª	20th	
2006–07	5	1ª Reg.	2nd	

Season	Tier	Division	Place	Copa del Rey
2007–08	4	3ª	11th	
2008–09	4	3ª	16th	
2009–10	4	3ª	12th	
2010–11	4	3ª	6th	
2011–12	4	3ª	12th	
2012–13	4	3ª	13th	
2013–14	4	3ª	7th	
2014–15	4	3ª	6th	
2015–16	4	3ª	11th	
2016–17	4	3ª	5th	
2017–18	4	3ª	14th	
2018–19	4	3ª	12th	
2019–20	4	3ª	10th	
2020–21	4	3ª	7th / 1st	
2021–22	5	3ª RFEF	2nd	
2022–23	5	3ª Fed.	6th	First round
2023–24	5	3ª Fed.	11th	
2024–25	5	3ª Fed.	13th	
2025–26	5	3ª Fed.	7th	
2026–27	5	3ª Fed.		

- 34 seasons in Tercera División
- 6 seasons in Tercera Federación/Tercera División RFEF
