= 2020–21 CD Castellón season =

CD Castellón
2020–21 season
- President: Vicente Montesinos
- Head coach: Óscar Cano (until 11 January); Juan Carlos Garrido (from 12 January to 21 May); Sergi Escobar (from 22 May)
- Stadium: Nou Estadi Castàlia
- Segunda División: 21st (relegated)
- Copa del Rey: Second round
- Top goalscorer: League: Jamelli (7); All: Jamelli (7)
Home colours	Away colours

The 2020–21 Club Deportivo Castellón season was the club's 99th season in existence and the club's first season back in the second division of Spanish football, the Segunda División. In addition to the domestic league, Castellón participated in this season's edition of the Copa del Rey. The season covered the period from 26 July 2020 to 30 June 2021.

== Players ==
=== First-team squad ===
As of 23 June 2021

Note: Flags indicate national team as defined under FIFA eligibility rules; some limited exceptions apply. Players may hold more than one non-FIFA nationality.

No.	Pos.	Nation	Player
1	GK	ESP	Álvaro Campos (3rd captain)
2	MF	SLO	Rene Krhin
4	MF	ESP	Arturo Molina (on loan from Levante)
5	DF	ESP	Eneko Satrústegui
6	MF	ESP	Marc Castells (vice-captain)
7	FW	ESP	Juanto Ortuño
8	MF	ESP	Carles Salvador
9	FW	ESP	David Cubillas (captain)
10	MF	ESP	Rubén Díez
11	FW	ESP	César Díaz
12	FW	SRB	Igor Zlatanović (on loan from Mallorca)
13	GK	ESP	Óscar Whalley
14	MF	FRA	Yann Bodiger

No.	Pos.	Nation	Player
15	DF	ESP	Carlos Delgado
16	MF	ESP	Rafa Gálvez (4th captain)
17	MF	ESP	Víctor García
18	DF	ESP	Iago Indias
19	MF	ESP	Josep Señé (on loan from Mallorca)
20	MF	POR	Gus Ledes
21	MF	ESP	Jorge Fernández
22	DF	ESP	Joseba Muguruza
23	MF	ESP	Marc Mateu
24	DF	ESP	Javi Moyano
25	FW	ESP	Jonathan Soriano
27	MF	ESP	Paolo Fernandes
28	GK	ESP	Felipe Galvis

=== Other players under contract ===
Note: Flags indicate national team as defined under FIFA eligibility rules; some limited exceptions apply. Players may hold more than one non-FIFA nationality.

No.	Pos.	Nation	Player
—	DF	ESP	Francisco Regalón

=== Reserve team ===
Note: Flags indicate national team as defined under FIFA eligibility rules; some limited exceptions apply. Players may hold more than one non-FIFA nationality.

No.	Pos.	Nation	Player
33	MF	ESP	Jorge Saiz
34	DF	ESP	Aarón Romero

=== Out on loan ===
Note: Flags indicate national team as defined under FIFA eligibility rules; some limited exceptions apply. Players may hold more than one non-FIFA nationality.

No.	Pos.	Nation	Player
—	DF	ESP	Guillem Jaime (at Gimnàstic until 30 June 2021)
—	DF	ESP	Alejandro Marcos (at Llagostera until 30 June 2021)
—	MF	ESP	Bilal Kandoussi (at SD Logroñés until 30 June 2021)
—	MF	ESP	Jesús Carrillo (at Murcia until 30 June 2021)

No.	Pos.	Nation	Player
—	MF	ESP	Álvaro Fidalgo (at Club América until 30 June 2021)
—	FW	ESP	Alfredo Gutiérrez (at Atlético Levante until 30 June 2021)
—	FW	ESP	Jordi Sánchez (at UCAM Murcia until 30 June 2021)

== Transfers ==
=== In ===
Date	Player	From	Type	Fee	Ref
5 October 2020	(Spain) Arturo Molina	Levante	Loan		

=== Out ===
Date	Player	From	Type	Fee	Ref

== Pre-season and friendlies ==
Win Draw Loss Fixtures

28 August 2020 Friendly	Albacete	1–1	Castellón	Albacete, Spain
19:00 CEST (UTC+2)		Report		Stadium: Ciudad Deportiva Andrés Iniesta; Attendance: 0

1 September 2020 Friendly	Mallorca	2–0	Castellón	San Pedro del Pinatar, Spain
20:00 CEST (UTC+2)	Alegría 24'; Dani Rodríguez (yellow card) 42'; Sastre 45+2'; Sedlar (yellow card) 78'; A. Sánchez (yellow card) 80'; Quintana (yellow card) 90+1'	Report		Stadium: Pinatar Arena; Attendance: 0 Referee: Jorge Escudero Díaz

6 September 2020 Friendly	Levante	1–0	Castellón	Buñol, Spain
19:30 CEST (UTC+2)	Coke 11'	Report		Stadium: Ciudad Deportiva de Buñol; Attendance: 0 Referee: Andrés Fuentes Molina

== Competitions ==
=== Overview ===
Competition	First match	Last match	Starting round	Final position	Record							
Competition	First match	Last match	Starting round	Final position	Pld	W	D	L	GF	GA	GD	Win %
Segunda División	12 September 2020	30 May 2021	Matchday 1	21st	42	11	8	23	35	54	−19	26.19
Copa del Rey	16 December 2020	6 January 2021	First round	Second round	2	1	0	1	2	2	+0	50.00
Total					44	12	8	24	37	56	−19	27.27

Source: Soccerway

=== Segunda División ===
==== League table ====
Pos	Team	Pld	W	D	L	GF	GA	GD	Pts	Promotion, qualification or relegation
18	Lugo	42	11	14	17	38	53	−15	47	
19	Sabadell (R)	42	11	13	18	40	48	−8	46	Relegation to Primera División RFEF
20	UD Logroñés (R)	42	11	11	20	28	53	−25	44	Relegation to Primera División RFEF
21	Castellón (R)	42	11	8	23	35	54	−19	41	Relegation to Primera División RFEF
22	Albacete (R)	42	9	11	22	30	53	−23	38	Relegation to Primera División RFEF

Source: LaLiga
Rules for classification: 1) points; 2) head-to-head points; 3) head-to-head goal difference; 4) goal difference; 5) number of goals scored
(R) Relegated

==== Results summary ====
Overall								Home						Away					
Pld	W	D	L	GF	GA	GD	Pts	W	D	L	GF	GA	GD	W	D	L	GF	GA	GD
42	11	8	23	35	54	−19	41	9	1	11	21	20	+1	2	7	12	14	34	−20

Source: La Liga

==== Results by round ====
Round	1	2	3	4	5	6	7	8	9	10	11	12	13	14	15	16	17	18	19	20	21	22	23	24	25	26	27	28	29	30	31	32	33	34	35	36	37	38	39	40	41	42
Ground	A	H	A	H	A	H	A	H	H	A	A	H	A	H	A	H	A	H	A	H	A	H	A	H	H	A	H	A	H	A	H	A	H	A	H	A	H	A	H	A	H	A
Result	W	L	D	W	D	L	L	L	L	L	L	W	L	L	D	W	L	W	D	L	L	W	L	L	L	L	W	D	W	D	L	W	W	L	W	D	D	L	L	L	L	L
Position	21	21	21	21	21	21	21	21	21	21	21	21	21	21	21	21	21	21	21	21	21	17	20	21	22	22	21	21	19	18	20	17	16	18	17	16	18	18	18	20	21	21

Source: La Liga
A = Away; H = Home; W = Win; D = Draw; L = Loss

==== Matches ====
The league fixtures were announced on 31 August 2020.

12 September 2020 1	Ponferradina	1–2	Castellón	Ponferrada
16:00 CEST (UTC+2)	Doncel 21'	Report	Juanto 14'; Cubillas 90+8'	Stadium: El Toralín; Attendance: 0 (Note: The match was played behind closed doors due to the COVID-19 pandemic in Spain.); Referee: David Gálvez Rascón

19 September 2020 2	Castellón	0–1	Málaga	Castellón de la Plana
18:15 CEST (UTC+2)		Report	Ramón 18'	Stadium: Nou Estadi Castàlia; Attendance: 0 Referee: Rafael Sánchez López

26 September 2020 3	UD Logroñés	1–1	Castellón	Logroño
18:15 CEST (UTC+2)	Roni 90+3'	Report	Fidalgo (yellow card) 19'; Gálvez (yellow card) 25' (yellow-red card) 85'; Jamelli 73'	Stadium: Estadio Las Gaunas; Attendance: 0 Referee: Iosu Galech Apezteguía

4 October 2020 4	Castellón	2–0	Leganés	Castellón de la Plana
18:15 CEST (UTC+2)	Miquel 31' (o.g.); Jordi Sánchez (yellow card) 37'; Muguruza (yellow card) 67'; Zlatanović 90+2'	Report	Bastón (yellow card) 90+1'	Stadium: Nou Estadi Castàlia; Attendance: 0 Referee: Iñaki Bikandi Garrido

11 October 2020 5	Fuenlabrada	1–1	Castellón	Fuenlabrada
12:00 CEST (UTC+2)	Cristóbal 18'; Diéguez (yellow card) 38'; Ciss (yellow card) 40'; Moi (yellow card) 57'	Report	Víctor García (red card) 32'; Jamelli (yellow card) 42'; Lapeña 55'; Mateu (yellow card) 85'	Stadium: Fernando Torres; Attendance: 0 Referee: Aitor Gorostegui Fernández Ortega

17 October 2020 6	Castellón	0–1	Lugo	Castellón de la Plana
20:30 CEST (UTC+2)	Lapeña (yellow card) 5'; Gálvez (yellow card) 90+4'	Report	Alende (yellow card) 8'; Iriome (yellow card) 67', (goal) 90+4'; Carrillo (yellow card) 90+5'	Stadium: Nou Estadi Castàlia; Attendance: 0 Referee: Rubén Ávalos Barrera

21 October 2020 7	Las Palmas	2–1	Castellón	Las Palmas
19:00 CEST (UTC+2)	Araujo 49'; Claudio (yellow card) 60'; Rober 72'; González (yellow card) 90'	Report	Señé (yellow card) 44'; Gálvez 65'	Stadium: Estadio Gran Canaria; Attendance: 0 Referee: Oliver De La Fuente

24 October 2020 8	Castellón	0–1	Girona	Castellón de la Plana
20:30 CEST (UTC+2)	Jamelli (yellow card) 14'; Mateu (yellow card) 69'; Luís Gustavo (yellow card) 76'; Gálvez (yellow card) 83'	Report	Franquesa 42'; Sylla (yellow card) 77'	Stadium: Nou Estadi Castàlia; Attendance: 0 Referee: Miguel Ángel Ortiz Arias

28 October 2020 9	Castellón	1–2	Almería	Castellón de la Plana
19:00 CET (UTC+1)	Fernández 61'; Gálvez (yellow card) 90'; Mateu (red card) 90'	Report	Corpas 43'; Villalba 47'; Costa (yellow card) 50'; Lazo (yellow card) 81'; Sadiq (yellow card) 90+5'; Petrović (yellow card) 90+5'	Stadium: Nou Estadi Castàlia; Attendance: 0 Referee: Eduardo Prieto Iglesias

2 November 2020 10	Sporting Gijón	1–0	Castellón	Gijón
18:15 CET (UTC+1)	Saúl García (yellow card) 33'; Đurđević 40'	Report	Lapeña (yellow card) 68'; Molina (yellow card) 79' (yellow-red card) 90+2'; Señé (yellow card) 85'	Stadium: El Molinón; Attendance: 0 Referee: Iosu Galech Apezteguía

8 November 2020 11	Oviedo	4–0	Castellón	Oviedo
18:15 CET (UTC+1)	Sangalli 10'; Borja Sánchez 46'; González 53', 84'; Arribas (yellow card) 83'	Report	Jordi Sánchez (yellow card) 33'; Cubillas (yellow card) 87'	Stadium: Carlos Tartiere; Attendance: 0 Referee: José Antonio López Toca

15 November 2020 12	Castellón	2–1	Cartagena	Castellón de la Plana
18:30 CET (UTC+1)	Señé (yellow card) 40'; Fidalgo (yellow card) 51'; Jamelli 64', 76'; Díaz (yellow card) 79'; Campos (yellow card) 90+2'	Report	Aguza (yellow card) 69'; Castro 80'; Gil (yellow card) 90+1'	Stadium: Nou Estadi Castàlia; Attendance: 0 Referee: Oliver De La Fuente

21 November 2020 13	Rayo Vallecano	2–1	Castellón	Madrid
18:15 CET (UTC+1)	Martín 14', 44'; Iván Martos (yellow card) 90+1'	Report	Fidalgo (yellow card) 36'; Mateu 62' (pen.); Gálvez (yellow card) 65'; Jaime (yellow card) 69'; Señé (yellow card) 82'; Zlatanović (yellow card) 86'	Stadium: Campo de Fútbol de Vallecas; Attendance: 0 Referee: Francisco José Hernández Maeso

24 November 2020 14	Castellón	0–2	Alcorcón	Castellón de la Plana
19:00 CET (UTC+1)	Fidalgo (yellow card) 23'; Luís Gustavo (yellow card) 44'; Cubillas (yellow card) 71'; Satrústegui (yellow card) 87'	Report	Gual 31' (pen.), 45' (pen.); Laure (yellow card) 56'; Álvaro (red card) 82'; José León (yellow card) 90+1'	Stadium: Nou Estadi Castàlia; Attendance: 0 Referee: Jon Ander González Esteban

28 November 2020 15	Mirandés	1–1	Castellón	Miranda de Ebro
20:30 CET (UTC+1)	Jackson 12'	Report	Víctor García (yellow card) 63'; Cubillas 68'; Satrústegui (yellow card) 80'	Stadium: Estadio Municipal de Anduva; Attendance: 0 Referee: Gorka Sagues Oscoz

2 December 2020 16	Castellón	1–0	Zaragoza	Castellón de la Plana
21:00 CET (UTC+1)	Díaz 84'; Molina (yellow card) 90+2'	Report	Chavarría (yellow card) 26'; Vigaray (yellow card) 89'	Stadium: Nou Estadi Castàlia; Attendance: 0 Referee: Daniel Ocón Arráiz

7 December 2020 17	Mallorca	3–1	Castellón	Palma de Mallorca
21:00 CET (UTC+1)	Prats 8', 55'; Sevilla 12'; Sedlar (yellow card) 72'	Report	Satrústegui 73', (yellow card) 86'	Stadium: Visit Mallorca Stadium; Attendance: 0 Referee: Rafael Sánchez López

12 December 2020 18	Castellón	3–0	Albacete	Castellón de la Plana
18:15 CET (UTC+1)	Satrústegui (yellow card) 17'; Mateu 27' (pen.); Jaime (yellow card) 31'; Carlos Delgado (yellow card) 52'; Zlatanović 83' 90+1'	Report	Sepp Mvondo (yellow card) 9'; Gorosito (yellow card) 29'; Benito (yellow card) 29'; Jiménez (yellow card) 87' (yellow-red card) 87'; Azamoum (yellow card) 88'	Stadium: Nou Estadi Castàlia; Attendance: 0 Referee: Francisco José Hernández Maeso

19 December 2020 19	Sabadell	1–1	Castellón	Sabadell
16:00 CET (UTC+1)	Jaime Sánchez (yellow card) 25'; Ibiza (yellow card) 54'; Martínez (yellow card) 90'; Querol 90+3'	Report	Satrústegui 45+1'; Señé (yellow card) 87'; Jordi Sánchez (yellow card) 90+5'	Stadium: Estadi de la Nova Creu Alta; Attendance: 0 Referee: Luis Mario Milla Alvéndiz

3 January 2021 20	Castellón	0–1	Tenerife	Castellón de la Plana
14:00 CET (UTC+1)	Jamelli (yellow card) 53'; Díaz (yellow card) 90+2'	Report	Bermejo (yellow card) 24'; Apeh (yellow card) 30'; Sanz (yellow card) 49'; Alonso (yellow card) 59'; Pomares 66'; Vada (yellow card) 90+4'	Stadium: Nou Estadi Castàlia; Attendance: 0 Referee: Rubén Ávalos Barrera

10 January 2021 21	Espanyol	2–0	Castellón	Cornellà de Llobregat
21:00 CET (UTC+1)	Melamed 7', (yellow card) 31'; Puado 36'; Embarba (yellow card) 80'	Report		Stadium: RCDE Stadium; Attendance: 0 Referee: Oliver De La Fuente

24 January 2021 22	Castellón	2–0	Sporting Gijón	Castellón de la Plana
18:15 CET (UTC+1)	Delgado (yellow card) 17'; Cubillas 20'; Salvador (yellow card) 24'; Indias (yellow card) 43'; Luís Gustavo 53'	Report	Milovanov (yellow card) 26'; Díaz (yellow card) 73'	Stadium: Nou Estadi Castàlia; Attendance: 0 Referee: Álvaro Moreno Aragón

30 January 2021 23	Almería	3–1	Castellón	Almería
21:00 CET (UTC+1)	Corpas 26'; Sadiq 78'; Cuenca 80'	Report	Jamelli 61'; Gálvez (yellow card) 87'	Stadium: Estadio de los Juegos Mediterráneos; Attendance: 0 Referee: Iñaki Bikandi Garrido

7 February 2021 24	Castellón	0–1	Mirandés	Castellón de la Plana
18:15 CET (UTC+1)		Report	Martín 66'; Moreno (yellow card) 90+1'	Stadium: Nou Estadi Castàlia; Attendance: 0 Referee: Francisco José Hernández Maeso

15 February 2021 25	Castellón	1–2	Fuenlabrada	Castellón de la Plana
19:00 CET (UTC+1)	Jamelli (yellow card) 12'; Bodiger 37' (pen.); Gálvez (yellow card) 41'; Cubillas (yellow card) 45+1'; Fernández (yellow card) 73'; Indias (yellow card) 74'	Report	Mula 8'; Nteka 42' (pen.); Diéguez (yellow card) 35'; Feuillassier (yellow card) 64'; Cristian (yellow card) 77'	Stadium: Nou Estadi Castàlia; Attendance: 0 Referee: Alejandro Muñíz Ruiz

21 February 2021 26	Girona	2–1	Castellón	Girona
18:15 CET (UTC+1)	Gumbau (yellow card) 11'; Espinosa 28'; Bárcenas 40'; Bueno (yellow card) 49'; Bustos (yellow card) 88'	Report	Mateu (yellow card) 63'; Señé 85'	Stadium: Estadi Municipal de Montilivi; Attendance: 0 Referee: Daniel Jesús Trujillo Suárez

27 February 2021 27	Castellón	4–0	Las Palmas	Castellón de la Plana
20:30 CET (UTC+1)	Moyano (yellow card) 15'; Mateu 19' (pen.); Díaz (yellow card) 32'; Fernández 58'; Jamelli 70', 81'	Report	Araujo (yellow card) 24' (yellow-red card) 27'; Curbelo (yellow card) 42'; Castellano (yellow card) 45+1'; Mújica (yellow card) 45+3'; Pejiño (yellow card) 56'; Suárez (yellow card) 87'	Stadium: Nou Estadi Castàlia; Attendance: 0 Referee: Rafael Sánchez López

6 March 2021 28	Leganés	0–0	Castellón	Leganés
18:15 CET (UTC+1)		Report		Stadium: Estadio Municipal de Butarque; Attendance: 0 Referee: Juan Luis Pulido Santana

13 March 2021 29	Castellón	2–1	Sabadell	Castellón de la Plana
18:30 CET (UTC+1)	Cornud 3' (o.g.); Señé 79'	Report	Pena 66' (pen.)	Stadium: Nou Estadi Castàlia; Attendance: 0 Referee: José Antonio López Toca

21 March 2021 30	Lugo	0–0	Castellón	Lugo
18:15 CET (UTC+1)		Report		Stadium: Anxo Carro; Attendance: 0 Referee: Miguel Ángel Ortiz Arias

26 March 2021 31	Castellón	1–3	Espanyol	Castellón de la Plana
21:00 CET (UTC+1)	Mateu 13' (pen.); Indias (yellow card) 23' (yellow-red card) 35'	Report	Dimata (yellow card) 30'; Da. López 32'; Darder 42', 49'; Calero (yellow card) 77'	Stadium: Nou Estadi Castàlia; Attendance: 0 Referee: Aitor Gorostegui Fernández-Ortega

31 March 2021 32	Albacete	0–1	Castellón	Albacete
19:00 CEST (UTC+2)	Zozulya (yellow card) 28'; Torres (yellow card) 39'	Report	Fernández 63', (yellow card) 66'	Stadium: Carlos Belmonte; Attendance: 0 Referee: Javier Iglesias Villanueva

3 April 2021 33	Castellón	1–0	Oviedo	Castellón de la Plana
18:15 CEST (UTC+2)	Arribas 67' (o.g.)	Report		Stadium: Nou Estadi Castàlia; Attendance: 0 Referee: Óliver de la Fuente Ramos

12 April 2021 34	Alcorcón	2–1	Castellón	Alcorcón
19:00 CEST (UTC+2)	Xisco 4'; Nwakali 73'	Report	Lapeña 22'	Stadium: Santo Domingo; Attendance: 0 Referee: Eduardo Prieto Iglesias

17 April 2021 35	Castellón	1–0	Mallorca	Castellón de la Plana
16:00 CEST (UTC+2)	Juanto 24'; Molina (yellow card) 26'; Lapeña (yellow card) 33'; Ledes (yellow card) 86'; García (yellow card) 90+4'	Report	Valjent (yellow card) 42'; Sevilla (yellow card) 71'; Cufré (yellow card) 78'; Raíllo (yellow card) 90+3'	Stadium: Nou Estadi Castàlia; Attendance: 0 Referee: Luis Mario Milla Alvendiz

25 April 2021 36	Tenerife	1–1	Castellón	Santa Cruz de Tenerife
20:30 CEST (UTC+2)	Sol 41'; Nono (penalty missed) 73'	Report	Díez 49'	Stadium: Heliodoro Rodríguez López; Attendance: 0 Referee: Rafael Sánchez López

2 May 2021 37	Castellón	0–0	UD Logroñés	Castellón de la Plana
18:15 CEST (UTC+2)		Report		Stadium: Nou Estadi Castàlia; Attendance: 0 Referee: David Gálvez Rascón

9 May 2021 38	Cartagena	1–0	Castellón	Cartagena
16:15 CEST (UTC+2)	Castro 55'	Report		Stadium: Cartagonova; Attendance: 0 Referee: Rubén Ávalos Barrera

15 May 2021 39	Castellón	0–2	Ponferradina	Castellón de la Plana
16:00 CEST (UTC+2)	Bodiger (yellow card) 24'; Gálvez (yellow card) 71'; Díaz (yellow card) 90+4'	Report	Sielva 45'; Valcarce 88'	Stadium: Nou Estadi Castàlia; Attendance: 0 Referee: Daniel Jesús Trujillo Suárez

20 May 2021 40	Zaragoza	3–0	Castellón	Zaragoza
21:30 CEST (UTC+2)	Serrano 13'; Azón 47'; Tejero 66' (pen.)	Report	Molina (yellow card) 53'; Cubillas (yellow card) 70'	Stadium: La Romareda; Attendance: 0 Referee: Daniel Ocón Arráiz

24 May 2021 41	Castellón	0–2	Rayo Vallecano	Castellón de la Plana
21:00 CEST (UTC+2)	Gálvez (yellow card) 39'; Indias (yellow card) 83'	Report	Comesaña (yellow card) 49'; Qasmi 49'; García 51'; Trejo (yellow card) 66'	Stadium: Nou Estadi Castàlia; Attendance: 0 Referee: Dámaso Arcediano Monescillo

30 May 2021 42	Málaga	3–0	Castellón	Málaga
21:00 CEST (UTC+2)	Quintana 42'; Šćepović 65', 86'	Report		Stadium: La Rosaleda; Attendance: 0 Referee: José Antonio López Toca

=== Copa del Rey ===
16 December 2020 First round	San Fernando	0–2	Castellón	San Fernando
18:00 CET (UTC+1)		Report	Fernandes 35'; Muñoz 37'	Stadium: Iberoamericano; Referee: Dámaso Arcediano Monescillo

6 January 2021 Second round	Castellón	0–2	Tenerife	Castellón de la Plana
20:00 CET (UTC+1)	Ortuño (yellow card) 40'; García (penalty missed) 79'	Report	Vada 4', (yellow card) 32'; Ruiz 45'; Sanz (yellow card) 78'; Jiménez (yellow card) 82'; Bermejo (yellow card) 85'	Stadium: Castàlia; Referee: Alejandro Muñiz Ruiz
