= 2020 Segunda División B play-offs =

Spanish second division football matches

The 2020 Segunda División B play-offs (Playoffs de Ascenso or Promoción de Ascenso) are the final play-offs for promotion from 2019–20 Segunda División B to the 2020–21 Segunda División. The four first placed teams in each one of the four qualify for the promotion play-offs. Due to the COVID-19 pandemic, the relegation play-off was cancelled.

Play-offs were played on 18 and 19 July as single-legged matches at a neutral venue.

== Venues ==
On 9 June 2020, the Royal Spanish Football Federation announced that the play-offs are to be played in three locations of Andalusia.

Location	Stadium	Capacity
Algeciras	Nuevo Mirador	7,200
Málaga	Ciudad de Málaga	10,816
Málaga	La Rosaleda	30,044
Marbella	Antonio Lorenzo Cuevas	7,300
Marbella	Marbella Fútbol Center	

== Format ==
The four group winners had the opportunity to promote directly. They were drawn into a single game series where the two winners were promoted to the Segunda División. For this year, the final which normally took place between the two winners to decide the overall champion of Segunda B was removed. The two losing semi-finalists entered the play-off round for the last two promotion spots.

The four group runners-up were drawn against one of the three fourth-placed teams outside their group while the four third-placed teams were drawn against each other in a single game series. The six winners advanced with the two losing semi-finalists to determine the four teams that play for the last two promotion spots.

As the regular season was suspended due to the COVID-19 pandemic, the qualified teams were chosen according to the position after the last round played before the suspension.

The draw of the first stage was held on 25 June.

== Group winners promotion play-offs ==
=== Qualified teams ===
Group	Team
1	Atlético Baleares
2	UD Logroñés
3	Castellón
4	FC Cartagena

=== Matches ===
Team 1	Score	Team 2
Castellón	1–1 (2–3 p)	UD Logroñés
FC Cartagena	0–0 (4–3 p)	Atlético Baleares

18 July 2020	Castellón	1–1 (a.e.t.) (2–3 p)	UD Logroñés	Málaga
22:00 (CEST)				Stadium: La Rosaleda
	Penalties
	Muguruza (penalty scored); Muñoz (penalty scored); Díez (penalty missed); Gálvez (penalty missed); Díaz (penalty missed)		Pérez (penalty scored); Sáenz (penalty scored); Andy (penalty scored); Petcoff (penalty missed)

19 July 2020	FC Cartagena	0–0 (a.e.t.) (4–3 p)	Atlético Baleares	Málaga
22:00 (CEST)				Stadium: La Rosaleda
	Penalties
	Verza (penalty scored); Elady (penalty scored); Lucas (penalty scored); Caballero (penalty scored)		Lekić (penalty scored); Peris (penalty scored); Gil (penalty scored); Samuel (penalty missed); Ortiz (penalty missed)

Promoted to Segunda División
FC Cartagena (8 years later)	UD Logroñés (First time ever)

== Non-group winners promotion play-offs ==
=== First round ===
==== Qualified teams ====
Group	Position	Team
1	2nd	Ibiza
2	2nd	Cultural Leonesa
3	2nd	Barcelona B
4	2nd	Marbella

Group	Position	Team
1	3rd	Atlético Madrid B
2	3rd	Athletic Bilbao B
3	3rd	Sabadell
4	3rd	Badajoz

Group	Position	Team
1	4th	Peña Deportiva
2	4th	Valladolid Promesas
3	4th	Cornellà
4	4th	Yeclano

==== Matches ====
Team 1	Score	Team 2
Ibiza	1–2	Cornellà
Athletic Bilbao B	1–1 (5–6 p)	Badajoz
Marbella	0–2	Peña Deportiva
Barcelona B	3–2	Valladolid Promesas
Sabadell	1–1 (3–1 p)	Atlético Madrid B
Cultural Leonesa	4–1	Yeclano

18 July 2020	Ibiza	1–2	Cornellà	Málaga
20:00 (CEST)	Rodado 63'		Becerra 13'; Pablo 17'	Stadium: Ciudad de Málaga

18 July 2020	Athletic Bilbao B	1–1 (5–6 p)	Badajoz	Algeciras
20:00 (CEST)	Luengo 18'		Vázquez 27'	Stadium: Nuevo Mirador
	Penalties
	Sancet (penalty missed); Vencedor (penalty scored); García (penalty scored); Guruzeta (penalty scored); Morcillo (penalty scored); Sillero (penalty scored); San Bartolomé (penalty missed)		(penalty scored) Pina; (penalty missed) Ramos; (penalty scored) Concha; (penalty scored) Morgado; (penalty scored) Santamaría; (penalty scored) Vázquez; (penalty scored) Maestre

18 July 2020	Marbella	0–2	Peña Deportiva	Marbella
22:00 (CEST)			Núñez 2'; Higor 55'	Stadium: Marbella Football Center

19 July 2020	Barcelona B	3–2	Valladolid Promesas	Málaga
20:00 (CEST)	de la Fuente 3', 83'; Monchu 57'	Report	Miguel 8', 90'	Stadium: Ciudad de Málaga

19 July 2020	Sabadell	1–1 (a.e.t.) (3–1 p)	Atlético Madrid B	Algeciras
20:00 (CEST)	Édgar 4'		Álvaro 90+3'	Stadium: Nuevo Mirador
	Penalties
	Lanzarote (penalty scored); Martínez (penalty missed); Grego (penalty missed); Boris (penalty scored); Pena (penalty scored)		(penalty missed) Moya; (penalty scored) Tropi; (penalty missed) Cedric; (penalty missed) Abde

19 July 2020	Cultural Leonesa	4–1	Yeclano	Marbella
22:00 (CEST)	Pichín 24'; Héctor 49' (pen.); Dioni 52', 79'		Mario 28'	Stadium: Marbella Football Center

=== Second round ===
==== Qualified teams ====
Group	Position	Team
1	1st	Atlético Baleares
3	1st	Castellón

Group	Position	Team
2	2nd	Cultural Leonesa
3	2nd	Barcelona B

Group	Position	Team
3	3rd	Sabadell
4	3rd	Badajoz

Group	Position	Team
1	4th	Peña Deportiva
3	4th	Cornellà

==== Matches ====
Team 1	Score	Team 2
Castellón	1–0 (a.e.t.)	Peña Deportiva
Atlético Baleares	0–1	Cornellà
Barcelona B	1–1 (5–3 p)	Badajoz
Cultural Leonesa	2–2 (6–7 p)	Sabadell

23 July 2020	Atlético Baleares	0–1	Cornellà	Marbella
20:00 (CEST)			Medina 81'	Stadium: Antonio Lorenzo Cuevas

23 July 2020	Barcelona B	1–1 (a.e.t.) (5–3 p)	Badajoz	Algeciras
20:00 (CEST)	Manaj 82'		Guzmán 39'	Stadium: Nuevo Mirador
	Penalties
	Akieme (penalty scored); Araújo (penalty scored); Cuenca (penalty scored); Manaj (penalty scored); Monchu (penalty scored)		Morgado (penalty missed); Isma (penalty scored); Concha (penalty scored); Corredera (penalty scored)

23 July 2020	Castellón	1–0 (a.e.t.)	Peña Deportiva	Málaga
22:00 (CEST)	Cubillas 111'			Stadium: La Rosaleda

23 July 2020	Cultural Leonesa	2–2 (a.e.t.) (6–7 p)	Sabadell	Málaga
22:00 (CEST)	Hernández 62'; Menudo 86'		Querol 13'; Rubio 90+2'	Stadium: Ciudad de Málaga

=== Third round ===
==== Qualified teams ====
Group	Position	Team
3	1st	Castellón

Group	Position	Team
3	2nd	Barcelona B

Group	Position	Team
3	3rd	Sabadell

Group	Position	Team
3	4th	Cornellà

==== Matches ====
Team 1	Score	Team 2
Castellón	1–0	Cornellà
Barcelona B	1–2	Sabadell

26 July 2020	Barcelona B	1–2	Sabadell	Marbella
20:00 (CEST)	Monchu 37'		Coch 47'; Querol 74'	Stadium: Antonio Lorenzo Cuevas

26 July 2020	Castellón	1–0	Cornellà	Málaga
22:00 (CEST)	Juanto 27'			Stadium: La Rosaleda

Promoted to Segunda División
Castellón (10 years later)	Sabadell (5 years later)
