= List of Spanish football transfers winter 2020–21 =

This is a list of Spanish football transfers for the winter sale in La Liga and the Segunda División.

The Spanish winter transfer window opened on 2 January 2021, although a few transfers were announced prior to that date. The window closed at midnight on 31 January 2021. Players without a club can join one at any time, either during or in between transfer windows. Clubs below La Liga level can also sign players on loan at any time. If need be, clubs can sign a goalkeeper on an emergency loan, if all others are unavailable.

== Winter 2020–21 La Liga transfer window ==
Date	Name	Moving from	Moving to	Fee
10 December 2020	(Spain) Cristo González	(Italy) Udinese	Mirandés	Loan
21 December 2020	(Spain) José Martínez	Eibar	(United States) FC Dallas	Undisclosed
24 December 2020	(Georgia (country)) Giorgi Papunashvili	Zaragoza	(Cyprus) Apollon Limassol	Undisclosed
28 December 2020	(Venezuela) Alexander González	(Romania) Dinamo București	Málaga	Undisclosed
30 December 2020	(France) Étienne Capoue	(England) Watford	Villarreal	Undisclosed
30 December 2020	(Spain) Borja Valle	(Romania) Dinamo București	Real Oviedo	Undisclosed
31 December 2020	(Portugal) Ivanildo Fernandes	(Portugal) Sporting CP B	Almería	Loan
31 December 2020	(Spain) Aarón Martín	(Germany) Mainz 05	Celta Vigo	Loan
1 January 2021	(Spain) Tana	Unattached	Albacete	Free
6 January 2021	(Spain) Carles Aleñá	Barcelona	Getafe	Loan
8 January 2021	(Japan) Takefusa Kubo	Real Madrid	Getafe	Loan
10 January 2021	(Croatia) Toni Datković	(Greece) Aris	Cartagena	Loan
11 January 2021	(Spain) Manu Sánchez	Atlético Madrid	Osasuna	Loan
12 January 2021	(Spain) Sergio González	Cádiz	Tenerife	Loan
12 January 2021	(Spain) Álvaro Vázquez	Sporting Gijón	Sadabell	Loan
13 January 2021	(France) Moussa Dembélé	(France) Lyon	Atlético Madrid	Loan
14 January 2021	(Spain) Antoñito	(Greece) Panathinaikos	Cartagena	Free
14 January 2021	(Serbia) Luka Jović	Real Madrid	(Germany) Eintracht Frankfurt	Loan
14 January 2021	(Brazil) William	Leganés	Valencia B	Loan
15 January 2021	(Argentina) Pablo de Blasis	Unattached	Cartagena	Free
15 January 2021	(Spain) Borja Garcés	Atlético Madrid	Fuenlabrada	Loan
15 January 2021	(Colombia) Johan Mojica	Girona	Elche	Loan
15 January 2021	(France) Mathieu Peybernes	Almería	Zaragoza	Loan
16 January 2021	(Peru) Jean-Pierre Rhyner	Cádiz	(Netherlands) Emmen	Loan
17 January 2021	(Argentina) Leandro Chichizola	Getafe	Cartagena	Free
17 January 2021	(Mauritania) Bakary N'Diaye	Unattached	Lugo	Free
17 January 2021	(Spain) Roberto Olabe	Eibar	(Portugal) Tondela	Loan
18 January 2021	(Spain) Aleix García	(Romania) Dinamo București	Eibar	Free
18 January 2021	(Spain) José Aurelio Suárez	Girona	Gimnàstic	Free
19 January 2021	(Spain) Álex Alegría	Mallorca	Zaragoza	Loan
19 January 2021	(Spain) Brandon	Osasuna	Leganés	Loan
19 January 2021	(Poland) Damian Kądzior	Eibar	(Turkey) Alanyaspor	Loan
19 January 2021	(Spain) Dani Ojeda	Leganés	Alcorcón	Free
20 January 2021	(Spain) Alejandro Marcos	Castellón	Llagostera	Loan
22 January 2021	(Spain) Sergio Aguza	Almería	Ponferradina	Loan
22 January 2021	(Spain) Liberto Beltrán	Albacete	UCAM Murcia	Loan
22 January 2021	(Spain) David del Pozo	Albacete	Las Rozas	Loan
22 January 2021	(Spain) Javi Moyano	Real Valladolid	Castellón	Free
22 January 2021	(Spain) Riki	Real Oviedo	Racing	Loan
22 January 2021	(Serbia) Ivan Šaponjić	Atlético Madrid	Cádiz	Loan
23 January 2021	(Brazil) Willian José	Real Sociedad	(England) Wolverhampton Wanderers	Loan
23 January 2021	(Spain) Álex López	Espanyol	Mirandés	Free
23 January 2021	(Argentina) Augusto Solari	(Argentina) Racing Club	Celta Vigo	Undisclosed
24 January 2021	(Spain) Carlos Fernández	Sevilla	Real Sociedad	€10m
26 January 2021	(Equatorial Guinea) Federico Bikoro	Zaragoza	Badalona	Loan
26 January 2021	(Spain) Jesús Carrillo	Castellón	Real Murcia	Loan
26 January 2021	(Argentina) Papu Gómez	(Italy) Atalanta	Sevilla	Undisclosed
26 January 2021	(Spain) Raúl Navas	Osasuna	Cartagena	Free
26 January 2021	(Uruguay) Juan Manuel Sanabria	Atlético Madrid	Zaragoza	Loan
27 January 2021	(France) Fadiga Ouattara	(France) Lille	Valencia	Loan
27 January 2021	(Norway) Martin Ødegaard	Real Madrid	(England) Arsenal	Loan
28 January 2021	(Georgia (country)) Giorgi Aburjania	Real Oviedo	Cartagena	Free
28 January 2021	(Equatorial Guinea) Jannick Buyla	Zaragoza	UCAM Murcia	Loan
28 January 2021	(Bosnia and Herzegovina) Kenan Kodro	Athletic Bilbao	Real Valladolid	Loan
28 January 2021	(Switzerland) Neftali Manzambi	Sporting Gijón	(Sweden) Mjällby	Loan
29 January 2021	(Guinea-Bissau) Carlos Embaló	(Belgium) Eupen	Alcorcón	Loan
29 January 2021	(Spain) Jordi Sánchez	Castellón	UCAM Murcia	Loan
30 January 2021	(Morocco) Sofian Chakla	Villarreal	Getafe	Loan
31 January 2021	(Italy) Patrick Cutrone	(England) Wolverhampton Wanderers	Valencia	Loan
31 January 2021	(Portugal) Ferro	(Portugal) Benfica	Valencia	Loan
31 January 2021	(Spain) Álvaro Giménez	Cádiz	Mallorca	Loan
31 January 2021	(Spain) Álex Martín	Cartagena	Cádiz	Undisclosed
31 January 2021	(Spain) Nano Mesa	Cádiz	Logroñés	Loan
31 January 2021	(Nigeria) Kelechi Nwakali	Huesca	Alcorcón	Loan
31 January 2021	(Uruguay) Facundo Pellistri	(England) Manchester United	Alavés	Loan
31 January 2021	(Paraguay) Antonio Sanabria	Real Betis	(Italy) Torino	Undisclosed
31 January 2021	(Mali) Moussa Sidibé	Ponferradina	Córdoba	Loan
31 January 2021	(Spain) Rubén Sobrino	Valencia	Cádiz	Loan
1 February 2021	(England) Arvin Appiah	Almería	Lugo	Loan
1 February 2021	(Spain) Nahuel Arroyo	Albacete	Córdoba	Undisclosed
1 February 2021	(France) Karim Azamoum	Albacete	(France) Troyes	Undisclosed
1 February 2021	(Nigeria) Ramon Azeez	Granada	Cartagena	Loan
1 February 2021	(France) Yann Bodiger	Cádiz	Castellón	Free
1 February 2021	(Spain) Víctor Campuzano	Espanyol	Sporting Gijón	Free
1 February 2021	(Spain) Chema	Alabacete	Real Betis B	Loan
1 February 2021	(Spain) Iñigo Córdoba	Athletic Bilbao	Alavés	Loan
1 February 2021	(Democratic Republic of the Congo) Landry Dimata	(Belgium) Anderlecht	Espanyol	Loan
1 February 2021	(Spain) Javier Espinosa	Unattached	Fuenlabrada	Free
1 February 2021	(Argentina) Facundo Ferreyra	(Portugal) Benfica	Celta Vigo	Free
1 February 2021	(Spain) Álvaro Fidalgo	Castellón	(Mexico) Club América	Loan
1 February 2021	(Argentina) Paulo Gazzaniga	(England) Tottenham Hotspur	Elche	Loan
1 February 2021	(Spain) Miguel Ángel Guerrero	(England) Nottingham Forest	Rayo Vallecano	Undisclosed
1 February 2021	(Scotland) Jack Harper	Getafe	Villarreal B	Loan
1 February 2021	(Morocco) Oussama Idrissi	Sevilla	(Netherlands) Ajax	Loan
1 February 2021	(Spain) Guillem Jaime	Castellón	Gimnàstic	Loan
1 February 2021	(Spain) Jesé	Unattached	Las Palmas	Free
1 February 2021	(Spain) Álvaro Juan	Alcorcón	Cultural Deportiva	Loan
1 February 2021	(Spain) Ale Llamas	Alcorcón	Cultural Deportiva	Loan
1 February 2021	(Spain) Cristian López	(Greece) Aris Thessaloniki	Cartagena	Loan
1 February 2021	(Spain) Adrián Marín	Alavés	Granada	Undisclosed
1 February 2021	(Spain) Víctor Mollejo	Atlético Madrid	Mallorca	Loan
1 February 2021	(Spain) Simón Moreno	Villarreal B	Mirandés	Loan
1 February 2021	(Spain) Rafa Mújica	(England) Leeds United	Las Palmas	Loan
1 February 2021	(Uruguay) Lucas Olaza	(Argentina) Boca Juniors	Real Valladolid	Loan
1 February 2021	(Uruguay) Christian Oliva	(Italy) Cagliari	Valencia	Loan
1 February 2021	(Spain) Adrián Ortolá	Tenerife	Girona	Undisclosed
1 February 2021	(Spain) Dani Pacheco	Unattached	Logroñés	Free
1 February 2021	(Portugal) Domingos Quina	(England) Watford	Granada	Loan
1 February 2021	(Angola) Jonás Ramalho	Girona	Osasuna	Loan
1 February 2021	(Uruguay) Brian Rodríguez	(United States) Los Angeles	Almería	Loan
1 February 2021	(Brazil) Guilherme Schettine	(Portugal) Braga	Almería	Loan
1 February 2021	(Spain) Jon Ander Serantes	(Japan) Avispa Fukuoka	Tenerife	Undisclosed
1 February 2021	(Spain) Cedric Teguia	Atlético Madrid B	Alabacete	Loan
1 February 2021	(France) Jean-Clair Todibo	Barcelona	(France) Nice	Loan
1 February 2021	(Spain) Germán Valera	Atlético Madrid	Tenerife	Loan
1 February 2021	(Netherlands) Rajiv van La Parra	Logroñés	(Germany) Würzburger Kickers	Free
1 February 2021	(Slovakia) Denis Vavro	(Italy) Lazio	Huesca	Loan
1 February 2021	(Spain) Koke Vegas	Levante	Mallorca	Loan
1 February 2021	(Spain) Xisco	Unattached	Alcorcón	Free
1 February 2021	(Turkey) Okay Yokuşlu	Celta Vigo	(England) West Bromwich Albion	Loan
2 February 2021	(Spain) Moi	Real Valladolid	Ponferradina	Loan
