= Juan Antonio Anquela =

Spanish football manager (born 1957)

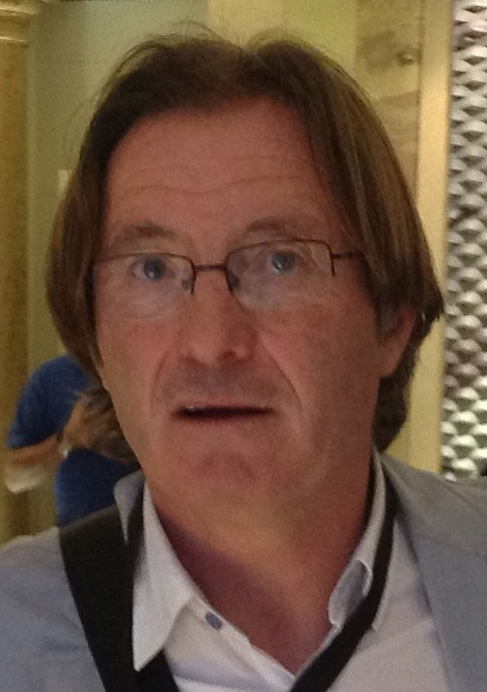
- Anquela in 2012

Personal information
- Full name: Juan Antonio Albacete Anquela
- Date of birth: 11 September 1957 (age 69)
- Place of birth: Linares, Spain
- Height: 1.70 m (5 ft 7 in)
- Position: Winger

Youth career
- Jaén

Senior career*
Years	Team	Apps	(Gls)
1975–1983	Jaén	109	(34)
1975–1977	→ Torredonjimeno (loan)		
1977–1978	→ Úbeda (loan)	31	(8)
1978–1979	→ Paterna (loan)	18	(1)
1983–1986	Elche	77	(15)
1986–1987	Albacete	26	(2)
1987–1988	Linares	33	(21)
1988–1990	Córdoba	60	(9)
1990–1991	Iliturgi		
1991–1992	Jaén	27	(1)
Total		381	(91)

Managerial career
- 1997: Jaén
- 2000: Jaén
- 2001–2002: Jaén
- 2002–2003: Jaén
- 2005: Huesca
- 2005–2006: Melilla
- 2007: Águilas
- 2008–2012: Alcorcón
- 2012–2013: Granada
- 2013–2015: Numancia
- 2015–2017: Huesca
- 2017–2019: Oviedo
- 2019: Deportivo La Coruña
- 2020–2021: Alcorcón
- 2022: Ibiza
- * Club domestic league appearances and goals

Juan Antonio Albacete Anquela (born 11 September 1957) is a Spanish football manager and former player who played as a winger.

== Playing career ==
Born in Linares, Jaén, Anquela spent the better part of his 17-year senior career in the lower leagues, beginning and finishing with local Real Jaén. His professional output consisted of four seasons with Elche, which he helped promote to La Liga in 1984 by scoring ten goals in 34 matches.

Anquela's debut in the Spanish top division took place on 1 September 1984, when he came as a second-half substitute in a 0–1 home loss to Valencia. He scored the first of his three goals in the competition on 21 November in the 1–1 home draw against Málaga, but the Valencians were eventually relegated after finishing in 17th place.

== Coaching career ==
Anquela started working as a coach with Jaén, acting as assistant. During the 1997–98 and 2001–02 campaigns, he was in charge of the first team for a total of 13 games, both times being relegated from Segunda División.

For the better part of the next eight years, Anquela worked in the Segunda División B with Jaén, Huesca, Melilla, Águilas and Alcorcón. With the latter, he ousted Real Madrid from the 2009–10 edition of the Copa del Rey, with the first leg ending with a 4–0 shock win; he also led the team to promotion to the second tier in the same season, which happened to the club for the first time ever.

After two further years with Alcorcón in that league, leading the side to the 2012 promotion playoffs but falling short against Real Valladolid, Anquela moved to the top flight with Granada, thus returning to his native Andalusia. He was dismissed on 30 January 2013, after only seven months in charge.

On 11 June 2013, Anquela was appointed at Numancia, agreeing to a one-year contract with the division two club. On 30 November 2015, he returned to Huesca, replacing the fired Luis Tevenet.

Anquela left the club on 20 June 2017 after missing out promotion in the play-offs, and was named manager of Real Oviedo three days later. On 22 April 2019, he was relieved of his duties.

On 2 July 2019, Anquela was announced as the new coach of Deportivo de La Coruña, being dismissed on 7 October after just one win in ten league matches. He returned to Alcorcón after eight years on 9 November 2020, taking over from the sacked Mere.

Anquela narrowly avoided relegation in 2020–21, and was eventually dismissed on 18 September 2021 as they stood bottom of the table. On 24 October of the following year, he signed with fellow second-tier Ibiza, but was sacked within a month at the club.

== Managerial statistics ==
As of 20 November 2022

Managerial record by team and tenure
Team	Nat	From	To	Record								Ref
Team	Nat	From	To	G	W	D	L	GF	GA	GD	Win %	Ref
Jaén	(Spain)	27 October 1997	3 November 1997	2	0	2	0	2	2	+0	0.00	
Jaén	(Spain)	3 April 2000	17 April 2000	2	1	0	1	2	2	+0	50.00	
Jaén	(Spain)	23 December 2001	18 March 2002	12	2	4	6	4	12	−8	16.67	
Jaén	(Spain)	1 July 2002	27 January 2003	22	4	9	9	22	27	−5	18.18	
Huesca	(Spain)	17 February 2005	30 June 2005	15	6	6	3	17	13	+4	40.00	
Melilla	(Spain)	1 July 2005	30 June 2006	38	14	8	16	37	44	−7	36.84	
Águilas	(Spain)	18 February 2007	30 June 2007	14	8	1	5	20	14	+6	57.14	
Alcorcón	(Spain)	24 February 2008	18 June 2012	204	94	58	52	284	201	+83	46.08	
Granada	(Spain)	18 June 2012	30 January 2013	23	6	5	12	20	34	−14	26.09	
Numancia	(Spain)	11 June 2013	12 June 2015	87	23	39	25	97	100	−3	26.44	
Huesca	(Spain)	30 November 2015	20 June 2017	76	29	23	24	98	89	+9	38.16	
Oviedo	(Spain)	23 June 2017	22 April 2019	79	32	22	25	94	88	+6	40.51	
Deportivo La Coruña	(Spain)	2 July 2019	7 October 2019	10	1	5	4	11	17	−6	10.00	
Alcorcón	(Spain)	9 November 2020	18 September 2021	41	15	8	18	37	43	−6	36.59	
Ibiza	(Spain)	24 October 2022	23 November 2022	5	1	1	3	3	6	−3	20.00	
Total				630	236	191	203	748	692	+56	37.46	—
