= Sergi Escobar =

Sergi Escobar may refer to:

- Sergi Escobar (cyclist) (born 1974), Spanish cyclist
- Sergi Escobar (football manager) (born 1975), Spanish football manager
