= Muguruza =

Muguruza is a Basque surname. Notable people with the surname include:

- Fermin Muguruza (born 1963), Spanish rock musician, singer, songwriter, producer, and record label manager
- Garbiñe Muguruza (born 1993), Spanish-Venezuelan tennis player
- Joseba Muguruza (born 1994), Spanish footballer
- Josu Muguruza (1958–1989), Basque-origin Spanish journalist and politician
- Pedro Muguruza (1893–1952), Spanish architect and Francoist politician
