= Aarón Romero =

Spanish association football player (born 1999)

Personal information
- Full name: Aarón Romero Catalán
- Date of birth: 15 June 1999 (age 27)
- Place of birth: Castellón de la Plana, Spain
- Height: 1.78 m (5 ft 10 in)
- Position: Left-back

Team information
- Current team: Chaves
- Number: 3

Youth career
- Castellón
- Rafalafena
- Castellón

Senior career*
Years	Team	Apps	(Gls)
2018–2021	Castellón B	82	(11)
2020–2023	Castellón	21	(1)
2023–2024	Almería B	50	(4)
2024–	Chaves	39	(1)
- * Club domestic league appearances and goals as of 20 June 2026

Aarón Romero Catalán (born 15 June 1999) is a Spanish professional footballer who plays as a left-back for Liga Portugal 2 club Chaves.

== Club career ==
Romero was born in Castellón de la Plana, Valencian Community, and represented CD Castellón and CF Rafalafena as a youth. He made his senior debut with the reserves on 20 May 2018, starting in a 4–0 Regional Preferente Valenciana away win against CF Sant Jordí.

Romero scored his first senior goal on 9 December 2018, netting his team's second in a 2–0 away win against CF Borriol. He made his first team debut on 16 December 2020, coming on as a late substitute for Jesús Carrillo in a 2–0 win at CD San Fernando, for the season's Copa del Rey.

Romero made his Segunda División debut on 30 May 2021, replacing Carlos Delgado in a 0–3 away loss against Málaga CF, as his side was already relegated. On 31 January 2023, he moved to UD Almería B in Tercera Federación.

On 2 July 2024, Romero moved to Portugal, joining Liga Portugal 2 club Chaves.
