= Igor Zlatanović =

Serbian footballer

Igor Zlatanović Игор Златановић
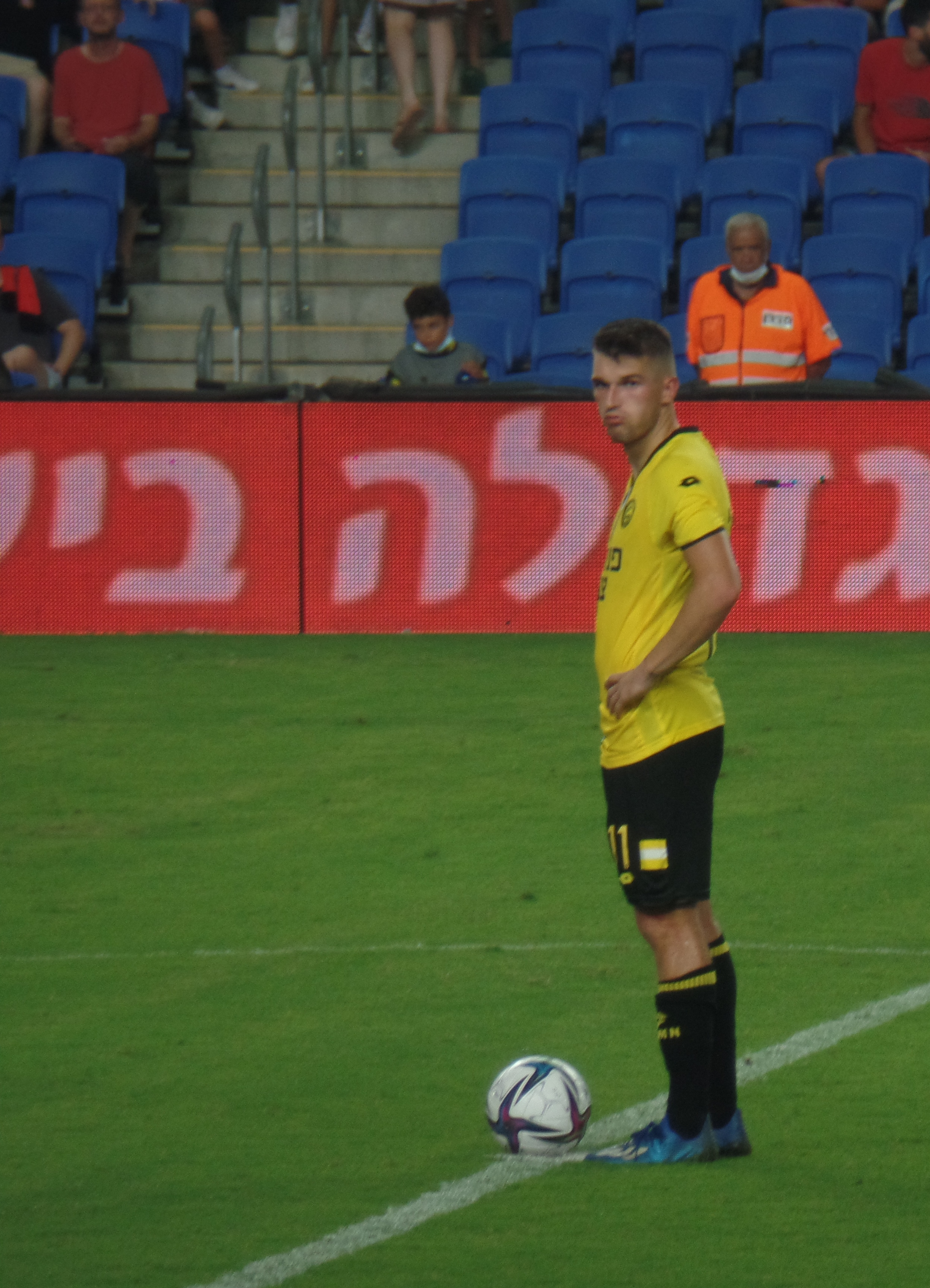

Personal information
- Date of birth: 10 February 1998 (age 28)
- Place of birth: Užice, FR Yugoslavia
- Height: 1.80 m (5 ft 11 in)
- Position: Centre-forward

Team information
- Current team: Hapoel Be'er Sheva
- Number: 66

Youth career
- Partizan

Senior career*
Years	Team	Apps	(Gls)
2015–2016	Partizan	0	(0)
2015–2016	→ Teleoptik (loan)	23	(9)
2016–2019	Radnik Surdulica	97	(29)
2019–2021	Mallorca	0	(0)
2019–2020	→ Numancia (loan)	15	(2)
2020–2021	→ Castellón (loan)	25	(3)
2021–2025	Maccabi Netanya	115	(45)
2025–	Hapoel Be'er Sheva	38	(19)

International career^{‡}
2014	Serbia U17	3	(0)
2016–2017	Serbia U19	6	(1)
2017–2019	Serbia U21	11	(1)
- * Club domestic league appearances and goals as of 04:08, 7 November 2026 (UTC) ‡ National team caps and goals as of 00:35, 20 October 2026 (UTC)

Igor Zlatanović (Serbian Cyrillic: Игор Златановић; born 10 February 1998) is a Serbian professional footballer who plays as a centre-forward for Israeli Premier League club Hapoel Be'er Sheva.

== Club career ==
Born in Užice, Zlatanović passed FK Partizan youth categories. In summer 2015, he was loaned to Serbian League Belgrade side Teleoptik, where he scored 9 goals on 23 matches for the 2015–16 season. In summer 2016, he signed with Radnik Surdulica.

On 31 July 2019, Zlatanović moved abroad and signed a four-year deal with La Liga newcomers RCD Mallorca, but was loaned to Segunda División side CD Numancia on 16 August. On 18 September of the following year, he moved to fellow second division side CD Castellón also in a temporary deal.

== International career ==
Zlatanović was a member of Serbia U16 and Serbia U17 national football teams between 2013 and 2014. He also played for U18 selection from 2015 to 2016 and scored 4 goals including 2 he scored in second half of match against Armenia in March 2016. In August 2016, Zlatanović was called into Serbia U19 squad for memorial tournament "Stevan Vilotić - Ćele", where he scored a goal in opening match against the United States. He also scored 2 goals in the final match of the tournament, against Israel.

== Career statistics ==
=== Club ===
As of match played 10 January 2026

Appearances and goals by club, season and competition
Club	Season	League			National cup (Note: Includes Serbian Cup, Copa del Rey, Israel State Cup)		League cup (Note: Includes Toto Cup)		Continental		Other		Total	
Club	Season	Division	Apps	Goals	Apps	Goals	Apps	Goals	Apps	Goals	Apps	Goals	Apps	Goals
Teleoptik (loan)	2015–16	Serbian League Belgrade	23	9	0	0	—		—		—		23	9
Radnik Surdulica	2016–17	Serbian SuperLiga	27	2	2	0	—		—		—		29	2
Radnik Surdulica	2017–18	Serbian SuperLiga	33	13	0	0	—		—		—		33	13
Radnik Surdulica	2018–19	Serbian SuperLiga	35	13	3	2	—		—		—		38	15
Radnik Surdulica	2019–20	Serbian SuperLiga	2	1	0	0	—		—		—		2	1
Radnik Surdulica	Total		97	29	5	2	—		—		—		102	31
Numancia (loan)	2019–20	Segunda Divisíon	15	2	1	0	—		—		—		16	2
Castellón (loan)	2020–21	Segunda Divisíon	25	3	0	0	—		—		—		25	3
Maccabi Netanya	2021–22	Israeli Premier League	35	12	2	0	5	4	—		—		42	16
Maccabi Netanya	2022–23	Israeli Premier League	34	15	4	0	2	0	1 (Note: Appearance in UEFA Europa Conference League)	0	—		41	15
Maccabi Netanya	2023–24	Israeli Premier League	23	5	3	0	4	0	—		—		30	5
Maccabi Netanya	2024–25	Israeli Premier League	23	13	2	0	5	4	—		—		30	17
Maccabi Netanya	Total		115	45	11	0	16	8	1	0	—		143	53
Hapoel Be'er Sheva	2025–26	Israeli Premier League	17	7	0	0	0	0	4 (Note: Two appearances in UEFA Europa League, two appearances in UEFA Conference League)	0	1 (Note: Appearance in Israel Super Cup)	0	22	7
Career total			292	95	17	2	16	8	5	0	1	0	331	105

== Honours ==
Maccabi Netanya

- Toto Cup: 2022–23

Hapoel Beer Sheva

- Israeli Premier League: 2025–26
- Israel Super Cup: 2025
