= Koke (footballer, born 2000) =

Spanish association football player

Personal information
- Full name: Jorge Saiz Colomer
- Date of birth: 11 September 2000 (age 26)
- Place of birth: Moncada, Spain
- Position: Winger

Team information
- Current team: Bergantiños
- Number: 11

Youth career
- Valencia
- 2017–2019: Torre Levante

Senior career*
Years	Team	Apps	(Gls)
2019	Torre Levante	3	(0)
2019–2022	Castellón B		
2021–2022	Castellón	19	(0)
2022–2023	Alcoyano	19	(1)
2023–2024	Torrent	4	(0)
2024–2025	Alzira	37	(1)
2025–	Bergantiños	1	(0)
- * Club domestic league appearances and goals as of 27 September 2025

Jorge Saiz Colomer (born 11 September 2000), commonly known as Koke, is a Spanish footballer who plays as a left winger for Segunda Federación club Bergantiños.

== Career ==
Born in Moncada, Valencian Community, Koke started his career at Valencia CF's youth setup before moving to CF Torre Levante in 2017. He made his senior debut with the latter on 4 May 2019, coming on as a second-half substitute in a 2–1 Tercera División home win against UD Rayo Ibense.

On 29 July 2019, Koke moved to CD Castellón and was assigned to the reserves in the regional leagues. He made his first-team debut on 30 May 2021, starting in a 3–0 away loss against Málaga CF in the Segunda División, as his side was already relegated.
