= Carles Salvador =

Spanish footballer

Personal information
- Full name: Carles Salvador Vidal
- Date of birth: 17 September 1990 (age 36)
- Place of birth: Castellón de la Plana, Spain
- Height: 1.74 m (5 ft 9 in)
- Position: Midfielder

Youth career
- Castellón
- 2007–2009: Valencia

Senior career*
| Years | Team | Apps | (Gls) |
| 2009–2012 | Valencia B | 49 | (4) |
| 2009–2010 | → Catarroja (loan) | 19 | (1) |
| 2012–2013 | Olímpic Xàtiva | 35 | (3) |
| 2013–2016 | Alcoyano | 95 | (5) |
| 2016–2019 | Logroñés | 102 | (6) |
| 2019–2024 | Castellón | 97 | (0) |
| 2023 | → Saguntino (loan) | 16 | (1) |
| 2023–2024 | → Sabadell (loan) | 15 | (0) |

Managerial career
- 2024–: Castellón (youth)
- 2025: Castellón B (caretaker)
- * Club domestic league appearances and goals as of 30 June 2024

Carles Salvador Vidal (born 17 September 1990) is a Spanish retired footballer who played as a central midfielder.

== Playing career ==
Salvador was born in Castellón de la Plana, Valencian Community, and joined Valencia CF's youth setup in 2007, from CD Castellón. In 2009, after finishing his formation, he was immediately loaned to Tercera División side Catarroja CF for the season.

Salvador returned to the Che in 2010, being assigned to the reserves also in the fourth division. In August 2012, he signed for Segunda División B side CD Olímpic de Xàtiva.

Salvador continued to appear in the third division in the following years, representing CD Alcoyano, UD Logroñés and Castellón. With the latter side he achieved promotion to Segunda División in 2020, contributing with 31 appearances (play-offs included).

On 12 September 2020, Salvador made his professional debut at the age of 30, starting in a 2–1 away win against SD Ponferradina. After suffering immediate relegation, he saw his playing time gradually decrease and, after loans to Atlético Saguntino and CE Sabadell FC, he retired in 2024 at the age of 33.

== Managerial career ==
In August 2024, Salvador returned to Castellón as a coordinator of the club's 8-a-side-football categories. In December, however, he was named manager of the Cadete B squad, while also acting as an assistant of the Juvenil A team.

On 17 September 2025, Salvador was appointed caretaker manager of the Orellut's B-team in Segunda Federación, after Pablo Hernández moved to the first team under the same capacity. On 26 December, Salvador was moved into the club structure at Castellón and Óscar López replaced him as manager of CD Castellón B.
