= Arturo Molina (footballer) =

Spanish footballer

Personal information
- Full name: Arturo Molina Tornero
- Date of birth: 18 July 1996 (age 30)
- Place of birth: Abarán, Spain
- Height: 1.83 m (6 ft 0 in)
- Position: Midfielder

Team information
- Current team: Ponferradina
- Number: 14

Youth career
- Murcia

Senior career*
Years	Team	Apps	(Gls)
2014	Murcia B	7	(1)
2014–2017	Murcia	59	(8)
2016–2017	→ Levante B (loan)	25	(7)
2017–2020	Levante B	58	(8)
2017–2018	→ Real Madrid B (loan)	21	(1)
2020–2021	Levante	0	(0)
2020–2021	→ Castellón (loan)	24	(0)
2021–2022	Fuenlabrada	12	(0)
2022–2023	Racing Santander	37	(2)
2023–2024	Murcia	13	(0)
2024–2025	Ibiza	23	(0)
2025–	Talavera de la Reina	30	(4)
- Ponferradina
- * Club domestic league appearances and goals as of 10 June 2026

Arturo Molino Tornero (born 18 July 1996) is a Spanish footballer who plays as a central midfielder for Primera Federación club Ponferradina.

== Club career ==
Born in Abarán, Region of Murcia, Molina finished his formation with Real Murcia. He made his senior debut with the reserves during the 2013–14 season, in Tercera División.

Molina was promoted to the main squad in Segunda División B for the 2014–15 campaign, being regularly used afterwards. On 29 July 2016, after falling down the pecking order, he was loaned to Levante UD's reserves in the same category, for one year.

In July 2017, after scoring seven goals for the side, Molina signed a permanent deal with the Granotes, for a fee of €150,000; he was subsequently loaned to Real Madrid Castilla later in the month. Upon returning, he was assigned to Levante B, becoming a regular starter afterwards.

On 28 July 2020, Molina signed a four-year contract with the club, being definitely promoted to the main squad in La Liga. On 5 October, however, he was loaned to Segunda División side CD Castellón, for one year.

Molina made his professional debut on 21 October 2020, coming on as a late substitute for Eneko Satrústegui in a 1–2 away loss against UD Las Palmas. He returned to Levante in July 2021, after suffering relegation with Castellón, but terminated his contract on 6 July.

On 31 August 2021, Molina signed a one-year deal with CF Fuenlabrada in the second division, but terminated his contract the following 22 January. A day later, he signed a six-month contract with Racing de Santander in the third level.

On 30 January 2024, Molina signed for Ibiza.
