= Jorge Fernández (footballer, born 1992) =

Spanish footballer

Personal information
- Full name: Jorge Fernández Lucas
- Date of birth: 3 February 1992 (age 34)
- Place of birth: Cuenca, Spain
- Height: 1.70 m (5 ft 7 in)
- Position: Winger

Youth career
- Conquense
- 2010–2011: San José Obrero

Senior career*
Years	Team	Apps	(Gls)
2011–2014	Conquense	75	(3)
2014–2015	La Roda	9	(2)
2015–2017	Coruxo	47	(3)
2017–2018	Talavera	27	(5)
2018–2019	Conquense	35	(3)
2019–2023	Castellón	55	(3)
- * Club domestic league appearances and goals as of 22 January 2023

Jorge Fernández Lucas (born 3 February 1992) is a Spanish professional footballer who plays as a left winger.

== Club career ==
Born in Cuenca, Castilla–La Mancha, Fernández represented UB Conquense and CD San José Obrero as a youth. In 2011 he rejoined Conquense, being assigned to the first team in Segunda División B and making his first team debut on 28 August of that year, coming on as a second-half substitute for Adrián Martín in a 0–2 home loss against Real Madrid Castilla.

Fernández scored his first senior goal on 25 September 2011, netting the opener in a 3–3 home draw against CD Leganés, but only featured sparingly as his side suffered relegation. He left the club in 2014, moving to fellow third division side La Roda CF in August of that year.

Fernández continued to appear in the third tier in the following years, representing Coruxo FC, CF Talavera de la Reina, Conquense and CD Castellón. He renewed his contract with the latter until 2022 on 4 February 2020, and contributed with 27 appearances (play-offs included) during the campaign, which ended in promotion to Segunda División.

Fernández made his professional debut on 12 September 2020 at the age of 28, starting in a 2–1 away win against SD Ponferradina.
