= Mere (footballer) =

Spanish footballer (born 1975)

Personal information
- Full name: Baldomero Hermoso Herrera
- Date of birth: 15 March 1975 (age 51)
- Place of birth: El Puerto de Santa María, Spain
- Height: 1.83 m (6 ft 0 in)
- Position: Centre back

Youth career
- Cádiz

Senior career*
Years	Team	Apps	(Gls)
1993–1994	Cádiz B		
1994–1998	Cádiz	18	(1)
1998–1999	Algeciras	28	(2)
1999–2001	Motril	48	(0)
2001	Granada	0	(0)
2001–2002	Mensajero	19	(1)
2002–2004	Jerez Industrial		
2004–2005	Portuense		

Managerial career
- 2006–2008: Portuense (assistant)
- 2011–2012: Puerto Real
- 2012–2013: Portuense
- 2013–2014: Conil
- 2014–2016: Algeciras
- 2016–2018: Cádiz B
- 2018–2020: Fuenlabrada
- 2020: Alcorcón
- 2021–2022: Logroñés
- 2022–2023: Fuenlabrada
- 2023–2024: Linense
- 2024: Melilla
- * Club domestic league appearances and goals

Lauri Baldomero Hermoso Herrera (born 15 March 1975), commonly known as Mere, is a Spanish retired footballer who played as a central defender. He was most recently manager of UD Melilla, leaving the post in October 2024.

== Club career ==
Born in El Puerto de Santa María, Cádiz, Andalusia, Mere made his first team debut with Cádiz CF at the age of just 19. In 1998, after being sparingly used, he moved to fellow Segunda División B side Algeciras CF, suffering relegation at the end of the campaign.

Mere resumed his career in his native region, representing Motril CF, Granada CF, CD Mensajero, Jerez Industrial CF and Racing Club Portuense. He retired with the latter in 2005, aged 30.

== Managerial career ==
Shortly after retiring Mere started working as a coach, being José Luis Burgueña's assistant at last club Portuense. In December 2011, he was appointed manager of Puerto Real CF in Primera Andaluza, and took the club to a second place finish.

Mere returned to Portuense on 3 June 2012, being named manager of the main squad in Tercera División. Subsequently, he was also in charge of Conil CF before being appointed at another club he represented as a player, Algeciras, on 25 June 2014.

Mere achieved promotion to the third division in 2015, but was sacked on 28 March of the following year. On 1 August 2016 he returned to Cádiz, being named manager of the reserves in the fifth tier.

On 27 June 2018, after achieving two consecutive promotions, Mere announced his departure from Cádiz, and was appointed manager of CF Fuenlabrada on 23 July. With the latter, he achieved a first-ever promotion to Segunda División after defeating Recreativo de Huelva in the play-offs, then sealed the league championship with a win over Racing de Santander.

Mere's first professional match occurred on 17 August 2019, with his side achieving a 2–0 win over Elche CF at the Estadio Manuel Martínez Valero. Despite staying in the play-off zone in the first months of the season, he was dismissed on 10 March of the following year, after 13 winless matches.

Remaining in the Community of Madrid and the second division, Mere was hired at AD Alcorcón for the 2020–21 season, but was sacked on 9 November 2020 after eight consecutive losses. The following 24 June, he took over UD Logroñés, freshly relegated to Primera División RFEF.

Sacked by Logroñés on 3 April 2022, Mere returned to Fuenla on 2 June, with the club now also in the third division.

== Managerial statistics ==
As of match played 13 October 2024

Managerial record by team and tenure
Team	Nat	From	To	Record								Ref
Team	Nat	From	To	G	W	D	L	GF	GA	GD	Win %	Ref
Puerto Real	(Spain)	6 December 2011	3 June 2012	21	12	4	5	36	23	+13	57.14	
Portuense	(Spain)	3 June 2012	22 May 2013	38	11	16	11	36	35	+1	28.95	
Conil	(Spain)	12 November 2013	25 June 2014	25	12	5	8	31	21	+10	48.00	
Algeciras	(Spain)	25 June 2014	28 March 2016	81	44	16	21	106	69	+37	54.32	
Cádiz B	(Spain)	1 August 2016	27 June 2018	82	47	25	10	140	53	+87	57.32	
Fuenlabrada	(Spain)	23 July 2018	10 March 2020	77	32	28	17	91	59	+32	41.56	
Alcorcón	(Spain)	26 July 2020	9 November 2020	10	1	1	8	3	14	−11	10.00	
UD Logroñés	(Spain)	24 June 2021	3 April 2022	31	14	8	9	31	28	+3	45.16	
Fuenlabrada	(Spain)	2 June 2022	15 February 2023	24	6	5	13	17	34	−17	25.00	
Linense	(Spain)	5 July 2023	6 March 2024	25	9	8	8	25	24	+1	36.00	
Melilla	(Spain)	12 June 2024	14 October 2024	9	2	3	4	4	8	−4	22.22	
Total				423	190	119	114	520	368	+152	44.92	—

== Honours ==
Fuenlabrada

- Segunda División B: 2018–19
