= Guillem Jaime =

Spanish footballer

Personal information
- Full name: Guillem Jaime Serrano
- Date of birth: 6 January 1999 (age 27)
- Place of birth: Tarragona, Spain
- Height: 1.77 m (5 ft 9 1/2 in)
- Position: Right-back

Team information
- Current team: Egnatia
- Number: 22

Youth career
- Torreforta
- 2007–2018: Barcelona

Senior career*
Years	Team	Apps	(Gls)
2018–2020	Barcelona B	47	(1)
2020–2021	Castellón	11	(0)
2021	→ Gimnàstic (loan)	4	(0)
2021–2022	Barcelona B	22	(0)
2022–2024	Intercity	66	(5)
2024–2025	Antequera	17	(0)
2025–	Egnatia	32	(1)

International career
2014–2015	Spain U16	4	(0)
- * Club domestic league appearances and goals as of 25 June 2026

Guillem Jaime Serrano (born 6 January 1999) is a Spanish professional footballer who plays as a right-back for Egnatia.

== Club career ==
Born in Tarragona, Catalonia, Jaime joined FC Barcelona's La Masia in 2007, from CDC Torreforta. On 9 July 2018, he renewed his contract until 2020, with a release clause of €1 million, and was promoted to the reserves in Segunda División B.

Jaime made his senior debut on 9 September 2018, starting in a 1–0 away win against CE Sabadell FC. His first goal occurred roughly one year later, in a 2–2 home draw against Gimnàstic de Tarragona.

Jaime left Barça on 30 June 2020, as his contract expired, and signed a two-year deal with Segunda División newcomers CD Castellón on 28 August. He made his professional debut on 24 October, starting in a 0–1 home loss against Girona FC.

On 1 February 2021, Jaime was loaned to third division side Gimnàstic de Tarragona for the remainder of the season. On 17 August, he returned to Barcelona and its B-team, now in the newly created Primera División RFEF, on a one-year contract.

On 13 July 2022, Jaime agreed to a two-year deal with CF Intercity in the third division.

On 5 January 2025, Jaime joined third division side Antequera.

== Career statistics ==
=== Club ===
As of 16 November 2020

Appearances and goals by club, season and competition
Club	Season	League			National Cup		Continental		Other		Total	
Club	Season	Division	Apps	Goals	Apps	Goals	Apps	Goals	Apps	Goals	Apps	Goals
Barcelona B	2018–19	Segunda División B	25	0	—		—		—		25	0
Barcelona B	2019–20	Segunda División B	22	1	—		—		—		22	1
Barcelona B	Total		47	1	0	0	0	0	0	0	47	1
Castellón	2020–21	Segunda División	11	0	0	0	—		—		3	0
Career total			58	1	0	0	0	0	0	0	58	1

== Honours ==
=== Club ===
Barcelona

- UEFA Youth League: 2017–18
