= Estadio Nuevo Mirador =

Sporting venue in Spain

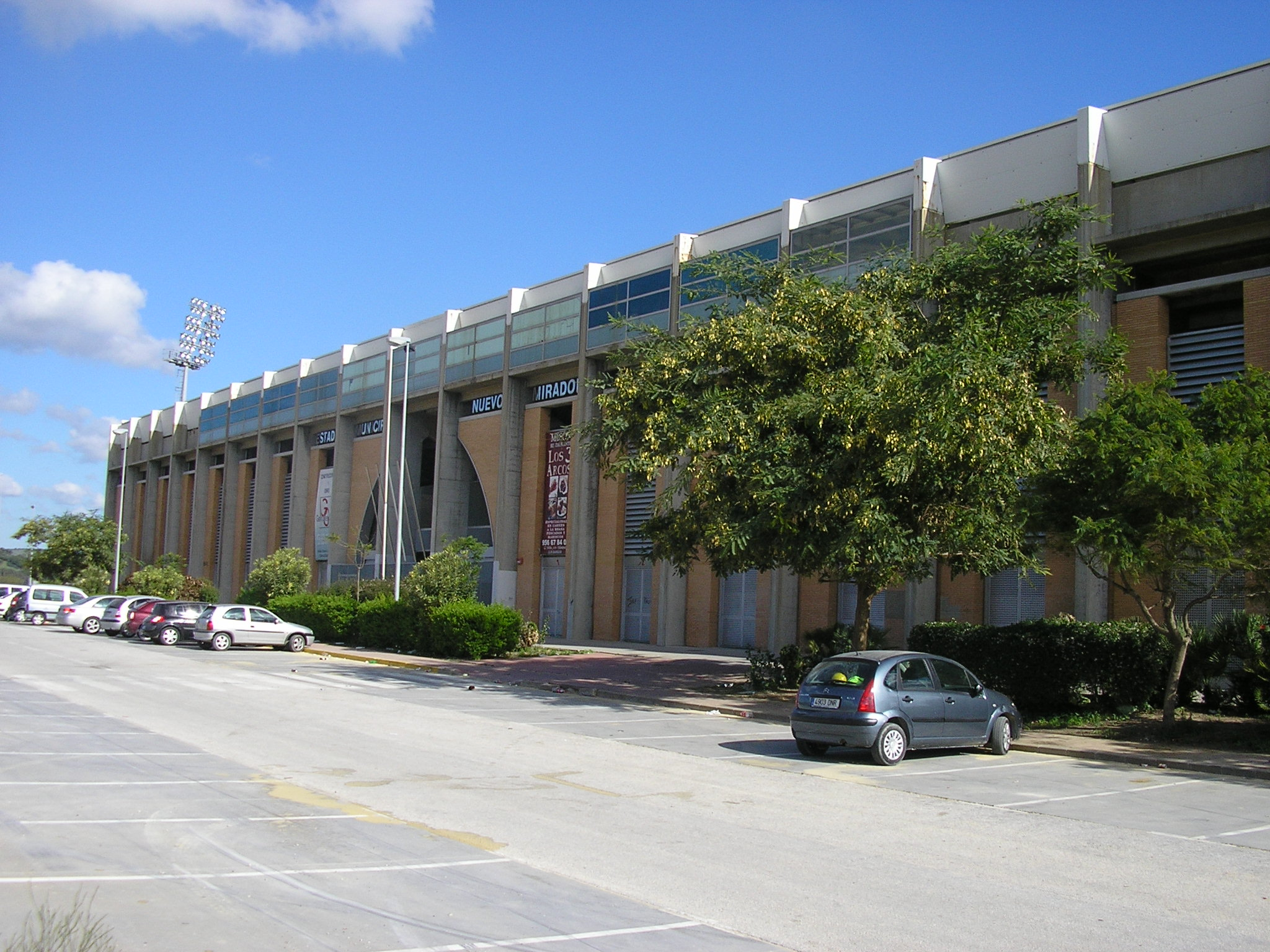
- Interactive map of Estadio Nuevo Mirador
- Full name: Estadio Nuevo Mirador
- Location: Algeciras; Spain
- Coordinates: 36°09′48″N 5°27′55″W
- Owner: Ayuntamiento de Algeciras
- Operator: Algeciras CF
- Capacity: 7,200
- Field size: 105 x 70 metres

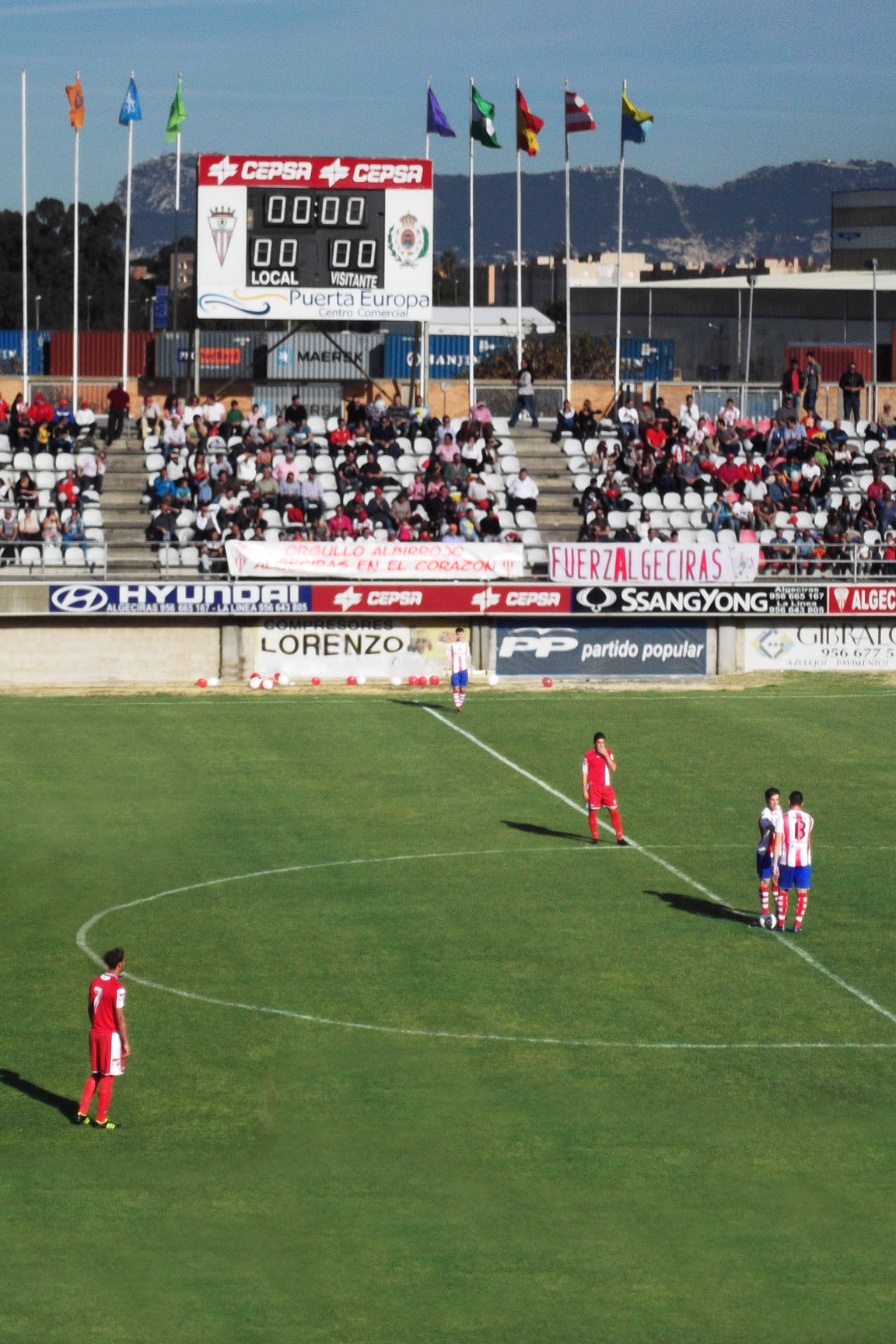

Estadio Nuevo Mirador is the Municipal Stadium of Algeciras, Spain. It is the home stadium of the football club Algeciras CF. The stadium with a capacity for 7,200 spectators, and measuring 105 by 68 metres, is a modern sports complex located in the industrial area of La Menacha, and also houses the offices of the club. The new stadium was inaugurated in 1999, replacing an earlier stadium which was used from 1954 until 1999. It was the stadium for England women vs Austria women and England women vs Italy women in February 2024.

== Links ==
- Estadios de España (in English)
