= Víctor San Bartolomé =

Spanish footballer (born 1999)

Personal information
- Full name: Víctor San Bartolomé Prieto
- Date of birth: 26 October 1999 (age 27)
- Place of birth: Barakaldo, Spain
- Height: 1.86 m (6 ft 1 in)
- Position: Midfielder

Team information
- Current team: Albacete
- Number: 14

Youth career
- Pauldarrak
- 2009–2017: Athletic Bilbao

Senior career*
Years	Team	Apps	(Gls)
2016–2018	Basconia	23	(0)
2017–2022	Bilbao Athletic	90	(6)
2022–2024	Celta B	38	(1)
2024–2025	Real Unión	29	(6)
2025–2026	Barakaldo	19	(7)
2026–	Albacete	14	(0)
- * Club domestic league appearances and goals as of 9 June 2026

Víctor San Bartolomé Prieto (born 26 October 1999) is a Spanish footballer who plays as a midfielder for Albacete Balompié.

== Career ==
Born in Barakaldo, Biscay, Basque Country, San Bartolomé joined Athletic Bilbao's Lezama Facilities in 2009, from hometown side Pauldarrak FKT. After making his senior debut with farm team CD Basconia in 2016, he first appeared with the reserves on 16 September 2017, starting in a 0–0 Segunda División B home draw against SD Gernika Club.

A member of Bilbao Athletic in the following seasons, San Bartolomé was unable to establish himself as a regular starter after struggling with several minor injuries. On 20 July 2022, he moved to another reserve team, Celta de Vigo B in Primera Federación.

On 14 July 2023, after being an undisputed starter for Celta, San Bartolomé renewed his contract for three further years, but suffered a tibia fracture shortly after which kept him sidelined for most of the season. On 5 July 2024, he signed for fellow third division side Real Unión on a one-year deal.

On 11 March 2025, after being regularly used for the Txuri-beltz, San Bartolomé renewed his link with the club until 2027. On 7 July, after suffering relegation, he agreed to a deal with Barakaldo CF still in division three.

On 2 February 2026, San Bartolomé signed a two-and-a-half-year contract with Segunda División club Albacete Balompié, after the club activated his release clause. He made his professional debut six days later, coming on as a second-half substitute for Víctor Valverde in a 2–1 away loss to Deportivo de La Coruña.
