= Villamalea =

Coordinates: 39°22′N 1°35′W

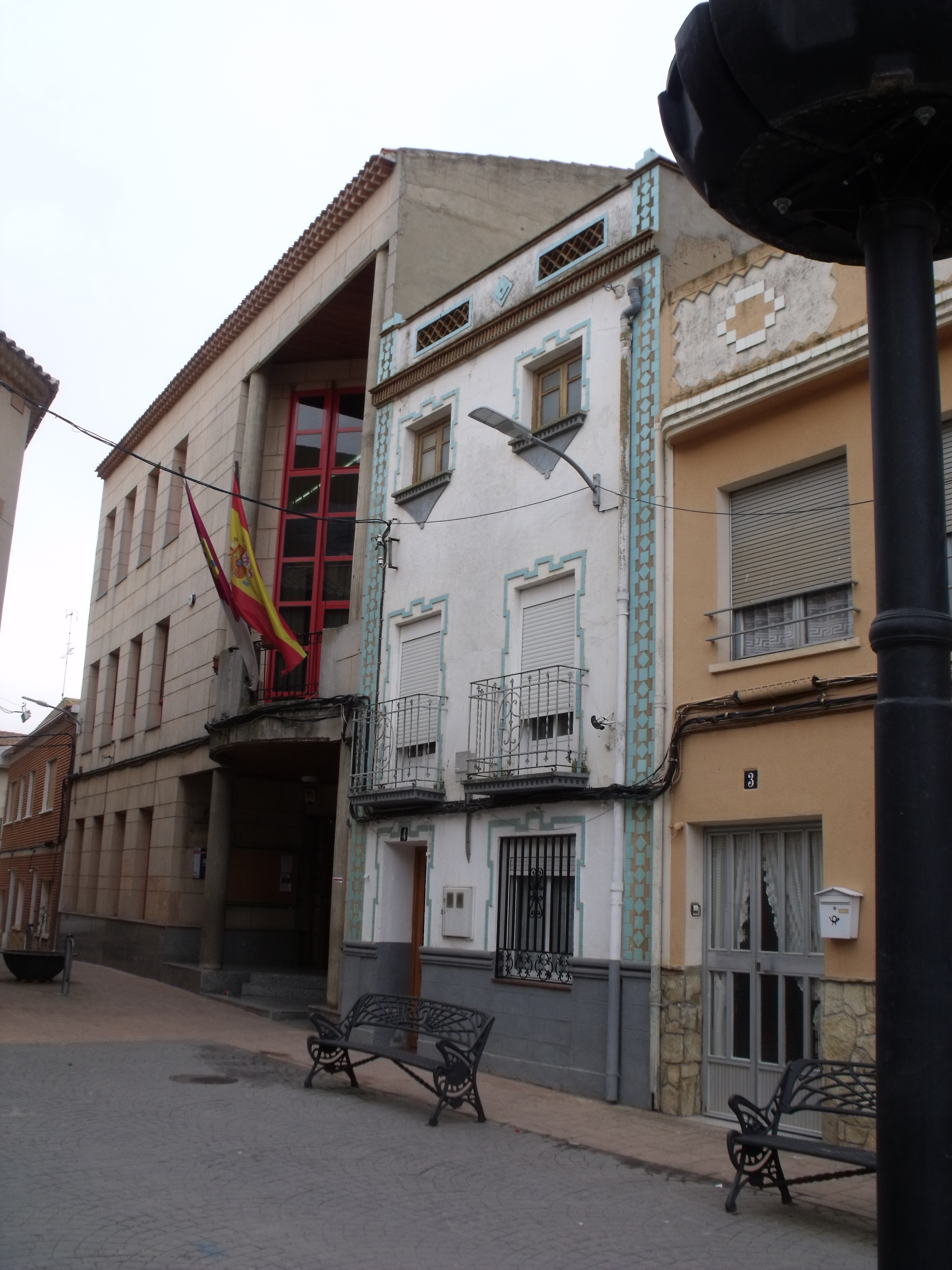

Villamalea is a municipality in Albacete, Castile-La Mancha, Spain. It has a population of 4,124.
