= Álvaro Campos =

Spanish footballer

Personal information
- Full name: Álvaro Campos Estellés
- Date of birth: 1 April 1987 (age 39)
- Place of birth: Mislata, Spain
- Height: 1.87 m (6 ft 2 in)
- Position: Goalkeeper

Youth career
- Levante

Senior career*
Years	Team	Apps	(Gls)
2006–2008	Levante B	1	(0)
2006–2007	→ Requena (loan)	32	(0)
2007–2008	→ Ontinyent (loan)	23	(0)
2008–2010	Murcia B	49	(0)
2010–2011	Cádiz	27	(0)
2011–2013	Albacete	36	(0)
2013–2014	Guadalajara	38	(0)
2014–2016	Castellón	67	(0)
2016–2017	Lleida Esportiu	36	(0)
2017–2018	Ontinyent	38	(0)
2018–2022	Castellón	115	(0)
- * Club domestic league appearances and goals as of 30 June 2022

Álvaro Campos Estellés (born 1 April 1987) is a Spanish professional footballer as a goalkeeper.

== Club career ==
Born in Mislata, Valencian Community, Campos was a Levante UD youth graduate, and made his senior debut with the reserves on 15 January 2006 by starting in a 0–0 Segunda División B home draw against CE Sabadell FC. On 30 July 2008, after loans at SC Requena and Ontinyent CF, he terminated his contract with the Granotas and joined Real Murcia; but only appeared for their B-team.

Campos left Murcia in 2010, and subsequently represented Cádiz CF, Albacete Balompié and CD Guadalajara in the third division. On 19 September 2014, he signed for CD Castellón in Tercera División,

On 30 July 2016, Campos agreed to a contract with Lleida Esportiu in the third division. On 17 August of the following year, he returned to former side Ontinyent, in the same category.

On 2 July 2018, Campos returned to Castellón on a two-year deal, with the side now in the division three. Roughly one year later, he renewed his contract until 2022, and contributed with 30 appearances in the 2019–20 season (play-offs included) as his side achieved promotion to Segunda División after a ten-year absence.

Campos made his professional debut on 12 September 2020 at the age of 33, starting in a 2–1 away win against SD Ponferradina but being substituted by Óscar Whalley due to an injury.
