= Iñigo Muñoz =

Spanish footballer

Personal information
- Full name: Iñigo Muñoz Cuevas
- Date of birth: 16 December 1996 (age 29)
- Place of birth: Bilbao, Spain
- Height: 1.67 m (5 ft 6 in)
- Position: Winger

Team information
- Current team: Barakaldo
- Number: 14

Youth career
- 2008–2015: Danok Bat

Senior career*
Years	Team	Apps	(Gls)
2015–2016	Somorrostro	?	(8)
2016–2017	Gernika	37	(3)
2017–2019	Athletic Bilbao B	55	(4)
2017	Athletic Bilbao	0	(0)
2019–2021	Castellón	21	(1)
2021–2022	Unionistas	35	(4)
2022–2023	Cultural y Deportiva Leonesa	11	(0)
2023	Numancia	15	(2)
2023–2024	Real Unión	24	(0)
2024–2025	Amorebieta	38	(4)
2025–	Barakaldo	30	(1)
- * Club domestic league appearances and goals as of 9 June 2026

Iñigo Muñoz Cuevas (Basque: [iɲiɣo muɲos̻]; Spanish: [ˈiɲiɣo muˈɲoθ]; born 16 December 1996) is a Spanish professional footballer who plays as a right winger for Primera Federación club Barakaldo.

== Club career ==
Born in Bilbao, Biscay, Basque Country, Muñoz made his senior debut with JD Somorrostro in the regional leagues. On 15 June 2016, he signed for Gernika Club of Segunda División B.

Muñoz made his senior debut on 21 August 2016, starting in a 2–1 away loss against UD San Sebastián de los Reyes. He scored his first goal six days later, his team's third in the 4–1 home win over CDA Navalcarnero.

On 30 March 2017, Muñoz agreed to a two-year contract with La Liga club Athletic Bilbao, which was made effective on 1 July; he was initially assigned to the reserves also in the third division. He played his first competitive match with the main squad on 25 October, coming on as a second-half substitute for Ager Aketxe in a 1–1 draw at SD Formentera in the round of 32 of the Copa del Rey.

After helping CD Castellón return to the Segunda División after ten years at the end of 2019–20, Muñoz made only one official appearance in the first part of the following season. He returned to the third tier in the 2021 January transfer window, joining Unionistas de Salamanca CF.

On 25 July 2024, Muñoz signed with Amorebieta in the third tier.
