= César Díaz (Spanish footballer) =

Spanish footballer

Personal information
- Full name: César Díaz Martínez
- Date of birth: 5 January 1987 (age 39)
- Place of birth: Villamalea, Spain
- Height: 1.71 m (5 ft 7 in)
- Position: Forward

Youth career
- Albacete

Senior career*
Years	Team	Apps	(Gls)
2003–2005	Albacete B		
2005–2009	Albacete	24	(1)
2008	→ Alcoyano (loan)	10	(1)
2009	→ Zamora (loan)	14	(0)
2009–2010	Sangonera	33	(15)
2010–2011	Almería B	35	(3)
2011–2012	Teruel	33	(7)
2012–2013	Melilla	35	(10)
2013–2016	Albacete	104	(20)
2016–2019	Racing Santander	53	(7)
2019	→ Castellón (loan)	18	(8)
2019–2022	Castellón	86	(14)
2022–2024	Atlético Saguntino	11	(1)
Total		456	(87)

International career
2004	Spain U17	7	(5)
2006	Spain U19	2	(2)
2007	Spain U20	1	(1)
Medal record
Men's football
Representing Spain
UEFA European Under-17 Championship
Runner-up	2004 France
- * Club domestic league appearances and goals

César Díaz Martínez (Spanish pronunciation: [ˈθesaɾ ˈði.aθ maɾˈtineθ]; (Note: In isolation, Díaz is pronounced [ˈdi.aθ].) born 5 January 1987) is a Spanish former professional footballer who played as a forward.

== Honours ==
Spain U19

- UEFA European Under-19 Championship: 2006
