= Rubén Díez =

Spanish footballer

Personal information
- Full name: Rubén Díez Adán
- Date of birth: 18 August 1993 (age 33)
- Place of birth: Zaragoza, Spain
- Height: 1.66 m (5 ft 5 in)
- Position: Midfielder

Team information
- Current team: Zaragoza

Youth career
- Stadium Casablanca

Senior career*
Years	Team	Apps	(Gls)
2012–2013	Valdefierro	27	(8)
2013–2014	Almudévar	30	(4)
2014–2015	Ebro	23	(6)
2015–2016	Zaragoza B	34	(2)
2016–2018	Tarazona	68	(14)
2018–2019	Teruel	18	(1)
2019–2021	Castellón	82	(14)
2021–2024	Tenerife	28	(1)
2022–2023	→ Deportivo La Coruña (loan)	34	(3)
2023–2024	→ Ibiza (loan)	33	(1)
2024–2026	Ceuta	62	(6)
2026–	Zaragoza	0	(0)
- * Club domestic league appearances and goals as of 31 May 2026

Rubén Díez Adán (born 18 August 1993), sometimes known as Jamelli, is a Spanish professional footballer who plays for Real Zaragoza. Mainly a central midfielder, he can also play as an attacking midfielder.

== Club career ==
Born in Zaragoza, Aragon, Díez finished his formation with Stadium Casablanca, and made his debut as a senior with CD Valdefierro during the 2012–13 season, in Tercera División. On 29 June 2013, he moved to SD Huesca and was assigned to the farm team also in the fourth tier.

Díez first arrived in Segunda División B in July 2018 with CD Teruel, after representing fourth division sides CD Ebro, Deportivo Aragón and SD Tarazona. On 21 January 2019, he moved to fellow league team CD Castellón.

On 6 March 2020, Díez renewed his contract with the Orelluts until 2022, and contributed with six goals in 29 appearances during the campaign as his side achieved promotion to Segunda División.

On 12 September 2020, aged 27, Díez made his professional debut by starting in a 2–1 away win against SD Ponferradina. He scored his first professional goal fourteen days later, netting the opener in a 1–1 away draw against UD Logroñés.

On 16 August 2021, after the Orelluts' relegation, Díez signed a four-year contract with CD Tenerife also in the second division. On 3 August of the following year, he moved to Primera Federación side Deportivo de La Coruña on a one-year loan deal.

On 14 July 2023, Díez moved to fellow third division side UD Ibiza also on loan. He terminated his link with Tete on 27 July 2024, and joined AD Ceuta FC also in division three just hours later.

On 8 June 2026, Díez agreed to a two-year deal with hometown side Real Zaragoza, freshly relegated to the third tier.
