= Iago Indias =

Spanish footballer

Personal information
- Full name: Iago Indias Fernández
- Date of birth: 3 January 1996 (age 30)
- Place of birth: Vigo, Spain
- Height: 1.74 m (5 ft 9 in)
- Position: Centre back

Team information
- Current team: Ibiza
- Number: 18

Youth career
- Sant Andreu de la Barca
- 2009–2010: Santboià
- 2010–2015: Espanyol

Senior career*
Years	Team	Apps	(Gls)
2014–2020	Espanyol B	134	(4)
2020–2021	Castellón	22	(0)
2021–2022	Sabadell	26	(1)
2022–2024	Castellón	56	(3)
2024–	Ibiza	57	(2)
- * Club domestic league appearances and goals as of 10 June 2026

Iago Indias Fernández (born 3 January 1996) is a Spanish professional footballer who plays for UD Ibiza. Mainly a central defender, he can also play as a right back.

== Club career ==
Born in Vigo, Galicia, Indias represented CF Sant Andreu de la Barca and FC Santboià before joining RCD Espanyol's youth setup in 2010. He made his senior debut with the reserves on 8 November 2014, coming on as a late substitute for goalscorer Jairo Morillas in a 2–0 Segunda División B home win against Gimnàstic de Tarragona.

Indias scored his first senior goal on 10 March 2019, netting the opener in a 4–0 home routing of UB Conquense. On 7 June, he renewed his contract until 2021.

Indias terminated his contract with the Pericos on 24 August 2020, and signed a two-year contract with Segunda División newcomers CD Castellón just hours later. He made his professional debut on 7 December, replacing Marc Mateu in a 1–3 away loss against RCD Mallorca.
