= Alejandro Marcos =

Spanish footballer

Personal information
- Full name: Alejandro Marcos López
- Date of birth: 29 February 2000 (age 26)
- Place of birth: Badalona, Spain
- Height: 1.89 m (6 ft 2 in)
- Position: Centre back

Team information
- Current team: Porreres
- Number: 2

Youth career
- Sant Gabriel
- 2008–2019: Barcelona
- 2019–2020: Torino

Senior career*
Years	Team	Apps	(Gls)
2020–2022	Castellón	8	(0)
2021	→ Llagostera (loan)	5	(0)
2022–2023	Burgos B	28	(0)
2023–2024	Levante B	31	(0)
2024–2025	Badalona Futur	30	(0)
2025–	Porreres	23	(0)
- * Club domestic league appearances and goals as of 15 May 2026

Alejandro Marcos López (born 29 February 2000) is a Spanish footballer who plays as a central defender for Porreres.

== Club career ==
Born in Badalona, Barcelona, Catalonia, Marcos joined FC Barcelona's La Masia in 2008, from CE Sant Gabriel. On 1 February 2019, he moved to Serie A side Torino, being assigned to the Primavera squad.

On 5 October 2020, after finishing his formation, Marcos signed a two-year contract with CD Castellón in Segunda División. He made his senior debut the following 6 January, coming on as a second-half substitute for Adrián Lapeña in a 0–2 home loss against CD Tenerife, for the season's Copa del Rey.

On 20 January 2021, Marcos was loaned to Segunda División B side UE Llagostera for the remainder of the season. Upon returning, he was mainly a backup option during the 2021–22 Primera División RFEF and subsequently left Castellón in June 2022.

In the following two years, Marcos played for reserve teams, representing Burgos CF Promesas in Segunda Federación and Atlético Levante UD in Tercera Federación.
