= Óscar Cano =

Spanish football manager

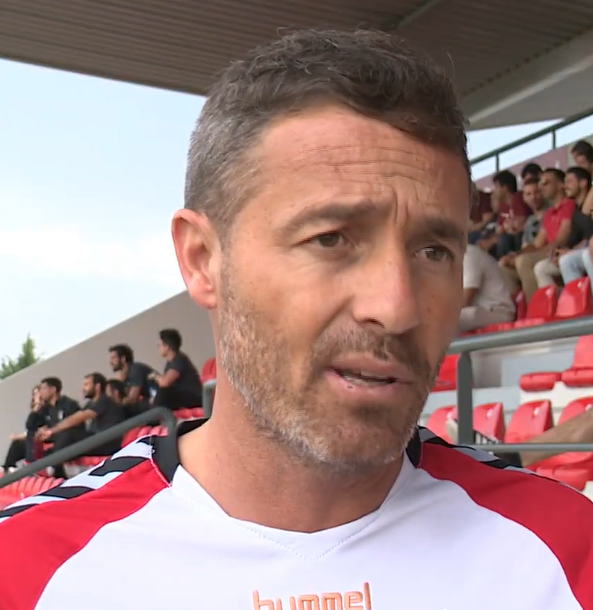
- Cano in 2019

Personal information
- Full name: Óscar Pedro Cano Moreno
- Date of birth: 6 November 1972 (age 53)
- Place of birth: Granada, Spain

Team information
- Current team: Zamora (manager)

Managerial career
- Years: Team
- 1997–1999: Granada (youth)
- 1999–2003: Imperio Albolote (youth)
- 2003–2005: Imperio Albolote
- 2005–2006: Arenas Armilla
- 2006–2007: Baza
- 2007–2008: Granada
- 2010: Poli Ejido
- 2010–2011: Salamanca
- 2011–2012: Melilla
- 2012–2014: Betis B
- 2014–2015: Alcoyano
- 2015: Elche B
- 2016: Qatar U19
- 2018–2021: Castellón
- 2021–2022: Badajoz
- 2022–2023: Deportivo La Coruña
- 2023–2024: Sabadell
- 2024: Tenerife
- 2025: Zhejiang FC (assistant)
- 2025–: Zamora

Óscar Pedro Cano Moreno (born 6 November 1972) is a Spanish football manager, currently in charge of Zamora CF.

== Manager career ==
Born in Granada, Andalusia, Cano began his managerial career at lowly Imperio Albolote and subsequently managed neighbours Arenas Armilla in the Tercera División, before moving to Segunda División B side Baza in the 2006 summer. After taking the club to a historical 12th position, he was appointed at the helm of Granada, also in the third level.

In October 2008, Cano left the club and was appointed Poli Ejido manager in January 2010. On 1 July 2010 he was appointed at Segunda División's Salamanca, replacing resigned Jorge D'Alessandro.

Cano was sacked by the Charros on 14 February 2011, after suffering ten consecutive defeats. On 26 July, he joined Melilla, leaving the club in June 2012.

On 10 December 2012, Cano was appointed at the helm of Real Betis B, replacing fired Puma. After achieving promotion back to the third level at the end of the 2013–14 campaign, he signed for Alcoyano; he was sacked on 16 February 2015, after only winning three points out of 18.

On 14 July 2015, Cano was named Elche B manager, but resigned on 3 August due to the club's poor in and out field situation.

Cano was hired by third-tier club Castellón on 10 December 2018, after the dismissal of David Gutiérrez. In his first full season with the Valencians, they won their group before defeating Cornellà in a single-leg playoff final at La Rosaleda Stadium to return to the second division for the first time in a decade.

On 11 January 2021, Cano left the Orelluts on a mutual agreement. He took over Primera División RFEF side Badajoz on 1 July, but was sacked on 8 February 2022.

Cano subsequently worked at third division sides Deportivo de La Coruña and Sabadell, being sacked from the former due to a poor away form, and leaving the latter after failing to avoid relegation in the 2023–24 season. On 3 June 2024, he returned to the second division after being named in charge of Tenerife, but was sacked after five winless matches.

In January 2025, Cano was named assistant manager of Raúl Caneda in the Chinese Super League club Zhejiang FC. On 4 November, he was appointed manager of Zamora CF in his country's third tier.

== Managerial statistics ==
As of 13 June 2026

Managerial record by team and tenure
Team	Nat	From	To	Record								Ref
Team	Nat	From	To	G	W	D	L	GF	GA	GD	Win %	Ref
Imperio Albolote	(Spain)	1 July 2003	30 June 2005	72	32	21	19	93	62	+31	44.44	
Arenas Armilla	(Spain)	30 June 2005	1 July 2006	40	21	14	5	58	29	+29	52.50	
Baza	(Spain)	1 July 2006	30 June 2007	38	13	13	12	51	46	+5	34.21	
Granada	(Spain)	30 June 2007	26 October 2008	49	18	18	13	66	53	+13	36.73	
Poli Ejido	(Spain)	6 January 2010	1 July 2010	21	10	6	5	30	19	+11	47.62	
Salamanca	(Spain)	1 July 2010	14 February 2011	25	7	3	15	27	38	−11	28.00	
Melilla	(Spain)	26 July 2011	8 June 2012	39	18	10	11	50	34	+16	46.15	
Betis B	(Spain)	10 December 2012	26 June 2014	66	29	17	20	99	71	+28	43.94	
Alcoyano	(Spain)	26 June 2014	16 February 2015	30	11	9	10	26	31	−5	36.67	
Elche B	(Spain)	14 July 2015	3 August 2015	0	0	0	0	0	0	+0	—	
Castellón	(Spain)	10 December 2018	11 January 2021	81	31	24	26	92	83	+9	38.27	
Badajoz	(Spain)	2 July 2021	8 February 2022	23	7	9	7	23	23	+0	30.43	
Deportivo La Coruña	(Spain)	11 October 2022	15 May 2023	30	14	9	7	40	24	+16	46.67	
Sabadell	(Spain)	20 November 2023	28 May 2024	25	9	8	8	25	33	−8	36.00	
Tenerife	(Spain)	3 June 2024	15 September 2024	5	0	1	4	3	7	−4	0.00	
Zamora	(Spain)	4 November 2025	Present	31	16	7	8	43	30	+13	51.61	
Total				575	236	169	170	726	583	+143	41.04	—
