= Joseba Muguruza =

Spanish footballer

Personal information
- Full name: Joseba Muguruza Bengoz
- Date of birth: 11 January 1994 (age 32)
- Place of birth: Deba, Spain
- Height: 1.71 m (5 ft 7 in)
- Position: Right back

Team information
- Current team: Inter Club d'Escaldes
- Number: 22

Youth career
- Real Sociedad

Senior career*
Years	Team	Apps	(Gls)
2013–2018	Real Sociedad B	134	(31)
2013–2014	→ Oiartzun (loan)	34	(12)
2018–2021	Castellón	77	(6)
2021–2022	Sabadell	32	(3)
2022–2024	Cultural	61	(2)
2024–	Inter Club d'Escaldes	42	(3)
- * Club domestic league appearances and goals as of 15 June 2026

Joseba Muguruza Bengoa (born 11 January 1994) is a Spanish professional footballer who plays for Andorran club Inter Club d'Escaldes. Mainly a right back, he can also play as a right winger.

== Club career ==
Muguruza was born in Deba, Gipuzkoa, Basque Country, and was a Real Sociedad youth graduate. In 2013, after finishing his formation, he was loaned to Tercera División side Oiartzun KE for the season.

Upon returning from loan, Muguruza was assigned to the reserves in Segunda División B. On 23 June 2017, he renewed his contract with Sanse for a further year, but left the club on 31 May 2018.

On 29 August 2018, Muguruza signed a three-year contract with CD Castellón also in the third division. Converted into a right back by manager Óscar Cano, he contributed with three goals in 30 appearances during the 2019–20 campaign, as his side achieved promotion to Segunda División.

Muguruza made his professional debut on 12 September 2020, starting in a 2–1 away win against SD Ponferradina.
