= Rafa Gálvez =

Spanish footballer

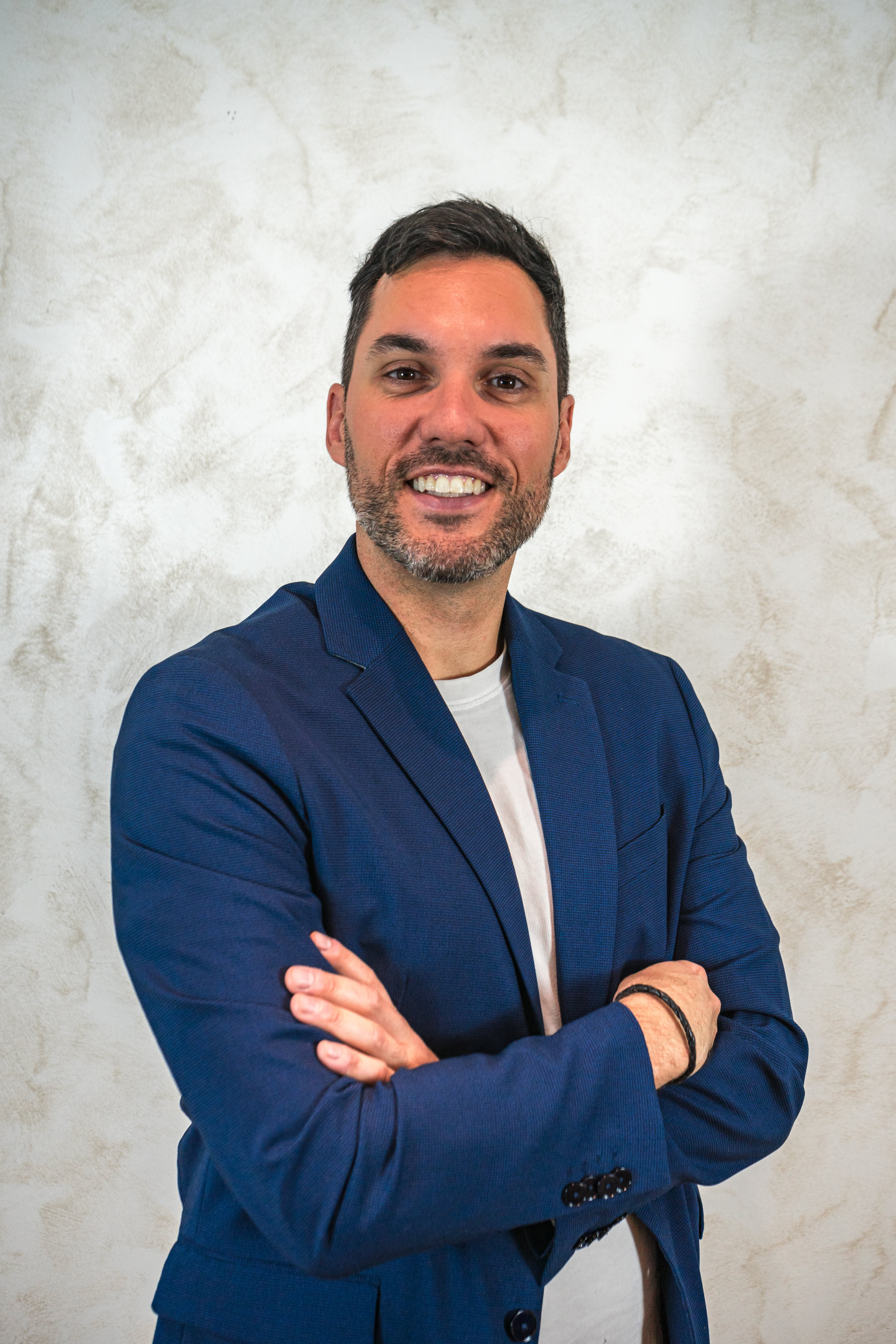

Personal information
- Full name: Rafael Gálvez Cerillo
- Date of birth: 20 May 1993 (age 33)
- Place of birth: Córdoba, Spain
- Height: 1.90 m (6 ft 3 in)
- Position: Midfielder

Team information
- Current team: Ciudad de Lucena

Youth career
- Maristas
- Córdoba

Senior career*
Years	Team	Apps	(Gls)
2011–2014	Córdoba B	89	(6)
2013–2014	Córdoba	5	(0)
2014–2015	Elche B	27	(1)
2015	Elche	4	(0)
2015–2016	Córdoba	20	(0)
2016–2018	Albacete	54	(5)
2018–2021	Castellón	95	(5)
2021–2022	Albacete	19	(1)
2022–2024	Intercity	39	(0)
2024	Sestao River	15	(0)
2025	Recreativo Huelva	5	(0)
2025–	Ciudad de Lucena	5	(1)
- * Club domestic league appearances and goals as of 9 November 2025

Rafael "Rafa" Gálvez Cerillo (born 20 May 1993) is a Spanish footballer who plays for Tercera Federación club Ciudad de Lucena as a midfielder.

== Club career ==
Born in Córdoba, Andalusia, Gálvez finished his graduation with local Córdoba CF, making his senior debuts with the reserves in the 2010–11.

On 11 September 2013 Gálvez made his official debut with Córdoba's first team, starting in a 2–2 draw against Deportivo de La Coruña in the season's Copa del Rey. His first league appearance came three days later, in a 3–1 home win over CD Numancia in the Segunda División.

On 7 July 2014 Gálvez moved to another reserve team, Elche CF Ilicitano, after agreeing to a two-year deal. He made his debut with the club's main squad on 15 January of the following year, starting in a 0–4 home loss against FC Barcelona, again in the national cup.

Gálvez made his La Liga debut on 18 January 2015, coming on as a late substitute for Mario Pašalić in a 1–0 home win against Levante UD. On 25 August he returned to Córdoba, now with the main squad.

On 20 July 2016 Gálvez rescinded with the Verdiblancos, and signed for Albacete Balompié just hours later. On 17 July 2018, he agreed to a three-year contract with CD Castellón, after terminating his contract with Alba.

On 29 July 2024, Gálvez signed with Primera Federación club Sestao River.
