= David Cubillas =

Spanish footballer

Personal information
- Full name: David Cubillas Peña
- Date of birth: 16 June 1990 (age 36)
- Place of birth: Castellón de la Plana, Spain
- Height: 1.90 m (6 ft 3 in)
- Position: Forward

Team information
- Current team: Tarazona
- Number: 9

Youth career
- Villarreal

Senior career*
Years	Team	Apps	(Gls)
2009–2011	Villarreal C	25	(10)
2010–2011	→ Benidorm (loan)	32	(4)
2011–2012	Deportivo B	34	(9)
2012–2013	Espanyol B	33	(8)
2013–2014	Huracán	14	(1)
2014	Villarreal C	12	(8)
2014–2015	Villarreal B	27	(6)
2015–2016	Huracán	15	(4)
2016–2017	Melilla	50	(8)
2017–2023	Castellón	177	(35)
2023–2026	Tarazona	83	(10)
- * Club domestic league appearances and goals as of 10 June 2026

David Cubillas Peña (born 19 June 1990) is a Spanish professional footballer who plays as a forward for Tarazona.

== Club career ==
Born in Castellón de la Plana, Valencian Community, Cubillas represented Villarreal CF as a youth, and made his debut for the C-team in Tercera División during the 2009–10 season. In 2010, he was loaned to Segunda División B side Benidorm CF for one year.

On 21 July 2011, Cubillas joined another reserve team, Deportivo Fabril also in the fourth tier. He subsequently represented RCD Espanyol B and Huracán Valencia CF before returning to Villarreal and its C-side on 1 February 2014.

On 29 July 2015, after spending the 2014–15 campaign at the service of Villarreal CF B, Cubillas returned to Huracán. The following 12 January, however, he moved to fellow third division side UD Melilla.

On 28 July 2017, Cubillas joined hometown side CD Castellón in the fourth division, on a one-year deal. He helped the side achieve promotion to the third division in his first season by scoring a career-best 20 goals, and to Segunda División in his third; on 22 May 2019, he extended his contract until 2021.

Cubillas made his professional debut on 12 September 2020 at the age of 30, coming on as a late substitute and scoring a last-minute winner in a 2–1 away win against SD Ponferradina.
