= Sergi Escobar (football manager) =

Spanish football manager

Personal information
- Full name: Sergio Escobar Cabus
- Date of birth: 13 April 1975 (age 51)
- Place of birth: Almassora, Spain

Team information
- Current team: Badalona Futur (manager)

Managerial career
- Years: Team
- Castellón (youth)
- 2012–2013: Alqueries
- 2013: Altura
- 2013–2014: Almazora
- 2014–2015: Vinaròs
- 2015: Segorbe
- 2015–2016: Burriana
- 2016–2017: Onda
- 2017: Castellón B
- 2017–2018: Castellón
- 2019–2020: Soneja
- 2020–2021: América de Cali (assistant)
- 2021: Šibenik
- 2021–2022: Castellón
- 2023–2024: Saguntino
- 2024–: Badalona Futur

Sergio "Sergi" Escobar Cabus (born 13 April 1975) is a Spanish professional football manager who is in charge of Badalona Futur.

== Career ==
Escobar began his career as a manager of CD Castellón's youth categories, and worked as manager at lower league sides Alqueries CF, CD Altura and CD Almazora in the regional leagues. In the 2014–15 campaign, he was in charge of Vinaròs CF before promoting CD Segorbe to the Preferente.

In the 2015–16 season he became head coach of CD Burriana, and was at the helm of CD Onda in 2016–17. With the latter, he won the Group 1 of the Preferente. In 197 games managed in Preferente, he has the highest average in history with 2.086 points per game.

In the summer of 2017, Escobar returned to Castellón after being named manager of the B-team, but was appointed in charge of the first team in the fourth division in November, after the dismissal of Frank Castelló. In June 2018, after achieving promotion to Segunda División B, he renewed his contract for two more seasons.

On 17 September 2018, Escobar was dismissed as head coach of CD Castellón, after the 2–2 draw against RCD Espanyol B and four games with three draws and one defeat. He led Castellón in 38 official matches in which he achieved 21 victories, 12 draws and 5 defeats. He also closed that stage without having suffered any defeat at the home stadium.

On 10 October 2019, Escobar returned to the regional leagues after being named manager of CD Soneja.

In July 2020, Escobar signed with Colombian Categoría Primera A club América de Cali, to be the assistant of Argentine Juan Cruz Real. In the inaugural season with the club, his side won the 2020 league championship.

On 30 March 2021, Escobar was appointed manager of Croatian Prva HNL club HNK Šibenik. In his first game four days later, he drew 1–1 against Dinamo Zagreb at home.

On 22 May 2021, Escobar returned to Castellón, with his side now in Segunda División.
