= Jesús Carrillo =

Spanish footballer

Personal information
- Full name: Jesús Manuel Carrillo Martínez
- Date of birth: 11 May 1999 (age 27)
- Place of birth: Alcantarilla, Spain
- Height: 1.71 m (5 ft 7 in)
- Position: Midfielder

Youth career
- Nova Vanguardia
- 2013–2016: Murcia
- 2016–2018: Málaga

Senior career*
Years	Team	Apps	(Gls)
2018	Albacete B	8	(1)
2018–2020	Cartagena	14	(0)
2020	Melilla	8	(0)
2020–2022	Castellón	10	(0)
2021	→ Murcia (loan)	13	(3)
2022–2023	Numancia	48	(3)
2023–2024	Racing Cartagena MM	29	(0)
2025	Yeclano Deportivo	1	(0)
- * Club domestic league appearances and goals as of 24 May 2025

Jesús Manuel Carrillo Martínez (born 11 May 1999) is a Spanish professional footballer who plays as a central midfielder.

== Club career ==
Carrillo was born in Alcantarilla, Region of Murcia, and joined Málaga CF's youth setup in 2016, from Real Murcia. In January 2018, he left the former and joined Albacete Balompié, being initially assigned to the reserves in Tercera División.

Carrillo made his senior debut on 24 February 2018, playing the last 17 minutes in a 2–1 home win against La Roda CF. He scored his first goal on 1 May, netting his team's second in a 2–0 home defeat of UD Almansa.

On 18 July 2018, Carrillo agreed to a contract with Segunda División B side FC Cartagena. On 15 January 2020, after featuring rarely, he terminated his link and moved to fellow league team UD Melilla.

On 29 July 2020, Carrillo signed a two-year deal with Segunda División newcomers CD Castellón. He made his professional debut on 24 October, coming on as a late substitute for Gus Ledes in a 0–1 home loss against Girona FC.

On 26 January 2021, after featuring rarely, Carrillo was loaned to Real Murcia in the third division for the remainder of the season.
