= 2020–21 Segunda División =

90th season of the second-tier football league in Spain

Segunda División
- Season: 2020–21
- Dates: 12 September 2020 – 31 May 2021
- Champions: Espanyol
- Promoted: Espanyol; Mallorca; Rayo Vallecano
- Relegated: Albacete; Castellón; Sabadell; UD Logroñés
- Matches: 462
- Goals: 946 (2.05 per match)
- Top goalscorer: Raúl de Tomás (23 goals)
- Biggest home win: Las Palmas 6–1 Lugo (1 April 2021)
- Biggest away win: Zaragoza 0–5 Leganés (30 May 2021)
- Highest scoring: Las Palmas 6–1 Lugo (1 April 2021)
- Longest winning run: Girona (7 matches)
- Longest unbeaten run: Mallorca (17 matches)
- Longest winless run: Lugo (16 matches)
- Longest losing run: Alcorcón (7 matches)

The 2020–21 Segunda División season, also known as LaLiga SmartBank for sponsorship reasons, was the 90th since its establishment. The season began on 12 September 2020 and concluded on 31 May 2021.

== Teams ==
=== Promotion and relegation (pre-season) ===
A total of 22 teams contested the league, including 15 sides retained from the 2019–20 season, three relegated from the 2019–20 La Liga, and four promoted from the 2019–20 Segunda División B. This included the winners of the play-offs.

Teams promoted to La Liga

On 12 July 2020, Cádiz became the first team to be promoted to La Liga, ending a 14-year run in the lower divisions, seven of which were spent in Segunda División B, following Oviedo's 1−0 win against Zaragoza. The second team to earn promotion was Huesca after their 3−0 win against Numancia on 17 July 2020. This marked an immediate return to the La Liga. The final team to achieve promotion were play-off winners Elche after defeating Girona 1−0 on aggregate, they return to La Liga after a five-year absence, with one of those seasons spent in Segunda División B.

Teams relegated from La Liga

The first team to be relegated from La Liga were Espanyol. They were relegated on 8 July 2020, after a 1−0 loss against Barcelona in the Derbi Barceloní, after a 26-year stay in the top tier. The second team to be relegated were Mallorca, who were relegated on 16 July 2020 after a 1−2 home defeat against Granada, suffering an immediate return to the second division. The third and final relegated club were Leganés, after a 2−2 draw against Real Madrid on 19 July 2020, ending their four-year stay in La Liga.

Teams relegated to Segunda División B

The first team to be relegated from Segunda División were Racing Santander, after a 1−2 home loss against Elche on 4 July 2020, suffering an immediate return to the Segunda División B. The second team to be relegated were Extremadura, who were relegated on 4 July 2020 after trailing to Numancia 1−0 at home, ending a two-year stay in the second division. On 20 July 2020, the final round of the 2019–20 season, Numancia and Deportivo de La Coruña were relegated after Albacete won 1–0 away to Cádiz. This ended Deportivo's 39-year streak in professional football, spending 25 of those seasons in La Liga, and also ended Numancia's 23-year stay in professional football, spending 4 of those seasons in La Liga.

Teams promoted from Segunda División B

Following the play-offs, the first team to achieve promotion were UD Logroñés after defeating Castellón on penalties on 18 July 2020. They were set to play in the Segunda División for the first time in their history, and to bring back professional football to La Rioja 20 years after the relegation of former CD Logroñés. The second team to earn promotion were Cartagena on 19 July 2020 after beating Atlético Baleares on penalties as well, they return to Segunda after eight years. Sabadell and Castellón were the last teams to get promoted on 26 July 2020 after defeating Barcelona B and Cornellà in their respective playoff matches. Sabadell return to the division after a five-year absence whereas Castellón return after ten years.

=== Stadiums and locations ===
Location of teams in 2020–21 Segunda División
Location of Community of Madrid teams in 2020–21 Segunda División
Location of teams in 2020–21 Segunda División (Canary Islands)

Mallorca signed a sponsorship contract with Consell de Mallorca and other public entities for renaming their stadium as the Visit Mallorca Stadium.

Team	Location	Stadium	Capacity
Albacete	Albacete	Carlos Belmonte	17,524
Alcorcón	Alcorcón	Santo Domingo	5,100
Almería	Almería	Juegos Mediterráneos	15,000
Cartagena	Cartagena	Cartagonova	15,105
Castellón	Castellón de la Plana	Castalia	15,500
Espanyol	Barcelona	RCDE Stadium	40,000
Fuenlabrada	Fuenlabrada	Fernando Torres	5,400
Girona	Girona	Montilivi	11,200
Las Palmas	Las Palmas	Gran Canaria	31,250
Leganés	Leganés	Butarque	12,450
Lugo	Lugo	Anxo Carro	7,070
Málaga	Málaga	La Rosaleda	30,044
Mallorca	Palma	Visit Mallorca Stadium	24,262
Mirandés	Miranda de Ebro	Anduva	5,759
Oviedo	Oviedo	Carlos Tartiere	30,500
Rayo Vallecano	Madrid	Vallecas	14,708
Ponferradina	Ponferrada	El Toralín	8,400
Sabadell	Sabadell	Nova Creu Alta	11,908
Sporting Gijón	Gijón	El Molinón	30,000
Tenerife	Santa Cruz de Tenerife	Heliodoro Rodríguez López	22,824
UD Logroñés	Logroño	Las Gaunas	16,000
Zaragoza	Zaragoza	La Romareda	33,608

=== Personnel and sponsorship ===
Team	Manager	Captain	Kit manufacturer	Shirt main sponsor
Albacete	(Spain) Francisco Noguerol (interim)	(Spain) Tomeu Nadal	Hummel	Extrual
Alcorcón	(Spain) Juan Antonio Anquela	(Spain) Laure	Kappa	Kaizen Patrimonio
Almería	(Spain) Rubi	(Spain) Fernando	Puma	Arabian Centres
Cartagena	(Spain) Luis Carrión	(Spain) David Andújar	Adidas	Talasur Group
Castellón	(Spain) Sergio Escobar	(Spain) David Cubillas	Hummel	Bravoplaya
Espanyol	(Spain) Vicente Moreno	(Spain) David López	Kelme	Betway
Fuenlabrada	(Spain) José Luis Oltra	(Spain) Juanma Marrero	Joma	Deliave
Girona	(Spain) Francisco	(Spain) Álex Granell	Puma	
Las Palmas	(Spain) Pepe Mel	(Spain) Aythami Artiles	Hummel	Gran Canaria
Leganés	(Spain) Asier Garitano	(Spain) Unai Bustinza	Joma	Betway
Lugo	(Spain) Rubén Albés	(Spain) Carlos Pita	Kappa	Estrella Galicia 0,0
Málaga	(Spain) Sergio Pellicer	(Spain) Ismael Casas	Nike	Tesesa
Mallorca	(Spain) Luis García	(Spain) Manolo Reina	Umbro	Betfred
Mirandés	(Spain) José Alberto	(Spain) Limones	Adidas	Miranda Empresas
Oviedo	(Spain) José Ángel Ziganda	(Spain) Bolaño	Adidas	Natural Mining Resources
Ponferradina	(Spain) Bolo	(Brazil) Yuri	Adidas	Herrero Brigantina
Rayo Vallecano	(Spain) Andoni Iraola	(Argentina) Óscar Trejo	Umbro	DIGI
Sabadell	(Spain) Antonio Hidalgo	(Spain) Ángel Martínez	Hummel	
Sporting Gijón	(Spain) David Gallego	(Spain) Carlos Carmona	Nike	Integra Energía, William Hill, Alimerka, Telecable, Nissan
Tenerife	(Spain) Luis Miguel Ramis	(Spain) Suso	Hummel	Turismo Tenerife
UD Logroñés	(Spain) Sergio Rodríguez	(Spain) Iñaki Sáenz	Umbro	NaturHouse
Zaragoza	(Spain) Juan Ignacio Martínez	(Spain) Alberto Zapater	Adidas	Caravan Fragancias

=== Managerial changes ===
Team	Outgoing manager	Manner of departure	Date of vacancy	Position in table	Incoming manager	Date of appointment
Leganés	(Mexico) Javier Aguirre	Mutual consent	20 July 2020	Pre-season	(Spain) José Luis Martí	3 August 2020
Espanyol	(Spain) Francisco Rufete	End of interim spell	20 July 2020	Pre-season	(Spain) Vicente Moreno	4 August 2020
Tenerife	(Spain) Rubén Baraja	End of contract	21 July 2020	Pre-season	(Spain) Fran Fernández	29 July 2020
Sporting Gijón	(Serbia) Miroslav Đukić	End of contract	21 July 2020	Pre-season	(Spain) David Gallego	21 July 2020
Alcorcón	(Spain) Fran Fernández	End of contract	21 July 2020	Pre-season	(Spain) Mere	26 July 2020
Mirandés	(Spain) Andoni Iraola	End of contract	21 July 2020	Pre-season	(Spain) José Alberto	27 July 2020
Rayo Vallecano	(Spain) Paco Jémez	End of contract	21 July 2020	Pre-season	(Spain) Andoni Iraola	6 August 2020
Mallorca	(Spain) Vicente Moreno	Signed for Espanyol	4 August 2020	Pre-season	(Spain) Luis García	6 August 2020
Zaragoza	(Spain) Víctor Fernández	Resigned	18 August 2020	Pre-season	(Spain) Rubén Baraja	20 August 2020
Lugo	(Spain) Juanfran	Sacked	11 October 2020	20th	(Tunisia) Mehdi Nafti	14 October 2020
Albacete	(Spain) Lucas Alcaraz	Sacked	13 October 2020	21st	(Spain) Aritz López Garai	14 October 2020
Alcorcón	(Spain) Mere	Sacked	9 November 2020	22nd	(Spain) Juan Antonio Anquela	9 November 2020
Zaragoza	(Spain) Rubén Baraja	Sacked	9 November 2020	18th	(Spain) Iván Martínez	11 November 2020
Tenerife	(Spain) Fran Fernández	Sacked	22 November 2020	17th	(Spain) Luis Miguel Ramis	24 November 2020
Albacete	(Spain) Aritz López Garai	Sacked	6 December 2020	22nd	(Spain) Alejandro Menéndez	8 December 2020
Zaragoza	(Spain) Iván Martínez	Demoted to Deportivo Aragón	13 December 2020	21st	(Spain) Juan Ignacio Martínez	14 December 2020
Cartagena	(Spain) Borja Jiménez	Sacked	18 December 2020	16th	(Spain) Pepe Aguilar	22 December 2020
Cartagena	(Spain) Pepe Aguilar	Demoted to Cartagena B	11 January 2021	18th	(Spain) Luis Carrión	12 January 2021
Castellón	(Spain) Óscar Cano	Mutual consent	11 January 2021	21st	(Spain) Juan Carlos Garrido	12 January 2021
Leganés	(Spain) José Luis Martí	Sacked	26 January 2021	6th	(Spain) Asier Garitano	27 January 2021
Fuenlabrada	(Spain) José Ramón Sandoval	Sacked	2 February 2021	13th	(Spain) José Luis Oltra	3 February 2021
Lugo	(Tunisia) Mehdi Nafti	Sacked	28 February 2021	15th	(Spain) Luis César Sampedro	2 March 2021
Lugo	(Spain) Luis César Sampedro	Sacked	19 April 2021	20th	(Spain) Rubén Albés	20 April 2021
Almería	(Portugal) José Gomes	Mutual consent	27 April 2021	3rd	(Spain) Rubi	28 April 2021
Albacete	(Spain) Alejandro Menéndez	Sacked	4 May 2021	22nd	(Spain) Francisco Noguerol (interim)	4 May 2021
Castellón	(Spain) Juan Carlos Garrido	Sacked	21 May 2021	20th	(Spain) Sergio Escobar	22 May 2021

== League table ==
=== Standings ===
At the end of the season, all three relegated teams in the previous season's La Liga (Leganés, Mallorca and Espanyol) took the top three places in the league.

Pos	Team	Pld	W	D	L	GF	GA	GD	Pts	Promotion, qualification or relegation
1	Espanyol (C, P)	42	24	10	8	71	28	+43	82 (Note: Head-to-head points: Espanyol: 4, Mallorca: 1)	Promotion to La Liga
2	Mallorca (P)	42	24	10	8	54	28	+26	82	Promotion to La Liga
3	Leganés	42	21	10	11	51	32	+19	73 (Note: Head-to-head points: Leganés: 4, Almería: 1)	Qualification for promotion play-offs
4	Almería	42	21	10	11	61	40	+21	73	Qualification for promotion play-offs
5	Girona	42	20	11	11	47	36	+11	71	Qualification for promotion play-offs
6	Rayo Vallecano (O, P)	42	19	10	13	52	40	+12	67	Qualification for promotion play-offs
7	Sporting Gijón	42	17	14	11	37	28	+9	65	
8	Ponferradina	42	15	12	15	45	50	−5	57	
9	Las Palmas	42	14	14	14	46	53	−7	56	
10	Mirandés	42	14	12	16	38	41	−3	54 (Note: Head-to-head points: Mirandés: 6, Fuenlabrada: 0)	
11	Fuenlabrada	42	12	18	12	45	46	−1	54	
12	Málaga	42	14	11	17	37	47	−10	53	
13	Oviedo	42	11	19	12	45	46	−1	52 (Note: Head-to-head points: Oviedo: 4, Tenerife: 1)	
14	Tenerife	42	13	13	16	36	36	0	52	
15	Zaragoza	42	13	11	18	37	43	−6	50	
16	Cartagena	42	12	13	17	44	52	−8	49	
17	Alcorcón	42	13	9	20	32	42	−10	48	
18	Lugo	42	11	14	17	38	53	−15	47	
19	Sabadell (R)	42	11	13	18	40	48	−8	46	Relegation to Primera División RFEF
20	UD Logroñés (R)	42	11	11	20	28	53	−25	44	Relegation to Primera División RFEF
21	Castellón (R)	42	11	8	23	35	54	−19	41	Relegation to Primera División RFEF
22	Albacete (R)	42	9	11	22	30	53	−23	38	Relegation to Primera División RFEF

Source: LaLiga
Rules for classification: 1) points; 2) head-to-head points; 3) head-to-head goal difference; 4) goal difference; 5) number of goals scored
(C) Champions; (O) Play-off winners; (P) Promoted; (R) Relegated

=== Results ===
Home \ Away	ALB	ALC	ALM	CAR	CAS	ESP	FUE	GIR	LPA	LEG	LUG	MGA	MLL	MIR	OVI	PON	RAY	SAB	SPO	TFE	LOG	ZAR
Albacete	—	0–1	1–2	2–0	0–1	0–3	1–2	0–2	1–1	0–0	1–1	1–1	0–1	1–0	1–1	0–2	2–1	3–0	0–1	0–2	1–1	1–0
Alcorcón	1–2	—	0–1	2–1	2–1	1–0	0–3	1–0	0–0	1–2	1–0	0–1	0–2	4–0	1–1	0–1	0–3	2–0	1–2	2–0	1–0	0–3 (Note: Match awarded to Zaragoza after Alcorcón exceeded the number of players allowed from their reserve squad. The match originally ended 0–0.)
Almería	1–1	0–0	—	1–1	3–1	1–1	3–0	0–0	3–1	1–1	4–1	3–1	0–1	2–1	2–2	3–1	0–1	2–2	0–1	2–0	2–1	1–0
Cartagena	3–1	2–1	3–2	—	1–0	1–3	1–1	1–1	3–0	1–0	2–1	1–1	1–2	0–2	2–0	1–1	2–2	1–2	0–1	0–0	0–1	1–1
Castellón	3–0	0–2	1–2	2–1	—	1–3	1–2	0–1	4–0	2–0	0–1	0–1	1–0	0–1	1–0	0–2	0–2	2–1	2–0	0–1	0–0	1–0
Espanyol	3–0	1–0	2–1	0–2	2–0	—	4–0	1–2	4–0	2–1	2–1	3–0	0–0	2–0	1–1	2–0	2–3	1–0	2–0	1–1	4–0	2–0
Fuenlabrada	1–0	0–0	1–1	2–1	1–1	1–1	—	1–1	1–2	0–0	2–0	0–2	4–1	0–1	2–2	1–1	1–2	2–2	0–0	1–1	0–0	0–1
Girona	2–1	1–0	0–1	2–1	2–1	1–0	0–1	—	1–1	0–2	1–1	0–1	0–1	1–0	1–0	3–1	0–0	0–0	1–0	1–0	2–0	3–0
Las Palmas	3–2	0–0	2–0	2–0	2–1	1–0	3–3	1–2	—	2–1	6–1	1–1	1–1	0–2	1–2	2–0	1–1	0–1	3–2	1–0	2–1	0–2
Leganés	3–1	1–0	2–1	3–1	0–0	2–0	0–2	0–1	1–0	—	3–2	1–0	0–1	1–0	2–1	1–1	1–0	2–1	0–0	1–0	3–0	1–0
Lugo	1–0	1–3	0–2	2–1	0–0	1–1	0–0	3–0	1–1	2–1	—	0–1	0–1	2–1	0–0	1–0	1–0	0–1	0–0	2–0	1–1	2–2
Málaga	2–0	1–0	0–3	1–2	3–0	0–3	0–1	0–1	0–0	1–2	2–2	—	1–1	1–1	1–1	0–2	2–0	2–0	1–0	1–1	0–0	1–2
Mallorca	0–0	2–0	2–0	2–1	3–1	1–2	2–3	1–0	0–1	1–0	2–0	3–1	—	2–1	0–0	3–0	0–1	1–0	0–0	2–0	4–0	2–1
Mirandés	0–2	0–0	1–1	4–1	1–1	2–2	2–1	3–3	2–0	0–0	0–0	1–0	0–0	—	1–1	0–1	0–2	0–2	1–0	0–0	0–1	1–0
Oviedo	0–1	1–1	1–2	0–0	4–0	0–2	1–1	0–1	0–0	1–3	3–1	1–0	2–2	1–1	—	1–1	0–0	2–1	1–0	4–2	2–3	1–0
Ponferradina	0–1	2–0	2–1	0–2	1–2	1–4	0–0	1–1	0–0	3–2	2–0	1–1	2–2	1–0	1–0	—	3–0	0–3	2–2	1–0	2–2	2–1
Rayo Vallecano	2–2	2–1	0–1	0–0	2–1	1–0	2–0	2–1	2–0	1–1	0–1	4–0	1–3	0–1	4–1	1–1	—	2–1	0–1	0–1	2–1	3–2
Sabadell	0–0	1–1	1–2	1–1	1–1	0–1	1–2	2–2	3–1	1–0	1–1	1–2	1–0	0–2	0–1	2–0	2–0	—	1–1	0–2	0–0	1–1
Sporting Gijón	0–0	0–0	0–2	0–0	1–0	1–1	2–1	2–0	1–0	1–1	1–0	1–0	2–0	1–2	0–1	2–1	1–1	3–1	—	1–1	1–0	1–0
Tenerife	2–0	3–1	0–1	3–0	1–1	0–0	1–1	2–0	1–1	0–0	1–1	2–0	0–1	1–2	2–2	1–0	1–0	1–2	1–0	—	0–1	1–0
UD Logroñés	2–0	1–0	1–0	0–1	1–1	0–3	1–0	1–4	0–1	0–1	2–3	0–1	0–1	2–1	0–0	1–2	0–0	1–0	0–4	1–0	—	1–1
Zaragoza	1–0	0–1	2–1	0–0	3–0	0–0	1–0	2–2	2–2	0–5	1–0	1–2	0–0	1–0	1–2	1–0	1–2	0–0	0–0	1–0	2–0	—

Updated to match(es) played on 30 May 2021. Source: LaLiga
Legend: Blue = home team win; Yellow = draw; Red = away team win.

=== Positions by round ===
The table lists the positions of teams after each week of matches. In order to preserve chronological evolvements, any postponed matches are not included to the round at which they were originally scheduled, but added to the full round they were played immediately afterwards.

Team ╲ Round	1	2	3	4	5	6	7	8	9	10	11	12	13	14	15	16	17	18	19	20	21	22	23	24	25	26	27	28	29	30	31	32	33	34	35	36	37	38	39	40	41	42
Espanyol	1	3	2	2	1	1	1	1	1	1	1	1	1	3	2	2	2	2	1	1	1	1	2	2	2	2	2	3	3	2	1	1	1	1	1	1	1	1	1	1	1	1
Mallorca	18	16	11	7	4	5	8	3	3	3	2	2	2	1	1	1	1	1	2	2	2	2	1	1	1	1	1	1	1	1	2	2	2	2	2	2	2	2	2	2	2	2
Leganés	5	8	5	8	13	10	9	4	5	4	4	4	3	2	4	3	4	4	4	5	6	6	5	6	4	4	4	4	4	4	4	5	4	4	4	4	4	4	4	3	3	3
Almería	12	17	12	15	18	21	20	18	14	9	5	5	5	5	3	4	3	3	3	3	3	3	3	3	3	3	3	2	2	3	3	3	3	3	3	3	3	3	3	4	4	4
Girona	13	18	21	22	19	15	17	13	13	11	12	16	12	14	15	14	7	7	8	8	8	8	9	9	9	8	9	9	11	8	8	8	7	7	7	7	6	6	5	5	5	5
Rayo Vallecano	6	1	7	5	6	4	3	6	4	5	8	9	6	6	6	8	6	6	6	4	4	4	4	5	6	6	6	6	6	6	6	6	6	6	6	6	7	7	7	7	6	6
Sporting Gijón	7	2	1	1	2	2	4	2	2	2	3	3	4	4	5	5	5	5	5	6	5	5	6	4	5	5	5	5	5	5	5	4	5	5	5	5	5	5	6	6	7	7
Ponferradina	16	6	4	4	5	7	6	9	12	8	13	14	11	12	10	6	8	9	7	7	7	7	7	7	8	7	7	7	7	7	7	7	8	8	8	8	8	8	8	8	8	8
Las Palmas	17	14	15	10	12	8	7	10	8	14	15	11	15	15	13	13	15	14	15	15	9	9	10	11	13	10	13	14	12	13	13	9	11	10	11	13	12	10	13	14	10	9
Mirandés	10	12	8	11	8	9	11	12	7	13	9	13	8	8	7	9	10	8	9	9	13	11	8	8	7	9	8	8	8	9	12	13	10	12	10	9	10	9	9	9	9	10
Fuenlabrada	2	4	3	3	3	3	2	7	10	10	6	7	9	10	8	10	11	13	10	10	14	13	13	13	10	11	12	12	14	12	9	10	12	13	13	12	9	12	12	13	13	11
Málaga	21	11	6	9	11	6	5	5	6	12	7	8	13	9	11	7	9	12	12	13	11	15	12	12	15	12	14	10	9	10	10	11	9	9	9	10	11	11	14	15	15	12
Oviedo	11	13	16	16	14	16	15	19	20	17	16	12	14	13	14	15	14	11	13	14	12	12	15	16	14	15	11	11	13	14	14	14	14	15	14	14	14	13	10	12	12	13
Tenerife	3	9	13	17	15	14	16	17	16	18	17	17	17	17	17	17	17	19	16	16	16	16	16	14	11	14	10	13	10	11	11	12	13	11	12	11	13	14	11	11	11	14
Zaragoza	15	19	17	12	9	13	14	14	17	16	18	19	19	19	20	22	21	21	21	21	17	20	18	17	17	17	18	17	17	16	16	16	15	14	15	15	15	15	15	10	14	15
Cartagena	9	15	19	13	10	12	10	8	11	7	11	15	16	16	16	16	16	16	17	17	19	21	21	19	19	20	17	19	20	20	21	21	19	19	19	18	20	16	16	16	16	16
Alcorcón	8	5	9	14	17	19	21	21	21	22	22	22	22	22	18	19	18	20	19	20	20	22	22	22	21	19	20	18	18	19	19	20	21	20	18	19	16	17	17	17	17	17
Lugo	20	10	14	18	20	17	12	11	9	6	10	6	10	11	12	12	12	10	11	11	10	10	11	10	12	13	15	15	15	15	15	15	17	17	20	21	21	21	21	19	18	18
Sabadell	14	20	20	21	22	22	22	22	22	21	21	21	20	20	21	20	20	18	20	18	18	18	19	18	18	18	19	20	21	22	18	19	20	21	21	20	19	20	20	21	20	19
UD Logroñés	19	21	18	19	16	18	18	20	19	15	14	10	7	7	9	11	13	15	14	12	15	14	14	15	16	16	16	16	16	17	17	18	18	16	16	17	17	19	19	18	19	20
Castellón	4	7	10	6	7	11	13	15	18	20	20	18	18	18	19	18	19	17	18	19	21	17	20	21	22	22	21	21	19	18	20	17	16	18	17	16	18	18	18	20	21	21
Albacete	22	22	22	20	21	20	19	16	15	19	19	20	21	21	22	21	22	22	22	22	22	19	17	20	20	21	22	22	22	21	22	22	22	22	22	22	22	22	22	22	22	22

Promotion to La Liga
Qualification to promotion play-offs
Relegation to Primera División RFEF

Source: BDFútbol

== Promotion play-offs ==
Semi–finals
6	Rayo Vallecano	3	2	5
3	Leganés	0	1	1
5	Girona	3	0	3
4	Almería	0	0	0

Final
6	Rayo Vallecano	1	2	3
5	Girona	2	0	2

== Season statistics ==
=== Top goalscorers ===
Rank	Player	Club	Goals
1	(Spain) Raúl de Tomás	Espanyol	23
2	(Serbia) Uroš Đurđević	Sporting Gijón	22
3	(Nigeria) Umar Sadiq	Almería	20
4	(Spain) Rubén Castro	Cartagena	19
5	(Spain) Manu Barreiro	Lugo	12
5	(Spain) José Corpas	Almería	12
5	(Spain) Javi Puado	Espanyol	12
8	(Argentina) Sergio Araujo	Las Palmas	11
8	(Spain) Stoichkov	Sabadell	11
8	(Brazil) Yuri	Ponferradina	11

=== Top assists ===
Rank	Player	Club	Assists
1	(Spain) Adri Embarba	Espanyol	14
2	(Spain) Álvaro García	Rayo Vallecano	9
3	(Spain) Marc Mateu	Castellón	8
3	(Spain) Javi Puado	Espanyol	8
5	(Argentina) Pablo de Blasis	Cartagena	7
5	(Spain) José Lazo	Almería	7
7	(France) Pierre Cornud	Sabadell	6
7	(Spain) Pedro Díaz	Sporting Gijón	6
7	(Spain) Álex Gallar	Cartagena	6
7	(Spain) Gerard Gumbau	Girona	6
7	(Spain) Iván Martín	Mirandés	6
7	(Spain) Sergio Ruiz	Las Palmas	6

=== Zamora Trophy ===
The Zamora Trophy is awarded by newspaper MARCA to the goalkeeper with the lowest goals-to-games ratio. A goalkeeper has to have played at least 28 games of 60 or more minutes to be eligible for the trophy.

Rank	Player	Club	Goals against	Matches	Average
1	(Spain) Diego López	Espanyol	25	40	0.63
2	(Spain) Diego Mariño	Sporting Gijón	25	39	0.64
2	(Spain) Manolo Reina	Mallorca	25	39	0.64
4	(Spain) Juan Carlos	Girona	33	40	0.83
5	(Argentina) Cristian Álvarez	Zaragoza	32	37	0.86

=== Hat-tricks ===
Player	For	Against	Result	Date	Round	Ref.
(Spain) José Corpas	Almería	Fuenlabrada	3–0 (H)	24 October 2020	8	
(Senegal) Sekou Gassama	Fuenlabrada	Alcorcón	3–0 (A)	8 November 2020	11	
(Nigeria) Umar Sadiq	Almería	Ponferradina	3–1 (H)	3 January 2021	20	
(Montenegro) Uroš Đurđević	Sporting Gijón	UD Logroñés	4–0 (A)	6 February 2021	24	
(Spain) Rober	Las Palmas	Lugo	6–1 (H)	1 April 2021	32	
(Spain) Javi Puado	Espanyol	Las Palmas	4–0 (H)	24 April 2021	36	

Note

(H) – Home; (A) – Away

=== Discipline ===
==== Player ====
- Most yellow cards: 17
  - (Spain) Edgar González (Oviedo)
- Most red cards: 4
  - (Senegal) Pathé Ciss (Fuenlabrada)

==== Team ====
- Most yellow cards: 117
  - Almería
- Most red cards: 12
  - Girona
- Fewest yellow cards: 70
  - Alcorcón
- Fewest red cards: 1
  - Mirandés

== Awards ==
=== Monthly ===
Month	Player of the Month		Reference
Month	Player	Club	Reference
September	(Montenegro) Uroš Đurđević	Sporting Gijón	
October	(Spain) Manolo Reina	Mallorca	
November	(Colombia) Leonardo Acevedo	UD Logroñés	
December	(Spain) Raúl de Tomás	Espanyol	
January	(Nigeria) Umar Sadiq	Almería	
February	(Spain) Rubén Pardo	Leganés	
March	(Spain) Adri Embarba	Espanyol	
April	(Spain) Javi Puado	Espanyol	
May	(Spain) Abdón	Mallorca	

== Number of teams by region ==
Position	Region	Number	Teams
1	Community of Madrid	4	Alcorcón, Fuenlabrada, Leganés, Rayo Vallecano
2	Catalonia	3	Espanyol, Girona, Sabadell
3	Andalusia	2	Almería, Málaga
3	Asturias	2	Oviedo, Sporting Gijón
3	Canary Islands	2	Las Palmas, Tenerife
3	Castile and León	2	Mirandés, Ponferradina
7	Aragon	1	Zaragoza
7	Balearic Islands	1	Mallorca
7	Castile-La Mancha	1	Albacete
7	Galicia	1	Lugo
7	La Rioja	1	UD Logroñés
7	Murcia	1	Cartagena
7	Valencian Community	1	Castellón
