= 2019–20 SD Ponferradina season =

SD Ponferradina
2019–20 season
- President: José Fernández Nieto
- Head coach: Bolo
- Stadium: El Toralín
- Segunda División: 18th
- Copa del Rey: Second round
- Top goalscorer: League: Yuri (18); All: Yuri (18)
Home colours	Away colours	Third colours

The 2019–20 SD Ponferradina season was the club's 98th season in existence and its first season back in the second division of Spanish football. In addition to the domestic league, SD Ponferradina participated in this season's edition of the Copa del Rey. The season was slated to cover a period from 1 July 2019 to 30 June 2020. It was extended extraordinarily beyond 30 June due to the COVID-19 pandemic in Spain.

== Players ==
=== First-team squad ===
As of 20 February 2020

Note: Flags indicate national team as defined under FIFA eligibility rules; some limited exceptions apply. Players may hold more than one non-FIFA nationality.

No.	Pos.	Nation	Player
1	GK	ARG	Gianfranco Gazzaniga
2	DF	ESP	Son
3	DF	ESP	Ríos Reina
4	DF	ESP	Pablo Trigueros
5	DF	ARG	Fabián Noguera (on loan from Santos)
6	MF	ESP	Óscar Sielva
7	FW	ESP	Omar Ramos
8	MF	ESP	Pablo Larrea
9	FW	ESP	Kaxe
10	FW	BRA	Yuri de Souza (captain)
11	FW	ESP	Ivi (on loan from Levante)
12	DF	ESP	Iván Rodríguez (on loan from Málaga)
13	GK	ESP	Manu García

No.	Pos.	Nation	Player
14	DF	ESP	Luis Valcarce
15	MF	ESP	Nacho Gil
16	MF	ESP	Fran Manzanara (on loan from Levante)
18	FW	ESP	Asier Benito (on loan from Eibar)
20	MF	ESP	Pablo Valcarce (on loan from Mallorca)
22	DF	ARG	Franco Russo (on loan from Mallorca)
23	MF	ESP	Saúl Crespo
24	MF	ESP	Francesc Fullana
25	GK	ESP	René Román (on loan from Almería)
26	MF	ESP	Javi Navarro (on loan from Cádiz)
28	DF	URU	Maxi Villa (on loan from Girona)
—	DF	SEN	Aya Diouf

=== Out on loan ===
Note: Flags indicate national team as defined under FIFA eligibility rules; some limited exceptions apply. Players may hold more than one non-FIFA nationality.

No.	Pos.	Nation	Player
—	DF	ESP	Jon García (at Racing Ferrol until 30 June 2020)
—	DF	NIG	Yac Magagi (at Getafe B until 30 June 2020)

No.	Pos.	Nation	Player
—	FW	COL	Edward Bolaños (at Alcobendas Sport until 30 June 2020)
—	MF	ESP	Carlos Bravo (at Rayo Majadahonda until 30 June 2020)

== Pre-season and friendlies ==
Win Draw Loss

27 July 2019 Trofeo Emma Cuervo	Ponferradina	1–0	Oviedo	Navia
19:00 CEST (UTC+2)	Javi Mier 89' (o.g.)	Report		Stadium: El Pardo

== Competitions ==
=== Overview ===
Competition	First match	Last match	Starting round	Final position	Record							
Competition	First match	Last match	Starting round	Final position	Pld	W	D	L	GF	GA	GD	Win %
Segunda División	18 August 2019	20 July 2020	Matchday 1	18th	42	12	15	15	45	50	−5	28.57
Copa del Rey	17 December 2019	11 January 2020	First round	Second round	2	1	0	1	1	1	+0	50.00
Total					44	13	15	16	46	51	−5	29.55

Last updated: 20 July 2020
Source: Competitions

=== Segunda División ===
==== League table ====
Pos	Team	Pld	W	D	L	GF	GA	GD	Pts	Promotion, qualification or relegation
16	Lugo	42	12	16	14	43	54	−11	52 (Note: Lugo finished ahead of Albacete on head-to-head points: Albacete 0–1 Lugo, Lugo 1–0 Albacete.)	
17	Albacete	42	13	13	16	36	46	−10	52	
18	Ponferradina	42	12	15	15	45	50	−5	51 (Note: Ponferradina finished ahead of Deportivo La Coruña on head-to-head goal difference: Ponferradina 2–0 Deportivo La Coruña, Deportivo La Coruña 2–1 Ponferradina.)	
19	Deportivo La Coruña (R)	42	12	15	15	43	60	−17	51	Relegation to Segunda División B
20	Numancia (R)	42	13	11	18	45	53	−8	50	Relegation to Segunda División B

Source: LaLiga Soccerway
Rules for classification: 1) points; 2) head-to-head points; 3) head-to-head goal difference; 4) goal difference; 5) number of goals scored
(R) Relegated

==== Results summary ====
Overall								Home						Away					
Pld	W	D	L	GF	GA	GD	Pts	W	D	L	GF	GA	GD	W	D	L	GF	GA	GD
42	12	15	15	45	50	−5	51	9	9	3	26	17	+9	3	6	12	19	33	−14

Last updated: 20 July 2020.
Source: La Liga SmartBank

==== Results by round ====
Round	1	2	3	4	5	6	7	8	9	10	11	12	13	14	15	16	17	18	19	20	21	22	23	24	25	26	27	28	29	30	31	32	33	34	35	36	37	38	39	40	41	42
Ground	A	H	A	H	A	H	A	H	A	H	H	A	H	A	H	A	H	A	H	A	H	A	H	A	H	A	A	H	A	H	H	A	H	A	H	A	H	A	H	A	H	A
Result	L	D	W	D	D	D	W	L	L	W	D	D	W	W	D	D	L	D	L	W	W	D	L	D	L	W	D	D	L	W	L	D	W	W	D	L	L	L	L	L	W	L
Position	19	21	9	9	12	12	8	11	15	11	12	12	8	7	8	9	12	13	14	12	11	11	12	12	13	11	11	12	13	9	11	12	11	9	8	12	13	14	15	16	16	18

Updated to match(es) played on 20 July 2020. Source: La Liga SmartBank
A = Away; H = Home; W = Win; D = Draw; L = Loss

==== Matches ====
The fixtures were revealed on 4 July 2019.

18 August 2019 1	Cádiz	3–1	Ponferradina	Cádiz
20:00 CEST (UTC+2)	Navarro 55'; Perea 76'; Nano 86'	Report	Trigueros 46'	Stadium: Ramón de Carranza; Attendance: 15,009; Referee: Álvaro Moreno Aragón

25 August 2019 2	Ponferradina	1–1	Zaragoza	Ponferrada
18:00 CEST (UTC+2)	Sielva (yellow card) 63'; Valcarce (yellow card) 84', (goal) 86'	Report	Kagawa 59'; Grippo (yellow card) 74'	Stadium: El Toralín; Attendance: 5,684; Referee: Javier Iglesias Villanueva

1 September 2019 3	Ponferradina	4–0	Tenerife	Ponferrada
20:00 CEST (UTC+2)				Stadium: Estadio El Toralín

7 September 2019 4	Fuenlabrada	1–1	Ponferradina	Fuenlabrada
20:00 CEST (UTC+2)				Stadium: Fernando Torres

14 September 2019 5	Ponferradina	1–1	Alcorcón	Ponferrada
20:30 CEST (UTC+2)				Stadium: Estadio El Toralín

18 September 2019 6	Lugo	2–2	Ponferradina	Lugo
19:00 CEST (UTC+2)				Stadium: Anxo Carro

22 September 2019 7	Ponferradina	2–1	Oviedo	Ponferrada
12:00 CEST (UTC+2)				Stadium: Estadio El Toralín

28 September 2019 8	Elche	1–0	Ponferradina	Elche
20:00 CEST (UTC+2)				Stadium: Martínez Valero

2 October 2019 9	Ponferradina	0–2	Las Palmas	Ponferrada
21:00 CEST (UTC+2)				Stadium: Estadio El Toralín

5 October 2019 10	Ponferradina	2–0	Mirandés	Ponferrada
20:00 CEST (UTC+2)				Stadium: El Toralín

12 October 2019 11	Extremadura	1–1	Ponferradina	Almendralejo
18:00 CEST (UTC+2)				Stadium: Ciudad de Almendralejo

19 October 2019 12	Ponferradina	1–1	Numancia	Ponferrada
16:00 CEST (UTC+2)				Stadium: Estadio El Toralín

26 October 2019 13	Rayo Vallecano	1–3	Ponferradina	Madrid
16:00 CEST (UTC+2)				Stadium: Vallecas

1 November 2019 14	Ponferradina	1–0	Málaga	Ponferrada
18:30 CET (UTC+1)				Stadium: Estadio El Toralín

10 November 2019 15	Racing Santander	2–2	Ponferradina	Santander
18:00 CET (UTC+1)	Cejudo 57'; Marong 90'	Report	Isi 67'; Yuri 84' (pen.)	Stadium: El Sardinero; Attendance: 11,731; Referee: Víctor Areces Franco

17 November 2019 16	Ponferradina	1–1	Girona	Ponferrada
12:00 CET (UTC+1)				Stadium: Estadio El Toralín

23 November 2019 17	Huesca	2–0	Ponferradina	Huesca
20:00 CET (UTC+1)				Stadium: El Alcoraz

30 November 2019 18	Ponferradina	1–1	Albacete	Ponferrada
18:00 CET (UTC+1)				Stadium: Estadio El Toralín

7 December 2019 19	Sporting Gijón	1–0	Ponferradina	Gijón
18:00 CET (UTC+1)				Stadium: El Molinón

14 December 2019 20	Ponferradina	2–0	Deportivo La Coruña	Ponferrada
18:00 CET (UTC+1)				Stadium: Estadio El Toralín

22 December 2019 21	Almería	2–3	Ponferradina	Almería
12:00 CET (UTC+1)				Stadium: Juegos Mediterráneos

4 January 2020 22	Ponferradina	0–0	Cádiz	Ponferrada
16:00 CET (UTC+1)		Report		Stadium: Estadio El Toralín; Attendance: 5,664; Referee: Juan Luis Pulido Santana

14 January 2020 23	Málaga	1–0	Ponferradina	Málaga
20:00 CET (UTC+1)				Stadium: La Rosaleda

18 January 2020 24	Ponferradina	1–1	Rayo Vallecano	Ponferrada
18:15 CET (UTC+1)				Stadium: Estadio El Toralín

26 January 2020 25	Alcorcón	3–1	Ponferradina	Alcorcón
18:15 CET (UTC+1)				Stadium: Santo Domingo

1 February 2020 26	Ponferradina	3–1	Huesca	Ponferrada
18:15 CET (UTC+1)				Stadium: Estadio El Toralín

9 February 2020 27	Albacete	1–1	Ponferradina	Albacete
12:00 CET (UTC+1)				Stadium: Carlos Belmonte

16 February 2020 28	Ponferradina	0–0	Extremadura	Ponferrada
18:15 CET (UTC+1)				Stadium: Estadio El Toralín

22 February 2020 29	Girona	2–0	Ponferradina	Girona
18:15 CET (UTC+1)				Stadium: Montilivi

29 February 2020 30	Ponferradina	1–0	Sporting Gijón	Ponferrada
16:00 CET (UTC+1)				Stadium: Estadio El Toralín

8 March 2020 31	Tenerife	1–0	Ponferradina	Santa Cruz de Tenerife
20:30 CET (UTC+1)				Stadium: Heliodoro Rodríguez López

12 June 2020 32	Oviedo	0–0	Ponferradina	Oviedo
21:45 CEST (UTC+2)				Stadium: Carlos Tartiere

15 June 2020 33	Ponferradina	2–1	Elche	Ponferrada
19:30 CEST (UTC+2)				Stadium: El Toralín

21 June 2020 34	Mirandés	1–2	Ponferradina	Miranda de Ebro
17:00 CEST (UTC+2)				Stadium: Anduva

24 June 2020 35	Ponferradina	1–1	Racing Santander	Ponferrada
21:45 CEST (UTC+2)	Yuri 29'	Report	Nando 9'	Stadium: El Toralín; Attendance: 0 Referee: Víctor Areces Franco

27 June 2020 36	Deportivo La Coruña	2–1	Ponferradina	A Coruña
17:00 CEST (UTC+2)	David Simón (yellow card) 38'; Uche (yellow card) 45+2'; Montero (yellow card) 58'; Trigueros 90+2' (o.g.); Çolak 90+5', (yellow card) 90+5'	Report	Kaxe 59'; Rodríguez (yellow card) 65'	Stadium: Abanca-Riazor; Attendance: 0 Referee: Juan Luis Pulido Santana

1 July 2020 37	Ponferradina	0–3	Fuenlabrada	Ponferrada
21:45 CEST (UTC+2)	Ivi (yellow card) 51'; Valcarce (yellow card) 56'; Sielva (yellow card) 69'	Report	Fernández (yellow card) 34'; Martínez 57'; Nteka 60'; León (yellow card) 64'; Salvador (yellow card) 87'; Ciss 87'	Stadium: El Toralín; Attendance: 0 Referee: Alejandro Muñiz Ruiz

5 July 2020 38	Las Palmas	3–0	Ponferradina	Las Palmas
19:30 CEST (UTC+2)	González (yellow card) 34'; Castro 70' (pen.); Castellano (yellow card) 89'; Narváez 90+1', 90+3'	Report	Gil (yellow card) 23'; Ivi (yellow card) 35'; Rodríguez (yellow card) 61'; Valcarce (yellow card) 80'; Sielva (yellow card) 82'	Stadium: Estadio Gran Canaria; Attendance: 0 Referee: Isidro Díaz de Mera Escuderos

8 July 2020 39	Ponferradina	0–1	Lugo	Ponferrada
21:45 CEST (UTC+2)	Kaxe (yellow card) 45+5'; Sielva (yellow card) 67'	Report	Marcelo (yellow card) 10'; Hacen (yellow card) 32'; Barreiro (yellow card) 36', (goal) 87' (pen.); Canella (yellow card) 44'; Peybernes (yellow card) 76'	Stadium: El Toralín; Attendance: 0 Referee: Víctor Areces Franco

12 July 2020 40	Numancia	1–0	Ponferradina	Soria
19:30 CEST (UTC+2)	Noguera (yellow card) 16'; Sanhaji (yellow card) 43'; Calero (yellow card) 70'; Zlatanović 85'	Report	Manzanara (yellow card) 63'; Yuri (yellow card) 90+3'	Stadium: Los Pajaritos; Attendance: 0 Referee: Iñaki Vicandi Garrido

17 July 2020 41	Ponferradina	2–1	Almería	Ponferrada
21:00 CEST (UTC+2)	Valcarce (yellow card) 10'; Ivi 12', (yellow card) 77'; Larrea (yellow card) 38'; Yuri 64'	Report	Appiah (yellow card) 43'; Núñez 45+4'; Lazo (yellow card) 64'; Enzo (yellow card) 90+6'	Stadium: El Toralín; Attendance: 0 Referee: Miguel Ángel Ortiz Arias

20 July 2020 42	Zaragoza	2–1	Ponferradina	Zaragoza
21:00 CEST (UTC+2)	Clemente (yellow card) 24'; Linares 35'; Blanco 66'	Report	Rodríguez 51'	Stadium: La Romareda; Attendance: 0 Referee: Dámaso Arcediano Monescillo

=== Copa del Rey ===
19 December 2019 First round	Peña Deportiva	0–1 (a.e.t.)	Ponferradina	Santa Eulària des Riu
19:00 CET (UTC+1)		Report	Kaxe 96'	Stadium: Municipal stadium Attendance: 1,000; Referee: Saúl Ais Reig

11 January 2020 Second round	Ebro	1–0 (a.e.t.)	Ponferradina	Zaragoza
16:00 CET (UTC+1)	De Mesa 114'	Report		Stadium: Pedro Sancho; Attendance: 2,500; Referee: Aitor Gorostegui Fernández-Ortega
