= 2021–22 SD Ponferradina season =

SD Ponferradina
2021–22 season
- President: José Fernández Nieto
- Head coach: Bolo
- Stadium: Estadio El Toralín
- Segunda División: 8th
- Copa del Rey: Round of 32
- Top goalscorer: League: Yuri (12); All: Yuri (13)
Home colours	Away colours	Third colours

The 2021–22 season was the 100th season in the existence of SD Ponferradina and the club's third consecutive season in the second division of Spanish football. In addition to the domestic league, Ponferradina participated in this season's edition of the Copa del Rey.

== Players ==
=== First-team squad ===
As of 31 January 2022

Note: Flags indicate national team as defined under FIFA eligibility rules; some limited exceptions apply. Players may hold more than one non-FIFA nationality.

No.	Pos.	Nation	Player
1	GK	IRI	Amir Abedzadeh
2	DF	ESP	Iván Rodríguez
3	DF	ESP	Ríos Reina (vice-captain)
4	DF	ROU	Alex Pașcanu
5	DF	ESP	José María Amo
6	MF	ROU	Paul Anton
7	FW	ESP	Dani Ojeda
8	MF	ESP	Agus Medina
9	FW	ESP	Sergi Enrich
10	FW	BRA	Yuri de Souza (captain)
11	MF	ESP	Cristian Rodríguez
13	GK	COL	Lucho García
14	DF	ESP	Ricard Pujol

No.	Pos.	Nation	Player
15	DF	ESP	Adri Castellano
16	MF	ESP	Miguel Baeza (on loan from Celta)
18	MF	ESP	Erik Morán
19	FW	ESP	Edu Espiau
20	FW	ESP	José Naranjo
21	FW	ESP	Juan Hernández
22	DF	ESP	Paris Adot
23	MF	ESP	Saúl Crespo
24	MF	ESP	Kuki Zalazar
27	DF	ESP	José Copete
28	MF	ECU	Kike Saverio (on loan from Osasuna)
35	GK	ESP	Sergi Puig

=== Reserve team ===
Note: Flags indicate national team as defined under FIFA eligibility rules; some limited exceptions apply. Players may hold more than one non-FIFA nationality.

No.	Pos.	Nation	Player
29	FW	ESP	Mauro Molina
30	FW	ESP	Hugo Fernández

No.	Pos.	Nation	Player
32	MF	ESP	Alberto Martínez
38	MF	ARM	Anthony Kazaryan

=== Out on loan ===
Note: Flags indicate national team as defined under FIFA eligibility rules; some limited exceptions apply. Players may hold more than one non-FIFA nationality.

No.	Pos.	Nation	Player
—	FW	ESP	Dani Romera (at Gimnàstic until 30 June 2022)
—	FW	ESP	Kaxe (at Sabadell until 30 June 2022)

== Pre-season and friendlies ==
Win Draw Loss

31 July 2021 Friendly	Sporting Gijón	1–0	Ponferradina	Gijón, Spain
18:30 CEST (UTC+2)				Stadium: Escuela de Fútbol de Mareo

4 August 2021 Friendly	Zamora	0–3	Ponferradina	Zamora
20:00 CEST (UTC+2)				Stadium: Estadio Ruta de la Plata

7 August 2021 Friendly	Ponferradina	1–0	Oviedo	Ponferrada
19:00 CEST (UTC+2)	Espiau 87'			Stadium: El Toralín

8 August 2021 Friendly	Deportivo La Coruña	1–2	Ponferradina	A Coruña
20:00 CEST (UTC+2)				Stadium: Abanca-Riazor

== Competitions ==
=== Overall record ===
Competition	First match	Last match	Starting round	Final position	Record							
Competition	First match	Last match	Starting round	Final position	Pld	W	D	L	GF	GA	GD	Win %
Segunda División	14 August 2021	29 May 2022	Matchday 1	8th	42	17	12	13	57	55	+2	40.48
Copa del Rey	1 December 2021	4 January 2022	First round	Round of 32	3	2	1	0	5	3	+2	66.67
Total					45	19	13	13	62	58	+4	42.22

Source: Soccerway

=== Segunda División ===
==== League table ====
Pos	Team	Pld	W	D	L	GF	GA	GD	Pts	Qualification or relegation
6	Girona (O, P)	42	20	8	14	57	42	+15	68 (Note: Girona finished ahead of Oviedo on head-to-head points: Girona 2–1 Oviedo, Oviedo 0–0 Girona.)	Qualification for promotion play-offs
7	Oviedo	42	17	17	8	57	41	+16	68	
8	Ponferradina	42	17	12	13	57	55	+2	63	
9	Cartagena	42	18	6	18	63	57	+6	60	
10	Zaragoza	42	12	20	10	39	46	−7	56	

Source: LaLiga SmartBank
Rules for classification: 1) points; 2) head-to-head points; 3) head-to-head goal difference; 4) goal difference; 5) number of goals scored
(O) Play-off winners; (P) Promoted

==== Results summary ====
Overall								Home						Away					
Pld	W	D	L	GF	GA	GD	Pts	W	D	L	GF	GA	GD	W	D	L	GF	GA	GD
42	17	12	13	57	55	+2	63	10	7	4	37	25	+12	7	5	9	20	30	−10

Source: La Liga SmartBank

==== Results by round ====
Round	1	2	3	4	5	6	7
Ground	H	A	H	A	H	H	A
Result	W	W	W	L	W	W	L
Position	7	3	1	3	2		

Source: La Liga SmartBank
A = Away; H = Home; W = Win; D = Draw; L = Loss

==== Matches ====
The league fixtures were announced on 30 June 2021.

14 August 2021 1	Ponferradina	1–0	Alcorcón	Ponferrada
22:00 CEST (UTC+2)	Yuri 50' (pen.)	Report		Stadium: El Toralín; Referee: Javier Iglesias Villanueva

22 August 2021 2	Eibar	0–1	Ponferradina	Eibar
19:30 CEST (UTC+2)		Report	Naranjo 57'	Stadium: Ipurua; Attendance: 1,146; Referee: Álvaro Moreno Aragón

28 August 2021 3	Ponferradina	2–1	Girona	Ponferrada
22:00 CEST (UTC+2)	Yuri 3'; Ojeda 85'	Report	Bustos 83'	Stadium: El Toralín; Attendance: 3,397; Referee: Juan Luis Pulido Santana

4 September 2021 4	Tenerife	2–0	Ponferradina	Santa Cruz de Tenerife
17:15 WEST (UTC+1)	Elady 52'; Muñoz 63'	Report		Stadium: Heliodoro Rodríguez López; Referee: Francisco José Hernández Maeso

12 September 2021 5	Ponferradina	1–0	Almería	Ponferrada
18:15 CEST (UTC+2)	Adot 69'	Report		Stadium: El Toralín; Referee: Dámaso Arcediano Monescillo

19 September 2021 6	Ponferradina	4–0	Málaga	Ponferrada
16:00 CEST (UTC+2)				Stadium: El Toralín

25 September 2021 7	Las Palmas	2–1	Ponferradina	Las Palmas
17:15 WEST (UTC+1)				Stadium: Estadio Gran Canaria

11 April 2022 35	Almería	3–0	Ponferradina	Almería
21:00 CET	Sadiq 16'; Arnau Puigmal 52'; Íñigo Eguaras 90+1'	Report		Stadium: Estadio de los Juegos Mediterráneos; Attendance: 9,836; Referee: (Spain) Daniel Trujillo Suárez

20 March 2022 32	Ponferradina	2–2	Eibar	Ponferrada
16:00 CET (UTC+1)	Sergi Enrich 5' (yellow card) 28'; Ricard Pujol (yellow card) 31'; Kike Saverio (red card) 35'; Yuri 43'	Report	Stoichkov (yellow card) 61'; Chema (yellow card) 64'; Álvaro Tejero (yellow card) 77'; Llorente 74' (red card) 79'; Frederico Venâncio (yellow card) 90+1'; Fran Sol 90+1'	Stadium: Estadio El Toralín; Attendance: 5,414; Referee: (Spain) Álvaro Moreno Aragón

=== Copa del Rey ===
4 January 2022 Round of 32	Ponferradina	1–1 (a.e.t.) (1–3 p)	Espanyol	Ponferrada
21:00 CET (UTC+1)	Yuri 88' (pen.), (yellow card) 90'; Pujol (yellow card) 115'	Report	Pedrosa 4'; Embarba (yellow card) 101'; Gil (yellow card) 116'	Stadium: El Toralín; Referee: Carlos del Cerro Grande
	Penalties
	Medina (penalty scored); Zalazar (penalty missed); Crespo (penalty missed); Saverio (penalty missed)		(penalty scored) Embarba; (penalty scored) Bare; (penalty scored) Mérida
