= 2020–21 SD Ponferradina season =

SD Ponferradina
2020–21 season
- President: José Fernández Nieto
- Head coach: Bolo
- Stadium: El Toralín
- Segunda División: 8th
- Copa del Rey: First round
- Top goalscorer: League: Yuri de Souza (11); All: Yuri de Souza (11)
Home colours	Away colours	Third colours

The 2020–21 SD Ponferradina season was the club's 99th season in existence and the club's second consecutive season in the second division of Spanish football. In addition to the domestic league, Ponferradina participated in this season's edition of the Copa del Rey. The season covered the period from 21 July 2020 to 30 June 2021.

== Players ==
=== First-team squad ===
Note: Flags indicate national team as defined under FIFA eligibility rules; some limited exceptions apply. Players may hold more than one non-FIFA nationality.

No.	Pos.	Nation	Player
1	GK	ARG	Gianfranco Gazzaniga
2	DF	ESP	Iván Rodríguez
3	DF	ESP	Ríos Reina (vice-captain)
5	DF	ESP	José María Amo
6	MF	ESP	Óscar Sielva
7	MF	ESP	Gaspar Panadero (on loan from Cádiz)
8	MF	ESP	Pablo Larrea
9	FW	ESP	Kaxe
10	FW	BRA	Yuri de Souza (captain)
11	DF	ESP	Moi (on loan from Valladolid)
13	GK	ESP	Manu García
14	MF	ESP	Sergio Aguza (on loan from Almería)
15	DF	NIG	Yac Magagi
16	MF	ESP	Curro Sánchez

No.	Pos.	Nation	Player
17	DF	ESP	Adri Castellano
18	MF	ESP	Erik Morán
19	FW	ESP	Carlos Doncel (on loan from Valladolid)
20	FW	ESP	Pablo Valcarce (on loan from Mallorca)
21	FW	ESP	Dani Romera
22	DF	ESP	Paris Adot
23	MF	ESP	Saúl Crespo
25	GK	ESP	José Antonio Caro (on loan from Valladolid)
26	FW	COL	Edward Bolaños
27	DF	ESP	Manu Hernando (on loan from Real Madrid)
28	DF	ROU	Alex Pașcanu (on loan from CFR Cluj)
30	MF	COL	Juergen Elitim (on loan from Watford)
33	MF	ESP	Alejandro Viedma
47	DF	ESP	Alfredo Pedraza

=== Reserve team ===
Note: Flags indicate national team as defined under FIFA eligibility rules; some limited exceptions apply. Players may hold more than one non-FIFA nationality.

No.	Pos.	Nation	Player
29	MF	ESP	Mario Ordóñez
31	FW	SEN	Aziz Sagna
32	DF	ESP	José Urbina

No.	Pos.	Nation	Player
38	DF	CPV	Jonatan Lopes
40	DF	ESP	Edu López

=== Out on loan ===
Note: Flags indicate national team as defined under FIFA eligibility rules; some limited exceptions apply. Players may hold more than one non-FIFA nationality.

No.	Pos.	Nation	Player
—	MF	MLI	Moussa Sidibé (at Córdoba until 30 June 2021)

== Pre-season and friendlies ==
Win Draw Loss

26 August 2020 Friendly	Lugo	1–2	Ponferradina	Lugo, Spain
18:00 CEST (UTC+2)				Stadium: Campo de Fútbol O Ceao; Attendance: 0

28 August 2020 Friendly	Sporting Gijón	1–0	Ponferradina	Gijón, Spain
18:30 CEST (UTC+2)	García 79'			Stadium: Escuela de Fútbol de Mareo; Attendance: 0 Referee: Francisco García Riesgo

5 September 2020 Friendly	Ponferradina	0–1	Real Oviedo	Ponferrada, Spain
19:30 CEST (UTC+2)				Stadium: Estadio El Toralín; Attendance: 0

== Competitions ==
=== Overview ===
Competition	First match	Last match	Starting round	Final position	Record							
Competition	First match	Last match	Starting round	Final position	Pld	W	D	L	GF	GA	GD	Win %
Segunda División	13 September 2020	30 May 2021	Matchday 1	8th	42	15	12	15	45	50	−5	35.71
Copa del Rey	15 December 2020		First round	First round	1	0	0	1	0	1	−1	0.00
Total					43	15	12	16	45	51	−6	34.88

Source: Soccerway

=== Segunda División ===
==== League table ====
Pos	Team	Pld	W	D	L	GF	GA	GD	Pts	Promotion, qualification or relegation
6	Rayo Vallecano (O, P)	42	19	10	13	52	40	+12	67	Qualification for promotion play-offs
7	Sporting Gijón	42	17	14	11	37	28	+9	65	
8	Ponferradina	42	15	12	15	45	50	−5	57	
9	Las Palmas	42	14	14	14	46	53	−7	56	
10	Mirandés	42	14	12	16	38	41	−3	54 (Note: Head-to-head points: Mirandés: 6, Fuenlabrada: 0)	

Source: LaLiga
Rules for classification: 1) points; 2) head-to-head points; 3) head-to-head goal difference; 4) goal difference; 5) number of goals scored
(O) Play-off winners; (P) Promoted

==== Results summary ====
Overall								Home						Away					
Pld	W	D	L	GF	GA	GD	Pts	W	D	L	GF	GA	GD	W	D	L	GF	GA	GD
42	15	12	15	45	50	−5	57	9	7	5	27	24	+3	6	5	10	18	26	−8

Source: La Liga

==== Results by round ====
Round	1	2	3	4	5	6	7	8	9	10	11	12	13	14	15	16	17	18	19	20	21	22	23	24	25	26	27	28	29	30	31	32	33	34	35	36	37	38	39	40	41	42
Ground	H	A	H	A	H	A	H	A	A	H	A	H	H	A	H	A	H	A	H	A	H	A	A	H	A	H	A	H	A	H	A	H	A	H	A	H	A	H	A	H	A	H
Result	L	W	W	W	L	W	W	L	L	L	L	D	W	D	W	W	D	L	W	L	D	W	L	W	L	W	D	D	D	W	D	D	L	D	D	W	L	L	W	L	L	D
Position	16	6	4	4	5	7	6	9	12	8	13	14	11	12	10	6	8	9	7	7	7	7	7	7	8	7	7	7	7	7	7	7	8	8	8	8	8	8	8	8	8	8

Source: La Liga
A = Away; H = Home; W = Win; D = Draw; L = Loss

==== Matches ====
The league fixtures were announced on 31 August 2020.

12 September 2020 1	Ponferradina	1–2	Castellón	Ponferrada
16:00 CEST (UTC+2)		Report		Stadium: El Toralín; Attendance: 0 (Note: The match was played behind closed doors due to the COVID-19 pandemic in Spain.); Referee: David Gálvez Rascón

20 September 2020 2	Albacete	0–2	Ponferradina	Albacete
18:15 CEST (UTC+2)	Kecojević (yellow card) 66' (yellow-red card) 89'; Benito (yellow card) 68'; Peña (yellow card) 90+2'	Report	Sidibé (yellow card) 19'; Hernando (yellow card) 34'; Yuri 42'; Valcarce 71'	Stadium: Estadio Carlos Belmonte; Attendance: 0 Referee: Francisco Hernández Maeso

27 September 2020 3	Ponferradina	3–0	Rayo Vallecano	Ponferrada
18:15 CEST (UTC+2)		Report		Stadium: El Toralín; Attendance: 0 Referee: Eduardo Prieto Iglesias

3 October 2020 4	Mirandés	0–1	Ponferradina	Miranda de Ebro
16:00 CEST (UTC+2)		Report		Stadium: Estadio Municipal de Anduva; Attendance: 0 Referee: Daniel Ocón Arráiz

11 October 2020 5	Ponferradina	0–2	Cartagena	Ponferrada
18:30 CEST (UTC+2)		Report		Stadium: El Toralín; Attendance: 0 Referee: Álvaro Moreno Aragón

21 October 2020 7	Ponferradina	1–0	Tenerife	Ponferrada
19:00 CEST (UTC+2)		Report		Stadium: El Toralín; Attendance: 0 Referee: Aitor Gorostegui Fernández-Ortega

25 October 2020 8	Sporting Gijón	2–1	Ponferradina	Gijón
16:00 CEST (UTC+2)	Rosas (yellow card) 26'; Manu García 67'; Vázquez 87'; Díaz (yellow card) 89'	Report	Hamani (yellow card) 13'; Kaxe 18'; Morán (yellow card) 37'; Valcarce (yellow card) 90+4'	Stadium: El Molinón; Attendance: 0 Referee: José Antonio López Toca

28 October 2020 9	Espanyol	2–0	Ponferradina	Cornellà de Llobregat
19:00 CEST (UTC+2)	De Tomás 24'; Vargas (yellow card) 28'; Cabrera (yellow card) 38'; Embarda 48'; Pedrosa (yellow card) 88'	Report	Doncel (yellow card) 14'; Rodríguez (yellow card) 25'; Elitim (yellow card) 73'; Amo (yellow card) 76'; Yuri (yellow card) 83'	Stadium: RCDE Stadium; Attendance: 0 Referee: Luis Milla Alvendiz

1 November 2020 10	Ponferradina	0–3	Sabadell	Ponferrada
18:15 CET (UTC+1)		Report		Stadium: El Toralín; Attendance: 0 Referee: Rafael Sánchez López

5 November 2020 6	Alcorcón	0–1	Ponferradina	Alcorcón
19:00 CET (UTC+1)		Report		Stadium: Santo Domingo; Attendance: 0 Referee: Jon Ander González Esteban

8 November 2020 11	Mallorca	3–0	Ponferradina	Palma
18:15 CET (UTC+1)	Raíllo (yellow card) 5'; Rodríguez 21', 43', (yellow card) 53'; Mboula (yellow card) 34'; Sánchez 54'; Joan Sastre (yellow card) 88'	Report	Castellano (yellow card) 81'	Stadium: Visit Mallorca Stadium; Attendance: 0 Referee: Francisco Hernández Maeso

15 November 2020 12	Ponferradina	1–1	Málaga	Ponferrada
16:15 CET (UTC+1)		Report		Stadium: El Toralín; Attendance: 0 Referee: Alejandro Muñiz Ruiz

22 November 2020 13	Ponferradina	2–1	Zaragoza	Ponferrada
21:00 CET (UTC+1)	Hernando (yellow card) 41'; Valcarce (yellow card) 45+3'; Sola 61' (o.g.); Curro (yellow card) 69'; Romera 78'	Report	Narváez 46'; Sola (yellow card) 73'; Eguaras (yellow card) 81'	Stadium: El Toralín; Attendance: 0 Referee: Javier Iglesias Villanueva

25 November 2020 14	Fuenlabrada	1–1	Ponferradina	Fuenlabrada
21:30 CET (UTC+1)		Report		Stadium: Fernando Torres; Attendance: 0 Referee: Rafael Sánchez López

29 November 2020 15	Ponferradina	3–2	Leganés	Ponferrada
18:15 CET (UTC+1)	Sánchez 22'; Sielva 35'; Yuri 54' (pen.)	Report	Muñoz 16'; Sielva 39' (o.g.); Tarín (yellow card) 52'; Rosales (yellow card) 90'	Stadium: El Toralín; Attendance: 0 Referee: José Antonio López Toca

2 December 2020 16	UD Logroñés	1–2	Ponferradina	Logroño
19:00 CET (UTC+1)		Report		Stadium: Las Gaunas; Attendance: 0 Referee: Saúl Ais Reig

5 December 2020 17	Ponferradina	0–0	Las Palmas	Ponferrada
16:00 CET (UTC+1)	Ríos (yellow card) 43'; Adot (yellow card) 79'	Report	Athuman (yellow card) 56'; Lemos (yellow card) 81'; Castellano (yellow card) 86'	Stadium: El Toralín; Attendance: 0 Referee: Miguel Ángel Ortiz Arias

11 December 2020 18	Lugo	1–0	Ponferradina	Lugo
19:00 CET (UTC+1)		Report		Stadium: Anxo Carro; Attendance: 0 Referee: Daniel Ocón Arráiz

18 December 2020 19	Ponferradina	1–0	Oviedo	Ponferrada
19:00 CET (UTC+1)	Yuri 15', (penalty missed) 88'	Report	Sangalli (yellow card) 90'; González (yellow card) 90+2'	Stadium: El Toralín; Attendance: 0 Referee: Iñaki Vicandi Garrido

3 January 2021 20	Almería	3–1	Ponferradina	Almería
20:30 CET (UTC+1)	Sadiq 2', 21', 29'; Maraš (yellow card) 45'; Akieme (red card) 76'; Petrović (yellow card) 83'	Report	Morán (yellow card) 58'; Sánchez 82'	Stadium: Estadio de los Juegos Mediterráneos; Attendance: 0 Referee: Eduardo Prieto Iglesias

11 January 2021 21	Ponferradina	1–1	Girona	Ponferrada
19:00 CET (UTC+1)		Report		Stadium: El Toralín; Attendance: 0 Referee: Saúl Ais Reig

23 January 2021 22	Málaga	0–2	Ponferradina	Málaga
20:30 CET (UTC+1)		Report		Stadium: La Rosaleda; Attendance: 0 Referee: Javier Iglesias Villanueva

29 January 2021 23	Zaragoza	1–0	Ponferradina	Zaragoza
21:00 CET (UTC+1)	Narváez 41' (pen.); Eguaras (yellow card) 45+1'; Alegría (yellow card) 80'	Report	Valcarce (yellow card) 15'	Stadium: La Romareda; Attendance: 0 Referee: Dámaso Arcediano Monescillo

8 February 2021 24	Ponferradina	2–0	Alcorcón	Ponferrada
19:00 CET (UTC+1)	Yuri 16', 56' (pen.)	Report		Stadium: El Toralín; Attendance: 0 Referee: Daniel Ocón Arráiz

13 February 2021 25	Tenerife	1–0	Ponferradina	Santa Cruz de Tenerife
20:30 CET (UTC+1)		Report		Stadium: Heliodoro Rodríguez López; Attendance: 0 Referee: Iñaki Vicandi Garrido

19 February 2021 26	Ponferradina	1–0	Mirandés	Ponferrada
21:00 CET (UTC+1)		Report		Stadium: El Toralín; Attendance: 0 Referee: Eduardo Prieto Iglesias

27 February 2021 27	Rayo Vallecano	1–1	Ponferradina	Madrid
16:00 CET (UTC+1)		Report		Stadium: Vallecas; Attendance: 0 Referee: Alejandro Muñiz Ruiz

7 March 2021 28	Ponferradina	2–2	Sporting Gijón	Ponferrada
16:00 CET (UTC+1)	Sánchez 52'; Valcarce 54'	Report	Díaz 39' (pen.); Pérez 47'	Stadium: El Toralín; Attendance: 0 Referee: Francisco José Hernández Maeso

12 March 2021 29	Cartagena	1–1	Ponferradina	Cartagena
19:00 CET (UTC+1)		Report		Stadium: Cartagonova; Attendance: 0 Referee: David Gálvez Rascón

21 March 2021 30	Ponferradina	2–1	Almería	Ponferrada
14:00 CET (UTC+1)	Yuri (yellow card) 32', (goal) 60'; Amo (yellow card) 46'; Morán (yellow card) 75'; Delgado 90'	Report	Villalba (yellow card) 16'; Cuenca (yellow card) 39'; Costa 41'; Carvalho (yellow card) 48'; Makaridze (yellow card) 83'; Schettine (yellow card) 84'	Stadium: El Toralín; Attendance: 0 Referee: Iosu Galech Apezteguia

27 March 2021 31	Oviedo	1–1	Ponferradina	Oviedo
16:00 CET (UTC+1)		Report		Stadium: Carlos Tartiere; Attendance: 0 Referee: Iñaki Vicandi Garrido

30 March 2021 32	Ponferradina	2–2	UD Logroñés	Ponferrada
21:00 CEST (UTC+2)		Report		Stadium: El Toralín; Attendance: 0 Referee: Álvaro Moreno Aragón

3 April 2021 33	Girona	3–1	Ponferradina	Girona
16:00 CEST (UTC+2)		Report		Stadium: Montilivi; Attendance: 0 Referee: Dámaso Arcediano Monescillo

10 April 2021 34	Ponferradina	0–0	Fuenlabrada	Ponferrada
14:00 CEST (UTC+2)		Report		Stadium: El Toralín; Attendance: 0 Referee: Rubén Ávalos Barrera

19 April 2021 35	Leganés	1–1	Ponferradina	Leganés
19:00 CEST (UTC+2)	González 32'	Report	Sielva 75'	Stadium: Estadio Municipal de Butarque; Attendance: 0 Referee: Saúl Ais Reig

24 April 2021 36	Ponferradina	2–0	Lugo	Ponferrada
20:30 CEST (UTC+2)	Adot 10'; Yuri 78'	Report		Stadium: El Toralín; Attendance: 0 Referee: Juan Luis Pulido Santana

2 May 2021 37	Las Palmas	2–0	Ponferradina	Las Palmas
20:30 CEST (UTC+2)	Mesa 18' (pen.); Araujo 70'; Cardona (yellow card) 80'	Report		Stadium: Estadio Gran Canaria; Attendance: 0 Referee: Iñaki Vicandi Garrido

8 May 2021 38	Ponferradina	0–1	Albacete	Ponferrada
18:15 CEST (UTC+2)	Rodríguez (yellow card) 47'; Castellano (red card) 75'; Gaspar (yellow card) 86'; Larrea (yellow card) 90+4'; Caro (yellow card) 90+7'	Report	J. Jiménez (yellow card) 7'; Benito (yellow card) 28'; Á. Jiménez 45' (pen.); Gorosito (yellow card) 58'	Stadium: El Toralín; Attendance: 0 Referee: Iosu Galech Apezteguía

15 May 2021 39	Castellón	0–2	Ponferradina	Castellón de la Plana
16:00 CEST (UTC+2)	Bodiger (yellow card) 24'; Gálvez (yellow card) 71'; Díaz (yellow card) 90+4'	Report	Sielva 45'; Valcarce 88'	Stadium: Nou Estadi Castàlia; Attendance: 0 Referee: Daniel Jesús Trujillo Suárez

18 May 2021 40	Ponferradina	1–4	Espanyol	Ponferrada
21:30 CEST (UTC+2)	Curro (yellow card) 35'; García (yellow card) 45+1'; Darder 51' (o.g.); Sielva (yellow card) 60'; Morán (yellow card) 62'; Ríos (yellow card) 85'	Report	Dimata 1', 54'; Puado 8' (pen.); Da. López (yellow card) 40'; Melamed 90+2'	Stadium: El Toralín; Attendance: 0 Referee: Rafael Sánchez López

24 May 2021 41	Sabadell	2–0	Ponferradina	Sabadell
21:00 CEST (UTC+2)	Cuevas 10'; Undabarrena (yellow card) 23'; Stoichkov 34'; Ibiza (yellow card) 73'	Report	Amo (yellow card) 70'	Stadium: Estadi de la Nova Creu Alta; Attendance: 0 Referee: Alejandro Muñiz Ruiz

30 May 2021 42	Ponferradina	2–2	Mallorca	Ponferrada
21:00 CEST (UTC+2)	Sielva 43' (pen.); Caro (red card) 85'; Curro 87'	Report	Mollejo (yellow card) 8'; Raíllo (yellow card) 40'; Cardona 45+2'; Febas (yellow card) 65'; Abdón 75'	Stadium: El Toralín; Attendance: 0 Referee: Álvaro Moreno Aragón

=== Copa del Rey ===
15 December 2020 First round	Portugalete	1–0	Ponferradina	Portugalete
19:00 CET (UTC+1)	Valero 73'	Report		Stadium: La Florida; Referee: Iosu Galech Apezteguía
