= 2009 UEFA European Under-21 Championship qualification Group 4 =

Football tournament qualification stage

The teams competing in group 4 of the 2009 UEFA European Under-21 Championships qualifying competition are Georgia, Kazakhstan, Poland, Russia and Spain.

== Standings ==
Team	Pld	W	D	L	GF	GA	GD	Pts
Spain	8	8	0	0	21	2	+19	24
Russia	8	5	0	3	14	6	+8	15
Poland	8	3	0	5	9	11	−2	9
Kazakhstan	8	2	0	6	9	18	−9	6
Georgia	8	2	0	6	6	22	−16	6

Key: Pts Points, Pld Matches played, W Won, D Drawn, L Lost, GF Goals for, GA Goals against, GD Goal Difference

== Matches ==
5 June 2007
16:00 UTC+2

Georgia	0 – 1	Spain
	Report	José Enrique 74'

Boris Paichadze Stadium, Tbilisi
Referee: Robert Krajnc (Slovenia)

22 August 2007
12:00 UTC+2

Kazakhstan	0 – 3 (awarded)	Russia
	Report	Dzyuba 86'

Shakhter Stadium, Karaganda
Referee: Joeri Van De Velde (Belgium)
- Match originally ended as 1–0 win for Russia. UEFA later awarded the match as a 3–0 forfeit win to Russia due to the use of a suspended player by Kazakhstan.
22 August 2007
17:00 UTC+2

Poland	3 – 1	Georgia
Pawłowski 7'; Ćwielong 57'; Majewski 83'	Report	Ghvinianidze 67'

LKS Kmita, Zabierzów
Referee: Haim Jakov (Israel)

7 September 2007
13:00 UTC+2

Georgia	2 – 1	Kazakhstan
Gotsiridze 17'; Merebashvili 43'	Report	Noskov 90+1'

Poladi Stadium, Rustavi
Referee: Csaba Sapi (Hungary)
7 September 2007
17:00 UTC+2

Russia	1 – 0	Poland
Kozhanov 57'	Report

Eduard Streltsov Stadium, Moscow
Referee: Kevin Blom (Netherlands)

11 September 2007
15:30 UTC+2

Poland	1 – 0	Kazakhstan
Pawłowski 59'	Report

MOSiR Stadium, Wodzisław Śląski
Referee: Michael Svendsen (Denmark)
11 September 2007
19:00 UTC+2

Spain	4 – 0	Georgia
Xisco 13'; Jurado 45+1' (pen.); Granero 68'; Adrián 80'	Report

Municipal de Deportes Francisco Bonet, Almuñécar
Referee: Markus Strömbergsson (Sweden)

12 October 2007
16:00 UTC+2

Russia	4 – 0	Kazakhstan
D. Kombarov 1'; K. Kombarov 43', 81'; Fayzulin 48'	Report

Eduard Streltsov Stadium, Moscow
Referee: Alexandru Deaconu (Romania)
12 October 2007
17:00 UTC+2

Poland	0 – 2	Spain
	Report	Jurado 69'; Bojan 90+2'

OSiR Włocławek, Włocławek
Referee: Bülent Demirlek (Turkey)

16 October 2007
15:00 UTC+2

Kazakhstan	4 – 1	Georgia
Kenbaev 31', 35'; Nurgaliyev 41' (pen.), 88'	Report	Barabadze 86'

Aktobe Central Stadium, Aktobe
Referee: Goran Mihaljevic (Montenegro)
16 October 2007
15:15 UTC+2

Poland	0 – 1	Russia
	Report	Prudnikov 70'

Public stadium, Toruń
Referee: René Rogalla (Switzerland)

16 November 2007
20:30 UTC+2

Spain	3 – 0	Poland
Glik 41' (o.g.); Bojan 90+3'; Capel 90+4'	Report

Estadio El Toralín, Ponferrada
Referee: Tony Chapron (France)
20 November 2007
16:00 UTC+2

Georgia	2 – 0	Russia
Barabadze 36'; Gotsiridze 82'	Report

Mikheil Meskhi Stadium, Tbilisi
Referee: Mechalis Germanakos (Greece)

25 March 2008
21:45 UTC+2

Spain	5 – 0	Kazakhstan
Jurado 9'; Capel 29'; Bojan 33'; Mata 39'; Callejón 60'	Report

El Maulí, Antequera
Referee: Cyril Zimmermann (Switzerland)

19 August 2008
16:00 UTC+2

Kazakhstan	3 – 0	Poland
Nusserbayev 11', 90+2'; Kenbaev 30'	Report

Almaty Central Stadium, Almaty
Referee: Pavel Olsiak (Slovakia)
20 August 2008
16:00 UTC+2

Russia	1 – 2	Spain
K. Kombarov 49'	Report	Xisco 8'; Jurado 27'

Eduard Streltsov Stadium, Moscow
Referee: Manuel Gräfe (Germany)

5 September 2008
15:00 UTC+2

Russia	4 – 0	Georgia
Nababkin 7'; Prudnikov 41', 52'; Salugin 63'	Report

Traktor Stadium, Minsk
Referee: Adrian McCourt (Northern Ireland)
5 September 2008
19:00 UTC+2

Kazakhstan	1 – 2	Spain
Kenbaev 59'	Report	Granero 24'; Sabalakov 87' (o.g.)

Almaty Central Stadium, Almaty
Referee: Hannes Kaasik (Estonia)

9 September 2008
15:00 UTC+2

Georgia	0 – 5	Poland
	Report	Glik 13', 81'; Korzym 74', 88'; Cetnarski 90+4'

Traktor Stadium, Minsk
Referee: Arman Amirkhanyan (Armenia)
9 September 2008
19:00 UTC+2

Spain	2 – 0	Russia
Mata 70'; Piqué 77'	Report

Estadio La Nueva Balastera, Palencia
Referee: Andrea De Marco (Italy)

== Goalscorers ==
Pos	Player	Country	Goals
1	Yerzat Kenbaev	Kazakhstan	4
1	José Manuel Jurado	Spain	4
3	Kirill Kombarov	Russia	3
3	Aleksandr Prudnikov	Russia	3
3	Bojan Krkić	Spain	3
6	Revaz Barabadze	Georgia	2
6	Beka Gotsiridze	Georgia	2
6	Azat Nurgaliyev	Kazakhstan	2
6	Tanat Nusserbayev	Kazakhstan	2
6	Kamil Glik	Poland	2
6	Maciej Korzym	Poland	2
6	Szymon Pawłowski	Poland	2
6	Diego Capel	Spain	2
6	Esteban Granero	Spain	2
6	Juan Mata	Spain	2
6	Xisco	Spain	2

1 goal

- Georgia: Mate Ghvinianidze, Giorgi Merebashvili
- Kazakhstan: Vladimir Noskov
- Poland: Mateusz Cetnarski, Piotr Ćwielong, Radosław Majewski
- Russia: Viktor Fayzulin, Dmitry Kombarov, Oleg Kozhanov, Kirill Nababkin, Aleksandr Salugin
- Spain: Adrián, José Callejón, Gerard Piqué, José Enrique

Own goals

- Kazakhstan: Talgat Sabalakov
- Poland: Kamil Glik
