= Carlos Bravo =

Carlos Bravo may refer to:

- Carlos Bravo (fencer) (born 1973), Venezuelan fencer
- Carlos Bravo (footballer) (born 1993), Spanish footballer
