= Juan Fuentes =

Juan Fuentes may refer to:

- Juan Fuentes (Chilean footballer) (born 1995)
- Juan Rafael Fuentes (born 1990), Spanish footballer
- Juan Manuel Fuentes (footballer) (born 1977), Spanish footballer
- Juan Manuel Fuentes (cyclist) (born 1977), Spanish cyclist
- Juan Francisco Fuentes (born 1955), Spanish historian
- Juan Alberto Fuentes, Guatemalan economist, politician, and non-profit official
