= Mauro Molina =

Mauro Molina may refer to:

- Mauro Molina (Argentine footballer) (born 1999), Argentine football forward for Independiente
- Mauro Molina (Spanish footballer) (born 2001), Spanish football winger for Ponferradina B
