= Pablo Valcarce =

Spanish footballer

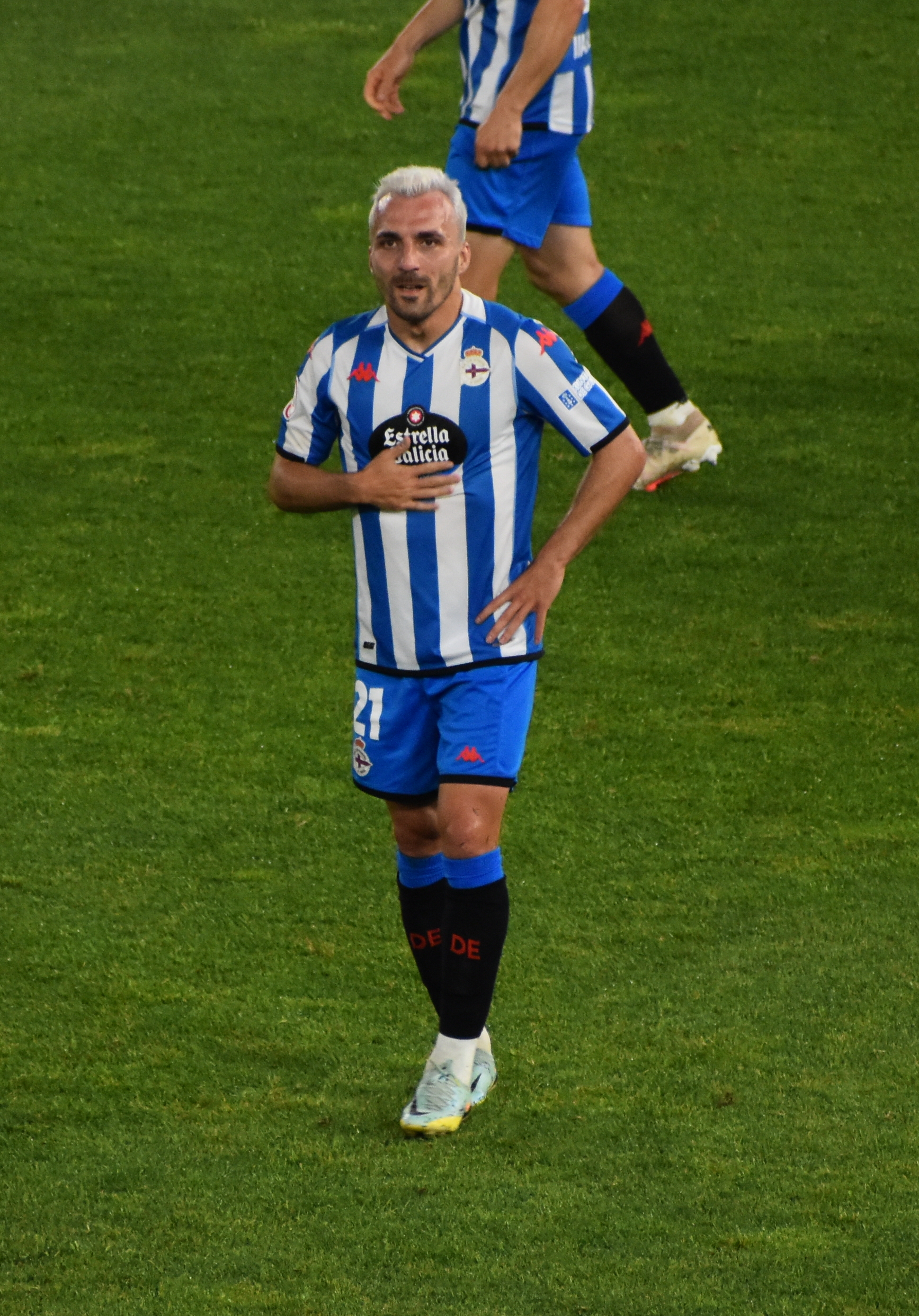
- Valcarce playing for Deportivo La Coruña in 2024

Personal information
- Full name: Pablo Valcarce Vidal
- Date of birth: 3 February 1993 (age 33)
- Place of birth: Ponferrada, Spain
- Height: 1.72 m (5 ft 8 in)
- Position: Winger

Youth career
- Ponferradina
- 2011–2012: Numancia

Senior career*
Years	Team	Apps	(Gls)
2011	Ponferradina B	1	(0)
2012–2015	Numancia B	97	(24)
2015–2018	Numancia	101	(19)
2018–2021	Mallorca	10	(1)
2019–2021	→ Ponferradina (loan)	71	(10)
2021–2023	Burgos	75	(10)
2023–2024	Deportivo La Coruña	15	(2)
2025	UD Logroñés	3	(0)
- * Club domestic league appearances and goals as of 5 July 2025

Pablo Valcarce Vidal (born 3 February 1993) is a Spanish professional footballer. Mainly a right winger, he can also play as a forward.

== Club career ==
=== Numancia ===
Born in Ponferrada, Castile and León, Valcarce began his career with hometown club SD Ponferradina, making his senior debut with the reserves. In 2011 he moved to CD Numancia, being initially assigned to the youth setup and being promoted to the B team after one year.

On 30 January 2015, both Valcarce and his twin brother Luis renewed their contract with the Rojillos, until 2017. He played his first match as a professional on 15 March, coming on as a late substitute for Javier del Pino in a 4–0 away loss against Real Valladolid in the Segunda División.

Valcarce scored his first league goal on 23 August, his team's fifth in a 6–3 home victory over CD Tenerife. Six days later, he netted twice in a 3–2 win at Girona FC, the second being a last-minute effort.

On 29 January 2016, Valcarce signed his first professional contract, being definitely promoted to the main squad and assigned the number 20 jersey. He scored two braces during the 2016–17 campaign, against Elche CF (2–2, at home) and UCAM Murcia CF (3–2 away loss), both in November.

=== Mallorca ===
On 2 July 2018, free agent Valcarce signed a four-year contract with fellow second division side RCD Mallorca. He made his official debut on 19 August, playing 20 minutes in place of Aridai Cabrera in a 1–0 home defeat of CA Osasuna.

Valcarce scored his first goal on 1 December 2018, in 2–0 away win against CF Reus Deportiu. He made only ten appearances during the season (12 across all competitions), as the club achieved a second consecutive promotion to reach La Liga.

On 19 July 2019, Valcarce returned to Ponferradina after agreeing to a one-year loan deal. On 14 September of the following year, the move was extended for a further season.

=== Burgos ===
On 1 August 2021, Valcarce joined Burgos CF, newly promoted to the second division, after terminating his contract with Mallorca.

== Career statistics ==
As of match played on 5 December 2021

Appearances and goals by club, season and competition
Club	Season	League			National Cup		Other		Total	
Club	Season	Division	Apps	Goals	Apps	Goals	Apps	Goals	Apps	Goals
Numancia	2014–15	Segunda División	2	0	0	0	—		2	0
Numancia	2015–16	Segunda División	34	7	0	0	—		34	7
Numancia	2016–17	Segunda División	36	8	1	0	—		37	8
Numancia	2017–18	Segunda División	29	4	1	0	1 (Note: Appearance(s) in Promotion Playoffs)	0	31	4
Numancia	Total		101	19	2	0	1	0	104	19
Mallorca	2018–19	Segunda División	10	1	2	0	—		12	1
Ponferradina (loan)	2019–20	Segunda División	33	5	1	0	—		34	5
Ponferradina (loan)	2020–21	Segunda División	38	5	1	0	—		39	5
Ponferradina (loan)	Total		71	10	2	0	0	0	73	10
Burgos	2021–22	Segunda División	16	6	0	0	—		16	6
Career total			198	36	6	0	1	0	205	36
