= Luis Vázquez =

Luis Vázquez may refer to:

- Luis Vázquez Martínez (born 1949), Spanish applied mathematician
- Luis Vázquez (footballer) (born 2001), Argentine footballer for Boca Juniors
- Luis Vázquez (baseball) (born 1999), Puerto Rican baseball player

== See also ==
- Luis Vasquez (disambiguation)
