= Saúl Crespo =

Spanish footballer

Personal information
- Full name: Saúl Crespo Prieto
- Date of birth: 23 July 1996 (age 30)
- Place of birth: Ponferrada, Spain
- Height: 1.86 m (6 ft 1 in)
- Position: Central midfielder

Youth career
- 2010–2015: Ponferradina

Senior career*
Years	Team	Apps	(Gls)
2015–2022	Ponferradina	125	(12)
2015–2016	→ Atlético Astorga (loan)	38	(4)
2016–2017	→ Arandina (loan)	36	(6)
2022–2023	Odisha	18	(0)
2023–2026	East Bengal	34	(7)
- * Club domestic league appearances and goals as of 08:46, 7 October 2026 (UTC)

Saúl Crespo Prieto (born 23 July 1996), commonly known as Saúl, is a Spanish professional footballer who plays as a central midfielder.

== Club career ==
Saúl was born in Ponferrada, Castile and León, and joined SD Ponferradina's youth setup in 2010. On 12 August 2015, after finishing his formation, he was loaned to Segunda División B side Atlético Astorga FC for the season.

Saúl made his senior debut on 19 September 2015, coming on as a second-half substitute in a 1–1 away draw against UD Logroñés. On 16 September, he signed a professional contract with Ponfe for three seasons.

Saúl scored his first goal on 10 April 2016, netting the equalizer in a 1–2 loss at CD Guijuelo; he finished the campaign with 25 appearances, as his team suffered relegation. On 8 August, he moved to fellow third division side Arandina CF, also in a temporary deal.

Saúl returned to his parent club in July 2017, and was definitely assigned to the main squad. On 14 June of the following year, he renewed his contract with the club, and contributed with one goal in 30 appearances in 2018–19 as his side returned to Segunda División after three years.

Saúl made his professional debut on 18 August 2019, coming on as a second-half substitute for Yuri de Souza in a 1–3 away loss against Cádiz CF.

=== Odisha ===
In July 2022, Saúl moved abroad for the first time, signing a one-year contract with Indian Super League club Odisha.

On 17 August, Saúl made his debut for the club against NorthEast United in the Durand Cup, in a thumping 6–0 win. Six days later, he scored his first goal for the club against Kerala Blasters which ended in 2–0 win.

== Career statistics ==
As of 23 July 2025

Appearances and goals by club, season and competition
Club	Season	League			National cup (Note: Includes Copa del Rey, AIFF Super Cup)		League cup (Note: Includes Durand Cup)		Continental		Total	
Club	Season	Division	Apps	Goals	Apps	Goals	Apps	Goals	Apps	Goals	Apps	Goals
Ponferradina	2017–18	Segunda División B	29	0	3	0	—		—		32	0
Ponferradina	2018–19	Segunda División B	35	1	0	0	—		—		35	1
Ponferradina	2019–20	Segunda División	22	0	2	0	—		—		24	0
Ponferradina	2020–21	Segunda División	15	0	1	0	—		—		16	0
Ponferradina	2021–22	Segunda División	18	0	3	0	—		—		21	0
Ponferradina	Total		119	1	9	0	0	0	0	0	128	1
Atlético Astorga (loan)	2015–16	Segunda División B	25	1	0	0	—		—		25	1
Arandina (loan)	2016–17	Segunda División B	36	0	0	0	—		—		36	0
Odisha	2022–23	Indian Super League	18	0	3	0	5	3	1 (Note: Appearance(s) in playoff for the AFC Cup group stage)	0	27	3
East Bengal	2023–24	Indian Super League	14	4	5	2	6	1	—		25	7
East Bengal	2024–25	Indian Super League	13	1	1	0	3	2	6 (Note: One appearance in AFC Champions League Two, five appearances in AFC Challenge League)	1	23	4
East Bengal	2025–26	Indian Super League	0	0	0	0	1	1	—		1	1
East Bengal	Total		27	5	6	2	10	4	6	1	49	12
Career total			200	7	18	2	15	7	7	1	240	17

== Honours ==
Odisha

- AIFF Super Cup: 2023

East Bengal

- Indian Super League: 2025–26
- AIFF Super Cup: 2024
