= Raúl Arias (footballer, born 2003) =

Spanish footballer

Personal information
- Full name: Raúl Arias Arias
- Date of birth: 16 January 2003 (age 23)
- Place of birth: Bembibre, Spain
- Height: 1.74 m (5 ft 9 in)
- Position: Winger

Youth career
- Atlético Bembibre
- Ponferradina

Senior career*
Years	Team	Apps	(Gls)
2021–2025	Ponferradina B	51	(6)
2022–2025	Ponferradina	3	(0)
2024–2025	→ Tudelano (loan)	13	(3)
- * Club domestic league appearances and goals as of 4 May 2025

Raúl Arias Arias (born 16 January 2003) is a Spanish footballer who plays as a winger.

== Club career ==
Arias was born in Bembibre, León, Castile and León, and represented CA Bembibre and SD Ponferradina as a youth. He started to feature with the latter's reserves during the 2020–21 season, and scored ten goals in the 2021–22 campaign as the B-side achieved promotion to Tercera Federación.

Arias made his first team debut on 3 September 2022, coming on as a late substitute for Derik Lacerda in a 3–1 Segunda División home loss against Sporting de Gijón.
