= Luis Vázquez Martínez =

Spanish mathematician (born 1949)

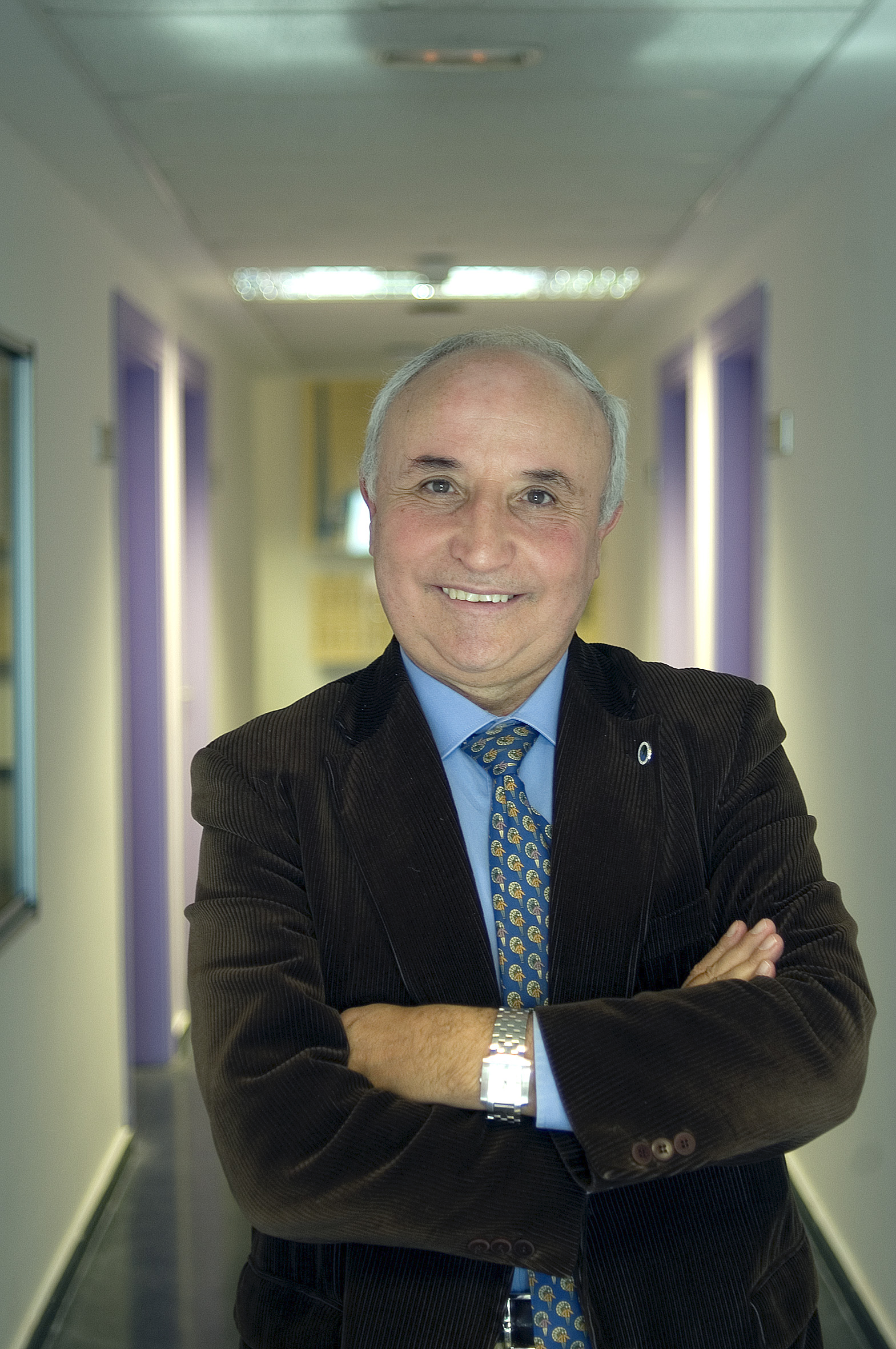
Martínez at the Faculty of Informatics (Complutense University of Madrid)

Luis Vázquez Martínez is a Spanish applied mathematician. He is a professor of applied mathematics in the faculty of informatics of the Complutense University of Madrid.

Vázquez was born on January 26, 1949, in Narayola, a town in the municipality of Camponaraya. He earned a licenciate in physical sciences from the Complutense University of Madrid in 1971, and a doctorate in physical sciences from the University of Zaragoza in 1975, under the supervision of Antonio Fernández-Rañada Menéndez de Luarca. After working as a Visiting Research Associate at Brown University, he returned to the Complutense University as an assistant professor in 1977.

In 1995 the Shanghai University of Science and Technology gave him an honorary doctorate. Since 2005 has been a national corresponding member of the Spanish Royal Academy of Sciences.
