= Pablo Trigueros =

Spanish footballer

Personal information
- Full name: Pablo Trigueros Estrada
- Date of birth: 4 March 1993 (age 33)
- Place of birth: Herreruela de Oropesa, Spain
- Height: 1.88 m (6 ft 2 in)
- Position: Centre-back

Team information
- Current team: Lugo
- Number: 4

Youth career
- Atlético Madrid

Senior career*
Years	Team	Apps	(Gls)
2012–2015	Atlético Madrid C	39	(3)
2013–2014	Atlético Madrid B	9	(0)
2015–2017	Arandina	49	(4)
2017–2018	Rápido Bouzas	36	(4)
2018–2020	Ponferradina	61	(2)
2020–2021	Mirandés	18	(0)
2021–2022	Deportivo La Coruña	8	(0)
2022–2023	Cultural Leonesa	31	(2)
2023–2024	Gimnàstic	37	(5)
2024–2025	Andorra	24	(0)
2025–	Lugo	15	(0)
- * Club domestic league appearances and goals as of 9 June 2026

Pablo Trigueros Estrada (born 4 March 1993) is a Spanish footballer who plays as a centre-back for CD Lugo.

== Club career ==
Born in Herreruela de Oropesa, Toledo, Castile-La Mancha, Trigueros was an Atlético Madrid youth graduate. During his first three seasons, he alternated between the C and B-teams in Tercera División and Segunda División B, respectively.

In August 2015, Trigueros joined Arandina CF in the third division. In July 2017, after suffering relegation, he moved to fellow league team Rápido de Bouzas.

On 11 June 2018, Trigueros signed for SD Ponferradina, still in division three. He was a regular starter in the campaign, contributing with one goal in 29 appearances as his side returned to Segunda División after three years.

Trigueros made his professional debut on 18 August 2019, starting and scoring the opener in a 1–3 away loss against Cádiz CF. He left the club after his contract expired in July 2020, and signed a one-year deal with fellow second division side CD Mirandés on 1 October.

On 6 July 2021, after featuring sparingly, Trigueros signed for Deportivo de La Coruña in Primera División RFEF. He continued to appear in that level in the following seasons, representing Cultural y Deportiva Leonesa, Gimnàstic de Tarragona and FC Andorra.

== Personal life ==
Trigueros' cousin and uncle, both named Manuel, were midfielders. The elder played no higher than the second tier for Granada CF, while the younger had a lengthy La Liga career with Villarreal CF.
