= Yacouba Diori Hamani Magagi =

Nigerien footballer

Yac Magagi
Personal information
- Full name: Yacouba Diori Hamani Magagi
- Date of birth: 8 September 1997 (age 29)
- Place of birth: Niamey, Niger
- Height: 1.80 m (5 ft 11 in)
- Position: Centre-back

Team information
- Current team: Ahed
- Number: 25

Youth career
- Kandadji Sport

Senior career*
| Years | Team | Apps | (Gls) |
| 2012–2016 | Kandadji Sport | | |
| 2016 | CIA | 5 | (0) |
| 2016–2017 | Ponferradina B | 25 | (5) |
| 2017–2021 | Ponferradina | 33 | (0) |
| 2020 | → Getafe B (loan) | 7 | (0) |
| 2021–2023 | Castellón | 43 | (2) |
| 2023–2024 | Algeciras | 36 | (1) |
| 2024–2025 | Marbella | 21 | (0) |
| 2025 | Arenteiro | 12 | (0) |
| 2025–2026 | Al-Karkh | 18 | (0) |
| 2026– | Ahed | 0 | (0) |

International career^{‡}
| 2016– | Niger | 10 | (0) |
- * Club domestic league appearances and goals as of 10 March 2026 ‡ National team caps and goals as of 10 October 2020

Yacouba Diori Hamani "Yac" Magagi (born 8 September 1997) is a Nigerien professional footballer who plays as a defender for Lebanese Premier League club Ahed and the Niger national team. Mainly a central defender, he can also play as a right back.

== Club career ==
Born in Niamey, Magagi started his career abroad in 2016, with Spanish side Club Internacional de la Amistad in the regional leagues. On 12 September of that year he moved to SD Ponferradina, initially assigned to the reserves.

Magagi made his first-team debut on 14 May 2017, starting in a 0–0 home draw against CD Tudelano in the Segunda División B. He was promoted to the first team for the 2017–18 season, but only appeared rarely in the club's promotion campaign.

Magagi made his professional debut on 19 October 2019, starting in a 1–1 home draw against CD Numancia. The following 20 January, he moved to Getafe CF's reserves on loan for the remainder of the season.

Upon returning, Magagi featured rarely before joining Primera División RFEF side CD Castellón on 22 July 2021. On 25 September, he scored his first goal for the side, netting a last-minute equalizer in a 1–1 draw against UE Cornellà.

On 25 July 2024, he signed a one-season deal with Marbella.

== International career ==
Magagi made his full international debut with the Niger national team on 4 June 2016, starting in a 2017 Africa Cup of Nations qualifiers 0–1 loss against Namibia.
