= Alexandru Pașcanu =

Romanian footballer (born 1998)

Personal information
- Full name: Alexandru Ștefan Pașcanu
- Date of birth: 28 September 1998 (age 28)
- Place of birth: Bârlad, Romania
- Height: 1.87 m (6 ft 2 in)
- Position: Defender

Team information
- Current team: Rapid București
- Number: 5

Youth career
- 2007–2019: Leicester City

Senior career*
| Years | Team | Apps | (Gls) |
| 2019–2022 | CFR Cluj | 4 | (0) |
| 2020 | → Voluntari (loan) | 19 | (1) |
| 2020–2022 | → Ponferradina (loan) | 53 | (1) |
| 2022–2024 | Ponferradina | 52 | (4) |
| 2023–2024 | → Sporting Gijón (loan) | 26 | (1) |
| 2024– | Rapid București | 71 | (9) |

International career^{‡}
| 2016 | Romania U18 | 1 | (0) |
| 2016–2017 | Romania U19 | 6 | (1) |
| 2017–2021 | Romania U21 | 29 | (1) |
| 2021 | Romania Olympic | 5 | (0) |
| 2024– | Romania | 1 | (0) |
- * Club domestic league appearances and goals as of 7 November 2026 ‡ National team caps and goals as of 18 November 2024

Alexandru Ștefan Pașcanu (born 28 September 1998) is a Romanian professional footballer who plays as a defender for Liga I club Rapid București.

== Early life ==
Pașcanu grew up in Bogdănești, Vaslui County, before moving to England with his family where he spent the rest of his childhood and teenage years.

== Club career ==
Pașcanu began his football career in the academy of Leicester City, playing alongside the likes of Ben Chilwell, Harvey Barnes and Hamza Choudhury. He was however unable to follow them into the first-team squad, and on 30 August 2019 returned to Romania to sign with reigning champions CFR Cluj for an undisclosed fee.

Pașcanu only amassed five appearances for "the White-Burgundies", before joining fellow Liga I side Voluntari in January 2020 on a loan deal until the end of the season. On 28 August 2020, he was sent out on a two-year loan to Spanish Segunda División side Ponferradina.

On 17 January 2022, Ponferradina announced it had reached an agreement with his parent club for the permanent transfer of Pașcanu. On 12 August 2023, after Ponfe's relegation, he was loaned to Sporting de Gijón also in the second division, for one year.

On 29 July 2024, Pașcanu returned again to his native country, signing a two-year-contract with Rapid București.

== International career ==
Pașcanu started in all but one of Romania under-21's ten qualifying matches for the 2019 European Championship as the nation won its group undefeated. His performances led to a first call-up to the senior team, on 11 November 2018. In the final stage of the under-21 tournament hosted by Italy and San Marino, Pașcanu aided his side in reaching the semi-finals and thus qualified the country to the 2020 Summer Olympics.

His age also made him eligible for the 2021 edition of the European Championship, where he played in all three group stage matches. Pașcanu scored the winner in a 2–1 defeat of Hungary and surpassed Ionuț Luțu to become the most capped player at under-21 level. In July that year, he went on to participate with Romania in the postponed Summer Olympics.

Pașcanu made his debut for Romania national team on 18 November 2024 in a Nations League game against Cyprus at the Arena Națională. He played a full game in Romania's 4–1 victory.

== Career statistics ==
=== Club ===
As of match played 7 November 2026

Appearances and goals by club, season and competition
| Club | Season | League | | | National cup (Note: Includes Cupa României, Copa del Rey) | | Europe | | Other | | Total | |
| Club | Season | Division | Apps | Goals | Apps | Goals | Apps | Goals | Apps | Goals | Apps | Goals |
|---|---|---|---|---|---|---|---|---|---|---|---|---|
| CFR Cluj | 2019–20 | Liga I | 4 | 0 | 1 | 0 | 0 | 0 | — | | 5 | 0 |
| Voluntari (loan) | 2019–20 | Liga I | 19 | 1 | — | | — | | — | | 19 | 1 |
| Ponferradina (loan) | 2020–21 | Segunda División | 33 | 1 | 1 | 0 | — | | — | | 34 | 1 |
| Ponferradina (loan) | 2021–22 | Segunda División | 36 | 2 | 1 | 0 | — | | — | | 37 | 2 |
| Ponferradina (loan) | Total | | 69 | 3 | 2 | 0 | — | | — | | 71 | 3 |
| Ponferradina | 2022–23 | Segunda División | 36 | 2 | 0 | 0 | — | | — | | 36 | 2 |
| Sporting Gijón (loan) | 2023–24 | Segunda División | 26 | 1 | 0 | 0 | — | | — | | 26 | 1 |
| Rapid București | 2024–25 | Liga I | 32 | 3 | 3 | 0 | — | | — | | 35 | 3 |
| Rapid București | 2025–26 | Liga I | 29 | 4 | 1 | 1 | — | | — | | 30 | 5 |
| Rapid București | 2026–27 | Liga I | 10 | 2 | 0 | 0 | — | | — | | 10 | 2 |
| Rapid București | Total | | 71 | 9 | 4 | 1 | — | | — | | 75 | 10 |
| Career total | | | 225 | 16 | 7 | 1 | 0 | 0 | 0 | 0 | 232 | 17 |

=== International ===
As of match played 18 November 2024

Appearances and goals by national team and year
| National team | Year | Apps | Goals |
|---|---|---|---|
Romania
| Romania | 2024 | 1 | 0 |
| Total | | 1 | 0 |

== Honours ==
CFR Cluj

- Liga I: 2019–20

Individual

- Leicester City U23 Player of the Season: 2016–17

== See also ==
- List of foreign Segunda División players
