= Manu Hernando =

Spanish footballer

Personal information
- Full name: José Manuel Hernando Riol
- Date of birth: 19 July 1998 (age 28)
- Place of birth: Palencia, Spain
- Height: 1.83 m (6 ft 0 in)
- Position: Centre-back

Team information
- Current team: Racing Santander
- Number: 4

Youth career
- 2004–2010: CIA
- 2010–2017: Real Madrid

Senior career*
Years	Team	Apps	(Gls)
2017–2021	Real Madrid B	44	(3)
2020	→ Racing Santander (loan)	15	(1)
2020–2021	→ Ponferradina (loan)	14	(0)
2021–2023	Tondela	55	(4)
2023–2024	Amorebieta	22	(2)
2024–	Racing Santander	71	(2)

International career
2016	Spain U19	2	(0)
2020	Spain U21	2	(0)
- * Club domestic league appearances and goals as of 16 August 2026

José Manuel "Manu" Hernando Riol (born 19 July 1998) is a Spanish professional footballer who plays as a central defender for Racing de Santander.

== Club career ==
Born in Palencia, Castile and León, Hernando joined Real Madrid's La Fábrica in 2010, from Club Internacional de la Amistad. Initially an attacking midfielder, he was converted into a central defender during his formation, and signed a five-year contract in March 2014.

Promoted to the reserves for the 2017–18 season, Hernando made his senior debut on 8 October 2017, starting in a 0–2 Segunda División B away loss against Pontevedra CF. He scored his first goal for Castilla on 18 November, netting the opener in a 1–1 home draw against CD Toledo.

A regular starter under Santiago Solari, Hernando spent the first months of the 2018–19 campaign out due to a knee injury, but still renewed his contract until 2022 on 15 November 2018. The following 2 January, he joined Segunda División's Racing de Santander on loan until June.

Hernando made his professional debut on 24 January 2020, coming on as a substitute for Nico Hidalgo in a 0–1 away loss against Cádiz CF. He scored his first professional goal on 7 March, netting his team's second in a 2–1 win at CD Numancia.

On 14 August 2020, Hernando was loaned to fellow second division side SD Ponferradina for the season. On 16 July of the following year, he moved abroad and signed a two-year contract with C.D. Tondela of the Portuguese Primeira Liga.

On 10 July 2023, Hernando returned to his home country after signing a contract with SD Amorebieta, newly-promoted to division two. The following 1 February, he returned to Racing after agreeing to an 18-month deal.

On 6 November 2024, Hernando renewed his link with the Verdiblancos until 2028, and was regularly used in the following years, helping the club to achieve promotion to La Liga as champions in 2026. He made his top tier debut on 16 August of that year, replacing injured Pedro Felipe in a 2–2 home draw against Villarreal CF.

== Career statistics ==
=== Club ===
As of match played 24 May 2026

Appearances and goals by club, season and competition
Club	Season	League			National Cup		League Cup		Continental		Other		Total	
Club	Season	Division	Apps	Goals	Apps	Goals	Apps	Goals	Apps	Goals	Apps	Goals	Apps	Goals
Real Madrid B	2017–18	Segunda División B	23	2	—		—		—		—		23	2
Real Madrid B	2018–19	Segunda División B	18	1	—		—		—		—		18	1
Real Madrid B	2019–20	Segunda División B	3	0	—		—		—		—		3	0
Real Madrid B	Total		44	3	—		—		—		—		44	3
Real Madrid	2017–18	La Liga	0	0	0	0	—		0	0	0	0	0	0
Racing Santander (loan)	2019–20	Segunda División	15	1	—		—		—		—		15	1
Ponferradina (loan)	2020–21	Segunda División	14	0	1	0	—		—		—		15	0
Tondela	2021–22	Primeira Liga	23	3	5	2	0	0	—		—		28	52
Tondela	2022–23	Primeira Liga	32	1	2	0	4	0	—		1	0	39	1
Tondela	Total		55	4	7	2	4	0	—		1	0	67	3
Amorebieta	2023–24	Segunda División	22	2	1	0	—		—		—		23	2
Racing Santander	2023–24	Segunda División	18	1	—		—		—		—		18	1
Racing Santander	2024–25	Segunda División	27	0	2	0	—		—		1	0	30	0
Racing Santander	2025–26	Segunda División	25	1	4	0	—		—		—		29	1
Racing Santander	Total		70	2	6	0	—		—		1	0	77	2
Career total			220	12	15	2	4	0	0	0	2	0	241	8

== Honours ==
Racing Santander

- Segunda División: 2025–26
