= Luis Valcarce =

Spanish footballer

Personal information
- Full name: Luis Valcarce Vidal
- Date of birth: 3 February 1993 (age 33)
- Place of birth: Ponferrada, Spain
- Height: 1.75 m (5 ft 9 in)
- Position: Left-back

Youth career
- Ponferradina
- 2011–2012: Numancia

Senior career*
Years	Team	Apps	(Gls)
2011	Ponferradina B	4	(0)
2012–2015	Numancia B	60	(9)
2013–2019	Numancia	98	(1)
2019–2020	Ponferradina	25	(0)
2021–2022	Arka Gdynia	26	(0)
2022	Alcorcón	5	(0)
2022–2023	Badajoz	7	(0)
2023–2024	Real Avilés	6	(0)
- * Club domestic league appearances and goals as of 10:22, 3 February 2024 (UTC)

Luis Valcarce Vidal (born 3 February 1993) is a former Spanish professional footballer. Throughout his career he mainly played left-back, but could also play as a left winger.

== Club career ==
Born in Ponferrada, Castile and León, Valcarce began his career with hometown club SD Ponferradina, making his senior debut with the reserves. In 2011 he moved to CD Numancia, being initially assigned to the youth setup and being promoted to the B team after one year.

On 17 August 2013, Valcarce played his first professional match, coming on as a second-half substitute in a 0–0 away draw against CD Lugo in the Segunda División. On 30 January 2015, both he – injured at the time – and his twin brother Pablo renewed their contract with the Rojillos, until 2017.

Valcarce was promoted to the main squad on 20 August 2015, being assigned the no. 14 jersey. He left in June 2019 after his contract expired, and the following month returned to his first club Ponferradina.

On 29 January 2022, after spending the second part of the 2020–21 season and the first part of the following in the Polish I liga with Arka Gdynia, Valcarce returned to Spain and joined second-tier AD Alcorcón on a short-term deal.
