= Luis Vasquez =

Luis Vasquez may refer to:

- Luis Vasquez (American football) (born 1986), American football defensive linesman
- Luis Vásquez (footballer) (born 1996), Colombian football goalkeeper
- Luis Vasquez, better known by his stage name The Soft Moon, American musician

== See also ==
- Luis Vázquez (disambiguation)
- Lucho (footballer, born 2003), born Luis Fernando Vásquez Díaz, Colombian football defender
