= Mate Ghvinianidze =

Georgian footballer (born 1986)

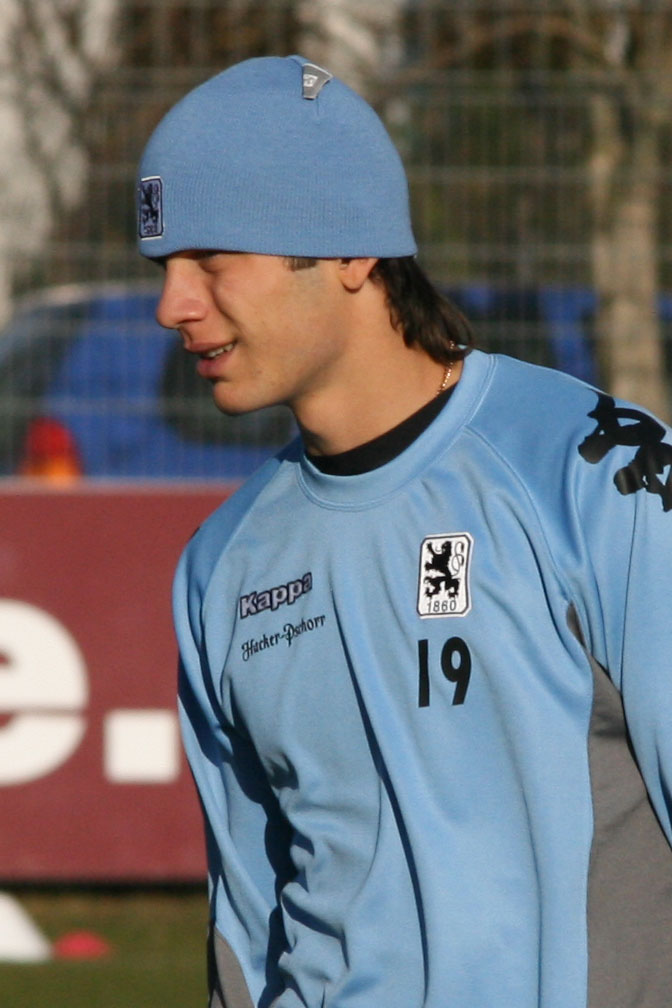
- Ghvinianidze in 2007

Personal information
- Full name: Mate Ghvinianidze
- Date of birth: 10 December 1986 (age 39)
- Place of birth: Tbilisi, Georgian SSR, Soviet Union
- Height: 1.86 m (6 ft 1 in)
- Position: Defender

Youth career
- 2002–2003: Norchi Dinamoeli
- 2004–2005: Dinamo Tbilisi

Senior career*
Years	Team	Apps	(Gls)
2003–2004	Norchi Dinamoeli	19	(2)
2005–2006	Lokomotiv-2 Moscow	17	(1)
2006–2010	1860 Munich	87	(1)
2011–2014	PFC Sevastopol	65	(2)
Total		188	(6)

International career
2004–2007	Georgia U21	12	(0)
2006–2009	Georgia	8	(0)
- * Club domestic league appearances and goals

Mate Ghvinianidze (Georgian: მათე ღვინიანიძე; born 10 December 1986) is a Georgian former professional footballer who played as a defender.

Ghvinianidze played three friendlies in 2006 before playing twice in the UEFA Euro 2008 qualifying.
