= Beka Gotsiridze =

Georgian footballer (1988–2026)

Personal information
- Date of birth: 21 February 1988
- Place of birth: Tbilisi, Georgian SSR, USSR
- Date of death: 8 February 2026 (aged 37)
- Height: 1.70 m (5 ft 7 in)
- Position: Forward

Senior career*
Years	Team	Apps	(Gls)
2003–2004	Ameri Tbilisi	22	(2)
2004–2008	FC Zestaponi	68	(11)
2009–2012	Dnipro Dnipropetrovsk	3	(0)
2010–2011	→ Kryvbas Kryvyi Rih (on loan)	5	(0)
2013	Dila Gori	0	(0)
2014	FC Sasco	0	(0)
2015–2016	Merani Martvili	1	(0)

International career
2005–2007	Georgia U19	8	(3)
2006–2008	Georgia U20	6	(3)
2005–2008	Georgia U21	19	(9)
2008–2009	Georgia	12	(1)
- * Club domestic league appearances and goals

Beka Gotsiridze (Georgian: ბექა გოცირიძე; 21 February 1988 – 8 February 2026) was a Georgian footballer who played as a forward.

== Career ==
Gotsiridze was born in Tbilisi, Georgian SSR, Soviet Union on 21 February 1988. He began his career at FC Zestaponi, in Georgia's Umaglesi Liga before his transfer to Dnipro Dnipropetrovsk on a €1 million deal in January 2009.

In June 2009, he was involved in a car accident while driving to Tbilisi, Georgia from a nearby village. His spleen had to be removed due to his injuries.

His health condition did not allow Gotsiridze to play in highly ambitious clubs any longer. Although later he was a squad member of several Georgian teams such as Dila Gori, Merani Martvili, Racha Ambrolauri and Gareji Sagarejo, the career of this player ended prematurely.

== Later life and death ==
As of the summer 2022, Gotsiridze lived in the United States.

On 16 August 2025, during 2024–2026 protests two people were arrested and charged with group violence for allegedly assaulting Gotsiridze, a hardline Georgian Dream supporter, during a 31 July rally on Rustaveli Avenue. While the defendants face up to two years in prison, the defense argues that Gotsiridze provoked the clash by broadcasting a derogatory livestream and, as some activists claim, arriving at the protest armed with a knife. Despite these tensions, Gotsiridze testified on 17 December that he felt no significant pain and requested that the defendants be released on bail to spend the New Year with their families; however, the judge denied this request and ordered that they remain in custody.

On 8 February 2026, Gotsiridze's friends shared on social media that he had died, with some reports suggesting he was found dead at his home under unknown circumstances. He was 37.
