= Talgat Sabalakov =

Kazakhstani footballer

Personal information
- Full name: Talgat Sabalakov
- Date of birth: 9 July 1986 (age 40)
- Place of birth: Aktau, Kazakh SSR
- Height: 1.77 m (5 ft 10 in)
- Positions: Midfielder; winger

Team information
- Current team: Caspiy
- Number: 25

Youth career
- Caspiy

Senior career*
Years	Team	Apps	(Gls)
2003–2006	Caspiy	?	(22)
2007–2008	Tobol	28	(5)
2009	Okzhetpes	13	(1)
2010	Zhetysu	3	(0)
2010	Kairat	6	(1)
2011	Sunkar	6	(1)
2011–	Caspiy	24	(4)

International career^{‡}
2008	Kazakhstan	1	(0)
- * Club domestic league appearances and goals as of 12 July 2012 ‡ National team caps and goals as of 12 July 2012

Talgat Sabalakov (Kazakh: Талғат Сабалақов) is a Kazakhstani football midfielder. He plays for the club FC Caspiy in First Division.

== Club career stats ==
Last update: 12 July 2012

Club	Season	League		Cup		Europe		Total	
Club	Season	Apps	Goals	Apps	Goals	Apps	Goals	Apps	Goals
Caspiy	2003	?	1	?	-	-	-	?	1
Caspiy	2004	?	5	?	-	-	-	?	5
Caspiy	2005	?	2	?	-	-	-	?	2
Caspiy	2006	?	14	-	-	-	-	?	14
Tobol	2007	19	4	5	1	2	-	26	5
Tobol	2008	9	1	4	3	1	-	14	4
Okzhetpes	2009	13	1	3	-	-	-	16	1
Zhetysu	2010	3	-	-	-	-	-	3	-
Kairat	2010	6	1	-	-	-	-	6	1
Sunkar	2011	6	1	1	-	-	-	7	1
Caspiy	2011	14	3	-	-	-	-	14	3
Caspiy	2012	10	1	-	-	-	-	10	1
Career Total		80	34	13	4	3	0	96	38

== Honours ==
- Intertoto Cup Winner: 2007
- Kazakhstan League Runner-up: 2007, 2008
- Kazakhstan Cup Winner: 2007
