= Juan Manuel Fuentes (footballer) =

Spanish footballer

Personal information
- Full name: Juan Manuel Fuentes Fernández
- Date of birth: 13 November 1977 (age 48)
- Place of birth: Ordes, Spain
- Height: 1.78 m (5 ft 10 in)
- Position: Wing-back

Senior career*
Years	Team	Apps	(Gls)
1996–1997	Compostela B		
1997–1999	Ponferradina B		
1999–2010	Ponferradina	283	(4)
- * Club domestic league appearances and goals

Juan Manuel Fuentes Fernández (born 13 November 1977) is a Spanish former footballer. On the left side of the pitch, he could appear as either a defender or a midfielder.

== Club career ==
Born in Ordes, Province of A Coruña, Fuentes spent his entire professional career, which consisted of 11 seasons, with SD Ponferradina. In 2005–06, he started in all his 28 league appearances to help the Galicians be promoted to Segunda División for the first time in their history.

Fuentes played his first game as a professional on 27 August 2006 at the age of nearly 29, starting and being booked in a 2–0 away loss against Albacete Balompié. He again was first choice, but his team was relegated at the end of the campaign.

Fuentes retired in June 2010 aged 32, having contributed 14 matches as Ponfe returned to the second tier. He appeared in 319 competitive games during his tenure with the club.

== Honours ==
Ponferradina

- Segunda División B: 2009–10
