= Kandadji Sport =

Nigerien football club

- Full name: Kandadji Sport
- Ground: Stade Général Seyni Kountché; Niamey
- Capacity: 35,000
- League: Niger Premier League

Kandadji Sport is a Nigerien football club based in Niamey. The club plays in Niger Premier League.

== Stadium ==
Currently the team plays at the 35000 capacity Stade Général Seyni Kountché.
