= Herreruela de Oropesa =

Coordinates: 39°53′N 5°14′W

- municipality
- Flag Coat of arms
- Interactive map of Herreruela de Oropesa
- Country: Spain
- Autonomous community: Castile-La Mancha
- Province: Toledo
- Municipality: Herreruela de Oropesa

Area
  - Total: 10 km^{2} (3.9 sq mi)
- Elevation: 396 m (1,299 ft)

Population (2025-01-01)
  - Total: 323
  - Density: 32/km^{2} (84/sq mi)
- Time zone: UTC+1 (CET)
  - Summer (DST): UTC+2 (CEST)

Herreruela de Oropesa is a municipality located in the province of Toledo, Castile-La Mancha, Spain. According to the 2006 census (INE), the municipality has a population of 445 inhabitants.

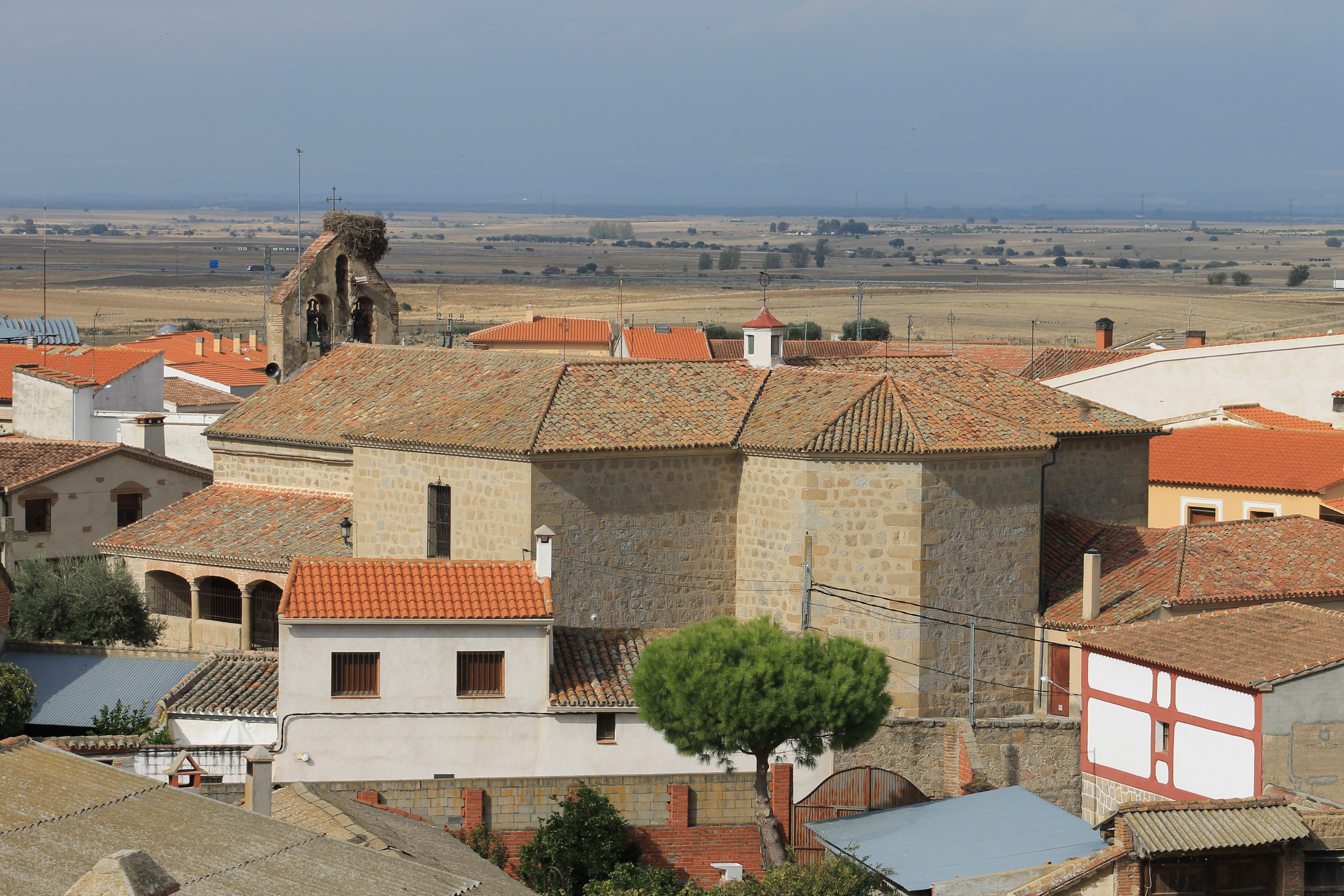
Herreruela Rooftops
