= Mauro Molina (Spanish footballer) =

Spanish footballer

Personal information
- Full name: Mauro Molina García
- Date of birth: 4 November 2001 (age 25)
- Place of birth: Camponaraya, Spain
- Position: Winger

Team information
- Current team: Ponferradina B
- Number: 9

Youth career
- Ponferradina
- 2019–2020: Numancia

Senior career*
Years	Team	Apps	(Gls)
2018–2019	Ponferradina B	5	(1)
2020–2021	Atlético Astorga	20	(0)
2021–	Ponferradina B	37	(17)
2021–	Ponferradina	1	(0)
- * Club domestic league appearances and goals as of 9 October 2022

Mauro Molina García (born 4 November 2001) is a Spanish footballer who plays as a winger for SD Ponferradina B.

== Club career ==
Born in Magaz de Abajo, Camponaraya, Castile and León, Molina was a SD Ponferradina youth graduate, and made his senior debut with the reserves during the 2018–19 season, in the regional leagues. In the 2019 summer, he moved to CD Numancia and returned to youth setup.

On 28 July 2020, Molina joined Tercera División side Atlético Astorga FC. He featured sparingly before returning to Ponfe and their B-side in 2021.

Molina made his first team debut on 31 December 2021, coming on as a late substitute for Kike Saverio in a 0–2 Segunda División away loss against Real Oviedo.
