= Erik Morán =

Spanish footballer

Personal information
- Full name: Erik Morán Arribas
- Date of birth: 25 May 1991 (age 35)
- Place of birth: Portugalete, Spain
- Height: 1.87 m (6 ft 1 1/2 in)
- Position: Defensive midfielder

Team information
- Current team: Ponferradina
- Number: 24

Youth career
- 2004–2009: Athletic Bilbao

Senior career*
Years	Team	Apps	(Gls)
2009–2010	Basconia	29	(7)
2009–2013	Bilbao Athletic	78	(5)
2012–2016	Athletic Bilbao	17	(0)
2015	→ Leganés (loan)	17	(0)
2015–2016	→ Zaragoza (loan)	35	(0)
2016–2017	Zaragoza	15	(0)
2017	Leganés	18	(0)
2018–2019	AEK Athens	11	(0)
2019	→ Málaga (loan)	8	(0)
2020	Numancia	13	(0)
2020–2023	Ponferradina	97	(1)
2023–2024	Amorebieta	32	(0)
2024–2025	Andorra	18	(1)
2026–	Ponferradina	5	(0)

International career
2008	Spain U17	2	(0)
2009	Spain U18	3	(0)
2009	Spain U19	1	(0)
- * Club domestic league appearances and goals as of 25 May 2026

Erik Morán Arribas (born 25 May 1991) is a Spanish professional footballer who plays as a defensive midfielder for Primera Federación club Ponferradina.

== Club career ==
Born in Portugalete, Biscay, Morán joined Athletic Bilbao's youth setup in 2004, aged 13. On 28 November 2012 he made his debut with the first team, starting in a 2–0 away win against Hapoel Ironi Kiryat Shmona F.C. in that season's UEFA Europa League. He played his first game in La Liga the following 14 April, coming on as an 80th-minute substitute for Iker Muniain in the 0–3 home loss to Real Madrid.

Morán was promoted to Athletic's main squad in August 2013, signing an extension until 2016 and being handed the number 5 shirt. On 29 January 2015, he was loaned to Segunda División's CD Leganés until June.

On 23 July 2015, Morán moved to Real Zaragoza in a one-year loan deal. On 1 July of the following year, he agreed to a permanent two-year contract with the club as Athletic opted to not recall him after the loan expired.

On 31 January 2017, Morán returned to Leganés, who now competed in the top flight. Roughly one year later, in another winter transfer market move, he signed a three-and-a-half-year contract at Super League Greece side AEK Athens F.C. for €130,000 and a resale rate of 10%, being brought in as a replacement for seriously injured Jakob Johansson. He left in December 2019, having contributed seven appearances to the 2017–18 Greek champions and totalling 19.

Morán went back to Spain in January 2020, signing a short-term deal with CD Numancia in the second division. On 28 August, after being relegated, he joined SD Ponferradina of the same league.

On 4 July 2023, following his team's relegation, Morán remained in the second tier with SD Amorebieta. He moved down to Primera Federación in summer 2024, on a contract at FC Andorra that was mutually terminated in September 2025.

Morán remained in the third tier subsequently, with Ponferradina.

== Honours ==
AEK Athens

- Super League Greece: 2017–18
