= José Amo =

Spanish footballer

Personal information
- Full name: José María Amo Torres
- Date of birth: 9 April 1998 (age 28)
- Place of birth: Las Pajanosas, Spain
- Height: 1.81 m (5 ft 11 in)
- Position: Centre-back

Team information
- Current team: Gimnàstic

Youth career
- Las Pajanosas
- 2006–2017: Sevilla
- 2007: → Motilla (loan)

Senior career*
Years	Team	Apps	(Gls)
2016–2020	Sevilla B	50	(1)
2020–2023	Ponferradina	98	(4)
2023–2025	Tenerife	32	(0)
2025–2026	Lugo	32	(1)
2026–	Gimnàstic	0	(0)

International career
2014	Spain U16	2	(0)
2014–2015	Spain U17	15	(2)
2016	Spain U18	2	(0)
2015–2017	Spain U19	9	(0)
2019	Spain U21	3	(0)
- * Club domestic league appearances and goals as of 9 June 2026

José María Amo Torres (born 9 April 1998) is a Spanish professional footballer who plays as a central defender for Gimnàstic de Tarragona.

== Club career ==
=== Sevilla ===
Born in Las Pajanosas, Seville, Andalusia, Amo joined Sevilla FC's youth setup in 2006, aged eight; originally a central midfielder, he subsequently changed to a central defender. On 4 October 2015, aged only 17, he made his senior debut for the reserves by starting in a 1–1 away draw against Marbella FC in the Segunda División B. Late in the year, British newspaper The Guardian named him as one of the fifty most talented youth soccer players in the world.

Amo contributed with six appearances during the campaign, as Sevilla Atlético achieved promotion to Segunda División. On 15 June 2016, despite having suffered a partially torn anterior cruciate ligament on the right knee, he renewed his contract until 2019.

On 21 February 2017, Amo scored two spot-kicks for nine-men Sevilla under-19s in the Round of 16 of the 2016–17 UEFA Youth League, giving his side the lead before they ultimately lost 2–3. Amo made his professional debut with the B-team on 19 March, coming on as a late substitute for Marc Gual in a 2–1 away win against Real Zaragoza; after Fabrice Ondoa was sent off, he featured as the club's goalkeeper for the last minutes, keeping a clean sheet.

Amo tore his meniscus and once again suffered cruciate ligament damage on his right knee on 10 December 2017, being sidelined for seven months. Despite being injured, Amo was nominated for the 2018 Golden Boy.

With the B-team down to eight men, Amo scored his first senior goal on 23 February 2019, netting the winning penalty in the 85 minute of a 2–1 away win against Club Recreativo Granada. On 7 May, after contributing with 26 matches during the campaign, he renewed his contract with the Nervionenses for one more season; ahead of the 2019–20 season, he was named team captain.

=== Ponferradina ===
On 6 August 2020, free agent Amo signed for SD Ponferradina in the second division. He scored his first professional goal on 11 January of the following year, netting the equalizer in a 1–1 home draw against Girona FC.

On 3 June 2022, after establishing himself as a starter, Amo renewed his contract with Ponfe. He remained a first-choice during the campaign, as the club suffered relegation.

=== Tenerife ===
On 12 July 2023, Amo signed a three-year deal with CD Tenerife also in division two. Regularly used in his first year, he suffered another knee injury in July 2024 which prevented him to feature in the entire 2024–25 season, which ended in relegation.

=== Lugo ===
On 8 July 2025, Amo was announced at Primera Federación side CD Lugo. He was regularly used during the campaign, scoring once in 32 matches.

=== Gimnàstic ===
On 19 June 2026, Amo agreed to a two-year contract with fellow third division side Gimnàstic de Tarragona.

== Personal life ==
The son of a mayor, Amo would have become a bullfighter had he not become a footballer.
