= Paris Adot =

Spanish footballer (born 1990)

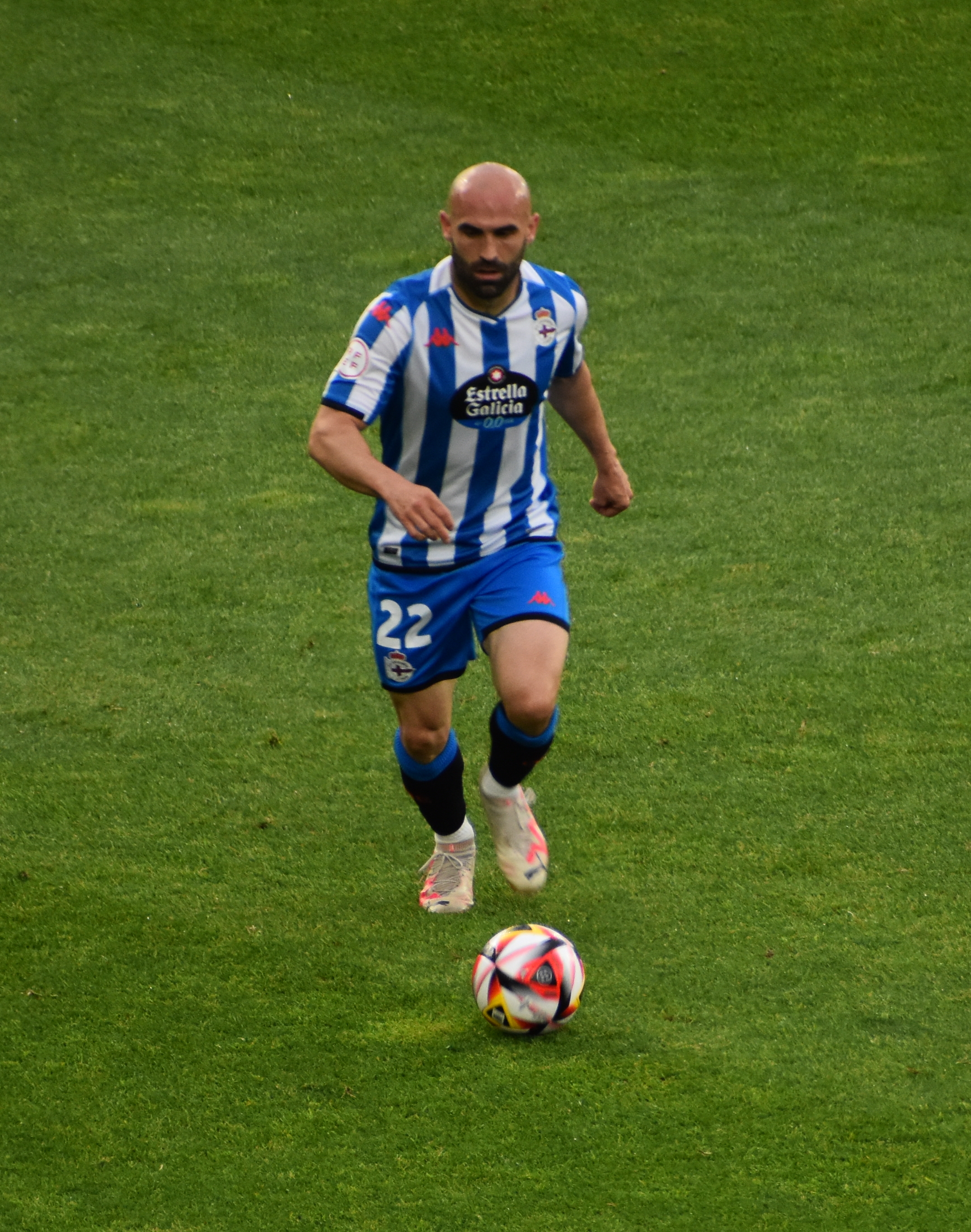
- Adot in 2024

Personal information
- Full name: Paris Alejandro Adot Barandiaran
- Date of birth: 26 February 1990 (age 36)
- Place of birth: Pamplona, Spain
- Height: 1.80 m (5 ft 11 in)
- Position: Right-back

Team information
- Current team: Algeciras
- Number: 22

Youth career
- Lagunak

Senior career*
Years	Team	Apps	(Gls)
2009–2010	Lagunak		
2010–2011	Cádiz B	32	(4)
2011–2012	Mutilvera	36	(7)
2012–2013	Izarra	34	(2)
2013–2014	Osasuna B	32	(0)
2014–2015	Izarra	36	(4)
2015–2016	Tudelano	36	(5)
2016–2017	Murcia	12	(0)
2017	Sabadell	10	(1)
2017–2019	Mirandés	73	(3)
2019–2020	Alcorcón	26	(0)
2020–2023	Ponferradina	107	(3)
2023–2024	Deportivo La Coruña	24	(0)
2024–	Algeciras	62	(2)
- * Club domestic league appearances and goals as of 10 June 2026

Paris Alejandro Adot Barandiaran (born 26 February 1990) is a Spanish professional footballer who plays as a right-back for Algeciras.

== Career ==
Born in Pamplona, Navarre, Adot made his senior debut with SD Lagunak in the 2009–10 season, in the regional leagues. In 2010 he joined Cádiz CF, being assigned to the reserves in Tercera División.

In 2012, after playing as a winger for UD Mutilvera and scoring a career-best seven goals, Adot signed for CD Izarra in Segunda División B. On 30 June 2013, he moved to another reserve team, CA Osasuna B in division four.

On 1 September 2014, Adot returned to Izarra, with the side now in the fourth division. The following 3 July, he moved to CD Tudelano in the third level, and continued to appear in the category in the following three seasons, representing Real Murcia, CE Sabadell FC and CD Mirandés; with the latter, he achieved promotion to Segunda División in 2019.

On 4 July 2019, free agent Adot agreed to a two-year deal with second division side AD Alcorcón. He made his professional debut on 18 August, starting in a 1–0 away defeat of CD Numancia.

On 24 August 2020, Adot terminated his contract with the Alfareros, and signed for fellow league team SD Ponferradina the following day.

On 30 June 2023, following Ponferradina's relegation, Adot joined Primera Federación side, Deportivo La Coruña on a two-year contract. Roughly one year later, after helping Dépor in their promotion to the second division, he left the club.

On 10 August 2024, Adot signed with Algeciras in the third tier.
