= Camponaraya =

- Flag Coat of arms

- Location within Spain
- Coordinates: 42°34′50″N 6°40′13″W
- Country: Spain
- Autonomous community: Castile and León
- Province: León
- Comarca: El Bierzo
- Municipality: Camponaraya

Government
  - Mayor: Antonio Canedo Aller (PSOE)

Area
  - Total: 29.13 km^{2} (11.25 sq mi)
- Elevation: 489 m (1,604 ft)

Population (2025-01-01)
  - Total: 4,060
  - Density: 139/km^{2} (361/sq mi)
- Time zone: UTC+1 (CET)
  - Summer (DST): UTC+2 (CEST)
- Postal Code: 24410
- Telephone prefix: 987
- Climate: Csb
- Website: Ayto. de Camponaraya

Camponaraya (Spanish pronunciation: [kamponaˈɾaʝa]) (Campunaraya in Leonese language) is a village and municipality located in the region of El Bierzo (the province of León, Castile and León, Spain) . According to the 2025 census (INE), the municipality has a population of 4,060 inhabitants.

== Symbols ==
The flag is rectangular with proportions of 2:3. It consists of five horizontal stripes in alternating proportions of 5/17 and 1/17 with the outer stripes in blue, the intermediate ones in white, and the central stripe in red featuring five white scallop shells.
