= Carlos Bravo (footballer) =

Spanish footballer (born 1993)

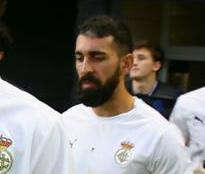

Personal information
- Full name: Carlos Bravo Expósito
- Date of birth: 14 January 1993 (age 33)
- Place of birth: Madrid, Spain
- Height: 1.74 m (5 ft 9 in)
- Position: Winger

Team information
- Current team: CD Badajoz
- Number: 17

Youth career
- 2000–2002: Vicálvaro
- 2002–2007: Rayo Vallecano
- 2007–2012: Real Madrid

Senior career*
Years	Team	Apps	(Gls)
2012	Real Madrid C	1	(0)
2012–2013	Moscardó	31	(7)
2013–2014	Parla	32	(5)
2014–2016	Internacional Madrid	41	(10)
2015–2017	Móstoles	35	(11)
2017–2018	Conquense	36	(16)
2018–2019	Unión Adarve	17	(6)
2019–2020	Ponferradina	27	(5)
2020	→ Rayo Majadahonda (loan)	3	(2)
2020–2021	Cultural Leonesa	23	(4)
2021–2023	Real Unión	56	(12)
2023-2024	Águilas	12	(0)
2024	UD Logroñés	17	(5)
2024–2025	Melilla	29	(3)
2025–2026	Fuenlabrada	2	(0)
2026–	CD Badajoz		(0)
- * Club domestic league appearances and goals as of 21 September 2025

Carlos Bravo Expósito (born 14 January 1993) is a Spanish footballer who plays for Tercera Federación club CD Badajoz as a right winger.

== Club career ==
Bravo was born in Madrid, and finished his formation with Real Madrid. He made his senior debut with the C-team on 13 May 2012, starting in a 2–3 Tercera División home loss against CF Trival Valderas.

Bravo continued to appear in the fourth division the following six campaigns, representing CDC Moscardó, AD Parla, Internacional de Madrid, CD Móstoles URJC and UB Conquense. On 6 August 2018, after a period on trial at CF Rayo Majadahonda, he signed for AD Unión Adarve in Segunda División B.

On 28 December 2018, Bravo joined SD Ponferradina still in the third division. He contributed with five goals in 17 appearances for the club during the campaign, helping in their return to Segunda División after three years.

Bravo made his professional debut on 25 August 2019, starting in a 1–1 home draw against Real Zaragoza. The following 18 February, he was loaned to CF Rayo Majadahonda until the end of the season, as a cover to injured Iago Díaz.

On 5 October 2020, Bravo terminated his contract with Ponfe, and agreed to a contract with third tier side Cultural y Deportiva Leonesa just hours later. In July 2021, Bravo joined Real Unión on a two-year deal with an option for a third year.
