= Kaxe (footballer) =

Spanish footballer

Personal information
- Full name: Álex Aizpuru Aizbitarte
- Date of birth: 21 January 1994 (age 32)
- Place of birth: Azpeitia, Spain
- Height: 1.84 m (6 ft 0 in)
- Position: Forward

Team information
- Current team: Inter Escaldes
- Number: 9

Youth career
- Lagun Onak

Senior career*
Years	Team	Apps	(Gls)
2013–2014	Lagun Onak B		
2014–2016	Lagun Onak	70	(10)
2016–2017	Vitoria	27	(1)
2017–2018	Beasain	16	(11)
2018	Rápido Bouzas	17	(6)
2018	East Riffa	?	(1)
2019–2022	Ponferradina	88	(11)
2021–2022	→ Sabadell (loan)	33	(8)
2022–2023	Atlético Baleares	15	(1)
2023	Ibiza	13	(1)
2024	Sestao River	16	(3)
2024–2025	Amorebieta	22	(2)
2025–	Inter Escaldes	18	(4)
- * Club domestic league appearances and goals as of 10 June 2026

Álex Aizpuru Aizbitarte (born 21 January 1994), commonly known as Kaxe, is a Spanish footballer who plays for Andorran club Inter Escaldes. Mainly a forward, he can also play as a winger.

== Club career ==
Born in Azpeitia, Gipuzkoa, Basque Country, Kaxe represented CD Lagun Onak as a youth, and made his senior debut with the B-team in the 2013–14 season, in the regional leagues. He subsequently started to feature for the first team in Tercera División, helping the side to achieve their best-ever campaign in 2015–16.

In July 2016, Kaxe joined SD Eibar and was assigned to the farm team also in the fourth division. In the following year, after achieving promotion, he moved to fellow league team SD Beasain, scoring on a regular basis for the latter side.

On 3 January 2018, Kaxe signed for Segunda División B side Rápido de Bouzas. On 17 July, he moved abroad and agreed to a one-year deal with East Riffa Club in Bahrain.

On 16 December 2018, Kaxe returned to his home country and signed for SD Ponferradina in the third level. He became an immediate starter, contributing with three goals in 18 appearances during the season as his side returned to Segunda División after a three-year absence.

Kaxe made his professional debut on 18 August 2019, starting in a 1–3 away loss against Cádiz CF. He scored his first goal in the second division on 1 September, netting the third in a 4–0 home routing of CD Tenerife.

On 20 November 2019, Kaxe renewed his contract with Ponfe until 2023. On 28 August 2021, he moved to Primera División RFEF side CE Sabadell FC on loan for one year.

On 16 August 2022, Kaxe signed a one-year contract with CD Atlético Baleares in the third division. The following 4 January, he returned to the second level after agreeing to a short-term deal with UD Ibiza.

On 12 July 2024, Kaxe moved to Amorebieta in the third tier.
