= Yuri (footballer, born 1982) =

Brazilian footballer

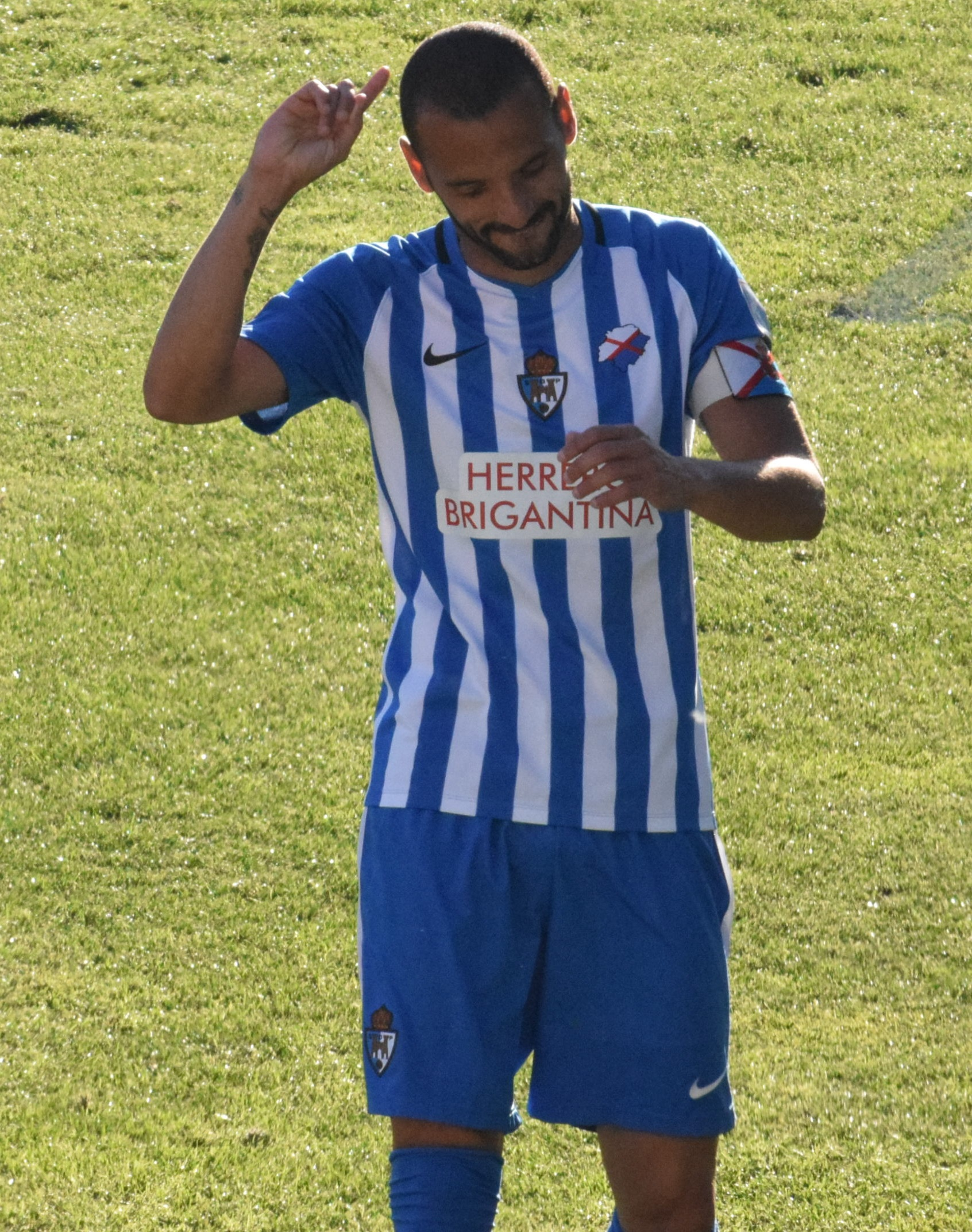
- Yuri in action for Ponferradina in 2019

Personal information
- Full name: Yuri de Souza Fonseca
- Date of birth: 8 August 1982 (age 44)
- Place of birth: Maceió, Brazil
- Height: 1.86 m (6 ft 1 in)
- Position: Forward

Youth career
- 1990–1991: Marialvas
- 1994–1995: Gondim
- 1995–2000: Maia

Senior career*
Years	Team	Apps	(Gls)
2000–2002	Maia	57	(26)
2003–2005	Boavista	14	(3)
2004	→ Gil Vicente (loan)	15	(4)
2004–2005	→ Estoril (loan)	19	(3)
2005–2009	Pontevedra	98	(55)
2007–2008	→ Las Palmas (loan)	12	(0)
2009–2016	Ponferradina	216	(85)
2016	Qingdao Huanghai	30	(10)
2017–2024	Ponferradina	257	(99)
Total		718	(285)
- * Club domestic league appearances and goals

Yuri de Souza Fonseca (born 8 August 1982), known simply as Yuri, is a Brazilian former professional footballer who played as a forward.

He also held Portuguese citizenship, and spent the majority of his 24-year career in Portugal and Spain, mainly with Ponferradina. Over ten seasons in the latter country, he achieved Segunda División figures of 323 games and 116 goals.

== Club career ==
Born in Maceió, Alagoas, Yuri arrived in Portugal still in his teens, joining Maia in the Segunda Liga. His performances there attracted the attention of another club in the north, Primeira Liga's Boavista, for which he signed in January 2003.

However, Yuri could never impose himself at the side, going on to serve two loans in the process. He helped Gil Vicente to avoid top-flight relegation in his five-month spell, not being able to repeat it with Estoril in the following season.

In summer 2005, Yuri moved to Iberian neighbours Spain, representing lowly Pontevedra. He also had a loan spell at Las Palmas in Segunda División, but only appeared in 12 matches out of 42 without scoring.

Yuri signed for Ponferradina in 2009, going on to achieve two promotions to the second tier during his spell– to which he contributed a total of 26 goals – and eventually becoming captain. In the 2012–13 campaign, he ranked third in the second division scorers' list at 21, helping his team to the seventh position.

On 15 January 2017, following a brief spell in the China League One, Yuri returned to the Estadio El Toralín aged 34. He scored in double digits in division two in 2019–20 (18 goals), 2020–21 (11) and 2021–22 (14).

Yuri totalled an all-time best for Ponferradina 511 appearances and 197 goals. He retired in August 2024 at 42, with the club now in the Primera Federación; he remained connected to it in directorial capacities.

== Personal life ==
Yuri's older brother, Igor, was also a footballer and a forward. They shared teams at Maia (where they arrived at a young age) and Pontevedra.

His cousin, Charles, also played several seasons in Spain and also represented Pontevedra.
