= SD Ponferradina B =

Spanish football club

Ponferradina B
- Full name: Sociedad Deportiva Ponferradina B
- Nicknames: La Ponfe, La Deportiva
- Founded: 1963 (as CF Endesa)
- Ground: Compostilla, Ponferrada, León, Spain
- Capacity: 6,000
- Chairman: José Fernández Nieto
- Manager: Rubén Vega
- League: Primera Regional – Group B
- 2025–26: Primera Regional – Group B, 9th of 16
Home colours	Away colours	Third colours

Sociedad Deportiva Ponferradina B is a Spanish football team based in Ponferrada, in the El Bierzo region, León, in the autonomous community of Castile and León. Founded in 1963 as Club de Fútbol Endesa de Ponferrada, it is the reserve team of SD Ponferradina and currently plays in Primera Regional – Group B, holding home games at Estadio Compostilla, which holds 6,000 spectators.

== History ==
Founded in 1963 as CF Endesa de Ponferrada, the club played in ten Tercera División seasons before merging into the structure of SD Ponferradina and subsequently changing their name to SD Ponferradina B. On 25 April 2013, Ponferradina announced the removal of its reserve team, Ponferradina B, due to running's high costs. At the same time, they signed a three-year affiliate agreement with CD Flores del Sil.

However, the agreement with Flores de Sil only lasted one season, and Ponferradina B returned to active status in 2014.

== Season to season ==
- As CF Endesa de Ponferrada

Season	Tier	Division	Place	Copa del Rey
1965–66	4	1ª Reg.	(R)	
1966–67	DNP			
1967–68	DNP			
1968–69	4	1ª Reg.	8th	
1969–70	4	1ª Reg.	4th	
1970–71	5	1ª Reg.	7th	
1971–72	DNP			
1972–73	DNP			
1973–74	5	1ª Reg.	3rd	
1974–1984	DNP			
1984–85	6	1ª Reg.	1st	
1985–86	5	Reg. Pref.	3rd	
1986–87	5	Reg. Pref.	2nd	

Season	Tier	Division	Place	Copa del Rey
1987–88	4	3ª	15th	
1988–89	4	3ª	15th	
1989–90	4	3ª	17th	
1990–91	4	3ª	12th	
1991–92	4	3ª	18th	
1992–93	5	Reg. Pref.	1st	
1993–94	4	3ª	14th	
1994–95	4	3ª	16th	
1995–96	4	3ª	19th	
1996–97	5	Reg. Pref.	1st	
1997–98	4	3ª	7th	
1998–99	4	3ª	18th	
1999–2000	5	1ª Reg.	14th	

- As SD Ponferradina B

Season	Tier	Division	Place
2000–01	5	1ª Reg.	3rd
2001–02	5	1ª Reg.	8th
2002–03	5	1ª Reg.	7th
2003–04	5	1ª Reg.	7th
2004–05	5	1ª Reg.	5th
2005–06	5	1ª Reg.	1st
2006–07	4	3ª	13th
2007–08	4	3ª	16th
2008–09	5	1ª Reg.	6th
2009–10	5	1ª Reg.	1st
2010–11	4	3ª	14th
2011–12	4	3ª	21st
2012–13	5	1ª Reg.	13th
2013–14	DNP		
2014–15	7	2ª Prov.	2nd
2015–16	6	1ª Prov.	2nd
2016–17	6	1ª Prov.	1st
2017–18	5	1ª Reg.	5th
2018–19	5	1ª Reg.	3rd
2019–20	5	1ª Reg.	17th

Season	Tier	Division	Place
2020–21	5	1ª Reg.	1st
2021–22	6	1ª Reg.	1st
2022–23	5	3ª Fed.	8th
2023–24	5	3ª Fed.	18th
2024–25	6	1ª Reg.	6th
2025–26	6	1ª Reg.	9th
2026–27	6	1ª Reg.	

- 14 seasons in Tercera División
- 2 seasons in Tercera Federación

== Current squad ==
As of 1 December 2022

Note: Flags indicate national team as defined under FIFA eligibility rules; some limited exceptions apply. Players may hold more than one non-FIFA nationality.

No.	Pos.	Nation	Player
1	GK	ESP	Àlex Baño
2	DF	ESP	Asier Blanco
3	DF	SEN	Ousseynou Sy
4	DF	UKR	Alan Aussi
5	DF	FRA	Ibrahim Covi
6	DF	GAM	Omar Jaiteh
7	MF	ESP	Javi Mancha
8	MF	ESP	Nico Arce
9	FW	ESP	Mauro Molina
10	FW	ESP	Raúl Arias

No.	Pos.	Nation	Player
11	MF	ESP	Carlos Jiménez
14	MF	ESP	Alberto Martínez
15	DF	ESP	Pol Pla
18	MF	FRA	Yannis Lembezat
19	FW	ESP	Jorge Delicado
20	DF	FRA	Moussa Soumaré
21	DF	ESP	Sergio Castañeda
22	GK	ESP	Alberto Rodríguez
26	MF	ESP	Juan Klein
30	FW	ESP	Hugo Fernández

== Notable former players ==
- (Equatorial Guinea) David Mitogo
- (Spain) Juan Manuel Fuentes

== See also ==
- SD Ponferradina
