= Estadio El Toralín =

Football stadium in Spain

- El Toralín
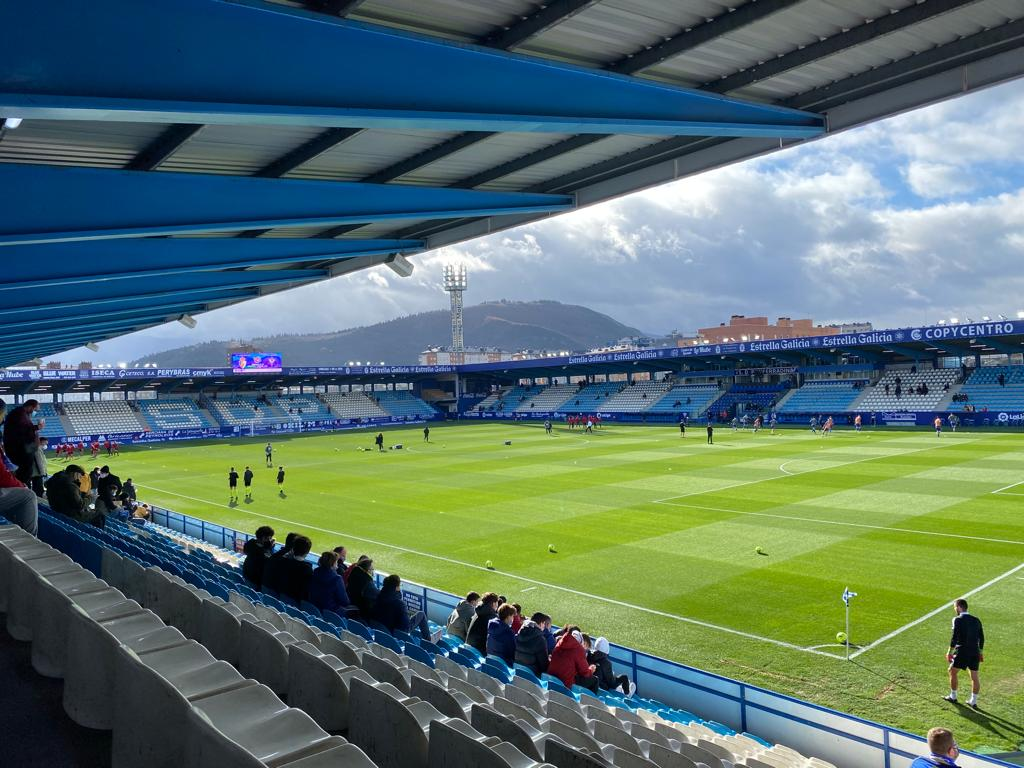
- Interactive map of Estadio El Toralín
- Full name: Estadio Municipal de Fútbol El Toralín
- Location: Ponferrada, Spain
- Coordinates: 42°33′26.64″N 6°35′59.90″W
- Owner: Ayuntamiento de Ponferrada
- Capacity: 8,400
- Surface: Grass
- Field size: 105 m × 70 m (344 ft × 230 ft)

Construction
- Opened: 5 September 2000
- Renovated: 2006, 2011
- Expanded: 2006, 2011

Tenant
- SD Ponferradina

Estadio Municipal de Fútbol El Toralín is a football stadium in Ponferrada, Spain. It is currently used mostly for football matches and is the home ground of SD Ponferradina. The stadium holds 8,400 and was built in 2000.

== History ==
The stadium was officially inaugurated on 5 September 2000, in a friendly match between SD Ponferradina and RC Celta de Vigo which ended up in 0:2.

== International matches ==
The stadium hosted several Spain U-21 official fixtures, with victory for the Spaniards in all matches.

Date	Local	Result	Away	Competition
1 June 2001	Spain	5–1	Bosnia and Herzegovina	2002 UEFA Euro U-21 qualification
16 November 2007	Spain	3–0	Poland	2009 UEFA Euro U-21 qualification
2 March 2010	Spain	3–1	Liechtenstein	2011 UEFA Euro U-21 qualification
