= 2020–21 UD Logroñés season =

UD Logroñés
2020–21 season
- Owner: Félix Revuelta
- President: Félix Revuelta
- Head coach: Sergio Rodríguez
- Stadium: Estadio Las Gaunas
- Segunda División: 20th (relegated)
- Copa del Rey: First round
- Top goalscorer: League: Andy (8); All: Andy (8)
Home colours	Away colours	Third colours

The 2020–21 season was Unión Deportiva Logroñés's 12th season in existence and the club's first season ever in the second division of Spanish football. In addition to the domestic league, UD Logroñés participated in this season's edition of the Copa del Rey. The season covered the period from 21 July 2020 to 30 June 2021.

== Players ==
=== First-team squad ===
As of 16 November 2020

Note: Flags indicate national team as defined under FIFA eligibility rules; some limited exceptions apply. Players may hold more than one non-FIFA nationality.

No.	Pos.	Nation	Player
1	GK	ESP	Rubén Miño
2	DF	ESP	Unai Medina
4	DF	ESP	Gorka Pérez
5	DF	ESP	Pablo Bobadilla
6	MF	ESP	Álvaro Arnedo
7	FW	COL	Leonardo Ruiz (on loan from Sporting CP)
8	MF	ESP	Lander Olaetxea
9	FW	ESP	Ander Vitoria
10	FW	ESP	Zelu
11	FW	ESP	Rubén Martínez
12	MF	POL	Mateusz Bogusz (on loan from Leeds United)
13	GK	ESP	Roberto Santamaría
14	MF	ESP	Jon Errasti
15	DF	ESP	Enrique Clemente (on loan from Zaragoza)

No.	Pos.	Nation	Player
16	DF	ESP	Iñaki Sáenz
17	MF	ESP	Andy Rodríguez
18	MF	ESP	Paulino de la Fuente
19	FW	MAR	Ousama Siddiki
20	DF	ESP	Iago López (on loan from Girona)
21	MF	ARG	Damián Petcoff
22	FW	ESP	David González
23	DF	ESP	Andoni López
24	DF	ESP	Álex Pérez
26	MF	ESP	Jaime Sierra
29	FW	ESP	Martín Lapeña
30	GK	UKR	Yari Meykher
32	DF	ESP	Sergio García
—	FW	NED	Rajiv van La Parra

=== Reserve team ===
Note: Flags indicate national team as defined under FIFA eligibility rules; some limited exceptions apply. Players may hold more than one non-FIFA nationality.

No.	Pos.	Nation	Player
28	DF	ESP	Víctor Martínez
31	DF	ESP	José Amador Viguera

No.	Pos.	Nation	Player
33	GK	ESP	Víctor Pradas

== Transfers ==
=== In ===
No.	Pos	Player	Transferred from	Fee	Date	Source
15			TBD		1 July 2020	

=== Out ===
No.	Pos	Player	Transferred to	Fee	Date	Source
15			TBD		1 July 2020	

== Pre-season and friendlies ==
Win Draw Loss

22 August 2020 Friendly	Real Sociedad	3–1	UD Logroñés	Zubieta, Spain
19:00 CEST (UTC+2)	Willian José 4'; Portu 39' (pen.), 40'		Andy 52' (pen.)	Stadium: Campo José Luis Orbegozo; Attendance: 0 Referee: Rezola Etxeberria

29 August 2020 Friendly	UD Logroñés	3–1	Athletic Bilbao	Logroño, Spain
20:00 CEST (UTC+2)	García Pérez 38' (pen.); Sáenz 70'; Andy 82'		Muniain 54'	Stadium: Estadio Las Gaunas; Attendance: 0 Referee: Miguel Sesma Espinosa

3 September 2020 Friendly	Sporting Gijón	0–0	UD Logroñés	Gijón, Spain
18:30 CEST (UTC+2)				Stadium: Escuela de Fútbol de Mareo; Attendance: 0

== Competitions ==
=== Overview ===
Competition	First match	Last match	Starting round	Final position	Record							
Competition	First match	Last match	Starting round	Final position	Pld	W	D	L	GF	GA	GD	Win %
Segunda División	12 September 2020	23 May 2021	Matchday 1	20th	42	11	11	20	28	53	−25	26.19
Copa del Rey	16 December 2020		First round	First round	1	0	0	1	0	1	−1	0.00
Total					43	11	11	21	28	54	−26	25.58

Last updated: 30 May 2021
Source: Soccerway

=== Segunda División ===
==== League table ====
Pos	Team	Pld	W	D	L	GF	GA	GD	Pts	Promotion, qualification or relegation
18	Lugo	42	11	14	17	38	53	−15	47	
19	Sabadell (R)	42	11	13	18	40	48	−8	46	Relegation to Primera División RFEF
20	UD Logroñés (R)	42	11	11	20	28	53	−25	44	Relegation to Primera División RFEF
21	Castellón (R)	42	11	8	23	35	54	−19	41	Relegation to Primera División RFEF
22	Albacete (R)	42	9	11	22	30	53	−23	38	Relegation to Primera División RFEF

Source: LaLiga
Rules for classification: 1) points; 2) head-to-head points; 3) head-to-head goal difference; 4) goal difference; 5) number of goals scored
(R) Relegated

==== Results summary ====
Overall								Home						Away					
Pld	W	D	L	GF	GA	GD	Pts	W	D	L	GF	GA	GD	W	D	L	GF	GA	GD
42	11	11	20	28	53	−25	44	7	4	10	15	24	−9	4	7	10	13	29	−16

Last updated: 30 May 2021.
Source: La Liga

==== Results by round ====
Round	1	2	3	4	5	6	7	8	9	10	11	12	13	14	15	16	17	18	19	20	21	22	23	24	25	26	27	28	29	30	31	32	33	34	35	36	37	38	39	40	41	42
Ground	A	A	H	A	H	H	A	H	A	H	A	H	A	H	A	H	A	H	A	H	A	H	A	H	A	A	H	A	H	A	H	A	H	A	H	H	A	H	A	H	A	H
Result	L	L	D	L	W	L	D	L	W	W	W	W	W	W	L	L	L	L	D	W	L	D	D	L	L	D	L	D	L	L	D	D	W	W	D	L	D	L	L	W	L	L
Position	19	21	18	19	16	18	18	20	19	15	14	10	7	7	9	11	13	15	14	12	15	14	14	15	16	16	16	16	16	17	17	18	18	16	16	17	17	19	19	18	19	20

Updated to match(es) played on 30 May 2021. Source: La Liga
A = Away; H = Home; W = Win; D = Draw; L = Loss

==== Matches ====
The league fixtures were announced on 31 August 2020.

12 September 2020 1	Sporting Gijón	1–0	UD Logroñés	Gijón
18:15 CEST (UTC+2)	Đurđević 89'; Bogdan (yellow card) 90+1'	Report	Errasti (yellow card) 62'	Stadium: El Molinón; Attendance: 0 (Note: The match was played behind closed doors due to the COVID-19 pandemic in Spain.); Referee: Gorostegui Fernández-Ortega

26 September 2020 3	UD Logroñés	1–1	Castellón	Logroño
18:15 CEST (UTC+2)		Report		Stadium: Las Gaunas; Attendance: 0 Referee: Iosu Galech Apezteguía

3 October 2020 4	Las Palmas	2–1	UD Logroñés	Las Palmas
20:30 CEST (UTC+2)		Report		Stadium: Estadio Gran Canaria; Attendance: 0 Referee: Jon González Esteban

10 October 2020 5	UD Logroñés	1–0	Almería	Logroño
16:00 CEST (UTC+2)	Andy 78'	Report	Balliu (yellow card) 31'; Villalba (yellow card) 45+3'; Costa (yellow card) 62'	Stadium: Estadio Las Gaunas; Attendance: 0 Referee: Oliver De La Fuente Ramos

17 October 2020 6	UD Logroñés	0–1	Leganés	Logroño
20:30 CEST (UTC+2)	Zelu (yellow card) 40'	Report	Bastón 31' (pen.), (yellow card) 37'; Hernández (yellow card) 35'; Merino (yellow card) 90+2'	Stadium: Las Gaunas; Attendance: 0 Referee: Ignacio Iglesias Villanueva

21 October 2020 7	Fuenlabrada	0–0	UD Logroñés	Fuenlabrada
21:30 CEST (UTC+2)		Report		Stadium: Fernando Torres; Attendance: 0 Referee: Javier Iglesias Villanueva

24 October 2020 8	UD Logroñés	2–3	Lugo	Logroño
18:15 CEST (UTC+2)	Andy 34', 90+2' (pen.)	Report	Rodríguez 53', 86'; Ramos 78'	Stadium: Las Gaunas; Attendance: 0 Referee: Rafael Sánchez López

28 October 2020 9	Oviedo	2–3	UD Logroñés	Oviedo
21:30 CET (UTC+1)	Bobadilla 5' (o.g.); Obeng 56'	Report	Acevedo 48', 50'; González 71'	Stadium: Carlos Tartiere; Attendance: 0 Referee: Iosu Galech Apezteguía

2 November 2020 10	UD Logroñés	1–0	Alcorcón	Logroño
16:00 CET (UTC+1)		Report		Stadium: Las Gaunas; Attendance: 0 Referee: Iñaki Vicandi Garrido

7 November 2020 11	Cartagena	0–1	UD Logroñés	Cartagena
16:00 CET (UTC+1)		Report		Stadium: Cartagonova; Attendance: 0 Referee: Aitor Gorostegui Fernández-Ortega

15 November 2020 12	UD Logroñés	1–0	Sabadell	Logroño
18:30 CET (UTC+1)	Acevedo 83'	Report		Stadium: Las Gaunas; Attendance: 0 Referee: Miguel Ángel Ortiz Arias

22 November 2020 13	Tenerife	0–1	UD Logroñés	Santa Cruz de Tenerife
18:15 CET (UTC+1)		Report	González 31'	Stadium: Heliodoro Rodríguez López; Attendance: 0 Referee: Gorka Sagués Oscoz

26 November 2020 14	UD Logroñés	2–0	Albacete	Logroño
19:00 CET (UTC+1)		Report		Stadium: Las Gaunas; Attendance: 0 Referee: Oliver De La Fuente

29 November 2020 15	Mallorca	4–0	UD Logroñés	Palma
18:15 CEST (UTC+2)	Sevilla 8'; Amath (yellow card) 34', (goal) 41'; Prats 69'; Romero 85'	Report	López (red card) 4'	Stadium: Visit Mallorca Stadium; Attendance: 0 Referee: Álvaro Moreno Aragón

2 December 2020 16	UD Logroñés	1–2	Ponferradina	Logroño
19:00 CET (UTC+1)		Report		Stadium: Las Gaunas; Attendance: 0 Referee: Saúl Ais Reig

5 December 2020 17	Rayo Vallecano	2–1	UD Logroñés	Madrid
14:00 CET (UTC+1)		Report		Stadium: Vallecas; Attendance: 0 Referee: Iñaki Vicandi Garrido

10 December 2020 2	Girona	2–0	UD Logroñés	Girona
19:00 CET (UTC+1)		Report		Stadium: Montilivi; Attendance: 0 Referee: Dámaso Arcediano Monescillo

13 December 2020 18	UD Logroñés	0–3	Espanyol	Logroño
14:00 CEST (UTC+2)	López (yellow card) 10'; Clemente (yellow card) 73'	Report	De Tomás 17'; Darder 42'; Puado 50'; Wu Lei (yellow card) 67'	Stadium: Estadio Las Gaunas; Attendance: 0 Referee: Jon González Esteban

20 December 2020 19	Málaga	0–0	UD Logroñés	Málaga
20:30 CET (UTC+1)		Report		Stadium: La Rosaleda; Attendance: 0 Referee: Álvaro Moreno Aragón

2 January 2021 20	UD Logroñés	2–1	Mirandés	Logroño
18:15 CET (UTC+1)		Report		Stadium: Las Gaunas; Attendance: 0 Referee: Iosu Galech Apezteguía

8 January 2021 21	Zaragoza	2–0	UD Logroñés	Zaragoza
21:00 CET (UTC+1)	Narváez 17' (pen.); Bermejo 54'; Chavarría (yellow card) 70'	Report	Sierra (yellow card) 42'; López (yellow card) 44'; Paulino (yellow card) 62'	Stadium: La Romareda; Attendance: 0 Referee: Luis Mario Milla Alvendiz

24 January 2021 22	UD Logroñés	0–0	Oviedo	Logroño
16:00 CET (UTC+1)		Report		Stadium: Las Gaunas; Attendance: 0 Referee: Francisco José Hernández Maeso

1 February 2021 23	Sabadell	0–0	UD Logroñés	Sabadell
21:00 CET (UTC+1)		Report		Stadium: Nova Creu Alta; Attendance: 0 Referee: Miguel Ángel Ortiz Arias

6 February 2021 24	UD Logroñés	0–4	Sporting Gijón	Logroño
18:15 CET (UTC+1)		Report	Đurđević 14', 45', 74'; Čumić 82'	Stadium: Las Gaunas; Attendance: 0 Referee: Rubén Ávalos Barrera

14 February 2021 25	Alcorcón	1–0	UD Logroñés	Alcorcón
18:15 CET (UTC+1)		Report		Stadium: Santo Domingo; Attendance: 0 Referee: Rafael Sánchez López

21 February 2021 26	Lugo	1–1	UD Logroñés	Lugo
20:30 CET (UTC+1)	Barreiro 68'	Report	Andy 57' (pen.)	Stadium: Estadio Anxo Carro; Attendance: 0 Referee: Álvaro Moreno Aragón

27 February 2021 27	UD Logroñés	0–1	Mallorca	Logroño
21:00 CET (UTC+1)	Martínez (yellow card) 56'	Report	Sánchez 19'	Stadium: Estadio Las Gaunas; Attendance: 0 Referee: David Gálvez Rascón

6 March 2021 28	Albacete	1–1	UD Logroñés	Albacete
20:30 CET (UTC+1)		Report		Stadium: Estadio Carlos Belmonte; Attendance: 0 Referee: Iosu Galech Apezteguía

14 March 2021 29	UD Logroñés	0–1	Málaga	Logroño
14:00 CET (UTC+1)		Report	Rahmani 43'	Stadium: Las Gaunas; Attendance: 0 Referee: Saúl Ais Reig

20 March 2021 30	Espanyol	4–0	UD Logroñés	Cornellà de Llobregat
21:00 CET (UTC+1)	Puado 22'; Embarba 25'; Pedrosa 26'; Dimata 70'	Report	Nano (yellow card) 21'; Sierra (yellow card) 36' (yellow-red card) 80'	Stadium: RCDE Stadium; Attendance: 0 Referee: Juan Luis Pulido Santana

27 March 2021 31	UD Logroñés	1–1	Zaragoza	Logroño
21:00 CET (UTC+1)	Andy 15' (pen.), (yellow card) 75'; Petcoff (yellow card) 85'	Report	Jair (yellow card) 14'; Narváez 62'	Stadium: Las Gaunas; Attendance: 0 Referee: Jon Ander González Esteban

30 March 2021 32	Ponferradina	2–2	UD Logroñés	Ponferrada
21:00 CEST (UTC+2)		Report		Stadium: El Toralín; Attendance: 0 Referee: Álvaro Moreno Aragón

3 April 2021 33	UD Logroñés	1–0	Tenerife	Logroño
14:00 CEST (UTC+2)	Sáenz 59'	Report		Stadium: Las Gaunas; Attendance: 0 Referee: Iñaki Vicandi Garrido

11 April 2021 34	Mirandés	0–1	UD Logroñés	Miranda de Ebro
18:15 CEST (UTC+2)		Report		Stadium: Estadio Municipal de Anduva; Attendance: 0 Referee: Gorka Sagués Oscoz

18 April 2021 35	UD Logroñés	0–0	Rayo Vallecano	Logroño
14:00 CEST (UTC+2)	Olaetxea (yellow card) 47'; Paulino (yellow card) 62'; Pérez (yellow card) 71'	Report	Bebé (yellow card) 20'; Comesaña (yellow card) 41'	Stadium: Las Gaunas; Attendance: 0 Referee: Dámaso Arcediano Monescillo

24 April 2021 36	UD Logroñés	0–1	Cartagena	Logroño
16:00 CEST (UTC+2)		Report	Elady 63' (pen.)	Stadium: Las Gaunas; Attendance: 0 Referee: Daniel Jesús Trujillo Suárez

2 May 2021 37	Castellón	0–0	UD Logroñés	Castellón de la Plana
18:15 CEST (UTC+2)		Report		Stadium: Nou Estadi Castàlia; Attendance: 0 Referee: David Gálvez Rascón

9 May 2021 38	UD Logroñés	1–4	Girona	Logroño
18:15 CEST (UTC+2)	Petcoff (yellow card) 13'; Paulino (yellow card) 22'; Bobadilla (yellow card) 56'; López (yellow card) 83'; Vitoria (yellow card) 88'; R. Martínez 90+1'	Report	A. Martínez 14'; Stuani 40', 57' (pen.); Juanpe 85'; Bustos (yellow card) 90'	Stadium: Las Gaunas; Attendance: 0 Referee: Rafael Sánchez López

16 May 2021 39	Leganés	3–0	UD Logroñés	Leganés
21:30 CEST (UTC+2)	Avilés (yellow card) 18'; Silva (yellow card) 20'; Miguel 22', 57'; Merino 81'	Report		Stadium: Estadio Municipal de Butarque; Attendance: 0 Referee: Jon Ander González Esteban

19 May 2021 40	UD Logroñés	1–0	Fuenlabrada	Logroño
19:00 CEST (UTC+2)	Paulino (yellow card) 45+4'; Andy (yellow card) 53', (goal) 75'; González (yellow card) 60'; Iñaki (yellow card) 82'	Report	Fuentes (yellow card) 55'	Stadium: Las Gaunas; Attendance: 0 Referee: Gorka Sagués Oscoz

24 May 2021 41	Almería	2–1	UD Logroñés	Almería
21:00 CEST (UTC+2)	Sadiq 2', (penalty missed) 45'; Chumi 27'	Report	López (yellow card) 44'; Acevedo 68'; Sierra (yellow card) 70'	Stadium: Estadio de los Juegos Mediterráneos; Attendance: 0 Referee: Francisco José Hernández Maeso

30 May 2021 42	UD Logroñés	0–1	Las Palmas	Logroño
21:00 CEST (UTC+2)		Report	Aridai 74'	Stadium: Las Gaunas; Attendance: 0 Referee: Dámaso Arcediano Monescillo

=== Copa del Rey ===
16 December 2020 First round	Amorebieta	1–0	UD Logroñés	Amorebieta
19:00 CET (UTC+1)		Report	Álvaro 45'	Stadium: Urritxe; Referee: David Gálvez Rascón
