= 2019–20 Cádiz CF season =

Cádiz
2019–20 season
- President: Manuel Vizcaíno
- Manager: Álvaro Cervera
- Segunda División: 2nd (promoted)
- Copa del Rey: Second round
- Top goalscorer: League: Álex (12); All: Álex (12)
- Biggest win: Cádiz 3–1 Ponferradina; Cádiz 2–0 Girona; Zaragoza 0–2 Cádiz; Cádiz 2–0 Las Palmas; Cádiz 3–1 Sporting Gijón
- Biggest defeat: Alcorcón 3–0 Cádiz
Home colours	Away colours

The 2019–20 Cádiz CF season was the 110th season in the club's football history. In 2019–20, the club plays in the Segunda División, the second tier of Spanish football, and competed in the Copa del Rey. The season was due to cover a period from 1 July 2019 to 30 June 2020. It was extended extraordinarily beyond 30 June due to the COVID-19 pandemic in Spain.

== Players ==
=== Current squad ===
As of 1 February 2020

Note: Flags indicate national team as defined under FIFA eligibility rules; some limited exceptions apply. Players may hold more than one non-FIFA nationality.

No.	Pos.	Nation	Player
1	GK	ESP	Alberto Cifuentes (captain)
2	DF	DOM	Luismi Quezada
3	DF	ESP	Fali
4	DF	ARG	Marcos Mauro
5	MF	ESP	Jon Ander Garrido (2nd captain)
6	MF	ESP	José Mari
7	MF	ESP	Salvi Sánchez
8	MF	ESP	Álex Fernández
9	FW	HON	Anthony Lozano (on loan from Girona)
10	MF	ESP	Alberto Perea
11	MF	ESP	Jorge Pombo (on loan from Real Zaragoza)
12	MF	FRA	Yann Bodiger

No.	Pos.	Nation	Player
13	GK	ESP	David Gil
14	MF	ESP	Iván Alejo (on loan from Getafe)
15	DF	GEQ	Carlos Akapo
16	DF	ESP	Juan Cala
17	MF	ESP	Edu Ramos
18	MF	ESP	José Manuel Jurado
19	DF	PER	Jean-Pierre Rhyner
20	DF	ESP	Iza Carcelén
21	FW	ESP	Álvaro Giménez (on loan from Birmingham)
22	DF	URU	Pacha Espino
23	FW	ESP	Nano Mesa (on loan from Eibar)
24	FW	SRB	Filip Malbašić (on loan from Tenerife)

=== Reserve team ===
Note: Flags indicate national team as defined under FIFA eligibility rules; some limited exceptions apply. Players may hold more than one non-FIFA nationality.

No.	Pos.	Nation	Player
28	FW	ESP	Seth Airam
31	DF	ESP	José Antonio Franco
32	DF	NGR	Saturday Erimuya

No.	Pos.	Nation	Player
34	DF	ESP	Sergio González
37	MF	ESP	Sergio Pérez
38	MF	ESP	Javi Duarte

=== Out on loan ===
Note: Flags indicate national team as defined under FIFA eligibility rules; some limited exceptions apply. Players may hold more than one non-FIFA nationality.

No.	Pos.	Nation	Player
—	DF	ESP	Brian Oliván (at Girona until 30 June 2020)
—	DF	ESP	José Matos (at Twente until 30 June 2020)
—	DF	ESP	David Carmona (at Racing Santander until 30 June 2020)
—	MF	PAN	Cristian Martínez (at Recreativo until 30 June 2020)
—	DF	ESP	Sergio Sánchez (at Albacete until 30 June 2020)

No.	Pos.	Nation	Player
—	FW	ESP	David Querol (at Albacete until 30 June 2020)
—	MF	ESP	Javi Navarro (at Ponferradina until 30 June 2020)
—	FW	ESP	Caye Quintana (at Fuenlabrada until 30 June 2020)
—	FW	ESP	Dani Romera (at Alcorcón until 30 June 2020)
—	FW	SRB	Đorđe Jovanović (at Cartagena until 30 June 2020)

== Pre-season and friendlies ==
Win Draw Loss

17 July 2019 Friendly	Barbate	1–4	Cádiz	Barbate, Spain
20:00 CEST (UTC+2)	Manuel 72'		Álex 31' (pen.); Quintana 37', 42'; Barco 83'	Stadium: Estadio Municipal de Barbate

20 July 2019 Friendly	Chiclana	1–2	Cádiz	Chiclana de la Frontera, Spain
20:00 CEST (UTC+2)	Agustín 74'		Álex 9'; Quintana 67'	Stadium: Estadio Municipal del Chiclana

23 July 2019 Friendly	Los Barrios	0–1	Cádiz	Los Barrios, Spain
20:30 CEST (UTC+2)			Quintana 28'	Stadium: Estadio San Rafael

27 July 2019 Friendly	Linense	1–1 (4–5 p)	Cádiz	La Línea de la Concepción, Spain
20:30 CEST (UTC+2)	Alcalde 74'		Lekić 6'	Stadium: Estadio Municipal de La Línea de la Concepción

31 July 2019 Friendly	Cádiz	0–0	Las Palmas	La Línea de la Concepción, Spain
20:00 CEST (UTC+2)				Stadium: Estadio Municipal de La Línea de la Concepción

2 August 2019 Friendly	Atlético Sanluqueño	0–1	Cádiz	Sanlúcar de Barrameda, Spain
20:30 CEST (UTC+2)			Kecojević 75'	Stadium: Estadio El Palmar

6 August 2019 Friendly	Cádiz	1–0	Al-Rayyan	Arcos de la Frontera, Spain
20:00 CEST (UTC+2)	Álex 58'			Stadium: Estadio Antonio Barbadillo

10 August 2019 Friendly	Cádiz	1–0	Málaga	Cádiz, Spain
20:00 CEST (UTC+2)	Quintana 6'			Stadium: Estadio Ramón de Carranza; Attendance: 8,150; Referee: Figueroa Vázquez

== Competitions ==
=== Overview ===
Competition	First match	Last match	Starting round	Final position	Record							
Competition	First match	Last match	Starting round	Final position	Pld	W	D	L	GF	GA	GD	Win %
Segunda División	18 August 2019	20 July 2020	Matchday 1	2nd	42	19	12	11	50	39	+11	45.24
Copa del Rey	17 December 2019	11 January 2020	First round	Second round	2	1	1	0	2	1	+1	50.00
Total					44	20	13	11	52	40	+12	45.45

Last updated: 20 July 2020
Source: Soccerway

=== Segunda División ===
==== League table ====
Pos	Team	Pld	W	D	L	GF	GA	GD	Pts	Promotion, qualification or relegation
1	Huesca (C, P)	42	21	7	14	55	42	+13	70	Promotion to La Liga
2	Cádiz (P)	42	19	12	11	50	39	+11	69	Promotion to La Liga
3	Zaragoza	42	18	11	13	59	53	+6	65	Qualification to promotion play-offs
4	Almería	42	17	13	12	62	43	+19	64	Qualification to promotion play-offs
5	Girona	42	17	12	13	48	43	+5	63	Qualification to promotion play-offs

Source: LaLiga Soccerway
Rules for classification: 1) points; 2) head-to-head points; 3) head-to-head goal difference; 4) goal difference; 5) number of goals scored
(C) Champions; (P) Promoted

==== Results summary ====
Overall								Home						Away					
Pld	W	D	L	GF	GA	GD	Pts	W	D	L	GF	GA	GD	W	D	L	GF	GA	GD
42	19	12	11	50	39	+11	69	10	6	5	28	20	+8	9	6	6	22	19	+3

Last updated: 20 July 2020.
Source: La Liga SmartBank

==== Results by round ====
Round	1	2	3	4	5	6	7	8	9	10	11	12	13	14	15	16	17	18	19	20	21	22	23	24	25	26	27	28	29	30	31	32	33	34	35	36	37	38	39	40	41	42
Ground	H	A	H	A	H	A	H	A	H	A	A	H	A	H	A	H	A	H	A	A	H	A	H	A	H	A	H	A	H	H	A	H	A	H	A	H	A	H	A	H	A	H
Result	W	W	W	W	W	L	D	W	W	W	W	W	L	W	D	D	W	L	D	W	L	D	D	L	W	D	W	L	L	W	D	D	W	D	D	L	D	W	W	L	L	L
Position	2	1	1	1	1	2	2	1	1	1	1	1	1	1	1	1	1	1	1	1	1	1	1	2	1	1	1	1	1	1	1	1	1	1	1	1	1	1	1	1	1	2

Updated to match(es) played on 20 July 2020. Source: La Liga SmartBank
A = Away; H = Home; W = Win; D = Draw; L = Loss

==== Matches ====
The fixtures were revealed on 4 July 2019.

18 August 2019 1	Cádiz	3–1	Ponferradina	Cádiz
20:00 CEST (UTC+2)	Navarro 55'; Perea 76'; Nano 86'	Report	Trigueros 46'	Stadium: Estadio Ramón de Carranza; Attendance: 15,009; Referee: Álvaro Moreno Aragón

24 August 2019 2	Mirandés	1–2	Cádiz	Miranda de Ebro
19:00 CEST (UTC+2)	Merquelanz 86'	Report	Perea 61'; Álex 90' (pen.)	Stadium: Estadio Municipal de Anduva; Attendance: 2,943; Referee: Iosu Galech Apezteguía

1 September 2019 3	Cádiz	2–1	Extremadura	Cádiz
21:00 CEST (UTC+2)	Álex 32'; Garrido 90+4'	Report	Zarfino 54'	Stadium: Estadio Ramón de Carranza; Attendance: 15,415; Referee: Aitor Gorostegui Fernández-Ortega

6 September 2019 4	Racing Santander	1–2	Cádiz	Santander
21:00 CEST (UTC+2)	Barral 85'	Report	Perea 34'; Álex 90+11' (pen.)	Stadium: Campos de Sport de El Sardinero; Attendance: 10,389; Referee: Javier Iglesias Villanueva

14 September 2019 5	Cádiz	2–0	Girona	Cádiz
20:30 CEST (UTC+2)	Alcalá 31' (o.g.); Álex 90+5'	Report		Stadium: Estadio Ramón de Carranza; Attendance: 15,597; Referee: Daniel Ocón Arráiz

17 September 2019 6	Alcorcón	3–0	Cádiz	Alcorcón
21:00 CEST (UTC+2)	Stoichkov 45' (pen.), 51'; Ernesto 66' (pen.)	Report		Stadium: Estadio Municipal de Santo Domingo; Attendance: 2,555; Referee: Gorka Sagués Oscoz

21 September 2019 7	Cádiz	0–0	Deportivo La Coruña	Cádiz
16:00 CEST (UTC+2)		Report		Stadium: Estadio Ramón de Carranza; Attendance: 16,133; Referee: Dámaso Arcediano Monescillo

29 September 2019 8	Almería	1–2	Cádiz	Almería
16:00 CEST (UTC+2)	Corpas 79' (pen.)	Report	Lozano 68'; Espino 89'	Stadium: Estadio de los Juegos Mediterráneos; Attendance: 13,107; Referee: Daniel Jesús Trujillo Suárez

2 October 2019 9	Cádiz	1–0	Huesca	Cádiz
19:00 CEST (UTC+2)	Lozano 55'	Report		Stadium: Estadio Ramón de Carranza; Attendance: 15,099; Referee: Javier Iglesias Villanueva

6 October 2019 10	Zaragoza	0–2	Cádiz	Zaragoza
16:00 CEST (UTC+2)		Report	Lozano 57'; Nano 80'	Stadium: La Romareda; Attendance: 26,923; Referee: Óliver de la Fuente Ramos

12 October 2019 11	Málaga	1–2	Cádiz	Málaga
18:00 CEST (UTC+2)	Antoñín 84'	Report	Lozano 32'; Caye Quintana 73'	Stadium: La Rosaleda; Attendance: 17,765; Referee: Rubén Ávalos Barrera

18 October 2019 12	Cádiz	2–0	Las Palmas	Cádiz
21:00 CEST (UTC+2)	Fali 27'; Álex 80' (pen.)	Report		Stadium: Estadio Ramón de Carranza; Attendance: 16,521; Referee: Saúl Ais Reig

25 October 2019 13	Albacete	1–0	Cádiz	Albacete
21:00 CEST (UTC+2)	Zozulya 90+3'	Report		Stadium: Estadio Carlos Belmonte; Attendance: 8,857; Referee: José Antonio López Toca

1 November 2019 14	Cádiz	3–1	Sporting Gijón	Cádiz
16:00 CET (UTC+1)	Mauro 33'; Álex 61', 78' (pen.)	Report	López 63'	Stadium: Estadio Ramón de Carranza; Attendance: 17,157; Referee: Gorka Sagués Oscoz

10 November 2019 15	Rayo Vallecano	1–1	Cádiz	Madrid
21:00 CET (UTC+1)	Trejo 74'	Report	Alejo 38'	Stadium: Campo de Fútbol de Vallecas; Attendance: 9,498; Referee: Javier Iglesias Villanueva

17 November 2019 16	Tenerife	1–1	Cádiz	Santa Cruz de Tenerife
21:00 CET (UTC+1)	Suso 12'	Report	Mauro 35'	Stadium: Estadio Heliodoro Rodríguez López; Attendance: 9,824; Referee: Dámaso Arcediano Monescillo

24 November 2019 17	Cádiz	2–1	Lugo	Cádiz
21:00 CET (UTC+1)	Iza 38', 64'	Report	Iriome 5'	Stadium: Estadio Ramón de Carranza; Attendance: 15,444; Referee: Víctor Areces Franco

1 December 2019 18	Fuenlabrada	1–0	Cádiz	Fuenlabrada
12:00 CET (UTC+1)	Jeisson 80'	Report		Stadium: Estadio Fernando Torres; Attendance: 5,282; Referee: Saúl Ais Reig

8 December 2019 19	Cádiz	0–0	Elche	Cádiz
21:00 CET (UTC+1)		Report		Stadium: Estadio Ramón de Carranza; Attendance: 16,625; Referee: Daniel Jesús Trujillo Suárez

15 December 2019 20	Oviedo	0–2	Cádiz	Oviedo
16:00 CET (UTC+1)		Report	Álex 33'; Querol 66'	Stadium: Estadio Carlos Tartiere; Attendance: 11,808; Referee: Daniel Ocón Arráiz

21 December 2019 21	Cádiz	2–4	Numancia	Cádiz
21:00 CET (UTC+1)	Perea 13'; Querol 77'	Report	Derik 41'; Curro 65' (pen.), 66'; Higinio 89'	Stadium: Estadio Ramón de Carranza; Attendance: 14,730; Referee: Rubén Ávalos Barrera

4 January 2020 22	Ponferradina	0–0	Cádiz	Ponferrada
16:00 CET (UTC+1)		Report		Stadium: El Toralín; Attendance: 5,664; Referee: Juan Luis Pulido Santana

15 January 2020 23	Cádiz	3–3	Mirandés	Cádiz
21:00 CET (UTC+1)	Lozano 40'; Rhyner 47'; Nano 90'	Report	Merquelanz 42'; Guridi 90+5'; Odei 90+7'	Stadium: Estadio Ramón de Carranza; Attendance: 14,984; Referee: Alejandro Muñiz Ruiz

19 January 2020 24	Deportivo La Coruña	1–0	Cádiz	A Coruña
16:00 CET (UTC+1)	Merino 65'	Report		Stadium: Abanca-Riazor; Attendance: 24,229; Referee: Aitor Gorostegui Fernández-Ortega

24 January 2020 25	Cádiz	1–0	Racing Santander	Cádiz
21:00 CET (UTC+1)	Juan Cala 90+2'	Report		Stadium: Estadio Ramón de Carranza; Attendance: 11,237; Referee: Óliver de la Fuente Ramos

2 February 2020 26	Cádiz	1–1	Zaragoza	Cádiz
16:00 CET (UTC+1)	Álex 84' (pen.)	Report	Soro 46'	Stadium: Estadio Ramón de Carranza; Attendance: 17,961; Referee: Miguel Ángel Ortiz Arias

8 February 2020 27	Las Palmas	1–2	Cádiz	Las Palmas
18:15 CET (UTC+1)	Castro 84'	Report	Perea 18'; Álex 73' (pen.)	Stadium: Estadio Gran Canaria; Attendance: 10,846; Referee: Santiago Varón Aceitón

16 February 2020 28	Cádiz	0–1	Málaga	Cádiz
16:00 CET (UTC+1)		Report	Adrián González 51'	Stadium: Estadio Ramón de Carranza; Attendance: 18,433; Referee: Juan Luis Pulido Santana

21 February 2020 29	Sporting Gijón	1–0	Cádiz	Gijón
21:00 CET (UTC+1)	Vázquez 54'	Report		Stadium: El Molinón; Attendance: 17,625; Referee: Daniel Jesús Trujillo Suárez

29 February 2020 30	Cádiz	2–1	Almería	Cádiz
19:15 CET (UTC+1)	Maraš 16' (o.g.); Álex 60'	Report	Corpas 10'	Stadium: Estadio Ramón de Carranza; Attendance: 17,599; Referee: Isidro Díaz de Mera Escuderos

6 March 2020 31	Lugo	1–1	Cádiz	Lugo
21:00 CET (UTC+1)	Carrillo 81'	Report	Lozano 36'	Stadium: Estadio Anxo Carro; Attendance: 3,483; Referee: Rubén Ávalos Barrera

14 June 2020 32	Cádiz	1–1	Rayo Vallecano	Cádiz
21:30 CEST (UTC+2)	Álvaro 85'	Report	Trejo 52'	Stadium: Estadio Ramón de Carranza; Attendance: 0 Referee: Gorka Sagués Oscoz
Note: The match was originally scheduled for 15 March, but was postponed due to the COVID-19 pandemic, and rescheduled to 14 June. It was played behind closed doors.

18 June 2020 33	Numancia	1–2	Cádiz	Soria
19:30 CEST (UTC+2)	Curro 37' (pen.)	Report	José Mari 14'; Cala 90'	Stadium: Nuevo Estadio Los Pajaritos; Attendance: 0 Referee: José Antonio López Toca
Note: The match was originally scheduled for 22 March, but was postponed due to the 2020 coronavirus pandemic, and rescheduled to 18 June. It was played behind closed doors.

21 June 2020 34	Cádiz	1–1	Alcorcón	Cádiz
19:30 CEST (UTC+2)	Lozano 68'	Report	Stoichkov 48'	Stadium: Estadio Ramón de Carranza; Attendance: 0 Referee: Alejandro Muñiz Ruiz
Note: The match was originally scheduled for 29 March, but was postponed due to the 2020 coronavirus pandemic, and rescheduled to 21 June. It was played behind closed doors.

24 June 2020 35	Huesca	1–1	Cádiz	Huesca
19:30 CEST (UTC+2)	Okazaki 65'	Report	Álex 90+7' (pen.)	Stadium: Estadio El Alcoraz; Attendance: 0 Referee: Daniel Jesús Trujillo Suárez
Note: The match was originally scheduled for 5 April, but was postponed due to the 2020 coronavirus pandemic, and rescheduled to 24 June. It was played behind closed doors.

27 June 2020 36	Cádiz	0–2	Tenerife	Cádiz
19:30 CEST (UTC+2)		Report	Gómez 45', 47'	Stadium: Estadio Ramón de Carranza; Attendance: 0 Referee: Álvaro Moreno Aragón
Note: The match was originally scheduled for 12 April, but was postponed due to the 2020 coronavirus pandemic, and rescheduled to 27 June. It was played behind closed doors.

30 June 2020 37	Elche	0–0	Cádiz	Elche
21:45 CEST (UTC+2)		Report		Stadium: Manuel Martínez Valero; Attendance: 0 Referee: Óliver de la Fuente Ramos
Note: The match was originally scheduled for 19 April, but was postponed due to the 2020 coronavirus pandemic, and rescheduled to 30 June. It was played behind closed doors.

4 July 2020 38	Cádiz	2–0	Oviedo	Cádiz
21:45 CEST (UTC+2)	Lozano 44', 51'	Report		Stadium: Estadio Ramón de Carranza; Attendance: 0 Referee: Javier Iglesias Villanueva
Note: The match was originally scheduled for 25 April, but was postponed due to the 2020 coronavirus pandemic, and rescheduled to 4 July. It was played behind closed doors.

7 July 2020 39	Extremadura	0–1	Cádiz	Almendralejo
21:45 CEST (UTC+2)		Report	Lozano 23'	Stadium: Estadio Francisco de la Hera; Attendance: 0 Referee: Miguel Ángel Ortiz Arias
Note: The match was originally scheduled for 3 May, but was postponed due to the 2020 coronavirus pandemic, and rescheduled to 7 July. It was played behind closed doors.

11 July 2020 40	Cádiz	0–1	Fuenlabrada	Cádiz
21:45 CEST (UTC+2)		Report	Fraile 50' (pen.)	Stadium: Estadio Ramón de Carranza; Attendance: 0 Referee: Juan Luis Pulido Santana
Note: The match was originally scheduled for 10 May, but was postponed due to the 2020 coronavirus pandemic, and rescheduled to 11 July. It was played behind closed doors.

17 July 2020 41	Girona	2–1	Cádiz	Girona
21:00 CEST (UTC+2)	Stuani 22', 59' (pen.)	Report	Álex 84' (pen.)	Stadium: Estadi Montilivi; Attendance: 0 Referee: Alejandro Muñiz Ruiz
Note: The match was originally scheduled for 17 May, but was postponed due to the 2020 coronavirus pandemic, and rescheduled to 17 July. It was played behind closed doors.

20 July 2020 42	Cádiz	0–1	Albacete	Cádiz
21:00 CEST (UTC+2)		Report	Maikel 87' (pen.)	Stadium: Estadio Ramón de Carranza; Attendance: 0 Referee: Iñaki Vicandi Garrido
Note: The match was originally scheduled for 24 May, but was postponed due to the 2020 coronavirus pandemic, and rescheduled to 20 July. It was played behind closed doors.

=== Copa del Rey ===
17 December 2019 First round	Lealtad	0–1	Cádiz	Villaviciosa
15:30 CET (UTC+1)		Report	Querol 75'	Stadium: Les Caleyes; Attendance: 900; Referee: Javier Iglesias Villanueva

11 January 2020 Second round	UD Logroñés	1–1 (a.e.t.) (4–2 p)	Cádiz	Logroño
20:30 CET (UTC+1)	Vitoria 89'	Report	Querol 24'	Stadium: Las Gaunas; Attendance: 5,652; Referee: José Antonio López Toca
	Penalties
	Sáenz (penalty scored); Pérez (penalty scored); Siddiki (penalty missed); Vitoria (penalty scored); Errasti (penalty scored)		(penalty scored) Álex; (penalty missed) Carcelén; (penalty missed) Bodiger; (penalty scored) Garrido

== Statistics ==
=== Appearances and goals ===
Last updated on 6 March 2020.

No.	Pos	Nat	Player	Total		Segunda División		Copa del Rey	
No.	Pos	Nat	Player	Apps	Goals	Apps	Goals	Apps	Goals
Goalkeepers
1	GK	(Spain) ESP	Alberto Cifuentes	30	0	30	0	0	0
13	GK	(Spain) ESP	David Gil	4	0	1+1	0	2	0
Defenders
2	DF	(Dominican Republic) DOM	Luismi Quezada	5	0	1+2	0	2	0
3	DF	(Spain) ESP	Fali	24	1	22+1	1	1	0
4	DF	(Argentina) ARG	Marcos Mauro	11	2	10+1	2	0	0
15	DF	(Equatorial Guinea) GEQ	Carlos Akapo	3	0	0+1	0	2	0
16	DF	(Spain) ESP	Cala	20	1	20	1	0	0
19	DF	(Peru) PER	Jean-Pierre Rhyner	7	1	6	1	1	0
20	DF	(Spain) ESP	Iza Carcelén	33	2	31	2	0+2	0
22	DF	(Uruguay) URU	Pacha Espino	29	1	29	1	0	0
31	DF	(Spain) ESP	Franco	1	0	1	0	0	0
32	DF	(Nigeria) NGR	Saturday Erimuya	1	0	0	0	1	0
34	DF	(Spain) ESP	Sergio González	1	0	0	0	0+1	0
Midfielders
5	MF	(Spain) ESP	Jon Ander Garrido	26	1	22+2	1	2	0
6	MF	(Spain) ESP	José Mari	19	0	17+2	0	0	0
7	MF	(Spain) ESP	Salvi	26	0	23+3	0	0	0
8	MF	(Spain) ESP	Álex Fernández	32	11	30+1	11	0+1	0
10	MF	(Spain) ESP	Alberto Perea	25	5	23+2	5	0	0
11	MF	(Spain) ESP	Jorge Pombo	4	0	0+4	0	0	0
12	MF	(France) FRA	Yann Bodiger	14	0	7+5	0	2	0
14	MF	(Spain) ESP	Iván Alejo	25	1	14+9	1	2	0
17	MF	(Spain) ESP	Edu Ramos	13	0	10+3	0	0	0
18	MF	(Spain) ESP	José Manuel Jurado	7	0	0+7	0	0	0
37	MF	(Spain) ESP	Sergio Pérez	1	0	0	0	0+1	0
38	MF	(Spain) ESP	Javi Duarte	1	0	0	0	1	0
Forwards
9	FW	(Honduras) HON	Anthony Lozano	25	6	21+3	6	1	0
21	FW	(Spain) ESP	Álvaro Giménez	4	0	2+2	0	0	0
23	FW	(Spain) ESP	Nano	20	3	8+11	3	0+1	0
24	FW	(Serbia) SRB	Filip Malbašić	4	0	2+2	0	0	0
Players who have made an appearance or had a squad number this season but have left the club
11	FW	(Spain) ESP	Caye Quintana	15	1	5+8	1	1+1	0
24	FW	(Spain) ESP	David Querol	8	4	1+5	2	2	2
26	MF	(Spain) ESP	Javier Navarro	10	1	2+6	1	2	0
