= 2021–22 CD Mirandés season =

CD Mirandés
2021–22 season
- President: Alfredo de Miguel Crespo
- Head coach: Lolo Escobar
- Stadium: Estadio Municipal de Anduva
- Segunda División: 14th
- Copa del Rey: Round of 32
Home colours	Away colours	Third colours

The 2021–22 season was the 95th season in the existence of CD Mirandés and the club's third consecutive season in the second division of Spanish football. In addition to the domestic league, Mirandés participated in this season's edition of the Copa del Rey.

== Players ==
=== First-team squad ===
As of 9 August 2021

Note: Flags indicate national team as defined under FIFA eligibility rules; some limited exceptions apply. Players may hold more than one non-FIFA nationality.

No.	Pos.	Nation	Player
5	DF	ESP	Odei Onaindia
6	MF	ESP	Álex López
10	FW	ESP	Iñigo Vicente (on loan from Athletic Bilbao)
13	GK	ESP	Raúl Lizoain
11	FW	ESP	Simón Moreno
15	DF	ITA	Riccardo Capellini (on loan from Juventus)
19	DF	ESP	Imanol García de Albéniz (on loan from Athletic Bilbao)
20	DF	ESP	Iago López
21	DF	BIH	Bojan Letić

No.	Pos.	Nation	Player
23	MF	ESP	Oriol Rey
28	MF	ESP	Víctor Meseguer
—	GK	ESP	Ramón Juan
—	DF	COL	Anderson Arroyo (on loan from Liverpool)
—	DF	ESP	Sergio Carreira (on loan from Celta)
—	MF	ESP	César Gelabert
—	MF	ESP	Unai Rementería
—	FW	FRA	Haissem Hassan (on loan from Villarreal)

=== Reserve team ===
Note: Flags indicate national team as defined under FIFA eligibility rules; some limited exceptions apply. Players may hold more than one non-FIFA nationality.

No.	Pos.	Nation	Player
26	DF	ESP	Mario Espinar
27	DF	ESP	Mario García
29	FW	ESP	Fredi Sualdea
30	DF	ESP	Carles Marco

No.	Pos.	Nation	Player
32	DF	ESP	Rodrigo Esteban
33	MF	ESP	Juan de la Mata
34	MF	ESP	David Acedo
38	DF	ESP	Marcos Olguín

== Pre-season and friendlies ==
Win Draw Loss Fixtures

28 July 2021 Friendly	Alavés	1–0	Mirandés	Logroño, Spain
18:30 CEST (UTC+2)	Gagua 79'	Report		Stadium: Estadio Las Gaunas

31 July 2021 Friendly	Osasuna	1–0	Mirandés	Navarre, Spain
11:00 CEST (UTC+2)	Barja 66'	Report		Stadium: Campo A2 de Tajonar; Attendance: 330; Referee: Eduardo Prieto Iglesias

7 August 2021 Friendly	Real Sociedad B	1–1	Mirandés	Lasarte-Oria, Spain
19:00 CEST (UTC+2)				Stadium: Zubieta Facilities

== Competitions ==
=== Overall record ===
Competition	First match	Last match	Starting round	Final position	Record							
Competition	First match	Last match	Starting round	Final position	Pld	W	D	L	GF	GA	GD	Win %
Segunda División	16 August 2021	May 2022	Matchday 1		34	12	7	15	46	52	−6	35.29
Copa del Rey	1 December 2021	5 January 2022	First round	Round of 32	3	2	0	1	5	2	+3	66.67
Total					37	14	7	16	51	54	−3	37.84

Last updated: 3 April 2022
Source: Soccerway

=== Segunda División ===
==== League table ====
Pos	Team	Pld	W	D	L	GF	GA	GD	Pts
12	Leganés	42	13	15	14	50	51	−1	54 (Note: Leganés finished ahead of Huesca on head-to-head points: Leganés 2–1 Huesca, Huesca 0–2 Leganés.)
13	Huesca	42	13	15	14	49	44	+5	54
14	Mirandés	42	15	7	20	58	62	−4	52 (Note: Mirandés finished ahead of Ibiza on head-to-head points: Mirandés 4–0 Ibiza, Ibiza 0–2 Mirandés.)
15	Ibiza	42	12	16	14	53	59	−6	52
16	Lugo	42	10	20	12	46	52	−6	50

Source: LaLiga SmartBank
Rules for classification: 1) points; 2) head-to-head points; 3) head-to-head goal difference; 4) goal difference; 5) number of goals scored

==== Results summary ====
Overall								Home						Away					
Pld	W	D	L	GF	GA	GD	Pts	W	D	L	GF	GA	GD	W	D	L	GF	GA	GD
42	15	7	20	58	62	−4	52	12	2	7	43	29	+14	3	5	13	15	33	−18

Source: La Liga SmartBank

==== Results by round ====
Round	1	2	3	4	5	6	7
Ground	A	H	A	H	H	A	H
Result	D	W	L	W	L	W	L
Position	12	5	12	5	7	5	

Source: La Liga SmartBank
A = Away; H = Home; W = Win; D = Draw; L = Loss

==== Matches ====
The league fixtures were announced on 30 June 2021.

16 August 2021 1	Málaga	0–0	Mirandés	Málaga
20:00 CEST (UTC+2)		Report		Stadium: La Rosaleda; Attendance: 6,519; Referee: Juan Luis Pulido Santana

23 August 2021 2	Mirandés	2–0	Amorebieta	Miranda de Ebro
20:00 CEST (UTC+2)	Vicente 53'; Imanol 90'	Report		Stadium: Estadio Municipal de Anduva; Referee: Iván Caparrós Hernández

28 August 2021 3	Sporting Gijón	2–1	Mirandés	Gijón
17:00 CEST (UTC+2)	Babin 34'; Díaz 71'	Report	Moreno 82'	Stadium: El Molinón; Referee: Dámaso Arcediano Monescillo

5 September 2021 4	Mirandés	4–2	Las Palmas	Miranda de Ebro
18:15 CEST (UTC+2)	Camello 9', 20'; Vicente 26'; Riquelme 75'	Report	Pejiño 23', 53'	Stadium: Estadio Municipal de Anduva; Referee: Rafael Sánchez López

11 September 2021 5	Mirandés	1–3	Alcorcón	Miranda de Ebro
21:00 CEST (UTC+2)	Camello 20'	Report	Zarfino 29'; Asencio 62'; Xisco 90+1'	Stadium: Estadio Municipal de Anduva; Referee: Gorka Sagués Oscoz

19 September 2021 6	Tenerife	1–2	Mirandés	Santa Cruz de Tenerife
17:15 WEST (UTC+1)				Stadium: Heliodoro Rodríguez López

26 September 2021 7	Mirandés	1–2	Leganés	Miranda de Ebro
14:00 CEST (UTC+2)				Stadium: Estadio Municipal de Anduva

9 October 2021 9	Mirandés	3–3	Eibar	Miranda de Ebro
16:00 CEST (UTC+2)	Simón Moreno 8'; Iñigo Vicente 72' (pen.); Brugui 90'	Report	Stoichkov 32' (yellow card) 55'; José Corpas 37' (pen.); Edu Expósito 53'	Stadium: Estadio Municipal de Anduva; Attendance: 2,953; Referee: (Spain) Dámaso Arcediano Monescillo

24 October 2021 12	Mirandés	1–4	Almería	Miranda de Ebro
14:00 CET	Oriol Rey (yellow card) 25'; Capellini (yellow card) 29'; Iñigo Vicente 72' (pen.)	Report	Dyego Sousa 5' 23' 53'; Arnau Puigmal 26'; Iván Martos (yellow card) 49'; César de la Hoz (yellow card) 60'; José Carlos Lazo (yellow card) 90+6'	Stadium: Estadio Municipal de Anduva; Attendance: 2,365; Referee: Jon Ander González Esteban

20 February 2022 28	Almería	2–1	Mirandés	Almería
21:00 CET	César de la Hoz (yellow card) 42'; Portillo (yellow card) 45'; Sadiq 69' 72'; Samú Costa (yellow card) 88'	Report	Sergio Camello (yellow card) 40' (goal) 90+9'; Iñigo Vicente (yellow card) 45'; Arroyo (yellow card) 70'	Stadium: Estadio de los Juegos Mediterráneos; Attendance: 8,432; Referee: Aitor Gorostegui Fernández

3 April 2022 34	Eibar	1–1	Mirandés	Eibar
18:15 CET (UTC+1)	Stoichkov 49' (pen.); Antonio Glauder (yellow card) 73'	Report	Sergio Camello (yellow card) 50'; Alejandro Marqués 79'	Stadium: Ipurua; Attendance: 6,023; Referee: (Spain) Iosu Galech Apezteguía

=== Copa del Rey ===
5 January 2022 Round of 32	Mirandés	0–1	Rayo Vallecano	Miranda de Ebro
20:00 CET (UTC+1)	Olguín (yellow card) 82'; Arroyo (yellow card) 88'; López (red card) 90+7'	Report	Martín 67', (yellow card) 75'	Stadium: Anduva; Referee: José Luis Munuera Montero
