= Pablo Bobadilla =

Spanish footballer

Personal information
- Full name: Pablo Bobadilla Sáenz
- Date of birth: 16 November 1996 (age 29)
- Place of birth: Nájera, Spain
- Height: 1.87 m (6 ft 2 in)
- Position: Centre back

Team information
- Current team: UD Logroñés
- Number: 15

Youth career
- EF Nájera
- Comillas
- 2013–2015: Logroñés

Senior career*
| Years | Team | Apps | (Gls) |
| 2015–2018 | Logroñés B | ? | (2) |
| 2017–2021 | Logroñés | 65 | (4) |
| 2018 | → Izarra (loan) | 0 | (0) |
| 2021–2023 | Racing Santander | 23 | (1) |
| 2023–2024 | Ibiza | 3 | (0) |
| 2024– | UD Logroñés | 14 | (1) |
- * Club domestic league appearances and goals as of 25 June 2025

Pablo Bobadilla Sáenz (born 16 November 1996) is a Spanish professional footballer who plays as a central defender for UD Logroñés.

== Club career ==
Born in Nájera, La Rioja, Bobadilla joined UD Logroñés' youth setup in 2013, from Comillas CF. He made his senior debut with the reserves in the 2015–16 season, achieving promotion to the Tercera División.

Bobadilla made his first team debut on 14 May 2017, playing the last seven minutes in a 5–1 Segunda División B home routing of Gernika Club. The following 1 February, he moved to fellow third division side CD Izarra on loan until the end of the season.

Bobadilla failed to appear for Izarra due to injuries, and returned to the Estadio Las Gaunas outfit in July 2016, becoming a regular starter for the main squad afterwards. In August 2019, he suffered a knee injury which kept him out of the entire 2019–20 campaign.

Bobadilla made his professional debut on 12 September 2020, coming on as a late substitute for Zelu in a 0–1 away loss against Sporting de Gijón in the Segunda División.

On 18 June 2021, Bobadilla signed a two-year deal with Primera División RFEF side Racing de Santander.
