= José Antonio Franco =

José Antonio Franco may refer to:

- José Antonio Franco (footballer, born 1979)
- José Antonio Franco (footballer, born 1998)
