= Luismi Quezada =

Dominican Republic footballer (b. 1996)

Personal information
- Full name: Luis Miguel Quezada Sánchez
- Date of birth: 11 February 1996 (age 30)
- Place of birth: Madrid, Spain
- Height: 1.71 m (5 ft 7 in)
- Positions: Left-back; left winger

Team information
- Current team: Cibao

Youth career
- 2004–2005: SS Reyes
- 2005–2006: Santa Ana
- 2006–2015: Real Madrid

Senior career*
Years	Team	Apps	(Gls)
2015–2016	Real Madrid C	1	(0)
2015–2016	→ Olot (loan)	34	(0)
2016–2019	Real Madrid B	71	(10)
2017	Real Madrid	0	(0)
2018–2019	→ Córdoba (loan)	14	(0)
2019–2021	Cádiz	4	(0)
2022	Surkhon Termez	17	(1)
2023–2024	Tokushima Vortis	10	(0)
2024	Cibao	24	(3)

International career
2012	Dominican Republic U17	3	(2)
2012–2014	Dominican Republic U20	4	(3)
2022–	Dominican Republic	2	(0)
- * Club domestic league appearances and goals as of 8 October 2023

Luis Miguel "Luismi" Quezada Sánchez (born 11 February 1996) is a professional footballer who plays as either a left-back or a left winger for Liga DF club Cibao. Born in Spain, he plays for the Dominican Republic national team.

== Club career ==
Born in Madrid to a Dominican father, Quezada joined Real Madrid's youth setup in 2006, after representing UD San Sebastián de los Reyes and DAV Santa Ana. On 18 January 2015, while still a junior, he made his senior debut with the C-team by coming on as a late substitute for Philipp Lienhart in a 0–1 Tercera División away loss against CF Rayo Majadahonda.

On 17 July 2015, after finishing his formation, Quezada was loaned to Segunda División B side UE Olot, for one year. Upon returning from loan, he was assigned to the reserves also in the third level.

Quezada scored his first senior goal on 12 February 2017, netting the equalizer in a 2–1 home defeat of CF Fuenlabrada. He made his first team debut on 28 November, replacing fellow debutant Óscar Rodríguez in a 2–2 home draw against the same team, for the season's Copa del Rey.

On 17 August 2018, Quezada was loaned to Segunda División side Córdoba CF for the campaign. On 2 September of the following year, he signed a permanent two-year deal with fellow league team Cádiz CF.

In February 2022, Quezada joined Uzbekistani club Surkhon Termez, scouted by Spanish coach Ángel Lopez.

On 8 January 2023, Quezada officially signed with J2 club, Tokushima Vortis for upcoming 2023 season.

On 14 February 2024, during a live press conference at Estadio Cibao FC, Quezada officially signed with Cibao FC for the 2024 season.

== Career statistics ==
As of match played 28 September 2023

Appearances and goals by club, season and competition
Club	Season	League			National Cup		Total	
Club	Season	Division	Apps	Goals	Apps	Goals	Apps	Goals
Olot (loan)	2015–16	Segunda División B	34	0	0	0	34	0
Real Madrid Castilla	2016–17	Segunda División B	25	4	—		25	4
Real Madrid Castilla	2017–18	Segunda División B	36	6	—		36	6
Real Madrid Castilla	Total		61	10	0	0	61	10
Real Madrid	2017–18	La Liga	0	0	1	0	1	0
Córdoba (loan)	2018–19	Segunda División	14	0	2	0	16	0
Cádiz	2019–20	Segunda División	4	0	2	0	6	0
Surkhon Termez	2022	Uzbekistan Super League	17	1	3	0	20	1
Tokushima Vortis	2023	J2 League	10	0	0	0	10	0
Cibao FC	2024	Liga Dominicana de Fútbol	24	3	2	0	26	3
Career total			164	14	10	0	174	14

== International career ==
On 9 October 2015, Quezada played the entire second half of a 0–6 non-FIFA friendly loss for the Dominican Republic senior national team against the Brazil Olympic team.
