= Álvaro Arnedo =

Spanish footballer

Personal information
- Full name: Álvaro Arnedo González
- Date of birth: 9 June 1996 (age 30)
- Place of birth: Logroño, Spain
- Height: 1.78 m (5 ft 10 in)
- Position: Midfielder

Team information
- Current team: Arenas
- Number: 24

Youth career
- Comillas
- 2013–2015: Comillas

Senior career*
Years	Team	Apps	(Gls)
2015–2016	UD Logroñés B	23	(4)
2016–2021	UD Logroñés	34	(1)
2016–2017	→ Varea (loan)	28	(1)
2021	Portugalete	14	(1)
2021–2022	SD Logroñés	32	(0)
2022–2023	Linares Deportivo	19	(1)
2023–2024	Rayo Majadahonda	29	(3)
2024–2025	San Fernando	26	(0)
2025–2026	Fuenlabrada	22	(0)
2026–	Arenas	2	(0)
- * Club domestic league appearances and goals as of 26 September 2026

Álvaro Arnedo González (born 9 June 1996) is a Spanish professional footballer who plays as a central midfielder for Primera Federación club Arenas.

== Club career ==
Arnedo was born in Logroño, La Rioja, and joined UD Logroñés' youth setup in 2013, from Comillas CF. He made his senior debut with the former's B-team during the 2015–16 season, in the regional leagues.

Arnedo made his first team debut on 3 January 2016, playing the last 11 minutes of a 2–0 Segunda División B away win against CD Lealtad. In July 2016, he joined Tercera División side CD Varea on loan for the season.

Upon returning, Arnedo was assigned to the main squad and became a regular starter under Sergio Rodríguez. On 29 March 2018, he suffered a knee injury during a 0–0 draw at Arenas Club de Getxo, only returning to action in September 2020 after three surgeries.

Arnedo made his professional debut on 29 November 2020, starting in a 0–4 Segunda División away loss against RCD Mallorca. The following 1 February, after just two further matches, he terminated his contract and signed for Club Portugalete in the third division the following day.
