= Iago López =

Iago López may refer to:

- Iago López (sailor)
- Iago López (footballer)
