= Marcos Olguín =

Spanish footballer

Personal information
- Full name: Marcos Olguín López
- Date of birth: 24 March 2001 (age 25)
- Place of birth: Madrid, Spain
- Height: 6 ft 4 in (1.93 m)
- Position: Centre back

Team information
- Current team: Marbella
- Number: 14

Youth career
- 2013–2020: Villarreal

Senior career*
Years	Team	Apps	(Gls)
2020–2021	Burgos B	13	(0)
2021–2022	Mirandés B	25	(2)
2021–2022	Mirandés	1	(0)
2022–2023	Logroñés B	25	(2)
2022–2023	Logroñés	2	(0)
2023–	Marbella	68	(7)
- * Club domestic league appearances and goals as of 30 November 2025

Marcos Olguín López (born 24 March 2001) is a Spanish footballer who plays as a central defender for Marbella FC.

== Club career ==
Born in Madrid, Olguín joined Villarreal CF's youth setup in 2013, aged 12. He left the club on 18 June 2020, after finishing his formation, and subsequently joined Burgos CF, where he was initially assigned to the reserves in Tercera División.

Olguín made his senior debut on 1 November 2020, starting in a 0–2 away loss against Real Ávila CF. The following 26 January, after being a starter, he moved to another reserve team, CD Mirandés B also in the fourth division.

On 1 July 2021, Olguín renewed his contract with the Rojillos for a further year. He made his first team debut on 13 November, coming on as a late substitute for Oriol Rey in a 0–1 Segunda División home loss against SD Huesca.

After a year, Olguín joined UD Logroñés. This led to him leaving in the summer of 2023, to join Marbella FC.
