= Martín Lapeña =

Spanish footballer

Personal information
- Full name: Martín Lapeña Ramos
- Date of birth: 11 March 2000 (age 26)
- Place of birth: Agullent, Spain
- Height: 1.70 m (5 ft 7 in)
- Position: Attacking midfielder

Team information
- Current team: Ejea
- Number: 8

Youth career
- Valencia

Senior career*
Years	Team	Apps	(Gls)
2019–2021	UD Logroñés B	47	(17)
2020–2021	UD Logroñés	1	(0)
2021–2022	Alzira	14	(0)
2022–2023	Racing Rioja	19	(2)
2022–2023	Racing Rioja B	4	(0)
2023–2024	Talavera	20	(1)
2024–2025	Navalcarnero	27	(1)
2025–	Ejea	24	(0)
- * Club domestic league appearances and goals as of 14 May 2026

Martín Lapeña Ramos (born 11 March 2000) is a Spanish professional footballer who plays for Segunda Federación club Ejea as an attacking midfielder.

== Club career ==
Born in Agullent, Valencian Community, Lapeña was a Valencia CF youth graduate. In 2019, after finishing his formation, he moved to UD Logroñés and was assigned to the reserves in Tercera División.

Lapeña made his senior debut on 24 August 2019, starting in a 1–1 away draw against Comillas CF. He scored his first senior goals on 28 September, netting four times in a 6–1 home routing of CD Pradejón, and finished the campaign with 14 goals in 27 appearances.

Lapeña made his first-team debut on 3 October 2020, coming on as a late substitute for Zelu in a 1–2 away loss against UD Las Palmas in the Segunda División.
