= Nano Mesa =

Spanish footballer

Nano
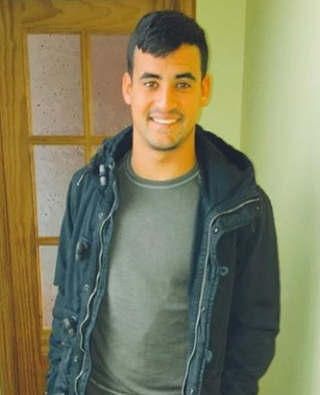
- Nano in 2019

Personal information
- Full name: Alexander Mesa Travieso
- Date of birth: 5 February 1995 (age 31)
- Place of birth: La Laguna, Spain
- Height: 1.78 m (5 ft 10 in)
- Position: Forward

Team information
- Current team: Real Unión de Tenerife

Youth career
- Coromoto
- Padre Anchieta
- Juventud Laguna
- 2006–2014: Tenerife

Senior career*
Years	Team	Apps	(Gls)
2012–2014	Tenerife B	16	(2)
2013–2016	Tenerife	35	(14)
2014–2015	→ L'Hospitalet (loan)	22	(3)
2016–2020	Eibar	6	(1)
2017–2018	→ Levante (loan)	9	(0)
2018	→ Sporting Gijón (loan)	16	(2)
2018–2019	→ Tenerife (loan)	31	(4)
2019–2020	→ Cádiz (loan)	29	(3)
2020–2022	Cádiz	1	(0)
2021	→ Logroñés (loan)	19	(1)
2021–2022	→ Zaragoza (loan)	23	(2)
2025–	Real Unión de Tenerife		
- * Club domestic league appearances and goals as of 29 May 2022

Alexander Mesa Travieso (born 5 February 1995), commonly known as just Nano, is a Spanish footballer who plays as a forward for Real Unión de Tenerife.

He played 16 games and scored once in La Liga for Eibar, Levante and Cádiz, but spent most of his career in the Segunda División, with 163 games and 26 goals in service of five clubs.

== Club career ==
=== Tenerife ===
Nano was born in San Cristóbal de La Laguna, Canary Islands, and joined CD Tenerife's youth setup in 2006 at the age of 11. He made his senior debuts with the reserves in the 2012–13 season, while still a junior, in Tercera División.

On 30 December 2013 Nano was promoted to the main squad in Segunda División. The following 18 January he played his first match as a professional, coming on as a second-half substitute in a 0–4 home loss against AD Alcorcón.

Nano was loaned to CE L'Hospitalet in Segunda División B on 15 August 2014. Just over a year later he was definitely promoted to the Blanquiazules' main squad, signing a new contract until 2018.

Nano scored his first professional goal on 23 August 2015, netting his team's third in a 3–6 away loss against CD Numancia. On 21 February of the following year, he scored a brace in a 3–1 home win against UE Llagostera; he added another seven days later, in a 2–1 success at CD Mirandés.

Nano remained with his goalscoring form later on, scoring a double in a 2–2 draw at Deportivo Alavés in April, and another in a 3–1 home win against Real Valladolid in May. He finished the campaign with 14 goals, being the club's top goalscorer and the eighth overall.

=== Eibar ===
On 27 August 2016, SD Eibar reached an agreement with Tenerife for the transfer of Nano, for a fee of €3.25 million. Two days later, he signed a five-year deal with the La Liga club. He made his debut in the category on 20 September, starting and scoring his team's only in a 1–2 loss at Málaga CF.

Nano was loaned to fellow top-tier club Levante UD on 1 September 2017, for one year. The following 31 January, his loan was terminated and he moved to Sporting de Gijón in the second, on loan until the end of the season.

On 4 August 2018, Nano returned to his first club Tenerife on a one-year loan deal.

=== Cádiz ===
On 13 August 2019, Nano moved to second division side Cádiz CF also in a temporary deal until the end of the 2019–20 season.

After achieving promotion, the Andalusians bought half of Nano's federative rights on 14 August 2020, and he signed a permanent four-year contract with the club. On 31 January 2021, he signed on loan with UD Logroñés for the remainder of the 2020–21 season.

On 28 August 2021, Nano moved to Real Zaragoza also in the second division, on loan for one year. The following 20 July, he terminated his contract with Cádiz.

=== In Kings League ===
In January 2023, Nano played in Gerard Piqué and Ibai Llanos' seven-a-side Kings League for the xBuyer Team. He appeared in a lucha libre mask with the number 69 and sleeves to cover his tattoos, while going under the pseudonym Enigma. While rumoured to be Isco, the player's identity was revealed by journalist Guillem Balagué.

== Career statistics ==
=== Club ===
As of match played 6 March 2021

Appearances and goals by club, season and competition
Club	Season	League			National Cup		Other		Total	
Club	Season	Division	Apps	Goals	Apps	Goals	Apps	Goals	Apps	Goals
Tenerife	2013–14	Segunda División	0	0	0	0	—		0	0
Tenerife	2015–16	Segunda División	35	14	0	0	—		35	14
Tenerife	2016–17	Segunda División	0	0	0	0	—		0	0
Tenerife	Total		35	14	0	0	0	0	35	14
L'Hospitalet (loan)	2014–15	Segunda División B	22	3	3	1	—		25	4
Eibar	2016–17	La Liga	6	1	5	1	—		11	2
Eibar	2017–18	La Liga	0	0	0	0	—		0	0
Eibar	Total		6	1	5	1	0	0	11	2
Levante (loan)	2017–18	La Liga	9	0	2	0	—		11	0
Sporting Gijón (loan)	2017–18	Segunda División	16	2	0	0	1 (Note: Appearance(s) in Promotion Playoffs)	0	17	2
Tenerife (loan)	2018–19	Segunda División	31	4	1	0	—		32	4
Tenerife (loan)	Total Tenerife		66	18	1	0	0	0	67	18
Cádiz (loan)	2019–20	Segunda División	29	3	1	0	—		30	3
Cádiz	2020–21	La Liga	1	0	1	0	—		2	0
Cádiz	Total		30	3	2	0	0	0	32	3
Logroñés (loan)	2020–21	Segunda División	5	1	0	0	—		5	1
Career total			164	28	13	2	1	0	178	30
