= David González (footballer, born 1993) =

Spanish footballer

Personal information
- Full name: David González Gómez
- Date of birth: 2 August 1993 (age 33)
- Place of birth: Oviedo, Spain
- Height: 1.83 m (6 ft 0 in)
- Position: Forward

Team information
- Current team: Recreativo
- Number: 23

Youth career
- Oviedo
- 2011: Covadonga

Senior career*
Years	Team	Apps	(Gls)
2010–2011	Oviedo B	4	(0)
2011–2014	Covadonga	73	(30)
2014–2018	Oviedo B	70	(36)
2016	→ Lealtad (loan)	13	(2)
2016–2017	→ Caudal (loan)	31	(5)
2018–2019	Langreo	27	(10)
2019–2021	Logroñés	61	(9)
2021–2023	Algeciras	70	(19)
2023–2024	Persis Solo	33	(7)
2024–2025	Zamora	26	(4)
2025–	Recreativo	24	(4)
- * Club domestic league appearances and goals as of 7 May 2026

David González Gómez (born 2 August 1993), commonly known as Roni, is a Spanish professional footballer who plays as a forward for Segunda Federación club Recreativo.

== Club career ==
González was born in Oviedo, Asturias, and represented Real Oviedo as a youth. He made his senior debut with the reserves on 19 December 2010, playing the last 14 minutes in a 1–1 Tercera División away draw against Real Avilés.

In July 2011, González moved to Covadonga; initially assigned back to the youth setup, he ended the season with 11 goals in only 18 first team appearances. On 29 May 2014, after scoring 13 goals, he returned to Oviedo and its B-team.

González scored a career-best 22 goals for Vetusta in 2014–15, and subsequent served loans at Segunda División B sides Lealtad and Caudal Deportivo. Back to the Carbayones in July 2017, he was assigned back to the B-side in the fourth tier.

On 30 August 2018, González agreed to a contract with third division side Langreo, after terminating his link with Oviedo. On 3 July of the following year, he moved to fellow league team Logroñés, and contributed with six goals in 27 appearances as the club achieved a first-ever promotion to Segunda División B.

González made his professional debut on 12 September 2020 at the age of 27, coming on as a second-half substitute for Jon Errasti in a 0–1 away loss against Sporting de Gijón.

== Personal life ==
González was nicknamed Roni by his former Vetusta manager Iván Ania, who saw a player with physical strengths similar as of Ronaldo.
