= Mateusz Bogusz =

Polish footballer (born 2001)

- Bogusz in 2026

Personal information
- Full name: Mateusz Piotr Bogusz
- Date of birth: 22 August 2001 (age 25)
- Place of birth: Ruda Śląska, Poland
- Height: 1.75 m (5 ft 9 in)
- Position: Attacking midfielder

Team information
- Current team: Houston Dynamo
- Number: 19

Youth career
- Gwiazda Ruda Śląska
- 2011–2018: Ruch Chorzów

Senior career*
Years	Team	Apps	(Gls)
2018–2019	Ruch Chorzów	32	(5)
2019–2023	Leeds United	1	(0)
2020–2021	→ Logroñés (loan)	23	(1)
2021–2023	→ Ibiza (loan)	42	(6)
2023–2024	Los Angeles FC	60	(18)
2025–2026	Cruz Azul	27	(2)
2026–	Houston Dynamo	32	(8)

International career^{‡}
2017	Poland U16	1	(0)
2017–2018	Poland U17	15	(1)
2018	Poland U19	7	(2)
2019	Poland U20	3	(0)
2019–2021	Poland U21	18	(4)
2024–	Poland	5	(0)
- * Club domestic league appearances and goals as of 1:19, 2 November 2026 (UTC) ‡ National team caps and goals as of 23:47, 15 June 2025 (UTC)

Mateusz Piotr Bogusz (born 22 August 2001) is a Polish professional footballer who plays as an attacking midfielder for Major League Soccer side Houston Dynamo.

Bogusz started his career at Ekstraklasa side Ruch Chorzów, before signing for Leeds United in January 2019. He made his league debut for the club in July 2020, before spending the 2020–21 and 2021–22 seasons on loan in the Segunda División.

== Club career ==
=== Ruch Chorzów ===
Born in Ruda Śląska, Bogusz started his youth career at Polish side Ruch Chorzów before making his first-team debut at 16 years old during the 2017–18 season in I liga on 4 March 2018 in a 2–0 win against Bytovia Bytów.

In 2018, his impressive form for the side meant that Bogusz was offered a trial at Italian Serie A side S.S.C. Napoli, however he was not granted permission by Ruch Chorzów. He made 13 appearances for the side during the 2017–18 season but was unable to prevent Ruch Chorzów being relegated from I liga.

Despite being just 16, he was given the number 10 shirt for the 2018–19 season. He scored his first goal for Ruch Chorzów on 27 October 2018 against Błękitni Stargard. He scored his sixth goal of the II liga season on 19 January 2019 in a 4–1 win against Ruch Radzionków in what appeared to be his final game for the club, as on 22 January 2019, Ruch Chorzów announced that a fee had been agreed with English Championship side Leeds United to sign the player.

=== Leeds United ===
Bogusz joined English EFL Championship side Leeds United on 29 January 2019 for an undisclosed fee, signing a two-and-a-half-year contract. He became Leeds' second signing of the 2019 January transfer window after the signing of Kiko Casilla. He was part of Carlos Corberán's Leeds United under-23 side that won the PDL Northern League 2018–19 season, before becoming the national Professional Development League champions following victory over Birmingham City in the final. He was named in the first-team squad for the first time on 28 April 2019 as an unused substitute in a 1–1 draw against Aston Villa and featured on the bench three more times that season.

Bogusz featured in the club's first-team during the pre-season ahead of the 2019–20 season, featuring in Marcelo Bielsa's 16-man squad for Leeds' pre-season tour of Australia for matches against Manchester United and West Sydney Wanderers, and scoring against the latter. He made his senior debut for Leeds on 27 August 2019 in an EFL Cup match against Stoke City, with Leeds losing on 4–5 on penalties after a 2–2 draw in normal time. After the English professional football season was paused in March 2020 due to the COVID-19 pandemic, the season was resumed during June, where Leeds earned promotion to the Premier League as Championship champions for the 2019–20 season, with Bogusz making his league debut for the club in the final game of the season in a 4–0 victory against Charlton Athletic.

His first start of the 2020–21 season came on 16 September 2020 for Premier League Leeds in a 1–1 draw against EFL League One side Hull City in the EFL Cup, with Hull winning 9–8 on penalties. Bogusz was then named as an unused substitute in the following Premier League game against Fulham on 19 September after an injury to Pablo Hernández. Bogusz signed a new three-year contract with Leeds on 11 August 2020. On 5 October 2020, deadline day, Bogusz joined Spanish Segunda División side Logroñés on loan for the 2020–21. He scored once in 24 appearances as the club finished 20th in the league and were relegated.

On 7 July 2021, Bogusz joined newly promoted Segunda División side Ibiza on a season-long deal. On 31 August 2022, the loan was extended for another season. The loan was terminated on 24 March 2023.

=== Los Angeles FC ===
On 31 March 2023, Bogusz signed a four-year contract with Major League Soccer club Los Angeles FC.

=== Cruz Azul ===
On 25 January 2025, Bogusz joined Mexican club Cruz Azul for a reported fee of US$9 million.

=== Houston Dynamo ===
On 29 January 2026, Houston Dynamo signed Bogusz on a permanent transfer for an undisclosed fee.

== International career ==
Bogusz has represented Poland at international level at several age groups. On 13 May 2019, Bogusz was called up to the Poland U20 squad for the FIFA U-20 World Cup.

On 19 August 2019, Bogusz was called up to the Poland U21 team for the first time for matches against Latvia U21 and Estonia U21 in September 2019. He debuted against the latter opponent in a 4–0 victory. On 5 September 2020, Bogusz scored his first goals for Poland with a brace in a 6–0 victory against Estonia U21.

Bogusz received his first call-up to the Polish senior squad for two Nations League matches against Scotland and Croatia in September 2024. He debuted on 8 September against the latter opponent, playing 62 minutes as Croatia won 1–0.

== Style of play ==
Bogusz plays mainly as an attacking midfielder in the number 10 role. In Poland he was known for his technical ability and eye for goal. He can also play as a central midfielder or as a deep-lying midfielder.

At LAFC, Bogusz regularly started as a false 9 during the 2024 season. He scored 18 goals, his highest goal total in his career, including his first professional hat-trick against the Colorado Rapids on 29 June 2024.

== Career statistics ==
=== Club ===
As of match played 10 December 2025

Appearances and goals by club, season and competition
Club	Season	League			National cup (Note: Includes Polish Cup, Copa del Rey, U.S. Open Cup)		League cup (Note: Includes EFL Cup)		Continental		Other		Total	
Club	Season	Division	Apps	Goals	Apps	Goals	Apps	Goals	Apps	Goals	Apps	Goals	Apps	Goals
Ruch Chorzów	2017–18	I liga	13	0	0	0	—		—		—		13	0
Ruch Chorzów	2018–19	II liga	19	5	1	0	—		—		—		20	5
Ruch Chorzów	Total		32	5	1	0	—		—		—		33	5
Leeds United	2018–19	Championship	0	0	0	0	0	0	—		0	0	0	0
Leeds United	2019–20	Championship	1	0	0	0	1	0	—		—		2	0
Leeds United	2020–21	Premier League	0	0	0	0	1	0	—		—		1	0
Leeds United	Total		1	0	0	0	2	0	—		0	0	3	0
Logroñés (loan)	2020–21	Segunda División	23	1	1	0	—		—		—		24	1
Ibiza (loan)	2021–22	Segunda División	20	4	2	0	—		—		—		22	4
Ibiza (loan)	2022–23	Segunda División	22	2	2	0	—		—		—		24	2
Ibiza (loan)	Total		42	6	4	0	—		—		—		46	6
Los Angeles FC	2023	Major League Soccer	28	3	1	0	—		4 (Note: Appearances in CONCACAF Champions League/Champions Cup)	0	9 (Note: Five appearances in MLS Cup Playoffs, three appearances and one goal in Leagues Cup, one appearance in Campeones Cup)	1	42	4
Los Angeles FC	2024	Major League Soccer	32	15	5	1	—		—		11 (Note: Seven appearances and three goals in Leagues Cup, four appearances and one goal in MLS Cup Playoffs)	4	48	20
Los Angeles FC	Total		60	18	6	1	—		4	0	20	5	90	24
Cruz Azul	2024–25	Liga MX	14	1	—		—		8	1	—		22	2
Cruz Azul	2025–26	Liga MX	13	1	—		—		0	0	4 (Note: Three appearances in Leagues Cup, one appearance in FIFA Intercontinental Cup)	0	17	1
Cruz Azul	Total		27	2	0	0	0	0	8	1	4	0	39	3
Career total			185	32	12	1	2	0	12	1	24	5	235	39

=== International ===
As of match played 6 June 2025

Appearances and goals by national team and year
National team	Year	Apps	Goals
Poland	2024	2	0
Poland	2025	3	0
Total		5	0

== Honours ==
Leeds United

- EFL Championship: 2019–20

Los Angeles FC

- U.S. Open Cup: 2024
- CONCACAF Champions League runner-up: 2023
- Leagues Cup runner-up: 2024
- Campeones Cup runner-up: 2023

Cruz Azul

- CONCACAF Champions Cup: 2025
- FIFA Derby of the Americas runner-up: 2025

Individual

- MLS Player of the Month: June 2024
