= Víctor Pradas =

Spanish footballer

Personal information
- Full name: Víctor Pradas Gutiérrez
- Date of birth: 20 April 1999 (age 27)
- Place of birth: Logroño, Spain
- Height: 1.88 m (6 ft 2 in)
- Position: Goalkeeper

Team information
- Current team: Arnedo

Youth career
- Villegas
- 2017–2018: Varea

Senior career*
Years	Team	Apps	(Gls)
2017	Villegas	2	(0)
2018–2019	Varea	12	(0)
2019–2022	Logroñés B	52	(0)
2020–2023	Logroñés	1	(0)
2023	Estepona	0	(0)
2023–2024	Náxara	15	(0)
2024–	Arnedo	3	(0)
- * Club domestic league appearances and goals as of 6 October 2024

Víctor Pradas Gutiérrez (born 20 April 1999) is a Spanish professional footballer who plays as a goalkeeper for Arnedo.

== Club career ==
Pradas was born in Logroño, La Rioja, and made his senior debut with CD Villegas on 9 April 2017, starting in a 1–3 Tercera División away loss against CD Anguiano. In August of that year, he moved to fellow fourth division side CD Varea, being initially assigned back at the youth setup.

In July 2019, after being a second-choice in the previous campaign, Pradas moved to UD Logroñés and was assigned to the B-team also in division four. He made his first-team debut on 5 December 2020, coming on as a second-half substitute for injured Rubén Miño in a 1–2 away loss against Rayo Vallecano in the Segunda División.
