= Edu Ramos =

Spanish footballer

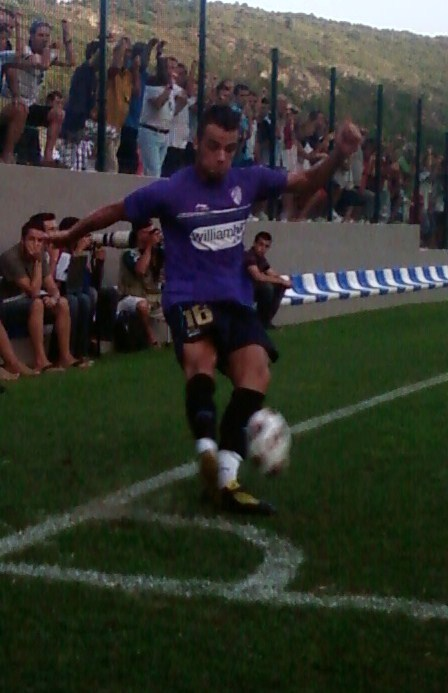
- Ramos taking a corner for Málaga in 2010

Personal information
- Full name: Eduardo Ramos Gómez
- Date of birth: 17 February 1992 (age 34)
- Place of birth: Málaga, Spain
- Height: 1.76 m (5 ft 9 1/2 in)
- Position: Midfielder

Team information
- Current team: Alhaurín Torre

Youth career
- 2006–2007: Málaga

Senior career*
Years	Team	Apps	(Gls)
2007–2009	Málaga B	37	(2)
2009–2011	Málaga	8	(0)
2011	→ Leganés (loan)	9	(0)
2011–2012	Villarreal C	27	(1)
2012–2014	Villarreal B	75	(5)
2013–2014	Villarreal	3	(0)
2014–2016	Albacete	59	(1)
2016–2018	Córdoba	69	(1)
2018–2020	Cádiz	41	(1)
2020–2021	Marbella	21	(1)
2022–	Alhaurín Torre	78	(3)

International career
2008–2009	Spain U17	5	(0)
2010	Spain U19	2	(0)
- * Club domestic league appearances and goals as of 15:52, 19 February 2026 (UTC)

Eduardo 'Edu' Ramos Gómez (Spanish pronunciation: [eˈðwaɾðo ˈramos]; born 17 February 1992) is a Spanish footballer who plays as a central midfielder for Alhaurín de la Torre.

He achieved Segunda División totals of 182 games and four goals over seven seasons, in service of four clubs. In La Liga, he represented Málaga and Villarreal (11 appearances).

== Club career ==
=== Málaga ===
Born in Málaga, Andalusia, Ramos came through his hometown club Málaga CF's youth system. He made his first-team (and La Liga) debut at only 17 on 4 October 2009, as a second-half substitute in the 1–1 draw away against Xerez CD. He spent his first professional season, however, almost exclusively with the reserves, only appearing two more times in the league.

Ramos was deemed surplus to requirements alongside five other players in December 2010, shortly after the arrival of manager Manuel Pellegrini. On 5 January 2011, he was sent on loan to CD Leganés of Segunda División B until the end of the campaign.

=== Villarreal ===
On 11 July 2011, Ramos signed for Villarreal CF, with Málaga having a buyback option on the player. Having started out with the third team, he was eventually promoted to the second in the Segunda División, making his debut – as a starter – on 3 February 2012 in a 0−0 home draw against FC Barcelona Atlètic.

Ramos scored his first goal for Villarreal B on 3 March 2012, in a 4−3 home win over CD Alcoyano. He made his official debut for the main squad on 14 December of the following year, starting the 2−1 loss at FC Barcelona.

=== Later career ===
On 9 July 2014, Ramos moved to Albacete Balompié, newly promoted to the second division. In July 2016, after their relegation, he joined Córdoba CF.

On 30 August 2018, Ramos moved to fellow second tier side Cádiz CF on a one-year contract, with Córdoba retaining a buyout clause; in May 2019, he agreed to a new two-year deal at the former. He contributed 17 games in 2019–20 to help his team to return to the top flight, then left by mutual consent in October 2020.

== International career ==
Ramos represented the Spain under-17 team in the 2009 FIFA World Cup, a third-place finish in Nigeria. On 17 August 2010, he was selected by the under-19s for the SBS International Cup in Japan.

== Honours ==
Spain U17

- FIFA U-17 World Cup third place: 2009
