= Javi Duarte =

Spanish footballer

Personal information
- Full name: Javier Duarte Egea
- Date of birth: 22 December 1997 (age 28)
- Place of birth: Málaga, Spain
- Height: 1.75 m (5 ft 9 in)
- Position: Midfielder

Team information
- Current team: Estepona
- Number: 15

Youth career
- 2013–2014: Málaga
- 2014–2015: 26 de Febrero
- 2015–2016: Cádiz

Senior career*
Years	Team	Apps	(Gls)
2016–2021	Cádiz B	141	(4)
2019–2021	Cádiz	1	(0)
2021–2022	Algeciras	28	(0)
2022–2024	Linares	70	(4)
2024–2025	Marbella	24	(0)
2025–	Estepona	25	(2)
- * Club domestic league appearances and goals as of 7 May 2026

Javier "Javi" Duarte Egea (born 22 December 1997) is a Spanish professional footballer who plays as a central midfielder for Segunda Federación club Estepona.

== Club career ==
Born in Málaga, Andalusia, Duarte joined Cádiz CF's youth setup in 2015, after representing CD 26 de Febrero and Málaga CF. Promoted to the reserves ahead of the 2016–17 campaign, he made his senior debut on 4 September 2016 by starting in a 2–0 División de Honor home win against Xerez CD.

Duarte was a regular starter for the B's as the side achieved promotion to the Tercera División, and scored his first goal on 1 November 2017, in a 3–1 home defeat of CD Ciudad de Lucena. On 7 August 2019, after helping the B-team achieve another promotion, he renewed his contract with the club until 2022.

Duarte made his first team debut on 17 December 2019, playing the full 90 minutes in a 1–0 win at CD Lealtad, in the season's Copa del Rey. He made his professional debut the following 17 July, coming on as a second-half substitute for Augusto Fernández in a 0–1 loss at Girona FC in the Segunda División.

On 19 June 2024, Duarte signed a one-season contract with Marbella, with an option to extend.
