= David Querol =

Spanish footballer

Personal information
- Full name: David Querol Blanco
- Date of birth: 25 February 1989 (age 37)
- Place of birth: Reus, Spain
- Height: 1.86 m (6 ft 1 in)
- Position: Forward

Youth career
- 1997–2007: Unió Astorga
- 2007–2008: Reus

Senior career*
Years	Team	Apps	(Gls)
2008–2011	Reus	77	(28)
2011–2013	Betis B	31	(6)
2013–2014	Gimnàstic	34	(5)
2014–2016	Llagostera	65	(12)
2016–2019	Reus	48	(6)
2019–2020	Cádiz	18	(3)
2020	→ Albacete (loan)	2	(0)
Total		275	(60)
- * Club domestic league appearances and goals

David Querol Blanco (born 25 February 1989) is a Spanish former professional footballer who played as a forward.

== Club career ==
Born in Reus, Tarragona, Catalonia, Querol finished his development at CF Reus Deportiu; he made his senior debut in the 2008–09 season, in the Tercera División. In 2010–11 he scored a career-best 13 goals, helping his team return to Segunda División B.

On 27 April 2011, Querol signed a two-year contract with Real Betis, with the move being made effective in June. He was assigned to the reserves who competed in the third division, but missed his debut campaign due to injury.

On 7 July 2013, Querol joined Gimnàstic de Tarragona of the same league. He featured regularly during his spell – albeit mostly as a substitute – as the side finished fourth in the regular season and fell short in the promotion play-offs.

On 14 July 2014, Querol signed a two-year deal with UE Llagostera, newly promoted to Segunda División. He made his league debut on 23 August, aged 25, starting in a 2–0 away loss against UD Las Palmas.

Querol scored his first professional goal on 18 January 2015, closing the 2–0 home win over Real Valladolid. On 4 June of the following year, with his team already relegated, he netted four times in a 6–2 home rout of Real Zaragoza, taking his tally up to nine.

On 9 July 2016, Querol returned to Reus, now in the second tier. In January 2019, he terminated his contract due to the club's poor financial situation overall.

Querol agreed to a two-and-a-half-year deal at Cádiz CF on 30 January 2019, as a free agent. Exactly one year later, he was loaned to fellow second division side Albacete Balompié for the remainder of the season.

On 5 October 2020, Querol terminated his contract with Cádiz.
