= Damián Petcoff =

Argentine footballer

Damián
Personal information
- Full name: Damián Ezequiel Petcoff Kailer
- Date of birth: 24 May 1990 (age 36)
- Place of birth: Buenos Aires, Argentina
- Height: 1.76 m (5 ft 9 in)
- Position: Midfielder

Team information
- Current team: Minera
- Number: 5

Youth career
- 2000–2004: Boca Juniors
- 2004–2008: Betis

Senior career*
Years	Team	Apps	(Gls)
2008–2012	Betis B	85	(2)
2012–2014	Córdoba	1	(0)
2013–2014	→ Jaén (loan)	13	(0)
2014–2015	Córdoba B	41	(4)
2015–2016	Eldense	34	(1)
2016–2017	Marbella	19	(2)
2017–2018	Valencia B	11	(1)
2018–2019	Badajoz	32	(1)
2019–2020	Gimnàstic	15	(0)
2020–2021	UD Logroñés	28	(0)
2021–2023	Atlético Baleares	58	(0)
2023–2024	Badajoz	29	(0)
2024–	Minera	55	(2)
- * Club domestic league appearances and goals as of 7 May 2026

Damián Ezequiel Petcoff Kailer (born 24 May 1990) is an Argentine footballer who plays for Spanish club Minera as a midfielder.

== Football career ==
Petcoff started his career with hometown side Boca Juniors, joining the club's youth categories in 2000 at the age of ten. Four years later he moved abroad, joining Real Betis and finishing his formation with the club. He appeared with the B-team for four seasons, and in 2012 summer signed a contract with Segunda División side Córdoba CF.

Petcoff made his professional debut on 12 September 2012, coming on as a second-half substitute for Pepe Díaz in a 1–0 Copa del Rey home win against Elche CF. He made his league debut on 11 November, replacing Fede Vico in a 5–3 away defeat of SD Ponferradina.

In January 2013, after being rarely used, Petcoff was loaned to Real Jaén in the third level. In July, after achieving promotion, the loan was renewed to a further season, but he only appeared in 102 minutes of action (only 58 in the league) during the whole campaign, which ended in relegation.

Upon returning to the Blanquiverdes, Petcoff was assigned to the reserves in division three, and terminated his contract on 10 August 2015. He continued to appear in the category in the following years, representing CD Eldense, Marbella FC, Valencia CF Mestalla, CD Badajoz, Gimnàstic de Tarragona and UD Logroñés.
