= Yaroslav Meykher =

Ukrainian footballer

Yari Meykher
Personal information
- Full name: Yaroslav Mikhailovich Meykher
- Date of birth: 21 March 2000 (age 26)
- Place of birth: Tovste, Ukraine
- Height: 1.84 m (6 ft 0 in)
- Position: Goalkeeper

Team information
- Current team: Badalona Futur
- Number: 1

Youth career
- Pinatar
- 2015–2018: Espanyol

Senior career*
| Years | Team | Apps | (Gls) |
| 2018–2019 | Espanyol B | 1 | (0) |
| 2019 | → Hospitalet (loan) | 1 | (0) |
| 2019–2021 | Logroñés B | 25 | (0) |
| 2020–2021 | Logroñés | 4 | (0) |
| 2021–2023 | Valladolid B | 14 | (0) |
| 2023–2024 | Cornellà | 17 | (0) |
| 2024– | Badalona Futur | 7 | (0) |

International career
| 2018 | Ukraine U18 | 1 | (0) |
- * Club domestic league appearances and goals as of 13 October 2024

Yaroslav "Yari" Mikhailovich Meykher (born 21 March 2000) is a Ukrainian footballer who plays for Spanish club Badalona Futur as a goalkeeper.

== Club career ==
Born in Tovste, Meykher joined RCD Espanyol's youth setup in 2015, from EFB Pinatar. He made his senior debut with the former's reserves on 8 April 2018, starting in a 1–2 Tercera División away loss against CE L'Hospitalet.

On 7 December 2018, after being only a third choice, Meykher was loaned to CE L'Hospitalet until the end of the season. The following July, he moved to UD Logroñés and was initially assigned to the B-team.

Meykher made his professional debut on 17 October 2020, starting in a 0–1 home loss against CD Leganés in the Segunda División.
