= Iñaki Sáenz =

Spanish footballer

Iñaki Sáez
Personal information
- Full name: Iñaki Sáenz Arenzana
- Date of birth: 29 April 1988 (age 38)
- Place of birth: Logroño, Spain
- Height: 1.77 m (5 ft 9 1/2 in)
- Position: Midfielder

Team information
- Current team: Logroñés
- Number: 16

Youth career
- Calahorra
- 2006–2007: Zaragoza

Senior career*
Years	Team	Apps	(Gls)
2007–2009	Calahorra	67	(11)
2009–2013	Logroñés	126	(2)
2014–2015	Racing Santander	84	(4)
2015–2016	Alavés	3	(0)
2016–2018	Tenerife	34	(0)
2019–	Logroñés	191	(20)
- * Club domestic league appearances and goals as of 7 May 2026

Iñaki Sáenz Arenzana (born 29 April 1988) is a Spanish footballer who plays for UD Logroñés. Mainly a central midfielder, he can also play as a left back.

== Football career ==
Born in Logroño, La Rioja, Iñaki graduated from Real Zaragoza's youth setup, and made his senior debuts with locals CD Calahorra in the 2007–08 campaign, in Tercera División.

In the 2009 summer Iñaki joined UD Logroñés in Segunda División B. He featured regularly with the side, featuring in more than 120 matches during his four-year spell. On 22 July 2013 Iñaki signed a one-year deal with Racing de Santander, also in the third level. He featured in 37 matches during the season, as the Cantabrians returned to Segunda División at first attempt.

On 19 August 2014 Iñaki signed a new two-year deal with the Verdiblancos. Five days later he played his first match as a professional, starting in a 0–1 away loss against Girona FC.

Iñaki scored his first goal in the second level on 27 September 2014, netting the second in a 3–0 home win against Recreativo de Huelva. On 6 December of the following year, after suffering relegation, he moved to Deportivo Alavés after agreeing to an 18-month deal.

On 2 July 2016, Iñaki signed for CD Tenerife also in the second level. He left the club in 2018 after being sparingly used, and returned to Logroñés on 13 January 2019.

== Honours ==
Alavés

- Segunda División: 2015–16
