= José Antonio Franco (footballer, born 1998) =

Spanish footballer

Personal information
- Full name: José Antonio Franco Márquez
- Date of birth: 9 March 1998 (age 28)
- Place of birth: Seville, Spain
- Position: Left back

Team information
- Current team: Internacional Madrid
- Number: 21

Youth career
- Nervión
- 2015–2017: Betis

Senior career*
Years	Team	Apps	(Gls)
2014	Nervión	1	(0)
2017–2018	Cabecense	35	(0)
2018–2020	Cádiz B	24	(0)
2019–2020	Cádiz	1	(0)
2020–	Internacional Madrid	0	(0)
- * Club domestic league appearances and goals as of 8 March 2020

José Antonio Franco Márquez (born 9 March 1998) is a Spanish professional footballer who plays as a left back for Internacional de Madrid.

== Club career ==
Franco was born in Seville, Andalusia, and started playing as a youth with AD Nervión. He made his senior debut with the club on 21 December 2014, playing the last three minutes of a 4–0 Segunda Andaluza home routing of UD Rinconada.

In August 2015, Franco joined Real Betis and returned to youth football. On 16 June 2017, after finishing his formation, he signed for CD Cabecense in the Tercera División.

On 12 July 2018, Franco agreed to a three-year contract with Cádiz CF, being initially assigned to the reserves also in the fourth division. He made his first team debut on 21 September of the following year, starting in a 0–0 home draw against Deportivo de La Coruña in the Segunda División.

On 29 August 2020, Franco was transferred to Segunda División B side Internacional de Madrid.
