= Oriol Rey =

Spanish footballer

Personal information
- Full name: Oriol Rey Erenas
- Date of birth: 25 February 1998 (age 28)
- Place of birth: Barcelona, Spain
- Height: 1.77 m (5 ft 10 in)
- Positions: Defensive midfielder; centre-back

Team information
- Current team: Levante
- Number: 20

Youth career
- 2008–2017: Barcelona
- 2017–2018: Leeds United

Senior career*
Years	Team	Apps	(Gls)
2018–2019	Leeds United	0	(0)
2018–2019	→ Conquense (loan)	34	(1)
2019–2021	Valladolid B	44	(1)
2021	Valladolid	1	(0)
2021–2023	Mirandés	72	(0)
2023–	Levante	95	(1)
- * Club domestic league appearances and goals as of 27 May 2026

Oriol Rey Erenas (born 25 February 1998) is a Spanish professional footballer who plays as a defensive midfielder or centre-back for Levante UD.

== Career ==
Born in Barcelona, Catalonia, Rey joined FC Barcelona's La Masia in 2008, aged ten. On 27 July 2017, he agreed to a two-year contract with EFL Championship side Leeds United.

Rey signed his first professional contract with The Whites on 13 May 2018, and joined Segunda División B side UB Conquense on a season-long loan deal in August. He made his senior debut on 9 September, playing the last 32 minutes of a 1–1 away draw against CF Peralada.

Rey scored his first senior goal on 13 April 2019, netting the last of a 3–0 home win against Valencia CF Mestalla. He ended the season as a regular starter, contributing with one goal in 34 appearances, but his side suffered relegation.

On 18 July 2019, Rey signed a three-year contract with Real Valladolid, being assigned to the reserves also in the third division. He made his first team debut on 16 January 2021, coming on as a substitute for Toni Villa in the extra time of a 4–1 away win against SCR Peña Deportiva, for the season's Copa del Rey.

Rey made his professional debut with the Pucelanos on 26 January 2021, replacing Kike Pérez late into 2–4 home loss to Levante UD also for the national cup. His La Liga debut occurred three days later, as he replaced Míchel in a 1–3 loss against SD Huesca also at the Estadio José Zorrilla.

On 28 July 2021, Rey signed a two-year contract with Segunda División side CD Mirandés. On 29 June 2023, he moved to fellow league team Levante also on a two-year deal.

== Career statistics ==
As of 23 May 2024

Appearances and goals by club, season and competition
Club	Season	League			Cup		Other		Total	
Club	Season	Division	Apps	Goals	Apps	Goals	Apps	Goals	Apps	Goals
Leeds United	2017-18	Championship	0	0	0	0	—		0	0
Leeds United	2018-19	Championship	0	0	—		—		0	0
Leeds United	Total		0	0	0	0	0	0	0	0
Conquense (loan)	2018-19	Segunda División B	34	1	—		3 (Note: Appearance(s) in Copa Federación)	0	37	1
Real Valladolid B	2019–20	Segunda División B	22	1	—		1 (Note: Appearance in 2020 Segunda División B play-offs)	0	23	1
Real Valladolid B	2020-21	Segunda División B	22	0	—		—		22	0
Real Valladolid B	Total		44	1	0	0	1	0	45	1
Real Valladolid	2020-21	La Liga	1	0	2	0	—		3	0
Mirandés	2021-22	Segunda División	31	0	2	0	—		33	0
Mirandés	2022-23	Segunda División	41	0	0	0	—		41	0
Mirandés	Total		72	0	2	0	0	0	74	0
Levante	2023-24	Segunda División	34	1	1	0	—		35	1
Career total			185	3	5	0	4	0	194	3

== Honours ==
Levante

- Segunda División: 2024–25
