= UD Logroñés B =

Association football club in Spain

- Full name: Unión Deportiva Logroñés, S.A.D. "B"
- Nicknames: Logroñés B, Promesas
- Founded: 2009
- Ground: Ciudad Deportiva UD Logroñés, Logroño, La Rioja, Spain
- Capacity: 2000
- President: Félix Revuelta
- Head coach: Yayo Urzay
- League: Tercera Federación – Group 16
- 2024–25: Tercera Federación – Group 16, 2nd of 18
Home colours	Away colours

Unión Deportiva Logroñés "B", also known as Logroñés Promesas, is the reserve team of UD Logroñés. It is based in Logroño, in the autonomous community of La Rioja. Founded in 2009 it currently plays in Tercera Federación – Group 16, holding home matches at Estadio Las Gaunas, with a capacity of 16,000 seats.

== History ==
In the 2018-19 season the club finished 4th in the Tercera División, Group 16.

== Season to season ==
Season	Tier	Division	Place
2009–10	5	Reg. Pref.	3rd
2010–11	4	3ª	5th
2011–12	4	3ª	6th
2012–13	DNP		
2013–14	DNP		
2014–15	DNP		
2015–16	5	Reg. Pref.	2nd
2016–17	4	3ª	8th
2017–18	4	3ª	8th
2018–19	4	3ª	4th
2019–20	4	3ª	5th
2020–21	4	3ª	2nd / 4th
2021–22	4	2ª RFEF	12th
2022–23	4	2ª Fed.	16th
2023–24	5	3ª Fed.	1st
2024–25	5	3ª Fed.	2nd
2025–26	5	3ª Fed.	1st
2026–27	4	2ª Fed.	

- 3 seasons in Segunda Federación/Segunda División RFEF
- 7 seasons in Tercera División
- 3 seasons in Tercera Federación

== Current squad ==
As of 22 October 2020

Note: Flags indicate national team as defined under FIFA eligibility rules; some limited exceptions apply. Players may hold more than one non-FIFA nationality.

No.	Pos.	Nation	Player
—	GK	UKR	Yari Meykher
—	GK	ESP	Víctor Pradas
—	DF	ESP	David Hernández
—	DF	ESP	Izan Flaño
—	DF	ESP	Víctor Martínez
—	DF	ESP	José Amador Viguera
—	DF	ESP	Íñigo Ochoa
—	DF	ESP	Gerard Marquillas
—	DF	ESP	Iván Fernández
—	DF	ESP	Sergio García
—	MF	ESP	Adrián Ruiz
—	MF	ESP	Ander Dulce

No.	Pos.	Nation	Player
—	MF	ESP	Juan José Gómez
—	MF	ESP	Jaime Garijo
—	MF	ARG	Giuliano Bertino
—	FW	ESP	Martín Lapeña
—	FW	MAR	Abdu Thiabo
—	FW	ESP	Camilo Dueñas
—	FW	ESP	Ion Ander Mora
—	FW	ESP	Alex Martínez
—	FW	ESP	Aitor Añibarro
—	FW	ESP	Pablo Fernández
—	FW	ESP	Antonio Jesús García
