= Gorka Pérez =

Spanish footballer

Personal information
- Full name: Gorka Pérez Garay
- Date of birth: 19 June 1995 (age 31)
- Place of birth: Gordexola, Spain
- Height: 1.86 m (6 ft 1 in)
- Positions: Centre back; midfielder

Team information
- Current team: Arenteiro
- Number: 5

Youth career
- Barakaldo

Senior career*
Years	Team	Apps	(Gls)
2014–2015	Basconia	31	(1)
2015–2019	Bilbao Athletic	37	(0)
2015–2016	→ Gernika (loan)	27	(0)
2019–2021	Logroñés	43	(0)
2021–2022	Badajoz	29	(3)
2022–2023	Numancia	37	(0)
2023–2024	Lugo	26	(0)
2024–2025	Gimnàstic	20	(1)
2025–	Arenteiro	19	(0)
- * Club domestic league appearances and goals as of 10 June 2026

Gorka Pérez Garay (born 19 June 1995) is a Spanish professional footballer who plays as either a central defender or a defensive midfielder for Primera Federación club Arenteiro.

== Club career ==
Born in Gordexola, Biscay, Basque Country, Pérez finished his formation with Barakaldo CF. In 2014 he joined Athletic Bilbao, being assigned to the farm team in Tercera División and making his senior debut during the season; a defensive midfielder, he was also converted to a central defender during his spell at the side.

On 20 August 2015, shortly after being promoted to the reserves, Pérez was loaned to Segunda División B side Gernika Club, for one year. Upon returning, he was assigned back at the B-team, now also in the third division.

On 27 May 2019, Athletic announced Pérez's departure from the club. He signed for UD Logroñés still in the third division on 1 July, and helped the club achieve a first-ever promotion to Segunda División at the end of the season.

Pérez made his professional debut on 12 September 2020, starting in a 0–1 away loss against Sporting de Gijón. The following 26 July, he joined to Primera División RFEF club CD Badajoz.

Pérez was a regular starter for the Blanquinegros during the campaign, scoring a brace in a 3–3 home draw against Cultural y Deportiva Leonesa on 2 October 2021. He continued to play in the third division in the following years, representing CD Numancia, CD Lugo and Gimnàstic de Tarragona.
