= Zelu =

Spanish footballer (born 1996)

Personal information
- Full name: José Luis García Pérez
- Date of birth: 21 January 1996 (age 30)
- Place of birth: Jerez de la Frontera, Spain
- Height: 1.70 m (5 ft 7 in)
- Position: Winger

Team information
- Current team: Xerez
- Number: 7

Youth career
- Sevilla

Senior career*
Years	Team	Apps	(Gls)
2015–2016	Marbella	17	(2)
2016–2017	Málaga B	21	(4)
2017	→ San Fernando (loan)	14	(2)
2017–2018	Melilla	34	(1)
2018–2020	Córdoba	18	(2)
2018–2019	→ Cultural Leonesa (loan)	30	(3)
2020	→ Logroñés (loan)	6	(0)
2020–2021	Logroñés	15	(0)
2021–2023	Badajoz	69	(7)
2023–2024	Othellos Athienou	14	(0)
2024	Atlético Sanluqueño	19	(4)
2024–2025	Recreativo Huelva	23	(1)
2025–	Xerez	29	(2)
- * Club domestic league appearances and goals as of 7 May 2026

José Luis García Pérez (born 21 January 1996), commonly known as Zelu, is a Spanish professional footballer who plays as a winger for Segunda Federación club Xerez.

== Club career ==
Born in Jerez de la Frontera, Cádiz, Andalusia, Zelu finished his formation with Sevilla FC. On 21 July 2015, he moved to Segunda División B side Marbella FC, and made his senior debut on 29 August of that year by playing the last 15 minutes of a 2–2 away draw against UD Melilla.

Zelu scored his first senior goal on 11 October 2015, netting the opener of a 2–3 loss at UD Almería B. The following 28 January, he moved to Málaga CF and was assigned to the reserves in Tercera División.

Zelu returned to the third tier on 30 December 2016, after agreeing to a deal with San Fernando CD. He moved to fellow league team Melilla on 1 August of the following year, and was a regular starter for the club during the campaign, as his side narrowly missed out the play-offs due to goal average.

In July 2018, Zelu signed for Segunda División side Córdoba CF, but was loaned to Cultural y Deportiva Leonesa on 21 August. Back to the Blanquiverdes for 2019–20, he was assigned to the main squad in the third division before moving out on loan to fellow league team UD Logroñés on 30 January 2020.

Zelu contributed with seven appearances (play-offs included) as Logroñés achieved a first-ever promotion to Segunda División. In July 2020, he signed permanently for UDL, after terminating his contract with Córdoba.

Zelu made his professional debut on 12 September 2020, starting in a 0–1 away loss against Sporting de Gijón.

On 17 August 2021, he joined to Primera División RFEF club Badajoz.
