= Comillas CF =

Association football club in Spain

Comillas
- Full name: Comillas Club de Fútbol
- Founded: 2006
- Ground: Estadio Mundial 82, Logroño, La Rioja, Spain
- Capacity: 1,275
- Chairman: María Teresa Lázaro Ochoa
- Manager: Javier Adan Arrea
- League: Tercera Federación – Group 16
- 2025–26: Tercera Federación – Group 16, 14th of 18
- Website: https://www.cfcomillas.com
Home colours

Comillas Club de Fútbol is a Spanish football team located in Logroño, the capital of the autonomous community of Rioja. Founded in 2006 it currently plays in Tercera Federación – Group 16, holding home matches at Estadio Mundial 82, with a capacity of 1,275 spectators.

== History ==
The club was founded in 2006 as a result of the split of AD Loyola. The 2019-20 season is the first in Tercera División for Comillas CF.

== Season to season ==
| Season | Tier | Division | Place | Copa del Rey |
|---|---|---|---|---|
| 2007–08 | 5 | Reg. Pref. | 1st | |
| 2008–2018 | DNP | | | |
| 2018–19 | 5 | Reg. Pref. | 2nd | |
| 2019–20 | 4 | 3ª | 16th | First round |
| 2020–21 | 4 | 3ª | 10th / 7th | |
| 2021–22 | 6 | Reg. Pref. | 3rd | |
| 2022–23 | 5 | 3ª Fed. | 14th | |
| 2023–24 | 5 | 3ª Fed. | 17th | |
| 2024–25 | 5 | 3ª Fed. | 12th | |
| 2025–26 | 5 | 3ª Fed. | 14th | |
| 2026–27 | 5 | 3ª Fed. | | |

- 2 seasons in Tercera División
- 5 seasons in Tercera Federación
