= CF Fuenlabrada =

Spanish professional football club

Coordinates: 40.2911°N 3.8267°W

Fuenlabrada
- Full name: Club de Fútbol Fuenlabrada, S.A.D.
- Nicknames: Fuenla; Kirikos; Azulones
- Founded: 5 June 1975; 51 years ago
- Stadium: Estadio Fernando Torres
- Capacity: 5,400
- President: Jonathan Praena
- Head coach: Rober Ortiz
- League: Tercera Federación – Group 7
- 2025–26: Segunda Federación – Group 5, 15th of 18 (relegated)
- Website: www.cffuenlabrada.es
Home colours	Away colours

Club de Fútbol Fuenlabrada, S.A.D. is a Spanish football club based in Fuenlabrada, Community of Madrid, Spain, that currently competes in Tercera Federación – Group 7. Founded in 1975, it holds home matches at Estadio Fernando Torres.

== History ==
Fuenlabrada was founded in 1975, as a merge between San Esteban and Atlético Fuenlabrada. The idea came from the mayor of the city, Regino Benítez, who suggested the directors of both clubs can unite their efforts and by this receive a higher municipal grant. A key role in the birth of the new club was played by Ramón García Pajuelo, who was appointed secretary of the entity and is still linked to the club as its delegate. In 1986, the team was first promoted to Tercera Division, finishing third from bottom in their debut campaign.

With Julián Pérez as a president, Fuenlabrada achieved new level, culminating with the promotion to Segunda División B in 1994. They bounced between that and Segunda Division B for the next 30 years. For the 1997–98 season, the club made infusions of certain amounts of money to hire a new coach Eduardo Caturla and new players in order to achieve promotion, but finished the season only in 9th position in the Segunda División B. With the will to achieve promotion, for the following season the club bet on another coach of recognized prestige and with the experience in La Liga, Felix Barderas.

The team had its best result in the Copa del Rey in 2017–18, reaching the last 32 through a bye and wins over Mérida AD and CD Calahorra. In a two-game tie with European champions Real Madrid, the side lost 4–2 on aggregate, having drawn the second leg 2–2 away at the Santiago Bernabéu Stadium.

Fuenlabrada played at La Aldehuela before moving into the Estadio Fernando Torres in August 2011, named after former Spanish international forward Fernando Torres, who was born in the town but never represented the club. In 2016–17, the club finished in 3rd position in Segunda División B, before losing each match of the playoffs 0–1 to CF Villanovense. Mere was appointed as coach for the 2018-19 season.

On 2 June 2019, Fuenlabrada was promoted for the first time ever to Segunda División by defeating Recreativo de Huelva 4–1 on aggregate in the play-offs. Ten days later, the club took the Segunda B title with a 2–1 aggregate win over Racing de Santander.

On 7 May 2022, Fuenlabrada was relegated to Primera RFEF, bringing their three-season spell in the second tier to an end.

== Season to season ==
Season	Tier	Division	Place	Copa del Rey
1975–76	8	3ª Reg.	3rd	
1976–77	7	3ª Reg. P.	2nd	
1977–78	7	2ª Reg.	12th	
1978–79	7	2ª Reg.	11th	
1979–80	7	2ª Reg.	4th	
1980–81	6	1ª Reg.	10th	
1981–82	6	1ª Reg.	1st	
1982–83	5	Reg. Pref.	8th	
1983–84	5	Reg. Pref.	4th	
1984–85	5	Reg. Pref.	4th	
1985–86	5	Reg. Pref.	2nd	
1986–87	4	3ª	18th	
1987–88	4	3ª	6th	
1988–89	4	3ª	5th	
1989–90	4	3ª	2nd	
1990–91	4	3ª	2nd	Second round
1991–92	4	3ª	10th	Second round
1992–93	4	3ª	1st	
1993–94	4	3ª	2nd	
1994–95	3	2ª B	16th	Second round

Season	Tier	Division	Place	Copa del Rey
1995–96	3	2ª B	11th	
1996–97	3	2ª B	6th	
1997–98	3	2ª B	9th	
1998–99	3	2ª B	8th	
1999–2000	3	2ª B	13th	
2000–01	3	2ª B	16th	
2001–02	4	3ª	5th	
2002–03	4	3ª	3rd	
2003–04	3	2ª B	9th	
2004–05	3	2ª B	16th	
2005–06	3	2ª B	6th	
2006–07	3	2ª B	10th	Second round
2007–08	3	2ª B	18th	
2008–09	4	3ª	10th	
2009–10	4	3ª	5th	
2010–11	4	3ª	8th	
2011–12	4	3ª	1st	
2012–13	3	2ª B	6th	First round
2013–14	3	2ª B	6th	Second round
2014–15	3	2ª B	12th	Second round

Season	Tier	Division	Place	Copa del Rey
2015–16	3	2ª B	11th	
2016–17	3	2ª B	3rd	
2017–18	3	2ª B	3rd	Round of 32
2018–19	3	2ª B	1st	Second round
2019–20	2	2ª	8th	Second round
2020–21	2	2ª	11th	Round of 32
2021–22	2	2ª	21st	Round of 32
2022–23	3	1ª Fed.	11th	First round
2023–24	3	1ª Fed.	14th	
2024–25	3	1ª Fed.	16th	
2025–26	4	2ª Fed.	15th	
2026–27	5	3ª Fed.		

- 3 seasons in Segunda División
- 3 seasons in Primera Federación
- 19 seasons in Segunda División B
- 1 season in Segunda Federación
- 14 seasons in Tercera División
- 1 season in Tercera Federación

== Players ==
=== Current squad ===
As of 4 March 2026.

Note: Flags indicate national team as defined under FIFA eligibility rules; some limited exceptions apply. Players may hold more than one non-FIFA nationality.

No.	Pos.	Nation	Player
1	GK	ESP	Álvaro Cortés
2	DF	ESP	Sergio Montes
3	DF	ESP	Pol Bassa
4	DF	ARG	Marcos Mauro
5	DF	ESP	Rubén del Valle
6	DF	ESP	Carlos Cano
7	FW	ESP	Raúl Pesca
8	MF	ESP	Edu Llorente
9	FW	ESP	Ismael Fernández
10	MF	ESP	Jorge Sarmiento
11	FW	ESP	Marcos Carrillo
13	GK	ESP	Alex Garzón

No.	Pos.	Nation	Player
14	MF	ESP	Borja Díaz
15	DF	ESP	Pablo Ramírez
16	MF	ESP	Álvaro Arnedo
17	DF	ESP	Gexan Elosegi
18	MF	GBS	Isaac Mendes
19	FW	ESP	David Santisteban
20	FW	ESP	David Nates
21	DF	ESP	Alfredo Pedraza
22	FW	ESP	Ángel Rodríguez
23	DF	ESP	Alex Rodríguez
27	DF	ESP	Jaime Robert
28	MF	ESP	Sergio Romero

=== Reserve team ===
Note: Flags indicate national team as defined under FIFA eligibility rules; some limited exceptions apply. Players may hold more than one non-FIFA nationality.

No.	Pos.	Nation	Player

== Staff ==
=== Technical staff ===
Position	Staff
Head coach	(Spain) Alfredo Sánchez
Assistant coach	(Spain) Rubén Anuarbe
Fitness coach	(Spain) Chamo
Goalkeeping coach	(Spain) Dele
Physioterapist	(Spain) Antonio (Spain) Javi
Analyst	(Spain) Miguel Ángel Sierra
Sport readaptator	(Spain) Joselu
Chief doctor	(Spain) Juan Manuel Blanco
Nutritionist	(Spain) Kevin Ardón
Kit man	(Ghana) Baba Sule (Spain) Jota

Last updated: 2 March 2023
Source: CF Fuenlabrada (in Spanish)

== Reserve team ==
Fuenlabrada's reserve team was founded in 2015, and it currently plays in the Preferente de Madrid – Group 2.
