= Iago López (footballer) =

Spanish footballer

Personal information
- Full name: Iago López Carracedo
- Date of birth: 6 April 1999 (age 27)
- Place of birth: Lugo, Spain
- Height: 1.77 m (5 ft 10 in)
- Position: Right back

Team information
- Current team: Lugo
- Number: 20

Youth career
- Lugo
- 2015–2018: Deportivo La Coruña

Senior career*
Years	Team	Apps	(Gls)
2017	Deportivo B	1	(0)
2018–2019	Peralada	29	(2)
2019–2021	Girona	0	(0)
2019–2021	→ Logroñés (loan)	55	(1)
2021–2022	Mirandés	22	(0)
2022–2024	Alcorcón	60	(0)
2024–2025	Universitatea Craiova	3	(0)
2025–	Lugo	22	(0)
- * Club domestic league appearances and goals as of 9 June 2026

Iago López Carracedo (born 6 April 1999) is a Spanish professional footballer who plays as a right back for Primera Federación club Lugo.

== Club career ==
López was born in Lugo, Galicia, and represented CD Lugo and Deportivo de La Coruña as a youth. He made his senior debut with the latter's reserves on 7 May 2017, starting in a 2–1 Tercera División away win against CD As Pontes.

On 11 July 2018, after finishing his formation, López moved to Girona FC and was assigned to the farm team in Segunda División B. On 19 August of the following year, he was loaned to UD Logroñés still in the third division, as Girona's affiliation with Peralada ended.

López became a regular starter during the campaign, contributing with one goal in 19 appearances as his side achieved promotion to Segunda División. On 28 August 2020, his loan at UDL was extended for a further year.

López made his professional debut on 12 September 2020, starting in a 0–1 away loss against Sporting de Gijón. On 13 July of the following year, after Logroñés' relegation, he signed a permanent two-year deal with CD Mirandés also in the second tier.

On 29 July 2022, López moved to AD Alcorcón, freshly relegated to Primera Federación.

== Honours ==
Logroñés

- Segunda División B: 2019–20
