= Jon Errasti =

Spanish footballer (born 1988)

Personal information
- Full name: Jon Errasti Zabaleta
- Date of birth: 6 June 1988 (age 38)
- Place of birth: Eibar, Spain
- Height: 1.80 m (5 ft 11 in)
- Position: Defensive midfielder

Youth career
- Eibar
- Real Sociedad

Senior career*
Years	Team	Apps	(Gls)
2008–2012	Real Sociedad B	104	(2)
2012–2015	Eibar	91	(0)
2015–2017	Spezia	45	(2)
2017–2019	Alcorcón	30	(0)
2019	Elana Toruń	7	(0)
2019–2021	Logroñés	36	(0)
Total		313	(4)
- * Club domestic league appearances and goals

Jon Errasti Zabaleta (born 6 June 1988) is a Spanish former professional footballer who played as a defensive midfielder.

== Club career ==
Born in Eibar, Gipuzkoa, Errasti played youth football with Basque Country neighbours Real Sociedad. He made his senior debut in the 2007–08 season with the reserves, in the Segunda División B.

In late June 2012, Errasti signed with local SD Eibar also in the third tier. He was an undisputed first choice in his first season, totalling nearly 4,000 minutes in all competitions as his team finally achieved promotion in the playoffs.

On 28 September 2013, Errasti made his Segunda División debut when he started in a 3–2 away loss against Sporting de Gijón. He contributed 32 appearances in 2013–14, as the Armeros were promoted to La Liga for the first time ever.

Errasti made his debut in the Spanish top flight on 24 August 2014, in the 1–0 home win over his former club. Roughly a year later, he moved abroad for the first time in his career, joining Italian Serie B side Spezia Calcio.

On 11 July 2017, Errasti returned to Spain and its second division after agreeing to a two-year deal at AD Alcorcón. On 29 January 2019, having been rarely used during the campaign, he terminated his contract.

Errasti signed with Polish II liga team Elana Toruń on 15 March 2019. He returned to his home country in July, joining third-tier UD Logroñés.

== Honours ==
Eibar

- Segunda División: 2013–14
