= Estadio Las Gaunas =

Football stadium in Logroño, Spain

Estadio Municipal Las Gaunas
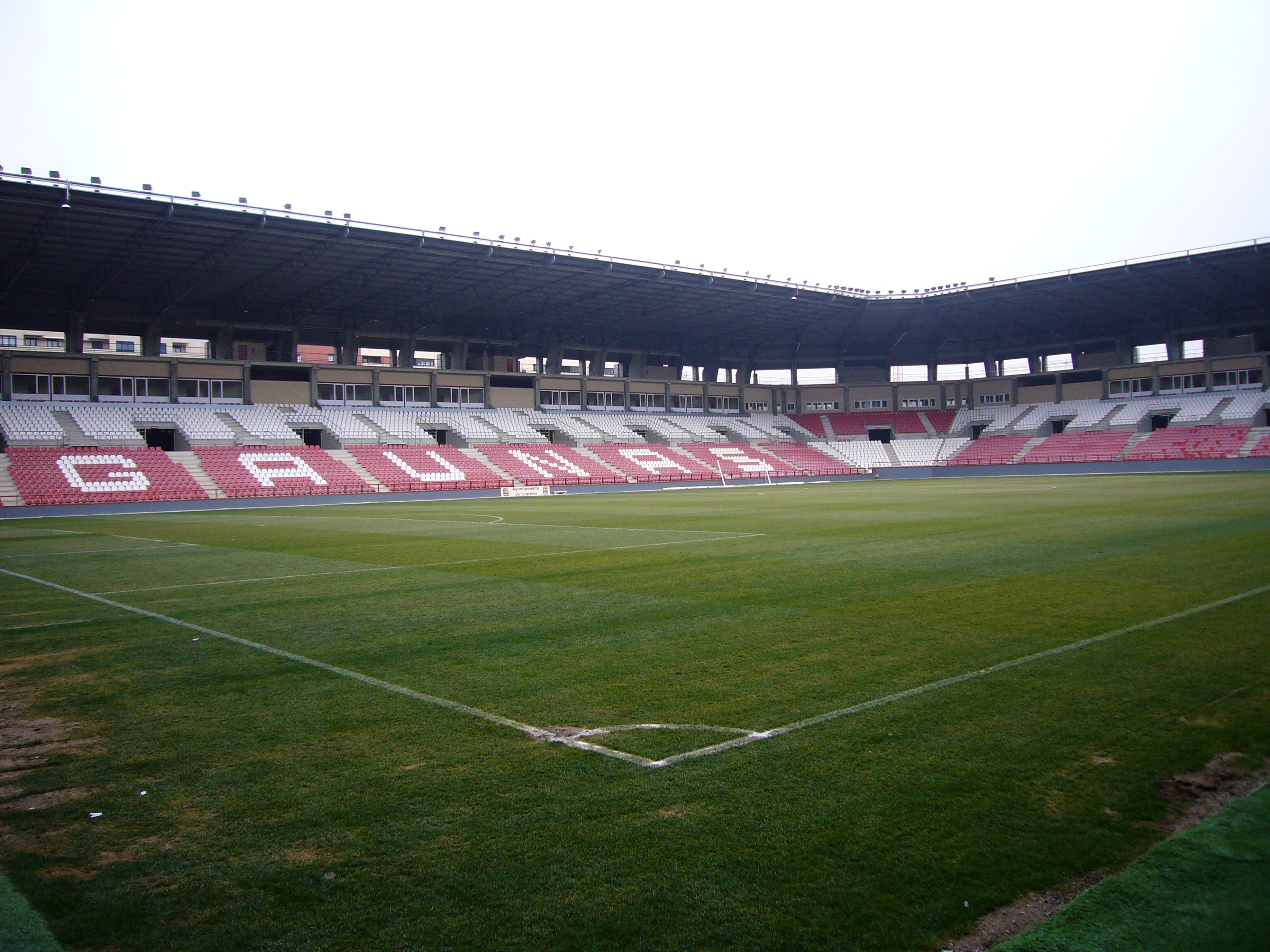
- Interactive map of Estadio Municipal Las Gaunas
- Full name: Estadio Municipal Las Gaunas
- Location: Logroño, Spain
- Coordinates: 42°27′12″N 2°27′12″W
- Owner: Logroño Town Hall
- Capacity: 16,000
- Surface: Grass
- Scoreboard: Yes
- Record attendance: 16,000 (Opening match: CD Logroñés 2-1 Deportivo Alavés on February 28, 2002)
- Field size: 104 metres (114 yd) x 66 metres (72 yd)

Construction
- Built: 1997–2002
- Opened: February 28, 2002
- Cost: €20 million
- Architect: Antonio Lamela
- Main contractor: Grupo ACS

Tenants
- CD Logroñés (2002–2009); Logroñés CF (2004–2008); SD Logroñés (2009-present); UD Logroñés (2009–present); EDF Logroño (2018–present)

Estadio Municipal Las Gaunas is a football stadium in Logroño, La Rioja, Spain. The stadium holds 16,000 spectators and was opened on 28 February 2002. It is the home ground of Segunda Federación club UD Logroñés, and the women's Primera División team EDF Logroño.

== History and events ==
The stadium was opened in 2002 to replace the old stadium with the same name.

On 6 September 2011, it hosted the Spain national football team in a Euro 2012 qualifier against Liechtenstein, which the hosts won 6–0 with braces from Álvaro Negredo and David Villa. Earlier, on 16 October 2002, it staged a goalless friendly draw between Spain and Paraguay.

On 9 October 2015, Las Gaunas hosted the third match of the Spanish national team. This time, a Euro 2016 qualifier against Luxembourg, where Spain won by 4–0 with two goals of Paco Alcácer and other two of Santi Cazorla.

== Attendances ==
This is a list of home attendance figures of UD Logroñés and SD Logroñés at league and playoffs games.

UD Logroñés					SD Logroñés				
Season	Total	High	Low	Average	Season	Total	High	Low	Average
2014–15 Segunda B	56,297	6,758	1,607	2,815					
2015–16 Segunda B	67,821	8,314	1,503	3,230					
2016–17 Segunda B	43,911	3,000	1,883	2,311	2016–17 Tercera	18,476	2,147	600	924
2017–18 Segunda B	59,294	5,536	2,280	3,121	2017–18 Tercera	18,770	3,163	416	939
2018–19 Segunda B	79,386	10,754	2,697	3,780					
2019–20 Segunda B	59,713	6,874	2,624	3,981					
2019–20 Segunda	Season played under closed doors								
2021–22 1ª RFEF	72,188	6,386	2,527	4,246	2021–22 1ª RFEF	19,883	3,362	650	1,243
