= 2021–22 Cádiz CF season =

Cádiz CF
2021–22 season
- President: Manuel Vizcaíno
- Head coach: Álvaro Cervera (until 11 January); Sergio (from 11 January)
- Stadium: Nuevo Mirandilla
- La Liga: 17th
- Copa del Rey: Quarter-finals
- Top goalscorer: League: Anthony Lozano; Álvaro Negredo (7 each); All: Álvaro Negredo (10)
- Highest home attendance: 19,643 vs Real Madrid
- Lowest home attendance: 6,941 vs Levante
- Biggest win: Villa de Fortuna 0–7 Cádiz (Copa del Rey, 2 December 2021)
- Biggest defeat: Getafe 4–0 Cádiz
Home colours	Away colours	Third colours

The 2021–22 season was the 112th season in the existence of Cádiz CF and the club's second consecutive season in the top flight of Spanish football. In addition to the domestic league, Cádiz participated in this season's edition of the Copa del Rey.

== Players ==
=== First-team squad ===
As of 2 February 2022

Note: Flags indicate national team as defined under FIFA eligibility rules; some limited exceptions apply. Players may hold more than one non-FIFA nationality.

No.	Pos.	Nation	Player
1	GK	ARG	Jeremías Ledesma
2	MF	DEN	Jens Jønsson
3	DF	ESP	Fali
4	MF	ESP	Rubén Alcaraz (on loan from Valladolid)
5	DF	ARM	Varazdat Haroyan
6	MF	ESP	José Mari (captain)
7	MF	ESP	Salvi (vice-captain)
8	MF	ESP	Álex Fernández
9	FW	HON	Anthony Lozano
10	MF	ESP	Alberto Perea
11	FW	MAR	Oussama Idrissi (on loan from Sevilla)
12	MF	CHI	Tomás Alarcón
13	GK	ESP	David Gil

No.	Pos.	Nation	Player
14	MF	ESP	Iván Alejo
15	DF	GEQ	Carlos Akapo
16	DF	ESP	Cala
17	FW	ROU	Florin Andone (on loan from Brighton & Hove Albion)
18	FW	ESP	Álvaro Negredo
19	DF	PAR	Santiago Arzamendia
20	DF	ESP	Iza
21	FW	ESP	Rubén Sobrino
22	DF	URU	Pacha Espino (3rd captain)
23	DF	ESP	Luis Hernández
24	MF	ESP	Fede San Emeterio (on loan from Valladolid)
25	FW	ESP	Lucas Pérez
32	DF	ESP	Víctor Chust (on loan from Real Madrid)

=== Out on loan ===
Note: Flags indicate national team as defined under FIFA eligibility rules; some limited exceptions apply. Players may hold more than one non-FIFA nationality.

No.	Pos.	Nation	Player
—	DF	NGR	Saturday Erimuya (at Valladolid Promesas until 30 June 2022)
—	MF	ESP	Álvaro Jiménez (at Ibiza until 30 June 2022)
—	MF	ESP	David Mayoral (at Lugo until 30 June 2022)
—	MF	ESP	Jon Ander Garrido (at Mirandés until 30 June 2022)
—	MF	ESP	Jorge Pombo (at Oviedo until 30 June 2022)
—	MF	ESP	Martín Calderón (at Mirandés until 30 June 2022)

No.	Pos.	Nation	Player
—	FW	ESP	Álvaro Giménez (at Zaragoza until 30 June 2022)
—	FW	ESP	Manuel Nieto (at Andorra until 30 June 2022)
—	FW	MNE	Milutin Osmajić (at Bandırmaspor until 30 June 2022)
—	FW	ESP	Nano Mesa (at Zaragoza until 30 June 2022)
—	FW	ESP	Pedro Benito (at San Fernando until 30 June 2022)
—	FW	ESP	Seth Airam (at Villanovense until 30 June 2022)

== Transfers ==
=== In ===
Date	Player	From	Type	Fee	Ref
30 June 2021	(Spain) Álvaro Giménez	Mallorca	Loan return		
30 June 2021	(Spain) Sergio González	Tenerife	Loan return		
30 June 2021	(Spain) Matos	Málaga	Loan return		
30 June 2021	(Spain) David Mayoral	(Romania) Hermannstadt	Loan return		
30 June 2021	(Spain) Nano Mesa	Logroñés	Loan return		
30 June 2021	(Spain) Gaspar Panadero	Ponferradina	Loan return		
30 June 2021	(Spain) Caye Quintana	Málaga	Loan return		
30 June 2021	(Peru) Jean-Pierre Rhyner	(Netherlands) Emmen	Loan return		
30 June 2021	(Spain) Daniel Sotres	Rayo Majadahonda	Loan return		
1 July 2021	(Chile) Tomás Alarcón	(Chile) O'Higgins	Transfer	€1.8M	
1 July 2021	(Armenia) Varazdat Haroyan	(Kazakhstan) Astana	Transfer	Free	
1 July 2021	(Argentina) Jeremías Ledesma	(Argentina) Rosario Central	Buyout clause	€1.8M	

=== Out ===
Date	Player	To	Type	Fee	Ref
20 May 2021	(Argentina) Augusto Fernández	Retired			
30 June 2021	(Spain) Jairo Izquierdo	Girona	Loan return		
30 June 2021	(Serbia) Ivan Šaponjić	Atlético Madrid	Loan return		
30 June 2021	(Spain) Rubén Sobrino	Valencia	Loan return		

== Pre-season and friendlies ==
Win Draw Loss Fixtures

14 July 2021 Friendly	Barbate	0–6	Cádiz	Benalup-Casas Viejas, Spain
20:30 CEST (UTC+2)		Report	Malbašić 5', 28'; Negredo 11'; Álvaro 57'; Osmajić 69', 73'	Stadium: Campo de Deportes Benalup; Attendance: 0

17 July 2021 Friendly	Atlético Sanluqueño	1–0	Cádiz	Sanlúcar de Barrameda, Spain
20:30 CEST (UTC+2)	Güiza 24'	Report		Stadium: Estadio El Palmar; Attendance: 0 Referee: Francisco Sáez Vital

21 July 2021 Friendly	Linense	0–2	Cádiz	La Línea de la Concepción, Spain
19:00 CEST (UTC+2)		Report	Chapela 78'; Osmajić 90'	Stadium: Estadio Municipal; Attendance: 0 Referee: Manuel Orellana Cid

24 July 2021 Friendly	Algeciras	0–4	Cádiz	Algeciras, Spain
20:30 CEST (UTC+2)		Report	Osmajić 6'; Negredo 46'; Alcalá 69'; Nano 89'	Stadium: Estadio Nuevo Mirador; Referee: José Sánchez Villalobos

27 July 2021 Friendly	Cádiz	0–2	Las Palmas	San Pedro de Alcántara, Spain
19:00 CEST (UTC+2)		Report	Pejiño 8'; Mesa 26'	Stadium: Marbella Football Center; Referee: José María Aranda Delgado

30 July 2021 Friendly	Cádiz	0–2	Espanyol	Marbella, Spain
18:00 CEST (UTC+2)	Osmajić (yellow card) 42'; Negredo (yellow card) 58'; Haroyan (yellow card) 66'	Report	Darder 50'; Melamed 85'	Stadium: Marbella Football Center

1 August 2021 Friendly	Cádiz	1–2	Almería	Marbella, Spain
20:00 CEST (UTC+2)	Osmajić 90+2'	Report	Puigmal 15'; Lazo 64'	Stadium: Marbella Football Center; Referee: Juan Peña Varela

4 August 2021 Ramón de Carranza Trophy	Cádiz	1–1 (4–2 p)	Atlético Madrid	Cádiz, Spain
20:00 CEST (UTC+2)	Alarcón (yellow card) 14'; Perea 86'	Report	Carrasco 41'; Montero (yellow card) 58'	Stadium: Nuevo Mirandilla; Referee: José Luis Munuera Montero
	Penalties
	José Mari (penalty scored); Carcelén (penalty scored); Akapo (penalty scored); Chapela (penalty scored)		(penalty missed) Saúl; (penalty scored) Kondogbia; (penalty scored) Arias; (penalty missed) Simeone

7 August 2021 Friendly	Burnley	0–2	Cádiz	Burnley, England
14:00 BST (UTC+1)		Report	Calderón 45'; Álex 48'	Stadium: Turf Moor; Referee: Ollie Yates

== Competitions ==
=== Overall record ===
Competition	First match	Last match	Starting round	Final position	Record							
Competition	First match	Last match	Starting round	Final position	Pld	W	D	L	GF	GA	GD	Win %
La Liga	14 August 2021	22 May 2022	Matchday 1	17th	38	8	15	15	35	51	−16	21.05
Copa del Rey	2 December 2021	2 February 2022	First round	Quarter-finals	5	3	1	1	10	2	+8	60.00
Total					43	11	16	16	45	53	−8	25.58

Source: Soccerway

=== La Liga ===
==== League table ====
Pos	Team	Pld	W	D	L	GF	GA	GD	Pts	Qualification or relegation
15	Getafe	38	8	15	15	33	41	−8	39 (Note: Head-to-head points: Getafe 8, Mallorca 5, Cádiz 2.)	
16	Mallorca	38	10	9	19	36	63	−27	39	
17	Cádiz	38	8	15	15	35	51	−16	39	
18	Granada (R)	38	8	14	16	44	61	−17	38	Relegation to Segunda División
19	Levante (R)	38	8	11	19	51	76	−25	35	Relegation to Segunda División

Source: LaLiga Santander
Rules for classification: 1) Points; 2) Head-to-head points; 3) Head-to-head goal difference; 4) Goal difference; 5) Goals scored; 6) Fair-play points (Note: Head-to-head record is used only after all the matches between the teams in question have been played)
(R) Relegated

==== Results summary ====
Overall								Home						Away					
Pld	W	D	L	GF	GA	GD	Pts	W	D	L	GF	GA	GD	W	D	L	GF	GA	GD
38	8	15	15	35	51	−16	39	3	9	7	19	24	−5	5	6	8	16	27	−11

Source: La Liga

==== Results by round ====
Round	1	2	3	4	5	6	7	8	9	10	11	12	13	14	15	16	17	18	19	20	21	22	23	24	25	26	27	28	29	30	31	32	33	34	35	36	37	38
Ground	H	A	H	H	A	H	A	H	A	H	A	H	A	A	H	A	H	A	H	A	H	A	A	H	H	A	H	A	H	A	H	A	H	A	H	A	H	A
Result	D	D	L	L	W	D	L	D	L	L	D	D	W	L	L	L	D	D	L	L	D	W	L	D	D	D	W	L	W	D	L	W	L	D	W	L	D	W
Position	8	10	12	13	13	14	14	15	15	17	18	18	16	16	18	18	18	19	19	19	19	18	18	19	18	18	18	18	17	17	18	16	17	17	16	17	18	17

Source: La Liga
A = Away; H = Home; W = Win; D = Draw; L = Loss

==== Matches ====
The league fixtures were announced on 30 June 2021.

14 August 2021 1	Cádiz	1–1	Levante	Cádiz
19:30 CEST (UTC+2)	Espino (yellow card) 28', (goal) 90+7'	Report	Melero (yellow card) 21'; Morales 39', (yellow card) 90+3'; Soldado (yellow card) 47'; Campaña (yellow card) 62'; Duarte (yellow card) 83'	Stadium: Nuevo Mirandilla; Attendance: 6,941; Referee: Santiago Jaime Latre

20 August 2021 2	Real Betis	1–1	Cádiz	Seville
21:00 CEST (UTC+2)	Silva (yellow card) 8'; Juanmi 22'; Montoya (yellow card) 62'; Miranda (yellow card) 90+3'; Ruibal (yellow card) 90+3'	Report	Negredo 11' (pen.)	Stadium: Benito Villamarín; Attendance: 23,102; Referee: Valentín Pizarro Gómez

29 August 2021 3	Cádiz	2–3	Osasuna	Cádiz
19:30 CEST (UTC+2)	Álex 16', 66' (pen.); Lozano (yellow card) 29'; Haroyan (yellow card) 36'; Alarcón (yellow card) 63'; Fali (yellow card) 84'	Report	Barja 60' (pen.); Torres 90+1' (pen.); D. García 90+5'	Stadium: Nuevo Mirandilla; Attendance: 7,452; Referee: Adrián Cordero Vega

12 September 2021 4	Cádiz	0–2	Real Sociedad	Cádiz
18:30 CEST (UTC+2)	Negredo (yellow card) 17'; Espino (yellow card) 42'; Cala (yellow card) 55' (yellow-red card) 83'	Report	Oyarzabal 71', 84' (pen.)	Stadium: Nuevo Mirandilla; Attendance: 11,826; Referee: Alejandro Muñiz Ruiz

17 September 2021 5	Celta Vigo	1–2	Cádiz	Vigo
21:00 CEST (UTC+2)	Galhardo (yellow card) 49'; Mina 65'; Tapia (yellow card) 74'; Méndez (yellow card) 89'	Report	Lozano 38'; Salvi (penalty missed) 43'; Espino 43'; Sobrino (yellow card) 46'; Haroyan (yellow card) 53'; Alarcón (yellow card) 61'	Stadium: Balaídos; Attendance: 6,754; Referee: Isidro Diaz de Mera Escuderos

23 September 2021 6	Cádiz	0–0	Barcelona	Cádiz
22:00 CEST (UTC+2)	Haroyan (yellow card) 68'; Akapo (yellow card) 88'; Alarcón (yellow card) 90'	Report	F. de Jong (yellow card) 61' (yellow-red card) 65'; Roberto (yellow card) 65'; Busquets (yellow card) 90+6'	Stadium: Nuevo Mirandilla; Attendance: 12,180; Referee: Carlos del Cerro Grande

26 September 2021 7	Rayo Vallecano	3–1	Cádiz	Madrid
18:30 CEST (UTC+2)	Á. García 9'; Falcao 44'; Palazón (yellow card) 50', (goal) 87'; Balliu (yellow card) 59'	Report	Haroyan 23', (yellow card) 48'; Bastida (yellow card) 45+1'; Cala (yellow card) 56'; Perea (yellow card) 90+3'	Stadium: Campo de Fútbol de Vallecas; Attendance: 5,903; Referee: Ricardo de Burgos Bengoetxea

2 October 2021 8	Cádiz	0–0	Valencia	Cádiz
18:30 CEST (UTC+2)	Alarcón (yellow card) 41'; Calderón (yellow card) 72'; Alejo (yellow card) 83'	Report	Alderete (yellow card) 13'; Foulquier (yellow card) 46'; Guillamón (yellow card) 57'; Diakhaby (yellow card) 90+4'	Stadium: Nuevo Mirandilla; Attendance: 14,794; Referee: Valentín Pizarro Gómez

18 October 2021 9	Espanyol	2–0	Cádiz	Cornellà de Llobregat
21:00 CEST (UTC+2)	De Tomás 45+1'; Melamed 65'; Gil (yellow card) 68'	Report		Stadium: RCDE Stadium; Attendance: 15,678; Referee: Antonio Mateu Lahoz

23 October 2021 10	Cádiz	0–2	Alavés	Cádiz
16:15 CEST (UTC+2)		Report	Joselu 6' (pen.), 90+1'; Miazga (yellow card) 27'; Navarro (yellow card) 67'	Stadium: Nuevo Mirandilla; Attendance: 13,790; Referee: Javier Alberola Rojas

26 October 2021 11	Villarreal	3–3	Cádiz	Villarreal
21:30 CEST (UTC+2)	Mandi (yellow card) 20'; Torres 43'; Alcácer (yellow card) 45+2'; Coquelin (yellow card) 70'; Dia 80'; Danjuma 90+5'	Report	Lozano 14', 45+1', 52', (yellow card) 50'; Espino (yellow card) 32'; Fali (yellow card) 37'; Alejo (yellow card) 59'; Akapo (yellow card) 89'; Haroyan (yellow card) 90+1'	Stadium: Estadio de la Cerámica; Attendance: 12,190; Referee: Alejandro Hernández Hernández

31 October 2021 12	Cádiz	1–1	Mallorca	Cádiz
14:00 CET (UTC+1)	Fali (yellow card) 20'; Cala (yellow card) 77'; Alarcón (yellow card) 90+1'; Negredo 90+3' (pen.)	Report	Amath (yellow card) 18'; Baba 29', (yellow card) 74'; Rodríguez (yellow card) 31'; Sedlar (yellow card) 51' (yellow-red card) 87'; Lee (yellow card) 90+1'; Reina (yellow card) 90+2'	Stadium: Nuevo Mirandilla; Attendance: 11,790; Referee: Valentín Pizarro Gómez

5 November 2021 13	Athletic Bilbao	0–1	Cádiz	Bilbao
21:00 CET (UTC+1)	Yeray (yellow card) 27'; Morcillo (yellow card) 69'; N. Williams (yellow card) 90+2'	Report	Salvi 6'; Haroyan (yellow card) 85'	Stadium: San Mamés; Attendance: 37,581; Referee: Santiago Jaime Latre

21 November 2021 14	Getafe	4–0	Cádiz	Getafe
14:00 CET (UTC+1)	Olivera 7'; Sandro (yellow card) 51'; Cuenca 60'; Ünal 81'; Mata 90+4'; Mitrović (yellow card) 90+5'	Report	Perea (yellow card) 58'; Álex (yellow card) 62'; Haroyan (yellow card) 69'; Cala (yellow card) 78'	Stadium: Coliseum Alfonso Pérez; Attendance: 8,825; Referee: Ricardo de Burgos Bengoetxea

28 November 2021 15	Cádiz	1–4	Atlético Madrid	Cádiz
18:30 CET (UTC+1)	Álex (yellow card) 24'; Jønsson (yellow card) 82'; Lozano 86'	Report	Lemar 56'; Griezmann 70'; Correa 76'; Cunha 86'	Stadium: Nuevo Mirandilla; Attendance: 16,861; Referee: Jesús Gil Manzano

5 December 2021 16	Elche	3–1	Cádiz	Elche
16:15 CET (UTC+1)	Palacios (yellow card) 2'; Fidel 13' (pen.), (yellow card) 26'; Roco (yellow card) 22'; Marcone (yellow card) 28'; González (yellow card) 70'; Morente 75', (yellow card) 83'; Gumbau (yellow card) 80'; Josan 90+3'	Report	Álex (penalty missed) 25', 90+1'; Haroyan (yellow card) 58'; Lozano (yellow card) 70'; Akapo (yellow card) 78'	Stadium: Estadio Manuel Martínez Valero; Attendance: 11,879; Referee: Alejandro Muñiz Ruiz

13 December 2021 17	Cádiz	1–1	Granada	Cádiz
21:00 CET (UTC+1)	Arzamendia 32'; Lozano (yellow card) 37'; Salvi (yellow card) 61' (yellow-red card) 90+2'; Cala (yellow card) 90+1'; Marcos Mauro (yellow card) 90+4'	Report	Molina 88'	Stadium: Nuevo Mirandilla; Attendance: 13,052; Referee: Miguel Ángel Ortiz Arias

19 December 2021 18	Real Madrid	0–0	Cádiz	Madrid
21:00 CET (UTC+1)	Casemiro (yellow card) 26'	Report	Cala (yellow card) 64'	Stadium: Santiago Bernabéu; Attendance: 38,818; Referee: Santiago Jaime Latre

3 January 2022 19	Cádiz	0–1	Sevilla	Cádiz
21:15 CET (UTC+1)		Report	Ocampos 58'; Augustinsson (yellow card) 79'	Stadium: Nuevo Mirandilla; Attendance: 14,342; Referee: Javier Alberola Rojas

9 January 2022 20	Osasuna	2–0	Cádiz	Pamplona
18:30 CET (UTC+1)	Budimir 38'; Barja 48'; Cruz (yellow card) 55'; Torró (yellow card) 59'	Report	Arzamendia (yellow card) 55'; Andone (yellow card) 71'	Stadium: El Sadar; Attendance: 16,292; Referee: Ricardo De Burgos Bengoetxea

18 January 2022 21	Cádiz	2–2	Espanyol	Cádiz
21:30 CET (UTC+1)	Fali (yellow card) 46'; Negredo 55'; Espino (yellow card) 58'; Alejo (yellow card) 74', (goal) 90+1'; Ledesma (yellow card) 81'	Report	Morlanes 10'; Cabrera (yellow card) 80'; De Tomás 90+6'	Stadium: Nuevo Mirandilla; Attendance: 10,755; Referee: Alejandro Muñiz Ruiz

22 January 2022 22	Levante	0–2	Cádiz	Valencia
14:00 CET (UTC+1)	Bardhi (yellow card) 49'; Clerc (yellow card) 68'; Fernández (yellow card) 76'; Morales (yellow card) 76'	Report	Fali (yellow card) 23'; Negredo 34'; Lozano (yellow card) 50'; Salvi (yellow card) 59', (goal) 74'; Ledesma (yellow card) 68'; Alejo (yellow card) 76'; Haroyan (yellow card) 90'	Stadium: Ciutat de València; Attendance: 14,063; Referee: César Soto Grado

5 February 2022 23	Mallorca	2–1	Cádiz	Palma
16:15 CET (UTC+1)	Sevilla 20' (pen.); Muriqi 66' (pen.); Ruiz de Galarreta (yellow card) 69'; Amath (yellow card) 77'	Report	Alcaraz 8'; Carcelén (yellow card) 59'; Ledesma (yellow card) 64'; Pérez (yellow card) 65'; Chust (yellow card) 84'	Stadium: Visit Mallorca Stadium; Attendance: 13,226; Referee: Carlos del Cerro Grande

12 February 2022 24	Cádiz	0–0	Celta Vigo	Cádiz
14:00 CET (UTC+1)	Ledesma (yellow card) 82'; Jønsson (yellow card) 88'; Hernández (yellow card) 90+4'	Report	Cervi (yellow card) 25'; Galán (yellow card) 52'; Mina (penalty missed) 84'	Stadium: Nuevo Mirandilla; Attendance: 15,635; Referee: Antonio Mateu Lahoz

19 February 2022 25	Cádiz	1–1	Getafe	Cádiz
18:30 CET (UTC+1)	Negredo (yellow card) 6', (goal) 45+2'; Espino (yellow card) 32'; Alcaraz (yellow card) 35'	Report	Mayoral 6' (pen.); Yokuşlu (yellow card) 19'; Arambarri (yellow card) 51'; Suárez (yellow card) 82'; Jankto (yellow card) 90+4'	Stadium: Nuevo Mirandilla; Attendance: 15,948; Referee: Javier Alberola Rojas

28 February 2022 26	Granada	0–0	Cádiz	Granada
21:00 CET (UTC+1)	Duarte (red card) 33'; Sánchez (yellow card) 35'; Uzuni (yellow card) 42'; Torrente (yellow card) 79'	Report	Arzamendia (yellow card) 32'; Alcaraz (yellow card) 48'; San Emeterio (yellow card) 74'	Stadium: Nuevo Los Cármenes; Attendance: 14,785; Referee: José María Sánchez Martínez

6 March 2022 27	Cádiz	2–0	Rayo Vallecano	Cádiz
14:00 CET (UTC+1)	Akapo (yellow card) 10'; Alcaraz (yellow card) 37', (goal) 55'; Idrissi (yellow card) 45+1', (goal) 63'; Alejo (yellow card) 65'; Sobrino (yellow card) 82'	Report	Palazón (yellow card) 12'; Á. García (yellow card) 45+2'; Maraš (yellow card) 62'	Stadium: Nuevo Mirandilla; Attendance: 15,677; Referee: César Soto Grado

11 March 2022 28	Atlético Madrid	2–1	Cádiz	Madrid
21:00 CET (UTC+1)	Félix 3'; De Paul (yellow card) 30', (goal) 68'; Carrasco (yellow card) 35'; Mandava (yellow card) 41'; Serrano (red card) 88'; Savić (yellow card) 90+1'	Report	Sobrino (yellow card) 33'; Negredo 45'	Stadium: Wanda Metropolitano; Attendance: 50,573; Referee: Pablo González Fuertes

20 March 2022 29	Cádiz	1–0	Villarreal	Cádiz
16:15 CET (UTC+1)	Lozano (yellow card) 31'; Idrissi (yellow card) 48'; San Emeterio (yellow card) 55'; Sobrino 90'	Report	Torres (yellow card) 31'; Capoue (yellow card) 48'	Stadium: Nuevo Mirandilla; Attendance: 13,325; Referee: Alejandro Hernández Hernández

3 April 2022 30	Valencia	0–0	Cádiz	Valencia
18:30 CEST (UTC+2)	Alderete (yellow card) 60'; Gabriel (yellow card) 67'; Diakhaby (yellow card) 90+6'	Report	San Emeterio (yellow card) 33'; Alejo (yellow card) 58'; Alcaraz (yellow card) 77'; José Mari (yellow card) 86' (yellow-red card) 90+6'; Lozano (yellow card) 87'	Stadium: Mestalla; Attendance: 32,949; Referee: Isidro Díaz de Mera Escuderos

9 April 2022 31	Cádiz	1–2	Real Betis	Cádiz
14:00 CEST (UTC+2)	Alejo 58'; Alcaraz (yellow card) 66'	Report	Sabaly (yellow card) 25'; Tello 78'; Iglesias 85' (pen.); Bartra (yellow card) 89'	Stadium: Nuevo Mirandilla; Attendance: 18,063; Referee: Jesús Gil Manzano

18 April 2022 32	Barcelona	0–1	Cádiz	Barcelona
21:00 CEST (UTC+2)	Busquets (yellow card) 42'; Dest (yellow card) 70'; Torres (yellow card) 90+4'; Alba (yellow card) 90+8'	Report	Pérez 48'; Hernández (yellow card) 61'	Stadium: Camp Nou; Attendance: 57,495; Referee: Santiago Jaime Latre

21 April 2022 33	Cádiz	2–3	Athletic Bilbao	Cádiz
20:00 CEST (UTC+2)	Lozano (yellow card) 9'; Chust (yellow card) 21'; Pérez 56'; Cala (yellow card) 63'; Sobrino 87'	Report	R. García 3'; Muniain (penalty missed) 22', 22'; Vesga 33', (yellow card) 63' (yellow-red card) 71'; Martínez (yellow card) 50'; Vivian (yellow card) 69'; Vencedor (yellow card) 90+6'	Stadium: Nuevo Mirandilla; Attendance: 17,360; Referee: Valentín Pizarro Gómez

29 April 2022 34	Sevilla	1–1	Cádiz	Seville
21:00 CEST (UTC+2)	En-Nesyri 7'; Gómez (yellow card) 61'; Navas (yellow card) 78'	Report	Jønsson (yellow card) 17'; Pérez 66'; Espino (yellow card) 90'	Stadium: Ramón Sánchez Pizjuán; Attendance: 27,113; Referee: José María Sánchez Martínez

7 May 2022 35	Cádiz	3–0	Elche	Cádiz
18:30 CEST (UTC+2)	Hernández (yellow card) 20'; Negredo 80'; Sobrino 83'; Lozano 90+3'	Report	Ponce (red card) 66'	Stadium: Nuevo Mirandilla; Attendance: 17,615; Referee: Alejandro Hernández Hernández

12 May 2022 36	Real Sociedad	3–0	Cádiz	San Sebastián
19:00 CEST (UTC+2)	Sørloth 19'; Januzaj 53' (pen.); Rafinha (yellow card) 60'; Silva (yellow card) 63'; Zubeldia (yellow card) 66'; Portu 90+8' (pen.), (yellow card) 90+8'	Report	José Mari (yellow card) 4'; Alcaraz (yellow card) 82'	Stadium: Anoeta; Attendance: 29,014; Referee: Juan Martínez Munuera

15 May 2022 37	Cádiz	1–1	Real Madrid	Cádiz
19:30 CEST (UTC+2)	Sobrino 37', (yellow card) 42'; Negredo (penalty missed) 61', (yellow card) 81'; Carcelén (yellow card) 84'; Alcaraz (yellow card) 86'; Hernández (yellow card) 88'; Fali (yellow card) 90+2'	Report	Mariano 5'; Nacho (yellow card) 48'; Hazard (yellow card) 74'	Stadium: Nuevo Mirandilla; Attendance: 19,643; Referee: Antonio Mateu Lahoz

22 May 2022 38	Alavés	0–1	Cádiz	Vitoria-Gasteiz
20:00 CEST (UTC+2)		Report	Hernández (yellow card) 27'; Lozano 76'	Stadium: Mendizorrotza; Attendance: 11,138; Referee: José María Sánchez Martínez

=== Copa del Rey ===
2 December 2021 First round	Villa de Fortuna	0–7	Cádiz	Murcia
21:00 CET (UTC+1)	Gómez (yellow card) 80'	Report	Negredo 3', 52', 90'; Jiménez 13'; Akapo (yellow card) 61'; Marcos Mauro 79'; Calderón 81'; Osmajić 86'	Stadium: Nueva Condomina (Note: Villa de Fortuna played its game at Nueva Condomina, in Murcia instead of their regular stadium José Luis Belda in Fortuna as it does not meet the requirements established by the Royal Spanish Football Federation.); Referee: Juan Martínez Munuera

16 December 2021 Second round	Albacete	0–1	Cádiz	Albacete
21:00 CET (UTC+1)	Llinares (yellow card) 1'; Andrasa (yellow card) 70'; Sánchez (yellow card) 90+2'; Rosić (red card) 90+2'; R. Martínez (yellow card) 90+4'	Report	Andone 20'; Fali (yellow card) 41'	Stadium: Carlos Belmonte; Referee: José María Sánchez Martínez

6 January 2022 Round of 32	Fuenlabrada	0–1	Cádiz	Fuenlabrada
16:00 CET (UTC+1)	Konaté (yellow card) 86'	Report	Osmajić (yellow card) 50'; Chust (yellow card) 75'; Alarcón 90+3'	Stadium: Fernando Torres; Referee: Jesús Gil Manzano

15 January 2022 Round of 16	Sporting Gijón	0–0 (a.e.t.) (2–4 p)	Cádiz	Gijón
18:30 CET (UTC+1)	Kravets (yellow card) 94'; Villalba (yellow card) 95'	Report	Fali (yellow card) 64'	Stadium: El Molinón-Enrique Castro "Quini"; Referee: Miguel Ángel Ortiz Arias
	Penalties
	Villalba (penalty missed); Díaz (penalty missed); Kravets (penalty scored); Campuzano (penalty scored)		(penalty scored) Fernández; (penalty scored) Negredo; (penalty scored) Perea; (penalty scored) Arzamendia

2 February 2022 Quarter-finals	Valencia	2–1	Cádiz	Valencia
21:00 CET (UTC+1)	Guedes 24'; Gayà (yellow card) 34'; Cömert (yellow card) 53'; Duro 79'; Gómez (yellow card) 87'	Report	Alejo (yellow card) 38'; Pérez 54' (pen.); Alcaraz (yellow card) 59'; Sobrino (yellow card) 61'; Cala (yellow card) 71' (yellow-red card) 84'; Parra (yellow card) 87'	Stadium: Mestalla; Attendance: 30,591; Referee: Javier Alberola Rojas

== Statistics ==
=== Goalscorers ===
As of 22 May 2022

Rank	Player	La Liga	Copa del Rey	Total
1	(Spain) Álvaro Negredo	7	3	10
2	(Honduras) Anthony Lozano	7	0	7
3	(Spain) Lucas Pérez	3	1	4
3	(Spain) Rubén Sobrino	4	0	4
5	(Spain) Álex Fernández	3	0	3
6	(Spain) Iván Alejo	2	0	2
6	(Spain) Rubén Alcaraz	2	0	2
6	(Uruguay) Alfonso Espino	2	0	2
6	(Spain) Salvi	2	0	2
Total		35	10	45
