= 2020–21 Cádiz CF season =

Cádiz CF
2020–21 season
- President: Manuel Vizcaíno
- Head coach: Álvaro Cervera
- Stadium: Ramón de Carranza
- La Liga: 12th
- Copa del Rey: Round of 32
- Top goalscorer: League: Álvaro Negredo (8); All: Álvaro Negredo (8)
- Biggest win: Huesca 0–2 Cádiz; Eibar 0–2 Cádiz; Ribadumia 0–2 Cádiz; Cádiz 3–1 Alavés
- Biggest defeat: Atlético Madrid 4–0 Cádiz; Celta Vigo 4–0 Cádiz; Cádiz 0–4 Athletic Bilbao
Home colours	Away colours	Third colours
- All statistics correct as of 21 May 2021.

The 2020–21 season was the 111th season in the existence of Cádiz CF and the club's first season back in the top flight of Spanish football since 2006. In addition to the domestic league, Cádiz CF participated in this season's edition of the Copa del Rey. The season covered the period from 21 July 2020 to 30 June 2021, with the late start to the season due to the COVID-19 pandemic in Spain.

== Players ==
=== First-team squad ===
As of 1 February 2021

Note: Flags indicate national team as defined under FIFA eligibility rules; some limited exceptions apply. Players may hold more than one non-FIFA nationality.

No.	Pos.	Nation	Player
1	GK	ARG	Jeremías Ledesma (on loan from Rosario Central)
2	MF	DEN	Jens Jønsson
3	DF	ESP	Fali
4	DF	ARG	Marcos Mauro
5	MF	ESP	Jon Ander Garrido (captain)
6	MF	ESP	José Mari (vice-captain)
7	MF	ESP	Salvi (3rd captain)
8	MF	ESP	Álex Fernández (4th captain)
9	FW	HON	Anthony Lozano
10	MF	ESP	Alberto Perea
11	MF	ESP	Jorge Pombo
12	FW	SRB	Ivan Šaponjić (on loan from Atlético Madrid)

No.	Pos.	Nation	Player
13	GK	ESP	David Gil
14	MF	ESP	Iván Alejo
15	DF	GEQ	Carlos Akapo
16	DF	ESP	Juan Cala
17	MF	ARG	Augusto Fernández
18	FW	ESP	Álvaro Negredo
19	DF	ESP	Pedro Alcalá
20	DF	ESP	Isaac Carcelén
21	FW	ESP	Rubén Sobrino (on loan from Valencia)
22	DF	URU	Pacha Espino
24	MF	SRB	Filip Malbašić
25	MF	ESP	Jairo Izquierdo (on loan from Girona)

=== Players under contract ===
Note: Flags indicate national team as defined under FIFA eligibility rules; some limited exceptions apply. Players may hold more than one non-FIFA nationality.

No.	Pos.	Nation	Player
—	DF	DOM	Luismi Quezada

=== Out on loan ===
Note: Flags indicate national team as defined under FIFA eligibility rules; some limited exceptions apply. Players may hold more than one non-FIFA nationality.

No.	Pos.	Nation	Player
—	GK	ESP	Dani Sotres (at Rayo Majadahonda until 30 June 2021)
—	DF	ESP	José Matos (at Málaga until 30 June 2021)
—	DF	PER	Jean-Pierre Rhyner (at FC Emmen until 30 June 2021)
—	DF	ESP	Sergio González (at Tenerife until 30 June 2021)
—	MF	ESP	David Mayoral (at Hermannstadt until 30 June 2021)
—	MF	ESP	Gaspar Panadero (at Ponferradina until 30 June 2021)

No.	Pos.	Nation	Player
—	MF	ESP	Joel Jorquera (at Hospitalet until 30 June 2021)
—	FW	ESP	Álvaro Giménez (at Mallorca until 30 June 2021)
—	FW	ESP	Nano (at Logroñés until 30 June 2021)
—	FW	ESP	Caye Quintana (at Málaga until 30 June 2021)
—	FW	ESP	Seth Airam (at Recreativo until 30 June 2021)

== Transfers ==
=== In ===
Date	Player	From	Type	Fee	Ref
30 June 2020	(Panama) Cristian Martínez	Recreativo	Loan return		
30 June 2020	(Spain) Matos	(Netherlands) Twente	Loan return		
19 July 2020	(Serbia) Đorđe Jovanović	Cartagena	Loan return		
20 July 2020	(Spain) David Carmona	Racing Santander	Loan return		
20 July 2020	(Spain) Brian Oliván	Girona	Loan return		
20 July 2020	(Spain) Javi Navarro	Ponferradina	Loan return		
20 July 2020	(Spain) David Querol	Albacete	Loan return		
20 July 2020	(Spain) Caye Quintana	Fuenlabrada	Loan return		
20 July 2020	(Spain) Dani Romera	Alcorcón	Loan return		
20 July 2020	(Spain) Sergio Sánchez	Albacete	Loan return		
4 August 2020	(Spain) Iván Alejo	Getafe	Buyout clause	€3M	
4 August 2020	(Spain) Álvaro Giménez	(England) Birmingham City	Buyout clause	€2.7M	
4 August 2020	(Honduras) Anthony Lozano	Girona	Buyout clause	€2.5M	
4 August 2020	(Serbia) Filip Malbašić	Tenerife	Buyout clause	€1M	
4 August 2020	(Spain) Nano	Eibar	Buyout clause	€1.4M	
4 August 2020	(Spain) Álvaro Negredo	(United Arab Emirates) Al-Nasr	Transfer	Free	
4 August 2020	(Spain) Jorge Pombo	Zaragoza	Buyout clause	€1.2M	

=== Out ===
Date	Player	To	Type	Fee	Ref
7 September 2020	(Spain) David Mayoral	(Romania) Hermannstadt	Loan		
7 September 2020	(Spain) Caye Quintana	Málaga	Loan		
9 September 2020	(Spain) Brian Oliván	Mallorca	Transfer	Free	
16 September 2020	(Spain) Matos	Málaga	Loan		
16 September 2020	(Spain) Javi Navarro	Albacete	Loan		
22 September 2020	(Spain) Dani Romera	Ponferradina	Transfer	Free	
24 September 2020	(Spain) Daniel Sotres	Rayo Majadahonda	Loan		
2 October 2020	(Spain) José Manuel Jurado	Termination of contract			

== Pre-season and friendlies ==
Win Draw Loss

22 August 2020 Friendly	Real Betis	1–0	Cádiz	San Pedro de Alcántara, Spain
19:30 CEST (UTC+2)	Juanmi 87'	Report		Stadium: Marbella Football Center; Attendance: 0

26 August 2020 Friendly	Málaga	1–2	Cádiz	Marbella, Spain
19:00 CEST (UTC+2)	Hoyos 13'	Report	Mauro 29'; González 90+2'	Stadium: Dama de Noche Pitches; Attendance: 0

30 August 2020 Friendly	Cádiz	1–0	Espanyol	San Pedro de Alcántara, Spain
18:45 CEST (UTC+2)	Mauro 53'	Report		Stadium: Marbella Football Center; Attendance: 0

2 September 2020 Friendly	Alcorcón	Cancelled	Cádiz	San Pedro de Alcántara, Spain
19:00 CEST (UTC+2)				Stadium: Marbella Football Center

4 September 2020 Friendly	Granada	Cancelled	Cádiz	San Pedro de Alcántara, Spain
19:30 CEST (UTC+2)				Stadium: Marbella Football Center

9 September 2020 Friendly	Cádiz	1–1	Almería	San Pedro de Alcántara, Spain
19:30 CEST (UTC+2)	Negredo 44' (pen.)	Report	Albiar 54'	Stadium: Marbella Football Center; Attendance: 0 Referee: Alejandro Ruiz Aguilera

== Competitions ==
=== Overview ===
Competition	First match	Last match	Starting round	Final position	Record							
Competition	First match	Last match	Starting round	Final position	Pld	W	D	L	GF	GA	GD	Win %
La Liga	12 September 2020	21 May 2021	Matchday 1	12th	38	11	11	16	36	58	−22	28.95
Copa del Rey	17 December 2020	16 January 2021	First round	Round of 32	3	1	1	1	2	2	+0	33.33
Total					41	12	12	17	38	60	−22	29.27

Source: Soccerway

=== La Liga ===
==== League table ====
Pos	Team	Pld	W	D	L	GF	GA	GD	Pts
10	Athletic Bilbao	38	11	13	14	46	42	+4	46 (Note: Granada finished ahead of Athletic Bilbao on head-to-head goal difference: Granada 2–0 Athletic Bilbao, Athletic Bilbao 2–1 Granada.)
11	Osasuna	38	11	11	16	37	48	−11	44 (Note: Osasuna finished ahead of Cádiz on head-to-head points: Cádiz 0–2 Osasuna, Osasuna 3–2 Cádiz.)
12	Cádiz	38	11	11	16	36	58	−22	44
13	Valencia	38	10	13	15	50	53	−3	43
14	Levante	38	9	14	15	46	57	−11	41

Source: La Liga
Rules for classification: 1) Points; 2) Head-to-head points; 3) Head-to-head goal difference; 4) Goal difference; 5) Goals scored; 6) Fair-play points (Note: Head-to-head record is used only after all the matches between the teams in question have been played)

==== Results summary ====
Overall								Home						Away					
Pld	W	D	L	GF	GA	GD	Pts	W	D	L	GF	GA	GD	W	D	L	GF	GA	GD
38	11	11	16	36	58	−22	44	5	5	9	17	30	−13	6	6	7	19	28	−9

Source: La Liga

==== Results by round ====
Round	1	2	3	4	5	6	7	8	9	10	11	12	13	14	15	16	17	18	19	20	21	22	23	24	25	26	27	28	29	30	31	32	33	34	35	36	37	38
Ground	H	A	H	A	H	A	H	A	A	H	A	H	A	H	A	H	A	H	H	A	H	A	H	A	H	H	A	A	H	A	H	A	H	A	H	A	H	A
Result	L	W	L	W	D	W	D	W	L	L	D	W	L	L	L	D	D	W	D	L	L	L	L	D	L	W	D	L	W	W	L	D	D	W	W	L	L	D
Position	20	8	15	8	9	5	6	5	6	5	6	5	7	9	11	9	10	9	9	11	13	14	15	14	15	14	14	15	13	12	13	13	13	12	11	12	12	12

Source: La Liga
A = Away; H = Home; W = Win; D = Draw; L = Loss

==== Matches ====
The league fixtures were announced on 31 August 2020.

12 September 2020 1	Cádiz	0–2	Osasuna	Cádiz
21:00 CEST (UTC+2)	Malbašić (yellow card) 58'; Alejo (yellow card) 90'	Report	Adrián 10'; D. García (yellow card) 35'; Cruz (yellow card) 65'; R. García 79'	Stadium: Ramón de Carranza; Attendance: 0 (Note: The match was played behind closed doors due to the COVID-19 pandemic in Spain.); Referee: Isidro Díaz de Mera Escuderos

20 September 2020 2	Huesca	0–2	Cádiz	Huesca
16:00 CEST (UTC+2)	Pulido (yellow card) 16'; Ferreiro (yellow card) 50'; Siovas (yellow card) 76'	Report	Negredo 11'; Cala (yellow card) 29'; Espino (yellow card) 58'; Pombo (yellow card) 64', (goal) 83'	Stadium: Estadio El Alcoraz; Attendance: 0 Referee: César Soto Grado

27 September 2020 3	Cádiz	1–3	Sevilla	Cádiz
18:30 CEST (UTC+2)	Salvi 48'; Cala (yellow card) 78'; Fernández (yellow card) 90+1'; Marcos Mauro (yellow card) 90+2'; Fali (yellow card) 90+6'	Report	Gudelj (yellow card) 58'; De Jong 65'; Suso (yellow card) 67'; Munir 90'; Rakitić 90+4'	Stadium: Ramón de Carranza; Attendance: 0 Referee: David Medié Jiménez

1 October 2020 4	Athletic Bilbao	0–1	Cádiz	Bilbao
19:00 CEST (UTC+2)	Villalibre (yellow card) 54'; Kodro (yellow card) 79'; Martínez (yellow card) 83'	Report	Akapo (yellow card) 18' (yellow-red card) 48'; Fali (yellow card) 41'; López 57' (o.g.); Negredo (yellow card) 63' (yellow-red card) 70'	Stadium: San Mamés; Attendance: 0 Referee: Pablo González Fuertes

4 October 2020 5	Cádiz	1–1	Granada	Cádiz
18:30 CEST (UTC+2)	José Mari (yellow card) 45'; Alejo 48'; Espino (yellow card) 60'	Report	Germán 27', (yellow card) 53'; Kenedy (yellow card) 56'	Stadium: Ramón de Carranza; Attendance: 0 Referee: Javier Alberola Rojas

17 October 2020 6	Real Madrid	0–1	Cádiz	Madrid
18:30 CEST (UTC+2)	Ramos (yellow card) 34'; Militão (yellow card) 90+2'	Report	Lozano 16'	Stadium: Alfredo Di Stéfano; Attendance: 0 Referee: Santiago Jaime Latre

25 October 2020 7	Cádiz	0–0	Villarreal	Cádiz
16:00 CET (UTC+1)	Salvi (yellow card) 33'; Jairo (yellow card) 90+2'	Report	Mario (yellow card) 6'; Pedraza (yellow card) 90+1'	Stadium: Ramón de Carranza; Attendance: 0 Referee: Ricardo de Burgos Bengoetxea

30 October 2020 8	Eibar	0–2	Cádiz	Eibar
21:00 CET (UTC+1)	Burgos (yellow card) 70'	Report	Negredo 36'; Salvi 39'; Lozano (yellow card) 64'	Stadium: Ipurua; Attendance: 0 Referee: Antonio Mateu Lahoz

7 November 2020 9	Atlético Madrid	4–0	Cádiz	Madrid
21:00 CET (UTC+1)	Félix 8', 90+1'; Llorente 22'; Suárez 51'; Kondogbia (yellow card) 85'	Report	Jønsson (yellow card) 57'	Stadium: Wanda Metropolitano; Attendance: 0 Referee: Adrián Cordero Vega

22 November 2020 10	Cádiz	0–1	Real Sociedad	Cádiz
16:15 CET (UTC+1)	Garrido (yellow card) 13'; Fali (yellow card) 17'	Report	Isak 66'; Guevara (yellow card) 88'	Stadium: Ramón de Carranza; Attendance: 0 Referee: Xavier Estrada Fernández

28 November 2020 11	Elche	1–1	Cádiz	Elche
14:00 CET (UTC+1)	Gonzalo (yellow card) 12'; Boyé (yellow card) 12' (yellow-red card) 45+4', (goal) 38'; Milla (yellow card) 60'; Marcone (yellow card) 64'; Morente (yellow card) 90+4'	Report	Fernández (yellow card) 54'; Giménez 55'; Jønsson (yellow card) 68'	Stadium: Estadio Manuel Martínez Valero; Attendance: 0 Referee: Carlos del Cerro Grande

5 December 2020 12	Cádiz	2–1	Barcelona	Cádiz
21:00 CET (UTC+1)	Giménez 8'; Negredo 63'	Report	Alcalá 57' (o.g.); Lenglet (yellow card) 61'; Alba (yellow card) 86'	Stadium: Ramón de Carranza; Attendance: 0 Referee: César Soto Grado

14 December 2020 13	Celta Vigo	4–0	Cádiz	Vigo
21:00 CET (UTC+1)	Nolito 6'; Aspas 31' (pen.); Beltrán 43'; Méndez 45+1'; Suárez (yellow card) 54'; Araujo (yellow card) 57'	Report	Mauro (yellow card) 59'	Stadium: Balaídos; Attendance: 0 Referee: Guillermo Cuadra Fernández

20 December 2020 14	Cádiz	0–2	Getafe	Cádiz
18:30 CET (UTC+1)	Cala (yellow card) 23'	Report	Hernández 33', (yellow card) 39'; Cucurella (yellow card) 42'; Cabaco (yellow card) 57'; Nyom (yellow card) 64'; Olivera (yellow card) 74'; Yáñez (yellow card) 90+1'; Maksimović 90+4'	Stadium: Ramón de Carranza; Attendance: 0 Referee: Santiago Jaime Latre

23 December 2020 15	Real Betis	1–0	Cádiz	Seville
22:00 CET (UTC+1)	Sanabria (yellow card) 58'; Rodríguez 71'	Report	Malbašić (yellow card) 37'	Stadium: Estadio Benito Villamarín; Attendance: 0 Referee: Antonio Mateu Lahoz

29 December 2020 16	Cádiz	0–0	Valladolid	Cádiz
21:30 CET (UTC+1)	Fali (yellow card) 26'; Alejo (yellow card) 27'; Lozano (yellow card) 33'	Report	Mesa (yellow card) 6'; El Yamiq (yellow card) 45'	Stadium: Ramón de Carranza; Attendance: 0 Referee: Alejandro Hernández Hernández

4 January 2021 17	Valencia	1–1	Cádiz	Valencia
21:00 CET (UTC+1)	Cheryshev (yellow card) 16'; Guillamón (yellow card) 18'; Gómez 79'	Report	Lozano (yellow card) 36', (goal) 58'; Negredo (yellow card) 69'	Stadium: Mestalla; Attendance: 0 Referee: David Medié Jiménez

10 January 2021 18	Cádiz	3–1	Alavés	Cádiz
16:15 CET (UTC+1)	Álex 15'; Fali (yellow card) 22'; Lozano 56'; Negredo 68'	Report	Joselu 23' (pen.); Pina (yellow card) 40'; Deyverson (yellow card) 44'; Tachi (yellow card) 45+2' (yellow-red card) 50'	Stadium: Ramón de Carranza; Attendance: 0 Referee: José María Sánchez Martínez

19 January 2021 19	Cádiz	2–2	Levante	Cádiz
19:00 CET (UTC+1)	Perea 4'; Cala 28', (yellow card) 80'; Lozano (yellow card) 79'; Alcalá (yellow card) 85'	Report	Roger 8', 11'; Duarte (yellow card) 64'	Stadium: Ramón de Carranza; Attendance: 0 Referee: Carlos del Cerro Grande

23 January 2021 20	Sevilla	3–0	Cádiz	Seville
16:15 CET (UTC+1)	En-Nesyri 35', 39', 62'; Gudelj (yellow card) 90+4'	Report	Alcalá (yellow card) 37'; Salvi (yellow card) 45+1'; Cala (yellow card) 81'	Stadium: Ramón Sánchez Pizjuán; Attendance: 0 Referee: Guillermo Cuadra Fernández

31 January 2021 21	Cádiz	2–4	Atlético Madrid	Cádiz
16:15 CET (UTC+1)	Negredo 35', 71'; Jairo (yellow card) 40'	Report	Suárez 28', 50' (pen.); Torreira (yellow card) 38'; Félix (yellow card) 41'; Saúl 44'; Vrsaljko (yellow card) 73'; Koke (yellow card) 77', (goal) 88'; Kondogbia (yellow card) 85'	Stadium: Ramón de Carranza; Attendance: 0 Referee: Jesús Gil Manzano

7 February 2021 22	Real Sociedad	4–1	Cádiz	San Sebastián
14:00 CET (UTC+1)	Oyarzabal 26' (pen.), 34'; Isak 54', 59'	Report	Jairo (yellow card) 38', (goal) 65'; Marcos Mauro (red card) 45+3'; Sobrino (yellow card) 89'	Stadium: Anoeta; Attendance: 0 Referee: Valentín Pizarro Gómez

15 February 2021 23	Cádiz	0–4	Athletic Bilbao	Cádiz
21:00 CET (UTC+1)	Cala (yellow card) 33'; Fali (yellow card) 47'; Šaponjić (yellow card) 90+1'	Report	Berenguer 4', 29'; López 15'; Núñez (yellow card) 19'; Williams 52'; Vesga (yellow card) 70'	Stadium: Ramón de Carranza; Attendance: 0 Referee: Alejandro Hernández Hernández

21 February 2021 24	Barcelona	1–1	Cádiz	Barcelona
14:00 CET (UTC+1)	Messi 32' (pen.)	Report	Alejo (yellow card) 82'; José Mari (yellow card) 85'; Álex 89' (pen.)	Stadium: Camp Nou; Attendance: 0 Referee: Juan Martínez Munuera

28 February 2021 25	Cádiz	0–1	Real Betis	Cádiz
16:15 CET (UTC+1)	Espino (yellow card) 80'	Report	Lainez (yellow card) 57'; Juanmi (yellow card) 61', (goal) 84'	Stadium: Ramón de Carranza; Attendance: 0 Referee: Antonio Mateu Lahoz

6 March 2021 26	Cádiz	1–0	Eibar	Cádiz
18:30 CET (UTC+1)	Negredo 40'; José Mari (yellow card) 51'; Jairo (yellow card) 90+7'	Report	Enrich (yellow card) 17'; José Ángel (yellow card) 34'; Dmitrović (penalty missed) 57'	Stadium: Ramón de Carranza; Attendance: 0 Referee: Carlos del Cerro Grande

13 March 2021 27	Alavés	1–1	Cádiz	Vitoria-Gasteiz
14:00 CET (UTC+1)	Joselu 36' (pen.); Pina (yellow card) 70'; García (yellow card) 80' (yellow-red card) 81'	Report	Salvi (yellow card) 34'; Fali (yellow card) 74'; Álex 84' (pen.); Šaponjić (yellow card) 90+2'	Stadium: Mendizorrotza; Attendance: 0 Referee: Isidro Díaz de Mera Escuderos

21 March 2021 28	Villarreal	2–1	Cádiz	Villarreal
16:15 CET (UTC+1)	Gerard 5' (pen.); Foyth (yellow card) 35'; Trigueros (yellow card) 60'; Bacca 67'; Albiol (yellow card) 90+4'	Report	Jønsson (yellow card) 4'; Cala (yellow card) 15'; Álex 69'; Fali (yellow card) 90+4'	Stadium: Estadio de la Cerámica; Attendance: 0 Referee: César Soto Grado

4 April 2021 29	Cádiz	2–1	Valencia	Cádiz
18:30 CEST (UTC+2)	Cala 14', (yellow card) 26'; Salvi (yellow card) 23'; Marcos Mauro 88'	Report	Gameiro 19'; Diakhaby (yellow card) 30'; Gabriel (yellow card) 49'	Stadium: Ramón de Carranza; Attendance: 0 Referee: David Medié Jiménez

10 April 2021 30	Getafe	0–1	Cádiz	Getafe
14:00 CEST (UTC+2)	Mata (yellow card) 11'; Arambarri (yellow card) 62'; Josete (yellow card) 84'	Report	Timor 64' (o.g.); José Mari (yellow card) 69'; Jønsson (yellow card) 73'	Stadium: Coliseum Alfonso Pérez; Attendance: 0 Referee: Ricardo de Burgos Bengoetxea

18 April 2021 33	Cádiz	0–0	Celta Vigo	Cádiz
18:30 CEST (UTC+2)		Report	Murillo (yellow card) 29'	Stadium: Ramón de Carranza; Attendance: 0 Referee: Pablo González Fuertes
Note: The match was originally scheduled for 28 April 2021, but was brought forward by La Liga.

21 April 2021 31	Cádiz	0–3	Real Madrid	Cádiz
22:00 CEST (UTC+2)	Salvi (yellow card) 8'; Iza (yellow card) 29'; José Mari (yellow card) 41'; Jønsson (yellow card) 41'; Akapo (yellow card) 90+2'	Report	Varane (yellow card) 22'; Benzema 30' (pen.), 40'; Odriozola 33'; Nacho (yellow card) 46'; Marcelo (yellow card) 68'	Stadium: Ramón de Carranza; Attendance: 0 Referee: Antonio Mateu Lahoz

24 April 2021 32	Valladolid	1–1	Cádiz	Valladolid
16:15 CEST (UTC+2)	Plano 14'; Alcaraz (yellow card) 81'	Report	Espino (yellow card) 27'; Fali (yellow card) 60'; Cala 64'; Alejo (yellow card) 83'	Stadium: José Zorrilla; Attendance: 0 Referee: Javier Alberola Rojas

2 May 2021 34	Granada	0–1	Cádiz	Granada
18:30 CEST (UTC+2)	Suárez (yellow card) 66'; Gonalons (yellow card) 72'; Quini (yellow card) 77'; Soldado (yellow card) 87' (yellow-red card) 87'; Montoro (yellow card) 88'; Aarón (yellow card) 90+3'	Report	Sobrino 39', (yellow card) 75'; Negredo (yellow card) 74'	Stadium: Nuevo Los Cármenes; Attendance: 0 Referee: Isidro Díaz de Mera Escuderos

8 May 2021 35	Cádiz	2–1	Huesca	Cádiz
18:30 CEST (UTC+2)	Marcos Mauro 43'; Silva 45+2' (o.g.); José Mari (yellow card) 49'; Jønsson (yellow card) 61'; Carcelén (yellow card) 79'; Fali (yellow card) 90+1'	Report	Mir 45+1'	Stadium: Ramón de Carranza; Attendance: 0 Referee: Alejandro Hernández Hernández

11 May 2021 36	Osasuna	3–2	Cádiz	Pamplona
19:00 CEST (UTC+2)	Budimir 38', 75'; D. García (yellow card) 47'; Vidal (yellow card) 66'; Torres 86' (pen.)	Report	Espino (yellow card) 27'; Šaponjić 49' (pen.); Iza (yellow card) 86'; Perea 90+1'	Stadium: El Sadar; Attendance: 0 Referee: Santiago Jaime Latre

16 May 2021 37	Cádiz	1–3	Elche	Cádiz
18:30 CEST (UTC+2)	José Mari 15' (pen.); Alejo (yellow card) 66'; Lozano (yellow card) 90+1'; Fali (yellow card) 90+3'	Report	Gonzalo (yellow card) 15'; Josan (yellow card) 53'; Milla 58'; González 64', (yellow card) 76'; Fidel (yellow card) 73', (goal) 88'	Stadium: Ramón de Carranza; Attendance: 0 Referee: César Soto Grado

21 May 2021 38	Levante	2–2	Cádiz	Valencia
21:00 CEST (UTC+2)	Roger 8'; Melero 58'	Report	Negredo 14', (yellow card) 25'; Akapo 32'; Sobrino (yellow card) 41'	Stadium: Ciutat de València; Attendance: 0 Referee: Xavier Estrada Fernández

=== Copa del Rey ===
17 December 2020 First round	Ribadumia	0–2	Cádiz	Ribadumia
19:00 CET (UTC+1)	Iglesias (yellow card) 33'; Padín (yellow card) 54'; Domingo (yellow card) 59'; Martinez (yellow card) 81'	Report	Garrido 33'; Malbašić 52'	Stadium: Novo a Senra; Referee: Pablo González Fuertes

7 January 2021 Second round	Pontevedra	0–0 (a.e.t.) (4–5 p)	Cádiz	Pontevedra
19:00 CET (UTC+1)	Zabaleta (yellow card) 77'; Campos (yellow card) 114'	Report	Erimuya (yellow card) 119'	Stadium: Pasarón; Referee: César Soto Grado
	Penalties
	Campos (penalty scored); Rufo (penalty scored); Calvillo (penalty scored); González (penalty scored); Vázquez (penalty missed)		(penalty scored) Malbašić; (penalty scored) Pombo; (penalty scored) Lozano; (penalty scored) Akapo; (penalty scored) Adekanye

16 January 2021 Round of 32	Girona	2–0	Cádiz	Girona
16:00 CET (UTC+1)	Valery 48', 58'; Kebe (yellow card) 82'; Stuani (yellow card) 84'	Report	Erimuya (yellow card) 26'	Stadium: Montilivi; Referee: Valentín Pizarro Gómez

== Statistics ==
=== Appearances and goals ===
Last updated on the end of the season.

No.	Pos	Nat	Player	Total		La Liga		Copa del Rey	
No.	Pos	Nat	Player	Apps	Goals	Apps	Goals	Apps	Goals
Goalkeepers
1	GK	(Argentina) ARG	Jeremías Ledesma	32	0	32	0	0	0
13	GK	(Spain) ESP	David Gil	7	0	4	0	3	0
26	GK	(Argentina) ARG	Juan Flere	0	0	0	0	0	0
Defenders
3	DF	(Spain) ESP	Fali	35	0	29+5	0	1	0
4	DF	(Argentina) ARG	Marcos Mauro	24	2	22+2	2	0	0
15	DF	(Equatorial Guinea) GEQ	Carlos Akapo	16	1	10+3	1	3	0
16	DF	(Spain) ESP	Cala	29	3	26+2	3	1	0
19	DF	(Spain) ESP	Pedro Alcalá	14	0	8+5	0	1	0
20	DF	(Spain) ESP	Isaac Carcelén	33	0	31+1	0	0+1	0
22	DF	(Uruguay) URU	Espino	32	0	31+1	0	0	0
27	DF	(Spain) ESP	Marc Baró	4	0	1	0	3	0
28	DF	(Nigeria) NGR	Saturday Erimuya	2	0	0	0	2	0
34	DF	(Senegal) SEN	Momo Mbaye	1	0	0	0	1	0
37	DF	(Spain) ESP	Álex Martín	2	0	1+1	0	0	0
Midfielders
2	MF	(Denmark) DEN	Jens Jønsson	37	0	33+2	0	0+2	0
5	MF	(Spain) ESP	Jon Ander Garrido	26	1	7+16	0	3	1
6	MF	(Spain) ESP	José Mari	23	1	18+4	1	1	0
7	MF	(Spain) ESP	Salvi	29	2	25+3	2	1	0
8	MF	(Spain) ESP	Álex Fernández	26	4	21+4	4	0+1	0
10	MF	(Spain) ESP	Alberto Perea	29	2	16+11	2	1+1	0
11	MF	(Spain) ESP	Jorge Pombo	15	1	5+7	1	2+1	0
14	MF	(Spain) ESP	Iván Alejo	24	1	6+16	1	1+1	0
17	MF	(Argentina) ARG	Augusto Fernández	12	0	4+8	0	0	0
25	MF	(Spain) ESP	Jairo Izquierdo	33	1	11+19	1	1+2	0
38	MF	(Spain) ESP	Álvaro Bastida	1	0	0+1	0	0	0
Forwards
9	FW	(Honduras) HON	Anthony Lozano	31	3	18+11	3	1+1	0
12	FW	(Serbia) SRB	Ivan Šaponjić	9	1	3+6	1	0	0
18	FW	(Spain) ESP	Álvaro Negredo	35	8	29+6	8	0	0
21	FW	(Spain) ESP	Rubén Sobrino	16	1	11+5	1	0	0
24	FW	(Serbia) SRB	Filip Malbašić	31	1	8+20	0	1+2	1
33	FW	(Spain) ESP	Manuel Nieto	2	0	0+2	0	0	0
Players who have made an appearance or had a squad number this season but have left the club
1	GK	(Spain) ESP	Alberto Cifuentes	0	0	0	0	0	0
12	MF	(France) FRA	Yann Bodiger	12	0	2+7	0	3	0
17	MF	(Spain) ESP	Edu Ramos	0	0	0	0	0	0
19	DF	(Peru) PER	Jean-Pierre Rhyner	0	0	0	0	0	0
21	FW	(Spain) ESP	Álvaro Giménez	14	2	3+8	2	2+1	0
23	DF	(Spain) ESP	Sergio González	2	0	1	0	0+1	0
23	FW	(Spain) ESP	Nano	2	0	0+1	0	0+1	0

=== Goalscorers ===
As of 14 December 2020

Rank	No.	Pos	Nat	Name	La Liga	Copa del Rey	Total
1	18	FW	(Spain)	Álvaro Negredo	3	0	3
2	7	MF	(Spain)	Salvi	2	0	2
2	21	FW	(Spain)	Álvaro Giménez	2	0	2
4	11	MF	(Spain)	Jorge Pombo	1	0	1
4	14	MF	(Spain)	Iván Alejo	1	0	1
4	9	FW	(Honduras)	Anthony Lozano	1	0	1
Own goal					1	0	1
Totals					11	0	11
