= List of Spanish football transfers summer 2021 =

This is a list of Spanish football transfers for the summer sale prior to the 2021–22 season of La Liga. Only moves from La Liga are listed.

The summer transfer window will begin on 1 July 2021, although a few transfers were announced prior to that date, the transferred players will not officially become part of their new club until the window's opening. The window will close at midnight on 2 September 2021. Players without a club can join one at any time, either during or in between transfer windows. Clubs below La Liga level can also sign players on loan at any time. If needed, clubs can sign a goalkeeper on an emergency loan, if all others are unavailable.

== Alavés ==
Manager: (Spain) Javier Calleja (2nd season)

=== In ===
Date	Player	From	Type	Fee	Ref
30 June 2021	(Spain) Saúl García	Sporting Gijón	Loan return		
30 June 2021	(Spain) Carlos Isaac	Albacete	Loan return		
30 June 2021	(Spain) Javi Muñoz	Mirandés	Loan return		
30 June 2021	(Spain) Rafa Navarro	(Croatia) Istra 1961	Loan return		
30 June 2021	(Cameroon) Fabrice Ondoa	(Croatia) Istra 1961	Loan return		
30 June 2021	(Panama) José Luis Rodríguez	Lugo	Loan return		
1 July 2021	(Spain) Toni Moya	Atlético Madrid B	Transfer	Free	
8 July 2021	(Japan) Taichi Hara	(Croatia) Istra 1961	Transfer	Undisclosed	
9 July 2021	(Spain) Manu García	Sporting Gijón	Loan		
10 July 2021	(Spain) Iván Martín	Villarreal	Loan		
22 July 2021	(France) Florian Lejeune	(England) Newcastle United	Transfer	Undisclosed	
23 July 2021	(Senegal) Mamadou Loum	(Portugal) Porto	Loan		
5 August 2021	(Uruguay) Facundo Pellistri	(England) Manchester United	Loan		
20 August 2021	(United States) Matt Miazga	(England) Chelsea	Loan		
20 August 2021	(Senegal) Mamadou Sylla	Girona	Transfer	Undisclosed	
23 August 2021	(Spain) Miguel de la Fuente	Real Valladolid	Transfer	Undisclosed	

=== Out ===
Date	Player	To	Type	Fee	Ref
30 June 2021	(Argentina) Rodrigo Battaglia	(Portugal) Sporting CP	Loan return		
30 June 2021	(Spain) Iñigo Córdoba	Athletic Bilbao	Loan return		
30 June 2021	(Brazil) Deyverson	(Brazil) Palmeiras	Loan return		
30 June 2021	(Spain) Manu García	Unattached	Transfer	Free	
30 June 2021	(France) Florian Lejeune	(England) Newcastle United	Loan return		
30 June 2021	(Uruguay) Facundo Pellistri	(England) Manchester United	Loan return		
1 July 2021	(Argentina) Ramón Miérez	(Croatia) Osijek	Buyout clause	€2.5M	
1 July 2021	(Benin) Olivier Verdon	(Bulgaria) Ludogorets Razgrad	Buyout clause	€1M	
30 July 2021	(Panama) José Luis Rodríguez	Sporting Gijón	Loan		
5 August 2021	(Spain) Borja Sainz	Real Zaragoza	Loan		
18 August 2021	(Mauritania) Abdallahi Mahmoud	(Croatia) Istra 1961	Loan		
23 August 2021	(Japan) Taichi Hara	(Belgium) Sint-Truiden	Loan		
25 August 2021	(Spain) Carlos Isaac	Real Oviedo	Loan		
31 August 2021	(Spain) Pepe Blanco	Released			
31 August 2021	(Spain) Lucas Pérez	Elche	Transfer	Free	

== Athletic Bilbao ==
Manager: (Spain) Marcelino (2nd season)

=== In ===
Date	Player	From	Type	Fee	Ref
30 June 2021	(Spain) Iñigo Córdoba	Alavés	Loan return		
30 June 2021	(Bosnia and Herzegovina) Kenan Kodro	Valladolid	Loan return		
30 June 2021	(Spain) Daniel Vivian	Mirandés	Loan return		
1 July 2021	(Spain) Álex Petxarroman	Real Sociedad B	Transfer	Free	

=== Out ===
Date	Player	To	Type	Fee	Ref
1 July 2021	(Spain) Imanol García de Albéniz	Mirandés	Loan		
1 July 2021	(Spain) Iñigo Vicente	Mirandés	Loan		
16 July 2021	(Spain) Ibai Gómez	Released			
24 August 2021	(Bosnia and Herzegovina) Kenan Kodro	(Hungary) Fehérvár	Transfer	Free	
31 August 2021	(Spain) Iñigo Córdoba	(Netherlands) Go Ahead Eagles	Loan		
31 August 2021	(Spain) Unai López	Rayo Vallecano	Transfer	Undisclosed	

== Atlético Madrid ==
Manager: (Argentina) Diego Simeone (11th season)

=== In ===
Date	Player	From	Type	Fee	Ref
30 June 2021	(Colombia) Santiago Arias	(Germany) Bayer Leverkusen	Loan return		
30 June 2021	(Spain) Diego Conde	Leganés	Loan return		
30 June 2021	(Argentina) Nicolás Ibáñez	(Mexico) Atlético San Luis	Loan return		
30 June 2021	(Spain) Víctor Mollejo	Mallorca	Loan return		
30 June 2021	(Spain) Javi Montero	(Turkey) Beşiktaş	Loan return		
30 June 2021	(Argentina) Nehuén Pérez	Granada	Loan return		
30 June 2021	(Spain) Darío Poveda	Getafe	Loan return		
30 June 2021	(Spain) Rodrigo Riquelme	(England) AFC Bournemouth	Loan return		
30 June 2021	(Spain) Manu Sánchez	Osasuna	Loan return		
30 June 2021	(Serbia) Ivan Šaponjić	Cádiz	Loan return		
30 June 2021	(Argentina) Axel Werner	(Mexico) Atlético San Luis	Loan return		
5 July 2021	(Portugal) Marcos Paulo	(Brazil) Fluminense	Transfer	Free	
12 July 2021	(Argentina) Rodrigo De Paul	(Italy) Udinese	Transfer	Undisclosed	
19 August 2021	(France) Benjamin Lecomte	(France) Monaco	Loan		
25 August 2021	(Brazil) Matheus Cunha	(Germany) Hertha BSC	Transfer	€28M	
1 September 2021	(France) Antoine Griezmann	Barcelona	Loan		

=== Out ===
Date	Player	To	Type	Fee	Ref
30 June 2021	(France) Moussa Dembélé	(France) Lyon	Loan return		
30 June 2021	(Uruguay) Lucas Torreira	(England) Arsenal	Loan return		
1 July 2021	(Argentina) Nicolás Ibáñez	(Mexico) Pachuca	Transfer	Undisclosed	
1 July 2021	(Spain) Álvaro Morata	(Italy) Juventus	Loan		
5 July 2021	(Spain) Vitolo	Getafe	Loan		
19 August 2021	(Croatia) Ivo Grbić	(France) Lille	Loan		
24 August 2021	(Brazil) Marcos Paulo	(Portugal) Famalicão	Loan		
28 August 2021	(Argentina) Nehuén Pérez	(Italy) Udinese	Loan		
30 August 2021	(Colombia) Santiago Arias	Granada	Loan		
31 August 2021	(Spain) Saúl	(England) Chelsea	Loan		

== Barcelona ==
Manager: (Netherlands) Ronald Koeman (2nd season)

=== In ===
Date	Player	From	Type	Fee	Ref
30 June 2021	(France) Jean-Clair Todibo	(France) Nice	Loan return		
30 June 2021	(Senegal) Moussa Wagué	(Greece) PAOK	Loan return		
1 July 2021	(Argentina) Sergio Agüero	(England) Manchester City	Transfer	Free	
1 July 2021	(Brazil) Emerson Royal	Real Betis	Transfer	€9M	
1 July 2021	(Spain) Eric García	(England) Manchester City	Transfer	Free	
1 July 2021	(Netherlands) Memphis Depay	(France) Lyon	Transfer	Free	

=== Out ===
Date	Player	To	Type	Fee	Ref
1 July 2021	(United States) Konrad de la Fuente	(France) Marseille	Transfer	€3M	
1 July 2021	(Spain) Juan Miranda	Real Betis	Buyout clause	Free	
1 July 2021	(France) Jean-Clair Todibo	(France) Nice	Transfer	€8.5M (Note: Fee may eventually rise to €15.5M)	
4 July 2021	(Portugal) Francisco Trincão	(England) Wolverhampton Wanderers	Loan		
6 July 2021	(Spain) Junior Firpo	(England) Leeds United	Transfer	€15M	
10 July 2021	(Spain) Carles Aleñá	Getafe	Transfer	Undisclosed	
10 August 2021	(Argentina) Lionel Messi	(France) Paris Saint-Germain	Transfer	Free	
31 August 2021	(Albania) Rey Manaj	(Italy) Spezia	Loan		
31 August 2021	(Brazil) Emerson Royal	(England) Tottenham Hotspur	Transfer	£25.8M	
1 September 2021	(France) Antoine Griezmann	Atlético Madrid	Loan		

== Cádiz ==
Manager: (Spain) Álvaro Cervera (7th season)

=== In ===
Date	Player	From	Type	Fee	Ref
30 June 2021	(Spain) Álvaro Giménez	Mallorca	Loan return		
30 June 2021	(Spain) Sergio González	Tenerife	Loan return		
30 June 2021	(Spain) Matos	Málaga	Loan return		
30 June 2021	(Spain) Nano Mesa	Logroñés	Loan return		
30 June 2021	(Spain) Gaspar Panadero	Ponferradina	Loan return		
30 June 2021	(Spain) Caye Quintana	Málaga	Loan return		
30 June 2021	(Peru) Jean-Pierre Rhyner	(Netherlands) Emmen	Loan return		
30 June 2021	(Spain) Daniel Sotres	Rayo Majadahonda	Loan return		
1 July 2021	(Chile) Tomás Alarcón	(Chile) O'Higgins	Transfer	€1.8M	
1 July 2021	(Armenia) Varazdat Haroyan	(Kazakhstan) Astana	Transfer	Free	
1 July 2021	(Argentina) Jeremías Ledesma	(Argentina) Rosario Central	Buyout clause	€1.8M	
23 August 2021	(Romania) Florin Andone	(England) Brighton & Hove Albion	Loan		

=== Out ===
Date	Player	To	Type	Fee	Ref
20 May 2021	(Argentina) Augusto Fernández	Retired			
30 June 2021	(Spain) Jairo Izquierdo	Girona	Loan return		
30 June 2021	(Serbia) Ivan Šaponjić	Atlético Madrid	Loan return		
30 June 2021	(Spain) Rubén Sobrino	Valencia	Loan return		
1 July 2021	(Spain) David Mayoral	Lugo	Loan		
1 July 2021	(Spain) Daniel Sotres	Rayo Majadahonda	Transfer	Undisclosed	
4 August 2021	(Spain) Gaspar Panadero	(Azerbaijan) Qarabağ	Transfer	Undisclosed	

== Celta Vigo ==
Manager: (Argentina) Eduardo Coudet (2nd season)

=== In ===
Date	Player	From	Type	Fee	Ref
30 June 2021	(Uruguay) Gabriel Fernández	Zaragoza	Loan return		
30 June 2021	(Spain) Juan Hernández	Sabadell	Loan return		
30 June 2021	(Turkey) Okay Yokuşlu	(England) West Bromwich Albion	Loan return		
5 July 2021	(Argentina) Franco Cervi	(Portugal) Benfica	Transfer	Undisclosed	
8 July 2021	(Argentina) Matías Dituro	(Chile) Universidad Católica	Loan		
31 August 2021	(Colombia) Jeison Murillo	(Italy) Sampdoria	Loan		

=== Out ===
Date	Player	To	Type	Fee	Ref
20 May 2021	(Spain) Sergio Álvarez	Retired			
30 June 2021	(Spain) Aarón Martín	(Germany) Mainz 05	Loan return		
30 June 2021	(Colombia) Jeison Murillo	(Italy) Sampdoria	Loan return		
30 June 2021	(Spain) Jorge Sáenz	Valencia	Loan return		
1 July 2021	(Spain) Jozabed	Málaga	Buyout clause	Free	
1 July 2021	(Spain) Álvaro Vadillo	Espanyol	Buyout clause	€1.8M	

== Elche ==
Manager: (Spain) Fran Escribá (2nd season)

=== In ===
Date	Player	From	Type	Fee	Ref
30 June 2021	(Spain) Ramón Folch	Tenerife	Loan return		
1 July 2021	(Argentina) Lucas Boyé	(Italy) Torino	Buyout clause	€2M	
1 July 2021	(Argentina) Iván Marcone	(Argentina) Boca Juniors	Buyout clause	€3.8M	
7 July 2021	(Spain) Pedro Bigas	Eibar	Transfer	Undisclosed	
9 July 2021	(Chile) Enzo Roco	(Turkey) Fatih Karagümrük	Transfer	Undisclosed	
12 July 2021	(Spain) Kiko Casilla	(England) Leeds United	Loan		
20 August 2021	(Argentina) Darío Benedetto	(France) Marseille	Loan		
31 August 2021	(Spain) Lucas Pérez	Alavés	Transfer	Free	

=== Out ===
Date	Player	To	Type	Fee	Ref
9 June 2021	(Spain) Nino	Retired			
30 June 2021	(Argentina) Paulo Gazzaniga	(England) Tottenham Hotspur	Loan return		
30 June 2021	(Colombia) Johan Mojica	Girona	Loan return		
30 June 2021	(Argentina) Emiliano Rigoni	(Russia) Zenit Saint Petersburg	Loan return		

== Espanyol ==
Manager: (Spain) Vicente Moreno (2nd season)

=== In ===
Date	Player	From	Type	Fee	Ref
30 June 2021	(Spain) Víctor Gómez	Mirandés	Loan return		
30 June 2021	(Morocco) Moha	Mirandés	Loan return		
1 July 2021	(Belgium) Landry Dimata	(Belgium) Anderlecht	Buyout clause	€2.2M	
1 July 2021	(Spain) Miguelón	Villarreal	Buyout clause	€500K	
1 July 2021	(Spain) Álvaro Vadillo	Celta Vigo	Buyout clause	€1.8M	
31 August 2021	(Venezuela) Yangel Herrera	(England) Manchester City	Loan		

=== Out ===
Date	Player	To	Type	Fee	Ref
28 July 2021	(Spain) Álvaro Martí	(Italy) Lecce	Transfer	Undisclosed	

== Getafe ==
Manager: (Spain) Míchel (1st season)

=== In ===
Date	Player	From	Type	Fee	Ref
30 June 2021	(Spain) Hugo Duro	Real Madrid Castilla	Loan return		
30 June 2021	(Scotland) Jack Harper	Villarreal B	Loan return		
30 June 2021	(Spain) Ignasi Miquel	Leganés	Loan return		
5 July 2021	(Mexico) José Juan Macías	(Mexico) Guadalajara	Loan		
5 July 2021	(Spain) Vitolo	Atlético Madrid	Loan		
6 July 2021	(Serbia) Stefan Mitrović	(France) Strasbourg	Transfer	Undisclosed	
10 July 2021	(Spain) Carles Aleñá	Barcelona	Transfer	Undisclosed	
20 August 2021	(Czech Republic) Jakub Jankto	(Italy) Sampdoria	Transfer	Undisclosed	
31 August 2021	(Portugal) Florentino	(Portugal) Benfica	Loan		

=== Out ===
Date	Player	To	Type	Fee	Ref
30 June 2021	(Spain) Carles Aleñá	Barcelona	Loan return		
30 June 2021	(Morocco) Sofian Chakla	Villarreal	Loan return		
30 June 2021	(Colombia) Cucho Hernández	(England) Watford	Loan return		
30 June 2021	(Japan) Takefusa Kubo	Real Madrid	Loan return		
30 June 2021	(Senegal) Amath Ndiaye	Mallorca	Transfer	Undisclosed	
30 June 2021	(Spain) Darío Poveda	Atlético Madrid	Loan return		
2 July 2021	(Spain) Ángel Rodríguez	Mallorca	Transfer	Free	
31 August 2021	(Spain) Marc Cucurella	(England) Brighton & Hove Albion	Transfer	£15.4M	

== Granada ==
Manager: (Spain) Robert Moreno (1st season)

=== In ===
Date	Player	From	Type	Fee	Ref
30 June 2021	(Spain) Antoñín	Rayo Vallecano	Loan return		
30 June 2021	(Nigeria) Ramon Azeez	Cartagena	Loan return		
13 July 2021	(Colombia) Carlos Bacca	Villarreal	Transfer	Free	
30 August 2021	(Colombia) Santiago Arias	Atlético Madrid	Loan		

=== Out ===
Date	Player	To	Type	Fee	Ref
30 June 2021	(Venezuela) Yangel Herrera	(England) Manchester City	Loan return		
30 June 2021	(Brazil) Kenedy	(England) Chelsea	Loan return		
30 June 2021	(Argentina) Nehuén Pérez	Atlético Madrid	Loan return		
30 June 2021	(Portugal) Domingos Quina	(England) Watford	Loan return		
30 June 2021	(Spain) Jesús Vallejo	Real Madrid	Loan return		
1 July 2021	(Portugal) Rui Silva	Real Betis	Transfer	Free	
1 July 2021	(Spain) Roberto Soldado	Levante	Transfer	€500k	
30 August 2021	(Spain) Adrián Marín	(Portugal) Famalicão	Loan		

== Levante ==
Manager: (Spain) Paco López (5th season)

=== In ===
Date	Player	From	Type	Fee	Ref
30 June 2021	(Portugal) Hernâni	(Saudi Arabia) Al Wehda	Loan return		
30 June 2021	(Spain) Pablo Martínez	Mirandés	Loan return		
30 June 2021	(Spain) Arturo Molina	Castellón	Loan return		
30 June 2021	(Spain) Pepelu	(Portugal) Vitória Guimarães	Loan return		
30 June 2021	(Spain) Koke Vegas	Mallorca	Loan return		
1 July 2021	(Spain) Roberto Soldado	Granada	Transfer	Free	
2 July 2021	(Spain) Enric Franquesa	Villarreal	Transfer	Undisclosed	

=== Out ===
Date	Player	To	Type	Fee	Ref

== Mallorca ==
Manager: (Spain) Luis García (2nd season)

=== In ===
Date	Player	From	Type	Fee	Ref
30 June 2021	(Spain) Álex Alegría	Zaragoza	Loan return		
30 June 2021	(Spain) Josep Señé	Castellón	Loan return		
30 June 2021	(Senegal) Amath Ndiaye	Getafe	Transfer	Undisclosed	
30 June 2021	(Spain) Stoichkov	Sabadell	Loan return		
30 June 2021	(Spain) Pablo Valcarce	Ponferradina	Loan return		
30 June 2021	(Serbia) Igor Zlatanović	Castellón	Loan return		
2 July 2021	(Spain) Ángel Rodríguez	Getafe	Transfer	Free	
6 July 2021	(Slovakia) Dominik Greif	(Slovakia) Slovan Bratislava	Transfer	Undisclosed	
7 July 2021	(Spain) Jaume Costa	Villarreal	Transfer	Free	
7 July 2021	(Spain) Pablo Maffeo	(Germany) VfB Stuttgart	Loan		

=== Out ===
Date	Player	To	Type	Fee	Ref
30 June 2021	(Spain) Marc Cardona	Osasuna	Loan return		
30 June 2021	(Spain) Álvaro Giménez	Cádiz	Loan return		
30 June 2021	(Spain) Víctor Mollejo	Atlético Madrid	Loan return		
30 June 2021	(Brazil) Murilo	(Portugal) Braga	Loan return		
30 June 2021	(Spain) Koke Vegas	Levante	Loan return		
1 July 2021	(Croatia) Ante Budimir	Osasuna	Buyout clause	€8M	
1 July 2021	(Spain) Miquel Parera	Racing Santander	Transfer	Free	
19 August 2021	(Argentina) Luka Romero	(Italy) Lazio	Transfer	Undisclosed	

== Osasuna ==
Manager: (Spain) Jagoba Arrasate (4th season)

=== In ===
Date	Player	From	Type	Fee	Ref
30 June 2021	(Spain) Iván Barbero	Alcorcón	Loan return		
30 June 2021	(Spain) Brandon	Leganés	Loan return		
30 June 2021	(Spain) Marc Cardona	Mallorca	Loan return		
30 June 2021	(Spain) Jaume Grau	(Portugal) Tondela	Loan return		
30 June 2021	(Spain) Robert Ibáñez	Leganés	Loan return		
1 July 2021	(Croatia) Ante Budimir	Mallorca	Buyout clause	€8M	
1 July 2021	(Spain) Kike	Eibar	Transfer	Free	
5 July 2021	(Spain) Cote	Eibar	Transfer	Free	
5 July 2021	(Angola) Jonás Ramalho	Girona	Transfer	€700k	

=== Out ===
Date	Player	To	Type	Fee	Ref
30 June 2021	(Argentina) Jonathan Calleri	(Uruguay) Deportivo Maldonado	Loan return		
30 June 2021	(Spain) Jony	(Italy) Lazio	Loan return		
30 June 2021	(Angola) Jonás Ramalho	Girona	Loan return		
30 June 2021	(Spain) Manu Sánchez	Atlético Madrid	Loan return		
1 July 2021	(Spain) Iván Martínez	Castellón	Loan		
1 July 2021	(Spain) Rubén Martínez	(Cyprus) AEK Larnaca	Transfer	Free	
15 July 2021	(Spain) Jorge Herrando	Logroñés	Loan		
30 July 2021	(Spain) Marc Cardona	(Netherlands) Go Ahead Eagles	Loan		

== Rayo Vallecano ==
Manager: (Spain) Andoni Iraola (2nd season)

=== In ===
Date	Player	From	Type	Fee	Ref
30 June 2021	(Spain) Sergio Moreno	Mirandés	Loan return		
13 July 2021	(Spain) Fran García	Real Madrid Castilla	Transfer	Undisclosed	
14 July 2021	(Albania) Iván Balliu	Almería	Transfer	Free	
31 August 2021	(Spain) Unai López	Athletic Bilbao	Transfer	Undisclosed	

=== Out ===
Date	Player	To	Type	Fee	Ref
30 June 2021	(Spain) Antoñín	Granada	Loan return		
30 June 2021	(Spain) Fran García	Real Madrid Castilla	Loan return		
30 June 2021	(Spain) Iván Martos	Almería	Loan return		

== Real Betis ==
Manager: (Chile) Manuel Pellegrini (2nd season)

=== In ===
Date	Player	From	Type	Fee	Ref
30 June 2021	(Spain) Edgar González	Oviedo	Loan return		
30 June 2021	(Spain) Rober	Las Palmas	Loan return		
1 July 2021	(Spain) Juan Miranda	Barcelona	Buyout clause	Free	
1 July 2021	(Senegal) Youssouf Sabaly	(France) Bordeaux	Transfer	Free	
1 July 2021	(Portugal) Rui Silva	Granada	Transfer	Free	
1 July 2021	(Spain) Marc Vidal	Villarreal B	Transfer	Undisclosed	
19 August 2021	(Argentina) Germán Pezzella	(Italy) Fiorentina	Transfer	Undisclosed	
31 August 2021	(Spain) Héctor Bellerín	(England) Arsenal	Loan		

=== Out ===
Date	Player	To	Type	Fee	Ref
1 July 2021	(Brazil) Emerson Royal	Barcelona	Transfer	€9M	
1 July 2021	(Algeria) Aïssa Mandi	Villarreal	Transfer	Free	

== Real Madrid ==
Manager: (Italy) Carlo Ancelotti (1st season)

=== In ===
Date	Player	From	Type	Fee	Ref
30 June 2021	(Wales) Gareth Bale	(England) Tottenham Hotspur	Loan return		
30 June 2021	(Spain) Dani Ceballos	(England) Arsenal	Loan return		
30 June 2021	(Spain) Brahim Díaz	(Italy) Milan	Loan return		
30 June 2021	(Serbia) Luka Jović	(Germany) Eintracht Frankfurt	Loan return		
30 June 2021	(Japan) Takefusa Kubo	Getafe	Loan return		
30 June 2021	(Norway) Martin Ødegaard	(England) Arsenal	Loan return		
30 June 2021	(Spain) Jesús Vallejo	Granada	Loan return		
1 July 2021	(Austria) David Alaba	(Germany) Bayern Munich	Transfer	Free	
31 August 2021	(France) Eduardo Camavinga	(France) Rennes	Transfer	Undisclosed	

=== Out ===
Date	Player	To	Type	Fee	Ref
8 July 2021	(Spain) Sergio Ramos	(France) Paris Saint-Germain	Transfer	Free	
14 August 2021	(France) Raphaël Varane	(England) Manchester United	Transfer	£34M	
20 August 2021	(Norway) Martin Ødegaard	(England) Arsenal	Transfer	£30M	
28 August 2021	(Spain) Álvaro Odriozola	(Italy) Fiorentina	Loan		

== Real Sociedad ==
Manager: (Spain) Imanol Alguacil (4th season)

=== In ===
Date	Player	From	Type	Fee	Ref
30 June 2021	(France) Naïs Djouahra	Mirandés	Loan return		
30 June 2021	(Brazil) Willian José	(England) Wolverhampton Wanderers	Loan return		
30 June 2021	(Portugal) Kévin Rodrigues	Eibar	Loan return		
30 June 2021	(Slovakia) Peter Pokorný	(Austria) Red Bull Salzburg	Transfer	Undisclosed	
30 June 2021	(Spain) Andoni Zubiaurre	Cultural Leonesa	Loan return		
12 July 2021	(Australia) Mathew Ryan	(England) Brighton & Hove Albion	Transfer	Undisclosed	
26 July 2021	(Spain) Diego Rico	(England) Bournemouth	Transfer	Undisclosed	

=== Out ===
Date	Player	To	Type	Fee	Ref
2 July 2021	(Spain) Waldo Rubio	(Belgium) Cercle Brugge	Loan		
8 August 2021	(Portugal) Kévin Rodrigues	Rayo Vallecano	Loan		
10 August 2021	(Spain) Martín Merquelanz	Rayo Vallecano	Loan		
26 August 2021	(Spain) Jon Bautista	Leganés	Loan		
26 August 2021	(Brazil) Willian José	Leganés	Loan		
31 August 2021	(France) Modibo Sagnan	(Portugal) Tondela	Loan		

== Sevilla ==
Manager: (Spain) Julen Lopetegui (3rd season)

=== In ===
Date	Player	From	Type	Fee	Ref
30 June 2021	(France) Ibrahim Amadou	(France) Angers	Loan return		
30 June 2021	(Brazil) Guilherme Arana	(Brazil) Atlético Mineiro	Loan return		
30 June 2021	(Spain) Juan Berrocal	Mirandés	Loan return		
30 June 2021	(Spain) Bryan Gil	Eibar	Loan return		
30 June 2021	(Morocco) Oussama Idrissi	(Netherlands) Ajax	Loan return		
30 June 2021	(Spain) José Alonso Lara	Deportivo La Coruña	Loan return		
30 June 2021	(Portugal) Rony Lopes	(France) Nice	Loan return		
30 June 2021	(Spain) Alejandro Pozo	Eibar	Loan return		
30 June 2021	(Spain) Juan Soriano	Málaga	Loan return		
4 July 2021	(Serbia) Marko Dmitrović	EIbar	Transfer	Free	
26 July 2021	(Argentina) Erik Lamela	(England) Tottenham Hotspur	Transfer	Free	
20 August 2021	(Spain) Rafa Mir	(England) Wolverhampton Wanderers	Transfer	£13M	

=== Out ===
Date	Player	To	Type	Fee	Ref
1 July 2021	(Spain) Juan Soriano	Tenerife	Transfer	Free	
26 July 2021	(Spain) Bryan Gil	(England) Tottenham Hotspur	Transfer	Undisclosed	

== Valencia ==
Manager: (Spain) José Bordalás (1st season)

=== In ===
Date	Player	From	Type	Fee	Ref
30 June 2021	(Spain) Javi Jiménez	Albacete	Loan return		
30 June 2021	(Spain) Jorge Sáenz	Celta Vigo	Loan return		
30 June 2021	(Spain) Rubén Sobrino	Cádiz	Loan return		
12 July 2021	(Paraguay) Omar Alderete	(Germany) Hertha BSC	Loan		
31 August 2021	(Portugal) Hélder Costa	(England) Leeds United	Loan		

=== Out ===
Date	Player	To	Type	Fee	Ref
30 June 2021	(Italy) Patrick Cutrone	(England) Wolverhampton Wanderers	Loan return		
30 June 2021	(Portugal) Ferro	(Portugal) Benfica	Loan return		
30 June 2021	(Uruguay) Christian Oliva	(Italy) Cagliari	Loan return		
28 July 2021	(Spain) Jorge Sáenz	(Portugal) Marítimo	Loan		

== Villarreal ==
Manager: (Spain) Unai Emery (2nd season)

=== In ===
Date	Player	From	Type	Fee	Ref
30 June 2021	(Morocco) Sofian Chakla	Getafe	Loan return		
30 June 2021	(Spain) Jorge Cuenca	Almería	Loan return		
30 June 2021	(Spain) Enric Franquesa	Girona	Loan return		
30 June 2021	(Spain) Miguel Ángel Leal	(Netherlands) Groningen	Loan return		
30 June 2021	(Spain) Mario González	(Portugal) Tondela	Loan return		
30 June 2021	(Spain) Iván Martín	Mirandés	Loan return		
30 June 2021	(Spain) Manu Morlanes	Almería	Loan return		
30 June 2021	(Spain) Javier Ontiveros	Huesca	Loan return		
30 June 2021	(Spain) Xavi Quintillà	(England) Norwich City	Loan return		
1 July 2021	(Argentina) Juan Foyth	(England) Tottenham Hotspur	Buyout clause	€15M	
1 July 2021	(Algeria) Aïssa Mandi	Real Betis	Transfer	Free	
7 July 2021	(Spain) Manu Morlanes	Almería	Transfer	Undisclosed	
13 July 2021	(Senegal) Boulaye Dia	(France) Stade Reims	Transfer	Undisclosed	
19 August 2021	(Netherlands) Arnaut Danjuma	(England) Bournemouth	Transfer	Undisclosed	

=== Out ===
Date	Player	To	Type	Fee	Ref
1 July 2021	(Spain) Miguelón	Espanyol	Buyout clause	€500K	
2 July 2021	(Spain) Enric Franquesa	Levante	Transfer	Undisclosed	
7 July 2021	(Spain) Jaume Costa	Mallorca	Transfer	Free	
7 July 2021	(Spain) Manu Morlanes	Almería	Transfer	Undisclosed	
10 July 2021	(Spain) Iván Martín	Alavés	Loan		
13 July 2021	(Colombia) Carlos Bacca	Granada	Transfer	Free	
13 August 2021	(Spain) Álex Millán	(Belgium) Cercle Brugge	Loan		
27 August 2021	(Morocco) Sofian Chakla	(Belgium) OH Leuven	Transfer	Free	
