= Cala (footballer, born 1989) =

Spanish footballer

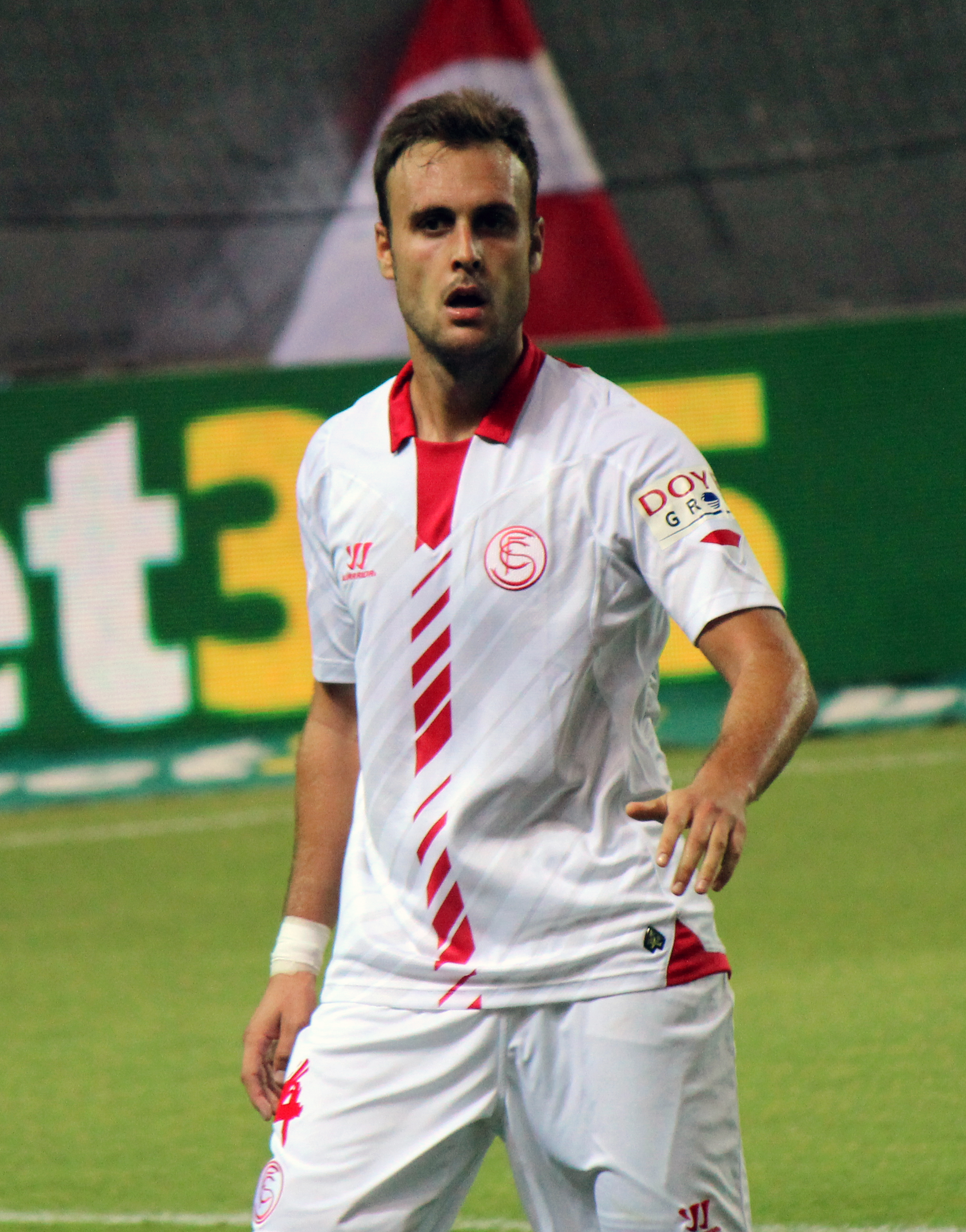
- Cala playing for Sevilla in 2013

Personal information
- Full name: Juan Torres Ruiz
- Date of birth: 26 November 1989 (age 36)
- Place of birth: Lebrija, Spain
- Height: 1.85 m (6 ft 1 in)
- Position: Centre-back

Team information
- Current team: Sanluqueño (president)

Youth career
- Antoniano
- 2000–2008: Sevilla

Senior career*
Years	Team	Apps	(Gls)
2008–2010	Sevilla B	34	(1)
2010–2014	Sevilla	32	(5)
2010–2011	→ Cartagena (loan)	25	(3)
2011–2012	→ AEK Athens (loan)	13	(1)
2014	Cardiff City	8	(2)
2015	Granada	7	(0)
2015–2018	Getafe	70	(5)
2018	Henan Jianye	11	(0)
2018–2019	Las Palmas	30	(1)
2019–2023	Cádiz	72	(5)
Total		302	(23)

International career
2008	Spain U19	1	(0)
- * Club domestic league appearances and goals

Juan Torres Ruiz (Spanish pronunciation: [ˈxwan ˈtores ˈrwiθ]; born 26 November 1989), commonly known as Cala [ˈkala], is a Spanish former professional footballer who played as a central defender.

== Club career ==
=== Sevilla ===
Born in Lebrija, Seville, Andalusia, Cala finished his development at local giants Sevilla FC, making his professional debut in the 2007–08 season for the reserve squad, Sevilla Atlético, which competed in Segunda División. On 9 December 2009, he made his first official appearance with the first team, playing 90 minutes against Rangers in the UEFA Champions League in a 1–0 group stage home win.

Cala would first appear in La Liga on 7 February 2010, again playing the entire game but now suffering a 2–1 defeat at Real Zaragoza. In a streak that started on 10 April at Málaga CF, he scored in three consecutive matches (two wins and one loss), which was a club record for a defender.

For the 2010–11 campaign, Cala was loaned to FC Cartagena. He was regularly used by the second-tier team during his spell, making his official debut on 11 September in a 5–1 home victory over FC Barcelona B and finding the net in the game.

On 5 July 2011, Cala signed a one-year loan deal with AEK Athens FC, where he reunited with former Sevilla boss – main squad and reserves – Manolo Jiménez, as well as teammate José Carlos. He made 21 competitive appearances during his tenure, scoring on 30 October to conclude a 3–0 home win over Aris Thessaloniki F.C. in the Super League Greece. During a match against Olympiacos F.C. two weeks before, he was involved in an altercation with François Modesto, who pulled his shorts down to reveal his briefs.

Cala was recalled by Sevilla in late January 2012, as a replacement for Juventus FC-bound Martín Cáceres; AEK received €60,000 in compensation. On 21 December 2013, he scored to open a 2–1 win at Villarreal CF, also being sent off when he fouled Jaume Costa for a penalty kick scored by Jérémy Perbet. He added eight complete appearances in the UEFA Europa League, which ended in conquest.

=== Cardiff City ===
On 7 February 2014, Cala signed for Premier League club Cardiff City on a 2 1/2-year deal, after terminating his link with Sevilla. He made his debut for his new team eight days later, playing the full 90 minutes in a 2–1 home loss against Wigan Athletic in the round of 16 of the FA Cup. His maiden appearance in the league took place on the 22nd, but in another defeat at the Cardiff City Stadium, now at the hands of Hull City (0–4).

Cala scored his first goal for the Bluebirds on 15 March 2014, but in a 2–1 loss at Everton. His second came in an away victory over Southampton on 12 April, as he hit from long range for the game's only goal. Fifteen days later he was sent off for the first time in his Cardiff career, during a 4–0 away defeat to Sunderland.

Cala was released from his contract with immediate effect on 3 December 2014, having only made one appearance in the Championship that season. He had previously complained via Twitter for being sent to train with the club's academy.

=== Granada and Getafe ===
After being strongly linked to Getafe CF, Cala signed a six-month contract with Granada CF on 28 January 2015. On 28 May he was deemed surplus to requirements by new manager José Ramón Sandoval, and subsequently left the club.

Cala agreed to a three-year deal with Getafe on 25 June 2015, also in the top flight. The following 4 January, he scored his first Spanish League goal in over two years, equalising in a 2–1 away win against Sporting de Gijón.

On 6 August 2016, Cala signed a season-long loan deal with FC Anzhi Makhachkala with an option of making the move permanent at the end of it. Seven days later he announced his return through Instagram, alleging personal problems; according to the Russian club's press release, he returned to Spain to care for his younger brother who was having health issues.

=== Henan Jianye ===
Even though it had always been his intention to agreeing on terms for a new contract, on 1 March 2018 Cala signed with Henan Jianye F.C. for a reported transfer fee of €1.5 million. He made his debut in the Chinese Super League the following day, playing the entire 4–0 home loss to Tianjin Quanjian FC.

=== Las Palmas and Cádiz ===
On 7 July 2018, Cala joined UD Las Palmas from the Spanish second division. He terminated his two-year contract the following 18 June, and moved to Cádiz CF on a five-year deal on 17 July. He netted twice in 27 matches for the latter in his first season, in a return to the top division after 14 years.

On 4 April 2021, shortly after having opened the scoring at the Estadio Ramón de Carranza, Cala allegedly directed a racial slur at Mouctar Diakhaby, to which the entire Valencia CF squad responded by leaving the pitch in support of their teammate. After being informed by the referee that they would forfeit the game if it was not completed, they later returned to resume the match with the exception of Diakhaby, who urged them to play on without him and was replaced by Hugo Guillamón; Cádiz eventually won 2–1, with the winner being scored by Marcos Mauro, who had come on for Cala at half-time. In a press conference held two days later, Cala strongly denied using any racist language towards Diakhaby, claiming he had simply asked him to "leave me in peace" and that the latter had misheard what the former said as a racial slur. Valencia released a statement shortly afterwards, strongly condemning his response, and the following day the Royal Spanish Football Federation confirmed that the incident was now under formal investigation, while no evidence of racial abuse was found in a separate investigation by the Liga Nacional de Fútbol Profesional.

Cala missed the vast majority of the 2022–23 campaign, due to a serious knee injury. He asked to be unregistered, so that his team could sign another player in his position.

Shortly before completing his retirement at the age of 33, Cala became Atlético Sanluqueño CF's president. He oversaw their promotion to the Primera Federación.

== Personal life ==
Cala took as his nickname the maternal surname of his father, also named Juan, who was prominent in Lebrija's football scene. Together with two uncles, they set up a football school named Cala-Lebrija.

== Career statistics ==
Appearances and goals by club, season and competition
Club	Season	League	League		National Cup		League Cup		Continental		Other		Total	
Club	Season	League	Apps	Goals	Apps	Goals	Apps	Goals	Apps	Goals	Apps	Goals	Apps	Goals
Sevilla B	2007–08	Segunda División	6	0	—		—		—		—		6	0
Sevilla B	2008–09	Segunda División	11	0	—		—		—		—		11	0
Sevilla B	Total		17	0	—		—		—		—		17	0
Sevilla	2009–10	La Liga	5	3	2	0	—		1 (Note: Appearance in UEFA Champions League)	0	—		8	3
Sevilla	2011–12	La Liga	8	1	0	0	—		0	0	—		8	1
Sevilla	2012–13	La Liga	10	0	3	1	—		0	0	—		13	1
Sevilla	2013–14	La Liga	9	1	2	0	—		8 (Note: Appearances in UEFA Europa League)	0	—		19	1
Sevilla	Total		32	5	7	1	—		9	0	—		48	6
Cartagena (loan)	2010–11	Segunda División	25	3	1	0	—		—		—		26	3
AEK Athens (loan)	2011–12	Super League Greece	13	1	2	0	—		6	0	—		21	1
Cardiff City	2013–14	Premier League	7	2	1	0	0	0	—		—		8	2
Cardiff City	2014–15	Championship	1	0	0	0	2	0	—		—		3	0
Cardiff City	Total		8	2	1	0	2	0	—		—		11	2
Granada	2014–15	La Liga	7	0	0	0	—		—		—		7	0
Getafe	2015–16	La Liga	22	1	1	0	—		—		—		23	1
Getafe	2016–17	Segunda División	28	2	1	0	—		—		3 (Note: Appearances in La Liga play-offs)	1	32	3
Getafe	2017–18	La Liga	20	2	2	0	—		—		—		22	2
Getafe	Total		70	5	4	0	—		—		3	1	77	6
Henan Jianye	2018	Chinese Super League	11	0	0	0	—		—		—		11	0
Las Palmas	2018–19	Segunda División	30	1	0	0	—		—		—		30	1
Cádiz	2019–20	Segunda División	27	2	0	0	—		—		—		27	2
Cádiz	2020–21	La Liga	28	3	1	0	—		—		—		29	3
Cádiz	2021–22	La Liga	14	0	2	0	—		—		—		16	0
Cádiz	2022–23	La Liga	3	0	0	0	—		—		—		3	0
Cádiz	Total		72	5	3	0	—		—		—		75	5
Career total			285	22	18	1	2	0	15	0	3	1	323	24

== Honours ==
Sevilla

- Copa del Rey: 2009–10
- UEFA Europa League: 2013–14
