= Fali (footballer, born 1993) =

Spanish footballer

Personal information
- Full name: Rafael Jiménez Jarque
- Date of birth: 12 August 1993 (age 33)
- Place of birth: Valencia, Spain
- Height: 1.86 m (6 ft 1 in)
- Positions: Centre-back; defensive midfielder

Team information
- Current team: Xerez
- Number: 6

Youth career
- Benimarc
- 2003–2009: Villarreal
- 2009–2010: Catarroja
- 2010–2012: Levante

Senior career*
Years	Team	Apps	(Gls)
2011–2013	Levante B	33	(1)
2013–2015	Huracán	66	(3)
2015–2019	Gimnàstic	49	(4)
2016–2018	→ Barcelona B (loan)	72	(1)
2019	→ Cádiz (loan)	4	(0)
2019–2026	Cádiz	169	(1)
2026–	Xerez	5	(0)
- * Club domestic league appearances and goals as of 04:39, 11 November 2026 (UTC)

Rafael Jiménez Jarque (born 12 August 1993), known as Fali, is a Spanish professional footballer who plays as a centre-back or a defensive midfielder for Segunda Federación club Xerez.

== Club career ==
=== Levante and Huracán ===
Born in Valencia, Fali joined Levante UD's youth setup in 2010 at age 17, after starting out at Villarreal CF and Catarroja CF. He made his senior debut with their reserves, spending one season apiece in Segunda División B and Tercera División.

Fali terminated his contract with the Valencians on 16 August 2013, and signed with third-tier club Huracán Valencia CF just hours later. In the 2014–15 campaign he appeared in 42 matches and scored three goals, as the team missed out on promotion in the play-offs.

=== Gimnàstic ===
On 6 July 2015, Fali agreed to a two-year deal with Gimnàstic de Tarragona, newly promoted to Segunda División. He played his first game as a professional on 30 August, coming on as a 46th-minute substitute for Sergio Tejera in a 2–1 away win against CD Tenerife.

Fali scored his first goal in the second division on 19 December 2015, his team's second in a 3–1 home victory over Real Zaragoza. On 7 January of the following year, he was loaned to FC Barcelona Atlètic until June.

On 11 July 2016, Fali's loan was extended until 2018 with a buyout clause. He returned to Nàstic in late January 2018.

=== Cádiz ===
On 10 May 2019, Fali moved to fellow second tier side Cádiz CF on loan until the end of the season, as a replacement for the injured Aleksandar Pantić. On 8 July, he signed a permanent three-year deal.

Fali renewed his contract 10 February 2020, until 2024. He scored once from 30 appearances that season, helping to a return to La Liga after 14 years.

On 20 September 2020, Fali made his debut in the Spanish top flight, playing the second half of the 2–0 away defeat of SD Huesca. He was a regular in the following campaigns, but was left out of the squad in 2025–26 and fired by the club in January 2026 due to discipline problems.

=== Later career ===
Fali remained in Andalusia in the 2026–27 campaign, with the 33-year-old joining Segunda Federación's Xerez CD on a one-year contract.

== Personal life ==
Fali is from a gypsy community; he was married at age 16, and had a child at 17. He worked in a scrapyard.

== Career statistics ==
As of match played 25 May 2024

Appearances and goals by club, season and competition
Club	Season	League			National cup		Total	
Club	Season	Division	Apps	Goals	Apps	Goals	Apps	Goals
Levante B	2012–13	Segunda División B	23	0	—		23	0
Huracán	2013–14	Segunda División B	24	0	1	0	25	0
Huracán	2014–15	Segunda División B	42	3	—		42	3
Huracán	Total		66	3	1	0	67	3
Gimnástic	2015–16	Segunda División	7	1	1	0	8	1
Barcelona B (loan)	2015–16	Segunda División B	16	0	—		16	0
Barcelona B (loan)	2016–17	Segunda División B	36	1	—		36	1
Barcelona B (loan)	2017–18	Segunda División	20	0	—		20	0
Barcelona B (loan)	Total		72	1	0	0	72	1
Gimnástic	2017–18	Segunda División	14	0	—		14	0
Gimnástic	2018–19	Segunda División	28	3	1	0	29	3
Gimnástic	Total		49	4	2	0	51	4
Cádiz (loan)	2018–19	Segunda División	4	0	—		4	0
Cádiz	2019–20	Segunda División	30	1	1	0	31	1
Cádiz	2020–21	La Liga	34	0	1	0	35	0
Cádiz	2021–22	La Liga	28	0	3	0	31	0
Cádiz	2022–23	La Liga	25	0	0	0	25	0
Cádiz	2023–24	La Liga	30	0	0	0	30	0
Cádiz	Total		147	1	5	0	152	1
Career total			361	9	8	0	369	9
