= Isaac Carcelén =

Spanish footballer

Iza Carcelén
Personal information
- Full name: Isaac Carcelén Valencia
- Date of birth: 23 April 1993 (age 33)
- Place of birth: Puerto de Santa María, Spain
- Height: 1.78 m (5 ft 10 in)
- Position: Right back

Youth career
- Betis

Senior career*
Years	Team	Apps	(Gls)
2011–2015	Betis B	100	(3)
2015–2017	Zaragoza	50	(1)
2017–2018	Cultural Leonesa	35	(4)
2018–2019	Rayo Majadahonda	39	(6)
2019–2026	Cádiz	220	(3)
- * Club domestic league appearances and goals as of 9 June 2026

Isaac Carcelén Valencia (born 23 April 1993), commonly known as Iza, is a Spanish professional footballer who plays as a right back.

== Career ==
Born in El Puerto de Santa María, Cádiz, Andalusia, Iza was a Real Betis' youth graduate. He made his senior debuts with the reserves in 2011, in Segunda División B.

On 1 July 2014, after being an undisputed starter for the B-team in its promotion from Tercera División, Iza renewed his contract for a further year, being included in the first team's pre-season late in the month. He was also regularly used during the 2014–15 campaign, appearing in 33 matches and scoring two goals.

On 6 July 2015 Iza moved to Segunda División with Real Zaragoza, after agreeing to a three-year deal. He made his professional debut on 3 October, coming on as a half-time substitute for Rubén in a 1–0 home win against Deportivo Alavés.

Iza scored his first professional goal on 15 December 2015, netting his side's only in a 3–1 loss at Gimnàstic de Tarragona. On 9 July 2017, Cultural y Deportiva Leonesa and Zaragoza reached an agreement for the transfer of Isaac.

On 21 July 2018, Iza signed for CF Rayo Majadahonda still in the second division. On 1 July of the following year, he agreed to a three-year deal with Cádiz CF in the same category.

== Career statistics ==
As of match played on 4 June 2023

Appearances and goals by club, season and competition
Club	Season	League			Copa del Rey		Total	
Club	Season	Division	Apps	Goals	Apps	Goals	Apps	Goals
Betis B	2011–12	Segunda División B	6	0	—		6	0
Betis B	2012–13	Segunda División B	21	0	—		21	0
Betis B	2013–14	Segunda División B	40	1	—		40	1
Betis B	2014–15	Segunda División B	33	2	—		33	2
Betis B	Total		100	3	—		100	3
Real Zaragoza	2015–16	Segunda División	25	1	1	0	26	1
Real Zaragoza	2016–17	Segunda División	25	0	0	0	25	0
Real Zaragoza	Total		50	1	1	0	51	1
Cultural Leonesa	2017–18	Segunda División	35	4	1	0	36	4
Rayo Majahonda	2018–19	Segunda División	39	6	2	1	41	7
Cádiz	2019–20	Segunda División	39	2	2	0	41	2
Cádiz	2020–21	La Liga	32	0	1	0	33	0
Cádiz	2021–22	La Liga	25	0	2	0	27	0
Cádiz	2022–23	La Liga	27	0	1	0	28	0
Cádiz	Total		123	2	6	0	129	2
Career total			347	15	10	0	357	16
