= Rubén Sobrino =

Spanish footballer

- Sobrino with Valencia in 2019

Personal information
- Full name: Rubén Sobrino Pozuelo
- Date of birth: 1 June 1992 (age 34)
- Place of birth: Daimiel, Spain
- Height: 1.85 m (6 ft 1 in)
- Position: Forward

Team information
- Current team: Panionios
- Number: 9

Youth career
- 1998–2008: Daimiel ED
- 2008–2011: Real Madrid

Senior career*
Years	Team	Apps	(Gls)
2011–2013	Real Madrid C	34	(7)
2011–2014	Real Madrid B	20	(0)
2014–2015	Ponferradina	41	(5)
2015–2017	Manchester City	0	(0)
2015–2016	→ Girona (loan)	10	(2)
2016–2017	→ Alavés (loan)	11	(2)
2017–2019	Alavés	48	(6)
2019–2021	Valencia	23	(1)
2021	→ Cádiz (loan)	16	(1)
2021–2025	Cádiz	137	(11)
2025–2026	Cultural Leonesa	28	(1)
2026–	Panionios	0	(0)

International career
2008–2009	Spain U17	14	(3)
2010	Spain U18	2	(0)
2010–2011	Spain U19	6	(0)
- * Club domestic league appearances and goals as of 31 May 2026

Rubén Sobrino Pozuelo (Spanish pronunciation: [ruˈβen soˈβɾino]; born 1 June 1992) is a Spanish professional footballer who plays as a forward for Super League Greece 2 club Panionios.

== Club career ==
=== Real Madrid C ===
In July 2008, 16-year-old Sobrino joined Real Madrid's Juvenil B team. In 2011–12, he made his senior debut as a 77th-minute substitute for Fran Sol in Real Madrid C's match against Rayo Majadahonda. In 2012–13, he played his first Segunda División B match, starting against Caudal Deportivo.

=== Real Madrid Castilla ===
On 26 May 2013, Sobrino made his first appearance with Real Madrid Castilla, coming on as a substitute for Jesé in an eventual 1–1 draw at Elche.

=== Ponferradina ===
After Castilla's relegation, he moved to Ponferradina on 7 August 2014.

=== Manchester City ===
On 28 August 2015, Sobrino was transferred to Manchester City for a €250,000 fee plus 200,000 on variables.

=== Loan to Girona ===
He was immediately sent on loan to Girona in a season-long deal. On 14 July 2016, he was loaned to La Liga club Alavés for one year with an option to an extension for an additional year.

Sobrino made his debut in the main category of the Spanish football on 16 October 2016, replacing Aleksandar Katai in a 1–1 home draw against Málaga. His first goal in the competition came the following 5 February, as he netted the first in a 4–2 away win against Sporting de Gijón.

=== Alavés ===
On 6 July 2017, Manchester City announced Sobrino would join Alavés on a permanent four-year contract after playing with the club on loan the previous season.

=== Valencia ===
On 31 January 2019, he moved to fellow first division side Valencia CF on a three-and-a-half-year deal.

=== Cádiz ===
On 31 January 2021, after featuring rarely, Sobrino joined fellow top tier side Cádiz CF on loan for the remainder of the season. On 30 August, he signed a permanent three-year contract with the side.

On 31 August 2025, Sobrino terminated his link with the Yellow Submarine.

=== Cultural Leonesa ===
On 2 September 2025, Sobrino signed for Cultural y Deportiva Leonesa also in the second division.

=== Panionios ===
On 18 September 2026, Sobrino signed for Super League Greece 2 club Panionios on a free transfer.

== Career statistics ==
As of match played 4 June 2023

Appearances and goals by club, season and competition
Club	Season	League			Copa del Rey		Other		Total	
Club	Season	Division	Apps	Goals	Apps	Goals	Apps	Goals	Apps	Goals
Real Madrid C	2012–13	Segunda División B	34	7	—		—		34	7
Real Madrid Castilla	2011–12	Segunda División B	1	0	—		—		1	0
Real Madrid Castilla	2012–13	Segunda División	2	0	—		—		2	0
Real Madrid Castilla	2013–14	Segunda División	17	0	—		—		17	0
Real Madrid Castilla	Total		20	0	—		—		20	0
Ponferradina	2014–15	Segunda División	41	5	1	1	—		42	6
Girona (loan)	2015–16	Segunda División	10	2	0	0	4 (Note: Appearance(s) in Segunda División play-offs)	0	14	2
Alavés (loan)	2016–17	La Liga	11	2	5	1	—		16	3
Alavés	2017–18	La Liga	28	3	5	2	—		33	5
Alavés	2018–19	La Liga	20	3	2	1	—		22	4
Alavés	Total		59	8	12	4	—		71	12
Valencia	2018–19	La Liga	4	0	0	0	4 (Note: Appearance(s) in UEFA Europa League)	1	8	1
Valencia	2019–20	La Liga	13	1	3	0	1 (Note: Appearance(s) in Supercopa de España)	0	17	1
Valencia	2020–21	La Liga	5	0	4	1	—		9	1
Valencia	2021–22	La Liga	1	0	0	0	—		1	0
Valencia	Total		23	1	7	1	5	1	35	3
Cádiz (loan)	2020–21	La Liga	16	3	—		—		16	3
Cádiz	2021–22	La Liga	33	4	4	0	—		37	4
Cádiz	2022–23	La Liga	33	3	0	0	—		33	3
Cádiz	Total		66	7	4	0	0	0	70	7
Career total			269	33	24	6	9	1	302	40

== Honours ==
Valencia

- Copa del Rey: 2018–19
