= Conan Ledesma =

Argentine footballer

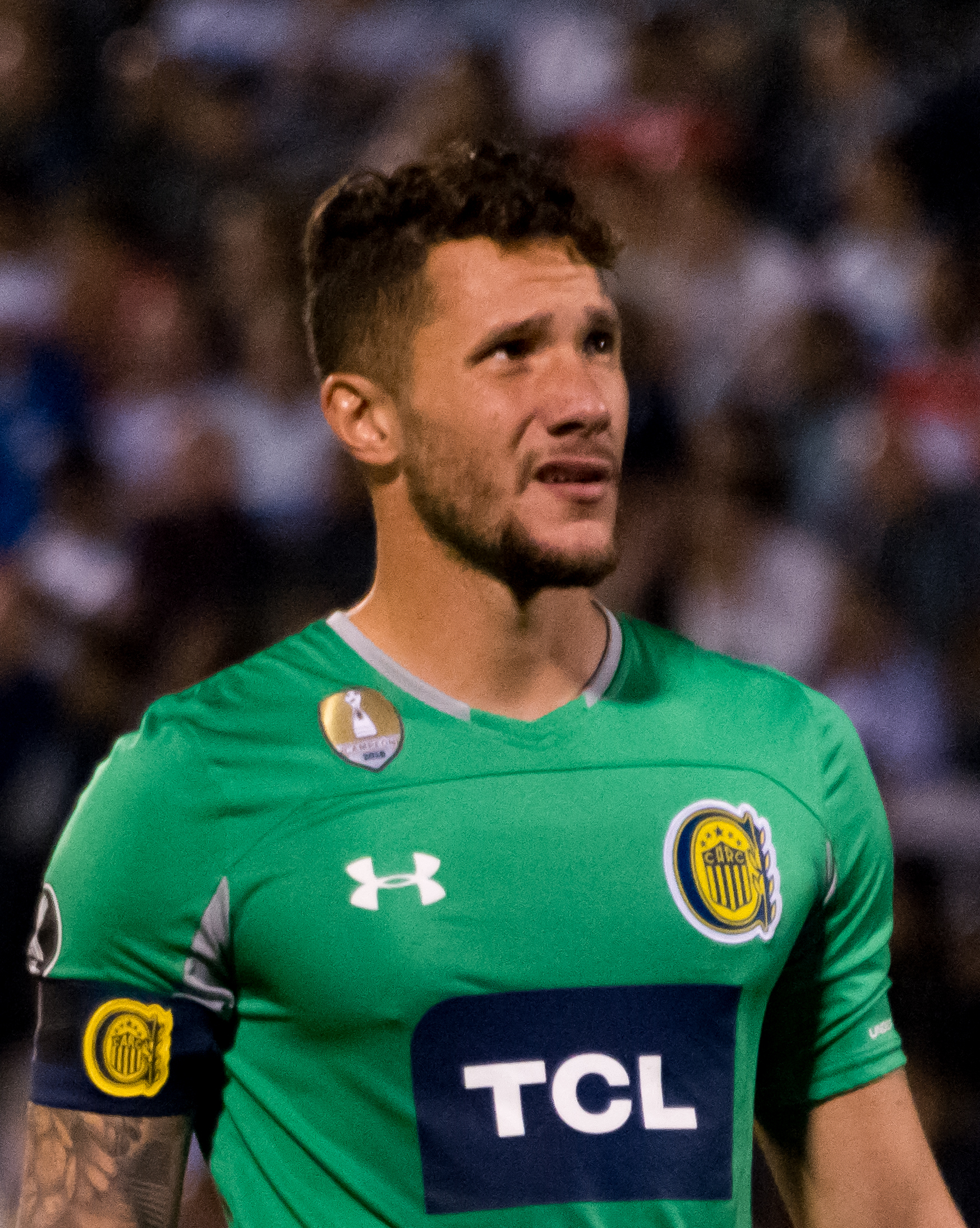
- Ledesma with Rosario Central in 2019

Personal information
- Full name: Jeremías Conan Ledesma
- Date of birth: 13 February 1993 (age 33)
- Place of birth: Pergamino, Argentina
- Height: 1.86 m (6 ft 1 in)
- Position: Goalkeeper

Team information
- Current team: Rosario Central
- Number: 23

Youth career
- Racing Club (P)
- 2006–2013: Rosario Central

Senior career*
Years	Team	Apps	(Gls)
2013–2021	Rosario Central	67	(0)
2020–2021	→ Cádiz (loan)	32	(0)
2021–2024	Cádiz	106	(0)
2024–2026	River Plate	6	(0)
2026	→ Rosario Central (loan)	29	(0)
2026–	Rosario Central	0	(0)

International career
2021	Argentina Olympic (O.P.)	3	(0)
- * Club domestic league appearances and goals as of 17:12, 10 July 2026 (UTC)

Jeremías Conan Ledesma (born 13 February 1993) is an Argentine professional footballer who plays as a goalkeeper for Argentine Primera División club Rosario Central.

== Club career ==
Ledesma had a spell in the ranks of Racing Club de Pergamino, which preceded a move to Rosario Central in 2006. He first appeared in the club's first-team squad in June 2013 when he was an unused substitute for Primera B Nacional matches versus Instituto and Deportivo Merlo. However, it took Ledesma almost five further seasons to make his professional debut. It eventually arrived on 25 April 2017 during a Copa Argentina game with Cañuelas, he played the full duration of a 1–0 win. Six months later, in October, he made his domestic league bow in the Argentine Primera División versus Tigre.

On 25 August 2020, Ledesma moved abroad for the first time in his career after agreeing to a one-year loan deal with La Liga newcomers Cádiz with a purchase option. His first appearance came in an away win against Athletic Bilbao on 1 October. His 100th career match arrived on 29 December in a goalless draw with Valladolid. Ledesma finished the 2020–21 season with 32 appearances before Cádiz triggered the purchase option on 22 May 2021, with Ledesma signing a deal with the Spanish club until the end of June 2025.

== International career ==
In October 2020, Ledesma received a call-up from the Argentina senior squad under manager Lionel Scaloni; to replace the injured Juan Musso.

He was part of the Argentina under-23 squad at the 2020 Summer Olympics in Tokyo, as the overage players allowed per squad.

== Career statistics ==
=== Club ===
As of match played 6 November 2023

Appearances and goals by club, season and competition
Club	Season	League			National cup		League cup		Continental		Other		Total	
Club	Season	Division	Apps	Goals	Apps	Goals	Apps	Goals	Apps	Goals	Apps	Goals	Apps	Goals
Rosario Central	2012–13	Primera B Nacional	0	0	0	0	—		—		—		0	0
Rosario Central	2013–14	Primera División	0	0	0	0	—		—		—		0	0
Rosario Central	2014	Primera División	0	0	0	0	—		0	0	—		0	0
Rosario Central	2015	Primera División	0	0	0	0	—		—		—		0	0
Rosario Central	2016	Primera División	0	0	0	0	—		0	0	—		0	0
Rosario Central	2016–17	Primera División	0	0	1	0	—		—		—		1	0
Rosario Central	2017–18	Primera División	20	0	0	0	—		2 (Note: Appearance(s) in the Copa Sudamericana)	0	—		22	0
Rosario Central	2018–19	Primera División	24	0	7	0	2	0	6 (Note: Appearance(s) in the Copa Libertadores)	0	1 (Note: Appearance(s) in the Supercopa Argentina)	0	40	0
Rosario Central	2019–20	Primera División	23	0	0	0	1	0	0	0	—		24	0
Rosario Central	Total		67	0	8	0	3	0	8	0	1	0	87	0
Cádiz (loan)	2020–21	La Liga	32	0	0	0	—		—		—		32	0
Cádiz	2021–22	La Liga	38	0	0	0	—		—		—		38	0
Cádiz	2022–23	La Liga	34	0	0	0	—		—		—		34	0
Cádiz	2023–24	La Liga	34	0	0	0	—		—		—		34	0
Cádiz	Total		138	0	0	0	—		—		—		138	0
Career total			205	0	8	0	3	0	8	0	1	0	225	0

== Honours ==
Rosario Central

- Primera B Nacional: 2012–13
- Copa Argentina: 2017–18
- Supercopa Internacional: 2026

Individual:

- Copa Argentina Best Player: 2017–18
