= Marc Baró =

Spanish footballer

Personal information
- Full name: Marc Baró Ortiz
- Date of birth: 23 August 1999 (age 27)
- Place of birth: Palma, Spain
- Height: 1.80 m (5 ft 11 in)
- Position: Left back

Team information
- Current team: União Leiria
- Number: 3

Youth career
- La Salle
- 2015–2017: Barcelona
- 2016–2017: → Damm (loan)
- 2017–2018: Valencia

Senior career*
| Years | Team | Apps | (Gls) |
| 2017–2019 | Valencia B | 1 | (0) |
| 2019 | Peralada | 8 | (0) |
| 2019–2020 | Leioa | 14 | (0) |
| 2020–2022 | Cádiz B | 22 | (1) |
| 2020–2022 | Cádiz | 3 | (0) |
| 2021–2022 | → Betis B (loan) | 33 | (0) |
| 2023 | Atlético Baleares | 19 | (2) |
| 2023–2024 | Murcia | 30 | (2) |
| 2024– | União Leiria | 60 | (0) |

International career
| 2015 | Spain U16 | | |
- * Club domestic league appearances and goals as of 19 June 2026

Marc Baró Ortiz (born 23 August 1999) is a Spanish footballer who plays as a left back for Liga Portugal 2 club União de Leiria.

== Club career ==
Born in Palma de Mallorca, Balearic Islands, Baró joined FC Barcelona's La Masia in June 2015, from lowly locals SD La Salle. In 2017, after a one-year loan at CF Damm, he joined Valencia CF and was assigned to the Juvenil A squad.

Baró made his senior debut with Valencia's reserves on 11 November 2017, starting in a 1–2 Segunda División B home loss against Hércules CF. On 31 January 2019, after failing to make the breakthrough, he moved to another reserve team, CF Peralada-Girona B also in the third division.

On 10 July 2019, Baró joined SD Leioa, still in the third division. The following 29 January, after being a regular starter, he agreed to a three-and-a-half-year contract with Cádiz CF, being initially assigned to the B-team in the same category.

In June 2020, Baró was called up to the main squad by manager Álvaro Cervera after the injury of Luismi Quezada, and made his professional debut on 17 July, starting in a 0–1 loss at Girona FC as his side was already promoted.

Baró made his La Liga debut on 23 January 2021, starting in a 0–3 loss at Sevilla FC. On 22 July, he moved to Real Betis' B-side in Primera División RFEF.

On 2 August 2024, Baró signed a three-year contract with União de Leiria in Portugal.
