= Víctor Vázquez (footballer, born 1989) =

Spanish footballer

Personal information
- Full name: Víctor Vázquez Rosales
- Date of birth: 17 October 1989 (age 37)
- Place of birth: Marín, Spain
- Height: 1.80 m (5 ft 11 in)
- Position: Centre-back

Team information
- Current team: Marín

Youth career
- Celta

Senior career*
Years	Team	Apps	(Gls)
2008–2013	Celta B	100	(3)
2009	→ Portonovo (loan)	15	(0)
2010–2011	Celta	3	(0)
2013–2018	Racing Ferrol	158	(4)
2018–2025	Pontevedra	190	(2)
2025–	Marín	31	(1)
- * Club domestic league appearances and goals as of 23:37, 25 September 2026 (UTC)

Víctor Vázquez Rosales (born 17 October 1989), sometimes known as Churre, is a Spanish footballer who plays as a centre-back for Marín CF.

== Club career ==
Born in Marín, Pontevedra, Vázquez graduated from local RC Celta de Vigo's youth system, making his senior debut with the reserves in 2007–08, in the Segunda División B. On 31 January 2009, after not featuring whatsoever in the first half of the season, he joined Galician neighbours Portonovo SD on loan.

Vázquez played his first game as a professional on 6 January 2010, starting for Celta in a 1–1 home draw against Villarreal CF in that campaign's Copa del Rey. His league debut came on 19 June, in a 0–1 loss to SD Huesca in the Segunda División also at Balaídos Stadium.

On 11 July 2013, Vázquez left Celta B and joined Racing de Ferrol, also in his native region and the third tier. He scored his first goal for the club on 10 November against his former team, which was also the 5,000th in Racing's history.

Vázquez continued to play in division three (but also lower) until his retirement, having signed for Pontevedra CF in July 2018. On 10 July 2025, the 35-year-old moved to the regional leagues with his hometown side.
