= Daniel Sotres =

Spanish footballer

Dani Sotres
Personal information
- Full name: Daniel Eduardo Sotres Castañeda
- Date of birth: 21 May 1993 (age 33)
- Place of birth: Santiago de Cudeyo, Spain
- Height: 1.83 m (6 ft 0 in)
- Position: Goalkeeper

Team information
- Current team: Gimnástica

Youth career
- Racing Santander

Senior career*
Years	Team	Apps	(Gls)
2011–2012	Racing B	24	(0)
2012–2014	Racing Santander	26	(0)
2014–2016	Recreativo	27	(0)
2015–2016	→ Racing Santander (loan)	12	(0)
2016–2017	Levante B	27	(0)
2017–2018	Celta B	30	(0)
2018–2020	Salamanca	56	(0)
2020–2021	Cádiz	0	(0)
2020–2021	→ Rayo Majadahonda (loan)	24	(0)
2021–2022	Cultural Leonesa	32	(0)
2023–2024	Gimnástica	39	(0)
2025–	Gimnástica	30	(0)

International career
2012	Spain U19	3	(0)
2013	Spain U20	8	(0)
2013	Spain U21	1	(0)
- * Club domestic league appearances and goals as of 22:30, 21 June 2026 (UTC)

Daniel 'Dani' Eduardo Sotres Castañeda (born 21 May 1993) is a Spanish footballer who plays as a goalkeeper for Tercera Federación club Gimnástica de Torrelavega.

== Club career ==
Sotres was born in Santiago de Cudeyo, Medio Cudeyo, Cantabria. A product of local Racing de Santander's youth ranks, he made his debut for the first team on 9 April 2012 (one month shy of his 19th birthday), coming off the bench to replace the injured Mario Fernández in a 3–0 La Liga away loss against Málaga CF. He was handed his first start three days later, but his team against lost by the same scoreline, at home to RCD Mallorca, being eventually relegated at the season's end.

Sotres was definitely promoted to Racing's main squad for the 2012–13 campaign, going on to feature in 14 Segunda División games – 15 overall – as they again dropped down a level. On 29 January 2014, with the club immerse in a financial crisis, he moved to Recreativo de Huelva but had to wait until March to start playing.

On 29 July 2015, Sotres was loaned back to his first club Racing for one year, with an option to a permanent three-year deal after the expiration of the loan. On 31 August of the following year he signed for another reserve team, Atlético Levante UD also of the third division.

On 10 July 2017, Sotres agreed to a one-year deal at RC Celta de Vigo, being assigned to the B side still in the third tier. On 28 August of the following year, he joined Salamanca CF UDS of the same league.

Sotres returned to the Spanish top flight on 24 July 2020 after signing for Cádiz CF, but was loaned to third-division side CF Rayo Majadahonda on 24 September of that year. In the summer of 2021, he moved to Cultural y Deportiva Leonesa on a two-year contract; on 27 August, his 25th-minute blunder became the first goal of the newly created Primera División RFEF, in a 0–2 home loss against his former employers.

In January 2023, Sotres moved down to Segunda Federación with Gimnástica de Torrelavega on a free transfer.

== International career ==
Sotres won his only cap for Spain at under-21 level on 5 February 2013, replacing Kepa Arrizabalaga at half-time of a 1–1 friendly draw with Belgium.

== Career statistics ==
As of match played 21 June 2026

Appearances and goals by club, season and competition
Club	Season	League			National cup		Other		Total	
Club	Season	Division	Apps	Goals	Apps	Goals	Apps	Goals	Apps	Goals
Racing B	2011–12	Tercera División	24	0	—		—		24	0
Racing Santander	2011–12	La Liga	2	0	0	0	—		2	0
Racing Santander	2012–13	Segunda División	14	0	1	0	—		15	0
Racing Santander	2013–14	Segunda División B	10	0	3	0	—		13	0
Racing Santander	Total		26	0	4	0	—		30	0
Recreativo	2013–14	Segunda División	0	0	0	0	—		0	0
Recreativo	2014–15	Segunda División	27	0	1	0	—		28	0
Recreativo	2016–17	Segunda División B	0	0	0	0	—		0	0
Recreativo	Total		27	0	1	0	—		28	0
Racing Santander (loan)	2015–16	Segunda División B	12	0	0	0	—		12	0
Levante B	2016–17	Segunda División B	27	0	—		2 (Note: Appearances in Segunda División B relegation play-offs)	0	29	0
Celta B	2017–18	Segunda División B	30	0	—		4 (Note: Appearances in Segunda División B promotion play-offs)	0	34	0
Salamanca	2018–19	Segunda División B	29	0	0	0	—		29	0
Salamanca	2019–20	Segunda División B	27	0	0	0	—		27	0
Salamanca	Total		56	0	0	0	—		56	0
Cádiz	2020–21	La Liga	0	0	0	0	—		0	0
Rayo Majadahonda (loan)	2020–21	Segunda División B	24	0	0	0	—		24	0
Cultural Leonesa	2021–22	Primera División RFEF	32	0	0	0	—		32	0
Gimnástica	2022–23	Segunda Federación	12	0	0	0	—		12	0
Gimnástica	2023–24	Segunda Federación	27	0	0	0	—		6	0
Gimnástica	Total		39	0	0	0	—		39	0
Gimnástica	2025–26	Tercera Federación	30	0	2	0	—		32	0
Career total			327	0	7	0	6	0	340	0
