= Saturday Erimuya =

Nigerian footballer (born 1998)

Personal information
- Full name: Saturday Keigo Erimuya
- Date of birth: 10 January 1998 (age 28)
- Place of birth: Benin City, Nigeria
- Height: 1.83 m (6 ft 0 in)
- Position: Centre back

Team information
- Current team: Lorca Deportiva
- Number: 4

Youth career
- 2010–2016: BJ Foundation
- 2016–2018: Cádiz

Senior career*
Years	Team	Apps	(Gls)
2016	BJ Foundation		
2016	→ Kayseri Erciyesspor (loan)	3	(0)
2017–2021	Cádiz B	86	(10)
2019–2022	Cádiz	0	(0)
2021–2022	→ Valladolid B (loan)	29	(0)
2022–2023	Deportivo Aragón	22	(1)
2023–2024	Ceuta	15	(0)
2025	Sant Andreu	15	(2)
2025–	Lorca Deportiva	2	(0)

International career
2016	Nigeria U23	1	(0)
Medal record
Olympic Games
Bronze medal – third place	2016 Rio de Janeiro	Team
- * Club domestic league appearances and goals as of 10 April 2024

Saturday Keigo Erimuya (born 10 January 1998) is a Nigerian professional footballer who plays as a central defender for Spanish Segunda Federación club Lorca Deportiva.

== Club career ==
Between January 2016 and June 2016, Erimuya spent time on loan at Kayseri Erciyesspor in Turkey from Benin-City based BJ Foundation. He was relegated from the 2015–16 TFF First League with the club.

On 26 December 2016, Erimuya signed a four-and-a-half-year contract with Cádiz CF. On 16 September 2019, he extended his contract with the Andalusians until 2023.

On 25 August 2021, Erimuya moved to Real Valladolid on loan for one year, and was assigned to the B-team in Primera División RFEF.

== International career ==
Erimuya was selected by Nigeria for their 18-man Squad for the 2016 Summer Olympics football tournament. He played in one game during the tournament, the bronze medal match against Honduras which Nigeria won 3–2. He was a 92nd minute replacement for Mohammed Usman.

== Honours ==
Nigeria U23

- Olympic Bronze Medal: 2016
