= Seth Airam =

Spanish footballer

Personal information
- Full name: Seth Airam Vega Ramírez
- Date of birth: 1 July 1998 (age 28)
- Place of birth: Gran Canaria, Spain
- Height: 1.80 m (5 ft 11 in)
- Position: Forward

Team information
- Current team: Águilas
- Number: 20

Youth career
- Las Palmas
- Guía
- Lorquí

Senior career*
Years	Team	Apps	(Gls)
2017–2020	Cádiz B	81	(14)
2018–2022	Cádiz	1	(0)
2020	→ Ejea (loan)	7	(0)
2020–2021	→ Recreativo (loan)	23	(5)
2021–2022	→ Villanovense (loan)	26	(4)
2022–2023	Vélez	0	(0)
2022–2023	→ Utsiktens (loan)	6	(0)
2023–2024	San Roque de Lepe	16	(5)
2024–2025	La Unión Atlético	29	(5)
2025–	Águilas	4	(0)
- * Club domestic league appearances and goals as of 28 September 2025

Seth Airam Vega Ramírez (born 1 July 1998), known as Seth Airam or simply Seth, is a Spanish footballer who plays as a forward for Segunda Federación club Águilas.

== Club career ==
Born in Las Palmas, Canary Islands, Airam joined Cádiz CF on 16 April 2017, after finishing his formation with ADM Lorquí. He made his senior debut with the reserves seven days later, coming on as a second-half substitute for David Toro in a 3–1 División de Honor away win against CD Rota.

Airam scored his first senior goals on 7 May 2017, netting a brace in a 4–1 away defeat of AD Cartaya. He made his first-team debut the following 21 January, replacing Álvaro García in a 0–1 away loss against AD Alcorcón in the Segunda División.

On 22 January 2020, after achieving two promotions with the B-team, Airam was loaned to Segunda División B side SD Ejea for six months. On 21 August, he moved to fellow league team Recreativo de Huelva also in a temporary deal.

On 13 August 2021, Airam moved to Segunda División RFEF side CF Villanovense on a one-year loan deal.
