= Marcos Mauro =

Argentine footballer (born 1991)

Personal information
- Full name: Marcos Mauro López Gutiérrez
- Date of birth: 9 January 1991 (age 35)
- Place of birth: Claypole, Argentina
- Height: 1.87 m (6 ft 2 in)
- Position: Centre-back

Team information
- Current team: Fuenlabrada

Youth career
- 1997–2007: Santa Clara
- 2007–2008: El Bercial
- 2008–2009: Fuenlabrada

Senior career*
Years	Team	Apps	(Gls)
2009–2013	Fuenlabrada	128	(4)
2013–2017	Villarreal B	58	(2)
2013–2014	→ Huesca (loan)	23	(2)
2014–2015	→ La Roda (loan)	31	(3)
2017–2022	Cádiz	92	(6)
2022	Juárez	7	(0)
2023	Ibiza	8	(0)
2023–2024	Murcia	19	(0)
2024–	Fuenlabrada	29	(1)
- * Club domestic league appearances and goals as of 10 June 2025

Marcos Mauro López Gutiérrez (born 9 January 1991), known as Marcos Mauro, is an Argentine professional footballer who plays as a central defender for Segunda Federación club Fuenlabrada.

== Club career ==
Born in Claypole, Buenos Aires, Marcos Mauro finished his youth career in Spain with CF Fuenlabrada after his parents had moved to the country in search of better working conditions. He made his senior debut on 4 January 2009, starting in a 3–0 Tercera División home loss against Real Madrid C.

Marcos Mauro established himself as a starter the following seasons, achieving promotion to Segunda División B in 2012. On 11 August 2013 he signed a four-year contract with Villarreal CF, being immediately loaned to SD Huesca of the third division.

On 1 September 2014, Marcos Mauro was loaned to La Roda CF in the same league. The following 10 August, he was assigned to Villarreal's reserves still in the third tier.

On 12 July 2017, Marcos Mauro joined Segunda División club Cádiz CF on a three-year deal. He made his professional debut on 19 August, starting in a 2–1 away win over Córdoba CF.

Marcos Mauro scored his first goal in division two on 18 November 2018, his team's second in a 3–1 away defeat of Córdoba. On 21 July 2020, after promoting to La Liga (17 matches and two goals from the player), he agreed to an extension until 2022. His bow in the latter competition took place on 12 September 2020 in the 0–2 home loss to CA Osasuna, and he scored his first goal the following 4 April to help the hosts beat Valencia CF 2–1.

On 29 December 2022, following a brief spell at Liga MX side FC Juárez, Marcos Mauro returned to Spain and its second division with UD Ibiza. Subsequently, he dropped down to the country's Primera Federación, first with Real Murcia CF and later returning to Fuenlabrada.

== Career statistics ==
As of match played 16 May 2021

Appearances and goals by club, season and competition
Club	Season	League			National Cup		Total	
Club	Season	Division	Apps	Goals	Apps	Goals	Apps	Goals
Fuenlabrada	2012–13	Segunda División B	33	1	1	0	34	1
Huesca (loan)	2013–14	Segunda División B	23	2	2	0	25	2
La Roda (loan)	2014–15	Segunda División B	31	3	—		31	3
Villarreal B	2015–16	Segunda División B	35	2	—		35	2
Villarreal B	2016–17	Segunda División B	23	0	—		23	0
Villarreal B	Total		58	2	0	0	58	2
Cádiz	2017–18	Segunda División	23	0	3	0	26	0
Cádiz	2018–19	Segunda División	25	2	3	0	28	2
Cádiz	2019–20	Segunda División	17	2	0	0	17	2
Cádiz	2020–21	La Liga	24	1	0	0	24	1
Cádiz	Total		89	5	6	0	95	5
Career total			234	13	9	0	243	13
