= David Mayoral =

Spanish footballer

Personal information
- Full name: David Mayoral Lastras
- Date of birth: 5 April 1997 (age 29)
- Place of birth: Ávila, Spain
- Height: 1.72 m (5 ft 8 in)
- Position: Winger

Youth career
- 2003–2012: Ávila
- 2012–2014: Santa Marta
- 2014–2016: Valladolid

Senior career*
Years	Team	Apps	(Gls)
2013–2014	Santa Marta	14	(3)
2015–2019	Valladolid B	76	(12)
2016–2019	Valladolid	4	(0)
2017	→ UCAM Murcia (loan)	7	(0)
2018–2019	→ Alcorcón (loan)	13	(0)
2019–2020	UCAM Murcia	24	(2)
2020–2022	Cádiz	0	(0)
2020–2021	→ Hermannstadt (loan)	27	(5)
2021–2022	→ Lugo (loan)	4	(0)

International career
2015	Spain U18	2	(0)
- * Club domestic league appearances and goals as of 18 September 2021

David Mayoral Lastras (born 5 April 1997) is a Spanish footballer who plays mainly as a right winger.

== Club career ==
Mayoral was born in Ávila, Castile and León, and played youth football for Real Ávila and UD Santa Marta. He made his senior debut with the latter on 30 November 2013, in a 2–0 Tercera División away win against CD La Virgen del Camino. He scored his first senior goal on 12 April of the following year, netting the last in a 1–3 loss at CD La Granja.

In July 2014 Mayoral joined Real Valladolid, returning to youth football. He made his first team debut on 21 August 2016, coming on as a late substitute for goalscorer José Arnaiz in a 1–0 Segunda División home win against Real Oviedo.

On 6 March 2017 Mayoral renewed with the Blanquivioletas until 2020, and was immediately loaned to UCAM Murcia CF also in the second tier, until the end of the campaign. Upon returning he was promoted to the first-team, but continued to appear mainly with the B's and contributed with only three appearances in the club's promotion to La Liga.

On 28 August 2018, Mayoral was loaned to second division side AD Alcorcón for the season. Roughly one year later he returned to UCAM, agreeing to a permanent contract with the side now in Segunda División B.

On 25 July 2020, Mayoral moved straight to the top tier after signing a three-year deal with Cádiz CF, but was loaned to Romanian Liga I side FC Hermannstadt on 7 September.

On 24 June 2021, Mayoral moved to CD Lugo in the second level on a one-year loan deal.
