= Sergio González (footballer, born 1997) =

Spanish footballer

Personal information
- Full name: Sergio González Martínez
- Date of birth: 14 May 1997 (age 29)
- Place of birth: Cartagena, Spain
- Height: 1.84 m (6 ft 0 in)
- Position: Centre back

Team information
- Current team: Burgos
- Number: 6

Youth career
- Cartagena
- 2013–2016: Cádiz

Senior career*
| Years | Team | Apps | (Gls) |
| 2015–2020 | Cádiz B | 118 | (10) |
| 2016–2021 | Cádiz | 21 | (0) |
| 2021 | → Tenerife (loan) | 15 | (1) |
| 2021–2025 | Tenerife | 132 | (3) |
| 2025– | Burgos | 31 | (0) |
- * Club domestic league appearances and goals as of 6 June 2026

Sergio González Martínez (born 14 May 1997) is a Spanish footballer who plays as a central defender for Burgos CF.

== Club career ==
Born in Cartagena, Murcia, González was a Cádiz CF youth graduate. He made his senior debut with the reserves on 17 May 2015, starting in a 2–3 Tercera División away loss against CD Mairena.

González made his first team debut on 15 May 2016, starting in a 1–0 away win against Real Jaén in the Segunda División B. His professional debut occurred on 11 January 2018 as he started in a 1–2 loss at Sevilla FC in the season's Copa del Rey.

On 9 July 2018, González signed a new three-year contract. He made his Segunda División debut on 23 February 2019, playing 12 minutes in a 3–2 away win against Gimnàstic de Tarragona.

On 21 January 2020, González renewed his contract with the Amarillos until 2023, and finished the campaign with 17 appearances for the first team as his side achieved promotion to La Liga. Definitely promoted to the main squad for 2020–21, he made his debut in the top tier on 12 September by starting in a 0–2 home loss against CA Osasuna.

Shortly after his top tier debut, however, González was separated from the first team squad, being unable to play for Cádiz. On 12 January 2021, he moved on loan to second division side CD Tenerife until the end of the campaign.

On 21 July 2021, González signed a permanent three-year contract with Tenerife. On 27 July 2025, after suffering relegation, he agreed to a two-year deal with Burgos CF also in the second division.
