= Jean-Pierre Rhyner =

Swiss footballer (born 1996)

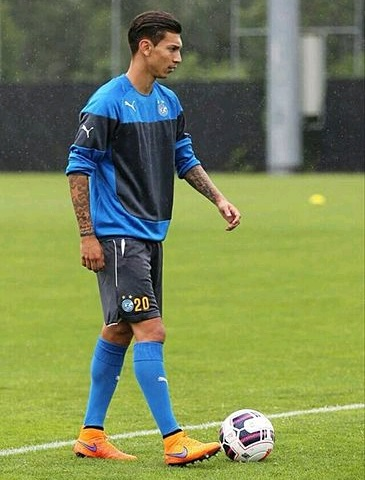
- Rhyner with Grasshoppers in 2015

Personal information
- Full name: Jean-Pierre Patrick Rhyner Pebe
- Date of birth: 16 March 1996 (age 30)
- Place of birth: Zürich, Switzerland
- Height: 1.88 m (6 ft 2 in)
- Position: Centre-back

Team information
- Current team: Vizela
- Number: 4

Youth career
- 2005–2016: Grasshoppers

Senior career*
Years	Team	Apps	(Gls)
2016–2019	Grasshoppers	35	(2)
2017–2018	→ Schaffhausen (loan)	26	(2)
2019–2021	Cádiz	8	(1)
2020–2021	→ Cartagena (loan)	6	(0)
2021	→ Emmen (loan)	2	(0)
2021–2022	Volos	15	(2)
2022–2024	Schaffhausen	41	(0)
2024–	Vizela	47	(1)

International career
2014	Peru U20	2	(0)
2015–2017	Switzerland U20	6	(0)
2016–2017	Switzerland U21	5	(0)
- * Club domestic league appearances and goals as of 19 June 2026

Jean-Pierre Patrick Rhyner Pebe (born 16 March 1996) is a Swiss professional footballer who plays as a centre-back for Liga Portugal 2 club Vizela. A former youth international for Peru, he has most recently represented Switzerland at youth level.

== Club career ==
A youth product of Grasshoppers, Rhyner made his professional debut with his childhood team in a 2–0 2016–17 UEFA Europa League qualifying phase and play-off round loss to Fenerbahçe on 25 August 2016. He debuted for Grasshoppers in the Swiss Challenge League in a 4–0 loss to on 23 October 2016. On 30 January 2017, Rhyner was loaned out to Schaffhausen to gain first-team experience in the Swiss Challenge League.

On 8 January 2018, Rhyner returned to Grasshoppers after a successful year with Schaffhausen.

On 10 July 2019, Rhyner moved abroad and joined Spanish Segunda División side Cádiz CF on a three-year deal. On 5 October of the following year, after featuring rarely as his side achieved promotion to La Liga, he moved to FC Cartagena in the second division, on loan for one year.

On 16 January 2021, Rhyner moved to Eredivisie side FC Emmen, also in a temporary deal.

On 30 June 2021, he was announced by the Greek Super League side Volos as their new transfer.

On 8 July 2022, Rhyner returned to Schaffhausen.

On 17 July 2024, Rhyner signed a two-year contract with Vizela in Portugal.

== International career ==
Born in Switzerland to a Swiss father and a Peruvian mother, Rhyner first represented the Peru national under-20 football team in a pair of friendlies in 2014 against the Venezuela U20s and Colombia u20s. Rhyner is also a youth international for Switzerland at the U20, and U21 levels. On 22 July 2020, FIFA approved a one-time nationality switch for Rhyner, making him eligible to represent Peru.

== Career statistics ==
=== Club ===
As of 21 January 2022

Appearances and goals by club, season and competition
Club	Season	League			Cup		Continental		Other		Total	
Club	Season	Division	Apps	Goals	Apps	Goals	Apps	Goals	Apps	Goals	Apps	Goals
Grasshoppers	2015–16	Swiss Super League	0	0	1	0	—		—		1	0
Grasshoppers	2016–17	Swiss Super League	1	0	2	0	1	0	—		4	0
Grasshoppers	2017–18	Swiss Super League	14	1	1	0	—		—		15	1
Grasshoppers	2018–19	Swiss Super League	20	1	2	0	—		—		22	1
Grasshoppers	Total		35	2	6	0	1	0	—		42	2
Schaffhausen (loan)	2016–17	Swiss Challenge League	9	0	—		—		—		9	0
Schaffhausen (loan)	2017–18	Swiss Challenge League	17	2	1	0	—		—		18	2
Schaffhausen (loan)	Total		26	2	1	0	—		—		27	2
Cádiz	2019–20	Segunda División	8	1	1	0	—		—		9	1
Cartagena (loan)	2020–21	Segunda División	6	0	1	0	—		—		7	0
Emmen (loan)	2020–21	Eredivisie	2	0	—		—		—		2	0
Volos	2021–22	Super League Greece	8	2	2	0	—		—		10	2
Career total			85	2	11	0	1	0	0	0	97	7
