= 2017 Segunda División play-offs =

Segunda División play-offs
- Season: 2016–17
- Promoted: Getafe
- Matches played: 6
- Goals scored: 14 (2.33 per match)

The 2016–17 Segunda División play-offs took place in June 2017 and determined third team which was promoted to the top division. Teams placed between 3rd and 6th position excluding reserve teams will take part in the promotion play-offs.

Getafe achieved the promotion berth one year after their relegation.

== Regulations ==
The regulations were the same as the previous season: in the semi-finals, the fifth-placed team faced the fourth-placed team, while the sixth-placed team faced the third. Each tie was played over two legs, with the team lower in the table hosting the first leg.

The team that scored more goals on aggregate over the two legs advanced to the next round. If the aggregate score was level, the away goals rule was applied (i.e., the team that scored more goals away from home over the two legs advanced). If away goals were also equal, then thirty minutes of extra time would be played. The away goals rule would again be applied after extra time (i.e., if there were goals scored during extra time and the aggregate score was still level, the visiting team advanced by virtue of more away goals scored). If no goals were scored during extra time, the winner would be the best positioned team in the regular season.

== Road to the play-offs ==
Pos	Team	Pld	W	D	L	GF	GA	GD	Pts	Promotion, qualification or relegation
3	Getafe (O, P)	42	18	14	10	55	43	+12	68	Qualification to promotion play-offs
4	Tenerife	42	16	18	8	50	37	+13	66	Qualification to promotion play-offs
5	Cádiz	42	16	16	10	55	40	+15	64	Qualification to promotion play-offs
6	Huesca	42	16	15	11	53	43	+10	63 (Note: Huesca finished ahead of Valladolid on head-to-head points: Valladolid 1–2 Huesca, Huesca 1–0 Valladolid)	Qualification to promotion play-offs

Source: La Liga
Rules for classification: 1) points; 2) head-to-head points; 3) head-to-head goal difference; 4) goal difference; 5) number of goals scored
(O) Play-off winners; (P) Promoted

== Bracket ==
Semi-finals
Cádiz	1	0	1
Tenerife (b.p.)	0	1	1
Huesca	2	0	2
Getafe	2	3	5

Final
Tenerife	1	1	2
Getafe	0	3	3

=== Semifinals ===
Team 1	Agg.	Team 2	1st leg	2nd leg
Huesca	2–5	Getafe	2–2	0–3
Cádiz	1–1 (b.p.)	Tenerife	1–0	0–1 (a.e.t.)

==== First leg ====
14 June 2017
21:00 (CEST)

Huesca	2–2	Getafe
Vinícius 76'; Camacho 90+4'	Report	Molina 51' (pen.), 74'

El Alcoraz, Huesca
Attendance: 4,867
Referee: Gorostegui Fernández-Ortega

Huesca	Getafe

GK	1	(Spain) Sergio Herrera
LB	20	(Serbia) Rajko Brežančić
CB	2	(Portugal) Jair	(yellow card) 50'
CB	4	(Spain) Carlos David	(yellow card) 20'
RB	15	(Equatorial Guinea) Carlos Akapo		(substituted off) 78'
CM	5	(Spain) Juan Aguilera	(yellow card) 59'
CM	8	(Spain) Gonzalo Melero
LW	7	(Spain) David Ferreiro	(yellow card) 47'
AM	14	(Spain) Samu Sáiz
RW	17	(Spain) Álvaro Vadillo		(substituted off) 73'
CF	9	(Spain) Borja Lázaro	(yellow card) 58'	(substituted off) 75'
Substitutions:
GK	25	(Spain) Javi Jiménez
MF	10	(Spain) Juanjo Camacho		(substituted in) 78'
FW	11	(Brazil) Vinícius		(substituted in) 75'
MF	19	(Venezuela) Alexander González
DF	21	(Spain) Íñigo López
MF	22	(Spain) Lluís Sastre
MF	23	(Spain) David López		(substituted in) 73'
Manager:
(Spain) Juan Antonio Anquela

GK	13	(Spain) Vicente Guaita
LB	15	(Spain) Francisco Molinero
CB	6	(Argentina) Cata Díaz
CB	16	(Spain) Cala
RB	22	(Uruguay) Damián Suárez
LW	12	(Spain) Francisco Portillo	(yellow card) 77'	(substituted off) 86'
CM	25	(Spain) Sergio Mora	(yellow card) 15'	(substituted off) 65'
CM	4	(Argentina) Alejandro Faurlín	(yellow card) 12'
RW	14	(Spain) David Fuster		(substituted off) 71'
CF	11	(Spain) Chuli	(yellow card) 79'
CF	19	(Spain) Jorge Molina
Substitutions:
GK	1	(Spain) Alberto
DF	2	(Spain) Carlos Peña
MF	8	(Algeria) Mehdi Lacen		(substituted in) 65'
FW	10	(Serbia) Stefan Šćepović
DF	17	(Argentina) Nicolás Gorosito		(substituted in) 86'
MF	20	(Spain) Dani Pacheco		(substituted in) 71'
MF	23	(Spain) Álvaro Jiménez
Manager:
(Spain) José Bordalás

15 June 2017
21:00 (CEST)

Cádiz	1–0	Tenerife
Aketxe 64'	Report

Ramón de Carranza, Cádiz
Attendance: 16,493
Referee: Arcediano Monescillo

Cádiz	Tenerife

GK	1	(Spain) Alberto Cifuentes
LB	14	(Spain) Brian Oliván
CB	17	(Senegal) Khalifa Sankaré
CB	4	(Spain) Aridane
LB	2	(Spain) Javier Carpio
CM	6	(Spain) José Mari	(yellow card) 69'
CM	6	(Spain) Jon Ander Garrido
LM	11	(Spain) Álvaro García		(substituted off) 90+4'
AM	23	(Spain) Ager Aketxe
RM	7	(Spain) Salvi		(substituted off) 62'
CF	18	(Spain) Rubén Cruz	(yellow card) 80'	(substituted off) 85'
Substitutions:
GK	13	(Spain) Jesús Fernández
DF	3	(Spain) Servando
FW	19	(Spain) Alfredo Ortuño		(substituted in) 85'
MF	20	(Spain) Nico Hidalgo
FW	22	(Spain) Jesús Imaz
MF	24	(Comoros) Rafidine Abdullah		(substituted in) 62'
MF	26	(Spain) Aitor García		(substituted in) 90+4'
Manager:
(Spain) Álvaro Cervera

GK	25	(Venezuela) Dani Hernández	(yellow card) 38'
LB	4	(France) Samuel Camille
CB	21	(Spain) Jorge Sáenz	(yellow card) 69'
CB	3	(Spain) Germán Sánchez
RB	23	(Spain) Raúl Cámara	(yellow card) 70'
CM	6	(Spain) Vitolo	(yellow card) 60'
CM	16	(Spain) Aitor Sanz
LW	20	(Japan) Gaku Shibasaki
AM	22	(Spain) Tyronne		(substituted off) 59'
RW	17	(Spain) Aarón		(substituted off) 66'
CF	31	(Senegal) Amath		(substituted off) 76'
Substitutions:
GK	1	(Spain) Ismael Falcón
DF	5	(Spain) Alberto	(yellow card) 88'	(substituted in) 66'
MF	7	(Spain) Omar Perdomo
FW	9	(Honduras) Anthony Lozano		(substituted in) 59'
MF	10	(Spain) Suso		(substituted in) 76'
DF	14	(Spain) Carlos Ruiz
FW	18	(Tunisia) Haythem Jouini
Manager:
(Spain) José Luis Martí

==== Second leg ====
17 June 2017
21:00 (CEST)

Getafe	3–0	Huesca
Cala 36'; Pacheco 63'; Fuster 74'	Report

Coliseum Alfonso Pérez, Getafe
Attendance: 13,013
Referee: Pérez Montero

Getafe	Huesca

GK	13	(Spain) Vicente Guaita
LB	15	(Spain) Francisco Molinero	(yellow card) 8'
CB	6	(Argentina) Cata Díaz
CB	16	(Spain) Cala
RB	22	(Uruguay) Damián Suárez
LW	12	(Spain) Francisco Portillo	(yellow card) 58'	(substituted off) 78'
CM	4	(Argentina) Alejandro Faurlín	(yellow card) 85'
CM	8	(Algeria) Mehdi Lacen	(yellow card) 80'
RW	23	(Spain) Álvaro Jiménez
CF	19	(Spain) Jorge Molina		(substituted off) 79'
CF	20	(Spain) Dani Pacheco	(red card) 87'	(substituted off) 69'
Substitutions:
GK	1	(Spain) Alberto
DF	2	(Spain) Carlos Peña
MF	5	(Romania) Paul Anton	(yellow card) 85'	(substituted in) 78'
FW	10	(Serbia) Stefan Šćepović		(substituted in) 79'
FW	11	(Spain) Chuli
MF	14	(Spain) David Fuster		(substituted in) 69'
DF	17	(Argentina) Nicolás Gorosito
Manager:
(Spain) José Bordalás

GK	1	(Spain) Sergio Herrera
LB	20	(Serbia) Rajko Brežančić
CB	21	(Spain) Íñigo López
CB	4	(Spain) Carlos David	(yellow card) 36'	(substituted off) 64'
RB	15	(Equatorial Guinea) Carlos Akapo		(substituted off) 70'
CM	5	(Spain) Juan Aguilera	(yellow card) 85'
CM	8	(Spain) Gonzalo Melero
LW	7	(Spain) David Ferreiro	(yellow card) 85'
AM	14	(Spain) Samu Sáiz	(yellow card) 89'
RW	23	(Spain) David López		(substituted off) 55'
CF	11	(Brazil) Vinícius
Substitutions:
GK	13	(Spain) Queco Piña
DF	2	(Portugal) Jair
FW	9	(Spain) Borja Lázaro		(substituted in) 70'
MF	10	(Spain) Juanjo Camacho		(substituted in) 64'
MF	17	(Spain) Álvaro Vadillo	(yellow card) 58'	(substituted in) 58'
MF	19	(Venezuela) Alexander González
MF	22	(Spain) Lluís Sastre
Manager:
(Spain) Juan Antonio Anquela

18 June 2017
20:00 (WEST)

Tenerife	1–0 (a.e.t.)	Cádiz
Shibasaki 34'	Report

Heliodoro Rodríguez López, Santa Cruz de Tenerife
Attendance: 20,761
Referee: Areces Franco

Tenerife	Cádiz

GK	25	(Venezuela) Dani Hernández
LB	4	(France) Samuel Camille
CB	21	(Spain) Jorge Sáenz
CB	3	(Spain) Germán Sánchez	(yellow card) 102'
RB	23	(Spain) Raúl Cámara	(yellow card) 31'
LW	20	(Japan) Gaku Shibasaki
CM	6	(Spain) Vitolo
CM	16	(Spain) Aitor Sanz	(yellow card) 43'	(substituted off) 71'
RW	10	(Spain) Suso		(substituted off) 79'
CF	9	(Honduras) Anthony Lozano		(substituted off) 103'
CF	31	(Senegal) Amath
Substitutions:
GK	1	(Spain) Ismael Falcón
DF	5	(Spain) Alberto		(substituted in) 71'
MF	7	(Spain) Omar Perdomo		(substituted in) 103'
DF	14	(Spain) Carlos Ruiz
MF	17	(Spain) Aarón
FW	18	(Tunisia) Haythem Jouini
MF	22	(Spain) Tyronne		(substituted in) 79'
Manager:
(Spain) José Luis Martí

GK	1	(Spain) Alberto Cifuentes
LB	14	(Spain) Brian Oliván		(substituted off) 101'
CB	17	(Senegal) Khalifa Sankaré	(yellow card) 20'
CB	4	(Spain) Aridane	(yellow card) 77'
LB	2	(Spain) Javier Carpio
CM	6	(Spain) José Mari	(yellow card) 51'
CM	6	(Spain) Jon Ander Garrido		(substituted off) 68'
LM	11	(Spain) Álvaro García
AM	23	(Spain) Ager Aketxe
RM	7	(Spain) Salvi		(substituted off) 83'
CF	18	(Spain) Rubén Cruz
Substitutions:
GK	13	(Spain) Jesús Fernández
MF	16	(Azerbaijan) Eddy Silvestre
FW	19	(Spain) Alfredo Ortuño		(substituted in) 83'
DF	21	(Spain) Migue
FW	22	(Spain) Jesús Imaz
MF	24	(Comoros) Rafidine Abdullah		(substituted in) 68'
MF	26	(Spain) Aitor García		(substituted in) 101'
Manager:
(Spain) Álvaro Cervera

=== Final ===
Team 1	Agg.	Team 2	1st leg	2nd leg
Tenerife	2–3	Getafe	1–0	1–3

==== First leg ====
21 June 2017
20:00 (WEST)

Tenerife	1–0	Getafe
Sáenz 22'	Report

Heliodoro Rodríguez López, Santa Cruz de Tenerife
Attendance: 21,450
Referee: Arias López

Tenerife	Getafe

GK	25	(Venezuela) Dani Hernández
LB	4	(France) Samuel Camille
CB	21	(Spain) Jorge Sáenz
CB	3	(Spain) Germán Sánchez
RB	23	(Spain) Raúl Cámara
LW	20	(Japan) Gaku Shibasaki		(substituted off) 83'
CM	6	(Spain) Vitolo
CM	16	(Spain) Aitor Sanz
RW	10	(Spain) Suso		(substituted off) 80'
CF	9	(Honduras) Anthony Lozano
CF	31	(Senegal) Amath		(substituted off) 68'
Substitutions:
GK	1	(Spain) Ismael Falcón
DF	5	(Spain) Alberto		(substituted in) 68'
MF	7	(Spain) Omar Perdomo	(yellow card) 88'	(substituted in) 80'
DF	14	(Spain) Carlos Ruiz
MF	17	(Spain) Aarón		(substituted in) 83'
MF	22	(Spain) Tyronne
FW	26	(Spain) Cristo González
Manager:
(Spain) José Luis Martí

GK	13	(Spain) Vicente Guaita
LB	15	(Spain) Francisco Molinero
CB	6	(Argentina) Cata Díaz
CB	16	(Spain) Cala	(yellow card) 33'	(substituted off) 78'
RB	22	(Uruguay) Damián Suárez
CM	4	(Argentina) Alejandro Faurlín		(substituted off) 70'
CM	8	(Algeria) Mehdi Lacen	(yellow card) 75'
LW	12	(Spain) Francisco Portillo	(yellow card) 71'
AM	14	(Spain) David Fuster
RW	23	(Spain) Álvaro Jiménez		(substituted off) 67'
CF	19	(Spain) Jorge Molina
Substitutions:
GK	1	(Spain) Alberto
DF	2	(Spain) Carlos Peña
MF	5	(Romania) Paul Anton		(substituted in) 70'
FW	7	(Argentina) Emi
FW	10	(Serbia) Stefan Šćepović
FW	11	(Spain) Chuli	(yellow card) 87'	(substituted in) 67'
DF	17	(Argentina) Nicolás Gorosito		(substituted in) 78'
Manager:
(Spain) José Bordalás

==== Second leg ====
24 June 2017
21:00 (CEST)

Getafe	3–1	Tenerife
Faurlín 9'; Pacheco 12', 37'	Report	Lozano 17'

Coliseum Alfonso Pérez, Getafe
Attendance: 15,380
Referee: Prieto Iglesias

Getafe	Tenerife

GK	13	(Spain) Vicente Guaita
LB	15	(Spain) Francisco Molinero
CB	6	(Argentina) Cata Díaz
DF	17	(Argentina) Nicolás Gorosito
RB	22	(Uruguay) Damián Suárez
LW	12	(Spain) Francisco Portillo
CM	25	(Spain) Sergio Mora	(yellow card) 67'	(substituted off) 77'
CM	4	(Argentina) Alejandro Faurlín
RW	20	(Spain) Dani Pacheco		(substituted off) 89'
FW	11	(Spain) Chuli		(substituted off) 72'
CF	19	(Spain) Jorge Molina
Substitutions:
GK	1	(Spain) Alberto
DF	2	(Spain) Carlos Peña	(yellow card) 89'	(substituted in) 89'
MF	5	(Romania) Paul Anton
MF	8	(Algeria) Mehdi Lacen		(substituted in) 77'
FW	10	(Serbia) Stefan Šćepović
FW	14	(Spain) David Fuster
MF	23	(Spain) Álvaro Jiménez		(substituted in) 72'
Manager:
(Spain) José Bordalás

GK	25	(Venezuela) Dani Hernández
LB	4	(France) Samuel Camille	(yellow card) 90+7'
CB	21	(Spain) Jorge Sáenz
CB	3	(Spain) Germán Sánchez
RB	23	(Spain) Raúl Cámara	(yellow card) 36'	(substituted off) 86'
LW	20	(Japan) Gaku Shibasaki		(substituted off) 51'
CM	6	(Spain) Vitolo
CM	16	(Spain) Aitor Sanz	(yellow card) 90+1'
RW	10	(Spain) Suso	(yellow card) 59'	(substituted off) 62'
CF	9	(Honduras) Anthony Lozano
CF	31	(Senegal) Amath
Substitutions:
GK	1	(Spain) Ismael Falcón
DF	5	(Spain) Alberto
MF	7	(Spain) Omar Perdomo	(yellow card) 48'
DF	14	(Spain) Carlos Ruiz
MF	17	(Spain) Aarón		(substituted in) 51'
FW	18	(Tunisia) Haythem Jouini		(substituted in) 86'
MF	22	(Spain) Tyronne		(substituted in) 62'
Manager:
(Spain) José Luis Martí

Promoted to La Liga
Getafe
(One year later)
