= 2017–18 Cádiz CF season =

Cádiz CF
2017–18 season
- Chairman: Manuel Vizcaíno
- Manager: Álvaro Cervera
- Stadium: Ramón de Carranza
- Segunda División: 9th
- Copa Del Rey: Round of 16
Home colours	Away colours

During the 2017–18 season, Cádiz CF are participating in the Spanish LaLiga 1|2|3, and the Copa del Rey.

== Squad ==
As of 2 September 2017

Note: Flags indicate national team as defined under FIFA eligibility rules; some limited exceptions apply. Players may hold more than one non-FIFA nationality.

No.	Pos.	Nation	Player
1	GK	ESP	Alberto Cifuentes (2nd captain)
2	DF	ESP	Javier Carpio
3	DF	ESP	Servando (Captain)
4	DF	VEN	Mikel Villanueva (on loan from Málaga)
5	MF	ESP	Jon Ander Garrido (3rd captain)
6	MF	ESP	José Mari
7	MF	ESP	Salvi
8	FW	ESP	Alberto Perea
9	FW	ESP	David Barral
10	FW	ESP	Rubén Cruz
11	MF	ESP	Álvaro García
12	DF	ESP	Rober Correa
13	GK	ESP	Rubén Yáñez (on loan from Getafe)

No.	Pos.	Nation	Player
14	DF	ESP	Brian Oliván
15	DF	ARG	Marcos Mauro
16	DF	NED	Lucas Bijker
17	MF	ESP	Aitor García
18	MF	ESP	Álex Fernández
19	FW	ESP	Dani Romera
20	MF	ESP	Nico Hidalgo
21	FW	ESP	José Ángel Carrillo
22	FW	ESP	Moha Traoré
23	DF	SEN	Khalifa Sankaré
24	MF	COM	Rafidine Abdullah
25	DF	MNE	Ivan Kecojević
26	GK	ESP	David Gil

=== Transfers ===
- List of Spanish football transfers summer 2017#Cádiz

==== In ====
Date	Player	From	Type	Fee	Ref
30 June 2017	(Spain) Carlos Calvo	(Spain) Badalona	Loan return	Free	
30 June 2017	(Spain) Alberto Quintana	(Spain) Rayo Majadahonda	Loan return	Free	
1 July 2017	(Spain) Brian Oliván	(Spain) Granada B	Transfer	€500K	
1 July 2017	(Spain) Nico Hidalgo	(Italy) Juventus	Transfer	Free	
1 July 2017	(Spain) Moha	(Spain) Córdoba	Transfer	Free	
12 July 2017	(Argentina) Marcos Mauro	(Spain) Villarreal B	Transfer	Free	
12 July 2017	(Spain) David Barral	(Cyprus) APOEL	Transfer	Free	
17 July 2017	(Spain) Dani Romera	(Spain) Barcelona B	Transfer	€350K	
17 July 2017	(Spain) Alberto Perea	(Spain) Barcelona B	Transfer	Free	
7 August 2017	(Spain) Rober Correa	(Spain) Espanyol	Transfer	Free	
7 August 2017	(Netherlands) Lucas Bijker	(Netherlands) Heerenveen	Transfer	Free	
7 August 2017	(Spain) Álex Fernández	(Spain) Elche	Transfer	Free	
17 August 2017	(Spain) Rubén Yáñez	(Spain) Real Madrid	Loan	Free	

==== Out ====
Date	Player	To	Type	Fee	Ref
28 June 2017	(Spain) Luis Ruiz	(Spain) Lugo	Transfer	Free	
30 June 2017	(Spain) Ager Aketxe	(Spain) Athletic Bilbao	Loan return	Free	
30 June 2017	(Spain) Gorka Santamaría	(Spain) Athletic Bilbao	Loan return	Free	
30 June 2017	(Spain) Alfredo Ortuño	(Spain) Las Palmas	Loan return	Free	
30 June 2017	(Argentina) Gastón del Castillo	(Argentina) Independiente	Loan return	Free	
1 July 2017	(Spain) Iván Malón	TBD		Free	
10 July 2017	(Spain) Migue	(Spain) Sabadell	Transfer	Free	
10 July 2017	(Spain) Dani Güiza	(Spain) Sanluqueño	Transfer	Free	
17 July 2017	(Spain) Aridane	(Spain) Osasuna	Transfer	€1.5M	
21 July 2017	(Spain) Jesús Fernández	(Spain) Cultural Leonesa	Transfer	Free	
31 July 2017	(Spain) Carlos Calvo	(Spain) Recreativo	Transfer	Free	

== Competitions ==
=== Overall ===
Competition	Final position
Segunda División	9th
Copa del Rey	Round of 16

=== Liga ===
==== League table ====
Pos	Team	Pld	W	D	L	GF	GA	GD	Pts
7	Oviedo	42	18	11	13	54	48	+6	65 (Note: Numancia finished ahead of Oviedo on head-to-head goal difference: Oviedo 3–1 Numancia, Numancia 3–0 Oviedo)
8	Osasuna	42	16	16	10	44	34	+10	64 (Note: Osasuna finished ahead of Cádiz on head-to-head points: Cádiz 0–2 Osasuna, Osasuna 1–0 Cádiz)
9	Cádiz	42	16	16	10	42	29	+13	64
10	Granada	42	17	10	15	55	50	+5	61
11	Tenerife	42	15	14	13	58	50	+8	59

Source: La Liga
Rules for classification: 1) points; 2) head-to-head points; 3) head-to-head goal difference; 4) goal difference; 5) number of goals scored

==== Matches ====
19 August 2017 Match 1	Córdoba	1 - 2	Cádiz	Córdoba
20:30 CET	Marković 90+6'	Report	David Barral 1' (yellow card) 29'; Álvaro García 34'	Stadium: Estadio Nuevo Arcángel; Attendance: 11,528; Referee: (Spain) Aitor Gorostegui

27 August 2017 Match 2	Cádiz	0 - 0	Alcorcón	Cádiz
20:30 CET	Abdullah (yellow card) 18'; Dani Romera (yellow card) 72'; Jon Ander Garrido (yellow card) 90+3'	Report	Burgos (yellow card) 14'; Laure (yellow card) 45+1'; Jon Errasti (yellow card) 48'; Dorca (yellow card) 76'	Stadium: Estadio Ramón de Carranza; Attendance: 14,718; Referee: (Spain) Isidro Díaz de Mera

2 September 2017 Match 3	Lugo	0 - 1	Cádiz	Lugo
16:00 CET	Sergio Gil (yellow card) 49'; Luis Muñoz (yellow card) 85'; Luis Ruiz (yellow card) 90+3'	Report	Traoré (yellow card) 72'; David Barral 86' (pen.)	Stadium: Estadio Anxo Carro; Attendance: 3,026; Referee: (Spain) Daniel Ocón

8 September 2017 Match 4	Cádiz	2 - 0	Gimnàstic de Tarragona	Cádiz
21:00 CET	Brian Oliván (yellow card) 18'; David Barral 54'; Álvaro García 73'	Report	Suzuki (yellow card) 56'; Javi Jiménez (yellow card) 63'	Stadium: Estadio Ramón de Carranza; Attendance: 13,492; Referee: (Spain) Eduardo Prieto

17 September 2017 Match 5	Real Oviedo	1 - 0	Cádiz	Oviedo
18:00 CET	David Rocha (yellow card) 36'; Aarón Ñíguez (yellow card) 45'; Toché 64' (yellow card) 83'; Cotugno (yellow card) 90+2'	Report	David Toro (yellow card) 81'; Álex (yellow card) 90+3'; José Ángel Carrillo (yellow card) 90+4'	Stadium: Estadio Carlos Tartiere; Attendance: 15,141; Referee: (Spain) Oliver De La Fuente

24 September 2017 Match 6	Cádiz	0 - 0	Numancia	Cádiz
20:00 CET	David Barral (yellow card) 30' (yellow-red card); Javier Carpio (yellow card) 82'	Report	Alberto Escassi (yellow card) 58'; Pere Milla (yellow card) 65'; Unai Elgezabal (yellow card) 83'	Stadium: Estadio Ramón de Carranza; Attendance: 14,260; Referee: (Spain) David Pérez

30 September 2017 Match 7	Lorca FC	3 - 0	Cádiz	Lorca
20:00 CET	Jon Ander Garrido 4' (o.g.); Carlos Pomares (yellow card) 69'; Manuel 84'; Merentiel 90' (yellow card) 90+1'	Report	Jon Ander Garrido (yellow card) 24'; Brian Oliván (yellow card) 27'; Servando Sánchez (yellow card) 31'; Aitor García (yellow card) 43'	Stadium: Estadio Francisco Artés Carrasco; Attendance: 6,608; Referee: (Spain) Gorka Sagues

7 October 2017 Match 8	Cádiz	0 - 2	Osasuna	Cádiz
20:30 CET	Salvi (yellow card) 16'; Servando Sánchez (yellow card) 25'; Jon Ander Garrido (yellow card) 29'	Report	Sergio Herrera (yellow card) 15'; Fran Mérida (yellow card) 69'; Xisco 76'; de las Cuevas 88'	Stadium: Estadio Ramón de Carranza; Attendance: 13,160; Referee: (Spain) Guillermo Cuadra Fernández

11 October 2017 Match 9	Sevilla Atlético	0 - 0	Cádiz	Sevilla
17:00 CET	José Matos (yellow card) 58' (yellow-red card); Curro Sánchez (yellow card) 70'; Fede (yellow card) 70'	Report	Rober Correa (yellow card) 63'; Brian Oliván (yellow card) 70'; Álex (yellow card) 90+1'; Alberto Perea (yellow card) 90+3'	Stadium: Viejo Nervión; Attendance: 4,663; Referee: (Spain) Eduardo Prieto

14 October 2017 Match 10	Cádiz	2 - 2	Cultural Leonesa	Cádiz
11:00 CET	José Carrillo 13'; Ivan Gonzáles 30' (o.g.)	Report	Víctor Díaz (yellow card) 50'; Josep Señé 74'; Ivan Gonzáles (yellow card) 78'; Ariday Cabrera (yellow card) 84' (goal) 87'	Stadium: Estadio Ramón de Carranza; Attendance: 11,680; Referee: (Spain) Valentín Pizarro

21 October 2017 Match 11	Huesca	1 - 0	Cádiz	Huesca
11:00 CET	Lluís Sastre 12'; Jorge Pulido (yellow card) 58'; Álex Remiro (yellow card) 74'	Report	Rafidine Abdullah (yellow card) 26'; Álvaro García (yellow card) 39'; José Mari (yellow card) 90+2'	Stadium: Estadio El Alcoraz; Attendance: 3,536; Referee: (Spain) Juan Pulido

=== Copa del Rey ===
5 September 2017 Round 2	Cádiz	1 - 0	Almería	Cádiz
18:45	David Barral 23' (yellow card) 24'; Rober Correa (yellow card) 55'; Kecojević (yellow card) 79'	Report	Tino Costa (yellow card) 58'	Stadium: Estadio Ramón de Carranza; Attendance: 11,530; Referee: (Spain) Dámaso Arcediano

20 September 2017 Round 3	Cádiz	1 - 0	Osasuna	Cádiz
21:00	David Barral 27' (yellow card) 78'; Abdullah (yellow card) 65'; Aitor García (yellow card) 69'; José Ángel Carrillo (yellow card) 70'	Report	David García (yellow card) 12'; Aitor Buñuel (yellow card) 62'; Arzura (yellow card) 81'	Stadium: Estadio Ramón de Carranza; Attendance: 12,451; Referee: (Spain) Saúl Ais

24 October 2017 Last 32 First Leg	Cádiz	1 - 2	Real Betis	Cádiz
21:30	Álex 21'; David Barral (yellow card) 45'; Traoré (yellow card) 65'; Jon Ander Garrido (yellow card) 74'	Report	Sergio León 6' 54'; Boudebouz (yellow card) 49'	Stadium: Estadio Ramón de Carranza; Attendance: 14,977; Referee: (Spain) Javier Alberola

30 November 2017 Last 32 Second Leg	Real Betis	3 - 5 (5 - 6 agg.)	Cádiz	Seville
21:30	Boudebouz 8' (yellow card) 44'; Cristian Tello 24' 64'; Narváez (yellow card) 70'; Víctor Camarasa (yellow card) 88'	Report	David Barral 3'; Dani Romera 18' 41'; Aitor García 26' (pen.); Traoré (yellow card) 28'; Kecojević 78'	Stadium: Estadio Benito Villamarín; Attendance: 25,829; Referee: (Spain) Daniel Trujillo

3 January 2018 Last 16 First Leg	Cádiz	0 - 2	Sevilla	Cádiz
21:00	Villanueva (yellow card) 1'; López (yellow card) 30'; Aitor García (yellow card) 47'	Report	Kjær (yellow card) 2'; Nolito 9'; Jesús Navas 23'; Lenglet (yellow card) 39'	Stadium: Estadio Ramón de Carranza; Attendance: 17,692; Referee: (Spain) Antonio Mateu

11 January 2018 Last 16 Second Leg	Sevilla	2 - 1 (4 - 1 agg.)	Cádiz	Seville
19:30	Ben Yedder 31'; Correa 54'	Report	Brian Oliván (yellow card) 26'; Sergio González (yellow card) 74'; Álvaro García 86'	Stadium: Ramón Sánchez Pizjuán Stadium; Attendance: 23,510; Referee: (Spain) Ricardo de Burgos Bengoetxea
