= 2016–17 Cádiz CF season =

Cádiz CF
2016–17 season
- Chairman: Manuel Vizcaíno
- Manager: Álvaro Cervera
- Stadium: Carranza
- Segunda División: 5th
- Copa del Rey: Round of 16
Home colours	Away colours

The 2016–17 season is the 107th season in Cádiz CF ’s history.

== Squad ==
As of 1 February 2017

Note: Flags indicate national team as defined under FIFA eligibility rules; some limited exceptions apply. Players may hold more than one non-FIFA nationality.

No.	Pos.	Nation	Player
1	GK	(Spain) ESP	Alberto Cifuentes (2nd captain)
2	DF	(Spain) ESP	Javier Carpio
3	DF	(Spain) ESP	Servando (Captain)
4	DF	(Spain) ESP	Aridane Hernández
5	MF	(Spain) ESP	Jon Ander Garrido (3rd captain)
6	MF	(Spain) ESP	José Mari
7	MF	(Spain) ESP	Salvi
9	FW	(Spain) ESP	Dani Güiza (4th captain)
10	FW	(Spain) ESP	Gorka Santamaría (on loan from Athletic Bilbao)
11	MF	(Spain) ESP	Álvaro García
13	GK	(Spain) ESP	Jesús Fernández
14	DF	(Spain) ESP	Brian Oliván (on loan from Granada)
15	DF	(Spain) ESP	Luis Ruiz

No.	Pos.	Nation	Player
16	MF	(Azerbaijan) AZE	Eddy Israfilov
17	DF	(Senegal) SEN	Khalifa Sankaré
18	FW	(Spain) ESP	Rubén Cruz
19	FW	(Spain) ESP	Alfredo Ortuño (on loan from Las Palmas)
20	MF	(Spain) ESP	Nico Hidalgo (on loan from Juventus)
21	DF	(Spain) ESP	Migue
22	FW	(Spain) ESP	Jesús Imaz
23	MF	(Spain) ESP	Ager Aketxe (on loan from Athletic Bilbao)
24	MF	(Comoros) COM	Rafidine Abdullah
25	DF	(Spain) ESP	Iván Malón
26	MF	(Spain) ESP	Aitor García
27	GK	(Spain) ESP	Álex Lázaro
30	FW	(Argentina) ARG	Gastón del Castillo (on loan from Independiente)

== Competitions ==
=== Overall ===
Competition	Final position
Segunda División	5th
Copa del Rey	3rd round

=== Liga ===
==== League table ====
Pos	Team	Pld	W	D	L	GF	GA	GD	Pts	Promotion, qualification or relegation
3	Getafe (O, P)	42	18	14	10	55	43	+12	68	Qualification to promotion play-offs
4	Tenerife	42	16	18	8	50	37	+13	66	Qualification to promotion play-offs
5	Cádiz	42	16	16	10	55	40	+15	64	Qualification to promotion play-offs
6	Huesca	42	16	15	11	53	43	+10	63 (Note: Huesca finished ahead of Valladolid on head-to-head points: Valladolid 1–2 Huesca, Huesca 1–0 Valladolid)	Qualification to promotion play-offs
7	Valladolid	42	18	9	15	52	47	+5	63	

Source: La Liga
Rules for classification: 1) points; 2) head-to-head points; 3) head-to-head goal difference; 4) goal difference; 5) number of goals scored
(O) Play-off winners; (P) Promoted
