= Manu Vallejo =

Spanish footballer

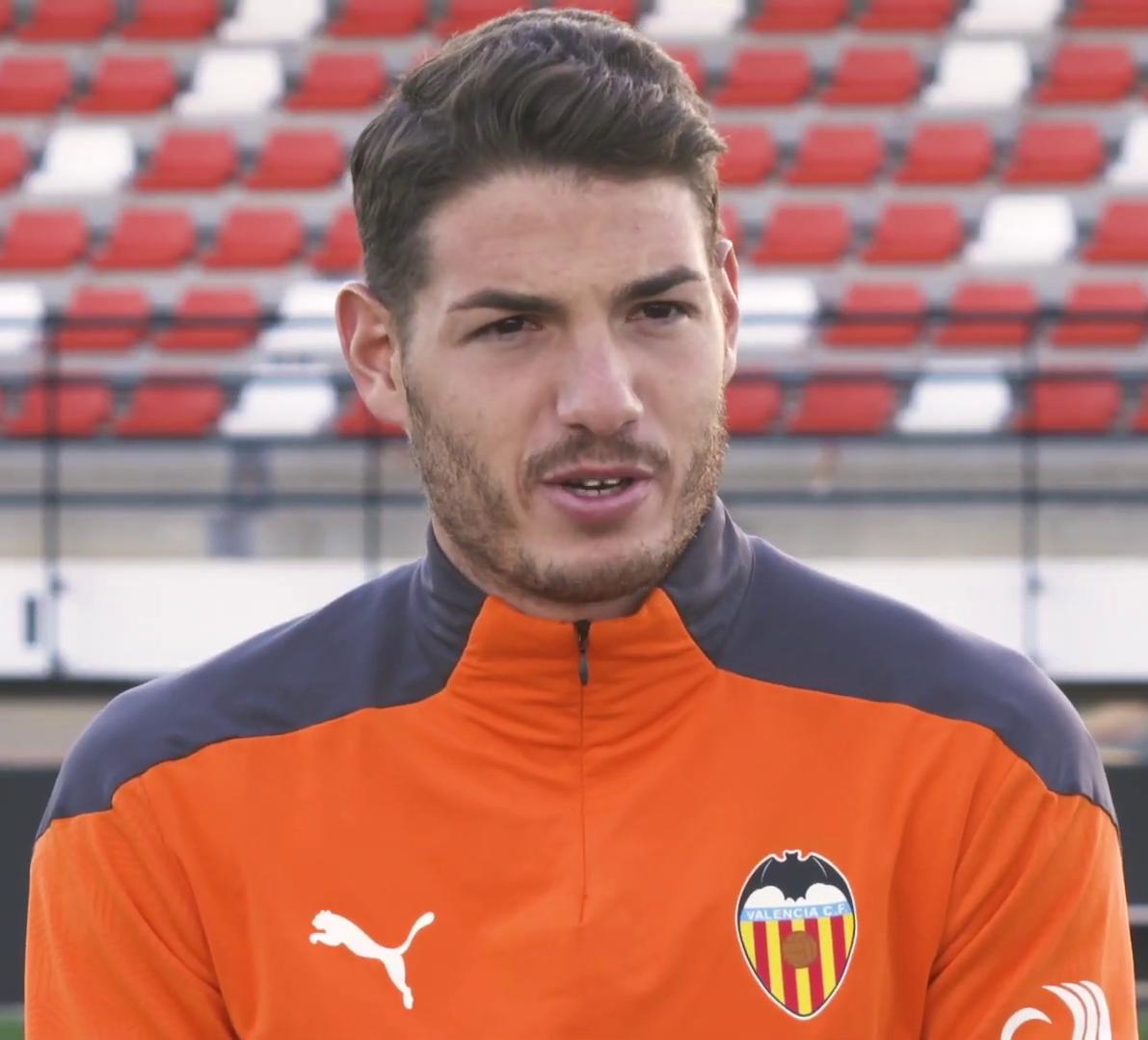
- Vallejo with Valencia in 2020

Personal information
- Full name: Manuel Javier Vallejo Galván
- Date of birth: 14 February 1997 (age 29)
- Place of birth: Chiclana, Spain
- Height: 1.67 m (5 ft 6 in)
- Positions: Winger; forward

Youth career
- Sancti-Petri
- 2012–2015: Cádiz

Senior career*
Years	Team	Apps	(Gls)
2015–2018	Cádiz B	94	(58)
2016–2019	Cádiz	25	(6)
2019–2022	Valencia	50	(7)
2019	→ Cádiz (loan)	9	(2)
2022	→ Alavés (loan)	11	(1)
2022–2024	Girona	7	(0)
2023	→ Oviedo (loan)	16	(4)
2023–2024	→ Zaragoza (loan)	29	(2)
2024–2025	Racing Ferrol	7	(0)
2025–2026	Ceuta	4	(0)

International career
2019	Spain U21	3	(0)
- * Club domestic league appearances and goals as of 28 November 2025

Manuel Javier Vallejo Galván (Spanish pronunciation: [ˈmanu βaˈʎexo]; born 14 February 1997) is a Spanish professional footballer who plays as winger or a forward.

== Club career ==
=== Cádiz ===
Born in Chiclana de la Frontera, Cádiz, Andalusia, Vallejo finished his formation with Cádiz CF. He made his senior debut with the reserves on 25 January 2015, coming on as a second-half substitute in a 2–1 Tercera División away loss against Atlético Sanluqueño CF.

Vallejo scored his first senior goal on 17 May 2015, netting his team's second in a 3–2 loss at CD Mairena. On 18 October, he scored a hat-trick in a 7–1 home routing of CD Roda, and finished the campaign with a career-best 23 goals.

Vallejo made his first team debut on 13 January 2016, playing the last 30 minutes in a 2–0 away loss against Celta de Vigo, for the season's Copa del Rey. He made his Segunda División debut on 28 October of the following year, replacing Salvi in a 0–0 home draw against Rayo Vallecano.

On 24 July 2018, Vallejo renewed his contract until 2021, and extended it to a further year on 22 August, being definitely promoted to the main squad. He scored his first professional goal on 12 September 2018, netting the winner in a 2–1 away defeat of CD Tenerife, for the season's Copa del Rey.

Vallejo scored his first league goal on 27 October 2018, netting the equalizer in a 2–1 away defeat of CD Lugo. On 20 December, he further extended his contract, signing until 2023.

=== Valencia ===
On 7 February 2019, La Liga side Valencia CF reached an agreement with Cádiz to sign Vallejo; the player remained on loan at the Amarillos until June. On 2 September 2019, due to the arrival of Thierry Correia, Vallejo changed his shirt number from 2 to 15. He made his debut in the top tier on 28 September 2019, coming on as a 69th-minute substitute for Maxi Gómez in 1–0 away victory against Athletic Bilbao, and his Champions League debut on 5 November 2019 when he came on as a 59th-minute substitute for Lee Kang-in in a 4–1 home thrashing of French side Lille.

Vallejo scored his first goal in the main category of Spanish football on 21 December 2019, netting a last-minute equalizer in 1–1 away draw against Real Valladolid.

==== Loan to Alavés ====
On 31 January 2022, Vallejo was loaned to fellow top-tier side Deportivo Alavés for the remainder of the season.

=== Girona ===
On 1 September 2022, Vallejo signed a three-year contract with Girona FC also in the top tier.

==== Loans to Oviedo and Zaragoza ====
On 27 January 2023, Vallejo joined Real Oviedo on loan until the end of the second division season. On 23 August, he moved to fellow league team Real Zaragoza also in a temporary deal.

=== Racing Ferrol ===
On 20 August 2024, just hours after terminating his contract with Girona, Vallejo joined Racing de Ferrol in the second division. He featured in just seven league matches, all as a substitute, as his side suffered relegation.

=== Ceuta ===
On 9 July 2025, Vallejo agreed to a one-year deal with AD Ceuta FC, newly promoted to the second level. The following 29 January, after just four league matches, he left.

== Personal life ==
Vallejo's father, Javi, is also a footballer.

== Career statistics ==
=== Club ===
As of 22 May 2021

Appearances and goals by club, season and competition
Club	Season	League			Cup		Continental		Other		Total	
Club	Season	Division	Apps	Goals	Apps	Goals	Apps	Goals	Apps	Goals	Apps	Goals
Cádiz	2015–16	Segunda División B	0	0	1	0	—		—		1	0
Cádiz	2016–17	Segunda División	0	0	0	0	—		—		0	0
Cádiz	2017–18	Segunda División	1	0	0	0	—		—		1	0
Cádiz	2018–19	Segunda División	33	8	2	2	—		—		35	10
Cádiz	Total		34	8	3	2	0	0	0	0	37	10
Valencia	2019–20	La Liga	10	2	0	0	2	0	0	0	12	2
Valencia	2020–21	La Liga	30	5	3	1	—		—		33	6
Valencia	Total		40	7	3	1	2	0	0	0	45	8
Career total			74	15	6	3	2	0	0	0	82	18

== Honours ==
Spain U21

- UEFA European Under-21 Championship: 2019
