= 2018–19 Cádiz CF season =

Cádiz CF
2018–19 season
- President: Manuel Vizcaíno
- Head coach: Álvaro Cervera
- Stadium: Ramón de Carranza
- Segunda División: 7th
- Copa del Rey: Round of 32
Home colours	Away colours

The 2018–19 Cádiz CF season was the club's 109th season in existence and its third consecutive season in the second division of Spanish football. In addition to the domestic league, Cádiz participated in this season's edition of the Copa del Rey. The season covered the period from 1 July 2018 to 30 June 2019.

== Players ==
=== First-team squad ===
As of 10 May 2019

Note: Flags indicate national team as defined under FIFA eligibility rules; some limited exceptions apply. Players may hold more than one non-FIFA nationality.

No.	Pos.	Nation	Player
1	GK	ESP	Alberto Cifuentes (2nd captain)
2	DF	ESP	Brian Oliván
3	DF	ESP	Servando (Captain)
4	DF	ESP	Rober Correa
5	MF	ESP	Jon Ander Garrido (3rd captain)
6	MF	ESP	José Mari
7	MF	ESP	Salvi Sánchez
8	MF	ESP	Álex Fernández
9	FW	SRB	Đorđe Jovanović
10	FW	ITA	Vincenzo Rennella
11	MF	ESP	Jairo Izquierdo (on loan from Girona)
12	DF	ESP	David Carmona
13	GK	ESP	David Gil
14	FW	SRB	Dejan Lekić

No.	Pos.	Nation	Player
15	DF	ARG	Marcos Mauro
16	DF	ESP	José Matos
17	FW	VEN	Darwin Machís (on loan from Udinese)
18	DF	URU	Pacha Espino
19	FW	ESP	Mario Barco
20	DF	ESP	Sergio Sánchez
21	FW	ESP	David Querol
22	DF	MNE	Ivan Kecojević
23	MF	ESP	Ager Aketxe
24	MF	ESP	Edu Ramos
25	DF	ESP	Fali (on loan from Gimnàstic)
29	FW	ESP	Manu Vallejo
—	DF	SRB	Aleksandar Pantić (on loan from Dynamo Kyiv)
—	MF	ESP	Juan Hernández (on loan from Celta Vigo)

=== Reserve team ===
Note: Flags indicate national team as defined under FIFA eligibility rules; some limited exceptions apply. Players may hold more than one non-FIFA nationality.

No.	Pos.	Nation	Player
26	GK	ESP	Cristian Arco
30	DF	ESP	Sergio González
31	MF	NGR	Israel Peter

No.	Pos.	Nation	Player
32	DF	NGR	Saturday Erimuya
33	MF	ESP	Javi Navarro

=== Out on loan ===
Note: Flags indicate national team as defined under FIFA eligibility rules; some limited exceptions apply. Players may hold more than one non-FIFA nationality.

No.	Pos.	Nation	Player
—	DF	ESP	Manu Sánchez (at Sevilla Atlético until 30 June 2019)
—	MF	FRA	Karim Azamoum (at Elche until 30 June 2019)
—	MF	ESP	Aitor García (at Sporting Gijón until 30 June 2019)
—	MF	ESP	Nico Hidalgo (at Racing Santander until 30 June 2019)

No.	Pos.	Nation	Player
—	MF	ESP	Alberto Perea (at Extremadura until 30 June 2019)
—	FW	ESP	Eneko Jauregi (at Atlético Levante until 30 June 2019)
—	FW	ESP	Dani Romera (at Rayo Majadahonda until 30 June 2019)

== Pre-season and friendlies ==
Win Draw Loss Fixtures

== Competitions ==
=== Overview ===
Competition	First match	Last match	Starting round	Record							
Competition	First match	Last match	Starting round	Pld	W	D	L	GF	GA	GD	Win %
Segunda División	12 September 2020	23 May 2021	Matchday 1	42	16	16	10	53	36	+17	38.10
Copa del Rey	2020		Round of 64	4	3	0	1	5	3	+2	75.00
Total				46	19	16	11	58	39	+19	41.30

Last updated: 8 June 2019
Source: Soccerway

=== Segunda División ===
==== League table ====
Pos	Team	Pld	W	D	L	GF	GA	GD	Pts	Promotion, qualification or relegation
5	Mallorca (O, P)	42	19	12	11	53	37	+16	69	Qualification to promotion play-offs
6	Deportivo La Coruña	42	17	17	8	50	32	+18	68	Qualification to promotion play-offs
7	Cádiz	42	16	16	10	53	36	+17	64	
8	Oviedo	42	17	12	13	48	48	0	63	
9	Sporting Gijón	42	16	13	13	43	38	+5	61	

Source: La Liga
Rules for classification: 1) points; 2) head-to-head points; 3) head-to-head goal difference; 4) goal difference; 5) number of goals scored
(O) Play-off winners; (P) Promoted

==== Results summary ====
Overall								Home						Away					
Pld	W	D	L	GF	GA	GD	Pts	W	D	L	GF	GA	GD	W	D	L	GF	GA	GD
0	0	0	0	0	0	0	0	0	0	0	0	0	0	0	0	0	0	0	0

Last updated: 8 June 2019.
Source: LaLiga 1|2|3

==== Results by round ====
Round	1	2	3	4	5	6	7	8	9	10	11	12	13	14	15	16	17	18	19	20	21	22	23	24	25	26	27	28	29	30	31	32	33	34	35	36	37	38	39	40	41	42
Ground																																										
Result	W	D	D	L	D	L	L	D	L	D	W	W	W	W	W	W	W	L	W	L	D	D	D	L	W	W	W	W	L	D	D	W	D	W	W	D	D	D	D	D	L	L
Position	4	6	9	11	13	16	17	18	20	20	19	12	9	9	7	7	6	6	6	7	7	7	7	9	8	7	6	6	6	7	7	6	7	4	4	5	5	6	6	6	7	7

Updated to match(es) played on 8 June 2019. Source: LaLiga 1|2|3
A = Away; H = Home; W = Win; D = Draw; L = Loss

==== Matches ====
The league fixtures were announced on 24 July 2018.

17 August 2018 1	Cádiz	1–0	Almería
20:00 CEST (UTC+2)		Report		Referee: Daniel Jesús Trujillo Suárez

25 August 2018 2	Numancia	1–1	Cádiz
19:00 CEST (UTC+2)		Report		Referee: Iñaki Vicandi Garrido

1 September 2018 3	Cádiz	1–1	Real Oviedo
19:00 CEST (UTC+2)		Report		Referee: Dámaso Arcediano Monescillo

7 September 2018 4	Mallorca	1–0	Cádiz
21:00 CEST (UTC+2)		Report		Referee: Isidro Díaz de Mera Escuderos

17 September 2018 5	Albacete	1–1	Cádiz
20:00 CEST (UTC+2)		Report		Referee: César Soto Grado

23 September 2018 6	Cádiz	0–2	Alcorcón
20:00 CEST (UTC+2)		Report		Referee: José Antonio López Toca

29 September 2018 7	Tenerife	1–0	Cádiz
20:30 CEST (UTC+2)		Report		Referee: Aitor Gorostegui Fernández-Ortega

7 October 2018 8	Cádiz	1–1	Gimnàstic
20:00 CEST (UTC+2)		Report		Referee: Saúl Ais Reig

12 October 2018 9	Extremadura	2–1	Cádiz
18:00 CEST (UTC+2)		Report		Referee: Rubén Ávalos Barrera

21 October 2018 10	Cádiz	0–0	Sporting Gijón
20:30 CEST (UTC+2)		Report		Referee: César Soto Grado

27 October 2018 11	Lugo	1–2	Cádiz
20:30 CEST (UTC+2)		Report		Referee: Daniel Ocón Arráiz

4 November 2018 12	Cádiz	5–1	Elche
12:00 CEST (UTC+2)		Report		Referee: Gorka Sagués Oscoz

10 November 2018 13	Cádiz	2–0	Reus
16:00 CEST (UTC+2)		Report		Referee: Valentín Pizarro Gómez

18 November 2018 14	Córdoba	1–3	Cádiz
16:00 CEST (UTC+2)		Report		Referee: David Pérez Pallas

24 November 2018 15	Cádiz	4–1	Las Palmas
20:30 CEST (UTC+2)		Report		Referee: Óliver de la Fuente Ramos

30 November 2018 16	Real Zaragoza	0–1	Cádiz
21:00 CEST (UTC+2)		Report		Referee: Víctor Areces Franco

9 December 2018 17	Cádiz	1–0	Rayo Majadahonda
16:00 CEST (UTC+2)		Report		Referee: Daniel Ocón Arráiz

14 December 2018 18	Málaga	1–0	Cádiz
21:00 CEST (UTC+2)		Report		Referee: Daniel Jesús Trujillo Suárez

22 December 2018 19	Cádiz	3–0	Deportivo La Coruña
20:45 CEST (UTC+2)		Report		Referee: Isidro Díaz de Mera Escuderos

6 January 2019 20	Osasuna	2–1	Cádiz
18:00 CEST (UTC+2)		Report		Referee: Álvaro Moreno Aragón

11 January 2019 21	Cádiz	0–0	Granada
21:00 CEST (UTC+2)		Report		Referee: Juan Luis Pulido Santana

19 January 2019 22	Almería	0–0	Cádiz
16:00 CEST (UTC+2)		Report		Referee: José Antonio López Toca

26 January 2019 23	Cádiz	1–1	Mallorca
20:30 CEST (UTC+2)		Report		Referee: Dámaso Arcediano Monescillo

3 February 2019 24	Real Oviedo	2–1	Cádiz
16:00 CEST (UTC+2)		Report		Referee: Gorka Sagués Oscoz

10 February 2019 25	Alcorcón	1–2	Cádiz
12:00 CEST (UTC+2)		Report		Referee: Rubén Ávalos Barrera

16 February 2019 26	Cádiz	2–0	Tenerife
20:30 CEST (UTC+2)		Report		Referee: Iñaki Vicandi Garrido

23 February 2019 27	Gimnàstic	2–3	Cádiz
18:00 CEST (UTC+2)				Referee: Álvaro Moreno Aragón

2 March 2019 28	Cádiz	1–0	Albacete
16:00 CEST (UTC+2)		Report		Referee: Javier Iglesias Villanueva

9 March 2019 29	Elche	1–0	Cádiz
20:30 CEST (UTC+2)		Report		Referee: César Soto Grado

16 March 2019 30	Cádiz	1–1	Lugo
18:00 CEST (UTC+2)		Report		Referee: José Antonio López Toca

24 March 2019 31	Cádiz	1–1	Córdoba
18:00 CEST (UTC+2)		Report		Referee: David Pérez Pallas

29 March 2019 32	Reus	0–1	Cádiz
21:00 CEST (UTC+2)		Report

8 April 2019 33	Cádiz	3–3	Real Zaragoza
21:00 CEST (UTC+2)		Report		Referee: Isidro Díaz de Mera Escuderos

14 April 2019 34	Las Palmas	0–3	Cádiz
20:00 CEST (UTC+2)		Report		Referee: Santiago Varón Aceitón

21 April 2019 35	Cádiz	2–1	Numancia
12:00 CEST (UTC+2)		Report		Referee: Álvaro Moreno Aragón

28 April 2019 36	Rayo Majadahonda	1–1	Cádiz
12:00 CEST (UTC+2)		Report		Referee: Daniel Ocón Arráiz

6 May 2019 37	Cádiz	1–1	Málaga
21:00 CEST (UTC+2)		Report		Referee: Aitor Gorostegui Fernández-Ortega

12 May 2019 38	Deportivo La Coruña	1–1	Cádiz
16:00 CEST (UTC+2)		Report		Referee: César Soto Grado

19 May 2019 39	Cádiz	0–0	Osasuna
18:00 CEST (UTC+2)		Report		Referee: Dámaso Arcediano Monescillo

26 May 2019 40	Granada	1–1	Cádiz
19:00 CEST (UTC+2)		Report		Referee: Juan Luis Pulido Santana

4 June 2019 41	Cádiz	0–1	Extremadura
21:00 CEST (UTC+2)		Report		Referee: Óliver de la Fuente Ramos

8 June 2019 42	Sporting Gijón	1–0	Cádiz
20:30 CEST (UTC+2)		Report		Referee: Daniel Ocón Arráiz

=== Copa del Rey ===
12 September 2018 Second round	Tenerife	1–2	Cádiz	Santa Cruz de Tenerife
22:00 CEST (UTC+2)				Stadium: Heliodoro Rodríguez López; Attendance: 8,777; Referee: Óliver de la Fuente Ramos

17 October 2018 Third round	Real Zaragoza	0–1	Cádiz	Zaragoza
21:00 CEST (UTC+2)				Stadium: La Romareda; Attendance: 12,946

1 November 2018 R32 First leg	Cádiz	2–1	Espanyol	Cádiz
18:30 CEST (UTC+2)				Stadium: Ramón de Carranza; Attendance: 11,830; Referee: Juan Martínez Munuera

4 December 2018 R32 Second leg	Espanyol	1–0 (2–2 (a) agg.)	Cádiz	Cornellà de Llobregat
21:30 CEST (UTC+2)				Stadium: RCDE Stadium; Attendance: 12,560; Referee: Ricardo de Burgos Bengoetxea
