= Jon Ander Garrido =

Spanish association football player

Personal information
- Full name: Jon Ander Garrido Moracia
- Date of birth: 9 October 1989 (age 37)
- Place of birth: Bilbao, Spain
- Height: 1.85 m (6 ft 1 in)
- Position: Defensive midfielder

Youth career
- Getxo

Senior career*
Years	Team	Apps	(Gls)
2008–2010	Getxo		
2010–2014	Barakaldo	96	(9)
2014–2015	Granada	0	(0)
2014–2015	→ Cádiz (loan)	49	(2)
2015–2023	Cádiz	134	(5)
2016	→ Racing Ferrol (loan)	15	(0)
2022	→ Mirandés (loan)	13	(1)
Total		315	(17)
- * Club domestic league appearances and goals

Jon Ander Garrido Moracia (born 9 October 1989) is a Spanish retired footballer who played as a defensive midfielder.

== Club career ==
Born in Bilbao, Biscay, Garrido made his senior debut for CD Getxo in 2008, in the regional levels. In the 2010 summer he moved straight to Segunda División B, signing for Barakaldo CF.

On 21 January 2014, Garrido joined La Liga side Granada CF, but was immediately loaned to Cádiz CF also in the third level. On 6 July, his loan was extended for a further year.

On 29 July 2015, Garrido signed a permanent two-year deal with the Yellow Submarine. The following 22 January, after featuring sparingly, he was loaned to fellow third division club Racing de Ferrol, until June.

Garrido returned to Cádiz after his loan expired, and made his professional debut on 19 August 2016 by starting in a 1–1 away draw against UD Almería. On 28 July 2018, after becoming an undisputed starter under Álvaro Cervera, he renewed his contract until 2020. On 30 October 2019, he prolonged his contract with the Andalusian club until 30 June 2023.

Garrido achieved promotion to the top tier in 2020, and made his debut in the category on 1 October of that year, starting in a 1–0 away win over Athletic Bilbao. In August 2021, he suffered a knee injury, being sidelined for the remainder of the year.

On 27 January 2022, Garrido was loaned to CD Mirandés in the second division for the remainder of the season. Back to Cádiz in July, he again suffered a knee injury which kept him out for the entire 2022–23 campaign.

On 8 June 2023, Garrido announced his retirement from professional football at the age of 33.

== Career statistics ==
=== Club ===
As of 1 July 2022

Appearances and goals by club, season and competition
Club	Season	League			National Cup		Other		Total	
Club	Season	Division	Apps	Goals	Apps	Goals	Apps	Goals	Apps	Goals
Barakaldo	2010–11	Segunda División B	18	0	—		—		18	0
Barakaldo	2011–12	Tercera División	?	?	—		—		?	?
Barakaldo	2012–13	Segunda División B	31	6	—		—		31	6
Barakaldo	2013–14	Segunda División B	19	2	1	0	—		20	2
Barakaldo	Total		68+	8+	1	0	0	0	69+	8+
Cádiz (loan)	2013–14	Segunda División B	13	0	—		2 (Note: Appearances in 2014 Segunda División B play-offs)	0	15	0
Cádiz (loan)	2014–15	Segunda División B	29	2	5	0	6 (Note: Appearances in 2015 Segunda División B play-offs)	0	40	2
Cádiz	2015–16	Segunda División B	14	0	3	0	—		17	0
Cádiz	2016–17	Segunda División	30	1	1	0	2 (Note: Appearances in 2017 Segunda División play-offs)	0	33	1
Cádiz	2017–18	Segunda División	36	2	5	0	—		41	2
Cádiz	2018–19	Segunda División	22	1	1	0	—		23	1
Cádiz	2019–20	Segunda División	24	1	2	0	—		26	1
Cádiz	2020–21	La Liga	20	0	1	1	—		20	1
Cádiz	2021–22	La Liga	0	0	0	0	—		0	0
Cádiz	Total		188	7	18	1	10	0	216	8
Racing Ferrol (loan)	2015–16	Segunda División B	15	0	—		—		15	0
Mirandés	2021–22	Segunda División	13	1	0	0	—		13	1
Career total			284	16	19	1	10	0	313	17
