= David Gil (footballer) =

Spanish footballer

Personal information
- Full name: David Gil Mohedano
- Date of birth: 11 January 1994 (age 32)
- Place of birth: Madrid, Spain
- Height: 1.86 m (6 ft 1 in)
- Position: Goalkeeper

Team information
- Current team: Cádiz
- Number: 1

Youth career
- Getafe
- 2006–2012: Atlético Madrid

Senior career*
Years	Team	Apps	(Gls)
2012–2013	Atlético Madrid C	10	(0)
2013–2015	Atlético Madrid B	44	(0)
2015–2017	Getafe B	44	(0)
2017–2018	Cádiz B	35	(0)
2018–	Cádiz	61	(0)
- * Club domestic league appearances and goals as of 9 June 2026

David Gil Mohedano (born 11 January 1994) is a Spanish professional footballer who plays for Cádiz CF as a goalkeeper.

== Career ==
Born in Madrid, Gil was an Atlético Madrid youth graduate. He made his senior debut in the 2012–13 season, playing ten games for the C-team in Tercera División. After being promoted to the reserves in 2013, he also featured in the first team's pre-season in July 2014.

On 15 July 2015 Gil moved to another reserve team, Getafe CF B in Segunda División B. On 17 July 2017, he joined Cádiz CF, being initially assigned to the B-team in the fourth division.

On 24 August 2018, Gil signed a contract extension until 2020 and was definitely promoted to the Andalusians' main squad in Segunda División. He made his professional debut on 12 September, starting in a 2–1 away win against CD Tenerife, for the season's Copa del Rey.

Gil made his Segunda División debut on 17 September 2019, starting in a 3–0 loss at AD Alcorcón, and spent the campaign as a backup to longtime incumbent Alberto Cifuentes as his side achieved promotion to La Liga. He made his debut in the top tier on 12 September 2020, starting in a 2–0 home loss against CA Osasuna.

== Career statistics ==
As of match played 31 May 2026

Appearances and goals by club, season and competition
Club	Season	League			Cup		Continental		Other		Total	
Club	Season	Division	Apps	Goals	Apps	Goals	Apps	Goals	Apps	Goals	Apps	Goals
Atlético Madrid B	2012–13	Segunda División B	5	0	—		—		—		5	0
Atlético Madrid B	2013–14	Segunda División B	15	0	—		—		1 (Note: Appearances in Segunda División B play-offs)	0	16	0
Atlético Madrid B	2014–15	Segunda División B	22	0	—		—		—		22	0
Atlético Madrid B	Total		42	0	—		—		1	0	43	0
Atlético Madrid	2013–14	La Liga	0	0	0	0	0	0	0	0	0	0
Getafe B	2015–16	Segunda División B	23	0	—		—		—		23	0
Getafe	2016–17	Segunda División	0	0	0	0	—		—		0	0
Cádiz B	2017–18	Segunda División B	0	0	—		—		6	0	6	0
Cádiz	2017–18	Segunda División	0	0	0	0	—		—		0	0
Cádiz	2018–18	Segunda División	0	0	4	0	—		—		4	0
Cádiz	2019–20	Segunda División	4	0	2	0	—		—		6	0
Cádiz	2020–21	La Liga	4	0	3	0	—		—		7	0
Cádiz	2021–22	La Liga	0	0	5	0	—		—		5	0
Cádiz	2022–23	La Liga	4	0	1	0	—		—		5	0
Cádiz	2023–24	La Liga	5	0	1	0	—		—		6	0
Cádiz	2024–25	Segunda División	36	0	0	0	—		—		36	0
Cádiz	2025–26	Segunda División	8	0	2	0	—		—		10	0
Cádiz	Total		61	0	18	0	—		—		79	0
Career total			126	0	18	0	0	0	7	0	151	0
