= Alberto Perea =

Spanish footballer (born 1990)

Personal information
- Full name: Alberto Álvaro Perea Correoso
- Date of birth: 19 December 1990 (age 35)
- Place of birth: Albacete, Spain
- Height: 1.77 m (5 ft 10 in)
- Position: Winger

Youth career
- 2005–2009: Albacete

Senior career*
Years	Team	Apps	(Gls)
2009	Albacete	1	(0)
2009–2011	Atlético Madrid B	48	(5)
2011–2013	Rayo Vallecano B	40	(12)
2012–2014	Rayo Vallecano	13	(1)
2014–2015	Llagostera	20	(1)
2015–2016	Olot	15	(9)
2016–2017	Barcelona B	49	(12)
2017–2022	Cádiz	108	(9)
2019	→ Extremadura (loan)	17	(1)
2022–2024	Granada	23	(2)
2024	Anorthosis	11	(0)
- * Club domestic league appearances and goals as of 18:41, 6 May 2024 (UTC)

Alberto Álvaro Perea Correoso (born 19 December 1990) is a Spanish professional footballer who plays as a winger.

== Club career ==
Born in Albacete, Castilla–La Mancha, Perea was a product of hometown Albacete Balompié's youth ranks. He made his debut with the first team on 17 January 2009, coming on as a second-half substitute in a 0–3 home defeat to Hércules CF in the Segunda División. On 21 May he was transferred to Atlético Madrid, spending his first season with the Colchoneros' B team in the Segunda División B.

Good form earned Perea a promotion to the first team for the 2010–11 pre-season, scoring in his first appearance with the main squad against Madrid neighbours RSD Alcalá (8–2 win), and against Real Betis (2–1) the following week. On 27 October 2010 he played his first official game for Atlético, replacing Raúl García in a 5–0 victory at Universidad de Las Palmas CF in the round of 32 of the Copa del Rey. Two weeks later, as everything was already decided, he started in the second match, a 1–1 draw at the Vicente Calderón Stadium.

On 12 July 2011, Perea transferred to another side in the Community of Madrid, signing a three-year deal with Rayo Vallecano, recently returned to La Liga, and initially being assigned to the B side in division three. Benefitting from several injuries to the main squad, he made his debut in the top flight on 22 January 2012, playing ten minutes in a 1–0 home loss against RCD Mallorca.

Perea alternated between the second and third tiers in the following years, representing UE Llagostera, UE Olot and FC Barcelona B. On 17 July 2017, the free agent signed a three-year contract with Cádiz CF in the former tournament.

On 1 February 2019, Perea was loaned to Extremadura UD for six months. He renewed his link at the Estadio Ramón de Carranza until 30 June 2023 later the same year, commenting on the new deal by making a nod to club legend Mágico González: "Carranza is a land of magicians, and I want to offer my magic until 2023".

On 1 September 2022, Perea terminated his contract with Cádiz, and signed a one-year deal with second-division Granada CF hours later, extendable for a further season if certain unspecified sporting objectives were met. In January 2024, he left the latter by mutual agreement.

Perea joined Cypriot First Division club Anorthosis Famagusta FC on a one-and-a-half-year contract on 15 January 2024.

== Career statistics ==
As of match played 21 May 2021

Appearances and goals by club, season and competition
Club	Season	League			National cup		Other		Total	
Club	Season	Division	Apps	Goals	Apps	Goals	Apps	Goals	Apps	Goals
Albacete	2008–09	Segunda División	1	0	0	0	—		1	0
Atlético Madrid B	2009–10	Segunda División B	25	5	—		—		23	5
Atlético Madrid B	2010–11	Segunda División B	23	0	—		—		23	0
Atlético Madrid B	Total		48	5	0	0	0	0	48	5
Atlético Madrid	2010–11	La Liga	0	0	3	0	—		3	0
Rayo Vallecano B	2011–12	Segunda División B	20	5	—		—		20	5
Rayo Vallecano B	2012–13	Segunda División B	20	7	—		—		20	7
Rayo Vallecano B	Total		40	12	0	0	0	0	40	12
Rayo Vallecano	2011–12	La Liga	1	0	0	0	—		1	0
Rayo Vallecano	2012–13	La Liga	4	0	0	0	—		4	0
Rayo Vallecano	2013–14	La Liga	8	1	2	0	—		10	1
Rayo Vallecano	Total		13	1	2	0	0	0	15	1
Llagostera	2014–15	Segunda División	20	1	0	0	—		20	1
Olot	2015–16	Segunda División B	15	9	0	0	—		15	9
Barcelona B	2015–16	Segunda División B	16	2	—		—		16	2
Barcelona B	2016–17	Segunda División B	33	10	—		5 (Note: Appearances in Segunda División B play-offs)	0	38	10
Barcelona B	Total		49	12	0	0	5	0	54	12
Cádiz	2017–18	Segunda División	22	2	1	0	—		23	2
Cádiz	2018–19	Segunda División	7	0	4	0	—		11	0
Cádiz	2019–20	Segunda División	33	5	0	0	—		33	5
Cádiz	2020–21	La Liga	27	2	2	0	—		29	2
Cádiz	Total		89	9	7	0	0	0	96	9
Extremadura (loan)	2018–19	Segunda División	17	1	0	0	—		17	1
Career total			292	50	12	0	5	0	309	50

== Honours ==
Granada

- Segunda División: 2022–23
