= Álex Fernández (footballer, born 1992) =

Spanish footballer

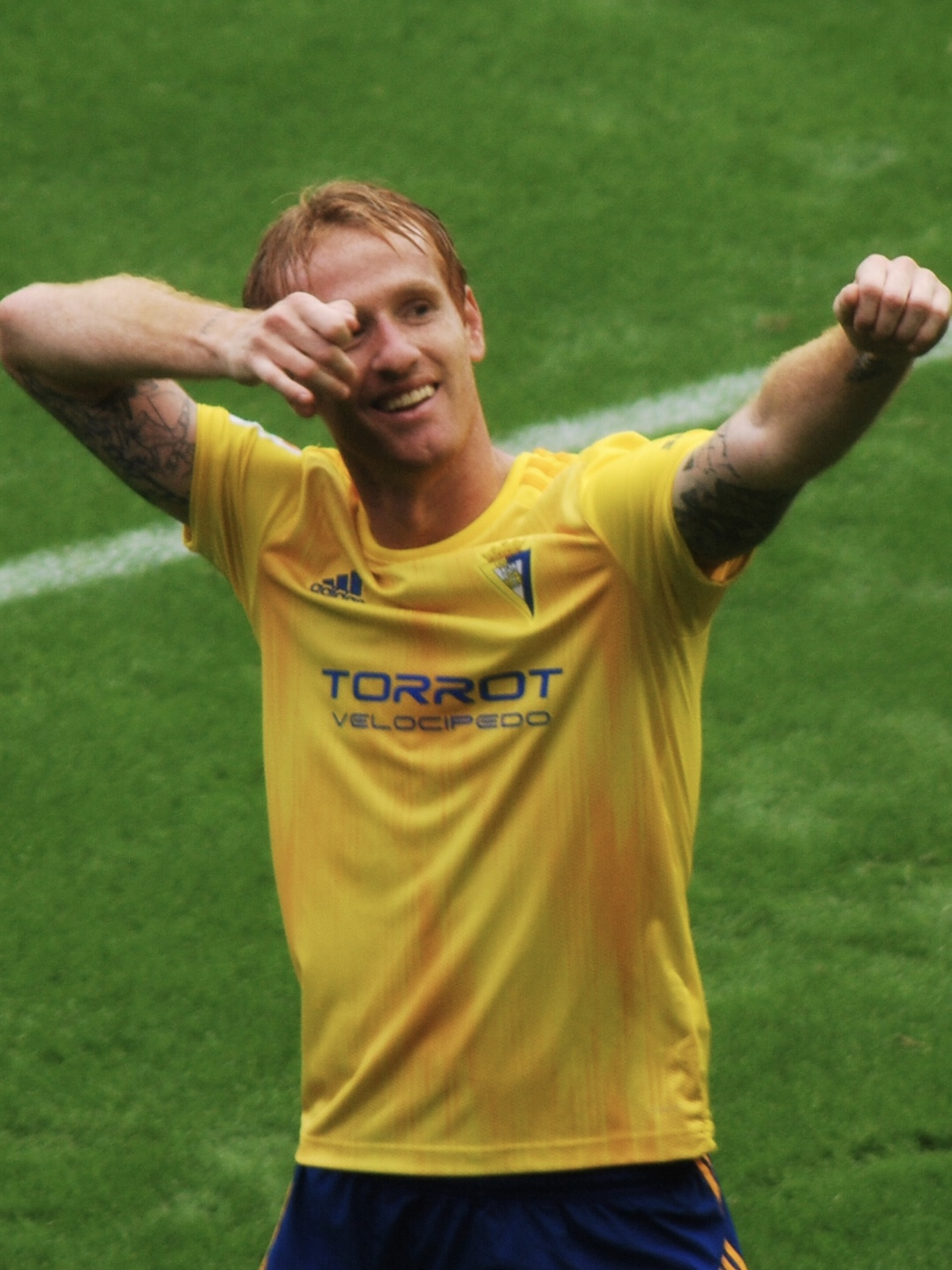
- Fernández with Cádiz in 2019

Personal information
- Full name: Alejandro Fernández Iglesias
- Date of birth: 15 October 1992 (age 34)
- Place of birth: Madrid, Spain
- Height: 1.82 m (6 ft 0 in)
- Position: Midfielder

Team information
- Current team: Dibba Al-Hisn

Youth career
- 2000–2003: Complutense
- 2003–2005: Alcalá
- 2005–2010: Real Madrid

Senior career*
Years	Team	Apps	(Gls)
2010–2013	Real Madrid B	99	(6)
2011	Real Madrid	1	(0)
2013–2016	Espanyol	29	(0)
2015	→ Rijeka (loan)	9	(2)
2015–2016	→ Reading (loan)	8	(0)
2016–2017	Elche	34	(3)
2017–2026	Cádiz	292	(40)
2026–	Dibba Al-Hisn	2	(2)

International career
2008–2009	Spain U17	14	(2)
2010	Spain U18	2	(0)
2010–2011	Spain U19	10	(0)
2011	Spain U20	1	(0)
- * Club domestic league appearances and goals as of 22:06, 24 September 2026 (UTC)

Alejandro "Álex" Fernández Iglesias (born 15 October 1992) is a Spanish professional footballer who plays as a midfielder for UAE First Division League club Dibba Al-Hisn.

== Club career ==
=== Real Madrid ===
Born in Madrid, Fernández joined Real Madrid's youth system from neighbouring RSD Alcalá, aged 12. In 2010, he started appearing with Real Madrid Castilla in Segunda División B and, in July of that year, he was called by first-team coach José Mourinho to a preseason tour in the United States. He made his unofficial debut on 5 August in a friendly against Club América (3–2 win), with his brother Nacho also making his first appearance that day.

Fernández made his league debut with the B side on 29 August 2010, playing 87 minutes in a 3–2 home win against Coruxo FC. On 3 October he scored his first goal, contributing to the 3–0 home victory over AD Cerro de Reyes. He finished his first season with 32 games and two goals, as the team fell short in the promotion playoffs.

On 6 March 2011, Fernández made his La Liga debut, playing the last minute of a 3–1 defeat of Racing de Santander. He contributed 35 appearances in the 2011–12 campaign – playoffs included – with Castilla returning to the second tier after five years.

=== Espanyol ===
Fernández left Real Madrid in August 2013, by mutual consent. He signed shortly after with RCD Espanyol in the top level, appearing in 30 competitive matches in his first year but starting in only five.

On 28 January 2015, Espanyol loaned Fernández to HNK Rijeka until the end of the season. On 18 August, he joined Championship club Reading on loan, with a view to a permanent move at the end of the campaign. He scored his first goal for them on 19 January 2016, in a 5–2 home win against Huddersfield Town in the third round of the FA Cup.

=== Elche and Cádiz ===
On 31 August 2016, shortly after terminating his contract with Espanyol, due to expire the following year, Fernández signed for Elche CF. The following 7 August, after suffering relegation, he agreed to a two-year deal at fellow Segunda División team Cádiz CF.

With a total of 11 goals, Fernández was his team's top scorer in 2019. He scored 13 during the season from 41 appearances, in a return to the top flight as runners-up.

In 2020–21, Fernández contributed four goals – bettered in the team only by Álvaro Negredo's eight – as the Andalusian side stayed up in 12th place; he missed the final two months with a right knee injury. On 6 June 2022, he extended his contract until 2025.

== Personal life ==
Fernández's older brother, Nacho, is also a footballer. A defender, he also graduated from Real Madrid's academy but remained there while Álex moved on. Their physical appearance is quite dissimilar, owing to Álex's red hair.

== Career statistics ==
As of match played 3 May 2023

Appearances and goals by club, season and competition
Club	Season	League			National Cup		League Cup		Continental		Other		Total	
Club	Season	Division	Apps	Goals	Apps	Goals	Apps	Goals	Apps	Goals	Apps	Goals	Apps	Goals
Real Madrid B	2010–11	Segunda División B	32	2	–		–		–		–		32	2
Real Madrid B	2011–12	Segunda División B	35	1	–		–		–		–		35	1
Real Madrid B	2012–13	Segunda División	32	3	–		–		–		–		32	3
Real Madrid B	Total		99	6	0	0	0	0	0	0	0	0	99	6
Real Madrid	2010–11	La Liga	1	0	0	0	–		0	0	–		1	0
Real Madrid	2012–13	La Liga	0	0	1	0	–		0	0	–		1	0
Real Madrid	Total		1	0	1	0	0	0	0	0	0	0	2	0
Espanyol	2013–14	La Liga	24	0	6	0	–		–		–		30	0
Espanyol	2014–15	La Liga	5	0	2	0	–		–		–		7	0
Espanyol	Total		29	0	8	0	0	0	0	0	0	0	37	0
Rijeka (loan)	2014–15	1. HNL	9	2	2	0	–		0	0	–		11	2
Reading (loan)	2015–16	Championship	8	0	1	1	1	0	–		–		10	1
Elche	2016–17	Segunda División	34	3	2	0	–		–		–		36	3
Cádiz	2017–18	Segunda División	37	3	5	1	–		–		–		42	4
Cádiz	2018–19	Segunda División	40	6	3	0	–		–		–		43	6
Cádiz	2019–20	Segunda División	41	13	1	0	–		–		–		42	13
Cádiz	2020–21	La Liga	25	4	1	0	–		–		–		26	4
Cádiz	2021–22	La Liga	32	3	3	0	–		–		–		35	3
Cádiz	2022–23	La Liga	28	3	0	0	–		–		–		28	3
Cádiz	Total		203	32	13	1	0	0	0	0	0	0	216	33
Career total			383	43	27	2	1	0	0	0	0	0	411	45

== Honours ==
Real Madrid Castilla

- Segunda División B: 2011–12

Spain U19

- UEFA European Under-19 Championship: 2011

Individual

- UEFA European Under-19 Championship Golden Player: 2011
