= José Mari (footballer, born 1987) =

Spanish footballer

Personal information
- Full name: José María Martín Bejarano-Serrano
- Date of birth: 6 December 1987 (age 38)
- Place of birth: Rota, Spain
- Height: 1.80 m (5 ft 11 in)
- Position: Defensive midfielder

Youth career
- Roteña

Senior career*
| Years | Team | Apps | (Gls) |
| 2006–2007 | Roteña | 21 | (3) |
| 2007–2009 | Sanluqueño | 56 | (0) |
| 2009–2010 | Murcia B | 28 | (0) |
| 2010–2012 | Jaén | 67 | (2) |
| 2012–2014 | Zaragoza | 38 | (0) |
| 2014 | Colorado Rapids | 20 | (4) |
| 2015–2016 | Levante | 26 | (0) |
| 2016–2024 | Cádiz | 157 | (3) |
| Total | | 413 | (16) |
- * Club domestic league appearances and goals

José María Martín Bejarano-Serrano (born 6 December 1987), commonly known as José Mari, is a Spanish former professional footballer who played as a defensive midfielder.

He spent most of his career in the lower leagues of his country, appearing in La Liga for Zaragoza, Levante and Cádiz while totalling 104 games and one goal, and also spent a season in the United States with the Colorado Rapids.

== Club career ==
=== Early years and Zaragoza ===
Born in Rota, Andalusia, José Mari played amateur football until the age of nearly 22, representing UD Roteña and Atlético Sanluqueño CF. In the summer of 2009 he joined Real Murcia Imperial of Segunda División B, being relegated in his only season.

Subsequently, José Mari stayed in that level, spending two years at Real Jaén. In summer 2012 he moved straight to La Liga, signing for two years with Real Zaragoza and initially being assigned to the reserves after the preseason was over; however, he managed to convince first-team coach Manolo Jiménez and, in August, was definitely promoted.

José Mari made his professional – and top flight – debut on 20 August 2012, playing the second half in a 1–0 home loss against Real Valladolid. He finished the campaign with 27 matches in all competitions, scoring once in the Copa del Rey, but the Aragonese were eventually relegated.

On 6 February 2014, it was announced that José Mari and Zaragoza had agreed to mutually terminate his contract. He netted his first league goal for the club in his last appearance, a 2–1 home victory over Córdoba CF on 8 December of the previous year.

=== Colorado Rapids ===
On 11 February 2014, José Mari joined the Colorado Rapids of Major League Soccer, for a preseason trial. The team announced early in the following month that he had been signed to the active roster, and would be eligible to play pending receipt of his U.S. P-1 work visa and an international transfer certificate. He made his debut for the club as the season opened on 15 March, playing the full 90 minutes in a 1–1 away draw against the New York Red Bulls. A week later, in his first match at Dick's Sporting Goods Park, he was sent off for a second yellow card in the last minute of a 2–0 defeat of the Portland Timbers.

José Mari scored his first goals for the Rapids on 5 April 2014, as they came from behind to beat the Vancouver Whitecaps FC 2–1 away. He netted a further two times in his only MLS season, in which he was affected by injuries and his team did not qualify for the playoffs.

=== Levante ===
José Mari returned to Spain on 17 January 2015, after agreeing to a one-and-a-half-year deal with top-tier Levante UD. He made his debut on 7 February, coming on as a substitute for David Barral for the last two minutes of a 4–1 home win over Real Sociedad after the latter had scored a hat-trick.

José Mari left the Granotes in May 2016 as his contract was due to expire, and the side also suffered relegation.

=== Cádiz ===
On 16 August 2016, José Mari signed a two-year deal with Cádiz CF. In October 2019, aged 31, he agreed to an extension until 2020.

José Mari appeared in his 100th competitive match on 6 March 2020, against CD Lugo. He played a further 28 games during the season (one goal), as the team returned to the top division after a 14-year absence.

José Mari scored his only goal in the top tier on 16 May 2021, opening a 3–1 home loss to Elche CF. On 2 November, he renewed his contract until 2024.

On 19 November 2024, having struggled severely with a knee injury, José Mari announced his retirement at the age of 36.

== Career statistics ==
Appearances and goals by club, season and competition
| Club | Season | League | | | National cup | | Other | | Total | |
| Club | Season | Division | Apps | Goals | Apps | Goals | Apps | Goals | Apps | Goals |
|---|---|---|---|---|---|---|---|---|---|---|
| Roteña | 2006–07 | Primera Andaluza | 21 | 3 | — | | — | | 21 | 3 |
| Sanluqueño | 2007–08 | Tercera División | 22 | 0 | — | | — | | 22 | 0 |
| Sanluqueño | 2008–09 | Tercera División | 34 | 4 | — | | — | | 34 | 4 |
| Sanluqueño | Total | | 56 | 4 | 0 | 0 | — | | 56 | 4 |
| Murcia B | 2009–10 | Segunda División B | 28 | 0 | — | | — | | 28 | 0 |
| Real Jaén | 2010–11 | Segunda División B | 34 | 0 | 1 | 0 | — | | 35 | 0 |
| Real Jaén | 2011–12 | Segunda División B | 33 | 2 | 2 | 0 | 2 | 0 | 35 | 2 |
| Real Jaén | Total | | 67 | 2 | 3 | 0 | 2 | 0 | 70 | 2 |
| Zaragoza | 2012–13 | La Liga | 24 | 0 | 3 | 1 | — | | 27 | 1 |
| Zaragoza | 2013–14 | Segunda División | 14 | 0 | 0 | 0 | — | | 14 | 0 |
| Zaragoza | Total | | 38 | 0 | 3 | 1 | — | | 41 | 1 |
| Colorado Rapids | 2014 | Major League Soccer | 20 | 4 | 1 | 0 | — | | 23 | 4 |
| Levante | 2014–15 | La Liga | 14 | 0 | 0 | 0 | — | | 14 | 0 |
| Levante | 2015–16 | La Liga | 12 | 0 | 2 | 0 | — | | 14 | 0 |
| Levante | Total | | 26 | 0 | 2 | 0 | — | | 28 | 0 |
| Cádiz | 2016–17 | Segunda División | 30 | 0 | 1 | 0 | 2 | 0 | 33 | 0 |
| Cádiz | 2017–18 | Segunda División | 10 | 0 | 1 | 0 | — | | 11 | 0 |
| Cádiz | 2018–19 | Segunda División | 34 | 1 | 1 | 0 | — | | 35 | 1 |
| Cádiz | 2019–20 | Segunda División | 29 | 1 | 0 | 0 | — | | 29 | 1 |
| Cádiz | 2020–21 | La Liga | 22 | 1 | 1 | 0 | — | | 23 | 1 |
| Cádiz | 2021–22 | La Liga | 11 | 0 | 0 | 0 | — | | 11 | 0 |
| Cádiz | 2022–23 | La Liga | 18 | 0 | 1 | 0 | — | | 19 | 0 |
| Cádiz | 2023–24 | La Liga | 3 | 0 | 2 | 0 | — | | 5 | 0 |
| Cádiz | Total | | 157 | 3 | 7 | 0 | 2 | 0 | 166 | 3 |
| Career total | | | 413 | 16 | 16 | 1 | 4 | 0 | 433 | 17 |
