= José Ángel Carrillo =

Spanish footballer (born 1994)

Personal information
- Full name: José Ángel Carrillo Casamayor
- Date of birth: 7 January 1994 (age 32)
- Place of birth: Murcia, Spain
- Height: 1.91 m (6 ft 3 in)
- Position: Forward

Youth career
- Colegio San Vicente Ferrer
- 2002–2004: El Progreso
- 2004–2013: Murcia

Senior career*
Years	Team	Apps	(Gls)
2013–2014	Murcia B	2	(0)
2014–2015	Murcia	24	(5)
2015–2017	Sevilla B	53	(8)
2017–2019	Cádiz	42	(6)
2019	Córdoba	10	(2)
2019	Hapoel Be'er Sheva	1	(0)
2019–2022	Lugo	83	(15)
2022–2023	Huesca	21	(2)
2023–2025	Murcia	45	(10)
2025	Chongqing Tonglianglong	30	(10)
- * Club domestic league appearances and goals as of 8 November 2025

José Ángel Carrillo Casamayor (born 7 January 1994) is a Spanish footballer. Mainly a forward, he can also play as a right winger.

== Career ==
=== Murcia ===
Born in Murcia, Carrillo finished his graduation with local Real Murcia's youth system, and made his senior debuts with the reserves in the 2013–14 season in Tercera División.

On 26 January 2014 Carrillo made his official debut for the Murcians' first-team, playing the last five minutes of a 2–2 home draw against RCD Mallorca in the Segunda División. In June, after the club's administrative relegation, he was definitely promoted to the main squad.

=== Sevilla Atlético / Cádiz ===
On 17 July 2015, Carrillo was transferred to fellow Segunda División B club Sevilla Atlético. He contributed with 37 appearances and four goals during the campaign, as his side achieved promotion to the second level.

Carrillo scored his first professional goal on 2 September 2016, netting the equalizer in a 1–1 home draw against UCAM Murcia CF. On 1 September of the following year, he signed a three-year deal with Cádiz CF, still in the second division.

=== Córdoba / Hapoel Be'er Sheva ===
On 27 January 2019, after featuring sparingly during the campaign, Carrillo agreed to a two-and-a-half-year contract with Córdoba CF in the same division. On 11 June, after suffering relegation, he terminated his contract and moved to Hapoel Be'er Sheva FC in the following day.

=== Lugo ===
Carrillo left Hapoel with just one match, and on 22 November 2019, he signed a short-term deal back at Spain's second division with CD Lugo.

=== Huesca ===
On 22 August 2022, free agent Carrillo signed a two-year contract with SD Huesca also in the second level.

=== Return to Murcia ===
On 14 August 2023, Carrillo returned to his first club Murcia, in Primera Federación.

== International career ==
Carrillo is eligible to represent Spain at international level. He is as well eligible to play for the Philippines due to his great-grandfather being born in the country.

In 2019, it was reported that Carrillo received an invitation to train with the Philippines.

== Career statistics ==
As of match played 8 November 2025

Appearances and goals by club, season and competition
Club	Season	League			National Cup		Continental		Other		Total	
Club	Season	Division	Apps	Goals	Apps	Goals	Apps	Goals	Apps	Goals	Apps	Goals
Murcia	2013–14	Segunda División	2	0	—		—		—		2	0
Murcia	2014–15	Segunda División B	24	5	1	0	—		—		25	5
Murcia	Total		26	5	1	0	—		—		27	5
Sevilla B	2015–16	Segunda División B	31	4	—		—		6	0	37	4
Sevilla B	2016–17	Segunda División	22	4	—		—		—		22	4
Sevilla B	2017–18	Segunda División	0	0	—		—		—		0	0
Sevilla B	Total		53	8	—		—		6	0	59	8
Cádiz	2017–18	Segunda División	31	5	4	0	—		—		35	5
Cádiz	2018–19	Segunda División	11	1	2	0	—		—		13	1
Cádiz	Total		42	6	6	0	—		—		48	6
Córdoba	2018–19	Segunda División	10	2	—		—		—		10	2
Hapoel Be'er Sheva	2019–20	Israeli Premier League	1	0	—		4	0	2	1	7	1
Lugo	2019–20	Segunda División	20	4	1	0	—		—		21	4
Lugo	2020–21	Segunda División	30	2	2	0	—		—		32	2
Lugo	2021–22	Segunda División	33	9	1	0	—		—		34	9
Lugo	Total		83	15	4	0	—		—		87	15
Huesca	2022–23	Segunda División	21	2	0	0	—		—		21	2
Huesca	2023–24	Segunda División	0	0	—		—		—		0	0
Huesca	Total		21	2	0	0	—		—		21	2
Murcia	2023–24	Primera Federación	34	9	1	0	—		—		35	9
Murcia	2024–25	Primera Federación	11	2	—		—		2	0	13	2
Murcia	Total		45	11	1	0	—		2	0	48	11
Chongqing Tonglianglong	2025	China League One	30	10	1	0	—		—		31	10
Career total			311	59	13	0	4	0	10	1	338	60
