= Álvaro García (footballer, born 1992) =

Spanish footballer

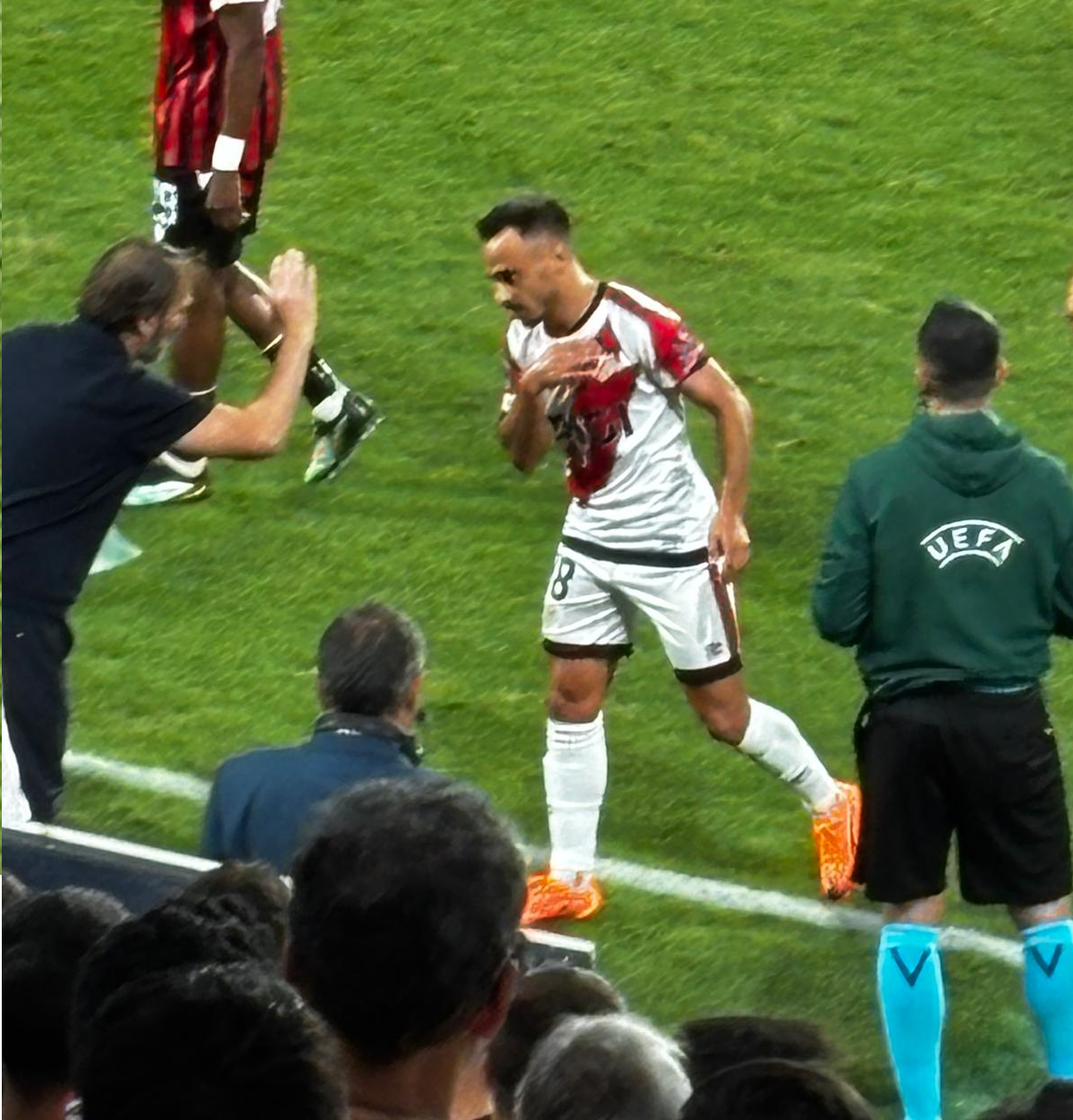
- García in 2025

Personal information
- Full name: Álvaro García Rivera
- Date of birth: 27 October 1992 (age 34)
- Place of birth: Utrera, Spain
- Height: 1.68 m (5 ft 6 in)
- Positions: Attacking midfielder; left winger

Team information
- Current team: Rayo Vallecano
- Number: 18

Youth career
- Utrera
- 2010–2011: Goyu-Ryu

Senior career*
Years	Team	Apps	(Gls)
2011–2013	Utrera		
2013	San Fernando	15	(1)
2013–2014	Granada B	31	(6)
2013–2016	Granada	4	(0)
2014–2015	→ Racing Santander (loan)	30	(3)
2015–2016	→ Cádiz (loan)	34	(7)
2016–2018	Cádiz	74	(15)
2018–	Rayo Vallecano	288	(38)
- * Club domestic league appearances and goals as of 24 October 2026

Álvaro García Rivera (born 27 October 1992) is a Spanish professional footballer who plays for La Liga club Rayo Vallecano as an attacking midfielder or left winger.

== Career ==
Born in Utrera, Province of Seville, García finished his formation with local CG Goyu-Ryu, signing for CD Utrera in August 2011. He made his senior debuts in the 2011–12 season, with his team in the regional championships.

On 23 January 2013, García moved to San Fernando CD, in Segunda División B. He finished the campaign with 15 appearances (12 starts), scoring one goal.

On 6 July, García joined La Liga side Granada CF for four years. He featured with the first team during pre-season, and made his professional – and La Liga – debut on 18 August, playing the last twelve minutes of a 2–1 away win against CA Osasuna.

On 28 August 2014, García was loaned to Segunda División club Racing de Santander, in a season-long loan deal. Roughly a year later he moved to Cádiz CF, also in a temporary deal.

On 19 July 2016, after scoring a career-best nine goals in the Yellow Submarine's promotion campaign, García signed a permanent four-year deal after rescinding with Granada. On 14 January 2018, he scored a brace in a 2–0 home defeat of Córdoba CF.

On 13 August 2018, Cádiz announced that 50% of García's federative rights were sold to SD Huesca for a fee of €3 million, but the player announced hours later he would not play for the latter club. Ten days later, he joined Rayo Vallecano on a five-year contract.

During his spell at the club, he became Rayo Vallecano's all-time top scorer in La Liga after scoring in a 3–0 away win over Levante on 19 October 2025, netting his 29th league goal for the club to surpass the previous record held by Alberto Bueno. On 15 February 2026, he surpassed Jesús Diego Cota as the player with the most appearances for the club in the top flight, reaching 198 matches in La Liga.

== Career statistics ==
As of match played 24 October 2026

Appearances and goals by club, season and competition
Club	Season	League			Copa del Rey		Europe		Other		Total	
Club	Season	Division	Apps	Goals	Apps	Goals	Apps	Goals	Apps	Goals	Apps	Goals
San Fernando	2012–13	Segunda División B	15	1	—		—		—		15	1
Granada B	2013–14	Segunda División B	30	6	—		—		—		30	6
Granada B	2014–15	Segunda División B	1	0	—		—		—		1	0
Granada B	Total		31	6	—		—		—		31	6
Granada	2013–14	La Liga	4	0	0	0	—		—		4	0
Racing Santander (loan)	2014–15	Segunda División	30	3	0	0	—		—		30	3
Cádiz (loan)	2015–16	Segunda División B	34	7	5	0	—		5 (Note: Appearances in Segunda División promotion play-offs)	2	44	9
Cádiz	2016–17	Segunda División	38	5	1	0	—		2 (Note: Appearances in La Liga promotion play-offs)	0	41	5
Cádiz	2017–18	Segunda División	36	10	4	1	—		—		40	11
Cádiz	Total		108	22	10	1	—		7	2	125	25
Rayo Vallecano	2018–19	La Liga	35	4	2	1	—		—		37	5
Rayo Vallecano	2019–20	Segunda División	35	4	3	0	—		—		38	4
Rayo Vallecano	2020–21	Segunda División	39	2	2	0	—		4	2	45	4
Rayo Vallecano	2021–22	La Liga	36	7	3	1	—		—		39	8
Rayo Vallecano	2022–23	La Liga	35	5	3	0	—		—		38	5
Rayo Vallecano	2023–24	La Liga	32	6	1	0	—		—		33	6
Rayo Vallecano	2024–25	La Liga	36	4	1	0	—		—		37	4
Rayo Vallecano	2025–26	La Liga	32	4	4	2	14 (Note: Appearance(s) in UEFA Europa Conference League)	5	—		50	11
Rayo Vallecano	2026–27	La Liga	8	2	0	0	—		—		8	2
Rayo Vallecano	Total		288	38	19	4	14	5	4	2	325	49
Career total			476	70	29	5	14	5	11	4	530	84

== Honors ==
Rayo Vallecano

- Segunda División play-offs: 2021
- UEFA Conference League runner-up: 2025–26

Individual

- Rayo Vallecano Player of the Season: 2018–19, 2021–22
