= Brian Oliván =

Spanish footballer

Personal information
- Full name: Brian Oliván Herrero
- Date of birth: 1 April 1994 (age 32)
- Place of birth: Barcelona, Spain
- Height: 1.75 m (5 ft 9 in)
- Position: Left-back

Youth career
- 2002–2013: Barcelona

Senior career*
Years	Team	Apps	(Gls)
2013–2014	Braga B	1	(0)
2014	CSKA Sofia	0	(0)
2014–2015	Valladolid B	35	(4)
2014–2015	Valladolid	2	(0)
2015–2017	Granada B	34	(2)
2016–2017	→ Cádiz (loan)	30	(0)
2017–2020	Cádiz	32	(0)
2019–2020	→ Girona (loan)	10	(0)
2020–2022	Mallorca	58	(1)
2022–2025	Espanyol	80	(1)
2026	Sporting Gijón	16	(1)

International career
- Spain U15
2009	Spain U16	2	(0)
2011	Spain U17	2	(0)
2022–	Catalonia	1	(0)
- * Club domestic league appearances and goals as of 6 June 2026

Brian Oliván Herrero (born 1 April 1994) is a Spanish professional footballer who plays as a left-back.

== Club career ==
Born in Barcelona, Catalonia, Oliván graduated with FC Barcelona's youth ranks. In August 2013, before even appearing as a senior he moved abroad, signing a three-year deal with Portuguese side S.C. Braga and being assigned to the reserves in Segunda Liga.

Oliván played his first match as a professional on 14 September 2013, coming on as a second-half substitute in a 1–0 away loss against C.D. Feirense. He rescinded his link with the club in January of the following year, and subsequently joined PFC CSKA Sofia in the following month.

On 21 July 2014, after failing to make any appearances with CSKA, Oliván joined another reserve team, Real Valladolid B in Segunda División B. On 18 December he first appeared with the main squad, starting in a 1–0 Copa del Rey away loss against Elche CF.

On 2 July 2015 Oliván signed a three-year deal with Granada CF, being assigned to the B-team also in the third division. On 23 August of the following year, he was loaned to Cádiz CF in the second tier, for one year.

After being an undisputed starter, Oliván was bought outright on 19 June 2017, and signed a contract until 2021. On 2 September 2019, he was loaned to fellow second division side Girona FC for the season.

On 9 September 2020, Oliván joined RCD Mallorca on a two-year deal. He helped the club in their promotion to La Liga in his first season, and made his top tier debut on 14 August 2021, starting and netting the opener in a 1–1 home draw against Real Betis.

On 21 June 2022, free agent Oliván moved to RCD Espanyol also in the main category, after agreeing to a three-year contract. After departing the Pericos in July 2025, he spent nearly six months unemployed before signing a short-term deal with Sporting de Gijón in the second division on 18 December.

== Career statistics ==
=== Club ===
As of match played 27 August 2021

Appearances and goals by club, season and competition
Club	Season	League			National Cup		Other		Total	
Club	Season	Division	Apps	Goals	Apps	Goals	Apps	Goals	Apps	Goals
Braga B	2013–14	Segunda Liga	1	0	—		—		1	0
CSKA Sofia	2013–14	First Football League	0	0	0	0	—		0	0
Valladolid B	2014–15	Segunda División B	35	4	—		—		35	4
Valladolid	2014–15	Segunda División	2	0	1	0	—		3	0
Granada B	2015–16	Segunda División B	34	2	—		—		34	2
Cádiz (loan)	2016–17	Segunda División	30	0	1	0	2 (Note: Appearance(s) in Promotion Playoffs)	0	33	0
Cádiz	2017–18	Segunda División	17	0	3	0	—		20	0
Cádiz	2018–19	Segunda División	15	0	2	0	—		17	0
Cádiz	2019–20	Segunda División	0	0	0	0	—		0	0
Cádiz	Total		62	0	6	0	2	0	70	0
Girona (loan)	2019–20	Segunda División	10	0	3	0	—		13	0
Mallorca	2020–21	Segunda División	30	0	1	0	—		31	0
Mallorca	2021–22	La Liga	3	1	0	0	—		3	1
Mallorca	Total		33	1	1	0	0	0	47	1
Espanyol	2022–23	La Liga	30	1	3	0	—		33	1
Career total			207	8	14	0	2	0	223	8
