= Alberto Cifuentes =

Spanish footballer

Personal information
- Full name: Alberto Cifuentes Martínez
- Date of birth: 29 May 1979 (age 47)
- Place of birth: Albacete, Spain
- Height: 1.89 m (6 ft 2 in)
- Position: Goalkeeper

Team information
- Current team: Lorca Deportiva (manager)

Youth career
- Albacete

Senior career*
Years	Team	Apps	(Gls)
1998–1999	Albacete B		
1998	Albacete	2	(0)
1999–2000	Dos Hermanas	24	(0)
2000–2003	Mallorca B	83	(0)
2003–2005	Mallorca	0	(0)
2004	→ Ciudad Murcia (loan)	18	(0)
2005–2007	Rayo Vallecano	70	(0)
2007–2009	Salamanca	55	(0)
2009–2013	Murcia	90	(0)
2013–2014	La Hoya Lorca	37	(0)
2014–2015	Piast Gliwice	15	(0)
2015	Piast Gliwice II	5	(0)
2015–2020	Cádiz	201	(0)
Total		600	(0)

Managerial career
- 2021–2024: Cádiz B
- 2024–2025: Villanovense
- 2025: Melilla
- 2025–2026: St Joseph's
- 2026–: Lorca Deportiva
- * Club domestic league appearances and goals

Alberto Cifuentes Martínez (born 29 May 1979) is a Spanish former professional footballer who played as a goalkeeper, he is currently the manager of Segunda Federación club CF Lorca Deportiva.

== Playing career ==
Born in Albacete, Castilla–La Mancha, Cifuentes started playing as a senior with local Albacete Balompié's reserves. On 15 November 1998, after starter Julio Iglesias was sent off early into a home game against CP Mérida, he made his debut in the Segunda División with the first team, going on to concede twice in a 0–2 home loss.

Cifuentes spent several years of his career in the Segunda División B, representing in the second tier, other than Albacete, Ciudad de Murcia, UD Salamanca, Real Murcia CF and Cádiz CF for a total of 293 appearances. In the 2004–05 season he was part of RCD Mallorca's La Liga roster, being only third choice behind Miguel Ángel Moyá and Sander Westerveld.

Cifuentes moved abroad for the first time in summer 2014 at the age of 35, joining a host of compatriots – including manager Ángel Pérez García – at Polish club Piast Gliwice. He made his debut in top-flight football on 20 July of that year, starting in a 4–0 Ekstraklasa defeat at Lech Poznań. He totalled 21 games during his spell, including five for the B side.

In July 2015, Cifuentes returned to Spain after signing a contract with Cádiz CF. He played 42 matches in his debut campaign, which ended in promotion from division three.

Cifuentes rarely missed a game for the Andalusians the following seasons, notably winning the Ricardo Zamora Trophy for the category in 2017–18. He was again instrumental as they returned to the top flight in 2020 after 14 years, still under coach Álvaro Cervera.

On 20 September 2020, aged 41, Cifuentes made his Spanish top-tier debut by starting in a 2–0 away win against SD Huesca, becoming the oldest player to do so in the process. On 5 October, after 209 competitive games for Cádiz, he retired.

== Coaching career ==
On 14 February 2021, after a spell as Cádiz sporting director, Cifuentes replaced Juan Manuel Pavón at the helm of their reserves. He left in July 2024 but continued to work in the Segunda Federación as head coach, with CF Villanovense and UD Melilla.

On 2 December 2025, Cifuentes was appointed manager of Gibraltar Football League club St Joseph's.

== Career statistics ==
Appearances and goals by club, season and competition
Club	Season	League			National Cup		Europe		Other		Total	
Club	Season	Division	Apps	Goals	Apps	Goals	Apps	Goals	Apps	Goals	Apps	Goals
Albacete	1998–99	Segunda División	2	0	—		—		—		2	0
Dos Hermanas	1999–2000	Segunda División B	24	0	—		—		—		24	0
Mallorca B	2000–01	Segunda División B	36	0	—		—		—		36	0
Mallorca B	2001–02	Segunda División	34	0	—		—		—		34	0
Mallorca B	2002–03	Segunda División	13	0	—		—		—		13	0
Mallorca B	Total		83	0	—		—		—		83	0
Mallorca	2000–01	La Liga	0	0	0	0	0	0	—		0	0
Mallorca	2001–02	La Liga	0	0	0	0	0	0	0	0	0	0
Mallorca	2002–03	La Liga	0	0	0	0	—		—		0	0
Mallorca	2003–04	La Liga	0	0	0	0	0	0	0	0	0	0
Mallorca	2004–05	La Liga	0	0	0	0	—		—		0	0
Mallorca	Total		0	0	0	0	0	0	0	0	34	0
Ciudad Murcia (loan)	2003–04	Segunda División	18	0	—		—		—		18	0
Rayo Vallecano	2005–06	Segunda División B	36	0	1	0	—		—		37	0
Rayo Vallecano	2006–07	Segunda División B	34	0	1	0	—		4	0	39	0
Rayo Vallecano	Total		70	0	2	0	—		4	0	76	0
Salamanca	2007–08	Segunda División	22	0	0	0	—		—		22	0
Salamanca	2008–09	Segunda División	33	0	0	0	—		—		33	0
Salamanca	Total		55	0	0	0	—		—		55	0
Murcia	2009–10	Segunda División B	18	0	3	0	—		—		31	0
Murcia	2010–11	Segunda División B	37	0	2	0	—		4	0	43	0
Murcia	2011–12	Segunda División	33	0	0	0	—		—		33	0
Murcia	2012–13	Segunda División	2	0	1	0	—		—		3	0
Murcia	Total		90	0	6	0	—		4	0	100	0
La Hoya Lorca	2013–14	Segunda División B	37	0	0	0	—		4	0	41	0
Piast Gliwice	2014–15	Ekstraklasa	15	0	1	0	—		—		16	0
Cádiz	2015–16	Segunda División B	36	0	0	0	—		6	0	42	0
Cádiz	2016–17	Segunda División	41	0	0	0	—		2	0	43	0
Cádiz	2017–18	Segunda División	42	0	0	0	—		—		41	0
Cádiz	2018–19	Segunda División	41	0	0	0	—		—		41	0
Cádiz	2019–20	Segunda División	39	0	0	0	—		—		39	0
Cádiz	2020–21	La Liga	2	0	—		—		—		2	0
Cádiz	Total		201	0	0	0	—		8	0	209	0
Career total			595	0	9	0	0	0	20	0	624	0

== Managerial statistics ==
As of 15 November 2026

Managerial record by team and tenure
Team	Nat	From	To	Record								Ref
Team	Nat	From	To	G	W	D	L	GF	GA	GD	Win %	Ref
Cádiz B	(Spain)	14 February 2021	5 July 2024	114	39	35	40	132	142	−10	34.21	
Villanovense	(Spain)	15 October 2024	23 May 2025	29	9	7	13	32	34	−2	31.03	
Melilla	(Spain)	16 June 2025	27 October 2025	9	2	3	4	10	13	−3	22.22	
St Joseph's	(Gibraltar)	2 December 2025	26 April 2026	16	10	2	4	49	11	+38	62.50	
Lorca Deportiva	(Spain)	27 October 2026	Present	3	2	1	0	5	2	+3	66.67	
Total				171	62	48	61	228	202	+26	36.26	—
