= Salvi (footballer) =

Spanish footballer

Salvi Sánchez
Personal information
- Full name: Salvador Sánchez Ponce
- Date of birth: 30 March 1991 (age 35)
- Place of birth: Sanlúcar de Barrameda, Spain
- Height: 1.75 m (5 ft 9 in)
- Position: Winger

Youth career
- Sevilla

Senior career*
Years	Team	Apps	(Gls)
2010–2012	Sevilla C	57	(7)
2011	Sevilla B	2	(0)
2012–2014	Sanluqueño	69	(7)
2014–2015	Villanovense	29	(5)
2015–2022	Cádiz	217	(24)
2022–2023	Rayo Vallecano	25	(0)
2023–2025	Espanyol	24	(2)
2025–2026	Ceuta	23	(0)
- * Club domestic league appearances and goals as of 9 June 2026

Salvador Sánchez Ponce (born 30 March 1991), commonly known as Salvi Sánchez, is a Spanish professional footballer who plays as a winger.

== Career ==
=== Early career ===
Born in Sanlúcar de Barrameda, Cádiz, Andalusia, Sánchez finished his graduation with Sevilla FC, making his senior debuts with the C-team on 27 April 2010 by coming on as a second-half substitute in a 2–1 Tercera División away loss against UD Los Barrios. In the 2010–11 campaign, he appeared in two matches for the reserves in Segunda División B, but resumed his spell at the club with the C's.

In the 2012 summer Sánchez joined hometown club Atlético Sanluqueño CF, also in the third level. On 28 June 2014, after the club's relegation, he moved to fellow league team CF Villanovense.

=== Cádiz ===
On 5 July 2015, Sánchez signed for Cádiz CF, still in the third division. He scored a career-best seven goals during the campaign, as his side returned to Segunda División after six years, and renewed his contract for four years on 9 August 2016.

Sánchez made his professional debut on 19 August 2016, starting in a 1–1 away draw against UD Almería. He scored his first professional goal on 3 September, netting his team's second in a 3–2 loss at CD Mirandés.

On 5 November 2017, Sánchez scored a brace in a 2–0 away defeat of Almería. Sánchez became the top assist maker of Cádiz in 2019 with a total of eight assists, two of them in the matches of the 2018–19 season and six in the 2019–20 season.

On 27 September 2020, Sánchez scored his debut goal in La Liga in the match against former club Sevilla.

=== Rayo Vallecano ===
On 1 July 2022, Sánchez agreed to a two-year deal with Rayo Vallecano in the top tier.

=== Espanyol ===
On 19 August 2023, Sánchez signed for RCD Espanyol in the second division on a two-year contract. He was mainly a backup option during his first season, contributing with four goals in 31 appearances overall as the club returned to the top tier.

On 23 January 2025, after just one cup match during the entire campaign, Sánchez terminated his link with the Pericos.

=== Ceuta ===
On 4 September 2025, Salvi agreed to a one-year deal with AD Ceuta FC in division two.

== Personal life ==
Sánchez's younger brother Ezequiel is also a footballer. A right-back, he also represented Sanluqueño.

== Career statistics ==
As of match played 23 June 2024

Appearances and goals by club, season and competition
Club	Season	League			National cup		Other		Total	
Club	Season	Division	Apps	Goals	Apps	Goals	Apps	Goals	Apps	Goals
Sevilla B	2010–11	Segunda División B	2	0	—		—		2	0
Sanluqueño	2012–13	Segunda División B	33	4	2	0	—		35	4
Sanluqueño	2013–14	Segunda División B	36	3	0	0	—		36	3
Sanluqueño	Total		69	7	2	0	0	0	71	7
Villanovense	2014–15	Segunda División B	29	5	1	0	2 (Note: Appearance(s) in Promotion Playoffs)	0	32	5
Cádiz	2015–16	Segunda División B	27	6	5	1	6	1	38	8
Cádiz	2016–17	Segunda División	34	8	0	0	2	0	36	8
Cádiz	2017–18	Segunda División	36	4	4	0	—		40	4
Cádiz	2018–19	Segunda División	32	2	2	0	—		34	2
Cádiz	2019–20	Segunda División	37	0	0	0	—		37	0
Cádiz	2020–21	La Liga	28	2	1	0	—		29	2
Cádiz	2021–22	La Liga	23	2	2	0	—		25	2
Cádiz	Total		217	24	14	1	8	1	239	26
Rayo Vallecano	2022–23	La Liga	24	0	1	0	—		25	0
Rayo Vallecano	2023–24	La Liga	1	0	—		—		25	2
Rayo Vallecano	Total		25	0	1	0	—		26	0
Espanyol	2023–24	Segunda División	24	2	3	2	4	0	31	4
Career total			365	38	21	3	14	1	400	42
