= Jesús Fernández (footballer, born 1988) =

Spanish footballer

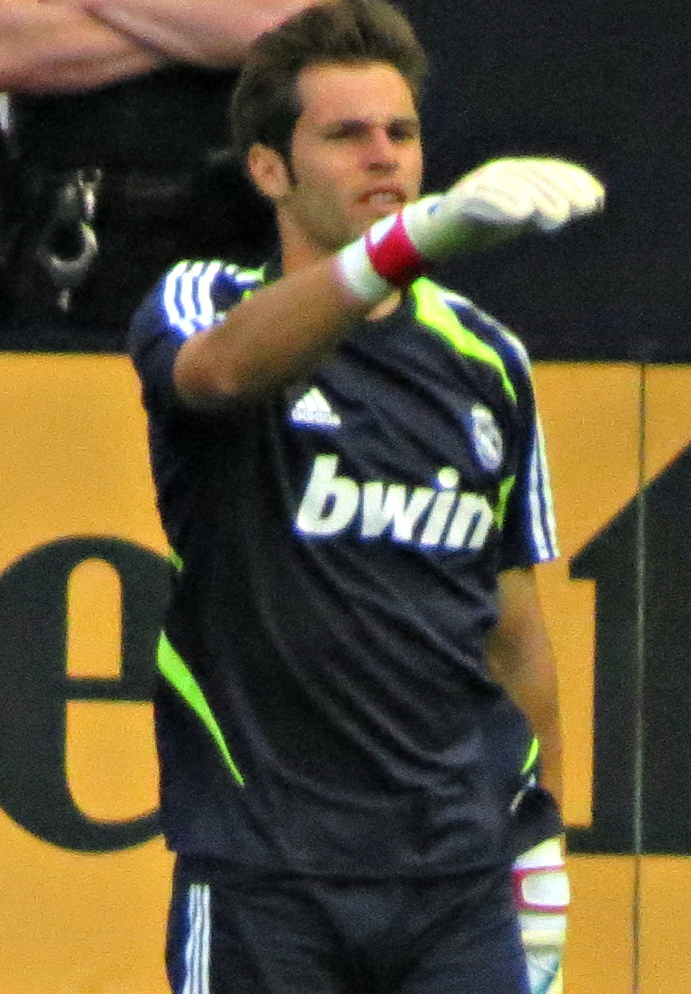
- Fernández training with Real Madrid in 2012

Personal information
- Full name: Jesús Fernández Collado
- Date of birth: 11 June 1988 (age 38)
- Place of birth: Madrid, Spain
- Height: 1.90 m (6 ft 3 in)
- Position: Goalkeeper

Youth career
- 1998–2004: Adarve
- 2004–2006: Villarreal
- 2006–2007: Getafe

Senior career*
Years	Team	Apps	(Gls)
2007–2009	Numancia B	66	(0)
2009–2010	Numancia	5	(0)
2010–2013	Real Madrid B	61	(0)
2011–2014	Real Madrid	2	(0)
2014–2016	Levante	6	(0)
2016	Granada	1	(0)
2016–2017	Cádiz	1	(0)
2017–2018	Cultural Leonesa	12	(0)
2018–2020	CFR Cluj	5	(0)
2020	→ Panetolikos (loan)	11	(0)
2020–2021	Sepsi OSK	8	(0)
2021–2022	Hércules	9	(0)
2022–2024	Voluntari	28	(0)
2024–2026	Politehnica Iași	54	(0)
- * Club domestic league appearances and goals as of 13 December 2025

Jesús Fernández Collado (born 11 June 1988) is a Spanish professional footballer who plays as a goalkeeper.

== Club career ==
=== Real Madrid ===
Born in Madrid, Fernández played youth football for three clubs. In 2007 he signed for CD Numancia, going on to play two seasons with the reserves in the Tercera División. In the 2009–10 campaign he was third choice with the main squad in the Segunda División, making his debut in the competition on 22 May 2010 in a 4–3 away loss against Real Unión.

Fernández returned to his hometown in 2010, joining Real Madrid and being assigned to Real Madrid Castilla in the Segunda División B. On 21 May 2011, in the last match of the season, he made his first-team and La Liga debut, replacing departing Jerzy Dudek in the last minutes of an 8–1 home demolition of UD Almería.

Fernández acted solely as third choice for the Merengues in the following two years, as understudy to Iker Casillas, Antonio Adán and Diego López. He made his first start on 1 June 2013, featuring in a 4–2 home victory over CA Osasuna in the last matchday.

=== Levante and Granada ===
On 4 August 2014, Levante UD reached an agreement with Real Madrid for the transfer of Fernández, who signed a two-year contract with the top division club. After being rarely used during his tenure, he moved to fellow league team Granada CF on 22 January 2016.

=== Cádiz and Cultural ===
On 21 July 2016, Fernández agreed to a two-year deal at Cádiz CF of the second division. Exactly one year later, and only three competitive appearances to his credit, he joined Cultural y Deportiva Leonesa in the same level.

=== CFR Cluj ===
On 17 August 2018, Fernández signed a contract with Romanian defending champions CFR Cluj.

== Career statistics ==
As of match played 13 December 2025

Appearances and goals by club, season and competition
Club	Season	League			National cup (Note: Includes Copa del Rey, Cupa României, Greek Cup)		Continental		Other		Total	
Club	Season	Division	Apps	Goals	Apps	Goals	Apps	Goals	Apps	Goals	Apps	Goals
Numancia B	2007–08	Tercera División	?	?	—		—		—		?	?
Numancia B	2008–09	Tercera División	?	?	—		—		—		?	?
Numancia B	Total		66	0	—		—		—		66	0
Numancia	2009–10	Segunda División	5	0	0	0	—		—		5	0
Real Madrid B	2010–11	Segunda División B	26	0	—		—		—		20	0
Real Madrid B	2011–12	Segunda División B	21	0	—		—		—		21	0
Real Madrid B	2012–13	Segunda División	14	0	—		—		—		14	0
Real Madrid B	Total		61	0	—		—		—		61	0
Real Madrid	2010–11	La Liga	1	0	0	0	0	0	—		1	0
Real Madrid	2011–12	La Liga	0	0	0	0	0	0	—		0	0
Real Madrid	2012–13	La Liga	1	0	0	0	0	0	—		1	0
Real Madrid	2013–14	La Liga	0	0	0	0	0	0	—		0	0
Real Madrid	Total		2	0	0	0	0	0	—		2	0
Levante	2014–15	La Liga	6	0	4	0	—		—		10	0
Granada	2015–16	La Liga	1	0	0	0	—		—		1	0
Cádiz	2016–17	Segunda División	1	0	2	0	—		—		3	0
Cultural Leonesa	2017–18	Segunda División	12	0	2	0	—		—		14	0
CFR Cluj	2018–19	Liga I	3	0	5	0	1 (Note: Appearance in UEFA Europa League)	0	—		9	0
CFR Cluj	2019–20	Liga I	2	0	1	0	0	0	—		3	0
CFR Cluj	Total		5	0	6	0	1	0	—		12	0
Panetolikos (loan)	2019–20	Super League Greece	11	0	1	0	—		—		12	0
Sepsi OSK	2020–21	Liga I	8	0	0	0	—		—		8	0
Hércules	2021–22	Segunda División RFEF	9	0	0	0	—		—		8	0
Voluntari	2022–23	Liga I	2	0	3	0	—		—		5	0
Voluntari	2023–24	Liga I	26	0	4	0	—		—		30	0
Voluntari	Total		28	0	7	0	—		—		35	0
Politehnica Iași	2024–25	Liga I	37	0	1	0	—		2 (Note: Appearance in Liga I promotion/relegation play-offs)	0	40	0
Politehnica Iași	2025–26	Liga II	17	0	0	0	—		—		17	0
Politehnica Iași	Total		54	0	1	0	—		2	0	57	0
Career total			269	0	23	0	1	0	2	0	295	0

== Honours ==
Real Madrid Castilla

- Segunda División B: 2011–12

CFR Cluj

- Liga I: 2018–19, 2019–20
