= Luis Ruiz (footballer, born 1992) =

Spanish footballer

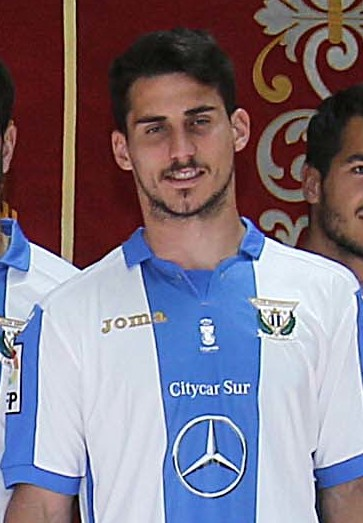
- Ruiz with Leganés in 2016

Personal information
- Full name: Luis Ruiz Sayago
- Date of birth: 30 June 1992 (age 34)
- Place of birth: Huelva, Spain
- Height: 1.81 m (5 ft 11 in)
- Position: Left back

Youth career
- Atlético Madrid

Senior career*
Years	Team	Apps	(Gls)
2011–2013	Atlético Madrid C	60	(1)
2013–2016	Leganés	55	(0)
2016–2017	Cádiz	13	(0)
2017–2019	Lugo	42	(1)
2019–2020	Deportivo La Coruña	14	(0)
2020–2021	Lugo	23	(0)
2021–2024	San Fernando	68	(2)
- * Club domestic league appearances and goals as of 25 May 2024

Luis Ruiz Sayago (born 30 June 1992) is a Spanish footballer who plays as a left back.

== Football career ==
Born in Huelva, Andalusia, Ruiz finished his graduation with Atlético Madrid's youth setup, and made his senior debuts with the C-team in Tercera División. On 5 August 2013 he moved to CD Leganés, in Segunda División B.

Ruiz appeared in 28 matches during his debut campaign, as the Madrid side were promoted to Segunda División after a ten-year absence, and signed a new one-year deal on 7 July 2014.

On 24 August 2014 Ruiz played his first match as a professional, starting in a 1–1 home draw against Deportivo Alavés. He contributed with 20 appearances during the 2015–16 season, as his side achieved promotion to La Liga for the first time ever.

On 2 August 2016, free agent Ruiz signed for Cádiz CF, still in the second division. The following 28 June, after appearing rarely, he moved to fellow league team CD Lugo.

On 5 August 2019, Ruiz agreed to a one-year deal with Deportivo de La Coruña also in division two. On 7 September of the following year, after Dépor's relegation, he returned to his previous club lugo on a one-year contract.
