= Servando Sánchez =

Spanish footballer and manager

Servando
Personal information
- Full name: Servando Sánchez Barahona
- Date of birth: 2 June 1984 (age 42)
- Place of birth: San Fernando, Spain
- Height: 1.81 m (5 ft 11 in)
- Position: Centre-back

Youth career
- San Fernando

Senior career*
Years	Team	Apps	(Gls)
2003–2004	San Fernando		
2004–2005	Atlético Aviación	26	(1)
2005–2006	Díter Zafra	29	(1)
2006–2007	Oviedo	18	(2)
2007–2009	Jerez Industrial	54	(5)
2009–2010	San Roque	20	(1)
2010–2011	Roquetas	33	(0)
2011–2014	Jaén	94	(5)
2014–2019	Cádiz	118	(5)
Total		392	(20)

Managerial career
- 2019–2022: Cádiz (assistant)
- * Club domestic league appearances and goals

Servando Sánchez Barahona (born 2 June 1984), known simply as Servando, is a Spanish former footballer who played as a central defender.

He amassed Segunda División totals of 87 matches and three goals over four seasons, at the service of Jaén and Cádiz. Most of his 16-year senior career was spent in the lower leagues.

== Club career ==
Born in San Fernando, Province of Cádiz in Andalusia, Servando made his senior debut with local CD San Fernando, then moved to Atlético Aviación in summer 2004. He first arrived in the Segunda División B one year later, signing for CD Díter Zafra. In July 2009, he joined CD San Roque de Lepe after spells with Real Oviedo and Jerez Industrial CF, the latter in the Tercera División.

On 9 August 2010, Servando signed with CD Roquetas also in the third tier. In July 2011 he joined Real Jaén, scoring four goals in 35 games in his second season and adding one in six appearances in the successful promotion play-offs.

Servando played his first professional match on 18 August 2013 at the age of 29, starting in a 1–2 home loss against SD Eibar. He made 34 appearances during the campaign, as his team were immediately relegated to the third level.

On 16 July 2014, Servando terminated his contract with Jaén and signed with Cádiz CF also in division three. He also achieved promotion to the second tier with the latter club in 2016, again as a starter, being deployed as a left-back and a defensive midfielder by managers Claudio Barragán and his successor Álvaro Cervera in the process.

On 12 June 2019, Servando announced his retirement from football after complications stemming from a triple facial fracture occurred in a match against CD Tenerife in the Copa del Rey. The following month, he was named Cervera's assistant at Cádiz.

== Personal life ==
Servando's brother, Germán, was also a footballer and a defender.
