= Rubén Cruz =

Spanish footballer

Personal information
- Full name: Rubén Cruz Gil
- Date of birth: 13 October 1985 (age 41)
- Place of birth: Utrera, Spain
- Height: 1.84 m (6 ft 0 in)
- Position: Winger

Youth career
- Betis

Senior career*
Years	Team	Apps	(Gls)
2004–2007	Betis C		
2005–2010	Betis B	98	(4)
2010–2011	Unión Estepona	26	(8)
2011–2012	Melilla	24	(2)
2012–2013	Écija	29	(9)
2013–2016	Albacete	108	(43)
2016–2018	Cádiz	33	(0)
2018–2019	Cartagena	57	(17)
2019–2020	Recreativo Huelva	19	(2)
2020–2023	Utrera	81	(29)
- * Club domestic league appearances and goals as of 14 May 2023

Rubén Cruz Gil (born 13 October 1985) is a Spanish footballer who plays as a left winger.

== Club career ==
Cruz was born in Utrera, Seville, Andalusia. A Real Betis' youth graduate, he made senior debuts with the C-team, and later spent several seasons with the reserves in Tercera División and Segunda División B.

In the 2010 summer Cruz moved to neighbouring Unión Estepona CF. He continued to appear in the third level in the following years, representing UD Melilla, Écija Balompié and Albacete Balompié. With the latter he achieved promotion to Segunda División, scoring a career-best 26 goals in 39 matches.

On 24 August 2014 Cruz played his first match as a professional, replacing Chumbi and scoring his side's last of a 2–3 home loss against AD Alcorcón. He finished the campaign as the club's top goalscorer, with ten goals in 37 appearances.

On 5 August 2016, after Alba's relegation, Cruz signed a one-year contract with Cádiz CF still in the second division. On 15 January 2018, he moved to FC Cartagena in the third level.
