= Javier Carpio =

Spanish footballer (born 1984)

Personal information
- Full name: Javier Carpio Martín
- Date of birth: 6 April 1984 (age 42)
- Place of birth: Salamanca, Spain
- Height: 1.77 m (5 ft 10 in)
- Position: Right-back

Youth career
- Salamanca

Senior career*
Years	Team	Apps	(Gls)
2003–2004	Salamanca B		
2004–2005	Alavés C		
2005–2006	Alavés B	27	(0)
2006–2007	Mazarrón		
2007–2008	Pinatar	31	(1)
2008–2010	Alcoyano	73	(0)
2010–2012	Elche	60	(0)
2012–2015	Ponferradina	91	(0)
2015–2016	Alavés	34	(0)
2016–2018	Cádiz	64	(0)
2019–2020	Salamanca	33	(1)
2020–2023	Palencia	74	(1)
Total		487	(3)
- * Club domestic league appearances and goals

Javier Carpio Martín (born 6 April 1984) is a Spanish former professional footballer who played as a right-back.

He appeared in 243 Segunda División matches in eight seasons, representing Elche, Ponferradina, Alavés and Cádiz and winning promotion to La Liga with the third of those clubs.

== Club career ==
Born in Salamanca, Castile and León, Carpio was an UD Salamanca youth graduate. After making his debut as a senior with the reserves in the 2003–04 season, he moved to Deportivo Alavés in 2004.

Carpio appeared for the Basques' C and B teams during his tenure, the latter competing in the Segunda División B. Subsequently, he joined Tercera División club Mazarrón CF in 2006.

Following a one-year spell at Pinatar CF also in the fourth level, Carpio signed for division three side CD Alcoyano. He was an undisputed starter in his two seasons, missing out on play-off promotion in both of them.

On 23 July 2010, Carpio was presented at Elche CF from Segunda División. He played his first match as a professional on 28 August at the age of 26, coming on as a late substitute for Jordi Xumetra in a 1–0 home win against Recreativo de Huelva.

First-choice in his debut campaign at the Estadio Manuel Martínez Valero, Carpio eventually lost his spot to new signing Javier Flaño in the second. Subsequently, he was released.

Carpio joined SD Ponferradina of the same league in summer 2012. After three years as a regular starter, he moved to Deportivo Alavés also in the second tier. He contributed 34 appearances during the season, helping to a return to La Liga after a ten-year absence.

On 16 July 2016, Carpio joined Cádiz CF still in the second division. He moved down a tier in January 2019, agreeing to a contract at Salamanca CF UDS.

Carpio saw out his career aged 39, having signed for Palencia CF in the Castile and León regional leagues in late 2020 and achieving promotion to Tercera Federación one year later.

== Honours ==
Alavés

- Segunda División: 2015–16
