= Migue =

Spanish footballer (born 1980)

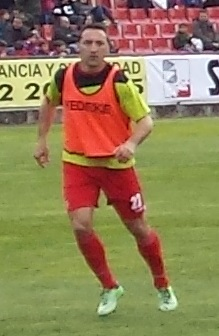
- Migue training with Girona in 2014

Personal information
- Full name: Miguel Ángel González González
- Date of birth: 14 March 1980 (age 46)
- Place of birth: Terrassa, Spain
- Height: 1.85 m (6 ft 1 in)
- Position: Centre-back

Youth career
- Barcelona

Senior career*
Years	Team	Apps	(Gls)
1998–2001	Barcelona C	90	(6)
2001–2003	Sporting Gijón B	32	(0)
2003–2004	Mataró	33	(1)
2004–2005	Figueres	26	(2)
2005–2007	Terrassa	59	(2)
2007–2014	Girona	238	(9)
2014–2015	Alavés	23	(1)
2015	Huracán	16	(0)
2016–2017	Cádiz	20	(1)
2017–2019	Sabadell	59	(2)
Total		596	(24)
- * Club domestic league appearances and goals

Miguel Ángel González González (born 14 March 1980), commonly known as Migue, is a Spanish former professional footballer who played as a central defender.

== Club career ==
Born in Terrassa, Barcelona, Catalonia, Migue played youth football for FC Barcelona, but only represented its C team as a senior. Released in 2001, he joined Sporting de Gijón, but his output for the main squad consisted of one Copa del Rey appearance.

From 2003 to 2008, Migue competed in the Segunda División B, representing several clubs including hometown's Terrassa FC. At the end of the 2007–08 season he helped another side in his native region, Girona FC, promote to Segunda División after a 49-year absence by scoring the only goal of the play-off tie against AD Ceuta.

Migue appeared in his first game as a professional on 30 August 2008 at the age of 28, featuring 72 minutes in a 1–0 away win over RC Celta de Vigo. During his six-year spell in the second tier at the Estadi Montilivi, he never played less than 33 matches.

Migue alternated between divisions two and three the following years, representing Deportivo Alavés, Huracán Valencia CF, Cádiz CF and CE Sabadell FC. On 30 August 2019, the 39-year-old announced his retirement and returned to Girona as youth system coordinator.
