= Nico Hidalgo =

Spanish footballer (1992–2025)

Personal information
- Full name: Nicolás Hidalgo García
- Date of birth: 30 April 1992
- Place of birth: Motril, Spain
- Date of death: 1 March 2025 (aged 32)
- Height: 1.78 m (5 ft 10 in)
- Position: Central midfielder

Youth career
- Motril

Senior career*
Years	Team	Apps	(Gls)
2010–2012	Motril	40	(4)
2012–2014	Granada B	66	(9)
2014–2017	Juventus	0	(0)
2014–2016	→ Granada B (loan)	59	(4)
2016–2017	→ Cádiz (loan)	24	(1)
2017–2019	Cádiz	11	(0)
2018–2019	→ Racing Santander (loan)	34	(2)
2019–2020	Racing Santander	29	(0)
2020–2022	Extremadura	0	(0)
- * Club domestic league appearances and goals

Nicolás "Nico" Hidalgo García (30 April 1992 – 1 March 2025) was a Spanish footballer who played as a central midfielder.

== Career ==
Born in Motril, Granada, Nico graduated from Motril CF's youth setup, and made his senior debuts in the 2010–11 campaign, in Tercera División. On 25 June 2012, he moved to fellow league team Granada CF B, appearing regularly as his side were promoted to Segunda División B in his first season.

On 19 August 2014, Nico signed for Juventus FC, being immediately loaned back to the Rojiblancos for one year. On 3 December he made his first team debut, replacing fellow debutant Daniel Larsson in the 71st minute of a 1–0 home win against Córdoba CF, for the campaign's Copa del Rey.

On 15 July 2016, Nico was loaned to Segunda División club Cádiz CF, for one year. The following 15 March, he agreed to a permanent two-year deal with the club, effective as of 1 July.

On 26 August 2018, after being sparingly used, Hidalgo was loaned to third division side Racing de Santander for the season. The following 23 July, after achieving promotion to the second division, he signed a permanent contract with the club.

On 11 August 2020, after suffering immediate relegation, Hidalgo joined fellow relegated side Extremadura UD.

== Death ==
Hidalgo died from lung cancer on 1 March 2025, at the age of 32.
