= Álvaro Cervera =

Spanish football player and coach

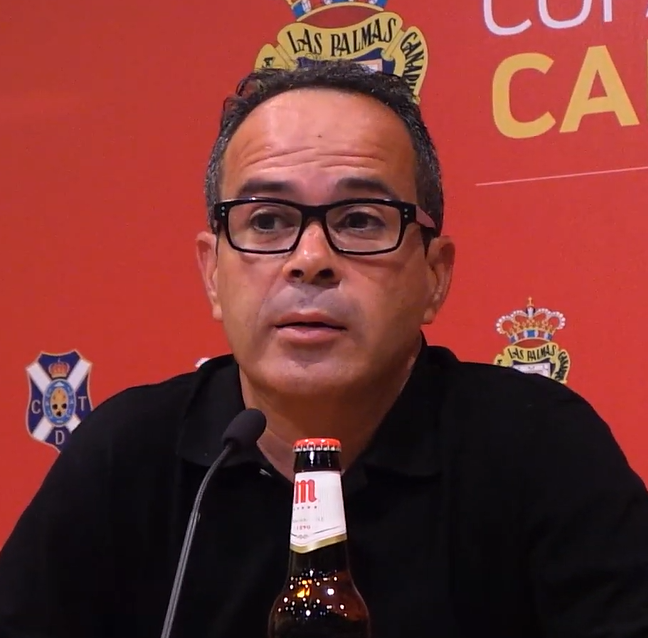
- Cervera in 2013

Personal information
- Full name: Álvaro Cervera Díaz
- Date of birth: 20 September 1965 (age 61)
- Place of birth: Santa Isabel, Guinea
- Height: 1.75 m (5 ft 9 in)
- Position: Winger

Team information
- Current team: Tenerife (manager)

Youth career
- Alegría
- Tenerife
- Perines
- Racing Santander

Senior career*
| Years | Team | Apps | (Gls) |
| 1983–1985 | Rayo Cantabria | 35 | (15) |
| 1984–1987 | Racing Santander | 33 | (5) |
| 1987–1992 | Mallorca | 139 | (10) |
| 1992–1995 | Valencia | 82 | (5) |
| 1995–1997 | Racing Santander | 42 | (3) |
| 1997–1998 | Hércules | 2 | (0) |
| 1998–1999 | Águilas | 11 | (1) |
| 1999 | Almería | 19 | (5) |
| 1999–2000 | San Fernando | 23 | (1) |
| 2000–2001 | Ontinyent | | |
| Total | | 386 | (45) |

International career
| 1987 | Spain U21 | 4 | (1) |
| 1991–1992 | Spain | 4 | (0) |

Managerial career
- 2001–2002: Catarroja (assistant)
- 2002–2003: Catarroja
- 2003–2004: Villarreal (youth)
- 2004–2005: Catarroja
- 2005: Castellón
- 2006: Almansa
- 2006–2007: Alicante
- 2008–2009: Cultural Leonesa
- 2009–2010: Jaén
- 2010–2011: Real Unión
- 2011–2012: Recreativo
- 2012: Racing Santander
- 2012–2015: Tenerife
- 2016–2022: Cádiz
- 2022–2023: Oviedo
- 2024–: Tenerife
- * Club domestic league appearances and goals

Álvaro Cervera Díaz (born 20 September 1965) is a Spanish football coach and former player who is the manager of Segunda División club Tenerife.

A winger, he played 261 matches in La Liga over 12 seasons for Racing Santander (in two spells), Mallorca and Valencia, scoring 17 goals. He won four caps for Spain in the 1990s.

Cervera became a coach in 2002, going on to work with a number of clubs.

== Club career ==
Born in Santa Isabel, Spanish Guinea when both his parents worked in that country, Cervera was raised in Santa Cruz de Tenerife and played youth football for four clubs, finishing his development at Racing Santander. He made his La Liga debut on 9 September 1984 by playing the full 90 minutes in a 1–0 away loss against Real Valladolid, but only totalled seven games in his first two senior seasons, featuring much more regularly in 1986–87 but suffering relegation.

In the summer of 1987, Álvaro – known by his first name during his playing days – signed for Mallorca, remaining five years with them and being relegated twice from the top flight. In the 1988–89 campaign, he scored a career-best six goals in 35 matches, helping the Balearic Islands team to promote from Segunda División.

Álvaro moved to Valencia in June 1992, following Mallorca's relegation. He made 32 appearances and netted three times in his first year (notably once in a 4–1 away victory over Athletic Bilbao), but was more often than not a reserve from there onwards, for that and his following club Racing, which he left to play with Hércules in the second division.

Álvaro retired in 2001 at the age of nearly 36, following a spell in the lower leagues.

== International career ==
Álvaro earned four caps for Spain in one year. He made his debut on 4 September 1991, coming on as a 76th-minute substitute for Andoni Goikoetxea in a 2–1 friendly win against Uruguay in Oviedo.

== Coaching career ==
Cervera took up coaching in 2001, working with amateurs Catarroja in several capacities. From 2004 to 2011, he managed almost exclusively in the Segunda División B, and his first job at the professional level arrived in 2011–12 when he was appointed at second-tier Recreativo. However, in March 2012, he arranged to have his contract terminated when he received an offer from former side Racing Santander in the top division, but he only collected three draws in his 13 games in charge to become the competition's worst ever debutant, and was not renewed.

On 3 July 2012, Cervera signed with Tenerife where he had already played youth football more than 30 years ago. Shortly before achieving promotion to the second division in his debut season, he renewed his link until 2015, being however relieved of his duties on 2 February 2015 even though he had a contract running until 2018.

On 18 April 2016, Cervera replaced Claudio Barragán at the helm of Cádiz, and managed to achieve promotion to the second tier at the end of the campaign. After coming fifth the following season, the team qualified for the play-offs for top-flight promotion, losing on regulations after a 1–1 semi-final draw with Tenerife in June 2017; promotion was finally gained in July 2020, ending a 14-year exile.

A quote from Cervera, "La lucha no se negocia" ("The fight is non-negotiable" in Spanish), was adopted by Cádiz as a club catchphrase shortly after his arrival. On 11 January 2022, as the club was in the relegation zone, he was sacked.

On 18 October 2022, Cervera replaced Bolo at Real Oviedo. He was dismissed on 21 September of the following year, after the start of the new season saw the side placed second-bottom.

Cervera returned to Tenerife on 23 December 2024, as their third manager of the second-division campaign. He was retained in spite of relegation, and achieved promotion at the first attempt.

== Managerial statistics ==
As of match played 21 November 2026

Managerial record by team and tenure
| Team | Nat | From | To | Record | | | | | | | | Ref |
| Team | Nat | From | To | G | W | D | L | GF | GA | GD | Win % | Ref |
|---|---|---|---|---|---|---|---|---|---|---|---|---|
| Catarroja | (Spain) | 1 August 2002 | 1 July 2003 | 34 | 20 | 9 | 5 | 64 | 23 | +41 | 58.82 | |
| Catarroja | (Spain) | 30 June 2004 | 25 April 2005 | 33 | 12 | 12 | 9 | 46 | 34 | +12 | 36.36 | |
| Castellón | (Spain) | 25 April 2005 | 30 June 2005 | 9 | 5 | 2 | 2 | 11 | 7 | +4 | 55.56 | |
| Almansa | (Spain) | 9 January 2006 | 30 June 2006 | 20 | 5 | 8 | 7 | 22 | 22 | +0 | 25.00 | |
| Alicante | (Spain) | 1 July 2006 | 16 April 2007 | 39 | 18 | 7 | 14 | 50 | 39 | +11 | 46.15 | |
| Cultural Leonesa | (Spain) | 1 July 2008 | 30 June 2009 | 40 | 20 | 11 | 9 | 46 | 25 | +21 | 50.00 | |
| Jaén | (Spain) | 31 August 2009 | 30 June 2010 | 43 | 22 | 11 | 10 | 62 | 37 | +25 | 51.16 | |
| Real Unión | (Spain) | 13 July 2010 | 2 January 2011 | 24 | 12 | 4 | 8 | 27 | 27 | +0 | 50.00 | |
| Recreativo | (Spain) | 28 June 2011 | 9 March 2012 | 28 | 10 | 6 | 12 | 34 | 32 | +2 | 35.71 | |
| Racing Santander | (Spain) | 9 March 2012 | 14 May 2012 | 13 | 0 | 3 | 10 | 7 | 28 | −21 | 0.00 | |
| Tenerife | (Spain) | 3 July 2012 | 2 February 2015 | 110 | 43 | 29 | 38 | 132 | 112 | +20 | 39.09 | |
| Cádiz | (Spain) | 18 April 2016 | 11 January 2022 | 258 | 98 | 84 | 76 | 288 | 259 | +29 | 37.98 | |
| Oviedo | (Spain) | 18 October 2022 | 21 September 2023 | 40 | 16 | 10 | 14 | 35 | 35 | +0 | 40.00 | |
| Tenerife | (Spain) | 23 December 2024 | Present | 78 | 34 | 23 | 21 | 108 | 70 | +38 | 43.59 | |
| Total | | | | 769 | 315 | 219 | 235 | 932 | 750 | +182 | 40.96 | — |

== See also ==
- List of Spain international footballers born outside Spain
