= 2021–22 CF Fuenlabrada season =

CF Fuenlabrada
2021–22 season
- President: Jonathan Praena
- Head coach: José Luis Oltra (until 14 December); Sergio Pellicer (from 15 December until 6 March); José Ramón Sandoval (from 7 March)
- Stadium: Estadio Fernando Torres
- Segunda División: 21st (relegated)
- Copa del Rey: Round of 32
- Top goalscorer: League: Pedro León (10); All: Pedro León (10)

The 2021–22 season was the 47th season in CF Fuenlabrada's history and the club's third consecutive season in the second division of Spanish football. In addition to competing in the domestic league, Fuenlabrada participated in this season's edition of the Copa del Rey.

== Players ==
=== First-team squad ===
As of 10 April 2022

Note: Flags indicate national team as defined under FIFA eligibility rules; some limited exceptions apply. Players may hold more than one non-FIFA nationality.

No.	Pos.	Nation	Player
2	DF	ESP	Pol Valentín
3	MF	ESP	Álvaro Bravo
4	DF	ESP	Alejandro Sotillos
5	DF	ESP	Juanma Marrero (captain)
6	MF	GEQ	Iban Salvador
8	MF	ESP	Cristóbal Márquez
9	FW	UKR	Roman Zozulya
10	FW	BRA	Anderson (on loan from Tsarsko Selo)
11	FW	GAM	Aboubakary Kanté
12	DF	ESP	Tachi (on loan from Alavés)
14	MF	ESP	Pedro León
15	DF	ESP	Rubén Pulido
16	MF	FRA	Brahim Konaté

No.	Pos.	Nation	Player
17	DF	ESP	Adrián Diéguez
18	MF	SEN	Mohamed Diamé
19	DF	ESP	Mikel Iribas (vice-captain)
20	MF	ESP	Javi Ontiveros
21	MF	ESP	Adrián
22	MF	NGR	Mikel Agu
23	MF	ESP	Jano Velasco
25	FW	MAR	Mohamed Bouldini (on loan from Santa Clara)
26	GK	ESP	Diego Altube (on loan from Real Madrid)
28	DF	ITA	Paolo Gozzi (on loan from Juventus)
29	MF	ESP	Damián
31	GK	ESP	Javier Belman
38	GK	ESP	Miguel Morro (on loan from Rayo Vallecano)

=== Reserve team ===
Note: Flags indicate national team as defined under FIFA eligibility rules; some limited exceptions apply. Players may hold more than one non-FIFA nationality.

No.	Pos.	Nation	Player
27	FW	ESP	David Amigo
30	FW	CIV	Jacques Dago
32	MF	GHA	Stephen Buer
33	FW	ESP	Kevin Manzano

No.	Pos.	Nation	Player
34	FW	ESP	Jaime Garrido
37	MF	ESP	Álex Blanco
39	MF	CMR	Yanike Tenkou
40	DF	ESP	Iñaki León

=== Out on loan ===
Note: Flags indicate national team as defined under FIFA eligibility rules; some limited exceptions apply. Players may hold more than one non-FIFA nationality.

No.	Pos.	Nation	Player
—	DF	ESP	Paco Puertas (at Burgos Promesas until 30 June 2022)
—	MF	PER	Aldair Fuentes (at Alianza Lima until 31 December 2024)

No.	Pos.	Nation	Player
—	MF	ESP	Álex Mula (at Alcorcón until 30 June 2022)

== Pre-season and friendlies ==
Win Draw Loss Fixtures

30 July 2021 Friendly	Fuenlabrada	0–1	Getafe	Fuenlabrada, Spain
20:00 CEST (UTC+2)			Chema 85'	Stadium: Fernando Torres

4 August 2021 Friendly	Leganés	0–2	Fuenlabrada	Leganés, Spain
19:00 CEST (UTC+2)				Stadium: Instalación Deportiva Butarque

7 August 2021 Friendly	Real Madrid Castilla	0–1	Fuenlabrada	Madrid, Spain
20:00 CEST (UTC+2)				Stadium: Alfredo Di Stéfano

== Competitions ==
=== Overall record ===
Competition	First match	Last match	Starting round	Final position	Record							
Competition	First match	Last match	Starting round	Final position	Pld	W	D	L	GF	GA	GD	Win %
Segunda División	15 August 2021	27 May 2022	Matchday 1	21st	42	6	15	21	39	65	−26	14.29
Copa del Rey	1 December 2021	6 January 2022	First round	Round of 32	3	1	1	1	1	1	+0	33.33
Total					45	7	16	22	40	66	−26	15.56

Source: Soccerway

=== Segunda División ===
==== League table ====
Pos	Team	Pld	W	D	L	GF	GA	GD	Pts	Qualification or relegation
18	Málaga	42	11	12	19	36	57	−21	45	
19	Amorebieta (R)	42	9	16	17	44	63	−19	43	Relegation to Primera Federación
20	Real Sociedad B (R)	42	10	10	22	43	61	−18	40	Relegation to Primera Federación
21	Fuenlabrada (R)	42	6	15	21	39	65	−26	33	Relegation to Primera Federación
22	Alcorcón (R)	42	6	11	25	37	71	−34	29	Relegation to Primera Federación

Source: LaLiga SmartBank
Rules for classification: 1) points; 2) head-to-head points; 3) head-to-head goal difference; 4) goal difference; 5) number of goals scored
(R) Relegated

==== Results summary ====
Overall								Home						Away					
Pld	W	D	L	GF	GA	GD	Pts	W	D	L	GF	GA	GD	W	D	L	GF	GA	GD
42	6	15	21	39	65	−26	33	4	10	7	23	26	−3	2	5	14	16	39	−23

Source: La Liga SmartBank

==== Results by round ====
Round	1	2	3	4	5	6	7	8	9	10	11	12	13	14	15	16	17	18	19	20	21	22	23	24	25	26	27	28	29	30	31	32	33	34	35	36	37	38	39	40	41	42
Ground	H	A	A	H	H	A	H	A	H	A	H	A	H	A	H	A	H	A	H	A	H	H	A	H	A	H	A	H	A	H	A	H	A	A	H	A	H	A	H	A	H	A
Result	L	W	D	D	D	D	W	L	W	D	D	L	L	L	D	L	D	D	D	L	D	L	L	W	L	D	D	D	L	L	L	W	L	L	L	L	L	L	L	W	D	L
Position	16	10	11	10	12	12	9	12	7	11	10	14	15	18	17	19	20	19	19	19	19	20	20	19	20	20	20	20	21	21	21	20	20	21	21	21	21	21	21	21	21	21

Source: La Liga SmartBank
A = Away; H = Home; W = Win; D = Draw; L = Loss

==== Matches ====
The league fixtures were announced on 30 June 2021.

15 August 2021 1	Fuenlabrada	1–2	Tenerife	Fuenlabrada
22:00 CEST (UTC+2)	Mula 67'	Report	Bermejo 5'; Corredera 90+4'	Stadium: Fernando Torres; Attendance: 1,184; Referee: Saúl Ais Reig

21 August 2021 2	Alcorcón	0–2	Fuenlabrada	Alcorcón
22:00 CEST (UTC+2)		Report	Kanté 67'; Anderson 83'	Stadium: Santo Domingo; Attendance: 1,044; Referee: Jon Ander González Esteban

29 August 2021 3	Real Sociedad B	0–0	Fuenlabrada	San Sebastián
19:30 CEST (UTC+2)		Report		Stadium: Anoeta; Referee: Iosu Galech Apezteguía

4 September 2021 4	Fuenlabrada	1–1	Lugo	Fuenlabrada
21:00 CEST (UTC+2)	León 39'	Report	Señé 27'	Stadium: Fernando Torres; Referee: Óliver de la Fuente Ramos

12 September 2021 5	Fuenlabrada	1–1	Zaragoza	Fuenlabrada
20:30 CEST (UTC+2)	Anderson 25'	Report	Vada 72' (pen.)	Stadium: Fernando Torres; Referee: Aitor Gorostegui Fernández-Ortega

19 September 2021 6	Huesca	0–0	Fuenlabrada	Huesca
14:00 CEST (UTC+2)				Stadium: El Alcoraz

27 September 2021 7	Fuenlabrada	2–1	Cartagena	Fuenlabrada
21:00 CEST (UTC+2)				Stadium: Fernando Torres

6 November 2021 15	Fuenlabrada	0–0	Eibar	Fuenlabrada
21:00 CET (UTC+1)	Dago (yellow card) 60'	Report	Etxeita (yellow card) 14'; Javi Muñoz (yellow card) 17'	Stadium: Estadio Fernando Torres; Attendance: 1,985; Referee: (Spain) Víctor García Verdura

27 November 2021 18	Sporting Gijón	1–1	Fuenlabrada	Gijón
CET (UTC+1)				Stadium: El Molinón

4 December 2021 19	Fuenlabrada	1–1	Almería	Fuenlabrada
18:15 CET	Zozulya 53'; Pedro León (yellow card) 65'; Cristóbal (yellow card) 67'	Report	Samú Costa (yellow card) 35'; Babić (yellow card) 51'; Juan Villar 72' (yellow card) 88'	Stadium: Estadio Fernando Torres; Attendance: 2,052; Referee: Juan Luis Pulido Santana

22 January 2022 24	Fuenlabrada	3–2	Las Palmas	Fuenlabrada
18:15 CET (UTC+1)		Report		Stadium: Fernando Torres

30 January 2022 25	Cartagena	3–0	Fuenlabrada	Cartagena
--:-- CET (UTC+1)				Stadium: Estadio Cartagonova

13 February 2022 27	Eibar	0–0	Fuenlabrada	Eibar
14:00 CEST (UTC+2)	Quique González (yellow card) 29'	Report	Mikel Iribas (yellow card) 78'	Stadium: Ipurua; Attendance: 4,633; Referee: Javier Iglesias Villanueva

25 February 2022 29	Almería	3–1	Fuenlabrada	Almería
21:00 CET	Babić (yellow card) 15'; Ramazani (yellow card) 27'; Arnau Puigmal 31'; Sadiq 65'; Íñigo Eguaras (yellow card) 75'; Dyego Sousa 77'; Curro Sánchez (yellow card) 88'	Report	Bouldini 36'; Tachi (yellow card) 90+1'; Javier Ontiveros (yellow card) 90+4'	Stadium: Estadio de los Juegos Mediterráneos; Attendance: 8,506; Referee: Víctor García Verdura

11 March 2022 31	Zaragoza	2–1	Fuenlabrada	Zaragoza
21:00 CET (UTC+1)	Narváez (yellow card) 37'; Iván Azón 54'; Miguel Puche 75'; Alejandro Francés (yellow card) 86'	Report	Bouldini (yellow card) 27'; Pedro León (yellow card) 30'; Jair Amador 32' (o.g.); Javier Ontiveros (yellow card) 37'; Sotillos (yellow card) 53'; Adrián Diéguez (yellow card) 84'	Stadium: La Romareda; Attendance: 16,317; Referee: Eduardo Prieto Iglesias

19 March 2022 32	Fuenlabrada	1–0	Málaga	Fuenlabrada
16:00 CET (UTC+1)	Bouldini 68'	Report		Stadium: Fernando Torres

26 March 2022 33	Oviedo	3–0	Fuenlabrada	Oviedo
CET (UTC+1)

4 April 2022 34	Leganés	3–2	Fuenlabrada	Leganés
CEST (UTC+2)

10 April 2022 35	Fuenlabrada	2–3	Huesca	Fuenlabrada
14:00 CEST (UTC+2)				Stadium: Estadio Fernando Torres

17 April 2022 36	Tenerife	3–1	Fuenlabrada	Santa Cruz de Tenerife
17:15 WEST (UTC+1)	Enric Gallego 27' 40'; Pablo Larrea (yellow card) 39'; Mario González 53'	Report	Kanté (yellow card) 41'; Javier Ontiveros (yellow card) 45+1'; Adrián Diéguez (yellow card) 56'; Konaté (yellow card) 61' (yellow-red card) 74'; Pedro León 64' (pen.); Rubén Pulido (yellow card) 88'	Stadium: Heliodoro Rodríguez López; Attendance: 11,750; Referee: Iván Caparrós Hernández

23 April 2022 37	Fuenlabrada	2–3	Ponferradina	Fuenlabrada
16:15 CEST (UTC+2)				Stadium: Estadio Fernando Torres

1 May 2022 38	Amorebieta	2–1	Fuenlabrada	Lezama
CEST (UTC+2)

7 May 2022 39	Fuenlabrada	1–2	Real Sociedad B	Fuenlabrada
16:00 CEST (UTC+2)	Tachi (yellow card) 39'; Bouldini 45', (yellow card) 85' (yellow-red card) 87'; Gozzi (yellow card) 75'; Iribas (yellow card) 87'; Zozulya (yellow card) 90'	Report	Alkain 63'; Martín (yellow card) 76'; Turrientes (yellow card) 83'; Sola 90+5'	Stadium: Estadio Fernando Torres; Attendance: 1,230; Referee: José Toca López

14 May 2022 40	Lugo	1–3	Fuenlabrada	Lugo
CEST (UTC+2)

21 May 2022 41	Fuenlabrada	0–0	Sporting Gijón	Fuenlabrada
21:00 CEST (UTC+2)				Stadium: Estadio Fernando Torres

27 May 2022 42	Mirandés	5–1	Fuenlabrada	Miranda de Ebro
CEST (UTC+2)

=== Copa del Rey ===
1 December 2021 First round	Alzira	0–1	Fuenlabrada	Alzira
20:00		Report	Soldano 55'	Stadium: Luis Suñer Picó; Referee: Dámaso Arcediano Monescillo

14 December 2021 Second round	San Sebastián de los Reyes	0–0 (a.e.t.) (4–5 p)	Fuenlabrada	San Sebastián de los Reyes
19:00		Report		Stadium: Nuevo Matapiñonera; Referee: Óliver de la Fuente Ramos
	Penalties
	Arturo (penalty scored); Molina (penalty missed); Jimé (penalty scored); González (penalty scored); Martínez (penalty missed); Ruiz (penalty scored); Moreno (penalty missed)		(penalty scored) Iribas; (penalty missed) Soldano; (penalty missed) Salvador; (penalty scored) Anderson; (penalty scored) Diéguez; (penalty scored) Pulido; (penalty scored) Timité

6 January 2022 Round of 32	Fuenlabrada	0–1	Cádiz	Fuenlabrada
16:00 CET (UTC+1)	Konaté (yellow card) 86'	Report	Osmajić (yellow card) 50'; Chust (yellow card) 75'; Alarcón 90+3'	Stadium: Fernando Torres; Referee: Jesús Gil Manzano
