= List of Spanish football transfers summer 2020 =

This is a list of Spanish football transfers for the summer sale prior to the 2020–21 season of La Liga. Only moves from La Liga are listed.

Due to the COVID-19 pandemic and its effects on sports leagues worldwide, FIFA announced that the summer transfer window opening date will remain the same under certain conditions regarding original squad involvement. However, local football federations were allowed to modify the window to their convenience. On 8 June 2020, the RFEF and La Liga agreed to start the window on 4 August and end on 5 October due to the 2019–20 La Liga season concluding on 19 July after hiatus.

Although a few transfers were announced prior to the starting date, the transferred players will not officially become part of their new club until the window's opening. New signings that were originally included in rosters for the post-hiatus 2019–20 UEFA Champions league and Europa League knockout phases went on to play the competition with their former club by contract, they were ready for use at their new club once the tournaments concluded. All loan spells ending on 30 June 2020 were extended until the rescheduled end of their clubs' respective 2019–20 season.

Players without a club can join one at any time, either during or in between transfer windows. Clubs below La Liga level can also sign players on loan at any time. If needed, clubs can sign a goalkeeper on an emergency loan, if all others are unavailable.

== Alavés ==
Manager: (Spain) Pablo Machín (1st season)

=== In ===
| Date | Player | From | Type | Fee | Ref |
|---|---|---|---|---|---|
| 30 June 2020 | (Sweden) John Guidetti | (Germany) Hannover 96 | Loan return | | |
| 30 June 2020 | (Benin) Olivier Verdon | (Belgium) Eupen | Loan return | | |
| 21 July 2020 | (Spain) Adrián Diéguez | Alcorcón | Loan return | | |
| 21 July 2020 | (Spain) Saúl García | Rayo Vallecano | Loan return | | |
| 21 July 2020 | (Argentina) Ramón Miérez | Tenerife | Loan return | | |
| 21 July 2020 | (Spain) Javi Muñoz | Tenerife | Loan return | | |
| 27 July 2020 | (Ghana) Patrick Twumasi | (Turkey) Gazişehir Gaziantep | Loan return | | |
| 4 August 2020 | (Bosnia and Herzegovina) Ermedin Demirović | (Switzerland) St. Gallen | Loan return | | |
| 8 August 2020 | (Angola) Anderson Emanuel | Fuenlabrada | Loan return | | |
| 17 August 2020 | (Spain) Burgui | Zaragoza | Loan return | | |
| 17 August 2020 | (Spain) Antonio Sivera | Almería | Loan return | | |
| 23 August 2020 | (Brazil) Deyverson | (Brazil) Palmeiras | Loan | | |
| 27 August 2020 | (Argentina) Rodrigo Battaglia | (Portugal) Sporting CP | Loan | | |
| 29 August 2020 | (Spain) Carlos Isaac | Atlético Madrid B | Transfer | Free | |
| 11 September 2020 | (France) Florian Lejeune | (England) Newcastle United | Loan | | |
| 3 October 2020 | (Portugal) Tomás Tavares | (Portugal) Benfica | Loan | | |
| 4 October 2020 | (Spain) Jota | (England) Aston Villa | Transfer | Free | |

=== Out ===
| Date | Player | To | Type | Fee | Ref |
|---|---|---|---|---|---|
| 20 July 2020 | (Scotland) Oliver Burke | (England) West Bromwich Albion | Loan return | | |
| 20 July 2020 | (Spain) Víctor Camarasa | Real Betis | Loan return | | |
| 20 July 2020 | (Serbia) Ljubomir Fejsa | (Portugal) Benfica | Loan return | | |
| 20 July 2020 | (Argentina) Lisandro Magallán | (Netherlands) Ajax | Loan return | | |
| 20 July 2020 | (Spain) Roberto | (England) West Ham United | Loan return | | |
| 20 July 2020 | (Spain) Aleix Vidal | Sevilla | Loan return | | |
| 4 August 2020 | (Bosnia and Herzegovina) Ermedin Demirović | (Germany) SC Freiburg | Transfer | €3.7M | |
| 27 August 2020 | (Argentina) Ramón Miérez | (Croatia) Osijek | Loan | | |
| 29 August 2020 | (Spain) Carlos Isaac | Albacete | Loan | | |
| 1 September 2020 | (Angola) Anderson Emanuel | (Bolivia) Bolívar | Transfer | Undisclosed | |
| 4 September 2020 | (Panama) José Luis Rodríguez | Lugo | Loan | | |
| 4 September 2020 | (Ghana) Patrick Twumasi | (Germany) Hannover 96 | Transfer | €700K | |
| 4 September 2020 | (Benin) Olivier Verdon | (Bulgaria) Ludogorets Razgrad | Loan | | |
| 15 September 2020 | (Spain) Adrián Diéguez | Fuenlabrada | Transfer | Undisclosed | |
| 18 September 2020 | (Spain) Javi Muñoz | Mirandés | Loan | | |
| 28 September 2020 | (Spain) Saúl García | Sporting Gijón | Loan | | |
| 30 September 2020 | (Cameroon) Jeando Fuchs | (Scotland) Dundee United | Transfer | Undisclosed | |
| 3 October 2020 | (Spain) Ismael Gutiérrez | Real Betis | Loan return | | |
| 5 October 2020 | (Spain) Rafa Navarro | (Croatia) NK Istra | Loan | | |

== Athletic Bilbao ==
Manager: (Spain) Gaizka Garitano (3rd season)

=== In ===
| Date | Player | From | Type | Fee | Ref |
|---|---|---|---|---|---|
| 30 June 2020 | (Romania) Cristian Ganea | (Romania) Viitorul Constanța | Loan return | | |
| 8 August 2020 | (Spain) Peru Nolaskoain | Deportivo La Coruña | Loan return | | |
| 24 August 2020 | (Spain) Andoni López | Elche | Loan return | | |
| 2 October 2020 | (Spain) Álex Berenguer | (Italy) Torino | Transfer | €10.5M | |

=== Out ===
| Date | Player | To | Type | Fee | Ref |
|---|---|---|---|---|---|
| 20 May 2020 | (Spain) Aritz Aduriz | Retired | | | |
| 14 August 2020 | (Romania) Cristian Ganea | (Greece) Aris | Transfer | Free | |
| 1 September 2020 | (Spain) Andoni López | Logroñés | Transfer | Free | |
| 21 September 2020 | (Spain) Mikel San José | (England) Birmingham City | Transfer | Free | |
| 2 October 2020 | (Spain) Gaizka Larrazabal | Zaragoza | Transfer | Free | |
| 13 November 2020 | (Spain) Beñat | (Australia) Macarthur FC | Transfer | Free | |

== Atlético Madrid ==
Manager: (Argentina) Diego Simeone (10th season)

=== In ===
| Date | Player | From | Type | Fee | Ref |
|---|---|---|---|---|---|
| 30 June 2020 | (Brazil) Caio Henrique | (Brazil) Grêmio | Loan return | | |
| 26 July 2020 | (Argentina) Nehuén Pérez | (Portugal) Famalicão | Loan return | | |
| 7 August 2020 | (Croatia) Nikola Kalinić | (Italy) Roma | Loan return | | |
| 8 August 2020 | (Spain) Víctor Mollejo | Deportivo La Coruña | Loan return | | |
| 8 August 2020 | (Spain) Javi Montero | Deportivo La Coruña | Loan return | | |
| 14 August 2020 | (Spain) Álvaro Morata | (England) Chelsea | Buyout clause | €56M | |
| 20 August 2020 | (Croatia) Ivo Grbić | (Croatia) Lokomotiva | Transfer | €3.5M | |
| 8 September 2020 | (Belgium) Yannick Carrasco | (China) Dalian Professional | Buyout clause | €29.7M | |
| 23 September 2020 | (Uruguay) Luis Suárez | Barcelona | Transfer | Free | |
| 5 October 2020 | (Uruguay) Lucas Torreira | (England) Arsenal | Loan | | |
| 3 November 2020 | (Central African Republic) Geoffrey Kondogbia | Valencia | Transfer | €15M | |

=== Out ===
| Date | Player | To | Type | Fee | Ref |
|---|---|---|---|---|---|
| 20 August 2020 | (Spain) Antonio Adán | (Portugal) Sporting CP | Transfer | Free | |
| 27 August 2020 | (Brazil) Caio Henrique | (France) Monaco | Transfer | €8M | |
| 30 August 2020 | (Spain) Diego Conde | Leganés | Loan | | |
| 30 August 2020 | (Spain) Cedric Teguía | Oviedo | Loan | | |
| 31 August 2020 | (Spain) Darío Poveda | Getafe | Loan | | |
| 2 September 2020 | (Spain) Javi Montero | (Turkey) Beşiktaş | Loan | | |
| 22 September 2020 | (Spain) Álvaro Morata | (Italy) Juventus | Loan | €10M | |
| 24 September 2020 | (Colombia) Santiago Arias | (Germany) Bayer Leverkusen | Loan | €3M | |
| 1 October 2020 | (Spain) Rodrigo Riquelme | (England) AFC Bournemouth | Loan | | |
| 5 October 2020 | (Croatia) Nikola Kalinić | (Italy) Hellas Verona | Transfer | Undisclosed | |
| 5 October 2020 | (Spain) Víctor Mollejo | Getafe | Loan | | |
| 5 October 2020 | (Ghana) Thomas Partey | (England) Arsenal | Transfer | €50M | |
| 5 October 2020 | (Argentina) Nehuén Pérez | Granada | Loan | | |

== Barcelona ==
Manager: (Netherlands) Ronald Koeman (1st season)

=== In ===
| Date | Player | From | Type | Fee | Ref |
|---|---|---|---|---|---|
| 30 June 2020 | (Spain) Oriol Busquets | (Netherlands) Twente | Loan return | | |
| 30 June 2020 | (Spain) Juan Miranda | (Germany) Schalke 04 | Loan return | | |
| 30 June 2020 | (France) Jean-Clair Todibo | (Germany) Schalke 04 | Loan return | | |
| 30 June 2020 | (Senegal) Moussa Wagué | (France) Nice | Loan return | | |
| 20 July 2020 | (Spain) Carles Aleñá | Real Betis | Loan return | | |
| 20 July 2020 | (Brazil) Rafinha | Celta Vigo | Loan return | | |
| 15 August 2020 | (Brazil) Matheus Fernandes | (Brazil) Palmeiras | Transfer | €7M | |
| 15 August 2020 | (Spain) Pedri | Las Palmas | Transfer | €5M | |
| 15 August 2020 | (Bosnia and Herzegovina) Miralem Pjanić | (Italy) Juventus | Transfer | €65M | |
| 15 August 2020 | (Portugal) Francisco Trincão | (Portugal) Braga | Transfer | €31M | |
| 24 August 2020 | (Brazil) Philippe Coutinho | (Germany) Bayern Munich | Loan return | | |
| 1 October 2020 | (United States) Sergiño Dest | (Netherlands) Ajax | Transfer | €21M | |

=== Out ===
| Date | Player | To | Type | Fee | Ref |
|---|---|---|---|---|---|
| 15 August 2020 | (Turkey) Arda Turan | (Turkey) Galatasaray | Transfer | Free | |
| 15 August 2020 | (Spain) Marc Cucurella | Getafe | Buyout clause | €10M | |
| 15 August 2020 | (Spain) Carles Pérez | (Italy) Roma | Buyout clause | €11M | |
| 15 August 2020 | (Brazil) Arthur | (Italy) Juventus | Transfer | €72M | |
| 1 September 2020 | (Croatia) Ivan Rakitić | Sevilla | Transfer | €1.5M | |
| 21 September 2020 | (Senegal) Moussa Wagué | (Greece) PAOK | Loan | | |
| 22 September 2020 | (Chile) Arturo Vidal | (Italy) Inter Milan | Transfer | €1M | |
| 23 September 2020 | (Portugal) Nélson Semedo | (England) Wolverhampton Wanderers | Transfer | €30M | |
| 23 September 2020 | (Uruguay) Luis Suárez | Atlético Madrid | Transfer | Free | |
| 5 October 2020 | (Spain) Juan Miranda | Real Betis | Loan | | |
| 5 October 2020 | (Brazil) Rafinha | (France) Paris Saint-Germain | Transfer | Free | |
| 5 October 2020 | (France) Jean-Clair Todibo | (Portugal) Benfica | Loan | €2M | |

== Cádiz ==
Manager: (Spain) Álvaro Cervera (6th season)

=== In ===
| Date | Player | From | Type | Fee | Ref |
|---|---|---|---|---|---|
| 30 June 2020 | (Panama) Cristian Martínez | Recreativo | Loan return | | |
| 30 June 2020 | (Spain) Matos | (Netherlands) Twente | Loan return | | |
| 20 July 2020 | (Serbia) Đorđe Jovanović | Cartagena | Loan return | | |
| 21 July 2020 | (Spain) David Carmona | Racing Santander | Loan return | | |
| 21 July 2020 | (Spain) Javi Navarro | Ponferradina | Loan return | | |
| 21 July 2020 | (Spain) David Querol | Albacete | Loan return | | |
| 21 July 2020 | (Spain) Dani Romera | Alcorcón | Loan return | | |
| 21 July 2020 | (Spain) Sergio Sánchez | Albacete | Loan return | | |
| 24 July 2020 | (Spain) Daniel Sotres | Salamanca UDS | Transfer | Free | |
| 4 August 2020 | (Spain) Álvaro Giménez | (England) Birmingham City | Buyout clause | €2.7M | |
| 4 August 2020 | (Serbia) Filip Malbašić | Tenerife | Buyout clause | €1M | |
| 4 August 2020 | (Spain) David Mayoral | UCAM Murcia | Transfer | Free | |
| 4 August 2020 | (Spain) Nano | Eibar | Buyout clause | €1.4M | |
| 4 August 2020 | (Spain) Álvaro Negredo | (United Arab Emirates) Al-Nasr | Transfer | Free | |
| 4 August 2020 | (Spain) Gaspar Panadero | (United Arab Emirates) Al Wahda | Transfer | Free | |
| 4 August 2020 | (Spain) Daniel Sotres | Salamanca | Transfer | Free | |
| 6 August 2020 | (Spain) Iván Alejo | Getafe | Buyout clause | €3M | |
| 8 August 2020 | (Spain) Caye Quintana | Fuenlabrada | Loan return | | |
| 17 August 2020 | (Spain) Jorge Pombo | Zaragoza | Buyout clause | €1.2M | |
| 24 August 2020 | (Honduras) Anthony Lozano | Girona | Buyout clause | €2.5M | |
| 24 August 2020 | (Spain) Brian Oliván | Girona | Loan return | | |
| 25 August 2020 | (Denmark) Jens Jønsson | (Turkey) Konyaspor | Transfer | Free | |
| 25 August 2020 | (Argentina) Jeremías Ledesma | (Argentina) Rosario Central | Loan | | |
| 5 October 2020 | (Netherlands) Bobby Adekanye | (Italy) Lazio | Loan | | |
| 5 October 2020 | (Spain) Pedro Alcalá | Girona | Transfer | Free | |
| 5 October 2020 | (Spain) Jairo Izquierdo | Girona | Loan | | |

=== Out ===
| Date | Player | To | Type | Fee | Ref |
|---|---|---|---|---|---|
| 8 August 2020 | (Spain) Sergio Sánchez | Unattached | Released | | |
| 7 September 2020 | (Spain) David Mayoral | (Romania) Hermannstadt | Loan | | |
| 7 September 2020 | (Spain) Caye Quintana | Málaga | Loan | | |
| 9 September 2020 | (Spain) Brian Oliván | Mallorca | Transfer | Free | |
| 16 September 2020 | (Spain) Matos | Málaga | Loan | | |
| 16 September 2020 | (Spain) Javi Navarro | Albacete | Loan | | |
| 22 September 2020 | (Spain) Dani Romera | Ponferradina | Transfer | Free | |
| 24 September 2020 | (Spain) Daniel Sotres | Rayo Majadahonda | Loan | | |
| 2 October 2020 | (Spain) José Manuel Jurado | Unattached | Released | | |
| 3 October 2020 | (Spain) David Carmona | Real Betis B | Transfer | Free | |
| 5 October 2020 | (Spain) Alberto Cifuentes | Retired | | | |
| 5 October 2020 | (Serbia) Đorđe Jovanović | Unattached | Released | | |
| 5 October 2020 | (Spain) Gaspar Panadero | Ponferradina | Loan | | |
| 5 October 2020 | (Spain) David Querol | Unattached | Released | | |
| 5 October 2020 | (Spain) Edu Ramos | Marbella | Transfer | Free | |
| 5 October 2020 | (Switzerland) Jean-Pierre Rhyner | Cartagena | Loan | | |

== Celta Vigo ==
Manager: (Spain) Óscar García (2nd season)

=== In ===
| Date | Player | From | Type | Fee | Ref |
|---|---|---|---|---|---|
| 21 July 2020 | (Slovakia) Róbert Mazáň | Tenerife | Loan return | | |
| 4 August 2020 | (Peru) Renato Tapia | (Netherlands) Feyenoord | Transfer | Free | |
| 4 August 2020 | (Spain) Álvaro Vadillo | Granada | Transfer | Free | |
| 7 August 2020 | (Turkey) Emre Mor | (Greece) Olympiacos | Loan return | | |
| 15 August 2020 | (Spain) Miguel Baeza | Real Madrid B | Transfer | €2.5M | |
| 17 August 2020 | (Spain) David Costas | Almería | Loan return | | |
| 24 August 2020 | (Spain) Jozabed | Girona | Loan return | | |
| 16 September 2020 | (Colombia) Jeison Murillo | (Italy) Sampdoria | Loan | | |

=== Out ===
| Date | Player | To | Type | Fee | Ref |
|---|---|---|---|---|---|
| 20 July 2020 | (Croatia) Filip Bradarić | (Italy) Cagliari | Loan return | | |
| 20 July 2020 | (Spain) Pape Cheikh | (France) Lyon | Loan return | | |
| 20 July 2020 | (Colombia) Jeison Murillo | (Italy) Sampdoria | Loan return | | |
| 20 July 2020 | (Brazil) Rafinha | Barcelona | Loan return | | |
| 20 July 2020 | (Russia) Fyodor Smolov | (Russia) Lokomotiv Moscow | Loan return | | |
| 27 August 2020 | (Spain) Juan Hernández | Sabadell | Loan | | |
| 7 September 2020 | (Denmark) Pione Sisto | (Denmark) Midtjylland | Transfer | €2.5M | |
| 11 September 2020 | (Uruguay) Gabriel Fernández | Zaragoza | Loan | | |
| 11 September 2020 | (Slovenia) Róbert Mazáň | (Czech Republic) Mladá Boleslav | Transfer | Free | |
| 16 August 2020 | (Spain) Jozabed | Málaga | Loan | | |
| 5 October 2020 | (Spain) Álvaro Vadillo | Espanyol | Loan | | |

== Eibar ==
Manager: (Spain) José Luis Mendilibar (6th season)

=== In ===
| Date | Player | From | Type | Fee | Ref |
|---|---|---|---|---|---|
| 20 July 2020 | (Spain) José Antonio Martínez | Granada | Loan return | | |
| 21 July 2020 | (Spain) Asier Benito | Ponferradina | Loan return | | |
| 21 July 2020 | (Spain) Roberto Olabe | Extremadura | Loan return | | |
| 24 August 2020 | (Spain) Jordi Calavera | Girona | Loan return | | |
| 29 August 2020 | (Poland) Damian Kądzior | (Croatia) Dinamo Zagreb | Transfer | €2M | |
| 4 September 2020 | (Spain) Recio | Leganés | Loan | | |
| 12 September 2020 | (Portugal) Kévin Rodrigues | Real Sociedad | Loan | | |
| 16 September 2020 | (Japan) Yoshinori Muto | (England) Newcastle United | Loan | | |
| 5 October 2020 | (Spain) Bryan Gil | Sevilla | Loan | | |
| 5 October 2020 | (Spain) Alejandro Pozo | Sevilla | Loan | | |

=== Out ===
| Date | Player | To | Type | Fee | Ref |
|---|---|---|---|---|---|
| 20 July 2020 | (Uruguay) Sebastián Cristóforo | (Italy) Fiorentina | Loan return | | |
| 20 July 2020 | (Argentina) Pablo de Blasis | Unattached | End of contract | | |
| 20 July 2020 | (Spain) Iván Ramis | Retired | | | |
| 4 August 2020 | (Brazil) Charles | Pontevedra | Transfer | Free | |
| 4 August 2020 | (Argentina) Gonzalo Escalante | (Italy) Lazio | Transfer | Free | |
| 4 August 2020 | (Spain) Nano | Cádiz | Buyout clause | €1.4M | |
| 4 August 2020 | (Chile) Fabián Orellana | Valladolid | Transfer | Free | |
| 4 September 2020 | (Spain) Jordi Calavera | Girona | Transfer | Free | |
| 8 September 2020 | (Spain) Asier Benito | Numancia | Loan | | |
| 5 October 2020 | (Spain) Álvaro Tejero | Zaragoza | Loan | | |

== Elche ==
Manager: (Argentina) Jorge Almirón (1st season)

=== In ===
| Date | Player | From | Type | Fee | Ref |
|---|---|---|---|---|---|
| 15 September 2020 | (Colombia) Jeison Lucumí | (Mexico) Tigres UANL | Transfer | Free | |
| 15 September 2020 | (Argentina) Juan Sánchez Miño | (Argentina) Independiente | Transfer | Free | |
| 16 September 2020 | (Spain) Tete Morente | Málaga | Transfer | €500K | |
| 20 September 2020 | (Spain) Raúl Guti | Zaragoza | Transfer | €5M | |
| 21 September 2020 | (Argentina) Lucas Boyé | (Italy) Torino | Loan | | |
| 22 September 2020 | (Spain) Cifu | Málaga | Transfer | Free | |
| 25 September 2020 | (Spain) Luismi | Valladolid | Transfer | Free | |
| 30 September 2020 | (Mali) Youssouf Koné | (France) Lyon | Loan | | |
| 4 October 2020 | (Spain) Antonio Barragán | Real Betis | Transfer | Free | |
| 5 October 2020 | (Argentina) Guido Carrillo | (England) Southampton | Transfer | Free | |
| 5 October 2020 | (Argentina) Iván Marcone | (Argentina) Boca Juniors | Loan | | |
| 5 October 2020 | (Argentina) Emiliano Rigoni | (Russia) Zenit Saint Petersburg | Loan | | |
| 5 October 2020 | (Argentina) Diego Rodríguez | (Argentina) Defensa y Justicia | Loan | | |
| 9 October 2020 | (Spain) Diego González | Málaga | Transfer | Free | |

=== Out ===
| Date | Player | To | Type | Fee | Ref |
|---|---|---|---|---|---|
| 24 August 2020 | (Spain) Andoni López | Athletic Bilbao | Loan return | | |
| 24 August 2020 | (Spain) Miguel San Román | Atlético Madrid B | Loan return | | |
| 26 August 2020 | (Spain) Tekio | (Greece) Volos | Transfer | Free | |
| 27 August 2020 | (Spain) Iván Sánchez | (England) Birmingham City | Transfer | Free | |
| 29 August 2020 | (Brazil) Jonathas | (United Arab Emirates) Sharjah | Transfer | Free | |
| 30 August 2020 | (Spain) Juan Cruz | Osasuna | Transfer | €2.75M | |
| 7 September 2020 | (Spain) Óscar Gil | Espanyol | Transfer | €500K | |
| 21 September 2020 | (Spain) Manuel Sánchez | Real Ávila | Transfer | Free | |
| 2 October 2020 | (Spain) Claudio Medina | Burgos | Transfer | Free | |
| 5 October 2020 | (Spain) Ramón Folch | Tenerife | Loan | | |

== Getafe ==
Manager: (Spain) José Bordalás (5th season)

=== In ===
| Date | Player | From | Type | Fee | Ref |
|---|---|---|---|---|---|
| 20 July 2020 | (Spain) Raúl García | Valladolid | Loan return | | |
| 21 July 2020 | (Scotland) Jack Harper | Alcorcón | Loan return | | |
| 21 July 2020 | (Spain) Rubén Yáñez | Huesca | Loan return | | |
| 8 August 2020 | (Spain) Miguel Ángel | Fuenlabrada | Loan return | | |
| 12 August 2020 | (Turkey) Enes Ünal | Villarreal | Transfer | €9M | |
| 14 August 2020 | (Colombia) Cucho Hernández | (England) Watford | Loan | | |
| 15 August 2020 | (Spain) Marc Cucurella | Barcelona | Buyout clause | €10M | |
| 24 August 2020 | (Spain) Ignasi Miquel | Girona | Loan return | | |
| 31 August 2020 | (Croatia) Ante Palaversa | (England) Manchester City | Loan | | |
| 31 August 2020 | (Spain) Darío Poveda | Atlético Madrid | Loan | | |
| 5 October 2020 | (Mali) Abdoulay Diaby | (Portugal) Sporting CP | Loan | | |
| 5 October 2020 | (Spain) Víctor Mollejo | Atlético Madrid | Loan | | |

=== Out ===
| Date | Player | To | Type | Fee | Ref |
|---|---|---|---|---|---|
| 6 August 2020 | (Spain) Iván Alejo | Cádiz | Buyout clause | €3M | |
| 6 August 2020 | (Brazil) Deyverson | (Brazil) Palmeiras | Loan return | | |
| 6 August 2020 | (Nigeria) Peter Etebo | (England) Stoke City | Loan return | | |
| 6 August 2020 | (Spain) Enric Gallego | Osasuna | Buyout clause | €2M | |
| 6 August 2020 | (Spain) Jason | Valencia | Loan return | | |
| 6 August 2020 | (Brazil) Kenedy | (England) Chelsea | Loan return | | |
| 6 August 2020 | (Republic of the Congo) Merveil Ndockyt | (Croatia) Osijek | Buyout clause | €550K | |
| 13 August 2020 | (Portugal) Vitorino Antunes | (Portugal) Sporting CP | Transfer | Free | |
| 17 August 2020 | (Spain) José Lazo | Almería | Buyout clause | €4M | |
| 25 August 2020 | (Spain) Jorge Molina | Granada | Transfer | Free | |
| 27 August 2020 | (Spain) Hugo Duro | Real Madrid B | Loan | | |
| 1 September 2020 | (Spain) Álvaro Jiménez | Albacete | Transfer | Free | |
| 16 September 2020 | (Morocco) Fayçal Fajr | (Turkey) Sivasspor | Transfer | Undisclosed | |
| 16 September 2020 | (Spain) Ignasi Miquel | Leganés | Loan | | |
| 27 September 2020 | (Serbia) Filip Manojlović | San Sebastián de los Reyes | Transfer | Free | |
| 5 October 2020 | (Scotland) Jack Harper | Cartagena | Loan | | |
| 5 October 2020 | (Senegal) Amath Ndiaye | Mallorca | Loan | | |

== Granada ==
Manager: (Spain) Diego Martínez (3rd season)

=== In ===
| Date | Player | From | Type | Fee | Ref |
|---|---|---|---|---|---|
| 30 June 2020 | (Spain) José Antonio González | Córdoba | Loan return | | |
| 21 July 2020 | (Spain) Bernardo Cruz | Numancia | Loan return | | |
| 4 August 2020 | (Guadeloupe) Dimitri Foulquier | (England) Watford | Buyout clause | €2M | |
| 4 August 2020 | (Spain) Luis Milla | Tenerife | Transfer | €5M | |
| 7 August 2020 | (France) Maxime Gonalons | (Italy) Roma | Buyout clause | €4M | |
| 18 August 2020 | (Spain) Jesús Vallejo | Real Madrid | Loan | | |
| 25 August 2020 | (Spain) Jorge Molina | Getafe | Transfer | Free | |
| 1 September 2020 | (Spain) Alberto Soro | Real Madrid | Transfer | €2.5M | |
| 8 September 2020 | (Brazil) Kenedy | (England) Chelsea | Loan | | |
| 2 October 2020 | (Colombia) Luis Suárez | (England) Watford | Transfer | €7M | |
| 5 October 2020 | (Argentina) Nehuén Pérez | Atlético Madrid | Loan | | |

=== Out ===
| Date | Player | To | Type | Fee | Ref |
|---|---|---|---|---|---|
| 20 July 2020 | (Portugal) Gil Dias | (France) Monaco | Loan return | | |
| 20 July 2020 | (Spain) Carlos Fernández | Sevilla | Loan return | | |
| 20 July 2020 | (Spain) José Antonio Martínez | Eibar | Loan return | | |
| 20 July 2020 | (Spain) Jesús Vallejo | Real Madrid | Loan return | | |
| 4 August 2020 | (Spain) José Antonio González | Recreativo | Transfer | Free | |
| 4 August 2020 | (Spain) Álvaro Vadillo | Celta Vigo | Transfer | Free | |
| 26 August 2020 | (Spain) Bernardo Cruz | Córdoba | Transfer | Free | |
| 29 September 2020 | (Spain) Álex Martínez | Unattached | Released | | |
| 2 October 2020 | (Spain) Antoñín | Rayo Vallecano | Loan | | |
| 5 October 2020 | (Turkey) İsmail Köybaşı | (Turkey) Çaykur Rizespor | Transfer | Free | |

== Huesca ==
Manager: (Spain) Míchel (2nd season)

=== In ===
| Date | Player | From | Type | Fee | Ref |
|---|---|---|---|---|---|
| 21 July 2020 | (Spain) Joaquín Muñoz | Mirandés | Loan return | | |
| 21 July 2020 | (Spain) Jaime Seoane | Lugo | Loan return | | |
| 26 July 2020 | (Honduras) Jonathan Toro | (Portugal) Tondela | Loan return | | |
| 27 July 2020 | (Turkey) Serdar Gürler | (Turkey) Göztepe | Loan return | | |
| 4 August 2020 | (Spain) Borja García | Girona | Transfer | €2M | |
| 4 August 2020 | (Spain) Pablo Insua | (Germany) Schalke 04 | Buyout clause | Undisclosed | |
| 8 August 2020 | (Serbia) Aleksandar Jovanović | Deportivo La Coruña | Loan return | | |
| 28 August 2020 | (Spain) Andrés Fernández | Villarreal | Transfer | Undisclosed | |
| 3 September 2020 | (Uruguay) Gastón Silva | (Argentina) Independiente | Transfer | Free | |
| 8 September 2020 | (Spain) Pablo Maffeo | (Germany) VfB Stuttgart | Loan | | |
| 17 September 2020 | (Greece) Dimitris Siovas | Leganés | Transfer | €1M | |
| 24 September 2020 | (Spain) Javier Ontiveros | Villarreal | Loan | €650K | |
| 4 October 2020 | (Ivory Coast) Idrissa Doumbia | (Portugal) Sporting CP | Loan | | |
| 5 October 2020 | (Spain) Sandro Ramírez | (England) Everton | Transfer | Undisclosed | |

=== Out ===
| Date | Player | To | Type | Fee | Ref |
|---|---|---|---|---|---|
| 21 July 2020 | (Croatia) Toni Datković | (Croatia) Lokomotiva | Loan return | | |
| 21 July 2020 | (Ivory Coast) Cheick Doukouré | Levante | Loan return | | |
| 21 July 2020 | (Spain) Cristo González | (Italy) Udinese | Loan return | | |
| 21 July 2020 | (Spain) Jordi Mboula | (France) Monaco | Loan return | | |
| 21 July 2020 | (Spain) Miguelón | Villarreal | Loan return | | |
| 21 July 2020 | (Spain) Dani Raba | Villarreal | Loan return | | |
| 21 July 2020 | (Portugal) Josué Sá | (Belgium) Anderlecht | Loan return | | |
| 21 July 2020 | (Spain) Rubén Yáñez | Getafe | Loan return | | |
| 7 August 2020 | (Turkey) Serdar Gürler | (Turkey) Antalyaspor | Transfer | Undisclosed | |
| 16 September 2020 | (Serbia) Aleksandar Jovanović | (Cyprus) Apollon Limassol | Transfer | Free | |
| 2 October 2020 | (Spain) Kike Hermoso | Real Betis B | Transfer | Free | |
| 5 October 2020 | (Spain) Joaquín Muñoz | Málaga | Loan | | |
| 7 October 2020 | (Honduras) Jonathan Toro | (Portugal) Chaves | Transfer | Free | |

== Levante ==
Manager: (Spain) Paco López (4th season)

=== In ===
| Date | Player | From | Type | Fee | Ref |
|---|---|---|---|---|---|
| 21 July 2020 | (Ivory Coast) Cheick Doukouré | Huesca | Loan return | | |
| 21 July 2020 | (Spain) Ivi | Ponferradina | Loan return | | |
| 21 July 2020 | (Spain) Antonio Luna | Rayo Vallecano | Loan return | | |
| 21 July 2020 | (Spain) Fran Manzanara | Ponferradina | Loan return | | |
| 21 July 2020 | (Albania) Armando Sadiku | Málaga | Loan return | | |
| 27 July 2020 | (Spain) Pepelu | (Portugal) Tondela | Loan return | | |
| 4 August 2020 | (Spain) Jorge de Frutos | Real Madrid B | Transfer | €2.5M | |
| 4 August 2020 | (Spain) Dani Gómez | Real Madrid B | Transfer | €2.5M | |
| 4 August 2020 | (Martinique) Mickaël Malsa | Mirandés | Transfer | Free | |
| 4 August 2020 | (Spain) Son | Ponferradina | Transfer | Free | |
| 17 August 2020 | (Ghana) Raphael Dwamena | Zaragoza | Loan return | | |

=== Out ===
| Date | Player | To | Type | Fee | Ref |
|---|---|---|---|---|---|
| 20 July 2020 | (Spain) Iván López | Unattached | End of contract | | |
| 20 July 2020 | (Spain) Borja Mayoral | Real Madrid | Loan return | | |
| 4 August 2020 | (Nigeria) Moses Simon | (France) Nantes | Buyout clause | €5M | |
| 11 August 2020 | (Spain) Bruno González | Valladolid | Transfer | Free | |
| 20 August 2020 | (Ghana) Raphael Dwamena | (Denmark) Vejle BK | Transfer | Free | |
| 1 September 2020 | (Spain) Ivi | (Poland) Raków Częstochowa | Transfer | Free | |
| 5 September 2020 | (Albania) Armando Sadiku | (Turkey) BB Erzurumspor | Transfer | Free | |
| 8 September 2020 | (Spain) Pepelu | (Portugal) Vitória Guimarães | Loan | | |
| 30 September 2020 | (Spain) Antonio Luna | Girona | Transfer | Free | |
| 2 October 2020 | (Spain) Pablo Martínez | Mirandés | Loan | | |
| 4 October 2020 | (Spain) Fran Manzanara | Numancia | Transfer | Free | |
| 5 October 2020 | (Spain) Arturo Molina | Castellón | Loan | | |
| 13 October 2020 | (Portugal) Hernâni | (Saudi Arabia) Al Wehda | Loan | | |

== Osasuna ==
Manager: (Spain) Jagoba Arrasate (3rd season)

=== In ===
| Date | Player | From | Type | Fee | Ref |
|---|---|---|---|---|---|
| 21 July 2020 | (Spain) Jaume Grau | Lugo | Loan return | | |
| 21 July 2020 | (Spain) Antonio Otegui | Numancia | Loan return | | |
| 21 July 2020 | (Spain) Luis Perea | Alcorcón | Loan return | | |
| 21 July 2020 | (Spain) Juan Villar | Rayo Vallecano | Loan return | | |
| 4 August 2020 | (Spain) Raúl Navas | Real Sociedad | Buyout clause | €250K | |
| 6 August 2020 | (Spain) Enric Gallego | Getafe | Buyout clause | €2M | |
| 7 August 2020 | (Spain) Lucas Torró | (Germany) Eintracht Frankfurt | Transfer | €2M | |
| 24 August 2020 | (Spain) Brandon Thomas | Girona | Loan return | | |
| 30 August 2020 | (Spain) Juan Cruz | Elche | Transfer | €2.75M | |
| 13 September 2020 | (Argentina) Jonathan Calleri | (Uruguay) Deportivo Maldonado | Loan | | |
| 20 September 2020 | (Spain) Jony | (Italy) Lazio | Loan | | |
| 5 October 2020 | (Croatia) Ante Budimir | Mallorca | Loan | | |

=== Out ===
| Date | Player | To | Type | Fee | Ref |
|---|---|---|---|---|---|
| 20 July 2020 | (Spain) José Arnaiz | Leganés | Loan return | | |
| 20 July 2020 | (Ecuador) Pervis Estupiñán | (England) Watford | Loan return | | |
| 20 July 2020 | (Spain) Toni Lato | Valencia | Loan return | | |
| 19 August 2020 | (Spain) Fran Mérida | Espanyol | Transfer | Free | |
| 23 August 2020 | (Spain) Antonio Otegui | Badajoz | Loan | | |
| 24 August 2020 | (Spain) Jaume Grau | (Portugal) Tondela | Loan | | |
| 24 August 2020 | (Spain) Robert Ibáñez | Leganés | Loan | | |
| 27 August 2020 | (Spain) Luis Perea | Leganés | Transfer | €3M | |
| 28 August 2020 | (Spain) Iván Barbero | Alcorcón | Loan | | |
| 5 October 2020 | (Spain) Marc Cardona | Mallorca | Loan | | |

== Real Betis ==
Manager: (Chile) Manuel Pellegrini (1st season)

=== In ===
| Date | Player | From | Type | Fee | Ref |
|---|---|---|---|---|---|
| 30 June 2020 | (Spain) Liberto Beltrán | Lleida Esportiu | Loan return | | |
| 20 July 2020 | (Spain) Víctor Camarasa | Alavés | Loan return | | |
| 20 July 2020 | (Spain) Aitor Ruibal | Leganés | Loan return | | |
| 21 July 2020 | (Colombia) Juanjo Narváez | Las Palmas | Loan return | | |
| 24 July 2020 | (Spain) Julio Gracia | Badajoz | Loan return | | |
| 3 August 2020 | (Paraguay) Antonio Sanabria | (Italy) Genoa | Loan return | | |
| 17 August 2020 | (Spain) Francis Guerrero | Almería | Loan return | | |
| 17 August 2020 | (Cameroon) Wilfrid Kaptoum | Almería | Loan return | | |
| 25 August 2020 | (Spain) Martín Montoya | (England) Brighton & Hove Albion | Transfer | Free | |
| 30 August 2020 | (Chile) Claudio Bravo | (England) Manchester City | Transfer | Free | |
| 31 August 2020 | (Spain) Víctor Ruiz | (Turkey) Beşiktaş | Transfer | Free | |
| 3 October 2020 | (Spain) Ismael Gutiérrez | Alavés | Loan return | | |
| 5 October 2020 | (Spain) Juan Miranda | Barcelona | Loan | | |

=== Out ===
| Date | Player | To | Type | Fee | Ref |
|---|---|---|---|---|---|
| 20 July 2020 | (Spain) Carles Aleñá | Barcelona | Loan return | | |
| 20 July 2020 | (Spain) Alfonso Pedraza | Villarreal | Loan return | | |
| 4 August 2020 | (Argentina) Giovani Lo Celso | (England) Tottenham Hotspur | Buyout clause | €32M | |
| 18 August 2020 | (Spain) Liberto Beltrán | Albacete | Transfer | Free | |
| 18 August 2020 | (Morocco) Zouhair Feddal | (Portugal) Sporting CP | Transfer | Free | |
| 19 August 2020 | (Spain) Javi García | (Portugal) Boavista | Transfer | Free | |
| 2 September 2020 | (Spain) Rober | Las Palmas | Loan | | |
| 3 September 2020 | (Spain) Edgar González | Oviedo | Loan | | |
| 4 September 2020 | (Colombia) Juanjo Narváez | Zaragoza | Transfer | Free | |
| 3 October 2020 | (Spain) Ismael Gutiérrez | Atlético Madrid B | Transfer | €1M | |
| 4 October 2020 | (Spain) Antonio Barragán | Elche | Transfer | Free | |
| 5 October 2020 | (Cameroon) Wilfrid Kaptoum | Unattached | Released | | |
| 19 October 2020 | (Spain) Francis Guerrero | Unattached | Released | | |

== Real Madrid ==
Manager: (France) Zinedine Zidane (3rd season)

=== In ===
| Date | Player | From | Type | Fee | Ref |
|---|---|---|---|---|---|
| 30 June 2020 | (Morocco) Achraf Hakimi | (Germany) Borussia Dortmund | Loan return | | |
| 20 July 2020 | (Japan) Takefusa Kubo | Mallorca | Loan return | | |
| 20 July 2020 | (Spain) Borja Mayoral | Levante | Loan return | | |
| 20 July 2020 | (Norway) Martin Ødegaard | Real Sociedad | Loan return | | |
| 20 July 2020 | (Spain) Óscar Rodríguez | Leganés | Loan return | | |
| 20 July 2020 | (Spain) Jesús Vallejo | Granada | Loan return | | |
| 21 July 2020 | (Ukraine) Andriy Lunin | Oviedo | Loan return | | |
| 21 July 2020 | (France) Luca Zidane | Racing Santander | Loan return | | |
| 22 August 2020 | (Spain) Sergio Reguilón | Sevilla | Loan return | | |
| 24 August 2020 | (Spain) Álvaro Odriozola | (Germany) Bayern Munich | Loan return | | |

=== Out ===
| Date | Player | To | Type | Fee | Ref |
|---|---|---|---|---|---|
| 8 August 2020 | (France) Alphonse Areola | (France) Paris Saint-Germain | Loan return | | |
| 8 August 2020 | (Spain) Javi Sánchez | Valladolid | Buyout clause | €3M | |
| 10 August 2020 | (Japan) Takefusa Kubo | Villarreal | Loan | €2.5M | |
| 18 August 2020 | (Spain) Jesús Vallejo | Granada | Loan | | |
| 19 August 2020 | (Brazil) Reinier | (Germany) Borussia Dortmund | Loan | | |
| 22 August 2020 | (Morocco) Achraf Hakimi | (Italy) Inter Milan | Transfer | €45M | |
| 29 August 2020 | (Spain) Óscar Rodríguez | Sevilla | Transfer | €13.5M | |
| 1 September 2020 | (Spain) Alberto Soro | Granada | Transfer | €2.5M | |
| 4 September 2020 | (Spain) Brahim Díaz | (Italy) Milan | Loan | | |
| 7 September 2020 | (Colombia) James Rodríguez | (England) Everton | Transfer | Free | |
| 19 September 2020 | (Wales) Gareth Bale | (England) Tottenham Hotspur | Loan | | |
| 19 September 2020 | (Spain) Sergio Reguilón | (England) Tottenham Hotspur | Transfer | €30M | |
| 2 October 2020 | (Spain) Borja Mayoral | (Italy) Roma | Loan | | |
| 5 October 2020 | (France) Luca Zidane | Rayo Vallecano | Transfer | Free | |

== Real Sociedad ==
Manager: (Spain) Imanol Alguacil (3rd season)

=== In ===
| Date | Player | From | Type | Fee | Ref |
|---|---|---|---|---|---|
| 30 June 2020 | (Spain) Jon Bautista | (Belgium) Eupen | Loan return | | |
| 30 June 2020 | (Argentina) Gerónimo Rulli | (France) Montpellier | Loan return | | |
| 20 July 2020 | (Portugal) Kévin Rodrigues | Leganés | Loan return | | |
| 21 July 2020 | (Spain) Jon Guridi | Mirandés | Loan return | | |
| 21 July 2020 | (Spain) Martín Merquelanz | Albacete | Loan return | | |
| 21 July 2020 | (France) Modibo Sagnan | Mirandés | Loan return | | |
| 17 August 2020 | (Spain) David Silva | (England) Manchester City | Transfer | Free | |

=== Out ===
| Date | Player | To | Type | Fee | Ref |
|---|---|---|---|---|---|
| 20 July 2020 | (Norway) Martin Ødegaard | Real Madrid | Loan return | | |
| 20 July 2020 | (Spain) David Zurutuza | Retired | | | |
| 4 August 2020 | (Spain) Raúl Navas | Osasuna | Buyout clause | €250K | |
| 4 September 2020 | (Argentina) Gerónimo Rulli | Villarreal | Transfer | €5M | |
| 12 September 2020 | (Portugal) Kévin Rodrigues | Eibar | Loan | | |
| 24 September 2020 | (Spain) Diego Llorente | (England) Leeds United | Transfer | €20M | |
| 30 September 2020 | (France) Naïs Djouahra | Mirandés | Loan | | |
| 1 October 2020 | (Spain) Andoni Zubiaurre | Cultural Leonesa | Loan | | |

== Sevilla ==
Manager: (Spain) Julen Lopetegui (2nd season)

=== In ===
| Date | Player | From | Type | Fee | Ref |
|---|---|---|---|---|---|
| 30 June 2020 | (Georgia (country)) Giorgi Aburjania | (Netherlands) Twente | Loan return | | |
| 30 June 2020 | (France) Joris Gnagnon | (France) Rennes | Loan return | | |
| 30 June 2020 | (Spain) Marc Gual | Real Madrid B | Loan return | | |
| 20 July 2020 | (France) Ibrahim Amadou | Leganés | Loan return | | |
| 20 July 2020 | (France) Sébastien Corchia | Espanyol | Loan return | | |
| 20 July 2020 | (Spain) Carlos Fernández | Granada | Loan return | | |
| 20 July 2020 | (Spain) Bryan Gil | Leganés | Loan return | | |
| 20 July 2020 | (Spain) Roque Mesa | Leganés | Loan return | | |
| 20 July 2020 | (Spain) Alejandro Pozo | Mallorca | Loan return | | |
| 20 July 2020 | (Spain) Juan Soriano | Leganés | Loan return | | |
| 20 July 2020 | (Spain) Aleix Vidal | Alavés | Loan return | | |
| 22 August 2020 | (Spain) Suso | (Italy) Milan | Buyout clause | €21M | |
| 29 August 2020 | (Spain) Óscar Rodríguez | Real Madrid | Transfer | €13.5M | |
| 1 September 2020 | (Croatia) Ivan Rakitić | Barcelona | Transfer | €1.5M | |
| 4 September 2020 | (Morocco) Bono | Girona | Buyout clause | €4M | |
| 14 September 2020 | (Argentina) Marcos Acuña | (Portugal) Sporting CP | Transfer | €10.5M | |
| 5 October 2020 | (Morocco) Oussama Idrissi | (Netherlands) AZ Alkmaar | Transfer | €12M | |
| 5 October 2020 | (Netherlands) Karim Rekik | (Germany) Hertha BSC | Transfer | €2M | |

=== Out ===
| Date | Player | To | Type | Fee | Ref |
|---|---|---|---|---|---|
| 22 August 2020 | (Spain) Sergio Reguilón | Real Madrid | Loan return | | |
| 22 August 2020 | (Argentina) Éver Banega | (Saudi Arabia) Al-Shabab | Transfer | Free | |
| 22 August 2020 | (Denmark) Simon Kjær | (Italy) Milan | Buyout clause | €3.5M | |
| 22 August 2020 | (Portugal) Rony Lopes | (France) Nice | Loan | | |
| 25 August 2020 | (Spain) Juan Berrocal | Mirandés | Loan | | |
| 1 September 2020 | (Spain) Marc Gual | Alcorcón | Transfer | Undisclosed | |
| 4 September 2020 | (Spain) Sergio Rico | (France) Paris Saint-Germain | Buyout clause | €6M | |
| 11 September 2020 | (Spain) José Alonso Lara | Deportivo La Coruña | Loan | | |
| 20 September 2020 | (Georgia (country)) Giorgi Aburjania | Oviedo | Transfer | Free | |
| 28 September 2020 | (Spain) Juan Soriano | Málaga | Loan | | |
| 5 October 2020 | (France) Ibrahim Amadou | (France) Angers | Loan | | |
| 5 October 2020 | (France) Sébastien Corchia | (France) Nantes | Transfer | Free | |
| 5 October 2020 | (Spain) Bryan Gil | Eibar | Loan | | |
| 5 October 2020 | (Spain) Roque Mesa | Valladolid | Transfer | Free | |
| 5 October 2020 | (Spain) Alejandro Pozo | Eibar | Loan | | |

== Valencia ==
Manager: (Spain) Javi Gracia (1st season)

=== In ===
| Date | Player | From | Type | Fee | Ref |
|---|---|---|---|---|---|
| 30 June 2020 | (Spain) Álex Carbonell | (Netherlands) Fortuna Sittard | Loan return | | |
| 20 July 2020 | (Spain) Toni Lato | Osasuna | Loan return | | |
| 27 July 2020 | (Spain) Álex Centelles | (Portugal) Famalicão | Loan return | | |
| 27 July 2020 | (Serbia) Uroš Račić | (Portugal) Famalicão | Loan return | | |
| 6 August 2020 | (Spain) Jason | Getafe | Loan return | | |
| 17 August 2020 | (Spain) Álex Blanco | Zaragoza | Loan return | | |

=== Out ===
| Date | Player | To | Type | Fee | Ref |
|---|---|---|---|---|---|
| 20 July 2020 | (Spain) Jaume Costa | Villarreal | Loan return | | |
| 20 July 2020 | (Italy) Alessandro Florenzi | (Italy) Roma | Loan return | | |
| 20 July 2020 | (Argentina) Ezequiel Garay | Unattached | Released | | |
| 4 August 2020 | (Spain) Ferran Torres | (England) Manchester City | Transfer | €23M | |
| 12 August 2020 | (France) Francis Coquelin | Villarreal | Transfer | €6.5M | |
| 12 August 2020 | (Spain) Dani Parejo | Villarreal | Transfer | Free | |
| 13 August 2020 | (Spain) Javi Jiménez | Albacete | Loan | | |
| 29 August 2020 | (Spain) Rodrigo | (England) Leeds United | Transfer | €30M | |
| 9 September 2020 | (Italy) Cristiano Piccini | (Italy) Atalanta | Loan | | |
| 30 September 2020 | (Spain) Álex Carbonell | (Switzerland) Luzern | Transfer | Free | |
| 2 October 2020 | (Spain) Álex Centelles | Almería | Transfer | Free | |
| 3 November 2020 | (Central African Republic) Geoffrey Kondogbia | Atlético Madrid | Transfer | €15M | |

== Valladolid ==
Manager: (Spain) Sergio González (4th season)

=== In ===
| Date | Player | From | Type | Fee | Ref |
|---|---|---|---|---|---|
| 20 July 2020 | (Morocco) Anuar Tuhami | (Greece) Panathinaikos | Loan return | | |
| 21 July 2020 | (Spain) Álvaro Aguado | Numancia | Loan return | | |
| 21 July 2020 | (Brazil) Marcos André | Mirandés | Loan return | | |
| 21 July 2020 | (Spain) Luismi | Oviedo | Loan return | | |
| 21 July 2020 | (Spain) Moi | Racing Santander | Loan return | | |
| 24 July 2020 | (Spain) Chris Ramos | Badajoz | Loan return | | |
| 4 August 2020 | (Chile) Fabián Orellana | Eibar | Transfer | Free | |
| 4 August 2020 | (Spain) Luis Pérez | Tenerife | Transfer | Free | |
| 8 August 2020 | (Spain) Javi Sánchez | Real Madrid | Buyout clause | €3M | |
| 11 August 2020 | (Spain) Bruno González | Levante | Transfer | Free | |
| 28 August 2020 | (Spain) Roberto | (England) West Ham United | Transfer | Free | |
| 31 August 2020 | (Israel) Shon Weissman | (Austria) Wolfsberger AC | Transfer | €4M | |
| 24 September 2020 | (Morocco) Jawad El Yamiq | (Italy) Genoa | Transfer | Undisclosed | |
| 1 October 2020 | (Switzerland) Saidy Janko | (Portugal) Porto | Transfer | Undisclosed | |
| 5 October 2020 | (Portugal) Jota | (Portugal) Benfica | Loan | | |
| 5 October 2020 | (Spain) Roque Mesa | Sevilla | Transfer | Free | |

=== Out ===
| Date | Player | To | Type | Fee | Ref |
|---|---|---|---|---|---|
| 20 July 2020 | (Brazil) Matheus Fernandes | (Brazil) Palmeiras | Loan return | | |
| 20 July 2020 | (Spain) Raúl García | Getafe | Loan return | | |
| 20 July 2020 | (Spain) Pedro Porro | (England) Manchester City | Loan return | | |
| 20 July 2020 | (Spain) Sandro Ramírez | (England) Everton | Loan return | | |
| 20 July 2020 | (Turkey) Enes Ünal | Villarreal | Loan return | | |
| 6 August 2020 | (Spain) Víctor García | Sabadell | Loan | | |
| 8 August 2020 | (Ecuador) Stiven Plaza | (Turkey) Trabzonspor | Loan | €100K | |
| 12 August 2020 | (Ghana) Mohammed Salisu | (England) Southampton | Transfer | €12M | |
| 20 August 2020 | (Spain) Diego Alende | Lugo | Loan | | |
| 22 August 2020 | (Spain) José Antonio Caro | Ponferradina | Loan | | |
| 1 September 2020 | (Spain) Moi | Fuenlabrada | Loan | | |
| 7 September 2020 | (Morocco) Anuar Tuhami | (Cyprus) APOEL | Loan | | |
| 25 September 2020 | (Spain) Luismi | Elche | Transfer | Free | |
| 26 September 2020 | (Spain) Antoñito | (Greece) Panathinaikos | Transfer | Free | |
| 1 October 2020 | (Spain) Álvaro Aguado | Fuenlabrada | Loan | | |
| 3 October 2020 | (Spain) Chris Ramos | Lugo | Loan | | |
| 5 October 2020 | (Spain) Javi Moyano | Unattached | Released | | |
| 7 October 2020 | (France) Hatem Ben Arfa | (France) Bordeaux | Transfer | Free | |

== Villarreal ==
Manager: (Spain) Unai Emery (1st season)

=== In ===
| Date | Player | From | Type | Fee | Ref |
|---|---|---|---|---|---|
| 20 July 2020 | (Spain) Jaume Costa | Valencia | Loan return | | |
| 20 July 2020 | (Spain) Alfonso Pedraza | Real Betis | Loan return | | |
| 20 July 2020 | (Turkey) Enes Ünal | Valladolid | Loan return | | |
| 21 July 2020 | (Spain) Enric Franquesa | Mirandés | Loan return | | |
| 21 July 2020 | (Spain) Miguelón | Huesca | Loan return | | |
| 21 July 2020 | (Spain) Dani Raba | Huesca | Loan return | | |
| 10 August 2020 | (Japan) Takefusa Kubo | Real Madrid | Loan | €2.5M | |
| 12 August 2020 | (France) Francis Coquelin | Valencia | Transfer | €6.5M | |
| 12 August 2020 | (Spain) Dani Parejo | Valencia | Transfer | Free | |
| 4 September 2020 | (Argentina) Gerónimo Rulli | Real Sociedad | Transfer | €5M | |
| 15 September 2020 | (Spain) Mario González | (France) Clermont | Transfer | Free | |
| 16 September 2020 | (Ecuador) Pervis Estupiñán | (England) Watford | Transfer | €15M | |
| 22 September 2020 | (Spain) Jorge Cuenca | Barcelona B | Transfer | €2.5M | |
| 4 October 2020 | (Argentina) Juan Foyth | (England) Tottenham Hotspur | Loan | | |

=== Out ===
| Date | Player | To | Type | Fee | Ref |
|---|---|---|---|---|---|
| 20 July 2020 | (Argentina) Mariano Barbosa | Unattached | End of contract | | |
| 20 July 2020 | (Spain) Bruno Soriano | Retired | | | |
| 20 July 2020 | (Cameroon) André-Frank Zambo Anguissa | (England) Fulham | Loan return | | |
| 4 August 2020 | (Qatar) Akram Afif | (Qatar) Al Sadd | Buyout clause | €1M | |
| 4 August 2020 | (Spain) Álvaro | (France) Marseille | Buyout clause | €5M | |
| 4 August 2020 | (Spain) Santi Cazorla | (Qatar) Al Sadd | Transfer | Free | |
| 4 August 2020 | (Cameroon) Karl Toko Ekambi | (France) Lyon | Buyout clause | €11.5M | |
| 4 August 2020 | (Romania) Andrei Rațiu | (Netherlands) ADO Den Haag | Loan | | |
| 12 August 2020 | (Turkey) Enes Ünal | Getafe | Transfer | €9M | |
| 13 August 2020 | (Spain) Sergio Lozano | Cartagena | Loan | | |
| 14 August 2020 | (Spain) Iván Martín | Mirandés | Loan | | |
| 18 August 2020 | (Spain) Xavi Quintillà | (England) Norwich City | Loan | | |
| 25 August 2020 | (Spain) Miguelón | Espanyol | Loan | | |
| 27 August 2020 | (Spain) Enric Franquesa | Girona | Loan | | |
| 28 August 2020 | (Spain) Andrés Fernández | Huesca | Transfer | Undisclosed | |
| 7 September 2020 | (Spain) Manu Morlanes | Almería | Loan | | |
| 15 September 2020 | (Spain) Mario González | (Portugal) Tondela | Loan | | |
| 19 September 2020 | (Spain) Miguel Ángel Leal | (Netherlands) Groningen | Loan | | |
| 22 September 2020 | (Spain) Jorge Cuenca | Almería | Loan | | |
| 24 September 2020 | (Spain) Javier Ontiveros | Huesca | Loan | €650K | |
