= 2018–19 Málaga CF season =

Málaga CF
2018–19 season
- Owner: Sheikh Abdullah Al Thani
- Manager: Juan Muñiz (until 14 April); Víctor Sánchez (from 15 April)
- Stadium: La Rosaleda
- Segunda División: 3rd
- Copa del Rey: Second round
- Top goalscorer: League: Adrián (10); All: Adrián (10)
- Highest home attendance: 27,275 (vs Deportivo La Coruña, 15 June 2019)
- Lowest home attendance: 1,607 (vs Alcorcón, 24 August 2018)
- Average home league attendance: 17,864
Home colours	Away colours	Third colours

During the 2018–19 season, Málaga CF participated in the Segunda División and the Copa del Rey.

== Current squad ==
As of 19 May 2019

Note: Flags indicate national team as defined under FIFA eligibility rules; some limited exceptions apply. Players may hold more than one non-FIFA nationality.

No.	Pos.	Nation	Player
1	GK	MAR	Munir
2	DF	SRB	Rajko Brežančić
3	DF	ESP	Diego González
4	DF	ESP	Luis Hernández
5	DF	ESP	Pau Torres (on loan from Villarreal)
6	MF	ALG	Mehdi Lacen
7	DF	ESP	Juankar
8	MF	ESP	Adrián
9	FW	ARG	Gustavo Leschuk (on loan from Shakhtar Donetsk)
10	MF	ESP	Iván Alejo (on loan from Getafe)
11	MF	POR	Renato Santos
12	DF	ESP	Cifu
14	MF	MAR	Badr Boulahroud
15	DF	URU	Federico Ricca (captain)
16	FW	UKR	Yevhen Seleznyov (on loan from Akhisar Belediyespor)
17	MF	ESP	Javi Ontiveros

No.	Pos.	Nation	Player
18	DF	ESP	David Lombán
20	MF	ESP	Erik Morán (on loan from AEK Athens)
21	MF	SEN	Alfred N'Diaye (on loan from Villarreal)
22	MF	ESP	Dani Pacheco
23	DF	ESP	Miguel Torres
24	FW	CIV	Mamadou Koné (on loan from Leganés)
25	GK	POL	Paweł Kieszek
28	MF	ESP	Álex Mula
29	DF	ESP	Iván Rodríguez
30	FW	SCO	Jack Harper
31	MF	MAR	Hicham
32	DF	MAR	Abdel Abqar
34	MF	ESP	Iván Jaime
35	MF	ALB	Keidi Bare
36	FW	ESP	Hugo Vallejo
—	GK	TUR	Cenk Gönen

=== Out on loan ===
Note: Flags indicate national team as defined under FIFA eligibility rules; some limited exceptions apply. Players may hold more than one non-FIFA nationality.

No.	Pos.	Nation	Player
—	DF	ESP	Luis Muñoz (at Córdoba until 30 June 2019)
—	DF	VEN	Roberto Rosales (at Espanyol until 30 June 2019)
—	DF	VEN	Mikel Villanueva (at Gimnàstic until 30 June 2019)
—	MF	ARG	Emanuel Cecchini (at Banfield until 30 June 2019)
—	MF	ESP	Jony (at Alavés until 30 June 2019)

No.	Pos.	Nation	Player
—	MF	VEN	Juanpi (at Huesca until 30 June 2019)
—	MF	ESP	Keko (at Valladolid until 30 June 2019)
—	MF	ARG	Esteban Rolón (at Genoa until 30 June 2019)
—	MF	MAR	Adnane Tighadouini (at Esbjerg until 30 June 2019)
—	FW	URU	Michael Santos (at Leganés until 30 June 2019)

== Competitions ==
=== Overall ===
Competition	Final position
Segunda División	3rd
Copa del Rey	Second Round

=== Segunda División ===
==== League table ====
Pos	Team	Pld	W	D	L	GF	GA	GD	Pts	Promotion, qualification or relegation
1	Osasuna (C, P)	42	26	9	7	59	35	+24	87	Promotion to La Liga
2	Granada (P)	42	22	13	7	52	28	+24	79	Promotion to La Liga
3	Málaga	42	21	11	10	51	31	+20	74	Qualification to promotion play-offs
4	Albacete	42	19	14	9	54	38	+16	71	Qualification to promotion play-offs
5	Mallorca (O, P)	42	19	12	11	53	37	+16	69	Qualification to promotion play-offs

Source: La Liga
Rules for classification: 1) points; 2) head-to-head points; 3) head-to-head goal difference; 4) goal difference; 5) number of goals scored
(C) Champions; (O) Play-off winners; (P) Promoted

==== Matches ====
Win Draw Loss Fixtures

18 August 2018 1	Lugo	1–2	Málaga	Lugo
19:30 CEST (UTC+02:00)	Herrera 6'; Pita (yellow card) 41'	Report	N'Diaye (yellow card) 68', (goal) 89'; Juankar 86'; Hicham (yellow card) 90+1'	Stadium: Anxo Carro; Attendance: 3,233; Referee: Víctor Areces Franco

24 August 2018 2	Málaga	1–0	Alcorcón	Málaga
22:00 CEST (UTC+02:00)	Hicham (yellow card) 69'; Leschuk 82'; Ontiveros (red card) 90+2'	Report	Dorca (yellow card) 41'; Bellvís (yellow card) 44' (yellow-red card) 90+2'	Stadium: La Rosaleda; Attendance: 9,748; Referee: Juan Luis Pulido Santana

3 September 2018 3	Almería	0–1	Málaga	Almería
21:00 CEST (UTC+02:00)	Ibiza (yellow card) 90'	Report	Harper 24'; Boulahroud (yellow card) 88'; N'Diaye (yellow card) 90+3'	Stadium: Juegos Mediterráneos; Attendance: 9,118; Referee: Valentín Pizarro Gómez

8 September 2018 4	Málaga	1–0	Tenerife	Málaga
22:00 CEST (UTC+02:00)	Leschuk 35'; Ontiveros (yellow card) 39'; Lacen (yellow card) 72'; Juankar (yellow card) 77'; Adrián (yellow card) 90+5'	Report	Suso (yellow card) 53'; Pérez (yellow card) 75'; Acosta (yellow card) 86'	Stadium: La Rosaleda; Attendance: 15,616; Referee: Vicandi Garrido

15 September 2018 5	Málaga	3–0	Córdoba	Málaga
18:00 CEST (UTC+02:00)	Adrián 15', (yellow card) 30'; Cifu (yellow card) 20'; Hicham 39'; Ontiveros (yellow card) 47'; Torres (yellow card) 62'; Ricca 72'	Report	Touré (yellow card) 26'; Quintanilla (yellow card) 53'	Stadium: La Rosaleda; Attendance: 19,175; Referee: Santiago Varón Aceitón

23 September 2018 6	Las Palmas	1–0	Málaga	Las Palmas
18:00 CEST (UTC+02:00)	Cala (yellow card) 70'; Mir 74'; Lemos (yellow card) 90+3'	Report	Ricca (yellow card) 15'; Koné (yellow card) 90'	Stadium: Gran Canaria; Attendance: 21,319; Referee: Ocón Arráiz

30 September 2018 7	Málaga	1–0	Rayo Majadahonda	Málaga
16:00 CEST (UTC+02:00)	Harper 10'; Rodríguez (yellow card) 22'; Ricca (yellow card) 68'; Pacheco (yellow card) 85'	Report	Luso (yellow card) 62'; Galán (yellow card) 73'; Rafa (yellow card) 76'	Stadium: La Rosaleda; Attendance: 18,365; Referee: Javier Iglesias Villanueva

7 October 2018 8	Deportivo La Coruña	1–1	Málaga	A Coruña
18:00 CEST (UTC+02:00)	Fernández 76'; Quique (red card) 78'	Report	Juanpi (yellow card) 29'; Harper (yellow card) 40'; N'Diaye 54'; Ontiveros (yellow card) 69'; Rodríguez (yellow card) 73'; Adrián (yellow card) 80'	Stadium: Riazor; Attendance: 18,374; Referee: Díaz de Mera

16 October 2018 9	Málaga	2–1	Albacete	Málaga
16:00 CEST (UTC+02:00)	Ontiveros (yellow card) 54'; Leschuk 64', 67'; Ricca (yellow card) 74'; Morales (yellow card) 77'; Harper (yellow card) 89'	Report	Caro (yellow card) 16'; Bela 58' (pen.)	Stadium: La Rosaleda; Attendance: 19,031; Referee: Gorostegui Fernández-Ortega

19 October 2018 10	Elche	2–0	Málaga	Elche
21:00 CEST (UTC+02:00)	Neyder 36'; Villar (yellow card) 38'; Martínez 63'; Manuel (yellow card) 68'; Benja (yellow card) 88'	Report	Ricca (yellow card) 62'	Stadium: Martínez Valero; Attendance: 9,084; Referee: Pulido Santana

29 October 2018 11	Málaga	2–0	Numancia	Málaga
21:00 CEST (UTC+02:00)	Leschuk 1', 47', (yellow card) 45'	Report	Juan Carlos (yellow card) 37'; Viguera (yellow card) 78'; Etxeberria (yellow card) 87'	Stadium: La Rosaleda; Attendance: 14,780; Referee: Pizarro Gómez

3 November 2018 12	Osasuna	2–1	Málaga	Pamplona
18:00 CEST (UTC+02:00)	Villar (yellow card) 52', (goal) 80'; Xisco (red card) 80'; Torres 83'	Report	Neyder 21'; Leschuk (yellow card) 30' (yellow-red card) 74'; Rodríguez (yellow card) 65'; Ricca (yellow card) 67'; Munir (yellow card) 75'; Ontiveros (yellow card) 79'; N'Diaye (red card) 80'; Lombán (yellow card) 82'; Adrián (yellow card) 87'	Stadium: El Sadar; Attendance: 14,143; Referee: de la Fuente Ramos

11 November 2018 13	Sporting Gijón	2–2	Málaga	Gijón
18:00 CEST (UTC+02:00)	P. Pérez (yellow card) 17'; Salvador (yellow card) 54'; A. Pérez (yellow card) 64'; Babin (yellow card) 67'; Carmona 76' (pen.), 90+4'	Report	Lombán (yellow card) 26'; Diego Gonzalez (yellow card) 56'; Juanpi 66'; Koné 80'; Boulahroud (yellow card) 90'	Stadium: El Molinón; Attendance: 18,559; Referee: Sagués Oscoz

17 November 2018 14	Málaga	2–0	Gimnàstic	Málaga
16:00 CEST (UTC+02:00)	Leschuk (yellow card) 13'; Koné 25'; N'Diaye (yellow card) 34'; Ontiveros (yellow card) 89'; Adrián 90+2'	Report	Tete (yellow card) 53' (yellow-red card) 75'; Dumitru (yellow card) 73'	Stadium: La Rosaleda; Attendance: 17,256; Referee: Moreno Aragón

25 November 2018 15	Extremadura	1–0	Málaga	Almendralejo
16:00 CEST (UTC+02:00)	Kike 32', (yellow card) 53'; López (yellow card) 90+2'	Report	Torres (yellow card) 28'; Rodríguez (yellow card) 68'; N'Diaye (yellow card) 73'; González (yellow card) 78'	Stadium: Francisco de la Hera; Attendance: 7,707; Referee: Javier Iglesias Villanueva

1 December 2018 16	Málaga	0–1	Granada	Málaga
18:00 CEST (UTC+02:00)	González (yellow card) 78'; Hakšabanović (yellow card) 90+1'	Report	Montoro 54', (yellow card) 69'; Silva (yellow card) 84'	Stadium: La Rosaleda; Attendance: 22,988; Referee: Soto Grado

8 December 2018 17	Mallorca	1–2	Málaga	Palma
18:00 CEST (UTC+02:00)	López 73'; Raíllo (yellow card) 89'	Report	Adrián (yellow card) 9'; Pacheco (yellow card) 22'; Harper 42'; Leschuk (yellow card) 78'; Cifu 85'; Ricca (yellow card) 90+1'; Lombán (yellow card) 90+3'; Munir (yellow card) 90+5'	Stadium: Son Moix; Attendance: 9,463; Referee: Gorostegui Fernández-Ortega

14 December 2018 18	Málaga	1–0	Cádiz	Málaga
21:00 CEST (UTC+02:00)	Torres (yellow card) 27'; Juanpi (yellow card) 44'; N'Diaye (yellow card) 62'; Ricca 70'	Report	Mari (yellow card) 41'; Sánchez (yellow card) 45+2'; Oliván (yellow card) 54'	Stadium: La Rosaleda; Attendance: 17,650; Referee: Trujillo Suárez

22 December 2018 19	Oviedo	0–0	Málaga	Oviedo
16:00 CEST (UTC+02:00)	Boateng (yellow card) 82'; Steven (yellow card) 88'	Report	Harper (yellow card) 90+4'	Stadium: Carlos Tartiere; Attendance: 12,825; Referee: Arcediano Monescillo

6 January 2019 20	Málaga	0–3	Reus	Málaga
20:00 CEST (UTC+02:00)	N'Diaye (yellow card) 30'; Harper (yellow card) 56'; Santos (yellow card) 57'; González (yellow card) 62'	Report	Herrera 11'; Linares (yellow card) 37'; Ledes 63' (pen.); Querol 83'	Stadium: La Rosaleda; Attendance: 16,058; Referee: López Toca

13 January 2019 21	Real Zaragoza	0–2	Málaga	Zaragoza
18:00 CEST (UTC+02:00)	Guitián (yellow card) 28'; Benito (yellow card) 69'	Report	Ricca 30'; Lacen (yellow card) 35'; Bare (yellow card) 59'; Torres (yellow card) 81'; Adrián 82'	Stadium: La Romareda; Attendance: 24,981; Referee: Pizarro Gómez

19 January 2019 22	Málaga	2–1	Lugo	Málaga
20:30 CEST (UTC+02:00)	Bare (yellow card) 34'; Lombán (yellow card) 37'; Adrián 50'; Harper 79'	Report	Josete 8', (red card) 70'; Azeez (yellow card) 63'	Stadium: La Rosaleda; Attendance: 12,758; Referee: Moreno Aragón

26 January 2019 23	Tenerife	0–0	Málaga	Santa Cruz de Tenerife
20:30 CEST (UTC+02:00)	Jorge (yellow card) 7'	Report	N'Diaye (yellow card) 47'; Harper (yellow card) 80'	Stadium: Heliodoro Rodríguez López; Attendance: 4,466; Referee: Ais Reig

1 February 2019 24	Málaga	1–1	Almería	Málaga
21:00 CEST (UTC+02:00)	Adrián 12'; Morán (yellow card) 25'; N'Diaye (yellow card) 72'	Report	Owona (yellow card) 59'; Juan Carlos (yellow card) 70'; Demirović (yellow card) 86'; Rioja 90+1'	Stadium: La Rosaleda; Attendance: 13,313; Referee: Víctor Areces Franco

10 February 2019 25	Málaga	0–0	Las Palmas	Málaga
20:00 CEST (UTC+02:00)	Alejo (yellow card) 17'; Bare (yellow card) 42' (yellow-red card) 59'; Rodríguez (yellow card) 43'; Leschuk (yellow card) 79'	Report	Deivid (red card) 72'; Cala (yellow card) 90+4'	Stadium: La Rosaleda; Attendance: 16,040; Referee: Ocón Arráiz

17 February 2019 26	Rayo Majadahonda	0–1	Málaga	Majadahonda
18:00 CEST (UTC+02:00)	Verdés (yellow card) 35'	Report	Morán (yellow card) 13'; Adrián 78'; Hernández (yellow card) 90+2'	Stadium: Cerro del Espino; Attendance: 3,137; Referee: Javier Iglesias Villanueva

24 February 2019 27	Málaga	0–0	Deportivo La Coruña	Málaga
18:00 CEST (UTC+02:00)	Pacheco (yellow card) 19'; Ricca (yellow card) 45'; González (yellow card) 61'; Bare (yellow card) 62'; N'Diaye (yellow card) 78'	Report	Bergantiños (yellow card) 16'; Mosquera (yellow card) 33'	Stadium: La Rosaleda; Attendance: 22,414; Referee: Gorostegui Fernández-Ortega

2 March 2019 28	Córdoba	1–1	Málaga	Córdoba
18:00 CEST (UTC+02:00)	Muñoz (yellow card) 34'; De las Cuevas 61', (yellow card) 67'; Touré (yellow card) 66'; Manzambi (yellow card) 87'; Fernández (yellow card) 90+4'	Report	Morán (yellow card) 23'; Leschuk (yellow card) 51'; Ricca (yellow card) 90'; N'Diaye 90+3'	Stadium: El Arcángel; Attendance: 13,926; Referee: Vicandi Garrido

11 March 2019 29	Málaga	1–2	Osasuna	Málaga
21:00 CEST (UTC+02:00)	Adrián 15', (yellow card) 32'; Ontiveros (yellow card) 30'; Ricca (yellow card) 45+2'; Harper (yellow card) 89'	Report	Vidal (yellow card) 27'; Oier (yellow card) 34'; Herrera (yellow card) 40'; Mérida (yellow card) 45+2'; García 47'; Villar 75'	Stadium: La Rosaleda; Attendance: 22,692; Referee: Díaz de Mera

18 March 2019 30	Numancia	1–1	Málaga	Soria
21:00 CEST (UTC+02:00)	Diamanka 40'; Nacho (yellow card) 45'; Escassi (yellow card) 58'; Higinio (yellow card) 79'	Report	Ricca 49'; Rodríguez (yellow card) 60'; Alejo (yellow card) 76'; N'Diaye (yellow card) 80'; Torres (yellow card) 80'	Stadium: Los Pajaritos; Attendance: 2,537; Referee: Sagués Oscoz

24 March 2019 31	Nàstic	0–1	Málaga	Tarragona
16:00 CEST (UTC+02:00)	Pipa (yellow card) 32'	Report	Alejo (yellow card) 63'; Adrián (yellow card) 72'; Pacheco 72'	Stadium: Nou Estadi; Attendance: 6,212; Referee: Pulido Santana

29 March 2019 32	Málaga	1–1	Sporting Gijón	Málaga
21:00 CEST (UTC+02:00)	Morán (yellow card) 18'; Adrián (yellow card) 19'; Alejo (yellow card) 27' (yellow-red card) 71'; González (yellow card) 55'; Leschuk 82'; N'Diaye (yellow card) 88'	Report	Đurđević 20' (pen.); Molinero (yellow card) 23'; Babin (yellow card) 57'; Geraldes (yellow card) 63'; Pérez (red card) 66'; Lod (yellow card) 80'; Traver (yellow card) 84'; Alegría (yellow card) 89'	Stadium: La Rosaleda; Attendance: 17,055; Referee: Pizarro Gómez

6 April 2019 33	Granada	1–0	Málaga	Granada
18:00 CEST (UTC+02:00)	Puertas 5'; San Emeterio (yellow card) 27'; Montoro (yellow card) 33'; Quini (yellow card) 39'	Report	N'Diaye (yellow card) 20' (yellow-red card) 47'; Hernández (yellow card) 27'; Alejo (yellow card) 38'; Ricca (yellow card) 74'	Stadium: Nuevo Los Cármenes; Attendance: 15,211; Referee: Trujillo Suárez

13 April 2019 34	Málaga	1–2	Extremadura	Málaga
16:00 CEST (UTC+02:00)	Torres (yellow card) 42'; Leschuk 56'; Mula (yellow card) 71'	Report	Zarfino (yellow card) 22'; Lolo 32'; Pardo 75'	Stadium: La Rosaleda; Attendance: 18,910; Referee: Rubén Ávalos

19 April 2019 35	Alcorcón	1–4	Málaga	Alcorcón
21:00 CEST (UTC+02:00)	Sangalli (yellow card) 35'; Muñoz 45' (pen.); Boateng (yellow card) 59'; Elgezabal (yellow card) 80'	Report	Ontiveros 12', 71'; Adrián 28'; N'Diaye (yellow card) 43'; Santos 53'	Stadium: Santo Domingo; Attendance: 1,607; Referee: Ais Reig

27 April 2019 36	Málaga	0–1	Mallorca	Málaga
16:15 CEST (UTC+02:00)		Report	Sevilla (yellow card) 27'; Ruiz (yellow card) 64'; Budimir (yellow card) 67'; Suárez 86'; Junior (yellow card) 90+2'	Stadium: La Rosaleda; Attendance: 23,621; Referee: David Pérez

5 May 2019 37	Cádiz	1–1	Málaga	Cádiz
21:00 CEST (UTC+02:00)	Aketxe 23'; Garrido (yellow card) 35'; Barco (yellow card) 60'; Machís (yellow card) 72'	Report	N'Diaye 7', (yellow card) 51'; Leschuk (yellow card) 18'; Bare (yellow card) 22'; Lombán (yellow card) 37'; Hicham (yellow card) 81'	Stadium: Ramón de Carranza; Attendance: 14,320; Referee: Gorostegui Fernández-Ortega

13 May 2019 38	Málaga	3–0	Oviedo	Málaga
21:00 CEST (UTC+02:00)	Adrián 16' (pen.); Bare (red card) 30'; Ontiveros 45+1'; Cifu 80'	Report	Jimmy (yellow card) 43'; Hernández (yellow card) 53'; Joselu (yellow card) 63'	Stadium: La Rosaleda; Attendance: 15,894; Referee: Pulido Santana

19 May 2019 39	Reus	0–1	Málaga	Reus
		Report		Stadium: Municipal
Note: Reus was expelled after the end of the first half of the season due to unpaid wages. Their matches of the second half were given to their opponents by 0–1.

24 May 2019 40	Málaga	3–1	Real Zaragoza	Málaga
21:00 CEST (UTC+02:00)	Ontiveros (yellow card) 49'; Santos 53'; Leschuk 60'; Adrián 74'	Report	Papunashvili (yellow card) 2'; Biel 9'; Vázquez (yellow card) 54'; Guti (yellow card) 77'; Nieto (yellow card) 83'	Stadium: La Rosaleda; Attendance: 19,284; Referee: Trujillo Suárez

5 June 2019 41	Albacete	1–2	Málaga	Albacete
19:00 CEST (UTC+02:00)	Acuña (yellow card) 40'; Zozulya 57', (yellow card) 68'; Gentiletti (yellow card) 65'; Gorosito (yellow card) 81'; Barri (yellow card) 83'	Report	Ontiveros 16', (yellow card) 45+1'; Leschuk (yellow card) 39' (yellow-red card) 54'; N'Diaye 52', (yellow card) 72'; Munir (yellow card) 78'	Stadium: Carlos Belmonte; Attendance: 11,649

8 June 2019 42	Málaga	3–0	Elche	Málaga
20:30 CEST (UTC+02:00)	Boulahroud 5'; Ricca (yellow card) 55', (goal) 66'; Hicham 71'	Report	Nino (yellow card) 37'; Flores (yellow card) 40'; Manuel (yellow card) 60'; Tekio (yellow card) 63'; Qasmi (yellow card) 90+2'; Sánchez (yellow card) 90+2'	Stadium: La Rosaleda; Attendance: 17,906; Referee: Rubén Ávalos

=== Promotion play-offs ===
==== Semifinals ====
13 June 2019 First leg	Deportivo La Coruña	4–2	Málaga	A Coruña
21:00 CEST (UTC+02:00)	Pedro (yellow card) 13', (goal) 56'; Fernández 21' (pen.), 63'; Valle 78'	Report	Hernández 18'; Rodríguez (yellow card) 25'; Bare (yellow card) 30'; Ontiveros 37', (yellow card) 90+1'	Stadium: Riazor; Attendance: 24,267; Referee: Soto Grado

15 June 2019 Second leg	Málaga	0–1 (2–5 agg.)	Deportivo La Coruña	Málaga
21:00 CEST (UTC+02:00)	Hernández (yellow card) 10'; Bare (yellow card) 41'; Adrián (yellow card) 75'; Ontiveros (yellow card) 89'	Report	Bóveda (yellow card) 35'; Fernández (yellow card) 38'; Giménez (yellow card) 68'; Bergantiños 82'	Stadium: La Rosaleda; Attendance: 27,275; Referee: Díaz De Mera

=== Copa del Rey ===
==== Second round ====
9 November 2018	Málaga	1–2	Almería	Málaga
18:45	Hernández 45+1' (pen.); Lacen (yellow card) 54'; Juankar (yellow card) 58'; Boulahroud (yellow card) 61'	Report	Corpas (yellow card) 45+1'; Martos (yellow card) 53'; Gassama 65', (yellow card) 90+3'; Montoro 78', (yellow card) 89'; Rioja (yellow card) 85'; Aguza (yellow card) 90+6'	Stadium: La Rosaleda; Attendance: 13,036; Referee: Gorostegui Fernández-Ortega

== Statistics ==
=== Appearances and goals ===
Last updated on 15 June 2019.

No.	Pos	Nat	Player	Total		Segunda División		Copa del Rey		Promotion Play-offs	
No.	Pos	Nat	Player	Apps	Goals	Apps	Goals	Apps	Goals	Apps	Goals
Goalkeepers
1	GK	(Morocco) MAR	Munir	38	0	36	0	0	0	2	0
25	GK	(Poland) POL	Paweł Kieszek	6	0	5	0	1	0	0	0
–	GK	(Turkey) TUR	Cenk Gönen	0	0	0	0	0	0	0	0
Defenders
2	DF	(Serbia) SRB	Rajko Brežančić	0	0	0	0	0	0	0	0
3	DF	(Spain) ESP	Diego González	24	0	19+3	0	1	0	0+1	0
4	DF	(Spain) ESP	Luis Hernández	26	1	23+1	0	0	0	2	1
5	DF	(Spain) ESP	Pau Torres	40	1	38	1	0	0	2	0
12	DF	(Spain) ESP	Cifu	25	2	23+1	2	0	0	1	0
15	DF	(Uruguay) URU	Federico Ricca	37	5	35+1	5	0	0	1	0
18	DF	(Spain) ESP	David Lombán	11	0	7+4	0	0	0	0	0
23	DF	(Spain) ESP	Miguel Torres	1	0	0+1	0	0	0	0	0
29	DF	(Spain) ESP	Iván Rodríguez	22	0	18+2	0	1	0	1	0
32	DF	(Morocco) MAR	Abdel Abqar	1	0	0	0	1	0	0	0
Midfielders
6	MF	(Algeria) ALG	Mehdi Lacen	21	0	12+8	0	1	0	0	0
7	MF	(Spain) ESP	Juankar	8	1	3+3	1	1	0	1	0
8	MF	(Spain) ESP	Adrián	40	10	37+1	10	0	0	2	0
10	MF	(Spain) ESP	Iván Alejo	12	0	7+5	0	0	0	0	0
11	MF	(Portugal) POR	Renato Santos	27	2	16+9	2	0	0	1+1	0
14	MF	(Morocco) MAR	Badr Boulahroud	9	1	2+5	1	1	0	1	0
17	MF	(Spain) ESP	Javi Ontiveros	34	5	21+10	4	0+1	0	2	1
20	MF	(Spain) ESP	Erik Morán	8	0	6+1	0	0	0	0+1	0
21	MF	(Senegal) SEN	Alfred N'Diaye	34	5	34	5	0	0	0	0
22	MF	(Spain) ESP	Dani Pacheco	24	1	14+8	1	0	0	0+2	0
28	MF	(Spain) ESP	Álex Mula	11	0	4+7	0	0	0	0	0
31	MF	(Morocco) MAR	Hicham	17	2	2+13	2	1	0	1	0
34	MF	(Spain) ESP	Iván Jaime	1	0	0	0	0+1	0	0	0
35	MF	(Albania) ALB	Keidi Bare	18	0	15+1	0	0	0	2	0
36	MF	(Spain) ESP	Hugo Vallejo	4	0	3+1	0	0	0	0	0
Forwards
9	FW	(Argentina) ARG	Gustavo Leschuk	42	9	36+3	9	0+1	0	2	0
16	FW	(Ukraine) UKR	Yevhen Seleznyov	12	0	2+10	0	0	0	0	0
24	FW	(Ivory Coast) CIV	Mamadou Koné	10	2	5+3	2	1	0	0+1	0
30	FW	(Scotland) SCO	Jack Harper	26	4	20+5	4	0	0	1	0
Players who have made an appearance or had a squad number this season but have left the club
–	MF	(Spain) ESP	Recio	0	0	0	0	0	0	0	0
–	FW	(Venezuela) VEN	Roberto Rosales	0	0	0	0	0	0	0	0
13	GK	(Spain) ESP	Andrés Prieto	0	0	0	0	0	0	0	0
13	GK	(Argentina) ARG	Axel Werner	0	0	0	0	0	0	0	0
10	MF	(Venezuela) VEN	Juanpi	16	1	13+2	1	1	0	0	0
20	MF	(Montenegro) MNE	Sead Hakšabanović	2	0	0+2	0	0	0	0	0
19	FW	(Spain) ESP	Héctor Hernández	1	1	0	0	1	1	0	0
