= Mohamed Bouldini =

Moroccan footballer (born 1995)

Mohamed Bouldini محمد بولديني
Personal information
- Date of birth: 27 November 1995 (age 30)
- Place of birth: Casablanca, Morocco
- Height: 1.87 m (6 ft 2 in)
- Position: Forward

Team information
- Current team: Académico de Viseu
- Number: 9

Youth career
- –2015: Rachad Bernoussi

Senior career*
Years	Team	Apps	(Gls)
2015–2017	Raja CA	17	(1)
2017–2018	Ittihad Tanger	6	(0)
2018–2020	Oliveirense	32	(5)
2020–2021	Académica	29	(14)
2021–2022	Santa Clara	9	(0)
2022	→ Fuenlabrada (loan)	17	(7)
2022–2024	Levante	72	(16)
2024–2026	Deportivo A Coruña	20	(1)
2025–2026	→ Granada (loan)	14	(0)
2026–	Académico de Viseu	1	(0)
- * Club domestic league appearances and goals as of 6 September 2026

Mohamed Bouldini (Arabic: محمد بولديني; born 27 November 1995) is a Moroccan footballer who plays as a forward for Primeira Liga club Académico de Viseu.

== Club career ==
Born in Casablanca, Bouldini signed for Botola club Raja CA in 2015. Unwanted, he moved in January 2018 to Ittihad Tanger in the same league, for a fee of 1 million Moroccan dirhams. After six goalless games, his contract was rescinded. Following a trial, he signed a one-year deal with Portuguese LigaPro side Oliveirense in July 2018.

On 27 August 2020, Bouldrini signed for Académica de Coimbra of the same league. With 13 goals over the season, he ranked second to Vizela's Cassiano. On 23 November, he scored the only goal of a home win over Varzim in the third round of the Taça de Portugal.

Bouldini signed a three-year contract with Primeira Liga club Santa Clara on 18 June 2021. The following 8 January, after featuring sparingly, he was loaned to Spanish Segunda División side Fuenlabrada for the remainder of the season.

On 29 June 2022, despite Fuenla's relegation, the club exercised his buyout clause. On 23 August, however, he moved to second division side Levante on a five-year contract.

On 29 August 2024, Bouldini signed a four-year deal with Deportivo A Coruña also in the Spanish second division. Exactly one year later, he moved to fellow league team Granada on a one-year loan deal, with Stoichkov moving in the opposite direction.

Upon returning, Bouldini terminated his link with Dépor on 31 July 2026.

== International career ==
In August 2015, while at Raja, Bouldini was a surprise call-up for the Morocco national team under manager Ezzaki Badou, for a 2017 Africa Cup of Nations qualifier against São Tomé and Príncipe. He did not play in the 3–0 away win on 5 September.

== Career statistics ==
As of match played on 6 October 2023

Club	Season	League			National cup (Note: Includes Moroccan Throne Cup, Taça de Portugal, Copa del Rey)		League cup (Note: Includes Taça da Liga)		Continental		Total	
Club	Season	Division	Apps	Goals	Apps	Goals	Apps	Goals	Apps	Goals	Apps	Goals
Raja CA	2015–16	Botola	12	1	0	0	–		–		12	1
Raja CA	2016–17	Botola	5	0	0	0	–		–		5	0
Raja CA	Total		17	1	0	0	–		–		17	1
Ittihad Tanger	2017–18	Botola	6	0	0	0	–		–		6	0
Oliveirense	2018–19	Liga Portugal 2	17	3	0	0	0	0	–		17	3
Oliveirense	2019–20	Liga Portugal 2	15	2	1	0	2	1	–		18	3
Oliveirense	Total		32	5	1	0	2	1	–		35	6
Académica	2020–21	Liga Portugal 2	29	14	2	1	0	0	–		31	15
C.D. Santa Clara	2021–22	Primeira Liga	9	0	1	0	2	0	2 (Note: Appearances in UEFA Europa Conference League)	0	14	0
CF Fuenlabrada (loan)	2021–22	Segunda División	17	7	0	0	–		–		17	7
Levante UD	2022–23	Segunda División	36	8	4	0	–		4 (Note: Appearances in the 2023 Segunda División play-offs)	0	44	8
Levante UD	2023–24	Segunda División	10	5	0	0	–		–		10	5
Levante UD	Total		46	13	4	0	0	0	4	0	54	13
Career total			156	40	8	1	4	1	6	0	174	42

== Honours ==
Ittihad Tanger

- Botola: 2017–18
