= Paolo Gozzi =

Italian footballer (born 2001)

Personal information
- Full name: Paolo Gozzi Andy Iweru
- Date of birth: 25 April 2001 (age 25)
- Place of birth: Turin, Italy
- Height: 1.87 m (6 ft 2 in)
- Position: Defender

Team information
- Current team: Troyes
- Number: 25

Youth career
- –2018: Juventus

Senior career*
Years	Team	Apps	(Gls)
2018–2022	Juventus U23	12	(0)
2019–2022	Juventus	1	(0)
2021–2022	→ Fuenlabrada (loan)	23	(0)
2022–2024	Genoa	0	(0)
2022–2023	→ Cosenza (loan)	12	(0)
2023	→ Pescara (loan)	0	(0)
2023–2024	→ Red Star (loan)	24	(0)
2024–	Troyes	31	(0)

International career^{‡}
2017	Italy U16	6	(0)
2017	Italy U17	14	(0)
2018	Italy U19	11	(0)
Medal record
Representing Italy
UEFA European Under-17 Championship
Runner-up	England 2018	U-17 Team
- * Club domestic league appearances and goals as of 11 May 2026 ‡ National team caps and goals as of 13 April 2019

Paolo Gozzi Andy Iweru (born 25 April 2001) is an Italian professional footballer who plays as a defender for French Ligue 1 club Troyes.

== Club career ==
=== Juventus ===
On 13 April 2019, Gozzi made his Juventus debut in a 2–1 away loss against SPAL in the Serie A.

==== Juventus U23 ====
Gozzi's first game for Juventus U23, the reserve team of Juventus, came on 28 October 2020, in a 2–1 Serie C defeat against Como.

==== Loan to Fuenlabrada ====
On 21 July 2021, Gozzi moved to Segunda División side Fuenlabrada on a season-long loan.

He played his first game for the Spanish side on 21 August, starting in a 2-0 away win against AD Alcorcón.

=== Genoa, loans to Cosenza, Pescara and Red Star ===
On 19 August 2022, Juventus announced to have sold Gozzi to Genoa on a permanent move. Shortly afterwards, Serie B club Cosenza announced to have signed him on loan from Genoa. The loan was terminated early on 31 January 2023. On the same day, Gozzi was loaned to Pescara. On 17 July 2023, Gozzi joined Championnat National club Red Star on loan.

=== Troyes ===
On 30 August 2024, Gozzi returned to France and signed a two-year contract with Ligue 2 club Troyes.

== International career ==
Gozzi was born in Italy and is of Nigerian Malagasy descent; he is a youth international for Italy.

With the Italy U19 team, he took part in the 2019 UEFA European Under-19 Championship.

== Career statistics ==
As of match played 29 June 2024

Appearances and goals by club, season and competition
Club	Season	League			National cup		Total	
Club	Season	Division	Apps	Goals	Apps	Goals	Apps	Goals
Juventus	2018–19	Serie A	1	0	0	0	1	0
Juventus U23	2020–21	Serie C	13	0	0	0	13	0
Fuenlabrada (loan)	2021–22	Segunda División	23	0	2	0	25	0
Cosenza (loan)	2022–23	Serie B	12	0	0	0	12	0
Pescara (loan)	2022–23	Serie C	2	0	0	0	2	0
Red Star (loan)	2023–24	Championnat National	24	0	1	0	25	0
Career total			75	0	3	0	78	0

== Honours ==
Red Star

- Championnat National: 2023–24
