= Jacques Dago =

Ivorian footballer (born 1999)

Personal information
- Date of birth: 10 March 1999 (age 27)
- Place of birth: Attécoubé, Ivory Coast
- Height: 1.87 m (6 ft 2 in)
- Position: Forward

Team information
- Current team: Melilla
- Number: 19

Youth career
- CO Korhogo

Senior career*
Years	Team	Apps	(Gls)
2021	Fuenlabrada B	8	(4)
2021–2022	Fuenlabrada Promesas	34	(10)
2021–2022	Fuenlabrada	7	(0)
2022–2023	Marbella	27	(23)
2023–2024	Alcoyano	0	(0)
2023–2024	→ Talavera (loan)	17	(0)
2024	→ Marbella (loan)	16	(5)
2024–2025	Estepona	31	(6)
2025–	Melilla	30	(3)
- * Club domestic league appearances and goals as of 16 May 2026

Jacques Dago (born 10 March 1999) is an Ivorian footballer who plays as a forward for Spanish Segunda Federación club Melilla.

== Club career ==
Having joined CF Fuenlabrada in 2021, Dago was initially assigned to the reserves in the regional leagues, and scored four times in only eight matches. He made his first team debut on 15 August 2021, coming on as a late substitute for Aboubakary Kanté in a 1–2 home loss against CD Tenerife, in the Segunda División.

On 14 July 2022, Dago joined Tercera División RFEF side Marbella FC.
