= Jaime Garrido =

Spanish footballer

Personal information
- Full name: Jaime Garrido Moya
- Date of birth: 19 April 2003 (age 23)
- Place of birth: Madrid, Spain
- Height: 1.84 m (6 ft 0 in)
- Position: Midfielder

Team information
- Current team: Deportivo B
- Number: 8

Youth career
- 2016–2018: Parla
- 2018–2019: Atlético Pinto
- 2019–2022: Fuenlabrada

Senior career*
Years	Team	Apps	(Gls)
2022	Fuenlabrada B	2	(1)
2022–2023	Fuenlabrada Promesas	24	(3)
2023–2024	Alcorcón B	18	(0)
2023–2024	Alcorcón	2	(0)
2024–	Deportivo B	46	(4)
- * Club domestic league appearances and goals as of 14 May 2026

Jaime Garrido Moya (born 19 April 2003) is a Spanish footballer who plays as a midfielder for Deportivo Fabril.

== Career ==
Born in Madrid, Garrido represented AD Parla, CA Pinto and CF Fuenlabrada as a youth. He made his senior debut with the latter's B-team on 30 January 2022, starting in a 6–1 Preferente de Madrid home loss to RSC Internacional FC, and scored his first senior goal three days later, in a 3–0 away win over CF Inter de Valdemoro.

Garrido was assigned to Fuenla Promesas in Tercera Federación ahead of the 2022–23 season, featuring regularly as the side suffered relegation. In July 2023, he moved to AD Alcorcón and was assigned to the reserves also in the fifth division, but making the entire pre-season with the main squad.

Garrido made his first team debut with Alkor on 14 August 2023, coming on as a second-half substitute for Jacobo González in a 4–0 Segunda División away loss to CD Mirandés.
