= Iván Alejo =

Spanish footballer

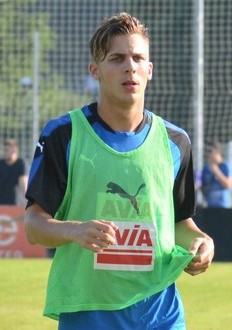
- Alejo with Eibar in 2017

Personal information
- Full name: Iván Alejo Peralta
- Date of birth: 10 February 1995 (age 31)
- Place of birth: Valladolid, Spain
- Height: 1.86 m (6 ft 1 in)
- Position: Winger

Team information
- Current team: Valladolid
- Number: 14

Youth career
- Parquesol
- 2003–2011: Valladolid
- 2011–2014: Atlético Madrid

Senior career*
Years	Team	Apps	(Gls)
2014	Atlético Madrid C	5	(0)
2014–2015	Atlético Madrid B	22	(1)
2015–2016	Villarreal B	17	(1)
2016–2017	Alcorcón	28	(1)
2017–2018	Eibar	21	(1)
2018–2020	Getafe	4	(0)
2019	→ Málaga (loan)	12	(0)
2019–2020	→ Cádiz (loan)	31	(1)
2020–2025	Cádiz	121	(3)
2025	→ APOEL (loan)	4	(0)
2025	APOEL	0	(0)
2025–	Valladolid	36	(1)

International career
2013–2014	Spain U19	12	(0)
- * Club domestic league appearances and goals as of 9 June 2026

Iván Alejo Peralta (born 10 February 1995) is a Spanish professional footballer who plays as a winger for Real Valladolid.

== Club career ==
Born in Valladolid, Castile and León, Alejo joined Atlético Madrid youth setup in 2011 from Real Valladolid. He made his senior debut for the former's C-team in 2014, in Tercera División.

Alejo was promoted to the reserves in Segunda División B in July 2014. After suffering relegation, he agreed to a three-year deal with another reserve team, Villarreal CF B also in the third division.

On 19 July 2016, Alejo signed a two-year contract with Segunda División club AD Alcorcón. He made his professional debut on 20 August, coming on as a second-half substitute for Sergio Aguza in a 0–0 home draw against SD Huesca.

Alejo scored his first goal as a professional on 13 May 2017, netting the first in a 2–0 home win against Rayo Vallecano, but was sent off a minute later. On 14 June, after helping the Madrid side avoid relegation, he signed a four-year contract with SD Eibar.

Alejo made his debut in La Liga on 21 August 2017, replacing goalscorer Charles in a 1–0 away win over Málaga CF. He scored his first goal in the category on 3 December, netting his team's second in a 3–1 home defeat of RCD Espanyol.

On 26 July 2018, Alejo signed a five-year contract with fellow top division side Getafe CF. The following 31 January, after being rarely used, he was loaned to second division side Málaga CF until the end of the season.

On 30 August 2019, Alejo moved to Cádiz CF in the second level, also in a temporary deal, signed until the end of the season. The following 22 July, after achieving promotion, the club exercised the obligatory buyout clause and signed him permanently until 2025.

On 31 December 2024, Alejo moved abroad for the first time in his career, after agreeing to a loan deal with Cypriot First Division side APOEL FC. He moved to the latter club permanently the following 1 July, but terminated his link shortly after and returned to his first club Valladolid on 9 July, signing a two-year contract.

== Personal life ==
In March 2020, Alejo donated €10,000 to the Hospital Clínico Universitario de Valladolid for the purchase of sanitary supplies needed during the COVID-19 pandemic.

== Career statistics ==
=== Club ===
As of match played 4 June 2023

Appearances and goals by club, season and competition
Club	Season	League			Copa del Rey		Europe		Other		Total	
Club	Season	Division	Apps	Goals	Apps	Goals	Apps	Goals	Apps	Goals	Apps	Goals
Atlético Madrid B	2014–15	Segunda División B	22	1	—		—		—		22	1
Villarreal B	2015–16	Segunda División B	17	1	—		—		—		17	1
Alcorcón	2016–17	Segunda División	28	1	7	2	—		—		35	3
Eibar	2017–18	La Liga	22	1	0	0	—		—		22	1
Getafe	2018–19	La Liga	4	0	3	0	—		—		7	0
Málaga (loan)	2018–19	Segunda División	12	0	0	0	—		—		12	0
Cádiz (loan)	2019–20	Segunda División	31	1	2	0	—		—		33	1
Cádiz	2020–21	La Liga	22	1	2	0	—		—		24	1
Cádiz	2021–22	La Liga	20	2	4	0	—		—		24	2
Cádiz	2022–23	La Liga	31	0	1	0	—		—		32	0
Cádiz	Total		73	3	7	0	—		—		90	3
Career total			209	8	19	2	0	0	0	0	228	10
