= Javier Ontiveros =

Spanish footballer (born 1997)

Javi Ontiveros
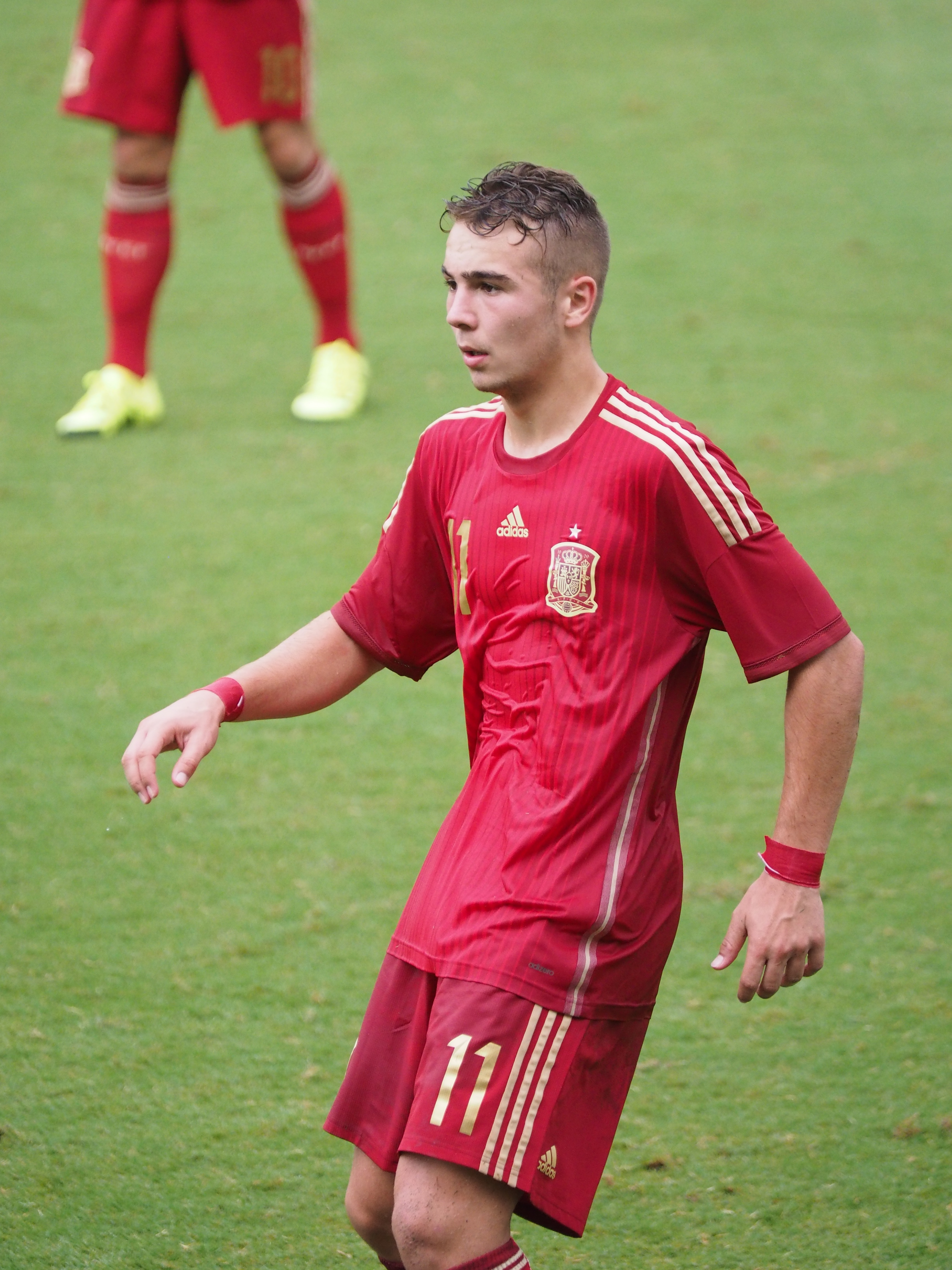
- Ontiveros with Spain U18 in 2015

Personal information
- Full name: Javier Ontiveros Parra
- Date of birth: 9 September 1997 (age 29)
- Place of birth: Marbella, Spain
- Height: 1.70 m (5 ft 7 in)
- Position: Winger

Team information
- Current team: Cádiz
- Number: 22

Youth career
- 2000–2008: Vázquez Cultural
- 2008–2010: Betis
- 2010–2015: Málaga

Senior career*
Years	Team	Apps	(Gls)
2015–2017	Málaga B	39	(16)
2015–2019	Málaga	65	(6)
2018	→ Valladolid (loan)	14	(0)
2019–2024	Villarreal	30	(2)
2020–2021	→ Huesca (loan)	20	(2)
2021–2022	→ Osasuna (loan)	3	(0)
2022	→ Fuenlabrada (loan)	16	(1)
2022–2024	Villarreal B	63	(12)
2024–	Cádiz	53	(11)

International career
2013	Spain U17	2	(0)
2015	Spain U18	4	(0)
2016	Spain U19	5	(2)
- * Club domestic league appearances and goals as of 22:36, 29 September 2026 (UTC)

Javier "Javi" Ontiveros Parra (born 9 September 1997) is a Spanish professional footballer who plays mainly as a right winger for Segunda División club Cádiz.

== Club career ==
=== Málaga ===
Born in Marbella, Province of Málaga, Andalusia, Ontiveros joined Málaga CF's youth setup in 2010, after spells at CD Vázquez Cultural and Real Betis. On 24 June 2015, even before appearing for the reserves, he was called up by manager Javi Gracia for the preseason with the main squad.

Ontiveros made his debut as a senior on 22 August 2015, coming on as a second-half substitute in a 2–0 away win against CD Comarca del Mármol in the Tercera División. He scored his first senior goal on 13 September, closing the 2–0 home victory over CD Rincón. He scored a brace in a 3–0 defeat of CD Español del Alquián on 31 October.

On 21 November 2015, Ontiveros made his first-team – and La Liga – debut, replacing Arthur Boka in a 2–0 away loss to RCD Espanyol. He only appeared in three matches more during the campaign, all from the bench, but scored 11 goals for the B team in the fourth division.

On 19 October 2016, Ontiveros scored once and provided three assists for Málaga's under-19 team in a 5–0 home rout of FC Nitra in the first round of the UEFA Youth League. He made his first league appearance of the season on 4 November 2016, in a 3–2 win over Sporting de Gijón; coming on in the 57th minute, he assisted Sandro Ramírez for the second goal eight minutes later. He scored his first professional goal on 26 November, a last-minute winner in the 4–3 home victory against Deportivo de La Coruña.

Ontiveros was loaned to Segunda División side Real Valladolid in January 2018, until the end of the campaign. He helped them to win promotion to the top flight in the play-offs, and subsequently returned to his parent club, now also in the second tier.

=== Villarreal ===
On 20 August 2019, Ontiveros signed a five-year contract with Villarreal CF. On 24 September of the following year, having been mainly used as a substitute, he moved to SD Huesca of the same league on loan for one year, where he started under Míchel but became a fringe player under Pacheta.

On 27 August 2021, Ontiveros joined CA Osasuna also in the top division, on loan for the season. This arrangement was terminated on 29 January 2022, and he agreed to a permanent four-and-a-half-year deal at CF Fuenlabrada hours later; Villarreal also retained a buy-back clause.

After Fuenlabrada's relegation, Ontiveros was not purchased by the club, and he returned to the Estadio de la Cerámica in July 2022. He spent the 2022–23 campaign with Villarreal's B team in division two, where he struggled to get significant playing time.

Ontiveros scored a career-best nine goals in 2023–24 while also providing five assists, but his side went down as last; subsequently, he became a free agent.

=== Later career ===
On 20 June 2024, Ontiveros signed a four-year contract at Cádiz CF, also recently relegated but from the top tier.

== Career statistics ==
As of match played 26 May 2024

Appearances and goals by club, season and competition
Club	Season	League			National Cup		Other		Total	
Club	Season	Division	Apps	Goals	Apps	Goals	Apps	Goals	Apps	Goals
Málaga	2015–16	La Liga	4	0	2	0	—		6	0
Málaga	2016–17	La Liga	18	2	2	0	—		20	2
Málaga	2017–18	La Liga	12	0	2	0	—		14	0
Málaga	2018–19	Segunda División	31	4	1	0	2 (Note: Appearances in La Liga play-offs)	1	34	5
Málaga	2019–20	Segunda División	0	0	0	0	—		0	0
Málaga	Total		65	6	7	0	2	1	74	7
Valladolid (loan)	2017–18	Segunda División	14	0	0	0	3	0	17	0
Villarreal	2019–20	La Liga	30	2	5	1	—		35	3
Villarreal	2020–21	La Liga	0	0	0	0	—		0	0
Villarreal	Total		30	2	5	1	0	0	35	3
Huesca (loan)	2020–21	La Liga	20	2	1	0	—		22	2
Osasuna (loan)	2021–22	La Liga	3	0	2	1	—		5	1
Fuenlabrada (loan)	2021–22	Segunda División	16	1	0	0	—		16	1
Villarreal B	2022–23	Segunda División	25	3	—		—		25	3
Villarreal B	2023–24	Segunda División	38	9	—		—		38	9
Villarreal B	Total		63	12	0	0	0	0	63	12
Career total			211	23	15	2	5	1	231	26
