= Iván Rodríguez (footballer, born 1996) =

Spanish footballer (born 1996)

Personal information
- Full name: Iván Rodríguez del Pozo
- Date of birth: 30 April 1996 (age 30)
- Place of birth: Alameda, Spain
- Height: 1.80 m (5 ft 11 in)
- Position: Right back

Team information
- Current team: Antequera
- Number: 19

Youth career
- 2002–2005: Málaga EF Alameda
- 2005–2007: La Unidad Nueva Málaga
- 2007–2014: Málaga

Senior career*
Years	Team	Apps	(Gls)
2013–2018	Málaga B	83	(7)
2018–2020	Málaga	21	(0)
2020	→ Ponferradina (loan)	6	(1)
2020–2022	Ponferradina	38	(1)
2023	Rayo Majadahonda	17	(0)
2023–2024	Córdoba	22	(1)
2024–	Antequera	29	(0)

International career
2012	Spain U16	1	(0)
- * Club domestic league appearances and goals as of 10 June 2026

Iván Rodríguez del Pozo (born 30 April 1996) is a Spanish footballer who plays as a right back for Antequera.

== Club career ==
Born in Alameda, Málaga, Andalusia, Rodríguez finished his formation with Málaga CF. On 8 December 2013, aged just 17, he made his senior debut with the reserves by starting in a 1–0 Tercera División away win against Los Villares CF.

Rodríguez scored his first senior goal on 31 January 2015, netting his team's second from the midfield in a 2–2 draw at UD Maracena. He made his first team – and La Liga – debut on 15 April 2018, coming on as a second-half substitute for injured Ignasi Miquel in a 1–2 home loss against Real Madrid.

On 19 November 2018, after becoming a starter for the first team now in Segunda División, Rodríguez renewed his contract until 2022. For the 2019–20 campaign, however, he was not registered in the first team squad due to the club's poor financial status.

On 20 January 2020, Rodríguez was loaned to fellow second division side SD Ponferradina for the remainder of the campaign. Despite featuring rarely, he signed a permanent deal with the club on 8 August, after terminating his contract with Málaga.
