= Jack Harper (footballer) =

Scottish footballer (born 1996)

Personal information
- Date of birth: 28 February 1996 (age 30)
- Place of birth: Málaga, Spain
- Height: 1.85 m (6 ft 1 in)
- Position: Forward

Team information
- Current team: Igea Virtus

Youth career
- 2003–2009: Fuengirola Los Boliches
- 2009–2015: Real Madrid
- 2015–2017: Brighton & Hove Albion

Senior career*
Years	Team	Apps	(Gls)
2017–2018	Málaga B	50	(24)
2018–2019	Málaga	26	(4)
2019–2023	Getafe	0	(0)
2019–2020	→ Alcorcón (loan)	13	(0)
2020–2021	→ Cartagena (loan)	6	(0)
2021	→ Villarreal B (loan)	11	(2)
2021–2022	→ Racing Santander (loan)	17	(2)
2022–2023	→ Hércules (loan)	17	(2)
2023–2024	Marbella	23	(5)
2024–2025	Linense	32	(9)
2025–2026	Linares	17	(7)
2026–	Igea Virtus	0	(0)

International career
2010–2012	Scotland U15		
2012	Scotland U17	6	(1)
2014	Scotland U19	3	(0)
- * Club domestic league appearances and goals as of 15 May 2026

Jack Harper (born 28 February 1996) is a professional footballer who plays as a forward for Italian Serie D club Igea Virtus. Born and raised in Spain, he represented his parents' birthplace Scotland at youth international levels.

== Early life ==
Harper was born in Málaga, Andalusia, Spain, to Scottish parents. He speaks both English (with a Scottish accent) and Spanish. He grew up in Fuengirola.

His brothers Ryan and Mac were also footballers. Ryan was born in Barrhead in Scotland before the family moved to Spain in the mid-1990s.

== Club career ==
=== Youth career ===
Harper played for Fuengirola Los Boliches between 2003 and 2009. After trialling with Sevilla and Almería, Harper signed an initial 12-month contract with Real Madrid in 2009, at the age of 13. He moved to Madrid to live at the club's training ground, and attended private school.

In December 2012, Harper signed a new five-year contract with Real Madrid. In June 2014 he signed a further contract extension with the club. At the age of 18, with two years left on his contract, he chose to leave Real Madrid after the club said they wanted to loan him out.

He signed for English club Brighton & Hove Albion in July 2015. He was injured for the first six months of his time with Brighton.

=== Senior career ===
==== Málaga ====
Harper returned to Spain with Málaga in January 2017. He spent the end of the 2016–17 season and all of 2017–18 with the Málaga B team, helping them to achieve promotion to the third tier via the playoffs in the latter campaign having lost out due to a last-minute goal in the final round the previous year.

He made his first-team debut on 18 August 2018, starting in a 2–1 away win against CD Lugo in the Segunda División. He scored his first professional goal on 3 September, netting the winner in a 1–0 away success over UD Almería.

==== Getafe ====
Harper signed a pre-contract agreement with Getafe in February 2019 and completed the move in July. On 10 August, he was loaned to second division side Alcorcón for one year.

On 5 October 2020, transfer deadline day, Harper joined FC Cartagena, newly promoted to division two, on loan for one year. On 1 February 2021, he moved to Villarreal CF B in the third division, also on loan. On 6 July 2021, he was loaned out to the third-tier again, this time joining Racing de Santander.

On 21 July 2022, Harper moved to Hércules CF also on a one-year loan deal. In July of the following year, he left Getafe.

=== Marbella ===
On 26 July 2023, Harper signed a one-year contract with Marbella FC in the Segunda Federación.

=== Linense ===
On 17 July 2024, Harper joined Linense in the fourth-tier Segunda Federación.

=== Igea Virtus ===
In July 2026 he signed for Italian Serie D club Igea Virtus.

== International career ==
Harper has elected to represent Scotland at international level, saying that "even though I live in Spain, I feel Scottish, so I want to make my family proud and play for my country." He has stated his ambition to play for Scotland at the FIFA World Cup.

He was called up by the under-15 squad in April 2010, and by the under-16s in July 2011. He made his under-17 national debut in August 2012. He made a total of six appearances for the under-17s in 2012, scoring once. He made his debut for the under-19s in August 2014, making three appearances for them that year. He was dropped from the under-19s in March 2015.

He was selected for the Scotland under-21 squad in March 2017, but did not play.

== Playing style ==
Harper has been compared to Robin van Persie.

== Honours ==
Atlético Malagueño

- Tercera División Group 9: 2016–17, 2017–18

== See also ==
- British migration to Spain
