= Aboubakary Kanté =

Gambian footballer (born 1994)

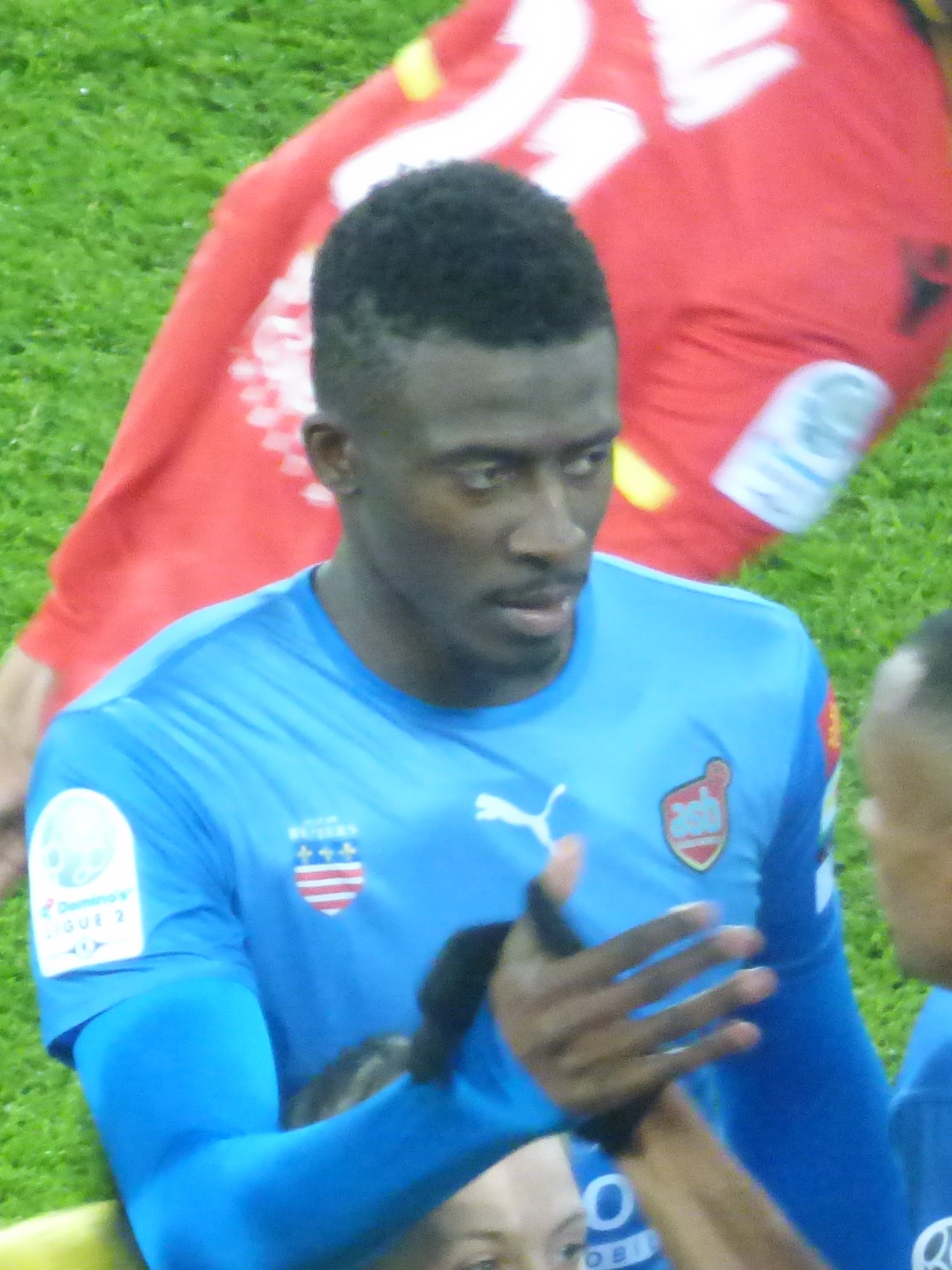
- Kanté playing for Béziers in 2019

Personal information
- Date of birth: 11 August 1994 (age 32)
- Place of birth: Pontoise, France
- Height: 1.84 m (6 ft 0 in)
- Position: Forward

Team information
- Current team: Laval

Youth career
- 2011–2012: Red Star
- 2012–2013: Racing

Senior career*
Years	Team	Apps	(Gls)
2013–2016	Paris FC II	34	(17)
2013–2016	Paris FC	10	(1)
2016	→ CA Bastia (loan)	5	(0)
2016–2017	AS Saint-Ouen-l'Aumône	12	(6)
2017–2019	Béziers	55	(17)
2019–2020	Cercle Brugge	3	(0)
2019–2020	→ Le Mans (loan)	18	(4)
2020–2022	Fuenlabrada	61	(9)
2022–2024	Huesca	41	(3)
2024–2025	AC Ajaccio	25	(6)
2025–2026	Dunkerque	27	(1)
2026–	Laval	0	(0)

International career^{‡}
2021–	Gambia	1	(0)
- * Club domestic league appearances and goals as of 11 May 2026 ‡ National team caps and goals as of 18:35, 14 July 2022 (UTC)

Aboubakary Kanté (born 11 August 1994) is a professional footballer who plays as a forward for Ligue 2 club Laval. Born in France, he plays for the Gambia national team.

== Club career ==
Aboubakar began playing football at the age of 6, and played for various clubs in Paris. He joined Paris FC in 2013. He joined Béziers in 2017 after a couple of seasons in the lower divisions of France, and helped them get promoted into the Ligue 2.

Kanté made his professional debut in a 2–0 Ligue 2 win over AS Nancy on 27 July 2018. On 5 June 2019, Kanté joined Belgian club Cercle Brugge on a three-year contract. However, in the beginning of September 2019, after having only played about 65 minutes in three games, he was loaned out to Le Mans FC, according to him because he didn't felt like the club trusted him.

On 23 August 2020, Kanté agreed to a three-year contract with Spanish Segunda División side CF Fuenlabrada. On 14 July 2022, after Fuenla's relegation, he moved to fellow second division side SD Huesca on a two-year deal.

On 29 January 2024, Kanté terminated his contract with Huesca.

On 15 August 2025, Kanté signed a two-year contract with Dunkerque in Ligue 2.

On 28 June 2026, he joined Laval, also in Ligue 2.

== International career ==
Kanté was born in France and is of Gambian descent. He debuted for the Gambia in a 1–0 friendly win over Togo on 8 June 2021.

== Career statistics ==
As of match played 14 July 2022

Appearances and goals by club, season and competition
Club	Season	League			National cup		League cup		Other		Total	
Club	Season	Division	Apps	Goals	Apps	Goals	Apps	Goals	Apps	Goals	Apps	Goals
Paris	2013–14	Championnat National	5	1	0	0	—		—		5	1
Paris	2014–15	Championnat National	5	0	0	0	—		—		5	0
Paris	Total		10	1	0	0	0	0	0	0	10	1
Paris II	2013–14	CFA 2	21	11	—						21	11
Paris II	2014–15	CFA 2	11	6	—						11	6
Paris II	2015–16	CFA 2	2	0	—						2	0
Paris II	Total		34	17	0	0	0	0	0	0	34	17
CA Bastia (loan)	2015–16	Championnat National	5	0	0	0	—		—		5	0
Saint-Ouen-l'Aumône	2016–17	CFA 2	12	6	0	0	—		—		12	6
Béziers	2017–18	Championnat National	21	7	0	0	—		—		21	7
Béziers	2018–19	Ligue 2	34	10	1	1	0	0	—		35	11
Béziers	Total		55	17	1	1	0	0	0	0	56	18
Cercle Brugge	2019–20	First Division A	3	0	0	0	—		—		3	0
Le Mans	2019–20	Ligue 2	18	4	2	0	1	0	—		21	4
Fuenlabrada	2020–21	Segunda División	36	4	2	0	—		—		38	4
Fuenlabrada	2021–22	Segunda División	25	5	1	0	—		—		26	5
Fuenlabrada	Total		61	9	3	0	—		0	0	64	9
Huesca	2022–23	Segunda División	0	0	0	0	—		0	0	0	0
Career total			198	54	6	1	1	0	0	0	205	55
