= 2023–24 Cádiz CF season =

Cádiz CF
2023–24 season
- President: Manuel Vizcaíno
- Head coach: Sergio González (until 20 January); Mauricio Pellegrino (from 24 January)
- Stadium: Nuevo Mirandilla
- La Liga: 18th (relegated)
- Copa del Rey: Second round
- Top goalscorer: League: Chris Ramos (5); All: Chris Ramos (5)
- Highest home attendance: 20,325 vs Real Madrid
- Lowest home attendance: 15,346 vs Real Betis
- Average home league attendance: 18,016
| Home colours | Away colours | Third colours |

The 2023–24 season was Cádiz Club de Fútbol's 114th season in existence and fourth consecutive season in La Liga. They also competed in the Copa del Rey.

Cádiz struggled throughout the season, only managing to win two out of the first 27 league matches. After losing to Alavés in the 21st round, head coach Sergio González was replaced by Mauricio Pellegrino. On 19 May 2024, Cádiz was officially relegated to the Segunda División after four seasons in the top flight.

== Players ==
=== First-team squad ===
As of 1 February 2024

Note: Flags indicate national team as defined under FIFA eligibility rules; some limited exceptions apply. Players may hold more than one non-FIFA nationality.

| No. | Pos. | Nation | Player |
|---|---|---|---|
| 1 | GK | ARG | Conan Ledesma (4th captain) |
| 2 | DF | ESP | Joseba Zaldúa |
| 3 | DF | ESP | Fali (3rd captain) |
| 4 | MF | ESP | Rubén Alcaraz |
| 5 | DF | ESP | Víctor Chust |
| 6 | MF | MLI | Diadie Samassékou (on loan from TSG Hoffenheim) |
| 7 | FW | ESP | Rubén Sobrino |
| 8 | MF | ESP | Álex Fernández (vice-captain) |
| 9 | FW | ESP | Juanmi (on loan from Real Betis) |
| 10 | FW | URU | Brian Ocampo |
| 11 | FW | ESP | Iván Alejo |
| 12 | MF | MLI | Rominigue Kouamé |
| 13 | GK | ESP | David Gil |
| 14 | DF | SEN | Momo Mbaye |
| 15 | DF | ESP | Javi Hernández (on loan from Leganés) |

| No. | Pos. | Nation | Player |
|---|---|---|---|
| 16 | FW | ESP | Chris Ramos |
| 17 | MF | ARG | Gonzalo Escalante |
| 18 | FW | VEN | Darwin Machís (on loan from Valladolid) |
| 19 | FW | ESP | Sergi Guardiola |
| 20 | DF | ESP | Iza Carcelén (5th captain) |
| 21 | FW | ESP | Roger Martí |
| 22 | DF | ESP | Jorge Meré (on loan from América) |
| 23 | DF | ESP | Luis Hernández |
| 24 | DF | SYR | Aiham Ousou (on loan from Slavia Prague) |
| 25 | FW | URU | Maxi Gómez (on loan from Trabzonspor) |
| 27 | MF | ESP | Robert Navarro (on loan from Real Sociedad) |
| 33 | DF | BRA | Lucas Pires (on loan from Santos) |
| — | MF | ESP | Fede San Emeterio |
| — | MF | ESP | José Mari (captain) |

=== Reserve team ===
Note: Flags indicate national team as defined under FIFA eligibility rules; some limited exceptions apply. Players may hold more than one non-FIFA nationality.

| No. | Pos. | Nation | Player |
|---|---|---|---|
| 26 | GK | BRA | Victor Aznar |
| 28 | MF | MLI | Moussa Diakité |
| 29 | FW | CMR | Nico Njalla |
| 30 | DF | ESP | Álex Morata |
| 31 | DF | ESP | Adri Miranda |

| No. | Pos. | Nation | Player |
|---|---|---|---|
| 32 | DF | ESP | Julio Cabrera |
| 34 | GK | ESP | Nando Almodóvar |
| 35 | DF | ESP | Adrián Salguero |
| 36 | MF | CMR | Etta Eyong |

=== Other players under contract ===
Note: Flags indicate national team as defined under FIFA eligibility rules; some limited exceptions apply. Players may hold more than one non-FIFA nationality.

| No. | Pos. | Nation | Player |
|---|---|---|---|
| — | MF | MLI | Youba Diarra |

=== Out on loan ===
Note: Flags indicate national team as defined under FIFA eligibility rules; some limited exceptions apply. Players may hold more than one non-FIFA nationality.

| No. | Pos. | Nation | Player |
|---|---|---|---|
| — | DF | PAR | Santiago Arzamendia (at Cerro Porteño until 30 June 2024) |
| — | DF | ESP | Carlos García-Die (at Córdoba until 30 June 2024) |
| — | MF | CHI | Tomás Alarcón (at Cartagena until 30 June 2024) |
| — | MF | ESP | Álvaro Bastida (at Atlético Sanluqueño until 30 June 2024) |
| — | MF | ZAM | Francisco Mwepu (at Atlético Sanluqueño until 30 June 2024) |

| No. | Pos. | Nation | Player |
|---|---|---|---|
| — | MF | ESP | Martín Calderón (at Atlético Sanluqueño until 30 June 2024) |
| — | FW | ESP | Álvaro Jiménez (at Tenerife until 30 June 2024) |
| — | FW | ESP | Rafa Llorente (at Linares until 30 June 2024) |
| — | FW | ESP | Peru Ruiz (at Real Unión until 30 June 2024) |

== Transfers ==
=== In ===
| Pos. | Player | Transferred from | Fee | Date | Source |
|---|---|---|---|---|---|
| FW | (Venezuela) Darwin Machís | (Spain) Valladolid | Loan | 1 July 2023 | |
| FW | (Spain) Sergi Guardiola | (Spain) Valladolid | €1,000,000 | 1 July 2023 | |
| MF | (Argentina) Gonzalo Escalante | (Italy) Lazio | €2,500,000 | 1 July 2023 | |
| DF | (Brazil) Lucas Pires | (Brazil) Santos | Loan | 25 July 2023 | |
| FW | (Uruguay) Maxi Gómez | (Turkey) Trabzonspor | Loan | 22 August 2023 | |
| MF | (Spain) Robert Navarro | (Spain) Real Sociedad | Loan | 1 September 2023 | |
| MF | (Mali) Rominigue Kouamé | (France) Troyes | €2,500,000 | 1 September 2023 | |
| DF | (Syria) Aiham Ousou | (Czech Republic) Slavia Prague | Loan | 1 February 2024 | |
| MF | (Spain) Juanmi | (Spain) Real Betis | Loan | 1 February 2024 | |
| MF | (Mali) Diadie Samassékou | (Germany) 1899 Hoffenheim | Loan | 1 February 2024 | |

=== Out ===
| Pos. | Player | Transferred to | Fee | Date | Source |
|---|---|---|---|---|---|
| FW | (Honduras) Anthony Lozano | (Spain) Getafe | Free | 1 July 2023 | |
| DF | (Uruguay) Alfonso Espino | (Spain) Rayo Vallecano | Free | 1 July 2023 | |
| MF | (Democratic Republic of the Congo) Théo Bongonda | (Russia) Spartak Moscow | €7,000,000 | 12 July 2023 | |
| FW | (Australia) Awer Mabil | (Switzerland) Grasshopper Club Zürich | Undisclosed | 21 August 2023 | |
| MF | (Chile) Tomás Alarcón | (Spain) FC Cartagena | Loan | 23 August 2023 | |
| FW | (Montenegro) Milutin Osmajić | (England) Preston North End | €2,500,000 | 1 September 2023 | |

== Pre-season and friendlies ==
Win Draw Loss

| 14 July 2023 Friendly | Cádiz | 5–0 | Barbate | Benalup-Casas Viejas |
| 19:30 UTC+2 | Ramos 16'; Negredo 21'; Roger 61'; Osmajić 69'; Fernández 72' | | | Stadium: Campo de Deportes Benalup |

| 23 July 2023 Friendly | Espanyol | 0–1 | Cádiz | San Pedro de Alcántara |
| 19:30 UTC+2 | | Report | Mbaye 57' | Stadium: Marbella Football Center |

| 4 August 2023 Trofeo Puertas de Córdoba | Córdoba | 1–1 (4–5 p) | Cádiz | Córdoba |
| 20:30 UTC+2 | Gudelj 82' | Report | Machís 87' | Stadium: Estadio Nuevo Arcángel; Referee: Munuera Montero |

| 6 August 2023 Ramón de Carranza Trophy | Cádiz | 1–1 (3–1 p) | Lecce | Cádiz |
| 17:00 UTC+2 | Alejo (yellow card) 35'; Roger 40'; Fali (yellow card) 78' | Report | Almqvist 13'; Strefezza (yellow card) 24' | Stadium: Nuevo Mirandilla; Attendance: 16,017; Referee: Francisco José Hernandez Maeso |
| | Penalties |
| | L. Hernández (penalty missed); Negredo (penalty scored); Bastida (penalty scored); Lucas Pires (penalty scored) | | (penalty missed) Strefezza; (penalty scored) Ceesay; (penalty missed) Gonzàlez; (penalty missed) Maleh |

| 16 November 2023 Friendly | Atlético Sanluqueño | 0–2 | Cádiz | Sanlúcar de Barrameda |
| 18:00 UTC+1 | | | Gómez 59'; Fernández 81' | Stadium: El Palmar |

| 22 March 2024 Friendly | Cádiz | 1–1 | Como | Puerto Real |
| 11:00 UTC+1 | Ramos 21' | | Fumagalli 68' | Stadium: Ciudad Deportiva de El Rosal |

== Competitions ==
=== Overall record ===
| Competition | First match | Last match | Starting round | Final position | Record | | | | | | | |
| Competition | First match | Last match | Starting round | Final position | Pld | W | D | L | GF | GA | GD | Win % |
|---|---|---|---|---|---|---|---|---|---|---|---|---|
| La Liga | 14 August 2023 | 25 May 2024 | Matchday 1 | 18th | 38 | 6 | 15 | 17 | 26 | 55 | −29 | 15.79 |
| Copa del Rey | 1 November 2023 | 7 December 2023 | First round | Second round | 2 | 0 | 1 | 1 | 1 | 2 | −1 | 0.00 |
| Total | | | | | 40 | 6 | 16 | 18 | 27 | 57 | −30 | 15.00 |

Source: Soccerway

=== La Liga ===
==== League table ====
| Pos | Team | Pld | W | D | L | GF | GA | GD | Pts | Qualification or relegation |
|---|---|---|---|---|---|---|---|---|---|---|
| 16 | Las Palmas | 38 | 10 | 10 | 18 | 33 | 47 | −14 | 40 (Note: Mallorca finished ahead of Las Palmas on head-to-head points: Las Palmas 1–1 Mallorca, Mallorca 1–0 Las Palmas.) | |
| 17 | Rayo Vallecano | 38 | 8 | 14 | 16 | 29 | 48 | −19 | 38 | |
| 18 | Cádiz (R) | 38 | 6 | 15 | 17 | 26 | 55 | −29 | 33 | Relegation to Segunda División |
| 19 | Almería (R) | 38 | 3 | 12 | 23 | 43 | 75 | −32 | 21 (Note: Tied on head-to-head points. Almería finished ahead of Granada on overall goal difference.) | Relegation to Segunda División |
| 20 | Granada (R) | 38 | 4 | 9 | 25 | 38 | 79 | −41 | 21 | Relegation to Segunda División |

Source: LaLiga EA Sports
Rules for classification: 1) Points; 2) Head-to-head points; 3) Head-to-head goal difference; 4) Goal difference; 5) Goals scored; 6) Fair-play points
(Note: Head-to-head record is used only after all the matches between the teams in question have been played)
(R) Relegation

==== Results summary ====
| Overall | | | | | | | | Home | | | | | | Away | | | | | |
| Pld | W | D | L | GF | GA | GD | Pts | W | D | L | GF | GA | GD | W | D | L | GF | GA | GD |
|---|---|---|---|---|---|---|---|---|---|---|---|---|---|---|---|---|---|---|---|
| 38 | 6 | 15 | 17 | 26 | 55 | −29 | 33 | 5 | 9 | 5 | 16 | 19 | −3 | 1 | 6 | 12 | 10 | 36 | −26 |

Source: La Liga

==== Results by round ====
| Round | 1 | 2 | 3 | 4 | 5 | 6 | 7 | 8 | 9 | 10 | 11 | 12 | 13 | 14 | 15 | 16 | 17 | 18 | 19 | 20 | 21 | 22 | 23 | 24 | 25 | 26 | 27 | 28 | 29 | 30 | 31 | 32 | 33 | 34 | 35 | 36 | 37 | 38 |
|---|---|---|---|---|---|---|---|---|---|---|---|---|---|---|---|---|---|---|---|---|---|---|---|---|---|---|---|---|---|---|---|---|---|---|---|---|---|---|
| Ground | H | A | H | H | A | A | H | A | H | A | H | A | A | H | A | H | A | H | A | H | A | H | A | H | A | H | A | H | A | H | H | A | H | A | H | A | H | A |
| Result | W | L | D | W | L | D | D | L | L | L | D | L | D | L | D | D | D | D | L | L | L | D | D | L | L | D | D | W | L | W | L | L | D | L | W | W | D | L |
| Position | 7 | 12 | 10 | 6 | 8 | 9 | 9 | 12 | 13 | 16 | 15 | 16 | 16 | 16 | 16 | 17 | 16 | 17 | 18 | 18 | 18 | 18 | 18 | 18 | 18 | 18 | 18 | 18 | 18 | 18 | 18 | 18 | 18 | 18 | 18 | 18 | 18 | 18 |

Source: La Liga
A = Away; H = Home; W = Win; D = Draw; L = Loss

==== Matches ====
The league fixtures were unveiled on 22 June 2023.

| 14 August 2023 1 | Cádiz | 1–0 | Alavés | Cádiz |
| 19:30 CEST (UTC+2) | San Emeterio 7'; L. Hernández (yellow card) 67'; Sobrino (yellow card) 75'; Fali (yellow card) 84'; Escalante (red card) 88' | Report | Sedlar (yellow card) 48'; Duarte (yellow card) 52' | Stadium: Nuevo Mirandilla; Attendance: 19,306; Referee: Isidro Díaz de Mera Escuderos |

| 20 August 2023 2 | Barcelona | 2–0 | Cádiz | Barcelona |
| 19:30 CEST (UTC+2) | De Jong (yellow card) 26'; Ter Stegen (yellow card) 26'; Gavi (yellow card) 45+6'; Pedri (yellow card) 73', (goal) 82'; Torres 90+4' | Report | Alejo (yellow card) 14'; San Emeterio (yellow card) 45+2'; J. Hernández (yellow card) 90+3' | Stadium: Estadi Olímpic Lluís Companys; Attendance: 39,603; Referee: Alejandro Muñiz Ruiz |

| 26 August 2023 3 | Cádiz | 1–1 | Almería | Cádiz |
| 19:00 CEST (UTC+2) | L. Hernández 59'; San Emeterio (red card) 90+10' | Report | Puigmal (yellow card) 9'; González (yellow card) 27' (yellow-red card) 50'; Suárez (yellow card) 72'; Ramazani (yellow card) 90'; Kaiky 90+5' | Stadium: Nuevo Mirandilla; Attendance: 18,653; Referee: Víctor García Verdura |

| 1 September 2023 4 | Cádiz | 3–1 | Villarreal | Cádiz |
| 19:30 CEST (UTC+2) | Ramos 18', (yellow card) 19'; Machís 30' (pen.), 50'; Alejo (yellow card) 22'; L. Hernández (yellow card) 80'; Fali (yellow card) 82'; Alcaraz (yellow card) 86' | Report | Sørloth 10'; Pedraza (red card) 22'; Albiol (yellow card) 35'; Cuenca (yellow card) 53'; Baena (yellow card) 61'; Comesaña (yellow card) 90+5' | Stadium: Nuevo Mirandilla; Attendance: 18,557; Referee: Juan Luis Pulido Santana |

| 16 September 2023 5 | Athletic Bilbao | 3–0 | Cádiz | Bilbao |
| 14:00 CEST (UTC+2) | Paredes (yellow card) 45+2'; Guruzeta 66'; Villalibre 68'; I. Williams 90' | Report | Fali (yellow card) 46'; Alcaraz (yellow card) 50'; Gómez (yellow card) 87'; J. Hernández (yellow card) 90+3' | Stadium: San Mamés; Attendance: 42,881; Referee: Guillermo Cuadra Fernández |

| 24 September 2023 6 | Real Betis | 1–1 | Cádiz | Seville |
| 18:30 CEST (UTC+2) | Miranda (yellow card) 45'; Rodríguez 60'; Isco (yellow card) 90+6' | Report | Alejo (yellow card) 38'; Ramos 41'; Alcaraz (yellow card) 57'; Sobrino (yellow card) 90+6' | Stadium: Benito Villamarín; Attendance: 56,087; Referee: Miguel Ángel Ortiz Arias |

| 27 September 2023 7 | Cádiz | 0–0 | Rayo Vallecano | Cádiz |
| 21:30 CEST (UTC+2) | Gómez (yellow card) 5'; J. Hernández (yellow card) 45+4'; Alejo (yellow card) 51'; L. Hernández (yellow card) 59'; Alcaraz (yellow card) 73' | Report | Trejo (yellow card) 43'; Chavarría (yellow card) 43'; Espino (yellow card) 44'; Ciss (yellow card) 68'; Lejeune (yellow card) 82'; Mumin (yellow card) 88' (yellow-red card) 88' | Stadium: Nuevo Mirandilla; Attendance: 18,505; Referee: Francisco José Hernández Maeso |

| 1 October 2023 8 | Atlético Madrid | 3–2 | Cádiz | Madrid |
| 21:00 CEST (UTC+2) | Koke (yellow card) 14'; Correa 32', 66'; Molina 46' | Report | Lucas Pires 12'; Roger 27', (yellow card) 39'; Sobrino (yellow card) 90+2'; Kouamé (yellow card) 90+3' | Stadium: Cívitas Metropolitano; Attendance: 53,421; Referee: Javier Iglesias Villanueva |

| 7 October 2023 9 | Cádiz | 0–1 | Girona | Cádiz |
| 14:00 CEST (UTC+2) | Alcaraz (yellow card) 2'; Machís (red card) 10' | Report | A. García (yellow card) 4', (goal) 59'; Herrera (yellow card) 45+4'; Kébé (yellow card) 90' | Stadium: Nuevo Mirandilla; Attendance: 16,438; Referee: Juan Martínez Munuera |

| 23 October 2023 10 | Valencia | 2–0 | Cádiz | Valencia |
| 21:00 CEST (UTC+2) | Gayà 4'; Duro 25' | Report | Navarro (red card) 22'; Lucas Pires (yellow card) 68'; Fali (yellow card) 71'; Sobrino (yellow card) 90+2' | Stadium: Mestalla; Attendance: 41,647; Referee: Pablo González Fuertes |

| 28 October 2023 11 | Cádiz | 2–2 | Sevilla | Cádiz |
| 21:00 CEST (UTC+2) | Mari (yellow card) 4'; Ramos 8'; Alejo (yellow card) 11'; Fali (yellow card) 14'; Kouamé (yellow card) 24'; Machís 28'; Lucas Pires (yellow card) 45+6'; Sobrino (yellow card) 77' | Report | Ramos (yellow card) 3'; Ocampos 37', (yellow card) 71'; Soumaré (yellow card) 45+1'; Rakitić 60'; Acuña (yellow card) 79' | Stadium: Nuevo Mirandilla; Attendance: 18,886; Referee: César Soto Grado |

| 6 November 2023 12 | Getafe | 1–0 | Cádiz | Getafe |
| 21:00 CET (UTC+1) | Djené (yellow card) 13' (yellow-red card) 44'; Alderete (yellow card) 23'; Aleñá (yellow card) 58'; Suárez (yellow card) 59'; Greenwood (yellow card) 66'; Mayoral 76'; Álvarez (yellow card) 89' | Report | Alcaraz (yellow card) 45+4' | Stadium: Coliseum; Attendance: 9,853; Referee: Ricardo de Burgos Bengoetxea |

| 26 November 2023 13 | Cádiz | 0–3 | Real Madrid | Cádiz |
| 18:30 CET (UTC+1) | Alejo (yellow card) 67'; Fernández (yellow card) 70'; J. Hernández (yellow card) 71' | Report | Valverde (yellow card) 3'; Rodrygo 14', 64'; Mendy (yellow card) 32'; Bellingham 74'; Rüdiger (yellow card) 84' | Stadium: Nuevo Mirandilla; Attendance: 20,325; Referee: Guillermo Cuadra Fernández |

| 29 November 2023 14 | Mallorca | 1–1 | Cádiz | Palma |
| 21:00 CET (UTC+1) | Abdón 45+1'; Rodríguez (yellow card) 66'; Valjent (yellow card) 83' | Report | Alcaraz 12'; Roger (yellow card) 64'; Ocampo (yellow card) 80'; Mbaye (yellow card) 81' | Stadium: Estadi Mallorca Son Moix; Attendance: 13,821; Referee: Javier Iglesias Villanueva |
Note: The match was originally scheduled for 12 November 2023, but was postponed due to the absence of Mallorca forward Vedat Muriqi, who was called up to the Kosovo national team earlier than anticipated for their UEFA Euro 2024 qualifier against Israel; the qualifier date had been pushed back as a result of the Gaza war.

| 4 December 2023 15 | Celta Vigo | 1–1 | Cádiz | Vigo |
| 21:00 CET (UTC+1) | Larsen 57'; Dotor (yellow card) 90+3' | Report | Carcelén (yellow card) 12'; Ramos 16'; Sobrino (yellow card) 21'; Chust (red card) 33'; Gil (yellow card) 45+2'; Mbaye (yellow card) 59'; Alejo (yellow card) 74'; Alcaraz (yellow card) 90+3' | Stadium: Balaídos; Attendance: 17,302; Referee: Jesús Gil Manzano |

| 10 December 2023 16 | Cádiz | 1–1 | Osasuna | Cádiz |
| 18:30 CET (UTC+1) | Roger 19'; Alejo (yellow card) 68' | Report | U. García (yellow card) 9'; Budimir 70' (pen.); Cruz (yellow card) 87' | Stadium: Nuevo Mirandilla; Attendance: 18,356; Referee: Juan Martínez Munuera |

| 17 December 2023 17 | Las Palmas | 1–1 | Cádiz | Las Palmas |
| 18:30 CET (UTC+1) | Pejiño 7'; Rodríguez (yellow card) 90+4' | Report | Alejo (yellow card) 25'; Lucas Pires (yellow card) 30'; Fali (yellow card) 33'; Ramos 83' | Stadium: Estadio Gran Canaria; Attendance: 25,275; Referee: Alejandro Muñiz Ruiz |

| 21 December 2023 18 | Cádiz | 0–0 | Real Sociedad | Cádiz |
| 19:00 CET (UTC+1) | Alejo (yellow card) 32'; Fali (yellow card) 55'; Alcaraz (yellow card) 85' | Report | Remiro (yellow card) 85' | Stadium: Nuevo Mirandilla; Attendance: 17,693; Referee: Javier Iglesias Villanueva |

| 3 January 2024 19 | Granada | 2–0 | Cádiz | Granada |
| 17:00 CET (UTC+1) | Uzuni 22'; Sánchez (yellow card) 64'; Boyé (yellow card) 65'; Zaragoza 70'; Miquel (yellow card) 86' | Report | Alcaraz (yellow card) 21'; Fernández (yellow card) 42'; Ramos (yellow card) 43'; Sobrino (red card) 54'; Fali (yellow card) 90+8' | Stadium: Nuevo Los Cármenes; Attendance: 17,732; Referee: Juan Luis Pulido Santana |

| 14 January 2024 20 | Cádiz | 1–4 | Valencia | Cádiz |
| 16:15 CET (UTC+1) | Alcaraz 21' (pen.), (yellow card) 63'; L. Hernández (yellow card) 30'; Alejo (yellow card) 57'; J. Hernández (yellow card) 87' | Report | Duro 8', (yellow card) 57'; López 52'; Capoue (yellow card) 56'; Mamardashvili (yellow card) 90+1'; Guerra 90+4'; Vázquez 90+8' | Stadium: Nuevo Mirandilla; Attendance: 18,622; Referee: Isidro Díaz de Mera Escuderos |

| 19 January 2024 21 | Alavés | 1–0 | Cádiz | Vitoria-Gasteiz |
| 21:00 CET (UTC+1) | Rioja 51' (pen.) | Report | Guardiola (yellow card) 22'; Alejo (yellow card) 49'; Lucas Pires (yellow card) 50'; Fali (yellow card) 68' | Stadium: Mendizorrotza; Attendance: 15,838; Referee: Alejandro Muñiz Ruiz |

| 28 January 2024 22 | Cádiz | 0–0 | Athletic Bilbao | Cádiz |
| 16:15 CET (UTC+1) | Alcaraz (yellow card) 47'; Fali (yellow card) 73'; Alejo (yellow card) 78'; Escalante (yellow card) 89' | Report | Vesga (yellow card) 22'; Lekue (yellow card) 45' | Stadium: Nuevo Mirandilla; Attendance: 18,839; Referee: Mateo Busquets Ferrer |

| 4 February 2024 23 | Villarreal | 0–0 | Cádiz | Villarreal |
| 14:00 CET (UTC+1) | Coquelin (yellow card) 47'; Comesaña (yellow card) 67'; Baena (yellow card) 90+4' | Report | Carcelén (yellow card) 69' | Stadium: Estadio de la Cerámica; Attendance: 17,183; Referee: Pablo González Fuertes |

| 9 February 2024 24 | Cádiz | 0–2 | Real Betis | Cádiz |
| 21:00 CET (UTC+1) | Juanmi (yellow card) 52' | Report | Willian José 6'; Fornals 46'; Papastathopoulos (yellow card) 65' | Stadium: Nuevo Mirandilla; Attendance: 15,346; Referee: Ricardo de Burgos Bengoetxea |

| 17 February 2024 25 | Osasuna | 2–0 | Cádiz | Pamplona |
| 16:15 CET (UTC+1) | Mojica (yellow card) 26'; Oroz (yellow card) 42'; Budimir 63', 90+1'; Ibáñez (yellow card) 88'; D. García (yellow card) 90+5' | Report | Zaldúa (yellow card) 24'; Lucas Pires (yellow card) 31' | Stadium: El Sadar; Attendance: 19,525; Referee: Francisco José Hernández Maeso |

| 25 February 2024 26 | Cádiz | 2–2 | Celta Vigo | Cádiz |
| 14:00 CET (UTC+1) | Juanmi 66', (yellow card) 72'; Alcaraz (yellow card) 86'; Machís 90+10' | Report | Aspas 11', (yellow card) 76'; Tapia (yellow card) 33'; Manquillo (yellow card) 41'; Swedberg 58' | Stadium: Nuevo Mirandilla; Attendance: 18,123; Referee: Miguel Ángel Ortiz Arias |

| 2 March 2024 27 | Rayo Vallecano | 1–1 | Cádiz | Madrid |
| 16:15 CET (UTC+1) | Crespo (yellow card) 43'; Lejeune 78' | Report | Alejo (yellow card) 83'; J. Hernández 90+1' | Stadium: Campo de Fútbol de Vallecas; Attendance: 12,272; Referee: Javier Alberola Rojas |

| 9 March 2024 28 | Cádiz | 2–0 | Atlético Madrid | Cádiz |
| 16:15 CET (UTC+1) | Juanmi 24', 64', (yellow card) 31'; Sobrino (yellow card) 48'; Alcaraz (yellow card) 72'; Alejo (yellow card) 90' | Report | Depay (yellow card) 30'; Molina (yellow card) 52'; Morata (yellow card) 62'; Vermeeren (yellow card) 84'; Llorente (yellow card) 88' | Stadium: Nuevo Mirandilla; Attendance: 15,917; Referee: Pablo González Fuertes |

| 15 March 2024 29 | Real Sociedad | 2–0 | Cádiz | San Sebastián |
| 21:00 CET (UTC+1) | Merino 28'; Galán (yellow card) 45'; Zubimendi (yellow card) 45+2'; Zakharyan 68'; Le Normand (yellow card) 70' | Report | Ramos (yellow card) 70' | Stadium: Reale Arena; Attendance: 31,000; Referee: César Soto Grado |

| 29 March 2024 30 | Cádiz | 1–0 | Granada | Cádiz |
| 21:00 CET (UTC+1) | Navarro 51'; Chust (yellow card) 70'; Alejo (yellow card) 90+1' | Report | Sánchez (yellow card) 30'; Ruiz (yellow card) 45'; Miguel Ángel (yellow card) 70'; Corbeanu (yellow card) 72' | Stadium: Nuevo Mirandilla; Attendance: 15,422; Referee: Guillermo Cuadra Fernández |

| 13 April 2024 31 | Cádiz | 0–1 | Barcelona | Cádiz |
| 21:00 CEST (UTC+2) | Alcaraz (yellow card) 45+1'; J. Hernández (yellow card) 64'; Roger (yellow card) 85' | Report | Cubarsí (yellow card) 26'; Félix 37'; Roberto (yellow card) 45+1'; Ter Stegen (yellow card) 77' | Stadium: Nuevo Mirandilla; Attendance: 19,607; Referee: Juan Luis Pulido Santana |

| 20 April 2024 32 | Girona | 4–1 | Cádiz | Girona |
| 21:00 CEST (UTC+2) | E. García 9'; Martín 22'; Gutiérrez (yellow card) 42'; Dovbyk 71'; Portu 82' | Report | Fernández (yellow card) 31'; Chust (yellow card) 75'; Escalante 81' | Stadium: Montilivi; Attendance: 12,665; Referee: Javier Alberola Rojas |

| 28 April 2024 33 | Cádiz | 1–1 | Mallorca | Cádiz |
| 14:00 CEST (UTC+2) | Lucas Pires (yellow card) 32'; Ramos (yellow card) 41'; Mascarell 59' (o.g.); Fali (yellow card) 73' | Report | Muriqi 12'; Rodríguez (yellow card) 45+2'; Mascarell (yellow card) 53' | Stadium: Nuevo Mirandilla; Attendance: 18,174; Referee: Isidro Díaz de Mera Escuderos |

| 4 May 2024 34 | Real Madrid | 3–0 | Cádiz | Madrid |
| 16:15 CEST (UTC+2) | Brahim 51'; Bellingham 68'; Joselu 90+3' | Report | Zaldúa (yellow card) 38' | Stadium: Santiago Bernabéu; Attendance: 72,654; Referee: Javier Iglesias Villanueva |

| 12 May 2024 35 | Cádiz | 1–0 | Getafe | Cádiz |
| 14:00 CEST (UTC+2) | Alcaraz 35' (pen.); Sobrino (yellow card) 39'; Chust (yellow card) 48'; Zaldúa (yellow card) 61'; Alejo (yellow card) 90+3'; J. Hernández (yellow card) 90+4' | Report | Djené (yellow card) 34'; Óscar (yellow card) 57' | Stadium: Nuevo Mirandilla; Attendance: 16,592; Referee: Ricardo de Burgos Bengoetxea |

| 15 May 2024 36 | Sevilla | 0–1 | Cádiz | Seville |
| 19:30 CEST (UTC+2) | Ocampos (yellow card) 47'; Acuña (yellow card) 55'; Soumaré (yellow card) 62'; Navas (yellow card) 68'; Agoumé (yellow card) 76'; Salas (yellow card) 90+4' | Report | J. Hernández (yellow card) 50'; Escalante (yellow card) 70'; Guardiola 90+6' | Stadium: Ramón Sánchez Pizjuán; Attendance: 35,805; Referee: Miguel Ángel Ortiz Arias |

| 19 May 2024 37 | Cádiz | 0–0 | Las Palmas | Cádiz |
| 19:00 CEST (UTC+2) | Ramos (yellow card) 45+1'; J. Hernández (yellow card) 46'; Chust (red card) 74'; Ocampo (yellow card) 82' | Report | M. Cardona (yellow card) 83' | Stadium: Nuevo Mirandilla; Attendance: 18,950; Referee: César Soto Grado |

| 25 May 2024 38 | Almería | 6–1 | Cádiz | Almería |
| 18:30 CEST (UTC+2) | Suárez (yellow card) 21', (goal) 65', 71'; Melero 48'; Arribas 51', 86'; Zaldúa 57' (o.g.); Embarba 78' | Report | J. Hernández (yellow card) 13'; Ocampo 30'; Fali (yellow card) 78' | Stadium: Power Horse Stadium; Attendance: 7,558; Referee: Mateo Busquets Ferrer |

=== Copa del Rey ===
| 1 November 2023 First round | Badalona Futur | 0–0 (a.e.t.) (2–4 p) | Cádiz | Vic |
| 12:00 CET (UTC+1) | Segura (yellow card) 65' (yellow-red card) 108' | Report | Miranda (yellow card) 38'; Mari (yellow card) 54'; Chust (yellow card) 76'; Alcaraz (yellow card) 78' | Stadium: Estadi ZEM Hipòlit Planàs; Attendance: 3,770; Referee: Miguel Ángel Ortiz Arias |
| | Penalties |
| | Peque (penalty scored); Thior (penalty missed); Navarro (penalty scored); Xiker (penalty missed) | | (penalty scored) Gómez; (penalty scored) Navarro; (penalty scored) Kouamé; (penalty scored) Lucas Pires |

| 7 December 2023 Second round | Arandina | 2–1 | Cádiz | Aranda de Duero |
| 19:00 CET (UTC+1) | Ceesay 5'; Vitolo (yellow card) 19'; Otu (yellow card) 25'; Pesca 65'; Átomo (yellow card) 90+4' | Report | Chust (yellow card) 19'; San Emeterio 34' | Stadium: El Montecillo; Attendance: 4,100; Referee: Ignacio Alonso López |
