= 2024–25 Cádiz CF season =

Cádiz CF
2024–25 season
- Head coach: Paco López (until 8 December); Gaizka Garitano (from 8 December)
- Stadium: Nuevo Mirandilla
- Segunda División: 15th
- Copa del Rey: First round
- Top goalscorer: League: Chris Ramos (4); All: Chris Ramos (4)
- Average home league attendance: 14,361
Home colours	Away colours	Third colours

The 2024–25 season is the 115th season in the history of Cádiz CF, and the club's first season back in Segunda División. In addition to the domestic league, the team is scheduled to participate in the Copa del Rey.

== Transfers ==
=== In ===
Pos.	Player	Transferred from	Fee	Date	Source
MF	(Spain) Martín Calderón	(Spain) Atlético Sanluqueño	Loan return	30 June 2024	
DF	(Spain) Álvaro Jiménez	(Spain) CD Tenerife	Loan return	30 June 2024	
FW	(Zambia) Francisco Mwepu	(Spain) Atlético Sanluqueño	Loan return	30 June 2024	
DF	(Paraguay) Santiago Arzamendia	(Paraguay) Cerro Porteño	Loan return	30 June 2024	
MF	(Chile) Tomás Alarcón	(Spain) FC Cartagena	Loan return	30 June 2024	
DF	(Spain) Antonio Glauder	(Spain) Albacete	Free	1 July 2024	
GK	(Spain) José Joaquín Matos	(Spain) Burgos CF	Free	6 July 2024	
GK	(Spain) José Antonio Caro	(Spain) Burgos CF	Free	6 July 2024	

=== Out ===
Pos.	Player	Transferred to	Fee	Date	Source
DF	(Spain) Jorge Meré	(Mexico) Club América	Loan return	30 June 2024	
DF	(Brazil) Lucas Pires	(Brazil) Santos FC	Loan return	30 June 2024	
DF	(Spain) Javi Hernández	(Spain) Leganés	Loan return	30 June 2024	
MF	(Spain) Robert Navarro	(Spain) Real Sociedad	Loan return	30 June 2024	
FW	(Spain) Juanmi	(Spain) Real Betis	Loan return	30 June 2024	
FW	(Uruguay) Maxi Gómez	(Turkey) Trabzonspor	Loan return	30 June 2024	
DF	(Syria) Aiham Ousou	(Czech Republic) Slavia Prague	Loan return	30 June 2024	
MF	(Venezuela) Darwin Machís	(Spain) Real Valladolid	Loan return	30 June 2024	
MF	(Mali) Diadie Samassékou	(Germany) TSG Hoffenheim	Loan return	30 June 2024	
MF	(Spain) Martín Calderón	(Spain) Atlético Sanluqueño	End of contract	1 July 2024	
DF	(Senegal) Momo Mbaye	(Portugal) Vizela	End of contract	1 July 2024	
FW	(Spain) Sergi Guardiola	(Spain) Rayo Vallecano	End of contract	1 July 2024	
MF	(Mali) Youba Diarra	(Austria) TSV Hartberg	Loan	2 July 2024	
GK	(Argentina) Conan Ledesma	(Argentina) River Plate	Undisclosed	6 July 2024	
DF	(Paraguay) Santiago Arzamendia	(Argentina) Estudiantes de La Plata	€1,500,000	25 July 2024	
MF	(Spain) Iván Alejo	(Cyprus) APOEL	Loan	1 January 2025	

== Friendlies ==
=== Pre-season ===
16 July 2024 X Memorial Diego Fernández	Barbate CF	0–5	Cádiz	Benalup-Casas Viejas
19:30			2'; 41'; 83'; 85'; 90'	Stadium: Fernando Romero "Fernandín" de Benalup Stadium; Attendance: ≈ 1,000; Referee: Gonzalez Vargas

19 July 2024 Friendly	Cádiz	0–0	Blackpool
19:00

30 July 2024 Friendly	Cádiz	2–1	Al Jazira
19:30

1 August 2024 Friendly	Cádiz	0–1	Recreativo de Huelva
19:30

4 August 2024 Friendly	Cádiz	1–1	Burnley
18:30

7 August 2024 Friendly	Real Betis	0–0	Cádiz	La Línea de la Concepción
20:30 CEST (UTC+2)	Alcázar (yellow card) 21'	Report	Chust (yellow card) 36'; Almagro (yellow card) 89'	Stadium: Estadio Municipal; Referee: José Palomares Gutierrez

10 August 2024 LXX Trofeo Carranza	Cádiz	0–1	Lazio	Cádiz
		Report		Stadium: Nuevo Mirandilla

== Competitions ==
=== Overall record ===
Competition	First match	Last match	Starting round	Record							
Competition	First match	Last match	Starting round	Pld	W	D	L	GF	GA	GD	Win %
Segunda División	16 August 2024	1 June 2025	Matchday 1	7	2	3	2	9	11	−2	28.57
Copa del Rey				0	0	0	0	0	0	+0	—
Total				7	2	3	2	9	11	−2	28.57

Last updated: 29 September 2024
Source: Soccerway

=== Segunda División ===
==== League table ====
Pos	Team	Pld	W	D	L	GF	GA	GD	Pts
11	Sporting Gijón	42	14	14	14	57	54	+3	56
12	Burgos	42	15	10	17	41	48	−7	55 (Note: Burgos finished ahead of Cádiz and Córdoba on head-to-head points: Burgos 6 pts, Cádiz 5 pts, Córdoba 4 pts.)
13	Cádiz	42	14	13	15	55	53	+2	55
14	Córdoba	42	14	13	15	59	63	−4	55
15	Deportivo La Coruña	42	13	14	15	56	54	+2	53 (Note: Deportivo La Coruña finished ahead of Málaga and Castellón on head-to-head points: Deportivo La Coruña 6 pts, Málaga 5 pts, Castellón 4 pts.)

Source: LaLiga Hypermotion
Rules for classification: 1) Points; 2) Head-to-head points; 3) Head-to-head goal difference; 4) Goal difference; 5) Goals scored; 6) Fair-play points
(Note: Head-to-head record is used only after all the matches between the teams in question have been played)

==== Results summary ====
Overall								Home						Away					
Pld	W	D	L	GF	GA	GD	Pts	W	D	L	GF	GA	GD	W	D	L	GF	GA	GD
3	0	2	1	3	7	−4	2	0	1	1	2	6	−4	0	1	0	1	1	0

Last updated: 31 August 2024.

==== Results by round ====
Round	1	2	3
Ground	H	A	H
Result	L	D	D
Position			

Updated to match(es) played on 31 August 2024. Source:
A = Away; H = Home; W = Win; D = Draw; L = Loss

==== Matches ====
The match schedule was released on 26 June 2024.

16 August 2024 1	Cádiz	0–4	Zaragoza	Cádiz
21:30			Soberón 14', 43'; Aketxe 84'; Luna 90+1'	Stadium: Nuevo Mirandilla; Referee: Dámaso Arcediano Monescillo

24 August 2024 2	Levante	1–1	Cádiz	Valencia
19:00				Stadium: Estadi Ciutat de València

31 August 2024 3	Cádiz	2–2	Tenerife	Cádiz
19:00				Stadium: Nuevo Mirandilla

9 September 2024 4	Castellón	1–3	Cádiz	Castellón de la Plana
21:00				Stadium: Nou Estadi Castàlia

15 September 2024 5	Cádiz	0–0	Racing Ferrol	Cádiz
18:30				Stadium: Nuevo Mirandilla

22 September 2024 6	Cartagena	1–2	Cádiz	Cartagena
16:15	Muñoz 59'		Ramos 22', 80'	Stadium: Estadio Cartagonova

28 September 2024 7	Cádiz	1–2	Eldense	Cádiz
16:15	Ontiveros 65'		García 20'; Mateu 72' (pen.)	Stadium: Nuevo Mirandilla

12 October 2024 9	Cádiz	2–2	Málaga	Cádiz

20 October 2024 10	Cádiz	0–1	Racing Santander	Cádiz

26 October 2024 12	Cádiz	2–0	Oviedo	Cádiz

17 November 2024 15	Cádiz	2–0	Córdoba	Cádiz

30 November 2024 17	Cádiz	2–4	Deportivo La Coruña	Cádiz

14 December 2024 19	Cádiz	1–0	Albacete	Cádiz

19 December 2024 20	Cádiz	1–1	Burgos	Cádiz

12 January 2025 22	Cádiz	0–0	Levante	Cádiz

27 January 2025 24	Cádiz	3–1	Mirandés	Cádiz

9 February 2025 26	Cádiz	5–2	Cartagena	Cádiz

23 February 2025 28	Cádiz	0–0	Castellón	Cádiz

16 March 2025 31	Cádiz	1–0	Granada	Cádiz

31 March 2025 33	Cádiz	0–0	Eibar	Cádiz

12 April 2025 35	Cádiz	0–1	Elche	Cádiz

25 April 2025 37	Cádiz	v	Sporting Gijón	Cádiz
20:30

=== Copa del Rey ===
29 October 2024 First round	Jaén	0–3	Cádiz	Jaén
21:00			Sobrino 2'; Pedro Fernández 68' (o.g.); Ontiveros 69'	Stadium: Nuevo La Victoria; Referee: Saúl Ais Reig

4 December 2024 Second round	Cádiz	0–1	Eldense	Cádiz
21:00			Chapela 82' (pen.)	Stadium: Nuevo Mirandilla; Referee: Álvaro Moreno Aragón
