= 2022–23 Cádiz CF season =

Cádiz CF
2022–23 season
- Owner: Locos por el Balón SL
- President: Manuel Vizcaíno
- Head coach: Sergio
- Stadium: Nuevo Mirandilla
- La Liga: 14th
- Copa del Rey: First round
- Top goalscorer: League: Théo Bongonda; Gonzalo Escalante (4 each); All: Théo Bongonda; Gonzalo Escalante; Lucas Pérez (4 each)
- Highest home attendance: 19,833 v Real Madrid
- Lowest home attendance: 14,873 v Girona
- Average home league attendance: 17,298
- Biggest win: Cádiz 2–0 Mallorca; Cádiz 2–0 Girona; Real Betis 0–2 Cádiz; Cádiz 2–0 Valladolid
- Biggest defeat: Cádiz 0–4 Athletic Bilbao; Cádiz 0–4 Barcelona; Rayo Vallecano 5–1 Cádiz
Home colours	Away colours

The 2022–23 season was the 113th season in the existence of Cádiz CF and the club's third consecutive season in the top flight of Spanish football. In addition to the domestic league, Cádiz participated in this season's edition of the Copa del Rey.

== Players ==
=== First-team squad ===
As of 1 January 2023.

Note: Flags indicate national team as defined under FIFA eligibility rules; some limited exceptions apply. Players may hold more than one non-FIFA nationality.

No.	Pos.	Nation	Player
1	GK	ARG	Jeremías Ledesma
2	DF	ESP	Raúl Parra
3	DF	ESP	Fali
4	MF	ESP	Rubén Alcaraz
5	DF	SEN	Momo Mbaye
6	MF	ESP	José Mari (captain)
7	FW	ESP	Rubén Sobrino
8	MF	ESP	Álex Fernández (vice-captain)
9	FW	HON	Anthony Lozano
10	FW	COD	Théo Bongonda
11	FW	ESP	Iván Alejo
12	MF	MLI	Youba Diarra
13	GK	ESP	David Gil
14	DF	URU	Brian Ocampo

No.	Pos.	Nation	Player
15	FW	ESP	Roger Martí
16	FW	ESP	Chris Ramos
17	MF	ARG	Gonzalo Escalante
18	FW	ESP	Álvaro Negredo
19	FW	ESP	Sergi Guardiola
20	DF	ESP	Iza Carcelén
21	DF	PAR	Santiago Arzamendia
22	DF	URU	Alfonso Espino (3rd captain)
23	DF	ESP	Luis Hernández
24	MF	ESP	Fede San Emeterio
25	DF	ESP	Jorge Meré
32	DF	ESP	Víctor Chust
36	MF	ESP	Antonio Blanco (on loan from Real Madrid)
—	DF	ESP	Joseba Zaldúa
—	DF	ESP	Juan Cala

=== Reserve team ===
Note: Flags indicate national team as defined under FIFA eligibility rules; some limited exceptions apply. Players may hold more than one non-FIFA nationality.

No.	Pos.	Nation	Player
26	GK	BRA	Victor Aznar
28	MF	ESP	Curro Muñoz
29	FW	MLI	Mamady Diarra
30	DF	ESP	Carlos García-Die
33	MF	CMR	Etta Eyong

No.	Pos.	Nation	Player
35	DF	ESP	Kikín
37	DF	ARG	Lautaro Spatz
38	MF	ESP	Álvaro Bastida
39	MF	MLI	Moussa Diakité

=== Other players under contract ===
Note: Flags indicate national team as defined under FIFA eligibility rules; some limited exceptions apply. Players may hold more than one non-FIFA nationality.

No.	Pos.	Nation	Player
—	MF	ESP	Jon Ander Garrido

=== Out on loan ===
Note: Flags indicate national team as defined under FIFA eligibility rules; some limited exceptions apply. Players may hold more than one non-FIFA nationality.

No.	Pos.	Nation	Player
—	GK	ARG	Juan Flere (at Algeciras until 30 June 2023)
—	MF	ESP	Álvaro Jiménez (at Las Palmas until 30 June 2023)
—	MF	ESP	Martín Calderón (at Celta B until 30 June 2023)

No.	Pos.	Nation	Player
—	MF	CHI	Tomás Alarcón (at Zaragoza until 30 June 2023)
—	FW	MNE	Milutin Osmajić (at Vizela until 30 June 2023)
—	FW	ESP	Iván Chapela (at Unionistas until 30 June 2023)
—	FW	AUS	Awer Mabil (at Sparta Prague until 30 June 2023)

== Transfers ==
=== In ===
Date	Player	From	Type	Fee	Ref
1 July 2022	(Australia) Awer Mabil	(Denmark) Midtjylland	Buyout clause	Undisclosed	
6 July 2022	(Spain) Víctor Chust	Real Madrid	Transfer	Undisclosed	
11 July 2022	(Spain) Joseba Zaldúa	Real Sociedad	Transfer	Undisclosed	
18 August 2022	(Spain) Antonio Blanco	Real Madrid	Loan		
26 August 2022	(Democratic Republic of the Congo) Théo Bongonda	(Belgium) Genk	Transfer	Undisclosed	

=== Out ===
Date	Player	To	Type	Fee	Ref
1 July 2022	(Spain) Salvi	Rayo Vallecano	Transfer	Free	
4 July 2022	(Armenia) Varazdat Haroyan	(Cyprus) Anorthosis Famagusta	Transfer	Free	
10 August 2022	(Montenegro) Milutin Osmajić	(Portugal) Vizela	Loan		

== Pre-season and friendlies ==
Win Draw Loss Fixtures

15 July 2022 Friendly	Barbate	0–6	Cádiz	Benalup-Casas Viejas
19:30 CEST (UTC+2)		Report	Lozano 21'; Pombo 57'; Osmajić 60'; Álex 69'; Álvaro 70'; José Mari 85'	Stadium: Campo de Deportes Benalup; Referee: Heredia Dias

23 July 2022 Friendly	Cádiz	2–0	Málaga	San Pedro de Alcántara
19:00 CEST (UTC+2)	Hernández 12'; Lozano 41'	Report		Stadium: Marbella Football Center

26 July 2022 Friendly	Cádiz	1–1	Las Palmas	San Pedro de Alcántara
19:00 CEST (UTC+2)	Lozano 31'	Report	Jiménez 37'	Stadium: Marbella Football Center

29 July 2022 Friendly	Cádiz	0–1	Lille	San Pedro de Alcántara
19:00 CEST (UTC+2)	Mbaye (yellow card) 72'; Alarcón (yellow card) 80'	Report	Bayo 20'; André (yellow card) 64'; Fonte (yellow card) 87'	Stadium: Marbella Football Center; Attendance: 1,000; Referee: Mario Melero López (Spain)

4 August 2022 Ramón de Carranza Trophy	Cádiz	1–4	Atlético Madrid	Cádiz
21:00 CEST (UTC+2)	Cala (yellow card) 21'; Fali (yellow card) 45'; Gil (yellow card) 45'; Álvaro 87'	Report	Morata 13'; Saúl 45'; Wass 46'; Griezmann 51', (yellow card) 56'	Stadium: Nuevo Mirandilla; Referee: José Luis Munuera Montero

6 August 2022 Antonio Puerta Trophy	Sevilla	1–0	Cádiz	Seville
21:00 CEST (UTC+2)	Delaney 68'	Report	Eyong (yellow card) 11'	Stadium: Ramón Sánchez Pizjuán; Referee: Mario Melero López

30 November 2022 Friendly	Xerez	0–0	Cádiz	Jerez de la Frontera
20:30 CET (UTC+1)	García (red card) 71'	Report	Blanco (red card) 77'	Stadium: Estadio Municipal de Chapín

7 December 2022 Friendly	Cádiz	4–2	Manchester United	Cádiz
20:00 CET (UTC+1)	García 8'; Lozano 13'; Hernández (yellow card) 20'; Sobrino 57'; Alarcón 77'	Report	Martial 21' (pen.); Mainoo 48'	Stadium: Nuevo Mirandilla; Referee: Jesús Gil Manzano (Spain)

14 December 2022 Friendly	Cádiz	3–4	Wolverhampton Wanderers	La Línea de la Concepción
12:00 CET (UTC+1)	Toti 10' (o.g.); Alcaraz 57'; Fernández (yellow card) 20'	Report	Garcia 2' (o.g.); Collins 32'; Podence 38'; Fornés 76' (o.g.)	Stadium: Estadio Municipal de La Línea de la Concepción

== Competitions ==
=== Overall record ===
Competition	First match	Last match	Starting round	Final position	Record							
Competition	First match	Last match	Starting round	Final position	Pld	W	D	L	GF	GA	GD	Win %
La Liga	14 August 2022	4 June 2023	Matchday 1	14th	38	10	12	16	30	53	−23	26.32
Copa del Rey	13 November 2022		First round	First round	1	0	0	1	2	3	−1	0.00
Total					39	10	12	17	32	56	−24	25.64

Source: Soccerway

=== La Liga ===
==== League table ====
Pos	Team	Pld	W	D	L	GF	GA	GD	Pts	Qualification or relegation
12	Sevilla	38	13	10	15	47	54	−7	49 (Note: Head-to-head points: Girona 8, Rayo Vallecano 6, Sevilla 1.)	Qualification for the Champions League group stage (Note: Sevilla qualified for the 2023–24 UEFA Champions League by winning the 2022–23 UEFA Europa League.)
13	Celta Vigo	38	11	10	17	43	53	−10	43	
14	Cádiz	38	10	12	16	30	53	−23	42 (Note: Head-to-head points: Cádiz 8, Getafe 5, Valencia 3.)	
15	Getafe	38	10	12	16	34	45	−11	42	
16	Valencia	38	11	9	18	42	45	−3	42	

Source: LaLiga Santander
Rules for classification: 1) Points; 2) Head-to-head points; 3) Head-to-head goal difference; 4) Goal difference; 5) Goals scored; 6) Fair-play points (Note: Head-to-head record is used only after all the matches between the teams in question have been played)

==== Results summary ====
Overall								Home						Away					
Pld	W	D	L	GF	GA	GD	Pts	W	D	L	GF	GA	GD	W	D	L	GF	GA	GD
38	10	12	16	30	53	−23	42	7	6	6	19	23	−4	3	6	10	11	30	−19

Source: La Liga

==== Results by round ====
Round	1	2	3	4	5	6	7	8	9	10	11	12	13	14	15	16	17	18	19	20	21	22	23	24	25	26	27	28	29	30	31	32	33	34	35	36	37	38
Ground	H	A	H	A	H	A	H	H	A	H	A	H	A	A	H	A	H	A	H	A	H	A	H	A	H	A	H	A	H	A	H	H	A	A	H	A	H	A
Result	L	L	L	L	L	W	D	D	D	D	L	W	D	L	D	W	D	L	W	L	W	L	W	D	D	D	L	W	L	D	L	W	L	L	W	L	W	D
Position	16	19	20	20	20	19	19	19	19	19	19	19	19	19	19	18	18	19	18	18	16	18	16	15	16	15	15	14	16	15	17	14	15	16	16	17	13	14

Source: La Liga
A = Away; H = Home; W = Win; D = Draw; L = Loss

==== Matches ====
The league fixtures were announced on 23 June 2022.

14 August 2022 1	Cádiz	0–1	Real Sociedad	Cádiz
17:30 CEST (UTC+2)	Zaldúa (yellow card) 45'; Pérez (yellow card) 45+1'; Alejo (yellow card) 70'; Fali (yellow card) 85'	Report	Kubo 24'; Méndez (yellow card) 85'; Illarramendi (yellow card) 90+8'	Stadium: Nuevo Mirandilla; Attendance: 16,570; Referee: Isidro Díaz de Mera Escuderos

20 August 2022 2	Osasuna	2–0	Cádiz	Pamplona
17:30 CEST (UTC+2)	Ávila 37' (pen.), (yellow card) 58'; Torró (yellow card) 45+2'; Kike 79' (pen.)	Report	Alejo (yellow card) 45+4'; Alarcón (yellow card) 47' (yellow-red card) 76'; Chust (yellow card) 78'; Lozano (yellow card) 90+4'	Stadium: El Sadar; Attendance: 18,587; Referee: Antonio Mateu Lahoz

29 August 2022 3	Cádiz	0–4	Athletic Bilbao	Cádiz
20:00 CEST (UTC+2)	Espino (yellow card) 16'; Alejo (yellow card) 60'	Report	I. Williams 24', (penalty missed) 36'; Lekue (yellow card) 39'; Guruzeta 56', 90+3'; Berenguer 78'	Stadium: Nuevo Mirandilla; Attendance: 17,029; Referee: Miguel Ángel Ortiz Arias

2 September 2022 4	Celta Vigo	3–0	Cádiz	Vigo
21:00 CEST (UTC+2)	Aspas 56', 75'; Óscar 62'; Strand Larsen (yellow card) 78'	Report	Lozano (yellow card) 27'; Zaldúa (yellow card) 90+1'	Stadium: Balaídos; Attendance: 14,510; Referee: Juan Luis Pulido Santana

10 September 2022 5	Cádiz	0–4	Barcelona	Cádiz
18:30 CEST (UTC+2)	Pérez (yellow card) 56'	Report	Raphinha (yellow card) 16'; Busquets (yellow card) 53'; De Jong 55'; Lewandowski 65'; Fati 86'; Dembélé 90+2'	Stadium: Nuevo Mirandilla; Attendance: 19,530; Referee: Carlos del Cerro Grande

16 September 2022 6	Valladolid	0–1	Cádiz	Valladolid
21:00 CEST (UTC+2)	Monchu (yellow card) 18'	Report	Espino (yellow card) 28'; Emeterio (yellow card) 53'; José Mari (yellow card) 75'; Zaldúa (yellow card) 79'; Negredo 90+2'	Stadium: José Zorrilla; Attendance: 20,295; Referee: José María Sánchez Martínez

1 October 2022 7	Cádiz	0–0	Villarreal	Cádiz
14:00 CEST (UTC+2)	Alcaraz (yellow card) 36'; Alejo (yellow card) 49'; Carcelén (red card) 90+3'	Report	Rulli (yellow card) 36'; Coquelin (yellow card) 38'; Baena (yellow card) 75'	Stadium: Nuevo Mirandilla; Attendance: 15,516; Referee: Javier Iglesias Villanueva

9 October 2022 8	Cádiz	2–2	Espanyol	Cádiz
16:15 CEST (UTC+2)	San Emeterio (yellow card) 32'; Chust (yellow card) 36', (goal) 41'; Zaldúa (yellow card) 47'; Ocampo (yellow card) 69'; Pérez 78'	Report	Joselu 51', 67'; Vidal (yellow card) 68'; Gil (yellow card) 90+2'; Lozano (yellow card) 90+3'	Stadium: Nuevo Mirandilla; Attendance: 16,572; Referee: Alejandro Hernández Hernández

15 October 2022 9	Girona	1–1	Cádiz	Girona
14:00 CEST (UTC+2)	A. García (yellow card) 45+1'; Bueno (yellow card) 54'; Martínez (yellow card) 68'; Castellanos (yellow card) 69'; Stuani (yellow card) 76', (goal) 90+11'	Report	Sobrino (yellow card) 5'; Emeterio (yellow card) 23'; Fernández 46'; Alcaraz (yellow card) 62'; Espino (yellow card) 90+10'	Stadium: Estadi Montilivi; Attendance: 9,927; Referee: Ricardo de Burgos Bengoetxea

19 October 2022 10	Cádiz	0–0	Real Betis	Cádiz
19:00 CEST (UTC+2)	Alcaraz (yellow card) 67'	Report	Canales (yellow card) 90+8' (yellow-red card) 90+8'	Stadium: Nuevo Mirandilla; Attendance: 18,505; Referee: Antonio Mateu Lahoz

22 October 2022 11	Rayo Vallecano	5–1	Cádiz	Madrid
14:00 CEST (UTC+2)	Trejo (yellow card) 31'; Palazón 44' (pen.); García 45+1'; Lejeune 63', 89'; Camello 79'; Nteka (red card) 87'	Report	Sobrino (yellow card) 37'; Carcelén (red card) 42'; Alcaraz (yellow card) 52' (yellow-red card) 61'; Pérez (yellow card) 74'; Balliu 82' (o.g.)	Stadium: Campo de Fútbol de Vallecas; Attendance: 12,975; Referee: Alejandro Muñiz Ruiz

29 October 2022 12	Cádiz	3–2	Atlético Madrid	Cádiz
16:15 CEST (UTC+2)	Bongonda 1'; San Emeterio (yellow card) 65'; Fernández 81'; Chust (yellow card) 87'; Sobrino 90+9'	Report	Kondogbia (yellow card) 62'; Saúl (yellow card) 78'; Félix 85', 89', (yellow card) 90+6'; Cunha (yellow card) 90'	Stadium: Nuevo Mirandilla; Attendance: 18,183; Referee: José María Sánchez Martínez

5 November 2022 13	Getafe	0–0	Cádiz	Getafe
14:00 CET (UTC+1)	Núñez (yellow card) 8'; Duarte (yellow card) 30'; Djené (yellow card) 33'; Portu (yellow card) 74' (yellow-red card) 90+7'; Álvarez (red card) 90+6'; Iglesias (yellow card) 90+7'	Report	Hernández (yellow card) 28' (yellow-red card) 90+10'	Stadium: Coliseum Alfonso Pérez; Attendance: 10,554; Referee: Alejandro Hernández Hernández

10 November 2022 14	Real Madrid	2–1	Cádiz	Madrid
21:30 CET (UTC+1)	Militão (yellow card) 19', (goal) 40'; Vinícius (yellow card) 28'; Alaba (yellow card) 37'; Kroos 70'	Report	Fali (yellow card) 28'; Sobrino (yellow card) 44'; Alejo (yellow card) 55'; Pérez 81'	Stadium: Santiago Bernabéu; Attendance: 53,190; Referee: César Soto Grado

30 December 2022 15	Cádiz	1–1	Almería	Cádiz
19:15 CET (UTC+1)	Fali (yellow card) 24'; José Mari (yellow card) 81'; Pérez 83'	Report	Melero 40'	Stadium: Nuevo Mirandilla; Attendance: 17,345; Referee: Juan Martínez Munuera

6 January 2023 16	Valencia	0–1	Cádiz	Valencia
21:00 CET (UTC+1)	Cavani (yellow card) 34'; Kluivert (yellow card) 52'; Gayà (yellow card) 62'; Duro (yellow card) 65'; Musah (yellow card) 81'	Report	Alcaraz 9'; Sobrino (yellow card) 20'; Fali (yellow card) 34'; Ocampo (yellow card) 56'; Hernández (yellow card) 60'; Carcelén (yellow card) 65'; Alejo (yellow card) 78'	Stadium: Mestalla; Attendance: 39,703; Referee: Pablo González Fuertes

16 January 2023 17	Cádiz	1–1	Elche	Cádiz
21:00 CET (UTC+1)	Ocampo 7'; San Emeterio (yellow card) 72'; Alejo (yellow card) 90+2'; Diarra (yellow card) 90+5'	Report	González (yellow card) 43'; Palacios (yellow card) 62'; Ponce 81'	Stadium: Nuevo Mirandilla; Attendance: 17,389; Referee: Carlos del Cerro Grande

21 January 2023 18	Sevilla	1–0	Cádiz	Seville
21:00 CET (UTC+1)	Lamela (yellow card) 33'; Rakitić 89' (pen.)	Report	Espino (yellow card) 34'; Sobrino (yellow card) 45'; Alejo (yellow card) 83' (yellow-red card) 87'	Stadium: Ramón Sánchez Pizjuán; Attendance: 37,400; Referee: Alejandro Hernández Hernández

28 January 2023 19	Cádiz	2–0	Mallorca	Cádiz
14:00 CET (UTC+1)	Bongonda 10'; Fernández 38' (pen.); Alcaraz (yellow card) 50'; Carcelén (yellow card) 77'	Report	Copete (yellow card) 44'; Ndiaye (yellow card) 90+3'	Stadium: Nuevo Mirandilla; Attendance: 16,338; Referee: Ricardo de Burgos Bengoetxea

3 February 2023 20	Athletic Bilbao	4–1	Cádiz	Bilbao
21:00 CET (UTC+1)	Sancet 10', 35', 75'; Berchiche (yellow card) 30' (yellow-red card) 57'; Álvarez 44'	Report	Escalante 25'; Hernández (yellow card) 84'	Stadium: San Mamés; Attendance: 43,044; Referee: Valentín Pizarro Gómez

10 February 2023 21	Cádiz	2–0	Girona	Cádiz
21:00 CET (UTC+1)	Escalante 6', (yellow card) 55'; Hernández (yellow card) 32'; Guardiola 34'; Espino (yellow card) 38'; Lozano (yellow card) 82'	Report	Espinosa (yellow card) 17'; Roca (yellow card) 51'; Gutiérrez (yellow card) 56'; Martínez (yellow card) 70'	Stadium: Nuevo Mirandilla; Attendance: 14,873; Referee: Juan Luis Pulido Santana

19 February 2023 22	Barcelona	2–0	Cádiz	Barcelona
21:00 CET (UTC+1)	Roberto 43'; Lewandowski 45+1'; De Jong (yellow card) 66'; Kessié (yellow card) 78'	Report	Martí (yellow card) 24'; Alcaraz (yellow card) 53'; San Emeterio (yellow card) 82'	Stadium: Camp Nou; Attendance: 72,010; Referee: Pablo González Fuertes

25 February 2023 23	Cádiz	1–0	Rayo Vallecano	Cádiz
16:15 CET (UTC+1)	Alcaraz (yellow card) 55'; Espino (yellow card) 59'; Guardiola 74'; Escalante (yellow card) 90+12'	Report	De Tomás (yellow card) 51'; Catena (yellow card) 58' (yellow-red card) 90+6'; Falcao (yellow card) 90'	Stadium: Nuevo Mirandilla; Attendance: 16,703; Referee: Alejandro Muñiz Ruiz

3 March 2023 24	Real Sociedad	0–0	Cádiz	San Sebastián
21:00 CET (UTC+1)		Report	San Emeterio (yellow card) 53'	Stadium: Reale Arena; Attendance: 28,733; Referee: Antonio Mateu Lahoz

10 March 2023 25	Cádiz	2–2	Getafe	Cádiz
21:00 CET (UTC+1)	Sobrino 39', (yellow card) 90+1'; Hernández (yellow card) 60'; Jarque (yellow card) 60'; Alcaraz 82' (pen.); Ledesma (yellow card) 90+14'; Carcelén (red card) 90+16'	Report	Duarte (yellow card) 27' (yellow-red card) 80'; Alderete (yellow card) 44'; Ünal 61' (pen.), 90+16' (pen.); Munir (yellow card) 72'; Mata (yellow card) 90+11'	Stadium: Nuevo Mirandilla; Attendance: 18,414; Referee: Alejandro Hernández Hernández

18 March 2023 26	Almería	1–1	Cádiz	Almería
14:00 CET (UTC+1)	Eguaras (yellow card) 28'; Melero 90+6' (pen.)	Report	Sobrino (yellow card) 38'; Martí 49'; Guardiola (yellow card) 52'; Ramos (yellow card) 73'; Mbaye (yellow card) 90+5'	Stadium: Power Horse Stadium; Attendance: 12,183; Referee: Carlos del Cerro Grande

1 April 2023 27	Cádiz	0–2	Sevilla	Cádiz
18:30 CEST (UTC+2)	Alejo (yellow card) 42'; Sobrino (yellow card) 56'; Parra (yellow card) 62'	Report	Badé (yellow card) 28'; Ocampos 51', (yellow card) 56'; Gil (yellow card) 59'; Gueye (yellow card) 65'; En-Nesyri 74'	Stadium: Nuevo Mirandilla; Attendance: 19,181; Referee: César Soto Grado

9 April 2023 28	Real Betis	0–2	Cádiz	Seville
16:15 CEST (UTC+2)	Canales (red card) 38'; Pérez (yellow card) 44'; Carvalho (yellow card) 51'; Miranda (yellow card) 52'; Ruibal (red card) 60'	Report	San Emeterio (yellow card) 43'; Sobrino (yellow card) 45+2'; Alcaraz 53' (pen.); Ramos 59'; José Mari (yellow card) 65'	Stadium: Benito Villamarín; Attendance: 51,555; Referee: Guillermo Cuadra Fernández

15 April 2023 29	Cádiz	0–2	Real Madrid	Cádiz
21:00 CEST (UTC+2)	Alcaraz (yellow card) 29'	Report	Nacho 72'; Asensio 76'	Stadium: Nuevo Mirandilla; Attendance: 19,833; Referee: Jesús Gil Manzano

21 April 2023 30	Espanyol	0–0	Cádiz	Cornellà de Llobregat
21:00 CEST (UTC+2)	Gil (yellow card) 10'; Cabrera (yellow card) 26'; Montes (yellow card) 30'; Vidal (yellow card) 67'	Report	San Emeterio (yellow card) 39'; Carcelén (yellow card) 68'	Stadium: RCDE Stadium; Attendance: 28,512; Referee: Juan Martínez Munuera

25 April 2023 31	Cádiz	0–1	Osasuna	Cádiz
19:30 CEST (UTC+2)		Report	R. García 62'; Ezzalzouli (red card) 85'; Sánchez (yellow card) 86'	Stadium: Nuevo Mirandilla; Attendance: 18,008; Referee: Carlos del Cerro Grande

30 April 2023 32	Cádiz	2–1	Valencia	Cádiz
14:00 CEST (UTC+2)	Escalante 39'; Guardiola 46'; San Emeterio (yellow card) 60'; Sobrino (yellow card) 85'; Lozano (yellow card) 89'; Hernández (yellow card) 90+1'; Ledesma (yellow card) 90+2'; Espino (yellow card) 90+6'	Report	Lino 51'; Castillejo (yellow card) 75'; Moriba (yellow card) 85'	Stadium: Nuevo Mirandilla; Attendance: 18,650; Referee: Ricardo de Burgos Bengoetxea

3 May 2023 33	Atlético Madrid	5–1	Cádiz	Madrid
22:00 CEST (UTC+2)	Griezmann 2', 27'; Carrasco (yellow card) 21', (goal) 57' (pen.); Lemar (yellow card) 36'; Molina (yellow card) 44', (goal) 73'; Morata 49'	Report	Diarra (yellow card) 16'; Alejo (yellow card) 38'; Lozano 72'	Stadium: Cívitas Metropolitano; Attendance: 42,023; Referee: César Soto Grado

12 May 2023 34	Mallorca	1–0	Cádiz	Palma
21:00 CEST (UTC+2)	Maffeo 16', (yellow card) 90+5'; Morlanes (yellow card) 32'; Lee (yellow card) 55'; Costa (yellow card) 56'; Ruiz de Galarreta (yellow card) 58'	Report	Ramos (yellow card) 7'; Alejo (yellow card) 64'; José Mari (yellow card) 69'; Escalante (yellow card) 75'	Stadium: Visit Mallorca Stadium; Attendance: 15,377; Referee: José María Sánchez Martínez

19 May 2023 35	Cádiz	2–0	Valladolid	Cádiz
21:00 CEST (UTC+2)	Alcaraz (penalty missed) 36'; Bongonda 69', 76', (yellow card) 77'; Lozano (yellow card) 73'; San Emeterio (yellow card) 86'; Mbaye (yellow card) 90+3'	Report	El Yamiq (yellow card) 33'; Rosa (yellow card) 48'; Mesa (yellow card) 67'; J. Sánchez (yellow card) 75'; Hongla (red card) 80'	Stadium: Nuevo Mirandilla; Attendance: 18,938; Referee: Juan Martínez Munuera

24 May 2023 36	Villarreal	2–0	Cádiz	Villarreal
19:30 CEST (UTC+2)	Jackson 20', 45+2'; Moreno (yellow card) 63'	Report	San Emeterio (yellow card) 36'; Alcaraz (yellow card) 67'	Stadium: Estadio de la Cerámica; Attendance: 15,099; Referee: Juan Luis Pulido Santana

28 May 2023 37	Cádiz	1–0	Celta Vigo	Cádiz
19:00 CEST (UTC+2)	Lozano (yellow card) 10'; Sobrino (yellow card) 27', (goal) 53'; Bongonda (yellow card) 39'; Hernández (yellow card) 59'; Guardiola (yellow card) 60'; Alcaraz (yellow card) 62'; Alejo (yellow card) 77'; Escalante (yellow card) 90'; San Emeterio (yellow card) 90+5'	Report	Galán (yellow card) 16'; Núñez (yellow card) 45'; De la Torre (yellow card) 48'; Óscar (yellow card) 60'; Solari (yellow card) 63'; Aspas (yellow card) 90+5'	Stadium: Nuevo Mirandilla; Attendance: 19,725; Referee: Ricardo de Burgos Bengoetxea

4 June 2023 38	Elche	1–1	Cádiz	Elche
21:00 CEST (UTC+2)	Morente (yellow card) 9'; Boyé 71'; Gumbau (yellow card) 82'; John (yellow card) 87'; Diop (yellow card) 90+1'	Report	Escalante 10'; San Emeterio (yellow card) 18'; Carcelén (yellow card) 68'; Fali (yellow card) 87'	Stadium: Martínez Valero; Attendance: 16,585; Referee: Jesús Gil Manzano

=== Copa del Rey ===
13 November 2022 First round	Real Unión	3–2	Cádiz	Irun
18:30 CET (UTC+1)	Nacho 16', 90+3'; Pérez 79'; Chema (yellow card) 87'	Report	Pérez 15'; Blanco (yellow card) 73'; Negredo (yellow card) 44', (goal) 81'	Stadium: Stadium Gal; Referee: Miguel Ángel Ortiz Arias
