= 2022–23 CD Lugo season =

CD Lugo
2022–23 season
- President: Constantino Saqués
- Head coach: Hernán Pérez Cuesta (until 21 November); Fran Justo (from 23 November)
- Stadium: Estadio Anxo Carro
- Segunda División: 22nd (relegated)
- Copa del Rey: First round
Home colours

The 2022–23 season was the 70th season in the history of CD Lugo and their 11th consecutive season in the second division. The club participated in Segunda División and the Copa del Rey.

== Players ==
As of 26 August 2022

Note: Flags indicate national team as defined under FIFA eligibility rules; some limited exceptions apply. Players may hold more than one non-FIFA nationality.

No.	Pos.	Nation	Player
1	GK	CRC	Patrick Sequeira
4	MF	ESP	Pablo Clavería
6	MF	ESP	Juanpe Jiménez
7	MF	ESP	Sebas Moyano
8	MF	ESP	Josep Señé
9	FW	ESP	Manu Barreiro (captain)
11	MF	ESP	Ángel Baena
12	DF	BRA	Zé Ricardo
13	GK	ESP	Óscar Whalley
14	MF	ESP	Xavi Torres
15	DF	ESP	Miguel Loureiro

No.	Pos.	Nation	Player
16	FW	ESP	Chris Ramos
17	DF	COL	Neyder Lozano
18	MF	MTN	El Hacen
19	DF	UKR	Orest Lebedenko
20	DF	BRA	Bruno Pirri
21	DF	ESP	Alberto Rodríguez
22	MF	ESP	Marc Carbó
23	DF	ESP	Jordi Calavera
24	DF	ESP	Álex Pérez
26	GK	ESP	Julen Fernández
29	FW	BOL	Jaume Cuéllar

== Transfers ==
=== In ===
Date	Player	From	Type	Fee	Ref
1 July 2022	(Spain) Ángel Baena	Betis Deportivo	Transfer	Free	
4 July 2022	(Costa Rica) Patrick Sequeira	Real Unión	Transfer	Free	
5 July 2022	(Spain) Marc Carbó	San Fernando	Transfer	Free	
7 July 2022	(Brazil) Zé Ricardo	(Portugal) Feirense	Transfer	Free	
10 July 2022	(Spain) Jordi Calavera	Girona	Transfer	Free	
22 July 2022	(Colombia) Neyder Lozano	Granada	Transfer	Free	
1 August 2022	(Spain) Miguel Loureiro	Racing Ferrol	Transfer	Free	
4 August 2022	(Brazil) Bruno Pirri	Free Agent			
26 August 2022	(Mauritania) El Hacen	Free Agent			

=== Out ===
Date	Player	To	Type	Fee	Ref
1 July 2022	(Spain) Fran Vieites	Betis Deportivo	Transfer	Free	
25 July 2022	(Spain) Juan Antonio Ros	Albacete	Transfer	Undisclosed	
22 August 2022	(Spain) José Ángel Carrillo	Huesca	Transfer	Free	

== Pre-season and friendlies ==
Win Draw Loss Fixtures

30 December 2022 Friendly	Racing Ferrol	1–1 (4–5 p)	Lugo	Ferrol
19:00 CET (UTC+1)				Stadium: Estadio Municipal da Malata

== Competitions ==
=== Overall record ===
Competition	First match	Last match	Starting round	Final position	Record							
Competition	First match	Last match	Starting round	Final position	Pld	W	D	L	GF	GA	GD	Win %
Segunda División	13 August 2022	27 May 2023	Matchday 1	22nd	42	6	13	23	27	57	−30	14.29
Copa del Rey	12 November 2022		First round	First round	1	0	0	1	0	1	−1	0.00
Total					43	6	13	24	27	58	−31	13.95

Source: Soccerway

=== Segunda División ===
==== League table ====
Pos	Team	Pld	W	D	L	GF	GA	GD	Pts	Qualification or relegation
18	Villarreal B	42	13	11	18	49	55	−6	50 (Note: Overall goal difference: Sporting Gijón −5, Villarreal B −6.)	Not eligible for promotion
19	Ponferradina (R)	42	9	17	16	40	53	−13	44 (Note: Ponferradina finished ahead of Málaga on head-to-head goal difference: Málaga 1–0 Ponferradina, Ponferradina 2–0 Málaga.)	Relegation to Primera Federación
20	Málaga (R)	42	10	14	18	37	44	−7	44	Relegation to Primera Federación
21	Ibiza (R)	42	7	13	22	33	66	−33	34	Relegation to Primera Federación
22	Lugo (R)	42	6	13	23	27	57	−30	31	Relegation to Primera Federación

Source: LaLiga SmartBank
Rules for classification: 1) points; 2) head-to-head points; 3) head-to-head goal difference; 4) goal difference; 5) number of goals scored
(R) Relegated
Notes:

Notes

1. Reserve teams are not eligible for promotion to the same league as the first team.

==== Results summary ====
Overall								Home						Away					
Pld	W	D	L	GF	GA	GD	Pts	W	D	L	GF	GA	GD	W	D	L	GF	GA	GD
42	6	13	23	27	57	−30	31	3	10	8	13	19	−6	3	3	15	14	38	−24

Source: LaLiga SmartBank

==== Results by round ====
Round	1	2	3	4	5	6	7	8	9	10	11	12	13	14	15	16	17	18	19	20	21	22	23	24	25	26	27	28	29	30	31	32	33	34	35	36	37	38	39	40	41	42
Ground	H	A	H	A	H	A	H	A	A	H	A	H	H	A	H	A	H	A	H	A	H	A	A	H	A	H	A	H	A	H	A	H	A	H	H	A	H	A	H	A	H	A
Result	L	D	W	W	L	L	D	L	D	L	L	W	D	L	D	L	D	W	L	L	W	L	L	L	L	D	L	L	L	D	D	D	L	D	D	L	L	L	D	L	L	W
Position	17	16	12	9	12	17	16	18	18	20	20	19	17	18	19	20	20	19	19	20	19	20	20	21	21	21	21	21	21	22	22	22	22	22	22	22	22	22	22	22	22	22

Source: LaLiga SmartBank
A = Away; H = Home; W = Win; D = Draw; L = Loss

==== Matches ====
The league fixtures were announced on 23 June 2022.
