= Mamadou Mbaye =

Mamadou Mbaye may refer to:

- Mamadou "Jimi" Mbaye, Senegalese guitarist
- Mamadou "Momo" Mbaye (born 1998), Senegalese footballer
