= Chris Ramos =

Spanish footballer (born 1997)

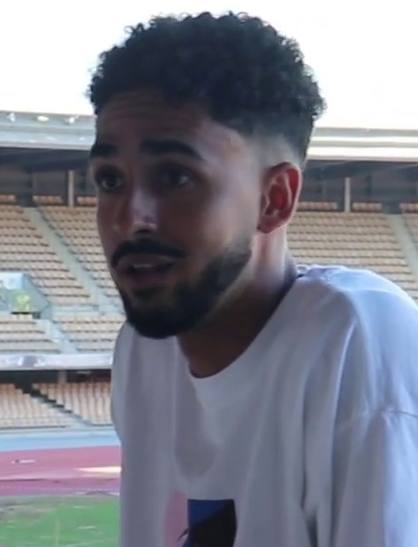

Personal information
- Full name: Christopher Ramos de la Flor
- Date of birth: 18 January 1997 (age 29)
- Place of birth: Cádiz, Spain
- Height: 1.90 m (6 ft 3 in)
- Position: Forward

Team information
- Current team: Oviedo (on loan from Botafogo)

Youth career
- Portuarios de Cádiz
- 2006–2008: Géminis San Miguel
- 2008–2009: Raúl Navas
- 2009–2011: Cádiz
- 2011–2016: Tiempo Libre

Senior career*
| Years | Team | Apps | (Gls) |
| 2016–2017 | Mercadal | 30 | (5) |
| 2017 | San Fernando B | 2 | (0) |
| 2017–2018 | San Fernando | 13 | (4) |
| 2018–2021 | Valladolid | 7 | (0) |
| 2018–2019 | → Sevilla B (loan) | 30 | (6) |
| 2019–2020 | → Badajoz (loan) | 15 | (3) |
| 2020–2021 | → Lugo (loan) | 35 | (2) |
| 2021–2023 | Lugo | 64 | (14) |
| 2023–2026 | Cádiz | 89 | (16) |
| 2025–2026 | → Botafogo (loan) | 16 | (4) |
| 2026– | Botafogo | 3 | (0) |
| 2026– | → Oviedo (loan) | 0 | (0) |
- * Club domestic league appearances and goals as of 30 May 2026

Christopher Ramos de la Flor (born 18 January 1997) is a Spanish professional footballer who plays as a forward for Real Oviedo, on loan from Botafogo.

== Career ==
Born in Cádiz, Andalusia, Ramos played youth football for GE Portuarios de Cádiz, Géminis San Miguel CF, AD Raúl Navas, Cádiz CF and AD Tiempo Libre. In 2016, after finishing his formation, he joined Tercera División side CE Mercadal.

Ramos made his senior debut on 21 August 2016, coming on as a second-half substitute in a 1–0 home loss against CF Sant Rafel. His first senior goal came on 11 September in a 3–1 loss at CD Ferriolense, and on 23 October he scored a brace in a 3–1 home win against SD Formentera.

In July 2017 Ramos moved to San Fernando CD; initially assigned to the reserves in the regional leagues, he made his first team debut on 1 October 2017 by playing the last 23 minutes in a 1–0 away win against UD Las Palmas Atlético in the Segunda División B championship.

Ramos scored his first goal for Sanfer on 22 October 2017, netting the first in a 3–2 home win against Real Murcia. He subsequently established himself as a starter for the side, scoring a double in a 4–2 away defeat of Lorca Deportiva CF on 5 November.

On 3 January 2018, Ramos signed a three-and-a-half-year deal with Segunda División side Real Valladolid. He made his professional debut ten days later, replacing goalscorer Jaime Mata in a 1–0 away win against FC Barcelona B.

Ramos contributed with six appearances for the Blanquivioletas during the campaign, achieving promotion to La Liga. He made his debut in the main category of Spanish football on 17 August 2018, starting in a 0–0 away draw against Girona FC.

On 31 August 2018, Ramos joined Sevilla Atlético on a season-long loan. On 2 September of the following year, he moved to fellow third division side CD Badajoz also in a temporary deal.

On 2 October 2020, Ramos agreed to a one-year loan deal with Segunda División side CD Lugo. He scored his first professional goal on 21 October, netting his team's third in a 3–0 home win over Girona.

On 17 August 2021, Ramos signed a permanent three-year contract with Lugo. On 31 January 2023, he signed a five-and-a-half-year contract to rejoin his hometown club Cádiz, now being assigned to the first team in the top tier.

Ramos scored his first goal in the top tier on 9 April 2023, netting his team's second in a 2–0 away win over Real Betis. In the 2023–24 season, he became the player with most aerial duels won in La Liga in 174 occasions.

On 15 August 2025, Ramos moved abroad for the first time in his career, after agreeing to a one-year loan deal with Campeonato Brasileiro Série A side Botafogo FR, with a buyout clause.

On 24 August 2025, Ramos made his debut for Botafogo and scored two goals in a 3–1 comeback victory over Esporte Clube Juventude in Caxias do Sul. Two days after his debut on the field, he was officially presented by the club at the Nilton Santos Stadium.

In July 2026, despite losing space under head coaches Martín Anselmi and Franclim Carvalho, Ramos signed a permanent deal with Fogão until December 2028, after triggering clauses of his obligatory purchase. However, he returned to Spain shortly after, after agreeing to a one-year loan deal with Real Oviedo in the second division.

== Personal life ==
Born in Spain, Ramos is of African-American descent through his father, a former expatriate basketball player. He was raised by his grandfather, who died in October 2023.

== Career statistics ==
As of 15 August 2025

Appearances and goals by club, season and competition
| Club | Season | League | | | Cup (Note: Includes Copa del Rey, Copa do Brasil) | | Continental | | Other | | Total | |
| Club | Season | Division | Apps | Goals | Apps | Goals | Apps | Goals | Apps | Goals | Apps | Goals |
|---|---|---|---|---|---|---|---|---|---|---|---|---|
| Mercadal | 2016–17 | Tercera División | 30 | 5 | — | | — | | — | | 30 | 5 |
| San Fernando B | 2017–18 | Primera Andaluza | 2 | 0 | — | | — | | — | | 2 | 0 |
| San Fernando | 2017–18 | Segunda División B | 13 | 4 | — | | — | | — | | 13 | 4 |
| Valladolid | 2017–18 | Segunda División | 6 | 0 | 0 | 0 | — | | — | | 6 | 0 |
| Valladolid | 2018–19 | La Liga | 1 | 0 | 0 | 0 | — | | — | | 1 | 0 |
| Valladolid | Total | | 7 | 0 | 0 | 0 | — | | — | | 7 | 0 |
| Sevilla Atlético (loan) | 2018–19 | Segunda División B | 30 | 6 | — | | — | | — | | 30 | 6 |
| Badajoz (loan) | 2019–20 | Segunda División B | 15 | 3 | 2 | 1 | — | | 2 (Note: Appearances in the 2020 Segunda División B play-offs) | 0 | 19 | 4 |
| Lugo (loan) | 2020–21 | Segunda División | 35 | 2 | 2 | 1 | — | | — | | 37 | 3 |
| Lugo | 2021–22 | Segunda División | 40 | 7 | 1 | 0 | — | | — | | 41 | 7 |
| Lugo | 2022–23 | Segunda División | 24 | 7 | 0 | 0 | — | | — | | 24 | 7 |
| Lugo | Total | | 64 | 14 | 1 | 0 | — | | — | | 65 | 14 |
| Cádiz | 2022–23 | La Liga | 15 | 1 | 0 | 0 | — | | — | | 15 | 1 |
| Cádiz | 2023–24 | La Liga | 37 | 5 | 1 | 0 | — | | — | | 38 | 5 |
| Cádiz | 2024–25 | Segunda División | 37 | 10 | 2 | 0 | — | | — | | 39 | 10 |
| Cádiz | Total | | 89 | 16 | 3 | 0 | — | | — | | 92 | 16 |
| Botafogo (loan) | 2025 | Série A | 1 | 2 | 0 | 0 | 0 | 0 | — | | 1 | 2 |
| Career total | | | 286 | 52 | 8 | 2 | 0 | 0 | 2 | 0 | 296 | 54 |
