= 2015–16 SD Huesca season =

SD Huesca
2015–16 season
- President: Fernando Losfablos Arnal
- Head coach: Luis Tevenet (until 29 November); Juan Antonio Anquela (from 30 November)
- Stadium: El Alcoraz
- Segunda División: 12th
- Copa del Rey: Round of 32
- Top goalscorer: League: Darwin Machís (9); All: Darwin Machís (10)
Home colours	Away colours	Third colours

The 2015–16 season was the 63rd season in the existence of SD Huesca and the club's fourth consecutive season in the second division of Spanish football. In addition to the domestic league, SD Huesca participated in this season's edition of the Copa del Rey.

== Players ==
=== First-team squad ===
As of 1 February 2016

Note: Flags indicate national team as defined under FIFA eligibility rules; some limited exceptions apply. Players may hold more than one non-FIFA nationality.

No.	Pos.	Nation	Player
1	GK	ESP	Óscar Whalley (on loan from Zaragoza)
3	DF	ESP	David Morillas
4	DF	ESP	Carlos David
5	MF	ESP	Juan Aguilera
6	MF	ESP	Iñigo Ros
7	MF	ESP	José Gaspar
8	MF	ESP	Fran Mérida
10	MF	ESP	Juanjo Camacho (Captain)
11	FW	ESP	Tyronne del Pino (on loan from Las Palmas)
12	MF	FRA	Franck-Yves Bambock
13	GK	ESP	Jorge Zaparaín
14	FW	ESP	Samuel Sáiz (on loan from Atlético Madrid)

No.	Pos.	Nation	Player
15	DF	ESP	Christian Fernández (on loan from Las Palmas)
16	DF	ESP	Jesús Valentín (on loan from Las Palmas)
17	FW	VEN	Darwin Machís (on loan from Granada)
18	DF	ESP	Nagore
19	MF	VEN	Alexander González
20	DF	ESP	Óscar Ramírez
21	DF	ESP	Íñigo López
22	FW	ESP	Héctor Figueroa (on loan from Las Palmas)
23	FW	ESP	Mikel Arruabarrena (on loan from Eibar)
24	FW	ESP	Luis Fernández (on loan from Deportivo La Coruña)
25	GK	ARG	Leo Franco

== Pre-season and friendlies ==
Win Draw Loss

7 August 2015 Friendly	Huesca (Spain)	1–1	(Spain) Zaragoza	Spain
20:00 CEST (UTC+2)

11 August 2015 Friendly	UD Logroñés (Spain)	1–1	(Spain) Huesca	Spain
19:00 CEST (UTC+2)

== Competitions ==
=== Overall record ===
Competition	First match	Last match	Starting round	Final position	Record							
Competition	First match	Last match	Starting round	Final position	Pld	W	D	L	GF	GA	GD	Win %
Segunda División	22 August 2015	4 June 2016	Matchday 1	6th	42	14	13	15	48	49	−1	33.33
Copa del Rey	10 September 2015	17 December 2015	Second round	Round of 32	3	2	0	1	5	4	+1	66.67
Total					45	16	13	16	53	53	+0	35.56

Last updated: 4 June 2016
Source: Soccerway

=== Segunda División ===
==== League table ====
Pos	Team	Pld	W	D	L	GF	GA	GD	Pts
10	Numancia	42	13	18	11	57	51	+6	57 (Note: Numancia ahead of Elche on overall goal difference; Numancia +6, Elche -6)
11	Elche	42	13	18	11	40	46	−6	57
12	Huesca	42	14	13	15	48	49	−1	55 (Note: Huesca ahead of Tenerife on goals scored; Huesca 48, Tenerife 45)
13	Tenerife	42	13	16	13	45	46	−1	55
14	Lugo	42	13	15	14	44	50	−6	54

Source: LFP
Rules for classification: 1) points; 2) head-to-head points; 3) head-to-head goal difference; 4) goal difference; 5) number of goals scored

==== Results summary ====
Overall								Home						Away					
Pld	W	D	L	GF	GA	GD	Pts	W	D	L	GF	GA	GD	W	D	L	GF	GA	GD
42	14	13	15	48	49	−1	55	7	5	9	25	25	0	7	8	6	23	24	−1

Last updated: 4 June 2016.
Source: La Liga Adelante

==== Results by round ====
Round	1	2	3	4	5	6	7	8	9	10	11	12	13	14	15	16	17	18	19	20	21	22	23	24	25	26	27	28	29	30	31	32	33	34	35	36	37	38	39	40	41	42
Ground	H	A	H	A	H	A	H	A	H	A	H	A	A	H	A	H	A	H	A	H	A	A	H	A	H	A	H	A	H	A	H	A	H	H	A	H	A	H	A	H	A	H
Result	L	D	D	D	L	W	D	W	D	D	W	L	D	L	L	L	W	D	D	L	D	L	W	D	L	D	L	W	W	L	L	L	W	L	W	W	L	W	W	D	W	W
Position	15	17	19	20	21	18	19	13	14	15	12	14	16	18	18	19	17	16	17	18	18	19	18	17	17	17	17	17	16	18	18	18	18	19	17	16	16	16	16	16	15	12

Updated to match(es) played on 4 June 2016. Source: La Liga Adelante
A = Away; H = Home; W = Win; D = Draw; L = Loss

==== Matches ====
The league fixtures were announced on 14 July 2015.

22 August 2015 1	Huesca	2–3	Alavés	Huesca
--:-- CEST (UTC+2)

29 August 2015 2	Albacete	1–1	Huesca	Albacete
--:-- CEST (UTC+2)

5 September 2015 3	Huesca	1–1	Tenerife	Huesca
--:-- CEST (UTC+2)

13 September 2015 4	Girona	0–0	Huesca	Girona
--:-- CEST (UTC+2)

20 September 2015 5	Huesca	1–3	Elche	Huesca
--:-- CEST (UTC+2)

26 September 2015 6	Mallorca	0–1	Huesca	Palma
--:-- CEST (UTC+2)

4 October 2015 7	Huesca	1–1	Valladolid	Huesca
--:-- CEST (UTC+2)

11 October 2015 8	Alcorcón	0–1	Huesca	Alcorcón
--:-- CEST (UTC+2)

18 October 2015 9	Huesca	1–1	Ponferradina	Huesca
--:-- CEST (UTC+2)

24 October 2015 10	Bilbao Athletic	0–0	Huesca	Bilbao
--:-- CEST (UTC+2)

31 October 2015 11	Huesca	2–0	Numancia	Huesca
--:-- CEST (UTC+2)

8 November 2015 12	Gimnàstic	2–0	Huesca	Tarragona
--:-- CEST (UTC+2)

15 November 2015 13	Córdoba	1–1	Huesca	Córdoba
--:-- CEST (UTC+2)

21 November 2015 14	Huesca	0–1	Oviedo	Huesca
--:-- CEST (UTC+2)

28 November 2015 15	Llagostera	2–0	Huesca	Córdoba
--:-- CEST (UTC+2)

6 December 2015 16	Huesca	1–2	Mirandés	Huesca
--:-- CEST (UTC+2)

13 December 2015 17	Almería	1–2	Huesca	Almería
--:-- CEST (UTC+2)

20 December 2015 18	Huesca	1–1	Leganés	Huesca
--:-- CEST (UTC+2)

3 January 2016 19	Zaragoza	3–3	Huesca	Zaragoza
--:-- CEST (UTC+2)				Stadium: La Romareda

10 January 2016 20	Huesca	0–1	Osasuna	Huesca
--:-- CEST (UTC+2)

17 January 2016 21	Lugo	1–1	Huesca	Lugo
--:-- CEST (UTC+2)

23 January 2016 22	Alavés	1–0	Huesca	Vitoria-Gasteiz
--:-- CEST (UTC+2)

30 January 2016 23	Huesca	3–1	Albacete	Huesca
--:-- CEST (UTC+2)

6 February 2016 24	Tenerife	1–1	Huesca	Santa Cruz de Tenerife
--:-- CEST (UTC+2)

14 February 2016 25	Huesca	0–1	Girona	Huesca
--:-- CEST (UTC+2)

21 February 2016 26	Elche	1–1	Huesca	Elche
--:-- CEST (UTC+2)

6 March 2016 28	Valladolid	0–1	Huesca	Valladolid
--:-- CEST (UTC+2)

13 March 2016 29	Huesca	1–0	Alcorcón	Huesca
--:-- CEST (UTC+2)

16 March 2016 27	Huesca	1–2	Mallorca	Huesca
--:-- CEST (UTC+2)

20 March 2016 30	Ponferradina	2–1	Huesca	Ponferrada
--:-- CEST (UTC+2)

26 March 2016 31	Huesca	1–2	Bilbao Athletic	Huesca
--:-- CEST (UTC+2)

3 April 2016 32	Numancia	3–2	Huesca	Soria
--:-- CEST (UTC+2)	Regalón 38'; Álvarez 53'; Mateu 76'		Fernández 43'; Arruabarrena 67'

10 April 2016 33	Huesca	2–0	Gimnàstic	Huesca
--:-- CEST (UTC+2)

17 April 2016 34	Huesca	0–2	Córdoba	Huesca
--:-- CEST (UTC+2)

23 April 2016 35	Oviedo	0–1	Huesca	Oviedo
--:-- CEST (UTC+2)

30 April 2016 36	Huesca	3–1	Llagostera	Huesca
--:-- CEST (UTC+2)

8 May 2016 37	Mirandés	1–0	Huesca	Miranda de Ebro
--:-- CEST (UTC+2)

15 May 2016 38	Huesca	2–1	Almería	Huesca
--:-- CEST (UTC+2)

21 May 2016 39	Leganés	2–3	Huesca	Leganés
--:-- CEST (UTC+2)

26 May 2016 40	Huesca	1–1	Zaragoza	Huesca
--:-- CEST (UTC+2)

29 May 2016 41	Osasuna	2–3	Huesca	Pamplona
--:-- CEST (UTC+2)

4 June 2016 42	Huesca	1–0	Lugo	Huesca
--:-- CEST (UTC+2)
