= Óscar Whalley =

Spanish footballer (born 1994)

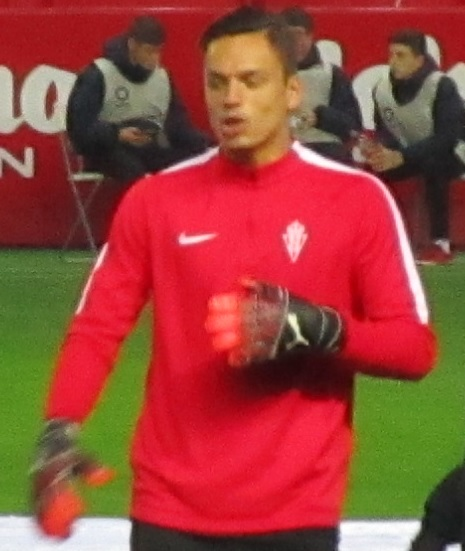
- Whalley with Sporting Gijón in 2017

Personal information
- Full name: Óscar Alexander Whalley Guardado
- Date of birth: 29 March 1994 (age 32)
- Place of birth: Zaragoza, Spain
- Height: 1.89 m (6 ft 2 in)
- Position: Goalkeeper

Team information
- Current team: Guadalajara
- Number: 13

Youth career
- Amistad
- 2006–2013: Zaragoza

Senior career*
Years	Team	Apps	(Gls)
2013–2015	Zaragoza B	26	(0)
2014–2016	Zaragoza	22	(0)
2015–2016	→ Huesca (loan)	15	(0)
2016–2018	Sporting Gijón	1	(0)
2018–2019	AGF	12	(0)
2019–2020	OFI	10	(0)
2020–2021	Castellón	24	(0)
2021–2023	Lugo	68	(0)
2023–	Guadalajara	7	(0)

International career
2014	Spain U21	1	(0)
- * Club domestic league appearances and goals as of 26 September 2026

Óscar Alexander Whalley Guardado (born 29 March 1994) is a Spanish professional footballer who plays as a goalkeeper for Liga MX club Guadalajara.

== Club career ==
Born in Zaragoza, Aragon, to an English father and a Mexican mother, Whalley spent his first season as a senior with Real Zaragoza's reserves in the Tercera División. On 31 May 2014, as first choice Leo Franco declared his desire to leave the country and understudy Pablo Alcolea was injured, he played his first match as a professional, starting in a 1–1 home draw against Sporting de Gijón in the Segunda División.

The following campaign, Whalley appeared in 19 games as Zaragoza came sixth, and a further one on 11 June 2015 as they lost their play-off semi-final first leg 3–0 at home to Girona. He was subsequently dropped for Bono for the rest of the tournament, as the team won the tie on away goals and lost the final by the same rule to Las Palmas.

On 10 July 2015, Whalley was loaned to neighbouring Huesca also in the second tier. On 8 August of the following year he signed with La Liga club Sporting Gijón, as third choice behind Iván Cuéllar and Diego Mariño.

Whalley moved abroad for the first time in his career on 12 June 2018, joining Danish Superliga side Aarhus Gymnastikforening. In August 2019, he left for OFI Crete F.C. of the Super League Greece.

Whalley returned to Spain and its second division on 3 September 2020, after agreeing to a two-year contract with newly-promoted club Castellón. On 25 July 2021, after suffering relegation, he joined Lugo in the same league.

On 12 June 2023, Whalley signed for Guadalajara of the Mexican Liga MX. He initially played second-fiddle to Raúl Rangel, but became a starter during the Clausura 2026 play-offs.

== International career ==
Whalley won his only cap for Spain at under-21 level on 12 November 2014, playing the second half of the 4–1 friendly loss to Belgium in Ferrol. He stated he would willingly accept a call up to the England national team if asked, as he is eligible through his father, and previously mentioned he preferred to represent them internationally; he is likewise eligible for Mexico through his mother.

== Career statistics ==
As of match played on 26 September 2026

Appearances and goals by club, season and competition
Club	Season	League			Cup		Continental		Other		Total	
Club	Season	Division	Apps	Goals	Apps	Goals	Apps	Goals	Apps	Goals	Apps	Goals
Zaragoza	2013–14	Segunda División	2	0	—		—		—		2	0
Zaragoza	2014–15	Segunda División	20	0	—		—		—		20	0
Zaragoza	Total		22	0	—		—		—		22	0
Huesca (loan)	2015–16	Segunda División	15	0	2	0	—		—		17	0
Sporting Gijón	2017–18	Segunda División	1	0	1	0	—		—		2	0
AGF	2018–19	Danish Superliga	10	0	2	0	—		—		12	0
AGF	2019–20	Danish Superliga	2	0	—		—		—		2	0
AGF	Total		12	0	2	0	—		—		14	0
OFI	2019–20	Super League Greece	10	0	4	0	—		—		14	0
Castellón	2020–21	Segunda División	24	0	2	0	—		—		26	0
Lugo	2021–22	Segunda División	30	0	1	0	—		—		31	0
Lugo	2022–23	Segunda División	38	0	—		—		—		38	0
Lugo	Total		68	0	1	0	—		—		69	0
Guadalajara	2023–24	Liga MX	—		—		4 (Note: Appearances in CONCACAF Champions Cup)	0	—		4	0
Guadalajara	2025–26	Liga MX	6	0	—		—		—		6	0
Guadalajara	2026–27	Liga MX	1	0	—		—		1 (Note: Appearances in Leagues Cup)	0	2	0
Guadalajara	Total		7	0	—		4	0	1	0	12	0
Career total			159	0	12	0	4	0	1	0	176	0
