= Brian Ocampo =

Uruguayan footballer (born 1999)

Personal information
- Full name: Brian Alexis Ocampo Ferreira
- Date of birth: 25 June 1999 (age 27)
- Place of birth: Florida, Uruguay
- Height: 1.72 m (5 ft 8 in)
- Position: Winger

Team information
- Current team: Coritiba
- Number: 17

Youth career
- Nacional

Senior career*
Years	Team	Apps	(Gls)
2018–2022	Nacional	92	(8)
2022–2026	Cádiz	95	(8)
2026–	Coritiba	1	(0)

International career^{‡}
2017	Uruguay U18	8	(2)
2018–2019	Uruguay U20	7	(1)
2021	Uruguay	1	(0)
Medal record
Men's football
Representing Uruguay
Copa América
Third place	2024 United States
South American Games
Silver medal – second place	2018 Cochabamba	Team
- * Club domestic league appearances and goals as of 22 July 2026 ‡ National team caps and goals as of 19 June 2021

Brian Alexis Ocampo Ferreira (born 25 June 1999) is a Uruguayan professional footballer who plays as a forward for Coritiba.

== Club career ==
=== Nacional Montevideo ===
A youth academy graduate of Nacional, Ocampo was part of club's under-20 team which won 2018 U-20 Copa Libertadores. He made his professional debut on 19 July 2018 in a goalless draw against Sol de América in second stage of Copa Sudamericana. Four days later on 23 July, he made his league debut in a 3–2 win against Montevideo City Torque.

=== Cádiz ===
On 28 August 2022, Spanish La Liga side Cádiz reached an agreement with Nacional for the transfer of Ocampo. He scored his first competitive goal for the club on 16 January 2023, scoring the opener in a 1–1 draw with Elche. In March 2023, Ocampo suffered an ACL injury in a training session, sidelining him through November 2023. He made his return on 26 November 2023 in a 3–0 defeat to Real Madrid.

== International career ==
Ocampo is a former Uruguayan youth international. On 1 June 2021, he received first call-up to senior team as a replacement for Giorgian de Arrascaeta in their 2021 Copa América squad. He made his debut on 18 June 2021 in a 1–0 loss against Argentina. On 21 October 2022, he was named in Uruguay's 55-man preliminary squad for the 2022 FIFA World Cup.

== Career statistics ==
=== Club ===
As of match played 25 May 2024

Appearances and goals by club, season and competition
Club	Season	League			Cup		Continental		Other		Total	
Club	Season	Division	Apps	Goals	Apps	Goals	Apps	Goals	Apps	Goals	Apps	Goals
Nacional	2018	Uruguayan Primera División	9	0	—		2 (Note: Appearances in Copa Sudamericana.)	0	0	0	11	0
Nacional	2019	Uruguayan Primera División	20	3	—		1 (Note: Appearance(s) in Copa Libertadores.)	0	0	0	21	3
Nacional	2020	Uruguayan Primera División	25	1	—		5	0	4 (Note: Two appearances in championship play-offs, one appearance each in Supercopa Uruguaya and Torneo Intermedio final.)	0	34	1
Nacional	2021	Uruguayan Primera División	23	2	—		8 (Note: Six appearances and two goals in Copa Libertadores, two appearances in Copa Sudamericana.)	2	1 (Note: Appearance in Supercopa Uruguaya.)	0	32	4
Nacional	2022	Uruguayan Primera División	15	2	0	0	6 (Note: Four appearances in Copa Libertadores and two appearances in Copa Sudamericana.)	0	1 (Note: Appearance in Torneo Intermedio final.)	0	22	2
Nacional	Total		92	8	0	0	22	2	6	0	120	10
Cádiz	2022–23	La Liga	18	1	1 (Note: Appearance(s) in Copa del Rey.)	0	—		—		19	1
Cádiz	2023–24	La Liga	13	1	1	0	—		—		14	1
Cádiz	Total		31	2	2	0	0	0	0	0	33	2
Career total			123	10	2	0	22	2	6	0	153	12

=== International ===
As of match played 18 June 2021

Appearances and goals by national team and year
National team	Year	Apps	Goals
Uruguay	2021	1	0
Uruguay	2022	0	0
Uruguay	2024	0	0
Total		1	0

== Honours ==
Nacional U20

- U-20 Copa Libertadores: 2018

Nacional

- Uruguayan Primera División: 2019, 2020, 2022
- Supercopa Uruguaya: 2021

Uruguay U20

- South American Games silver medal: 2018

Uruguay

- Copa América third place: 2024
