= Bruno Pirri =

Brazilian footballer (born 1992)

Personal information
- Full name: Bruno Batista Pereira Pires
- Date of birth: 12 May 1992 (age 34)
- Place of birth: Osvaldo Cruz, Brazil
- Height: 1.84 m (6 ft 0 in)
- Position: Centre back

Youth career
- 2010–2012: Atlético Paranaense

Senior career*
Years	Team	Apps	(Gls)
2012	Atlético Paranaense	0	(0)
2013	União Barbarense	12	(0)
2013	Figueirense	14	(0)
2014–2017	Chiapas	55	(3)
2016	→ Tapachula (loan)	12	(0)
2018	Ceará	8	(0)
2019–2020	Vitória Setúbal	21	(3)
2020–2021	Kunshan FC	24	(2)
2022–2023	Lugo	8	(0)
- * Club domestic league appearances and goals as of 29 March 2023

Bruno Batista Pereira Pires (born 12 May 1992), known as Bruno Pirri, is a Brazilian professional footballer who plays as a central defender.

== Club career ==
On 6 September 2020, Pires joined China League One side Kunshan. On 4 August 2022, he moved to Spanish club CD Lugo in Segunda División, on a one-year deal.

== Career statistics ==
=== Club ===
As of match played 29 March 2023

Appearances and goals by club, season and competition
Club	Season	League			State league		National cup		League cup		Other		Total	
Club	Season	Division	Apps	Goals	Apps	Goals	Apps	Goals	Apps	Goals	Apps	Goals	Apps	Goals
União Barbarense	2013	Paulista	—		12	0	—		—		—		12	0
Figueirense	2013	Série B	14	0	—		2	0	—		—		16	0
Chiapas	2013–14	Liga MX	10	0	—		1	1	—		—		11	1
Chiapas	2014–15	Liga MX	22	3	—		4	0	—		—		26	3
Chiapas	2016–17	Liga MX	22	0	—		5	0	—		—		27	0
Chiapas	Total		54	3	—		10	1	—		—		64	3
Tapachula (loan)	2015–16	Ascenso MX	12	0	—		2	0	—		—		14	0
Ceará	2018	Série A	0	0	8	0	—		—		0	0	8	0
Vitória Setúbal	2019–20	Primeira Liga	21	3	—		1	0	2	0	—		24	3
Kunshan FC	2020	China League One	14	2	—		1	0	—		—		15	2
Kunshan FC	2021	China League One	10	0	—		0	0	—		—		10	0
Kunshan FC	Total		24	2	—		1	0	—		—		25	2
Lugo	2022–23	Segunda División	8	0	—		0	0	—		—		8	0
Career total			133	8	10	0	14	1	2	0	0	0	161	9
