= Lucas Pires (footballer) =

Brazilian footballer (born 2001)

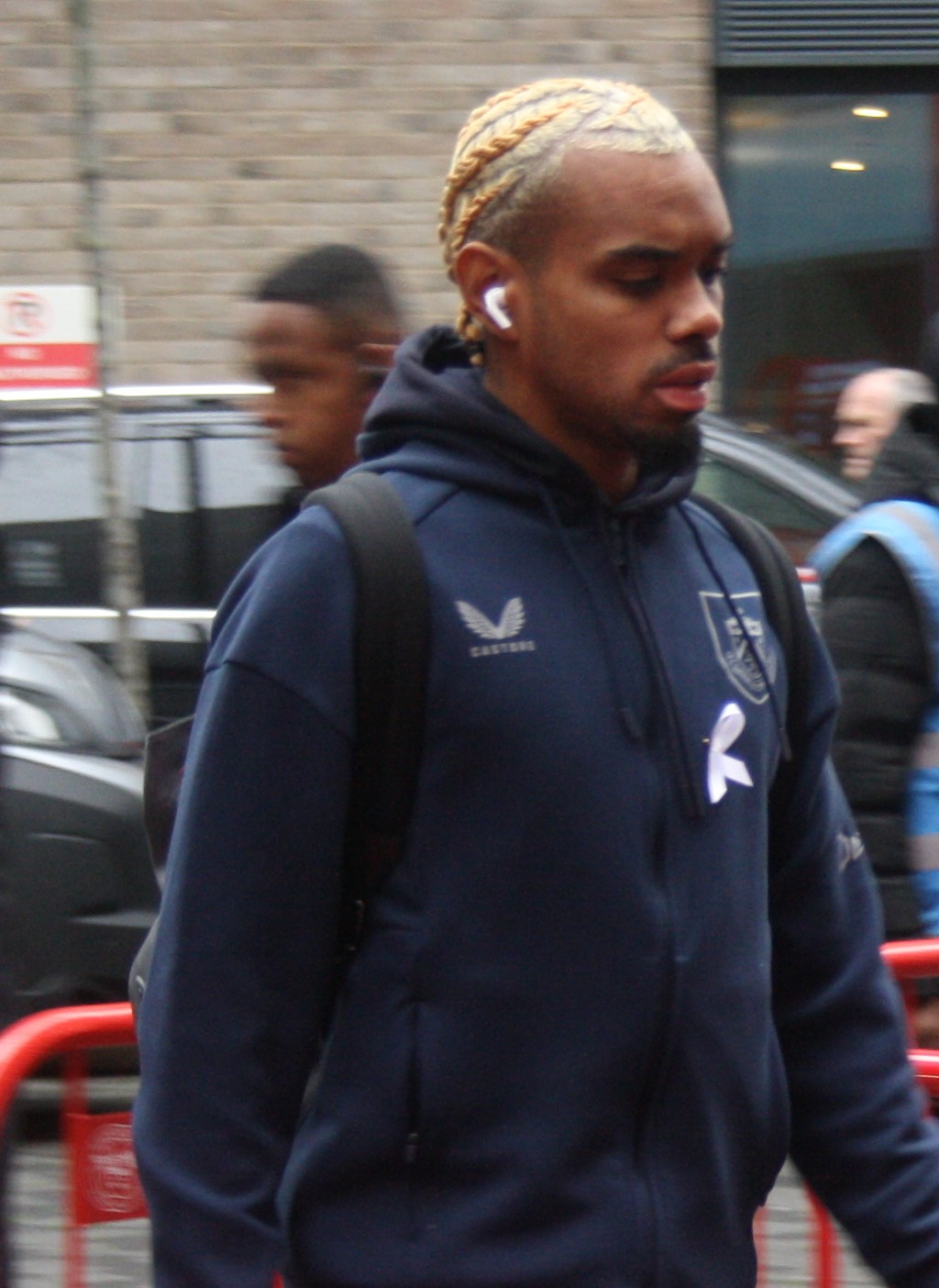
- Lucas Pires with Burnley in 2025

Personal information
- Full name: Lucas Pires Silva
- Date of birth: 24 March 2001 (age 25)
- Place of birth: São Paulo, Brazil
- Height: 1.87 m (6 ft 2 in)
- Position: Left-back

Team information
- Current team: Burnley
- Number: 23

Youth career
- 2009–2021: Corinthians
- 2021–2022: Santos

Senior career*
Years	Team	Apps	(Gls)
2022–2024	Santos	49	(0)
2023–2024	→ Cádiz (loan)	28	(1)
2024–	Burnley	66	(0)
- * Club domestic league appearances and goals as of 09:38, 8 November 2026 (UTC)

Lucas Pires Silva (born 24 March 2001) is a Brazilian professional footballer who plays as a left-back for EFL Championship club Burnley.

== Career ==
=== Early career ===
Born and raised in Jabaquara, a district of São Paulo, Lucas Pires started his career with the futsal team of Nacional-SP at the age of just six. He then moved to the futsal team of Santos at the age of eight, and later joined Corinthians' youth setup, where he spent 13 years.

On 17 July 2017, Lucas Pires signed his first professional contract with Corinthians. He represented the under-17, under-20 and under-23 squads at the club, but failed to make a breakthrough in the first team. On 10 July 2021, after failing to agree new terms, he terminated his contract, which was due to expire in September.

=== Santos ===
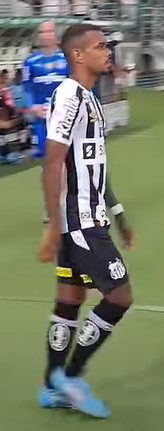
Lucas Pires with Santos in 2022

On 20 July 2021, Lucas Pires signed a three-year deal with Santos, being initially assigned to the under-23s. The following 31 January, after impressing in the 2022 Copa São Paulo de Futebol Júnior, he was definitely promoted to the first team.

Lucas Pires made his professional debut on 2 February 2022, coming on as a second-half substitute for Felipe Jonatan in a 2–1 Campeonato Paulista away win over former side Corinthians. He made his Série A debut on 9 April, playing the full 90 minutes in a 0–0 away draw against Fluminense.

On 31 May 2022, after establishing himself as a starter, Lucas Pires renewed his contract until May 2026. On 27 June 2023, he was fined 50% of his wages and separated from the first team squad due to disciplinary reasons, being also transfer-listed by the club.

==== Loan to Cádiz ====
On 25 July 2023, Pires joined La Liga side Cádiz on loan for the 2023–24 season. He made his debut abroad on 14 August, replacing Javi Hernández in a 1–0 home win over Alavés.

Pires scored his first professional goal on 1 October 2023, netting the opener in a 3–2 away loss to Atlético Madrid.

=== Burnley ===
On 3 July 2024, Pires was transferred to EFL Championship side Burnley in a deal worth £1.9m. This move marks one of Burnley's first signings since being relegated from the Premier League, following the 2023–24 season. He made his debut for the club at their opening game of the season against Luton Town, registering 2 assists.

== Career statistics ==
As of match played 7 November 2026

Appearances and goals by club, season and competition
Club	Season	League			State league (Note: Includes Campeonato Paulista)		National cup (Note: Includes Copa do Brasil, Copa del Rey, FA Cup)		League cup (Note: Includes EFL Cup)		Continental		Other		Total	
Club	Season	Division	Apps	Goals	Apps	Goals	Apps	Goals	Apps	Goals	Apps	Goals	Apps	Goals	Apps	Goals
Santos	2021	Série A	0	0	0	0	0	0	—		0	0	5 (Note: Appearance(s) in Copa Paulista)	0	5	0
Santos	2022	Série A	20	0	10	0	5	0	—		7 (Note: Appearance(s) in Copa Sudamericana)	0	—		42	0
Santos	2023	Série A	9	0	10	0	4	0	—		4	0	—		27	0
Santos	Total		29	0	20	0	9	0	—		11	0	5	0	74	0
Cádiz (loan)	2023–24	La Liga	28	1	—		2	0	—		—		—		30	1
Burnley	2024–25	Championship	34	0	—		3	0	1	0	—		—		38	0
Burnley	2025–26	Premier League	20	0	—		1	0	2	0	—		—		23	0
Burnley	2026–27	Championship	12	0	—		0	0	1	0	—		—		13	0
Burnley	Total		66	0	—		4	0	4	0	—		—		74	0
Career total			123	1	20	0	15	0	4	0	11	0	5	0	178	1
