= Zé Ricardo (footballer, born 1998) =

Brazilian footballer

Personal information
- Full name: José Ricardo Avelar Ribeiro
- Date of birth: 4 September 1998 (age 28)
- Place of birth: Goiânia, Brazil
- Height: 1.75 m (5 ft 9 in)
- Position: Left-back

Team information
- Current team: Tondela
- Number: 12

Youth career
- 2010–2017: Rayo Vallecano

Senior career*
Years	Team	Apps	(Gls)
2017–2019	Desportivo das Aves	0	(0)
2017–2019	→ Mirandela (loan)	38	(3)
2019–2022	Feirense	65	(1)
2022–2023	Lugo	30	(0)
2023–2025	AVS	19	(1)
2025–2026	Feirense	41	(2)
2026–	Tondela	6	(0)
- * Club domestic league appearances and goals as of 12 September 2026

José Ricardo Avelar Ribeiro (born 4 September 1998), commonly known as Zé Ricardo, is a Brazilian professional footballer who plays as a left-back for Liga Portugal 2 club Tondela.

== Club career ==
A Rayo Vallecano youth graduate, Zé Ricardo made his senior debut with Portuguese side SC Mirandela in the Campeonato de Portugal. In 2019, he moved to Liga Portugal 2 side Feirense.

On 7 July 2022, Zé Ricardo returned to Spain after signing a two-year deal with Segunda División side CD Lugo.

On 7 August 2023, Zé Ricardo returned to Portugal, signing a two-year contract with Liga Portugal 2 club AVS Futebol SAD.

== Career statistics ==
=== Club ===
As of match played 26 September 2023

Appearances and goals by club, season and competition
Club	Season	League			National cup		League cup		Total	
Club	Season	Division	Apps	Goals	Apps	Goals	Apps	Goals	Apps	Goals
Aves	2017–18	Primeira Liga	0	0	0	0	0	0	0	0
Mirandela (loan)	2017–18	Campeonato de Portugal	8	0	0	0	—		8	0
Mirandela (loan)	2018–19	Campeonato de Portugal	30	3	3	0	—		33	3
Mirandela (loan)	Total		38	3	3	0	—		41	3
Feirense	2019–20	LigaPro	9	0	2	0	0	0	11	0
Feirense	2020–21	Liga Portugal 2	28	0	1	0	—		29	0
Feirense	2021–22	Liga Portugal 2	28	1	1	0	1	0	30	1
Feirense	Total		65	1	4	0	1	0	70	1
Lugo	2022–23	Segunda División	30	0	1	0	—		31	0
AVS	2023–24	Liga Portugal 2	3	0	1	0	1	0	5	0
Career total			136	4	9	0	2	0	147	4
