= Carlos García-Die =

Spanish footballer

Personal information
- Full name: Carlos García-Die Sánchez
- Date of birth: 7 July 2000 (age 26)
- Place of birth: Barcelona, Spain
- Height: 1.88 m (6 ft 2 in)
- Position: Centre-back

Youth career
- 2013–2017: Espanyol
- 2017–2018: Damm
- 2018–2019: Espanyol

Senior career*
Years	Team	Apps	(Gls)
2019–2022	Cornellà	23	(1)
2019–2020	→ Terrassa (loan)	20	(1)
2022–2023	Cádiz B	30	(0)
2022–2024	Cádiz	1	(0)
2023–2024	→ Córdoba (loan)	18	(1)
2024–2025	Unionistas	18	(1)
2025–2026	Sabadell	24	(0)
- * Club domestic league appearances and goals as of 25 May 2026

Carlos García-Die Sánchez (born 7 July 2000) is a Spanish professional footballer who plays as a centre-back.

== Professional career ==
Born in Barcelona, Catalonia, García-Die is a youth product of RCD Espanyol and CF Damm. He moved to UE Cornellà in 2019, and began his senior career on loan with the Tercera División side Terrassa FC for the 2019–20 season.

García-Die returned to Cornellà for the 2020–21 campaign, and broke into the starting eleven during the 2021–22 Primera División RFEF. He transferred to La Liga side Cádiz CF on 4 July 2022, being initially assigned to the reserves in Segunda Federación.

García-Die made his professional – and La Liga – debut with Cádiz on 30 December 2022, coming on as a second-half substitute for Fali and assisting Lucas Pérez's equalizer in a 1–1 home draw with UD Almería. On 25 August of the following year, he was loaned to Córdoba CF for one year.

On 20 July 2024, García-Die signed with Unionistas de Salamanca CF in Primera Federación. He moved to fellow league team CE Sabadell FC on 9 July of the following year, and featured in 25 matches overall during the season as the club achieved promotion to Segunda División.
