= Tomás Alarcón =

Chilean footballer (born 1999)

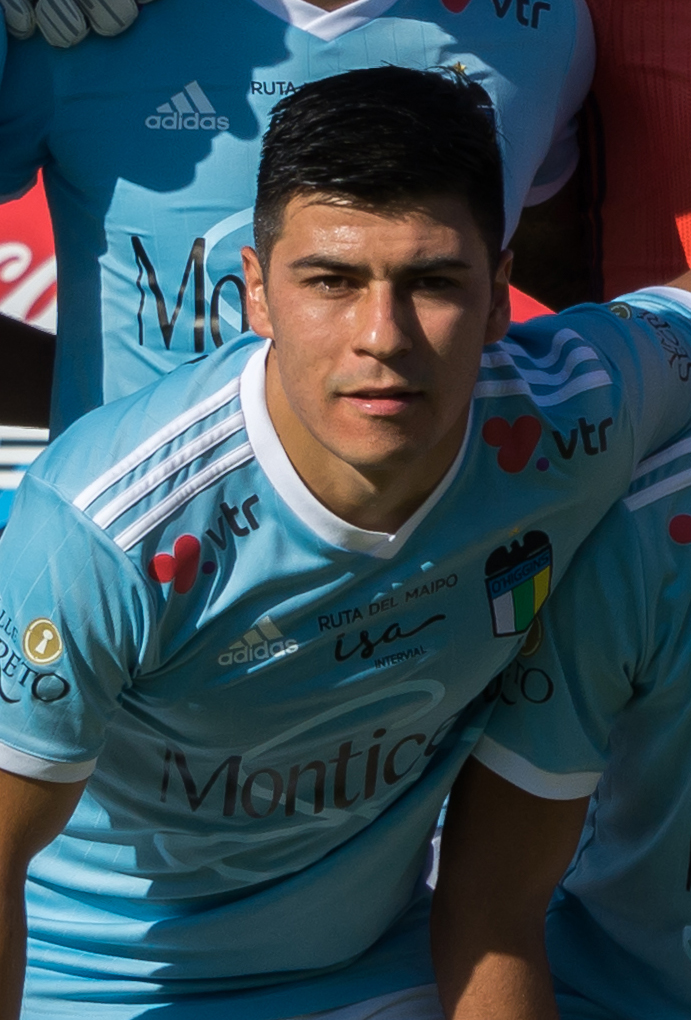

Personal information
- Full name: Tomás Jesús Alarcón Vergara
- Date of birth: 19 January 1999 (age 27)
- Place of birth: Rancagua, Chile
- Height: 1.75 m (5 ft 9 in)
- Position: Defensive midfielder

Team information
- Current team: Colo-Colo

Youth career
- O'Higgins

Senior career*
Years	Team	Apps	(Gls)
2016–2021	O'Higgins	85	(8)
2021–2025	Cádiz	30	(0)
2023	→ Zaragoza (loan)	12	(0)
2023–2024	→ Cartagena (loan)	35	(1)
2025–	Colo-Colo	0	(0)

International career^{‡}
2018–2019	Chile U20	9	(3)
2019–2020	Chile U23	8	(0)
2019–	Chile	12	(0)
Medal record
Men's football
Representing Chile
South American Games
Gold medal – first place	2018 Cochabamba
- * Club domestic league appearances and goals as of 21 November 2024 ‡ National team caps and goals as of 19:05, 14 June 2022 (UTC)

Tomás Jesús Alarcón Vergara (born 19 January 1999) is a Chilean professional footballer who plays for Colo-Colo and the Chile national team. Mainly a defensive midfielder, he can also play as a central defender.

== Club career ==
=== O'Higgins ===
Born in Rancagua, Alarcón began his career with hometown side O'Higgins. He made his first team debut at the age of just 17 on 13 August 2016, starting in a 1–1 away draw against Deportes Iquique.

Alarcón started to establish himself as a starter for the club midway through the 2018 campaign, where he was also utilised as a central defender by manager Gabriel Milito. He scored his first senior goal on 13 September 2020, but in a 2–1 home loss against Everton de Viña del Mar. On 8 December, he scored a brace in a 2–1 home success over Huachipato. Alarcón finished the 2020 season with seven goals scored in 28 games.

=== Cádiz ===
On 13 June 2021, Alarcón signed a four-year contract with La Liga club Cádiz CF, which spent $2 million for the 80% of his pass. On 14 August, he made his official debut with Cádiz on the first match of 2021–22 La Liga, playing from the start in the 1–1 draw against Levante and sending a key cross for the equalizer at the end of his debut match.

On 27 December 2022, after being rarely used during the campaign, Alarcón was loaned to Segunda División side Real Zaragoza until June. On 23 August 2023, he moved to fellow second division side FC Cartagena on loan for the 2023–24 season.

Back to Cádiz in July 2024, Alarcón again featured rarely before moving to Colo-Colo back in his home country on 22 January 2025.

== International career ==
At under-20 level, Alarcón represented Chile in both the 2018 South American Games, winning the gold medal, and the 2019 South American Championship

He also represented Chile U23 at the 2020 CONMEBOL Pre-Olympic Tournament and was in the Chile U23 squad for the 2019 Toulon Tournament.

Alarcón made his debut for Chile senior team on 5 September 2019 in a friendly match against Argentina, as a 55th-minute substitute for Claudio Baeza. He was considered by Martín Lasarte to play in the 2022 FIFA World Cup qualification, having his first official international presentation against Argentina on 3 June 2021. In the same month, Alarcón was nominated to participate in the 2021 Copa América, playing in four games of the tournament, in which Chile lost at the quarter-finals against Brazil.

== Career statistics ==
=== Club ===
As of match played 10 December 2023

Appearances and goals by club, season and competition
Club	Season	League			Cup		Continental		Other		Total	
Club	Season	Division	Apps	Goals	Apps	Goals	Apps	Goals	Apps	Goals	Apps	Goals
O'Higgins	2016–17	Chilean Primera División	1	0	–		–		–		1	0
O'Higgins	2017	Chilean Primera División	4	0	2	0	–		–		6	0
O'Higgins	2018	Chilean Primera División	24	0	2	0	–		–		26	0
O'Higgins	2019	Chilean Primera División	22	0	1	0	–		–		23	0
O'Higgins	2020	Chilean Primera División	28	0	0	0	–		–		28	0
O'Higgins	2021	Chilean Primera División	7	0	0	0	–		–		7	0
O'Higgins	Total		86	0	5	0	0	0	0	0	91	0
Cádiz	2021–22	La Liga	23	0	1	0	–		–		24	0
Cádiz	2022–23	La Liga	4	0	1	0	–		–		5	0
Cádiz	Total		27	0	2	0	–		–		29	0
Real Zaragoza (loan)	2022–23	Segunda División	12	0	0	0	–		–		12	0
Cartagena (loan)	2023–24	Segunda División	14	0	1	0	–		–		15	0
Career total			139	0	8	0	0	0	0	0	147	0

=== International ===
As of match played 14 June 2022

Appearances and goals by national team and year
National team	Year	Apps	Goals
Chile	2019	1	0
Chile	2021	8	0
Chile	2022	3	0
Total		12	0

== Honours ==
Chile U20

- South American Games Gold medal: 2018
