= Álvaro Bastida =

Spanish footballer (born 2004)

Personal information
- Full name: Álvaro Bastida Moya
- Date of birth: 12 May 2004 (age 22)
- Place of birth: Chiclana, Spain
- Height: 1.70 m (5 ft 7 in)
- Position: Midfielder

Team information
- Current team: Arenteiro
- Number: 25

Youth career
- Sancti Petri
- Cádiz

Senior career*
Years	Team	Apps	(Gls)
2021–2025	Cádiz B	79	(6)
2021–2025	Cádiz	7	(0)
2023–2024	→ Sanluqueño (loan)	19	(0)
2025–	Arenteiro	33	(4)

International career^{‡}
2021–2022	Spain U18	9	(1)
2021	Spain U19	3	(0)
- * Club domestic league appearances and goals as of 10 June 2026 ‡ National team caps and goals as of 30 June 2022

Álvaro Bastida Moya (born 12 May 2004) is a Spanish footballer who plays as a midfielder for Primera Federación club Arenteiro.

== Club career ==
Born in Chiclana de la Frontera, Cádiz, Andalusia, Bastida joined Cádiz CF's youth setup at early age, from APA Sancti Petri. On 25 April 2021, aged just 16, he made his senior debut with the reserves by coming on as a second-half substitute in a 2–1 Segunda División B away win over Sevilla Atlético.

Bastida made his first team – and La Liga – debut on 21 May 2021, replacing Jens Jønsson in a 2–2 away draw against Levante UD; aged 17 years and nine days, he became the youngest player to feature in the top tier for the club. He continued to alternate between the B-team and the main squad in the following years, before moving out on loan to Primera Federación side Atlético Sanluqueño CF on 29 August 2023.

== International career ==
On 24 August 2021, Bastida was called up to the Spain under-18 team for a friendly tournament in France.
