= Momo Mbaye =

Senegalese footballer

Personal information
- Full name: Mamadou Mbaye
- Date of birth: 28 June 1998 (age 28)
- Place of birth: Saint-Louis, Senegal
- Height: 1.92 m (6 ft 4 in)
- Position: Centre back

Team information
- Current team: Puerto Cabello
- Number: 15

Youth career
- Dakar Sacré-Cœur

Senior career*
Years	Team	Apps	(Gls)
2017–2018	Sud América	0	(0)
2017–2018	→ Cádiz B (loan)	20	(2)
2019	Inter Zaprešić	0	(0)
2019–2022	Cádiz B	31	(4)
2021–2024	Cádiz	18	(0)
2024–	Vizela	2	(0)
2025	→ Puerto Cabello (loan)	9	(0)

International career
2017	Senegal U20	8	(0)
- * Club domestic league appearances and goals as of 8 May 2025

Mamadou "Momo" Mbaye (born 28 June 1998) is a Senegalese professional footballer who plays as a central defender for Venezuelan Primera División club Academia Puerto Cabello, on loan from Liga Portugal 2 club Vizela.

== Club career ==
Born in Saint-Louis, Mbaye began his career with local side AS Dakar Sacré-Cœur. In 2017, he agreed to a four-year contract with Uruguayan side Sud América, but after having trouble moving to Montevideo, he joined Cádiz CF on a one-year loan deal instead; he was initially a member of the reserves in Tercera División.

In 2018, after his contract with Cádiz expired, Mbaye went on trials at Elche CF and Real Murcia, and reportedly signed a deal with French side ES Troyes AC on 24 August of that year, after the club reached an agreement with Watford for his loan. In January of the following year, after not having international clearance to play, he moved to Croatian side NK Inter Zaprešić.

In July 2019, Mbaye returned to Cádiz, being again assigned to the B-team now in Segunda División B. He began the season as a starter in a 2–1 home win over Murcia, with the latter team later presenting a complaint to the RFEF and claiming Mbaye was ineligible to play; the appeal was denied in November.

On 3 March 2020, FIFA suspended Cádiz from signing new players for two transfer windows, after Watford claimed the player still had a valid contract with them. The following day, Mbaye said in a press conference that he never signed any deals with Watford. On 13 March, he was sidelined for the remainder of the season after fracturing his tibia.

Cádiz's suspension was lifted in May 2020, but Mbaye only returned to action the following January. He made his first team debut for the Yellow Submarine on 7 January 2021, starting in a 0–0 away draw (5–4 penalty win) against Pontevedra CF, for the season's Copa del Rey.

On 1 July 2021, the Court of Arbitration for Sport definitely cancelled Cádiz's suspension, and condemned Watford to pay the expenses of the process while also paying a compensation to Cádiz and Mbaye. Mbaye continued to feature for the B-team, before making the 2022 pre-season with the main squad.

On 9 June 2022, Mbaye renewed his contract with Cádiz until 2024. On 9 August, after impressing in the pre-season, he was definitely promoted to the first team in La Liga.

Mbaye made his professional debut on 10 September 2022, starting in a 4–0 home loss against FC Barcelona.

On 4 September 2024, Mbaye joined Liga Portugal 2 club Vizela on a one-year contract with the option to extend. In January 2025, he was sent on a one-year loan to Venezuelan Primera División side Academia Puerto Cabello.

== Career statistics ==
As of match played 4 June 2023

Appearances and goals by club, season and competition
Club	Season	League			Cup		Continental		Other		Total	
Club	Season	Division	Apps	Goals	Apps	Goals	Apps	Goals	Apps	Goals	Apps	Goals
Cádiz B	2017–18	Tercera División	20	2	—		—		1 (Note: Appearance(s) in Tercera División promotion play-offs)	0	21	2
Inter Zaprešić	2018–19	Prva HNL	0	0	—		—		—		0	0
Cádiz B	2019–20	Segunda División B	7	0	—		—		—		7	0
Cádiz B	2020–21	Segunda División B	11	1	—		—		—		11	1
Cádiz B	2021–22	Segunda División RFEF	13	3	—		—		—		13	3
Cádiz B	Total		31	4	—		—		—		31	4
Cádiz	2020–21	La Liga	0	0	1	0	—		—		1	0
Cádiz	2022–23	La Liga	14	0	1	0	—		—		15	0
Cádiz	Total		14	0	2	0	—		—		16	0
Career total			65	6	2	0	0	0	1	0	68	6
