= 2021–22 SD Amorebieta season =

SD Amorebieta
2021–22 season
- President: Jon Larrea
- Head coach: Iñigo Vélez
- Stadium: Urritxe
- Segunda División: 20th
- Copa del Rey: Second round
- Top goalscorer: League: Gorka Guruzeta (13); All: Gorka Guruzeta (13)
Home colours	Away colours	Third colours

The 2021–22 season was the 97th season in the existence of SD Amorebieta and the club's first ever season in the second division of Spanish football. In addition to the domestic league, Amorebieta participated in this season's edition of the Copa del Rey.

== Players ==
=== First-team squad ===
As of 2 February 2022

Note: Flags indicate national team as defined under FIFA eligibility rules; some limited exceptions apply. Players may hold more than one non-FIFA nationality.

No.	Pos.	Nation	Player
1	GK	ESP	Mikel Saizar
2	DF	ESP	Aitor Aldalur
3	DF	ESP	Josu Ozkoidi
4	MF	ESP	Javi Ros (on loan from Zaragoza)
5	MF	ESP	Lander Olaetxea
6	MF	ESP	Iker Bilbao
7	FW	ESP	Iker Unzueta
8	MF	ESP	Gorka Larrucea
9	FW	ESP	Koldo Obieta
10	MF	ESP	Mikel Álvaro
11	MF	ESP	Iker Seguín (captain)
12	MF	ESP	Mikel San José
13	GK	ESP	Roberto Santamaría
14	DF	ESP	Andoni López

No.	Pos.	Nation	Player
15	DF	ESP	Oier Luengo
16	MF	ESP	Markel Lozano
17	DF	ESP	Peru Nolaskoain (on loan from Athletic Bilbao)
18	MF	ESP	Álvaro Peña
19	DF	ESP	Jon Irazabal
20	FW	ESP	Iñigo Orozco
21	DF	ESP	Aimar Sagastibeltza
22	DF	ESP	Óscar Gil
23	MF	ESP	Asier Etxaburu
24	FW	ESP	Gorka Guruzeta
25	DF	ESP	Gaizka Larrazabal (on loan from Zaragoza)
29	FW	ESP	Sergio Moreno (on loan from Rayo)
30	GK	ESP	Unai Marino

=== Out on loan ===
Note: Flags indicate national team as defined under FIFA eligibility rules; some limited exceptions apply. Players may hold more than one non-FIFA nationality.

No.	Pos.	Nation	Player
—	GK	ESP	Mikel Goiria (at Uritarra until 30 June 2022)
—	DF	ESP	Beñat Garro (at Arenas Getxo until 30 June 2022)
—	DF	ESP	Beñat Leiza (at Sestao River until 30 June 2022)

No.	Pos.	Nation	Player
—	DF	ESP	Mikel Zarrabeitia (at SD Logroñés until 30 June 2022)
—	DF	ESP	Unai Uberuaga (at Getxo until 30 June 2022)

== Pre-season and friendlies ==
Win Draw Loss Fixtures

17 July 2021 Friendly	Alavés	5–2	Amorebieta	Vitoria-Gasteiz, Spain
18:00 CEST (UTC+2)	Martín 1'; Rioja 16'; Guidetti 52'; García 82'; Gagua 90'		Obieta 48'; Unzueta 67' (pen.)	Stadium: Ciudad Deportiva José Luis Compañón; Attendance: 0 Referee: Aitor Barrio Salas

28 July 2021 Friendly	Amorebieta	0–1	Osasuna	Amorebieta-Etxano, Spain
18:00 CEST (UTC+2)			Oroz 53'	Stadium: Urritxe; Attendance: 400; Referee: Gorka Etayo Herrera

4 August 2021 Friendly	Amorebieta	2–1	Eibar	Amorebieta-Etxano, Spain
18:00 CEST (UTC+2)				Stadium: Urritxe

== Competitions ==
=== Overall record ===
Competition	First match	Last match	Starting round	Final position	Record							
Competition	First match	Last match	Starting round	Final position	Pld	W	D	L	GF	GA	GD	Win %
Segunda División	14 August 2021	28 May 2022	Matchday 1	20th	40	8	16	16	43	58	−15	20.00
Copa del Rey	1 December 2021	16 December 2021	First round	Second round	2	1	0	1	2	2	+0	50.00
Total					42	9	16	17	45	60	−15	21.43

Last updated: 14 May 2022
Source: Soccerway

=== Segunda División ===
==== League table ====
Pos	Team	Pld	W	D	L	GF	GA	GD	Pts	Qualification or relegation
17	Sporting Gijón	42	11	13	18	43	48	−5	46	
18	Málaga	42	11	12	19	36	57	−21	45	
19	Amorebieta (R)	42	9	16	17	44	63	−19	43	Relegation to Primera Federación
20	Real Sociedad B (R)	42	10	10	22	43	61	−18	40	Relegation to Primera Federación
21	Fuenlabrada (R)	42	6	15	21	39	65	−26	33	Relegation to Primera Federación

Source: LaLiga SmartBank
Rules for classification: 1) points; 2) head-to-head points; 3) head-to-head goal difference; 4) goal difference; 5) number of goals scored
(R) Relegated

==== Results summary ====
Overall								Home						Away					
Pld	W	D	L	GF	GA	GD	Pts	W	D	L	GF	GA	GD	W	D	L	GF	GA	GD
42	9	16	17	44	63	−19	43	8	8	5	29	25	+4	1	8	12	15	38	−23

Source: La Liga SmartBank

==== Results by round ====
Round	1	2	3	4	5	6	7	8	9	10	11	12	13	14	15	16	17	18	19	20	21	22	23	24	25	26	27	28	29	30	31	32	33	34	35	36	37	38	39	40	41	42
Ground	A	A	H	A	H	A	H	H	A	H	A	H	A	H	A	H	A	H	A	H	A	A	H	A	H	H	A	H	A	H	A	H	A	H	A	H	A	H	A	H	A	H
Result	L	L	W	D	D	L	D	D	L	L	D	L	D	W	D	L	L	D	W	D	D	D	D	L	W	D	D	L	L	L	L	D	D	W	L	W	L	W	L	W	L	W
Position	22	22	16	19	19	21	21	21	21	21	21	21	21	20	21	21	21	21	20	20	20	19	19	20	19	19	19	19	20	20	20	21	21	19	19	19	20	20	20	20	20	20

Source: La Liga SmartBank
A = Away; H = Home; W = Win; D = Draw; L = Loss

==== Matches ====
The league fixtures were announced on 30 June 2021.

14 August 2021 1	Girona	2–0	Amorebieta	Girona
19:30 CEST (UTC+2)	Stuani 49'; Bustos 86'	Report		Stadium: Montilivi; Referee: David Gálvez Rascón

23 August 2021 2	Mirandés	2–0	Amorebieta	Miranda de Ebro
20:00 CEST (UTC+2)	Vicente 53'; Imanol 90'	Report		Stadium: Estadio Municipal de Anduva; Referee: Iván Caparrós Hernández

29 August 2021 3	Amorebieta	2–1	Almería	Lezama
17:00 CEST (UTC+2)	Bilbao 15'; Obieta 86'	Report	Sánchez 3'	Stadium: Lezama (field 2); Attendance: 592; Referee: Víctor García Verdura

5 September 2021 4	Ibiza	1–1	Amorebieta	Ibiza
16:00 CEST (UTC+2)		Report		Stadium: Can Misses; Referee: Raúl Martín González Francés

11 September 2021 5	Amorebieta	2–2	Burgos	Lezama
16:00 CEST (UTC+2)		Report		Stadium: Lezama (field 2); Referee: Alejandro Quintero González

18 September 2021 6	Leganés	1–0	Amorebieta	Leganés
18:15 CEST (UTC+2)				Stadium: Butarque

25 September 2021 7	Amorebieta	1–1	Eibar	Lezama
18:15 CEST (UTC+2)				Stadium: Lezama (field 2)

2 October 2021 8	Amorebieta	1–1	Sporting Gijón	Lezama
16:00 CEST (UTC+2)				Stadium: Lezama (field 2); Referee: Álvaro Moreno Aragón

16 October 2021 10	Amorebieta	2–3	Cartagena	Lezama
CEST (UTC+2)				Stadium: Lezama (field 2)

24 October 2021 12	Amorebieta	1–2	Real Sociedad B	Lezama
CEST (UTC+2)				Stadium: Lezama (field 2)

3 November 2021 14	Amorebieta	4–1	Valladolid	Lezama
CET (UTC+1)				Stadium: Lezama (field 2)

14 November 2021 16	Amorebieta	1–3	Lugo	Lezama
CET (UTC+1)				Stadium: Lezama (field 2)

28 November 2021 18	Amorebieta	1–1	Zaragoza	Lezama
CET (UTC+1)				Stadium: Lezama (field 2)

12 December 2021 20	Amorebieta	1–1	Las Palmas	Lezama
CET (UTC+1)				Stadium: Lezama (field 2)

7 January 2022 23	Amorebieta	1–1	Tenerife	Lezama
CET (UTC+1)				Stadium: Lezama (field 2)

6 February 2022 26	Amorebieta	1–1	Oviedo	Lezama
CET (UTC+1)				Stadium: Lezama (field 2)

21 February 2022 28	Amorebieta	1–3	Leganés	Lezama
CET (UTC+1)				Stadium: Lezama (field 2)

6 March 2022 30	Amorebieta	1–2	Málaga	Lezama
CET (UTC+1)				Stadium: Lezama (field 2)

20 March 2022 32	Amorebieta	0–0	Alcorcón	Lezama
CET (UTC+1)				Stadium: Lezama (field 2)

2 April 2022 34	Amorebieta	3–1	Ibiza	Lezama
CEST (UTC+2)				Stadium: Lezama (field 2)

9 April 2022 35	Las Palmas	1–0	Amorebieta	Las Palmas
21:00 CET (UTC+1)	Kirian Rodríguez 48'; Sadiku (yellow card) 90'; Fabio González (yellow card) 90+2'	Report	Aitor Aldalur (yellow card) 25'; Javi Ros (yellow card) 31'; Óscar Gil (yellow card) 76'	Stadium: Estadio Gran Canaria; Attendance: 12,825; Referee: Víctor García Verdura

15 April 2022 36	Amorebieta	1–0	Mirandés	Lezama
CEST (UTC+2)				Stadium: Lezama (field 2)

23 April 2022 37	Real Sociedad B	2–1	Amorebieta	San Sebastián
14:00 CEST (UTC+2)	Arambarri (yellow card) 20'; Sola 38'; López 45+1'	Report	Irazabal (yellow card) 4'; Guruzeta (penalty missed) 21', 53'; Santamaría (yellow card) 45'; Gil (yellow card) 90+5'	Stadium: Anoeta; Attendance: 3,038; Referee: Raúl Frances

1 May 2022 38	Amorebieta	2–1	Fuenlabrada	Lezama
CEST (UTC+2)				Stadium: Lezama (field 2)

7 May 2022 39	Almería	3–0	Amorebieta	Almería
18:15 CET	Andoni López 54' (o.g.); Babić 75'; Sadiq 89'	Report	Andoni López (yellow card) 52'; Jon Irazabal (yellow card) 71'; Olaetxea (yellow card) 90+5'	Stadium: Estadio de los Juegos Mediterráneos; Attendance: 13,478; Referee: (Spain) Javier Iglesias Villanueva

14 May 2022 40	Amorebieta	1–0	Huesca	Lezama
CEST (UTC+2)				Stadium: Lezama (field 2)

21 May 2022 41	Cartagena	5–0	Amorebieta	Cartagena
20:00 CEST (UTC+2)	Castro 18' (pen.), 65', 68'; Bodiger 44'; Gallar 56'			Stadium: Estadio Cartagonova; Referee: Víctor García Verdura

28 May 2022 42	Amorebieta	1–0	Ponferradina	Lezama
CEST (UTC+2)				Stadium: Lezama (field 2)
