= 2023–24 SD Amorebieta season =

SD Amorebieta
2023–24 season
- President: Jon Larrea
- Head coach: Haritz Mújika (until 11 December); Jandro (from 13 December)
- Stadium: Urritxe
- Segunda División: 19th
- Copa del Rey: Round of 32
- Top goalscorer: League: Eneko Jauregi (6); All: Eneko Jauregi (6)
Home colours	Away colours

The 2023–24 season is Sociedad Deportiva Amorebieta's 99th season in existence and first one back in the Segunda División, the second division of association football in Spain. They will also compete in the Copa del Rey.

== Players ==
=== First-team squad ===
As of 4 March 2024.

Note: Flags indicate national team as defined under FIFA eligibility rules; some limited exceptions apply. Players may hold more than one non-FIFA nationality.

No.	Pos.	Nation	Player
1	GK	ESP	Unai Marino
2	DF	ESP	Jorge Mier
3	DF	ESP	Xabi Etxeita
5	DF	ESP	Unai Bustinza
6	MF	VEN	Jorge Yriarte (on loan from Eibar)
7	MF	ESP	Josué Dorrio
8	MF	ESP	Erik Morán
9	FW	ESP	Eneko Jauregi
10	MF	AUS	Ryan Edwards
11	MF	ESP	Iker Seguín (captain)
13	GK	ESP	Jonmi Magunagoitia
14	MF	ESP	Javi Eraso

No.	Pos.	Nation	Player
15	DF	ESP	Álvaro Núñez
16	DF	ESP	Daniel Lasure
17	MF	ESP	Rayco Rodríguez
19	FW	CUW	Jürgen Locadia
20	MF	GHA	Kwasi Sibo
21	MF	ESP	Àlex Carbonell
22	MF	ESP	Jon Morcillo (on loan from Athletic Bilbao)
23	FW	ESP	Iker Unzueta (on loan from Vizela)
24	DF	ESP	Josep Gayá (on loan from Mallorca)
28	DF	ESP	Félix Garreta (on loan from Betis)
29	MF	ESP	Ángel Troncho (on loan from Eibar)
30	GK	ESP	Pablo Cuñat (on loan from Levante)

== Competitions ==
=== Overall record ===
Competition	First match	Last match	Starting round	Final position	Record							
Competition	First match	Last match	Starting round	Final position	Pld	W	D	L	GF	GA	GD	Win %
Segunda División	11 August 2023	2 June 2024	Matchday 1	20th	42	11	12	19	37	53	−16	26.19
Copa del Rey	6 December 2023	7 January 2024	Second round	Round of 32	2	1	0	1	3	4	−1	50.00
Total					44	12	12	20	40	57	−17	27.27

Source: Soccerway

=== Segunda División ===
==== League table ====
Pos	Team	Pld	W	D	L	GF	GA	GD	Pts	Qualification or relegation
17	Huesca	42	11	16	15	36	33	+3	49 (Note: Huesca finished ahead of Mirandés on head-to-head points: Huesca 1–1 Mirandés, Mirandés 0–3 Huesca)	
18	Mirandés	42	12	13	17	47	55	−8	49	
19	Amorebieta (R)	42	11	12	19	37	53	−16	45	Relegation to Primera Federación
20	Alcorcón (R)	42	10	14	18	32	53	−21	44	Relegation to Primera Federación
21	Andorra (R)	42	11	10	21	33	53	−20	43 (Note: Andorra finished ahead of Villarreal B on overall goal difference)	Relegation to Primera Federación

Updated to match(es) played on 2 Jun 2024. Source: LaLiga HyperMotion
Rules for classification: 1) Points; 2) Head-to-head points; 3) Head-to-head goal difference; 4) Goal difference; 5) Goals scored; 6) Fair-play points
(Note: Head-to-head record is used only after all the matches between the teams in question have been played)
(R) Relegated

==== Results summary ====
Overall								Home						Away					
Pld	W	D	L	GF	GA	GD	Pts	W	D	L	GF	GA	GD	W	D	L	GF	GA	GD
42	11	12	19	37	53	−16	45	7	6	8	21	18	+3	4	6	11	16	35	−19

Source: LaLiga.com

==== Results by round ====
Round	1	2	3	4	5	6	7	8	9	10	11	12	13	14	15	16	17	18	19	20	21	22	23	24	25	26	27	28	29	30	31	32	33	34
Ground	H	A	H	A	A	H	A	H	A	H	A	H	A	H	A	H	A	H	A	H	H	A	H	A	H	H	A	H	A	H	A	H	A	H
Result	D	D	W	L	L	W	L	D	L	L	L	D	L	L	D	W	L	L	L	D	L	D	L	L	L	W	D	D	W	L	W	W	D	W
Position	11	15	9	10	13	10	13	15	16	19	19	19	19	21	21	20	20	20	21	21	21	22	22	22	22	22	22	22	22	22	22	20		

Source: LaLiga.com
A = Away; H = Home; W = Win; D = Draw; L = Loss

==== Matches ====
The league fixtures were unveiled on 28 June 2023.

11 August 2023 1	Amorebieta	1–1	Levante	Lezama
19:00 CEST (UTC+2)	Jauregi 64'	Report	Bouldini 30'; Cantero (yellow card) 34'; Rey (yellow card) 45+1'	Stadium: Instalaciones de Lezama Campo 2 Attendance: 1,297; Referee: Dámaso Arcediano Monescillo

20 August 2023 2	Albacete	2–2	Amorebieta	Albacete
22:00 CEST (UTC+2)	Olaetxea (yellow card) 8'; Fuster 45+2'; Medina (yellow card) 45+5'; Quiles 49'	Report	Rodríguez 5'; Garreta 24'	Stadium: Carlos Belmonte; Attendance: 10,231; Referee: Iosu Galech Apezteguía

27 August 2023 3	Amorebieta	3–0	Andorra	Lezama
19:30 CEST (UTC+2)	Jauregi 39'; Eraso 53'; Etxeita (yellow card) 81'; Quintero (yellow card) 90'; Sibo 90+1'	Report	Petxarroman (yellow card) 42'	Stadium: Instalaciones de Lezama Campo 2 Attendance: 1,015; Referee: Germán Cid Camacho

3 September 2023 4	Espanyol	3–2	Amorebieta	Barcelona
18:30 CEST (UTC+2)	Calero 51', 81'; Salvi 78'	Report	Eraso 43'; Núñez 45+4'	Stadium: Stage Front Stadium; Attendance: 19,520; Referee: Manuel Jesús Orellana Cid

10 September 2023 5	Racing Santander	1–0	Amorebieta	Santander
16:15 CEST (UTC+2)	Martín 10'	Report		Stadium: Campos de Sport de El Sardinero; Referee: Miguel González Díaz

17 September 2023 6	Amorebieta	2–0	Mirandés	Lezama
14:00 CEST (UTC+2)	Edwards 7', 8'; Morán (yellow card) 40'; Jauregi (yellow card) 72'; Carbonell (yellow card) 79'	Report	Ramón (yellow card) 72'; Reina (yellow card) 83'	Stadium: Instalaciones de Lezama Campo 2 Referee: Daniel Jesús Trujillo Suárez

24 September 2023 7	Villarreal B	3–1	Amorebieta	Villarreal
14:00 CEST (UTC+2)	Ontiveros 32'; Forés 48'; Leković 60'; Adriano (yellow card) 70'; Requena (yellow card) 80'	Report	Hernando 55', (yellow card) 75'; Da Graca (yellow card) 55'; Dorrio (yellow card) 64'; Edwards (yellow card) 64'	Stadium: Estadio de la Cerámica; Attendance: 1,233; Referee: Luis Mario Milla Alvendiz

1 October 2023 8	Amorebieta	0–0	Cartagena	Lezama
18:30 CEST (UTC+2)		Report		Stadium: Instalaciones de Lezama Campo 2 Referee: Óliver de la Fuente Ramos

5 October 2023 9	Racing Ferrol	1–0	Amorebieta	Ferrol
21:30 CEST (UTC+2)		Report		Referee: Saúl Ais Reig

8 October 2023 10	Amorebieta	1–2	Eibar	Lezama
14:00 CEST (UTC+2)				Stadium: Instalaciones de Lezama Campo 2 Referee: Raúl Martín González Francés

15 October 2023 11	Leganés	6–0	Amorebieta	Leganés
18:30 CEST (UTC+2)				Stadium: Estadio Municipal de Butarque; Referee: Andrés Fuentes Molina

18 November 2023 16	Amorebieta	2–0	Tenerife	Lezama
18:30 CET (UTC+1)				Stadium: Instalaciones de Lezama Campo 2 Referee: Salvador Lax Franco

26 November 2023 17	Elche	2–0	Amorebieta	Elche
16:15 CET (UTC+1)				Stadium: Estadio Martínez Valero; Referee: Dámaso Arcediano Monescillo

3 December 2023 18	Amorebieta	0–1	Burgos	Lezama
21:00 CET (UTC+1)				Stadium: Instalaciones de Lezama Campo 2

4 February 2024 25	Amorebieta	0–1	Racing Santander	Lezama
16:15 CET (UTC+1)	Bustinza (yellow card) 29'; Yriarte (yellow card) 42'; Morán (yellow card) 90+4'		Fernández 15'; García (yellow card) 19'; Sangalli (yellow card) 36'; Aldasoro (yellow card) 38'	Stadium: Instalaciones de Lezama Campo 2 Referee: Iván Caparrós Hernández

10 February 2024 26	Amorebieta	1–0	Elche	Lezama
16:15 CET (UTC+1)	Dorrio 56'			Stadium: Instalaciones de Lezama Campo 2 Referee: Miguel González Díaz

18 February 2024 27	Huesca	0–0	Amorebieta	Huesca
18:30 CET (UTC+1)	Nieto (yellow card) 4'; Sielva (yellow card) 90+1'		Carbonell (yellow card) 28'	Stadium: Estadio El Alcoraz; Referee: Rafael Sánchez López

25 February 2024 28	Amorebieta	1–1	Albacete	Lezama
21:00 CET (UTC+1)	Seguín (yellow card) 22'; Garreta (yellow card) 45+2'; Etxeita (yellow card) 59'; Unzueta 66'		Rodríguez (yellow card) 30'; Bustinza 31' (o.g.); Isaac (yellow card) 54'; Olaetxea (yellow card) 70'; Djetei (yellow card) 71'; Silva (yellow card) 73'; Marchán (yellow card) 81'	Stadium: Instalaciones de Lezama Campo 2 Referee: Oliver de la Fuente Ramos

3 March 2024 29	Zaragoza	0–1	Amorebieta	Zaragoza
18:30 CET (UTC+1)	Mollejo (yellow card) 60'; Lluís López (yellow card) 69'; Mouriño (yellow card) 81'	Report	Morci (yellow card) 49'; Morci 90+7'	Stadium: La Romareda; Referee: Luis Mario Milla Alvendiz

11 March 2024 30	Amorebieta	0–1	Leganés	Lezama
20:30 CET (UTC+1)	Sibo (yellow card) 63'; Morán (yellow card) 90+2'	Report	Neyou (red card) 35'; Undabarrena (yellow card) 52'; Cruz 77'	Stadium: Instalaciones de Lezama Campo 2 Referee: Salvador Lax Franco

18 March 2024 31	Andorra	0–1	Amorebieta	Andorra la Vella
20:30 CET (UTC+1)	Orellana (yellow card) 74'; Marsà (yellow card) 82'; Vilanova (yellow card) 86'	Report	Bustinza (yellow card) 34', (goal) 88'; Lasure (yellow card) 61'	Stadium: Estadi Nacional; Referee: Iosu Galech Apezteguía

24 March 2024 32	Amorebieta	3–1	Sporting Gijón	Lezama
14:00 CET (UTC+1)	Jauregi 23'; Morcillo 45+1'; Garreta (yellow card) 48'; Edwards 90+1'		Otero 43'; Varane (yellow card) 61'	Stadium: Instalaciones de Lezama Campo 2 Referee: Daniel Jesús Trujillo Suárez

31 March 2024 33	Alcorcón	1–1	Amorebieta	Alcorcón
14:00 CEST (UTC+2)				Stadium: Santo Domingo; Referee: Miguel Sesma Espinosa

5 April 2024 34	Amorebieta	3–1	Racing Ferrol	Lezama
14:00 CEST (UTC+2)				Stadium: Instalaciones de Lezama Campo 2 Referee: Rubén Ávalos Barrera

13 April 2024 35	Levante	1–2	Amorebieta	Valencia
21:00 CEST (UTC+2)				Stadium: Estadi Ciutat de València; Referee: Germán Cid Camacho

20 April 2024 36	Amorebieta	0–3	Valladolid	Lezama
14:00 CEST (UTC+2)				Stadium: Instalaciones de Lezama Campo 2 Referee: Manuel Jesús Orellana Cid

28 April 2024 37	Burgos	2–2	Amorebieta	Burgos
16:15 CEST (UTC+2)	Niño 8'; Sánchez 47'		Morcillo 77', 79'	Stadium: Estadio El Plantío; Referee: Andrés Fuentes Molina

5 May 2024 38	Eibar	5–0	Amorebieta	Eibar
14:00 CEST (UTC+2)	Stoichkov 10'; Aketxe 45+3' (pen.); Corpas 49'; Bautista 79'; De la Fuente 82'			Stadium: Ipurua Municipal Stadium; Referee: Rubén Ávalos Barrera

12 May 2024 39	Amorebieta	2–0	Villarreal B	Lezama
14:00 CEST (UTC+2)	Unzueta 73' (pen.); Edwards 90+10'		Espigares (red card) 47'	Stadium: Instalaciones de Lezama Campo 2 Referee: Daniel Jesús Trujillo Suárez

19 May 2024 40	Tenerife	0–1	Amorebieta	Santa Cruz de Tenerife
20:00 WEST (UTC+1)			Unzueta 50' (pen.)	Stadium: Estadio Heliodoro Rodríguez López; Referee: Oliver de la Fuente Ramos

26 May 2024 41	Amorebieta	0–0	Espanyol	Lezama
18:30 CEST (UTC+2)				Stadium: Instalaciones de Lezama Campo 2 Referee: Dámaso Arcediano Monescillo

2 June 2024 42	Mirandés	1–0	Amorebieta	Miranda de Ebro
18:30 CEST (UTC+2)	Martínez 62'			Stadium: Estadio Municipal de Anduva

=== Copa del Rey ===
6 December 2023 Second round	Levante	0–1	Amorebieta	Valencia
19:00 CET (UTC+1)	Muñoz (yellow card) 62'	Report	Eraso (yellow card) 55', (goal) 71'; Carbonell (yellow card) 65'	Stadium: Estadi Ciutat de València; Attendance: 11,216; Referee: Miguel Sesma Espinosa

7 January 2024 Round of 32	Amorebieta	2–4	Celta Vigo	Lezama
12:00 CET (UTC+1)	Jauregi 30'; Rayco 35'	Report	Rodríguez 6'; Jailson (yellow card) 4', (goal) 49'; Douvikas 52', 75'; Núñez (yellow card) 70'	Stadium: Instalaciones de Lezama Campo 2 Attendance: 1,300; Referee: José Luis Munuera Montero
