= List of Spanish football transfers winter 2021–22 =

This is a list of Spanish football transfers for the winter 2021–22 sale in La Liga and the Segunda División.

The Spanish winter transfer window opened on 2 January 2022, although a few transfers were announced prior to that date. The window closed at midnight on 31 January 2022. Players without a club can join one at any time, either during or in between transfer windows. Clubs below La Liga level can also sign players on loan at any time. If need be, clubs can sign a goalkeeper on an emergency loan, if all others are unavailable.

== Winter 2021–22 La Liga transfer window ==
Date	Name	Moving from	Moving to	Fee
12 November 2021	(Brazil) Dani Alves	Free Agent	Barcelona	Free
27 December 2021	(Brazil) Rafinha	(France) Paris Saint-Germain	Real Sociedad	Loan
28 December 2021	(Ivory Coast) Lago Junior	Mallorca	Huesca	Loan
28 December 2021	(Spain) Dani Romera	Ponferradina	Nàstic	Loan
31 December 2021	(Georgia (country)) Giorgi Mamardashvili	(Georgia (country)) Dinamo Tbilisi	Valencia	€1m
1 January 2022	(Spain) Ferran Torres	(England) Manchester City	Barcelona	Undisclosed
2 January 2022	(Spain) Jon Morcillo	Athletic Bilbao	Real Valladolid	Loan
3 January 2022	(Spain) Jason	Valencia	Alavés	Undisclosed
4 January 2022	(Argentina) Gonzalo Escalante	(Italy) Lazio	Alavés	Loan
4 January 2022	(Spain) Mateo Joseph	Espanyol	(England) Leeds United	Undisclosed
4 January 2022	(Spain) Borja Valle	(United Arab Emirates) Khor Fakkan	Alcorcón	Free
5 January 2022	(Spain) José Ángel Pozo	Rayo Vallecano	(Qatar) Al Ahli Doha	Loan
5 January 2022	(Spain) Álvaro Vadillo	Espanyol	Málaga	Loan
6 January 2022	(Spain) Miguel Baeza	Celta Vigo	Ponferradina	Loan
6 January 2022	(Spain) Martín Calderón	Cádiz	Mirandés	Loan
6 January 2022	(Spain) Fede San Emeterio	Real Valladolid	Cádiz	Loan
7 January 2022	(Spain) Álex Collado	Barcelona	Granada	Loan
7 January 2022	(Brazil) Philippe Coutinho	Barcelona	(England) Aston Villa	Loan
7 January 2022	(Mexico) Orbelín Pineda	(Mexico) Cruz Azul	Celta Vigo	Undisclosed
7 January 2022	(England) Kieran Trippier	Atlético Madrid	(England) Newcastle United	Undisclosed
8 January 2022	(Morocco) Mohamed Bouldini	(Portugal) Santa Clara	Fuenlabrada	Loan
10 January 2022	(Spain) Alberto Jiménez	Tenerife	Albacete	Loan
11 January 2022	(Spain) Chema	Getafe	Eibar	Loan
11 January 2022	(Spain) Robert Ibáñez	Osasuna	Leganés	Loan
12 January 2022	(Argentina) Nahuel Tenaglia	(Argentina) Talleres	Alavés	Loan
13 January 2022	(France) Ibrahim Amadou	Sevilla	(France) Metz	Undisclosed
13 January 2022	(Spain) Marc Gual	Alcorcón	(Ukraine) Dnipro-1	Free
13 January 2022	(Spain) Borja Mayoral	Real Madrid	Getafe	Loan
13 January 2022	(Spain) Rober	Real Betis	Las Palmas	Loan
13 January 2022	(Spain) Gonzalo Villar	(Italy) Roma	Getafe	Loan
14 January 2022	(Mexico) Jesús Corona	(Portugal) Porto	Sevilla	Undisclosed
14 January 2022	(Spain) Pablo Martínez	Levante	Huesca	Loan
15 January 2022	(Nigeria) Mikel Agu	(Portugal) Vitória de Guimarães	Fuenlabrada	Undisclosed
15 January 2022	(Morocco) Abdel Al Badaoui	Alcorcón	(Belgium) Waasland-Beveren	Loan
15 January 2022	(Spain) Javier Avilés	Leganés	(Portugal) Tondela	Loan
15 January 2022	(Spain) Iván Calero	Málaga	Alcorcón	Loan
15 January 2022	(Uruguay) Sebastián Cristóforo	Girona	Cartagena	Free
15 January 2022	(Italy) Cristiano Piccini	Valencia	(Serbia) Red Star Belgrade	Undisclosed
16 January 2022	(Spain) José Ángel	(United Arab Emirates) Al Wahda	Alcorcón	Undisclosed
17 January 2022	(Spain) Marc Lachevre	Espanyol	Peña Deportiva	Loan
17 January 2022	(Spain) Óscar	Sevilla	Getafe	Loan
17 January 2022	(Romania) Alex Pașcanu	(Romania) Cluj	Ponferradina	Undisclosed
17 January 2022	(Netherlands) Tonny Vilhena	(Russia) Krasnodar	Espanyol	Loan
18 January 2022	(Croatia) Toni Datković	(United States) Real Salt Lake	Cartagena	Undisclosed
18 January 2022	(Spain) Sergio Moreno	Rayo Vallecano	Amorebieta	Loan
18 January 2022	(Ecuador) Joel Valencia	(England) Brentford	Alcorcón	Loan
19 January 2022	(Spain) Jaume Grau	Osasuna	Real Zaragoza	Undisclosed
20 January 2022	(Spain) Jorge Aguirre	Real Sociedad B	Mirandés	Loan
20 January 2022	(Spain) Rubén Alcaraz	Real Valladolid	Cádiz	Loan
20 January 2022	(Morocco) Oussama Idrissi	Sevilla	Cádiz	Loan
21 January 2022	(Spain) Adrián	Real Zaragoza	Fuenlabrada	Free
21 January 2022	(Spain) Íñigo Eguaras	Real Zaragoza	Almería	Undisclosed
21 January 2022	(Serbia) Filip Malbašić	Cádiz	Burgos	Free
21 January 2022	(Spain) Peru Nolaskoain	Athletic Bilbao	Amorebieta	Loan
21 January 2022	(Spain) Sergio Rico	(France) Paris Saint-Germain	Mallorca	Loan
21 January 2022	(Spain) David Timor	Getafe	Huesca	Free
22 January 2022	(Serbia) Ivan Šaponjić	Atlético Madrid	(Slovakia) Slovan Bratislava	Undisclosed
24 January 2022	(Spain) Mikel Zarrabeitia	Amorebieta	Logroñés	Loan
25 January 2022	(Peru) Luis Abram	Granada	(Mexico) Cruz Azul	Loan
25 January 2022	(Nigeria) Emmanuel Apeh	Tenerife	Alcorcón	Loan
25 January 2022	(Switzerland) Eray Cömert	(Switzerland) Basel	Valencia	Undisclosed
25 January 2022	(France) Anthony Martial	(England) Manchester United	Sevilla	Loan
25 January 2022	(Guinea-Bissau) Claudio Mendes	Las Palmas	Rayo Majadahonda	Loan
25 January 2022	(Spain) Darío Poveda	Getafe	Huesca	Loan
26 January 2022	(Spain) Josema	Elche	Real Valladolid	Loan
26 January 2022	(Spain) Tachi	Alavés	Fuenlabrada	Loan
26 January 2022	(Turkey) Okay Yokuşlu	Celta Vigo	Getafe	Loan
27 January 2022	(Colombia) Iván Arboleda	Rayo Vallecano	(Argentina) Newell's Old Boys	Loan
27 January 2022	(Argentina) Julio Buffarini	Huesca	Cartagena	Loan
27 January 2022	(Peru) Aldair Fuentes	Fuenlabrada	(Peru) Alianza Lima	Loan
27 January 2022	(Spain) Jon Ander Garrido	Cádiz	Mirandés	Loan
27 January 2022	(Spain) Andrés Martín	Rayo Vallecano	Tenerife	Loan
27 January 2022	(Spain) Iván Martín	Villarreal	Girona	Loan
27 January 2022	(Spain) Unai Rementería	Mirandés	Bilbao Athletic	Loan
27 January 2022	(Spain) Gerard Valentín	Lugo	Huesca	Undisclosed
27 January 2022	(Denmark) Daniel Wass	Valencia	Atlético Madrid	€2.5m
28 January 2022	(Uruguay) Gastón Álvarez	(Uruguay) Boston River	Getafe	Loan
28 January 2022	(Spain) Álex Blesa	Levante	Castellón	Loan
28 January 2022	(Spain) Juan Hernández	Alcorcón	Ponferradina	Free
28 January 2022	(Spain) Andoni López	Logroñés	Amorebieta	Undisclosed
28 January 2022	(Spain) Álex Millán	Villarreal	(Belgium) Union	Loan
28 January 2022	(Guinea) Ilaix Moriba	(Germany) RB Leipzig	Valencia	Loan
28 January 2022	(Cameroon) Allan Nyom	Getafe	Leganés	Free
28 January 2022	(Paraguay) Isidro Pitta	Huesca	(Brazil) Juventude	Loan
28 January 2022	(Spain) Cristian Rivero	Valencia	Alcorcón	Loan
28 January 2022	(Spain) José Aurelio Suárez	Alcorcón	(Japan) Tokushima Vortis	Undisclosed
28 January 2022	(Republic of the Congo) Warren Tchimbembé	(France) Metz	Mirandés	Loan
29 January 2022	(Croatia) Niko Datković	(Austria) Admira Wacker	Mirandés	Unidsclosed
29 January 2022	(Uruguay) Giovanni González	(Uruguay) Peñarol	Mallorca	Undisclosed
29 January 2022	(Spain) Álvaro Jiménez	Cádiz	Ibiza	Loan
29 January 2022	(Spain) Javier Ontiveros	Villarreal	Fuenlabrada	Undisclosed
29 January 2022	(Serbia) Njegoš Petrović	(Serbia) Red Star Belgrade	Granada	€1.5m
29 January 2022	(Spain) Jorge Sáenz	Valencia	Mirandés	Loan
29 January 2022	(Spain) Adama Traoré	(England) Wolverhampton Wanderers	Barcelona	Loan
29 January 2022	(Spain) Luis Valcarce	(Poland) Arka Gdynia	Alcorcón	Undisclosed
29 January 2022	(Morocco) Yacine Qasmi	Rayo Vallecano	Leganés	Free
30 January 2022	(Spain) Adrián Butzke	Granada	(Portugal) Paços de Ferreira	Loan
30 January 2022	(Uruguay) Martín Cáceres	(Italy) Cagliari	Levante	Undisclosed
30 January 2022	(Spain) Jony	(Italy) Lazio	Sporting Gijón	Loan
30 January 2022	(Venezuela) Eric Ramírez	(Ukraine) Dynamo Kyiv	Sporting Gijón	Loan
30 January 2022	(Spain) Javi Ros	Real Zaragoza	Amorebieta	Loan
30 January 2022	(Spain) Raúl Sánchez	Rayo Majadahonda	Ibiza	Undisclosed
30 January 2022	(Spain) Javi Vázquez	Ibiza	Racing Santander	Loan
31 January 2022	(Uruguay) Matías Arezo	(Uruguay) River Plate Montevideo	Granada	Undisclosed
31 January 2022	(Colombia) Juan Camilo Becerra	Espanyol	Gimnàstic Tarragona	Loan
31 January 2022	(Spain) Jordi Calavera	Girona	Sporting Gijón	Loan
31 January 2022	(Spain) Pablo Clavería	Cartagena	Lugo	Free
31 January 2022	(Spain) Asier Córdoba	Alcorcón	Logroñés	Free
31 January 2022	(Spain) Bryan Gil	(England) Tottenham Hotspur	Valencia	Loan
31 January 2022	(France) Jimmy Giraudon	(France) Troyes	Leganés	Loan
31 January 2022	(Spain) Mario González	(Portugal) Braga	Tenerife	Loan
31 January 2022	(Spain) Luis Hernández	(Israel) Maccabi Tel Aviv	Cádiz	Undisclosed
31 January 2022	(Spain) Dani Jiménez	Alcorcón	Leganés	Free
31 January 2022	(Argentina) Giovani Lo Celso	(England) Tottenham Hotspur	Villarreal	Loan
31 January 2022	(Mozambique) Reinildo Mandava	(France) Lille	Atlético Madrid	Undisclosed
31 January 2022	(Spain) Jordi Mboula	Mallorca	(Portugal) Estoril Praia	Loan
31 January 2022	(Spain) Sabin Merino	Leganés	Real Zaragoza	Free
31 January 2022	(Kosovo) Vedat Muriqi	(Italy) Lazio	Mallorca	Loan
31 January 2022	(Spain) Roberto Olabe	Eibar	Alcorcón	Undisclosed
31 January 2022	(Uruguay) Lucas Olaza	Real Valladolid	Elche	Loan
31 January 2022	(Spain) Iñaki Peña	Barcelona	(Turkey) Galatasaray	Loan
31 January 2022	(Spain) Kike Pérez	Real Valladolid	Elche	Loan
31 January 2022	(Spain) Lucas Pérez	Elche	Cádiz	Undisclosed
31 January 2022	(Argentina) Ezequiel Ponce	(Russia) Spartak Moscow	Elche	Loan
31 January 2022	(Spain) Hugo Rama	Lugo	Real Oviedo	Free
31 January 2022	(Spain) Iván Sánchez	(England) Birmingham City	Real Valladolid	Loan
31 January 2022	(Senegal) Mamadou Sylla	Alavés	Rayo Vallecano	Loan
31 January 2022	(Spain) Rodri Tarín	Leganés	Real Oviedo	Free
31 January 2022	(Mauritania) Idrissa Thiam	(Mauritania) ASAC Concorde	Lugo	Undisclosed
31 January 2022	(Albania) Myrto Uzuni	(Hungary) Ferencváros	Granada	Undisclosed
31 January 2022	(Spain) Manu Vallejo	Valencia	Alavés	Loan
31 January 2022	(Argentina) Axel Werner	Elche	(Argentina) Arsenal de Sarandí	Loan
1 February 2022	(Spain) Monchu	Granada	Real Valladolid	Loan
1 February 2022	(Spain) Riki	Real Oviedo	Albacete	Loan
1 February 2022	(Spain) Víctor Sánchez	(Australia) Western United	Girona	Free
2 February 2022	(Gabon) Pierre-Emerick Aubameyang	(England) Arsenal	Barcelona	Free
2 February 2022	(Spain) Álex Mula	Fuenlabrada	Alcorcón	Loan
2 February 2022	(Spain) Dani Raba	Villarreal	Granada	Free
1 July 2022	(Spain) Fran Villalba	(England) Birmingham City	Sporting Gijón	Undisclosed
