= Mikel Zarrabeitia (footballer) =

Spanish footballer (born 1993)

Personal information
- Full name: Mikel Zarrabeitia Ipiña
- Date of birth: 20 July 1993 (age 33)
- Place of birth: Galdakao, Spain
- Height: 1.79 m (5 ft 10 in)
- Position: Right back

Youth career
- Amorebieta
- 2009–2011: Athletic Bilbao
- 2011–2012: Amorebieta

Senior career*
Years	Team	Apps	(Gls)
2012–2022	Amorebieta	43	(0)
2012–2013	→ Derio (loan)		
2014	→ Somorrostro (loan)		
2014–2015	→ Gernika (loan)	24	(0)
2015–2016	→ Zamudio (loan)	33	(5)
2016–2017	→ Portugalete (loan)	27	(1)
2018	→ Zamudio (loan)	8	(0)
2022	→ Logroñés (loan)	8	(0)
2023	Somozas	4	(1)
2023–2024	Gernika	6	(0)
- * Club domestic league appearances and goals as of 10 December 2023

Mikel Zarrabeitia Ipiña (born 20 July 1993) is a Spanish footballer who plays as a right back.

== Club career ==
Born in Galdakao, Biscay, Basque Country, Zarrabeitia joined Athletic Bilbao's Lezama academy in 2009, from SD Amorebieta. After leaving the Lions in 2011, he returned to his previous club and moved on loan to CD Derio in the regional leagues in 2012, after finishing his formation.

Upon returning, Zarrabeitia was assigned to the main squad of the Azules in Segunda División B for the 2013–14 season, but featured rarely before moving on loan to JD Somorrostro in January 2014. In the following three years, he served loan stints at Tercera División sides Gernika Club, Zamudio SD and Club Portugalete.

On 13 January 2018, after failing to play a single minute for Amorebieta during the first half of the campaign, Zarrabeitia returned to Zamudio on loan until June. He returned from loan in July 2018, and was mainly used as a backup to Aitor Aldalur as his side achieved a first-ever promotion to Segunda División in the 2020–21 campaign.

Zarrabeitia made his professional debut at the age of 28 on 25 September 2021, coming on as a second-half substitute for Iker Bilbao in a 0–1 away loss against CD Leganés. The following 24 January, after only two further league matches, he was loaned to Primera División RFEF side SD Logroñés for the remainder of the campaign.
