= Aitor Seguín =

Spanish footballer (born 1995)

Personal information
- Full name: Aitor Seguín Cid
- Date of birth: 27 February 1995 (age 31)
- Place of birth: Eibar, Spain
- Height: 1.79 m (5 ft 10 1/2 in)
- Position: Winger

Team information
- Current team: Sestao River
- Number: 17

Youth career
- 2005–2012: Athletic Bilbao

Senior career*
Years	Team	Apps	(Gls)
2012–2014	Basconia	62	(13)
2014–2021	Bilbao Athletic	68	(6)
2020	→ Barakaldo (loan)	7	(0)
2020–2021	→ Barakaldo (loan)	26	(7)
2021–2023	Real Unión	57	(1)
2023–2024	UD Logroñés	29	(3)
2024	Numancia	12	(1)
2025	Arenas Club	14	(2)
2025–	Sestao River	23	(2)

International career
2011	Spain U16	2	(0)
2012	Spain U17	2	(0)
- * Club domestic league appearances and goals as of 14 May 2026

Aitor Seguín Cid (born 27 February 1995) is a Spanish professional footballer who plays as a left winger for Segunda Federación club Sestao River. He previously played for Bilbao Athletic, Barakaldo, Real Unión, UD Logroñés, Numancia and Arenas Club.

== Club career ==
Born in Eibar, Gipuzkoa, Basque Country, Seguín joined Athletic Bilbao's youth setup in 2005, aged ten. He made his debut as a senior with the farm team in the 2012–13 campaign, in the fourth tier.

On 26 May 2014, after scoring 11 goals for Basconia, Seguín was promoted to the reserves in Segunda División B. He appeared in 35 matches and scored three goals over the course of the season, as the B-side returned to Segunda División after a 19-year absence, via the play-offs.

Seguín made his professional debut on 24 August 2015, starting in a 0–1 home loss against Girona FC. He scored his first goal in the second tier on 6 September, netting his team's second in a 3–1 home win against RCD Mallorca. In April 2016, having been involved in the majority of the season's fixtures and scored two further goals, Seguín suffered a rupture of the anterior cruciate ligament in his right knee, requiring a lengthy rehabilitation. He returned to the team nine months later at the end of January 2017, but only made seven appearances as a late substitute before the end of the campaign, having undergone minor keyhole surgery on the injury in March.

Seguin featured in two of the first three games of the 2017–18 season, but reported injured in September and did not play again in the calendar year. Similar injuries were endured by Iker Undabarrena, Seguín's long-time teammate (he also joined Athletic's academy as a 10-year-old in 2005) which hampered the development of both players and damaged their hopes of moving up to the senior squad; during Seguin's lengthy absences, fellow left winger Iñigo Córdoba was promoted instead.

He continued his rehabilitation throughout 2018–19, but was unable to resume playing, instead watching on as two other teammates with ACL injuries – Oihan Sancet and Iñigo Baqué – underwent treatment and returned to action on schedule. In August 2019, he underwent stem-cell therapy on his knee and returned to training in November, though he was not registered to play in competitive fixtures for Bilbao Athletic. In January 2020, with the treatment apparently successful, he moved on loan to local club Barakaldo CF. On 21 August 2020, Athletic confirmed a new loan deal with Barakaldo for the 2020–21 season.

Seguín signed on a permanent basis for Real Unión in June 2021. He joined UD Logroñés in 2023, dropping down a level from the Primera Federación to the Segunda Federación.

== Personal life ==
Seguín's elder brother Iker Seguín is also a footballer and a left winger by position; he also spent some time with Athletic Bilbao's reserves, later serving as captain of SD Amorebieta when they were promoted to the second tier in 2021.
