= Jon Irazabal =

Spanish footballer

Personal information
- Full name: Jon Irazabal Iraurgui
- Date of birth: 28 November 1996 (age 29)
- Place of birth: Bilbao, Spain
- Height: 1.87 m (6 ft 2 in)
- Position: Defender

Team information
- Current team: Johor Darul Ta'zim
- Number: 17

Youth career
- 2005–2006: Danok Bat
- 2006–2012: Athletic Bilbao
- 2012–2015: Danok Bat

Senior career*
Years	Team	Apps	(Gls)
2015–2016	Sondika		
2016–2019	Vitoria	34	(2)
2018–2019	→ Mirandés (loan)	5	(0)
2019–2020	Mirandés	0	(0)
2020	Leioa	6	(0)
2020–2022	Amorebieta	40	(1)
2022–2025	Sabah	79	(5)
2025–	Johor Darul Ta'zim	5	(4)

International career^{‡}
2025	Malaysia	2	(0)
- * Club domestic league appearances and goals as of 21:37, 7 October 2025 (UTC) ‡ National team caps and goals as of 6 September 2025

Jon Irazabal Iraurgui (born 28 November 1996) is a Spanish professional footballer who plays as a center-back or left-back for Malaysia Super League club Johor Darul Ta'zim. He represented Malaysia twice at international level; however, documents claiming his grandfather was Malaysian-born were found to be fabricated, and he was suspended from all football related activities after being sanctioned by FIFA in September 2025.

== Club career ==
Irazabal finished his formation at Danok Bat CF, after having a six-year spell in the youth sides of Athletic Bilbao. In 2015, he joined CD Sondika in the regional leagues, and made his senior debut during the campaign.

In July 2016, Irazabal signed for SD Eibar and was assigned to the farm team in Tercera División. On 6 July 2018, he was loaned to Segunda División B side CD Mirandés for one year.

Irazabal contributed with only five appearances during the whole 2018–19 season, as his side achieved promotion to Segunda División; his contract was automatically extended for a further year. On 21 January 2020, he terminated his contract with the club, and signed for SD Leioa in the third division the following day.

=== Amorebieta ===
On 15 July 2020, Irazabal left Leioa, and signed for fellow league team SD Amorebieta on 1 September. He was a regular starter for the Azules during the campaign, as his side achieved a first-ever promotion to the second division.

Irazabal made his professional debut on 14 August 2021, starting in a 0–2 away loss against Girona FC. In July of the following year, he moved abroad for the first time in his career and signed for Azerbaijan Premier League side Sabah FC.

=== Johor Daul Ta'zim ===
On 23 June 2025, Irazabal signed for a club outside of Europe for the first time when he was unveiled as the latest signing by Malaysian Super League side Johor Darul Ta'zim. A FIFA sanction in September 2025 suspended Irazabal from all footballing activities for the coming 12 months.

== International career ==
In June 2025, Irazabal was called up to the Malaysia national team for the 2027 AFC Asian Cup qualification matches. He made his international debut on 10 June, in the match against Vietnam at the Bukit Jalil National Stadium.

On 26 September 2025, Football Association of Malaysia (FAM), Irazabal, and six other Malaysian naturalized players were sanctioned by FIFA due to falsification and forgery of documents regarding the seven players' eligibility to play for Malaysia in the third round of the 2027 AFC Asian Cup qualifiers against Vietnam. Each players were fined CHF 2,000 (around MYR 10,560) and were suspended from all football related activities for 12 months. FAM has confirmed it will file an appeal against FIFA's ruling.

== Personal life ==
Born in Spain, Irazabal claimed to be of Malaysian descent through his grandfather. However, FIFA released a statement that his grandfather was not born in nor has Malaysian ancestry, as the documentation submitted by Football Association of Malaysia was proven to be doctored.

== Career statistics ==
=== Club ===
As of match played 31 May 2025

Appearances and goals by club, season and competition
Club	Season	League			National cup (Note: Includes Copa del Rey, Azerbaijan Cup)		Continental		Other		Total	
Club	Season	Division	Apps	Goals	Apps	Goals	Apps	Goals	Apps	Goals	Apps	Goals
Vitoria	2016–17	Tercera División	18	1	—		—		0	0	18	1
Vitoria	2017–18	Segunda División B	21	1	—		—		—		21	1
Vitoria	Total		39	2	—		—		0	0	39	2
Mirandés	2018–19	Segunda División B	5	1	0	0	—		0	0	5	1
Mirandés	2019–20	Segunda División	0	0	0	0	—		—		0	0
Mirandés	Total		5	1	0	0	—		0	0	5	1
Leioa	2019–20	Segunda División B	6	0	—		—		—		6	0
Amorebieta	2020–21	Segunda División B	21	1	1	0	—		2 (Note: Appearances in promotion play-offs)	0	24	1
Amorebieta	2021–22	Segunda División	19	0	0	0	—		—		19	0
Amorebieta	Total		40	1	1	0	—		2	0	43	1
Sabah	2022–23	Azerbaijan Premier League	30	2	1	0	—		—		31	2
Sabah	2023–24	Azerbaijan Premier League	25	3	0	0	3 (Note: Appearances in UEFA Conference League)	0	—		28	3
Sabah	2024–25	Azerbaijan Premier League	30	0	5	1	4	0	—		39	1
Sabah	Total		85	5	6	1	7	0	—		98	6
Career total			175	9	7	1	7	0	2	0	191	8

=== International ===
As of match played 4 September 2025

Appearances and goals by national team and year
National team	Year	Apps	Goals
Malaysia	2025	2	0
Total		2	0

== Honours ==
Mirandés

- Copa Federación de España: 2018–19

Sabah

- Azerbaijan Cup: 2024–25

Johor Darul Ta'zim

- Malaysia Charity Shield: 2025
