= 2026–27 Bolton Wanderers F.C. season =

138th season in existence of Bolton Wanderers FC

Bolton Wanderers
2026–27 season
- Owner: Football Ventures Ltd (92%), British Business Bank (8%)
- Chairman: Sharon Brittan
- Manager: Steven Schumacher
- Stadium: Toughsheet Community Stadium
- Championship: 17th
- FA Cup: Third round
- EFL Cup: First round
- Top goalscorer: League: Sam Dalby (7); All: Sam Dalby (7)
- Highest home attendance: 26,262 v Preston North End (15 August 2026, Championship)
- Lowest home attendance: 21,543 v Cardiff City (12 September 2026, Championship)
- Average home league attendance: 23,959
- Biggest win: 3–1 v Wolverhampton Wanderers (13 October 2026, Championship)
- Biggest defeat: 4–0 v Millwall (5 September 2026, Championship); 5–1 v Middlesbrough (23 October 2026, Championship)
Home colours	Away colours	Third colours

The 2026–27 season is the 138th season in the history of Bolton Wanderers Football Club, and the club's first season in the Championship since 2018–19, following promotion from League One via the play-offs in the previous season. In addition to the domestic league, the club is also participating in the FA Cup and the EFL Cup.

The home kit is a remade version of the home kit worn in the 2005–06 and 2006–07 seasons. The away kit is a remade version of the 2006–07 away kit. The third kit takes inspiration from kits from the early 1990s.

== Squad ==
=== First Team ===
As of 18 November 2026

Note: Flags indicate national team as defined under FIFA eligibility rules; some limited exceptions apply. Players may hold more than one non-FIFA nationality.

No.	Pos.	Nation	Player
1	GK	IRL	Jack Bonham
3	DF	LCA	Chris Forino-Joseph (vice-captain)
4	MF	ENG	Xavier Simons
5	DF	ENG	Lewis Brunt
6	DF	ENG	Ben Davies
7	FW	FRA	Kyliane Dong (on loan from FC Augsburg)
8	MF	WAL	Josh Sheehan
9	FW	CAN	Theo Bair (on loan from Auxerre)
10	FW	ENG	Sam Dalby
11	FW	BRB	Thierry Gale
12	MF	SCO	David Watson
13	GK	ENG	Nathan Broome
14	DF	ENG	Akin Famewo

No.	Pos.	Nation	Player
16	FW	ENG	Samuel Iling-Junior (on loan from Aston Villa)
17	MF	JPN	Atsuki Itō
18	DF	NIR	Eoin Toal (captain)
20	MF	POR	Rúben Rodrigues
21	MF	SCO	Ethan Erhahon
22	DF	ESP	Gaizka Larrazabal
23	GK	IRL	David Harrington
25	DF	ENG	Max Conway
26	FW	CAN	Jayden Nelson
27	DF	ENG	Luca Stephenson
31	GK	IRL	Gavin Bazunu
39	FW	SCO	Ryan Hardie (on loan from Wrexham)
45	FW	ENG	John McAtee

=== U21 squad ===
As of 26 October 2026

Note: Flags indicate national team as defined under FIFA eligibility rules; some limited exceptions apply. Players may hold more than one non-FIFA nationality.

No.	Pos.	Nation	Player
35	MF	ENG	Max Lott
54	FW	ENG	Toby Ritchie
—	GK	ENG	Luke Lomax
—	DF	IRL	Jack Mawditt
—	DF	ENG	Sam O'Neill
—	DF	ENG	Emile Oliver
—	DF	ENG	Charlie Paye

No.	Pos.	Nation	Player
—	DF	ENG	Harrison Rice
—	DF	ENG	Finn Wilkinson
—	MF	ENG	Harley Irwin
—	FW	ENG	Tom King
—	FW	ENG	Daeshon Lawrence
—	FW	ENG	Conor Lewis

=== Out on loan ===
Note: Flags indicate national team as defined under FIFA eligibility rules; some limited exceptions apply. Players may hold more than one non-FIFA nationality.

No.	Pos.	Nation	Player
32	DF	NIR	Sam Inwood (at Swindon Town until 31 May 2027)
33	FW	ENG	Charlie Warren (at Accrington Stanley until 31 May 2027)
—	DF	ENG	Richard Taylor (at Bromley until 31 May 2027)
—	DF	IRL	Lewis Temple (at Oldham Athletic until 31 May 2027)

No.	Pos.	Nation	Player
—	MF	ENG	Lucas Kirkpatrick (at FC United of Manchester until 23 November 2026)
—	MF	ENG	Harry Leigh (at Ashton United until 23 November 2026)
—	MF	ENG	Joel Randall (at Chesterfield until 31 May 2027)

== Transfers and contracts ==
=== In ===
Date	Pos.	Player	From	Fee	Ref.
15 June 2026 (Note: The transfer was announced on 1 June, and would become official on 15 June once the transfer window opened.)	CM	(Scotland) David Watson	(Scotland) Kilmarnock	Undisclosed	
1 July 2026 (Note: The transfer was announced on 10 June, and would become official on 1 July once his Rangers contract expired.)	CB	(England) Ben Davies	(Scotland) Rangers	Free	
1 July 2026	LB	(England) Akin Famewo	(England) Hull City	Undisclosed	
2 July 2026	RB	(England) Luca Stephenson	(England) Liverpool	£700,000	
23 July 2026	RB	(Spain) Gaizka Larrazabal	(Portugal) Casa Pia	Free	
4 August 2026	CF	(England) Tom King (Note: Signed initially for the U21s)	(England) Cheltenham Town	Free	
4 August 2026	RB	(England) Finn Wilkinson	(England) Blackburn Rovers	Free	
12 August 2026	CB	(England) Lewis Brunt	(Wales) Wrexham	Undisclosed	
17 August 2026	CB	(England) Charlie Paye	(England) Cray Wanderers	Undisclosed	
26 August 2026	LW	(Canada) Jayden Nelson	(United States) Austin FC	Undisclosed (Note: The transfer was reported to be around $1,100,000 by Austin FC, and may reach $2,325,000 with performance related add-ons.)	
28 August 2026	GK	(Republic of Ireland) Gavin Bazunu	(England) Southampton	Undisclosed	
28 August 2026	CM	(Japan) Atsuki Itō	(Belgium) Gent	Undisclosed	

=== Out ===
Date	Pos.	Player	To	Fee	Ref.
15 June 2026 (Note: The transfer was announced on 27 May, and would become official on 15 June once the transfer window opened)	LW	(Hungary) Szabolcs Schön	(Hungary) Győri ETO	Undisclosed	
19 June 2026	CM	(Egypt) Sonny Sharples-Ahmed	(England) Hednesford Town	Undisclosed	
3 August 2026	CF	(England) David Abimbola	(England) Hednesford Town	Undisclosed	
21 August 2026	LB	(England) Ajay Weston	(England) Leamington	Free transfer	
18 November 2026	GK	(England) Luke Hutchinson	(England) Harrogate Town	Undisclosed	

=== Loaned in ===
Date	Pos.	Player	From	Date until	Ref.
7 July 2026	RW	(France) Kyliane Dong	(Germany) FC Augsburg	End of Season (Note: A view to make the move permanent at the conclusion of the loan deal.)	
11 August 2026	CF	(Scotland) Ryan Hardie	(Wales) Wrexham	End of Season	
14 August 2026	RW	(England) Samuel Iling-Junior	(England) Aston Villa	End of Season	
1 September 2026	CF	(Canada) Theo Bair	(France) Auxerre	End of Season (Note: Option to make the move permanent.)	

=== Loaned out ===
Date	Pos.	Player	To	Loaned until	Ref.
25 July 2026	CB	(England) Richard Taylor	(England) Bromley	End of Season	
3 August 2026	CB	(Northern Ireland) Sam Inwood	(England) Swindon Town	End of Season	
6 August 2026	CB	(Republic of Ireland) Lewis Temple	(England) Oldham Athletic	End of Season	
31 August 2026	RW	(England) Charlie Warren	(England) Accrington Stanley	End of Season	
2 September 2026	CAM	(England) Joel Randall	(England) Chesterfield	End of Season	
5 September 2026	GK	(Republic of Ireland) David Harrington	(England) Grimsby Town	19 September 2026 (Note: Seven day emergency loan. On 11 September, it was extended for another seven days.)	
7 September 2026	GK	(England) Luke Hutchinson	(England) Harrogate Town	18 November 2026 (Note: On 18 November Hutchinson completed a permanent transfer to Harrogate.)	
23 October 2026	CM	(England) Lucas Kirkpatrick	(England) FC United of Manchester	23 November 2026	
26 October 2026	CDM	(England) Harry Leigh	(England) Ashton United	23 November 2026	
31 October 2026	CF	(England) Daniel Ogboru (Note: U18s player)	(England) Euxton Villa	30 November 2026	
31 October 2026	CB	(England) Charlie Quirk	(England) Euxton Villa	30 November 2026	

=== Released / Out of Contract ===
Date	Pos.	Player	Subsequent club	Joined date	Ref.
30 June 2026	CM	(England) Kyle Dempsey	(England) Port Vale	1 July 2026	
30 June 2026	CF	(Republic of Ireland) Mark Isong	(United States) Vermont Catamounts	1 July 2026	
30 June 2026	CB	(Scotland) George Johnston	(England) Luton Town	1 July 2026	
30 June 2026	RB	(England) Jordi Osei-Tutu	(England) Millwall	21 August 2026	
30 June 2026	CB	(England) Oliver Smith	(England) Accrington Stanley	10 September 2026	
30 June 2026	CB	(England) Jamie Grayson	(United States) South Carolina Gamecocks		
30 June 2026	LB	(Nigeria) Tomi Adesina	(England) Litherland REMYCA	16 October 2026	
30 June 2026	GK	(Scotland) Jack Dallimore			
30 June 2026	CB	(England) Sean Hogan			
30 June 2026	RW	(Guinea-Bissau) Carlos Mendes Gomes			
28 August 2026	RB	(England) Cyrus Christie	(Vietnam) Hanoi FC	1 September 2026	

=== New Contract ===
Date	Pos.	Player	End date	Ref.
20 August 2026	CAM	(Portugal) Rúben Rodrigues	30 June 2028	
31 August 2026	RW	(England) Charlie Warren	30 June 2028 (Note: Option for a further year)	
18 September 2026	GK	(Republic of Ireland) Jack Bonham	30 June 2028	

== Pre-season and friendlies ==
On 28 April, Bolton announced NAC Breda would visit the Toughsheet Community Stadium during pre-season and a trip to Slovakia for a training camp with a friendly against DAC Dunajská Streda. On 3 June, an away friendly at Fleetwood Town on 28 July was announced. Five days later, a fourth was added to the schedule at Oldham Athletic. On 17 June, a second home pre-season friendly was added against Everton.

Win Draw Loss Fixtures

11 July 2026 Friendly	Longridge Town	0–4	Bolton Wanderers U21	Longridge
15:00 BST		Report	Trialist A 5'; O'Neill 12'; Abimbola 23'; Trialist B 68'	Stadium: Inglewhite Road

17 July 2026 Friendly	DAC Dunajská Streda	2–1	Bolton Wanderers	Dunajská Streda, Slovakia
18:30 CEST	Gagua 18'; Kapanadze 38'	Report	Rodrigues 76'	Stadium: MOL Aréna

18 July 2026 Friendly	Daisy Hill	1–2	Bolton Wanderers U21	Daisy Hill
15:00 BST	Musanhu 20'	Report	Lawrence 51' (pen.); Trialist 90'	Stadium: Ginge Power Stadium

21 July 2026 Friendly	Oldham Athletic	1−3	Bolton Wanderers	Oldham
19:00 BST	Kavanagh 82'	Report	Rodrigues 12', 23'; McAtee 86'	Stadium: Boundary Park; Referee: Matt McQuillan

25 July 2026 Friendly	Bolton Wanderers	0–0	Everton	Bolton
15:00 BST		Report		Stadium: Toughsheet Community Stadium; Attendance: 10,608; Referee: James Bell

28 July 2026 Friendly	Fleetwood Town	1–1	Bolton Wanderers	Fleetwood
19:00 BST	Evans 51'	Report	Gale 85'	Stadium: Highbury Stadium; Attendance: 2,134; Referee: Paul Tierney

28 July 2026 Friendly	Radcliffe	0–2	Bolton Wanderers U21	Radcliffe
19:45 BST		Report	Leigh 12'; Trialist 49'	Stadium: Neuven Stadium

1 August 2026 Friendly	Bolton Wanderers	1–0	NAC Breda	Bolton
15:00 BST	Rodrigues 18'	Report		Stadium: Toughsheet Community Stadium; Attendance: 4,989; Referee: Matthew Donohue

4 August 2026 Friendly	Bolton Wanderers	2–4	Everton U21	Bolton
	Christie 14'; Watson	Report	Loney 7'; Brookes 67'; Catesby 77'; Moses 85'	Stadium: Eddie Davies Academy (Behind-closed-doors)

== Competitions ==
=== Overall record ===
Competition	First match	Last match	Starting round	Final position	Record							
Competition	First match	Last match	Starting round	Final position	Pld	W	D	L	GF	GA	GD	Win %
Championship	15 August 2026	1 May 2027	Matchday 1	TBD	16	5	3	8	21	30	−9	31.25
FA Cup	January 2027	TBD	Third round	TBD	0	0	0	0	0	0	+0	—
EFL Cup	8 August 2026	8 August 2026	First round	First round	1	0	0	1	0	1	−1	0.00
Total					17	5	3	9	21	31	−10	29.41

Last updated: 21 November 2026
Source: Soccerway

=== Championship ===
==== League table ====
Pos	Team	Pld	W	D	L	GF	GA	GD	Pts
15	Cardiff City	16	4	6	6	28	29	−1	18
16	Millwall	16	5	3	8	23	28	−5	18
17	Bolton Wanderers	16	5	3	8	21	30	−9	18
18	Bristol City	16	5	3	8	16	26	−10	18
19	Charlton Athletic	16	4	5	7	14	25	−11	17

Updated to match(es) played on 21 November 2026. Source: EFL Official Website
Rules for classification: 1) Points; 2) Goal difference; 3) Number of goals scored; 4) Head-to-head results; 5) Wins; 6) Away goals; 7) Penalty points (sec 9.5); 8) Number of 12-point sending off offences; 9) Play-off (only if needed to determine promotion/relegation)

==== Results summary ====
Overall								Home						Away					
Pld	W	D	L	GF	GA	GD	Pts	W	D	L	GF	GA	GD	W	D	L	GF	GA	GD
16	5	3	8	21	30	−9	18	2	1	5	10	16	−6	3	2	3	11	14	−3

Last updated: 21 November 2026.
Source: Soccerway

==== Results by round ====
Round	1	2	3	4	5	6	7	8	9	10	11	12	13	14	15	16	17	18	19	20	21	22	23	24	25	26	27	28	29	30	31	32	33	34	35	36	37	38	39	40	41	42	43	44	45	46	47
Ground	H	A	H	A	A	H	H	A	H	A	A	H	H	A	A	H	H	A	H	A	H	A	H	A	A	H	A	H	H	A	A	H	H	A	H	A	H	A	A	H	A	H	A	H	H	A	H
Result	W	D	L	L	L	L	W	W	L	W	D	L	L	W	L	D																															
Position	5	8	11	14	21	21	20	15	17	14	15	18	19	17	18	17																															
Points	3	4	4	4	4	4	7	10	10	13	14	14	14	17	17	18																															

Source: Soccerway
W = Win; D = Draw; L = Loss; P = Postponed

==== Matches ====
On 25 June, the Championship fixtures were announced. It sees Bolton open their campaign on 8 August at home to Preston North End, with the regular season concluding on 1 May away at West Bromwich Albion.

Win Draw Loss Fixtures

15 August 2026 1	Bolton Wanderers	2–1	Preston North End	Bolton
12:30 BST	Dalby 15'; Gale 25'; Sheehan (yellow card) 48'; Forino-Joseph (yellow card) 88'	Report	McCann (yellow card) 13'; Thompson (yellow card) 27'; Valentín (yellow card) 42'; Erabi 86'	Stadium: Toughsheet Community Stadium; Attendance: 26,262; Referee: Adam Herczeg

22 August 2026 2	Queens Park Rangers	0–0	Bolton Wanderers	Shepherd's Bush, London
15:00 BST	Clarke-Salter (yellow card) 75'	Report	Gale (yellow card) 45+1'; Hardie (yellow card) 73'	Stadium: Loftus Road; Attendance: 17,402; Referee: Edward Duckworth

29 August 2026 3	Bolton Wanderers	0–1	Lincoln City	Bolton
15:00 BST		Report	House (yellow card) 30', (goal) 66'; Varfolomeyev (yellow card) 79'; McGrandles (yellow card) 90+3'	Stadium: Toughsheet Community Stadium; Attendance: 21,581; Referee: Ben Speedie

1 September 2026 4	Sheffield United	3–2	Bolton Wanderers	Sheffield
19:45 BST	Tanganga 4'; Bamford 68'; Donovan 90+3'	Report	Simons 1'; Larrazabal (yellow card) 39'; McAtee (yellow card) 49'; Dalby 67'	Stadium: Bramall Lane; Attendance: 25,714; Referee: Tony Harrington

5 September 2026 5	Millwall	4–0	Bolton Wanderers	Bermondsey, London
15:00 BST	Taylor 38'; Dykes 83', 88'; Metcalfe (red card) 86'; Neghli 90+1'	Report	Famewo (yellow card) 75'; Sheehan (red card) 86'	Stadium: The Den; Attendance: 19,012; Referee: Will Finnie

8 September 2026 6	Bolton Wanderers	2–3	West Ham United	Bolton
20:00 BST	Erhahon 18'; Rodrigues 27' (pen.)	Report	Scarles (yellow card) 7'; Bowen 13', 77'; Mavropanos 31', (yellow card) 62'	Stadium: Toughsheet Community Stadium; Attendance: 25,510; Referee: David Webb
Note: Fixture was initially scheduled for a 19:45 kick-off, but was pushed back for live Sky Sports broadcasting.

12 September 2026 7	Bolton Wanderers	1–0	Cardiff City	Bolton
12:30 BST	Davies (yellow card) 31'; Dong (yellow card) 32'; Iling-Junior (yellow card) 37'; Nelson (yellow card) 78'; Gale 90', (yellow card) 90+1'	Report	Colwill (yellow card) 42'; Ng (yellow card) 54'	Stadium: Toughsheet Community Stadium; Attendance: 21,543; Referee: Thomas Parsons
Note: Fixture was initially scheduled for a 15:00 kick-off, but was brought forward for live Sky Sports broadcasting.

20 September 2026 8	Norwich City	3–4	Bolton Wanderers	Norwich
13:30 BST	Touré 5'; McConville 19'; Stacey 61'	Report	Gale 8'; Larrazabal 42'; Dalby 47'; Itō 72'	Stadium: Carrow Road; Attendance: 25,832; Referee: Tom Nield
Note: Fixture was initially scheduled for 19 September, but was pushed back a day due to Norwich's EFL Cup involvements on the preceding Thursday.

10 October 2026 9	Bolton Wanderers	1–2	Stoke City	Bolton
15:00 BST	Conway (yellow card) 72'; Bair 90+2'	Report	Talovierov (red card) 20'; McGlynn (yellow card) 34'; Cissé 45+4'; Wilmot 62'	Stadium: Toughsheet Community Stadium; Attendance: 26,018; Referee: Thomas Kirk

13 October 2026 10	Wolverhampton Wanderers	1–3	Bolton Wanderers	Wolverhampton
19:45 BST	Mané (yellow card) 26'; Bellegarde 50'; Trippier (yellow card) 89'; Neave (yellow card) 90+3'	Report	Itō 28'; Larrazabal (yellow card) 45+1'; Dalby 72'; Erhahon (yellow card) 76'; Sheehan 82'	Stadium: Molineux Stadium; Attendance: 28,730; Referee: Tim Robinson

17 October 2026 11	Southampton	0–0	Bolton Wanderers	Southampton
15:00 BST	Bragg (yellow card) 59'; Matsuki (yellow card) 85'	Report	Famewo (yellow card) 44'; Brunt (yellow card) 76'; Bair (yellow card) 83'; Stephenson (yellow card) 88'	Stadium: St Mary's Stadium; Attendance: 29,634; Referee: Matt Donohue

23 October 2026 12	Bolton Wanderers	1–5	Middlesbrough	Bolton
20:00 BST	Bair 45+2'; Sheehan (yellow card) 68'	Report	Morris 13'; Lankshear 31', 78'; Brunt 39' (o.g.); Cozier-Duberry 73'	Stadium: Toughsheet Community Stadium; Attendance: 26,257; Referee: Simon Hooper
Note: Fixture was initially scheduled for 24 October, but was brought forward to the night prior for live Sky Sports broadcasting.

31 October 2026 13	Bolton Wanderers	2–3	Bristol City	Bolton
15:00 GMT	Sheehan 16', (yellow card) 30'; Dalby 57'	Report	Williams (yellow card) 11'; Ballard 13'; Bell 84'; Twine 90+3'	Stadium: Toughsheet Community Stadium; Attendance: 21,706; Referee: Bobby Madley

3 November 2026 14	Charlton Athletic	0–1	Bolton Wanderers	Charlton, London
19:45 GMT	Knibbs (yellow card) 20'	Report	Dalby 18'; Rodrigues (yellow card) 75'	Stadium: The Valley; Attendance: 14,885; Referee: Steve Martin
Note: Fixture was initially scheduled 4 November, but was brought forward to the night prior due to matchday 15 being moved to the following Friday.

6 November 2026 15	Derby County	3–1	Bolton Wanderers	Derby
20:00 GMT	Nyambe 46'; Robinson 49'; Brewster 90+4', (yellow card) 90+4'	Report	Rodrigues 42'; Stephenson (yellow card) 62'; Larrazabal (yellow card) 90+5'	Stadium: Pride Park Stadium; Attendance: 27,536; Referee: James Bell
Note: Fixture was initially scheduled for 7 November, but was brought forward to the night prior for live Sky Sports broadcasting.

21 November 2026 16	Bolton Wanderers	1–1	Portsmouth	Bolton
15:00 GMT	Dalby 12'; Sheehan (yellow card) 43'; Stephenson (yellow card) 68'	Report	Murphy 7'; Kamara (yellow card) 29'; Meghoma (yellow card) 69'	Stadium: Toughsheet Community Stadium; Attendance: 22,791; Referee: Tom Reeves

25 November 2026 17	Bolton Wanderers	v	West Bromwich Albion	Bolton
19:45 GMT				Stadium: Toughsheet Community Stadium

28 November 2026 18	Birmingham City	v	Bolton Wanderers	Birmingham
15:00 GMT				Stadium: St Andrew's

5 December 2026 19	Bolton Wanderers	v	Blackburn Rovers	Bolton
12:30 GMT				Stadium: Toughsheet Community Stadium
Note: Fixture was initially scheduled for a 15:00 kick-off, but was brought forward for live Sky Sports broadcasting.

8 December 2026 20	Swansea City	v	Bolton Wanderers	Swansea
19:45 GMT				Stadium: Swansea.com Stadium

11 December 2026 21	Bolton Wanderers	v	Wrexham	Bolton
20:00 GMT				Stadium: Toughsheet Community Stadium
Note: Fixture was initially scheduled for 12 December, but was brought forward to the night prior for live Sky Sports broadcasting.

19 December 2026 22	Watford	v	Bolton Wanderers	Watford
12:30 GMT				Stadium: Vicarage Road
Note: Fixture was initially scheduled for a 15:00 kick-off, but was brought forward for live Sky Sports broadcasting.

26 December 2026 23	Bolton Wanderers	v	Burnley	Bolton
12:30 GMT				Stadium: Toughsheet Community Stadium
Note: Fixture was initially scheduled for a 15:00 kick-off, but was brought forward following advice from local police.

29 December 2026 24	Middlesbrough	v	Bolton Wanderers	Middlesbrough
19:45 GMT				Stadium: Riverside Stadium

1 January 2027 25	Wrexham	v	Bolton Wanderers	Wrexham
15:00 GMT				Stadium: Racecourse Ground

16 January 2027 26	Bolton Wanderers	v	Southampton	Bolton
15:00 GMT				Stadium: Toughsheet Community Stadium

23 January 2027 27	Bristol City	v	Bolton Wanderers	Bristol
15:00 GMT				Stadium: Ashton Gate

26 January 2027 28	Bolton Wanderers	v	Charlton Athletic	Bolton
19:45 GMT				Stadium: Toughsheet Community Stadium

30 January 2027 29	Bolton Wanderers	v	Derby County	Bolton
12:30 GMT				Stadium: Toughsheet Community Stadium
Note: Fixture was initially scheduled for a 15:00 kick-off, but was brought forward for live Sky Sports broadcasting.

6 February 2027 30	Portsmouth	v	Bolton Wanderers	Portsmouth
15:00 GMT				Stadium: Fratton Park

14 February 2027 31	Cardiff City	v	Bolton Wanderers	Cardiff
12:00 GMT				Stadium: Cardiff City Stadium
Note: Fixture was initially scheduled for 13 February, but was pushed back a day for live Sky Sports broadcasting.

17 February 2027 32	Bolton Wanderers	v	Wolverhampton Wanderers	Bolton
19:45 GMT				Stadium: Toughsheet Community Stadium

20 February 2027 33	Bolton Wanderers	v	Norwich City	Bolton
15:00 GMT				Stadium: Toughsheet Community Stadium

27 February 2027 34	Stoke City	v	Bolton Wanderers	Stoke-on-Trent
15:00 GMT				Stadium: Bet365 Stadium

2 March 2027 35	Bolton Wanderers	v	Queens Park Rangers	Bolton
19:45 GMT				Stadium: Toughsheet Community Stadium

6 March 2027 36	Preston North End	v	Bolton Wanderers	Preston
15:00 GMT				Stadium: Deepdale

13 March 2027 37	Bolton Wanderers	v	Birmingham City	Bolton
15:00 GMT				Stadium: Toughsheet Community Stadium

17 March 2027 38	Blackburn Rovers	v	Bolton Wanderers	Blackburn
19:45 GMT				Stadium: Ewood Park

20 March 2027 39	Burnley	v	Bolton Wanderers	Burnley
15:00 GMT				Stadium: Turf Moor

3 April 2027 40	Bolton Wanderers	v	Watford	Bolton
15:00 BST				Stadium: Toughsheet Community Stadium

6 April 2027 41	West Ham United	v	Bolton Wanderers	Stratford, London
19:45 BST				Stadium: London Stadium

10 April 2027 42	Bolton Wanderers	v	Millwall	Bolton
15:00 BST				Stadium: Toughsheet Community Stadium

17 April 2027 43	Lincoln City	v	Bolton Wanderers	Lincoln
15:00 BST				Stadium: LNER Stadium

20 April 2027 44	Bolton Wanderers	v	Sheffield United	Bolton
19:45 BST				Stadium: Toughsheet Community Stadium

24 April 2027 45	Bolton Wanderers	v	Swansea City	Bolton
15:00 BST				Stadium: Toughsheet Community Stadium

1 May 2027 46	West Bromwich Albion	v	Bolton Wanderers	West Bromwich
12:30 BST				Stadium: The Hawthorns

=== FA Cup ===
Win Draw Loss Fixtures

TBD vs TBD Date: TBD 2026-2027

=== EFL Cup ===
On 25 June, the draw for the first round was made, with Bolton being draw away at Sheffield Wednesday.

Win Draw Loss Fixtures

8 August 2026 First round	Sheffield Wednesday	1–0	Bolton Wanderers	Sheffield
15:00 BST	Lowe 70'	Report	Famewo (yellow card) 37'; Simons (red card) 56'; Stephenson (yellow card) 83'	Stadium: Hillsborough Stadium; Attendance: 15,834; Referee: Elliot Bell

== Statistics ==
=== Appearances and goals ===
As of 21 November 2026

Players with no appearances are not included on the list; italics indicate loaned in player

No.	Pos	Nat	Player	Total		Championship		FA Cup		EFL Cup	
No.	Pos	Nat	Player	Apps	Goals	Apps	Goals	Apps	Goals	Apps	Goals
1	GK	(Republic of Ireland) IRL	Jack Bonham	9	0	8+0	0	0+0	0	1+0	0
3	DF	(Saint Lucia) LCA	Chris Forino-Joseph	11	0	9+1	0	0+0	0	1+0	0
4	MF	(England) ENG	Xavier Simons	11	1	7+3	1	0+0	0	1+0	0
5	DF	(England) ENG	Lewis Brunt	10	0	7+3	0	0+0	0	0+0	0
6	DF	(England) ENG	Ben Davies	9	0	6+2	0	0+0	0	1+0	0
7	FW	(France) FRA	Kyliane Dong	13	0	5+7	0	0+0	0	0+1	0
8	MF	(Wales) WAL	Josh Sheehan	17	1	16+0	1	0+0	0	1+0	0
9	FW	(Canada) CAN	Theo Bair	8	2	2+6	2	0+0	0	0+0	0
10	FW	(England) ENG	Sam Dalby	17	7	14+2	7	0+0	0	1+0	0
11	FW	(Barbados) BRB	Thierry Gale	17	3	12+4	3	0+0	0	1+0	0
12	MF	(Scotland) SCO	David Watson	2	0	0+1	0	0+0	0	0+1	0
14	DF	(England) ENG	Akin Famewo	13	0	11+1	0	0+0	0	1+0	0
16	FW	(England) ENG	Samuel Iling-Junior	15	0	9+6	0	0+0	0	0+0	0
17	MF	(Japan) JPN	Atsuki Itō	10	2	4+6	2	0+0	0	0+0	0
18	DF	(Northern Ireland) NIR	Eoin Toal	9	0	7+1	0	0+0	0	0+1	0
20	MF	(Portugal) POR	Rúben Rodrigues	14	2	7+6	2	0+0	0	1+0	0
21	MF	(Scotland) SCO	Ethan Erhahon	11	1	9+2	1	0+0	0	0+0	0
22	DF	(Spain) ESP	Gaizka Larrazabal	16	1	13+2	1	0+0	0	1+0	0
25	DF	(England) ENG	Max Conway	16	0	11+4	0	0+0	0	0+1	0
26	FW	(Canada) CAN	Jayden Nelson	6	0	0+6	0	0+0	0	0+0	0
27	DF	(England) ENG	Luca Stephenson	6	0	5+0	0	0+0	0	1+0	0
31	GK	(Republic of Ireland) IRL	Gavin Bazunu	8	0	8+0	0	0+0	0	0+0	0
35	MF	(England) ENG	Max Lott	4	0	1+3	0	0+0	0	0+0	0
39	FW	(Scotland) SCO	Ryan Hardie	8	0	0+8	0	0+0	0	0+0	0
45	FW	(England) ENG	John McAtee	7	0	5+1	0	0+0	0	0+1	0

=== Goals record ===
As of 21 November 2026

Rank	No.	Nat.	Po.	Name	Championship	FA Cup	EFL Cup	Total
1	10	(England)	CF	Sam Dalby	7	0	0	7
2	11	(Barbados)	LW	Thierry Gale	3	0	0	3
3	8	(Wales)	CM	Josh Sheehan	2	0	0	2
3	9	(Canada)	CF	Theo Bair	2	0	0	2
3	17	(Japan)	CM	Atsuki Itō	2	0	0	2
3	20	(Portugal)	CM	Rúben Rodrigues	2	0	0	2
7	4	(England)	CM	Xavier Simons	1	0	0	1
7	21	(Scotland)	CM	Ethan Erhahon	1	0	0	1
7	22	(Spain)	RB	Gaizka Larrazabal	1	0	0	1
Total					21	0	0	21

=== Disciplinary record ===
As of 21 November 2026

Rank	No.	Nat.	Po.	Name	Championship			FA Cup			EFL Cup			Total		
Rank	No.	Nat.	Po.	Name	Yellow card	(yellow card) (yellow-red card)	Red card	Yellow card	(yellow card) (yellow-red card)	Red card	Yellow card	(yellow card) (yellow-red card)	Red card	Yellow card	(yellow card) (yellow-red card)	Red card
1	8	(Wales)	CM	Josh Sheehan	4	0	1	0	0	0	0	0	0	4	0	1
2	27	(England)	RB	Luca Stephenson	3	0	0	0	0	0	1	0	0	4	0	0
3	4	(England)	CM	Xavier Simons	0	0	0	0	0	0	0	0	1	0	0	1
3	14	(England)	LB	Akin Famewo	2	0	0	0	0	0	1	0	0	3	0	0
3	22	(Spain)	RB	Gaizka Larrazabal	3	0	0	0	0	0	0	0	0	3	0	0
6	11	(Barbados)	LW	Thierry Gale	2	0	0	0	0	0	0	0	0	2	0	0
7	3	(Saint Lucia)	CB	Chris Forino-Joseph	1	0	0	0	0	0	0	0	0	1	0	0
7	5	(England)	CB	Lewis Brunt	1	0	0	0	0	0	0	0	0	1	0	0
7	6	(England)	CB	Ben Davies	1	0	0	0	0	0	0	0	0	1	0	0
7	7	(France)	RW	Kyliane Dong	1	0	0	0	0	0	0	0	0	1	0	0
7	9	(Canada)	CF	Theo Bair	1	0	0	0	0	0	0	0	0	1	0	0
7	16	(England)	RW	Samuel Iling-Junior	1	0	0	0	0	0	0	0	0	1	0	0
7	20	(Portugal)	CM	Rúben Rodrigues	1	0	0	0	0	0	0	0	0	1	0	0
7	21	(Scotland)	CM	Ethan Erhahon	1	0	0	0	0	0	0	0	0	1	0	0
7	25	(England)	LB	Max Conway	1	0	0	0	0	0	0	0	0	1	0	0
7	26	(Canada)	LW	Jayden Nelson	1	0	0	0	0	0	0	0	0	1	0	0
7	39	(Scotland)	CF	Ryan Hardie	1	0	0	0	0	0	0	0	0	1	0	0
7	45	(England)	CF	John McAtee	1	0	0	0	0	0	0	0	0	1	0	0
Total					26	0	1	0	0	0	2	0	1	28	0	2
