= Josu Etxaniz =

Spanish footballer

Personal information
- Full name: Josu Etxaniz Irazabal
- Date of birth: 6 December 1985 (age 40)
- Place of birth: Elgeta, Spain
- Height: 1.84 m (6 ft 1/2 in)
- Position: Centre back

Youth career
- Urko
- Eibar

Senior career*
Years	Team	Apps	(Gls)
2004–2007	Eibar B		
2007–2012	Eibar	30	(0)
2007–2008	→ Barakaldo (loan)	26	(1)
2009	→ Barakaldo (loan)	14	(1)
2010–2011	→ Zamora (loan)	29	(0)
2012	Lemona	13	(0)
2012–2016	Portugalete	116	(8)
2016–2018	Zamudio	23	(0)
- * Club domestic league appearances and goals

Josu Etxaniz Irazabal (born 6 December 1985) is a Spanish former footballer who played as a central defender.
