= Josué Dorrio =

Spanish footballer

Personal information
- Full name: Josué Dorrio Ortega
- Date of birth: 3 March 1994 (age 32)
- Place of birth: Bilbao, Spain
- Height: 1.70 m (5 ft 7 in)
- Position: Winger

Youth career
- 2001–2004: Santutxu
- 2004–2008: Athletic Bilbao
- 2008–2013: Danok Bat

Senior career*
Years	Team	Apps	(Gls)
2013–2016	Bermeo	98	(11)
2016–2017	Vitoria	30	(3)
2017	Eibar	0	(0)
2017–2018	Portugalete	24	(5)
2018–2019	Lorca	20	(5)
2019–2020	Murcia	22	(2)
2020–2021	Talavera	22	(0)
2021–2022	Linense	33	(2)
2022–2024	Amorebieta	79	(4)
2024–2025	Racing Ferrol	40	(2)
2025–2026	Málaga	15	(0)
- * Club domestic league appearances and goals as of 3 June 2026

Josué Dorrio Ortega (born 3 March 1994) is a Spanish footballer who plays as a winger.

== Club career ==
Born in Bilbao, Biscay, Basque Country, Dorrio joined Athletic Bilbao's youth setup in 2004 from Santutxu FC. Released in 2008, he subsequently completed his formation with Danok Bat CF before joining Tercera División side Bermeo FT in 2013.

In July 2016 Dorrio moved to SD Eibar, being assigned to the farm team also in the fourth tier. He made his first team debut the following 25 January, starting in a 2–2 Copa del Rey home draw against Atlético Madrid.

On 2 September 2019, after spending two years with the fourth division sides Club Portugalete and Lorca FC, Dorrio joined Real Murcia in Segunda División B.

On 28 September 2020, Dorrio was announced at fellow third division side CF Talavera de la Reina. He moved to Primera División RFEF side Real Balompédica Linense the following 5 July, before signing for SD Amorebieta in the same category on 19 July 2022; with the latter side he achieved promotion to Segunda División in 2023.

Dorrio scored his first professional goal on 8 October 2023, netting the opener in a 2–1 home loss to former side Eibar. On 12 July 2024, after suffering relegation with Amore, he joined Racing de Ferrol in the second division.

On 28 August 2025, after another relegation, Dorrio moved to Málaga CF on a one-year deal.
