= Atsuki Itō =

Japanese footballer (born 1998)

Atsuki Itō 伊藤 敦樹
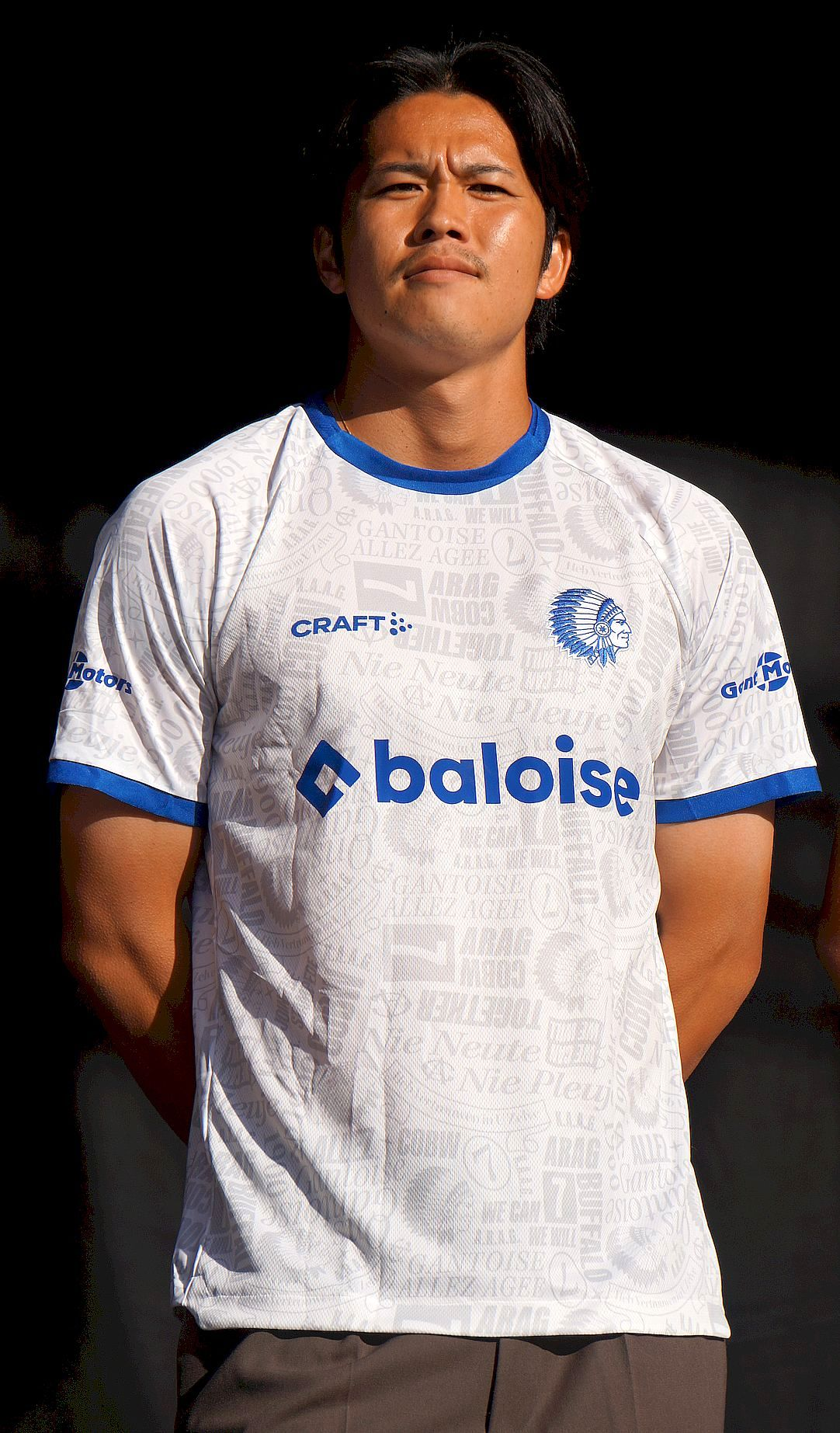

Personal information
- Full name: Atsuki Itō
- Date of birth: 11 August 1998 (age 28)
- Place of birth: Urawa (Now Midori-ku, part of Saitama City), Saitama, Japan
- Height: 1.85 m (6 ft 1 in)
- Position: Defensive midfielder

Team information
- Current team: Bolton Wanderers
- Number: 17

Youth career
- –2016: Urawa Red Diamonds

College career
Years	Team	Apps	(Gls)
2017–2020	Ryutsu Keizai University		

Senior career*
Years	Team	Apps	(Gls)
2021–2024	Urawa Red Diamonds	121	(12)
2024–2026	Gent	65	(6)
2026–	Bolton Wanderers	4	(2)

International career^{‡}
2023–	Japan	3	(1)
- * Club domestic league appearances and goals as of 02:59, 14 October 2026 (UTC) ‡ National team caps and goals as of 13 October 2024

Atsuki Itō (伊藤 敦樹, Itō Atsuki; born 11 August 1998) is a Japanese footballer who plays as a defensive midfielder or a centre back for EFL Championship club Bolton Wanderers and the Japan national team.

== Club career ==
Itō played over 100 games for Urawa Red Diamonds, being named in the 2023 J1 League Team of the Season.

On 13 August 2024, Itō signed a four-year contract with Gent in Belgium.

On 28 August 2026, Itō joined EFL Championship club Bolton Wanderers for an undisclosed fee.

== Career statistics ==
=== Club ===
As of match played 13 October 2026

Club	Season	League			National cup (Note: Includes Emperor's Cup, Belgian Cup, FA Cup)		League cup (Note: Includes J.League Cup, EFL Cup)		Other		Total	
Club	Season	Division	Apps	Goals	Apps	Goals	Apps	Goals	Apps	Goals	Apps	Goals
Ryutsu Keizai University	2018	–			1	0	–		0	0	1	0
Ryutsu Keizai University	2019	–			2	0	–		0	0	2	0
Ryutsu Keizai University	Total		0	0	3	0	0	0	0	0	3	0
Urawa Red Diamonds	2021	J1 League	36	1	5	0	12	2	0	0	0	3
Urawa Red Diamonds	2022	J1 League	28	4	2	0	4	2	8 (Note: 7 Appearances in the AFC Champions League) (Note: 1 Appearance in the Japanese Super Cup)	0	0	6
Urawa Red Diamonds	2023	J1 League	33	2	3	2	6	0	0	0	42	4
Urawa Red Diamonds	2024	J1 League	24	5	0	0	2	1	8	0	34	6
Urawa Red Diamonds	Total		121	12	10	2	24	5	16	0	171	19
Gent	2024–25	Belgian Pro League	35	2	2	0	—		9 (Note: Appearances in UEFA Conference League)	0	47	2
Gent	2025–26	Belgian Pro League	30	4	3	1	—		—		32	5
Gent	Total		65	6	5	1	—		9	0	79	7
Bolton Wanderers	2026–27	EFL Championship	4	2	0	0	—		—		4	2
Career total			190	20	18	3	26	5	23	0	256	28

=== International ===
As of match played 13 October 2023

Appearances and goals by national team and year
National team	Year	Apps	Goals
Japan	2023	3	1
Total		3	1

Scores and results list Japan's goal tally first, score column indicates score after each Itō goal.

List of international goals scored by Atsuki Itō
No.	Date	Venue	Opponent	Score	Result	Competition
1	12 September 2023	Cegeka Arena, Genk, Belgium	Turkey	1–0	4–2	2023 Kirin Challenge Cup

== Honours ==
=== Club ===
Urawa Red Diamonds

- Emperor's Cup: 2021
- Japanese Super Cup: 2022
- AFC Champions League: 2022

=== Individual ===
- J.League Best XI: 2023
