= Aitor Aldalur =

Spanish footballer (born 1991)

Personal information
- Full name: Aitor Aldalur Agirrezabala
- Date of birth: 26 December 1991 (age 34)
- Place of birth: Tolosa, Spain
- Height: 1.78 m (5 ft 10 in)
- Positions: Defensive midfielder; centre back; right back

Team information
- Current team: Sha Tin
- Number: 77

Youth career
- Real Sociedad

Senior career*
Years	Team	Apps	(Gls)
2010–2011	Real Sociedad B	13	(0)
2011–2013	Amorebieta	63	(1)
2013–2014	Lleida Esportiu	29	(0)
2014–2015	Barakaldo	29	(0)
2015–2017	Leioa	65	(2)
2017–2018	Racing Ferrol	15	(0)
2018	Toledo	6	(0)
2018–2019	Burgos	24	(0)
2019–2022	Amorebieta	59	(2)
2022–2024	Rayo Majadahonda	25	(0)
2024–2026	Malappuram	20	(4)
2026	Mochudi Centre Chiefs	13	(3)
2026–	Sha Tin	4	(0)
- * Club domestic league appearances and goals as of 22 November 2026

Aitor Aldalur Agirrezabala (born 26 December 1991) is a Spanish professional footballer who currently plays as a defensive midfielder or a full back for Hong Kong Premier League club Sha Tin.

== Club career ==
Born in Tolosa, Gipuzkoa, Basque Country, Aldalur was a Real Sociedad youth graduate. He made his senior debut with the reserves in the 2009–10 campaign, achieving promotion from Tercera División.

In 2011, after featuring sparingly for Sanse, Aldalur moved to Segunda División B side SD Amorebieta. He left the club in 2013, and subsequently represented fellow league teams Lleida Esportiu, Barakaldo CF, SD Leioa, Racing de Ferrol, CD Toledo and Burgos CF before returning to the Azules in August 2019.

Aldalur was a regular starter for Amorebieta during the 2020–21 season, as his side achieved a first-ever promotion to Segunda División. He made his professional debut at the age of 29 on 16 October 2021, coming on as a late substitute for Gaizka Larrazabal in a 2–3 home loss against FC Cartagena.

In September 2026, Aldalur joined Hong Kong Premier League club Sha Tin.
