= Andoni López =

Spanish footballer (born 1996)

Personal information
- Full name: Andoni López Saratxo
- Date of birth: 5 April 1996 (age 30)
- Place of birth: Barakaldo, Spain
- Height: 1.87 m (6 ft 2 in)
- Position: Left-back

Team information
- Current team: Andorra
- Number: 18

Youth career
- 2006–2010: Athletic Bilbao
- 2010–2012: Danok Bat
- 2012–2014: Athletic Bilbao

Senior career*
| Years | Team | Apps | (Gls) |
| 2014–2016 | Basconia | 51 | (4) |
| 2016–2018 | Bilbao Athletic | 70 | (0) |
| 2018–2020 | Athletic Bilbao | 1 | (0) |
| 2018–2019 | → Almería (loan) | 18 | (1) |
| 2019–2020 | → Elche (loan) | 19 | (0) |
| 2020–2022 | Logroñés | 31 | (0) |
| 2022 | Amorebieta | 13 | (0) |
| 2022–2023 | Tenerife | 2 | (0) |
| 2023 | Lugo | 16 | (0) |
| 2023–2026 | Ponferradina | 84 | (5) |
| 2026– | Andorra | 0 | (0) |
- * Club domestic league appearances and goals as of 25 May 2026

Andoni López Saratxo (Basque pronunciation: [andoni lopes̻]; Spanish pronunciation: [anˈdoni ˈlopeθ]; born 5 April 1996) is a Spanish professional footballer who plays as a left-back for Segunda División club FC Andorra.

== Club career ==
Born in Barakaldo, López graduated from the Athletic Bilbao academy in 2014, having joined the Lezama youth setup in 2006. After two seasons with the C-team (during which period he also played in the UEFA Youth League and the Premier League International Cup), he was promoted to the reserves on 7 June 2016. On 22 August, he made his debut in the third tier, playing the whole ninety minutes of a 3–0 victory against UD Socuéllamos.

In February 2018, López was called to the senior squad by manager José Ángel Ziganda for a domestic league fixture against Girona FC as a replacement for the injured Mikel Balenziaga. On 4 February, he made his first team debut in the match, playing the entire ninety minutes and conceding a penalty in the first half of a 2–0 defeat.

On 17 August 2018, López was loaned to Segunda División side UD Almería until the end of the season. He scored his first professional goal on 4 November, netting the winner in a 2–1 home defeat of Sporting de Gijón.

On 7 August 2019, López moved to fellow second division side Elche CF also in a temporary deal. A backup to Juan Cruz, he contributed with 21 appearances overall as his side achieved promotion to La Liga.

On 1 September 2020, López moved to UD Logroñés in the second level on a two-year contract, with Athletic retaining a buy-back clause. On 28 January 2022, he moved to SD Amorebieta.

On 1 September 2022, after suffering relegation, López joined CD Tenerife still in division two, on a one-year contract. After just two league matches, he moved to fellow league team CD Lugo the following 31 January.

On 4 July 2026, López agreed to a one-year deal with FC Andorra in division two.

== Career statistics ==
=== Club ===
As of match played on 19 January 2019

| Club | Season | League | | | Cup | | Other | | Total | |
| Club | Season | Division | Apps | Goals | Apps | Goals | Apps | Goals | Apps | Goals |
|---|---|---|---|---|---|---|---|---|---|---|
| Basconia | 2014–15 | Tercera División | 15 | 0 | — | | — | | 15 | 0 |
| Basconia | 2015–16 | Tercera División | 36 | 4 | — | | — | | 36 | 4 |
| Basconia | Total | | 51 | 4 | — | | — | | 51 | 4 |
| Bilbao Athletic | 2016–17 | Segunda División B | 35 | 0 | — | | — | | 35 | 0 |
| Bilbao Athletic | 2017–18 | Segunda División B | 35 | 0 | — | | 2 | 0 | 37 | 0 |
| Bilbao Athletic | Total | | 70 | 0 | — | | 2 | 0 | 72 | 0 |
| Athletic Bilbao | 2017–18 | La Liga | 1 | 0 | 0 | 0 | 0 | 0 | 1 | 0 |
| Almería (loan) | 2018–19 | Segunda División | 16 | 1 | 0 | 0 | — | | 16 | 1 |
| Career total | | | 138 | 5 | 0 | 0 | 2 | 0 | 140 | 5 |
