= Félix Garreta =

Spanish footballer (born 2004)

Personal information
- Full name: Félix Martí Garreta
- Date of birth: 21 April 2004 (age 22)
- Place of birth: Palau-solità i Plegamans, Spain
- Height: 1.83 m (6 ft 0 in)
- Position: Centre-back

Team information
- Current team: Antequera
- Number: 12

Youth career
- 2008–2012: Palau-solità i Plegamans
- 2012–2014: Espanyol
- 2014–2020: Damm
- 2020–2021: Betis

Senior career*
| Years | Team | Apps | (Gls) |
| 2021–2026 | Betis B | 42 | (1) |
| 2022–2024 | Betis | 1 | (0) |
| 2023–2024 | → Amorebieta (loan) | 31 | (4) |
| 2026– | Antequera | 14 | (0) |
- * Club domestic league appearances and goals as of 10 June 2026

Félix Martí Garreta (born 21 April 2004), sometimes known as just Félix, is a Spanish professional footballer who plays as a centre-back for Primera Federación club Antequera.

== Professional career ==
Born in Palau-solità i Plegamans, Barcelona, Catalonia, Garreta is a youth product of Palau-solità i Plegamans, RCD Espanyol, CF Damm and Real Betis. He began his senior career with the reserves in 2021, and on 28 September 2022 signed a professional contract with the club until 2026.

Garreta made his first team – and La Liga – debut with Betis on 29 December 2022, starting in a 0–0 home draw against Athletic Bilbao. On 4 July 2023, he was loaned to SD Amorebieta in Segunda División for the season.

On 21 January 2026, Garreta moved to Antequera in the third tier.

== Playing style ==
Garreta first played as a winger as a child, before converting to a centre-back. He is a left-footed centre-back, noted for his ball-handling, agility and maturity.
