= Asier Barahona =

Spanish footballer (born 1992)

Personal information
- Full name: Asier Barahona Bregón
- Date of birth: 18 November 1992 (age 33)
- Place of birth: Miranda de Ebro, Spain
- Height: 1.76 m (5 ft 9 1/2 in)
- Position: Forward

Team information
- Current team: La Calzada

Youth career
- 2002–2003: La Charca
- 2003–2009: Mirandés
- 2009–2010: Burgos Promesas

Senior career*
Years	Team	Apps	(Gls)
2010–2015	Mirandés	44	(1)
2010–2011	→ Aurrerá (loan)	20	(1)
2012–2013	→ Alavés (loan)	20	(3)
2015–2016	Getafe B	25	(0)
2016–2017	Extremadura	6	(0)
2017–2018	Zamudio	47	(11)
2018–2019	Arandina	32	(5)
2019–2022	Burgos B	82	(16)
2022–2023	Socuéllamos	29	(1)
2023–2024	Cieza	36	(3)
2024–2026	Varea	60	(19)
2026–	La Calzada	1	(0)
- * Club domestic league appearances and goals as of 21:54, 18 September 2026 (UTC)

Asier Barahona Bregón (born 18 November 1992) is a Spanish footballer who plays as a forward for Tercera Federación club CDFC La Calzada.

== Club career ==
Born in Miranda de Ebro, Province of Burgos, Barahona played youth football with local CD Mirandés. In July 2010 he was loaned to lowly CD Aurrerá de Vitoria, making his senior debut with the latter club in the Tercera División.

Barahona returned to Mirandés the following season, totalling 686 minutes in the Segunda División B as the Castile and León side promoted to Segunda División for the first time ever. He signed a new contract on 14 July 2012, being immediately loaned to Deportivo Alavés of the same league and again achieving promotion, to which he contributed 21 appearances including the playoffs.

On 12 October 2013, Barahona made his professional debut, playing the last 12 minutes in a 2–3 home loss against his previous team Alavés. He scored his only goal in the second tier on 3 January 2015, the last in the 3–1 away win over the same opponents.

Released by Mirandés in June 2015, Barahona resumed his career in the lower leagues.
