= Markel Lozano =

Spanish footballer

Personal information
- Full name: Markel Lozano Llona
- Date of birth: 3 May 1996 (age 30)
- Place of birth: Bilbao, Spain
- Height: 1.89 m (6 ft 2 in)
- Position: Midfielder

Team information
- Current team: Mirandés

Youth career
- Lauro Ikastola
- 2013–2015: Indartsu

Senior career*
| Years | Team | Apps | (Gls) |
| 2015–2018 | Basconia | 31 | (0) |
| 2016–2017 | → Zamudio (loan) | 24 | (0) |
| 2017–2018 | → Arenas Getxo (loan) | 20 | (0) |
| 2018–2019 | Arenas Getxo | 14 | (0) |
| 2019–2020 | Amorebieta | 37 | (0) |
| 2020–2021 | Celta B | 27 | (1) |
| 2021–2022 | Amorebieta | 34 | (0) |
| 2022–2023 | Logroñés | 37 | (0) |
| 2023–2025 | Ponferradina | 69 | (2) |
| 2025–2026 | Zamora | 35 | (2) |
| 2026– | Mirandés | 0 | (0) |
- * Club domestic league appearances and goals as of 25 May 2026

Markel Lozano Llona (born 3 May 1996) is a Spanish footballer who plays as a midfielder for Primera Federación club CD Mirandés.

== Club career ==
Born in Bilbao, Biscay, Basque Country, Lozano played for Lauro Ikastola CF and Indartsu Club as a youth. On 21 May 2015, he agreed to a contract with Athletic Bilbao, and was assigned to the farm team in Tercera División.

On 31 August 2016, Lozano was loaned to Segunda División B side Zamudio SD for the season. On 28 July of the following year, he moved to fellow league team Arenas Club de Getxo also in a temporary deal.

On 26 June 2018, Loazno signed permanently for Arenas as his contract with Athletic was due to expire. The following 21 January, despite being an undisputed starter, he moved to SD Amorebieta also in the third division.

On 30 January 2020, Lozano joined RC Celta de Vigo and was assigned to the reserves, still in division three. In July 2021, he returned to Amorebieta, with the club now in Segunda División.

Lozano made his professional debut on 23 August 2021, starting in a 0–2 away loss against CD Mirandés.
