= Unai Marino =

Spanish footballer

Personal information
- Full name: Unai Marino Alkorta
- Date of birth: 10 December 1999 (age 26)
- Place of birth: Ondarroa, Spain
- Height: 1.85 m (6 ft 1 in)
- Position: Goalkeeper

Team information
- Current team: Alcoyano
- Number: 1

Youth career
- Eibar

Senior career*
Years	Team	Apps	(Gls)
2017–2018	Eibar Urko	1	(0)
2018–2019	Bermeo	15	(0)
2019–2020	Polvorín	6	(0)
2020–2021	Horta	7	(0)
2021–2025	Amorebieta	46	(0)
2025–2026	Unionistas	17	(0)
2026–	Alcoyano	12	(0)
- * Club domestic league appearances and goals as of 7 May 2026

Unai Marino Alkorta (born 10 December 1999) is a Spanish footballer who plays as a goalkeeper for Segunda Federación club Alcoyano.

== Club career ==
Born in Ondarroa, Biscay, Basque Country, Marino finished his formation with SD Eibar, and made his senior debut with the club's second reserve team in the regional leagues in 2017. On 31 May 2018, he moved to Tercera División side Bermeo FT.

In July 2019, Marino signed for another reserve team, Polvorín FC also in the fourth division. After featuring rarely, joined fellow league team UA Horta roughly one year later, but terminated his contract with the club on 27 January 2021.

On 28 January 2021, Marino agreed to a contract with Segunda División B side SD Amorebieta, and was mainly a backup to Mikel Saizar as his side achieved a first-ever promotion to Segunda División at the end of the campaign.

Marino made his professional debut on 20 November 2021, starting in a 0–2 away loss against Real Oviedo.
