= Mikel Saizar =

Spanish footballer (born 1983)

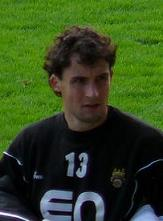
- Saizar with Pontevedra in 2007

Personal information
- Full name: Mikel Saizar Soroa
- Date of birth: 18 January 1983 (age 43)
- Place of birth: Ibarra, Spain
- Height: 1.88 m (6 ft 2 in)
- Position: Goalkeeper

Youth career
- Tolosa
- 1998–2000: Athletic Bilbao
- 2000–2001: Tolosa
- 2001: Real Unión

Senior career*
Years	Team	Apps	(Gls)
2001–2002	Real Unión	4	(0)
2002–2006	Real Sociedad B	58	(0)
2006–2009	Pontevedra	42	(0)
2009–2010	Cultural Leonesa	20	(0)
2010–2012	Guadalajara	68	(0)
2012–2015	Córdoba	39	(0)
2015–2016	AEK Larnaca	4	(0)
2016–2017	Numancia	1	(0)
2017–2019	Burgos	75	(0)
2019–2022	Amorebieta	63	(0)
Total		371	(0)
- * Club domestic league appearances and goals

Mikel Saizar Soroa (born 18 January 1983) is a Spanish former professional footballer who played as a goalkeeper.

== Club career ==
Born in Ibarra, Gipuzkoa, Saizar made his senior debut with Real Unión in the 2001–02 season, in the Segunda División B. In the summer of 2002 he joined Basque neighbours Real Sociedad, being assigned to the reserves also in the third tier.

Saizar continued to compete in the third division subsequently, representing Pontevedra CF, Cultural y Deportiva Leonesa and CD Guadalajara. With the latter side, he achieved promotion to Segunda División in 2011.

On 27 August 2011, aged 28, Saizar made his debut as a professional, in a 1–1 home draw against UD Las Palmas. He played all 42 league games during the campaign, as the Castilla-La Mancha club narrowly avoided relegation.

On 10 July 2012, Saizar moved to Córdoba CF also in the second tier. He spent his first year as a backup to Alberto García.

Saizar renewed his contract with the Andalusians on 14 February 2013, and was ever-present in 2013–14 as his team returned to La Liga after a 42-year absence. He made his debut in the competition on 21 February 2015, in a 1–2 home loss to Valencia CF.

Saizar cut ties with Córdoba on 21 July 2015, following their relegation. On 30 November 2016, after spending one season as a backup to his compatriot Toño at AEK Larnaca FC from the Cypriot First Division, he signed a one-year deal with CD Numancia. He played only once for the Soria-based club then dropped down a division to join Burgos CF, where he kept a clean sheet for the first nine games of the 2017–18 season before a 1–1 draw at CD Mirandés on 21 October.

== Career statistics ==
Appearances and goals by club, season and competition
Club	Season	League			Cup		Europe		Other		Total	
Club	Season	Division	Apps	Goals	Apps	Goals	Apps	Goals	Apps	Goals	Apps	Goals
Real Unión	2001–02	Segunda División B	4	0	—		—		—		4	0
Real Sociedad B	2003–04	Segunda División B	20	0	—		—		—		20	0
Real Sociedad B	2004–05	Segunda División B	11	0	—		—		—		11	0
Real Sociedad B	2005–06	Segunda División B	27	0	—		—		2 (Note: Appearances in Segunda División B play-offs)	0	29	0
Real Sociedad B	Total		58	0	—		—		2	0	60	0
Pontevedra	2006–07	Segunda División B	2	0	1	0	—		—		3	0
Pontevedra	2007–08	Segunda División B	2	0	5	0	—		2	0	9	0
Pontevedra	2008–09	Segunda División B	38	0	1	0	—		—		39	0
Pontevedra	Total		42	0	7	0	—		0	0	49	0
Cultural Leonesa	2009–10	Segunda División B	20	0	4	0	—		—		24	0
Guadalajara	2010–11	Segunda División B	26	0	0	0	—		6	0	32	0
Guadalajara	2011–12	Segunda División	42	0	1	0	—		—		43	0
Guadalajara	Total		68	0	1	0	—		6	0	75	0
Córdoba	2012–13	Segunda División	2	0	6	0	—		—		8	0
Córdoba	2013–14	Segunda División	31	0	0	0	—		—		31	0
Córdoba	2014–15	La Liga	6	0	2	0	—		—		8	0
Córdoba	Total		39	0	8	0	—		—		47	0
AEK Larnaca	2015–16	Cypriot First Division	1	0	0	0	0	0	—		1	0
AEK Larnaca	2015–16	Cypriot First Division	—		—		0	0	—		8	0
AEK Larnaca	Total		1	0	0	0	0	0	—		1	0
Numancia	2016–17	Segunda División	1	0	—		—		—		1	0
Burgos	2017–18	Segunda División B	38	0	—		—		0	0	38	0
Burgos	2018–19	Segunda División B	37	0	—		—		—		37	0
Burgos	Total		75	0	—		—		0	0	75	0
Amorebieta	2019–20	Segunda División B	28	0	0	0	—		—		28	0
Amorebieta	2020–21	Segunda División B	25	0	1	0	—		2	0	28	0
Amorebieta	2021–22	Segunda División	10	0	2	0	—		—		37	0
Amorebieta	Total		63	0	3	0	—		2	0	68	0
Career total			371	0	23	0	0	0	12	0	406	0
