= Iker Seguín =

Spanish footballer (born 1989)

Personal information
- Full name: Iker Seguín Cid
- Date of birth: 12 July 1989 (age 37)
- Place of birth: Eibar, Spain
- Height: 1.83 m (6 ft 0 in)
- Position: Winger

Youth career
- Eibar
- Real Sociedad

Senior career*
Years	Team	Apps	(Gls)
2007–2008	Real Sociedad B	2	(0)
2008–2009	Basconia	34	(7)
2009–2010	Bilbao Athletic	11	(0)
2010–2012	Lemona	56	(3)
2012–2013	Espanyol B	10	(0)
2013–2015	Real Unión	56	(1)
2015–2024	Amorebieta	226	(19)
- * Club domestic league appearances and goals as of 8 June 2024

Iker Seguín Cid (born 12 July 1989) is a Spanish footballer. Mainly a left winger, he can also play as a left back.

== Career ==
Born in Eibar, Gipuzkoa, Basque Country, Seguín represented SD Eibar and Real Sociedad as a youth. He made his debut as a senior with the latter's reserves on 8 December 2007, coming on as a half-time substitute for Oskitz in a 0–0 Segunda División B away draw against Real Valladolid B.

In 2008, Seguín moved to Athletic Bilbao and was initially assigned to the farm team in Tercera División. He was promoted to the B-team for the 2009–10 season, but featured rarely.

On 25 August 2010, Seguín signed for SD Lemona also in the third division. On 19 June 2012, after the club's relegation, he moved to fellow league team RCD Espanyol B.

On 8 August 2013, Seguín moved to Real Unión still in the third tier, after terminating his contract with the Pericos. He moved to SD Amorebieta in the same category on 10 July 2015, being a regular starter and captain as his club achieved a first-ever promotion to Segunda División in the 2020–21 campaign.

Seguín made his professional debut at the age of 32 on 23 August 2021, replacing Josu Ozkoidi late into a 0–2 away loss against CD Mirandés. Amorebieta was relegated at the end of the season, but Seguín agreed to extend his contract for a further year, and passed the milestone of 200 appearances for the club in September 2022.

== Personal life ==
Seguín's younger brother Aitor is also a footballer and a winger. He too played for Bilbao Athletic.

== Honours ==
Amorebieta

- Primera Federación: 2022–23
