= Zamudio SD =

Spanish football club

Coordinates: 43.2879°N 2.8604°W

Zamudio
- Full name: Zamudio Sociedad Deportiva
- Founded: 1943
- Ground: Gazituaga, Zamudio, Basque Country, Spain
- Capacity: 5,000
- President: Fidel de Prado
- Head coach: Gorka Rueda
- League: Tercera Federación – Group 4
- 2024–25: División de Honor, 1st of 18 (champions)
Home colours	Away colours

Zamudio Sociedad Deportiva is a Spanish football team based in Zamudio, in the autonomous community of Basque Country. Founded in 1943, it plays in Tercera Federación – Group 4, holding home games at Estadio Gazituaga, with a capacity of 5,000 seats.

== Season to season ==
Season	Tier	Division	Place	Copa del Rey
1943–44	5	2ª Reg.	5th	
1944–45	5	2ª Reg.	5th	
1945–46	5	2ª Reg.	4th	
1946–47	5	2ª Reg.	6th	
1947–48	5	2ª Reg.	8th	
1948–49	5	2ª Reg.	6th	
1949–50	6	3ª Reg.	2nd	
1950–51	6	3ª Reg.	1st	
1951–52	5	2ª Reg.	2nd	
1952–53	5	2ª Reg.	5th	
1953–54	5	2ª Reg.	6th	
1954–55	5	2ª Reg.	5th	
1955–56	5	2ª Reg.	2nd	
1956–57	4	1ª Reg.	10th	
1957–58	4	1ª Reg.	8th	
1958–59	4	1ª Reg.	18th	
1959–60	5	2ª Reg.	13th	
1960–61	5	2ª Reg.	10th	
1961–62	5	2ª Reg.	5th	
1962–63	5	2ª Reg.	6th	

Season	Tier	Division	Place	Copa del Rey
1963–64	5	2ª Reg.	10th	
1964–65	5	2ª Reg.	14th	
1965–66	5	2ª Reg.	5th	
1966–67	5	2ª Reg.	8th	
1967–68	5	2ª Reg.	11th	
1968–69	6	2ª Reg.	13th	
1969–70	6	2ª Reg.	1st	
1970–71	5	1ª Reg.	7th	
1971–72	5	1ª Reg.	7th	
1972–73	5	1ª Reg.	8th	
1973–74	5	1ª Reg.	9th	
1974–75	5	1ª Reg.	8th	
1975–76	5	1ª Reg.	5th	
1976–77	5	1ª Reg.	5th	
1977–78	5	Reg. Pref.	19th	
1978–79	6	1ª Reg.	17th	
1979–80	7	2ª Reg.	3rd	
1980–81	7	2ª Reg.	1st	
1981–82	6	1ª Reg.	2nd	
1982–83	5	Reg. Pref.	20th	

Season	Tier	Division	Place	Copa del Rey
1983–84	6	1ª Reg.	3rd	
1984–85	6	1ª Reg.	6th	
1985–86	6	1ª Reg.	5th	
1986–87	6	1ª Reg.	10th	
1987–88	6	1ª Reg.	18th	
1988–89	7	2ª Reg.	2nd	
1989–90	6	1ª Reg.	6th	
1990–91	6	1ª Terr.	4th	
1991–92	6	1ª Terr.	1st	
1992–93	5	Terr. Pref.	2nd	
1993–94	5	Terr. Pref.	1st	
1994–95	4	3ª	10th	
1995–96	4	3ª	2nd	
1996–97	3	2ª B	18th	
1997–98	4	3ª	15th	
1998–99	4	3ª	19th	
1999–2000	5	Terr. Pref.	1st	
2000–01	4	3ª	5th	
2001–02	4	3ª	15th	
2002–03	5	Div. Hon.	1st	

Season	Tier	Division	Place	Copa del Rey
2003–04	4	3ª	11th	
2004–05	4	3ª	5th	
2005–06	4	3ª	16th	
2006–07	5	Div. Hon.	1st	
2007–08	4	3ª	4th	
2008–09	4	3ª	9th	
2009–10	4	3ª	9th	
2010–11	4	3ª	15th	
2011–12	4	3ª	9th	
2012–13	4	3ª	9th	
2013–14	4	3ª	8th	
2014–15	4	3ª	11th	
2015–16	4	3ª	1st	
2016–17	3	2ª B	20th	First round
2017–18	4	3ª	12th	
2018–19	4	3ª	16th	
2019–20	5	Div. Hon.	6th	
2020–21	5	Div. Hon.	2nd	
2021–22	6	Div. Hon.	3rd	
2022–23	6	Div. Hon.	10th	

Season	Tier	Division	Place	Copa del Rey
2023–24	6	Div. Hon.	4th	
2024–25	6	Div. Hon.	1st	
2025–26	5	3ª Fed.	16th	
2026–27	6	Div. Hon.		

- 2 seasons in Segunda División B
- 20 seasons in Tercera División
- 1 season in Tercera Federación

== Current squad ==
As of 15 March 2017

Note: Flags indicate national team as defined under FIFA eligibility rules; some limited exceptions apply. Players may hold more than one non-FIFA nationality.

No.	Pos.	Nation	Player
—	GK	ESP	Ibón Barandiarán
—	GK	ESP	Azpi
—	DF	ESP	Mikel Degre
—	DF	ESP	Ibai Salvador
—	DF	ESP	Asier Iriondo
—	DF	ESP	Josu Etxaniz
—	DF	ESP	Mikel Garmendia
—	DF	ESP	Adrián Celador
—	DF	ESP	Julen Uriguen
—	DF	ESP	Xabi Franco
—	MF	ESP	Andoitz Galdós
—	MF	ESP	Arman Imaz

No.	Pos.	Nation	Player
—	MF	ESP	Julen Huidobro
—	MF	ESP	Iker de Eguino
—	MF	ESP	Ander Garmendia
—	MF	ESP	Larra
—	MF	ESP	Javier Guibert
—	MF	ESP	Markel Lozano
—	MF	ESP	Oier Sarriegi
—	MF	ESP	Urtzi Urcelay
—	FW	ESP	Eneko Iriondo
—	FW	ESP	Iker Revuelta
—	FW	ESP	Julen Iriarte
—	FW	ESP	Asier Barahona

== Honours ==
- Tercera División: 2015–16
