= Gaizka Larrazabal =

Spanish footballer (born 1997)

Personal information
- Full name: Gaizka Larrazabal Goikoetxea
- Date of birth: 17 December 1997 (age 28)
- Place of birth: Bilbao, Spain
- Height: 1.81 m (5 ft 11 in)
- Positions: Wing-back; winger

Team information
- Current team: Bolton Wanderers
- Number: 22

Youth career
- Lauro Ikastola
- 2015–2016: Danok Bat

Senior career*
Years	Team	Apps	(Gls)
2016–2017	Zamudio	29	(3)
2017–2019	Bilbao Athletic	63	(11)
2019–2020	Athletic Bilbao	10	(0)
2020–2023	Zaragoza	51	(0)
2021–2022	→ Amorebieta (loan)	38	(3)
2023–2026	Casa Pia	97	(9)
2026–	Bolton Wanderers	14	(1)

International career^{‡}
2019–	Basque Country	2	(0)
- * Club domestic league appearances and goals as of 7 November 2026 ‡ National team caps and goals as of 15 November 2026

Gaizka Larrazabal Goikoetxea (born 17 December 1997) is a Spanish professional footballer who plays as a right wing-back or right winger for EFL Championship club Bolton Wanderers..

== Club career ==
Born in Bilbao, Biscay, Basque Country, Larrazabal started his career with Lauro Ikastola, the team affiliated to his school in the town of Loiu. In 2015, he had a successful trial with Bilbao-based youth club Danok Bat; it took until the latter part of his season there to establish himself in the team in the 'Juvenil' league, but by its end he had drawn interest from senior clubs.

On 3 June 2016, after finishing his formation, Larrazabal signed for newly promoted Segunda División B side Zamudio. He made his senior debut on 27 August 2016, playing the entire second half in a 1–3 home loss to Bilbao Athletic, and scored his first goal on 10 December by netting the last in a 3–1 home defeat of Toledo. He finished the campaign with three goals in 29 appearances, although Zamudio finished bottom of the table and were relegated.

On 5 April 2017, Larrazabal agreed to a two-year contract with Athletic Bilbao, effective as of 1 July; upon arriving, he was assigned to the B-team. He spent two seasons with Bilbao Athletic in the third tier, playing regularly for the team and scoring nine goals in 2018–19.

On 14 May 2019, Larrazabal agreed to a new two-year deal with the Lions, being definitely promoted to the main squad. He made his first team – and La Liga – debut on 24 August, coming on as a substitute for Óscar de Marcos in a 1–1 draw away to Getafe.

On 2 October 2020, Larrazabal terminated his contract with the Lions, and agreed to a three-year deal with Segunda División side Real Zaragoza just hours later; Athletic also retained a two-year buyback clause. On 24 August of the following year, he moved to fellow second division side Amorebieta on loan for the season.

While on loan at Amorebieta, Larrazabal was converted into a right wing-back, being an undisputed starter for the side.

On 3 July 2023, Primeira Liga side Casa Pia announced the free signing of Larrazabal.

== International career ==
Larrazabal made his debut for the unofficial Basque Country national team in May 2019, in a 0–0 draw away to Panama for which a small, youthful and inexperienced squad was selected.

== Personal life ==
Larrazabal's father is Aitor Larrazábal, who made over 400 appearances for Athletic Bilbao as a defender between 1990 and 2004 and later became a manager, and whose goal celebrations included producing a pacifier from his shorts to represent his baby sons. They met as opponents when Gaizka was playing for Zamudio and Aitor was in charge of Amorebieta, and again when Bilbao Athletic faced Barakaldo.

In 2002, Aitor lined up in the same Athletic Bilbao team as Aritz Aduriz, who was also on the field for Gaizka's debut for the club nearly 17 years later. The Larrazabals were the first father and son to play for Athletic since goalkeepers Carmelo and Andoni Cedrún, and the first to both feature for the Basque Country team since 'Periko' and Xabi Alonso.
