= Urritxe =

Sports stadium in Basque Country, Spain

- Interactive map of Urritxe
- Full name: Campo de Fútbol Municipal Nuevo Urritxe
- Former names: Campo Municipal de Urriche
- Address: Urritxe auzoa, s/n, 48340
- Location: Amorebieta-Etxano, Spain
- Coordinates: 43°13′15.7807″N 2°43′31.6070″W
- Owner: Amorebieta-Etxano City Council
- Capacity: 3,000
- Surface: Grass
- Field size: 102x64m

Construction
- Built: 2002
- Opened: 12 October 2002
- Cost: €1,320,000 (estimated)

Tenant
- SD Amorebieta (2002–present)

The Campo de Fútbol Municipal Nuevo Urritxe, commonly known as just Urritxe, is a multi-use stadium located in Amorebieta-Etxano, Biscay, Basque Country, Spain. It is currently used for football matches and is the home stadium of SD Amorebieta.

== History ==
Built in 2002 over the plot which was occupied by the old stadium, Urritxe was inaugurated on 12 October of that year, with its first match being a friendly between Athletic Bilbao and Racing de Santander. It contains a roofed stand with a capacity of 500 people, while the remainder of its capacity is distributed for standing places or seats.

In June 2021, after SD Amorebieta's promotion to Segunda División, the club had to search for another home stadium as Urritxe did not comply with the Liga de Fútbol Profesional requirements. The club later reached an agreement with Athletic for the utilisation of the Lezama Facilities (this was repeated in 2023–24).
