= Lezama =

- Municipality
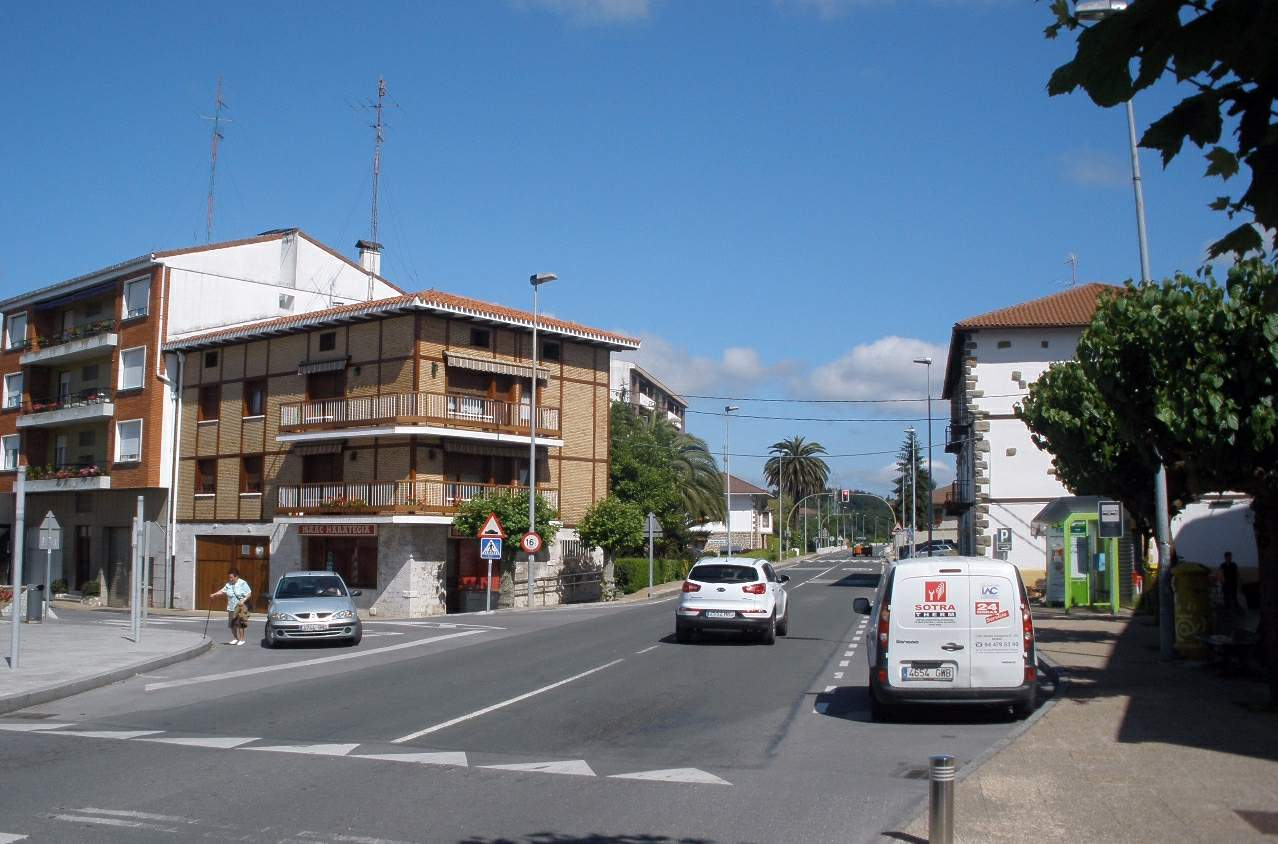

- Coat of arms

- Location of Lezama within the Basque Country Lezama (Spain)
- Coordinates: 43°16′29″N 2°50′00″W
- Country: Spain
- Autonomous community: País Vasco
- Province: Biscay
- Eskualdea / Comarca: Txorierri
- Founded: 1024

Government
  - Mayor: Alaitz Etxeandia (EAJ-PNV)

Area
  - Total: 16.8 km^{2} (6.5 sq mi)
- Elevation: 65 m (213 ft)

Population (2025-01-01)
  - Total: 2,430
  - Density: 145/km^{2} (375/sq mi)
- Demonym: Lezamarra (Basque)
- Time zone: UTC+1 (CET)
  - Summer (DST): UTC+2 (CEST)
- Postal code: 48196
- Website: Official website

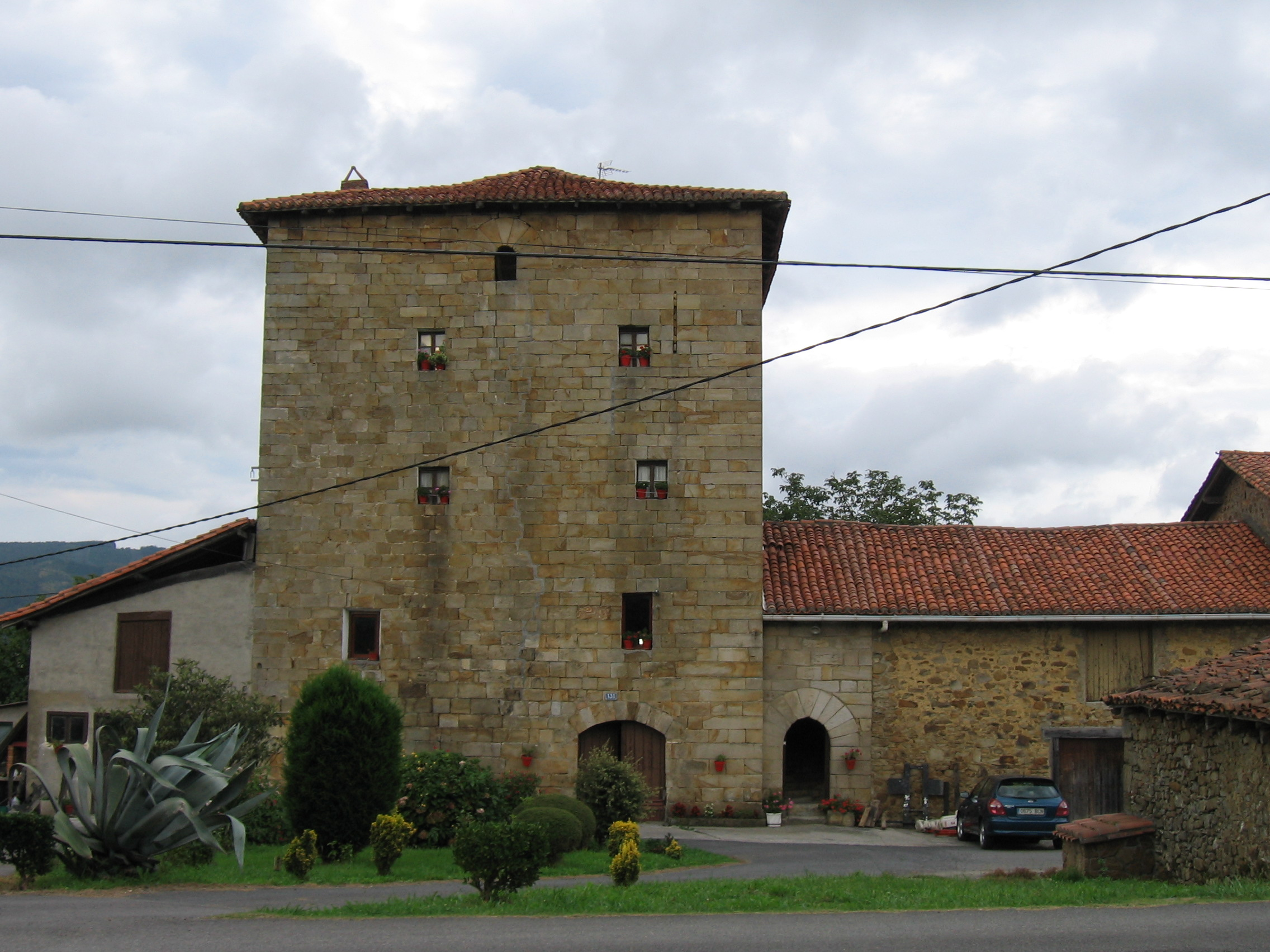
Torre de Lezama

Lezama is a town and municipality located in the province of Biscay, in the autonomous community of Basque Country, northern Spain. It is home to the training headquarters of the football team Athletic Bilbao, and is accessible by bus - BizkaiBus (A3223) - from Bilbao.
