= Lezama Facilities =

Training ground of Athletic Bilbao

Coordinates: 43°16′42″N 02°50′19″W

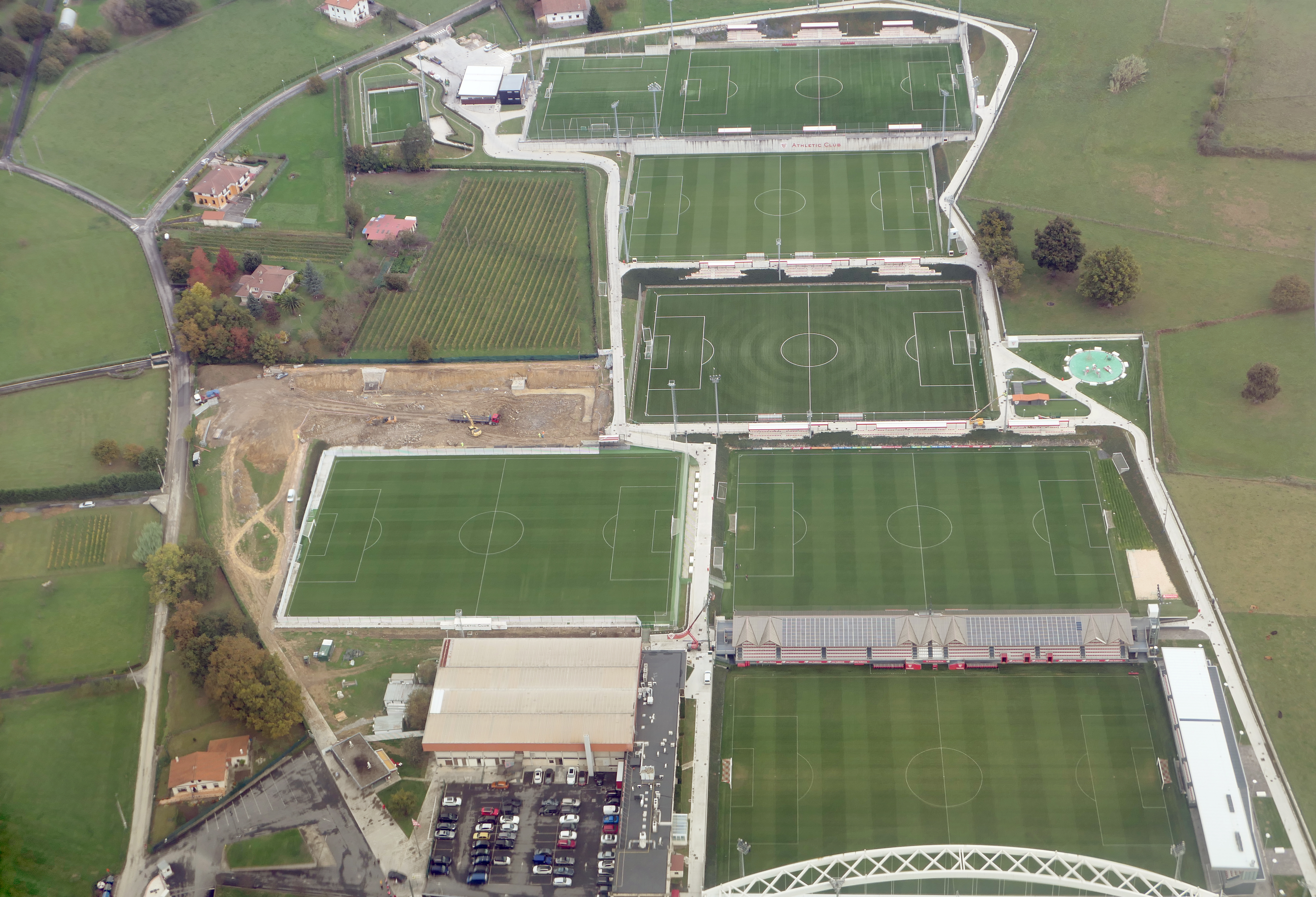
- An aerial view of the complex, 2019
- Interactive map of Lezama Facilities
- Address: Barrio Garaioltza, 147, 48196
- Location: Lezama, Basque Country
- Owner: Athletic Bilbao
- Type: Football training ground

Construction
- Built: 1971

Tenants
- Athletic Bilbao (training) (1971–present); Athletic Bilbao B (1971–present); Athletic Bilbao cantera (1971–present); Athletic Club Femenino (2002–present); Athletic Club Femenino B (2002–present); Amorebieta (2021–2022; 2023–present)

Website
- Lezama Facilities

The Lezama Facilities (Basque: Lezamako Kirol-instalakuntzak, Spanish: Instalaciones de Lezama), are the training ground and academy of the Primera Division club Athletic Bilbao. Located in the village of Lezama, around 10–15 kilometers east of Bilbao, the facilities were opened in 1971 and currently cover 13 hectares (130,000 square meters). Athletic's academy is often referred to metonymically as Lezama.

Lezama hosts the Athletic men's first team for training and the league matches of the Liga F club Athletic Club Femenino, as well as the youth teams of the Athletic cantera (academy): the men's reserve team, the women's reserve team, the junior teams (ages 17–19), the cadet teams (ages 15–16), the youngster teams (ages 13–14), and the children's teams (ages 11–12).

In June 2021, the facilities also became the temporary home ground of Segunda División newcomers SD Amorebieta, as Amorebieta's stadium Urritxe did not meet league requirements. The arrangement was repeated in 2023–24 when Amorebieta was re-promoted to the Segunda Division.

== Facilities ==
- Field 2 (seating 2,989) is the home stadium of Athletic Club Femenino and the men's reserve team Bilbao Athletic, as well as SD Amorebieta during its stays in the Segunda División.
- 4 full-size natural grass pitches including Field 1 (used by the men's senior team) and Field 5 (used by the Juvenil (under-19) academy teams).
- 3 full-size artificial turf pitches including Field 8 (used by the women's reserve team).
- 1 mini football artificial turf pitch.
- A service centre with a gymnasium, press rooms, and medical facilities.
- An 18-bed dormitory for academy athletes, opened in September 2021.

== The San Mames arch ==
The main stand of Athletic's original San Mamés Stadium was supported by an iconic arch. Erected in 1953, the arch was reportedly the first of its kind ever built in an athletic stadium. When the ground was demolished in 2013, Athletic preserved the arch and transported it to Lezama, reinstalling the arch alongside the Athletic Club Femenino and Bilbao Athletic pitch. The arch overlooks Field 2's spectator seats.

The complex also features busts of Athletic icons Telmo Zarra and Piru Gainza.
