= SD Amorebieta =

Coordinates: 43.221348°N 2.724883°W

- Full name: Sociedad Deportiva Amorebieta
- Nicknames: Urdinak; Azules (Blues)
- Founded: 4 January 1925; 101 years ago
- Ground: Urritxe, Amorebieta-Etxano; Basque Country, Spain
- Capacity: 3,250
- President: Jon Larrea
- Head coach: Aitor Zulaika
- League: Segunda Federación – Group 1
- 2025–26: Segunda Federación – Group 2, 6th of 18
- Website: sdamorebieta.net
Home colours	Away colours

Sociedad Deportiva Amorebieta is a Spanish football team based in Amorebieta-Etxano, in the Basque Country. Founded in 1925, it currently plays in Segunda Federación – Group 1, holding home games at Campo Municipal de Urritxe.

== History ==
Amorebieta was founded in 1925 after the dissolution of Sociedad Deportiva Beti-Arin (founded on 2 December 1923). The Zornotzarra club, alongside 21 other clubs in Biscay, joined the Biscayan Football Federation.

In the 1926–27 season, the club made an outstanding campaign in its second competitive year. It had as its main rival FBC Durango, who finished in the top position after a tiebreaker match, after both teams totalled 14 points in the season. Despite finishing second, Amorebieta clinched the first promotion of its history, rising one step inside the Biscayan Regional category to play, the next year, in the Preferente C division.

In 1962–63, Amorebieta played in the semi-finals of the Spanish Amateur Championship against Real Madrid's farm team, losing 0–2 in Vallecas and managing a 2–2 draw in the second leg, thus being eliminated.

Eighteen years later, the team finished second in Preferente, and played in a promotion play-off against Mondragón CF, which won 4–3 in the first leg; however, a 2–0 home triumph in the second match promoted, for the second time in its history, the club to the fourth division, where it remained for the following three decades.

On 29 May 2011, Amorebieta was promoted for the first time to Segunda División B after beating CD Manacor in the 2011 Tercera División play-offs. In its first season in the third tier, the club finished in the fourth position in Group 2 and qualified for the promotion play-offs, but was eliminated in the first round by Balompédica Linense. In the 2017–18 season Amorebieta finished in the 14th position in Segunda División B, Group 2. The following 2018–19 campaign was more successful, as the club finished eighth.

On 22 May 2021, Amorebieta was promoted to the Segunda División for the first time ever by defeating Badajoz in the final round of the promotion play-offs. Immediately they faced their first problem of where to play, as their basic Urritxe ground did not meet requirements by several measures and would be prohibitive to upgrade, and none of the possible options, including Ipurua in Eibar and Lezama outside Bilbao, was an ideal solution. On 17 June, the club reached an agreement with Athletic for the utilisation of Lezama's ground 2, after it was approved by the LFP. On 21 May 2022, Amorebieta was relegated back to the third tier.

On 27 May 2023, the team bounced back to the second division (they would play at Lezama again in 2023–24). However, the next season, they met the same fate as 2 years earlier, finishing 19th and being relegated back to the third tier. On 3 May 2025, Amorebieta suffered another relegation to the fourth level, following a 0-2 loss to Barakaldo.

== Season to season ==
Season	Tier	Division	Place	Copa del Rey
1939–40	5	2ª Reg.	3rd	
1940–41	5	2ª Reg.	3rd	
1941–42	5	2ª Reg.	1st	
1942–43	4	1ª Reg. B	2nd	
1943–44	4	1ª Reg.	3rd	
1944–45	4	1ª Reg.	2nd	
1945–46	4	1ª Reg.	3rd	
1946–47	4	1ª Reg.	13th	
1947–48	5	2ª Reg.	6th	
1948–49	5	2ª Reg.	2nd	
1949–50	5	2ª Reg.	8th	
1950–51	5	2ª Reg.	6th	
1951–52	5	2ª Reg.	3rd	
1952–53	5	2ª Reg.	9th	
1953–54	5	2ª Reg.	7th	
1954–55	5	2ª Reg.	8th	
1955–56	5	2ª Reg.	3rd	
1956–57	5	2ª Reg.	4th	
1957–58	5	2ª Reg.	6th	
1958–59	5	2ª Reg.	2nd	

Season	Tier	Division	Place	Copa del Rey
1959–60	5	2ª Reg.	1st	
1960–61	4	1ª Reg.	4th	
1961–62	4	1ª Reg.	3rd	
1962–63	3	3ª	3rd	
1963–64	3	3ª	10th	
1964–65	3	3ª	7th	
1965–66	3	3ª	3rd	
1966–67	3	3ª	12th	
1967–68	3	3ª	12th	
1968–69	4	Reg. Pref.	7th	
1969–70	4	Reg. Pref.	5th	
1970–71	4	Reg. Pref.	9th	
1971–72	4	Reg. Pref.	18th	
1972–73	5	1ª Reg.	5th	
1973–74	5	1ª Reg.	3rd	
1974–75	4	Reg. Pref.	13th	
1975–76	4	Reg. Pref.	13th	
1976–77	4	Reg. Pref.	18th	
1977–78	5	Reg. Pref.	14th	
1978–79	5	Reg. Pref.	6th	

Season	Tier	Division	Place	Copa del Rey
1979–80	5	Reg. Pref.	3rd	
1980–81	5	Reg. Pref.	2nd	
1981–82	4	3ª	5th	
1982–83	4	3ª	3rd	First round
1983–84	4	3ª	9th	First round
1984–85	4	3ª	3rd	
1985–86	4	3ª	5th	First round
1986–87	4	3ª	5th	First round
1987–88	4	3ª	9th	First round
1988–89	4	3ª	16th	
1989–90	4	3ª	12th	
1990–91	4	3ª	4th	
1991–92	4	3ª	4th	First round
1992–93	4	3ª	14th	Second round
1993–94	4	3ª	17th	
1994–95	4	3ª	12th	
1995–96	4	3ª	10th	
1996–97	4	3ª	13th	
1997–98	4	3ª	4th	
1998–99	4	3ª	14th	

Season	Tier	Division	Place	Copa del Rey
1999–2000	4	3ª	12th	
2000–01	4	3ª	13th	
2001–02	4	3ª	4th	
2002–03	4	3ª	13th	
2003–04	4	3ª	13th	
2004–05	4	3ª	13th	
2005–06	4	3ª	3rd	
2006–07	4	3ª	2nd	
2007–08	4	3ª	10th	
2008–09	4	3ª	10th	
2009–10	4	3ª	3rd	
2010–11	4	3ª	1st	
2011–12	3	2ª B	4th	First round
2012–13	3	2ª B	6th	First round
2013–14	3	2ª B	10th	First round
2014–15	3	2ª B	10th	First round
2015–16	3	2ª B	9th	
2016–17	3	2ª B	14th	Third round
2017–18	3	2ª B	14th	
2018–19	3	2ª B	8th	

Season	Tier	Division	Place	Copa del Rey
2019–20	3	2ª B	6th	First round
2020–21	3	2ª B	3rd	First round
2021–22	2	2ª	19th	Second round
2022–23	3	1ª Fed.	1st	First round
2023–24	2	2ª	19th	Round of 32
2024–25	3	1ª Fed.	20th	First round
2025–26	4	2ª Fed.	6th	
2026–27	4	2ª Fed.		TBD

- 2 seasons in Segunda División
- 2 seasons in Primera Federación
- 10 seasons in Segunda División B
- 2 seasons in Segunda Federación
- 36 seasons in Tercera División

== Current squad ==
As of 10 September 2026.

Note: Flags indicate national team as defined under FIFA eligibility rules; some limited exceptions apply. Players may hold more than one non-FIFA nationality.

No.	Pos.	Nation	Player
1	GK	ESP	Jon Altamira
3	DF	ESP	Asier Hernáiz
4	DF	ESP	Javier Entreca
5	DF	ESP	Iker Torre
6	MF	ESP	Txaber Ajuriagoikoa
7	FW	ESP	Ibai Cabo (on loan from Real Sociedad C)
8	MF	ESP	Erik Morán
9	FW	ESP	Ion Etxaniz
10	FW	ESP	Iker Rekagorri
11	FW	ESP	Xalbat Larralde (on loan from Real Sociedad C)
13	GK	ESP	Xabier Murgoitio

No.	Pos.	Nation	Player
14	DF	ESP	Ekain Díaz
15	MF	ESP	Ekaitz Presa
17	FW	ESP	Unax Benito
18	DF	ESP	Aitor Intxausti
19	FW	ESP	Guillermo Fernández
20	MF	ESP	Gorka Agirre
21	MF	ESP	Eder Aguirregomezcorta
22	DF	ESP	Joseba Muguruza
23	FW	ESP	Josep Díaz
40	FW	ESP	Unai Bikandi

=== Reserve team ===
Note: Flags indicate national team as defined under FIFA eligibility rules; some limited exceptions apply. Players may hold more than one non-FIFA nationality.

No.	Pos.	Nation	Player

=== Current technical staff ===
Position	Staff
Head coach	(Spain) Julen Guerrero
Assistant coach	(Spain) Bernat Vizcaya (Spain) Jordi Martín
Fitness coach	(Spain) Aitor Baraia
Goalkeeping coach	(Spain) Axel Alkorta
Physiotherapist	(Spain) Zohiartze Moral
Match delegate	(Spain) Iker Zarate

Last updated: 11 September 2024
Source: SD Amorebieta (in Spanish)

== Honours & achievements ==
- Promotion to Segunda División: 2020–21, 2022–23
- Primera Federación: (Note: Third tier) 2022–23
- Tercera División: (Note: Fourth tier) 2010–11 (Note: Promoted in play-offs)
- Promotion to Preferente C: 1926–27
- Promotion to Tercera División: 1961–62, 1980–81

== Former players ==
Perhaps Amorebieta's most successful former player is Xabier Etxeita, who began his career at his hometown club before moving on to Athletic Bilbao, where he was a winner of the 2015 Supercopa de España and was capped by Spain before eventually returning in 2022. Amorebieta have close ties with Athletic, and several players have appeared for both clubs.

== Reserve team ==
Amorebieta's reserve team, SD Amorebieta B, was founded in 2003 and plays in the Primera División de Vizcaya, which corresponds to the eighth division. In September 2021, shortly after the B-team returned to action after one year of inactivity, a second reserve team called SD Amorebieta C was incorporated into the club's structure.
