= 2024–25 SD Eibar season =

SD Eibar
2024–25 season
- Head coach: Joseba Etxeberria (until 16 February); Beñat San José (from 17 February)
- Stadium: Ipurua Municipal Stadium
- Segunda División: 9th
- Copa del Rey: First round
- Top goalscorer: League and All: Jon Bautista (11)
- Highest home attendance: 6,307 vs Racing Santander
- Lowest home attendance: 3,538 vs Castellón
- Average home league attendance: 5,020
- Biggest win: Home: 4–1 vs Cordoba; Away: 3–1 vs Eldense; 2–0 vs Cartagena; 2–0 vs Granada
- Biggest defeat: Home: 1–3 vs Sporting Gijón; 0–2 vs Elche; Away: 0–2 vs Elche; 0–2 vs Castellón
Home colours	Away colours	Third colours

The 2024–25 season was the 85th season in the history of SD Eibar, and the club's fourth consecutive season in Segunda División. In addition to the domestic league, the club participated in the Copa del Rey.

== Players ==
=== First-team squad ===
Note: Flags indicate national team as defined under FIFA eligibility rules; some limited exceptions apply. Players may hold more than one non-FIFA nationality.

No.	Pos.	Nation	Player
1	GK	ESP	Álex Domínguez
2	DF	ESP	Sergio Cubero
3	DF	ESP	Cristian Gutiérrez
4	DF	ESP	Álvaro Carrillo
5	DF	ESP	Chema
6	MF	ESP	Sergio Álvarez
7	FW	ESP	Xeber Alkain
8	MF	ESP	Peru Nolaskoain
9	FW	ESP	Jon Bautista
10	MF	BRA	Matheus Pereira
11	FW	ESP	Jorge Pascual
12	MF	ESP	Iván Gil
13	GK	ESP	Jonmi Magunagoitia

No.	Pos.	Nation	Player
14	DF	ESP	Hodei Arrillaga
15	DF	ESP	Arnau Comas
17	MF	ESP	José Corpas
18	MF	ESP	Martín Merquelanz
19	FW	ESP	Toni Villa
20	MF	ESP	Antonio Puertas
21	MF	ESP	Jon Guruzeta
22	DF	ESP	Aritz Arambarri
23	DF	ESP	Anaitz Arbilla
24	MF	ESP	Javi Martínez
29	MF	ESP	Ander Madariaga
31	MF	ESP	Ángel Troncho

=== Reserve team ===
Note: Flags indicate national team as defined under FIFA eligibility rules; some limited exceptions apply. Players may hold more than one non-FIFA nationality.

No.	Pos.	Nation	Player
26	GK	ESP	Ibon Ispizua
28	DF	ESP	Iker Alday
30	FW	ESP	Ekaitz Redondo
32	FW	ESP	Aitor Galarza
33	DF	ESP	Raul Giménez

No.	Pos.	Nation	Player
34	MF	ESP	Oier Llorente
35	MF	ESP	Óscar Carrasco
36	MF	ESP	Julen Agirre
37	FW	ESP	Endika Mateos
40	MF	ESP	Marc Delgado

=== Out ===
Note: Flags indicate national team as defined under FIFA eligibility rules; some limited exceptions apply. Players may hold more than one non-FIFA nationality.

No.	Pos.	Nation	Player
1	GK	BRA	Daniel Fuzato (until 7 January 2025)
27	FW	BUL	Slavy (until 7 January 2025)
15	DF	JPN	Kento Hashimoto (9 January 2025)

== Transfers ==
=== In ===
Pos.	Player	Transferred from	Fee	Date	Source
DF	(Spain) Sergio Cubero	Racing Ferrol	Loarn return	1 July 2024	
DF	(Spain) Chema	Alcorcón	Loarn return	1 July 2024	
MF	(Spain) Ángel Troncho	Amorebieta	Loarn return	1 July 2024	
MF	(Spain) Jon Guruzeta	Sestao River	Free	2 July 2024	
GK	(Spain) Jonmi Magunagoitia	Amorebieta	Free	3 July 2024	
GK	(Brazil) Daniel Fuzato	Ibiza	Free	10 July 2024	
FW	(Bulgaria) Slavy	Real Valladolid Promesas	Free	10 July 2024	
DF	(Spain) Álvaro Carrillo	Real Madrid Castilla	Free	12 July 2024	
FW	(Spain) Antonio Puertas	Granada	Free	23 July 2024	
FW	(Spain) Xeber Alkain	Deportivo Alavés	Free	30 July 2024	
MF	(Spain) Martín Merquelanz	Real Sociedad	Free	7 August 2024	
MF	(Spain) Toni Villa	Girona	Free	27 August 2024	
DF	(Spain) Aritz Arambarri	Léganés	Free	29 August 2024	
DF	(Japan) Kento Hashimoto	Huesca	Free	29 August 2024	
MF	(Spain) Javi Martínez	Osasuna	Free	8 January 2025	

=== Out ===
Pos.	Player	Transferred to	Fee	Date	Source
MF	(Spain) Mario Soriano	Deportivo La Coruña	Loan return	1 July 2024	
MF	(Spain) Unai Vencedor	Athletic Club	Loan return	1 July 2024	
MF	(United States) Konrad de la Fuente	(France) Olympique Marseille	Loan return	1 July 2024	
MF	(Spain) Stoichkov	Deportivo Alavés	€1,000,000	17 July 2024	
GK	(Algeria) Luca Zidane	Granada	€500,000	24 July 2024	
DF	(Spain) Juan Berrocal	Getafe	€2,220,000	19 August 2024	
MF	(France) Yanis Rahmani	Málaga	Contract termination	28 August 2024	
GK	(Brazil) Daniel Fuzato	(Brazil) Vasco da Gama	Free	7 January 2025	
DF	(Japan) Kento Hashimoto	(Japan) Tokyo	Free	9 January 2025	

=== Loaned in ===
Pos.	Player	Transferred from	Date	Date until	Source
FW	(Spain) Jorge Pascual	Villarreal	6 July 2024	End season	
MF	(Spain) Iván Gil	Las Palmas	3 January 2025	End season	
GK	(Spain) Álex Domínguez	(France) Toulouse	16 January 2025	End season	
DF	(Spain) Arnau Comas	(Switzerland) Basel	31 January 2025	End season	

=== Loaned out ===
Pos.	Player	Transferred to	Date	Date until	Source
MF	(Venezuela) Jorge Yriarte	Real Murcia	26 July 2024	End season	
FW	(Bulgaria) Slavy	Villarreal B	7 January 2025	End season	

=== Released ===
Pos.	Player	Date	Subsequent club	Date join	Source
DF	(Spain) José Antonio Ríos	30 June 2024	Cartagena	1 July 2024	
GK	(Spain) Yoel Rodríguez	30 June 2024	Racing Ferrol	2 July 2024	
DF	(Portugal) Frederico Venâncio	30 June 2024	(Portugal) Santa Clara	18 July 2024	
MF	(Spain) Ager Aketxe	30 June 2024	Real Zaragoza	7 August 2024	
DF	(Spain) Álvaro Tejero	30 June 2024	Espanyol	9 August 2024	
FW	(Spain) Quique González	30 June 2024	Ibiza	27 August 2024	
DF	(Spain) Rober Correa	30 June 2024	Racing Ferrol	3 September 2024	
FW	(Spain) Sergio León	30 June 2024	Atlético Palma del Río	17 September 2024	
FW	(Morocco) Yacine Qasmi	30 June 2024	Alcoyano	16 November 2024	
DF	(Czech Republic) Stefan Simić	30 June 2024	Karmiotissa		

=== New contracts ===
Pos.	Player	Date	Contract until	Source
MF	(Spain) Ander Madariaga	31 July 2024	2026	
MF	(Spain) Ángel Troncho	26 September 2024	2027	
DF	(Spain) Sergio Cubero	14 May 2025	2027	
FW	(Spain) Jon Bautista	23 May 2025	2028	
DF	(Spain) Anaitz Arbilla	31 May 2025	2026	

== Friendlies ==
=== Pre-season ===
20 July 2024 Friendly	Eibar	1–1	Real Unión	Zarautz
11:30	Endika 62'		Benito 54'	Stadium: Asti

24 July 2024 Friendly	Eibar	3–0	Barakaldo
18:00

27 July 2024 Friendly	Racing Santander	0–0	Eibar
12:00

3 August 2024 Friendly	Eibar	1–2	Sporting Gijón
18:00

== Competitions ==
=== Overall record ===
Competition	First match	Last match	Starting round	Final position	Record							
Competition	First match	Last match	Starting round	Final position	Pld	W	D	L	GF	GA	GD	Win %
Segunda División	17 August 2024	1 June 2025	Matchday 1	9th	42	15	13	14	44	41	+3	35.71
Copa del Rey	30 October 2024		First round	First round	1	0	0	1	0	1	−1	0.00
Total					43	15	13	15	44	42	+2	34.88

Last updated: 1 June 2025
Source: Soccerway

=== Segunda División ===
==== League table ====
Pos	Team	Pld	W	D	L	GF	GA	GD	Pts
7	Granada	42	18	11	13	65	54	+11	65
8	Huesca	42	18	10	14	58	49	+9	64
9	Eibar	42	15	13	14	44	41	+3	58 (Note: Eibar finished ahead of Albacete on head-to-head points: Albacete 0–1 Eibar, Eibar 1–1 Albacete.)
10	Albacete	42	15	13	14	57	57	0	58
11	Sporting Gijón	42	14	14	14	57	54	+3	56

Source: LaLiga Hypermotion
Rules for classification: 1) Points; 2) Head-to-head points; 3) Head-to-head goal difference; 4) Goal difference; 5) Goals scored; 6) Fair-play points
(Note: Head-to-head record is used only after all the matches between the teams in question have been played)

==== Results summary ====
Overall								Home						Away					
Pld	W	D	L	GF	GA	GD	Pts	W	D	L	GF	GA	GD	W	D	L	GF	GA	GD
42	15	13	14	44	41	+3	58	11	6	4	27	19	+8	4	7	10	17	22	−5

Last updated: 29 September 2024.

==== Results by round ====
Round	1	2	3	4	5	6	7	8	9	10	11	12	13	14	15	16	17	18	19	20	21	22	23	24	25	26	27	28	29	30	31	32	33	34	35	36	37	38	39	40	41	42
Ground	H	A	H	A	H	A	A	H	H	A	H	A	H	A	H	A	H	A	H	A	H	A	H	A	H	A	A	H	A	H	A	H	A	H	A	H	A	H	A	H	H	A
Result	W	D	D	W	W	D	L	L	W	L	W	L	L	L	W	L	W	L	W	L	D	W	D	L	L	D	L	D	W	W	D	W	D	D	D	D	D	L	W	W	W	L
Position	6	6	5	4	3	5	7	9	7	10	7	11	11	13	11	12	11	13	11	12	13	11	10	11	13	14	17	16	15	13	14	12	13	13	12	12	13	15	13	9	9	9
Points	3	4	5	8	11	12	12	12	15	15	18	18	18	18	21	21	24	24	27	27	28	31	32	32	32	33	33	34	37	40	41	44	45	46	47	48	49	49	52	55	58	58

Updated to match(es) played on 29 September 2024. Source:
A = Away; H = Home; W = Win; D = Draw; L = Loss

==== Matches ====
The match schedule was released on 26 June 2024.

17 August 2024 1	Eibar	1–0	Castellón	Eibar
17:00	Bautista 2'; Arbilla (yellow card) 15'; Guruzeta (yellow card) 25'; Merquelanz (yellow card) 54'; Nolaskoain (yellow card) 78'	Report	Alberto (yellow card) 81'	Stadium: Ipurua; Attendance: 3,538; Referee: Eder Mallo Fernández

23 August 2024 2	Racing Santander	2–2	Eibar	Santander
19:00	P. Rodríguez (yellow card) 56'; A. Martín (yellow card) 84', (goal) 90+2' (pen.); Suleiman 86'; Sangalli (yellow card) 90+9'	Report	Puertas 27'; Carillo 56'; Corpas (yellow card) 68'; Nolaskoain (yellow card) 84'	Stadium: El Sardinero; Attendance: 19,205; Referee: José Antonio Sánchez Villalobos

2 September 2024 3	Eibar	2–2	Levante	Eibar
19:00	Puertas 47', 90+2'; Bautista (yellow card) 53'; Matheus (yellow card) 90+2'	Report	Brugi 4', (yellow card) 77'; Romero 79'; Rey (yellow card) 90+7'	Stadium: Ipurua; Attendance: 5,585; Referee: Miguel Sesma Espinosa

9 September 2024 4	Albacete	0–1	Eibar	Albacete
21:00	Quiles (yellow card) 48'; Marchán (yellow card) 90+3'	Report	Lizoain 18' (o.g.); Toni (yellow card) 36'; Bautista (yellow card) 69'	Stadium: Carlos Belmonte; Attendance: 10,433; Referee: Sergiu Claudiu Mureșan

14 September 2024 5	Eibar	1–0	Tenerife	Eibar
16:15	Matheus (yellow card) 43'; Nolaskoain 46'	Report	Gallego (yellow card) 67'; Marlos (yellow card) 90+5'	Stadium: Ipurua; Attendance: 5,030; Referee: Álvaro Moreno Aragón

22 September 2024 6	Almería	2–2	Eibar	Almería
21:00	Melamed 57', (yellow card) 75'; E. González (yellow card) 69'; Fettal 80'; Lopy (yellow card) 90+3'; Chumi (yellow card) 90+6'	Report	González 25' (o.g.); Arbilla (yellow card) 37'; Alkain 55'; Álvarez (yellow card) 70' (yellow-red card) 90+5'; Corpas (yellow card) 82'	Stadium: UD Almería Stadium; Attendance: 10,811; Referee: Dámaso Arcediano Monescillo

29 September 2024 7	Oviedo	1–0	Eibar	Oviedo
18:30	Alemão 47'; Calvo (yellow card) 71'	Report	Arambarri (yellow card) 16' (yellow-red card) 83'	Stadium: Carlos Tartiere; Attendance: 19,281; Referee: Rafael Sánchez López

6 October 2024 8	Eibar	1–3	Sporting Gijón	Eibar
16:15	Bautista 18'; Pascual (yellow card) 34'; Matheus (yellow card) 45+4'; Chema (yellow card) 65'; Arbilla (yellow card) 78'	Report	Dubasin 29'; Corpas 39' (o.g.); Olaetxea (yellow card) 43'; Gelabert (yellow card) 45+4'; Maraš (yellow card) 65'; Campos (yellow card) 72', (goal) 90+5'; Caicedo (yellow card) 76'	Stadium: Ipurua; Attendance: 5,960; Referee: Iosu Galech Apezteguía

12 October 2024 9	Eibar	1–0	Eldense	Eibar
18:30	Bautista 36'; Hashimoto (yellow card) 90'	Report		Stadium: Ipurua; Attendance: 5,097; Referee: Eder Mallo Fernández

19 October 2024 10	Mirandés	1–0	Eibar	Miranda de Ebro
21:00	Panichelli 26'; Parada (yellow card) 44'; Izeta (yellow card) 85'	Report	Chema (yellow card) 30'; Merquelanz (yellow card) 73'; Arbilla (yellow card) 79' (yellow-red card) 82'; Puertas (yellow card) 90+6'	Stadium: Anduva; Attendance: 3,770; Referee: Andrés Fuentes Molina

23 October 2024 11	Eibar	1–0	Cádiz	Eibar
19:00	Carillo (yellow card) 19'; Corpas 31'; Puertas (yellow card) 51'; Toni (yellow card) 65'; Chema (yellow card) 69'	Report	De la Rosa (yellow card) 15'; Alejo (yellow card) 45'; Fali (yellow card) 60'; Ontiveros (yellow card) 64'; Kouamé (yellow card) 78'	Stadium: Ipurua; Attendance: 5,100; Referee: Salvador Lax Franco
Note: Fali received a red card as an unused substitute.

27 October 2024 12	Málaga	1–0	Eibar	Málaga
14:00	Larrubia 15'; Luismi (yellow card) 47'	Report	Corpas (yellow card) 53'; Cristian (yellow card) 58'; Toni (yellow card) 84'; Carillo (yellow card) 90'	Stadium: La Rosaleda; Attendance: 24,008; Referee: Manuel Ángel Pérez Hernández

2 November 2024 13	Eibar	0–2	Elche	Eibar
14:00	Nolaskoain (yellow card) 13'; Corpas (yellow card) 58'; S. Álvarez (yellow card) 86'	Report	A. Álvarez 41'; Mourad 45'	Stadium: Ipurua; Attendance: 4,388; Referee: Rafael Sánchez López

11 November 2024 14	Deportivo La Coruña	1–0	Eibar	A Coruña
20:30	Obrador (yellow card) 80'; Soriano 90+1'	Report	Guruzeta (yellow card) 75'; Carillo (yellow card) 90+3'	Stadium: Riazor; Attendance: 19,980; Referee: José Antonio Sánchez Villalobos

16 November 2024 15	Eibar	2–0	Racing Ferrol	Eibar
14:00	Corpas (yellow card) 39'; Pascual 46', 67'; Chema (yellow card) 85'	Report	Castro (yellow card) 62'	Stadium: Ipurua; Attendance: 4,321; Referee: Marta Huerta de Aza

23 November 2024 16	Burgos	1–0	Eibar	Burgos
18:30	Morante (yellow card) 53'; Ojeda (yellow card) 61'; Curro 67'	Report	S. Álvarez (yellow card) 36'; Pascual (yellow card) 59'; Bautista (yellow card) 60'; Alkain (yellow card) 78'	Stadium: El Plantío; Attendance: 9,150; Referee: Miguel González Díaz

2 December 2024 17	Eibar	1–0	Cartagena	Eibar
20:30	Pascual 27'	Report	Alcalá (yellow card) 73'	Stadium: Ipurua; Attendance: 4,029; Referee: Andrés Fuentes Molina

7 December 2024 18	Huesca	2–1	Eibar	Huesca
18:30	J. Hernández (yellow card) 12'; Soko 39'; Vilarrasa (yellow card) 52'; Sielva 78' (pen.); Blasco (yellow card) 90+4'	Report	Pascual 9'; Álvarez (yellow card) 43'; Corpas (yellow card) 66', (penalty missed) 90+5'; Carrillo (yellow card) 90+2'	Stadium: El Alcoraz; Attendance: 3,660; Referee: Álvaro Moreno Aragón

14 December 2024 19	Eibar	2–1	Real Zaragoza	Eibar
18:30	Puertas 21'; Mada 56'; Chema (yellow card) 61'; Matheus (yellow card) 63'; Puertas (yellow card) 69'	Report	Adu Ares (yellow card) 26'; Jair (yellow card) 36'; Liso 80'; Sans (yellow card) 80'; Calero (yellow card) 82'	Stadium: Ipurua; Attendance: 4,779; Referee: Sergiu Claudiu Mureșan

17 December 2024 20	Córdoba	2–1	Eibar	Córdoba
21:15	Casa 17', (yellow card) 45+2'; T. Zidane (yellow card) 31'; Martínez (yellow card) 75'; Adilson 87'; Calderón (yellow card) 90+2'; Genaro (yellow card) 90+4'	Report	Carrillo (yellow card) 2'; Nolaskoain 19'; Puertas (yellow card) 90'; Alkain (yellow card) 90+4'	Stadium: Nuevo Arcángel; Attendance: 15,633; Referee: Marta Huerta de Aza

21 December 2024 21	Eibar	1–1	Granada	Eibar
14:00	Puertas 15', (yellow card) 45+3'	Report	Insua (yellow card) 29', (goal) 82'; Hongla (red card) 64'	Stadium: Ipurua; Attendance: 4,140; Referee: Rubén Ávalos Barrera

14 January 2025 22	Eldense	1–3	Eibar	Elda
20:30	Masca 13'; Mackay (yellow card) 63'	Report	Corpas 58' (pen.); Mada 62'; Magunagoitia (yellow card) 72'; Guruzeta 90+6'	Stadium: Nuevo Pepico Amat; Attendance: 3,846; Referee: Manuel Jesús Orellana Cid

18 January 2025 23	Eibar	1–1	Albacete	Eibar
18:30	Mada 4'; J. Martínez (yellow card) 40'; Puertas (yellow card) 44'; Corpas (yellow card) 56'; Guruzeta (yellow card) 87'; Nolaskoain (yellow card) 90+3'	Report	Villar (yellow card) 3'; Rueda 49', (yellow card) 89'; Touaizi (yellow card) 90+3'	Stadium: Ipurua; Attendance: 5,308; Referee: José Antonio Sánchez Villalobos

24 January 2025 24	Elche	2–0	Eibar	Elche
20:30	Kaba 45'; Castro 74'	Report	Carillo (yellow card) 59' (yellow-red card) 72'	Stadium: Martínez Valero; Attendance: 18,211; Referee: Iosu Galech Apezteguía

2 February 2025 25	Eibar	0–1	Deportivo La Coruña	Eibar
16:15	Bautista (yellow card) 90+2'	Report	Navarro 30'	Stadium: Ipurua; Attendance: 6,102; Referee: Manuel Ángel Pérez Hernández

8 February 2025 26	Sporting Gijón	0–0	Eibar	Gijón
18:30	Maraš (yellow card) 34'; García (yellow card) 36'	Report	Arambarri (yellow card) 18'; Carillo (yellow card) 45' (yellow-red card) 52'; Arbilla (yellow card) 68'; Puertas (yellow card) 90+4'	Stadium: El Molinón; Attendance: 21,558; Referee: Rubén Ávalos Barrera

15 February 2025 27	Castellón	2–0	Eibar	Castellón
14:00	van den Belt 18', (yellow card) 90+3'; Sánchez 57'	Report	Mada (yellow card) 9'; Arrillaga (yellow card) 47'; Matheus (yellow card) 53'; Arambarri (yellow card) 71'	Stadium: Castalia; Attendance: 10,075; Referee: Miguel González Díaz

22 February 2025 28	Eibar	2–2	Racing Santander	Eibar
16:15	Pascual (yellow card) 4'; Bautista 10', 62'; Nolaskoain (yellow card) 38'; Arambarri (yellow card) 53'; Mada (yellow card) 76'	Report	Arana 31'; Montero (yellow card) 34'; Martín 78'	Stadium: Ipurua; Attendance: 6,307; Referee: Miguel Sesma Espinosa

28 February 2025 29	Cartagena	0–2	Eibar	Cartagena
20:30	Escriche (yellow card) 31'; El Jebari (yellow card) 67'; Ndiaye (yellow card) 76'	Report	Pascual 24'; Cuñat 27' (o.g.)	Stadium: Cartagonova; Attendance: 2,788; Referee: Marta Huerta de Aza

7 March 2025 30	Eibar	1–0	Almería	Eibar
19:00	Matheus 6'; Corpas (yellow card) 52'	Report	Radovanović (yellow card) 64'; Lopy (yellow card) 69'; Marezi (yellow card) 73'	Stadium: Ipurua; Attendance: 5,194; Referee: Sergiu Claudiu Mureșan

15 March 2025 31	Racing Ferrol	0–0	Eibar	Ferrol
14:00	Señe (yellow card) 44'; Castro (yellow card) 57'; Purić (yellow card) 64'	Report	Cubero (yellow card) 15'; Matheus (yellow card) 39'; Comas (yellow card) 55'	Stadium: Municipal de A Malata; Attendance: 4,281; Referee: Manuel Jesús Orellana Cid

23 March 2025 32	Eibar	2–1	Huesca	Eibar
16:15	Bautista 51'; Corpas 56'; Matheus (yellow card) 67'	Report	Chatiliez 78'	Stadium: Ipurua; Attendance: 5,811; Referee: Saúl Ais Reig

31 March 2025 33	Cádiz	0–0	Eibar	Cádiz
20:30		Report	Corpas (yellow card) 27'; Arbilla (yellow card) 28'; Arambarri (yellow card) 58'; Bautista (yellow card) 87'	Stadium: Nuevo Mirandilla; Attendance: 13,817; Referee: Salvador Lax Franco

5 April 2025 34	Eibar	1–1	Real Oviedo	Eibar
16:15	Martínez (yellow card) 24'; Nolaskoain (yellow card) 36'; Matheus (yellow card) 37'; Corpas (yellow card) 61'; Gil (yellow card) 81'; Magunagoitia 90+5'	Report	Sibo (yellow card) 26'; Seoane (yellow card) 28'; Luengo (yellow card) 42'; Alemão 64'; de la Hoz (yellow card) 84'; Viñas (yellow card) 88'; Vidal (yellow card) 90+5'	Stadium: Ipurua; Attendance: 5,888; Referee: Germán Cid Camacho

12 April 2025 35	Real Zaragoza	2–2	Eibar	Zaragoza
16:15	Arriaga (yellow card) 51'; Jair 72'; Tasende (yellow card) 76'; Poussin 90+3'	Report	Bautista 30', 33'; Arbilla (yellow card) 51'; Nolaskoain (yellow card) 90+1'	Stadium: La Romareda; Attendance: 21,181; Referee: José Luis Guzmán Mansilla

21 April 2025 36	Eibar	2–2	Málaga	Eibar
20:30	Gil (yellow card) 24'; Puertas (yellow card) 37'; Bautista 45+3'; Monte 71' (o.g.); Matheus (yellow card) 90+7'	Report	Galilea (yellow card) 20'; Murillo 60'; Rafa 70'	Stadium: Ipurua; Attendance: 4,396; Referee: Dámaso Arcediano Monescillo

27 April 2025 37	Tenerife	1–1	Eibar	Santa Cruz de Tenerife
18:30	Rodríguez (yellow card) 36'; González (yellow card) 71'; Gallego 83'; Cantero (yellow card) 90+6'	Report	Guruzeta 13'; Nolaskoain (yellow card) 45+2'; Corpas (yellow card) 45+3'	Stadium: Heliodoro Rodríguez López; Attendance: 14,128; Referee: José Antonio Sánchez Villalobos

3 May 2025 38	Eibar	0–1	Mirandés	Eibar
18:30	Bautista (red card) 34'; Guruzeta (yellow card) 39'; Arambarri (yellow card) 89'; Arbilla (yellow card) 90+2'; Chema (yellow card) 90+4' (yellow-red card) 90+6'	Report	Juan (yellow card) 28'; Panichelli 90'	Stadium: Ipurua; Attendance: 5,580; Referee: Saúl Ais Reig

12 May 2025 39	Granada	0–2	Eibar	Granada
20:30	Brau (yellow card) 84'	Report	Corpas 61'; Arbilla (yellow card) 63'; Guruzeta 68'	Stadium: Los Cármenes; Attendance: 14,923; Referee: Marta Huerta de Aza

17 May 2025 40	Eibar	1–0	Burgos	Eibar
16:15	Corpas 37' (pen.)	Report	Sancris (yellow card) 57'; Córdoba (yellow card) 59'; Grego (red card) 88'; F. Miguel (yellow card) 90+1'	Stadium: Ipurua; Attendance: 4,401; Referee: Miguel González Díaz

25 May 2025 41	Eibar	4–1	Córdoba	Eibar
18:30	Corpas (yellow card) 37', (goal) 41'; Chema (yellow card) 48', (goal) 90'; Bautista 67', 79'	Report	Marvel (yellow card) 43'; Albarrán (yellow card) 59'; T. Zidane (yellow card) 63'; Obolskiy 65'; Corbo (yellow card) 90'	Stadium: Ipurua; Attendance: 4,467; Referee: Salvador Lax Franco

1 June 2025 42	Levante	1–0	Eibar	Valencia
18:30	Dela 83' (pen.)	Report	Gil (yellow card) 35'; Chema (yellow card) 81'	Stadium: Ciutat de València; Attendance: 22,623; Referee: Muñiz Muñoz

=== Copa del Rey ===
30 October 2024 Round 1	Logroñés	1–0 (a.e.t.)	Eibar	Logroño
20:00	Sarriegi (yellow card) 35'; Moreno (yellow card) 100'; Arnau 108'	Report	Giménez (yellow card) 59'; Slavy (yellow card) 91'; Cubero (red card) 118'	Stadium: Las Gaunas; Attendance: 3,422; Referee: Óliver de la Fuente Ramos

== Statistics ==
No.	Players	Segunda División		Copa del Rey		Total			
No.	Players	Apps	Goals	Apps	Goals	Apps	Goals	Yellow card	Red card
Goalkeepers
1	(Brazil) Daniel Fuzato	10	0	-		10	0	0	0
13	(Spain) Jonmi Magunagoitia	32	1	1	0	33	1	1	0
Defenders
2	(Spain) Sergio Cubero	21+6	0	1	0	28	0	1	1
3	(Spain) Cristian Gutiérrez	25+7	0	1	0	33	0	1	0
4	(Spain) Álvaro Carrillo	15+6	1	-		21	1	5	2
5	(Spain) Chema	9+4	1	-		13	1	8	1
14	(Spain) Hodei Arrillaga	3+14	0	-		17	0	1	0
15	(Spain) Arnau Comas	9	0	-		9	0	1	0
15	(Japan) Kento Hashimoto	1+6	0	1	0	8	0	2	0
22	(Spain) Aritz Arambarri	27+5	0	1	0	33	0	4	1
23	(Spain) Anaitz Arbilla	26	0	-		26	0	8	1
28	(Spain) Iker Alday	0+1	0	-		1	0	0	0
33	(Spain) Raul Giménez	0	0	1	0	1	0	0	0
34	(Spain) Oier Llorente	0	0	0+1	0	1	0	0	0
Midfielder
6	(Spain) Sergio Álvarez	28+10	0	-		38	0	3	1
8	(Spain) Peru Nolaskoain	27+9	2	0+1	0	37	2	8	0
10	(Brazil) Matheus Pereira	27+5	1	-		32	1	10	0
12	(Spain) Iván Gil	6+5	0	-		11	0	3	0
17	(Spain) José Corpas	34	6	-		34	6	12	0
18	(Spain) Martín Merquelanz	5+10	0	0+1	0	16	0	2	0
20	(Spain) Antonio Puertas	29+12	5	0+1	0	42	5	6	0
21	(Spain) Jon Guruzeta	16+17	3	1	0	34	3	4	0
24	(Spain) Javi Martínez	7+9	0	-		16	0	2	0
29	(Spain) Ander Madariaga	0+13	3	-		13	3	2	0
35	(Spain) Óscar Carrasco	0+3	0	1	0	4	0	0	0
Forward
7	(Spain) Xeber Alkain	20+13	1	-		33	1	2	0
9	(Spain) Jon Bautista	31+6	11	-		37	11	5	1
11	(Spain) Jorge Pascual	23+17	5	1	0	41	5	4	0
19	(Spain) Toni Villa	4+12	0	1	0	17	0	3	0
27	(Bulgaria) Slavy	0+5	0	1	0	6	0	0	0
32	(Spain) Aitor Galarza	0+5	0	-		5	0	0	0
