= 2022–23 SD Eibar season =

SD Eibar
2022–23 season
- President: Amaia Gorostiza
- Head coach: Gaizka Garitano
- Stadium: Ipurua Municipal Stadium
- Segunda División: 5th
- Copa del Rey: Second round
- Top goalscorer: League: Stoichkov (12); All: Stoichkov (13)
| Home colours | Away colours |

The 2022–23 season was the 83rd season in the history of SD Eibar and their second consecutive season in the second division. The club are participating in Segunda División and the Copa del Rey.

== Players ==
As of 3 March 2023

Note: Flags indicate national team as defined under FIFA eligibility rules; some limited exceptions apply. Players may hold more than one non-FIFA nationality.

| No. | Pos. | Nation | Player |
|---|---|---|---|
| 1 | GK | ESP | Ander Cantero |
| 2 | DF | ESP | Chema Rodríguez |
| 3 | DF | POR | Frederico Venâncio |
| 4 | DF | ESP | Rober Correa |
| 5 | DF | ESP | Juan Berrocal |
| 6 | MF | ESP | Sergio Álvarez |
| 7 | FW | ESP | Quique González |
| 8 | MF | BRA | Matheus Pereira |
| 9 | FW | ARG | Gustavo Blanco Leschuk |
| 10 | MF | ESP | Ager Aketxe |
| 11 | MF | FRA | Yanis Rahmani |
| 13 | GK | ESP | Yoel Rodríguez |
| 14 | MF | ESP | Javi Muñoz |

| No. | Pos. | Nation | Player |
|---|---|---|---|
| 15 | DF | ESP | Álvaro Tejero |
| 16 | DF | ESP | Ríos Reina |
| 17 | MF | ESP | José Corpas |
| 18 | FW | ESP | Jon Bautista |
| 19 | FW | ESP | Stoichkov |
| 20 | FW | ESP | Juan Carlos Arana |
| 21 | FW | ESP | Álvaro Vadillo (on loan from Espanyol) |
| 22 | MF | ESP | Peru Nolaskoain (on loan from Athletic Bilbao) |
| 23 | DF | ESP | Anaitz Arbilla (captain) |
| 24 | DF | ESP | Daniel Lasure |
| 25 | GK | FRA | Luca Zidane |
| 30 | DF | ESP | Imanol García de Albéniz (on loan from Athletic Bilbao) |

=== Reserve team ===
Note: Flags indicate national team as defined under FIFA eligibility rules; some limited exceptions apply. Players may hold more than one non-FIFA nationality.

| No. | Pos. | Nation | Player |
|---|---|---|---|
| 27 | MF | ESP | Oscar Carrasco |
| 28 | DF | ESP | Iker Alday |
| 31 | MF | ESP | Ángel Troncho |

| No. | Pos. | Nation | Player |
|---|---|---|---|
| 32 | DF | ESP | Aritz Muguruza |
| 33 | DF | ESP | Hodei Arrillaga |
| 34 | DF | ESP | Markel Arana |

=== On loan ===
Note: Flags indicate national team as defined under FIFA eligibility rules; some limited exceptions apply. Players may hold more than one non-FIFA nationality.

| No. | Pos. | Nation | Player |
|---|---|---|---|
| — | DF | ESP | Sergio Cubero (at Fuenlabrada until 30 June 2023) |
| — | MF | ARG | Franchu (at Cartagena until 30 June 2023) |
| — | MF | ESP | Óscar Sielva (at Huesca until 30 June 2023) |

| No. | Pos. | Nation | Player |
|---|---|---|---|
| — | MF | VEN | Jorge Yriarte (at Amorebieta until 30 June 2023) |
| — | FW | ESP | Urko Izeta (at Amorebieta until 30 June 2023) |

== Transfers ==
=== In ===
| Date | Player | From | Type | Fee | Ref |
|---|---|---|---|---|---|
| 1 July 2022 | (Spain) Ríos Reina | Ponferradina | Transfer | Free | |
| 11 July 2022 | (Spain) Juan Berrocal | Sevilla | Transfer | Undisclosed | |
| 12 July 2022 | (Brazil) Matheus Pereira | Barcelona B | Transfer | Undisclosed | |
| 14 July 2022 | (Spain) Imanon García | Athletic Bilbao | Loan | | |
| 21 July 2022 | (Spain) Chema | Getafe | Transfer | Free | |
| 22 July 2022 | (Spain) Jon Bautista | Real Sociedad | Transfer | Undisclosed | |
| 22 July 2022 | (Spain) Álvaro Vadillo | Espanyol | Loan | | |
| 16 August 2022 | (Argentina) Blanco Leschuk | (Turkey) Antalyaspor | Transfer | Undisclosed | |
| 26 August 2022 | (Spain) Peru Nolaskoain | Athletic Bilbao | Loan | | |
| 1 September 2022 | (France) Luca Zidane | Rayo Vallecano | Transfer | Free | |

=== Out ===
| Date | Player | To | Type | Fee | Ref |
|---|---|---|---|---|---|
| 8 July 2022 | (Spain) Miguel Atienza | Burgos | Transfer | Undisclosed | |
| 28 July 2022 | (Argentina) Franchu | Cartagena | Loan | | |
| 5 August 2022 | (Spain) Óscar Sielva | Huesca | Loan | | |
| 8 August 2022 | (Spain) Edu Expósito | Espanyol | Transfer | Undisclosed | |
| 17 August 2022 | (Spain) Sergio Cubero | Fuenlabrada | Loan | | |
| 31 August 2022 | (Spain) Antonio Glauder | Albacete | Transfer | Undisclosed | |

== Pre-season and friendlies ==
Win Draw Loss Fixtures

| 16 July 2022 Friendly | Calahorra | 0–2 | Eibar |
| CEST (UTC+2) |

| 20 July 2022 Friendly | Athletic Bilbao B | 0–1 | Eibar |
| CEST (UTC+2) |

| 23 July 2022 Friendly | Oviedo | 0–0 | Eibar |
| CEST (UTC+2) |

| 29 July 2022 Friendly | Eibar | 5–2 | Amorebieta |
| CEST (UTC+2) |

| 30 July 2022 Friendly | Huesca | 1–3 | Eibar |
| CEST (UTC+2) |

| 3 August 2022 Friendly | Eibar | 2–1 | UD Logroñés |
| CEST (UTC+2) |

| 5 August 2022 Friendly | Real Sociedad | 1–2 | Eibar |
| CEST (UTC+2) |

== Competitions ==
=== Overall record ===
| Competition | First match | Last match | Starting round | Final position | Record | | | | | | | |
| Competition | First match | Last match | Starting round | Final position | Pld | W | D | L | GF | GA | GD | Win % |
|---|---|---|---|---|---|---|---|---|---|---|---|---|
| Segunda División | 13 August 2022 | 27 May 2023 | Matchday 1 | 5th | 42 | 19 | 14 | 9 | 45 | 36 | +9 | 45.24 |
| Segunda División promotion play-offs | 3 June 2023 | 8 June 2023 | Semi-finals | Semi-finals | 2 | 0 | 1 | 1 | 1 | 3 | −2 | 0.00 |
| Copa del Rey | 13 November 2022 | 21 December 2022 | First round | Second round | 2 | 1 | 0 | 1 | 3 | 1 | +2 | 50.00 |
| Total | | | | | 46 | 20 | 15 | 11 | 49 | 40 | +9 | 43.48 |

Source: Soccerway

=== Segunda División ===
==== League table ====
| Pos | Team | Pld | W | D | L | GF | GA | GD | Pts | Qualification or relegation |
|---|---|---|---|---|---|---|---|---|---|---|
| 3 | Levante | 42 | 18 | 18 | 6 | 46 | 30 | +16 | 72 (Note: Overall goal difference: Las Palmas +20, Levante +16.) | Qualification for promotion play-offs |
| 4 | Alavés (O, P) | 42 | 19 | 14 | 9 | 47 | 33 | +14 | 71 (Note: Alavés finished ahead of Eibar on head-to-head points: Eibar 0–0 Alavés, Alavés 2–0 Eibar.) | Qualification for promotion play-offs |
| 5 | Eibar | 42 | 19 | 14 | 9 | 45 | 36 | +9 | 71 | Qualification for promotion play-offs |
| 6 | Albacete | 42 | 17 | 16 | 9 | 58 | 47 | +11 | 67 | Qualification for promotion play-offs |
| 7 | Andorra | 42 | 16 | 11 | 15 | 47 | 37 | +10 | 59 (Note: Andorra finished ahead of Oviedo on head-to-head points: Oviedo 0–1 Andorra, Andorra 3–1 Oviedo.) | |

Source: LaLiga SmartBank
Rules for classification: 1) points; 2) head-to-head points; 3) head-to-head goal difference; 4) goal difference; 5) number of goals scored
(O) Play-off winners; (P) Promoted
Notes:

Notes

1. Reserve teams are not eligible for promotion to the same league as the first team.

==== Results summary ====
| Overall | | | | | | | | Home | | | | | | Away | | | | | |
| Pld | W | D | L | GF | GA | GD | Pts | W | D | L | GF | GA | GD | W | D | L | GF | GA | GD |
|---|---|---|---|---|---|---|---|---|---|---|---|---|---|---|---|---|---|---|---|
| 42 | 19 | 14 | 9 | 45 | 36 | +9 | 71 | 11 | 8 | 2 | 24 | 13 | +11 | 8 | 6 | 7 | 21 | 23 | −2 |

Source: LaLiga SmartBank

==== Results by round ====
| Round | 1 | 2 | 3 | 4 | 5 | 6 | 7 | 8 | 9 | 10 | 11 | 12 | 13 | 14 | 15 |
|---|---|---|---|---|---|---|---|---|---|---|---|---|---|---|---|
| Ground | H | A | H | A | H | A | H | A | H | A | A | H | A | H | A |
| Result | W | D | W | L | W | L | W | D | D | W | L | D | W | W | D |
| Position | | | | | | | | | | | | | | | |

Source: LaLiga SmartBank
A = Away; H = Home; W = Win; D = Draw; L = Loss

==== Matches ====
The league fixtures were announced on 23 June 2022.

| 13 August 2022 1 | Eibar | 2–1 | Tenerife | Eibar |
| CEST (UTC+2) | | | | Stadium: Ipurua Municipal Stadium |

| 19 August 2022 2 | Villarreal B | 2–2 | Eibar | Villarreal |
| CEST (UTC+2) |

| 28 August 2022 3 | Eibar | 1–0 | Ponferradina | Eibar |
| CEST (UTC+2) | | | | Stadium: Ipurua Municipal Stadium |

| 2 September 2022 4 | Leganés | 2–1 | Eibar | Leganés |
| CEST (UTC+2) |

| 12 September 2022 5 | Eibar | 4–0 | Granada | Eibar |
| CEST (UTC+2) | | | | Stadium: Ipurua Municipal Stadium |

| 17 September 2022 6 | Andorra | 2–0 | Eibar | Andorra la Vella |
| CEST (UTC+2) |

| 25 September 2022 7 | Eibar | 2–1 | Racing Santander | Eibar |
| CEST (UTC+2) | | | | Stadium: Ipurua Municipal Stadium |

| 3 October 2022 8 | Zaragoza | 0–0 | Eibar | Zaragoza |
| CEST (UTC+2) |

| 10 October 2022 9 | Eibar | 0–0 | Mirandés | Eibar |
| CEST (UTC+2) | | | | Stadium: Ipurua Municipal Stadium |

| 13 October 2022 10 | Ibiza | 1–2 | Eibar | Ibiza |
| CEST (UTC+2) |

| 17 October 2022 11 | Sporting Gijón | 2–0 | Eibar | Gijón |
| CEST (UTC+2) | | | | Stadium: El Molinón |

| 23 October 2022 12 | Eibar | 1–1 | Albacete | Eibar |
| CEST (UTC+2) | | | | Stadium: Ipurua Municipal Stadium |

| 30 October 2022 13 | Málaga | 0–1 | Eibar | Málaga |
| CEST (UTC+2) | | | | Stadium: La Rosaleda |

| 2 November 2022 14 | Eibar | 1–0 | Lugo | Eibar |
| CET (UTC+1) | | | | Stadium: Ipurua Municipal Stadium |

| 6 November 2022 15 | Las Palmas | 1–1 | Eibar | Las Palmas |
| CET (UTC+1) |

| 20 November 2022 16 | Eibar | 0–0 | Alavés | Eibar |
| | | | | Stadium: Ipurua Municipal Stadium |

| 27 November 2022 17 | Cartagena | 2–1 | Eibar | Cartagena |

| 4 December 2022 18 | Eibar | 2–1 | Huesca | Eibar |
| | | | | Stadium: Ipurua Municipal Stadium |

| 8 December 2022 19 | Burgos | 1–2 | Eibar | Burgos |

| 11 December 2022 20 | Eibar | 1–0 | Oviedo | Eibar |
| | | | | Stadium: Ipurua Municipal Stadium |

| 18 December 2022 21 | Levante | 0–0 | Eibar | Valencia |

| 8 January 2023 22 | Eibar | 1–0 | Ibiza | Eibar |
| | | | | Stadium: Ipurua Municipal Stadium |

| 15 January 2023 23 | Eibar | 2–1 | Málaga | Eibar |
| | | | | Stadium: Ipurua Municipal Stadium |

| 21 January 2023 24 | Ponferradina | 0–1 | Eibar | Ponferrada |

| 28 January 2023 25 | Eibar | 0–0 | Leganés | Eibar |
| | | | | Stadium: Ipurua Municipal Stadium |

| 4 February 2023 26 | Alavés | 2–0 | Eibar | Vitoria-Gasteiz |

| 12 February 2023 27 | Eibar | 0–3 | Cartagena | Eibar |
| | | | | Stadium: Ipurua Municipal Stadium |

| 18 February 2023 28 | Lugo | 0–2 | Eibar | Lugo |

| 24 February 2023 29 | Eibar | 2–0 | Villarreal B | Eibar |
| | | | | Stadium: Ipurua Municipal Stadium |

| 4 March 2023 30 | Tenerife | 0–1 | Eibar | Santa Cruz de Tenerife |

| 11 March 2023 31 | Eibar | 1–0 | Tenerife | Eibar |
| | | | | Stadium: Ipurua Municipal Stadium |

| 20 March 2023 32 | Mirandés | 2–3 | Eibar | Miranda de Ebro |

| 26 March 2023 33 | Eibar | 0–0 | Andorra | Eibar |
| | | | | Stadium: Ipurua Municipal Stadium |

| 1 April 2023 34 | Oviedo | 1–1 | Eibar | Oviedo |

| 9 April 2023 35 | Eibar | 1–1 | Levante | Eibar |
| | | | | Stadium: Ipurua Municipal Stadium |

| 14 April 2023 36 | Albacete | 3–1 | Eibar | Albacete |

| 21 April 2023 37 | Eibar | 1–1 | Zaragoza | Eibar |
| | | | | Stadium: Ipurua Municipal Stadium |

| 30 April 2023 38 | Granada | 1–1 | Eibar | Granada |

| 8 May 2023 39 | Eibar | 0–1 | Las Palmas | Eibar |
| | | | | Stadium: Ipurua Municipal Stadium |

| 14 May 2023 40 | Racing Santander | 1–0 | Eibar | Santander |

| 20 May 2023 41 | Eibar | 2–2 | Sporting Gijón | Eibar |
| | | | | Stadium: Ipurua Municipal Stadium |

| 27 May 2023 42 | Huesca | 0–1 | Eibar | Huesca |

=== Copa del Rey ===
| 13 November 2022 First round | Las Rozas | 0–3 | Eibar | Las Rozas |
| 12:00 CET | | Report | Blanco Leschuk 74', 78'; Muñoz 89' | Stadium: Navalcarbón; Referee: Daniel Jesús Trujillo Suárez |

| 21 December 2022 Second round | Ibiza Islas Pitiusas | 1–0 | Eibar | Ibiza |
| 19:15 | Antonio 69' | Report | | Stadium: Can Misses III; Referee: Andrés Fuentes Molina |
