= Aitor Galarza =

Spanish footballer

Personal information
- Full name: Aitor Galarza Altuna
- Date of birth: 13 October 2002 (age 24)
- Place of birth: Amezketa, Spain
- Height: 1.82 m (6 ft 0 in)
- Position: Forward

Youth career
- Tolosa

Senior career*
Years	Team	Apps	(Gls)
2021–2022	Tolosa	31	(5)
2022–2023	Eibar Urko	24	(8)
2023–2024	Vitoria	30	(15)
2024–2025	Eibar B	25	(12)
2025–2026	Eibar	5	(0)
2025–2026	→ Barakaldo (loan)	37	(5)
- * Club domestic league appearances and goals as of 9 June 2026

Aitor Galarza Altuna (born 13 October 2002) is a Spanish professional footballer who plays as a forward.

== Career ==
Galarza was born in Amezketa, Gipuzkoa, Basque Country, and was a youth graduate of hometown side Tolosa CF. He made his first team debut on 20 February 2021, coming on as a second-half substitute in a 1–1 Tercera División away draw against Urduliz FT.

In July 2022, after becoming a starter for Tolosa, Galarza moved to SD Eibar and was assigned to second reserve team SD Eibar Urko in the División de Honor de Gipuzkoa. Roughly one year later, he was promoted to farm team CD Vitoria in Tercera Federación.

Galarza scored 15 goals for Vitoria during the campaign, as the side achieved promotion to Segunda Federación. Ahead of the 2024–25 season, he was assigned to SD Eibar B after the affiliation with Vitoria ended, and continued to score in a regular basis.

Galarza made his first team debut with the Armeros on 18 January 2025, coming on as a late substitute for Jorge Pascual in a 1–1 Segunda División home draw against Albacete Balompié. Three days later, he renewed his contract until 2026.

On 14 July 2025, Galarza was loaned to Primera Federación side Barakaldo CF, for one year.
