= Markel Arana =

Spanish footballer

Personal information
- Full name: Markel Arana Mateo
- Date of birth: 24 November 2001 (age 24)
- Place of birth: Loiu, Spain
- Height: 1.86 m (6 ft 1 in)
- Position: Centre-back

Team information
- Current team: Eibar
- Number: 18

Youth career
- Danok Bat

Senior career*
Years	Team	Apps	(Gls)
2020–2022	Eibar Urko	37	(6)
2022–2024	Vitoria	51	(8)
2022–	Eibar	1	(0)
2024–2025	Eibar B	32	(4)
2025–2026	→ Barakaldo (loan)	36	(3)
- * Club domestic league appearances and goals as of 16 August 2026

Markel Arana Mateo (born 24 November 2001) is a Spanish professional footballer who plays for SD Eibar. Mainly a centre-back, he can also play as a right-back.

== Career ==
Born in Loiu, Biscay, Basque Country, Arana joined SD Eibar's structure in 2020, from Danok Bat CF. He quickly established himself as a regular starter for SD Eibar Urko in the regional leagues, and was promoted to the farm team CD Vitoria in July 2022.

Arana made his first team debut with the Armeros on 13 November 2022, starting in a 3–0 away win over Las Rozas CF, for the season's Copa del Rey. In 2024, he was assigned to Eibar's B-team in Segunda Federación, after the partnership with Vitoria ended.

On 26 December 2024, after being an undisputed starter for the B's, Arana renewed his contract until 2026. The following 14 August, he was loaned to Primera Federación side Barakaldo CF, for one year.

Back to Eibar in July 2026, Arana was included in the first team squad in Segunda División. He made his professional debut on 16 August, starting in a 3–1 Segunda División home loss to CD Tenerife.
