= Cristian Gutiérrez =

Cristian Gutiérrez may refer to:

- Cristian Gutiérrez (footballer, born 1994), Nicaraguan footballer
- Cristian Gutiérrez (footballer, born 2000), Spanish footballer
- Cristián Gutiérrez (soccer, born 1997), Chilean-Canadian soccer player
