= Iker Aldai =

Spanish footballer

Personal information
- Full name: Iker Aldai Igartua
- Date of birth: 24 June 2003 (age 23)
- Place of birth: Getxo, Spain
- Height: 1.82 m (6 ft 0 in)
- Positions: Centre-back; right-back

Team information
- Current team: Avilés Industrial

Youth career
- Romo
- Gatika
- Eibar

Senior career*
| Years | Team | Apps | (Gls) |
| 2021–2024 | Vitoria | 81 | (7) |
| 2023–2026 | Eibar | 4 | (0) |
| 2024–2025 | Eibar B | 23 | (1) |
| 2025–2026 | → Bilbao Athletic (loan) | 28 | (0) |
| 2026– | Avilés Industrial | 0 | (0) |
- * Club domestic league appearances and goals as of 9 June 2026

Iker Aldai Igartua (born 24 June 2003) is a Spanish professional footballer who plays as a centre-back or a right-back for Real Avilés Industrial CF.

== Club career ==
Born in Getxo, Biscay, Basque Country, Aldai joined SD Eibar's youth setup from Gatika KT. He made his senior debut with the farm team on 5 September 2021, starting in a 0–0 Tercera División RFEF away draw against Amurrio Club.

Aldai scored his first senior goals on 16 March 2022, netting a brace for Vitoria in a 3–0 home win over Beti Gazte KJKE. He was called up to the first team for the 2022 pre-season by manager Gaizka Garitano, and made his professional debut on 12 February 2023, coming on as a late substitute for Matheus Pereira in a 3–0 Segunda División home loss against FC Cartagena. In 2024, he was assigned to Eibar's B-team in Segunda Federación, after the partnership with Vitoria ended.

On 16 August 2025, Aldai was loaned to Primera Federación side Bilbao Athletic, for one year. The following 29 June, he agreed to a one-year deal with Real Avilés Industrial CF also in the third tier.
