= Iñigo Martin =

Spanish footballer (born 1999)

Personal information
- Full name: Iñigo Martin Quintano
- Date of birth: 24 May 1999 (age 27)
- Place of birth: Bilbao, Spain
- Height: 1.80 m (5 ft 11 in)
- Position: Forward

Team information
- Current team: Chennaiyin
- Number: 10

Youth career
- Deusto
- 2017–2018: Arenas

Senior career*
| Years | Team | Apps | (Gls) |
| 2017 | Deusto | 1 | (0) |
| 2018–2019 | Deusto | 17 | (3) |
| 2019–2020 | Eibar Urko | 20 | (19) |
| 2020–2023 | Vitoria | 55 | (25) |
| 2020–2021 | → Deusto (loan) | 4 | (1) |
| 2023–2024 | Portugalete | 26 | (9) |
| 2024 | Samtredia | 14 | (3) |
| 2025 | Santa Coloma | 9 | (2) |
| 2025 | Telavi | 16 | (5) |
| 2026– | Chennaiyin | 4 | (0) |
- * Club domestic league appearances and goals as of 7 March 2026

Iñigo Martin Quintano (born 24 May 1999) is a Spanish professional footballer who plays as a forward for Chennaiyin.

== Career ==
Martin was born in Bilbao, and joined the youth academy of Spanish side Arenas Club de Getxo in 2017, after already making his senior debut with SD Deusto. In the following seasons, he represented the latter club and SD Eibar's second reserve team Urko and farm team CD Vitoria.

During the summer of 2024, Martin signed for Georgian side Samtredia from Club Portugalete, where he made fourteen league appearances and scored three goals. Six months later, he signed for Andorran side Santa Coloma, where he made nine league appearances and scored two goals. Following his stint there, he signed for Georgian side Telavi in 2025, where he made sixteen league appearances and scored five goals. Ahead of the 2025–26 season, he signed for Indian side Chennaiyin.

== Style of play ==
Martin plays as a forward. The former president of Spanish side Deusto, Aner Sánchez, said in 2021 that "he had a real nose for goal, he's clinical inside the box, he has that extra burst of speed, and he's very skillful in the final third".
