= Óscar Carrasco (Spanish footballer) =

Spanish footballer

Personal information
- Full name: Óscar Carrasco Sojo
- Date of birth: 28 August 2002 (age 24)
- Place of birth: Terrassa, Spain
- Height: 1.87 m (6 ft 2 in)
- Position: Midfielder

Team information
- Current team: Sant Andreu

Youth career
- Jàbac Terrassa

Senior career*
Years	Team	Apps	(Gls)
2021–2022	San Cristóbal	23	(1)
2022–2024	Vitoria	48	(3)
2024–2025	Eibar B	20	(1)
2024–2026	Eibar	3	(0)
2025–2026	→ Tarazona (loan)	37	(1)
2026–	Sant Andreu	0	(0)
- * Club domestic league appearances and goals as of 10 June 2026

Óscar Carrasco Sojo (born 28 August 2002) is a Spanish professional footballer who plays for UE Sant Andreu. Mainly a midfielder, he can also play as a centre-back.

== Career ==
Born in Terrassa, Barcelona, Catalonia, Carrasco was an UFB Jàbac Terrassa youth graduate. On 12 July 2021, after finishing his formation, he signed for Tercera División RFEF side CP San Cristóbal.

On 12 July 2022, Carrasco left San Cristóbal to join SD Eibar, where he was initially assigned to farm team CD Vitoria also in division five. In 2024, he was assigned to the B-team in Segunda Federación, after the partnership with Vitoria ended, and renewed his contract with the club until 2027 on 19 September of that year.

Carrasco made his first team debut on 30 October 2024, starting in a 1–0 away loss to UD Logroñés, for the season's Copa del Rey. He made his professional debut the following 28 February, coming on as a late substitute for Ander Madariaga in a 2–0 Segunda División away win over FC Cartagena.

On 3 July 2025, Carrasco moved to Primera Federación side SD Tarazona on loan for one year. On 8 August of the following year, he signed a permanent one-year deal with fellow third division side UE Sant Andreu.
