= Susaeta =

Susaeta is a Spanish surname. Notable people with the name include:

- Ander Madariaga Susaeta (born 2002), Spanish footballer
- Markel Susaeta (born 1987), Spanish footballer, cousin of Néstor
- Néstor Susaeta (born 1984), Spanish footballer
