= Fagoaga =

Fagoaga is a surname. Notable people with the surname include:

- Iban Fagoaga, Spanish footballer and manager
- Manuel José de Arce y Fagoaga, Salvadoran statesman and military officer
- Mariano Fagoaga, Salvadoran politician
- Pedro José Arce y Fagoaga, Salvadoran politician
- Ramón Fagoaga, Salvadoran footballer
