= Daniel Fuzato =

Brazilian footballer (born 1997)

Personal information
- Full name: Daniel Cerântula Fuzato
- Date of birth: 4 July 1997 (age 29)
- Place of birth: Santa Bárbara d'Oeste, Brazil
- Height: 1.90 m (6 ft 3 in)
- Position: Goalkeeper

Team information
- Current team: Vasco da Gama
- Number: 13

Youth career
- 2010–2017: Palmeiras

Senior career*
Years	Team	Apps	(Gls)
2017–2018	Palmeiras	0	(0)
2018–2022	Roma	6	(0)
2020–2021	→ Gil Vicente (loan)	0	(0)
2022–2024	Ibiza	37	(0)
2023–2024	→ Getafe (loan)	1	(0)
2024–2025	Eibar	10	(0)
2025–	Vasco da Gama	5	(0)

International career^{‡}
2016	Brazil U20	1	(0)
2020	Brazil U23	1	(0)
- * Club domestic league appearances and goals as of 13 December 2025 ‡ National team caps and goals as of 2 July 2021

Daniel Cerântula Fuzato (born 4 July 1997), is a Brazilian professional footballer who plays as a goalkeeper for Vasco da Gama.

== Club career ==
=== Roma ===
Having been with Palmeiras since 2010 as a youth player, Fuzato signed with Roma on 7 July 2018. He made his professional debut on 1 August 2020 in a 3–1 Serie A win over Juventus.

==== Loan to Gil Vicente ====
On 19 August 2020, Fuzato joined Gil Vicente on loan.

=== Ibiza ===
On 21 June 2022, Fuzato signed a three-year contract with Ibiza in the Spanish Segunda División. He became a regular starter during the campaign, and appeared in 37 league matches, but the club suffered relegation.

==== Loan to Getafe ====
On 5 July 2023, Fuzato was loaned to La Liga side Getafe for one year, with a buyout clause. As a backup to David Soria, he featured only in Copa del Rey matches before making his top tier debut on 26 May 2024, where he replaced Soria late into a 2–1 home loss to Mallorca.

=== Eibar ===
On 10 July 2024, Fuzato signed a two-year contract with Eibar in the second division. He shared the starting spot with fellow new signing Jonmi Magunagoitia.

=== Vasco da Gama ===
On 7 January 2025, Eibar announced an agreement with Vasco da Gama for the transfer of Fuzato.

== International career ==
Fuzato was born in Brazil and is of Italian descent, holding dual citizenship . He is a youth international for Brazil, having represented the Brazil U20s once in 2016. Additionally, He has been called up to represent Brazil U23s and the senior Brazil squad in 2019.

== Career statistics ==
=== Club ===
As of match played 6 May 2026

Appearances and goals by club, season and competition
Club	Season	League			State league		National cup (Note: Includes Coppa Italia, Copa del Rey)		Continental		Other		Total	
Club	Season	Division	Apps	Goals	Apps	Goals	Apps	Goals	Apps	Goals	Apps	Goals	Apps	Goals
Palmeiras	2016	Série A	0	0	—		0	0	0	0	—		0	0
Palmeiras	2017	Série A	0	0	0	0	0	0	0	0	—		0	0
Palmeiras	Total		0	0	0	0	0	0	0	0	—		0	0
Roma	2018–19	Serie A	0	0	—		0	0	0	0	—		0	0
Roma	2019–20	Serie A	1	0	—		0	0	0	0	—		1	0
Roma	2020–21	Serie A	5	0	—		1	0	0	0	—		6	0
Roma	2021–22	Serie A	0	0	—		0	0	1 (Note: Appearance in UEFA Europa Conference League)	0	—		1	0
Roma	Total		6	0	—		1	0	1	0	—		8	0
Gil Vicente (loan)	2021–22	Primeira Liga	0	0	—		0	0	—		—		0	0
Ibiza	2022–23	Segunda División	37	0	—		0	0	—		—		37	0
Getafe (loan)	2023–24	La Liga	0	0	—		2	0	—		—		2	0
Eibar	2024–25	Segunda División	10	0	—		0	0	—		—		10	0
Vasco da Gama	2025	Série A	3	0	2	0	0	0	0	0	—		5	0
Vasco da Gama	2026	Série A	0	0	1	0	0	0	2 (Note: Appearance in Copa Sudamericana)	0	—		3	0
Vasco da Gama	Total		3	0	3	0	0	0	2	0	—		8	0
Career total			56	0	23	0	3	0	3	0	0	0	65	0

== Honours ==
Roma

- UEFA Europa Conference League: 2021–22
