= Iban Fagoaga =

Spanish footballer and manager

Personal information
- Full name: Iban Fagoaga Aguirre
- Date of birth: 26 March 1980 (age 46)
- Place of birth: Bera, Spain
- Height: 1.74 m (5 ft 9 in)
- Position: Centre back

Team information
- Current team: Rayo Vallecano (assistant)

Youth career
- 1995–1999: Antiguoko

Senior career*
Years	Team	Apps	(Gls)
1999–2002	Eibar B	49	(1)
2001–2007	Eibar	159	(5)
2007–2008	Granada 74	28	(1)
2008–2010	Alavés	1	(0)
Total		237	(7)

Managerial career
- 2011–2019: Eibar (youth)
- 2019–2021: Vitoria
- 2021–2022: Arenas Getxo
- 2022–2023: Portugalate
- 2023: Lagun Onak
- 2024: Atlas (assistant)
- 2025–2026: Eibar (assistant)
- 2026–: Rayo Vallecano (assistant)
- * Club domestic league appearances and goals

Iban Fagoaga Aguirre (born 26 March 1980) is a Spanish retired footballer, and the current assistant manager of Rayo Vallecano.

Mainly a central defender, Fagoaga also played as a full-back on either flank, and had his playing career mainly associated with Eibar. After retiring in 2009, he worked as manager of the youth and reserve sides of Eibar before going on to manage other clubs.

== Playing career ==
Born in Bera, Navarre, Fagoaga joined SD Eibar in 1999, after spending four seasons at Antiguoko; he was initially assigned to the reserves in Tercera División. After helping in the B's promotion to Segunda División B in 2000, he made his first team debut on 18 November 2001, starting in a 1–1 Segunda División home draw against Recreativo de Huelva.

After becoming a permanent first team member ahead of the 2002–03 season, Fagoaga scored his first professional goal on 21 December 2004, netting the opener in a 2–1 home loss also against Recre. On 11 July 2007, after one relegation and a consecutive promotion with the Armeros, he moved to fellow second division side Granada 74 CF on a three-year contract.

On 4 August 2008, after the Andalusians' relegation, Fagoaga agreed to a two-year deal with Deportivo Alavés, also in division two. He struggled severely with injuries during his period at the club, only featuring in one match for the Babazorros (42 minutes of action, being sent off); in April 2009, the club tried to unregister him, being later denied by the LFP, and in May, the club offered him a contract rescision, which he refused.

After spending the entire 2009–10 season recovering, but still under contract, Fagoaga left Alavés and subsequently retired.

== Managerial career ==
On 3 June 2011, Fagoaga returned to his main club Eibar, after being named manager of the Cadete squad. On 21 September 2014, he took over the Juvenil squad, before being named at the helm of the farm team CD Vitoria on 9 January 2019, replacing sacked Igor Gordobil.

Fagoaga left the Armeros on 1 June 2021 to take over at Segunda División RFEF side Arenas Club de Getxo. He was dismissed from the latter on 19 April 2022; despite being unbeaten for ten matches, he only won nine out of his last 21 points in charge.

On 6 December 2022, after nearly eight months without a club, Fagoaga was named at the helm of Tercera Federación side Club Portugalete, following the resignation of Patxi Salinas. He left the club by mutual consent the following 27 April, after a run of four defeats in the last five league games of the campaign, which saw the side miss out on the play-offs by six points.

On 18 May 2023, Fagoaga was named manager of CD Lagun Onak, also in the fifth tier. On 1 December 2023, however, he left the club to join Beñat San José's staff as an assistant manager at Liga MX Atlas FC.

== Managerial statistics ==
As of 25 November 2023

Managerial record by team and tenure
Team	Nat	From	To	Record								Ref
Team	Nat	From	To	G	W	D	L	GF	GA	GD	Win %	Ref
Vitoria	(Spain)	9 January 2019	1 June 2021	75	29	27	19	78	52	+26	38.67	
Arenas Club	(Spain)	1 June 2021	19 April 2022	31	10	14	7	36	26	+10	32.26	
Portugalate	(Spain)	6 December 2022	27 April 2023	18	6	6	6	16	15	+1	33.33	
Lagun Onak	(Spain)	18 May 2023	1 December 2023	12	7	4	1	16	7	+9	58.33	
Total				136	52	51	33	146	100	+46	38.24	—
