= Unbe Sports Complex =

Sports complex in Eibar, Spain

Coordinates: 43°10′30″N 02°28′07″W

- Interactive map of Unbe Sports Complex
- Location: Eibar; Basque Country
- Owner: Eibar City Council

Construction
- Built: 11 August 1997

Tenants
- SD Eibar (training) (1997–2014); Eibar RT (1997–); SD Eibar (women); Eibar Urko (2016–); CD Vitoria (2019–)

Website
- www.eibarkirola.com

The Unbe Sports Complex (Basque: Unbe Kirol Konplexua, Spanish: Complejo Deportivo de Unbe) is a sports complex in Eibar, Gipuzkoa, Basque Country, Spain. It is the home venue of the Primera Federación women's football team SD Eibar and used to be the training ground of the La Liga club SD Eibar until 2014. It was opened in 1997.

Occupying an area of 55,000 m^{2}, the grounds are located at the southern outskirts of town of Eibar.

== Facilities ==
- The Central Stadium of the sports complex with a capacity of 1,000 seats. It is the home stadium of the Primera División women's football team SD Eibar, the Tercera División team CD Vitoria – the farm team of SD Eibar –, and the División de Honor B rugby union team Eibar RT. It was the home stadium of SD Eibar B, the reserve team of SD Eibar, until that team was dissolved.
- An eight-lane athletics track.
- 2 artificial pitches.
- 2 paddle tennis courts and a tennis court.
- Service centre with gymnasium.
