= Elyaz Zidane =

French footballer (born 2005)

Personal information
- Full name: Elyaz Zidane Fernández
- Date of birth: 26 December 2005 (age 20)
- Place of birth: Marseille, France
- Height: 1.96 m (6 ft 5 in)
- Position: Centre-back

Team information
- Current team: Red Star
- Number: 4

Youth career
- 2011–2013: Canillas
- 2013–2024: Real Madrid
- 2024–2026: Betis

Senior career*
Years	Team	Apps	(Gls)
2024–2026	Betis B	34	(0)
2026–	Red Star	4	(0)

International career^{‡}
2021–2022	France U17	12	(2)
2022–2023	France U18	5	(0)
2023–2024	France U19	12	(0)
2024–	France U20	17	(1)
Medal record
Men's football
Representing France
UEFA European Under-19 Championship
Runner-up	2024 Northern Ireland
UEFA European Under-17 Championship
Winner	2022 Israel
- * Club domestic league appearances and goals as of 09:18, 30 August 2026 (UTC) ‡ National team caps and goals as of 18 October 2025

Elyaz Zidane Fernández (born 26 December 2005) is a French professional footballer who plays as a centre-back for Ligue 2 club Red Star.

== Early life ==
Elyaz Zidane was born on 26 December 2005 in Marseille. He is the youngest son of former French footballer Zinedine Zidane. Elyaz is the last of four brothers, and all of them – Enzo, Luca, and Théo – are footballers who developed at the youth academy of Real Madrid. Elyaz is of Spanish descent through his mother, and of Algerian descent through his father.

== Club career ==
Elyaz started his career at CD Canillas, before joining La Fábrica in 2013.

He went through all the levels of the youth academy, already showing his skills with several goals in the Juvenil classicos. He started playing with the under-19 during the 2021–22 season.

In January 2024, Zidane left Real Madrid to join Real Betis, signing a contract until June 2026.

On 4 July 2026, he was transferred to French second-tier side Red Star.

== International career ==
He is eligible for the Algerian and French selections through his father, and for the Spanish selection through his mother, Elyaz is a youth international for France, having made his debut with the France under-17 team, in October 2021. Having already scored two goals with Les Bleuets, including one on his debut, he even captained his side for a friendly against Spain in 2022.

In April 2022, he was selected with France for the 2022 UEFA European Under-17 Championship. In September 2025, he was named in the France U20 squad for the 2025 FIFA U-20 World Cup.

== Style of play ==
A left-footed defender, Elyaz is described as a physical player with a good reading of the game. He is able to play both as a left-back or a central defender.

== Career statistics ==
As of match played 29 August 2026

Appearances and goals by club, season and competition
Club	Season	League			National cup (Note: Includes Copa del Rey, Coupe de France)		Other		Total	
Club	Season	Division	Apps	Goals	Apps	Goals	Apps	Goals	Apps	Goals
Betis B	2023–24	Segunda Federación	5	0	—		3 (Note: Appearances in Segunda Federación play-offs)	0	8	0
Betis B	2024–25	Primera Federación	12	0	—		—		12	0
Betis B	2025–26	Primera Federación	17	0	—		—		17	0
Betis B	Total		34	0	0	0	3	0	37	0
Red Star	2026–27	Ligue 2	4	0	0	0	0	0	4	0
Career total			38	0	0	0	3	0	41	0

== Honours ==
France U17

- UEFA European Under-17 Championship: 2022

France U19

- UEFA European Under-19 Championship runner-up: 2024

France U20

- Maurice Revello Tournament: 2025
