= Oier Llorente =

Spanish footballer

Personal information
- Full name: Oier LLorente Korta
- Date of birth: 24 March 2005 (age 21)
- Place of birth: Sopela, Spain
- Height: 1.83 m (6 ft 0 in)
- Position: Centre-back

Team information
- Current team: Eibar B
- Number: 4

Youth career
- Getxo
- 2022–2024: Eibar

Senior career*
Years	Team	Apps	(Gls)
2024	Eibar Urko	3	(0)
2024–	Eibar B	45	(1)
2024–	Eibar	1	(0)
- * Club domestic league appearances and goals as of 24 April 2026

Oier Llorente Korta (born 24 March 2005) is a Spanish professional footballer who plays as a centre-back for SD Eibar B.

== Career ==
Born in Sopela, Biscay, Basque Country, Llorente joined SD Eibar's youth sides in 2022, from CD Getxo. He made his senior debut with reserve team SD Eibar Urko in 2024, and was promoted to the reserves shortly after.

Llorente made his first team debut on 30 October 2024, coming on as a late substitute for Raúl Giménez in a 1–0 away loss to UD Logroñés, for the season's Copa del Rey. He subsequently returned to the B-side, scoring his first goal on 4 April 2026, netting the team's third in a 3–2 home win over the same opponent.

Llorente made his professional debut with the Armeros on 24 April 2026, replacing Anaitz Arbilla late into a 3–0 Segunda División away win over Albacete Balompié.

== Personal life ==
Llorente is the grandson of former rower José Luis Korta.
