= Hodei Arrillaga =

Spanish footballer

Personal information
- Full name: Hodei Arrillaga Elezgarai
- Date of birth: 21 May 2004 (age 22)
- Place of birth: Mutriku, Spain
- Height: 1.75 m (5 ft 9 in)
- Position: Left-back

Team information
- Current team: Mirandés (on loan from Eibar)

Youth career
- Mutriku
- 2016–2022: Eibar

Senior career*
Years	Team	Apps	(Gls)
2022–2024	Vitoria	48	(2)
2024–	Eibar	39	(0)
2026–	→ Mirandés (loan)	0	(0)
- * Club domestic league appearances and goals as of 6 June 2026

Hodei Arrillaga Elezgarai (born 21 May 2004) is a Spanish professional footballer who plays as a left-back for CD Mirandés, on loan from SD Eibar.

== Career ==
Born in Mutriku, Gipuzkoa, Basque Country, Arrillaga joined SD Eibar's youth sides in 2016, from hometown side Mutriku FT. In July 2022, he was promoted to farm team CD Vitoria in Tercera Federación, and made his senior debut on 10 September of that year by starting in a 3–1 home win over SCD Durango.

Arrillaga scored his first senior goal on 4 December 2022, netting Vitoria's opener through a penalty kick in a 2–0 home win over Club Portugalete. He renewed his contract until 2027 on 6 March 2024, and was a regular starter as Vitoria achieved promotion to Segunda Federación.

Ahead of the 2024–25 campaign Arrillaga was assigned to Eibar's B-team after they took Vitoria's place in the fourth division, but spent the entire pre-season with the main squad. He made his professional debut with the Armeros on 17 August 2024, starting in a 1–0 Segunda División home win over CD Castellón.

On 30 August 2024, Arrillaga was definitely promoted to the main squad of the Armeros, being assigned the number 14 jersey. On 8 July 2026, he renewed his contract until 2029, but was loaned to Primera Federación side CD Mirandés eight days later.
