= Sergio Cubero =

Spanish footballer

Personal information
- Full name: Sergio Cubero Ezcurra
- Date of birth: 5 September 1999 (age 27)
- Place of birth: Mungia, Spain
- Height: 1.87 m (6 ft 2 in)
- Position: Defender

Team information
- Current team: Eibar
- Number: 2

Youth career
- 2008–2015: Romo
- 2015–2018: Athletic Bilbao

Senior career*
Years	Team	Apps	(Gls)
2018–2019	Eibar Urko	29	(6)
2019–2021	Vitoria	39	(1)
2019–	Eibar	63	(2)
2021–2022	→ Logroñés (loan)	31	(1)
2022–2023	→ Fuenlabrada (loan)	37	(1)
2023–2024	→ Racing Ferrol (loan)	33	(0)
- * Club domestic league appearances and goals as of 6 June 2026

Sergio Cubero Ezcurra (born 5 September 1999) is a Spanish professional footballer who plays as either a central defender or a right back for SD Eibar.

== Club career ==
Born in Mungia, Biscay, Basque Country, Cubero joined Athletic Bilbao's Lezama in 2015, from Romo FC. Released by the club in 2018, he moved to SD Eibar and joined their second reserve team in the regional leagues.

Cubero was promoted to the farm team for the 2019–20 campaign, Cubero renewed his contract until 2023 on 11 November 2019. He made his first team debut on 17 December, starting in a 5–0 away routing of SD Logroñés, for the season's Copa del Rey.

Cubero made his La Liga debut on 29 December 2020, coming on as a late substitute for Pape Diop in a 1–1 draw against FC Barcelona at the Camp Nou. The following 31 August, he was loaned to Primera División RFEF side SD Logroñés for the season.

On 17 August 2022, Cubero renewed his contract with the Armeros until 2025, and moved to fellow third division side CF Fuenlabrada also on a one-year loan deal.

On 7 August 2023, Cubero moved to Racing de Ferrol, newly-promoted to Segunda División, on a one-year loan deal.
