= Jorge Yriarte =

Venezuelan footballer (born 2000)

Personal information
- Full name: Jorge Luis Yriarte González
- Date of birth: 4 March 2000 (age 26)
- Place of birth: Barquisimeto, Venezuela
- Height: 1.82 m (5 ft 11 1/2 in)
- Position: Midfielder

Team information
- Current team: Śląsk Wrocław
- Number: 15

Youth career
- Deportivo Lara

Senior career*
Years	Team	Apps	(Gls)
2016–2020	Deportivo Lara	19	(0)
2019–2020	→ Vitoria (loan)	16	(0)
2020–2022	Vitoria	51	(2)
2022–2025	Eibar	5	(0)
2022–2023	→ Amorebieta (loan)	33	(1)
2024	→ Amorebieta (loan)	15	(0)
2024–2025	→ Murcia (loan)	23	(1)
2025–	Śląsk Wrocław	36	(0)

International career^{‡}
2017	Venezuela U17	3	(0)
2019	Venezuela U20	4	(1)
2018	Venezuela U21	1	(0)
2025–	Venezuela	4	(1)
- * Club domestic league appearances and goals as of 18:08, 19 September 2026 (UTC) ‡ National team caps and goals as of 06:57, 10 June 2026 (UTC)

Jorge Luis Yriarte González (born 4 March 2000) is a Venezuelan professional footballer who plays as a midfielder for Polish club Śląsk Wrocław and the Venezuela national team.

== Club career ==
Yriarte was born in Barquisimeto, and is a youth product of Deportivo Lara. He made his Primera División debut on 21 May 2017, starting in a 1–1 away draw against Aragua.

On 21 June 2019, Yriarte moved abroad and joined Spanish club SD Eibar on loan, being assigned to the farm team in Tercera División. On 28 August 2020, he signed a permanent contract with the club.

On 9 August 2022, Yriarte was loaned to SD Amorebieta for one year, and was a regular starter during the season, scoring once as the club returned to Segunda División. Upon returning to the Armeros, he renewed his contract until 2026 on 24 July 2023.

On 1 February 2024, after being rarely used by Eibar, Yriarte returned to Amore on loan for the remainder of the season. On 26 July, he moved to Primera Federación side Real Murcia CF on a one-year loan deal.

On 12 July 2025, Yriarte signed a two-year contract with Polish side Śląsk Wrocław.

== Career statistics ==
=== Club ===
As of match played 19 September 2026

Appearances and goals by club, season and competition
Club	Season	League			National cup (Note: Includes Copa Venezuela, Copa del Rey, Polish Cup)		Continental		Other		Total	
Club	Season	Division	Apps	Goals	Apps	Goals	Apps	Goals	Apps	Goals	Apps	Goals
Deportivo Lara	2016	Venezuelan Primera División	0	0	6	1	—		0	0	6	1
Deportivo Lara	2017	Venezuelan Primera División	5	0	0	0	—		0	0	5	0
Deportivo Lara	2018	Venezuelan Primera División	7	0	0	0	—		—		7	0
Deportivo Lara	2019	Venezuelan Primera División	7	0	0	0	8 (Note: Six appearances in Copa Libertadores, two appearances in Copa Sudamericana)	0	—		15	0
Deportivo Lara	Total		19	0	6	1	8	0	0	0	33	1
Vitoria (loan)	2019–20	Tercera División	17	0	—		—		—		17	0
Vitoria	2020–21	Tercera División	26	2	—		—		—		26	2
Vitoria	2021–22	Tercera Federación	25	0	—		—		1	0	26	0
Vitoria	Total		51	2	—		—		1	0	52	2
Eibar B	2019–20	Segunda División B	—		—		—		1 (Note: Appearance in Segunda División B play-offs)	0	1	0
Eibar B	2020–21	Segunda División B	—		—		—		1	0	1	0
Eibar B	Total		—		—		—		2	0	2	0
Eibar	2021–22	Segunda División	0	0	0	0	—		0	0	0	0
Eibar	2023–24	Segunda División	5	0	3	0	—		—		8	0
Eibar	Total		5	0	3	0	—		—		8	0
Amorebieta (loan)	2022–23	Primera Federación	33	1	1	0	—		1 (Note: Appearance in Primera Federación play-offs)	0	35	1
Amorebieta (loan)	2023–24	Segunda División	15	0	—		—		—		15	0
Real Murcia (loan)	2024–25	Primera Federación	23	1	0	0	—		3 (Note: Two appearances in Primera Federación play-offs, one appearance in Copa Federación)	0	26	1
Śląsk Wrocław	2025–26	I liga	28	0	3	0	—		—		31	0
Śląsk Wrocław	2026–27	Ekstraklasa	8	0	1	0	—		—		9	0
Śląsk Wrocław	Total		36	0	4	0	—		—		40	0
Career total			199	4	14	1	8	0	7	0	228	5

=== International ===
As of match played 9 June 2026

Appearances and goals by national team and year
National team	Year	Apps	Goals
Venezuela	2025	2	1
Venezuela	2026	2	0
Total		4	1

Scores and results list Venezuela's goal tally first, score column indicates score after each Yriarte goal.

List of international goals scored by Jorge Yriarte
No.	Date	Venue	Opponent	Score	Result	Competition
1	18 January 2025	Chase Stadium, Fort Lauderdale, United States	United States	1–3	1–3	Friendly

== Honours ==
Amorebieta

- Primera Federación: 2022–23 (Group 2 & overall)
