= Ángel Troncho =

Spanish footballer

Personal information
- Full name: Ángel Troncho Beltrán
- Date of birth: 2 October 2002 (age 24)
- Place of birth: Benicarló, Spain
- Height: 1.80 m (5 ft 11 in)
- Position: Winger

Team information
- Current team: Barakaldo
- Number: 19

Youth career
- Benicarló FB
- 2019–2020: Eibar

Senior career*
| Years | Team | Apps | (Gls) |
| 2019 | Benicarló | 4 | (0) |
| 2020–2022 | Vitoria | 29 | (2) |
| 2022–2026 | Eibar | 19 | (0) |
| 2024 | → Amorebieta (loan) | 3 | (0) |
| 2025–2026 | → Arenas Getxo (loan) | 25 | (2) |
| 2026– | Barakaldo | 5 | (0) |
- * Club domestic league appearances and goals as of 27 September 2026

Ángel Troncho Beltrán (born 2 October 2002) is a Spanish professional footballer who plays as a left winger for Primera Federación club Barakaldo.

== Club career ==
Born in Benicarló, Castellón, Valencian Community, Troncho was a CF Benicarló FB youth graduate. He made his senior debut with the first team CD Benicarló on 23 March 2019, playing the last 20 minutes in a 2–1 Regional Preferente away win over CF Huracán Moncada.

In July 2019, after four first team appearances for Benicarló, Troncho moved to SD Eibar and returned to youth football. He started to feature with the reserves in Tercera División during the 2020–21 season, and renewed his contract until 2025 on 2 November 2020.

Troncho spent most of the 2021–22 campaign nursing a knee injury, but was still called up to the first team for the 2022 pre-season by manager Gaizka Garitano. He made his professional debut on 10 October 2022, coming on as a second-half substitute for Yanis Rahmani in a 0–0 home draw against CD Mirandés in the Segunda División.

On 18 January 2024, after being rarely used during the first half of the campaign, Troncho was loaned to fellow league team SD Amorebieta until June. He suffered a knee injury shortly after arriving, and struggled with a setback of his injury in August; in September, Eibar renewed his contract until 2027.

On 14 July 2025, after spending the entire 2024–25 season sidelined, Troncho moved to Primera Federación side Arenas Club de Getxo on loan for one year. On 5 August of the following year, he terminated his link with the Armeros.
