= Imanol Sarriegi =

Spanish footballer (born 1995)

Personal information
- Full name: Imanol Sarriegi Isasa
- Date of birth: 27 April 1995 (age 31)
- Place of birth: San Sebastián, Spain
- Height: 1.80 m (5 ft 11 in)
- Position: Midfielder

Team information
- Current team: Sestao River
- Number: 5

Youth career
- Antiguoko
- Real Sociedad

Senior career*
Years	Team	Apps	(Gls)
2014–2016	Mallorca B	9	(0)
2014–2015	→ Peña Sport (loan)	29	(4)
2016–2018	Vitoria	56	(3)
2017–2018	Eibar	3	(0)
2018–2019	East Riffa	?	(1)
2019–2020	Ejea	6	(0)
2020–2021	Tudelano	21	(1)
2021–2022	Calahorra	16	(1)
2022–2023	SD Logroñés	35	(2)
2023–2025	UD Logroñés	52	(3)
2025–	Sestao River	25	(1)
- * Club domestic league appearances and goals as of 14 May 2026

Imanol Sarriegi Isasa (born 27 April 1995) is a Spanish footballer who plays as a central midfielder for Segunda Federación club Sestao River.

== Club career ==
Born in San Sebastián, Gipuzkoa, Basque Country, Sarriegi represented Antiguoko and Real Sociedad as a youth. He was promoted to the latter's reserves on 23 June 2014, but opted to join RCD Mallorca B shortly after, being immediately loaned to Peña Sport FC.

Sarriegi returned to Mallorca in July 2015, but moved to another reserve team, CD Vitoria, on 30 December. He made his debut for the first team – SD Eibar – on 12 January 2017, starting in a 0–0 home draw against CA Osasuna for the Copa del Rey. His first La Liga appearance took place on 5 November, when he came on as a 59th-minute substitute in the 1–3 away loss to Real Sociedad, being booked late in the match.

On 9 July 2018, Sarriegi moved abroad for the first time in his career, joining Bahraini Premier League side East Riffa Club.

On 30 June 2021, he joined Primera División RFEF club Calahorra. A year later he joined neighbours SD Logroñés, then switched to UD Logroñés in 2023.

== Personal life ==
Sarriegi's younger brother Oier (born 1997) is also a footballer. A forward or right back, he too began at Antiguoko before being signed by Athletic Bilbao in 2015, serving loans and moving on to Deportivo Alavés two years later. Their sister Amaiur Sarriegi (born 2000) plays as a forward for Real Sociedad Femenino having also played for Añorga KKE and Athletic Bilbao.
