= Luca Zidane =

Algerian-French footballer (born 1998)

- Luca with Real Madrid in 2018

Personal information
- Full name: Luca Zinedine Zidane
- Date of birth: 13 May 1998 (age 28)
- Place of birth: Aix-en-Provence, France
- Height: 1.83 m (6 ft 0 in)
- Position: Goalkeeper

Team information
- Current team: Leganés
- Number: 13

Youth career
- 2004–2018: Real Madrid

Senior career*
Years	Team	Apps	(Gls)
2016–2019	Real Madrid B	49	(0)
2017–2020	Real Madrid	2	(0)
2019–2020	→ Racing Santander (loan)	33	(0)
2020–2022	Rayo Vallecano	23	(0)
2022–2024	Eibar	77	(0)
2024–2026	Granada	42	(0)
2026–	Leganés	9	(0)

International career^{‡}
2014	France U16	3	(0)
2014–2015	France U17	14	(0)
2015–2016	France U18	6	(0)
2016	France U19	6	(0)
2018	France U20	1	(0)
2025–	Algeria	10	(0)
Medal record
Men's football
Representing France
UEFA European Under-17 Championship
Winner	2015
- * Club domestic league appearances and goals as of 4 November 2026 ‡ National team caps and goals as of 2 July 2026

Luca Zinedine Zidane Fernández (Arabic: لوكا زين الدين زيدان; born 13 May 1998) is a professional footballer who plays as a goalkeeper for Segunda División club Leganés. Born in France, he plays for the Algeria national team.

Zidane began his career with Real Madrid before competing professionally in Spain, mainly in Segunda División with Racing Santander, Rayo Vallecano, Eibar, and now Granada.

Zidane represented his country of birth, France, at youth international levels. Having qualified through his paternal grandparents, he was selected for the Algeria senior national team in 2025, and played for them at the 2025 Africa Cup of Nations and 2026 FIFA World Cup. He is the son of French professional football manager and former player Zinedine Zidane.

== Early life ==
Luca Zinedine Zidane was born in Aix-en-Provence, France, on 13 May 1998. He is the son of the footballer Zinedine Zidane and professional dancer Veronique Fernández. He is the second of four brothers, all of whom – Enzo, Théo, and Elyaz – are professional footballers who developed at the Real Madrid youth academy. Zidane is of Spanish descent through his mother, and Algerian Berber descent through his father. He has French and Algerian nationality.

== Club career ==
Zidane joined the Real Madrid youth academy at the age of 6 in 2004 and plays as a goalkeeper. He worked his way up from the academy, eventually joining Castilla, the reserve team.

=== Real Madrid ===
Zidane's father, Zinedine Zidane, joined the Real Madrid coaching staff in 2014, thereby becoming Luca's manager at various levels early in his footballing career. Zidane made his professional debut for Real Madrid in their last league game of the 2017–18 season: a 2–2 La Liga tie with Villarreal CF on 19 May 2018.

==== Loan to Santander ====
Zidane was loaned to Racing Santander of Segunda División on 8 July 2019 for the 2019–20 season. He made his debut on 17 August 2019 in a 1–0 home loss to Málaga, in which he suffered an injury to the muscle on the back of his right leg.

=== Rayo Vallecano ===
On 5 October 2020, Zidane joined Rayo Vallecano. He made his debut on 2 December, coming as substitute for Stole Dimitrievski who was sent off in a 1–0 loss to Leganés. When Dimitrievski played in UEFA Euro 2020 for North Macedonia, he played in all the remaining games of the season and led the team to promotion to the top flight after defeating Girona in the play-off final.

=== Eibar ===
On 1 September 2022, free agent Zidane signed a two-year contract with Eibar in the second division. On 22 March of the following year, he renewed his link with the club until 2026.

=== Granada ===
On 5 July 2024, Zidane agreed to a three-year deal with Granada, who were recently relegated to the second division. On 7 August 2026, he terminated his link with the club.

=== Leganés ===
On 7 August 2026, Zidane signed for Leganés on a one-year contract with an option for an additional year.

== International career ==
Born in France to French-born parents of Algerian and Spanish descent, Zidane represented France at youth international level. He was part of the France under-17 squad that won the 2015 UEFA European Under-17 Championship and also featured at the 2015 FIFA U-17 World Cup. He made one appearance for the under-20 team on 23 March 2018 in a 1–0 friendly defeat to the United States in Spain.

On 19 September 2025, FIFA approved Zidane's request to change his sporting nationality from French to Algerian, making him eligible to play for the Algeria national team. On 2 October 2025, he accepted their call-up for the 2026 FIFA World Cup qualification matches against Somalia and Uganda. His debut with Algeria came twelve days later in the 2026 FIFA World Cup qualification match against Uganda after being named in the starting line-up.

Zidane was named to manager Vladimir Petković's Algeria national team for the 2025 Africa Cup of Nations in Morocco. He was named to the squad again for the 2026 FIFA World Cup. He was in goal for Algeria's win over the Netherlands in a friendly on 4 June 2026.

== Career statistics ==
=== Club ===
As of match played 26 April 2026

Appearances and goals by club, season and competition
Club	Season	League			Copa del Rey		Europe		Other		Total	
Club	Season	Division	Apps	Goals	Apps	Goals	Apps	Goals	Apps	Goals	Apps	Goals
Real Madrid Castilla	2016–17	Segunda División B	8	0	—		—		—		8	0
Real Madrid Castilla	2017–18	Segunda División B	13	0	—		—		—		13	0
Real Madrid Castilla	2018–19	Segunda División B	28	0	—		—		2 (Note: Appearances in Segunda División B promotion play-offs)	0	30	0
Real Madrid Castilla	Total		49	0	—		—		2	0	51	0
Real Madrid	2017–18	La Liga	1	0	0	0	0	0	0	0	1	0
Real Madrid	2018–19	La Liga	1	0	0	0	0	0	0	0	1	0
Real Madrid	Total		2	0	0	0	—		—		2	0
Racing Santander (loan)	2019–20	Segunda División	33	0	0	0	—		—		33	0
Rayo Vallecano	2020–21	Segunda División	11	0	0	0	—		4 (Note: Appearances in Segunda División promotion play-offs)	0	15	0
Rayo Vallecano	2021–22	La Liga	8	0	5	0	—		—		13	0
Rayo Vallecano	Total		19	0	5	0	—		4	0	28	0
Eibar	2022–23	Segunda División	33	0	0	0	—		2	0	36	0
Eibar	2023–24	Segunda División	28	0	0	0	—		0	0	31	0
Eibar	Total		61	0	0	0	—		2	0	63	0
Granada	2024–25	Segunda División	16	0	2	0	—		—		18	0
Granada	2025–26	Segunda División	26	0	1	0	—		—		27	0
Granada	Total		42	0	3	0	—		—		45	0
Career total			193	0	6	0	0	0	8	0	207	0

=== International ===
As of match played 2 July 2026

Appearances and goals by national team and year
National team	Year	Apps	Goals
Algeria	2025	3	0
Algeria	2026	7	0
Total		10	0

== Honours ==
Real Madrid

- UEFA Champions League: 2017–18

France U17

- UEFA European Under-17 Championship: 2015

== See also ==
- List of European association football families
