= Cristian Gutiérrez (footballer, born 1994) =

Nicaraguan footballer

Personal information
- Full name: Cristian Mauriel Gutiérrez Peralta
- Date of birth: 6 January 1993 (age 33)
- Place of birth: Jalapa, Nicaragua
- Height: 1.72 m (5 ft 8 in)
- Position: Centre-back

Team information
- Current team: Real Estelí
- Number: 24

Senior career*
Years	Team	Apps	(Gls)
2013–2016	Real Estelí	50	(1)
2016–2017	Bóer FC		
2017–2018	Walter Ferretti	32	(1)
2018–	Real Estelí	65	(3)

International career^{‡}
2012–2013	Nicaragua U20	6	(0)
2015–	Nicaragua	9	(0)
- * Club domestic league appearances and goals as of 8 November 2020 ‡ National team caps and goals as of 10 October 2020

Cristian Mauriel Gutiérrez Peralta (born 6 January 1993) is a Nicaraguan professional footballer who plays as a centre-back for Liga Primera club Real Estelí and the Nicaragua national team.
