= Peru Nolaskoain =

Spanish footballer (born 1998)

Personal information
- Full name: Peru Nolaskoain Esnal
- Date of birth: 25 October 1998 (age 28)
- Place of birth: Zumaia, Spain
- Height: 1.86 m (6 ft 1 in)
- Positions: Centre-back; defensive midfielder

Team information
- Current team: Eibar
- Number: 8

Youth career
- Zumaiako
- 2014–2015: Antiguoko
- 2015–2016: Athletic Bilbao

Senior career*
Years	Team	Apps	(Gls)
2016–2019	Bilbao Athletic	77	(5)
2018–2024	Athletic Bilbao	11	(2)
2019–2020	→ Deportivo La Coruña (loan)	28	(2)
2022	→ Amorebieta (loan)	17	(1)
2022–2023	→ Eibar (loan)	32	(2)
2024–	→ Eibar	80	(6)

International career
2017	Spain U19	1	(0)
2016	Spain U20	6	(2)
- * Club domestic league appearances and goals as of 6 June 2026

Peru Nolaskoain Esnal (born 25 October 1998) is a Spanish professional footballer who plays as either a centre-back or a defensive midfielder for SD Eibar.

== Club career ==
Born in Zumaia, Gipuzkoa, Basque Country, joined Athletic Bilbao's Lezama academy in 2015, from Antiguoko. On 13 June 2016, he was promoted to the farm team, but moved straight to the reserves.

Nolaskoain made his senior debut on 21 August 2016, coming on as a first-half substitute for Tarsi and scoring his team's second in a 3–0 Segunda División B home win against UD Socuéllamos. During the 2018 pre-season, he was converted to a central defender by new first-team manager Eduardo Berizzo.

Nolaskoain made his professional – and La Liga – debut on 20 August 2018, starting and scoring the opener in a 2–1 home win against CD Leganés. The following 9 August, after featuring sparingly with the main squad, he was loaned to Segunda División side Deportivo de La Coruña for one year.

In July 2020, he suffered a serious ankle injury which kept him out for nearly 18 months. On 21 January 2022, he was loaned to second division side SD Amorebieta for the remainder of the campaign.

On 26 August 2022, Nolaskoain moved to SD Eibar in the second division, on loan for one year; he featured regularly as they reached the promotion play-offs, losing out to local rivals Deportivo Alavés. Back to the Lions in July 2023, he only made two late substitute appearances in the league and two starts against lower-division opponents in the Copa del Rey, before returning to Eibar on a permanent three-and-a-half-year contract on 31 January 2024; Athletic retained a buy-back option and a bonus for Eibar gaining promotion to La Liga.

== Career statistics ==
=== Club ===
As of 31 January 2024

Appearances and goals by club, season and competition
Club	Season	League			National cup		Continental		Other		Total	
Club	Season	Division	Apps	Goals	Apps	Goals	Apps	Goals	Apps	Goals	Apps	Goals
Bilbao Athletic	2016–17	Segunda División B	22	1	—		—		—		22	1
Bilbao Athletic	2017–18	Segunda División B	37	4	—		—		2 (Note: Appearance(s) in Promotion Playoffs)	0	39	4
Bilbao Athletic	2018–19	Segunda División B	18	0	—		—		—		18	0
Bilbao Athletic	Total		77	5	0	0	0	0	2	0	79	5
Athletic Bilbao	2017–18	La Liga	0	0	0	0	0	0	—		0	0
Athletic Bilbao	2018–19	La Liga	8	2	2	0	—		—		10	2
Athletic Bilbao	2020–21	La Liga	1	0	2	0	—		—		3	0
Athletic Bilbao	2023–24	La Liga	2	0	3	0	—		—		5	0
Athletic Bilbao	Total		11	2	7	0	0	0	0	0	18	2
Deportivo La Coruña (loan)	2019–20	Segunda División	28	2	1	0	—		—		29	2
Amorebieta (loan)	2021–22	Segunda División	17	1	0	0	—		—		17	1
Eibar (loan)	2022–23	Segunda División	32	2	1	0	—		2	0	35	2
Career total			165	12	9	0	0	0	4	0	178	12
