= Jon Guruzeta =

Spanish footballer (born 2000)

Personal information
- Full name: Jon Guruzeta Rodríguez
- Date of birth: 3 April 2000 (age 26)
- Place of birth: San Sebastián, Spain
- Height: 1.85 m (6 ft 1 in)
- Position: Winger

Team information
- Current team: Eibar
- Number: 10

Youth career
- Real Sociedad
- 2017–2018: Antiguoko
- 2018–2019: Athletic Bilbao

Senior career*
Years	Team	Apps	(Gls)
2019–2021	Basconia	40	(7)
2020–2023	Bilbao Athletic	64	(2)
2023–2024	Sestao River	35	(2)
2024–	Eibar	65	(3)
- * Club domestic league appearances and goals as of 6 June 2026

Jon Guruzeta Rodríguez (born 3 April 2000) is a Spanish professional footballer who plays as a right winger for SD Eibar.

== Career ==
Born in San Sebastián, Gipuzkoa, Basque Country, Guruzeta began his career with Real Sociedad. Released in 2017, he moved to affiliate club Antiguoko KE before accepting an offer from Athletic Bilbao in March 2018 to join their Juvenil squad.

After progressing through the youth setup, Guruzeta was promoted to farm team CD Basconia ahead of the 2019–20 season, and made his senior debut on 24 August 2019, coming on as a late substitute for Beñat Prados in a 3–2 Tercera División home win over Sodupe UC. He scored his first senior goal on 22 December, netting his team's second in a 2–0 home success over CD Ariznabarra.

Guruzeta started featuring with the reserves in Segunda División B midway through the 2020–21 campaign. On 28 July 2023, after suffering relegation from Primera Federación with the B's, he left the Lions and signed for Sestao River Club also in the third division.

On 2 July 2024, after establishing himself as a starter at Sestao, Guruzeta agreed to a two-year contract with Segunda División side SD Eibar. He made his professional debut on 17 August, starting in a 1–0 Segunda División home win over CD Castellón.

== Personal life ==
Guruzeta's father, Xabier, was also a footballer; a central defender, he mainly represented Real Sociedad during his career. His older brother Gorka, who plays as a forward, was also groomed at Athletic.
