= Théo Zidane =

French footballer (born 2002)

Personal information
- Full name: Théo Zidane Fernández
- Date of birth: 18 May 2002 (age 24)
- Place of birth: Aix-en-Provence, France
- Height: 1.96 m (6 ft 5 in)
- Position: Midfielder

Team information
- Current team: Córdoba
- Number: 7

Youth career
- 2008–2010: Canillas
- 2010–2021: Real Madrid

Senior career*
Years	Team	Apps	(Gls)
2021–2024	Real Madrid B	93	(3)
2024–	Córdoba	57	(5)

International career
2018	France U16	1	(0)
2018–2019	France U17	16	(2)
2021	France U20	4	(0)
- * Club domestic league appearances and goals as of 6 June 2026

Théo Zidane Fernández (born 18 May 2002) is a French professional footballer who plays as a midfielder for Segunda División club Córdoba.

He is the son of former Real Madrid and French midfielder Zinedine Zidane.

== Early life ==
Théo Zidane was born on 18 May 2002 in Aix-en-Provence. He is the third son of former French footballer Zinedine Zidane. He has 3 brothers, Enzo, Luca, and Elyaz who are all professional footballers.

== Club career ==
Zidane is a youth product of Canillas, and moved to the youth academy of Real Madrid in 2010. He started playing with the Real Madrid B in September 2020. He started training with Real Madrid's first team in February 2021 when his father was the manager of the club. He featured as a substitute in a La Liga fixture in December 2023, but did not appear on the field, and never made a first team appearance for the club.

On 11 July 2024, Zidane signed a two-year contract with Segunda División side Córdoba CF.

== International career ==
Zidane is a youth international for France, having represented the France U16s, U17s, and U20s. He represented the France U17s at the 2019 UEFA European Under-17 Championship.

== Style of play ==
A midfielder like his father Zinedine Zidane, he was described by Real Madrid's website as a finisher with a varied repertoire in the box, a goalscorer, and known for his speed.

== Career statistics ==
=== Club ===
As of match played 2 May 2026

Appearances and goals by club, season and competition
Club	Season	League			Copa del Rey		Other		Total	
Club	Season	Division	Apps	Goals	Apps	Goals	Apps	Goals	Apps	Goals
Real Madrid Castilla	2020–21	Segunda División B	3	0	—		0	0	3	0
Real Madrid Castilla	2021–22	Primera División RFEF	22	0	—		—		22	0
Real Madrid Castilla	2022–23	Primera Federación	31	1	—		1 (Note: Appearance in 2023 Primera Federación play-offs)	0	32	1
Real Madrid Castilla	2023–24	Primera Federación	37	2	—		—		37	2
Real Madrid Castilla	Total		93	3	—		1	0	94	3
Córdoba	2024–25	Segunda División	36	5	1	0	0	0	37	5
Córdoba	2025–26	Segunda División	19	0	1	0	0	0	20	0
Córdoba	Total		55	5	2	0	0	0	57	5
Career total			148	8	2	0	1	0	151	8

== Honours ==
Real Madrid

- UEFA Champions League: 2023–24

Real Madrid Juvenil A

- UEFA Youth League: 2019–20
