= Álvaro Carrillo (footballer) =

Spanish footballer

Personal information
- Full name: Álvaro Carrillo Alacid
- Date of birth: 6 April 2002 (age 24)
- Place of birth: Murcia, Spain
- Height: 1.83 m (6 ft 0 in)
- Position: Centre-back

Team information
- Current team: APOEL
- Number: 16

Youth career
- 2007–2014: Barnés
- 2014–2015: Murcia
- 2015–2021: Real Madrid

Senior career*
Years	Team	Apps	(Gls)
2020–2024	Real Madrid B	72	(0)
2024	Real Madrid	0	(0)
2024–2025	Eibar	21	(1)
2025–2026	Huesca	33	(3)
2026–	APOEL	4	(1)

International career^{‡}
2018–2019	Spain U17	19	(0)
- * Club domestic league appearances and goals as of 10 November 2026 ‡ National team caps and goals as of 11 November 2019

Álvaro Carrillo Alacid (born 6 April 2002) is a Spanish professional footballer who plays as a centre-back for Cypriot First Division club APOEL.

== Club career ==
=== Real Madrid ===
Born in Murcia, Carrillo joined Real Madrid's La Fábrica in 2015, from Real Murcia. He made his senior debut with the reserves on 25 November 2020, starting in a 1–1 Segunda División B home draw against CD Atlético Baleares.

On 3 January 2023, Carrillo renewed his contract until 2025. He made his first team debut on 6 January 2024, playing the full 90 minutes in a 3–1 away win over Arandina CF, for the season's Copa del Rey; it was his only appearance with the main squad.

=== Eibar ===
On 12 July 2024, Carrillo signed a two-year deal with Segunda División side SD Eibar. He made his professional debut on 17 August, starting in a 1–0 home win over CD Castellón.

Carrillo scored his first professional goal on 23 August 2024, netting his team's second in a 2–2 away draw against Racing de Santander. On 5 August 2025, after losing his starting spot, he terminated his link by mutual consent.

=== Huesca ===
On 6 August 2025, SD Huesca announced the signing of Carrillo on a one-year contract.

=== APOEL FC ===
On September 3, 2026, APOEL announced the signing of Spanish centre-back Álvaro Carrillo. A product of the Real Madrid academy, Carrillo played for Real Madrid Castilla, Eibar and Huesca. During the 2025/26 season, he made 33 appearances, scoring 3 goals and providing 3 assists.

== Career statistics ==
=== Club ===
As of match played 25 May 2024

Appearances and goals by club, season and competition
Club	Season	League			Cup		Other		Total	
Club	Season	Division	Apps	Goals	Apps	Goals	Apps	Goals	Apps	Goals
Real Madrid Castilla	2020–21	Segunda División B	6	0	—		1 (Note: Appearance in 2021 Segunda División B play-offs)	0	7	0
Real Madrid Castilla	2021–22	Primera División RFEF	18	0	—		—		18	0
Real Madrid Castilla	2022–23	Primera Federación	28	0	—		4 (Note: Appearances in 2023 Primera Federación play-offs)	0	32	0
Real Madrid Castilla	2023–24	Primera Federación	20	0	—		—		20	0
Real Madrid Castilla	Total		72	0	0	0	5	0	77	0
Real Madrid	2023–24	La Liga	0	0	1	0	0	0	1	0
Career total			72	0	1	0	5	0	78	0

== Honours ==
Real Madrid

- Supercopa de España: 2023–24
- UEFA Champions League: 2023–24

Real Madrid Juvenil A

- UEFA Youth League: 2019–20
