= Slavy =

Spanish-Bulgarian footballer

Personal information
- Full name: Borislav Ivaylov Stankov
- Date of birth: 5 May 2002 (age 24)
- Place of birth: Huesca, Spain
- Height: 1.82 m (6 ft 0 in)
- Position: Forward

Team information
- Current team: Ponferradina
- Number: 8

Youth career
- Juventud Huesca
- Zaragoza
- Huesca
- 2018–2019: Valencia
- 2019–2021: Valladolid

Senior career*
Years	Team	Apps	(Gls)
2020–2023	Valladolid B	57	(9)
2021–2024	Valladolid	1	(0)
2023–2024	→ Unionistas (loan)	33	(13)
2024–2025	Eibar	5	(0)
2025	→ Villarreal B (loan)	18	(7)
2025–2026	Hércules	21	(2)
2026–	Ponferradina	15	(6)

International career
2020	Spain U18	4	(2)
2022	Bulgaria U21	4	(0)
- * Club domestic league appearances and goals as of 11:06, 9 June 2026 (UTC)

Borislav Ivaylov Stankov (Bulgarian: Борислав Ивайлов Станков; born 5 May 2002), commonly known as Slavy, is a professional footballer who plays as a forward for Spanish Primera Federación club Ponferradina. Born in Spain, he played for his country of birth at youth international level, before switching to represent Bulgaria.

== Club career ==
Born in Huesca, Aragon, Slavy joined Real Valladolid's youth setup in 2019, after representing Valencia CF, SD Huesca, Real Zaragoza and CD Juventud de Huesca. He made his senior debut with the reserves on 12 January 2020, coming on as a second-half substitute for Carlos Doncel in a 2–2 Segunda División B away draw against CD Izarra.

On 29 February 2020, Slavy renewed his contract until 2023, but suffered a serious knee injury in June which kept him sidelined for eight months. On 12 April 2021, he further extended his link until 2024.

Slavy scored his first senior goal on 18 September 2021, netting the B's first goal in a 2–2 home draw against UD San Sebastián de los Reyes in the Primera División RFEF. He made his first team debut on 8 October, replacing fellow youth graduate Toni Villa in a 1–1 Segunda División home draw against Málaga CF.

On 24 July 2023, Slavy was loaned to third division side Unionistas de Salamanca CF for the entire 2023–24 season. After scoring 13 goals for the club in the campaign, the Pucelanos announced his departure on 4 July 2024, as his contract expired.

On 10 July 2024, Slavy signed a two-year deal with SD Eibar in the second division. The following 7 January, after being rarely used, he was loaned to Villarreal CF B in the third division until June.

On 29 June 2025, Slavy moved to third division side Hércules CF. On 2 February 2026, Slavy joined Ponferradina, also in the third division.

== International career ==
Born in Spain, Slavy is of Bulgarian descent. He was a youth international for Spain, having represented the Spain U18s. In February 2022, it was reported that Slavy would switch allegiance to Bulgaria. On 15 March 2022 he received his first call-up for Bulgaria U21 for the UEFA Euro 2023 qualification matches against Netherlands and Wales on 25 and 29 March 2022.
