= Jonmi Magunagoitia =

Spanish footballer

Personal information
- Full name: Jon Mikel Magunagoitia Blasco
- Date of birth: 6 August 2000 (age 26)
- Place of birth: Amorebieta-Etxano, Spain
- Height: 1.83 m (6 ft 0 in)
- Position: Goalkeeper

Team information
- Current team: Eibar
- Number: 13

Youth career
- Amorebieta
- 2017–2018: Eibar

Senior career*
Years	Team	Apps	(Gls)
2018–2021	Vitoria	59	(0)
2018–2019	→ Amorebieta (loan)	14	(0)
2021–2022	Zamora	8	(0)
2022–2024	Amorebieta	48	(0)
2024–	Eibar	74	(1)
- * Club domestic league appearances and goals as of 6 June 2026

Jon Mikel "Jonmi" Magunagoitia Blasco (born 6 August 2000) is a Spanish footballer who plays as a goalkeeper for SD Eibar.

== Club career ==
Born in Amorebieta-Etxano, Biscay, Spain, Magunagoitia joined SD Eibar's youth setup in 2017, from hometown side SD Amorebieta. On 15 August 2018, after finishing his formation, he was loaned to the latter for one year, in Segunda División B.

Magunagoitia made his senior debut on 23 September 2018, starting in a 2–1 away win over Gimnástica de Torrelavega. The following 22 January, he returned to his parent club and was assigned to the farm team also in the third division.

Upon returning, Magunagoitia shared the starting spot with Markel Areitio as Vitoria suffered relegation. On 7 July 2021, after becoming a first-choice, he moved to Zamora CF in Primera División RFEF.

On 18 July 2022, Magunagoitia returned to his first club Amorebieta on a permanent deal. He contributed with 32 appearances during the 2022–23 season, as the club achieved promotion to Segunda División.

Magunagoitia made his professional debut on 10 September 2023, starting in a 1–0 away loss to Racing de Santander. He was mainly a backup to Pablo Cuñat during the campaign, as the club suffered immediate relegation.

On 2 July 2024, Magunagoitia signed a two-year contract with SD Eibar in the second division.
