= Jon Bautista =

Spanish footballer (born 1995)

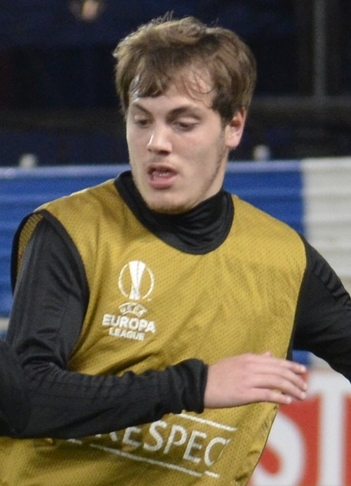
- Bautista with Real Sociedad in 2018

Personal information
- Full name: Jon Bautista Orgilles
- Date of birth: 3 July 1995 (age 31)
- Place of birth: Mahón, Spain
- Height: 1.80 m (5 ft 11 in)
- Position: Striker

Team information
- Current team: Eibar
- Number: 9

Youth career
- Touring
- Real Sociedad

Senior career*
Years	Team	Apps	(Gls)
2013–2017	Real Sociedad B	72	(28)
2016–2022	Real Sociedad	67	(6)
2019–2020	→ Eupen (loan)	26	(3)
2021–2022	→ Leganés (loan)	24	(1)
2022–	Eibar	146	(40)

International career
2018–2020	Basque Country	2	(1)
- * Club domestic league appearances and goals as of 00:58, 7 June 2026 (UTC)

Jon Bautista Orgilles (born 3 July 1995) is a Spanish professional footballer who plays as a striker for Segunda División club Eibar.

== Club career ==
=== Real Sociedad ===
Bautista was born in Mahón, Menorca, Balearic Islands, but moved to Errenteria, Gipuzkoa, Basque Country at a young age. He was a Real Sociedad youth graduate after starting out at Touring KE, and was promoted to the former's reserve team in the Segunda División B on 23 June 2014 having made several appearances in that season's UEFA Youth League.

Bautista made his senior debut on 23 August 2014, coming on as a late substitute for Eneko Capilla in a 3–3 home draw against UB Conquense in the Segunda División B. He scored his first senior goal on 27 September, opening the 4–0 home rout of CD Guadalajara.

On 25 February 2016, Bautista renewed his contract until 2020. He appeared in his first competitive match – and in La Liga – on 24 April, replacing fellow youth graduate Mikel Oyarzabal in the dying minutes of a 0–0 draw at Villarreal CF.

Bautista scored his first professional goal on 8 May 2016, the winner in a 2–1 home win over Rayo Vallecano. Ahead of the 2017–18 campaign, he was definitively promoted to the main squad.

On 11 July 2019, having been used mainly as a backup to Willian José first and Alexander Isak later, Bautista was loaned to Belgian club K.A.S. Eupen for one year. On 3 April 2021, he did not leave the bench for Real in the delayed 2020 Copa del Rey final against Athletic Bilbao, which ended in a 1–0 victory; additionally, he netted in both group-stage fixtures of the UEFA Europa League against HNK Rijeka (1–0 in Croatia, 2–2 at the Anoeta Stadium).

On 26 August 2021, Bautista moved to Segunda División side CD Leganés on a one-year loan deal.

=== Eibar ===
On 22 July 2022, Bautista signed a three-year contract with SD Eibar. He scored six goals from 40 appearances in his debut season, play-offs included.

== Personal life ==
Bautista's uncle, José María, was also a footballer. A left-back, he too was developed at Real Sociedad.

== Career statistics ==
As of match played 11 May 2024

Appearances and goals by club, season and competition
Club	Season	League			National Cup		Continental		Other		Total	
Club	Season	Division	Apps	Goals	Apps	Goals	Apps	Goals	Apps	Goals	Apps	Goals
Real Sociedad B	2014–15	Segunda División B	25	2	—		—		—		25	2
Real Sociedad B	2015–16	Segunda División B	29	14	—		—		—		29	14
Real Sociedad B	2016–17	Segunda División B	18	12	—		—		—		18	12
Real Sociedad B	Total		72	28	0	0	0	0	0	0	72	28
Real Sociedad	2015–16	La Liga	4	1	0	0	—		—		4	1
Real Sociedad	2016–17	La Liga	12	3	1	0	—		—		13	3
Real Sociedad	2017–18	La Liga	11	1	2	0	7 (Note: Appearances in UEFA Europa League)	1	—		20	2
Real Sociedad	2018–19	La Liga	18	1	1	0	—		—		19	1
Real Sociedad	2020–21	La Liga	21	0	0	0	5	2	1 (Note: Appearance in Supercopa de España)	0	27	2
Real Sociedad	2021–22	La Liga	1	0	0	0	—		—		1	0
Real Sociedad	Total		67	6	4	0	12	3	1	0	84	9
Eupen (loan)	2019–20	Belgian Pro League	26	3	1	0	—		—		27	3
Leganés (loan)	2021–22	Segunda División	24	1	2	2	—		—		26	3
Eibar	2022–23	Segunda División	38	6	1	0	2 (Note: Appearances in La Liga play-offs)	0	—		41	6
Eibar	2023–24	Segunda División	34	17	2	0	—		—		36	17
Eibar	Total		72	23	3	0	2	0	0	0	77	23
Career total			261	61	10	2	14	3	1	0	286	66

== Honours ==
Real Sociedad

- Copa del Rey: 2019–20

Individual

- Segunda División Player of the Month: March 2023, October 2023
