= Jorge Pascual =

Spanish footballer

Personal information
- Full name: Jorge Pascual Medina
- Date of birth: 9 April 2003 (age 23)
- Place of birth: Almería, Spain
- Height: 1.87 m (6 ft 2 in)
- Position: Striker

Team information
- Current team: Granada
- Number: 19

Youth career
- 2011–2014: CD Oriente
- 2014–2015: Almería
- 2015–2020: Villarreal

Senior career*
Years	Team	Apps	(Gls)
2020–2023	Villarreal C	69	(17)
2023–2024	Villarreal B	39	(4)
2023–2025	Villarreal	3	(1)
2024–2025	→ Eibar (loan)	40	(5)
2025–	Granada	35	(8)

International career
2019	Spain U16	3	(0)
- * Club domestic league appearances and goals as of 9 June 2026

Jorge Pascual Medina (born 9 April 2003) is a Spanish footballer who plays as a striker for Granada CF.

== Club career ==
Born in Almería, Andalusia, Pascual is a youth product of hometown sides CD Oriente and UD Almería. He joined Villarreal CF's youth setup in 2015, and was then assigned to farm team CD Roda and the Yellow Submarine over the course of the following five seasons.

Pascual made his senior debut with the C-team in the Tercera División, but had his development delayed by a sprained knee in 2022. On 23 February 2023, he signed a professional contract with Villarreal until 2026.

On 9 March 2023, before even having appeared with the reserves, Pascual made his professional debut with Villarreal in a 1–1 UEFA Europa Conference League tie with RSC Anderlecht. He made his La Liga debut on 24 May, in a 2–0 home win over Cádiz CF, and scored his first goal in the category on 4 June, netting a last-minute equalizer in a 2–2 home draw against Atlético Madrid.

After spending the 2023–24 season with the reserves in Segunda División, Pascual was loaned to fellow league team SD Eibar on 6 July 2024, for one year. On 30 July of the following year, he moved to Granada CF also in the second division on a permanent three-year contract.

== International career ==
Pascual is a youth international for Spain, having played for the Spain U16s in 2019. He has most recently been called up to the Spain U19s in January 2022.

== Playing style ==
Pascual is a left-footed striker who helps create goals. He positions himself well, who shoots specifically at the target. He is able to shoot well with both feet and has a good header.
