= Ander Madariaga =

Spanish footballer

Personal information
- Full name: Ander Madariaga Susaeta
- Date of birth: 11 March 2002 (age 24)
- Place of birth: Berango, Spain
- Height: 1.73 m (5 ft 8 in)
- Position: Attacking midfielder

Team information
- Current team: Eibar
- Number: 16

Youth career
- 2012–2016: Athletic Bilbao
- 2016–2017: Itzubaltzeta
- 2017–2020: Eibar

Senior career*
Years	Team	Apps	(Gls)
2020–2024	Vitoria	60	(7)
2024–	Eibar	57	(6)
- * Club domestic league appearances and goals as of 6 June 2026

Ander Madariaga Susaeta (born 11 March 2002), sometimes known as Mada, is a Spanish professional footballer who plays as an attacking midfielder for SD Eibar.

== Club career ==
Born in Berango, Biscay, Basque Country, Madariaga joined Athletic Bilbao's youth academy at Lezama in 2012, aged ten. He left the club in 2016, and spent a season at Itzubaltzeta FT (Getxo) before moving to SD Eibar's youth setup in 2017.

Promoted to the farm team CD Vitoria in August 2020, Madariaga made his senior debut on 25 October of that year, starting in a 0–0 Tercera División home draw against Club San Ignacio. He only became a starter for the B's in the 2022–23 season, and scored his first senior goal on 10 September 2022, netting the equalizer in a 3–1 home win over SCD Durango.

On 31 May 2023, Madariaga renewed his contract with the Armeros until 2025. He made his first team debut the following 21 January, coming on as a late substitute for Mario Soriano in a 3–2 Segunda División away win over SD Huesca.

On 31 July 2024, Madariaga further extended his link with Eibar until 2026, being promoted to the main squad. He scored his first professional goal on 14 December, netting his team's second in a 2–1 home win over Real Zaragoza.
