= Cristian Gutiérrez (footballer, born 2000) =

Spanish association football player

Personal information
- Full name: Cristian Gutiérrez Vizcaíno
- Date of birth: 30 November 2000 (age 25)
- Place of birth: Marbella, Spain
- Height: 1.77 m (5 ft 10 in)
- Positions: Left back; winger

Team information
- Current team: Cádiz (on loan from Las Palmas)
- Number: 22

Youth career
- 2012–2014: Vázquez Cultural
- 2014: Peña Los Compadres
- 2014–2016: Vázquez Cultural
- 2016–2017: Pablo Picasso
- 2017–2018: Marbella
- 2018–2019: Granada

Senior career*
Years	Team	Apps	(Gls)
2017	Pablo Picasso	2	(1)
2018	Marbella	3	(0)
2019–2020	Huétor Vega	26	(4)
2020–2022	Granada B	27	(0)
2020–2021	→ Atzeneta (loan)	20	(3)
2022–2023	Málaga B	6	(0)
2022–2023	Málaga	26	(2)
2023–2025	Eibar	67	(0)
2025–	Las Palmas	16	(1)
2026–	→ Cádiz (loan)	0	(0)
- * Club domestic league appearances and goals as of 3 June 2026

Cristian Gutiérrez Vizcaíno (born 30 November 2000) is a Spanish footballer who plays as either a left back or a left winger for Cádiz CF, on loan from UD Las Palmas.

== Club career ==
Born in Marbella, Málaga, Andalusia, Gutiérrez represented local sides CD Vázquez Cultural and CD Peña Los Compadres as a youth before making his senior debut with AD Pablo Picasso CF during the 2016–17 season, in Tercera Andaluza. In 2017, he moved to Marbella FC, also appearing with the first team in Segunda División B.

On 28 June 2018, Gutiérrez joined Granada CF and returned to youth football. He renewed his contract with the Nazaríes on 27 June of the following year, and subsequently started to feature with farm team CD Huétor Vega in Tercera División.

On 4 June 2020, Gutiérrez further extended his contract with Granada until 2022, and was loaned to Atzeneta UE in the third division on 11 September. Upon returning in June 2021, he was assigned to the reserves in Segunda División RFEF.

On 13 June 2022, Gutiérrez moved to another reserve team, Atlético Malagueño in Tercera Federación. He made his debut with the main squad on 12 October, coming on as a second-half substitute for Jozabed in a 1–0 Segunda División away loss against CD Leganés.

Gutiérrez scored his first professional goal on 16 October 2022, netting the opener in a 3–2 home win over CD Lugo. The following 28 February, his contract was renewed until 2026 after a clause was activated.

On 7 August 2023, after Málaga's relegation, Gutiérrez signed a four-year deal with SD Eibar in the second division. On 30 July 2025, he moved to fellow league team UD Las Palmas on a three-year contract.

On 9 August 2026, Gutiérrez was loaned to fellow division two side Cádiz CF for one year.
