= Matheus Pereira (footballer, born 1998) =

Brazilian footballer (born 1998)

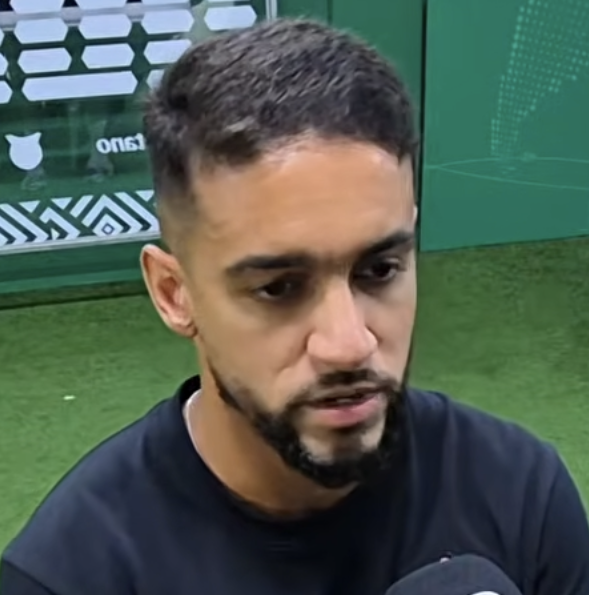

Personal information
- Full name: Matheus Pereira da Silva
- Date of birth: 25 February 1998 (age 28)
- Place of birth: São Paulo, Brazil
- Height: 1.83 m (6 ft 0 in)
- Position: Attacking midfielder

Team information
- Current team: Corinthians (on loan from Fortaleza)
- Number: 23

Youth career
- 2009–2016: Corinthians
- 2017: → Juventus (loan)

Senior career*
Years	Team	Apps	(Gls)
2015–2016	Corinthians	1	(0)
2016–2017	Empoli	1	(0)
2017–2020	Juventus	3	(0)
2017	→ Bordeaux II (loan)	2	(0)
2018	→ Paraná (loan)	2	(0)
2018–2019	→ Juventus U23 (res.)	22	(5)
2019–2020	→ Dijon (loan)	10	(0)
2020	→ Dijon II (loan)	1	(0)
2020	→ Barcelona B (loan)	0	(0)
2020–2022	Barcelona B	60	(7)
2022–2025	Eibar	111	(4)
2025–	Fortaleza	19	(1)
2026–	→ Corinthians (loan)	26	(0)

International career
2015	Brazil U17	8	(0)
- * Club domestic league appearances and goals as of 7 October 2026

Matheus Pereira da Silva (born 25 February 1998) is a Brazilian professional footballer who plays as an attacking midfielder for Corinthians on loan from Fortaleza.

== Career ==
=== Early life ===
Matheus began playing for Corinthians' academy at the age of eleven. He has been considered one of the club's most promising young players in years.

=== Corinthians ===
Matheus was elevated to the professional team in January 2015 for the team's pre-season in Florida, United States. He did not take part in any of the friendly matches, only participating in training sessions. He was a non-used substitute during several matches, most of them of the Campeonato Brasileiro Série A. He made his debut in a friendly match against ABC on 22 July 2015, playing the entire game, which was a celebration of ABC's centennial.

Matheus made his official debut on 23 August 2015 in the second half of Corinthians' 3–0 victory against Cruzeiro at Arena Corinthians. His first official start was against Santos in a Copa do Brasil match on 26 August.

=== Empoli and Juventus ===
On 28 June 2016, Matheus was signed by Serie A club Empoli F.C. In April 2016, it was reported that Matheus had completed a deal to sign with Juventus in the summer of 2016. However, as the Turin-based club had already exceeded their non-EU registration quota for international transfers, he would be signed by Empoli from Corinthians first, before joining Juventus.

On 31 January 2017, Matheus was signed by the Serie A club Juventus on loan.

On 31 August 2017, the last of day of the French and Italian summer transfer windows, he joined Bordeaux on loan from Juventus for the 2017–18 season, while Bordeaux secured an option to sign him permanently.

On 27 April 2019, Matheus played his first match both in Serie A and with the Juventus senior side, coming on as a substitute for Federico Bernardeschi late in the second half of a 1–1 away draw against rivals Inter; he almost scored the match-winning goal in the final minute.

==== Loan to Dijon ====
On 29 August 2019, he joined the French club Dijon on loan with an option to purchase.

=== Barcelona B ===
On 25 January 2020, Pereira was sent on loan to the Spanish club Barcelona B, in a deal involving Alejandro Marqués moving the other way. The club later activated his buyout clause.

=== Eibar ===
On 12 July 2022, Barcelona announced the transfer of Pereira to Segunda División side SD Eibar.

=== Fortaleza ===
On 27 May 2025, Pereira returned to his home country after nearly nine years, after signing a two-and-a-half-year contract with Fortaleza.

== Career statistics ==
As of match played 7 October 2026

Appearances and goals by club, season and competition
Club	Season	League			State League		Cup		Continental		Other		Total	
Club	Season	Division	Apps	Goals	Apps	Goals	Apps	Goals	Apps	Goals	Apps	Goals	Apps	Goals
Corinthians	2015	Série A	1	0	0	0	1	0	0	0	—		2	0
Empoli	2016–17	Serie A	1	0	—		1	0	—		—		2	0
Paraná (loan)	2018	Série A	2	0	5	0	0	0	0	0	—		7	0
Juventus U23	2018–19	Serie C	22	5	—		—		—		—		22	5
Juventus	2018–19	Serie A	3	0	—		0	0	0	0	—		3	0
Dijon (loan)	2019–20	Ligue 1	10	0	—		0	0	—		—		10	0
Dijon II (loan)	2019–20	National 3	1	0	—		—		—		—		1	0
Barcelona B (loan)	2019–20	Segunda División B	0	0	—		—		—		3 (Note: Three appearances in Segunda División B play-offs)	0	3	0
Barcelona B	2020–21	Segunda División B	24 (Note: Includes six appearances in second phase)	2	—		—		—		1 (Note: Four appearances in Segunda División B play-offs)	0	25	2
Barcelona B	2021–22	Primera División RFEF	36	5	—		—		—		—		36	5
Barcelona B	Total		60	7	—		—		—		4	0	64	7
Eibar	2022–23	Segunda División	41	2	—		2	0	—		—		43	2
Eibar	2023–24	Segunda División	37	1	—		1	0	—		—		38	1
Eibar	Total		78	3	—		3	0	—		—		81	3
Fortaleza	2025	Série A	19	1	—		0	0	—		1 (Note: Appearance(s) in Copa do Nordeste)	1	20	2
Corinthians	2026	Série A	20	0	5	0	3	0	2 (Note: Appearance(s) in Copa Libertadores)	0	1 (Note: Appearance(s) in Supercopa do Brasil)	0	31	0
Total			217	16	10	0	8	0	2	0	6	1	243	17

== Honours ==
Juventus

- Serie A: 2018–19

Corinthians

- Campeonato Brasileiro Série A: 2015
- Supercopa do Brasil: 2026

Brazil U17

- South American Under-17 Football Championship: 2015
