= José Corpas =

Spanish footballer

Personal information
- Full name: José Corpas Serna
- Date of birth: 7 July 1991 (age 35)
- Place of birth: Baños de la Encina, Spain
- Height: 1.74 m (5 ft 9 in)
- Position: Winger

Team information
- Current team: Albacete

Youth career
- 2007–2009: CD Linares

Senior career*
Years	Team	Apps	(Gls)
2009–2017	Linares Deportivo	251	(65)
2017–2018	Marbella	36	(8)
2018–2021	Almería	114	(19)
2021–2026	Eibar	193	(31)
2026–	Albacete	0	(0)
- * Club domestic league appearances and goals as of 6 June 2026

José Corpas Serna (born 7 July 1991) is a Spanish footballer who plays as a right winger for Albacete Balompié.

== Club career ==
Born in Baños de la Encina, Jaén, Andalusia, Corpas joined CD Linares' youth setup in 2007. After the club's dissolution in 2009, he moved to newly formed Linares Deportivo, and made his senior debut on 20 September of that year by starting and scoring the second in a 4–0 Primera Provincial home routing of Jódar EM.

Corpas featured regularly for Linares in the following campaigns, achieving promotion to Tercera División in 2012, and to Segunda División B in 2015. He renewed his contract for a further two seasons on 30 June 2015.

On 15 June 2017, Corpas signed for fellow third division side Marbella FC. On 3 July of the following year, he agreed to a two-year deal with Segunda División side UD Almería.

Corpas made his professional debut on 17 August 2018, coming on as a second-half substitute for fellow debutant Luis Rioja in a 0–1 away loss against Cádiz CF. He scored his first goal on 16 September, netting the winner in a 2–1 home defeat of Real Zaragoza.

On 24 October 2020, Corpas scored a hat-trick in a 3–0 home win over CF Fuenlabrada. The following 21 June, after scoring 12 goals, he moved to fellow second division side SD Eibar on a three-year contract.

On 4 June 2026, after being a regular starter during his five-year spell with the Armeros, Corpas joined Albacete Balompié in the same category on a two-year deal.
