= Gaizka Garitano =

Spanish football manager (born 1975)

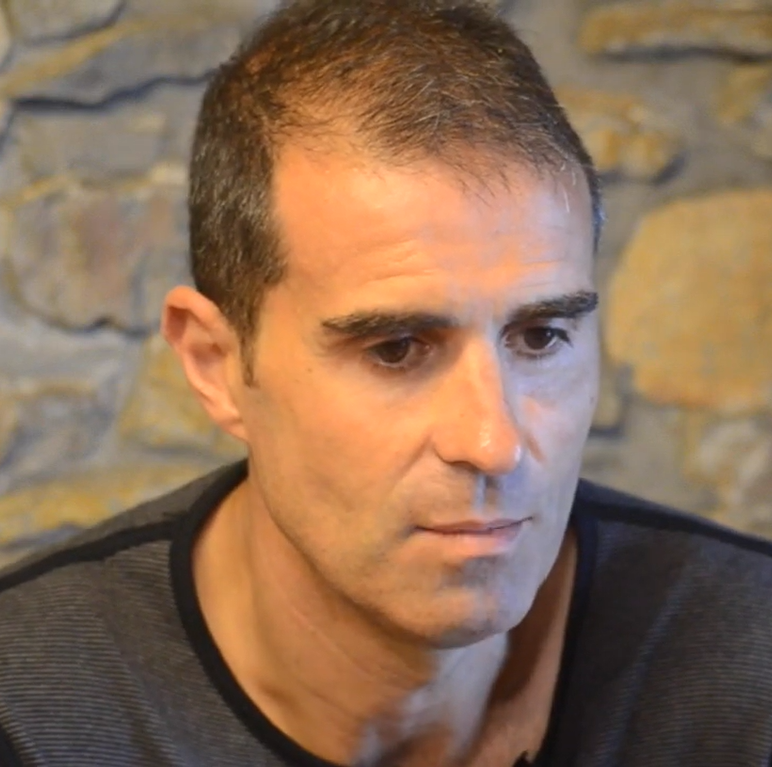
- Garitano in 2017

Personal information
- Full name: Gaizka Garitano Aguirre
- Date of birth: 9 July 1975 (age 51)
- Place of birth: Bilbao, Spain
- Height: 1.84 m (6 ft 0 in)
- Position: Midfielder

Youth career
- 1989–1993: Athletic Bilbao

Senior career*
Years	Team	Apps	(Gls)
1993–1998	Bilbao Athletic	112	(24)
1996–1997	→ Lleida (loan)	14	(0)
1997–1999	Athletic Bilbao	0	(0)
1998–1999	→ Eibar (loan)	18	(1)
1999–2001	Ourense	70	(8)
2001–2005	Eibar	146	(15)
2005–2008	Real Sociedad	81	(9)
2008–2009	Alavés	29	(2)
Total		470	(59)

International career
2003–2007	Basque Country	5	(0)

Managerial career
- 2009–2010: Eibar (assistant)
- 2010–2012: Eibar B
- 2012–2015: Eibar
- 2015: Valladolid
- 2016–2017: Deportivo La Coruña
- 2017–2018: Bilbao Athletic
- 2018–2021: Athletic Bilbao
- 2021–2023: Eibar
- 2023–2024: Almería
- 2024–2026: Cádiz
- * Club domestic league appearances and goals

Gaizka Garitano Aguirre (born 9 July 1975) is a Spanish former professional footballer who played as a midfielder, currently a manager.

Over 11 seasons as a player, he amassed Segunda División totals of 315 matches and 37 goals, mainly with Bilbao Athletic and Eibar. In La Liga, he represented Real Sociedad during the 2005–06 and 2006–07 campaigns.

Garitano entered coaching in 2009 with Eibar, being put in charge of the first team in 2012. He won consecutive promotions in his first two years, and reached the top division with the club in 2014. In the competition, he also managed Deportivo and Athletic Bilbao.

== Playing career ==
Garitano was born in Bilbao, Basque Country. Grown through the ranks of Athletic Bilbao, he would never make it past the reserves, his sole first-team appearance being as a late substitute in a UEFA Cup win away to Sampdoria in 1997. He also served loans at Lleida and Eibar.

In the summer of 1999, Garitano joined Segunda División B team Ourense. He finally settled at Eibar in the Segunda División – his second spell – and, in the 2004–05 season, as captain, led the side to a fourth place in the league, with chances of a historic La Liga promotion until the last matchday.

Garitano made his first top-flight appearances with Real Sociedad at the age of 30, his debut coming on 27 August 2005 in a 3–0 away defeat in the Basque derby. After three seasons in San Sebastián, during which the club was relegated in 2007, he joined neighbours Alavés, retiring in June 2009 at 34 after their relegation to the third division.

== Coaching career ==
=== Eibar ===
Immediately after retiring, having appeared in more than 300 matches in Spain's second tier, Garitano moved into coaching, serving as assistant at also recently-relegated Eibar. After a stint in charge of the reserves he was appointed first-team manager for the 2012–13 campaign, which included the elimination of Athletic Bilbao – the previous year's finalists – from the Copa del Rey, and ended with promotion.

Garitano repeated the feat the following season, topping the table and leading Eibar to the club's first ever top-division promotion. In June 2014, he renewed his contract.

In 2014–15, the team collected 27 points from the first 19 games but, after only eight in the following 19, was finally relegated back in spite of a 3–0 home win over Córdoba in the last matchday (they would later be reinstated at the expense of Elche). Subsequently, Garitano presented his resignation, stating he did not merit to continue.

=== Valladolid and Deportivo ===
Garitano signed with Real Valladolid on 6 July 2015, replacing the fired Rubi. On 21 October, as the side ranked dead last, he was dismissed.

On 10 June 2016, Garitano took over for Víctor Sánchez as Deportivo de La Coruña manager. Eight months later, with the team inside the relegation zone, he was sacked.

=== Athletic Bilbao ===
In summer 2017, Garitano was appointed head coach of Bilbao Athletic, replacing José Ángel Ziganda who had been promoted to the first team. He remained in that position until 4 December 2018, when it became his turn to be handed the senior role after Eduardo Berizzo, who had followed on from Ziganda's one-year stint, was also relieved of his duties after an even shorter spell. He was reunited with three of his trusted players from his Eibar spell: Dani García, Ander Capa and Yuri Berchiche.

On 4 April 2019, Garitano agreed to an extension at the San Mamés Stadium to run until 30 June 2020. On 1 June of the following year, having led the side to their first major final since 2015 (however, the 2020 Copa del Rey final was delayed due to the COVID-19 pandemic), he further renewed his link.

Garitano was fired on 3 January 2021, with the team in ninth place; he did not get to lead the team in the delayed cup final, which had been rescheduled for April of that year, and Marcelino García Toral immediately took over.

=== Return to Eibar ===
On 7 June 2021, Garitano returned to Eibar on a two-year deal with the option of a third; José Luis Mendilibar had stepped down following the side's relegation to division two. On 9 June 2023, after two consecutive eliminations in the promotion play-offs (both after the club missed out an automatic promotion spot in the last round of the regular season), he left by mutual consent.

=== Almería ===
On 8 October 2023, Garitano was appointed manager of Almería in the top tier, signing a contract until 2025. He was sacked the following 13 March, after failing to win any of the 19 league matches in charge.

=== Cádiz ===
On 8 December 2024, Garitano replaced Paco López at the helm of second-division Cádiz, on a deal until June 2026. He was relieved of his duties in March 2026, having collected just one point from eight games.

== Personal life ==
During his playing spell with Eibar, Garitano studied to become a journalist before beginning his sports coaching courses. He is the son of Angel Garitano (also known as 'Ondarru') who served for many years as assistant to Mané at managerial appointments including Alavés and Athletic Bilbao, and the nephew of former Athletic and Real Zaragoza midfielder Ander Garitano; they are distantly related to Juan Urquizu who also served Athletic as player and manager, while Gaizka's mother's family members include another man who performed both roles, Koldo Aguirre.

Garitano is not related to fellow Basque manager Asier Garitano, who also had playing spells with Bilbao Athletic and Eibar.

== Managerial statistics ==
As of 6 March 2026

Managerial record by team and tenure
Team	Nat	From	To	Record								Ref
Team	Nat	From	To	G	W	D	L	GF	GA	GD	Win %	Ref
Eibar B	(Spain)	25 May 2010	6 June 2012	76	21	22	33	67	95	−28	27.63	
Eibar	(Spain)	6 June 2012	9 June 2015	135	57	37	41	162	128	+34	42.22	
Valladolid	(Spain)	6 July 2015	21 October 2015	10	2	3	5	10	15	−5	20.00	
Deportivo La Coruña	(Spain)	10 June 2016	27 February 2017	27	5	9	13	32	44	−12	18.52	
Bilbao Athletic	(Spain)	7 June 2017	4 December 2018	55	28	14	13	99	46	+53	50.91	
Athletic Bilbao	(Spain)	4 December 2018	3 January 2021	89	37	23	29	107	88	+19	41.57	
Eibar	(Spain)	7 June 2021	9 June 2023	93	46	26	21	116	91	+25	49.46	
Almería	(Spain)	8 October 2023	13 March 2024	21	1	7	13	18	34	−16	4.76	
Cádiz	(Spain)	8 December 2024	9 March 2026	55	20	15	20	68	65	+3	36.36	
Total				561	217	156	188	678	606	+72	38.68	—

== Honours ==
=== Manager ===
Eibar

- Segunda División: 2013–14
