= SD Eibar C =

Eibar Urko
- Full name: Sociedad Deportiva Eibar "C"
- Nickname: Urko
- Founded: 2014
- Ground: Unbe, Eibar, Spain
- Capacity: 4,000
- President: Amaia Gorostiza
- Manager: Iñigo Pérez
- League: Tercera Federación – Group 4
- 2025–26: Tercera Federación – Group 4, 13th of 18
Home colours	Away colours

Sociedad Deportiva Eibar "C" is a Spanish football team based in Eibar, Gipuzkoa, in the autonomous community of the Basque Country. Founded in 2014, it is the second reserve team of SD Eibar, and plays in Tercera Federación – Group 4, holding home matches in the Unbe Sports Complex.

== History ==
Founded in 2014 as Urkomendi 14 Futbol Kirol (named after a local mountain), the club was created to accommodate young players who were released from SD Eibar. In June 2016, the club – then playing in the sixth-level Preferente de Guipúzcoa – joined the structure of Eibar, and became their second reserve team, behind CD Vitoria; they also changed name to SD Eibar Urko.

Eibar Urko achieved a first-ever promotion to the fifth division in 2018, and seemed set to advance further to the regional fourth tier (Tercera División) as 2019 champions of Gipuzkoa; however, Vitoria's relegation from the third level at the same time blocked Urko's promotion due to rules preventing teams owned by the same club competing in the same division. This also meant Urko could not be promoted at the end of the 2019–20 season either unless Vitoria achieved the same goal, but they were eliminated from the 2020 Tercera División play-offs. The outcome in 2020–21 was similar: Urko were permitted to take part in their promotion playoffs, although there was no possibility of going up as Vitoria did not qualify from theirs. It occurred again two years later, but in 2023–24 the goal was achieved – Vitoria won their Tercera Federación group and Eibar Urko were Gipuzkoa champions again, both being promoted directly. A month later, Eibar and Vitoria ended their agreement; an official reserve team, the reborn 'Eibar B', would now be above Urko (whose status was unchanged) and Vitoria would revert to the local amateur leagues.

== Season to season ==
Season	Tier	Division	Place
2014–15	7	1ª Reg.	1st
2015–16	6	Pref.	9th
2016–17	6	Pref.	5th
2017–18	6	Pref.	1st
2018–19	5	Div. Hon.	1st
2019–20	5	Div. Hon.	2nd
2020–21	5	Div. Hon.	1st
2021–22	6	Div. Hon.	2nd
2022–23	6	Div. Hon.	1st
2023–24	6	Div. Hon.	1st
2024–25	5	3ª Fed.	9th
2025–26	5	3ª Fed.	13th
2026–27	5	3ª Fed.	

- 3 seasons in Tercera Federación
