= SD Eibar B =

Eibar B
- Full name: Sociedad Deportiva Eibar B, S.A.D.
- Founded: 1994; 2024 (refounded)
- Ground: Unbe, Eibar, Basque Country, Spain
- Capacity: 1,000
- Chairman: Amaia Gorostiza
- Manager: Iñigo Pérez
- League: Segunda Federación – Group 1
- 2025–26: Segunda Federación – Group 2, 9th of 18
Home colours	Away colours

Sociedad Deportiva Eibar B, S.A.D. is a Spanish football team based in Eibar, Gipuzkoa, in the autonomous community of the Basque Country. They are the reserve team of SD Eibar. They play in Segunda Federación – Group 1, holding home games at Unbe Facilities, which held 1,000 spectators. Like the first team, they play in azulgrana – claret and blue – with blue shorts.

Founded in 1994 and dissolved in 2012, the B-team returned to an active status on 26 July 2024, after the affiliation agreement with CD Vitoria ended.

Former players include Ander Capa, Xabi Irureta, Iban Fagoaga, Ion Ansotegi and Jagoba Arrasate.

The team's final head coach in its first era was Gaizka Garitano, who then took charge of Eibar's first team and led them to the top tier via consecutive promotions.

== Season to season ==
Season	Tier	Division	Place
1994–95	7	2ª Reg.	2nd
1995–96	6	1ª Reg.	4th
1996–97	6	1ª Reg.	1st
1997–98	5	Reg. Pref.	1st
1998–99	4	3ª	13th
1999–2000	4	3ª	4th
2000–01	3	2ª B	14th
2001–02	3	2ª B	18th
2002–03	4	3ª	12th
2003–04	4	3ª	4th
2004–05	4	3ª	16th
2005–06	4	3ª	9th
2006–07	4	3ª	9th
2007–08	4	3ª	8th
2008–09	4	3ª	15th
2009–10	4	3ª	14th
2010–11	4	3ª	16th
2011–12	4	3ª	13th
2012–2024	DNP (Note: See CD Vitoria, farm team between 2015 and 2024.)		
2024–25	4	2ª Fed.	3rd

Season	Tier	Division	Place
2025–26	4	2ª Fed.	9th
2026–27	4	2ª Fed.	

- 2 seasons in Segunda División B
- 3 seasons in Segunda Federación
- 12 seasons in Tercera División

== Current squad ==
As of 1 September 2026

Note: Flags indicate national team as defined under FIFA eligibility rules; some limited exceptions apply. Players may hold more than one non-FIFA nationality.

No.	Pos.	Nation	Player
1	GK	ESP	Joseba Bermejo
2	DF	ESP	Llorenç Ferrés
4	DF	ESP	Oier Llorente
5	DF	ESP	Galder Herranz
6	MF	ESP	Asier Santolaya
7	FW	ESP	Carlos Lumbreras
8	MF	ESP	Óscar García
9	FW	ESP	Mario Fuente
10	FW	ESP	Iker Zubiría
11	FW	ESP	Marcos Sotelo
12	DF	ESP	Haritz Ortuzar

No.	Pos.	Nation	Player
13	GK	ESP	Marc Marroco
14	MF	ESP	Unax Bernal
16	MF	ESP	Jon Andoni Gromaz
17	DF	ESP	Miguel Álvarez
18	DF	ESP	Alex Llorens
19	MF	ESP	Iker Otadui
20	DF	ESP	Hugo Rastrilla
21	FW	ESP	Unai Garcés
23	DF	ESP	Xavier Pastor
27	MF	ESP	Beñat Alejo

=== Reserve team ===
Note: Flags indicate national team as defined under FIFA eligibility rules; some limited exceptions apply. Players may hold more than one non-FIFA nationality.

No.	Pos.	Nation	Player
28	MF	ESP	Aner Alberdi
29	MF	ESP	Markel Intxaurraga
