= CD Vitoria =

Association football club in Spain

Coordinates: 43.151843°N 2.973299°W

Vitoria
- Full name: Club Deportivo Vitoria
- Founded: 1945 as S. D. Armentia y Corres
- Ground: Complejo Deportivo de Unbe, Eibar, Spain
- Capacity: 4,000
- President: Jorge Ríos
- Head coach: Jokin Arambarri
- 2023–24: Tercera Federación – Group 4, 1st of 18 (champions)
- Website: http://www.clubdeportivovitoria.es
Home colours	Away colours

Club Deportivo Vitoria is a football team based in Vitoria-Gasteiz, in the autonomous community of Basque Country. Founded in 1945, the club has a senior side and a full youth system within its football section, as well as a basketball section.

== History ==
CD Vitoria was founded in 1945 and played in regional categories, promoting several times to third level. Historically, CD Vitoria had their own grounds (Campo Municipal Vitoriana) but for some years had played their home matches at the Betoño Sports Complex. In 2011, they gained promotion from the fifth tier with an unbeaten record.

In 2015, the club signed a collaboration agreement with SD Eibar and started to act as its farm team, initially playing home matches at Arrate stadium, in Nanclares de la Oca. Eibar had previously disbanded their own B team in 2012 to cut costs while their senior team languished in Segunda División B, but they were promoted up to La Liga in successive seasons and decided to seek a new formal arrangement for a subsidiary club. A few months after the agreement, Eibar acquired a local team to act as a further link between the youth level and Vitoria, to be known as Eibar Urko.

One year later, the club was promoted to Segunda División B for the first time, and moved back to Vitoria-Gasteiz to play at Estadio Olaranbe. This decision was controversial as both Deportivo Alavés and Aurrerá Vitoria (owner of the stadium until 1999) protested against it, claiming that the statutes of the ground only allowed its use by teams from the province of Álava – Vitoria met this requirement, but parent club Eibar (from Gipuzkoa) did not.

After securing their status in the division for a second season, in August 2018 Vitoria announced they would play their Segunda División B games at Estadio Ellakuri in the municipality of Laudio/Llodio, while maintaining their base football structure in Vitoria-Gasteiz. They were relegated in 2018–19, which also blocked Eibar Urko's promotion from the provincial level due to rules preventing teams owned by the same club competing in the same division. After Vitoria dropped down to the Tercera, home matches were moved to Eibar, playing at the town's Unbe Sports Complex. The COVID-19 pandemic in Spain led to the following season being halted early, but eventually the 2020 Tercera División play-offs took place: Vitoria were involved but failed to be promoted, again also blocking Urko's promotion. A similar situation occurred at the end of 2020–21 and in 2022–23, but the goal was achieved in 2023–24 – Vitoria won their Tercera Federación group and Eibar Urko were Gipuzkoa champions again, both being promoted directly.

On 26 July 2024, Eibar announced that the affiliation agreement between the club and Vitoria had ended, with the team which achieved promotion to Segunda Federación being fully integrated into Eibar's structure (as a reborn 'Eibar B') and Vitoria starting a new project at amateur level under their new board.

== Season to season ==
- As a separate club

Season	Tier	Division	Place	Copa del Rey
1948–49	5	2ª Reg.	2nd	
1949–50	4	1ª Reg.	5th	
1950–51	5	2ª Reg.	2nd	
1951–52	4	1ª Reg.	1st	
1952–53	4	1ª Reg.	6th	
1953–54	4	1ª Reg.	2nd	
1954–55	4	1ª Reg.	7th	
1955–56	4	1ª Reg.	2nd	
1956–57	3	3ª	11th	
1957–58	3	3ª	18th	
1958–59	4	1ª Reg.	2nd	
1959–60	3	3ª	12th	
1960–61	3	3ª	2nd	
1961–62	3	3ª	14th	
1962–63	3	3ª	17th	
1963–64	4	1ª Reg.	6th	
1964–65	4	1ª Reg.	8th	
1965–66	4	1ª Reg.	3rd	
1966–67	4	1ª Reg.	11th	
1967–68	4	1ª Reg.	6th	

Season	Tier	Division	Place	Copa del Rey
1968–69	4	1ª Reg.	5th	
1969–70	4	1ª Reg.	10th	
1970–71	4	1ª Reg.	14th	
1971–72	5	2ª Reg.	2nd	
1972–73	5	2ª Reg.	5th	
1973–74	5	2ª Reg.	2nd	
1974–75	4	Reg. Pref.	17th	
1975–76	5	1ª Reg.	1st	
1976–77	4	Reg. Pref.	16th	
1977–78	5	Reg. Pref.	20th	
1978–79	6	1ª Reg.	9th	
1979–80	6	1ª Reg.	15th	
1980–81	6	1ª Reg.	3rd	
1981–82	6	1ª Reg.	1st	
1982–83	5	Reg. Pref.	20th	
1983–84	5	Reg. Pref.	16th	
1984–85	5	Reg. Pref.	20th	
1985–86	6	1ª Reg.	10th	
1986–87	6	1ª Reg.	10th	
1987–88	6	1ª Reg.	6th	

Season	Tier	Division	Place	Copa del Rey
1988–89	6	1ª Reg.	2nd	
1989–90	6	1ª Reg.	9th	
1990–91	6	1ª Reg.	16th	
1991–92	6	1ª Reg.	16th	
1992–93	6	1ª Reg.	2nd	
1993–94	6	1ª Reg.	7th	
1994–95	6	1ª Reg.	12th	
1995–96	5	Reg. Pref.	17th	
1996–97	6	1ª Reg.	5th	
1997–98	6	1ª Reg.	5th	
1998–99	6	1ª Reg.	5th	
1999–2000	6	1ª Reg.	13th	
2000–01	6	1ª Reg.	5th	
2001–02	6	1ª Reg.	5th	

Season	Tier	Division	Place	Copa del Rey
2002–03	6	1ª Reg.	7th	
2003–04	6	1ª Reg.	2nd	
2004–05	5	Reg. Pref.	7th	
2005–06	5	Reg. Pref.	2nd	
2006–07	5	Reg. Pref.	1st	
2007–08	4	3ª	20th	
2008–09	5	Reg. Pref.	2nd	
2009–10	5	Reg. Pref.	6th	
2010–11	5	Reg. Pref.	1st	
2011–12	4	3ª	18th	
2012–13	5	Reg. Pref.	6th	
2013–14	5	Reg. Pref.	5th	
2014–15	5	Reg. Pref.	1st	

- As a farm team

Season	Tier	Division	Place
2015–16	4	3ª	6th
2016–17	4	3ª	2nd
2017–18	3	2ª B	15th
2018–19	3	2ª B	18th
2019–20	4	3ª	3rd
2020–21	4	3ª	1st / 4th
2021–22	5	3ª RFEF	6th
2022–23	5	3ª Fed.	2nd
2023–24	5	3ª Fed.	1st

- 2 seasons in Segunda División B
- 12 seasons in Tercera División
- 3 seasons in Tercera Federación/Tercera División RFEF
