= 2021–22 SD Eibar season =

SD Eibar
2021–22 season
- President: Amaia Gorostiza
- Head coach: Gaizka Garitano
- Stadium: Ipurua
- Segunda División: 3rd
- Copa del Rey: Round of 32
- Top goalscorer: League: Stoichkov (21); All: Stoichkov (21)
Home colours	Away colours

The 2021–22 season was the 82nd season in the existence of SD Eibar and the club's first season back in the second division of Spanish football since 2014. In addition to the domestic league, Eibar participated in this season's edition of the Copa del Rey.

== Players ==
=== First-team squad ===
As of 1 February 2022

Note: Flags indicate national team as defined under FIFA eligibility rules; some limited exceptions apply. Players may hold more than one non-FIFA nationality.

No.	Pos.	Nation	Player
1	GK	ESP	Ander Cantero
2	DF	ARG	Esteban Burgos
3	DF	POR	Frederico Venâncio
4	DF	ESP	Rober Correa
5	DF	ESP	Xabier Etxeita
6	MF	ESP	Sergio Álvarez
7	FW	ESP	Quique
8	MF	ESP	Óscar Sielva
9	FW	ESP	Fran Sol (on loan from Dynamo Kyiv)
10	MF	ESP	Edu Expósito (vice-captain)
11	MF	ARG	Franchu
12	FW	ESP	Fernando Llorente
13	GK	ESP	Yoel (3rd captain)

No.	Pos.	Nation	Player
14	MF	ESP	Javi Muñoz
15	DF	ESP	Álvaro Tejero
17	MF	ESP	José Corpas
18	DF	ESP	Toño
19	FW	ESP	Stoichkov
20	FW	ARG	Gustavo Blanco (on loan from Antalyaspor)
21	MF	FRA	Yanis Rahmani
22	MF	ESP	Ager Aketxe
23	DF	ESP	Anaitz Arbilla (captain)
24	DF	ESP	Antonio Glauder
25	DF	ESP	Chema (on loan from Getafe)
33	MF	ESP	Miguel Atienza

== Transfers ==
Date	Name	Moving from	Moving to	Fee
11 January 2022	(Spain) Chema	Getafe	Eibar	Loan
31 January 2022	(Spain) Roberto Olabe	Eibar	Alcorcón	Undisclosed

== Pre-season and friendlies ==
Win Draw Loss

17 July 2021 Friendly	Calahorra	2–1	Eibar	Calahorra, Spain
19:00 CEST (UTC+2)				Stadium: Estadio La Planilla

24 July 2021 Friendly	Real Sociedad B	1–2	Eibar	Zarautz, Spain
11:00 CEST (UTC+2)				Stadium: Estadio Asti Kirol Instalakuntzak

31 July 2021 Friendly	Greuther Fürth	Cancelled	Eibar	Ismaning, Germany
17:30 CEST (UTC+2)				Stadium: Stadion an der Lindenstraße

4 August 2021 Friendly	Amorebieta	2–1	Eibar	Amorebieta-Etxano, Spain
18:00 CEST (UTC+2)				Stadium: Urritxe

6 August 2021 Friendly	Real Sociedad	3–1	Eibar	Lasarte-Oria, Spain
11:00 CEST (UTC+2)	Isak 38'; Illarramendi (yellow card) 41'; Januzaj 67'; Zaldúa 89'		Corpas 31'	Stadium: Zubieta Facilities; Referee: Ekaitz García Arriola

14 January 2022 Friendly	Real Unión	0–1	Eibar	Irun, Spain
11:00 CEST (UTC+2)				Stadium: Stadium Gal

== Competitions ==
=== Overall record ===
Competition	First match	Last match	Starting round	Final position	Record							
Competition	First match	Last match	Starting round	Final position	Pld	W	D	L	GF	GA	GD	Win %
Segunda División	13 August 2021	29 May 2022	Matchday 1	3rd	42	23	11	8	61	45	+16	54.76
Segunda División promotion play-offs	2 June 2022	5 June 2022	Semi-finals	Semi-finals	2	1	0	1	1	2	−1	50.00
Copa del Rey	2 December 2022	5 January 2022	First round	Round of 32	3	2	0	1	5	4	+1	66.67
Total					47	26	11	10	67	51	+16	55.32

Source: Soccerway

=== Segunda División ===
==== League table ====
Pos	Team	Pld	W	D	L	GF	GA	GD	Pts	Qualification or relegation
1	Almería (C, P)	42	24	9	9	68	35	+33	81 (Note: Almería finished ahead of Valladolid on head-to-head points: Almería 3–1 Valladolid, Valladolid 2–2 Almería.)	Promotion to La Liga
2	Valladolid (P)	42	24	9	9	71	43	+28	81	Promotion to La Liga
3	Eibar	42	23	11	8	61	45	+16	80	Qualification for promotion play-offs
4	Las Palmas	42	19	13	10	57	47	+10	70	Qualification for promotion play-offs
5	Tenerife	42	20	9	13	53	37	+16	69	Qualification for promotion play-offs

Source: LaLiga SmartBank
Rules for classification: 1) points; 2) head-to-head points; 3) head-to-head goal difference; 4) goal difference; 5) number of goals scored
(C) Champions; (P) Promoted

==== Results summary ====
Overall								Home						Away					
Pld	W	D	L	GF	GA	GD	Pts	W	D	L	GF	GA	GD	W	D	L	GF	GA	GD
42	23	11	8	61	45	+16	80	14	5	2	35	19	+16	9	6	6	26	26	0

Source: La Liga SmartBank

==== Results by round ====
Round	1	2	3	4	5	6	7	8	9	10	11	12	13	14	15	16	17	18	19	20	21	22	23	24	25	26	27	28	29	30	31	32	33	34	35	36	37	38	39	40	41	42
Ground	A	H	A	H	A	H	A																																			
Result	L	L	W	D	W	W																																				
Position	21	20	14	18	10	6	6	5	5	4	2	2	2	2	2	2	2	2	3	3	2	2	3	1	1	1	1	1	1	1	1	1	1	1	1	1	1	1	2	2	1	3

Updated to match(es) played on 29 May 2022. Source: La Liga SmartBank
A = Away; H = Home; W = Win; D = Draw; L = Loss

==== Matches ====
The league fixtures were announced on 30 June 2021.

13 August 2021 1	Huesca	2–0	Eibar	Huesca
20:00 CEST (UTC+2)	Muñoz 21'; Seoane 68'	Report		Stadium: El Alcoraz; Attendance: 2,944; Referee: José Antonio López Toca

22 August 2021 2	Eibar	0–1	Ponferradina	Eibar
19:30 CEST (UTC+2)		Report	Naranjo 57'	Stadium: Ipurua; Attendance: 1,146; Referee: Álvaro Moreno Aragón

29 August 2021 3	Burgos	0–1	Eibar	Burgos
22:00 CEST (UTC+2)		Report	Corpas 76'	Stadium: Estadio El Plantío; Referee: David Gálvez Rascón

4 September 2021 4	Eibar	1–1	Leganés	Eibar
16:00 CEST (UTC+2)	Expósito 40'	Report	Cantero 24' (o.g.)	Stadium: Ipurua; Referee: Luis Mario Milla Alvendiz

11 September 2021 5	Real Sociedad B	2–3	Eibar	San Sebastián
16:00 CEST (UTC+2)		Report		Stadium: Anoeta; Referee: Juan Luis Pulido Santana

19 September 2021 6	Eibar	3–2	Sporting Gijón	Eibar
18:15 CEST (UTC+2)				Stadium: Ipurua

25 September 2021 7	Amorebieta	1–1	Eibar	Lezama
18:15 CEST (UTC+2)				Stadium: Lezama (field 2)

3 October 2021 8	Eibar	3–1	Ibiza	Eibar
14:00 CEST (UTC+2)	Fran Sol 39'; Germán Parreño 65' (o.g.); Stoichkov 86'	Report	Cristian 27'	Stadium: Ipurua; Attendance: 2,719; Referee: (Spain) Eduardo Prieto Iglesias

9 October 2021 9	Mirandés	3–3	Eibar	Miranda de Ebro
16:00 CEST (UTC+2)	Simón Moreno 8'; Iñigo Vicente 72' (pen.); Brugui 90'	Report	Stoichkov 32' (yellow card) 55'; José Corpas 37' (pen.); Edu Expósito 53'	Stadium: Estadio Municipal de Anduva; Attendance: 2,953; Referee: (Spain) Dámaso Arcediano Monescillo

15 October 2021 10	Eibar	1–0	Almería	Eibar
21:00 CEST (UTC+2)	Stoichkov 39'; Álvaro Tejero (yellow card) 58'; Javi Muñoz (yellow card) 84'; Yoel (yellow card) 90+1'	Report	Álex Centelles (yellow card) 18'; Portillo (yellow card) 60'; Dyego Sousa (yellow card) 83'; Samú Costa (yellow card) 87'	Stadium: Ipurua; Attendance: 3,630; Referee: (Spain) José López Toca

19 October 2021 11	Tenerife	0–1	Eibar	Santa Cruz de Tenerife
21:00 CEST (UTC+2)	Álex Corredera (yellow card) 33'; Pablo Larrea (yellow card) 35'; Víctor Mollejo (yellow card) 81' (red card) 86'; Míchel (yellow card) 90+2'	Report	Burgos (yellow card) 72'; Álvaro Tejero 75'	Stadium: Estadio Heliodoro Rodríguez López; Attendance: 9,283; Referee: (Spain) Iosu Galech Apezteguía

22 October 2021 12	Eibar	2–1	FC Cartagena	Eibar
21:00 CEST (UTC+2)	Javi Muñoz 6'; Blanco 9' (yellow card) 90+1'; Toño (red card) 43'	Report	Luna (yellow card) 30'; Delmás (yellow card) 44'; de Blasis 60'; Silva (yellow card) 72'	Stadium: Ipurua; Attendance: 4,097; Referee: (Spain) Rubén Ávalos Barrera

31 October 2021 13	Real Valladolid	2–0	Eibar	Valladolid
18:15 CEST (UTC+2)	Álvaro Aguado (yellow card) 10'; El Yamiq 68'; Toni Villa 81'	Report	Quique González (yellow card) 83'	Stadium: Estadio José Zorrilla; Attendance: 13,322; Referee: (Spain) Francisco Hernández Maeso

3 November 2021 14	Eibar	1–0	Real Oviedo	Eibar
21:15 CES (UTC+1)	Etxeita 90+4'	Report	Cornud (yellow card) 14'	Stadium: Ipurua; Attendance: 3,551; Referee: (Spain) Juan Pulido Santana

6 November 2021 15	Fuenlabrada	0–0	Eibar	Fuenlabrada
21:00 CET (UTC+1)	Dago (yellow card) 60'	Report	Etxeita (yellow card) 14'; Javi Muñoz (yellow card) 17'	Stadium: Estadio Fernando Torres; Attendance: 1,985; Referee: (Spain) Víctor García Verdura

13 November 2021 16	Eibar	2–1	Alcorcón	Eibar
18:15 CET (UTC+1)	Stoichkov 12'; Edu Expósito 20'; Etxeita (yellow card) 57'	Report	Zarfino 42'; Lucho Vega (yellow card) 44'; Laure (yellow card) 45+2'; Bellvís (yellow card) 45+3'	Stadium: Ipurua; Attendance: 4,613; Referee: (Spain) Oliver De la Fuente Ramos

21 November 2021 17	Lugo	2–2	Eibar	Lugo
16:00 CET (UTC+1)	Chris Ramos 28' 33'; Josep Señé (yellow card) 45+2'; Ricard Sánchez (red card) 57'; Manu Barreiro (yellow card) 90+1'	Report	Sergio Álvarez (yellow card) 17'; Edu Expósito 34'; Quique González (yellow card) 42'; José Corpas 59' (pen.)	Stadium: Estadio Anxo Carro; Attendance: 2,709; Referee: (Spain) Saúl Ais Reig

29 November 2021 18	Eibar	4–2	Girona	Eibar
21:00 CET (UTC+1)	Javi Muñoz 16'; Etxeita (yellow card) 18'; Edu Expósito (yellow card) 25'; Fran Sol (yellow card) 36'; Stoichkov 40'; Sergio Álvarez 52'; Álvaro Tejero 84'	Report	Stuani 20' (pen.); Kebe (yellow card) 64'; David Juncà (red card) 73'; Bustos 78'	Stadium: Ipurua; Attendance: 3,200; Referee: (Spain) Iván Caparrós Hernández

6 December 2021 19	Zaragoza	1–0	Eibar	Zaragoza
16:00 CET (UTC+1)	Alejandro Francés 60'	Report	Toño (yellow card) 31'; Stoichkov (yellow card) 63'	Stadium: La Romareda; Attendance: 16,109; Referee: (Spain) Javier Iglesias Villanueva

11 December 2021 20	Eibar	2–2	Málaga	Eibar
20:30 CET (UTC+1)	Stoichkov 25' (pen.); José Corpas 27' (yellow card) 80'; Sergio Álvarez (yellow card) 89'	Report	Gassama 6'; Lombán (yellow card) 23'; Brandon Thomas 82'	Stadium: Ipurua; Attendance: 3,921; Referee: (Spain) Rubén Ávalos Barrera

18 December 2021 21	Las Palmas	0–1	Eibar	Las Palmas
18:15 CET (UTC+1)	Eric Curbelo (yellow card) 45'; Alberto Moleiro (yellow card) 65'; Álex Díez (yellow card) 69'; Raúl Navas (yellow card) 74'; Peñaranda (yellow card) 90+6'	Report	Javi Muñoz (yellow card) 13'; Sergio Álvarez (yellow card) 26'; Stoichkov 35'; Álvaro Tejero (yellow card) 47'; Arbilla (yellow card) 65'; Blanco (yellow card) 90+4'; Roberto Olabe (yellow card) 90+5'	Stadium: Estadio Gran Canaria; Attendance: 10,331; Referee: (Spain) Eduardo Prieto Iglesias

31 December 2021 22	Eibar	3–2	Real Sociedad B	Eibar
16:15 CET (UTC+2)	Blanco 2' (yellow card) 52'; Blasco 31' (o.g.); Muñoz (yellow card) 66'; Stoichkov (yellow card) 70'; Expósito 89'		Blasco (yellow card) 30' (goal) 81'; Magunazelaia 59'	Stadium: Ipurua Municipal Stadium; Attendance: 4,105; Referee: (Spain) Oliver De La Fuent

10 January 2022 23	Real Oviedo	1–1	Eibar	Oviedo
21:00 CET (UTC+2)	David Costas 19'; Cornud (yellow card) 49'	Report	Álvaro Tejero (yellow card) 40' (goal) 87'; Arbilla (yellow card) 52'; Javi Muñoz (yellow card) 90+2'	Stadium: Estadio Carlos Tartiere; Attendance: 7,614; Referee: (Spain) Juan Pulido Santana

24 January 2022 24	Almería	0–2	Eibar	Almería
21:00 CET (UTC+2)	Samú Costa (yellow card) 46'	Report	Edu Expósito 9'; Stoichkov (yellow card) 49'; Sergio Álvarez (yellow card) 59'; Toño (yellow card) 72'; Quique González 81'	Stadium: Estadio de los Juegos Mediterráneos; Attendance: 7,843; Referee: (Spain) Daniel Trujillo Suárez

29 January 2022 25	Eibar	2–1	Huesca	Eibar
18:15 CET (UTC+2)	Javi Muñoz (yellow card) 33'; Frederico Venâncio (yellow card) 58'; Stoichkov 75' 85'	Report	Timor (yellow card) 10'; Ignasi Miquel (yellow card) 34'; Rațiu (yellow card) 40'; Jaime Seoane 52'; Dani Escriche (yellow card) 58'; Joaquín Muñoz (yellow card) 61'	Stadium: Ipurua; Attendance: 5,121; Referee: (Spain) Dámaso Arcediano Monescillo

5 February 2022 26	Sporting Gijón	0–1	Eibar	Gijón
20:30 CEST (UTC+2)	Ramírez (yellow card) 89'; Fran Villalba (yellow card) 90+3'	Report	José Corpas 20'; Stoichkov (yellow card) 49'; Miguel Atienza (yellow card) 90+3'	Stadium: El Molinón; Attendance: 15,575; Referee: (Spain) José López Toca

13 February 2022 27	Eibar	0–0	Fuenlabrada	Eibar
14:00 CEST (UTC+2)	Quique González (yellow card) 29'	Report	Mikel Iribas (yellow card) 78'	Stadium: Ipurua; Attendance: 4,633; Referee: (Spain) Javier Iglesias Villanueva

19 February 2022 28	Girona	0–1	Eibar	Girona
18:15 CEST (UTC+2)	Juanpe (yellow card) 41'; Espinosa (yellow card) 74'	Report	Toño (yellow card) 30'; Stoichkov 42'; José Corpas (yellow card) 54'; Arbilla (yellow card) 89'; Etxeita (yellow card) 90+4' (yellow-red card) 90+4'	Stadium: Estadi Montilivi; Attendance: 6,511; Referee: (Spain) Oliver De La Fuente

27 February 2022 29	Eibar	2–0	Burgos	Eibar
14:00 CET (UTC+1)	Blanco 3'; José Corpas 57'; Rahmani (yellow card) 88'	Report	Pablo Valcarce (yellow card) 41'; Unai Elgezabal (yellow card) 71'; Grego (yellow card) 74'	Stadium: Ipurua; Attendance: 5,135; Referee: (Spain) Juan Pulido Santana

6 March 2022 30	FC Cartagena	4–1	Eibar	Cartagena
18:15 CET (UTC+1)	Bodiger 45' 90+6'; Dauda 52'; Marc Martínez (yellow card) 80'; Alfredo Ortuño 89'; Alcalá (yellow card) 90+4'	Report	Stoichkov 19' (yellow card) 80' (red card) 90+5'; Arbilla (yellow card) 35'; Toño (yellow card) 44'; Miguel Atienza (yellow card) 54'; Fran Sol (yellow card) 57'; Javi Muñoz (yellow card) 77'	Stadium: Estadio Cartagonova; Attendance: 5,097; Referee: (Spain) Rubén Ávalos Barrera

13 March 2022 31	Eibar	1–0	Amorebieta	Eibar
16:00 CET (UTC+1)	Stoichkov 1'; Frederico Venâncio (yellow card) 77'	Report		Stadium: Ipurua; Attendance: 5,741; Referee: (Spain) Saúl Ais Reig

20 March 2022 32	Ponferradina	2–2	Eibar	Ponferrada
16:00 CET (UTC+1)	Sergi Enrich 5' (yellow card) 28'; Ricard Pujol (yellow card) 31'; Kike Saverio (red card) 35'; Yuri 43'	Report	Stoichkov (yellow card) 61'; Chema (yellow card) 64'; Álvaro Tejero (yellow card) 77'; Llorente 74' (red card) 79'; Frederico Venâncio (yellow card) 90+1'; Fran Sol 90+1'	Stadium: Estadio El Toralín; Attendance: 5,414; Referee: (Spain) Álvaro Moreno Aragón

26 March 2022 33	Eibar	1–0	Lugo	Eibar
16:00 CET (UTC+1)	Edu Expósito (yellow card) 30'; Fran Sol 65'; Miguel Atienza (yellow card) 81'; Sergio Álvarez (yellow card) 83'; Javi Muñoz (yellow card) 90+6'	Report	Ricard Sánchez (yellow card) 26'; Chris Ramos (yellow card) 71'; Lebedenko (yellow card) 79'	Stadium: Ipurua; Attendance: 5,103; Referee: (Spain) Víctor García Verdura

3 April 2022 34	Eibar	1–1	Mirandés	Eibar
18:15 CET (UTC+1)	Stoichkov 49' (pen.); Antonio Glauder (yellow card) 73'	Report	Sergio Camello (yellow card) 50'; Alejandro Marqués 79'	Stadium: Ipurua; Attendance: 6,023; Referee: (Spain) Iosu Galech Apezteguía

10 April 2022 35	Ibiza	2–0	Eibar	Ibiza
18:15 CET (UTC+1)	Cifu (yellow card) 7'; Ekain Zenitagoia 47'; Cristian 61'; Germán Parreño (yellow card) 74'	Report	Frederico Venâncio (yellow card) 13'; Álvaro Tejero (yellow card) 69'; Sergio Álvarez (yellow card) 86'	Stadium: Estadi Municipal de Can Misses; Attendance: 5,012; Referee: (Spain) Saúl Ais Reig

15 April 2022 36	Eibar	2–2	Las Palmas	Eibar
18:30 CET (UTC+1)	Stoichkov 4'; Etxeita (yellow card) 70'; Chema (yellow card) 76'; Llorente 80'	Report	Sadiku 22'; Jesé (yellow card) 23' (goal) 45' (pen.); Álvaro Lemos (yellow card) 70'; Fabio González (yellow card) 90+2'	Stadium: Ipurua; Attendance: 4,110; Referee: (Spain) José López Toca

23 April 2022 37	Málaga	1–3	Eibar	Málaga
18:30 CET (UTC+1)	Brandon Thomas 4' (yellow card) 90+4'; Alberto Escassi (red card) 31'; Javi Jiménez (yellow card) 43'; Ramón Enríquez (yellow card) 45'; Kevin Villodres (yellow card) 50'; Luis Muñoz (red card) 69'; Dani Barrio (yellow card) 69'; Paulino (yellow card) 70'; Víctor Gómez (yellow card) 90+5'	Report	José Corpas 37' (pen.); Toño (yellow card) 63'; Llorente (yellow card) 73'; Fran Sol 78' 90+6'; Álvaro Tejero (yellow card) 82'	Stadium: La Rosaleda; Attendance: 17,667; Referee: (Spain) Javier Iglesias Villanueva

30 April 2022 38	Eibar	2–0	Zaragoza	Eibar
18:15 CEST (UTC+2)	Stoichkov 51'; Antonio Glauder (yellow card) 59'; Lluís López 60' (o.g.)	Report	Alejandro Francés (yellow card) 43'	Stadium: Ipurua; Attendance: 5,973; Referee: (Spain) Daniel Jesús Trujillo Suárez

8 May 2022 39	Eibar	0–2	Valladolid	Eibar
16:00 CEST (UTC+2)	José Corpas (yellow card) 9'; Chema (yellow card) 13'; Burgos (yellow card) 25'; Ager Aketxe (yellow card) 71'; Javi Muñoz (yellow card) 90+3'	Report	Nacho (yellow card) 34' (goal) 68' (pen.); Álvaro Aguado (yellow card) 59'; Weissman 80'	Stadium: Ipurua; Referee: (Spain) Luis Mario Milla Alvendiz

14 May 2022 40	Leganés	2–3	Eibar	Leganés
21:00 CEST (UTC+2)	Javi Hernández (yellow card) 11'; José Arnaiz 45+3' (yellow card) 73'; Shibasaki 50'; Sergi Palencia (yellow card) 80'	Report	Nyom 21' (o.g.); Frederico Venâncio (yellow card) 26'; Stoichkov 29'; Rahmani 65'; Rober Correa (yellow card) 77'; Toño (yellow card) 86'; Yoel (yellow card) 90+5'	Stadium: Estadio Municipal de Butarque; Attendance: 5,752; Referee: (Spain) Francisco Hernández Maeso

21 May 2022 41	Eibar	2–0	Tenerife	Eibar
22:00 CEST (UTC+2)	Stoichkov 19'; Edu Expósito (yellow card) 57'; Chema 84'	Report	Enric Gallego (yellow card) 28'; Šipčić (yellow card) 30'; Matías Nahuel (yellow card) 68'	Stadium: Ipurua; Attendance: 7,131; Referee: (Spain) Rubén Ávalos Barrera

29 May 2022 42	Alcorcón	1–0	Eibar	Alcorcón
20:00 CEST (UTC+2)	Luis Valcarce (yellow card) 29'; José Ángel (yellow card) 35'; Óscar Rivas (yellow card) 89'; Zarfino 90+1'	Report	Fran Sol (yellow card) 5'; Frederico Venâncio (yellow card) 35'; Chema (yellow card) 63'; Miguel Atienza (yellow card) 86'	Stadium: Estadio Municipal de Santo Domingo; Referee: (Spain) Iván Caparrós Hernández

==== Promotion play-offs ====
2 June 2022 First Leg	Girona	0–1	Eibar	Girona
19:00 CET	Stuani (yellow card) 42'	Report	Ager Aketxe 28'; Chema (yellow card) 30'; Álvaro Tejero (yellow card) 45+2' (yellow-red card) 45+3'; Sergio Álvarez (yellow card) 82'; Ander Cantero (yellow card) 87'; Rober Correa (yellow card) 90+2'; Rahmani (yellow card) 90+3'	Stadium: Estadi Montilivi; Attendance: 9,450; Referee: (Spain) Luis Milla Alvendiz

5 June 2022 Second Leg	Eibar	0–2 (a.e.t.) (1–2 agg.)	Girona	Eibar
18:30 CET	Sergio Álvarez (yellow card) 27'; José Corpas (yellow card) 48'	Report	Borja García 1'; Juanpe (yellow card) 28'; Arnau Martínez (yellow card) 90'; Stuani 91' (yellow card) 119'; Juan Carlos (yellow card) 102'	Stadium: Ipurua; Attendance: 6,846; Referee: (Spain) Juan Pulido Santana

=== Copa del Rey ===
2 December 2021 First Round	Gernika	1–2	Eibar	Guernica
19:00 CET	Eneko Eizmendi (yellow card) 30'; Asier Arana (yellow card) 36' (goal) 71'; Álex Valiño (yellow card) 37'	Report	Quique González 36' (pen.); Blanco 62' (yellow card) 90'	Stadium: Estadio Urbieta; Referee: (Spain) Eduardo Prieto Iglesias

15 December 2021 Second Round	Tenerife	1–2	Eibar	Santa Cruz de Tenerife
21:00 CET	Elady Zorrilla (yellow card) 22'; Moore (yellow card) 37'; Sergio González 74'; Víctor Mollejo (yellow card) 82'	Report	Quique González 12'; Roberto Olabe (yellow card) 38'; Javi Muñoz (yellow card) 54'; Antonio Glauder (yellow card) 60'; Álvaro Tejero (yellow card) 74'; Edu Expósito 83'; Ander Cantero (yellow card) 90+4'	Stadium: Estadio Heliodoro Rodríguez López; Attendance: 24,000; Referee: (Spain) Luis Milla Alvendiz

5 January 2022 Round of 32	Eibar	1–2	Mallorca	Eibar
16:00 CET	Antonio Glauder (yellow card) 36'; Blanco (yellow card) 40' (goal) 45'; Javi Muñoz (yellow card) 76'	Report	Joan Sastre (yellow card) 62'; Josep Gayá 68'; Ángel 82'	Stadium: Ipurua; Attendance: 3,558; Referee: (Spain) Miguel Ortiz Arias
