= 2019–20 SD Eibar season =

Eibar
2019–20 season
- President: Amaia Gorostiza
- Head coach: José Luis Mendilibar
- Stadium: Ipurua
- La Liga: 14th
- Copa del Rey: Round of 32
- Top goalscorer: League: Fabián Orellana (8); All: Charles (9)
- Highest home attendance: 7,295 vs Barcelona (19 October 2019)
- Lowest home attendance: 5,341 vs Granada (19 October 2019)
- Average home league attendance: 6,076
Home colours	Away colours	Third colours

The 2019–20 season was SD Eibar's sixth straight season in La Liga. They also participated in the Copa del Rey.

== Players ==
As of 20 August 2019

Note: Flags indicate national team as defined under FIFA eligibility rules; some limited exceptions apply. Players may hold more than one non-FIFA nationality.

No.	Pos.	Nation	Player
1	GK	SRB	Marko Dmitrović
2	DF	ARG	Esteban Burgos
3	DF	ESP	Pedro Bigas
4	DF	ESP	Iván Ramis (Captain)
5	MF	ARG	Gonzalo Escalante (Vice-captain)
6	MF	ESP	Sergio Álvarez
7	FW	ESP	Quique González
8	MF	SEN	Pape Diop
9	FW	ESP	Sergi Enrich (3rd-captain)
10	MF	ESP	Edu Expósito
11	DF	POR	Rafa Soares (on loan from Vitória de Guimarães)
12	DF	POR	Paulo Oliveira

No.	Pos.	Nation	Player
13	GK	ESP	Yoel
14	MF	CHI	Fabián Orellana
15	DF	ESP	José Ángel
16	MF	ARG	Pablo de Blasis
17	FW	ESP	Kike
18	MF	URU	Sebastián Cristóforo (on loan from Fiorentina)
19	FW	BRA	Charles
20	DF	ESP	Rober Correa
21	MF	ESP	Pedro León
22	MF	JPN	Takashi Inui
23	DF	ESP	Anaitz Arbilla
24	DF	ESP	Álvaro Tejero

=== Reserve team ===
Note: Flags indicate national team as defined under FIFA eligibility rules; some limited exceptions apply. Players may hold more than one non-FIFA nationality.

No.	Pos.	Nation	Player
27	DF	ESP	Miguel Marí
29	MF	ESP	Ekhi Bravo

No.	Pos.	Nation	Player
31	GK	ESP	Sergio Cubero
33	MF	ESP	Miguel Atienza

== Transfers ==
=== In ===
Date	Pos.	Player	Age	From	Type	Fee	Ref
Summer
20 May 2019	CB/MF	(Spain) Pedro Bigas	36	Las Palmas	Buyout clause	€3,000,000	
24 May 2019	MF	(Spain) Pablo Hervías	33	Valladolid	Loan return		
27 May 2019	LB	(Spain) Marc Cucurella	28	Barcelona	Buyout clause	€2,000,000	
26 June 2019	FB	(Spain) Álvaro Tejero	30	Real Madrid	End of contract	Free	
30 June 2019	FW	(Spain) Nano	31	Tenerife	Loan return		
30 June 2019	CB	(Spain) José Antonio Martínez	33	Granada	Loan return		
30 June 2019	GK	(Spain) Yoel Rodríguez	38	Valladolid	Loan return		
30 June 2019	RB	(Spain) Jordi Calavera	31	Sporting Gijón	Loan return		
30 June 2019	CB	(Spain) Unai Elgezabal	33	Alcorcón	Loan return		
1 July 2019	CB	(Argentina) Esteban Burgos	34	Alcorcón	End of contract	Free	
2 July 2019	FW	(Spain) Asier Benito	31	Athletic Bilbao	End of contract	Free	
3 July 2019	DF	(Spain) Rubén Lobato	32	Oviedo B	End of contract	Free	
5 July 2019	RB	(Spain) Rober Correa	34	Cádiz	End of contract	Free	
7 July 2019	LW	(Spain) Roberto Olabe	30	Atlético Madrid	Transfer	€2,800,000	
13 July 2019	MF	(Spain) Edu Expósito	30	Deportivo La Coruña	Transfer	€4,000,000	
14 July 2019	FW	(Spain) Quique	36	Deportivo La Coruña	Transfer	€3,300,000	
24 July 2019	AM	(Japan) Takashi Inui	38	Real Betis	Transfer	€2,000,000	
Winter
11 January 2020	CM	(Uruguay) Sebastián Cristóforo	33	(Italy) Fiorentina	Loan		
22 January 2020	LW	(Spain) Roberto Olabe	30	Albacete	Loan return		
31 January 2020	LB	(Portugal) Rafa Soares	31	(Portugal) Vitória de Guimarães	Loan		
Total						▼€17,100,000	

=== Out ===
Date	Pos.	Player	Age	To	Type	Fee	Ref
Summer
24 May 2019	MF	(Spain) Pablo Hervías	33	Valladolid	Buy-back clause	€1,000,000	
12 June 2019	MF	(Spain) Pere Milla	34	Elche	Contract terminated		
27 June 2019	MF	(Spain) Joan Jordán	32	Sevilla	Transfer	€14,000,000	
30 June 2019	FW	(Spain) Marc Cardona	31	Barcelona	Loan return		
4 July 2019	RB/MF	(Spain) Rubén Peña	35	Villarreal	Transfer	€8,000,000	
7 July 2019	CB	(Spain) Unai Elgezabal	33	Alcorcón	Contract terminated		
16 July 2019	LB	(Spain) Marc Cucurella	28	Barcelona	Buy-back clause	€4,000,000	
4 August 2019	LW	(Spain) Roberto Olabe	30	Albacete	Loan		
6 August 2019	CF	(Spain) Asier Benito	31	Ponferradina	Loan		
7 August 2019	GK	(Spain) Asier Riesgo	42	Girona	End of contract		
10 August 2019	CB	(Spain) José Antonio Martínez	33	Granada	Loan		
13 August 2019	CF	(Spain) Nano	31	Cádiz	Loan		
17 August 2019	DF	(Spain) Rubén Lobato	32	Getafe CF B	Contract rescinded		
20 August 2019	RB	(Spain) Jordi Calavera	31	Girona	Loan		
Winter
22 January 2020	LW	(Spain) Roberto Olabe	30	Extremadura	Loan		
Total						▲€27,000,000	

=== Net totals ===
Summer: ▲€9,900,000

Winter: €0,000,000

Total: ▲€9,900,000

== Statistics ==
=== Appearances and goals ===
As of End of season

No.	Pos	Nat	Player	Total		La Liga		Copa del Rey	
No.	Pos	Nat	Player	Apps	Goals	Apps	Goals	Apps	Goals
Goalkeepers
1	GK	(Serbia) SRB	Marko Dmitrović	35	0	35	0	0	0
13	GK	(Spain) ESP	Yoel Rodríguez	6	0	3	0	3	0
Defenders
2	DF	(Argentina) ARG	Esteban Burgos	16	1	11+4	1	1	0
3	DF	(Spain) ESP	Pedro Bigas	24	3	21+2	3	1	0
4	DF	(Spain) ESP	Iván Ramis	7	1	6+1	1	0	0
11	DF	(Portugal) POR	Rafa Soares	6	0	6	0	0	0
12	DF	(Portugal) POR	Paulo Oliveira	28	1	23+3	1	2	0
15	DF	(Spain) ESP	Cote	28	1	27+1	1	0	0
20	DF	(Spain) ESP	Rober Correa	15	0	11+1	0	3	0
23	DF	(Spain) ESP	Anaitz Arbilla	24	1	22+2	1	0	0
24	DF	(Spain) ESP	Álvaro Tejero	20	0	16+2	0	0+2	0
Midfielders
6	MF	(Spain) ESP	Sergio Álvarez	20	0	14+4	0	2	0
8	MF	(Senegal) SEN	Pape Diop	30	1	25+5	1	0	0
10	MF	(Spain) ESP	Edu Expósito	38	4	24+11	4	0+3	0
16	MF	(Argentina) ARG	Pablo de Blasis	33	5	15+15	2	3	3
18	MF	(Uruguay) URU	Sebastián Cristóforo	19	0	9+9	0	1	0
21	MF	(Spain) ESP	Pedro León	32	2	23+8	1	0+1	1
22	MF	(Japan) JPN	Takashi Inui	29	2	23+6	2	0	0
27	MF	(Spain) ESP	Miguel Marí	4	0	0+1	0	3	0
31	MF	(Spain) ESP	Sergio Cubero	2	0	0	0	2	0
33	MF	(Spain) ESP	Miguel Atienza	4	0	0+3	0	0+1	0
Forwards
7	FW	(Spain) ESP	Quique	18	0	4+11	0	3	0
9	FW	(Spain) ESP	Sergi Enrich	32	1	21+9	1	0+2	0
17	FW	(Spain) ESP	Kike	27	5	20+7	5	0	0
19	FW	(Brazil) BRA	Charles	33	8	13+17	5	3	3
29	FW	(Spain) ESP	Ekhi Bravo	3	0	0	0	3	0
Players who have made an appearance or had a squad number this season but have left the club
5	MF	(Argentina) ARG	Gonzalo Escalante	24	0	18+5	0	1	0
14	MF	(Chile) CHI	Fabián Orellana	31	8	28+1	8	2	0

== Pre-season and friendlies ==
Win Draw Loss Fixtures

15 July 2019 Pre-season	Leioa	0–2	Eibar	Leioa, Spain
CEST (UTC+02:00)		Report	Kike 13'; Pedro León 30'	Stadium: Estadio Sarriena; Attendance: 400; Referee: Bikandi Garrido (Basque Country)

17 July 2019 Pre-season	Amorebieta	1–3	Eibar	Amorebieta-Etxano, Spain
19:00 CEST (UTC+02:00)	Ekain 76'	Report	de Blasis 7'; Pedro León 12'; Benito 74'	Stadium: Campo Municipal de Urritxe; Attendance: 300; Referee: Sánchez Asia (Basque Country)

20 July 2019 Pre-season	Bayer Leverkusen	2–2	Eibar	Zell am See, Austria
18:30 CEST (UTC+02:00)	Bellarabi 66'; Alario 85' (pen.)	Report	Bravo 33'; Benito 65'	Stadium: Stadio Alois Latini; Attendance: 500; Referee: Wolfram Aufschnaiter (Austria)

21 July 2019 Pre-season	Eibar	5–2	Kayserispor	Jenbach, Austria
18:00 CEST (UTC+02:00)	Pedro León 19'; Kike 40', 81' de Blasis 48'; Charles 79'	Report	Alkurt 27'; Bulut 60'	Stadium: Stadion Jenbach

27 July 2019 Pre-season	Beşiktaş	0–2	Eibar	Kössen, Austria
17:00 CEST (UTC+02:00)		Report	Kike 35'; Nano 80'	Stadium: Kaiserwinkl-Arena; Attendance: 200

28 July 2019 Pre-season	Werder Bremen	4–0	Eibar	Grassau, Germany
11:00 CEST (UTC+02:00)	Klaassen 51' (pen.); Osako 61'; Füllkrug 70', 75'	Report		Stadium: Sportzentrum Brandstätt; Attendance: 1,000

3 August 2019 Pre-season	Fortuna Düsseldorf	3–2	Eibar	Düsseldorf, Germany
15:00 CEST (UTC+02:00)	Ampomah 4', 81'; Hennings 53'	Report	Inui 20'; Benito 77'	Stadium: Paul-Janes-Stadion; Attendance: 3,500; Referee: Christian Bandurski (Germany)

4 August 2019 Pre-season	Fortuna Düsseldorf	1–2	Eibar	Düsseldorf, Germany
09:30 CEST (UTC+02:00)	Pledl 82'	Report	Charles 10'; Benito 35'	Stadium: Kleiner Kampfbahn Arena; Referee: Christian Bandurski (Germany)

8 August 2019 Pre-season	Osasuna	0–0	Eibar	Tafalla, Spain
19:30 CEST (UTC+02:00)		Report		Stadium: Campo de San Francisco; Referee: Imanol Irurtzun (Navarre)

10 August 2019 Euskal Herria Txapela	Real Sociedad	1–2	Eibar	Tolosa, Spain
20:30 CEST (UTC+02:00)	Isak 15'	Report	Paulo 22'; De Blasis 74'	Stadium: Berazubi; Referee: Sagúes Oscoz (Basque Country)

4 September 2019 Friendly	Eibar	2–2	Mirandés	Mondragón, Spain
18:30 CEST (UTC+02:00)	Escalante 79'; Enrich 85'		Rey 44' (pen.); Merquelanz 76'	Stadium: Atxabalpe

10 October 2019 Friendly	Toulouse	2–0	Eibar	Pau, France
19:00 CEST (UTC+02:00)	Leya Iseka 12'; Isimat-Mirin 25'	Report		Stadium: Stade du Hameau; Referee: Johan Hamel (France)

15 November 2019 Friendly	Athletic Bilbao	4–1	Eibar	Lezama, Spain
11:00 CEST (UTC+02:00)	Ibai 27'; Villalibre 33'; Kodro 70', 72'	Report	Charles 20'	Stadium: Lezama; Referee: Ekaitz Garcia (Basque Country)

== Competitions ==
Win Draw Loss

=== Overview ===
Competition	First match	Last match	Starting round	Final position	Record							
Competition	First match	Last match	Starting round	Final position	Pld	W	D	L	GF	GA	GD	Win %
La Liga	17 August 2019	19 July 2020	Matchday 1	14th	38	11	9	18	39	56	−17	28.95
Copa del Rey	17 December 2019	23 January 2020	First round	Round of 32	3	2	0	1	8	4	+4	66.67
Total					41	13	9	19	47	60	−13	31.71

Last updated: 19 July 2020
Source: Competitions

=== La Liga ===
==== League table ====
Pos	Team	Pld	W	D	L	GF	GA	GD	Pts
12	Levante	38	14	7	17	47	53	−6	49
13	Valladolid	38	9	15	14	32	43	−11	42
14	Eibar	38	11	9	18	39	56	−17	42
15	Real Betis	38	10	11	17	48	60	−12	41
16	Alavés	38	10	9	19	34	59	−25	39

Source: La Liga, Soccerway
Rules for classification: 1) Points; 2) Head-to-head points; 3) Head-to-head goal difference; 4) Goal difference; 5) Goals scored; 6) Fair-play points (Note: Head-to-head record is used only after all the matches between the teams in question have been played)

==== Results summary ====
Overall								Home						Away					
Pld	W	D	L	GF	GA	GD	Pts	W	D	L	GF	GA	GD	W	D	L	GF	GA	GD
38	11	9	18	39	56	−17	42	8	3	8	25	25	0	3	6	10	14	31	−17

Last updated: 19 July 2020.
Source: Competitive matches

==== Results by round ====
Round	1	2	3	4	5	6	7	8	9	10	11	12	13	14	15	16	17	18	19	20	21	22	23	24	25	26	27	28	29	30	31	32	33	34	35	36	37	38
Ground	A	A	A	H	A	H	H	A	H	A	H	A	H	H	A	H	A	H	A	H	A	H	A	H	A	H	H	A	H	A	H	A	H	A	H	A	H	A
Result	L	D	L	L	D	W	W	D	L	L	W	W	L	L	L	L	D	W	L	W	D	D	L	L	L	W	L	L	D	D	W	W	L	L	D	W	W	L
Position	14	16	18	19	19	16	11	14	16	16	14	14	15	16	16	16	16	16	16	16	15	16	16	16	16	16	16	16	16	17	17	15	16	17	15	15	13	14

Updated to match(es) played on 19 July 2020. Source: Competitive matches
A = Away; H = Home; W = Win; D = Draw; L = Loss

==== Matches ====
The La Liga schedule was announced on 4 July 2019.

17 August 2019 1	Mallorca	2–1	Eibar	Palma
20:00 CEST (UTC+02:00)	Rodríguez 4'; Sastre (yellow card) 14'; Paulo 75' (o.g.); Sevilla (yellow card) 90+5'	Report	Paulo 57'; Sergio A. (yellow card) 72'; A. Tejero (yellow card) 87'; Orellana (yellow card) 88'	Stadium: San Moix; Attendance: 15,127; Referee: Melero López (Andalusia)

24 August 2019 2	Osasuna	0–0	Eibar	Pamplona
17:00 CEST (UTC+02:00)	Nacho Vidal (yellow card) 11'; Chimy Ávila (yellow card) 16'; David García (yellow card) 30'; Darko (yellow card) 83'	Report	Paulo (yellow card) 65'; Sergio A. (yellow card) 23'; Arbilla (yellow card) 45+2'; Charles (yellow card) 90'	Stadium: El Sadar; Attendance: 13,978; Referee: Medié Jiménez (Catalunya)

1 September 2019 3	Atlético Madrid	3–2	Eibar	Madrid
19:00 CEST (UTC+02:00)	Félix 27'; Vitolo 52'; Thomas 90'	Report	Inui (yellow card) 4'; Charles 7'; Orellana (yellow card) 15'; Arbilla 19'; Dmitrović (yellow card) 69'	Stadium: Wanda Metropolitano; Attendance: 56,664; Referee: Jaime Latre (Aragon)

15 September 2019 4	Eibar	1–2	Espanyol	Eibar
12:00 CEST (UTC+02:00)	Cote (yellow card) 25'; N.E. Ramis 58'; Expósito (yellow card) 69'	Report	Naldo (yellow card) 48' (yellow-red card) 90+1'; Roca (yellow card) 61'; Ferreyra 76'; Granero 79'; Pedrosa (yellow card) 90+6'	Stadium: Ipurua; Attendance: 5,410; Referee: Pizarro Gómez (Community of Madrid)

21 September 2019 5	Levante	0–0	Eibar	Valencia
16:00 CEST (UTC+02:00)		Report	León (yellow card) 36'; Dmitrović (yellow card) 81'	Stadium: Ciutat de València; Attendance: 18,904; Referee: Alberola Rojas (Castille-La Mancha)

26 September 2019 6	Eibar	3–2	Sevilla	Eibar
19:00 CEST (UTC+02:00)	Arbilla (yellow card) 19'; Edu Expósito (yellow card) 56'; Orellana 66' (pen.); P. León 77'; Cote 82'; Paulo (yellow card) 90+4'	Report	Ocampos 11'; Óliver 33'; Escudero (yellow card) 49'; Jordán (yellow card) 70'; Gudelj (yellow card) 84'; Diego Carlos (yellow card) 90+1'	Stadium: Ipurua; Attendance: 5,434; Referee: González Fuertes (Asturias)

29 September 2019 7	Eibar	2–0	Celta Vigo	Eibar
14:00 CEST (UTC+02:00)	Arbilla (yellow card) 19'; Orellana (yellow card) 34', (goal) 60'; Edu Expósito 47'; Sergio A. (yellow card) 90+3'	Report	Lucas Olaza (yellow card) 22'	Stadium: Ipurua; Attendance: 5,453; Referee: Juan Martínez Munuera (Valencian Community)

4 October 2019 8	Real Betis	1–1	Eibar	Sevilla
21:00 CEST (UTC+02:00)	Canales (yellow card) 33'; Loren 66'; Fekir (yellow card) 79'; Mandi (yellow card) 88'	Report	Bigas (yellow card) 9'; Orellana 34' (pen.); Arbilla (yellow card) 57'; Escalante (yellow card) 65' (yellow-red card) 90+1'; A. Tejero (yellow card) 76'; P. Diop (yellow card) 80'	Stadium: Benito Villamarín; Attendance: 47,056; Referee: Hernández Hernández (Las Palmas)

19 October 2019 9	Eibar	0–3	Barcelona	Eibar
13:00 CEST (UTC+02:00)	Charles (yellow card) 24'; P. Diop (yellow card) 24'; Sergio A. (yellow card) 82'; Inui (yellow card) 88'; Edu Expósito (yellow card) 90+2'	Report	Griezmann 13'; Messi 58'; Suárez 66'	Stadium: Ipurua; Attendance: 7,295; Referee: Melero López (Andalusia)

26 October 2019 10	Valladolid	2–0	Eibar	Valladolid
18:30 CEST (UTC+02:00)	Guardiola 10'; Salisu 39', (yellow card) 77'	Report	Orellana (yellow card) 32'; P. Diop (yellow card) 60'	Stadium: José Zorrilla; Attendance: 20,036; Referee: José Luis Munuera Montero (Andalusia)

31 October 2019 11	Eibar	2–1	Villarreal	Eibar
19:00 CET (UTC+01:00)	Kike 62'; Orellana 90+5'	Report	Anguissa (yellow card) 15'; Iborra (yellow card) 74'; Quintillà (yellow card) 79'; Moreno 88'	Stadium: Ipurua; Attendance: 5,583; Referee: Guillermo Cuadra Fernández (Balearic Islands)

3 November 2019 12	Leganés	1–2	Eibar	Leganés
18:30 CET (UTC+01:00)	En-Nesyri 6'; Silva (yellow card) 14'; Braithwaite (yellow card) 65'; Recio (yellow card) 72'; Arnaiz (yellow card) 90+1'; Rivera (yellow card) 90+1'	Report	Kike (yellow card) 5', (goal) 84'; Charles (yellow card) 14', (goal) 17'	Stadium: Butarque; Attendance: 9,648; Referee: González Fuertes (Asturias)

9 November 2019 13	Eibar	0–4	Real Madrid	Eibar
18:30 CET (UTC+01:00)		Report	Benzema 17', 29' (pen.); Ramos 20' (pen.); Valverde 61'	Stadium: Ipurua; Attendance: 7,045; Referee: Cordero Vega (Cántabria)

24 November 2019 14	Eibar	0–2	Alavés	Eibar
16:00 CET (UTC+01:00)	Arbilla (yellow card) 88'	Report	Navarro (yellow card) 37'; Wakaso (yellow card) 80'; Joselu 85', 90+1'	Stadium: Ipurua; Attendance: 6,315; Referee: Mateu Lahoz (Valencian Community)

30 November 2019 15	Real Sociedad	4–1	Eibar	San Sebastián
16:00 CET (UTC+01:00)	Le Normand 25'; Zaldúa (yellow card) 41'; Oyarzabal 47'; Willian José 57'; Ødegaard 80'	Report	Ramis (yellow card) 24'; P. Diop 35', (yellow card) 45+3'; Oliveira (yellow card) 72'; Escalante (yellow card) 76'	Stadium: Anoeta; Attendance: 28,612; Referee: Del Cerro Grande (Community of Madrid)

8 December 2019 16	Eibar	0–1	Getafe	Eibar
12:00 CET (UTC+01:00)	P. Diop (yellow card) 17'; Oliveira (yellow card) 36'; Orellana (yellow card) 43', (red card) 90+7'; Enrich (yellow card) 75'; Escalante (yellow card) 88'	Report	Duro (yellow card) 57'; Ángel 67'	Stadium: Ipurua; Attendance: 5,969; Referee: Prieto Iglesias (Navarre)

14 December 2019 17	Athletic Bilbao	0–0	Eibar	Bilbao
18:30 CET (UTC+01:00)	R. García (yellow card) 55'; San José (yellow card) 90'; Capa (yellow card) 90+2'	Report	Kike (yellow card) 86'; Dmitrović (yellow card) 88'; Á. Tejero (yellow card) 90+4'	Stadium: San Mamés; Attendance: 43,203; Referee: Melero López (Andalusia)

20 December 2019 18	Eibar	3–0	Granada	Eibar
21:00 CET (UTC+01:00)	Enrich 21', (yellow card) 45'; Kike 26'; Escalante (yellow card) 55'; León (yellow card) 77'; Inui 87'	Report	Gonalons (yellow card) 17'; Duarte (yellow card) 56'; Eteki (yellow card) 80'	Stadium: Ipurua; Attendance: 5,341; Referee: González Fuertes (Asturias)

4 January 2020 19	Valencia	1–0	Eibar	Valencia
13:00 CET (UTC+01:00)	Gómez 27'; Wass (yellow card) 77'	Report	Charles (yellow card) 62'; Oliveira (yellow card) 84' (yellow-red card) 90+1'	Stadium: Mestalla; Attendance: 39,702; Referee: Hernández Hernández (Las Palmas)

18 January 2020 20	Eibar	2–0	Atlético Madrid	Eibar
21:00 CET (UTC+01:00)	Burgos 10', (yellow card) 62'; Expósito 90'	Report	Saúl (yellow card) 59'; Savić (yellow card) 85'	Stadium: Ipurua; Attendance: 6,429; Referee: Gil Manzano (Extremadura)

26 January 2020 21	Celta Vigo	0–0	Eibar	Vigo
14:00 CET (UTC+01:00)	Aspas (yellow card) 63'	Report		Stadium: Abanca-Balaídos; Attendance: 15,490; Referee: González González (Castile and Léon)

2 February 2020 22	Eibar	1–1	Real Betis	Eibar
14:00 CET (UTC+01:00)	Orellana 15' (pen.), (yellow card) 18'; E. Burgos (yellow card) 33'	Report	Fekir 7'; González (yellow card) 14'; Sidnei (yellow card) 27'	Stadium: Ipurua; Attendance: 6,558; Referee: Juan Martínez Munuera (Valencian Community)

7 February 2020 23	Alavés	2–1	Eibar	Vitoria-Gasteiz
21:00 CET (UTC+01:00)	Vidal (yellow card) 35'; Pérez 46'; Burke 66'; Navarro (yellow card) 74'; García (yellow card) 85'	Report	León (yellow card) 53'; Orellana 83'; Charles (yellow card) 90+1'	Stadium: Mendizorrotza; Attendance: 17,089; Referee: Prieto Iglesias (Navarre)

22 February 2020 25	Barcelona	5–0	Eibar	Barcelona
16:00 CET (UTC+01:00)	Messi 14', 37', 40', 87'; Arthur 89'	Report	Escalante (yellow card) 64'; Diop (yellow card) 85'	Stadium: Camp Nou; Attendance: 66,970; Referee: César Soto Grado

29 February 2020 26	Eibar	3–0	Levante	Eibar
13:00 CET (UTC+01:00)	Charles 27', 48'; Enrich (yellow card) 51'; Orellana (yellow card) 60', (goal) 84'; Cote (yellow card) 62'	Report	Miramón (yellow card) 71'; Postigo (yellow card) 72'	Stadium: Ipurua; Attendance: 5,920; Referee: González Fuertes (Asturias)

7 March 2020 27	Eibar	1–2	Mallorca	Eibar
13:00 CET (UTC+01:00)	Oliveira (yellow card) 40'; Cote (yellow card) 72'; Charles (yellow card) 86'; Bigas 90+2'; Enrich (yellow card) 90+3'; Yoel (yellow card) 90+4'	Report	Valjent (yellow card) 23'; Rodríguez 42', (yellow card) 66'; Kubo 78'; Reina (yellow card) 90+3'	Stadium: Ipurua; Attendance: 6,110; Referee: Estrada Fernández (Catalunya)

10 March 2020 24	Eibar	1–2	Real Sociedad	Eibar
20:00 CET (UTC+01:00)	Bigas (yellow card) 15'; Cote (yellow card) 29'; Escalante (yellow card) 35'; Charles 90' (pen.)	Report	Oyarzabal 16' (pen.); Zubeldia (yellow card) 28'; Januzaj (yellow card) 37'; Willian José 75'	Stadium: Ipurua; Attendance: 0 Referee: Medié Jiménez (Catalunya)
Note: Match originally scheduled for 16 February, but postponed due to air contamination, and rearranged for 10 March 2020. This match was played behind closed doors due to the pandemic of COVID-19 in Spain.

14 June 2020 28	Real Madrid	3–1	Eibar	Madrid
19:30 CEST (UTC+02:00)	Kroos 4'; Ramos 30'; Marcelo 37'; Casemiro (yellow card) 47'	Report	Bigas 60'; Cristóforo (yellow card) 90+3'	Stadium: Alfredo di Stéfano; Attendance: 0 Referee: Guillermo Cuadra Fernández (Balearic Islands)
Note: The match was originally scheduled for 13 March, but was postponed due to the COVID-19 pandemic, and rescheduled to 14 June. It was played behind closed doors.

17 June 2020 29	Eibar	2–2	Athletic Bilbao	Eibar
19:30 CEST (UTC+02:00)	Escalante (yellow card) 8'; Kike 19'; León (yellow card) 54'; Orellana 78' (pen.); Correa (yellow card) 83'	Report	R. García 8' (pen.); D. García (yellow card) 77'; Villalibre 81'; Vesga (yellow card) 90+7'	Stadium: Ipurua; Attendance: 0 Referee: Prieto Iglesias (Navarre)
Note: The match was originally scheduled for 21 March, but was postponed due to the 2020 coronavirus pandemic, and rescheduled to 17 June. It was played behind closed doors.

20 June 2020 30	Getafe	1–1	Eibar	Getafe
19:30 CEST (UTC+02:00)	Etebo 30'; Djené (yellow card) 45+4'; Etxeita (yellow card) 85'; Nyom (yellow card) 90'	Report	Charles 45+6'	Stadium: Coliseum Alfonso Pérez; Attendance: 0 Referee: Alberola Rojas (Castille-La Mancha)
Note: The match was originally scheduled for 5 April, but was postponed due to the 2020 coronavirus pandemic, and rescheduled to 20 June. It was played behind closed doors.

25 June 2020 31	Eibar	1–0	Valencia	Eibar
19:30 CEST (UTC+02:00)	Kondogbia 16' (o.g.); Escalante (yellow card) 26'; Charles (yellow card) 74'; Enrich (yellow card) 81'; Orellana (yellow card) 83'	Report	Mangala (yellow card) 59' (yellow-red card) 89'	Stadium: Ipurua; Attendance: 0 Referee: Jaime Latre (Aragon)
Note: The match was originally scheduled for 12 April, but was postponed due to the 2020 coronavirus pandemic, and rescheduled to 25 June. It was played behind closed doors.

28 June 2020 32	Granada	1–2	Eibar	Granada
19:30 CEST (UTC+02:00)	Soldado 48'; Germán (yellow card) 90+4'	Report	De Blasis 16'; Kike 69'	Stadium: Los Cármenes; Attendance: 0 Referee: Del Cerro Grande (Community of Madrid)
Note: The match was originally scheduled for 22 April, but was postponed due to the 2020 coronavirus pandemic, and rescheduled to 28 June. It was played behind closed doors.

2 July 2020 33	Eibar	0–2	Osasuna	Eibar
19:30 CEST (UTC+02:00)	Rober (yellow card) 4'	Report	R. García 6', 74'; Gallego (yellow card) 45+1'	Stadium: Ipurua; Attendance: 0 Referee: José Luis Munuera Montero (Andalusia)
Note: The match was originally scheduled for 26 April, but was postponed due to the 2020 coronavirus pandemic, and rescheduled to 2 July. It was played behind closed doors.

6 July 2020 34	Sevilla	1–0	Eibar	Sevilla
22:00 CEST (UTC+02:00)	Gómez (yellow card) 14'; Ocampos 56'; Banega (yellow card) 90+1'	Report	Álvarez (yellow card) 37'	Stadium: Ramón Sánchez Pizjuán; Attendance: 0 Referee: Mateu Lahoz (Valencian Community)
Note: The match was originally scheduled for 3 May, but was postponed due to the 2020 coronavirus pandemic, and rescheduled to 6 July. It was played behind closed doors.

9 July 2020 35	Eibar	0–0	Leganés	Eibar
19:30 CEST (UTC+02:00)	P. Diop (yellow card) 46'; Rober (yellow card) 55'; Charles (yellow card) 73'	Report	Bustinza (yellow card) 17'; Siovas (yellow card) 53'; Cuéllar (yellow card) 89'	Stadium: Ipurua; Attendance: 0 Referee: Prieto Iglesias (Navarre)
Note: The match was originally scheduled for 10 May, but was postponed due to the 2020 coronavirus pandemic, and rescheduled to 9 July. It was played behind closed doors.

12 July 2020 36	Espanyol	0–2	Eibar	Cornellà de Llobregat
14:00 CEST (UTC+02:00)	Vilà (yellow card) 52'; Roca (yellow card) 58'	Report	Expósito 25' (pen.), 36'; Tejero (yellow card) 65'; Enrich (yellow card) 76'	Stadium: RCDE Stadium; Attendance: 0 Referee: Del Cerro Grande (Community of Madrid)
Note: The match was originally scheduled for 13 May, but was postponed due to the 2020 coronavirus pandemic, and rescheduled to 12 July. It was played behind closed doors.

16 July 2020 37	Eibar	3–1	Valladolid	Eibar
18:30 CEST (UTC+02:00)	Rafa (yellow card) 17'; Bigas 21'; Álvarez (yellow card) 24'; Inui 28'; Burgos (yellow card) 68'; De Blasis 90+2' (pen.), (yellow card) 90+4'	Report	Guardiola 71'	Stadium: Ipurua; Attendance: 0 Referee: César Soto Grado
Note: The match was originally scheduled for 17 May, but was postponed due to the 2020 coronavirus pandemic, and rescheduled to 16 July. It was played behind closed doors.

19 July 2020 38	Villarreal	4–0	Eibar	Vilarreal
18:30 CEST (UTC+02:00)	Zambo Anguissa 71'; Gerard 86', 89'; Gómez 90+4'	Report		Stadium: Estadio de la Cerámica; Attendance: 0 Referee: Alberola Rojas (Castille-La Mancha)
Note: The match was originally scheduled for 24 May, but was postponed due to the 2020 coronavirus pandemic, and rescheduled to 19 July. It was played behind closed doors.

=== Copa del Rey ===
17 December 2019 First round	SD Logroñés	0–5	Eibar	Logroño
19:00 CET (UTC+01:00)	Santolaya (yellow card) 14'; Ledó (yellow card) 90'	Report	Senar (yellow card) 51'; De Blasis 57', 62', 70'; Charles 83', 87'	Stadium: Las Gaunas; Attendance: 2,500; Referee: Estrada Fernández (Catalunya)

12 January 2020 Second round	Cacereño	1–2	Eibar	Cáceres
12:00 CET (UTC+01:00)	Torres 64'; Berraco (yellow card) 85'	Report	Oliveira (yellow card) 68'; León 79'; Delgado 90+3' (o.g.)	Stadium: Estadio Príncipe Felipe; Attendance: 6,196; Referee: González González (Castile and Léon)

23 January 2020 Round of 32	Badajoz	3–1	Eibar	Badajoz
21:00 CET (UTC+01:00)	Fobi 8'; Corredera 21' (pen.); Guzmán (yellow card) 28'; Vázquez 72'; Maestre (yellow card) 88'; Bikoro (yellow card) 90+1'	Report	Charles 29' (pen.); Rober (yellow card) 45+1'; Cristoforo (yellow card) 56'	Stadium: Nuevo Vivero; Attendance: 13,000; Referee: Del Cerro Grande (Community of Madrid)
