= 2023–24 SD Eibar season =

SD Eibar
2023–24 season
- President: Amaia Gorostiza
- Head coach: Joseba Etxeberria
- Stadium: Ipurua Municipal Stadium
- Segunda División: 3rd
- Copa del Rey: Round of 32
- Top goalscorer: League: Jon Bautista (17); All: Jon Bautista (17)

The 2023–24 season was SD Eibar's 83rd season in existence and second consecutive in the Segunda División, the second division of association football in Spain. They also competed in the Copa del Rey.

== Players ==
=== First-team squad ===
As of 13 September 2023

Note: Flags indicate national team as defined under FIFA eligibility rules; some limited exceptions apply. Players may hold more than one non-FIFA nationality.

| No. | Pos. | Nation | Player |
|---|---|---|---|
| 1 | GK | FRA | Luca Zidane |
| 2 | DF | ESP | Cristian Gutiérrez |
| 3 | DF | POR | Frederico Venâncio |
| 4 | DF | ESP | Rober Correa |
| 5 | DF | ESP | Juan Berrocal |
| 6 | MF | ESP | Sergio Álvarez |
| 7 | FW | ESP | Quique González |
| 8 | MF | BRA | Matheus Pereira |
| 9 | FW | MAR | Yacine Qasmi |
| 10 | MF | ESP | Ager Aketxe |
| 11 | MF | FRA | Yanis Rahmani |
| 12 | MF | VEN | Jorge Yriarte |

| No. | Pos. | Nation | Player |
|---|---|---|---|
| 13 | GK | ESP | Yoel Rodríguez |
| 14 | MF | ESP | Unai Vencedor (on loan from Athletic Bilbao) |
| 15 | DF | ESP | Álvaro Tejero |
| 17 | MF | ESP | José Corpas |
| 18 | FW | ESP | Jon Bautista |
| 19 | FW | ESP | Stoichkov |
| 21 | DF | ESP | Ríos Reina |
| 22 | DF | CZE | Stefan Simić |
| 23 | DF | ESP | Anaitz Arbilla (captain) |
| 27 | FW | USA | Konrad de la Fuente (on loan from Marseille) |
| 30 | MF | ESP | Mario Soriano (on loan from Deportivo La Coruña) |
| 31 | MF | ESP | Ángel Troncho |

=== Reserve team ===
Note: Flags indicate national team as defined under FIFA eligibility rules; some limited exceptions apply. Players may hold more than one non-FIFA nationality.

| No. | Pos. | Nation | Player |
|---|---|---|---|
| 29 | MF | ESP | Ander Madariaga |
| 32 | DF | ESP | Aritz Muguruza |

=== Out on loan ===
Note: Flags indicate national team as defined under FIFA eligibility rules; some limited exceptions apply. Players may hold more than one non-FIFA nationality.

| No. | Pos. | Nation | Player |
|---|---|---|---|
| — | DF | ESP | Sergio Cubero (at Racing Ferrol until 30 June 2024) |
| — | FW | ESP | Juan Carlos Arana (at Racing Santander until 30 June 2024) |

== Transfers ==
=== In ===
| Pos. | Player | Transferred from | Fee | Date | Source |
|---|---|---|---|---|---|
| MF | (Spain) Unai Vencedor | (Spain) Athletic Bilbao | Loan | 5 August 2023 | |
| DF | (Spain) Cristian Gutiérrez | (Spain) Málaga | Free | 7 August 2023 | |
| FW | (Morocco) Yacine Qasmi | (Spain) Leganés | Free | 12 September 2023 | |
| DF | (Czech Republic) Stefan Simić | (Croatia) Hajduk Split | Free | 12 September 2023 | |

=== Out ===
| Pos. | Player | Transferred to | Fee | Date | Source |
|---|---|---|---|---|---|
| MF | (Spain) Óscar Sielva | (Spain) Huesca | €200,000 | 1 July 2023 | |
| CF | (Argentina) Gustavo Blanco Leschuk | (Iran) Esteghlal | Free | 30 August 2023 | |

== Pre-season and friendlies ==
Win Draw Loss Fixtures

| 3 August 2023 Friendly | Athletic Bilbao | 1–1 | Eibar | Sestao |
| 19:30 UTC+2 | Martón 20'; Herrera (yellow card) 55' | Report | Soriano 35'; Matheus (yellow card) 58'; Rober (yellow card) 73' | Stadium: Campo Municipal de Las Llanas; Referee: Pablo González Fuertes |

| 5 August 2023 Friendly | Racing Santander | 0–0 | Eibar | Galizano |
| 11:30 UTC+2 | | | Muguruza 85' | Stadium: Baceñuela; Attendance: 800; Referee: López Parra |

| 15 August 2023 Friendly | Numancia | 1–3 | Eibar | Soria |
| 18:30 UTC+2 | Primo 29' | | Feuillassier 45'; Arana 75', 80' | Stadium: Los Pajaritos; Attendance: 1,158; Referee: Iosu Galech Apezteguía |

== Competitions ==
=== Overall record ===
| Competition | First match | Last match | Starting round | Final position | Record | | | | | | | |
| Competition | First match | Last match | Starting round | Final position | Pld | W | D | L | GF | GA | GD | Win % |
|---|---|---|---|---|---|---|---|---|---|---|---|---|
| Segunda División | 12 August 2023 | 2 June 2024 | Matchday 1 | 3rd | 42 | 21 | 8 | 13 | 72 | 48 | +24 | 50.00 |
| Copa del Rey | 31 October 2023 | 7 January 2024 | First round | Round of 32 | 3 | 1 | 1 | 1 | 5 | 4 | +1 | 33.33 |
| Total | | | | | 45 | 22 | 9 | 14 | 77 | 52 | +25 | 48.89 |

Last updated: 2 June 2024
Source: Soccerway

=== Segunda División ===
==== League table ====
| Pos | Team | Pld | W | D | L | GF | GA | GD | Pts | Qualification or relegation |
|---|---|---|---|---|---|---|---|---|---|---|
| 1 | Leganés (C, P) | 42 | 20 | 14 | 8 | 56 | 27 | +29 | 74 | Promotion to La Liga |
| 2 | Valladolid (P) | 42 | 21 | 9 | 12 | 51 | 36 | +15 | 72 | Promotion to La Liga |
| 3 | Eibar | 42 | 21 | 8 | 13 | 72 | 48 | +24 | 71 | Qualification for promotion play-offs |
| 4 | Espanyol (O, P) | 42 | 17 | 18 | 7 | 59 | 40 | +19 | 69 | Qualification for promotion play-offs |
| 5 | Sporting Gijón | 42 | 18 | 11 | 13 | 51 | 42 | +9 | 65 | Qualification for promotion play-offs |

Updated to match(es) played on 2 Jun 2024. Source: LaLiga HyperMotion
Rules for classification: 1) Points; 2) Head-to-head points; 3) Head-to-head goal difference; 4) Goal difference; 5) Goals scored; 6) Fair-play points
(Note: Head-to-head record is used only after all the matches between the teams in question have been played)
(C) Champions; (O) Play-off winners; (P) Promoted

==== Results summary ====
| Overall | | | | | | | | Home | | | | | | Away | | | | | |
| Pld | W | D | L | GF | GA | GD | Pts | W | D | L | GF | GA | GD | W | D | L | GF | GA | GD |
|---|---|---|---|---|---|---|---|---|---|---|---|---|---|---|---|---|---|---|---|
| 42 | 21 | 8 | 13 | 72 | 48 | +24 | 71 | 14 | 4 | 3 | 45 | 17 | +28 | 7 | 4 | 10 | 27 | 31 | −4 |

Source: LALIGA HYPERMOTION

==== Results by round ====
| Round | 1 | 2 | 3 | 4 | 5 | 6 | 7 | 8 | 9 | 10 | 11 | 12 | 13 | 14 | 15 | 16 | 17 | 18 | 19 | 20 | 21 | 22 | 23 | 24 | 25 | 26 | 27 | 28 | 29 | 30 | 31 | 32 | 33 | 34 | 35 | 36 | 37 | 38 | 39 | 40 | 41 | 42 |
|---|---|---|---|---|---|---|---|---|---|---|---|---|---|---|---|---|---|---|---|---|---|---|---|---|---|---|---|---|---|---|---|---|---|---|---|---|---|---|---|---|---|---|
| Ground | A | H | A | H | A | H | A | H | A | A | H | A | H | A | H | A | H | A | H | A | H | H | A | H | A | H | A | H | A | H | H | A | H | A | A | H | A | H | A | H | A | H |
| Result | L | W | L | L | L | W | W | W | W | W | D | W | W | D | D | L | W | L | D | L | D | W | W | W | D | W | D | L | W | L | W | L | W | L | W | W | L | W | D | W | L | W |
| Position | 21 | 14 | 17 | 21 | 22 | 17 | 12 | 9 | 8 | 7 | 6 | 5 | 2 | 3 | 4 | 5 | 5 | 6 | 5 | 6 | 7 | 5 | 4 | 2 | 2 | 2 | 2 | 3 | 2 | 4 | 4 | 4 | 2 | 3 | 2 | 2 | 3 | 3 | 3 | 3 | 3 | 3 |

Source: LALIGA HYPERMOTION
A = Away; H = Home; W = Win; D = Draw; L = Loss

==== Matches ====
The league fixtures were unveiled on 28 June 2023.

| 12 August 2023 1 | Racing Santander | 4–0 | Eibar | Santander |
| 19:00 CEST (UTC+2) | Vicente 22'; Aldasoro 24'; Fernández 38' (pen.); Sánchez (yellow card) 66'; Junior 72'; Mantilla (yellow card) 88' | Report | Tejero (yellow card) 4'; Arbilla (yellow card) 21'; Berrocal (yellow card) 36' | Stadium: Campos de Sport de El Sardinero; Attendance: 13,914; Referee: Iván Caparrós Hernández |

| 19 August 2023 2 | Eibar | 2–1 | Elche | Eibar |
| 17:00 CEST (UTC+2) | Aketxe 5'; Soriano 77'; Bautista (yellow card) 83' | Report | Bigas (yellow card) 50'; Boyé 66' (pen.), (yellow card) 68' | Stadium: Ipurua Municipal Stadium; Attendance: 2,938; Referee: Óliver de la Fuente Ramos |

| 28 August 2023 3 | Eldense | 2–1 | Eibar | Elda |
| 19:00 CEST (UTC+2) | J. Ortuño 29'; Andone 39'; Sebastián (yellow card) 66' | Report | Venâncio (yellow card) 59'; Gutiérrez (yellow card) 65'; Rahmani (yellow card) 67'; Vencedor (yellow card) 83'; Aketxe 89' | Stadium: Nuevo Pepico Amat; Attendance: 4,356; Referee: Miguel González Díaz |

| 3 September 2023 4 | Eibar | 0–1 | Leganés | Eibar |
| 16:15 CEST (UTC+2) | Pereira (yellow card) 28'; Berrocal (yellow card) 87' | Report | Perea (yellow card) 32'; Chicco 33', (yellow card) 42'; Cissé (yellow card) 50' | Stadium: Ipurua Municipal Stadium; Attendance: 4,916; Referee: Daniel Jesús Trujillo Suárez |

| 9 September 2023 5 | Burgos | 1–0 | Eibar | Burgos |
| 16:15 CEST (UTC+2) | Sánchez 65' (pen.) | Report | | Stadium: El Plantío; Attendance: 8,553; Referee: Rafael Sánchez López |

| 17 September 2023 6 | Eibar | 2–0 | Racing Ferrol | Eibar |
| 16:15 CEST (UTC+2) | Stoichkov 25'; Arbilla 63' | Report | | Stadium: Ipurua Municipal Stadium; Attendance: 4,722; Referee: Manuel Jesús Orellana Cid |

| 22 September 2023 7 | Cartagena | 1–2 | Eibar | Cartagena |
| 21:00 CEST (UTC+2) | Real 47'; Izquierdo (red card) 57'; Muñoz (yellow card) 58'; Embaló (yellow card) 86' | Report | Cédric 24'; Stoichkov (yellow card) 27', (goal) 65'; Álvarez (yellow card) 56'; Soriano (yellow card) 71'; Corpas (yellow card) 73'; Vencedor (yellow card) 89' | Stadium: Cartagonova; Referee: Alejandro Quintero González |

| 30 September 2023 8 | Eibar | 3–0 | Tenerife | Eibar |
| 16:15 CEST (UTC+2) | Stoichkov 59'; González 66', (yellow card) 66'; Corpas (yellow card) 71'; Qasmi (yellow card) 89'; Vencedor 90+1' | Report | Amo (yellow card) 48' | Stadium: Ipurua Municipal Stadium; Attendance: 4,754; Referee: José Luis Guzmán Mansilla |

| 5 October 2023 9 | Mirandés | 1–3 | Eibar | Miranda de Ebro |
| 19:00 CEST (UTC+2) | Martínez 39' | Report | Bautista 31', 55'; Vencedor 49' | Stadium: Estadio Municipal de Anduva; Attendance: 3,249; Referee: Andrés Fuentes Molina |

| 8 October 2023 10 | Amorebieta | 1–2 | Eibar | Lezama |
| 14:00 CEST (UTC+2) | Dorrio 8' | Report | Rahmani 12'; Aketxe 90+2' | Stadium: Instalaciones de Lezama Campo 2 Attendance: 2,331; Referee: Raúl Martín González Francés |

| 15 October 2023 11 | Eibar | 1–1 | Huesca | Eibar |
| 18:30 CEST (UTC+2) | Pulido 71' (o.g.) | Report | Corpas 38' (o.g.) | Stadium: Ipurua Municipal Stadium; Attendance: 5,438; Referee: Daniel Jesús Trujillo Suárez |

| 21 October 2023 12 | Zaragoza | 2–3 | Eibar | Zaragoza |
| 21:00 CEST (UTC+2) | Mesa 39'; Grau 44' | Report | Bautista 62'; Stoichkov 67'; Aketxe 87' | Stadium: La Romareda; Attendance: 24,056; Referee: Óliver de la Fuente Ramos |

| 27 October 2023 13 | Eibar | 5–1 | Valladolid | Eibar |
| 21:00 CEST (UTC+2) | Aketxe 22'; Bautista 32'; Stoichkov 69'; Qasmi 84'; Rahmani 90+7' | Report | Sylla 48' | Stadium: Ipurua Municipal Stadium; Attendance: 5,690; Referee: Dámaso Arcediano Monescillo |

| 3 November 2023 14 | Espanyol | 2–2 | Eibar | Cornellà de Llobregat |
| 21:00 CET (UTC+1) | Puado 45+2', 56' (pen.) | Report | Bautista 6'; Puado 90+8' (o.g.) | Stadium: Stage Front Stadium; Attendance: 18,096; Referee: José Antonio López Toca |

| 12 November 2023 15 | Eibar | 1–1 | Albacete | Eibar |
| 21:00 CET (UTC+1) | Soriano 11' | Report | Medina 67' | Stadium: Ipurua Municipal Stadium; Attendance: 4,543; Referee: Saúl Ais Reig |

| 19 November 2023 16 | Oviedo | 2–1 | Eibar | Oviedo |
| 16:15 CET (UTC+1) | Bastón 49'; Colombatto 89' (pen.) | Report | Bautista 42' | Stadium: Estadio Carlos Tartiere; Attendance: 15,875; Referee: Raúl Martín González Francés |

| 25 November 2023 17 | Eibar | 3–1 | Levante | Eibar |
| 21:00 CET (UTC+1) | Corpas 45+5' (pen.); Stoichkov 53'; Bautista 73' | Report | Gómez 32' | Stadium: Ipurua Municipal Stadium; Attendance: 5,153; Referee: Adrián Cordero Vega |

| 4 December 2023 18 | Villarreal B | 1–0 | Eibar | Villarreal |
| 20:30 CET (UTC+1) | Forés 90+2' | Report | | Stadium: Estadio de la Cerámica; Attendance: 1,549; Referee: Miguel Sesma Espinosa |

| 10 December 2023 19 | Eibar | 2–2 | Andorra | Eibar |
| 18:30 CET (UTC+1) | Stoichkov 23'; Samper 36' (o.g.) | Report | Benito 5'; Nieto 82' (pen.) | Stadium: Ipurua Municipal Stadium; Attendance: 5,493; Referee: Andrés Fuentes Molina |

| 17 December 2023 20 | Alcorcón | 1–0 | Eibar | Alcorcón |
| 14:00 CET (UTC+1) | Chiki 8' | Report | | Stadium: Estadio Municipal de Santo Domingo; Attendance: 2,782; Referee: Daniel Jesús Trujillo Suárez |

| 20 December 2023 21 | Eibar | 1–1 | Sporting Gijón | Eibar |
| 21:30 CET (UTC+1) | Aketxe 66' (pen.) | Report | Campuzano 22' | Stadium: Ipurua Municipal Stadium; Attendance: 4,054; Referee: Rafael Sánchez López |

| 12 January 2024 22 | Eibar | 2–0 | Racing Santander | Eibar |
| 20:30 CET (UTC+1) | Stoichkov 10'; Aketxe 83' (pen.) | Report | | Stadium: Ipurua Municipal Stadium; Attendance: 5,886; Referee: Alejandro Quintero González |

| 21 January 2024 23 | Huesca | 2–3 | Eibar | Huesca |
| 18:30 CET (UTC+1) | Vallejo 46'; Hashimoto 65' | Report | Berrocal 37'; Soriano 42'; Stoichkov 71' | Stadium: Estadio El Alcoraz; Attendance: 5,011; Referee: Saúl Ais Reig |

| 26 January 2024 24 | Eibar | 1–0 | Mirandés | Eibar |
| 20:30 CET (UTC+1) | León 77' | Report | | Stadium: Ipurua Municipal Stadium; Attendance: 5,698; Referee: Salvador Lax Franco |

| 4 February 2024 25 | Racing Ferrol | 1–1 | Eibar | Ferrol |
| 14:00 CET (UTC+1) | Merino 90+4' (pen.) | Report | Bautista 53' | Stadium: Estadio Municipal de A Malata; Attendance: 7,472; Referee: Luis Mario Milla Alvendiz |

| 11 February 2024 26 | Eibar | 1–0 | Zaragoza | Eibar |
| 18:30 CET (UTC+1) | Bautista 7' | Report | | Stadium: Ipurua Municipal Stadium; Attendance: 6,265; Referee: Daniel Jesús Trujillo Suárez |

| 18 February 2024 27 | Elche | 0–0 | Eibar | Elche |
| 21:00 CET (UTC+1) | | Report | | Stadium: Estadio Martínez Valero; Attendance: 13,643; Referee: José Luis Guzmán Mansilla |

| 24 February 2024 28 | Eibar | 2–3 | Espanyol | Eibar |
| 18:30 CET (UTC+1) | Bautista 39'; Nolaskoain 65' | Report | Braithwaite 77' (pen.); Salvi 90+6'; Lazo 90+9' | Stadium: Ipurua Municipal Stadium; Attendance: 6,194; Referee: Alejandro Quintero González |

| 3 March 2024 29 | Leganés | 0–2 | Eibar | Leganés |
| 21:00 CET (UTC+1) | | Report | Nolaskoain 11'; Bautista 33' | Stadium: Estadio Municipal Butarque; Attendance: 9,015; Referee: Dámaso Arcediano Monescillo |

| 10 March 2024 30 | Eibar | 0–1 | Burgos | Eibar |
| 18:30 CET (UTC+1) | | Report | Nolaskoain 82' (o.g.) | Stadium: Ipurua Municipal Stadium; Attendance: 6,425; Referee: Miguel Sesma Espinosa |

| 16 March 2024 31 | Eibar | 2–0 | Villarreal B | Eibar |
| 16:15 CET (UTC+1) | León 37'; Corpas 73' (pen.) | Report | | Stadium: Ipurua Municipal Stadium; Attendance: 5,318; Referee: Álvaro Moreno Aragón |

| 24 March 2024 32 | Valladolid | 3–1 | Eibar | Valladolid |
| 16:15 CET (UTC+1) | Meseguer 57'; Sylla 60'; Salazar 69' | Report | Bautista 2' | Stadium: Estadio José Zorrilla; Attendance: 20,286; Referee: Salvador Lax Franco |

| 30 March 2024 33 | Eibar | 5–1 | Eldense | Eibar |
| 16:15 CET (UTC+1) | Aketxe 8' (pen.); Álvarez 72'; Konrad 79', 85'; Matheus 86' | Report | Chapela 90+1' | Stadium: Ipurua Municipal Stadium; Attendance: 4,113; Referee: Germán Cid Camacho |

| 7 April 2024 34 | Tenerife | 2–1 | Eibar | Santa Cruz de Tenerife |
| 18:30 WEST (UTC+1) | López 11'; Ángel 87' | Report | Corpas 42' | Stadium: Estadio Heliodoro Rodríguez López; Attendance: 15,081; Referee: Alejandro Quintero González |

| 14 April 2024 35 | Andorra | 0–2 | Eibar | Andorra la Vella |
| 16:15 CEST (UTC+2) | | Report | Bautista 52', 72' | Stadium: Estadi Nacional d'Andorra; Attendance: 2,463; Referee: Andrés Fuentes Molina |

| 21 April 2024 36 | Eibar | 2–0 | Alcorcón | Eibar |
| 16:15 CEST (UTC+2) | Bautista 45+2'; Corpas 89' (pen.) | Report | | Stadium: Ipurua Municipal Stadium; Attendance: 6,184; Referee: José Luis Guzmán Mansilla |

| 28 April 2024 37 | Albacete | 2–1 | Eibar | Albacete |
| 21:00 CEST (UTC+2) | Quiles 23'; Olaetxea 60' | Report | Bautista 43' | Stadium: Estadio Carlos Belmonte; Attendance: 11,033; Referee: Miguel Sesma Espinosa |

| 5 May 2024 38 | Eibar | 5–0 | Amorebieta | Eibar |
| 14:00 CEST (UTC+2) | Stoichkov 10'; Aketxe 45+3' (pen.); Corpas 49'; Bautista 79'; Konrad 82' | Report | | Stadium: Ipurua Municipal Stadium; Attendance: 6,248; Referee: Rubén Ávalos Barrera |

| 11 May 2024 39 | Levante | 2–2 | Eibar | Valencia |
| 21:00 CEST (UTC+2) | de la Fuente 11' (pen.); Bouldini 90' | Report | Tejero 31', 61' | Stadium: Estadi Ciutat de València; Attendance: 15,651; Referee: Dámaso Arcediano Monescillo |

| 19 May 2024 40 | Eibar | 1–0 | Cartagena | Eibar |
| 14:00 CEST (UTC+2) | Stoichkov 10' | Report | | Stadium: Ipurua Municipal Stadium; Attendance: 6,246; Referee: José Antonio López Toca |

| 26 May 2024 41 | Sporting Gijón | 1–0 | Eibar | Gijón |
| 18:30 CEST (UTC+2) | Campuzano 84' | Report | | Stadium: El Molinón; Attendance: 24,816; Referee: Álvaro Moreno Aragón |

| 2 June 2024 42 | Eibar | 4–3 | Oviedo | Eibar |
| 18:30 CEST (UTC+2) | Aketxe 25' (pen.); León 39'; Corpas 83'; Stoichkov 90' | Report | Sánchez 5'; Bastón 81', 90+7' | Stadium: Ipurua Municipal Stadium; Attendance: 7,588; Referee: José Luis Guzmán Mansilla |

==== Promotion play-offs ====
| 8 June 2024 Semi-finals; First leg | Oviedo | 0–0 | Eibar | Oviedo |
| 18:30 CEST (UTC+2) | | Report | | Stadium: Estadio Carlos Tartiere; Attendance: 28,100; Referee: Alejandro Quintero González |

| 12 June 2024 Semi-finals; Second leg | Eibar | 0–2 (0–2 agg.) | Oviedo | Eibar |
| 21:00 CEST (UTC+2) | | Report | Alemão 59'; Moyano 79' | Stadium: Ipurua Municipal Stadium; Attendance: 7,732; Referee: Iosu Galech Apezteguía |

=== Copa del Rey ===
| 31 October 2023 First round | Lorca Deportiva | 0–4 | Eibar | Lorca |
| 21:00 CET (UTC+1) | | Report | Troncho 68'; Konrad 80'; Aketxe 83', 90' (pen.) | Stadium: Estadio Francisco Artés Carrasco; Referee: Iván Caparrós Hernández |

| 7 December 2023 Second round | Melilla | 1–1 (a.e.t.) (1–4 p) | Eibar | Melilla |
| 20:00 CET (UTC+1) | Enrique 22' | Report | Quique 54' (pen.) | Stadium: Estadio Municipal Álvarez Claro; Referee: José Luis Guzmán Mansilla |
| | Penalties |
| | Caro (penalty missed); Yuste (penalty missed); García (penalty scored) | | (penalty scored) Corpas; (penalty scored) Quique; (penalty scored) Tejero; (penalty scored) Muguruza |

| 7 January 2024 Round of 32 | Eibar | 0–3 | Athletic Bilbao | Eibar |
| 19:00 CET (UTC+1) | | Report | Villalibre 17', 40'; Muniain 33' | Stadium: Ipurua Municipal Stadium; Referee: Alejandro Hernández Hernández |

== Statistics ==
=== Goalscorers ===
| Position | Players | Segunda División | Play-offs | Copa del Rey | Total |
|---|---|---|---|---|---|
| FW | (Spain) Jon Bautista | 17 | 0 | 0 | 17 |
| MF | (Spain) Ager Aketxe | 11 | 0 | 2 | 13 |
| MF | (Spain) Stoichkov | 12 | 0 | 0 | 12 |
| MF | (Spain) José Corpas | 6 | 0 | 0 | 6 |
| FW | (Spain) Sergio León | 5 | 0 | 0 | 5 |
| MF | (United States) Konrad de la Fuente | 3 | 0 | 1 | 4 |
