= Yoel Rodríguez =

Spanish footballer

Yoel
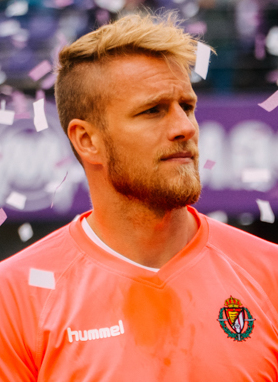
- Yoel with Valladolid in 2019

Personal information
- Full name: Yoel Rodríguez Oterino
- Date of birth: 28 August 1988 (age 38)
- Place of birth: Vigo, Spain
- Height: 1.86 m (6 ft 1 in)
- Position: Goalkeeper

Youth career
- Colegio Hogar
- 1999–2006: Celta

Senior career*
Years	Team	Apps	(Gls)
2006–2009	Celta B	66	(0)
2009–2015	Celta	77	(0)
2012–2013	→ Lugo (loan)	33	(0)
2014–2015	→ Valencia (loan)	2	(0)
2015–2017	Valencia	0	(0)
2015–2016	→ Rayo Vallecano (loan)	9	(0)
2016–2017	→ Eibar (loan)	25	(0)
2017–2024	Eibar	37	(0)
2018–2019	→ Valladolid (loan)	3	(0)
2024–2025	Racing Ferrol	6	(0)

International career
2006–2007	Spain U19	2	(0)
- * Club domestic league appearances and goals as of 25 June 2025

Yoel Rodríguez Oterino (born 28 August 1988), known simply as Yoel (Spanish pronunciation: [ɟʝoˈel]), is a Spanish professional footballer who plays as a goalkeeper.

He played 82 La Liga games for Celta, Valencia, Rayo Vallecano, Eibar and Valladolid, almost exclusively as back-up.

== Club career ==
=== Celta ===
Born in Vigo, Pontevedra, Galicia, Yoel was a product of local RC Celta de Vigo's youth academy. He was promoted to the first team for the 2009–10 season, with the team in the Segunda División. On 10 February 2010, following a string of good performances in that year's Copa del Rey, he was called up to the Spain under-21 side training camp by manager Juan Ramón López Caro.

Yoel was first choice in the 2011–12, playing 25 games in a return to La Liga after five years. For the following campaign, however, he was loaned to neighbouring CD Lugo also in the second tier.

Yoel returned to Celta for 2013–14, making his top-flight debut on 19 August in a 2–2 home draw against RCD Espanyol.

=== Valencia ===
On 31 July 2014, Yoel was loaned to Valencia CF for one year, with the club having an obligatory option to buy him permanently at the end of this period. He made his competitive debut on 19 October, starting in the 3–0 away loss against Deportivo de La Coruña.

On 19 November 2015, after making no appearances during the season despite injuries to both Diego Alves and Mathew Ryan, Yoel was loaned to Rayo Vallecano until June to make up for Toño's serious injury, with a buyout clause. On 20 December, he was in goal at the Santiago Bernabéu Stadium, but his team had to play with nine players for more than 60 minutes and were eventually crushed 10–2 by hosts Real Madrid.

=== Eibar ===
Yoel joined top-flight SD Eibar on 11 July 2016, on loan and again with an option to buy. On 23 May 2017, he agreed to a permanent deal for a reported €750,000.

In June 2017, Yoel suffered a knee ligament injury while exercising, ruling him out for six months. On 30 August 2018, having spent the remainder of the campaign as a backup to Marko Dmitrović, he renewed his contract until 2021 and was immediately loaned to Real Valladolid for one year. He spent most of that season on the bench behind Jordi Masip, and when chosen to play against Deportivo Alavés on 19 April 2019, he made errors in a 2–2 away draw.

In December 2020, having not recovered his position from the Serb, Yoel extended his link until June 2024. The following summer, as the former moved to Sevilla FC, Ander Cantero arrived as competition at the relegated Basque club.

Yoel continued to play second-fiddle until the end of his spell after Cantero's departure, now to Luca Zidane.

=== Racing Ferrol ===
On 2 July 2024, the free agent Yoel remained in the second tier by signing a one-year contract with Racing de Ferrol.

== Career statistics ==
As of match played 24 May 2025

Appearances and goals by club, season and competition
Club	Season	League			National cup		Europe		Other		Total	
Club	Season	Division	Apps	Goals	Apps	Goals	Apps	Goals	Apps	Goals	Apps	Goals
Celta B	2005–06	Segunda División B	8	0	—		—		—		8	0
Celta B	2006–07	Segunda División B	13	0	—		—		—		13	0
Celta B	2007–08	Segunda División B	9	0	—		—		—		9	0
Celta B	2008–09	Segunda División B	36	0	—		—		—		36	0
Celta B	Total		66	0	0	0	0	0	0	0	66	0
Celta	2008–09	Segunda División	0	0	0	0	—		—		0	0
Celta	2009–10	Segunda División	7	0	8	0	—		—		15	0
Celta	2010–11	Segunda División	9	0	1	0	—		2 (Note: Appearances in La Liga play-offs)	0	12	0
Celta	2011–12	Segunda División	26	0	0	0	—		—		26	0
Celta	2013–14	La Liga	35	0	0	0	—		—		35	0
Celta	Total		77	0	9	0	0	0	2	0	88	0
Lugo (loan)	2012–13	Segunda División	33	0	0	0	—		—		33	0
Valencia (loan)	2014–15	La Liga	2	0	4	0	—		—		6	0
Valencia	2015–16	La Liga	0	0	—		0	0	—		0	0
Rayo Vallecano (loan)	2015–16	La Liga	9	0	1	0	—		—		10	0
Eibar (loan)	2016–17	La Liga	25	0	5	0	—		—		30	0
Eibar	2017–18	La Liga	1	0	0	0	—		—		1	0
Eibar	2018–19	La Liga	0	0	—		—		—		12	0
Eibar	2019–20	La Liga	3	0	3	0	—		—		6	0
Eibar	2020–21	La Liga	4	0	3	0	—		—		7	0
Eibar	2021–22	Segunda División	18	0	0	0	—		0	0	12	0
Eibar	2022–23	Segunda División	11	0	1	0	—		0	0	12	0
Eibar	2023–24	Segunda División	0	0	3	0	—		0	0	3	0
Eibar	Total		37	0	10	0	0	0	0	0	47	0
Valladolid (loan)	2018–19	La Liga	3	0	4	0	—		—		7	0
Racing Ferrol	2024–25	Segunda División	6	0	3	0	—		—		9	0
UD Ourense	2025–26	Segunda Federación	0	0	—		—		0	0	0	0
Career total			258	0	36	0	0	0	2	0	296	0
