= Álvaro Tejero =

Spanish footballer (born 1996)

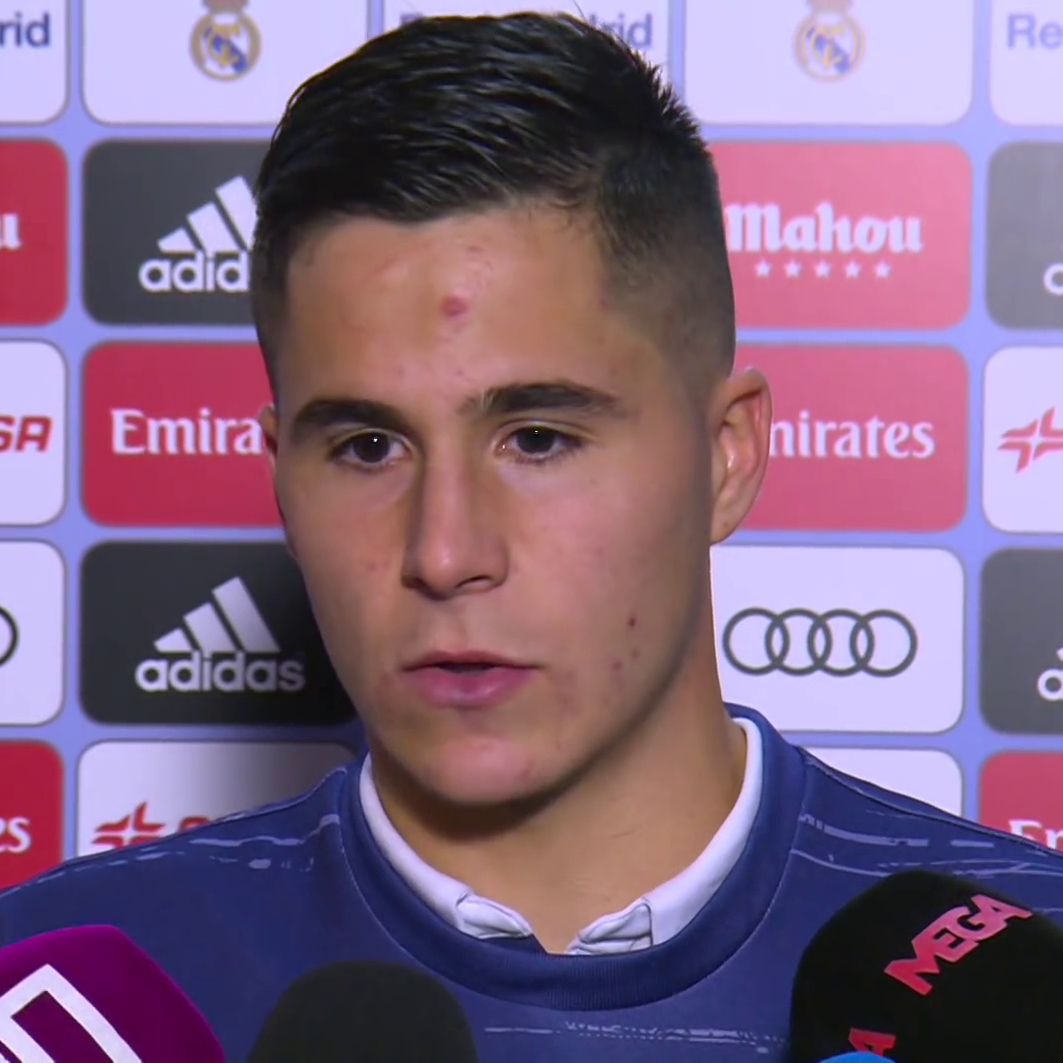
- Tejero with Real Madrid in 2016

Personal information
- Full name: Álvaro Tejero Sacristán
- Date of birth: 20 July 1996 (age 30)
- Place of birth: Madrid, Spain
- Height: 1.72 m (5 ft 8 in)
- Position: Full back

Team information
- Current team: Leganés

Youth career
- 2004–2005: Collado Villalba
- 2005–2015: Real Madrid

Senior career*
| Years | Team | Apps | (Gls) |
| 2015 | Real Madrid C | 3 | (0) |
| 2015–2018 | Real Madrid B | 102 | (2) |
| 2017–2019 | Real Madrid | 1 | (0) |
| 2018–2019 | → Albacete (loan) | 38 | (1) |
| 2019–2024 | Eibar | 130 | (7) |
| 2020–2021 | → Zaragoza (loan) | 22 | (2) |
| 2024–2025 | Espanyol | 28 | (1) |
| 2025–2026 | Aris | 30 | (0) |
| 2026– | Leganés | 0 | (0) |
- * Club domestic league appearances and goals as of 14 June 2026

Álvaro Tejero Sacristán (born 20 July 1996) is a Spanish professional footballer who plays as a full back for CD Leganés.

== Club career ==
Born in Madrid, Tejero joined Real Madrid's youth setup in 2005, after starting it out at CU Collado Villalba. After progressing through its youth setup, he made his senior debut with the C-team in 2015, in Tercera División.

On 5 July 2015, Tejero was promoted to the reserves in Segunda División B by manager Zinedine Zidane. He made his debut for the B-team on 22 August, starting in a 5–1 home routing of CD Ebro.

Tejero made his first team debut on 2 December 2015, coming on as a late substitute for Pepe in a 3–1 Copa del Rey away win against Cádiz CF. Having been the team's only ever-present and missing only 12 minutes of action all season, he scored his first goal for Castilla on 6 February 2016, the game's only against Real Unión at the Estadio Alfredo Di Stefano.

Tejero made his La Liga debut on 26 April 2017, replacing Raphaël Varane in a 6–2 home routing of Deportivo de La Coruña. On 10 July of the following year, he was loaned to Segunda División side Albacete Balompié for one year.

On 26 June 2019, Tejero signed a five-year contract with SD Eibar in the top tier. On 5 October of the following year, after featuring sparingly, he was loaned to Real Zaragoza for the 2020–21 campaign.

On 9 July 2024, free agent Tejero signed a one-year deal with RCD Espanyol, newly promoted to the main category. He terminated his link with the club on 14 July of the following year, and immediately joined Super League Greece side Aris Thessaloniki FC just hours later.

On 16 July 2026, Tejero returned to his home country after agreeing to a two-year contract with CD Leganés in the second division.

== Career statistics ==
=== Club ===
As of 27 February 2026

Appearances and goals by club, season and competition
| Club | Season | League | | | Cup | | Europe (Note: Includes UEFA Conference League) | | Total | |
| Club | Season | Division | Apps | Goals | Apps | Goals | Apps | Goals | Apps | Goals |
|---|---|---|---|---|---|---|---|---|---|---|
| Real Madrid B | 2015–16 | Segunda División B | 41 | 1 | — | | — | | 41 | 1 |
| Real Madrid B | 2016–17 | Segunda División B | 30 | 1 | — | | — | | 30 | 1 |
| Real Madrid B | 2017–18 | Segunda División B | 31 | 0 | — | | — | | 31 | 0 |
| Real Madrid B | Total | | 102 | 2 | — | | — | | 102 | 2 |
| Real Madrid | 2015–16 | La Liga | 0 | 0 | 1 | 0 | — | | 1 | 0 |
| Real Madrid | 2016–17 | La Liga | 1 | 0 | 1 | 0 | — | | 2 | 0 |
| Real Madrid | 2017–18 | La Liga | 0 | 0 | 2 | 0 | — | | 2 | 0 |
| Real Madrid | Total | | 1 | 0 | 4 | 0 | — | | 5 | 0 |
| Albacete (loan) | 2018–19 | Segunda División | 40 | 1 | 1 | 0 | — | | 41 | 1 |
| Eibar | 2019–20 | La Liga | 18 | 0 | 2 | 0 | — | | 20 | 0 |
| Eibar | 2020–21 | La Liga | 2 | 0 | 0 | 0 | — | | 2 | 0 |
| Eibar | 2021–22 | Segunda División | 35 | 3 | 1 | 0 | — | | 36 | 3 |
| Eibar | 2022–23 | Segunda División | 37 | 2 | 2 | 1 | — | | 39 | 3 |
| Eibar | 2023–24 | Segunda División | 38 | 2 | 2 | 0 | — | | 40 | 2 |
| Eibar | Total | | 130 | 7 | 7 | 1 | — | | 137 | 8 |
| Zaragoza (loan) | 2020–21 | Segunda División | 22 | 2 | 1 | 0 | — | | 23 | 2 |
| Espanyol | 2024–25 | La Liga | 28 | 1 | 1 | 0 | — | | 29 | 1 |
| Aris | 2025–26 | Super League Greece | 21 | 0 | 5 | 0 | 2 | 0 | 28 | 0 |
| Career total | | | 344 | 13 | 19 | 1 | 2 | 0 | 365 | 14 |
