= Frederico Venâncio =

Portuguese footballer

Personal information
- Full name: Frederico André Ferrão Venâncio
- Date of birth: 4 February 1993 (age 33)
- Place of birth: Gâmbia, Portugal
- Height: 1.86 m (6 ft 1 in)
- Position: Centre-back

Youth career
- 2002–2010: Vitória Setúbal
- 2010–2011: Benfica
- 2011–2012: Vitória Setúbal

Senior career*
Years	Team	Apps	(Gls)
2012–2018	Vitória Setúbal	115	(6)
2017–2018	→ Sheffield Wednesday (loan)	20	(1)
2018–2021	Vitória Guimarães	25	(0)
2020–2021	→ Lugo (loan)	36	(2)
2021–2024	Eibar	75	(1)
2024–2026	Santa Clara	48	(1)

International career
2012–2013	Portugal U20	8	(0)
2013–2014	Portugal U21	2	(0)
Medal record
Men's football
Representing Portugal
UEFA European Under-21 Championship
Runner-up	2015 Czech Republic
- * Club domestic league appearances and goals as of 17:25, 2 May 2026 (UTC)

Frederico André Ferrão Venâncio (born 4 February 1993) is a Portuguese professional footballer who plays as a central defender.

== Club career ==
=== Vitória Setúbal ===
Born in Gâmbia – Pontes – Alto da Guerra, Setúbal, Venâncio joined local Vitória FC's youth academy at the age of 9, then returned for his last year as a junior from S.L. Benfica. He made his Primeira Liga debut for the former club on 13 January 2013, coming on as a late substitute in a 5–0 home win against Moreirense FC. He scored his first league goal on 7 April of the same year, but in a 2–1 away loss to Rio Ave FC.

On 16 August 2017, Venâncio signed with English Championship side Sheffield Wednesday on a season-long loan. He made his league debut on 23 December, playing the full 90 minutes in the 1–2 home defeat against Middlesbrough.

Venâncio scored his only goal for Wednesday on 6 May 2018, helping the hosts to defeat Norwich City 5–1.

=== Vitória Guimarães ===
Venâncio signed a four-year contract with Vitória S.C. on 7 July 2018. A reserve player under Luís Castro in his first year, he became first choice after Ivo Vieira took over.

On 4 October 2020, Venâncio was loaned to Spanish Segunda División club CD Lugo for one year. He scored in 2–2 draws against Málaga CF (away) and Real Zaragoza (home), barely avoiding relegation after finishing 18th.

=== Eibar ===
On 6 July 2021, Venâncio joined SD Eibar of the same country and league on a three-year deal. He reached the La Liga play-offs with his team in 2022 and 2024, being eliminated in the semi-finals on both occasions.

=== Later career ===
Venâncio returned to the Portuguese top tier in summer 2024, agreeing to a two-year contract at newly promoted C.D. Santa Clara as a free agent.

== International career ==
Venâncio earned the first of his two caps for the Portugal under-21 team on 25 March 2013, featuring the last minutes of the 2–1 friendly defeat of the Republic of Ireland in Dundalk. He was part of the squad at the 2015 UEFA European Under-21 Championship, being an unused squad member for the runners-up.

== Personal life ==
Venâncio's father, Pedro, was also a footballer and a central defender. He too was brought up at Vitória.

== Career statistics ==
As of match played 2 May 2026

Appearances and goals by club, season and competition
Club	Season	League			National cup (Note: Includes Taça de Portugal, FA Cup, Copa del Rey)		League cup (Note: Includes Taça da Liga)		Continental		Other		Total	
Club	Season	Division	Apps	Goals	Apps	Goals	Apps	Goals	Apps	Goals	Apps	Goals	Apps	Goals
Vitória Setúbal	2012–13	Primeira Liga	7	1	0	0	3	0	—		—		10	1
Vitória Setúbal	2013–14	Primeira Liga	18	1	1	0	4	1	—		—		23	2
Vitória Setúbal	2014–15	Primeira Liga	31	1	1	0	3	0	—		—		35	1
Vitória Setúbal	2015–16	Primeira Liga	31	0	2	0	0	0	—		—		33	0
Vitória Setúbal	2016–17	Primeira Liga	26	3	1	0	4	1	—		—		31	4
Vitória Setúbal	2017–18	Primeira Liga	2	0	0	0	1	0	—		—		3	0
Vitória Setúbal	Total		115	6	5	0	15	2	—		—		135	8
Sheffield Wednesday (loan)	2017–18	Championship	20	1	5	0	0	0	—		—		25	1
Vitória Guimarães	2018–19	Primeira Liga	5	0	2	0	1	0	—		—		8	0
Vitória Guimarães	2019–20	Primeira Liga	20	0	0	0	3	0	3 (Note: Appearances in UEFA Europa League)	0	—		26	0
Vitória Guimarães	Total		25	0	2	0	4	0	3	0	—		34	0
Lugo (loan)	2020–21	Segunda División	36	2	1	0	—		—		—		37	2
Eibar	2021–22	Segunda División	27	0	0	0	—		—		2 (Note: Appearances in Segunda División play-offs)	0	29	0
Eibar	2022–23	Segunda División	29	1	2	0	—		—		—		31	1
Eibar	2023–24	Segunda División	19	0	1	0	—		—		—		20	0
Eibar	Total		75	1	3	0	—		—		2	0	80	1
Santa Clara	2024–25	Primeira Liga	26	0	3	0	0	0	—		—		29	0
Santa Clara	2025–26	Primeira Liga	22	1	3	0	1	0	4 (Note: Appearances in UEFA Conference League)	0	—		30	1
Santa Clara	Total		48	1	6	0	1	0	4	0	—		59	1
Career total			319	11	22	0	20	2	7	0	2	0	370	13
