= Edu Expósito =

Spanish footballer

Personal information
- Full name: Eduardo Expósito Jaén
- Date of birth: 1 August 1996 (age 30)
- Place of birth: Cubelles, Spain
- Height: 1.78 m (5 ft 10 in)
- Position: Central midfielder

Team information
- Current team: Espanyol
- Number: 8

Youth career
- Cubelles
- 2012-2013: Vilanova
- 2013–2014: Gavà
- 2014–2015: Damm

Senior career*
| Years | Team | Apps | (Gls) |
| 2015–2018 | Deportivo B | 87 | (14) |
| 2017–2019 | Deportivo La Coruña | 39 | (2) |
| 2019–2022 | Eibar | 106 | (11) |
| 2022– | Espanyol | 104 | (4) |

International career
| 2025– | Catalonia | 1 | (0) |
- * Club domestic league appearances and goals as of 27 May 2026

Eduardo "Edu" Expósito Jaén (born 1 August 1996) is a Spanish professional footballer who plays as a central midfielder for RCD Espanyol.

== Career ==
=== Deportivo La Coruña ===
Born in Cubelles, Barcelona, Catalonia, Expósito finished his formation with CF Damm, after previous stints with CF Cubelles, CF Vilanova and CF Gavà. On 20 July 2015, he signed a two-year contract with Deportivo de La Coruña, being initially assigned to the B-team in Tercera División.

Expósito made his senior debut on 23 August 2015, coming on as a late substitute in a 1–0 away win against CD Boiro. He scored his first goal on 13 September, the first in a 1–1 home draw against Alondras CF.

Expósito subsequently became a regular starter for the reserve side, and was first included in a first team matchday squad on 2 April 2017, being an unused substitute in a 3–0 La Liga away loss against Valencia CF. He made his debut in the competition on 7 May, starting in a 1–2 home defeat to RCD Espanyol but being replaced by Carles Gil at half-time.

On 13 October 2017, Expósito renewed his contract until 2022, and was definitely promoted to the first team ahead of the 2018–19 season, as his side was now in Segunda División. He scored his first professional goal on 8 December 2018, netting the opener in a 2–2 home draw against CD Numancia.

=== Eibar ===
On 13 July 2019, Expósito agreed to a five-year contract with SD Eibar in the top tier. He made his league debut for the club as a 32nd minute substitute for Gonzalo Escalante on 17 August against RCD Mallorca in a 2–1 defeat. He scored his first league goal for the club on 29 September against RC Celta de Vigo.

=== Espanyol ===
On 8 August 2022, Expósito signed a five-year contract with RCD Espanyol in the top tier.

== Career statistics ==
As of 28 January 2024

Appearances and goals by club, season and competition
| Club | Season | Division | League | | Cup | | Europe | | Other | | Total | |
| Club | Season | Division | Apps | Goals | Apps | Goals | Apps | Goals | Apps | Goals | Apps | Goals |
|---|---|---|---|---|---|---|---|---|---|---|---|---|
| Deportivo La Coruña | 2016–17 | La Liga | 1 | 0 | — | | — | | — | | 1 | 0 |
| Deportivo La Coruña | 2017–18 | La Liga | 3 | 0 | 2 | 0 | — | | — | | 5 | 0 |
| Deportivo La Coruña | 2018–19 | Segunda División | 35 | 2 | 1 | 0 | — | | 4 | 0 | 40 | 2 |
| Deportivo La Coruña | Total | | 39 | 2 | 3 | 0 | 0 | 0 | 4 | 0 | 46 | 2 |
| Eibar | 2019–20 | La Liga | 35 | 4 | 3 | 0 | — | | — | | 38 | 4 |
| Eibar | 2020–21 | La Liga | 31 | 0 | 3 | 0 | — | | — | | 34 | 0 |
| Eibar | 2021–22 | Segunda División | 40 | 8 | 3 | 1 | — | | 2 | 0 | 45 | 9 |
| Eibar | Total | | 106 | 12 | 9 | 1 | 0 | 0 | 2 | 0 | 117 | 13 |
| Espanyol | 2022–23 | La Liga | 28 | 2 | 4 | 1 | — | | — | | 32 | 3 |
| Espanyol | 2023–24 | Segunda División | 21 | 1 | 2 | 0 | — | | 0 | 0 | 40 | 2 |
| Espanyol | Total | | 49 | 3 | 6 | 1 | 0 | 0 | 0 | 0 | 55 | 4 |
| Career total | | | 194 | 17 | 18 | 2 | 0 | 0 | 6 | 0 | 218 | 19 |
