= Asier Benito =

Spanish footballer (born 1995)

Personal information
- Full name: Asier Benito Sasiain
- Date of birth: 11 February 1995 (age 31)
- Place of birth: Amurrio, Spain
- Height: 1.83 m (6 ft 0 in)
- Position: Forward

Team information
- Current team: Sestao River
- Number: 9

Youth career
- Indartsu
- 2011–2012: Athletic Bilbao
- 2012–2013: Aurrerá Vitoria

Senior career*
Years	Team	Apps	(Gls)
2013	Aurrerá Vitoria	6	(2)
2013–2017	Alavés B	97	(48)
2016	Alavés	2	(0)
2017–2019	Bilbao Athletic	64	(18)
2019–2021	Eibar	0	(0)
2019–2020	→ Ponferradina (loan)	32	(2)
2020–2021	→ Numancia (loan)	22	(9)
2021–2023	Asteras Tripolis	36	(1)
2023–2025	Real Unión	42	(6)
2025–	Sestao River	28	(7)
- * Club domestic league appearances and goals as of 14 May 2026

Asier Benito Sasiain (born 11 February 1995) is a Spanish professional footballer as a forward for Segunda Federación club Sestao River.

== Career ==
Benito was born in Amurrio, Álava, Basque Country. He finished his formation with CD Aurrerá de Vitoria, and made his senior debuts in the 2012–13 campaign, in Tercera División.

In 2013, Benito moved to Deportivo Alavés, being assigned to the reserves also in the fourth tier. On 17 June 2014, he renewed his link for a further year. On 13 March 2016, Benito made his professional debut, coming on as a late substitute for Gaizka Toquero in a 1–3 away loss against CA Osasuna in the Segunda División championship.

In 2017, he became involved in a contractual dispute with Alavés, subsequently transferring to another reserve team, Bilbao Athletic in Segunda División B. The move allowed him to easily continue his studies at the University of Deusto while continuing as a player.

On 2 July 2019, Benito signed a three-year deal with SD Eibar, but was loaned to second division side SD Ponferradina on 6 August. He scored his first professional goal on 5 October, netting his team's second in a 2–0 home win against CD Mirandés.

On 8 September 2020, Benito agreed to a one-year loan deal with CD Numancia, freshly relegated to the third division.

== Personal life ==
Benito's elder brother, Ander, is also a footballer. A defender, he was groomed at Amurrio Club.

== Career statistics ==
=== Club ===
As of match played 21 March 2021

Appearances and goals by club, season and competition
Club	Season	League			National Cup		Other		Total	
Club	Season	Division	Apps	Goals	Apps	Goals	Apps	Goals	Apps	Goals
Alavés	2015–16	Segunda División	2	0	0	0	—		2	0
Bilbao Athletic	2017–18	Segunda División B	36	12	—		2	0	38	12
Bilbao Athletic	2018–19	Segunda División B	26	6	—		—		26	6
Bilbao Athletic	Total		62	18	0	0	2	0	64	18
Ponferradina (loan)	2019–20	Segunda División	30	2	2	0	—		32	2
Numancia (loan)	2020–21	Segunda División B	16	6	2	0	—		18	6
Career total			110	26	4	0	2	0	116	26

== Honours ==
Alavés

- Segunda División: 2015–16
