= Esteban Burgos =

Argentine footballer

Personal information
- Full name: Esteban Rodrigo Burgos
- Date of birth: 9 January 1992 (age 34)
- Place of birth: Salta, Argentina
- Height: 1.90 m (6 ft 3 in)
- Position: Centre back

Team information
- Current team: Godoy Cruz

Youth career
- Gimnasia y Tiro

Senior career*
Years	Team	Apps	(Gls)
2011–2013	Gimnasia y Tiro	32	(1)
2013–2014	Talleres	25	(0)
2014–2017	Godoy Cruz	20	(0)
2016–2017	→ Rosario Central (loan)	13	(1)
2017–2019	Alcorcón	63	(7)
2019–2022	Eibar	47	(4)
2022–2023	Málaga	31	(1)
2023–2024	América Mineiro	4	(0)
2024	Defensa y Justicia	9	(0)
2024–2025	Independiente Rivadavia	14	(0)
2025–2026	San Martín SJ	12	(0)
2026–	Godoy Cruz	2	(0)
- * Club domestic league appearances and goals as of 18:48, 18 March 2026 (UTC)

Esteban Rodrigo Burgos (born 9 January 1992) is an Argentine footballer who plays as a central defender for Godoy Cruz.

== Club career ==
=== Argentina ===
Born in Salta, Burgos began his career with hometown club Gimnasia y Tiro, making his senior debut in 2011. After becoming a regular starter during the 2012–13 season, he joined Primera B Nacional side Talleres de Córdoba on 28 June 2013.

Burgos made his professional debut on 14 August 2013, starting in a 1–1 home draw against Club Atlético Douglas Haig. After again being first-choice, he signed for Godoy Cruz Antonio Tomba in Primera División on 10 July of the following year.

Burgos made his debut in the main category on 27 August 2014, starting in a 1–0 away win against Rosario Central. After featuring sparingly, he moved to the latter club on 5 January 2016, on an 18-month loan deal.

=== Alcorcón ===
On 7 July 2017 Burgos moved abroad for the first time in his career, after agreeing to a two-year deal with Segunda División side AD Alcorcón. He made his debut for the club on 19 August, starting in a 0–0 home draw against Sporting de Gijón.

=== Eibar ===
On 1 July 2019, free agent Burgos joined La Liga side SD Eibar, signing a three-year deal. He made his debut in the category on 14 December, replacing injured Pedro Bigas in a 0–0 away draw against Athletic Bilbao, and scored his first goal the following 18 January, netting the opener in a 2–0 home win over Atlético Madrid.

=== Málaga ===
On 15 July 2022, Burgos signed a two-year contract with Málaga CF in the second division. On 30 June of the following year, after the club's relegation, he left after activating an exit clause on his contract.

=== América Mineiro ===
On 26 July 2023, Burgos signed a short-term deal with Campeonato Brasileiro Série A side América Mineiro.

== Career statistics ==
=== Club ===
As of match played 14 March 2021

Appearances and goals by club, season and competition
Club	Season	League			National Cup		Continental		Total	
Club	Season	Division	Apps	Goals	Apps	Goals	Apps	Goals	Apps	Goals
Talleres	2013–14	Primera B	25	0	0	0	—		25	0
Godoy Cruz	2014–15	Argentine Primera División	7	0	0	0	2 (Note: Appearance(s) in Copa Sudamericana)	0	9	0
Godoy Cruz	2015	Argentine Primera División	13	0	1	0	—		14	0
Godoy Cruz	Total		20	0	1	0	2	0	23	0
Rosario Central (loan)	2016	Argentine Primera División	2	0	3	1	5 (Note: Appearance(s) in Copa Libertadores)	0	10	1
Rosario Central (loan)	2016–17	Argentine Primera División	11	1	0	0	—		11	1
Rosario Central (loan)	Total		13	1	3	1	5	0	21	2
Alcorcón	2017–18	Segunda División	31	1	0	0	—		31	1
Alcorcón	2018–19	Segunda División	32	6	0	0	—		32	6
Alcorcón	Total		63	7	0	0	0	0	63	7
Eibar	2019–20	La Liga	15	1	1	0	—		16	1
Eibar	2020–21	La Liga	13	3	3	0	—		16	3
Eibar	Total		28	4	4	0	0	0	32	4
Career total			149	12	8	1	7	0	164	13
