= Miguel Atienza =

Spanish footballer

Personal information
- Full name: Miguel Ángel Atienza Villa
- Date of birth: 27 May 1999 (age 27)
- Place of birth: Madrid, Spain
- Height: 1.86 m (6 ft 1 in)
- Position: Midfielder

Team information
- Current team: Leganés

Youth career
- Fuenlabrada

Senior career*
Years	Team	Apps	(Gls)
2017–2018	Fuenlabrada	7	(0)
2018–2021	Vitoria	69	(1)
2020–2022	Eibar	37	(0)
2022–2026	Burgos	156	(3)
2026–	Leganés	0	(0)
- * Club domestic league appearances and goals as of 6 June 2026

Miguel Ángel Atienza Villa (born 27 May 1999) is a Spanish professional footballer who plays as a midfielder for CD Leganés.

== Club career ==
Born in Madrid, Atienza was a CF Fuenlabrada youth graduate. He made his first team debut on 29 January 2017, starting in a 0–0 Segunda División B away draw against CDA Navalcarnero.

On 27 April 2018, Atienza signed a four-year contract with SD Eibar, being immediately assigned to the farm team CD Vitoria in Tercera División. He made his professional – and La Liga – debut on 4 January 2020, coming on as a second-half substitute for Sergio Álvarez in a 0–1 loss at Valencia CF.

Atienza scored his first senior goal on 9 February 2020, netting the opener for Vitoria in a 3–0 Tercera División home success over CD Basconia. On 3 July, he renewed his contract until 2023.

On 8 July 2022, Atienza signed a two-year deal with Segunda División side Burgos CF. On 23 June 2026, after four seasons as a regular starter, he left the club, and agreed to a three-year contract with fellow league team CD Leganés the following day.
