= Ekain Zenitagoia =

Spanish footballer (born 1994)

Ekain
Personal information
- Full name: Ekain Zenitagoia Arana
- Date of birth: 29 April 1994 (age 32)
- Place of birth: Durango, Spain
- Height: 1.79 m (5 ft 10 in)
- Position: Forward

Team information
- Current team: Murcia
- Number: 20

Youth career
- Durango

Senior career*
Years	Team	Apps	(Gls)
2013–2015	Iurretako	?	(20)
2015–2019	Durango	125	(42)
2019–2020	Amorebieta	25	(9)
2020–2023	Ibiza	90	(13)
2023–2025	Racing Santander	40	(4)
2025–	Murcia	28	(2)
- * Club domestic league appearances and goals as of 10 June 2026

Ekain Zenitagoia Arana (born 29 April 1994), simply known as Ekain, is a Spanish professional footballer who plays as a forward for Murcia.

== Club career ==
Ekain was born in Durango, Biscay, Basque Country, and finished his formation with hometown side SCD Durango. He made his senior debut with Iurretako KT in 2013, in the regional leagues, before returning to Cultu in 2015.

Ekain scored a career-best 18 goals for Durango during the 2017–18 season, as his club returned to Segunda División B after 12 years. He scored a further eight times in the following campaign, but could not prevent his team's relegation.

On 19 June 2019, Ekain signed for SD Amorebieta in the third division. On 13 August 2020, after scoring nine goals, he moved to fellow league team UD Ibiza.

Mainly used as a substitute, Ekain scored Ibiza's goal in a 1–0 win over UCAM Murcia CF on 23 May 2021, which sealed the club's first-ever promotion to Segunda División. He made his professional debut at the age of 27 on 13 August, starting in a 0–0 away draw against Real Zaragoza.

On 15 June 2023, after Ibiza's relegation, Ekain signed a two-year contract with Racing de Santander also in the second division.

On 19 July 2025, Ekain signed with Murcia in Primera Federación.
