= Ander Cantero =

Spanish footballer

Personal information
- Full name: Ander Cantero Armendariz
- Date of birth: 9 January 1995 (age 31)
- Place of birth: Pamplona, Spain
- Height: 1.89 m (6 ft 2 in)
- Position: Goalkeeper

Team information
- Current team: Burgos
- Number: 13

Youth career
- 2002–2012: Osasuna

Senior career*
Years	Team	Apps	(Gls)
2012–2015	Osasuna B	51	(0)
2014–2015	→ Zamora (loan)	16	(0)
2015	→ Real Madrid C (loan)	13	(0)
2015–2018	Villarreal B	64	(0)
2017–2019	Villarreal	0	(0)
2018–2019	→ Rayo Majadahonda (loan)	9	(0)
2019–2021	Lugo	75	(0)
2021–2023	Eibar	24	(0)
2023–2024	Racing Ferrol	42	(0)
2024–	Burgos	84	(0)

International career
2011	Spain U16	2	(0)
2011–2012	Spain U17	3	(0)
2013	Spain U18	2	(0)
2013	Spain U19	6	(0)
- * Club domestic league appearances and goals as of 6 June 2026

Ander Cantero Armendariz (born 9 January 1995) is a Spanish footballer who plays as a goalkeeper for Burgos.

== Club career ==
Born in Pamplona, Navarre, Cantero joined Osasuna's youth setup in 2002, aged seven. He made his senior debut with the reserves on 29 September 2012, starting in a 0–2 Segunda División B home loss against Izarra.

On 13 August 2014, Cantero was loaned to Zamora, also in the third division. After being sparingly used, he moved to Real Madrid C the following 30 January, still in a temporary deal.

On 7 July 2015, Cantero signed a three-year deal with another reserve team, Villarreal B also in the third tier. After spending his first season as a backup to Aitor Fernández, he subsequently became an undisputed starter for the B-side.

Ahead of the 2017–18 campaign, Cantero was promoted to the first team due to the injuries of both Sergio Asenjo and Andrés Fernández, and acted as a backup to Mariano Barbosa. On 25 October 2017 he made his debut with the main squad, starting in a 0–1 loss at Ponferradina for the season's Copa del Rey.

On 6 July 2018, Cantero was loaned to Segunda División side Rayo Majadahonda, for one year. He spent the majority of the campaign as a backup to longtime incumbent Basilio, and suffered team relegation.

On 9 July 2019, Cantero agreed to a four-year contract with Lugo, also in the second division. On 25 July 2021, he signed a three-year deal with Eibar, recently relegated to division two.

On 9 August 2023, after being only a backup option to Luca Zidane during the campaign, Cantero moved to fellow second division side Racing de Ferrol. On 7 July of the following year, he signed a three-year contract with Burgos in the same category.
