= Roberto Olabe (footballer, born 1996) =

Spanish footballer

Personal information
- Full name: Roberto Olabe del Arco
- Date of birth: 5 May 1996 (age 30)
- Place of birth: Salamanca, Spain
- Height: 1.75 m (5 ft 9 in)
- Position: Winger

Team information
- Current team: Turan Tovuz

Youth career
- Real Sociedad

Senior career*
| Years | Team | Apps | (Gls) |
| 2014–2015 | Berio | 32 | (1) |
| 2015–2016 | Real Sociedad B | 5 | (1) |
| 2016 | Villarreal C | 8 | (1) |
| 2016–2018 | Atlético Madrid B | 56 | (4) |
| 2016–2019 | Atlético Madrid | 0 | (0) |
| 2018–2019 | → Extremadura (loan) | 33 | (1) |
| 2019–2022 | Eibar | 1 | (0) |
| 2019–2020 | → Albacete (loan) | 16 | (0) |
| 2020 | → Extremadura (loan) | 10 | (0) |
| 2021 | → Tondela (loan) | 17 | (0) |
| 2022 | Alcorcón | 15 | (0) |
| 2022–2023 | Deportivo La Coruña | 34 | (0) |
| 2023–2025 | Ibiza | 63 | (2) |
| 2025– | Turan Tovuz | 31 | (4) |

International career
| 2012 | Spain U17 | 3 | (0) |
- * Club domestic league appearances and goals as of 21:41, 20 May 2026 (UTC)

Roberto Olabe del Arco (born 5 May 1996) is a Spanish professional footballer who plays as a left winger for Azerbaijan Premier League club Turan Tovuz.

== Club career ==
Born in Salamanca, Castile and León, Olabe represented Real Sociedad as a youth. After making his debut as a senior with the farm team in the 2014–15 season in the Tercera División, he was promoted to the reserves in June 2015.

On 4 January 2016, Olabe terminated his contract with Sanse and immediately joined Villarreal's C side in the fourth division. On 31 July, he moved to another reserve team, Atlético Madrid B in the same league.

Olabe made his competitive debut with Atlético Madrid on 30 November 2016, coming on as a late substitute for goalscorer Ángel Correa in a 6–0 away rout of Guijuelo in the round of 32 of the Copa del Rey. At the end of the campaign, he also helped the second team to promote to Segunda División B.

On 31 August 2018, Olabe was loaned to Extremadura of Segunda División for one year. He was a regular starter during his spell, as they easily avoided relegation.

On 7 July 2019, Olabe signed a four-year deal with La Liga's Eibar, but was loaned to second-tier club Albacete on 4 August. The following 22 January, his loan was cut short and he immediately moved back to Extremadura also in a temporary deal.

Olabe appeared in his first official match for Eibar on 17 December 2020, playing 90 minutes in the 2–0 win against Racing Rioja in the Spanish Cup. In January 2021, he was loaned to Tondela of the Portuguese Primeira Liga until 30 June.

Upon returning, Olabe was assigned to the main squad now in division two, but he made only three competitive appearances before terminating his contract on 31 January 2022. Just hours later, he agreed to a short-term deal at Alcorcón of the same league.

On 7 July 2022, Olabe joined Deportivo de La Coruña on a free transfer, signing a two-year contract. One year later, however, he moved to fellow Primera Federación club Ibiza on a one-year deal with the option for a further season.

== International career ==
Olabe represented Spain at under-17 level, earning three caps.

== Personal life ==
Olabe's father, also named Roberto, was also a footballer. A goalkeeper, he notably represented Salamanca before moving to coaching duties.

== Honours ==
Atlético Madrid

- UEFA Super Cup: 2018
