= Sergio Álvarez (footballer, born 1992) =

Spanish footballer

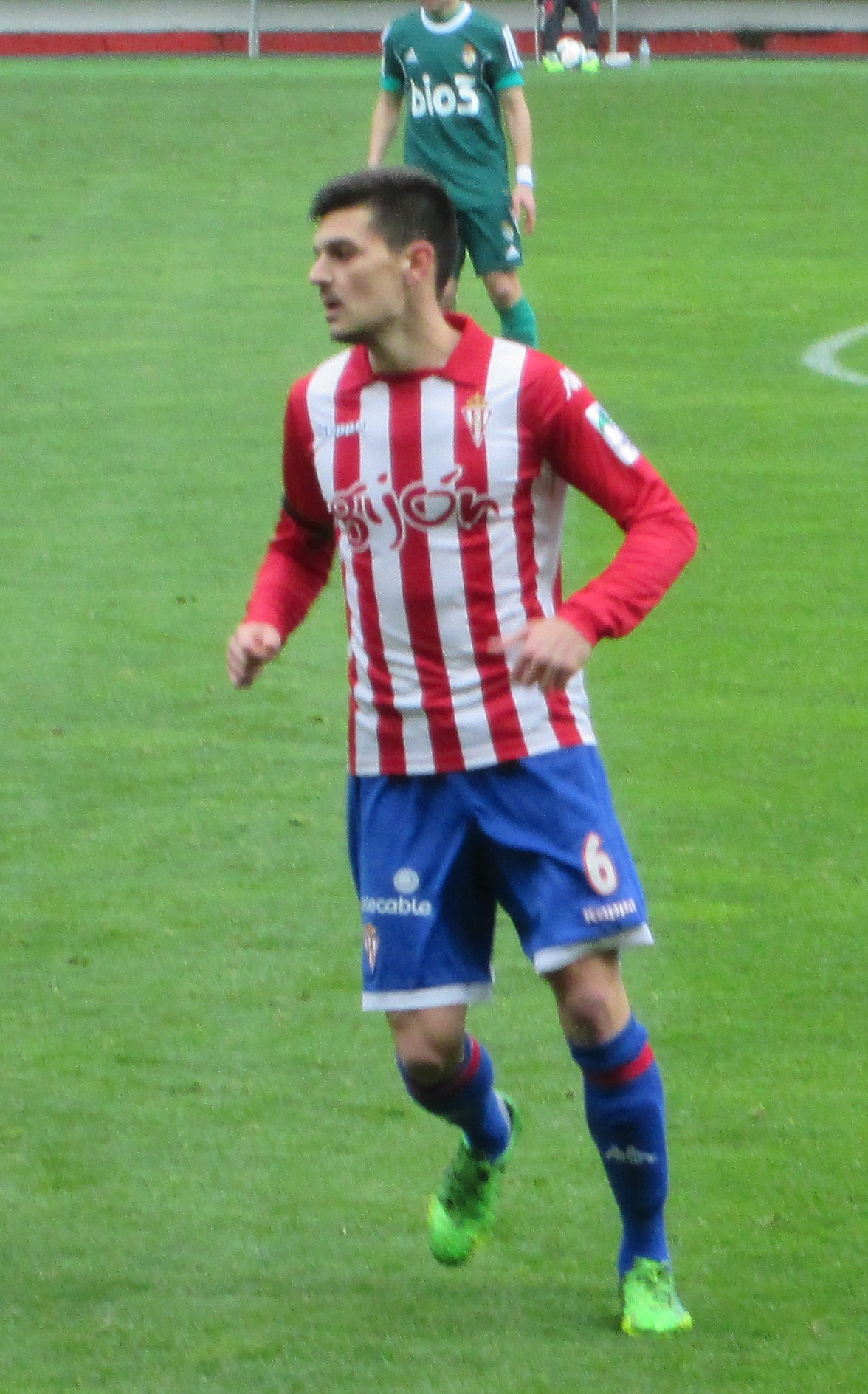
- Álvarez playing for Sporting Gijón in 2014

Personal information
- Full name: Sergio Álvarez Díaz
- Date of birth: 23 January 1992 (age 34)
- Place of birth: Avilés, Spain
- Height: 1.83 m (6 ft 0 in)
- Position: Midfielder

Team information
- Current team: Eibar
- Number: 6

Youth career
- 1998–2000: Nuestra Señora del Buen Consejo
- 2000–2004: Avilés
- 2004–2009: Sporting Gijón

Senior career*
Years	Team	Apps	(Gls)
2009–2013	Sporting Gijón B	74	(1)
2010–2018	Sporting Gijón	178	(11)
2018–	Eibar	241	(4)

International career
2009	Spain U18	2	(0)
2011	Spain U19	3	(0)
- * Club domestic league appearances and goals as of 6 June 2026

Sergio Álvarez Díaz (born 23 January 1992) is a Spanish professional footballer who plays as a central midfielder for Segunda División club Eibar.

== Club career ==
=== Sporting Gijón ===
Álvarez was born in Avilés, Asturias. A product of Sporting de Gijón's prolific youth academy, Mareo, the 17-year-old made it to the reserves during the 2009–10 season, with the side playing in the Segunda División B.

Álvarez made his debut with the main squad on 16 May 2010, starting in a 2–0 away loss against Racing de Santander and thus becoming the second youngest player ever to debut in La Liga for the club, at the age of 18 years and 113 days. However, he lost this record to Juan Muñiz that very match, when the latter entered the pitch in the 46th minute.

In summer 2013, Álvarez was definitely promoted to the first team, now in the Segunda División. On 9 July 2015, after achieving promotion to the top division, he renewed with the Rojiblancos until 2019.

Álvarez scored the first of his four career goals in the top flight on 8 May 2016, in the 1–1 draw at Getafe CF. His second came the following weekend, his 78th-minute long-range effort in the 2–0 home win over Villarreal CF keeping his team up in the last matchday.

=== Eibar ===
On 26 July 2018, after spending 14 years at the club, Álvarez left Sporting and signed a four-year contract with SD Eibar in the top tier.

== International career ==
In January 2010, Álvarez was summoned for the Spain under-18 team for the 'XXXVI International Atlantic Cup'.

== Career statistics ==
As of match played 22 May 2021

Appearances and goals by club, season and competition
Club	Season	League			National Cup		Other		Total	
Club	Season	Division	Apps	Goals	Apps	Goals	Apps	Goals	Apps	Goals
Sporting Gijón B	2009–10	Segunda División B	34	1	—		—		34	1
Sporting Gijón B	2010–11	Segunda División B	15	0	—		—		15	0
Sporting Gijón B	2012–13	Segunda División B	25	0	—		—		25	0
Sporting Gijón B	Total		74	1	0	0	0	0	74	1
Sporting Gijón	2009–10	La Liga	1	0	0	0	—		1	0
Sporting Gijón	2010–11	La Liga	8	0	1	0	—		9	0
Sporting Gijón	2011–12	La Liga	6	0	2	0	—		8	0
Sporting Gijón	2013–14	Segunda División	27	2	1	0	2 (Note: Appearances in La Liga play-offs)	0	30	2
Sporting Gijón	2014–15	Segunda División	40	3	0	0	—		40	3
Sporting Gijón	2015–16	La Liga	27	2	0	0	—		27	2
Sporting Gijón	2016–17	La Liga	36	2	0	0	—		36	2
Sporting Gijón	2017–18	Segunda División	33	2	0	0	2	0	35	2
Sporting Gijón	Total		178	11	4	0	4	0	186	11
Eibar	2018–19	La Liga	19	0	2	0	—		21	0
Eibar	2019–20	La Liga	18	0	2	0	—		20	0
Eibar	2020–21	La Liga	27	0	3	0	—		30	0
Eibar	Total		64	0	7	0	0	0	71	0
Career total			316	12	11	0	4	0	331	12
