= Ipurua Municipal Stadium =

Football stadium in Spain

Ipurua
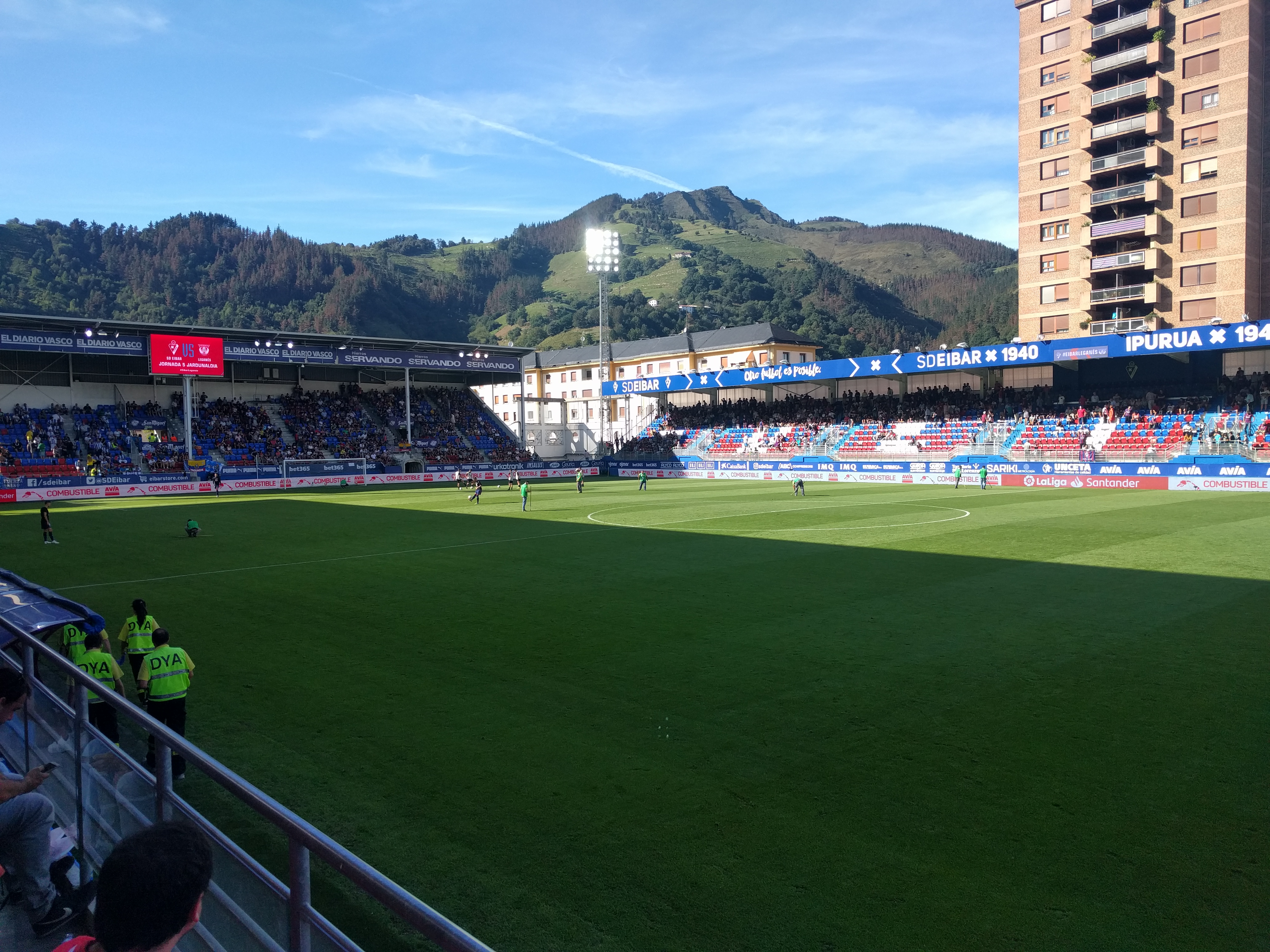
- Interactive map of Ipurua
- Location: Eibar, Spain
- Coordinates: 43°10′54″N 2°28′33″W
- Owner: Eibar City Council
- Operator: Eibar City Council
- Capacity: 8,164
- Record attendance: 7,732 (Eibar v Oviedo; 12 June 2024)
- Field size: 103 metres (113 yd) × 65 metres (71 yd)

Construction
- Opened: 1947
- Renovated: 1989, 2016, 2019

Tenants
- SD Eibar (1947–present); SD Eibar (women) (2023–present)

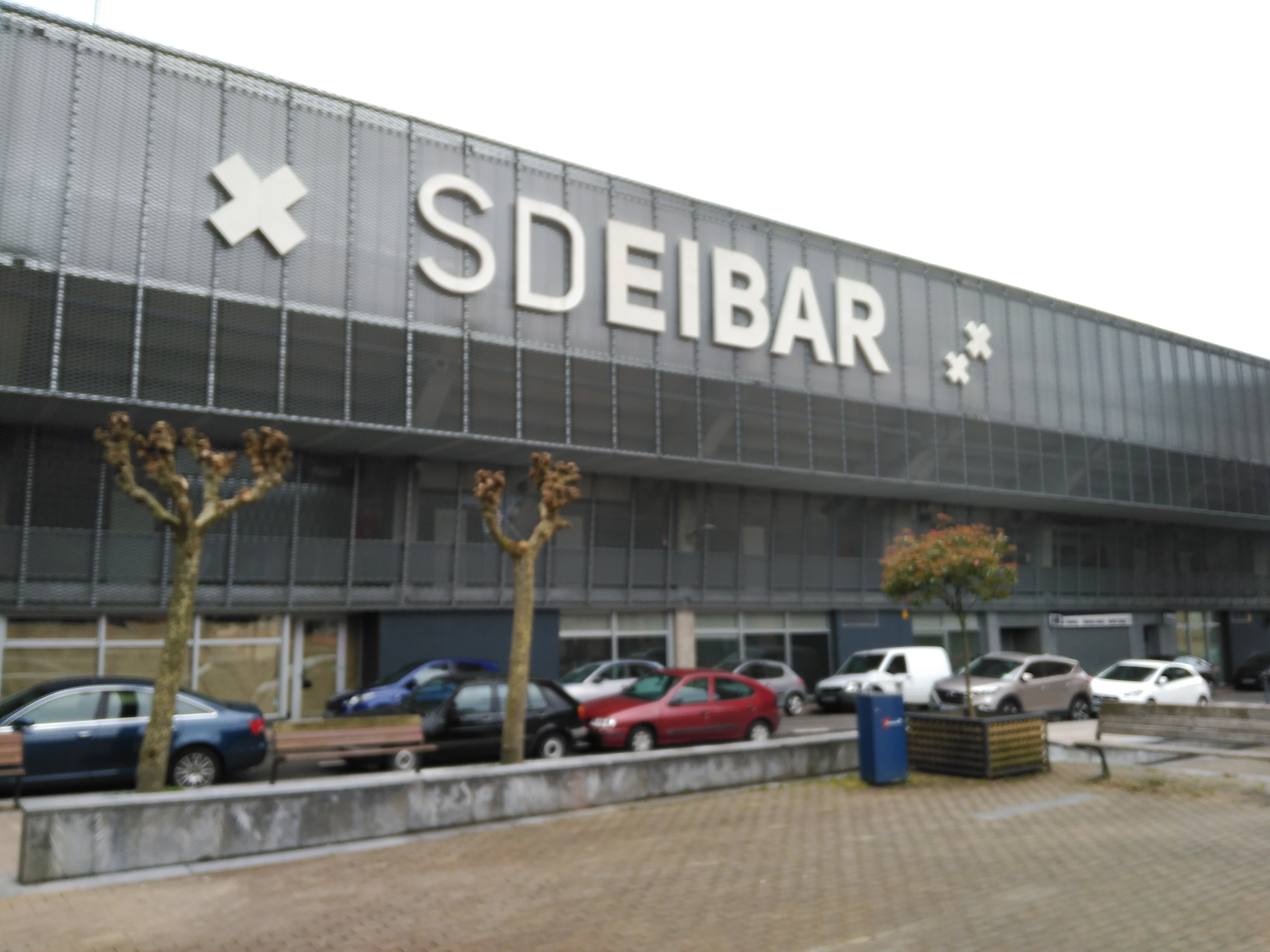
Ipurua façade

Ipurua Futbol Zelaia (also written Ipurúa), is an all-seater football stadium in Eibar, Spain, serving as the home ground of SD Eibar.

Opened in 1947, the stadium has a capacity of 8,164 seats. Ipurua has been the principal football ground in Eibar since 1947. Numerous simple fields were used before Ipurua became the first enclosed ground. It was inaugurated on 14 September 1947, with a match between SD Eibar and their local rivals CD Elgoibar that was a 0–2 defeat.

== History ==
=== Opening and first years ===
Work began on the central main stand in 1948 and this was finally opened in 1951. Because the ground lies at the bottom of a steep valley, the pitch was prone to flooding and poor drainage. Steps were taken to address this and a new drainage system and pitch levelling was completed in 1959. The ground remained relatively basic throughout the 1960s, but in 1970 the popular preferente end was covered and the roof of the main stand was extended. The first floodlights were also installed in 1970 and they were inaugurated on 14 October 1970 with a match between Real Sociedad and Athletic Bilbao. During the 1980s Eibar’s fortunes improved on the field and basic improvements were made to the ground. This included the erection of a basic cover at the western end of the ground.

=== Promotion to Segunda and first expansion ===
In 1989 SD Eibar promoted to Segunda División, but Ipurua was probably the most basic stadium in the division. Matters were complicated by the fact that the urban area of Eibar had spread westwards and severely restricted space to the north of the ground. The club received funding in 1998 from the local council and Liga de Fútbol Profesional and started a project to completely remodel Ipurua. In 1998, the original main stand was demolished and a new, full-length covered stand was constructed. This had a capacity of approximately 2,800, which would be over half of remodelled grounds capacity. In 1999, work started on refurbishing the end stands and in 2001, the narrow north terrace was roofed and 4 rows of seats were installed. Work was completed with the installation of a new drainage system and pitch.

=== Promotion to La Liga and second expansion ===
In 2014, following SD Eibar's promotion to La Liga, a project to redevelop the north stand and bring the stadium's capacity up to more than 6,000 seats was approved by the local council. The fully completed stand was inaugurated on 30 August 2015, for a league match played between the hosts SD Eibar and neighbouring Basque club Athletic Bilbao. On 9 May 2016, works to demolish and redevelop the east end stand began. The works, completed in January 2017, also provided an underground parking garage, space for the club's museum and the club's official store, new service areas and the possibility of making the adjacent street pedestrian on match days. As a result, the stadium's capacity was brought up to 7,083 seats. The pitch measures 103 × 65 m. In May 2018, works to demolish and redevelop the west end stand began. The new stand is expected to be finished by August 2019 and will bring the stadium's capacity up to 8,164 seats.

Ipurua remains a modern-yet-compact stadium with full UEFA certification, although many visiting La Liga teams have complained that its 7,000 seats are not up to par for a top flight stadium. In September 2018, a supporting barrier in the away fans' section of one stand collapsed under the weight of supporters who had rushed to the front to celebrate a goal for their club Sevilla, resulting in several minor injuries.
