= Rober Correa =

Spanish footballer

Personal information
- Full name: Roberto Antonio Correa Silva
- Date of birth: 20 September 1992 (age 34)
- Place of birth: Badajoz, Spain
- Height: 1.80 m (5 ft 11 in)
- Position: Right-back

Team information
- Current team: Extremadura
- Number: 4

Youth career
- Flecha Negra
- 2009–2010: San José Promesas
- 2010: Flecha Negra
- 2010–2011: Rayo Vallecano

Senior career*
Years	Team	Apps	(Gls)
2011–2013	Rayo Vallecano B	55	(2)
2012	Rayo Vallecano	2	(0)
2013–2015	Espanyol B	53	(1)
2015–2017	Espanyol	7	(0)
2016–2017	→ Elche (loan)	28	(1)
2017–2019	Cádiz	53	(1)
2019–2024	Eibar	75	(0)
2024–2025	Racing Ferrol	23	(0)
2025–	Extremadura	13	(0)
- * Club domestic league appearances and goals as of 15:18, 30 September 2026 (UTC)

Roberto "Rober" Antonio Correa Silva (born 20 September 1992) is a Spanish professional footballer who plays as a right-back for Primera Federación club Extremadura.

== Club career ==
Born in Badajoz, Extremadura, Correa joined Rayo Vallecano's youth academy in 2010, aged 18. He made his senior debut with the reserves in the 2011–12 season, in the Segunda División B.

On 21 April 2012, Correa made his first-team – and La Liga – debut, in a 2–1 away loss against Sporting de Gijón. He also started the 0–7 home defeat to FC Barcelona, scoring an own goal.

Correa left the Madrid outskirts side on 11 July 2013 and signed a three-year contract with another reserve team, RCD Espanyol B. On 12 June 2015, he renewed his link until 2018 and was definitely promoted to the main squad. On 1 November, he was sent off after two yellow cards in ten minutes of the home fixture with Granada CF, but his team still managed to draw 1–1 thanks to a last-minute goal by Felipe Caicedo.

On 20 July 2016, Correa was loaned to Segunda División club Elche CF for one year. He scored his first goal as a professional on 27 January 2017, when he featured as a first-half substitute and netted two minutes from the end of a 1–0 home win over Girona FC. On 7 August that year, after suffering relegation, he signed a two-year deal with Cádiz CF in the same league.

Correa agreed to a three-year contract at top-flight SD Eibar on 5 July 2019, as a free agent. He played 30 total matches in his first two seasons, three of those being in the Copa del Rey.

On 3 September 2024, Correa joined Racing de Ferrol in the second division on a free transfer. In November 2025, the 33-year-old moved two tiers down to Segunda Federación and signed for CD Extremadura.
