= Anaitz Arbilla =

Spanish professional footballer

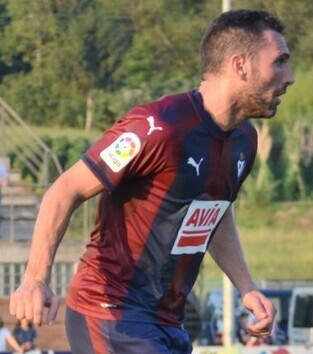
- Arbilla with Eibar in 2017

Personal information
- Full name: Anaitz Arbilla Zabala
- Date of birth: 15 May 1987 (age 39)
- Place of birth: Pamplona, Spain
- Height: 1.78 m (5 ft 10 in)
- Position: Defender

Team information
- Current team: Eibar
- Number: 23

Youth career
- 2003–2005: Athletic Bilbao

Senior career*
Years	Team	Apps	(Gls)
2005–2006	Basconia	22	(1)
2006–2009	Bilbao Athletic	67	(1)
2008–2009	→ Barakaldo (loan)	32	(0)
2009–2010	Poli Ejido	36	(0)
2010–2011	Salamanca	31	(0)
2011–2013	Hércules	49	(3)
2013–2014	Rayo Vallecano	41	(1)
2014–2016	Espanyol	35	(1)
2016–	Eibar	292	(9)

International career
2018–2020	Basque Country	2	(1)
- * Club domestic league appearances and goals as of 6 June 2026

Anaitz Arbilla Zabala (born 15 May 1987) is a Spanish professional footballer who plays as a full-back or a central defender for Segunda División club Eibar.

== Club career ==
Born in Pamplona, Navarre, Arbilla began his senior career in 2004 with CD Basconia, Athletic Bilbao's farm team. Two years later, he progressed to the reserves in the Segunda División B and, in summer 2008, after being unable to reach the main squad due to the presence of Spanish internationals Asier del Horno and Andoni Iraola, was loaned to another club in the Basque Country and that level, Barakaldo CF.

Arbilla signed with Polideportivo Ejido (also in the third tier) for the 2009–10 campaign. The following year, he had his first experience in the Segunda División, joining UD Salamanca and starting in 29 league games as the Castile and León team suffered relegation.

In late August 2011, Arbilla moved to another side in the second division, Hércules CF, for a €200,000 fee. He reached La Liga in January 2013, after arriving as a free agent at Rayo Vallecano. He made his debut in the Spanish top flight on 10 February, playing the full 90 minutes in a 2–1 home win against Atlético Madrid; he started in eight of his 11 appearances as the Madrid outskirts club retained its league status.

Arbilla scored his first goal for Rayo and in the top tier on 8 February 2014, his team's second in the 4–1 victory over Málaga CF also at Campo de Fútbol de Vallecas; On 10 May, he was shown a straight red card in a 4–0 loss away to Villarreal CF.

Arbilla signed a four-year contract with RCD Espanyol on 22 May 2014. He established himself as a starter in the second part of his first season in Catalonia, but the second was ruined by a serious injury to the Achilles tendon of his left leg which eventually required surgery.

Now recovered but out of favour, on 30 August 2016 Arbilla agreed to a three-year deal at fellow top-division SD Eibar. Having been at other clubs for a maximum of two years he became settled at the Armeros, eventually becoming their captain, and on 2 April 2026, aged 38, reached the milestone of 300 appearances spread over a decade; he celebrated this by scoring the only goal of a win at Real Sociedad B.
