= 2016–17 SD Eibar season =

Eibar
2016–17 season
- President: Amaia Gorostiza
- Head coach: José Luis Mendilibar
- Stadium: Ipurua
- La Liga: 10th
- Copa del Rey: Quarter-finals
- Top goalscorer: League: Sergi Enrich (11); All: Sergi Enrich (12)
- Highest home attendance: 5,780 vs Atlético Madrid (7 January 2017)
- Lowest home attendance: 4,265 vs Valencia (17 September 2016)
- Average home league attendance: 4,837
Home colours	Away colours	Third colours

The 2016–17 season was Eibar's third consecutive season in La Liga after finishing in 14th place the previous season to ensure another year in the Spanish top flight.

== Season ==
On 5 May, Eibar announced their first ever international tour with visits to Philadelphia, Pennsylvania and Las Vegas, Nevada in the United States. The tour objectives as stated by the club were, "to improve the brand image, the internationalization of the club, bring the club to shareholders, fans and club members in this country and open up possibilities for sponsorship mediums in the United States." On 23 May, Eibar announced the election of Amaia Gorostiza as the new president and the first female to hold the post for the club. Later in the day, the first match of the US Tour was held at Richard Wackar Stadium at Rowan University in Glassboro, New Jersey, against the Philadelphia Fury of the American Soccer League (ASL). The match ended 1–1 with a goal from Borja Bastón in the 44th minute. The team played their next match at Sam Boyd Stadium in Las Vegas versus the New York Cosmos of the North American Soccer League (NASL). The match ended 2–2 with goals from Gonzalo Escalante and Antonio Luna, respectively; however, the team went on to lose 5–4 in the penalty shoot-out.

On 20 July, Eibar announced a partnership agreement with current Segunda División B club UD Logroñés. The agreement will see Eibar send a minimum of three and a maximum of six players out on loan to Logroñés for the next three seasons. On 19 August, Eibar opened the league season against Deportivo La Coruña at the Estadio Riazor. After scoring first with a goal from Iván Ramis, the game ended 2–1 in favor of the hosts. On 27 August, Eibar earned its first league victory in the home opener, beating Valencia 1–0 with a goal from Pedro León. On 11 September, after the FIFA international break, Eibar defeated Granada at Los Cármenes 2–1 with goals from Pedro León and Sergi Enrich. On 17 September, Eibar claimed a 1–1 draw against Sevilla with nine men after goalkeeper Yoel Rodríguez and captain Dani García both saw red cards. On 20 September, down in La Rosaleda, Eibar lost 2–1 against Málaga with the lone goal coming from La Liga debutante Nano. On 24 September, Eibar defeated Real Sociedad with a scoreline of 2–0, making it the third consecutive victory in Ipurua over their Basque neighbors in the Primera División.

On 2 October, Eibar earned a historic point and a first goal at the Santiago Bernabéu Stadium when they earned a 1–1 draw against European Champions Real Madrid. Fran Rico opened the scoring in the sixth minute with a header in the box for the historic goal. On 17 October, Eibar loss their first home match 2–3 against Osasuna, with goals from Gonzalo Escalante and Sergi Enrich. On 30 October, Eibar fought back to earn all 3 points against Villarreal. After falling a goal back, the Armeros left it late and won 2–1 with goals by Ramis (80th) and Pedro León (87th). On 6 November, Eibar lost on the road in added time on a penalty to Las Palmas with a 0–1 scoreline. On 19 November, Eibar returned home to a 1–0 victory over Celta Vigo. Fran Rico scored Eibar's 100th goal in La Liga play. On 25 November, Eibar thumped Real Betis 3–1 to continue their hot home streak. On 29 November, in the 2016–17 Copa del Rey Round of 32 first leg encounter, Eibar took a 2–1 advantage back home over Sporting Gijon with goals from Bebé and Rubén Peña.

== Squad ==
=== Team statistics ===
Number	Position	Name	Age	Since	La Liga					Copa del Rey					Signed from	Notes
Number	Position	Name	Age	Since	Apps	Mins	Goal	Booked	Sent off (straight red)	Apps	Mins	Goal	Booked	Sent off (straight red)	Signed from	Notes
Goalkeepers
1	GK	(Spain) Yoel Rodríguez	38	2016	20	1698	0	1	1	5	450	0	0	0	Valencia (on loan)
13	GK	(Spain) Asier Riesgo	42	2015	14	1135	0	0	1	1	90	0	0	0	Osasuna
30	GK	(Spain) Markel Areitio	30	2016	1	45	0	0	0	0	0	0	0	0	Durango
Defenders
3	CB	(Spain) Álex Gálvez	37	2016	14	1014	0	3	0	0	0	0	0	0	(Germany) Werder Bremen
4	CB	(Spain) Iván Ramis	41	2015	19	1482	3	4	0	0	0	0	0	0	Levante	Source
7	RB	(Spain) Ander Capa (vice-captain)	34	2012	26	2118	0	8	0	1	90	0	0	0	Youth system
15	CB	(Argentina) Mauro dos Santos	37	2015	11	763	0	1	0	1	90	0	0	0	Almería
18	RB	(Spain) Anaitz Arbilla	39	2016	18	1345	0	4	0	0	0	0	0	0	Espanyol
19	LB	(Spain) Antonio Luna	35	2015	25	2076	1	3	0	0	0	0	0	0	(England) Aston Villa
20	CB	(France) Florian Lejeune	36	2016	29	2520	1	6	1	1	90	0	0	0	(England) Manchester City
23	LB	(Spain) David Juncà	32	2015	3	186	0	1	0	1	90	0	0	0	Girona
Midfielders
5	MF	(Argentina) Gonzalo Escalante	33	2015	26	1723	2	8	0	1	90	0	1	0	(Italy) Catania
6	MF	(Spain) Cristian Rivera	29	2016	12	510	0	1	0	1	75	0	1	0	Real Oviedo
8	AM	(Japan) Takashi Inui	38	2015	22	1590	1	5	0	1	5	0	0	0	(Germany) Eintracht Frankfurt
10	AM	(Spain) Jota	35	2016	5	200	0	0	0	1	90	0	0	0	(England) Brentford (on loan)
11	MF	(Spain) Rubén Peña	35	2016	25	967	1	2	0	1	90	1	0	0	Leganés
14	MF	(Spain) Dani García (captain)	36	2014	30	2645	1	8	1	0	0	0	0	0	Real Sociedad
16	MF	(Spain) Fran Rico	39	2016	17	1226	2	5	0	1	15	0	0	0	Granada (on loan)	Source
21	MF	(Spain) Pedro León	39	2016	32	2620	10	4	0	0	0	0	0	0	Getafe
24	MF	(Spain) Adrián González	38	2015	23	1379	7	3	0	0	0	0	0	0	Elche
Forwards
9	FW	(Spain) Sergi Enrich	36	2015	32	2364	10	4	0	0	0	0	0	0	Numancia
17	FW	(Spain) Kike	36	2016	18	1083	6	7	0	1	19	0	0	0	(England) Middlesbrough
22	FW	(Spain) Nano	31	2016	6	159	1	0	0	1	85	0	0	0	Tenerife
25	FW	(Portugal) Bebé	36	2016	19	678	3	2	0	1	71	1	0	0	(Portugal) Benfica

Last updated: 29 November 2016
Source: First Team Statistics

==== From youth squad ====
Note: Flags indicate national team as defined under FIFA eligibility rules; some limited exceptions apply. Players may hold more than one non-FIFA nationality.

No.	Pos.	Nation	Player
29	MF	ESP	Asier Etxaburu
30	GK	ESP	Markel Areitio

No.	Pos.	Nation	Player
33	DF	ESP	Imanol Corral
—	GK	ESP	Quique Cebriá

=== Technical staff ===
Position	Name
First team manager	José Luis Mendilibar
Assistant coach	Iñaki Bea
Fitness coach	Toni Ruiz
Fitness coach	Alain Gandiaga
Goalkeeping coach	Josu Anuzita
Physiotherapist	Manu Sánchez
Physiotherapist	Unai Ormazabal
Doctor	Alberto Fernández
Team liaison	German Andueza
Equipment manager	Ángel Fernández

Last updated: 1 June 2016
Source: Technical staff

=== Transfers ===
==== In ====
Number	Position	Name	Age	Moving from	Type	Transfer window	Source
–	FW	(Spain) Kike	36	(England) Middlesbrough	Transfer	Summer
–	MF	(Spain) Rubén Peña	35	Leganés	Transfer	Summer
–	MF	(Spain) Pere Milla	33	Logroñés	Transfer	Summer
–	DF	(Spain) Unai Elgezabal	33	Barakaldo	Transfer	Summer
–	DF	(France) Florian Lejeune	36	(England) Manchester City	Transfer	Summer
–	DF	(Spain) Jordi Calavera	31	Gimnàstic	Transfer	Summer
–	MF	(Spain) Cristian Rivera	29	Real Oviedo	Transfer	Summer
–	MF	(Spain) Pedro León	39	Getafe	Transfer	Summer
–	GK	(Spain) Yoel Rodríguez	38	Valencia	Loan	Summer
–	RB	(Spain) Roger Escoruela	30	Gavà	Transfer	Summer
–	FW	(Portugal) Bebé	36	(Portugal) Benfica	Transfer	Summer
–	FW	(Spain) Juanfran	34	Villanovense	Transfer	Summer
–	CB	(Spain) Álex Gálvez	37	(Germany) Werder Bremen	Transfer	Summer
–	MF	(Spain) Fran Rico	39	Granada	Loan	Summer
–	FW	(Spain) Nano	31	Tenerife	Transfer	Summer
–	RB	(Spain) Anaitz Arbilla	39	Espanyol	Transfer	Summer

==== Out ====
Number	Position	Name	Age	Moving to	Type	Transfer window	Source
3	DF	(Serbia) Aleksandar Pantić	34	Villarreal	Loan return	Summer
6	DM	(Croatia) Josip Radošević	32	(Italy) Napoli	Loan return	Summer
11	MF	(Bosnia and Herzegovina) Izet Hajrović	35	(Germany) Werder Bremen	Loan return	Summer
18	FW	(Spain) Borja Bastón	34	Atlético Madrid	Loan return	Summer
1	GK	(Spain) Xabi Irureta	40	Zaragoza	End of contract	Summer
25	GK	(Spain) Jaime Jiménez	45	Retired	End of contract	Summer
23	DF	(Spain) Borja Ekiza	38	(Ukraine) Zirka	End of contract	Summer
21	FW	(Spain) Saúl Berjón	40	(Mexico) UNAM	End of contract	Summer
2	DF	(Spain) Ion Ansotegi	44	Mallorca	End of contract	Summer
20	MF	(Spain) Keko Gontán	34	Málaga	Transfer	Summer
16	FB	(Spain) Lillo	37	Sporting Gijón	Contract rescinded	Summer
10	CF	(Spain) Mikel Arruabarrena	43	(Hong Kong) Eastern	Contract rescinded	Summer
–	RB	(Spain) Roger Escoruela	30	Real Unión	Loan	Summer
–	GK	(Spain) Jon Ander Felipe	31	Logroñés	Loan	Summer
–	DF	(Spain) Jon Ander Amelibia	32	Logroñés	Loan	Summer
–	LB	(Spain) Sergi García	36	Logroñés	Loan	Summer
–	CF	(Spain) Thaylor Lubanzadio	32	Logroñés	Loan	Summer
–	LB	(Spain) Ander Gayoso	33	Tudelano	Loan	Summer
–	RB	(Spain) Txemi García	30	Bermeo	Loan	Summer
–	FW	(Spain) Juanfran	34	Logroñés	Loan	Summer
–	CB	(Spain) Mikel Gurrutxaga	30	Amurrio	Loan	Summer
–	MF	(Spain) Pere Milla	33	UCAM Murcia	Loan	Summer
–	AM	(Spain) Iñigo Barrenetxea	32	Sestao	Loan	Summer
2	DF	(Spain) Jordi Calavera	31	Lugo	Loan	Summer
–	DF	(Spain) Unai Elgezabal	33	Alcorcón	Loan	Summer

== Competitions ==
=== Overall ===
Competition	Started round	Current position/round	Final position/round	First match	Last match
La Liga	—	—	10th	19 August 2016	21 May 2016
Copa del Rey	Round of 32	—	Quarter-finals	3 December 2016	25 January 2017

=== Record ===
Competition	Record							
Competition	Pld	W	D	L	GF	GA	GD	Win %
La Liga	38	15	9	14	56	51	+5	39.47
Copa del Rey	6	3	2	1	10	7	+3	50.00
Total	44	18	11	15	66	58	+8	40.91

Last updated: 20 April 2017
Source: Competitions

=== Pre-season and friendlies ===
Kickoff times are in CEST or CET.

Win Draw Loss

Round	Date	Time	Opponent	Venue	Score	Scorer	Attendance	Referee
United States Tour	22 May 2016	21:00	(United States) Philadelphia Fury	N	1–1	Borja Bastón 44'
United States Tour	25 May 2016	04:00	(United States) New York Cosmos	N	2–2 (4–5 p)	Escalante 3', Luna 9'		Juan Guzman Jr (United States)
Pre-season	19 July 2016	19:00	Real Unión	A	1–0	Milla 19'	300	Julen Escarelo (Basque Country)
Pre-season	22 July 2016	19:00	Real Sociedad B	H	0–1
Pre-season	26 July 2016	20:00	Mirandés	A	2–2	Kike G. 60', Elgezabal 74'	1,200	Díez Cano (Castile and León)
Austrian Tour	28 July 2016	18:00	(Qatar) Lekhwiya	N	3–1	Elgezabal 23', Milla 53', Bebé 68'		Patrick Elsler (Austria)
Austrian Tour	30 July 2016	16:00	(Turkey) Beşiktaş	N	0–3
Austrian Tour	4 August 2016	18:00	(Germany) 1. FC Köln	N	0–2
Austrian Tour	6 August 2016	18:30	(Germany) RB Leipzig	N	2–3	Bebé 31', 33'
Kilometroak 2016	10 August 2016	18:00	Real Sociedad	N	1–1	Rubén Peña 52'		Rezola Etxeberria (Basque Country)
Pre-season	12 August 2016	19:00	Osasuna	N	1–0	Kike G. 23'	2,000	Galech Apeztegia (Navarre)
City of Zaragoza Trophy	13 August 2016	21:00	Real Zaragoza	A	2–2 (5–6 p)	M. M. Dos Santos 56', Inui 72'	2,000	Prieto Iglesias (Navarre)
Barreda Balompié Centenary	1 September 2016	19:00	Sporting Gijón	N	1–1	Adrián 83'		Cordero Vega (Cantabria)
Friendly	6 October 2016	18:00	Leganés	N	1–0	Inui 6'	500	Díaz Cano (Burgos)
Friendly	10 November 2016	12:00	Osasuna	N	0–4		1,000	Prieto Iglesias (Navarre)

=== Primera División ===
==== League table ====
Pos	Team	Pld	W	D	L	GF	GA	GD	Pts
8	Espanyol	38	15	11	12	49	50	−1	56
9	Alavés	38	14	13	11	41	43	−2	55
10	Eibar	38	15	9	14	56	51	+5	54
11	Málaga	38	12	10	16	49	55	−6	46 (Note: Málaga ahead of Valencia on head-to-head points: Valencia–Málaga 2–2, Málaga–Valencia 2–0)
12	Valencia	38	13	7	18	56	65	−9	46

Source: La Liga, Soccerway
Rules for classification: 1) Points; 2) Head-to-head points; 3) Head-to-head goal difference; 4) Goal difference; 5) Goals scored; 6) Fair-play points; 7) Play-off.

==== Results summary ====
Overall								Home						Away					
Pld	W	D	L	GF	GA	GD	Pts	W	D	L	GF	GA	GD	W	D	L	GF	GA	GD
38	15	9	14	56	51	+5	54	10	3	6	29	21	+8	5	6	8	27	30	−3

Last updated: 14 May 2017.
Source: SDEibar.com

==== Result round by round ====
Round	1	2	3	4	5	6	7	8	9	10	11	12	13	14	15	16	17	18	19	20	21	22	23	24	25	26	27	28	29	30	31	32	33	34	35	36	37	38
Ground	A	H	A	H	A	H	A	H	A	H	A	H	H	A	H	A	H	A	H	H	A	H	A	H	A	H	A	H	A	H	A	A	H	A	H	A	H	A
Result	L	W	W	D	L	W	D	L	D	W	L	W	W	L	D	D	L	W	L	W	W	W	L	W	D	L	D	D	W	W	W	L	L	D	W	L	L	L
Position	15	8	6	7	9	8	7	8	11	8	11	8	7	8	8	8	10	9	10	10	7	7	7	7	7	8	8	8	8	8	7	8	8	8	8	8	8	8

Updated to match(es) played on 14 May 2017. Source: League matches
A = Away; H = Home; W = Win; D = Draw; L = Loss

==== Matches ====
Kickoff times are in CEST or CET.

Win Draw Loss

Round	Date	Time	Opponent	H/A	Score	Scorer	Attendance	Referee
1	19 August 2016	22:00	Deportivo La Coruña	A	1–2	N.E. Ramis 54'	21,441	Melero López (Andalusia)
2	27 August 2016	18:15	Valencia	H	1–0	P. León 62'	4,419	Hernández Hernández (Canary Islands)
3	11 September 2016	18:15	Granada	A	2–1	P. León 43', Riesgo (red card) 32', Sergi Enrich 90+4'	15,916	Trujillo Suárez (Canary Islands)
4	17 September 2016	18:30	Sevilla	H	1–1	Yoel (red card) 45', P. León 64', Dani García (red card) 86'	4,265	Álvarez Izquierdo (Catalonia)
5	20 September 2016	20:00	Málaga	A	1–2	Nano M. 42'	30,370	Iglesias Villanueva (Galicia)
6	24 September 2016	13:00	Real Sociedad	H	2–0	P. León (penalty missed) 25', Illarramendi 57' (o.g.), Bebé 66'	4,798	José María Sánchez Martínez (Murcia)
7	2 October 2016	16:15	Real Madrid	A	1–1	Fran Rico 6'	67,554	Juan Martínez Munuera (Valencian Community)
8	17 October 2016	20:45	Osasuna	H	2–3	Escalante 1', Sergi Enrich 45'	5,250	Melero López (Andalusia)
9	22 October 2016	13:00	Espanyol	A	3–3	Sergi Enrich 23', Diego Reyes 27' (o.g.), Kike G. 44'	17,330	Gil Manzano (Extremadura)
10	30 October 2016	12:00	Villarreal	H	2–1	N.E. Ramis 80', P. León 87'	4,678	Fernández Borbalán (Andalusia)
11	5 November 2016	20:45	Las Palmas	A	0–1		19,361	Del Cerro Grande (Community of Madrid)
12	19 November 2016	18:30	Celta Vigo	H	1–0	Fran Rico 9'	5,484	José Luis Munuera Montero (Andalusia)
13	25 November 2016	20:45	Real Betis	H	3–1	P. León 19', Sergi Enrich 23', Kike G. 90+2'	5,150	Ocón Arráiz (La Rioja)
14	4 December 2016	16:15	Athletic Bilbao	A	1–3	Sergi Enrich 70'	42,831	Estrada Fernández (Catalonia)
15	11 December 2016	12:00	Alavés	H	0–0		5,666	Trujillo Suárez (Canary Islands)
16	18 December 2016	16:15	Leganés	A	1–1	Bebé 76'	8,392	González González (Castile-León)
17	7 January 2017	16:15	Atlético Madrid	H	0–2		5,780	Gil Manzano (Extremadura)
18	16 January 2017	20:45	Sporting Gijón	A	3–2	Adrián 4' (pen.), P. León 21', A. Luna 23'	20,050	Fernández Borbalán (Andalusia)
19	22 January 2017	20:45	Barcelona	H	0–4		6,291	José María Sánchez Martínez (Murcia)
20	28 January 2017	18:30	Deportivo La Coruña	H	3–1	Adrián 4', Sergi Enrich 15', Lejeune 72'	5,694	Juan Martínez Munuera (Valencian Community)
21	4 February 2017	20:45	Valencia	A	4–0	Sergi Enrich 28', 77', Adrián 45' (pen.), Dani García 57'	32,571	José Luis Munuera Montero (Andalusia)
22	13 February 2017	20:45	Granada	H	4–0	Adrián 11' (pen.), Sergi Enrich 39', N.E. Ramis 52', P. León 62'	4,855	Mateu Lahoz (Valencian Community)
23	18 February 2017	20:45	Sevilla	A	0–2		33,895	Álvarez Izquierdo (Catalonia)
24	25 February 2017	20:45	Málaga	H	3–0	Adrián 43', 50' (pen.), Sergi Enrich 52'	4,904	Estrada Fernández (Catalonia)
25	28 February 2017	19:30	Real Sociedad	A	2–2	Escalante 26', Lejeune (yellow card) 13' (yellow-red card) 46', P. León 90+3'	20,189	Undiano Mallenco (Navarre)
26	4 March 2017	16:15	Real Madrid	H	1–4	Rubén Peña 72'	6,694	González González (Castile-León)
27	13 March 2017	20:45	Osasuna	A	1–1	Kike G. 72'	11,332	Jaime Latre (Aragon)
28	18 March 2017	13:00	Espanyol	H	1–1	Kike G. 20'	5,325	Fernández Borbalán (Andalusia)
29	1 April 2017	13:00	Villarreal	A	3–2	P. León 48' (pen.), Kike G. 54', Inui 77'	15,574	Ocón Arráiz (La Rioja)
30	6 April 2017	19:30	Las Palmas	H	3–1	Bebé 14', Artiles 24' (o.g.), Adrián 66' (pen.)	5,204	Iglesias Villanueva (Galicia)
31	9 April 2017	16:15	Celta Vigo	A	2–0	Kike G. 13', P. León 51'	15,566	José Luis Munuera Montero (Andalusia)
32	16 April 2017	18:30	Real Betis	A	0–2		28,881	Mateu Lahoz (Valencian Community)
33	24 April 2017	20:45	Athletic Bilbao	H	0–1		6,543	Del Cerro Grande (Community of Madrid)
34	27 April 2017	19:30	Alavés	A	0–0		13,519	Álvarez Izquierdo (Catalonia)
35	30 April 2017	18:30	Leganés	H	2–0	Kike G. 62', Sergi Enrich 66'	5,256	Trujillo Suárez (Canary Islands)
36	6 May 2017	16:15	Atlético Madrid	A	1–0		46,699	Fernández Borbalán (Andalusia)
37	14 May 2017	20:00	Sporting Gijón	H	0–1		5,577	Juan Martínez Munuera (Valencian Community)
38	21 May 2017	20:00	Barcelona	A	2–4	Inui 7', 61', Capa (yellow card) 30' (yellow-red card) 74'	73,093	Hernández Hernández (Las Palmas)

=== Copa del Rey ===
Kickoff times are in CET or CEST.

Win Draw Loss

Round	Date	Time	Opponent	H/A	Score	Scorer	Attendance	Referee	Aggregate
Round of 32 (First leg)	29 November 2016	21:00	Sporting Gijón	A	2–1	Bebé 2', R. Peña 89'	11,806	José María Sánchez Martínez (Murcia)	5–2
Round of 32 (Second leg)	21 December 2016	19:00	Sporting Gijón	H	3–1	Kike G. 1', 46', Adrián 44'	4,085	Gil Manzano (Extremadura)	5–2
Round of 16 (First leg)	3 January 2017	19:00	Osasuna	A	3–0	Nano 28', Bebé 75', Adrián 90'	12,651	González González (Castile-León)	3–0
Round of 16 (Second leg)	12 January 2017	19:00	Osasuna	H	0–0		3,627	Jaime Latre (Aragon)	3–0
Quarter-finals (First leg)	19 January 2017	19:15	Atlético Madrid	A	0–3		24,826	Mateu Lahoz (Valencian Community)	2–5
Quarter-finals (Second leg)	25 January 2017	19:15	Atlético Madrid	H	2–2	Sergi Enrich 73', P. León 80'	4,000	Jaime Latre (Aragon)	2–5
