= 2015–16 SD Eibar season =

Eibar
2015–16 season
- President: Alex Aranzábal
- Head coach: José Luis Mendilibar
- Stadium: Ipurua
- La Liga: 14th
- Copa del Rey: Round of 16
- Top goalscorer: League: Borja Bastón (18); All: Borja Bastón (19)
- Highest home attendance: 6,100 vs Real Madrid (29 November 2015)
- Lowest home attendance: 3,061 vs Celtic (18 July 2015)
- Average home league attendance: 4,990 (includes 75th Anniv.)
Home colours	Away colours	Third colours

The 2015–16 season was Eibar's 2nd season in La Liga and 75th season in professional football. Eibar was reinstated to the first division even though they finished 18th and subsequently relegated during the 2014–15 season, due to Elche's administrative relegation by the Liga de Fútbol Profesional (LFP).

== Season ==
Thanks to their 2014 promotion and subsequent stay in La Liga, the club was able to expand the sitting of their stadium with the approval of the Eibar City Council. The addition of approximately 1,200 seats to the new North End raised the capacity to 6,267 of the stadium. For the new season, Eibar changed kits supplier from Hummel to Puma along with a new shirt sponsorship deal with Swiss oil company AVIA International.

On 18 July 2015, Eibar played its 75th-anniversary game against Scottish club Celtic in Ipurua (1–4). This included an inaugural ceremony on the pitch with a parade of 19th century clothed basque soldiers with a Saltire and bagpipes playing Scotland the Brave, with officials from both clubs shooting a 350 kg 19th century cannon. Eibar stated that they invited Celtic as their opponent for the game due to the strong connection between the Basque Country and Scotland, and also due to the Scottish presence in Eibar through the years (the main supporter group is named "Eskozia la Brava", meaning "Scotland the Brave").

After their opening weekend victory over Granada at Los Carmenes, Eibar lead La Liga's league table for the first time in their 75 years history. On 26 August, Eibar made official the transfer of Japanese international Takashi Inui from Bundesliga club Eintracht Frankfurt. The reported fee of 0.3 million euros is the most expensive transfer in Eibar's history. In response to the 2015 European migrant crisis, Eibar released a statement appealing to different government agencies, including the European Union, Government of Spain and Basque Government to find humanitarian solutions to this crisis. Eibar also pledged to donate 5 euros to the United Nations High Commissioner for Refugees (UNHCR) for every ticket sold to their home match against Atlético Madrid.

== Squad ==
=== Team statistics ===
Number	Position	Name	Age	Since	La Liga					Copa del Rey					Signed from	Notes
Number	Position	Name	Age	Since	Apps	Mins	Goal	Booked	Sent off (straight red)	Apps	Mins	Goal	Booked	Sent off (straight red)	Signed from	Notes
Goalkeepers
1	GK	(Spain) Xabi Irureta	40	2009	4	360	0	0	0	4	540	0	2	0	Real Unión
13	GK	(Spain) Asier Riesgo	42	2015	34	3060	0	1	0	0	0	0	0	0	Osasuna
25	GK	(Spain) Jaime Jimenez	45	2014	0	0	0	0	0	0	0	0	0	0	Real Valladolid
Defenders
2	CB	(Spain) Ion Ansotegi	44	2016	8	542	0	0	0	0	0	0	0	0	Real Sociedad
3	CB	(Serbia) Aleksandar Pantić	34	2015	20	1677	0	6	0	3	206	0	0	0	Villarreal (on loan)
4	CB	(Spain) Iván Ramis	41	2015	23	1794	0	8	1	2	154	0	1	0	Levante
15	CB	(Argentina) Mauro dos Santos	37	2015	31	2682	0	7	0	2	180	0	1	0	Almería
16	FB	(Spain) Lillo	37	2013	10	549	0	5	1	3	170	0	1	0	Alcoyano
17	LB	(Spain) David Juncà	32	2015	31	2335	0	8	0	2	163	0	0	0	Girona
19	LB	(Spain) Antonio Luna	35	2015	15	1001	0	2	0	3	197	0	2	0	(England) Aston Villa
23	CB	(Spain) Borja Ekiza	38	2014	4	188	0	1	0	3	270	0	0	0	Athletic Bilbao
33	CB	(Spain) Imanol Corral	32	2016	1	1	0	0	0	0	0	0	0	0	Youth system
Midfielders
5	MF	(Argentina) Gonzalo Escalante	33	2015	34	2829	3	15	0	2	160	0	0	1	(Italy) Catania
6	DM	(Croatia) Josip Radošević	32	2016	8	405	0	2	1	0	0	0	0	0	(Italy) Napoli (on loan)
7	MF	(Spain) Ander Capa (vice-captain)	34	2012	36	3122	2	12	0	1	90	0	0	0	Youth system
8	AM	(Japan) Takashi Inui	38	2015	27	1627	3	1	0	2	135	0	0	0	(Germany) Eintracht Frankfurt
11	MF	(Bosnia and Herzegovina) Izet Hajrović	35	2015	7	174	0	0	0	2	172	1	0	1	(Germany) Werder Bremen (on loan)
14	MF	(Spain) Dani García (captain)	36	2014	35	3056	0	15	0	0	0	0	0	0	Real Sociedad
20	MF	(Spain) Keko Gontán	34	2015	29	2315	3	5	1	3	145	0	0	0	Albacete
22	AM	(Spain) Jota	35	2016	13	689	0	1	0	0	0	0	0	0	(England) Brentford (on loan)
24	MF	(Spain) Adrián González	38	2015	32	2230	5	6	0	4	305	0	0	0	Elche
28	MF	(Spain) Iñigo Barrenetxea	32	2015	1	2	0	0	0	2	135	0	0	0	Youth system
29	MF	(Spain) Asier Etxaburu	32	2015	0	0	0	0	0	1	46	0	0	0	Youth system
Forwards
9	FW	(Spain) Sergi Enrich	36	2015	38	2420	9	4	0	3	162	2	0	0	Numancia
18	FW	(Spain) Borja Bastón	34	2015	36	2577	18	3	0	3	180	1	1	0	Atlético Madrid (on loan)
21	FW	(Spain) Saúl Berjón	40	2014	29	1400	4	1	0	2	180	1	0	0	Real Murcia
Departed during season
–	CF	(Spain) Mikel Arruabarrena	43	2009	6	56	1	0	0	2	180	1	0	0	(Poland) Legia Warsaw
–	AM	(Azerbaijan) Eddy Israfilov	34	2015	6	207	0	2	0	3	170	0	1	0	Real Murcia (on loan)
–	FW	(Italy) Simone Verdi	34	2015	9	290	0	2	0	4	315	1	0	0	(Italy) Milan (on loan)

Last updated: 1 June 2016
Source: First Team Statistics

=== From youth squad ===
Note: Flags indicate national team as defined under FIFA eligibility rules; some limited exceptions apply. Players may hold more than one non-FIFA nationality.

No.	Pos.	Nation	Player
26	MF	ESP	Thaylor Lubanzadio
28	MF	ESP	Iñigo Barrenetxea
29	MF	ESP	Asier Etxaburu
30	GK	ESP	Jorge Mediavilla

No.	Pos.	Nation	Player
33	DF	ESP	Imanol Corral
–	MF	ESP	Ander Gayoso
–	FW	ESP	Endika Arandilla

=== Technical staff ===
Position	Name
First team head coach	José Luis Mendilibar
Assistant coach	Iñaki Bea
Fitness coach	Toni Ruiz
Fitness coach	Alain Gandiaga
Goalkeeping coach	Josu Anuzita
Physiotherapist	Manu Sánchez
Physiotherapist	Unai Ormazabal
Doctor	Ostaiska Egia
Team liaison	German Andueza

Last updated: 29 July 2014
Source: SD Eibar

=== Transfers ===
==== Out ====
Number	Position	Name	Age	Moving to	Type	Transfer window	Source
2	RB	(Spain) Eneko Boveda	26	Athletic Bilbao	End of contract	Summer
22	CB	(Spain) Raúl Navas	27	Real Sociedad	Loan return	Summer
24	LB	(Spain) Abraham Minero	29	Real Zaragoza	Loan return	Summer
20	CF	(Spain) Manu del Moral	31	Sevilla	Loan return	Summer
19	CF	(Italy) Federico Piovaccari	30	(Italy) Sampdoria	Loan return	Summer
17	CB	(Spain) Dídac Vilà	26	(Italy) Milan	Loan return	Summer
–	CB	(Spain) Rafael Páez	20	(England) Liverpool	Loan return	Summer
13	GK	(Spain) Txusta	29	Real Unión	End of contract	Summer
4	DM	(Spain) Txema Añibarro	35	Retired		Summer
18	DM	(Ghana) Derek Boateng	32		End of contract	Summer
12	DM	(Spain) Borja Fernández	34	(India) Atlético de Kolkata	End of contract	Summer
9	CF	(Spain) Ángel	28	Real Zaragoza	End of contract	Summer
15	CF	(Serbia) Dejan Lekić	30	(India) Atlético de Kolkata	End of contract	Summer
–	MF	(Spain) Sergio García	25	Real Murcia	Loan	Summer
–	MF	(Spain) Aitor Ortega	23	Barakaldo	Loan	Summer
–	FW	(Spain) Julen Iriarte	23	Real Unión	Loan	Summer
11	MF	(Spain) Dani Nieto	24	(Greece) Skoda Xanthi	Contract termination	Summer
8	DM	(Spain) Jon Errasti	27	(Italy) Spezia	Contract termination	Summer
5	MF	(Argentina) Gonzalo Escalante	22	(Italy) Catania	Loan return	Winter
10	CF	(Spain) Mikel Arruabarrena	32	Huesca	Loan	Winter
9	FW	(Italy) Simone Verdi	23	(Italy) Milan	Loan return	Winter
6	AM	(Azerbaijan) Eddy Israfilov	23	Real Murcia	Loan return	Winter

==== In ====
Number	Position	Name	Age	Moving from	Type	Transfer window	Source
–	MF	(Spain) Ander Gayoso	21	Barakaldo	Loan return	Summer
–	AM	(Spain) Aitor Ortega	22	Amorebieta	Loan return	Summer
–	CF	(Spain) Julen Iriarte	23	Mallorca B	Loan return	Summer
–	LB	(Spain) Antonio Luna	24	(England) Aston Villa	Transfer	Summer	SDEibar.com
–	AM	(Azerbaijan) Eddy Pascual	22	Real Murcia	Loan	Summer	SDEibar.com
–	MF	(Spain) Keko Gontán	23	Albacete	Transfer	Summer	SDEibar.com
–	MF	(Spain) Sergio García	25	Leioa	Transfer	Summer	SDEibar.com
–	MF	(Argentina) Gonzalo Escalante	22	(Italy) Catania	Loan	Summer	SDEibar.com
–	FW	(Spain) Sergi Enrich	25	Numancia	Transfer	Summer	SDEibar.com
–	FW	(Spain) Thaylor Lubazandio	21	Celta Vigo B	Transfer	Summer	SDEibar.com
–	CB	(Spain) Iván Ramis	30	Levante	Transfer	Summer	SDEibar.com
–	CB	(Argentina) Mauro dos Santos	26	Almería	Transfer	Summer	SDEibar.com
–	GK	(Spain) Asier Riesgo	31	Osasuna	Transfer	Summer	SDEibar.com
–	LB	(Spain) David Juncà	21	Girona	Transfer	Summer	SDEibar.com
–	FW	(Spain) Borja Bastón	22	Atlético Madrid	Loan	Summer	SDEibar.com
–	MF	(Spain) Adrián González	27	Elche	Transfer	Summer	SDEibar.com
–	FW	(Italy) Simone Verdi	23	(Italy) Milan	Loan	Summer	SDEibar.com
–	CB	(Serbia) Aleksandar Pantić	23	Villarreal	Loan	Summer	SDEibar.com
–	AM	(Japan) Takashi Inui	27	(Germany) Eintracht Frankfurt	Transfer	Summer	SDEibar.com
–	MF	(Bosnia and Herzegovina) Izet Hajrović	24	(Germany) Werder Bremen	Loan	Summer	SDEibar.com
5	MF	(Argentina) Gonzalo Escalante	22	(Italy) Catania	Transfer	Winter	SDEibar.com
–	AM	(Spain) Jota	24	(England) Brentford	Loan	Winter	SDEibar.com
–	CB	(Spain) Ion Ansotegi	33	Real Sociedad	Transfer	Winter	SDEibar.com
–	DM	(Croatia) Josip Radošević	21	(Italy) Napoli	Loan	Winter	SDEibar.com

== Competitions ==
=== Overall ===
Competition	Started round	Current position/round	Final position	First match	Last match
La Liga	—	—	14th	24 August 2015	15 May 2016
Copa del Rey	Round of 32	—	Round of 16	2 December 2016	13 January 2016

=== Record ===
Competition	Record							
Competition	Pld	W	D	L	GF	GA	GD	Win %
La Liga	38	11	10	17	49	61	−12	28.95
Copa del Rey	4	1	0	3	8	9	−1	25.00
Total	42	12	10	20	57	70	−13	28.57

Last updated: 1 June 2016
Source: Competitions

=== Friendlies ===
Kickoff times are in CET.

Win Draw Loss

Round	Date	Time	Opponent	H/A	Score	Scorer	Attendance	Referee
75th Anniversary	18 July 2015	19:00	(Scotland) Celtic	H	1–4	Arruabarrena 67' (pen.)	3,061	Bikandi Garrido (Basque Country)
Pre-season	23 July 2015	19:30	Logroñés	A	1–0	Arruabarrena 84'	1,500	César Soto (Castile-La Mancha)
Pre-season	24 July 2015	19:00	Real Unión	N	3–1	Keko Gontán 3', Dani Nieto 84', 89'	500	Ibai Rezola (Basque Country)
Pre-season	30 July 2015	19:00	Mirandés	N	0–0		600
Pre-season	31 July 2015	19:00	Osasuna	N	0–1		1,000	Fermín Lampreabe (Navarre)
Pre-season	6 August 2015	20:00	Mensajero	N	1–1 (4–2p)	Endika 22'	300	Christian Gadella (Canary Islands).
XLV Teide Trophy	7 August 2015	21:00	Tenerife	N	1–1 (2–4p)	Saúl Berjón 43'	2,000	Daniel Trujillo (Canary Islands)
Pre-season	12 August 2015	20:30	Numancia	A	2–0	Borja 44', Sergi Enrich 89'	2,032	De la Fuente Ramos (Castile and León)
City of Valladolid Trophy	15 August 2015	20:30	Real Valladolid	A	0–1		3,289	Valdés Aller (Castile and León)
Friendly	3 September 2015	19:00	Sporting Gijón	N	0–1		400	Ander González (Basque Country)
Friendly	9 October 2015	19:30	(France) Bordeaux	N	5–0	Arruabarrena 10', 66', Sergi Enrich 46', Saúl Berjón 62'; Keko Gontán 75'
Friendly	12 November 2015	19:00	(France) Toulouse	N	3–1	Sergi Enrich 33', Thaylor 57', Arruabarrena 79'		Saïd Ennjimi (France)

=== Primera División ===
==== League table ====
Pos	Team	Pld	W	D	L	GF	GA	GD	Pts
12	Valencia	38	11	11	16	46	48	−2	44 (Note: Las Palmas finished ahead of Valencia on head-to-head record; Valencia 1–1 Las Palmas, Las Palmas 2–1 Valencia.)
13	Espanyol	38	12	7	19	40	74	−34	43 (Note: Espanyol finished ahead of Eibar on head-to-head goal difference; Eibar 2–1 Espanyol, Espanyol 4–2 Eibar.)
14	Eibar	38	11	10	17	49	61	−12	43
15	Deportivo La Coruña	38	8	18	12	45	61	−16	42
16	Granada	38	10	9	19	46	69	−23	39 (Note: Granada finished ahead of Sporting Gijón on head-to-head record; Granada 2–0 Sporting Gijón, Sporting Gijón 3–3 Granada.)

Source: La Liga, Soccerway
Rules for classification: 1) Points; 2) Head-to-head points; 3) Head-to-head goal difference; 4) Goal difference; 5) Goals scored; 6) Fair-play points; 7) Play-off.

==== Results summary ====
Overall								Home						Away					
Pld	W	D	L	GF	GA	GD	Pts	W	D	L	GF	GA	GD	W	D	L	GF	GA	GD
38	11	10	17	49	51	−2	43	8	5	6	26	22	+4	3	5	11	23	29	−6

Last updated: 1 June 2016.
Source: SDEibar.com

==== Result round by round ====
Round	1	2	3	4	5	6	7	8	9	10	11	12	13	14	15	16	17	18	19	20	21	22	23	24	25	26	27	28	29	30	31	32	33	34	35	36	37	38
Ground	A	H	A	H	A	H	A	H	A	H	H	A	H	A	H	A	H	A	H	H	A	H	A	H	A	H	A	H	A	A	H	A	H	A	H	A	H	A
Result	W	W	D	L	D	D	W	D	L	W	W	D	L	L	D	L	W	W	W	W	L	L	L	W	L	L	L	L	D	D	L	L	W	L	D	L	D	L
Position	1	2	5	6	8	7	7	7	7	6	6	6	8	9	10	11	8	8	6	6	6	8	8	6	7	7	8	8	8	8	9	12	10	11	11	12	12	14

Updated to match(es) played on 1 June 2016. Source: League matches
A = Away; H = Home; W = Win; D = Draw; L = Loss

==== Matches ====
Kickoff times are in CET and CEST.

Win Draw Loss

Round	Date	Time	Opponent	H/A	Score	Scorer	Attendance	Referee
1	24 August 2015	20:30	Granada	A	3–1	Adrián 22', Escalante 35', Arruabarrena 67'	14,833	Iglesias Villanueva (Galicia)
2	30 August 2015	18:30	Athletic Bilbao	H	2–0	Saúl Berjón 34' (pen.), Adrián 62'	5,511	Fernández Borbalán (Andalusia)
3	13 September 2015	20:30	Málaga	A	0–0		19,937	Undiano Mallenco (Navarre)
4	19 September 2015	20:30	Atlético Madrid	H	0–2		5,128	Hernández Hernández (Canary Islands)
5	23 September 2015	20:00	Levante	A	2–2	Borja 10', 48'	11,013	Velasco Carballo (Community of Madrid)
6	26 September 2015	22:00	Celta Vigo	H	1–1	Borja 3'	4,862	Pérez Montero (Andalusia)
7	3 October 2015	22:00	Las Palmas	A	2–0	Saúl Berjón 7', Borja 62'	18,506	Mateu Lahoz (Valencian Community)
8	17 October 2015	18:00	Sevilla	H	1–1	Borja 9'	5,462	Juan Martínez Munuera (Valencian Community)
9	25 October 2015	18:00	Barcelona	A	1–3	Borja 10'	76,622	Del Cerro Grande (Community of Madrid)
10	1 November 2015	12:00	Rayo Vallecano	H	1–0	Llorente 21' (o.g.)	5,363	Álvarez Izquierdo (Catalonia)
11	7 November 2015	20:30	Getafe	H	3–1	Sergi Enrich 16', 29', Saúl Berjón 61'	5,333	Iglesias Villanueva (Galicia)
12	22 November 2015	16:00	Villarreal	A	1–1	Sergi Enrich 27', Dani García (penalty missed)	16,770	Prieto Iglesias (Navarre)
13	29 November 2015	16:00	Real Madrid	H	0–2		5,892	Gil Manzano (Community of Madrid)
14	6 December 2015	12:00	Real Sociedad	A	1–2	Borja 4'	23,461	Melero López (Andalusia)
15	13 December 2015	16:00	Valencia	H	1–1	Sergi Enrich 45', Saúl Berjón (penalty missed) , N.E. Ramis (red card) 90+2'	5,182	González González (Castile-León)
16	19 December 2015	22:05	Deportivo La Coruña	A	0–2		19,281	Estrada Fernández (Catalan)
17	30 December 2015	18:30	Sporting Gijón	H	2–0	Keko Gontán 55', Borja 62'	5,471	Velasco Carballo (Community of Madrid)
18	4 January 2016	20:30	Real Betis	A	4–0	Capa 3', Keko Gontán 17', Adrián 71', Borja 82'	33,609	Prieto Iglesias (Navarre)
19	10 January 2016	18:15	Espanyol	H	2–1	Inui 15', Borja 74' (pen.)	4,587	Jaime Latre (Aragon)
20	18 January 2016	20:30	Granada	H	5–1	Inui 35', Sergi Enrich 38', 68', Borja 74', 79'	4,215	José María Sánchez Martínez (Murcia)
21	24 January 2016	12:00	Athletic Bilbao	A	2–5	Borja 4', 50' (pen.)	43,557	Gil Manzano (Community of Madrid)
22	30 January 2016	18:15	Málaga	H	1–2	Borja 90+4'	5,249	Mateu Lahoz (Valencian Community)
23	6 February 2016	16:00	Atlético Madrid	A	1–3	Keko 46'	45,321	Fernández Borbalán (Andalusia)
24	14 February 2016	18:15	Levante	H	2–0	Borja 37', Adrián 58'	4,766	Estrada Fernández (Catalonia)
25	20 February 2016	22:05	Celta Vigo	A	2–3	Saúl Berjón 84' (pen.), Inui 87'	14,725	Melero López (Andalusia)
26	26 February 2016	20:30	Las Palmas	H	0–1		5,112	Pérez Montero (Andalusia)
27	2 March 2016	20:00	Sevilla	A	0–1		29,627	Juan Martínez Munuera (Valencian Community)
28	6 March 2016	16:00	Barcelona	H	0–4		6,100	Undiano Mallenco (Navarre)
29	12 March 2016	22:05	Rayo Vallecano	A	1–1	Escalante 36'	10,567	Álvarez Izquierdo (Catalonia)
30	18 March 2016	20:30	Getafe	A	1–1	Borja 87'	6,557	Iglesias Villanueva (Galicia)
31	3 April 2016	18:15	Villarreal	H	1–2	Capa 22'	5,183	Del Cerro Grande (Community of Madrid)
32	10 April 2016	16:00	Real Madrid	A	0–4		70,689	José María Sánchez Martínez (Murcia)
33	17 April 2016	20:30	Real Sociedad	H	2–1	Sergi Enrich 32', Escalante 58'	5,801	Melero López (Andalusia)
34	20 April 2016	20:45	Valencia	A	0–4		34,376	Estrada Fernández (Catalonia)
35	23 April 2016	22:05	Deportivo La Coruña	H	1–1	Adrián 8'	4,606	Prieto Iglesias (Navarre)
36	29 April 2016	20:30	Sporting Gijón	A	0–2		25,436	Hernández Hernández (Canary Islands)
37	8 May 2016	17:00	Real Betis	H	1–1	Sergi Enrich 73'	5,168	Juan Martínez Munuera (Valencian Community)
38	15 May 2016	19:00	Espanyol	A	2–4	Borja 57' (pen.), Sergi Enrich 90'	13,307	Melero López (Andalusia)

==== Results overview ====
Win Draw Loss

Region	Team	Home score	Away score
(Andalusia)	Granada	5–1	1–3
(Andalusia)	Málaga	1–2	0–0
(Andalusia)	Real Betis	1–1	0–4
(Andalusia)	Sevilla	1–1	0–1
(Community of Madrid)	Atlético Madrid	0–2	1–3
(Community of Madrid)	Getafe	3–1	1–1
(Community of Madrid)	Rayo Vallecano	1–0	1–1
(Community of Madrid)	Real Madrid	0–2	4-0
(Valencian Community)	Levante	2–0	2–2
(Valencian Community)	Valencia	1–1	4-0
(Valencian Community)	Villarreal	1–2	1–1
(Basque Country (autonomous community))	Athletic Bilbao	2–0	5–2
(Basque Country (autonomous community))	Real Sociedad	2–1	2–1
(Catalonia)	Barcelona	0-4	3–1
(Catalonia)	Espanyol	2–1	4–2
(Galicia (Spain))	Celta Vigo	1–1	3–2
(Galicia (Spain))	Deportivo La Coruña	1–1	2–0
(Canary Islands)	Las Palmas	0–1	0–2
(Asturias)	Sporting Gijón	2–0	2–0

=== Copa del Rey ===
Kickoff times are in CET and CEST.

Win Draw Loss

Round	Date	Time	Opponent	H/A	Score	Scorer	Attendance	Referee
Round of 32 (First leg)	3 December 2015	21:00	Ponferradina	A	0–3		3,889	Jaime Latre (Aragon)
Round of 32 (Second leg)	16 December 2015	20:00	Ponferradina	H	4–0 (4–3 agg.)	Borja 45+2', Sergi Enrich 62', Verdi 73', Arruabarrena 85' (pen.)	3,079	Clos Gómez (Aragon)
Round of 16 (First leg)	7 January 2016	20:30	Las Palmas	H	2–3	Hajrović 10', (red card) 82', Saúl Berjón 20', Escalante (red card) 86'	4,536	Álvarez Izquierdo (Catalonia)
Round of 16 (Second leg)	13 January 2016	21:00	Las Palmas	A	2–3 (4–6 agg.)	Ekiza 52', Sergi Enrich 53'	13,588	Pérez Montero (Andalusia)
