= 2017–18 SD Eibar season =

SD Eibar
2017–18 season
- President: Amaia Gorostiza
- Head coach: José Luis Mendilibar
- Stadium: Ipurua
- La Liga: 9th
- Copa del Rey: Round of 32
- Top goalscorer: League: Charles; Kike (8); All: Charles; Kike (8)
- Highest home attendance: 5,948 vs Athletic Bilbao
- Lowest home attendance: 4,341 vs Betis
- Average home league attendance: 4,442
Home colours	Away colours	Third colours

During the 2017–18 season, SD Eibar participated in the Spanish La Liga and the Copa del Rey.

== Squad ==
As of 2 September 2017

Note: Flags indicate national team as defined under FIFA eligibility rules; some limited exceptions apply. Players may hold more than one non-FIFA nationality.

No.	Pos.	Nation	Player
1	GK	ESP	Yoel
2	MF	CHI	Fabián Orellana (on loan from Valencia)
3	MF	SEN	Pape Diop
4	DF	ESP	Iván Ramis (4th captain)
5	MF	ARG	Gonzalo Escalante
7	DF	ESP	Ander Capa (2nd captain)
8	MF	JPN	Takashi Inui
9	FW	ESP	Sergi Enrich
10	FW	POR	Bebé
11	MF	ESP	Rubén Peña
12	DF	POR	Paulo Oliveira
13	GK	ESP	Asier Riesgo (3rd captain)

No.	Pos.	Nation	Player
14	MF	ESP	Dani García (captain)
15	DF	ESP	José Ángel
16	MF	ESP	Fran Rico (on loan from Granada)
17	FW	ESP	Kike
18	DF	ESP	Anaitz Arbilla
19	FW	BRA	Charles
20	MF	ESP	Iván Alejo
21	MF	ESP	Pedro León
22	DF	ESP	David Lombán
23	DF	ESP	David Juncà
24	MF	ESP	Joan Jordán
25	GK	SRB	Marko Dmitrović

== Transfers ==
=== In ===
Date	Player	From	Type	Fee	Ref
23 May 2017	(Spain) Yoel	Valencia	Transfer	€750,000	
14 June 2017	(Spain) Iván Alejo	Alcorcón	Transfer	€300,000	
23 June 2017	(Serbia) Marko Dmitrović	Alcorcón	Transfer	€1,000,000	
30 June 2017	(Spain) Pere Milla	UCAM Murcia	Loan return	Free	
30 June 2017	(Spain) Unai Elgezabal	Alcorcón	Loan return	Free	
30 June 2017	(Spain) Jordi Calavera	Lugo	Loan return	Free	
30 June 2017	(Spain) Iñigo Barrenetxea	Sestao	Loan return	Free	
30 June 2017	(Spain) Jon Ander	Llagostera	Loan return	Free	
30 June 2017	(Spain) Jon Ander Amelibia	Logroñés	Loan return	Free	
30 June 2017	(Spain) Sergio García	Logroñés	Loan return	Free	
30 June 2017	(Spain) Juanfran	Logroñés	Loan return	Free	
30 June 2017	(Spain) Thaylor	Real Unión	Loan return	Free	
30 June 2017	(Spain) Roger Escoruela	Real Unión	Loan return	Free	
4 July 2017	(Brazil) Charles	Málaga	Transfer	Free	
5 July 2017	(Spain) Pablo Hervías	Real Sociedad	Transfer	Free	
13 July 2017	(Spain) Joan Jordán	Espanyol	Transfer	€100,000	
14 July 2017	(Spain) José Ángel	(Portugal) Porto	Transfer	Free	
17 July 2017	(Portugal) Paulo Oliveira	(Portugal) Sporting CP	Transfer	€3,500,000	
1 September 2017	(Spain) David Lombán	Granada	Signed	Free	
1 December 2017	(Chile) Fabián Orellana	Valencia	Loan	Free	
2 January 2018	(Senegal) Pape Diop	Espanyol	Free transfer	Free	

=== Out ===
Date	Player	To	Type	Fee	Ref
23 May 2017	(Spain) Adrián	Málaga	Transfer	Free	
8 June 2017	(Spain) Antonio Luna	Levante	Transfer	Free	
1 July 2017	(Spain) Thaylor	Caudal Deportivo	Contract terminated	Free	
4 July 2017	(France) Florian Lejeune	(England) Newcastle United	Transfer	€10,000,000	
6 July 2017	(Spain) Pere Milla	Numancia	Loan	Free	
7 July 2017	(Spain) Sergio García	Barakaldo	Transfer	Free	
11 July 2017	(Argentina) Mauro dos Santos	Leganés	Transfer	Free	
12 July 2017	(Spain) Pablo Hervías	Valladolid	Loan	Free	
18 July 2017	(Spain) Jon Ander Felipe	Toledo	Transfer	Free	
16 August 2017	(Spain) Unai Elgezabal	Numancia	Loan	Free	
29 August 2017	(Spain) Juanfran	Marbella	Transfer	Free	
29 August 2017	(Spain) Jordi Calavera	Sporting Gijón	Loan	Free	
1 September 2017	(Spain) Nano	Levante	Loan	Free	
1 January 2018	(Spain) Álex Gálvez	Las Palmas	Loan	Free	
11 January 2018	(Spain) Christian Rivera	Barcelona B	Loan	Free	

== Pre-season and friendlies ==
Team 1	Score	Team 2
Real Unión (Spain)	1–3	(Spain) Eibar
Eibar (Spain)	4–0	(Spain) Barakaldo
Watford (England)	1–0	(Spain) Eibar
Eibar (Spain)	4–2	(England) Leeds United
Eibar (Spain)	3–1	(Turkey) Antalyaspor
Eibar (Spain)	0–1	(Germany) Schalke 04
Sporting Gijón (Spain)	3–2	(Spain) Eibar
Eibar (Spain)	1–0	(Spain) Oviedo
Osasuna (Spain)	2–0	(Spain) Eibar
Zaragoza (Spain)	0–2	(Spain) Eibar
Bordeaux (France)	0–0	(Spain) Eibar
Eibar (Spain)	0–2	(Spain) Leganés

== Competitions ==
=== Overall ===
Competition	Started round	First match	Current position/round	Last match	Final position/round
La Liga	–	21 August 2017	7th	20 May 2018	
Copa del Rey	Round of 32	25 October 2017		28 November 2017	Round of 32

=== Liga ===
==== League table ====
Pos	Team	Pld	W	D	L	GF	GA	GD	Pts	Qualification or relegation
7	Sevilla	38	17	7	14	49	58	−9	58	Qualification for the Europa League second qualifying round (Note: Since the winners of the 2017–18 Copa del Rey, Barcelona, qualified for European competition based on league position, the spot awarded to the cup winners (Europa League group stage) was passed to the sixth-placed team and the spot awarded to the sixth-placed team (Europa League second qualifying round) was passed to the seventh-placed team.)
8	Getafe	38	15	10	13	42	33	+9	55	
9	Eibar	38	14	9	15	44	50	−6	51 (Note: Eibar finished ahead of Girona on head-to-head points: Eibar 4–1 Girona, Girona 1–4 Eibar.)	
10	Girona	38	14	9	15	50	59	−9	51	
11	Espanyol	38	12	13	13	36	42	−6	49 (Note: Head-to-head points: Espanyol 8, Real Sociedad 4, Celta Vigo 4 (Espanyol 2–1 Real Sociedad, Real Sociedad 1–1 Espanyol, Espanyol 2–1 Celta Vigo, Celta Vigo 2–2 Espanyol, Real Sociedad 1–2 Celta Vigo, Celta Vigo 2–3 Real Sociedad).)	

Source: La Liga, Soccerway
Rules for classification: 1) Points; 2) Head-to-head points; 3) Head-to-head goal difference; 4) Goal difference; 5) Goals scored; 6) Fair-play points (Note: Head-to-head record is used only after all the matches between the teams in question have been played)

==== Results summary ====
Overall								Home						Away					
Pld	W	D	L	GF	GA	GD	Pts	W	D	L	GF	GA	GD	W	D	L	GF	GA	GD
21	8	5	8	26	33	−7	29	5	3	3	18	12	+6	3	2	5	8	21	−13

Last updated: 26 January 2018.
Source: SDEibar.com

==== Matches ====
Win Draw Loss Fixtures

21 August 2017 1	Málaga	0–1	Eibar	Málaga
22:00 CEST (UTC+02:00)	González (yellow card) 45'; Jony (yellow card) 90'	Report	Charles (yellow card) 3', (goal) 57'; Kike (yellow card) 32'; Alejo (yellow card) 83'	Stadium: La Rosaleda; Attendance: 24,838; Referee: David Medié Jiménez

27 August 2017 2	Eibar	0–1	Athletic Bilbao	Eibar
18:15 CEST (UTC+02:00)	Kike (yellow card) 25'; Jordán (yellow card) 49' (yellow-red card) 90+1'	Report	Aduriz 38'; Bóveda (yellow card) 81'	Stadium: Ipurua; Attendance: 5,948; Referee: José María Sánchez Martínez

9 September 2017 3	Sevilla	3–0	Eibar	Seville
18:30 CEST (UTC+02:00)	Escudero (yellow card) 3'; Ganso 46'; Ben Yedder 76'; Nolito 90+2'	Report	José Ángel (yellow card) 30'	Stadium: Ramón Sánchez Pizjuán; Attendance: 32,469; Referee: Antonio Mateu Lahoz

15 September 2017 4	Eibar	1–0	Leganés	Eibar
21:00 CEST (UTC+02:00)	García (yellow card) 43'; Oliveira (yellow card) 48'; Gálvez 53'	Report	Brašanac (yellow card) 3'; Dos Santos (yellow card) 25'; Rico (yellow card) 50'; Siovas (yellow card) 63'; Guerrero (yellow card) 66'	Stadium: Ipurua; Attendance: 4,986; Referee: Juan Martínez Munuera

19 September 2017 5	Barcelona	6–1	Eibar	Barcelona
22:00 CEST	Messi 20' (pen.), 59', 62', 87'; Paulinho 38'; D. Suárez 53'	Report	Capa (yellow card) 10'; Enrich 57'; Gálvez (yellow card) 80'	Stadium: Camp Nou; Attendance: 51,645; Referee: Alejandro Hernández Hernández

24 September 2017 6	Eibar	0–4	Celta Vigo	Eibar
18:30 CEST (UTC+02:00)	Escalante (yellow card) 11'; García (yellow card) 28'	Report	Cabral 17', (yellow card) 18'; Sisto 23'; Hernández 39'; Wass 72'	Stadium: Ipurua; Attendance: 5,345; Referee: David Fernández Borbalán

1 October 2017 7	Villarreal	3–0	Eibar	Villarreal
18:30 CEST (UTC+02:00)	Bakambu 25', 52', 76' (pen.); Rodri (yellow card) 31'; Álvaro (yellow card) 47'	Report	García (yellow card) 50'	Stadium: La Cerámica; Attendance: 17,090; Referee: Melero López

15 October 2017 8	Eibar	0–0	Deportivo La Coruña	Eibar
12:00 CEST (UTC+02:00)	Arbilla (yellow card) 38'; García (yellow card) 56'	Report	Çolak (yellow card) 56'; Borges (yellow card) 79'	Stadium: Ipurua; Attendance: 5,125; Referee: Santiago Jaime Latre

22 October 2017 9	Real Madrid	3–0	Eibar	Madrid
20:45	Oliveira 18' (o.g.); Casemiro (yellow card) 23'; Asensio 28'; Marcelo 82'	Report	Charles (yellow card) 24'	Stadium: Santiago Bernabéu; Attendance: 63,705; Referee: Alfonso Álvarez Izquierdo

29 October 2017 10	Eibar	2–2	Levante	Eibar
18:30 CEST (UTC+02:00)	Arbilla 51'; Charles 74'	Report	Morales 35'; Bardhi 37'	Stadium: Ipurua; Attendance: 5,098; Referee: Javier Alberola Rojas

5 November 2017 11	Real Sociedad	3–1	Eibar	San Sebastián
18:30 CET (UTC+01:00)	Willian José 12'; Januzaj 28'; Oyarzabal 46'	Report	Lombán (yellow card) 23'; Arbilla (yellow card) 68'; Jordán 72'; Sarriegi (yellow card) 81'	Stadium: Anoeta; Attendance: 20,328; Referee: Daniel Trujillo Suárez

20 November 2017 12	Eibar	5–0	Real Betis	Eibar
21:00 CET (UTC+01:00)	Amat 6' (o.g.); Escalante (yellow card) 22', (goal) 30'; Arbilla (yellow card) 37'; Charles 56' (pen.), 71'; Enrich 80'	Report	Amat (yellow card) 11'; Mandi (red card) 55'; Guardado (yellow card) 63'	Stadium: Ipurua; Attendance: 4,341; Referee: José González González

25 November 2017 13	Alavés	1–2	Eibar	Vitoria-Gasteiz
13:00 CET (UTC+01:00)	Santos (yellow card) 24' (yellow-red card) 45'; Ely (yellow card) 37'; Munir (yellow card) 45'; Vigaray (yellow card) 71'; M. García (yellow card) 75'; Pacheco (yellow card) 81'; Burgui 90+1'	Report	Jordán 33'; D. García (yellow card) 42'; Capa (yellow card) 45'; Juncà (yellow card) 67'; Charles 69', (red card) 83'	Stadium: Mendizorrotza; Attendance: 19,272; Referee: José Luis Munuera Montero

3 December 2017 14	Eibar	3–1	Espanyol	Eibar
18:30 CET (UTC+01:00)	Kike 9', (yellow card) 81'; Arbilla (yellow card) 31'; Inui (yellow card) 35'; Alejo 38'; Jordán 69' (pen.)	Report	Gerard (yellow card) 15'; D. López (yellow card) 67'; Enrich 79' (o.g.); Hermoso (yellow card) 89'	Stadium: Ipurua; Attendance: 4,693; Referee: Alberto Undiano Mallenco

9 December 2017 15	Getafe	0–0	Eibar	Getafe
13:00 CET (UTC+01:00)	Shibasaki (yellow card) 88'	Report	Inui (yellow card) 49'; García (yellow card) 81'; Alejo (yellow card) 84'; Enrich (yellow card) 90+2'	Stadium: Coliseum Alfonso Pérez; Attendance: 9,317; Referee: Javier Alberola Rojas

16 December 2017 16	Eibar	2–1	Valencia	Eibar
18:30 CET (UTC+01:00)	Inui 49'; García (yellow card) 65'; Jordán 87'	Report	Mina 57'; Kondogbia (yellow card) 71'; Parejo (yellow card) 76'; Pereira (yellow card) 80'; Lato (yellow card) 82'	Stadium: Ipurua; Attendance: 5,219; Referee: Pablo González Fuertes

21 December 2017 17	Eibar	4–1	Girona	Eibar
19:30 CET (UTC+01:00)	Inui 1', 54'; Charles 10'; García (yellow card) 25'; Jordán 90+2'	Report	Timor (yellow card) 13', (goal) 26'; Maffeo (yellow card) 30'	Stadium: Ipurua; Attendance: 4,867; Referee: Ignacio Iglesias Villanueva

6 January 2018 18	Las Palmas	1–2	Eibar	Las Palmas
18:30 CET (UTC+01:00)	Viera 32' (pen.); D. Castellano (yellow card) 42'; Toledo (yellow card) 57'; Lemos (yellow card) 63'	Report	Enrich (yellow card) 18', (goal) 77'; Arbilla (yellow card) 31'; Orellana 73'; Inui (yellow card) 84'	Stadium: Gran Canaria; Attendance: 12,059; Referee: José González González

13 January 2018 19	Eibar	0–1	Atlético Madrid	Eibar
18:30 CET (UTC+01:00)	Alejo (yellow card) 10'; Ramis (yellow card) 33'	Report	Gameiro 27'; Godín (yellow card) 73'	Stadium: Ipurua; Attendance: 6,172; Referee: Antonio Mateu Lahoz

22 January 2018 20	Eibar	1–1	Málaga	Eibar
21:00 CET (UTC+01:00)	Kike 76'; Orellana (yellow card) 89'	Report	En-Nesyri 16'; Ricca (yellow card) 44'; Kuzmanović (yellow card) 90+1' (yellow-red card) 90+2'	Stadium: Ipurua; Attendance: 4,514; Referee: David Medié Jiménez

26 January 2018 21	Athletic Bilbao	1–1	Eibar	Bilbao
21:00 CET (UTC+01:00)	Aduriz 50'	Report	Kike 73'	Stadium: San Mamés; Attendance: 39,440; Referee: Mario Melero López

3 February 2018 22	Eibar	5–1	Sevilla	Eibar
13:00 CET (UTC+01:00)	Kike 1'; Orellana 17', 61'; Ramis 32'; Arbilla 83'	Report	Sarabia 21' (pen.); Pareja (yellow card) 40'; Mesa (yellow card) 47'; Banega (yellow card) 67'	Stadium: Ipurua; Attendance: 5,311; Referee: Daniel Trujillo Suárez

10 February 2018 23	Leganés	0–1	Eibar	Leganés
18:30 CET (UTC+01:00)	Gabriel (yellow card) 69'; Siovas (yellow card) 74' (yellow-red card) 84'; Muñoz (yellow card) 77'	Report	Charles (yellow card) 80'; Ramis 90+4', (yellow card) 90+5'	Stadium: Butarque; Attendance: 8,694; Referee: Pablo González Fuertes

18 February 2018 24	Eibar	0–2	Barcelona	Eibar
16:15 CET (UTC+01:00)	Orellana (yellow card) 58' (yellow-red card) 66'; Diop (yellow card) 66'	Report	L. Suárez 16'; Iniesta (yellow card) 48'; Alba 88'	Stadium: Ipurua; Attendance: 6,725; Referee: Alejandro Hernández Hernández

25 February 2018 25	Celta Vigo	2–0	Eibar	Vigo
13:00 CET (UTC+01:00)	Radoja (yellow card) 38'; Cabral (yellow card) 39'; Aspas 56'; M. Gómez 79'	Report	Diop (yellow card) 12'; José Ángel (yellow card) 37'; Oliveira (yellow card) 80'	Stadium: Balaídos; Attendance: 15,572; Referee: Carlos del Cerro Grande

28 February 2018 26	Eibar	1–0	Villarreal	Eibar
21:30 CET (UTC+01:00)	Kike 16'; Arbilla (yellow card) 51'; Juncà (yellow card) 73'; Dmitrović (yellow card) 81'; Orellana (yellow card) 90+1'	Report	Álvaro (yellow card) 27'; Mario Gaspar (yellow card) 72'	Stadium: Ipurua; Attendance: 4,056; Referee: Mario Melero López

4 March 2018 27	Deportivo La Coruña	1–1	Eibar	A Coruña
18:30 CET (UTC+01:00)	Andone 33'; Koval (red card) 39'; Sidnei (yellow card) 89'	Report	Inui 11'; Peña (yellow card) 64'; José Ángel (yellow card) 78'	Stadium: Riazor; Attendance: 19,437; Referee: Santiago Jaime Latre

11 March 2018 28	Eibar	1–2	Real Madrid	Eibar
13:00 CET (UTC+01:00)	Ramis (yellow card) 45', (goal) 50'	Report	Bale (yellow card) 30'; Ronaldo 34', 84'	Stadium: Ipurua; Attendance: 6,707; Referee: José Luis Munuera Montero

18 March 2018 29	Levante	2–1	Eibar	Valencia
21:00 CEST (UTC+02:00)	Cabaco (yellow card) 19'; Roger 25', (yellow card) 34'; Lerma (yellow card) 61'; Boateng 64'; Lukić (yellow card) 90+2'	Report	García (yellow card) 33'; Charles 63', (yellow card) 69'; Arbilla (yellow card) 90+4'	Stadium: Ciutat de València; Attendance: 15,405; Referee: Ignacio Iglesias Villanueva

1 April 2018 30	Eibar	0–0	Real Sociedad	Eibar
18:30 CEST (UTC+02:00)	Diop (yellow card) 13'; Ramis (yellow card) 57'; Capa (yellow card) 81'; Pedro León (yellow card) 90+2'	Report	Illarramendi (yellow card) 87'; Llorente (yellow card) 90+3'	Stadium: Ipurua; Attendance: 6,192; Referee: José María Sánchez Martínez

8 April 2018 31	Real Betis	2–0	Eibar	Seville
18:30 CEST (UTC+02:00)	León 21'; Arbilla 50' (o.g.); Mandi (yellow card) 79'; Amat (yellow card) 90+2'	Report	García (yellow card) 56'; Orellana (yellow card) 69'	Stadium: Benito Villamarín; Attendance: 47,983; Referee: David Medié Jiménez

15 April 2018 32	Eibar	0–1	Alavés	Eibar
12:00 CEST (UTC+02:00)	Juncà (yellow card) 44'; Arbilla (yellow card) 77'	Report	Guidetti 5'; Aguirregabiria (yellow card) 51'	Stadium: Ipurua; Attendance: 5,814; Referee: Alberto Undiano Mallenco

18 April 2018 33	Espanyol	0–1	Eibar	Cornellà de Llobregat
19:30 CEST (UTC+02:00)	Hermoso (yellow card) 33'; J. López (yellow card) 51'; V. Sánchez (yellow card) 56'	Report	Lombán 32'; Capa (yellow card) 57'; Diop (yellow card) 90+4'	Stadium: RCDE Stadium; Attendance: 11,862; Referee: Alejandro Hernández Hernández

22 April 2018 34	Eibar	0–1	Getafe	Eibar
13:00 CEST (UTC+02:00)	Oliveira (yellow card) 27'; Charles (yellow card) 53'; Alejo (yellow card) 77'; Lombán (yellow card) 89'	Report	Olivera 23'; Suárez (yellow card) 58'	Stadium: Ipurua; Attendance: 4,868; Referee: Ignacio Iglesias Villanueva

29 April 2018 35	Valencia	0–0	Eibar	Valencia
18:30 CEST (UTC+02:00)	Kondogbia (yellow card) 44'; Parejo (yellow card) 78'	Report	José Ángel (yellow card) 15'; Jordán (yellow card) 82'; Kike (yellow card) 90+1'	Stadium: Mestalla; Attendance: 40,400; Referee: Santiago Jaime Latre

6 May 2018 36	Girona	1–4	Eibar	Girona
13:00 CEST (UTC+02:00)	Timor (yellow card) 43'; Aday 55'; Portu (yellow card) 82'	Report	Kike 9', 38', (yellow card) 75'; García (yellow card) 58'; Diop (yellow card) 62'; Alejo (yellow card) 66'; Orellana (yellow card) 75'; Jordán 80'; Inui 89'	Stadium: Montilivi; Attendance: 9,706; Referee: Daniel Trujillo Suárez

13 May 2018 37	Eibar	1–0	Las Palmas	Eibar
--:-- CEST (UTC+02:00)		[Report]		Stadium: Ipurua

20 May 2018 38	Atlético Madrid	2–2	Eibar	Madrid
--:-- CEST (UTC+02:00)		[Report]		Stadium: Wanda Metropolitano

=== Copa del Rey ===
==== Matches ====
Win Draw Loss

===== Round of 32 =====
25 October 2017 First leg	Eibar	1–2	Celta Vigo	Eibar
21:30 CEST (UTC+02:00)	Oliveira (yellow card) 3'; Lombán (yellow card) 16'; Enrich 18'; Sarriegi (yellow card) 25'	Report	Cabral 4'; Guidetti 44'	Stadium: Ipurua; Attendance: 3,432; Referee: Alberto Undiano Mallenco

28 November 2017 Second leg	Celta Vigo	1–0 (3–1 agg.)	Eibar	Vigo
21:30	Aspas 90' (pen.)	Report	Jordán (yellow card) 56'; Gálvez (yellow card) 71'	Stadium: Balaídos; Attendance: 8,286; Referee: Xavier Estrada Fernández

== Statistics ==
=== Appearances and goals ===
No.	Pos	Nat	Player	Total		La Liga		Copa del Rey	
No.	Pos	Nat	Player	Apps	Goals	Apps	Goals	Apps	Goals
Goalkeepers
1	GK	(Spain) ESP	Yoel	1	0	1	0	0	0
13	GK	(Spain) ESP	Asier Riesgo	2	0	1	0	1	0
25	GK	(Serbia) SRB	Marko Dmitrović	37	0	36	0	1	0
Defenders
4	DF	(Spain) ESP	Iván Ramis	16	3	15+1	3	0	0
7	DF	(Spain) ESP	Ander Capa	34	0	25+8	0	1	0
12	DF	(Portugal) POR	Paulo Oliveira	27	0	25+1	0	1	0
15	DF	(Spain) ESP	José Ángel	31	0	28+2	0	1	0
18	DF	(Spain) ESP	Anaitz Arbilla	31	2	26+3	2	0+2	0
22	DF	(Spain) ESP	David Lombán	15	1	11+2	1	2	0
23	DF	(Spain) ESP	David Juncà	16	0	10+5	0	1	0
Midfielders
5	MF	(Argentina) ARG	Gonzalo Escalante	28	1	16+12	1	0	0
8	MF	(Japan) JPN	Takashi Inui	35	5	31+3	5	0+1	0
11	MF	(Spain) ESP	Rubén Peña	30	1	18+10	1	2	0
14	MF	(Spain) ESP	Dani García	32	0	32	0	0	0
16	MF	(Spain) ESP	Fran Rico	0	0	0	0	0	0
20	MF	(Spain) ESP	Iván Alejo	22	1	14+8	1	0	0
21	MF	(Spain) ESP	Pedro León	12	0	10+2	0	0	0
24	MF	(Spain) ESP	Joan Jordán	37	6	25+10	6	2	0
26	MF	(Spain) ESP	Imanol Sarriegi	5	0	0+3	0	2	0
32	MF	(Spain) ESP	Julen Azkue	1	0	0	0	0+1	0
Forwards
9	FW	(Spain) ESP	Sergi Enrich	21	4	14+5	3	1+1	1
17	FW	(Spain) ESP	Kike	37	8	28+7	8	1+1	0
19	FW	(Brazil) BRA	Charles	31	8	18+12	8	1	0
41	FW	(Spain) ESP	Xesc Regis	1	0	0+1	0	0	0
Players transferred out during the season
3	DF	(Spain) ESP	Álex Gálvez	6	1	4	1	2	0
6	MF	(Spain) ESP	Christian Rivera	8	0	2+5	0	1	0
10	FW	(Portugal) POR	Bebé	11	0	3+6	0	2	0

Last updated: 30 May 2018
Source: BDFutbol
