= 2013 Copa del Rey Juvenil =

Tournament details
- Country: Spain
- Teams: 16

Final positions
- Champions: Real Madrid
- Runners-up: Athletic

The 2013 Copa del Rey Juvenil is the 63rd staging of the Copa del Rey Juvenil de Fútbol. The competition began on May 19, 2013 and will end on June 30, 2013 with the final.

== First round ==
The top two teams from each group and the two best third-placed teams are drawn into a two-game best aggregate score series. The first leg began the week of May 18 and the return leg the week of May 25.

Team 1	Agg.	Team 2	1st leg	2nd leg
Sporting Gijón	0 – 9	Athletic	0–4	0–5
Osasuna	4 – 1	Deportivo	1–0	3–1
Celta	3 – 6	Barcelona	1–1	2–5
Levante	4 – 1	Almería	3–0	1–1
Málaga	2 – 4	Villarreal	1–2	1–2
Mallorca	2 – 4	Sevilla	2–3	0–1
Atlético	4 – 1	Las Palmas	2–0	2–1
Tenerife	2 – 5	Real Madrid	1–3	1–2

== Quarter-final ==
The eight winners from the first round advance to quarter-final for a two-game series best aggregate score with the first leg beginning the week of June 1 and returning the week of June 8.

Team 1	Agg.	Team 2	1st leg	2nd leg
Atlético	1 – 1	Sevilla	0 – 1	1 – 0 (4-3 p)
Levante	2 – 1	Osasuna	1 – 0	1 – 1
Villarreal	2 – 5	Real Madrid	2 – 1	0 – 4
Athletic	7 – 3	Barcelona	5 – 0	2 – 3

== Semi-finals ==
The four winners play a two-game series best aggregate score beginning the week of June 15 and returning the week of June 22.

Team 1	Agg.	Team 2	1st leg	2nd leg
Atlético	2 – 5	Athletic	2 – 4	0 – 1
Real Madrid	3 – 1	Levante	2 – 1	1 – 0

== Final ==
The semi-final winners play a one game final at Campo de Las Viñas in Vera, Almería the week of June 29.

=== Details ===
29 June 2013

Athletic	0–4	Real Madrid
	Report Report	De Tomás 27'; Benavente 44', 86'; Lucas (yellow card) 56'; Carrallo 88'

Estadio Municipal de Las Viñas, Vera (Almería)
Attendance: 1,600
Referee: David Fernández Borbalán

Athletic Bilbao	Real Madrid

ATHLETIC:
GK	13	(Spain) Alejandro Remiro
DF	38	(Spain) Jon Agirrezabala	(substituted off) 83'
DF		(Spain) Urtzi Iriondo	(substituted off) 71'
DF	4	(Spain) Ander Santamaría (c)	(substituted off) 71'
DF		(Spain) Yeray
MF		(Spain) Unai López
MF		(Spain) Iker de Eguino
MF		(France) Yanis
MF	3	(Spain) Asier Etxaburu	(substituted off) 46'
FW		(Spain) Jurgi Oteo
FW		(Spain) Iñaki Williams
Substitutes:
GK		(Spain) Jon Ander
DF		(Spain) Imanol Corral	(substituted on) 71'
MF	7	(Spain) Iker Revuelta	(substituted on) 83'
MF	15	(France) Maecky Lubrano	(substituted on) 71'
MF		(Spain) Gorka Iturraspe	(substituted on) 46'
Manager:
(Spain) Gontzal Suances

REAL MADRID:
GK	1	(Spain) Alfonso Herrero
DF	2	(Spain) Óscar Arroyo
DF	4	(Spain) Iván Sáez	(substituted off) 88'
DF	5	(Spain) Jaime
DF	3	(Spain) Diego
MF	6	(Spain) Lucas Torró	(yellow card) 56' (substituted off) 87'
MF	8	(Spain) Gonzalo Melero (c)
FW	7	(Spain) Ismael	(substituted off) 68'
FW	11	(Spain) Alberto Lozano	(substituted off) 76'
MF	10	(Peru) Cristian Benavente
FW	9	(Spain) Raúl de Tomás
Substitutes:
GK	13	(Spain) Javier Olmedo
DF	12	(Spain) Rafa Sáez	(substituted on) 88'
MF	14	(Spain) Marcos Llorente	(substituted on) 76'
MF	15	(Spain) Sergio Carrallo	(substituted on) 87'
MF	16	(Spain) Cristian Cedrés	(substituted on) 68'
Manager:
(Spain) Luis Miguel Ramis

Copa del Rey
Winners
Real Madrid

== See also ==
- 2010 Copa del Rey Juvenil (final played between same clubs)
- 2012–13 División de Honor Juvenil de Fútbol
