= Gayoso =

Gayoso is a Spanish surname and may refer to:

== People ==
Notable people with this surname include:

- Ander Gayoso (born 1993), Spanish footballer
- Javier Gayoso (born 1997), Filipino footballer
- Manuel Gayoso (born 1944), Spanish runner
- Manuel Gayoso de Lemos (1747–1799), Spanish military officer
- Roberto Trashorras Gayoso (born 1981), Spanish footballer

== Places ==
- Gayoso, Missouri, United States
