= Pedro León =

Spanish footballer (born 1986)

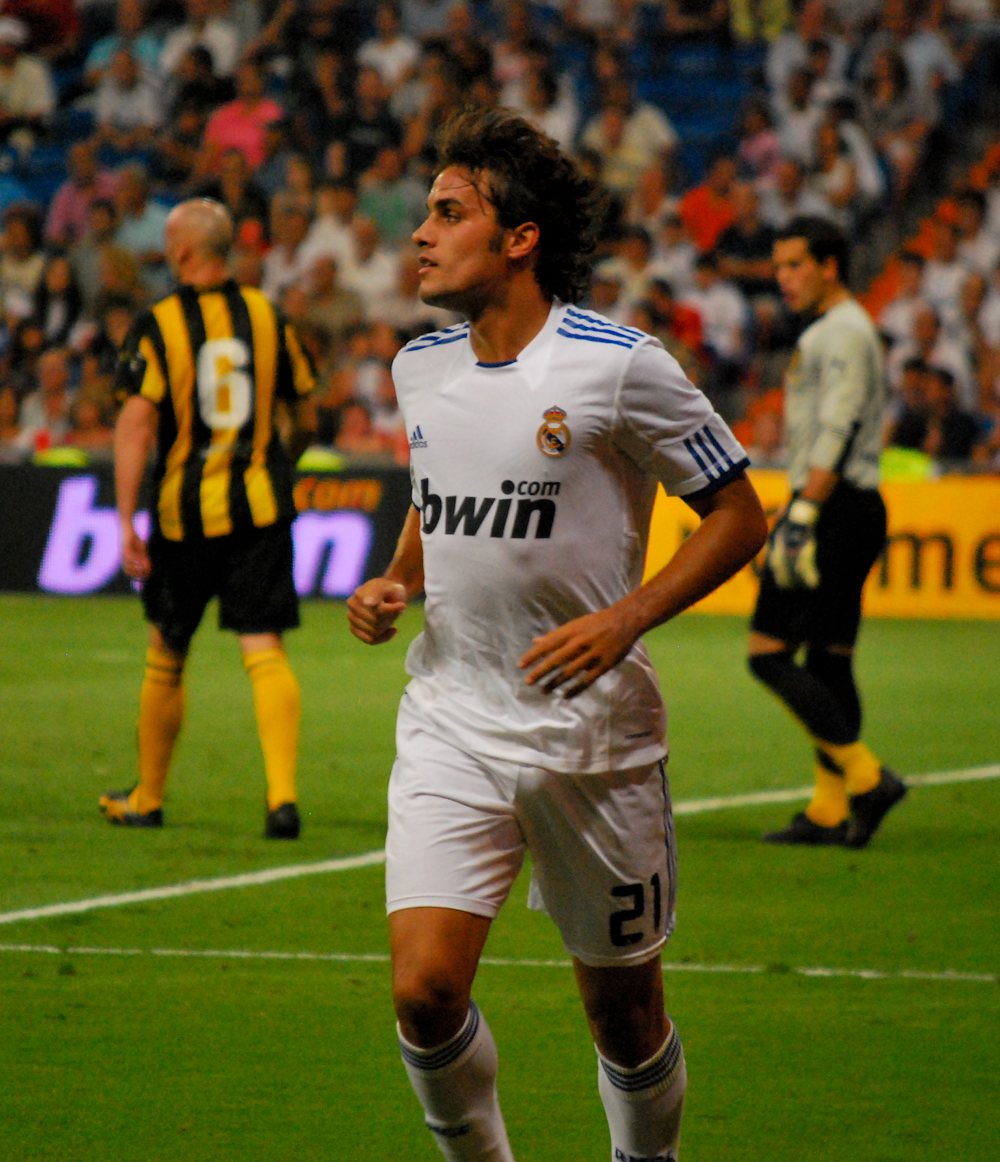
- León with Real Madrid in 2010

Personal information
- Full name: Pedro León Sánchez Gil
- Date of birth: 24 November 1986 (age 39)
- Place of birth: Mula, Spain
- Height: 1.83 m (6 ft 0 in)
- Position: Winger

Youth career
- 2000–2002: Muleño
- 2002–2004: Nueva Vanguardia
- 2004: Murcia

Senior career*
Years	Team	Apps	(Gls)
2004–2005	Murcia B	18	(4)
2005–2007	Murcia	68	(10)
2007–2008	Levante	24	(3)
2008–2009	Valladolid	33	(3)
2009–2010	Getafe	35	(8)
2010–2013	Real Madrid	6	(1)
2011–2013	→ Getafe (loan)	42	(5)
2013–2016	Getafe	93	(11)
2016–2021	Eibar	113	(13)
2021–2022	Fuenlabrada	39	(10)
2022–2026	Murcia	115	(22)
Total		586	(89)

International career
2007–2009	Spain U21	6	(1)
- * Club domestic league appearances and goals

Pedro León Sánchez Gil (Spanish pronunciation: [ˈpeðɾo leˈon ˈsantʃeθ]; born 24 November 1986), known as León, is a Spanish former professional footballer who played as a right winger.

After making a name for himself at Valladolid and Getafe, he transferred to Real Madrid in 2010. He left after a sole season troubled by problems with the management, going on to represent Getafe and Eibar also in La Liga and make 346 appearances in the competition (43 goals scored). He started and finished his 22-year career with Murcia.

A Spain under-21 international, León represented the nation at the 2009 European Championship.

== Club career ==
=== Murcia ===
Born in Mula, Region of Murcia, León began playing with local Muleño CF and Nueva Vanguardia's youth teams, eventually moving in early 2004 to Real Murcia CF to finish his youth career.

After a spell with the B team, he made his official debut with the main squad on 15 January 2005, in a Segunda División 5–1 loss away loss against UE Lleida, going on to play a further six matches during the season and scoring in a 3–1 win at neighbouring Ciudad de Murcia.

The following two seasons, León became an integral player for Murcia, netting seven goals in the 2006–07 campaign, several from free kicks, as the side returned to La Liga after a three-year absence. In January 2007, he was rumoured to be moving to Real Madrid or Chelsea, being speculated that the latter would buy him for £3.4 million.

=== Levante ===
Despite all transfer rumours, León joined modest Levante UD in the 2007 summer for £2.5 million after rejecting an offer from to renew his contract for €1 million, a move the club found quite offensive. He often underachieved in 2007–08, starting only 11 times from 24 appearances as Levante returned to the second tier. He also ended up training alone, due to problems with management and teammates alike.

=== Valladolid ===
On 13 September 2008, Real Valladolid bought León for €300,000 after a quick negotiation. Soon becoming first choice, he provided his first assist for Fabián Canobbio on 15 November in a 1–0 home victory over Real Madrid, netting his first for the club a week later in a 3–0 away defeat of Villarreal CF.

=== Getafe ===
After lengthy negotiations with Getafe CF, with the player appearing very rarely for Valladolid in pre-season, a five-year contract worth around €4 million was finally arranged in August 2009. León scored nine goals in all competitions during the season (eight in the league, with nine assists), as the Madrilenians finished sixth and qualified for the UEFA Europa League for the second time in their history.

=== Real Madrid ===
On 15 July 2010, Real Madrid confirmed the transfer of León for €10 million; the player passed the pertinent medical test and was presented the following day. He made his debut on 4 August in a friendly with Club América, playing the full match in a 3–2 win. In his second appearance, four days later, he scored against the LA Galaxy as the match ended with the same score.

León scored his first competitive goal on 3 November 2010, combining with Karim Benzema – both players had come from the bench during the second half – for a last-minute goal at AC Milan in the group stage of the UEFA Champions League, a 2–2 draw that sent the Spaniards through to the knockout stage. During the course of the league campaign, however, he appeared rarely: after assuming he would start against AJ Auxerre in the Champions League in late September, he was immediately dropped from the list of 18 by coach José Mourinho. Later, he was ridiculed in the press by his own manager when the latter justified his absence. In early February 2011, both he and teammate Fernando Gago were dropped from the squad that would face Sevilla FC in the semi-finals of the Copa del Rey, for fighting in training; Gago was however picked for the next match, whereas León was not.

Chelsea renewed their interest in taking León on loan in the winter transfer window, but no transfer took place – he reportedly blamed Mourinho for blocking the move. In March 2011, after the market had closed, Hércules CF tried to acquire the player on loan following Tote's severe knee injury, but Real Madrid refused again.

=== Getafe return ===
At the end of the 2011 summer transfer window, León returned to former club Getafe on a season-long loan. He scored the first goal of his second spell on 1 October, with a spectacular long-range strike at Málaga CF in a 3–2 loss. The move was extended for the following campaign.

Subsequently, León signed for Getafe on a permanent basis. On 6 October 2013, he scored twice in a 3–1 home win over Real Betis, his first coming through a 40-meter free kick.

León was not allowed to be registered for the start of 2014–15, as the club had exceeded the €17 million salary cap. The situation was finally resolved on 24 November, the day of his 28th birthday.

=== Eibar ===
On 5 July 2016, after Getafe's relegation, León signed a two-year deal with SD Eibar also in the top flight. He scored a career-best ten goals in his first season – only behind Sergi Enrich's 11 in the squad– but missed the vast majority of the following after replapsing from a left-knee injury.

=== Fuenlabrada ===
After Eibar's relegation, León agreed to a one-year contract with CF Fuenlabrada of the second division on 1 August 2021. He scored a squad-best ten goals in his only season (seven from penalties), but his team went down as second-bottom.

=== Later career ===
On 12 July 2022, aged 35, León returned to Murcia. He scored 15 goals in the first season of his second spell, spending his entire tenure in the Primera Federación.

León announced his retirement on 20 May 2026.

== International career ==
León made his debut for the Spain national under-21 team on 31 January 2007. On 6 February, Iñaki Sáez played him again in a friendly with England, in which he was replaced by Juan Mata in a 2–2 away draw. He also featured in the 2009 European Championship qualifier against Georgia, coming on for Alejandro Alfaro in the second half a 1–0 away win.

Picked in the 23-man squad for the final stages in Sweden, León scored in the last game against Finland, but the nation did not progress from the group stage.

== Personal life ==
León's older brother, Luis León Sánchez, was a road bicycle racer. His other brother Antonio also played football, but the indoor variety.

León was not his surname, but he carried it as a middle name in memory of his grandfather and eldest brother, who both died in 2006 (the latter in a motorbike accident), and tended to just go by the name León rather than León Sánchez (as his two brothers), also celebrating his goals by pointing to the sky.

== Career statistics ==
As of 25 May 2024

Appearances and goals by club, season and competition
Club	Season	League			National cup		Europe		Total	
Club	Season	Division	Apps	Goals	Apps	Goals	Apps	Goals	Apps	Goals
Murcia	2004–05	Segunda División	7	1	0	0	—		7	1
Murcia	2005–06	Segunda División	30	2	2	0	—		32	2
Murcia	2006–07	Segunda División	31	7	1	0	—		32	7
Murcia	Total		68	10	3	0	—		71	10
Levante	2007–08	La Liga	24	3	3	0	—		27	3
Valladolid	2008–09	La Liga	33	3	2	2	—		35	5
Getafe	2009–10	La Liga	35	8	7	1	—		42	9
Real Madrid	2010–11	La Liga	6	0	4	1	4 (Note: Appearances in UEFA Champions League)	1	14	2
Getafe	2011–12	La Liga	13	2	0	0	—		13	2
Getafe	2012–13	La Liga	29	3	1	0	—		30	3
Getafe	2013–14	La Liga	37	7	4	0	—		41	7
Getafe	2014–15	La Liga	25	2	4	0	—		29	2
Getafe	2015–16	La Liga	31	2	2	1	—		33	3
Getafe	Total		135	16	11	1	—		146	17
Eibar	2016–17	La Liga	37	10	2	1	—		39	11
Eibar	2017–18	La Liga	12	0	0	0	—		12	0
Eibar	2018–19	La Liga	9	1	0	0	—		9	1
Eibar	2019–20	La Liga	31	1	1	1	—		32	2
Eibar	2020–21	La Liga	24	1	3	3	—		27	4
Eibar	Total		113	13	6	5	—		119	18
Fuenlabrada	2021–22	Segunda División	39	10	2	0	—		41	10
Murcia	2022–23	Primera Federación	35	15	0	0	—		35	15
Murcia	2023–24	Primera Federación	30	3	0	0	—		30	3
Murcia	Total		65	18	0	0	—		65	18
Career total			518	81	38	10	4	1	560	92

== Honours ==
Real Madrid

- Copa del Rey: 2010–11
