= Etxaburu =

Etxaburu is a surname. Notable people with the surname include:

- Aitor Etxaburu (born 1966), Spanish handball player
- Asier Etxaburu (born 1994), Spanish footballer
