= Peleteiro =

- Ana Peleteiro, Spanish triple jumper
- Jota Peleteiro, Spanish footballer
