= Dani García (footballer, born 1990) =

Spanish footballer (born 1990)

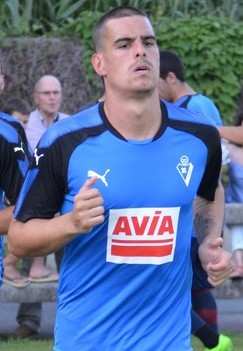
- García with Eibar in 2017

Personal information
- Full name: Daniel García Carrillo
- Date of birth: 24 May 1990 (age 36)
- Place of birth: Zumarraga, Spain
- Height: 1.80 m (5 ft 11 in)
- Position: Defensive midfielder

Team information
- Current team: Atromitos
- Number: 14

Youth career
- Real Sociedad

Senior career*
Years	Team	Apps	(Gls)
2009–2010	Alicante B	26	(0)
2010–2011	Alicante	29	(0)
2011–2012	Getafe B	36	(0)
2012–2014	Real Sociedad	0	(0)
2012–2014	→ Eibar (loan)	73	(1)
2014–2018	Eibar	137	(2)
2018–2024	Athletic Bilbao	166	(1)
2024–2026	Olympiacos	49	(1)
2026–	Atromitos	2	(1)

International career^{‡}
2014–	Basque Country	5	(0)
- * Club domestic league appearances and goals as of 15:04, 5 November 2026 (UTC) ‡ National team caps and goals as of 24 March 2024

Daniel 'Dani' García Carrillo (born 24 May 1990) is a Spanish professional footballer who plays as a defensive midfielder for Super League Greece club Atromitos.

He spent the vast majority of his professional career with Eibar since joining in 2012 (initially on loan), representing the club in all three major levels of Spanish football and playing 224 competitive matches. In 2018, he signed with Athletic Bilbao, where he made 195 appearances and won the 2023–24 Copa del Rey and the 2021 Supercopa de España.

== Club career ==
=== Early career ===
Born in Zumarraga, Gipuzkoa, Basque Country, García started his career in the cantera of Real Sociedad, and made his senior debut with Alicante CF B in 2009–10. He was promoted to the latter's first team later that year, but suffered relegation from Segunda División B in his second season.

On 24 June 2011, García joined Getafe CF B in the same league.

=== Eibar ===
García signed with Real Sociedad in July 2012, being immediately loaned back to the third tier to play for SD Eibar. He finished his debut campaign with 41 league appearances to his credit, helping the side to promote in the playoffs.

In July 2013, García's loan to Eibar was renewed, and he made his Segunda División debut on 18 August, starting in a 2–1 away win against Real Jaén. On 26 June 2014 he signed permanently with the Armeros, promoted to La Liga for the first time ever.

García made his debut in the Spanish top flight on 24 August 2014, starting in a 1–0 home victory over former employers Real Sociedad. He scored his first goal in the competition on 19 September, opening the 2–0 away defeat of Elche CF.

On 17 November 2015, García renewed his contract with Eibar until 2018. In April 2017, having only missed nine league games since their promotion, he became the first player to reach the milestone of 100 top-division appearances for the club; in October of the same year, he became only their twelfth to take part in 200 matches.

=== Athletic Bilbao ===
On 3 June 2018, Athletic Bilbao announced that García had signed a four-year contract after the transfer was agreed in March. Ander Capa made the same move; within weeks they were joined by another former teammate Yuri Berchiche, and before the end of the calendar year by the coach from their Eibar promotion seasons, Gaizka Garitano. He totalled 32 appearances in his first season, his 29 in the league being all starts.

García scored his first goal for Athletic – 203 games after his last career one – on 6 October 2023, in the 3–0 home win over UD Almería. In May 2024, with 195 matches to his credit (two in the Copa del Rey which the Lions won), he announced he would be leaving.

=== Olympiacos ===
On 5 July 2024, upon the expiry of his contract, the 34-year-old García joined Super League Greece side Olympiacos FC, reuniting with his former Eibar manager José Luis Mendilibar. He won a double in 2024–25, and subsequently agreed to another one-year deal.

García scored his first goal for the club on 4 February 2026, opening an eventual 3–0 away victory against Asteras Tripolis F.C. from a corner kick.

=== Atromitos ===
On 20 September 2026, García moved to Atromitos F.C. on a free transfer. He scored on his debut on 10 October, but in a 2–1 loss away to Asteras Tripolis.

== Career statistics ==
As of match played 17 May 2026

Appearances and goals by club, season and competition
Club	Season	League			National cup		Continental		Other		Total	
Club	Season	Division	Apps	Goals	Apps	Goals	Apps	Goals	Apps	Goals	Apps	Goals
Alicante	2009–10	Segunda División B	9	0	—		—		—		9	0
Alicante	2010–11	Segunda División B	20	0	—		—		—		20	0
Alicante	Total		29	0	0	0	0	0	0	0	29	0
Getafe B	2011–12	Segunda División B	36	0	—		—		—		36	0
Eibar (loan)	2012–13	Segunda División B	35	1	4	0	—		6 (Note: Appearances in Segunda División B play-offs)	0	45	1
Eibar (loan)	2013–14	Segunda División	38	0	0	0	—		—		38	0
Eibar	2014–15	La Liga	34	1	2	0	—		—		36	1
Eibar	2015–16	La Liga	35	0	0	0	—		—		35	0
Eibar	2016–17	La Liga	36	1	2	0	—		—		38	1
Eibar	2017–18	La Liga	32	0	0	0	—		—		32	0
Eibar	Total		210	3	8	0	0	0	6	0	224	3
Athletic Bilbao	2018–19	La Liga	29	0	3	0	—		—		32	0
Athletic Bilbao	2019–20	La Liga	36	0	5 (Note: Includes appearance in 2020 Copa del Rey final (played in 2021))	0	—		—		41	0
Athletic Bilbao	2020–21	La Liga	27	0	6	0	—		2 (Note: Appearances in Supercopa de España)	0	35	0
Athletic Bilbao	2021–22	La Liga	32	0	5	0	—		2	0	39	0
Athletic Bilbao	2022–23	La Liga	25	0	4	0	—		—		29	0
Athletic Bilbao	2023–24	La Liga	17	1	2	0	—		—		19	1
Athletic Bilbao	Total		166	1	25	0	0	0	4	0	195	1
Olympiacos	2024–25	Super League Greece	27	0	4	0	6 (Note: Appearances in UEFA Europa League)	0	—		37	0
Olympiacos	2025–26	Super League Greece	21	1	3	0	8 (Note: Appearances in UEFA Champions League)	0	—		32	1
Olympiacos	Total		48	1	7	0	14	0	—		69	1
Career total			489	5	40	0	14	0	10	0	553	5

== Honours ==
Eibar

- Segunda División: 2013–14

Athletic Bilbao

- Copa del Rey: 2023–24; runner-up: 2019–20, 2020–21
- Supercopa de España: 2021

Olympiacos

- Super League Greece: 2024–25
- Greek Football Cup: 2024–25
- Greek Super Cup: 2025
