= Julen Azkue =

Spanish footballer (born 1995)

Personal information
- Full name: Julen Azkue Unzueta
- Date of birth: 21 September 1995 (age 31)
- Place of birth: Zarautz, Spain
- Height: 1.87 m (6 ft 2 in)
- Position: Midfielder

Youth career
- Eibar

Senior career*
Years	Team	Apps	(Gls)
2014–2018	Vitoria	94	(13)
2014–2015	→ Lagun Onak (loan)	36	(2)
2017–2018	Eibar	0	(0)
2018–2019	Arenas Getxo	33	(2)
2019–2020	Tudelano	19	(1)
2020	Amorebieta	3	(0)
2020–2021	Villanovense	23	(2)
2021–2022	Atlético Sanluqueño	32	(2)
2022–2023	Real Unión	28	(0)
2024	Sestao River	8	(1)
- * Club domestic league appearances and goals as of 25 May 2024

Julen Azkue Unzueta (born 21 September 1995) is a Spanish footballer who plays as a midfielder.

== Club career ==
Born in Zarautz, Gipuzkoa, Basque Country, Azkue finished his formation with SD Eibar. On 8 August 2014, he was loaned to Tercera División side CD Lagun Onak for one year.

Upon returning, Azkue was assigned to the reserves also in the fourth division.

Azkue made his first team debut on 28 November 2017, coming on as a second-half substitute for Joan Jordán in a 0–1 away loss against Celta de Vigo, for the season's Copa del Rey. The following 19 June, he signed for Arenas Club de Getxo in the third division.
