= Jota (footballer, born 1991) =

Spanish footballer (born 1991)

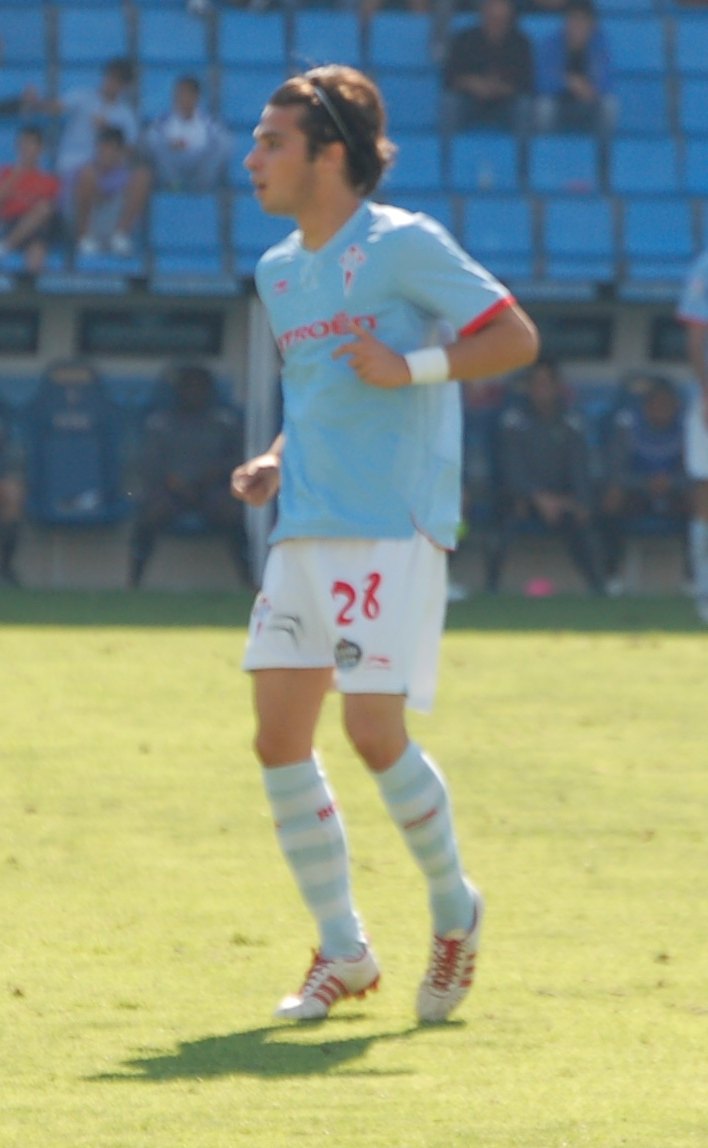
- Jota with Celta Vigo B in 2011

Personal information
- Full name: José Ignacio Peleteiro Ramallo
- Date of birth: 16 June 1991 (age 35)
- Place of birth: A Pobra do Caramiñal, Galicia, Spain
- Height: 1.80 m (5 ft 11 in)
- Position: Attacking midfielder

Youth career
- 2000–2004: Xuventud Aguiño
- 2004–2010: Celta

Senior career*
Years	Team	Apps	(Gls)
2010–2012	Celta B	68	(22)
2011–2014	Celta	4	(0)
2012–2013	→ Real Madrid B (loan)	3	(0)
2013–2014	→ Eibar (loan)	35	(11)
2014–2017	Brentford	69	(23)
2016–2017	→ Eibar (loan)	18	(0)
2017–2019	Birmingham City	72	(8)
2019–2020	Aston Villa	10	(0)
2020–2021	Alavés	23	(0)
Total		302	(64)

International career
2016	Galicia	1	(0)
- * Club domestic league appearances and goals

José Ignacio Peleteiro Ramallo (born 16 June 1991), commonly known as Jota and Jota Peleteiro, is a Spanish former professional footballer who played as an attacking midfielder.

A product of the Celta Vigo youth system, he only played a handful of times for club's first team, despite appearing regularly for Celta B. He had a loan spell with Real Madrid Castilla in 2012–13 and helped Eibar gain promotion to La Liga while on loan in the 2013–14 season. He subsequently spent three years with English club Brentford, during which time he again played on loan at Eibar. In August 2017, he joined Birmingham City for a club record fee. Halfway through a four-year contract, he joined local rivals Aston Villa, where he played little, and left in October 2020 to spend the rest of the season with Alavés.

Jota played for the Galicia representative team in a friendly game against Venezuela in 2016.

== Club career ==
=== Celta Vigo ===
Jota finished his development with Galician club Celta de Vigo, after joining the club's youth system at the age of 13. He made his first-team debut on 29 January 2011, coming on as an 89th-minute substitute for Enrique de Lucas in a 1–1 draw with Barcelona B in the Segunda División. Jota played twice in April 2011, making his first start in a 1–0 win away to Albacete on 17 April – he lasted 73 minutes before being replaced by Mateo – and finished the 2010–11 season with four appearances. His only first-team appearance of the 2011–12 season came as a 73rd-minute substitute for Joan Tomàs in a 3–1 Copa del Rey third round win over Real Valladolid on 12 October 2011. He did however captain and top-score for Celta's B-team as they finished bottom of the 2011–12 Segunda División B. With Celta's first team back in La Liga for the 2012–13 season, Jota was not in the manager's plans, and he spent the next season out on loan.

Although he said he only wanted to leave on a permanent transfer, Jota was loaned to Real Madrid Castilla, newly promoted to the Segunda División for the 2012–13 season. The deal included an option to purchase for a fee of around €1 million. Mostly confined to the bench, he made just three appearances.

On Jota's return to Celta, he found new manager Luis Enrique equally willing to dispense with his services, so he again went out on loan, joining Eibar for the 2013–14 Segunda División season. He instantly broke into the team and made 37 appearances during the season. On 25 May 2014, Jota scored the only goal of the game at home to Deportivo Alavés that confirmed Eibar's promotion to La Liga for the first time in the club's history. Jota finished the season with 11 goals and collected a Segunda División winners' medal after Eibar were promoted as champions. In recognition of his performances, Jota was one of three nominees for the Best Attacking Midfielder award at the 2014 LFP Awards – he lost out to Ayoze Pérez – and was named in the division's Team of the Year.

Eduardo Berizzo – Luis Enrique's successor – saw Jota as part of his vision for Celta. The club opened talks with Jota's father, who acted as his representative, over a contract extension, but no agreement could be reached. Injury kept the player out of pre-season, and his omission from the team at the beginning of the season was attributed to concerns he might suffer a relapse, and had no connection to his contractual situation. Jota left Celta in August 2014, having made just five senior appearances.

=== Brentford ===
On 15 August 2014, Jota signed a three-year deal with English club Brentford, newly promoted to the Championship, for an undisclosed fee, reported in Spain as €1.5 million. He made his debut as a 64th-minute substitute for Moses Odubajo in a 2–1 victory over Blackpool at Bloomfield Road four days later. He made his first start for the Bees in the following game, against Birmingham City, but lasted only 17 minutes before being sacrificed for Harlee Dean after Tony Craig received a straight red card. On his seventh appearance, Jota scored his first goal for the club – firing the ball into the top corner during first-half stoppage-time – in a 2–0 win over Leeds United at Griffin Park on 27 September. He scored again the following Saturday, converting Alan McCormack's cross for the opening goal in a 3–1 victory over Reading.

In mid-November and after two goals in 15 games, Jota revealed that the intensity of the English game meant that he was playing at only 60–70% of his capabilities. He rediscovered his form in late November, scoring four goals in his next four matches – one of which, the very late (91st minute) winner against West London rivals Fulham, was chosen as the Bees Player Outstanding Moment of the Season – and earning a place in the Football League Team of the Week for his performance and goal in a 3–2 victory over Cardiff City on 20 December. His Cardiff strike, in which he "curled a stunning shot into the top corner from outside the corner of the penalty area", was nominated as Brentford's entry for the 2014 Mitre Goal of the Year award.

In late March and early April 2015, Jota scored three goals in four matches to help maintain the Bees' playoff push. He was named as one of FourFourTwo magazine's top 40 Football League players of the season. In the final game of the season on 2 May, Jota scored and assisted Andre Gray in a 3–0 home win over Wigan Athletic, winning a place in the Football League Team of the Week. The win confirmed Brentford in a fifth-place finish, which meant they would face Middlesbrough in the playoff semi-finals, but Jota's first season in English football ended in a 5–1 aggregate defeat. He made 46 appearances and scored 11 goals.

Jota's 2015–16 season was halted on the opening day versus Ipswich Town when he damaged ankle ligaments in a tackle by former Brentford teammate Jonathan Douglas. He underwent surgery ten days later, and returned to action on 5 December, as a late substitute for Ryan Woods in a 2–0 victory over Milton Keynes Dons. After three further substitute appearances, Jota agreed to Brentford including an option to extend his contract to June 2018, as a precursor to his leaving the club on loan for personal reasons.

On 16 January 2016, Jota returned to Eibar, now playing in La Liga, on an 18-month loan. Eight days later, he made his first appearance in Spain's top division, replacing Saúl Berjón after 57 minutes of a 5–2 loss at Athletic Bilbao. He made 20 appearances without scoring over the second half of the 2015–16 season and the first half of 2016–17 before being recalled by Brentford.

Jota was recalled from loan by Brentford during the January 2017 transfer window, and made his first appearance on 7 January 2017 as a 61st-minute substitute for Nico Yennaris during a 5–1 FA Cup third round victory over Eastleigh. He scored the first goal since his return with a late consolation in a 2–1 defeat by Wigan Athletic two weeks later. A run of five goals in five games in February, which included his first hat-trick for the club, won Jota a nomination for the Championship Player of the Month award. He finished the season as Brentford's third-leading scorer behind Lasse Vibe and the departed Scott Hogan, with 12 goals from 23 appearances, and the club triggered the one-year option on his contract.

=== Birmingham City ===
Jota joined Championship club Birmingham City on 31 August 2017 on a four-year contract. The fee was undisclosed, but was confirmed by the club to be a new record, in excess of the £6 million they paid for Nikola Žigić in 2010. He was one of six debutants in the starting eleven for Birmingham's next fixture, away to Norwich City; he played the whole match as his team lost 1–0. Jota was substituted after 79 minutes of his second appearance with what appeared to be a hamstring strain. He returned to the starting eleven, but gradually lost the confidence of manager Steve Cotterill and played little after December. When Garry Monk took over as manager in March 2018, Jota returned to the team and started all the remaining matches as Birmingham avoided relegation. At the end of March, BBC Sport's reporter noted that "The most noticeable difference since Monk's appointment has been the greater influence of Spanish forward Jota, who struggled for goals following his club-record move from Brentford in August, but has been pivotal in Blues' successive wins either side of the international break."

He was a regular in the side throughout 2018–19, apart from time lost to a groin injury in mid-season, but his performances were inconsistent. He scored only three goals over the season, but provided eleven assists, and in October, created 19 chances for team-mates, four of which led to goals, and contributed to Lukas Jutkiewicz being named Championship Player of the Month.

=== Aston Villa ===
Jota signed for Birmingham's local rivals Aston Villa on 5 June 2019. He agreed a two-year contract with the newly promoted Premier League club, and was reunited with manager Dean Smith with whom he had worked at Brentford. On the same day, Gary Gardner moved in the opposite direction; the fees were undisclosed. He made his debut in Villa's opening fixture as a substitute for fellow new signing and debutant Trézéguet after an hour of a 3–1 defeat away to Tottenham Hotspur, and scored his first (and only) Aston Villa goal on 25 September in a 3–1 away victory against Brighton & Hove Albion in the EFL Cup.

On 3 October 2020, Jota left Villa after reaching an agreement for the termination of his contract.

=== Deportivo Alavés ===
On 4 October 2020, the day after his Aston Villa exit, Jota signed for La Liga club Deportivo Alavés on a one-year contract. He made his Alavés debut on 18 October, in a 2–0 home league defeat to Elche. He made 23 league appearances without scoring, and confirmed that he would leave the club when his contract expired at the end of the season.

=== Retirement ===
After leaving Alavés, he was close to joining a side in Saudi Arabia on a multi-year deal, but ultimately announced his retirement in October 2022, saying "in 2021, I lost the ambition I had in previous years and I didn't want that to happen. I wanted to keep in my memory how happy I have been for so many years."

== International career ==
Jota was called into the Galicia squad for a friendly match against Venezuela on 20 May 2016. His shot on goal from outside the box in the 37th minute was parried by goalkeeper Wuilker Faríñez and was scored by Iago Aspas, he was substituted for Joselu at half time during the 1–1 draw.

== Style of play ==
Jota was described as similar in style and movement to Spain international David Silva during his time at Eibar. He was described as having "real technical craft" by manager Mark Warburton upon signing for Brentford. His manager at both Aston Villa and Brentford, Dean Smith, described him as having "great ability, great balance and a great eye for both goals and assists".

== Personal life ==
Jota was born in A Pobra do Caramiñal, Province of A Coruña, the son of José Ignacio Peleteiro and his wife Lupe in a middle-class family. His father worked for savings bank Caixa Galicia before managing a financial services agency and other businesses. Interviewed in 2017, Jota said he was coached by his father at his first youth club, Xuventú Aguiño.

Jota married fashion model Jessica Bueno in June 2015, celebrating the wedding in Marbella after a civil ceremony in Pobra do Caramiñal. The couple have two sons, while Jessica has a son from an earlier relationship. In November 2022, the couple announced that they were filing for divorce. Jota said in 2025 that he agreed to pay €15,000 in child support per month despite not having the funds, as he would otherwise have been denied contact with his stepson.

In February 2024, it was announced that Jota converted to Islam. He was introduced to the religion through a friend from Kuwait. In June 2024, he married Ajla Eternovic of the Netherlands in Saudi Arabia; their first son was born later that year, while she had a son from a previous relationship. In 2025, Jota denied reports from sources including The New York Times that his companies in Saudi Arabia were worth over €700 million.

== Career statistics ==
As of end of 2020–21 season

Club	Season	League			National Cup		League Cup		Other		Total	
Club	Season	Division	Apps	Goals	Apps	Goals	Apps	Goals	Apps	Goals	Apps	Goals
Celta Vigo B	2010–11	Segunda División B	32	6	—		—		—		32	6
Celta Vigo B	2011–12	Segunda División B	36	16	—		—		—		36	16
Celta Vigo B	Total		68	22	—		—		—		68	22
Celta Vigo	2010–11	Segunda División	4	0	0	0	—		—		4	0
Celta Vigo	2011–12	Segunda División	0	0	1	0	—		—		1	0
Celta Vigo	2012–13	La Liga	0	0	0	0	—		—		0	0
Celta Vigo	2013–14	La Liga	0	0	0	0	—		—		0	0
Celta Vigo	Total		4	0	1	0	—		—		5	0
Real Madrid Castilla (loan)	2012–13	Segunda División	3	0	—		—		—		3	0
Eibar (loan)	2013–14	Segunda División	35	11	2	0	—		—		37	11
Brentford	2014–15	Championship	42	11	1	0	1	0	2 (Note: Appearances in Football League play-offs)	0	46	11
Brentford	2015–16	Championship	5	0	0	0	0	0	—		5	0
Brentford	2016–17	Championship	21	12	2	0	—		—		23	12
Brentford	2017–18	Championship	1	0	0	0	—		—		1	0
Brentford	Total		69	23	3	0	1	0	2	0	75	23
Eibar (loan)	2015–16	La Liga	13	0	—		—		—		13	0
Eibar (loan)	2016–17	La Liga	5	0	2	0	—		—		7	0
Eibar (loan)	Total		18	0	2	0	—		—		20	0
Birmingham City	2017–18	Championship	32	5	2	0	—		—		34	5
Birmingham City	2018–19	Championship	40	3	0	0	1	0	—		41	3
Birmingham City	Total		72	8	2	0	1	0	—		75	8
Aston Villa	2019–20	Premier League	10	0	1	0	3	1	—		14	1
Aston Villa	2020–21	Premier League	0	0	—		2	0	—		2	0
Aston Villa	Total		10	0	1	0	5	1	—		16	1
Deportivo Alavés	2020–21	La Liga	23	0	2	0	—		—		25	0
Career total			302	64	13	0	7	1	2	0	324	65

== Honours ==
Eibar

- Segunda División: 2013–14

Individual

- Segunda División Team of the Year: 2013–14
- Segunda División Player of the Month: February 2014
