= Ander Gayoso =

Spanish footballer

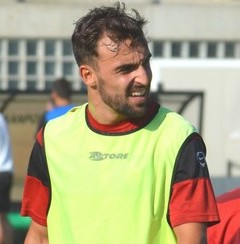

Personal information
- Full name: Ander Gayoso Reina
- Date of birth: 20 July 1993 (age 33)
- Place of birth: Ermua, Spain
- Height: 1.71 m (5 ft 7 1/2 in)
- Position: Left-back

Team information
- Current team: Leioa

Youth career
- Eibar

Senior career*
Years	Team	Apps	(Gls)
2012–2015	Eibar B	3	(0)
2012–2013	→ Elgoibar (loan)	31	(1)
2013–2014	→ Zamudio (loan)	30	(0)
2014–2015	→ Barakaldo (loan)	29	(0)
2015–2016	Vitoria	7	(0)
2016–2017	Eibar	1	(0)
2016–2017	→ Tudelano (loan)	3	(0)
2017–2019	Real Unión	33	(0)
2018–2019	→ Arenas Getxo (loan)	30	(1)
2019–2020	Langreo	23	(0)
2020–2021	Lealtad	21	(1)
2021–2022	Cacereño	30	(1)
2022	Talavera	5	(0)
2023–2024	Aurrerá Ondarroa	24	(0)
2024–	Leioa	4	(0)
- * Club domestic league appearances and goals as of 28 September 2024

Ander Gayoso Reina (born 20 July 1993) is a Spanish professional footballer who plays for Leioa as a left back.

== Club career ==
Born in Ermua, Biscay, Basque Country, Gayoso graduated with SD Eibar's youth setup, and made his debut as a senior with the reserves in 2012, in Tercera División. In July 2012, he was loaned to neighbouring CD Elgoibar, for one year.

On 23 July 2013, Gayoso joined Zamudio SD, also in the fourth tier, in a season-long loan deal. On 27 June of the following year, he signed a new two-year deal with the Armeros, and moved on loan to Segunda División B side Barakaldo CF on 4 August.

In June 2015, Gayoso was included in the Eibar's first team squad for pre-season, but suffered a severe knee injury on 4 August. Recovered from his injury in March 2016, he made his professional – and La Liga – debut on 29 April, coming on as a late substitute for Antonio Luna, in a 0–2 away loss against Sporting de Gijón.

On 13 July 2016, Gayoso was loaned to CD Tudelano in the third division, for one year.
