= Imanol Corral =

Spanish footballer

Personal information
- Full name: Imanol Corral Matellán
- Date of birth: 19 March 1994 (age 32)
- Place of birth: Basauri, Spain
- Height: 1.80 m (5 ft 11 in)
- Position: Left back

Team information
- Current team: Balmaseda

Youth career
- 2004–2013: Athletic Bilbao

Senior career*
Years	Team	Apps	(Gls)
2013–2015	Basconia	44	(0)
2015–2017	Vitoria	59	(1)
2016	Eibar	1	(0)
2017–	Balmaseda	0	(0)
- * Club domestic league appearances and goals as of 24 June 2017

Imanol Corral Matellán (born 19 March 1994) is a Spanish footballer who plays for SD Balmaseda FC as a left back.

== Club career ==
Born in Basauri, Biscay, Basque Country, Corral joined Athletic Bilbao's youth setup in 2004. Part of the Juvenil A team which played in the 2012-13 NextGen Series and were runners-up in the 2013 Copa del Rey Juvenil, he made his debut as a senior with the farm team CD Basconia in Tercera División, in 2013.

On 8 June 2015 Corral was released by the Lions, and subsequently joined Eibar's reserve team CD Vitoria. He made his first team – and La Liga – debut on 14 February of the following year, coming on as a late substitute for Takashi Inui in a 2–0 home win against Levante UD.

On 29 June 2017, Corral joined SD Balmaseda FC in the fourth division.
