= Gonzalo Escalante =

Argentine footballer (born 1993)

Personal information
- Date of birth: 27 March 1993 (age 33)
- Place of birth: Bella Vista, Argentina
- Height: 1.82 m (6 ft 0 in)
- Position: Defensive midfielder

Team information
- Current team: Deportes La Serena
- Number: 8

Youth career
- Boca Juniors

Senior career*
Years	Team	Apps	(Gls)
2013–2015	Boca Juniors	11	(0)
2014–2015	→ Catania (loan)	14	(1)
2015–2016	Catania	12	(0)
2015–2016	→ Eibar (loan)	17	(1)
2016–2020	Eibar	130	(9)
2020–2023	Lazio	25	(0)
2022	→ Alavés (loan)	17	(5)
2022–2023	→ Cremonese (loan)	9	(0)
2023	→ Cádiz (loan)	14	(3)
2023–2025	Cádiz	49	(2)
2026–	Deportes La Serena	21	(2)
- * Club domestic league appearances and goals as of 11:38, 29 October 2026 (UTC)

Gonzalo Escalante (born 27 March 1993) is an Argentine professional footballer who plays as a defensive midfielder for Chilean Primera División club Deportes La Serena.

== Career ==
=== Early career ===
Born in Bella Vista, Buenos Aires, Escalante finished his formation with Boca Juniors. He made his professional debut on 13 April 2013, coming on as a half-time substitute for Clemente Rodríguez in a 6–1 away loss against San Martín de San Juan for the Primera División championship.

On 28 August 2014, Escalante was loaned to Italian Serie B side Calcio Catania, in a season-long deal with a buyout clause. He scored his first professional goal on 28 October, netting the first in a 5–1 home routing of Virtus Entella.

On 29 January 2015, Escalante was bought outright by the Sicilians. He appeared in 26 matches and scored one goal during the campaign, as his side finished only 16th.

=== Eibar ===
On 16 July 2015, Escalante moved to La Liga side SD Eibar on loan for one year. He made his debut in the category on 24 August, starting and scoring the second in a 3–1 away win against Granada CF.

On 11 January 2016, Escalante joined the Armeros permanently, signing a contract until 2020.

=== Lazio ===
On 13 January 2020, Escalante reached an agreement with Lazio to join the club ahead of the 2020–21 season, penning a four-year contract.

==== Loan to Alavés ====
On 4 January 2022, Escalante returned to Spain and its top tier after agreeing to a loan deal with Deportivo Alavés.

==== Loan to Cremonese ====
On 9 August 2022, Escalante was loaned to Cremonese, with an option to buy.

=== Cádiz ===
On 25 January 2023, Escalante once again moved to Spain, joining Cádiz on loan. On 3 July, he signed a permanent three-year deal with the club, but rescinded his link on 30 August 2025.

=== Deportes La Serena ===
In January 2026, Escalante returned to South America and signed with Chilean Primera División club Deportes La Serena.

== Career statistics ==
As of match played 4 June 2023

Appearances and goals by club, season and competition
Club	Season	League			National cup		Continental		Total	
Club	Season	Division	Apps	Goals	Apps	Goals	Apps	Goals	Apps	Goals
Boca Juniors	2012–13	Argentine Primera División	6	0	–		–		6	0
Boca Juniors	2013–14	Argentine Primera Division	5	0	–		–		5	0
Boca Juniors	Total		11	0	–		–		11	0
Catania	2014–15	Serie B	26	1	0	0	–		26	1
Eibar	2015–16	La Liga	34	3	2	0	–		36	3
Eibar	2016–17	La Liga	30	2	5	0	–		35	2
Eibar	2017–18	La Liga	28	1	0	0	–		28	1
Eibar	2018–19	La Liga	32	4	0	0	–		32	4
Eibar	2019–20	La Liga	23	0	1	0	–		24	0
Eibar	Total		147	10	8	0	–		155	10
Lazio	2020–21	Serie A	24	0	2	0	4 (Note: Appearances in UEFA Champions League)	0	30	0
Lazio	2021–22	Serie A	1	0	0	0	0	0	1	0
Lazio	Total		25	0	2	0	4	0	31	0
Alavés (loan)	2021–22	La Liga	17	5	0	0	–		17	5
Cremonese (loan)	2022–23	Serie A	9	0	1	0	–		10	0
Cádiz (loan)	2022–23	La Liga	14	3	–		–		14	3
Career total			249	19	11	0	4	0	264	19
