= Borja González =

Spanish footballer (born 1995)

Personal information
- Full name: Borja González Tejeda
- Date of birth: 17 November 1995 (age 30)
- Place of birth: Madrid, Spain
- Height: 1.76 m (5 ft 9 in)
- Position: Right back

Team information
- Current team: OFI
- Number: 17

Youth career
- 2000–2011: Atlético Pinto
- 2011–2014: Rayo Vallecano

Senior career*
Years	Team	Apps	(Gls)
2014–2015	Atlético Pinto	17	(0)
2015	Atlético Madrid C	16	(2)
2015–2017	Atlético Madrid B	14	(0)
2017–2019	Atlético San Luis	24	(3)
2019	→ SS Reyes (loan)	11	(0)
2019–2020	Las Rozas	24	(3)
2020–2022	Rayo Majadahonda	53	(3)
2022–2024	Burgos	54	(1)
2024–	OFI	49	(5)
- * Club domestic league appearances and goals as of 20 September 2026

Borja González Tejeda (born 17 November 1995) is a Spanish footballer who plays as a right back for Greek Super League club OFI.

== Club career ==
Born in Pinto, Madrid, González was a Rayo Vallecano youth graduate. On 27 July 2014, he joined CA Pinto, club he already represented as a youth.

González made his senior debut on 7 September 2014, starting in a 0–1 Tercera División away loss against AD Alcorcón B. The following January, after being a regular starter, he moved to Atlético Madrid and was assigned to the C-team also in the fourth division.

González was promoted to the reserves following their relegation from Segunda División B, but was sparingly used. On 12 June 2017, he moved abroad for the first time in his career, joining Ascenso MX side Atlético San Luis.

González made his professional debut on 22 July 2017, starting in a 1–2 away loss against Alebrijes de Oaxaca. He scored his first goal six days later, netting the opener in a 2–0 home win against FC Juárez.

González returned to his home country on 30 January 2019, after agreeing to a six-month loan deal with UD San Sebastián de los Reyes. He subsequently represented neighbouring Las Rozas CF and CF Rayo Majadahonda, both in the third tier.

On 23 June 2022, González signed a two-year contract with Segunda División side Burgos CF. On 16 June 2024, he moved reached an agreement with OFI of the Super League Greece.

== Honours ==
OFI

- Greek Cup: 2025–26
- Greek Super Cup: 2026
