= Antonio Luna (footballer) =

Spanish footballer (born 1991)

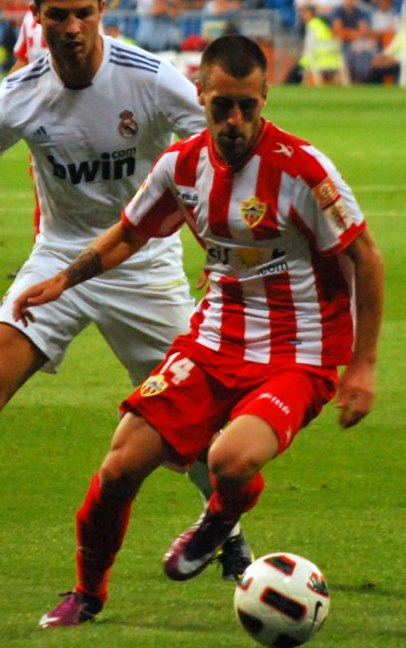
- Luna with Almería in 2011

Personal information
- Full name: Antonio Manuel Luna Rodríguez
- Date of birth: 17 March 1991 (age 35)
- Place of birth: Son Servera, Spain
- Height: 1.77 m (5 ft 10 in)
- Position: Left-back

Youth career
- 1998–2009: Sevilla

Senior career*
Years	Team	Apps	(Gls)
2009–2011	Sevilla B	32	(1)
2010–2013	Sevilla	21	(1)
2011	→ Almería (loan)	13	(0)
2013	→ Mallorca (loan)	11	(0)
2013–2015	Aston Villa	17	(1)
2014–2015	→ Hellas Verona (loan)	0	(0)
2015	→ Spezia (loan)	4	(0)
2015–2017	Eibar	41	(1)
2017–2020	Levante	39	(0)
2019–2020	→ Rayo Vallecano (loan)	21	(0)
2020–2021	Girona	19	(0)
2021–2022	Cartagena	12	(1)
2022–2024	Volos	59	(2)
2024–2025	Dinamo București	13	(0)
2025–2026	Antequera	11	(0)

International career
2007	Spain U16	1	(0)
2009	Spain U18	1	(0)
2009	Spain U19	3	(0)
2011	Spain U20	5	(0)
- * Club domestic league appearances and goals as of 13:45, 5 June 2026 (UTC)

Antonio Manuel Luna Rodríguez (born 17 March 1991) is a Spanish professional footballer who plays as a left-back.

Brought up at Sevilla, where he won the Copa del Rey in his second professional game in 2010, he also represented Almería, Mallorca, Eibar and Levante in La Liga, totalling 125 games. He had one season at Aston Villa in the Premier League, as well as playing in Italy and Greece.

== Club career ==
=== Sevilla ===
Born in Son Servera, Mallorca, Luna finished his youth career in Andalusia with Sevilla FC, making his senior debut with the reserves in the Segunda División B. On 15 and 19 May 2010, he appeared in his first two official games with the first team in the absence of the injured Fernando Navarro, and both were decisive ones: in the first, he featured the full 90 minutes as his team won 3–2 away against UD Almería in the last round, finally edging RCD Mallorca for the last qualification position for the UEFA Champions League. The second was a 2–0 victory over Atlético Madrid in the final of the Copa del Rey, again playing the full match.

Luna was loaned to neighbouring Almería on 19 January 2011, until the end of the campaign. He was regularly utilised, as the club suffered top-flight relegation after a four-year stay.

After returning to Sevilla, Luna took part in 14 league matches in 2011–12, his first full season. He scored his first goal as a professional in a 2–1 away defeat to Málaga CF on 29 January 2012, playing as a left midfielder.

On 25 November 2012, Luna was sent off despite being an unused substitute in a 4–0 loss at Atlético Madrid, in which his teammates Federico Fazio and Ivan Rakitić were also dismissed. He spent the second half of the 2012–13 season on loan to Mallorca in his native Balearic Islands, eventually meeting the same fate as with Almería.

=== Aston Villa ===
On 20 June 2013, Aston Villa announced the signing of Luna on a three-year deal. He started and scored on his Premier League debut with the club, a 3–1 win at Arsenal on 17 August.

On 5 August 2014, Luna was loaned to Serie A side Hellas Verona FC in a season-long loan. In February of the following year, having not made a single appearance, he was loaned to Spezia Calcio in Serie B for the second half of the campaign. In only his second match for his new team, he was sent off in a 3–2 home defeat of Modena FC.

=== Eibar ===
Luna signed a two-year deal with SD Eibar on 9 July 2015, after terminating his contract with Aston Villa. He made his debut for the Basques on 24 August, assisting goals by Adrián and Gonzalo Escalante as they began the new top-tier season with a 3–1 away victory against Granada CF.

He totalled 46 appearances in his two seasons at the club, scoring in a 3–2 win at Sporting de Gijón on 15 January 2017.

=== Levante ===
On 11 June 2017, Luna joined newly promoted side Levante UD for four years. On 29 August 2019, he was loaned to Segunda División's Rayo Vallecano for one year.

Luna terminated his contract on 29 September 2020.

=== Girona ===
On 30 September 2020, Luna agreed to a one-year deal with Girona FC in the second division. A backup to Enric Franquesa, he featured in 21 competitive matches as they missed out promotion in the play-offs.

=== Cartagena ===
On 7 July 2021, Luna signed a two-year contract with FC Cartagena also in the second tier. He scored on his debut on 16 August, albeit in a 3–1 home loss to his former club Almería.

With four muscular injuries, Luna played only 13 times for Efesé – four as a starter – while receiving negative attention for his high salary and poor conduct.

=== Volos ===
On 16 July 2022, Luna terminated his deal at Cartagena and moved to the third foreign country of his career, signing for Volos F.C. of Super League Greece. His former employers did not make any statement on his exit.

== Personal life ==
In October 2016, Luna and teammate Sergi Enrich apologised when a sex tape involving them and a woman went viral on the Internet. Due to the woman's lack of consent to filming, they were given two-year prison sentences in January 2021, suspended due to their lack of prior criminal records.

== In popular culture ==
Aston Villa fans nicknamed Luna "Tony Moon", a direct translation of his name from Spanish into English. Manager Paul Lambert admitted that he did not understand the nickname.

Luna was referenced in the 19th Jack Reacher novel Personal by Lee Child, an Aston Villa fan. There, character Casey Nice described him as a friend of hers, adding "I call him Tony Moon".

== Honours ==
Sevilla

- Copa del Rey: 2009–10
