= Iñigo Barrenetxea =

Spanish footballer

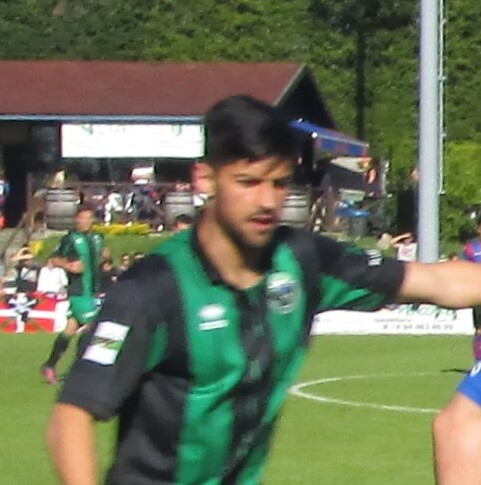
- Barrenetxea in 2017

Personal information
- Full name: Iñigo Barrenetxea García
- Date of birth: 10 January 1994 (age 32)
- Place of birth: Bilbao, Spain
- Height: 1.77 m (5 ft 10 in)
- Position: Attacking midfielder

Team information
- Current team: Atlètic Club d'Escaldes
- Number: 8

Youth career
- 2004–2006: Athletic Bilbao
- 2006–2013: Danok Bat

Senior career*
Years	Team	Apps	(Gls)
2013–2015	Basconia	62	(5)
2015–2016	Vitoria	14	(2)
2015–2017	Eibar	2	(0)
2016–2017	→ Sestao (loan)	32	(1)
2017	Bermeo	?	(1)
2017–2018	Zamudio	?	(2)
2018–2019	Lorca	33	(6)
2019–2020	Águilas	7	(2)
2020	Quintanar Rey	7	(0)
2020–2022	Águilas	37	(11)
2022	Pulpileño	17	(2)
2023	Racing Rioja	15	(1)
2023–	Atlètic Club d'Escaldes	57	(13)
- * Club domestic league appearances and goals as of 15 June 2026

Iñigo Barrenetxea García (born 10 January 1994) is a Spanish footballer who plays as an attacking midfielder for Atlètic Club d'Escaldes in Andorran Primera Divisió.

== Club career ==
Born in Bilbao, Biscay, Basque Country, Barrenetxea joined Athletic Bilbao's youth setup in 2004. Released in 2006, he finished his graduation with Danok Bat CF and subsequently returned to Athletic in the 2013 summer, being assigned to the farm team CD Basconia in Tercera División.

On 8 June 2015 Barrenetxea was released by the Lions, and subsequently joined SD Eibar's reserve team CD Vitoria, but spent the whole pre-season with the main squad. He made his first team – and La Liga – debut on 7 November, coming on as a late substitute for Gonzalo Escalante in a 3–1 home win against Getafe CF.

On 8 August 2016, Barrenetxea was loaned to Segunda División B side Sestao River Club, in a season-long deal. Upon returning he left the Armeros, and signed for fourth division club Bermeo FT on 18 November 2017.

In December 2017, Barrenetxea moved to fellow fourth division side Zamudio SD. The following 24 August, he joined Lorca FC also in the same category.
