= Iván Ramis =

Spanish footballer (born 1984)

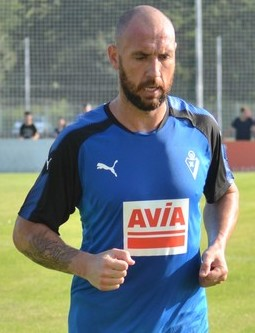
- Ramis with Eibar in 2017

Personal information
- Full name: Iván Andrés Ramis Barrios
- Date of birth: 25 October 1984 (age 42)
- Place of birth: Sa Pobla, Spain
- Height: 1.88 m (6 ft 2 in)
- Position: Centre-back

Youth career
- Mallorca

Senior career*
Years	Team	Apps	(Gls)
2001–2004	Mallorca B	49	(3)
2004–2012	Mallorca	164	(9)
2005–2006	→ Valladolid (loan)	30	(0)
2012–2015	Wigan Athletic	49	(4)
2015	Levante	13	(0)
2015–2020	Eibar	89	(7)
Total		394	(23)

International career
2003	Spain U19	2	(0)
2004	Spain U21	3	(0)
2005	Spain U23	4	(0)
- * Club domestic league appearances and goals

Iván Andrés Ramis Barrios (born 25 October 1984) is a Spanish former professional footballer who played as a central defender.

He spent most of his career with Mallorca since making his debut in 2004, appearing in 189 competitive matches over eight La Liga seasons. He also played three years in England with Wigan Athletic.

== Club career ==
=== Mallorca ===
Born in Sa Pobla, Balearic Islands, Ramis was a product of local RCD Mallorca's youth system, having made his debut for the first team in 2003–04, against Albacete Balompié on 15 February 2004 (0–0 La Liga home draw). After a loan at Real Valladolid from Segunda División in the 2005–06 season he developed as a player in 2007–08, scoring three league goals from a defensive position.

On 29 January 2010, Ramis was linked with a move to Scottish giants Celtic, although no agreement could be reached between the two clubs. He finished the campaign with 26 matches – and two red cards– as the side finished fifth and qualified for the UEFA Europa League.

=== Wigan Athletic ===
On 2 August 2012, Ramis signed for Wigan Athletic on a three-year contract after turning down an offer from fellow Premier League club West Ham United. He made his official debut on the 19th, playing the full 90 minutes in a 0–2 home loss against Chelsea and conceding the penalty that resulted in the last goal for the visitors, scored by Frank Lampard.

Ramis scored his first competitive goal for the Latics on 25 September 2012, a thunderous 20-yard strike after picking up the ball at the half-way line in a 4–1 away victory over West Ham United in the League Cup. He found the net against the same opposition one month later, scoring from a left-footed volley in the 2–1 league home win. He contributed 16 games and two goals in his debut season, but his team suffered relegation and he also endured a long spell on the sidelines due to a knee injury.

In late January 2015, with Wigan still in the Championship, Ramis had his contract cancelled by mutual consent.

=== Levante and Eibar ===
Shortly after leaving Wigan, Ramis returned to his country's top flight and signed an 18-month deal with Levante UD. He was released in June 2015, and moved to SD Eibar in the same league on 20 July.

On 20 July 2020, after struggling nearly the entire season with a knee injury, Ramis retired from football aged 35.

== Honours ==
Spain U23

- Mediterranean Games: 2005
