= Asier Etxaburu =

Spanish footballer

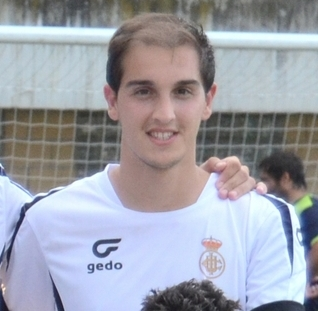
- Etxaburu with Real Unión in 2018

Personal information
- Full name: Asier Etxaburu Diz
- Date of birth: 7 April 1994 (age 32)
- Place of birth: Ondarroa, Spain
- Height: 1.82 m (5 ft 11 1/2 in)
- Position: Winger

Team information
- Current team: Atlético Paso
- Number: 23

Youth career
- 2004–2007: Athletic Bilbao
- 2007–2009: Aurrerá Ondarroa
- 2009–2010: Eibar
- 2010–2013: Athletic Bilbao

Senior career*
Years	Team	Apps	(Gls)
2013–2015	Basconia	55	(6)
2015–2018	Vitoria	91	(18)
2015	Eibar	0	(0)
2018–2020	Real Unión	55	(7)
2020–2022	Amorebieta	44	(5)
2022–2023	Talavera	9	(1)
2023	Portugalete	13	(3)
2023–2024	Zamora	29	(4)
2024–	Atlético Paso	3	(0)
- * Club domestic league appearances and goals as of 6 October 2024

Asier Etxaburu Diz (born 7 April 1994) is a Spanish footballer who plays for Atlético Paso as a winger.

== Club career ==
Born in Ondarroa, Biscay, Basque Country, Etxaburu joined Athletic Bilbao's youth setup in 2004. Released in 2007, he subsequently represented CD Aurrerá Ondarroa and SD Eibar before returning to Athletic in 2010 along with his twin brother Jon, a striker. Part of the Juvenil A team which played in the 2012-13 NextGen Series and were runners-up in the 2013 Copa del Rey Juvenil, he made his debut as a senior with the farm team CD Basconia in Tercera División, in 2013.

After two seasons at Basconia, on 8 June 2015 Etxaburu was released by the Lions and subsequently joined Eibar's reserve team CD Vitoria, but spent the whole pre-season with the main squad. He made his first team debut on 16 December, starting in a 4–0 Copa del Rey home routing of SD Ponferradina.

On 10 July 2018, Etxaburu signed for Real Unión in Segunda División B. On 20 July 2020, he moved to fellow league team SD Amorebieta, and was a regular starter as the club achieved a first-ever promotion to Segunda División.

On 9 September 2024, Etxaburu signed with Segunda Federación club Atlético Paso.
