= Sergi Enrich =

Spanish footballer (born 1990)

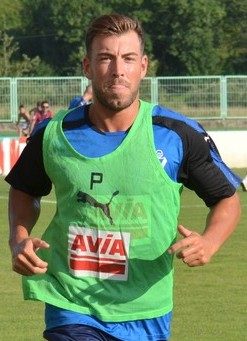
- Enrich with Eibar in 2017

Personal information
- Full name: Sergi Enrich Ametller
- Date of birth: 26 February 1990 (age 36)
- Place of birth: Ciutadella, Spain
- Height: 1.81 m (5 ft 11 in)
- Position: Forward

Team information
- Current team: Huesca
- Number: 9

Youth career
- Mallorca

Senior career*
Years	Team	Apps	(Gls)
2008–2011	Mallorca B	83	(30)
2010–2013	Mallorca	6	(0)
2011–2012	→ Recreativo (loan)	27	(7)
2012–2013	→ Alcorcón (loan)	22	(3)
2013–2015	Numancia	76	(26)
2015–2021	Eibar	187	(34)
2021–2022	Ponferradina	31	(6)
2022–2023	Oviedo	34	(7)
2023–2025	Zaragoza	32	(2)
2024–2025	→ Huesca (loan)	37	(7)
2025–	Huesca	44	(4)

International career
2008–2009	Spain U19	4	(1)
- * Club domestic league appearances and goals as of 03:08, 11 November 2026 (UTC)

Sergi Enrich Ametller (born 26 February 1990) is a Spanish professional footballer who plays as a forward for Primera Federación club Huesca.

He made 197 total appearances for Eibar, scoring 39 goals. In La Liga, he also represented Mallorca, where he started his career.

== Club career ==
=== Mallorca ===
Enrich was born in Ciutadella de Menorca, Menorca, Balearic Islands. A product of RCD Mallorca's youth ranks, he made his first-team – and La Liga – debut on 24 January 2010, playing the last 22 minutes in a 1–1 away draw against RCD Espanyol after coming on as a substitute for Fernando Varela. He spent the vast majority of his first professional season with the reserve team in the Segunda División B.

Enrich spent 2011–12 on loan to Segunda División club Recreativo de Huelva. The following campaign, he joined AD Alcorcón on the same basis.

=== Numancia ===
In summer 2013, Enrich signed a two-year contract with CD Numancia still in the second tier. He was the Segunda División Player of the Month in November 2014 as his five goals in four games took the Soria-based side out of the relegation places; on 20 December that year, he contributed a brace to a 6–6 home draw against CD Lugo.

=== Eibar ===
On 12 July 2015, Enrich moved to top-division SD Eibar after agreeing to a two-year deal. He scored 11 goals during his second season to help to a tenth-place finish, and was La Liga Player of the Month in February 2017.

Enrich remained at the Basque club in the ensuing seasons, signing new contracts in February 2017 and May 2019, tying him to them until June 2022. Due to a clause in his contract allowing him to leave Eibar in case of relegation, he ended his six-year stay in June 2021; two months later, he was close to joining newly-relegated 2. Bundesliga team FC Schalke 04 in Germany, but the move was called off when fans rebelled over his criminal record.

=== Ponferradina ===
On 22 September 2021, Enrich agreed to a deal at SD Ponferradina, recently returned to the second tier. He contributed six goals and as many assists in his only campaign, and then turned down a new contract.

=== Later career ===
Enrich continued to compete in division two subsequently, representing Real Oviedo– where he was voted Player of the Month in April 2023,– Real Zaragoza and SD Huesca.

== Personal life ==
In October 2016, Enrich and teammate Antonio Luna apologised when a sex tape involving them and a woman went viral on the Internet. Due to the woman's lack of consent to the filming, the pair were given two-year prison sentences in January 2021, suspended due to their lack of prior criminal records.
