= David Fernández Borbalán =

Spanish football referee

- Born: 30 May 1973 (age 53); Almería, Spain

Domestic
Years	League	Role
2004–2018	La Liga	Referee

International
Years	League	Role
2010–2018	FIFA listed	Referee

David Fernández Borbalán (born 30 May 1973) is a retired Spanish football referee. His first match officiating in La Liga was on 12 September 2004, between Levante UD and Racing de Santander. Borbalán also refereed a key match in Synot liga season 2014–15 between AC Sparta Prague and FC Viktoria Plzeň on 9 May 2015.

He was chosen, upon validation from FIFA, to referee the 2018 Greek Cup Final between AEK and PAOK at the Olympic Stadium in Athens, amidst concerns over supporter riots and violence during the game and despite protests by Greek football chairmen and refereeing bodies over the appointment of non-Greek officials. Two weeks later, he took charge of his final La Liga fixture, a 1–0 win for RCD Espanyol over Athletic Bilbao at San Mamés in a match which meant little to the fortunes of the teams involved but was played at a venue specified as being preferred by the referee for his last appointment.
