= Adrián González (footballer, born 1988) =

Spanish footballer (born 1988)

Adrián
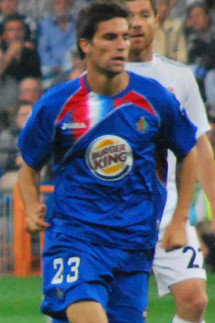
- Adrián with Getafe in 2009

Personal information
- Full name: Adrián González Morales
- Date of birth: 25 May 1988 (age 38)
- Place of birth: Madrid, Spain
- Height: 1.83 m (6 ft 0 in)
- Position: Midfielder

Youth career
- 1997–2006: Real Madrid

Senior career*
Years	Team	Apps	(Gls)
2006–2008	Real Madrid B	38	(5)
2007–2008	→ Celta (loan)	3	(0)
2008	→ Gimnàstic (loan)	18	(2)
2008–2010	Getafe	30	(1)
2010–2012	Racing Santander	58	(3)
2012–2014	Rayo Vallecano	38	(1)
2014–2015	Elche	28	(0)
2015–2017	Eibar	60	(12)
2017–2020	Málaga	99	(19)
2020–2022	Zaragoza	37	(3)
2022	Fuenlabrada	13	(1)
Total		422	(47)

International career
2004	Spain U16	4	(1)
2004–2005	Spain U17	7	(3)
2006–2007	Spain U19	6	(3)
2007	Spain U20	2	(0)
2009	Spain U21	1	(0)

Managerial career
- 2022–2023: Olympiacos (assistant)
- 2023–2025: Al Qadsiah (assistant)
- * Club domestic league appearances and goals

Adrián González Morales (born 25 May 1988), known simply as Adrián, is a Spanish former professional footballer who played as a central midfielder.

His career was spent mostly in La Liga, where he totalled 243 games in service of Getafe, Racing de Santander, Rayo Vallecano, Elche, Eibar and Málaga (20 goals), adding 179 in the Segunda División for six teams.

== Club career ==
A product of Real Madrid's youth system, Madrid-born Adrián spent 2006–07 with the reserves Real Madrid Castilla where he was trained by his father, former club legend Míchel. He then served two Segunda División loans the following season, with RC Celta de Vigo and Gimnàstic de Tarragona, being sparingly used by both sides.

In late May 2008, Adrián was bought by another team from the capital, Getafe CF, with Real Madrid having the option to re-buy the player. He made his competitive debut on 5 October, playing 15 minutes in a 2–2 home draw against UD Almería. Midway through the campaign, he would be again coached by his father after the dismissal of Víctor Muñoz.

Adrián started in many games of 2009–10, which brought heavy criticism on coach Míchel, who was accused of nepotism. He lost his starting position midway through the season but eventually returned, scoring his first goal in La Liga on 25 April 2010 as Getafe downed Sevilla FC 4–3 at home – he also provided an assist in the match– and completed the last three fixtures as the club collected seven points and qualified for the UEFA Europa League as sixth.

In mid-August 2010, Adrián terminated his contract and joined Racing de Santander in the same league. A starter throughout most of the campaign although he rarely finished a match, he made his official debut with the Cantabrians on 29 August in a 0–3 home loss against FC Barcelona.

After his team's relegation in 2012, Adrián went back to his hometown and signed a two-year deal at Rayo Vallecano. Mainly a substitute in his first year, he scored his first goal on 25 September 2013 in a 4–1 defeat at Sevilla, adding two more on 19 December in the 3–1 win over Real Valladolid in the Copa del Rey.

On 26 June 2014, Adrián joined Elche CF for two years. Following their administrative relegation from the top flight, he took part in pre-season before cutting ties in mid-August 2015, linking with SD Eibar for the next three years. He scored five goals in his first season in the Basque Country, including one on his debut in a 3–1 away victory against Granada CF.

Adrián reunited with his father at Málaga CF on 23 May 2017, after agreeing to a three-year contract with the option for a further season. With the Andalusians back in division two in the 2018–19 campaign, the competent penalty taker scored a career-best ten goals.

On 7 September 2020, Adrián signed a two-year deal with Real Zaragoza also of the second tier. He became a free agent 20 January 2022 and, the following day, the 33-year-old joined fellow second division side CF Fuenlabrada on a short-term contract.

Adrián retired in summer 2022. In 2022–23, he was part of his father's coaching staff at Super League Greece club Olympiacos FC. The pair then worked together in Saudi Arabia with Al Qadsiah FC.

== International career ==
Adrián won his only cap for the Spain under-21 team on 10 February 2009, as a 70th-minute substitute for Diego Capel in the 1–1 friendly draw with Norway in Cartagena.

== Career statistics ==
As of 22 May 2011

Club performance			League		Cup		Continental		Total	
Season	Club	League	Apps	Goals	Apps	Goals	Apps	Goals	Apps	Goals
Spain			League		Copa del Rey		Europe		Total	
2006–07	Real Madrid B	Segunda División	38	5	-	-	-	-	38	5
2007–08	Celta	Segunda División	3	0	-	-	-	-	3	0
2007–08	Gimnàstic	Segunda División	18	2	-	-	-	-	18	2
2008–09	Getafe	La Liga	5	0	-	-	-	-	5	0
2009–10	Getafe	La Liga	25	1	-	-	-	-	25	1
2010–11	Racing Santander	La Liga	23	0	-	-	-	-	23	0
Total	Spain		102	8					102	8
Career total			102	8					102	8
