= 2018–19 Elche CF season =

Elche CF
2018–19 season
- President: Juan Serrano
- Head coach: Pacheta
- Stadium: Martínez Valero
- Segunda División: 11th
- Copa del Rey: Second round
- Top goalscorer: League: Sory Kaba (8); All: Sory Kaba (8)
- Highest home attendance: 12,868 vs Albacete
- Lowest home attendance: 5,301 vs Córdoba
- Average home league attendance: 9,070
- Biggest win: 3–0 vs Tenerife
- Biggest defeat: 5–1 vs Cádiz; 4–0 vs Deportivo La Coruña
Home colours	Away colours

The 2018–19 season was Elche Club de Fútbol's 96th season in existence. In addition to the domestic league, Elche participated in this season's edition of the Copa del Rey. The season covers the period from 1 July 2018 to 30 June 2019.

== Players ==
=== Current squad ===
As of 14 February 2019.

Note: Flags indicate national team as defined under FIFA eligibility rules; some limited exceptions apply. Players may hold more than one non-FIFA nationality.

No.	Pos.	Nation	Player
1	GK	ESP	José Juan
2	DF	ESP	Tekio
3	DF	ESP	Manu
4	DF	COL	Neyder Lozano
5	DF	ESP	Gonzalo Verdú
6	MF	ESP	Manuel Sánchez
7	FW	ESP	Nino
8	MF	ESP	Alfred Planas (on loan from Alcorcón)
10	MF	ESP	Gonzalo Villar
11	MF	ESP	Iván Sánchez
12	DF	ESP	Dani Calvo (on loan from Numancia)
13	GK	ESP	Édgar Badía

No.	Pos.	Nation	Player
14	MF	ESP	Xavi Torres
15	MF	FRA	Karim Azamoum (on loan from Cádiz)
16	MF	ESP	Nacho Gil (on loan from Valencia)
17	MF	ESP	Josan
18	DF	ESP	Jesús Olmo
19	FW	ESP	Carlos Castro (on loan from Mallorca)
20	MF	ESP	Jony Ñíguez
21	MF	ESP	Javi Flores
22	MF	ESP	Borja Martínez
23	DF	ESP	Juan Cruz
24	DF	VEN	Alexander González
25	FW	MAR	Yacine Qasmi

=== Reserve team ===
Note: Flags indicate national team as defined under FIFA eligibility rules; some limited exceptions apply. Players may hold more than one non-FIFA nationality.

No.	Pos.	Nation	Player
27	DF	ESP	Óscar Gil
28	GK	ESP	Luis Castillo

No.	Pos.	Nation	Player
29	FW	ESP	Nacho Ramón
30	MF	ESP	César Moreno

=== Out on loan ===
Note: Flags indicate national team as defined under FIFA eligibility rules; some limited exceptions apply. Players may hold more than one non-FIFA nationality.

No.	Pos.	Nation	Player
—	DF	ESP	Primi (at Alcoyano until 30 June 2019)
—	DF	UKR	Ivan Zotko (at Lleida Esportiu until 30 June 2019)
—	MF	ESP	Iván Calero (at Salmantino until 30 June 2019)
—	MF	ESP	Juanjo Collantes (at UCAM Murcia until 30 June 2019)
—	MF	ESP	Daniel Provencio (at Ibiza until 30 June 2019)

No.	Pos.	Nation	Player
—	MF	ESP	Nando Quesada (at Sanluqueño until 30 June 2019)
—	MF	ESP	Alberto Rubio (at Alcoyano until 30 June 2019)
—	FW	ESP	Benja (at Hércules until 30 June 2019)
—	FW	ESP	Lolo Plá (at Recreativo until 30 June 2019)
—	FW	ESP	Claudio Medina (at Mirandés until 30 June 2019)

== Transfers ==
=== In ===
Date	Player	From	Type	Fee	Ref
26 June 2018	(Spain) Iván Sánchez	(Spain) Albacete	Transfer	€150K	
5 August 2018	(Venezuela) Alexander González	(Spain) Huesca	Transfer	Free	
24 August 2018	(Nigeria) Francis Uzoho	(Spain) Deportivo La Coruña	Loan		
27 December 2018	(Spain) Nacho Gil	(Spain) Valencia	Loan		
5 January 2019	(Spain) Édgar Badía	(Spain) Reus	Transfer	Free	

=== Out ===
Date	Player	To	Type	Fee	Ref
26 June 2018	(Spain) Iván Sánchez	(Spain) Albacete	Loan return		

== Pre-season and friendlies ==
Win Draw Loss

21 July 2018 Friendly	Elche (Spain)	4–0	(Spain) Intercity	Santa Pola, Spain
19:30 CEST (UTC+2)	Josan 34'; I. Sánchez 43'; Lolo 56'; Sory 80'	Report		Stadium: Estadio Manolo Macia

22 July 2018 Friendly	CFI Alicante (Spain)	0–2	(Spain) Elche	Alicante, Spain
20:00 CEST (UTC+2)		Report	Sory 14'; Collantes 58'	Stadium: Estadio Antonio Solana

28 July 2018 Friendly	Elche (Spain)	1–3	(Spain) Cádiz	San Pedro del Pinatar, Spain
19:30 CEST (UTC+2)	Flores 22'		Álex 66' (pen.); Vallejo 69'; Barco 85'	Stadium: Pinatar Arena Football Center

29 July 2018 Friendly	Alcoyano (Spain)	2–2 (5–4 p)	(Spain) Elche	Alcoy, Spain
20:30 CEST (UTC+2)	Barreda 5'; Rubio 46'		Nino 31' (pen.); Flores 68'	Stadium: Estadio El Collao

4 August 2018 Friendly	Albacete (Spain)	1–2	(Spain) Elche	San Pedro del Pinatar, Spain
19:30 CEST (UTC+2)	Bela 3'		Benja 24'; Villar 38'	Stadium: Pinatar Arena Football Center

5 August 2018 Friendly	Elche (Spain)	0–0	(Spain) Granada	Orihuela, Spain
19:30 CEST (UTC+2)				Stadium: Nuevo Campo del Campoamor Golf Resort

10 August 2018 Friendly	Elche (Spain)	1–0	(Spain) Almería	Elche, Spain
20:45 CEST (UTC+2)	Villar 67'	Report		Stadium: Martínez Valero; Attendance: 7,577; Referee: Isidro Díaz de Mera Escuderos

9 January 2019 Friendly	Crevillente (Spain)	1–1 (3–5 p)	(Spain) Elche	Crevillente, Spain
19:15 CET (UTC+1)	Samuel 30'		Sory 18'	Stadium: Estadio Enrique Miralles

2 February 2019 Friendly	Elche (Spain)	0–2	(Russia) Zenit Saint Petersburg	Elche, Spain
12:00 CET (UTC+1)				Stadium: Martínez Valero

20 March 2019 Friendly	Elche (Spain)	3–0	(Russia) Leningradets Leningrad Oblast	La Nucía, Spain
11:30 CET (UTC+1)				Stadium: Estadi Olímpic Camilo Cano

== Competitions ==
=== Overview ===
Competition	First match	Last match	Starting round	Final position	Record							
Competition	First match	Last match	Starting round	Final position	Pld	W	D	L	GF	GA	GD	Win %
Segunda División	17 August 2018	8 June 2019	Matchday 1	11th	42	13	16	13	49	52	−3	30.95
Copa del Rey	13 September 2018	16 October 2018	Second round	Third round	2	1	0	1	3	5	−2	50.00
Total					44	14	16	14	52	57	−5	31.82

Source: Soccerway

=== Segunda División ===
==== League table ====
Pos	Team	Pld	W	D	L	GF	GA	GD	Pts
9	Sporting Gijón	42	16	13	13	43	38	+5	61
10	Almería	42	15	15	12	51	39	+12	60
11	Elche	42	13	16	13	49	52	−3	55
12	Las Palmas	42	12	18	12	48	50	−2	54
13	Extremadura	42	14	11	17	43	47	−4	53

Source: La Liga
Rules for classification: 1) points; 2) head-to-head points; 3) head-to-head goal difference; 4) goal difference; 5) number of goals scored

==== Results summary ====
Overall								Home						Away					
Pld	W	D	L	GF	GA	GD	Pts	W	D	L	GF	GA	GD	W	D	L	GF	GA	GD
42	13	16	13	49	52	−3	55	10	7	4	25	14	+11	3	9	9	24	38	−14

Source: La Liga SmartBank

==== Results by round ====
Round	1	2	3	4	5	6	7	8	9	10	11	12	13	14	15	16	17	18	19	20	21	22	23	24	25	26	27	28	29	30	31	32	33	34	35	36	37	38	39	40	41	42
Ground	H	A	H	A	H	A	A	H	A	H	H	A	H	A	H	A	H	A	H	A	H	A	H	A	H	H	A	A	H	A	H	A	H	A	H	A	H	A	H	A	H	A
Result	D	D	L	L	D	D	D	W	L	W	W	L	D	L	L	D	D	W	D	L	W	L	D	W	L	W	D	D	W	L	W	W	W	D	L	D	W	L	W	D	D	L
Position	16	12	17	18	20	21	20	16	19	17	11	14	15	16	19	18	18	15	15	17	13	15	17	18	15	15	14	14	13	14	13	12	11	12	12	12	12	12	11	11	11	11

Source: La Liga SmartBank
A = Away; H = Home; W = Win; D = Draw; L = Loss

==== Matches ====
The league fixtures were announced on 24 July 2018.

17 August 2018 1	Elche	0–0	Granada	Elche
19:00 CEST (UTC+2)	Villar (yellow card) 41'; Gonzalo (yellow card) 76'	Report	Aguirre (yellow card) 18'; Quini (yellow card) 82'; Martínez (yellow card) 90+1'	Stadium: Martínez Valero; Attendance: 11,026; Referee: Santiago Varón Aceitón

26 August 2018 2	Osasuna	1–1	Elche	Pamplona
19:30 CEST (UTC+2)	Unai (yellow card) 44'; D. García (yellow card) 52' (yellow-red card) 54'; Villar 62'	Report	Tekio (yellow card) 34'; Gonzalo (yellow card) 61'; Sory 76'; Torres (yellow card) 88'	Stadium: El Sadar; Attendance: 14,108; Referee: Daniel Ocón Arráiz

1 September 2018 3	Elche	0–2	Reus	Elche
18:00 CEST (UTC+2)	Manu (yellow card) 81'; Gonzalo (yellow card) 89'; Torres (yellow card) 90+1'	Report	Carbià 19'; Herrera (yellow card) 41'; Ortiz (yellow card) 50'; Ledes (yellow card) 56'; Carbonell 71', (yellow card) 78'	Stadium: Martínez Valero; Attendance: 10,639; Referee: Javier Iglesias Villanueva

9 September 2018 4	Numancia	1–0	Elche	Soria
16:00 CEST (UTC+2)	Guillermo 30' (pen.); Ripa (yellow card) 64'	Report	Manuel (yellow card) 41'; Nino (yellow card) 45+2'	Stadium: Los Pajaritos; Attendance: 2,914; Referee: Álvaro Moreno Aragón

16 September 2018 5	Elche	1–1	Mallorca	Elche
12:00 CEST (UTC+2)	Neyder (yellow card) 24'; Sory 53'	Report	Raíllo (yellow card) 25'; Ruiz (yellow card) 27'; Abdón 38', (yellow card) 54' (yellow-red card) 89'; Pedraza (yellow card) 59'	Stadium: Martínez Valero; Attendance: 8,013; Referee: Luis Mario Milla Alvendiz

23 September 2018 6	Oviedo	1–1	Elche	Oviedo
16:00 CEST (UTC+2)	Joselu 24'; Ñíguez (yellow card) 87'	Report	Manuel 5', (yellow card) 54'; Neyder (yellow card) 76'	Stadium: Carlos Tartiere; Attendance: 14,050; Referee: Abraham Domínguez Cervantes

30 September 2018 7	Extremadura	2–2	Elche	Almendralejo
20:00 CEST (UTC+2)	Gallego 18' (pen.); Valverde 33' (pen.); Díez (yellow card) 38'; Chuli (yellow card) 55'	Report	Manuel (yellow card) 17' (yellow-red card) 32'; Gonzalo (yellow card) 68'; Sory (yellow card) 78', (goal) 82', 87'	Stadium: Francisco de la Hera; Attendance: 9,723; Referee: Santiago Varón Aceitón

7 October 2018 8	Elche	2–1	Lugo	Elche
18:00 CEST (UTC+2)	Neyder (yellow card) 10'; I. Sánchez (yellow card) 33'; Manuel (yellow card) 61'; Sory 18', 74'	Report	Josete (yellow card) 15'; Lazo 72'	Stadium: Martínez Valero; Attendance: 10,676; Referee: César Soto Grado

12 October 2018 9	Deportivo La Coruña	4–0	Elche	A Coruña
21:00 CEST (UTC+2)	Fernández 38', 61', 63'; Simón (yellow card) 56'; Valle 83'	Report	Nino (yellow card) 82'; Neyder (yellow card) 87'	Stadium: Abanca-Riazor; Attendance: 17,165; Referee: Valentín Pizarro Gómez

19 October 2018 10	Elche	2–0	Málaga	Elche
21:00 CEST (UTC+2)	Neyder 36'; Borja 63'; Manuel (yellow card) 68'; Benja (yellow card) 88'	Report	Ricca (yellow card) 62'	Stadium: Martínez Valero; Attendance: 9,084; Referee: Juan Luis Pulido Santana

28 October 2018 11	Elche	2–0	Zaragoza	Elche
20:30 CET (UTC+1)	Gonzalo 10'; Flores (yellow card) 34'; Nino 66'; Neyder (yellow card) 79'	Report	Raí (yellow card) 90+3'	Stadium: Martínez Valero; Attendance: 9,316; Referee: Jorge Figueroa Vázquez

4 November 2018 12	Cádiz	5–1	Elche	Cádiz
12:00 CET (UTC+1)	Oliván (yellow card) 19'; S. Sánchez (yellow card) 24'; Rober 50'; Lekić 63'; José Mari 68' (pen.); Salvi 73'; Vallejo 75'	Report	Sory 10'; Cruz (yellow card) 27'; Manuel (yellow card) 31'; Tekio (yellow card) 33'; Flores (yellow card) 80'; González (yellow card) 81'; Borja (yellow card) 84'	Stadium: Ramón de Carranza; Attendance: 12,785; Referee: Gorka Sagués Oscoz

10 November 2018 13	Elche	0–0	Las Palmas	Elche
20:30 CET (UTC+1)	Gonzalo (yellow card) 16'; Manuel (yellow card) 30'; Neyder (yellow card) 36'; Flores (yellow card) 73'; Tekio (yellow card) 87'	Report	Deivid (yellow card) 38'	Stadium: Martínez Valero; Attendance: 9,769; Referee: Isidro Díaz de Mera Escuderos

18 November 2018 14	Alcorcón	1–0	Elche	Alcorcón
18:00 CET (UTC+1)	Jonathan (yellow card) 63'; Burgos (yellow card) 77', (goal) 90+5'	Report	Tekio (yellow card) 19'; Villar (yellow card) 32'; Manuel (yellow card) 82'	Stadium: Santo Domingo; Attendance: 2,171; Referee: César Soto Grado

25 November 2018 15	Elche	0–1	Albacete	Elche
18:00 CET (UTC+1)	Gonzalo (yellow card) 14'; Cruz (yellow card) 19'; Sory (yellow card) 29'; I. Sánchez (yellow card) 40'; Neyder (yellow card) 69'	Report	Eugeni (yellow card) 7'; Susaeta 17'; Tejero (yellow card) 37'; Arroyo (yellow card) 39'; Zozulya (red card) 42'	Stadium: Martínez Valero; Attendance: 12,868; Referee: Luis Mario Milla Alvendiz

1 December 2018 16	Córdoba	1–1	Elche	Córdoba
16:00 CET (UTC+1)	Loureiro (yellow card) 17'; Galán (yellow card) 25'; Touré (yellow card) 75'; De las Cuevas 83'	Report	Torres (yellow card) 30'; I. Sánchez 44'; Cruz (yellow card) 80'; Josan (yellow card) 82' (yellow-red card) 90'; Villar (yellow card) 85'	Stadium: El Arcángel; Attendance: 9,875; Referee: José Antonio López Toca

9 December 2018 17	Elche	0–0	Sporting Gijón	Elche
18:00 CET (UTC+1)	Gonzalo (yellow card) 8'; Sory (yellow card) 33'; Borja (yellow card) 40'; Neyder (yellow card) 69'; Provencio (yellow card) 86'	Report	Sousa (yellow card) 36'; Salvador (yellow card) 67'; Cordero (yellow card) 77'	Stadium: Martínez Valero; Attendance: 10,156; Referee: Valentín Pizarro Gómez

16 December 2018 18	Rayo Majadahonda	1–3	Elche	Majadahonda
12:00 CET (UTC+1)	Verdés (yellow card) 5'; A. García 74'; Aitor (yellow card) 90+2'	Report	Neyder (yellow card) 34'; Manuel (yellow card) 55'; Luso 57' (o.g.); I. Sánchez 59'; Sory 90+3'	Stadium: Cerro del Espino; Attendance: 1,764; Referee: Rubén Ávalos Barrera

22 December 2018 19	Elche	2–2	Almería	Elche
20:00 CET (UTC+1)	Flores 4', (yellow card) 81'; Manuel (yellow card) 20'; I. Sánchez (yellow card) 40'; Benja (yellow card) 56'; González (yellow card) 63'; Torres 74' (pen.), (yellow card) 88'	Report	Arzura (yellow card) 29'; Álvaro 54'; Juan Carlos 64'	Stadium: Martínez Valero; Attendance: 7,466; Referee: Óliver de la Fuente Ramos

4 January 2019 20	Tenerife	2–1	Elche	Santa Cruz de Tenerife
21:00 CET (UTC+1)	Malbašić 23', (yellow card) 66'; Alberto (yellow card) 43'; Jorge (yellow card) 48', (goal) 60'; Suso (yellow card) 65'; Undabarrena (yellow card) 73'	Report	Villar (yellow card) 36'; Calvo (yellow card) 39'; Torres 44' (pen.); Cruz (yellow card) 90+2'; Neyder (yellow card) 90+3'	Stadium: Heliodoro Rodríguez López; Attendance: 9,818; Referee: Iñaki Vicandi Garrido

13 January 2019 21	Elche	1–0	Gimnàstic	Elche
20:00 CET (UTC+1)	Gonzalo (yellow card) 49'; I. Sánchez 59'; Manuel (yellow card) 71'; Cruz (yellow card) 90+3'	Report	Fali (red card) 29'; Suárez (yellow card) 71'; Thioune (yellow card) 83'; Abraham (yellow card) 90'	Stadium: Martínez Valero; Attendance: 7,249; Referee: Javier Iglesias Villanueva

21 January 2019 22	Granada	2–1	Elche	Granada
21:00 CET (UTC+1)	Montoro 17', 44', (yellow card) 42'; Fede (yellow card) 25'	Report	González (yellow card) 29'; Gonzalo (yellow card) 36'; Torres 71' (pen.); Sory (yellow card) 90+2'	Stadium: Nuevo Los Cármenes; Attendance: 8,328; Referee: César Soto Grado

26 January 2019 23	Elche	1–1	Numancia	Elche
18:00 CET (UTC+1)	Gonzalo (yellow card) 10'; Nino 34'; Azamoum (yellow card) 47'	Report	Diamanka 45'; Mateu (yellow card) 90+2'	Stadium: Martínez Valero; Attendance: 9,683; Referee: Aitor Gorostegui Fernández-Ortega

3 February 2019 24	Reus	0–1	Elche	Reus
18:00 CET (UTC+1)		Report		Stadium: Estadi Municipal

9 February 2019 25	Elche	1–2	Oviedo	Elche
18:00 CET (UTC+1)	Olmo (yellow card) 29'; Nino 70'; Cruz (yellow card) 90+4'	Report	J. Hernández (yellow card) 8'; Folch (yellow card) 16'; C. Hernández (yellow card) 44'; Joselu 53'; Toché 90+5' (pen.)	Stadium: Martínez Valero; Attendance: 9,331; Referee: Dámaso Arcediano Monescillo

16 February 2019 26	Elche	2–0	Extremadura	Elche
18:00 CET (UTC+1)	Manuel (yellow card) 19', (goal) 88'; I. Sánchez 29' (pen.); Gonzalo (yellow card) 47'; Flores (yellow card) 88'	Report	Kike (yellow card) 33'; Fausto (yellow card) 38'; Ortuño (yellow card) 69'; Olabe (yellow card) 90'	Stadium: Martínez Valero; Attendance: 9,528; Referee: José Antonio López Toca

24 February 2019 27	Lugo	2–2	Elche	Lugo
18:00 CET (UTC+1)	Martínez (yellow card) 35'; Pita (yellow card) 49'; Lazo 55', 65'	Report	González 31'; Qasmi 58'; Manuel (yellow card) 87'; Tekio (yellow card) 90+2'	Stadium: Anxo Carro; Attendance: 3,715; Referee: Isidro Díaz de Mera Escuderos

3 March 2019 28	Mallorca	1–1	Elche	Palma
12:00 CET (UTC+1)	Raíllo (yellow card) 52'; Budimir 56'; Pedraza (yellow card) 62'; Sevilla (yellow card) 68'	Report	I. Sánchez 15', (yellow card) 66'; Qasmi (yellow card) 31' (yellow-red card) 66'; Manuel (yellow card) 38'; Calvo (yellow card) 51'; Gonzalo (yellow card) 53'; Flores (yellow card) 57'; Cruz (yellow card) 61'	Stadium: Estadi de Son Moix; Attendance: 7,150; Referee: Valentín Pizarro Gómez

9 March 2019 29	Elche	1–0	Cádiz	Elche
20:30 CET (UTC+1)	Calvo (yellow card) 33'; Cruz (red card) 40'; González 66'; Badía (yellow card) 81'	Report	Correa (yellow card) 18'; Salvi (yellow card) 46'; José Mari (yellow card) 70'; Aketxe (yellow card) 88'	Stadium: Martínez Valero; Attendance: 9,986; Referee: César Soto Grado

16 March 2019 30	Zaragoza	1–0	Elche	Zaragoza
20:30 CET (UTC+1)	Linares 5'; Soro (yellow card) 7'; Aguirre (yellow card) 35'; Biel (yellow card) 37'; Delmás (yellow card) 59'	Report	Gonzalo (yellow card) 13'; González (yellow card) 33'; Manuel (yellow card) 84'	Stadium: La Romareda; Attendance: 20,943; Referee: Luis Mario Milla Alvendiz

23 March 2019 31	Elche	3–1	Alcorcón	Elche
16:00 CET (UTC+1)	Calvo (yellow card) 9'; Josan 20'; Torres (yellow card) 16', (goal) 42' (pen.); Badía (yellow card) 56'; Tekio (yellow card) 64'; I. Sánchez (yellow card) 65'; Gonzalo 71'	Report	Burgos (yellow card) 11'; Muñoz 31'; Galán (yellow card) 76'	Stadium: Martínez Valero; Attendance: 9,329; Referee: Aitor Gorostegui Fernández-Ortega

31 March 2019 32	Las Palmas	0–1	Elche	Las Palmas
20:00 CEST (UTC+2)	Cala (yellow card) 10'; Á. Lemos (yellow card) 28'; Peñalba (yellow card) 37'; De Galarreta (yellow card) 38'; Aythami (yellow card) 54'	Report	Josan (yellow card) 19'; Azamoum (yellow card) 22'; Gil (yellow card) 63'; Castro 84'	Stadium: Gran Canaria; Attendance: 10,339; Referee: Víctor Areces Franco

7 April 2019 33	Elche	1–0	Córdoba	Elche
20:00 CEST (UTC+2)	Nino 15', (yellow card) 16'; Gonzalo (yellow card) 19'	Report		Stadium: Martínez Valero; Attendance: 9,400; Referee: Javier Iglesias Villanueva

14 April 2019 34	Albacete	1–1	Elche	Albacete
12:00 CEST (UTC+2)	Torres (yellow card) 18'; Herrera (yellow card) 40'; Eugeni 57'	Report	Gonzalo (yellow card) 6'; Azamoum (yellow card) 33'; Flores (yellow card) 68'; Castro 83'; Manuel (yellow card) 90+1'	Stadium: Carlos Belmonte; Attendance: 13,150; Referee: Abraham Domínguez Cervantes

22 April 2019 35	Elche	1–2	Osasuna	Elche
21:00 CEST (UTC+2)	I. Sánchez 7'; Qasmi (yellow card) 31'; Tekio (yellow card) 72'; Flores (yellow card) 90+1'	Report	D. García 60', (yellow card) 82'; Torres 86'	Stadium: Martínez Valero; Attendance: 10,698; Referee: Daniel Jesús Trujillo Suárez

28 April 2019 36	Sporting Gijón	1–1	Elche	Gijón
16:00 CEST (UTC+2)	Babin (yellow card) 21', (goal) 28'	Report	Calvo (yellow card) 11'; Neyder (yellow card) 72'; Nino 75'; Manuel (yellow card) 77'; Flores (yellow card) 90+3'	Stadium: El Molinón; Attendance: 19,850; Referee: Jorge Figueroa Vázquez

5 May 2019 37	Elche	2–1	Rayo Majadahonda	Elche
18:00 CEST (UTC+2)	Nino 59'; Qasmi 69'; Azamoum (yellow card) 81'; Flores (yellow card) 88'	Report	Galán (yellow card) 20'; Morillas (yellow card) 57'; Fede Varela 71'; Benito (yellow card) 89'	Stadium: Martínez Valero; Attendance: 10,405; Referee: Víctor Areces Franco

12 May 2019 38	Almería	5–3	Elche	Almería
12:00 CEST (UTC+2)	Álvaro 15', 43', 45+2' (pen.); Juan Carlos 59'; Aguza (yellow card) 85', (goal) 90+1'	Report	Gil 3' (pen.), (yellow card) 37'; Nino 9', (yellow card) 45+1'; Villar (yellow card) 15'; Manuel (yellow card) 46'; Gonzalo (yellow card) 67'; I. Sánchez 69' (pen.)	Stadium: Juegos Mediterráneos; Attendance: 5,127; Referee: David Pérez Pallas

18 May 2019 39	Elche	3–0	Tenerife	Elche
20:30 CEST (UTC+2)	Azamoum (yellow card) 19'; Josan 27'; Nino (yellow card) 53'; Torres 68' (pen.), (yellow card) 86'; Gil 88'	Report	Lasso (yellow card) 38'; Suso (yellow card) 67'; Alberto (yellow card) 80'	Stadium: Martínez Valero; Attendance: 7,360; Referee: Isidro Díaz de Mera Escuderos

26 May 2019 40	Gimnàstic	3–3	Elche	Tarragona
16:00 CEST (UTC+2)	Uche 79'; Neyder 83' (o.g.); Suárez 84'; Valentín (yellow card) 87' (yellow-red card) 90+1'	Report	Torres 31'; Castro 49' (pen.); Cruz (yellow card) 53' (yellow-red card) 59'; Josan 69'; Borja (yellow card) 90'; I. Sánchez (yellow card) 90+3'	Stadium: Nou Estadi; Attendance: 1,669; Referee: Álvaro Moreno Aragón

4 June 2019 41	Elche	0–0	Deportivo La Coruña	Elche
21:00 CEST (UTC+2)	Azamoum (yellow card) 33'; Calvo (yellow card) 35'; Gonzalo (yellow card) 52'; Gil (yellow card) 84'	Report	Duarte (yellow card) 28'	Stadium: Martínez Valero; Attendance: 5,914; Referee: Rubén Ávalos Barrera

8 June 2019 42	Málaga	3–0	Elche	Málaga
20:30 CEST (UTC+2)	Boulahroud 5'; Ricca (yellow card) 55', (goal) 66'; Boussefiane 71'	Report	Nino (yellow card) 37'; Flores (yellow card) 40'; Manuel (yellow card) 60'; Tekio (yellow card) 63'; Qasmi (yellow card) 90+2'; I. Sánchez (yellow card) 90+2'	Stadium: La Rosaleda; Attendance: 17,906; Referee: Rubén Ávalos Barrera

=== Copa del Rey ===
13 September 2018 Second round	Elche	2–1	Granada	Elche
22:00 CEST (UTC+2)	Jony 41' (pen.); Tekio (yellow card) 56'; Provencio 68'	Report	Castellano (yellow card) 30' (yellow-red card) 38'; Aguirre (yellow card) 40'; Juancho (yellow card) 57'; Rodri (yellow card) 70'; Díaz (yellow card) 80'; Vázquez 81'	Stadium: Martínez Valero; Attendance: 5,409; Referee: Gorka Sagués Oscoz

16 October 2018 Third round	Elche	1–4	Córdoba	Elche
20:00 CEST (UTC+2)	Cruz (yellow card) 46'; Zotko (yellow card) 69'; Borja (yellow card) 84'; Villar 90'	Report	De las Cuevas 26'; Muñoz 30'; Galán 61'; Fernández (yellow card) 81'; Moyano (yellow card) 50', (goal) 82'	Stadium: Martínez Valero; Attendance: 5,301; Referee: Isidro Díaz de Mera Escuderos

== Statistics ==
=== Goalscorers ===
Ran	No.	Pos	Nat	Name	Segunda División	Copa del Rey	Total
1	18	FW	(Guinea)	Sory Kaba	8	0	8
2	9	FW	(Spain)	Nino	7	0	7
2	11	MF	(Spain)	Iván Sánchez	7	0	7
4	14	FW	(Spain)	Xavi Torres	6	0	6
5	19	FW	(Spain)	Carlos Castro	3	0	3
5	17	MF	(Spain)	Josan	3	0	3
7	16	MF	(Spain)	Nacho Gil	2	0	2
7	5	DF	(Spain)	Gonzalo	2	0	2
7	6	MF	(Spain)	Manuel	2	0	2
7	25	FW	(Morocco)	Yacine Qasmi	2	0	2
11	12	DF	(Spain)	Dani Calvo	1	0	1
11	21	MF	(Spain)	Javi Flores	1	0	1
11	24	DF	(Venezuela)	Alexander David González	1	0	1
11	20	MF	(Spain)	Jony	0	1	1
11	4	DF	(Colombia)	Neyder Lozano	1	0	1
11	22	MF	(Spain)	Borja Martínez	1	0	1
11	8	MF	(Spain)	Provencio	0	1	1
11	10	MF	(Spain)	Gonzalo Villar	0	1	1
				Own goals	1	0	1
Total					48	3	51

=== Clean sheets ===
Ran	No.	Nat	Name	Segunda División	Copa del Rey	Total
1	13	(Spain)	Édgar Badía	6	0	6
2	1	(Spain)	José Juan	3	0	3
2	28	(Nigeria)	Francis Uzoho	3	0	3
Total				12	0	12
