= 2021–22 Elche CF season =

Elche CF
2021–22 season
- Owner: Christian Bragarnik
- President: Joaquín Buitrago Marhuenda
- Head coach: Fran Escribá (until 21 November); Francisco (from 28 November)
- Stadium: Estadio Manuel Martínez Valero
- La Liga: 13th
- Copa del Rey: Round of 16
- Top goalscorer: League: Pere Milla (8); All: Pere Milla (8)
- Highest home attendance: 23,010 vs Real Madrid (30 October 2021)
- Lowest home attendance: 9,145 vs Athletic Bilbao (16 August 2021)
- Biggest win: Elche 3–1 Cádiz
- Biggest defeat: Villarreal 4–1 Elche; Elche 0–3 Real Betis
| Home colours | Away colours | Third colours |

The 2021–22 season was the 99th season in the existence of Elche CF and the club's second consecutive season in the top flight of Spanish football. In addition to the domestic league, Elche participated in this season's edition of the Copa del Rey.

== Players ==
=== First-team squad ===
As of 1 February 2022.

Note: Flags indicate national team as defined under FIFA eligibility rules; some limited exceptions apply. Players may hold more than one non-FIFA nationality.

| No. | Pos. | Nation | Player |
|---|---|---|---|
| 1 | GK | ESP | Kiko Casilla (on loan from Leeds United) |
| 2 | MF | ESP | Gerard Gumbau |
| 3 | DF | CHI | Enzo Roco |
| 4 | DF | ESP | Diego González |
| 5 | DF | ESP | Gonzalo Verdú (captain) |
| 6 | DF | ESP | Pedro Bigas |
| 7 | FW | ARG | Guido Carrillo |
| 8 | MF | ESP | Raúl Guti |
| 9 | FW | ARG | Lucas Boyé |
| 10 | FW | ESP | Pere Milla |
| 11 | MF | ESP | Tete Morente |
| 12 | DF | URU | Lucas Olaza (on loan from Valladolid) |

| No. | Pos. | Nation | Player |
|---|---|---|---|
| 13 | GK | ESP | Édgar Badía |
| 14 | DF | COL | Helibelton Palacios |
| 15 | MF | ARG | Javier Pastore |
| 16 | MF | ESP | Fidel |
| 17 | MF | ESP | Josan |
| 18 | FW | ARG | Ezequiel Ponce (on loan from Spartak Moscow) |
| 19 | DF | ESP | Antonio Barragán |
| 20 | MF | ARG | Pablo Piatti |
| 21 | MF | ESP | Omar Mascarell |
| 22 | DF | COL | Johan Mojica |
| 23 | MF | ARG | Iván Marcone |
| 24 | MF | ESP | Kike Pérez (on loan from Valladolid) |

=== Reserve team ===
Note: Flags indicate national team as defined under FIFA eligibility rules; some limited exceptions apply. Players may hold more than one non-FIFA nationality.

| No. | Pos. | Nation | Player |
|---|---|---|---|
| 26 | MF | ESP | John Nwankwo |
| 27 | DF | ESP | Carles Marco |
| 28 | GK | ESP | Lluis Andreu |
| 29 | FW | ESP | Diego Bri |

| No. | Pos. | Nation | Player |
|---|---|---|---|
| 30 | DF | ESP | Sergio Bono |
| 31 | DF | ESP | Lilian |
| 32 | FW | ESP | Cheikh Diamanka |
| 34 | MF | ESP | José Luis Friaza |

=== Out on loan ===
Note: Flags indicate national team as defined under FIFA eligibility rules; some limited exceptions apply. Players may hold more than one non-FIFA nationality.

| No. | Pos. | Nation | Player |
|---|---|---|---|
| — | GK | ARG | Axel Werner (at Arsenal de Sarandí until 30 June 2022) |
| — | DF | ESP | José Salinas (at Unionistas de Salamanca until 30 June 2022) |
| — | DF | ESP | Josema (at Valladolid until 30 June 2022) |

| No. | Pos. | Nation | Player |
|---|---|---|---|
| — | MF | ESP | Jony Álamo (at Cultural Leonesa until 30 June 2022) |
| — | FW | ESP | Manu Justo (at Racing Santander until 30 June 2022) |
| — | FW | MAR | Mourad El Ghezouani (at Alcoyano until 30 June 2022) |

== Transfers ==
=== In ===
| Date | Player | From | Type | Fee | Ref |
|---|---|---|---|---|---|
| 30 June 2021 | (Spain) Ramón Folch | Tenerife | Loan return | | |
| 1 July 2021 | (Argentina) Lucas Boyé | (Italy) Torino | Buyout clause | €2M | |
| 1 July 2021 | (Argentina) Iván Marcone | (Argentina) Boca Juniors | Buyout clause | €3.8M | |
| 7 July 2021 | (Spain) Pedro Bigas | Eibar | Transfer | Undisclosed | |
| 9 July 2021 | (Chile) Enzo Roco | (Turkey) Fatih Karagümrük | Transfer | Undisclosed | |
| 12 July 2021 | (Spain) Kiko Casilla | (England) Leeds United | Loan | | |
| 20 August 2021 | (Argentina) Darío Benedetto | (France) Marseille | Loan | | |
| 31 August 2021 | (Spain) Lucas Pérez | Alavés | Transfer | Free | |

=== Out ===
| Date | Player | To | Type | Fee | Ref |
|---|---|---|---|---|---|
| 9 June 2021 | (Spain) Nino | Retired | | | |
| 30 June 2021 | (Argentina) Paulo Gazzaniga | (England) Tottenham Hotspur | Loan return | | |
| 30 June 2021 | (Colombia) Johan Mojica | Girona | Loan return | | |
| 30 June 2021 | (Argentina) Emiliano Rigoni | (Russia) Zenit Saint Petersburg | Loan return | | |

== Pre-season and friendlies ==
Win Draw Loss

| 18 July 2021 Friendly | Elche | 6–1 | Atromitos | San Pedro del Pinatar, Spain |
| 10:00 CEST (UTC+2) | Carrillo 8' (pen.); Kivrakidis 48' (o.g.); Boyé 60', 84'; Tomašević 66' (o.g.); Piatti 89' | Report | Kotsopoulos 69' (pen.) | Stadium: Pinatar Arena Football Center; Attendance: 0 |

| 24 July 2021 Friendly | Elche | 0–2 | Zaragoza | San Pedro del Pinatar, Spain |
| 21:00 CEST (UTC+2) | | Report | Narváez 24'; Adrián 78' | Stadium: Pinatar Arena Football Center; Attendance: 0 |

| 28 July 2021 Friendly | Elche | 2–2 | Tenerife | San Pedro del Pinatar, Spain |
| 21:30 CEST (UTC+2) | Morente 59'; Justo 85' | Report | Barry 74'; Corredera 81' | Stadium: Pinatar Arena Football Center; Attendance: 0 |

| 31 July 2021 Friendly | Alavés | 0–1 | Elche | Murcia, Spain |
| 19:00 CEST (UTC+2) | García (yellow card) 28' | Report | Carrillo 33' | Stadium: La Manga Club Football Center |

| 3 August 2021 Friendly | Elche | 1–1 | Cartagena | San Pedro del Pinatar, Spain |
| 19:00 CEST (UTC+2) | Boyé 63' | Report | Castro 76' | Stadium: Pinatar Arena Football Center |

| 7 August 2021 Friendly | Elche | 1–2 | Levante | Elche, Spain |
| 21:00 CEST (UTC+2) | Boyé 65' | Report | Melero 53'; Morales 80' | Stadium: Estadio Manuel Martínez Valero |

== Competitions ==
=== Overall record ===
| Competition | First match | Last match | Starting round | Final position | Record | | | | | | | |
| Competition | First match | Last match | Starting round | Final position | Pld | W | D | L | GF | GA | GD | Win % |
|---|---|---|---|---|---|---|---|---|---|---|---|---|
| La Liga | 16 August 2021 | 22 May 2022 | Matchday 1 | 13th | 38 | 11 | 9 | 18 | 40 | 52 | −12 | 28.95 |
| Copa del Rey | 2 December 2021 | 20 January 2022 | First round | Round of 16 | 4 | 3 | 0 | 1 | 6 | 3 | +3 | 75.00 |
| Total | | | | | 42 | 14 | 9 | 19 | 46 | 55 | −9 | 33.33 |

Source: Soccerway

=== La Liga ===
==== League table ====
| Pos | Team | Pld | W | D | L | GF | GA | GD | Pts |
|---|---|---|---|---|---|---|---|---|---|
| 11 | Celta Vigo | 38 | 12 | 10 | 16 | 43 | 43 | 0 | 46 |
| 12 | Rayo Vallecano | 38 | 11 | 9 | 18 | 39 | 50 | −11 | 42 (Note: Head-to-head points: Rayo Vallecano 9, Elche 7, Espanyol 1.) |
| 13 | Elche | 38 | 11 | 9 | 18 | 40 | 52 | −12 | 42 |
| 14 | Espanyol | 38 | 10 | 12 | 16 | 40 | 53 | −13 | 42 |
| 15 | Getafe | 38 | 8 | 15 | 15 | 33 | 41 | −8 | 39 (Note: Head-to-head points: Getafe 8, Mallorca 5, Cádiz 2.) |

Source: LaLiga Santander
Rules for classification: 1) Points; 2) Head-to-head points; 3) Head-to-head goal difference; 4) Goal difference; 5) Goals scored; 6) Fair-play points (Note: Head-to-head record is used only after all the matches between the teams in question have been played)

==== Results summary ====
| Overall | | | | | | | | Home | | | | | | Away | | | | | |
| Pld | W | D | L | GF | GA | GD | Pts | W | D | L | GF | GA | GD | W | D | L | GF | GA | GD |
|---|---|---|---|---|---|---|---|---|---|---|---|---|---|---|---|---|---|---|---|
| 38 | 11 | 9 | 18 | 40 | 52 | −12 | 42 | 7 | 6 | 6 | 24 | 21 | +3 | 4 | 3 | 12 | 16 | 31 | −15 |

Source: La Liga

==== Results by round ====
| Round | 1 | 2 | 3 | 4 | 5 | 6 | 7 | 8 | 9 | 10 | 11 | 12 | 13 | 14 | 15 | 16 | 17 | 18 | 19 | 20 | 21 | 22 | 23 | 24 | 25 | 26 | 27 | 28 | 29 | 30 | 31 | 32 | 33 | 34 | 35 | 36 | 37 | 38 |
|---|---|---|---|---|---|---|---|---|---|---|---|---|---|---|---|---|---|---|---|---|---|---|---|---|---|---|---|---|---|---|---|---|---|---|---|---|---|---|
| Ground | H | A | H | A | H | A | A | H | A | H | A | H | A | H | A | H | A | A | H | A | H | A | H | A | H | A | H | A | H | A | H | H | A | H | A | H | A | H |
| Result | D | L | D | W | D | L | L | W | L | D | L | L | D | L | D | W | L | L | D | W | W | D | W | L | W | L | L | W | L | L | L | W | W | D | L | L | L | W |
| Position | 14 | 17 | 15 | 11 | 12 | 15 | 15 | 14 | 14 | 15 | 15 | 16 | 18 | 18 | 17 | 16 | 16 | 17 | 17 | 16 | 15 | 15 | 14 | 14 | 13 | 13 | 14 | 14 | 14 | 15 | 15 | 13 | 14 | 13 | 14 | 14 | 15 | 13 |

Source: La Liga
A = Away; H = Home; W = Win; D = Draw; L = Loss

==== Matches ====
The league fixtures were announced on 30 June 2021.

| 16 August 2021 1 | Elche | 0–0 | Athletic Bilbao | Elche |
| 22:00 CEST (UTC+2) | Verdú (yellow card) 6'; Guti (yellow card) 78' | Report | De Marcos (yellow card) 20'; D. García (yellow card) 63' | Stadium: Estadio Manuel Martínez Valero; Attendance: 9,145; Referee: Adrián Cordero Vega |

| 22 August 2021 2 | Atlético Madrid | 1–0 | Elche | Madrid |
| 19:30 CEST (UTC+2) | Correa 39'; Suárez (yellow card) 90'; Kondogbia (yellow card) 90+6' | Report | Verdú (yellow card) 65'; Benedetto (yellow card) 88' | Stadium: Wanda Metropolitano; Attendance: 24,926; Referee: Ricardo de Burgos Bengoetxea |

| 28 August 2021 3 | Elche | 1–1 | Sevilla | Elche |
| 19:30 CEST (UTC+2) | Roco 11'; Verdú (yellow card) 41'; Fidel (yellow card) 42' | Report | En-Nesyri 40' | Stadium: Estadio Manuel Martínez Valero; Attendance: 10,385; Referee: Valentín Pizarro Gómez |

| 13 September 2021 4 | Getafe | 0–1 | Elche | Getafe |
| 20:00 CEST (UTC+2) | Suárez (yellow card) 52'; Sandro (yellow card) 85' | Report | Verdú (yellow card) 19'; Mascarell (yellow card) 24'; Palacios (yellow card) 63'; Pérez 69' | Stadium: Coliseum Alfonso Pérez; Attendance: 6,856; Referee: Mario Melero López |

| 18 September 2021 5 | Elche | 1–1 | Levante | Elche |
| 18:30 CEST (UTC+2) | Roco (yellow card) 29'; Pérez 33'; Verdú (yellow card) 55' | Report | Martínez (yellow card) 53'; Morales 55'; Vezo (yellow card) 82' | Stadium: Estadio Manuel Martínez Valero; Attendance: 11,507; Referee: Miguel Ángel Ortiz Arias |

| 22 September 2021 6 | Villarreal | 4–1 | Elche | Villarreal |
| 22:00 CEST (UTC+2) | Pino 5'; Pedraza (yellow card) 27'; Trigueros 39'; Danjuma 60'; Moreno 90+4' | Report | Mojica 19'; Fidel (yellow card) 40'; González (yellow card) 73' | Stadium: Estadio de la Cerámica; Attendance: 8,234; Referee: Alejandro Muñiz Ruiz |

| 26 September 2021 7 | Real Sociedad | 1–0 | Elche | San Sebastián |
| 18:30 CEST (UTC+2) | Portu (yellow card) 78'; Oyarzabal 81' | Report | Casilla (yellow card) 57'; Mojica (yellow card) 63'; Mascarell (yellow card) 64' | Stadium: Anoeta; Attendance: 23,941; Referee: Adrián Cordero Vega |

| 3 October 2021 8 | Elche | 1–0 | Celta Vigo | Elche |
| 14:00 CEST (UTC+2) | Josan (yellow card) 35'; Benedetto 49'; Barragán (yellow card) 58'; Mascarell (yellow card) 89'; Casilla (yellow card) 90+8' | Report | Araujo (yellow card) 72'; Mallo (yellow card) 82'; Mina (yellow card) 90+9' | Stadium: Estadio Manuel Martínez Valero; Attendance: 11,299; Referee: José Luis Munuera Montero |

| 17 October 2021 9 | Rayo Vallecano | 2–1 | Elche | Madrid |
| 14:00 CEST (UTC+2) | Hernández 26'; Nteka 65'; López (yellow card) 81'; Á. García (yellow card) 90+1' | Report | Boyé 14'; Gumbau (yellow card) 28'; Casilla (yellow card) 90+4' | Stadium: Campo de Fútbol de Vallecas; Attendance: 6,989; Referee: Santiago Jaime Latre |

| 23 October 2021 10 | Elche | 2–2 | Espanyol | Elche |
| 18:30 CEST (UTC+2) | Boyé 23'; Verdú (yellow card) 34'; Benedetto 84'; Palacios (yellow card) 86'; Bigas (yellow card) 90+4' | Report | Morlanes 51'; De Tomás 52'; Di. López (yellow card) 74' | Stadium: Estadio Manuel Martínez Valero; Attendance: 13,449; Referee: Jorge Figueroa Vázquez |

| 26 October 2021 11 | Alavés | 1–0 | Elche | Vitoria-Gasteiz |
| 19:00 CEST (UTC+2) | Navarro (yellow card) 18'; Loum 47' | Report | Roco (yellow card) 42' | Stadium: Mendizorrotza; Attendance: 10,206; Referee: Jesús Gil Manzano |

| 30 October 2021 12 | Elche | 1–2 | Real Madrid | Elche |
| 14:00 CEST (UTC+2) | Guti (yellow card) 8' (yellow-red card) 63'; Milla 86' | Report | Vinícius 22', 73' | Stadium: Estadio Manuel Martínez Valero; Attendance: 23,010; Referee: Ricardo de Burgos Bengoetxea |

| 7 November 2021 13 | Mallorca | 2–2 | Elche | Palma |
| 18:30 CET (UTC+1) | Russo (yellow card) 17'; Baba (yellow card) 59'; Sevilla 72' (pen.); Maffeo 90+5' | Report | Boyé (yellow card) 33', (goal) 68', 75'; Barragán (yellow card) 38'; Bigas (yellow card) 88' | Stadium: Visit Mallorca Stadium; Attendance: 12,933; Referee: Mario Melero López |

| 21 November 2021 14 | Elche | 0–3 | Real Betis | Elche |
| 18:30 CET (UTC+1) | Boyé (yellow card) 53' | Report | Juanmi 12', (yellow card) 18'; Willian José 24' (pen.); Fekir 27'; Bellerín (red card) 68'; Moreno (yellow card) 90' | Stadium: Estadio Manuel Martínez Valero; Attendance: 16,127; Referee: Valentín Pizarro Gómez |

| 29 November 2021 15 | Osasuna | 1–1 | Elche | Pamplona |
| 21:00 CET (UTC+1) | Budimir 7' (pen.); Sánchez (yellow card) 90+1' | Report | Fidel (yellow card) 6', (goal) 19'; Marcone (yellow card) 50'; Mascarell (yellow card) 56' | Stadium: El Sadar; Attendance: 16,485; Referee: Isidro Díaz de Mera Escuderos |

| 5 December 2021 16 | Elche | 3–1 | Cádiz | Elche |
| 16:15 CET (UTC+1) | Palacios (yellow card) 2'; Fidel 13' (pen.), (yellow card) 26'; Roco (yellow card) 22'; Marcone (yellow card) 28'; González (yellow card) 70'; Morente 75', (yellow card) 83'; Gumbau (yellow card) 80'; Josan 90+3' | Report | Fernández (penalty missed) 25', 90+1'; Haroyan (yellow card) 58'; Lozano (yellow card) 70'; Akapo (yellow card) 78' | Stadium: Estadio Manuel Martínez Valero; Attendance: 11,879; Referee: Alejandro Muñiz Ruiz |

| 11 December 2021 17 | Valencia | 2–1 | Elche | Valencia |
| 18:30 CET (UTC+1) | Guedes 23'; Gómez (yellow card) 34'; Wass (yellow card) 48'; Piccini 86'; Foulquier (yellow card) 90+2' | Report | Morente (yellow card) 41'; Boyé 75'; Roco (yellow card) 90+2' | Stadium: Mestalla; Attendance: 31,662; Referee: Santiago Jaime Latre |

| 18 December 2021 18 | Barcelona | 3–2 | Elche | Barcelona |
| 18:30 CET (UTC+1) | Jutglà 16'; Gavi 19'; García (yellow card) 79'; González 85' | Report | Morente 62'; Milla 63', (yellow card) 71'; Gumbau (yellow card) 77'; Roco (yellow card) 86' | Stadium: Camp Nou; Attendance: 41,664; Referee: Javier Alberola Rojas |

| 2 January 2022 19 | Elche | 0–0 | Granada | Elche |
| 16:15 CET (UTC+1) | Fidel (yellow card) 45+4'; Pastore (yellow card) 45+5'; Morente (yellow card) 45+5'; González (red card) 47' | Report | Machís (yellow card) 45+6'; Suárez (yellow card) 45+8'; Quini (yellow card) 58' | Stadium: Estadio Manuel Martínez Valero; Attendance: 12,160; Referee: Adrián Cordero Vega |

| 10 January 2022 20 | Espanyol | 1–2 | Elche | Cornellà de Llobregat |
| 21:00 CET (UTC+1) | Bare (yellow card) 22'; Pedrosa (yellow card) 30'; De Tomás 45+3' (pen.), (yellow card) 88'; Mérida (yellow card) 90+1' | Report | Milla 6', 14', (yellow card) 83'; Palacios (yellow card) 36'; Verdú (yellow card) 45+1'; Mojica (yellow card) 49'; Gumbau (yellow card) 77'; Roco (yellow card) 90' | Stadium: RCDE Stadium; Attendance: 11,870; Referee: Jesús Gil Manzano |

| 16 January 2022 21 | Elche | 1–0 | Villarreal | Elche |
| 14:00 CET (UTC+1) | Verdú (yellow card) 10'; Boyé 78'; Mojica (yellow card) 87'; González (yellow card) 90+4'; Milla (yellow card) 90+4' | Report | Parejo (yellow card) 81'; Capoue (yellow card) 90+3'; Iborra (yellow card) 90+4' | Stadium: Estadio Manuel Martínez Valero; Attendance: 12,433; Referee: Valentín Pizarro Gómez |

| 23 January 2022 22 | Real Madrid | 2–2 | Elche | Madrid |
| 16:15 CET (UTC+1) | Benzema (penalty missed) 33'; Militão (yellow card) 54', (goal) 90+2'; Vinícius (yellow card) 72'; Modrić 82' (pen.); Alaba (yellow card) 90+5' | Report | Boyé 42'; Fidel (yellow card) 55'; Milla 76' | Stadium: Santiago Bernabéu; Attendance: 39,796; Referee: Ricardo de Burgos Bengoetxea |

| 5 February 2022 23 | Elche | 3–1 | Alavés | Elche |
| 14:00 CET (UTC+1) | Milla 46', 58'; Verdú (yellow card) 67'; Fidel 86' | Report | Joselu 18'; Pina (yellow card) 90+4' | Stadium: Estadio Manuel Martínez Valero; Attendance: 12,923; Referee: Mario Melero López |

| 11 February 2022 24 | Sevilla | 2–0 | Elche | Seville |
| 21:00 CET (UTC+1) | Gómez 70'; Mir 76'; Acuña (yellow card) 90' | Report | Verdú (yellow card) 35'; Gumbau (yellow card) 36'; Badía (yellow card) 70'; Pastore (yellow card) 80'; Roco (yellow card) 90' | Stadium: Ramón Sánchez Pizjuán; Attendance: 33,411; Referee: Miguel Ángel Ortiz Arias |

| 18 February 2022 25 | Elche | 2–1 | Rayo Vallecano | Elche |
| 21:00 CET (UTC+1) | Guti (yellow card) 32'; Carrillo 76'; Ponce 84'; Mojica (yellow card) 90+6' | Report | Comesaña (yellow card) 7'; F. García 52'; Catena (yellow card) 68'; Sylla (yellow card) 72'; Balliu (yellow card) 75' | Stadium: Estadio Manuel Martínez Valero; Attendance: 14,742; Referee: Alejandro Muñiz Ruiz |

| 25 February 2022 26 | Levante | 3–0 | Elche | Valencia |
| 21:00 CET (UTC+1) | Morales 37'; De Frutos 67', (yellow card) 69'; Melero 90' | Report | Barragán (yellow card) 59'; Gumbau (red card) 73'; Roco (yellow card) 83' | Stadium: Ciutat de València; Attendance: 14,237; Referee: Pablo González Fuertes |

| 6 March 2022 27 | Elche | 1–2 | Barcelona | Elche |
| 16:15 CET (UTC+1) | Fidel 44'; Barragán (yellow card) 56'; Ponce (yellow card) 67'; Pastore (red card) 88' | Report | Araújo (yellow card) 49'; Dembélé (yellow card) 58'; Torres 60'; Dani Alves (yellow card) 71'; Nico (yellow card) 73'; Piqué (yellow card) 82'; Depay 84' (pen.), (yellow card) 90+6' | Stadium: Estadio Manuel Martínez Valero; Attendance: 30,146; Referee: Mario Melero López |

| 12 March 2022 28 | Granada | 0–1 | Elche | Granada |
| 16:15 CET (UTC+1) | Torrente (yellow card) 38'; Quini (yellow card) 54'; Petrović (yellow card) 56' | Report | Fidel 11', (yellow card) 82'; Boyé (yellow card) 33'; Roco (yellow card) 50'; Gumbau (yellow card) 65'; Mojica (yellow card) 70'; Olaza (yellow card) 88' | Stadium: Nuevo Los Cármenes; Attendance: 15,345; Referee: Carlos del Cerro Grande |

| 19 March 2022 29 | Elche | 0–1 | Valencia | Elche |
| 16:15 CET (UTC+1) | Barragán (yellow card) 8'; Verdú (yellow card) 45+1'; Mojica (red card) 90+2'; Fidel (yellow card) 90+3' | Report | Foulquier (yellow card) 27'; Diakhaby (yellow card) 40'; Guedes 50'; Gil (yellow card) 65' | Stadium: Estadio Manuel Martínez Valero; Attendance: 15,780; Referee: Miguel Ángel Ortiz Arias |

| 3 April 2022 30 | Athletic Bilbao | 2–1 | Elche | Bilbao |
| 14:00 CEST (UTC+2) | Berenguer 32'; Vesga (yellow card) 50'; Villalibre 86'; Núñez (yellow card) 90+5' | Report | Bigas (yellow card) 48'; Marcone (yellow card) 56'; Carrillo (yellow card) 61'; Josan (yellow card) 67', (goal) 90+2' | Stadium: San Mamés; Attendance: 34,572; Referee: Jorge Figueroa Vázquez |

| 10 April 2022 31 | Elche | 1–2 | Real Sociedad | Elche |
| 18:30 CEST (UTC+2) | Carrillo 3', (yellow card) 34'; Palacios (yellow card) 21'; Gumbau (yellow card) 24' | Report | Isak (penalty missed) 19', (yellow card) 19'; Sørloth 31'; Zubimendi (yellow card) 37'; Le Normand 39'; Zaldúa (yellow card) 82' | Stadium: Estadio Manuel Martínez Valero; Attendance: 17,011; Referee: Guillermo Cuadra Fernández |

| 16 April 2022 32 | Elche | 3–0 | Mallorca | Elche |
| 14:00 CEST (UTC+2) | Mojica 42'; Bigas 58', (yellow card) 60'; Lee 81' (o.g.); Mascarell (yellow card) 86' | Report | Oliván (yellow card) 45+2'; Baba (yellow card) 53'; Sánchez (yellow card) 64' | Stadium: Estadio Manuel Martínez Valero; Attendance: 20,257; Referee: José María Sánchez Martínez |

| 19 April 2022 33 | Real Betis | 0–1 | Elche | Seville |
| 21:00 CEST (UTC+2) | Guardado (yellow card) 49'; Moreno (yellow card) 84'; Akouokou (red card) 90+3' | Report | Palacios (yellow card) 26'; Badía (yellow card) 79'; Morente 82'; Pérez (yellow card) 84' | Stadium: Benito Villamarín; Attendance: 43,257; Referee: Javier Alberola Rojas |

| 1 May 2022 34 | Elche | 1–1 | Osasuna | Elche |
| 14:00 CEST (UTC+2) | Fidel (yellow card) 36'; Roco (yellow card) 41'; Mascarell (yellow card) 43'; Milla 84'; Carrillo (yellow card) 90' | Report | Budimir (yellow card) 44', (goal) 67' (pen.); Cruz (yellow card) 64' | Stadium: Estadio Manuel Martínez Valero; Attendance: 16,305; Referee: Carlos del Cerro Grande |

| 7 May 2022 35 | Cádiz | 3–0 | Elche | Cádiz |
| 18:30 CEST (UTC+2) | Hernández (yellow card) 20'; Negredo 80'; Sobrino 83'; Lozano 90+3' | Report | Ponce (red card) 66' | Stadium: Nuevo Mirandilla; Attendance: 17,615; Referee: Alejandro Hernández Hernández |

| 11 May 2022 36 | Elche | 0–2 | Atlético Madrid | Elche |
| 21:30 CEST (UTC+2) | Milla (yellow card) 7'; Bigas (yellow card) 40' | Report | Cunha 28'; Lodi (yellow card) 35'; De Paul 62'; Koke (yellow card) 90+3' | Stadium: Estadio Manuel Martínez Valero; Attendance: 21,266; Referee: Pablo González Fuertes |

| 15 May 2022 37 | Celta Vigo | 1–0 | Elche | Vigo |
| 19:30 CEST (UTC+2) | Suárez 9'; Galán (yellow card) 56'; Tapia (yellow card) 73' | Report | Marcone (yellow card) 81'; Morente (yellow card) 90+3' | Stadium: Balaídos; Attendance: 10,773; Referee: Mario Melero López |

| 22 May 2022 38 | Elche | 3–1 | Getafe | Elche |
| 18:30 CEST (UTC+2) | Olaza 37'; Bigas (yellow card) 51'; Gumbau (yellow card) 62'; Pérez 84', 90+2' | Report | Ünal 33'; Mitrović (yellow card) 36'; Djené (yellow card) 87' | Stadium: Estadio Manuel Martínez Valero; Attendance: 21,266; Referee: Guillermo Cuadra Fernández |

=== Copa del Rey ===
| 2 December 2021 First round | Leioa | 0–2 | Elche | Leioa |
| 21:00 CET (UTC+1) | | Report | Carrillo 43', 56' | Stadium: Sarriena; Referee: Adrián Cordero Vega |

| 15 December 2021 Second round | Unionistas | 0–1 | Elche | Salamanca |
| 21:00 CET (UTC+1) | | Report | Román 90+3' (o.g.) | Stadium: Reina Sofía; Referee: Carlos del Cerro Grande |

| 6 January 2022 Round of 32 | Almería | 1–2 | Elche | Almería |
| 20:00 CET (UTC+1) | Ramazani 42'; Robles (yellow card) 56'; Sousa (yellow card) 65'; Appiah (yellow card) 66'; Costa (yellow card) 68'; Centelles (yellow card) 83' | Report | Barragán (yellow card) 49'; Piatti 52'; González (yellow card) 64'; Verdú (yellow card) 66'; Milla (yellow card) 68'; Guti 84'; Josema (yellow card) 90' | Stadium: Juegos Mediterráneos; Referee: Alejandro Hernández Hernández |

| 20 January 2022 Round of 16 | Elche | 1–2 (a.e.t.) | Real Madrid | Elche |
| 19:00 CET (UTC+1) | Milla (yellow card) 87' (yellow-red card) 120+1'; Verdú 103' | Report | Kroos (yellow card) 78'; Casemiro (yellow card) 87'; Alaba (yellow card) 94'; Marcelo (red card) 102'; Isco 108'; Hazard 115' | Stadium: Estadio Manuel Martínez Valero; Attendance: 33,732; Referee: Jorge Figueroa Vázquez |

== Statistics ==
=== Goalscorers ===
| Position | Players | LaLiga | Copa del Rey | Total |
|---|---|---|---|---|
| MF | (Spain) Pere Milla | 8 | 0 | 8 |
| FW | (Argentina) Lucas Boyé | 7 | 0 | 7 |
| FW | (Spain) Fidel | 5 | 0 | 5 |
| FW | (Argentina) Guido Carrillo | 2 | 2 | 4 |
| MF | (Spain) Tete Morente | 3 | 0 | 3 |
| FW | (Argentina) Darío Benedetto | 2 | 0 | 2 |
| MF | (Spain) Josan | 2 | 0 | 2 |
| DF | (Colombia) Johan Mojica | 2 | 0 | 2 |
| MF | (Spain) Kike Pérez | 2 | 0 | 2 |
| FW | (Spain) Lucas Pérez | 2 | 0 | 2 |
| DF | (Spain) Pedro Bigas | 1 | 0 | 1 |
| MF | (Spain) Raúl Guti | 0 | 1 | 1 |
| DF | (Uruguay) Lucas Olaza | 1 | 0 | 1 |
| MF | (Argentina) Pablo Piatti | 0 | 1 | 1 |
| FW | (Argentina) Ezequiel Ponce | 1 | 0 | 1 |
| DF | (Chile) Enzo Roco | 1 | 0 | 1 |
| DF | (Spain) Gonzalo Verdú | 0 | 1 | 1 |
