= 2022–23 Elche CF season =

Elche CF
2022–23 season
- Owner: Christian Bragarnik
- President: Joaquín Buitrago Marhuenda
- Head coach: Francisco (until 4 October); Alberto Gallego (caretaker, from 4 to 12 October); Jorge Almirón (from 12 October to 7 November); Sergio Mantecón (caretaker, from 8 to 17 November); Pablo Machín (from 17 November to 20 March); Sebastián Beccacece (from 21 March)
- Stadium: Estadio Manuel Martínez Valero
- La Liga: 20th (relegated)
- Copa del Rey: Round of 32
- Top goalscorer: League: Lucas Boyé (7); All: Lucas Boyé; Pere Milla (7 each)
- Biggest win: L'Alcora 0–3 Elche; Guadalajara 0–3 Elche
- Biggest defeat: Villarreal 4–0 Elche; Real Madrid 4–0 Elche; Elche 0–4 Barcelona
Home colours	Away colours	Third colours

The 2022–23 Elche CF season was the club's 100th season in existence and the third consecutive season in the top flight of Spanish football. In addition to the domestic league, Elche participated in this season's edition of the Copa del Rey. The season covers the period from 1 July 2022 to 30 June 2023.

== Players ==
=== First-team squad ===
As of 1 February 2023.

Note: Flags indicate national team as defined under FIFA eligibility rules; some limited exceptions apply. Players may hold more than one non-FIFA nationality.

No.	Pos.	Nation	Player
1	GK	ARG	Axel Werner
2	DF	ARG	Lautaro Blanco
3	DF	CHI	Enzo Roco
4	DF	ESP	Diego González
5	DF	ESP	Gonzalo Verdú (captain)
6	DF	ESP	Pedro Bigas
7	DF	ARG	Lisandro Magallán
8	MF	ESP	Raúl Guti
9	FW	ARG	Lucas Boyé
10	FW	ESP	Pere Milla
11	MF	ESP	Tete Morente
13	GK	ESP	Edgar Badia
14	DF	COL	Helibelton Palacios

No.	Pos.	Nation	Player
15	MF	ESP	Álex Collado (on loan from Barcelona)
16	MF	ESP	Fidel
17	MF	ESP	Josan
19	FW	ARG	Ezequiel Ponce
20	MF	ESP	Gerard Gumbau
21	MF	ESP	Omar Mascarell
22	DF	ARG	Nicolás Fernández
23	DF	ESP	Carlos Clerc
24	DF	ESP	Pol Lirola (on loan from Marseille)
26	DF	ESP	John Nwankwo
40	DF	ESP	José Ángel Carmona (on loan from Sevilla)
—	MF	FRA	Randy Nteka (on loan from Rayo Vallecano)

=== Out on loan ===
Note: Flags indicate national team as defined under FIFA eligibility rules; some limited exceptions apply. Players may hold more than one non-FIFA nationality.

No.	Pos.	Nation	Player
—	DF	ESP	José Salinas (at Mirandés until 30 June 2023)
—	FW	ESP	Roger Martí (at Cádiz until 30 June 2023)

No.	Pos.	Nation	Player
—	FW	MAR	Mourad Daoudi (at Burgos until 30 June 2023)

== Transfers ==
=== In ===
Date	Player	From	Type	Fee	Ref
1 June 2022	(Argentina) Ezequiel Ponce	(Russia) Spartak Moscow	Buyout clause	Undisclosed	
21 July 2022	(Spain) Carlos Clerc	(Spain) Levante	Transfer	Free	
4 August 2022	(Spain) Roger Martí	(Spain) Levante	Transfer	Undisclosed	
8 August 2022	(Argentina) Lautaro Blanco	(Argentina) Rosario Central	Transfer	Undisclosed	
12 August 2022	(Spain) Pol Lirola	(France) Marseille	Loan		
15 August 2022	(Spain) Álex Collado	(Spain) Barcelona	Loan		
16 August 2022	(Portugal) Domingos Quina	(England) Watford	Loan		
1 September 2022	(Argentina) Federico Fernández	(England) Newcastle United	Transfer	Undisclosed	
1 September 2022	(Argentina) Nicolás Fernández	(Argentina) San Lorenzo	Transfer	Undisclosed	

=== Out ===
Date	Player	To	Type	Fee	Ref
1 July 2022	(Argentina) Iván Marcone	(Argentina) Independiente	Transfer	€1,9M	
30 July 2022	(Spain) José Salinas	(Spain) Mirandés	Loan		
8 August 2022	(Argentina) Lautaro Blanco	(Argentina) Rosario Central	Loan		
12 August 2022	(Spain) Josema	(Spain) Leganés	Transfer	Free	
1 September 2022	(Morocco) Mourad Daoudi	(Spain) Burgos	Loan		
1 September 2022	(Colombia) Johan Mojica	(Spain) Villarreal	Transfer	Undisclosed	
11 January 2023	(Argentina) Javier Pastore	Qatar SC	Transfer	Free	

== Pre-season and friendlies ==
Win Draw Loss Fixtures

16 July 2022 Friendly	Elche	1–2	Newcastle United Under-21	Algorfa
19:00 CEST (UTC+2)				Stadium: La Finca Golf & Spa Resort

20 July 2022 Friendly	Elche	1–3	Villarreal B	San Pedro del Pinatar
19:00 CEST (UTC+2)				Stadium: Pinatar Arena

23 July 2022 Friendly	Elche	2–1	Leganés	San Pedro del Pinatar
10:00 CEST (UTC+2)				Stadium: Pinatar Arena; Referee: Jorge Díaz Escudero

27 July 2022 Friendly	Getafe	0–1	Elche	Algorfa
10:30 CEST (UTC+2)			Mourad 17'	Stadium: La Finca Golf & Spa Resort

30 July 2022 Friendly	Cartagena	2–0	Elche	Cartagena
20:00 CEST (UTC+2)	Vázquez 20'; Ortuño 35'			Stadium: Estadio Cartagonova; Attendance: 5,000; Referee: Sánchez López

2 August 2022 Friendly	Elche	0–1	Ibiza	Algorfa
10:00 CEST (UTC+2)	Gumbau (yellow card) 37'		Poveda 41'	Stadium: La Finca Golf & Spa Resort

2 December 2022 Friendly	Elche	1–0	West Bromwich Albion	Oliva
11:00 CET (UTC+1)	Ponce 61'	Report		Stadium: Oliva Nova Golf & Beach Resort Campo 1

8 December 2022 Friendly	Elche	1–2	Leeds United	Elche
20:15 CET (UTC+1)				Stadium: Estadio Manuel Martínez Valero

10 December 2022 Friendly	Elche	2–3	Genk	Elche, Spain
10:30 CET (UTC+1)	Ponce 16'; Milla 56'		Preciado 20'; Onuachu 76', 87'	Stadium: Estadio Manuel Martínez Valero; Attendance: 0

== Competitions ==
=== Overall record ===
Competition	First match	Last match	Starting round	Final position	Record							
Competition	First match	Last match	Starting round	Final position	Pld	W	D	L	GF	GA	GD	Win %
La Liga	15 August 2022	4 June 2023	Matchday 1	20th	38	5	10	23	30	67	−37	13.16
Copa del Rey	12 November 2022	3 January 2023	First round	Round of 32	3	2	0	1	6	1	+5	66.67
Total					41	7	10	24	36	68	−32	17.07

Source: Soccerway

=== La Liga ===
==== League table ====
Pos	Team	Pld	W	D	L	GF	GA	GD	Pts	Qualification or relegation
16	Valencia	38	11	9	18	42	45	−3	42 (Note: Head-to-head points: Cádiz 8, Getafe 5, Valencia 3.)	
17	Almería	38	11	8	19	49	65	−16	41	
18	Valladolid (R)	38	11	7	20	33	63	−30	40	Relegation to Segunda División
19	Espanyol (R)	38	8	13	17	52	69	−17	37	Relegation to Segunda División
20	Elche (R)	38	5	10	23	30	67	−37	25	Relegation to Segunda División

Source: LaLiga Santander
Rules for classification: 1) Points; 2) Head-to-head points; 3) Head-to-head goal difference; 4) Goal difference; 5) Goals scored; 6) Fair-play points (Note: Head-to-head record is used only after all the matches between the teams in question have been played)
(R) Relegated

==== Results summary ====
Overall								Home						Away					
Pld	W	D	L	GF	GA	GD	Pts	W	D	L	GF	GA	GD	W	D	L	GF	GA	GD
38	5	10	23	30	67	−37	25	3	6	10	18	29	−11	2	4	13	12	38	−26

Source: La Liga

==== Results by round ====
Round	1	2	3	4	5	6	7	8	9	10	11	12	13	14	15	16	17	18	19	20	21	22	23	24	25	26	27	28	29	30	31	32	33	34	35	36	37	38
Ground	A	H	H	A	H	A	A	H	A	H	A	H	A	H	A	H	A	H	A	H	A	H	H	A	H	A	H	A	A	H	A	H	A	H	A	H	A	H
Result	L	D	L	L	L	L	L	D	D	L	D	L	L	L	L	L	D	D	L	W	L	L	L	W	D	L	L	L	L	L	L	W	L	W	D	D	W	D
Position	18	17	17	18	19	20	20	20	20	20	20	20	20	20	20	20	20	20	20	20	20	20	20	20	20	20	20	20	20	20	20	20	20	20	20	20	20	20
Points	0	1	1	1	1	1	1	2	3	3	4	4	4	4	4	4	5	6	6	9	9	9	9	12	13	13	13	13	13	13	13	16	16	19	20	21	24	25

Source: La Liga
A = Away; H = Home; W = Win; D = Draw; L = Loss

==== Matches ====
The league fixtures were announced on 23 June 2022.

15 August 2022 1	Real Betis	3–0	Elche	Seville
21:30 CEST (UTC+2)	Fekir (yellow card) 4'; Ruibal (yellow card) 22'; Iglesias 28'; Juanmi 39', 60', (yellow card) 78'	Report	John (red card) 16'; Milla (yellow card) 16'; Gumbau (yellow card) 30'; Fidel (yellow card) 45+3'; Roger (yellow card) 64'; Josan (yellow card) 81'; Mojica (yellow card) 89'	Stadium: Benito Villamarín; Attendance: 50,622; Referee: Guillermo Cuadra Fernández

22 August 2022 2	Elche	1–1	Almería	Elche
20:00 CEST (UTC+2)	Collado 30'; Gumbau (yellow card) 52'	Report	Sadiq 23'; Centelles (red card) 32'; Eguaras (yellow card) 54'; Akieme (yellow card) 55'; Baptistão (yellow card) 86'; Kaiky (yellow card) 86'	Stadium: Martínez Valero; Attendance: 23,361; Referee: Isidro Díaz de Mera Escuderos

27 August 2022 3	Elche	0–1	Real Sociedad	Elche
17:30 CEST (UTC+2)	Gumbau (yellow card) 10'; Morente (yellow card) 30'; Mojica (yellow card) 79'	Report	Méndez 20'; Merino (penalty missed) 34', (yellow card) 45+2'; Zubeldia (yellow card) 49'; Karrikaburu (yellow card) 86'	Stadium: Martínez Valero; Attendance: 22,656; Referee: Javier Iglesias Villanueva

4 September 2022 4	Villarreal	4–0	Elche	Valencia
18:30 CEST (UTC+2)	Gerard 26'; Lo Celso 36'; Jackson (yellow card) 42'; Coquelin 88'; Morales 90+3'	Report	Guti (yellow card) 43'; Milla (yellow card) 59'; Roco (yellow card) 81'	Stadium: Ciutat de València; Attendance: 13,915; Referee: Miguel Ortiz Arias

11 September 2022 5	Elche	1–4	Athletic Bilbao	Elche
16:15 CEST (UTC+2)	Mascarell (yellow card) 30'; Roco (yellow card) 44'; Ponce 59'; Bigas (yellow card) 69'	Report	N. Fernández 9' (o.g.); Sancet 14' (pen.); N. Williams 22'; Berenguer 44'	Stadium: Martínez Valero; Attendance: 24,176; Referee: Mario Melero López

17 September 2022 6	Barcelona	3–0	Elche	Barcelona
16:15 CEST (UTC+2)	Kessié (yellow card) 5'; Lewandowski 34', 48'; Depay 41'; Torres (yellow card) 73'	Report	Verdú (red card) 14'; Bigas (yellow card) 29'; N. Fernández (yellow card) 70'	Stadium: Camp Nou; Attendance: 85,073; Referee: Alejandro Muñiz Ruiz

3 October 2022 7	Rayo Vallecano	2–1	Elche	Madrid
15:00 CEST (UTC+2)	Trejo (yellow card) 34'; Camello 40'; U. López 90+5'	Report	González (yellow card) 23'; Boyé 32', (yellow card) 69'; Quina (yellow card) 47'; Badía (yellow card) 65'; Lirola (yellow card) 81'; Ponce (yellow card) 83'; Morente (yellow card) 89'; Clerc (yellow card) 90+1'	Stadium: Campo de Fútbol de Vallecas; Attendance: 11,662; Referee: Jorge Figueroa Vázquez

10 October 2022 8	Elche	1–1	Mallorca	Elche
21:00 CEST (UTC+2)	Ponce 15', (yellow card) 15'; Boyé (red card) 61'; Verdú (yellow card) 70'; Mascarell (yellow card) 73'; Bigas (yellow card) 80'	Report	Muriqi (penalty missed) 12', 71' (pen.), (red card) 85'; Grenier (yellow card) 73'; Raíllo (yellow card) 78'; Rajković (yellow card) 87'; Battaglia (yellow card) 90+9'	Stadium: Martínez Valero; Attendance: 12,000; Referee: Valentín Pizarro Gómez

15 October 2022 9	Valencia	2–2	Elche	Valencia
16:15 CEST (UTC+2)	Mamardashvili (yellow card) 26'; Cömert (yellow card) 37'; Cavani 41' (pen.), 45+7'; Musah (yellow card) 73'	Report	Milla 29' (pen.), 65', (yellow card) 78'; Palacios (yellow card) 36'; Josan (yellow card) 39'; N. Fernández (yellow card) 69'; Badía (yellow card) 88'; Morente (yellow card) 90+6'	Stadium: Mestalla; Attendance: 41,805; Referee: Juan Luis Pulido Santana

19 October 2022 10	Elche	0–3	Real Madrid	Elche
21:00 CEST (UTC+2)	Gumbau (yellow card) 71'	Report	Valverde 11'; Benzema 75'; Asensio 89'; Rüdiger (yellow card) 90+2'	Stadium: Martínez Valero; Attendance: 30,236; Referee: Jesús Gil Manzano

23 October 2022 11	Espanyol	2–2	Elche	Cornellà de Llobregat
14:00 CEST (UTC+2)	Vinícius (yellow card) 4'; Puado 24'; Braithwaite 67'; Vidal (yellow card) 82'	Report	Milla 11'; Palacios (yellow card) 45'; Boyé (yellow card) 49'; Mascarell (yellow card) 78'; Verdú 82'	Stadium: RCDE Stadium; Attendance: 17,560; Referee: José Luis Munuera Montero

31 October 2022 12	Elche	0–1	Getafe	Elche
21:00 CEST (UTC+2)	Boyé (penalty missed) 87'	Report	Ünal 54'; Amavi (yellow card) 72' (yellow-red card) 78'; Duarte (yellow card) 77'	Stadium: Martínez Valero; Attendance: 19,588; Referee: César Soto Grado

5 November 2022 13	Valladolid	2–1	Elche	Valladolid
16:15 CET (UTC+1)	J. Sánchez 40', (yellow card) 45'; Mesa 46'; Joaquín (yellow card) 64'	Report	Josan 63'	Stadium: José Zorrilla; Attendance: 20,176; Referee: Ricardo de Burgos Bengoetxea

8 November 2022 14	Elche	1–2	Girona	Elche
19:00 CET (UTC+1)	Lirola 16'; Josan (yellow card) 28'; Gumbau (yellow card) 70'; González (yellow card) 88'	Report	Toni (yellow card) 22'; Martín 39'; Castellanos 66'; Stuani (yellow card) 88'	Stadium: Martínez Valero; Attendance: 17,339; Referee: Pablo González Fuertes

29 December 2022 15	Atlético Madrid	2–0	Elche	Madrid
21:30 CET (UTC+1)	Hermoso (yellow card) 50' (yellow-red card) 53'; Félix 56'; Morata 74'; Barrios (yellow card) 76'	Report	Verdú (red card) 45+1'; Rogelio (yellow card) 48'; Collado (yellow card) 80'; Quina (yellow card) 86' (yellow-red card) 90'	Stadium: Cívitas Metropolitano; Attendance: 38,119; Referee: Guillermo Cuadra Fernández

6 January 2023 16	Elche	0–1	Celta Vigo	Elche
18:30 CET (UTC+1)	González (yellow card) 53'; Boyé (yellow card) 64'; Milla (yellow card) 81'; Bigas (red card) 90+1'	Report	Aspas 5'; Paciência (yellow card) 30'	Stadium: Martínez Valero; Attendance: 20,121; Referee: Miguel Ángel Ortiz Arias

16 January 2023 17	Cádiz	1–1	Elche	Cádiz
21:00 CET (UTC+1)	Ocampo 7'; San Emeterio (yellow card) 72'; Alejo (yellow card) 90+2'; Diarra (yellow card) 90+5'	Report	González (yellow card) 43'; Palacios (yellow card) 62'; Ponce 81'	Stadium: Nuevo Mirandilla; Attendance: 17,389; Referee: Carlos del Cerro Grande

22 January 2023 18	Elche	1–1	Osasuna	Elche
16:15 CET (UTC+1)	Carmona (yellow card) 13', (goal) 67'; Blanco (yellow card) 45'	Report	Ávila 20', (yellow card) 55'	Stadium: Martínez Valero; Attendance: 17,589; Referee: Alejandro Muñiz Ruiz

28 January 2023 19	Sevilla	3–0	Elche	Seville
18:30 CET (UTC+1)	En-Nesyri 29', 45+4'; Acuña 43'; Ocampos (yellow card) 80'	Report	Bigas (red card) 41'; Fidel (yellow card) 44'; Mascarell (yellow card) 79'; Gumbau (yellow card) 79'	Stadium: Ramón Sánchez Pizjuán; Attendance: 35,616; Referee: César Soto Grado

4 February 2023 20	Elche	3–1	Villarreal	Elche
16:15 CEST (UTC+2)	Milla 3', 48' (pen.), 52' (pen.); Palacios (yellow card) 20'; Carmona (yellow card) 25'; Mascarell (yellow card) 37'; Fidel (yellow card) 85'	Report	Gerard 22'; Baena (yellow card) 59'; Cuenca (yellow card) 74'	Stadium: Martínez Valero; Attendance: 18,421; Referee: José Luis Munuera Montero

15 February 2023 21	Real Madrid	4–0	Elche	Madrid
21:00 CET (UTC+1)	Asensio 8'; Benzema 31' (pen.), 45+2' (pen.); Modrić 80'; Mariano (yellow card) 83'	Report	Roco (yellow card) 30'; Gumbau (yellow card) 53'; González (yellow card) 72'	Stadium: Santiago Bernabéu; Attendance: 44,319; Referee: Ricardo de Burgos Bengoetxea
Note: The match date was pushed back due to Real Madrid's involvement in the FIFA Club World Cup.

19 February 2023 22	Elche	0–1	Espanyol	Elche
14:00 CET (UTC+1)	Carmona (yellow card) 71' (yellow-red card) 81'	Report	Gil (yellow card) 43'; Oliván (yellow card) 44'; Darder 90+2'; Expósito (yellow card) 90+6'	Stadium: Martínez Valero; Attendance: 18,963; Referee: Carlos del Cerro Grande

24 February 2023 23	Elche	2–3	Real Betis	Elche
21:00 CET (UTC+1)	Fidel 7'; Boyé 9'; Roco (yellow card) 34' (yellow-red card) 90+4'; Gumbau (yellow card) 45'; Magallán (red card) 57'; Diop (red card) 58'; Palacios (yellow card) 90+3'	Report	Abner (yellow card) 6'; Iglesias 65' (pen.), (penalty missed) 88'; Miranda 68'; Willian José 90+5' (pen.)	Stadium: Martínez Valero; Attendance: 20,643; Referee: Javier Iglesias Villanueva
Note: Diop was sent off for dissent while a substitute.

4 March 2023 24	Mallorca	0–1	Elche	Palma
18:30 CET (UTC+1)	Raíllo (yellow card) 49'; Copete (yellow card) 65'; Muriqi (yellow card) 77'; Costa (yellow card) 90+11'	Report	Nteka (yellow card) 11'; Carmona (yellow card) 39'; Boyé (yellow card) 65', (goal) 88'	Stadium: Visit Mallorca Stadium; Attendance: 14,065; Referee: José Luis Munuera Montero

11 March 2023 25	Elche	1–1	Valladolid	Elche
16:15 CET (UTC+1)	Gumbau (yellow card) 20'; Morente (yellow card) 71', (goal) 90+6'; Milla (yellow card) 90+6'; Mascarell (yellow card) 90+11'	Report	Larin 4', (yellow card) 90+11'; Plano (yellow card) 72'; Mesa (yellow card) 90+5' (yellow-red card) 90+10'; Hongla (yellow card) 90+11' (yellow-red card) 90+12'	Stadium: Martínez Valero; Attendance: 18,972; Referee: Isidro Díaz de Mera Escuderos

19 March 2023 26	Real Sociedad	2–0	Elche	San Sebastián
16:15 CET (UTC+1)	Méndez (yellow card) 31'; Kubo 48'; Zubimendi (yellow card) 76'; Barrenetxea 90'	Report	Boyé (yellow card) 83'	Stadium: Reale Arena; Attendance: 28,496; Referee: José María Sánchez Martínez

1 April 2023 27	Elche	0–4	Barcelona	Elche
21:00 CEST (UTC+2)		Report	Lewandowski 20', 66', (yellow card) 87'; Fati 56'; Gavi (yellow card) 60'; Torres 70'; Araújo (yellow card) 74'	Stadium: Martínez Valero; Attendance: 28,142; Referee: Carlos del Cerro Grande

8 April 2023 28	Osasuna	2–1	Elche	Pamplona
14:00 CEST (UTC+2)	Ezzalzouli 71', 84'; Oroz (yellow card) 90+4'	Report	Morente 44'; Boyé (yellow card) 45+3'; Fidel (yellow card) 50'; Palacios (yellow card) 54'	Stadium: El Sadar; Attendance: 16,925; Referee: Pablo González Fuertes

16 April 2023 29	Girona	2–0	Elche	Girona
14:00 CEST (UTC+2)	Castellanos (yellow card) 17', (goal) 45'; Bueno (yellow card) 42'; Romeu (yellow card) 47', (goal) 70'	Report	Milla (yellow card) 22'; Boyé (yellow card) 57'; Gumbau (yellow card) 73'; Ponce (red card) 90+2'	Stadium: Montilivi; Attendance: 11,114; Referee: Jorge Figueroa Vázquez

23 April 2023 30	Elche	0–2	Valencia	Elche
14:00 CEST (UTC+2)	Donald (yellow card) 47'; Roco (yellow card) 62'; Clerc (yellow card) 84'	Report	Musah (yellow card) 14'; Lino 19'; Verdú 42' (o.g.)	Stadium: Martínez Valero; Attendance: 22,129; Referee: Guillermo Cuadra Fernández

26 April 2023 31	Celta Vigo	1–0	Elche	Vigo
22:00 CEST (UTC+2)	Aidoo 90'	Report		Stadium: Abanca-Balaídos; Attendance: 11,344; Referee: Isidro Díaz de Mera Escuderos

29 April 2023 32	Elche	4–0	Rayo Vallecano	Elche
16:15 CEST (UTC+2)	Clerc (yellow card) 40'; Morente 45+1'; Boyé 52'; Fidel 53'; Gumbau 72'	Report	Lejeune (red card) 27'; García (yellow card) 45+4'; Saveljich (yellow card) 71'	Stadium: Martínez Valero; Attendance: 11,259; Referee: Mario Melero López

2 May 2023 33	Almería	2–1	Elche	Almería
19:30 CEST (UTC+2)	Baptistão 35'; Embarba 52'; Ely (yellow card) 59'; De la Hoz (yellow card) 77'	Report	John (yellow card) 20'; Clerc (yellow card) 50'; Ponce 90'	Stadium: Power Horse Stadium; Attendance: 13,352; Referee: Alejandro José Hernández Hernández

14 May 2023 34	Elche	1–0	Atlético Madrid	Elche
16:15 CEST (UTC+2)	Fidel (yellow card) 30', (goal) 41'; Blanco (yellow card) 36'	Report		Stadium: Martínez Valero; Attendance: 22,174; Referee: Alejandro Muñiz Ruiz

20 May 2023 35	Getafe	1–1	Elche	Getafe
18:30 CEST (UTC+2)	Munir 8'; Ünal (yellow card) 45+2'; Suárez (yellow card) 50'; Djené (yellow card) 90+3'; Soria (yellow card) 90+3'	Report	Boyé 45+1'; Bigas (yellow card) 49'	Stadium: Coliseum Alfonso Pérez; Attendance: 13,927; Referee: Javier Iglesias Villanueva

24 May 2023 36	Elche	1–1	Sevilla	Elche
19:30 CEST (UTC+2)	Morente 25'; Milla (yellow card) 78'	Report	Lamela 10'; Gueye (red card) 18'; Fernando (yellow card) 60'; Navas (yellow card) 63'; Badé (yellow card) 73'; Gil (yellow card) 90+3'	Stadium: Martínez Valero; Attendance: 13,263; Referee: Isidro Díaz de Mera Escuderos

28 May 2023 37	Athletic Bilbao	0–1	Elche	Bilbao
19:00 CEST (UTC+2)	Vivian (yellow card) 17'	Report	Clerc (yellow card) 60'; Boyé 90+2'	Stadium: San Mamés; Attendance: 37,807; Referee: Valentín Pizarro Gómez

4 June 2023 38	Elche	1–1	Cádiz	Elche
21:00 CEST (UTC+2)	Morente (yellow card) 9'; Boyé 71'; Gumbau (yellow card) 82'; John (yellow card) 87'; Diop (yellow card) 90+1'	Report	Escalante 10'; San Emeterio (yellow card) 18'; Carcelén (yellow card) 68'; Fali (yellow card) 87'	Stadium: Martínez Valero; Attendance: 16,585; Referee: Jesús Gil Manzano

=== Copa del Rey ===
12 November 2022 First round	L'Alcora	0–3	Elche	Villarreal (Note: L'Alcora did not play the match in their main stadium El Saltador, L'Alcora, as it did not meet the broadcasting requirements.)
18:30 CET (UTC+1)	Albalat (yellow card) 37'; Van de Bovenkamp (yellow card) 58'; Navalon (yellow card) 85'	Report	Ponce 2'; Roger 13', 66'; Collado (yellow card) 85'	Stadium: Ciudad Deportiva; Attendance: 2,500; Referee: José María Sánchez Martínez

20 December 2022 Second round	Guadalajara	0–3	Elche	Guadalajara
19:00 CET (UTC+1)	Sergi (yellow card) 45+1'	Report	Milla 5', (yellow card) 44'; Roger (yellow card) 37'; Ponce 82'; Morente 90+2'; Collado (yellow card) 90+4'	Stadium: Pedro Escartín; Attendance: 3,000; Referee: José Luis Munuera Montero

3 January 2023 Round of 32	Ceuta	1–0	Elche	Ceuta
21:00 CET (UTC+1)	Rodri 44' (pen.), (yellow card) 77'; Cuevas (yellow card) 76'	Report	Ponce (yellow card) 27' (yellow-red card) 61'; Roco (yellow card) 43'; Morente (yellow card) 43'; Gumbau (yellow card) 44'; Blanco (yellow card) 58'	Stadium: Alfonso Murube; Attendance: 2,483; Referee: Jorge Figueroa Vázquez
