= Johan Mojica =

Colombian footballer (born 1992)

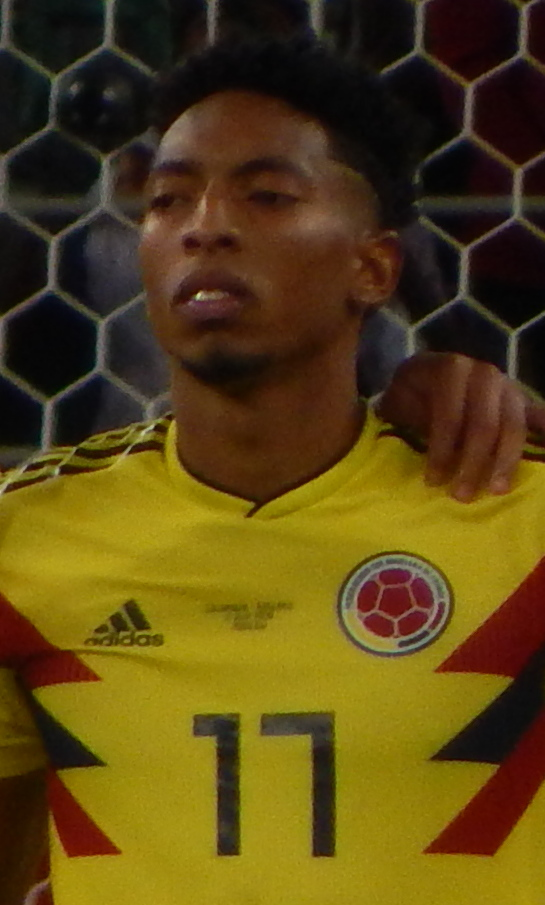
- Mojica with Colombia at the 2018 FIFA World Cup

Personal information
- Full name: Johan Andrés Mojica Palacio
- Date of birth: 21 August 1992 (age 34)
- Place of birth: Cali, Colombia
- Height: 1.85 m (6 ft 1 in)
- Position: Left-back

Team information
- Current team: Getafe
- Number: 22

Youth career
- Academia

Senior career*
| Years | Team | Apps | (Gls) |
| 2011–2012 | Academia | 33 | (0) |
| 2012–2014 | Llaneros | 17 | (0) |
| 2013 | → Deportivo Cali (loan) | 14 | (0) |
| 2013–2014 | → Rayo Vallecano (loan) | 12 | (0) |
| 2014–2018 | Rayo Vallecano | 6 | (0) |
| 2014–2016 | → Valladolid (loan) | 64 | (9) |
| 2017–2018 | → Girona (loan) | 40 | (0) |
| 2018–2021 | Girona | 34 | (0) |
| 2020–2021 | → Atalanta (loan) | 11 | (0) |
| 2021 | → Elche (loan) | 17 | (0) |
| 2021–2022 | Elche | 36 | (2) |
| 2022–2024 | Villarreal | 17 | (0) |
| 2023–2024 | → Osasuna (loan) | 30 | (0) |
| 2024–2026 | Mallorca | 71 | (1) |
| 2026– | Getafe | 0 | (0) |

International career^{‡}
| 2015– | Colombia | 49 | (1) |
Medal record
Men's football
Representing Colombia
Copa América
| Runner-up | 2024 United States |
- * Club domestic league appearances and goals as of 17 May 2026 ‡ National team caps and goals as of 7 July 2026

Johan Andrés Mojica Palacio (born 21 August 1992) is a Colombian professional footballer who plays as a left-back for La Liga club Getafe and the Colombia national team.

Mojica began his career in Colombia with second-division side Academia, before joining Llaneros in 2012. He later had loan spells at Deportivo Cali and Rayo Vallecano, before being permanently signed by Rayo in 2014. That same year, he was loaned to Valladolid, where he was included in the 2014–15 Segunda División Team of the Year. In 2017, he joined Girona (initially on loan, later permanent), helping the club earn promotion to La Liga. He subsequently spent a short loan spell at Atalanta in Serie A, before joining Elche—first on loan and later on a three-year deal. In 2022, Mojica signed with Villarreal, and in July 2024 moved to Mallorca.

Mojica made his senior debut for Colombia in March 2015. He represented the side at the FIFA World Cup in 2018 and 2026, and was also part of the squad that reached the final of the 2024 Copa América, where Colombia finished runners-up to Argentina.

== Club career ==
=== Academia ===
Born in Cali, Mojica began his professional career with Academia F.C. in Bogotá, competing in the Categoría Primera B. He made his first-team debut on 25 June 2011 in a 1–1 home draw against Expreso Rojo. During his early period with Academia, Mojica was primarily deployed as an attacking full-back and occasionally further up the pitch, and was known for his dribbling skills as well as his deep crosses.

=== Llaneros ===
In 2012, Mojica transferred to Llaneros F.C., a recently founded second-division club based in Villavicencio. He quickly became one of their standout players. His performances in the Categoría Primera B earned attention from several Categoría Primera A clubs.

=== Deportivo Cali ===
In January 2013, Mojica signed for Deportivo Cali, joining the first-team setup under manager Leonel Álvarez. He made his Categoría Primera A debut on 30 March 2013 in a 3–0 away win over Itagüí. Mojica's performances at Cali were noted, which attracted the attention of European scouts.

By mid-2013, Mojica's form in the Colombian top flight led to an opportunity to move abroad. On 5 July 2013, he joined Rayo Vallecano in Spain's La Liga on loan.

=== Rayo Vallecano ===
Mojica moved from Colombia to Spanish side Rayo Vallecano in July 2013 on a season-long loan. He made his La Liga debut on 15 September 2013, coming on as a substitute in a 5–0 away defeat to Málaga. After the campaign, Rayo signed him permanently in July 2014 but immediately loaned him to second-division side Real Valladolid for more playing time.

==== Valladolid (loan) ====
At Valladolid, Mojica was converted from left-back to a more attacking left winger. On 21 December 2014, he scored two goals in a 7–0 home win over Barcelona B in the Segunda División. Mojica finished the 2014–15 season with seven goals and several assists, earning a place in the league's Team of the Season. His loan was extended for 2015–16, during which he provided multiple assists and scored twice. In total, Mojica recorded nine goals across two seasons at Valladolid.

=== Girona ===
In January 2017, Mojica joined Girona FC on loan from Rayo. He helped the Catalan club secure promotion to La Liga for the first time at the end of the 2016–17 season. His loan was renewed for the 2017–18 campaign, where Mojica became a regular in Girona's debut top-flight season. He made 30 La Liga appearances that year and contributed several assists as Girona achieved a mid-table finish. In June 2018, Girona purchased Mojica outright on a four-year contract following his successful loan spell. However, his progress was stalled by a serious knee injury suffered in August 2018, which sidelined him for most of the 2018–19 season. He managed only one appearance that year as Girona were eventually relegated from La Liga.

==== Atalanta (loan) ====
On 22 September 2020, after Girona remained in Segunda División, Mojica moved to Atalanta in Italy on a season-long loan with an option to buy. He made his debut in Serie A shortly after joining. Mojica went on to appear 13 times in total for Atalanta (including 11 league matches and two in the UEFA Champions League), but he did not register any goals. In January 2021, Atalanta terminated the loan early due to limited playing opportunities, and Mojica returned to Spain.

=== Elche ===
On 15 January 2021, Mojica signed with Elche CF on loan for the remainder of the 2020–21 season. In August 2021, Elche secured Mojica on a permanent three-year deal. He scored his first top-flight goal on 22 September 2021, volleying home an equalizer in a 4–1 away match against Villarreal. Later in the campaign, on 16 April 2022, Mojica opened the scoring with a left-footed strike in a 3–0 victory over Mallorca, celebrating with a special dedication as he and his wife were expecting a child. In total, he scored two goals and provided five assists during 2021–22, playing a key role as Elche comfortably avoided the drop.

=== Villarreal ===
On 1 September 2022, Mojica transferred to Villarreal CF on a four-year contract, with the club reportedly paying a €5.5 million fee for his services. On 8 September 2022, he started at left-back in a UEFA Europa Conference League group stage match, Mojica played the full 90 minutes and provided an assist for Samuel Chukwueze’s goal in a 4–3 win over Lech Poznań. He made 17 league appearances (no goals) for Villarreal in the 2022–23 season.

In July 2023, Villarreal loaned Mojica out to CA Osasuna for the 2023–24 campaign.

=== Mallorca ===
On 23 July 2024, Mojica signed a three-year contract with RCD Mallorca, returning to La Liga on a permanent move. He quickly established himself as Mallorca's first-choice left-back. On 23 November 2024, Mojica set up a goal to assist teammate Robert Navarro, and in the 91st minute he scored a dramatic game-winning goal with a powerful strike from an indirect free-kick inside the box.

=== Getafe ===
On 13 August 2026, after Mallorca's relegation, Mojica agreed to a one-year deal with Getafe also in the top tier.

== International career ==
On 22 March 2015, Mojica was called up by Colombia national team for the friendlies against Bahrain and Kuwait. He made his international debut four days later, coming on as a second-half substitute for Juan Fernando Quintero and scoring the fifth in a 6–0 win.

He was included in Colombia's squad for the 2018 FIFA World Cup. He started in all of Colombia's matches, including the round of 16 match against England, where Colombia lost 3–4 on penalties following a 1–1 draw.

On 14 June 2024, Mojica was included into the squad for the 2024 Copa América. He was a starter in six of seven Colombia's matches, just replaced with Deiver Machado into third group phase match against Brazil, but entering at second half and maintaining his starter status till the final.

On 25 May 2026, he was named in head coach Néstor Lorenzo's final 26-man squad for the 2026 FIFA World Cup. He made his FIFA World Cup debut as a starter on 17 June in a 3–1 victory over Uzbekistan.

== Career statistics ==
=== Club ===
As of match played 17 May 2026

Appearances and goals by club, season and competition
| Club | Season | League | | | National cup | | Continental | | Other | | Total | |
| Club | Season | Division | Apps | Goals | Apps | Goals | Apps | Goals | Apps | Goals | Apps | Goals |
|---|---|---|---|---|---|---|---|---|---|---|---|---|
| Academia | 2011 | Primera B | 19 | 0 | 4 | 0 | — | | — | | 23 | 0 |
| Academia | 2012 | Primera B | 14 | 0 | 10 | 0 | — | | — | | 24 | 0 |
| Academia | Total | | 33 | 0 | 14 | 0 | 0 | 0 | 0 | 0 | 47 | 0 |
| Llaneros | 2012 | Primera B | 17 | 0 | 0 | 0 | — | | — | | 17 | 0 |
| Deportivo Cali (loan) | 2013 | Primera A | 14 | 0 | 6 | 0 | — | | — | | 20 | 0 |
| Rayo Vallecano (loan) | 2013–14 | La Liga | 12 | 0 | 3 | 0 | — | | — | | 15 | 0 |
| Rayo Vallecano | 2016–17 | Segunda División | 6 | 0 | 1 | 0 | — | | — | | 7 | 0 |
| Rayo Vallecano | Rayo Vallecano total | | 18 | 0 | 4 | 0 | 0 | 0 | 0 | 0 | 22 | 0 |
| Valladolid (loan) | 2014–15 | Segunda División | 33 | 7 | 4 | 0 | — | | 2 (Note: Appearances in La Liga play-offs) | 0 | 39 | 7 |
| Valladolid (loan) | 2015–16 | Segunda División | 31 | 2 | 0 | 0 | — | | — | | 31 | 2 |
| Valladolid (loan) | Total | | 64 | 9 | 4 | 0 | 0 | 0 | 2 | 0 | 70 | 9 |
| Girona (loan) | 2016–17 | Segunda División | 10 | 0 | 0 | 0 | — | | — | | 10 | 0 |
| Girona (loan) | 2017–18 | La Liga | 30 | 0 | 2 | 1 | — | | — | | 32 | 1 |
| Girona | 2018–19 | La Liga | 1 | 0 | 0 | 0 | — | | — | | 1 | 0 |
| Girona | 2019–20 | Segunda División | 33 | 0 | 0 | 0 | — | | 3 | 0 | 36 | 0 |
| Girona | Girona total | | 74 | 0 | 2 | 1 | 0 | 0 | 3 | 0 | 79 | 1 |
| Atalanta (loan) | 2020–21 | Serie A | 11 | 0 | 0 | 0 | 2 (Note: Appearances in UEFA Champions League) | 0 | — | | 13 | 0 |
| Elche (loan) | 2020–21 | La Liga | 17 | 0 | 0 | 0 | — | | — | | 17 | 0 |
| Elche | 2021–22 | La Liga | 33 | 2 | 1 | 0 | — | | — | | 34 | 2 |
| Elche | 2022–23 | La Liga | 3 | 0 | 0 | 0 | — | | — | | 3 | 0 |
| Elche | Elche total | | 53 | 2 | 1 | 0 | 0 | 0 | 0 | 0 | 54 | 2 |
| Villarreal | 2022–23 | La Liga | 17 | 0 | 3 | 0 | 7 (Note: Appearances in UEFA Europa Conference League) | 0 | — | | 27 | 0 |
| Osasuna (loan) | 2023–24 | La Liga | 30 | 0 | 1 | 0 | 2 | 1 | 1 (Note: Appearance in Supercopa de España) | 0 | 34 | 1 |
| Mallorca | 2024–25 | La Liga | 36 | 1 | 0 | 0 | — | | 1 | 0 | 37 | 1 |
| Mallorca | 2025–26 | La Liga | 35 | 0 | 0 | 0 | — | | — | | 35 | 0 |
| Mallorca | Total | | 71 | 1 | 0 | 0 | 0 | 0 | 1 | 0 | 72 | 1 |
| Career total | | | 402 | 12 | 35 | 1 | 11 | 1 | 7 | 0 | 455 | 14 |

=== International ===
As of match played 7 July 2026

Appearances and goals by national team and year
| National team | Year | Apps | Goals |
|---|---|---|---|
| Colombia | 2015 | 2 | 1 |
| Colombia | 2016 | 0 | 0 |
| Colombia | 2017 | 0 | 0 |
| Colombia | 2018 | 6 | 0 |
| Colombia | 2019 | 1 | 0 |
| Colombia | 2020 | 4 | 0 |
| Colombia | 2021 | 4 | 0 |
| Colombia | 2022 | 4 | 0 |
| Colombia | 2023 | 1 | 0 |
| Colombia | 2024 | 14 | 0 |
| Colombia | 2025 | 5 | 0 |
| Colombia | 2026 | 8 | 0 |
| Total | | 49 | 1 |

Scores and results list Colombia's goal tally first, score column indicates score after each Mojica goal.

List of international goals scored by Johan Mojica
| No. | Date | Venue | Opponent | Score | Result | Competition |
|---|---|---|---|---|---|---|
| 1 | 26 March 2015 | Bahrain National Stadium, Riffa, Bahrain | Bahrain | 5–0 | 6–0 | Friendly |

== Honours ==
Colombia

- Copa América runner-up: 2024

Individual

- Segunda División Team of the Year: 2014–15
