= Raúl Guti =

Spanish footballer (born 1996)

Personal information
- Full name: José Raúl Gutiérrez Parejo
- Date of birth: 30 December 1996 (age 29)
- Place of birth: Zaragoza, Spain
- Height: 1.77 m (5 ft 10 in)
- Position: Attacking midfielder

Youth career
- 2011–2013: Stadium Casablanca
- 2013–2015: Zaragoza

Senior career*
Years	Team	Apps	(Gls)
2015–2017	Zaragoza B	38	(7)
2017–2020	Zaragoza	84	(8)
2020–2025	Elche	116	(3)
2024	→ Zaragoza (loan)	1	(0)
2025–2026	Zaragoza	37	(2)
- * Club domestic league appearances and goals as of 31 May 2026

José Raúl Gutiérrez Parejo (born 30 December 1996), known as Raúl Guti, is a Spanish professional footballer who plays as an attacking midfielder.

== Club career ==
Born in Zaragoza, Guti joined Real Zaragoza's youth setup in 2013, from Stadium Casablanca. He made his senior debut with the reserves on 30 August 2015, coming on as a second-half substitute for Sergio Gil in a 0–0 Tercera División home draw against SD Tarazona.

Guti scored his first senior goal on 10 January 2016, in a 5–0 home routing of UD Fraga. On 26 February of the following year, he scored a brace in a 6–0 thrashing of CD Sariñena.

Guti made his professional debut on 10 June 2017, replacing fellow youth graduate Jorge Pombo and scoring his team's only goal in a 2–1 home loss against CD Tenerife in the Segunda División. A regular starter during the 2017–18 season, he scored his first professional goal on 6 January 2018 by netting the equalizer in a 1–1 home draw against FC Barcelona B.

On 20 September 2020, Guti signed a five-year contract with Elche CF, newly promoted to La Liga. He made his debut in the category six days later in a 3–0 home loss to Real Sociedad, and scored his first goal the following 11 January, in a 3–1 home defeat to Getafe CF.

On 1 February 2024, after losing his starting spot, Guti returned to his first club Zaragoza on loan for the remainder of the season. Just days later, he suffered a knee injury which sidelined him for eight months; he only returned to action in October, now back at Elche.

On 3 February 2025, Guti returned to the Maños on a permanent one-and-a-half-year contract.

== Career statistics ==
As of match played 28 January 2023

Appearances and goals by club, season and competition
Club	Season	League			National Cup		Other		Total	
Club	Season	Division	Apps	Goals	Apps	Goals	Apps	Goals	Apps	Goals
Zaragoza B	2015–16	Tercera División	32	3	—		4 (Note: Appearance(s) in Promotion Playoffs)	0	36	3
Zaragoza B	2016–17	Tercera División	4	4	—		2	0	6	4
Zaragoza B	2017–18	Segunda División B	2	0	—		—		2	0
Zaragoza B	Total		38	7	0	0	6	0	44	7
Zaragoza	2016–17	Segunda División	1	1	0	0	—		1	1
Zaragoza	2017–18	Segunda División	29	1	3	0	—		32	1
Zaragoza	2018–19	Segunda División	17	1	0	0	—		17	1
Zaragoza	2019–20	Segunda División	37	5	2	0	2	0	41	5
Zaragoza	Total		84	8	5	0	2	0	91	8
Elche	2020–21	La Liga	36	3	0	0	—		36	3
Elche	2021–22	La Liga	31	0	4	1	—		35	1
Elche	2022–23	La Liga	15	0	3	0	—		18	0
Elche	Total		82	3	7	1	—		89	4
Career total			204	18	12	1	8	0	224	19
