= Diego González (footballer, born January 1995) =

Spanish footballer (born 1995)

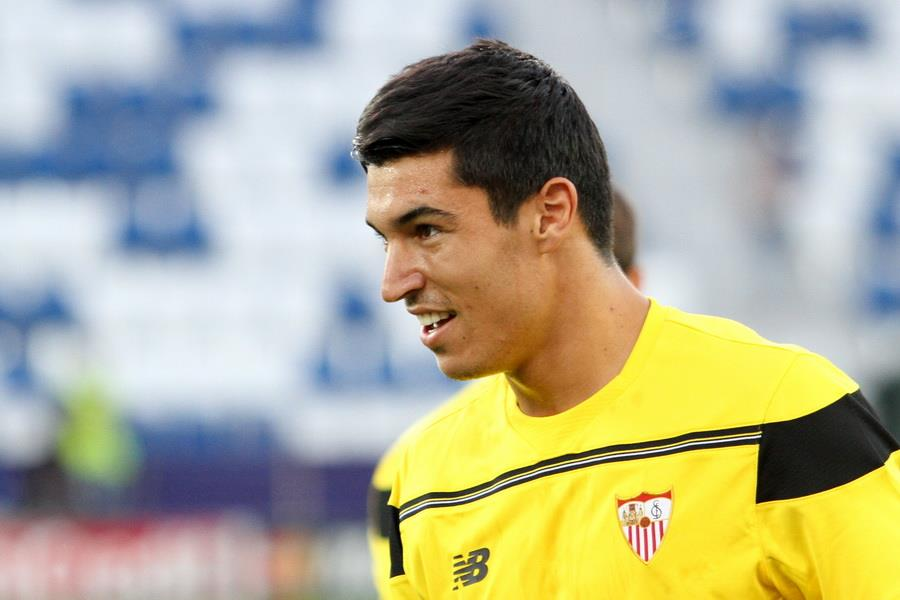
- González warming up for Sevilla in 2015

Personal information
- Full name: Diego González Polanco
- Date of birth: 28 January 1995 (age 31)
- Place of birth: Chiclana, Spain
- Height: 1.85 m (6 ft 1 in)
- Position: Centre-back

Youth career
- Sancti Petri
- 2012–2014: Cádiz

Senior career*
Years	Team	Apps	(Gls)
2012–2015	Cádiz B	49	(5)
2012–2015	Cádiz	2	(0)
2015	→ Granada B (loan)	7	(0)
2015–2017	Sevilla B	66	(2)
2015–2017	Sevilla	5	(1)
2017–2020	Málaga	72	(1)
2020–2024	Elche	73	(1)
2024	Albacete	5	(0)

International career
2016–2017	Spain U21	4	(1)
- * Club domestic league appearances and goals as of 21 November 2024

Diego González Polanco (born 28 January 1995) is a Spanish professional footballer who plays as a centre-back.

== Club career ==
Born in Chiclana de la Frontera, Province of Cádiz, Andalusia, González joined Cádiz CF's youth setup in 2012, from EF Sancti Petri. After starting out as a senior with the former's reserves in the Tercera División, he made his first-team debut on 11 November 2012, coming on as a late substitute in a 1–0 Segunda División B away loss against Albacete Balompié.

González had unsuccessful trials at Liverpool and AS Roma in 2013, being also strongly linked to Real Madrid. On 20 December 2014, he signed a new four-year deal at the Estadio Ramón de Carranza running until 2018.

On 20 January 2015, González joined another reserve team, Club Recreativo Granada on loan until June. On 22 July, he signed a two-year contract with Sevilla Atlético for a fee of €200,000.

González first appeared with Sevilla's main squad on 2 December 2015, starting in a 3–0 away win over UD Logroñés in the round of 32 of the Copa del Rey. The following 8 May, as manager Unai Emery made changes ahead of two cup finals, he made his La Liga debut as a substitute and scored a back-heeled equaliser with his first touch in a 4–1 defeat to neighbours Granada CF, at the Ramón Sánchez-Pizjuán Stadium.

On 3 August 2017, after featuring regularly with the B side in the Segunda División, González signed a four-year deal with top-flight club Málaga CF. In October 2020, he was one of the eight first-team players released due to a layoff.

On 9 October 2020, the free agent González agreed to a two-year contract at Elche CF, newly promoted to the top tier. On 7 July 2024, he signed a one-year deal with second-division Albacete, but left five months later.

== Career statistics ==
As of match played 13 October 2024

Appearances and goals by club, season and competition
Club	Season	League			National Cup		Other		Total	
Club	Season	Division	Apps	Goals	Apps	Goals	Apps	Goals	Apps	Goals
Cádiz	2012–13	Segunda División B	1	0	0	0	—		1	0
Cádiz	2013–14	Segunda División B	1	0	0	0	—		1	0
Cádiz	2014–15	Segunda División B	0	0	1	0	—		1	0
Cádiz	Total		2	0	1	0	0	0	3	0
Granada B (loan)	2014–15	Segunda División B	7	0	—		—		7	0
Sevilla B	2015–16	Segunda División B	32	1	—		6 (Note: Appearances in Segunda División B play-offs)	1	38	2
Sevilla B	2016–17	Segunda División	34	1	—		—		34	1
Sevilla B	Total		66	2	0	0	6	1	72	3
Sevilla	2015–16	La Liga	2	1	2	0	—		4	1
Sevilla	2016–17	La Liga	3	0	2	0	1 (Note: Appearance in Supercopa de España)	0	6	0
Sevilla	Total		5	1	4	0	1	0	10	1
Málaga	2017–18	La Liga	18	1	0	0	—		18	1
Málaga	2018–19	Segunda División	22	0	1	0	1 (Note: Appearance in La Liga play-offs)	0	24	0
Málaga	2019–20	Segunda División	32	0	1	0	—		33	0
Málaga	2020–21	Segunda División	0	0	0	0	—		0	0
Málaga	Total		72	1	2	0	1	0	75	1
Elche	2020–21	La Liga	19	1	0	0	—		19	1
Elche	2021–22	La Liga	28	0	3	0	—		31	0
Elche	2022–23	La Liga	16	0	2	0	—		18	0
Elche	2023–24	Segunda División	10	0	2	0	—		12	0
Elche	Total		73	1	7	0	—		80	1
Albacete	2024–25	Segunda División	5	0	0	0	—		5	0
Career total			230	5	14	0	8	1	252	6

== Honours ==
Spain U21

- UEFA European Under-21 Championship runner-up: 2017
