= Gonzalo Villar (footballer) =

Spanish footballer (born 1998)

Personal information
- Full name: Gonzalo Villar del Fraile
- Date of birth: 23 March 1998 (age 28)
- Place of birth: Murcia, Spain
- Height: 1.81 m (5 ft 11 in)
- Position: Central midfielder

Team information
- Current team: Elche
- Number: 12

Youth career
- 2009–2015: Elche
- 2015–2017: Valencia

Senior career*
Years	Team	Apps	(Gls)
2015	Elche B	3	(0)
2016–2018	Valencia B	32	(2)
2018–2020	Elche	35	(1)
2020–2023	Roma	42	(0)
2022	→ Getafe (loan)	10	(0)
2022–2023	→ Sampdoria (loan)	15	(0)
2023	→ Getafe (loan)	16	(0)
2023–2025	Granada	72	(3)
2025–2026	Dinamo Zagreb	11	(1)
2026	→ Elche (loan)	12	(1)
2026–	Elche	0	(0)

International career^{‡}
2016	Spain U19	2	(0)
2019–2021	Spain U21	10	(1)
2021	Spain	1	(0)
- * Club domestic league appearances and goals as of 27 May 2026 ‡ National team caps and goals as of 9 June 2021

Gonzalo Villar del Fraile (Spanish pronunciation: [ɡonˈθalo βiˈʎaɾ]; born 23 March 1998) is a Spanish professional footballer who plays as a central midfielder for La Liga club Elche CF.

== Club career ==
=== Early career ===
Villar was born in Murcia, and represented Elche CF as a youth. On 4 January 2015, aged just 16, he made his senior debut with the reserves by coming on as a second-half substitute in a 0–3 Segunda División B home loss against UE Sant Andreu.

On 28 August 2015 Villar joined Valencia CF for a fee of € 175,000, and returned to youth football. Promoted to the B-team ahead of the 2017–18 season, he was a first-choice in Lubo Penev's side, scoring his first senior goal on 26 August 2017 in a 4–1 home routing of CF Peralada-Girona B.

=== Elche ===
On 9 July 2018, Villar returned to Elche, being assigned to the main squad in Segunda División; Valencia retained 80% of his future transfer. He made his professional debut on 18 August, starting in a 0–0 home draw against Granada CF.

Villar scored his first professional goal on 24 November 2019, netting his team's third in a 3–3 away draw against Málaga CF.

=== Roma ===
On 29 January 2020, Villar moved abroad for the first time in his career, signing a four-and-a-half-year contract with AS Roma. Roma paid an initial fee of €4 million for his transfer, with potential extra €1 million due based on performance. He made his Serie A debut on 15 February, replacing Diego Perotti in a 1–2 away loss at Atalanta BC.

==== Loan to Getafe ====
On 13 January 2022, Villar returned to his home country after agreeing to a loan deal with La Liga side Getafe CF until the end of the season.

==== Loan to Sampdoria ====
On 8 August 2022, Villar joined Sampdoria on a season-long loan with an option to buy.

==== Second loan to Getafe ====
On 13 January 2023, Villar returned to Getafe on a season-long loan with the option to make the deal permanent, which becomes an obligation if certain conditions are met.

=== Granada ===
On 4 August 2023, Villar signed a contract with Granada CF, newly-promoted to the top tier.

=== Dinamo Zagreb ===
On 17 June 2025, Villar joined Croatian side GNK Dinamo Zagreb on a "multi-year" contract.

=== Elche return ===
On 31 January 2026, Villar returned to his first club Elche on a six-month loan deal, with a buyout clause. On 29 May, he signed a permanent three-year deal with the club.

== International career ==
Due to the isolation of some national team players following the positive COVID-19 test of Sergio Busquets, Spain's under-21 squad were called up for the international friendly against Lithuania on 8 June 2021. Villar made his senior debut in the match as Spain won 4–0.

== Personal life ==
Villar's younger brother Javier is also a footballer and a midfielder. He too was groomed at Elche.

== Career statistics ==
=== Club ===
As of match played 12 May 2026

Appearances and goals by club, season and competition
Club	Season	League			Cup		Continental		Total	
Club	Season	Division	Apps	Goals	Apps	Goals	Apps	Goals	Apps	Goals
Elche B	2014–15	Segunda División B	3	0	—		—		3	0
Valencia B	2015–16	Segunda División B	0	0	—		—		0	0
Valencia B	2016–17	Segunda División B	1	0	—		—		1	0
Valencia B	2017–18	Segunda División B	31	2	—		—		31	2
Valencia B	Total		32	2	—		—		32	2
Elche	2018–19	Segunda División	15	0	2	1	—		17	1
Elche	2019–20	Segunda División	20	1	2	0	—		22	1
Elche	Total		35	1	4	1	—		39	2
Roma	2019–20	Serie A	9	0	0	0	2	0	11	0
Roma	2020–21	Serie A	33	0	1	0	13	0	47	0
Roma	2021–22	Serie A	0	0	0	0	6	0	6	0
Roma	Total		42	0	1	0	21	0	64	0
Getafe (loan)	2021–22	La Liga	10	0	—		—		10	0
Sampdoria (loan)	2022–23	Serie A	15	0	1	0	—		16	0
Getafe (loan)	2022–23	La Liga	16	0	—		—		16	0
Granada	2023–24	La Liga	35	1	1	0	–		36	1
Granada	2024–25	Segunda División	37	2	3	0	–		40	2
Granada	Total		72	3	4	0	–		76	3
Dinamo Zagreb	2025–26	Croatian Football League	11	1	1	0	3	0	15	1
Elche (loan)	2025–26	La Liga	10	1	—		—		10	1
Career total			246	8	11	1	24	0	281	9

=== International ===
As of match played 8 June 2021

Appearances and goals by national team and year
National team	Year	Apps	Goals
Spain	2021	1	0
Total		1	0
