= Edgar Badia =

Spanish footballer

Personal information
- Full name: Edgar Badia Guardiola
- Date of birth: 12 February 1992 (age 34)
- Place of birth: Barcelona, Spain
- Height: 1.80 m (5 ft 11 in)
- Position: Goalkeeper

Youth career
- 2000–2006: Cornellà
- 2006–2011: Espanyol

Senior career*
Years	Team	Apps	(Gls)
2011–2013	Espanyol B	37	(0)
2012	Espanyol	0	(0)
2013–2014	Granada B	3	(0)
2014–2018	Reus	184	(0)
2019–2024	Elche	155	(0)
2024	→ Zaragoza (loan)	18	(0)
2024–2025	Tenerife	22	(0)
2025–2026	Cultural Leonesa	41	(0)

International career
2009	Spain U17	13	(0)
2010	Spain U18	2	(0)
2010–2011	Spain U19	12	(0)
2016–2022	Catalonia	3	(0)
- * Club domestic league appearances and goals as of 31 May 2026

Edgar Badia Guardiola (born 12 February 1992) is a Spanish professional footballer who plays as a goalkeeper.

== Club career ==
=== Espanyol ===
Born in Barcelona, Catalonia, Badia was a youth product of local RCD Espanyol. He spent his first seasons as a senior competing in Segunda División B and Tercera División with the B team.

On 11 January 2012, Badia made his official debut for the main squad, playing the full 90 minutes in a 4–2 home win against Córdoba CF in the round of 16 of the Copa del Rey (5–4 on aggregate). He continued to be almost exclusively associated with the B's during his spell.

=== Reus ===
Badia signed with Granada CF in July 2013, being assigned to the reserves in the third division. On 20 January of the following year, after acting as a backup to Stole Dimitrievski, he terminated his contract with the Andalusians and moved to CF Reus Deportiu of the same league.

Badia was an undisputed starter for the club in the following campaigns, achieving promotion to Segunda División in 2016. On 28 December 2018, he was one of five players to leave due to unpaid wages.

=== Elche ===
On 5 January 2019, Badia signed a six-month deal with Elche CF also of the second tier. He made 42 appearances – playoffs included – in the 2019–20 campaign, in a return to La Liga after a five-year absence.

Badia made his debut in the Spanish top flight on 26 September 2020, in a 0–3 home loss to Real Sociedad. He remained first-choice the following years, and in August 2022 renewed his link until 2025.

On 7 January 2024, after losing his status to new signing Miguel San Román, Badia was loaned to fellow second-division side Real Zaragoza for the remainder of the season. On 30 August, he terminated his contract with Elche.

=== Later career ===
On 11 December 2024, Badia joined CD Tenerife on a six-month deal. The following 2 July, after suffering relegation, he moved to Cultural y Deportiva Leonesa also in the second tier.

== Career statistics ==
As of match played 18 August 2024

Appearances and goals by club, season and competition
Club	Season	League			National Cup		Other		Total	
Club	Season	Division	Apps	Goals	Apps	Goals	Apps	Goals	Apps	Goals
Espanyol B	2010–11	Tercera División	1	0	—		—		1	0
Espanyol B	2011–12	Tercera División	20	0	—		—		20	0
Espanyol B	2012–13	Segunda División B	16	0	—		—		16	0
Espanyol B	Total		37	0	—		—		37	0
Espanyol	2011–12	La Liga	0	0	1	0	—		1	0
Granada B	2013–14	Segunda División B	3	0	—		—		3	0
Reus	2013–14	Segunda División B	8	0	0	0	—		8	0
Reus	2014–15	Segunda División B	38	0	0	0	2 (Note: Appearances in promotion playoffs)	0	40	0
Reus	2015–16	Segunda División B	37	0	5	0	4	0	46	0
Reus	2016–17	Segunda División	42	0	0	0	—		42	0
Reus	2017–18	Segunda División	40	0	0	0	—		40	0
Reus	2018–19	Segunda División	19	0	0	0	—		19	0
Reus	Total		184	0	5	0	6	0	195	0
Elche	2018–19	Segunda División	19	0	0	0	—		19	0
Elche	2019–20	Segunda División	38	0	0	0	4	0	42	0
Elche	2020–21	La Liga	30	0	0	0	—		30	0
Elche	2021–22	La Liga	24	0	0	0	—		24	0
Elche	2022–23	La Liga	36	0	2	0	—		38	0
Elche	2023–24	Segunda División	7	0	2	0	—		9	0
Elche	2024–25	Segunda División	1	0	—		—		1	0
Elche	Total		155	0	4	0	4	0	163	0
Zaragoza (loan)	2023–24	Segunda División	18	0	—		—		18	0
Career total			397	0	10	0	10	0	417	0

== Honours ==
Spain U19

- UEFA European Under-19 Championship: 2011

Spain U17

- FIFA U-17 World Cup third place: 2009
