= UD San Sebastián de los Reyes B =

Association football club in Spain

SS Reyes B
- Full name: Unión Deportiva San Sebastián de los Reyes "B"
- Nickname: Sanse B
- Ground: Rafael Delgado Rosa, San Sebastián de los Reyes, Madrid, Spain
- Capacity: 2,000
- President: Miguel Espinosa
- Head coach: Miguel Ángel Martínez "Lobo"
- League: Tercera Federación – Group 7
- 2025–26: Tercera Federación – Group 7, 8th of 18
Home colours	Away colours	Third colours

Unión Deportiva San Sebastián de los Reyes B is a Spanish football team based in San Sebastián de los Reyes, in the Community of Madrid. The reserve team of UD San Sebastián de los Reyes, they play in Tercera Federación – Group 7, holding home matches at Polideportivo Municipal Rafael Delgado Rosa.

== Season to season ==
Season	Tier	Division	Place
2002–03	7	2ª Reg.	6th
2003–04	7	2ª Reg.	5th
2004–05	7	2ª Reg.	1st
2005–06	6	1ª Reg.	11th
2006–07	6	1ª Reg.	6th
2007–08	6	1ª Reg.	14th
2008–09	6	1ª Reg.	5th
2009–10	6	1ª Afic.	2nd
2010–11	5	Pref.	16th
2011–12	6	1ª Afic.	2nd
2012–13	5	Pref.	5th
2013–14	5	Pref.	11th
2014–15	5	Pref.	14th
2015–16	5	Pref.	12th
2016–17	5	Pref.	4th
2017–18	5	Pref.	16th
2018–19	6	1ª Afic.	3rd
2019–20	6	1ª Afic.	1st
2020–21	5	Pref.	8th
2021–22	6	Pref.	3rd

Season	Tier	Division	Place
2022–23	6	Pref.	13th
2023–24	6	Pref.	10th
2024–25	6	1ª Aut.	1st
2025–26	5	3ª Fed.	8th
2026–27	5	3ª Fed.	

- 2 seasons in Tercera Federación

== Notable players ==
- (Colombia) Neyder Lozano

== See also ==
- UD San Sebastián de los Reyes
