= Neyder Lozano =

Colombian footballer (born 1994)

Personal information
- Full name: Neyder Yessy Lozano Rentería
- Date of birth: 4 March 1994 (age 32)
- Place of birth: Quibdó, Colombia
- Height: 1.85 m (6 ft 1 in)
- Position: Centre back

Youth career
- 2011–2012: Millonarios
- 2013: San Marcelino
- 2013–2014: SS Reyes

Senior career*
Years	Team	Apps	(Gls)
2014–2017	SS Reyes B	71	(6)
2016–2018	SS Reyes	31	(0)
2018–2019	Elche	43	(1)
2019–2022	Granada	0	(0)
2022–2023	Lugo	9	(0)
2023	→ Talavera (loan)	14	(1)
2023–2025	Lleida Esportiu	37	(1)
- * Club domestic league appearances and goals as of 6 April 2025

Neyder Yessy Lozano Rentería (born 4 March 1994) is a Colombian professional footballer who plays as a central defender.

== Club career ==
Born in Quibdó, Lozano moved to Spain in December 2012, aged 18. After finishing his training with CDA San Marcelino, he joined UD San Sebastián de los Reyes, being initially assigned to the reserves in the regional leagues.

Lozano made his first team debut for SS Reyes on 5 March 2017, coming on as a late substitute and being sent off in a 0–0 Segunda División B away draw against Barakaldo CF. He subsequently became a regular starter, and was definitively promoted to the main squad before the 2017–18 season.

On 31 January 2018, Lozano joined fellow third division team Elche CF. He immediately became a starter, contributing with 20 appearances (play-offs included) as his side achieved promotion to Segunda División.

Lozano made his professional debut on 18 August 2018, starting in a 0–0 home draw against Granada CF. He scored his first professional goal on 19 October, netting the opener in a 2–0 home defeat of Málaga CF.

On 1 July 2019, free agent Lozano signed a three-year contract with Granada CF, newly promoted to La Liga. He fractured his tibia shortly after arriving, and remained sidelined for more than two years after failing to recover completely.

In July 2022, after his contract with Granada expired, Lozano went on a trial at CD Lugo, and signed a two-year contract with the club on 22 July. The following 30 January, however, he was loaned to Primera Federación side CF Talavera de la Reina.

== Career statistics ==
=== Club ===
As of match played 26 May 2019

Appearances and goals by club, season and competition
Club	Season	League			National Cup		Continental		Other		Total	
Club	Season	Division	Apps	Goals	Apps	Goals	Apps	Goals	Apps	Goals	Apps	Goals
SS Reyes B	2014–15	Preferente de Madrid	21	2	—		—		—		21	2
SS Reyes B	2015–16	Preferente de Madrid	30	2	—		—		—		30	2
SS Reyes B	2016–17	Preferente de Madrid	20	2	—		—		—		20	2
SS Reyes B	Total		71	6	—		—		—		71	6
SS Reyes	2016–17	Segunda División B	9	0	—		—		2 (Note: Appearance(s) in Relegation Playoffs)	0	11	0
SS Reyes	2017–18	Segunda División B	22	0	0	0	—		—		22	0
SS Reyes	Total		31	0	0	0	—		2	0	33	0
Elche	2017–18	Segunda División B	14	0	0	0	—		6 (Note: Appearance(s) in Promotion Playoffs)	0	20	0
Elche	2018–19	Segunda División	29	1	1	0	—		—		30	1
Elche	Total		43	1	1	0	—		6	0	50	0
Granada	2019–20	La Liga	0	0	0	0	—		—		0	0
Granada	2020–21	La Liga	0	0	0	0	—		—		0	0
Granada	Total		0	0	0	0	—		—		0	0
Career total			145	7	1	0	0	0	8	0	154	7
