= Gonzalo Verdú =

Spanish footballer (born 1988)

Personal information
- Full name: Gonzalo Cacicedo Verdú
- Date of birth: 21 October 1988 (age 38)
- Place of birth: Cartagena, Spain
- Height: 1.85 m (6 ft 1 in)
- Position: Centre-back

Youth career
- La Manga
- Pozo Estrecho
- Cartagena

Senior career*
Years	Team	Apps	(Gls)
2007–2008	Cartagena B		
2008–2009	Pinatar	26	(2)
2009–2010	Novelda	14	(1)
2010–2011	Albacete B	28	(1)
2011	Albacete	6	(0)
2011–2012	Osasuna B	21	(1)
2012–2013	Orihuela	34	(3)
2013–2014	Córdoba B	33	(2)
2014–2015	Guadalajara	33	(2)
2015–2017	Cartagena	50	(4)
2017–2023	Elche	174	(11)
2023–2025	Cartagena	29	(0)
- * Club domestic league appearances and goals as of 8 June 2024

Gonzalo Cacicedo Verdú (born 21 October 1988) is a Spanish professional footballer who plays as a centre-back.

== Club career ==
Born in Cartagena, Region of Murcia, Verdú spent the vast majority of his career in the lower leagues of his country. In 2010–11 he made his professional debut with Albacete Balompié, his input consisting of six games in a relegation-ending season from Segunda División; his first appearance in the competition was on 23 April 2011, playing 60 minutes – as a substitute – in a 4–2 away loss against Xerez CD.

Verdú continued his career in the Segunda División B the following years, representing CA Osasuna B, Orihuela CF, Córdoba CF B, CD Guadalajara, FC Cartagena and Elche CF. He won two promotions in three years with the last of those clubs, reaching La Liga at the end of the 2019–20 campaign with his as one of the captains.

Verdú made his debut in the Spanish top flight on 26 September 2020, starting and being booked in the 0–3 home defeat to Real Sociedad; he was aged 31 years and 11 months. In August 2021, he signed a new contract until 2023.

On 23 October 2022, Verdú scored his only goal in the main division, closing a 2–2 draw at RCD Espanyol. The following June, he left the Estadio Manuel Martínez Valero following the expiration of his link, and signed a two-year deal with his former club Cartagena on 10 July.

On 31 January 2025, after making no appearances for the Efesé during the campaign, Gonzalo terminated his contract with the club.

== Career statistics ==
As of match played 4 June 2023

Appearances and goals by club, season and competition
Club	Season	League			National Cup		Other		Total	
Club	Season	Division	Apps	Goals	Apps	Goals	Apps	Goals	Apps	Goals
Albacete	2010–11	Segunda División	6	0	—		—		6	0
Osasuna B	2011–12	Segunda División B	21	1	—		—		21	1
Orihuela	2012–13	Segunda División B	34	3	1	0	—		35	3
Córdoba B	2013–14	Segunda División B	33	2	—		—		33	2
Guadalajara	2014–15	Segunda División B	33	2	1	0	4 (Note: Appearances in promotion playoffs)	0	38	2
Cartagena	2015–16	Segunda División B	18	1	0	0	—		18	1
Cartagena	2016–17	Segunda División B	32	3	1	0	3	0	36	3
Cartagena	Total		50	4	1	0	3	0	54	4
Elche	2017–18	Segunda División B	32	5	4	1	5	0	41	6
Elche	2018–19	Segunda División	38	2	0	0	—		38	2
Elche	2019–20	Segunda División	36	3	0	0	4	0	40	3
Elche	2020–21	La Liga	33	0	0	0	—		33	0
Elche	2021–22	La Liga	19	0	4	1	—		23	1
Elche	2022–23	La Liga	16	1	2	0	—		18	1
Elche	Total		174	11	10	2	9	0	193	13
Career total			351	23	13	2	16	0	380	25
