= Javi Villar =

Spanish footballer

Personal information
- Full name: Javier Villar del Fraile
- Date of birth: 15 March 2003 (age 23)
- Place of birth: Murcia, Spain
- Height: 1.87 m (6 ft 2 in)
- Position: Midfielder

Team information
- Current team: Albacete
- Number: 18

Youth career
- 2010–2014: Azarbe
- 2014–2018: UCAM Murcia
- 2018–2019: Murcia
- 2019: Barcelona
- 2019–2021: Elche
- 2021–2022: Real Madrid

Senior career*
Years	Team	Apps	(Gls)
2022–2024	Real Madrid B	20	(0)
2023–2024	→ Unionistas (loan)	32	(1)
2024–	Albacete	51	(0)

International career
2021	Spain U19	2	(0)
- * Club domestic league appearances and goals as of 9 June 2026

Javier "Javi" Villar del Fraile (born 15 March 2003) is a Spanish footballer who plays as a midfielder for Albacete Balompié.

== Club career ==
Born in Murcia, Villar began his career with hometown side AD Azarbe, and subsequently represented the youth sides of UCAM Murcia CF and Real Murcia CF before signing for FC Barcelona on 16 July 2019. He was unable to be registered by the latter as they did not have any available spots and, after being offered to be loaned out, he left in September to join Elche CF.

On 7 July 2021, Villar moved to Real Madrid's La Fábrica, being assigned to the Juvenil squad. He made his senior debut with the reserves on 15 May of the following year, coming on as a late substitute for goalscorer Carlos Dotor in a 5–1 Primera División RFEF home routing of UE Costa Brava.

Definitely promoted to Castilla for the 2022–23 season, Villar featured sparingly before being loaned out to fellow third division side Unionistas de Salamanca CF on 26 July 2023. A regular starter for the side, he scored his first senior goal on 28 January 2024, netting the opener in a 3–0 home win over UE Cornellà.

On 8 July 2024, Villar signed a three-year contract with Segunda División side Albacete Balompié. He made his professional debut on 2 November, replacing Lalo Aguilar in a 1–1 away draw against Racing de Santander.

On 14 January 2026, he scored the first goal in his team’s 3-2 victory over his former club Real Madrid.

== International career ==
In August 2021, Villar was called up to the Spain national under-19 team for two friendlies against Mexico. He featured in both matches as Spain won 3–2 and 5–1.

== Personal life ==
Villar's older brother Gonzalo is also a footballer and a midfielder. He too began his career at Elche.
