= Pere Milla =

Spanish footballer

Personal information
- Full name: Pere Milla Peña
- Date of birth: 23 September 1992 (age 34)
- Place of birth: Lleida, Spain
- Height: 1.84 m (6 ft 0 in)
- Position: Winger

Team information
- Current team: Espanyol
- Number: 11

Youth career
- UE Lleida

Senior career*
Years	Team	Apps	(Gls)
2011–2014	Lleida Esportiu	84	(8)
2014–2015	Getafe B	35	(6)
2015	Getafe	0	(0)
2015–2016	Logroñés	36	(18)
2016–2019	Eibar	5	(0)
2016–2017	→ UCAM Murcia (loan)	16	(1)
2017–2018	→ Numancia (loan)	35	(6)
2019–2023	Elche	133	(25)
2023–	Espanyol	91	(14)

International career^{‡}
2019–2022	Catalonia	2	(0)
- * Club domestic league appearances and goals as of 27 May 2026 ‡ National team caps and goals as of 25 March 2022

Pere Milla Peña (born 23 September 1992) is a Spanish professional footballer who plays as a winger for RCD Espanyol.

== Club career ==
Born in Lleida, Catalonia, Milla graduated from UE Lleida's youth setup. After the club's dissolution he was assigned to Lleida Esportiu, being promoted to the first team and making his senior debuts in the 2011–12 campaign, in Segunda División B.

On 11 June 2014, Milla moved to Getafe CF, being assigned to the reserves also in the third level. On 14 January of the following year he played his first match with the main squad, starting in a 1–0 home win against UD Almería, for the campaign's Copa del Rey.

On 20 July 2015, Milla signed a one-year deal with UD Logroñés. On 20 June 2016, after scoring a career-best 18 goals, he joined La Liga side SD Eibar, being loaned to UCAM Murcia CF on 2 August.

Milla scored his first professional goal on 22 April 2017, netting the winner in a 2–1 away success over Girona FC. On 6 July he moved to fellow second division club CD Numancia, on loan for one year.

Ahead of the 2018–19 campaign, Milla returned to the Armeros and was assigned to the first-team. He made his top tier debut on 24 August 2018, starting in a 0–2 away loss against former side Getafe. On 15 June of the following year, after appearing rarely, he signed a contract with Elche CF in the second division.

On 23 August 2020, Milla came off the bench to score Elche's winning goal in the play-offs Final against Girona FC, taking his side back to the top tier after five years. He scored his first goal in the top tier on 18 October, netting the opener in a 2–0 away win over Deportivo Alavés.

On 15 August 2023, Milla signed a four-year contract with RCD Espanyol, freshly relegated to the second division.

== Career statistics ==
As of match played 18 November 2023

Appearances and goals by club, season and competition
Club	Season	League			Cup		Other		Total	
Club	Season	Division	Apps	Goals	Apps	Goals	Apps	Goals	Apps	Goals
Lleida Esportiu	2011–12	Segunda División B	17	1	1	1	—		18	2
Lleida Esportiu	2012–13	Segunda División B	37	4	0	0	4 (Note: Appearance(s) in Promotion Playoffs)	0	41	4
Lleida Esportiu	2013–14	Segunda División B	30	3	2	1	4	2	36	6
Lleida Esportiu	Total		84	8	3	2	8	2	95	12
Getafe B	2014–15	Segunda División B	35	6	0	0	—		35	6
Getafe	2014–15	La Liga	0	0	1	0	—		1	0
Logroñés	2015–16	Segunda División B	36	18	2	0	4	0	42	18
UCAM Murcia (loan)	2016–17	Segunda División	16	1	2	0	—		18	1
Numancia (loan)	2017–18	Segunda División	35	6	5	0	4	0	44	6
Eibar	2018–19	La Liga	5	0	2	0	—		7	0
Elche	2019–20	Segunda División	37	7	3	2	4	1	44	10
Elche	2020–21	La Liga	32	4	0	0	—		32	4
Elche	2021–22	La Liga	32	8	4	0	—		36	8
Elche	2022–23	La Liga	31	6	2	1	—		33	7
Elche	2023–24	Segunda División	1	0	0	0	—		1	0
Elche	Total		133	25	9	3	4	1	146	29
Espanyol	2023–24	Segunda División	14	3	0	0	—		14	3
Career total			358	67	24	5	20	3	402	75
