= José Luis Friaza =

Spanish footballer

Personal information
- Full name: José Luis Friaza Pérez
- Date of birth: 12 May 2002 (age 24)
- Place of birth: Estepa, Spain
- Height: 1.92 m (6 ft 4 in)
- Position: Forward

Team information
- Current team: Toledo
- Number: 11

Youth career
- 2015–2016: Estepa Industrial
- 2016–2017: Peloteros Sierra Sur
- 2017–2020: Puente Genil
- 2020–2021: Elche

Senior career*
Years	Team	Apps	(Gls)
2021–2023	Elche B	36	(12)
2022	Elche	0	(0)
2023–2024	Xerez Deportivo	13	(2)
2024	Gandía	16	(4)
2024–2025	Leganés B	26	(10)
2025–	Toledo	13	(6)
- * Club domestic league appearances and goals as of 21 December 2025

José Luis Friaza Pérez (born 12 May 2002) is a Spanish professional footballer who plays as a forward for CD Toledo.

== Club career ==
Born in Estepa, Seville, Andalusia, Friaza played for local sides Estepa Industrial CD, EF Peloteros Sierra Sur and Puente Genil FC before joining Elche CF's youth setup in 2020. He made his senior debut with the latter's reserves on 17 April 2021, coming on as a second-half substitute in a 0–1 Tercera División away loss against Atlético Saguntino.

Definitely promoted to the B-side ahead of the 2021–22 campaign, Friaza scored his first senior goal on 12 September 2021, netting the second of a 2–0 away win over CF Recambios Colón. On 28 November, he scored a brace in a 5–0 home routing of Silla CF.

Friaza made his first team debut for the Franjiverdes on 20 January 2022, replacing Guido Carrillo in extra time of a 1–2 home loss to Real Madrid in the season's Copa del Rey. He suffered a knee injury in April, only returning to action in January 2023.

On 29 June 2023, Friaza moved to Xerez Deportivo FC also in the fifth tier. He continued to play in that category in the following years, representing CF Gandía, CD Leganés B and CD Toledo.
