= Samuel López (footballer) =

Spanish footballer

Personal information
- Full name: Samuel López Pérez
- Date of birth: 23 October 1991 (age 35)
- Place of birth: Murcia, Spain
- Height: 1.87 m (6 ft 1 1/2 in)
- Position: Forward

Team information
- Current team: Unión Molinense

Youth career
- Murcia

Senior career*
Years	Team	Apps	(Gls)
2010–2012	Murcia B	62	(19)
2011–2014	Murcia	1	(0)
2012–2013	→ Coruxo (loan)	36	(5)
2013–2014	→ Linense (loan)	26	(3)
2014–2015	La Roda	19	(2)
2015–2016	Olímpic Xàtiva	46	(5)
2016–2017	Eldense	20	(2)
2017	Orihuela	6	(0)
2017–2020	Crevillente	61	(17)
2020–2021	Atlético Pulpileño	26	(3)
2021–2022	Racing Murcia	30	(6)
2022–	Unión Molinense	64	(34)
- * Club domestic league appearances and goals as of 13 October 2024

Samuel "Samu" López Pérez (born 23 October 1991), often known as just Samuel, is a Spanish professional footballer who plays for Unión Molinense as a forward.

== Football career ==
Born in Murcia, Samuel graduated from local Real Murcia, and spent his first year as a senior with the B-team playing in the 2010–11 Tercera División. On 10 September 2011 he first appeared for the main squad, playing the last 32 minutes in a 0–2 home loss against UD Almería in the Segunda División.

On 1 August 2012 Samuel was loaned to Coruxo FC of the Segunda División B. He finished the season with 36 appearances (31 starts, 2641 minutes of action) and scoring 5 times, and then joined Real Balompédica Linense, also on loan.

On 2 September 2014, Samuel joined La Roda CF, also in the third tier. On 29 January of the following year he moved to fellow third-tier team CD Olímpic de Xàtiva.
