= Javi Flores =

Spanish footballer

Personal information
- Full name: Javier Flores Santacruz
- Date of birth: 9 February 1986 (age 40)
- Place of birth: Córdoba, Spain
- Height: 1.70 m (5 ft 7 in)
- Position: Attacking midfielder

Youth career
- 1993–2004: Córdoba

Senior career*
Years	Team	Apps	(Gls)
2004–2005	Córdoba B	?	(4)
2005–2011	Córdoba	141	(11)
2011–2012	Getafe B	32	(10)
2012–2014	Elche	4	(1)
2014–2015	Murcia	28	(5)
2015–2017	Hércules	35	(6)
2017–2019	Elche	63	(5)
2019–2023	Córdoba	99	(8)
Total		402+	(50)
- * Club domestic league appearances and goals

Javier "Javi" Flores Santacruz (Spanish pronunciation: [xaˈβjeɾ ˈxaβi ˈfloɾes santaˈkɾuθ]; born 9 February 1986) is a Spanish former professional footballer who played as an attacking midfielder.

He started and finished his career with Córdoba, amassing Segunda División totals of 123 games and five goals over six seasons for that club and Elche. He appeared once in La Liga with the latter.

== Club career ==
Born in Córdoba, Andalusia, Flores spent his entire youth career with Córdoba CF, and made his senior debut with their reserves in the 2004–05 season. He was promoted to the main squad the following year, and achieved promotion to Segunda División in 2007.

Flores missed most of the 2007–08 campaign due to injury, and only played his first match as a professional on 16 March 2008, coming on as a late substitute in a 1–1 away draw against UD Salamanca. He was regularly used subsequently, being released in July 2011.

On 1 September 2011, Flores joined Segunda División B team Getafe CF B. After scoring a career-best ten goals in his only season, he signed with Elche CF of the second division.

On 5 August 2012, during a friendly with AD Alcorcón, Flores suffered a knee injury which kept him sidelined until April 2013. He made his La Liga debut on the last day of 2013–14, featuring 73 minutes in the 3–1 away loss to Sevilla FC.

On 4 June 2014, Flores terminated his contract with the Valencians and moved to third-tier club Real Murcia CF on 2 September. He returned to Elche in 2017, at the end of a two-year spell at Hércules CF in the same league.

Flores returned to the Estadio Nuevo Arcángel in the summer of 2019, as the team had just been relegated to division three.
