= Tekio =

Spanish footballer

Personal information
- Full name: Sergio Blázquez Sánchez
- Date of birth: 30 July 1990 (age 36)
- Place of birth: Molina de Segura, Spain
- Height: 1.88 m (6 ft 2 in)
- Position: Right-back

Team information
- Current team: Torrellano

Youth career
- Molinense
- 2008–2009: Murcia Deportivo

Senior career*
Years	Team	Apps	(Gls)
2007–2008	Molinense		
2009–2011	UCAM Murcia	53	(1)
2011–2013	Valladolid B	20	(0)
2011	Valladolid	9	(0)
2013–2017	UCAM Murcia	126	(0)
2017–2020	Elche	57	(0)
2020–2021	Volos	17	(0)
2021	Logroñés	13	(0)
2022	UCAM Murcia	19	(0)
2022–2024	Racing Cartagena	56	(0)
2024–	Torrellano	1	(0)
- * Club domestic league appearances and goals as of 13 October 2024

Sergio Blázquez Sánchez (born 30 July 1990), commonly known as Tekio, is a Spanish professional footballer who plays for Torrellano in Tercera Federación as a right-back.

== Career ==
Born in Molina de Segura, Region of Murcia, Tekio made his senior debuts with Molinense in the 2007–08 campaign, in the regional leagues. After a brief spell at Murcia Deportivo CF (only registered with the youth sides, however), he joined Tercera División club UCAM Murcia CF in June 2009.

In the 2011 summer Tekio joined Real Valladolid B also in the fourth level, and appeared with the main squad during the whole pre-season. He played his first match as a professional on 3 September, starting in a 2–0 home success over Córdoba in the Segunda División.

Tekio eventually returned to the B-team in December 2011, and rescinded his link with the Pucelanos on 17 January 2013. He signed for former team UCAM Murcia, now in the Segunda División B, in the following day.

=== Volos ===
On 3 June 2021, Greek Super League club Volos announced they awarded Tekio with a renewal of his contract, being one of the key players for the successful 2020–21 season.

One month later, on 6 July 2021, they announced his release and transfer to Spanish 3rd tier Logroñés.
