= Fidel Chaves =

Spanish footballer (born 1989)

Fidel
Personal information
- Full name: Fidel Chaves de la Torre
- Date of birth: 27 October 1989 (age 37)
- Place of birth: La Dehesa de Ríotinto, Spain
- Height: 1.80 m (5 ft 11 in)
- Position: Winger

Team information
- Current team: Eldense
- Number: 10

Youth career
- Recreativo

Senior career*
Years	Team	Apps	(Gls)
2008–2010	Recreativo B	56	(4)
2010–2012	Recreativo	57	(6)
2012–2015	Elche	75	(6)
2014–2015	→ Córdoba (loan)	25	(1)
2015–2016	Córdoba	39	(11)
2016–2018	Almería	71	(12)
2018–2019	Las Palmas	26	(2)
2019–2024	Elche	145	(24)
2024–2025	Albacete	48	(4)
2025–	Eldense	36	(10)
- * Club domestic league appearances and goals as of 18:19, 4 June 2026 (UTC)

Fidel Chaves de la Torre (born 27 October 1989), known simply as Fidel, is a Spanish professional footballer who plays as a left winger for Segunda División club Eldense.

== Club career ==
Born in La Dehesa de Ríotinto, Province of Huelva, Fidel finished his development at local club Recreativo de Huelva, and made his senior debut with the B team in the 2008–09 season, in the Tercera División. He played his first game as a professional on 15 May 2010, coming on as a second-half substitute and scoring his team's goal in a 1–1 Segunda División away draw against Córdoba CF.

On 12 July 2012, Fidel terminated his contract with the Andalusians and joined Elche CF in the same league. He was an ever-present player in his first year, and also scored four goals as the Valencians returned to La Liga after 24 years of absence.

Fidel made his top-flight debut on 19 August 2013, playing 33 minutes in a 3–0 loss at Rayo Vallecano. His first league goal came on 20 October, the winner in a 2–1 away victory over Real Betis.

On 9 July 2014, Fidel joined fellow second-division side Córdoba in a loan deal. After appearing regularly, he agreed to a permanent move in May 2015.

On 19 July 2016, after scoring a career-best 11 goals during the campaign to earn a place in its All-Star team, Fidel put pen to paper to a five-year contract at UD Almería. On 18 June 2018, he signed a three-year deal with second-tier UD Las Palmas.

Fidel rescinded his contract with the Canarians on 14 June 2019, and returned to Elche just hours later. The first goals of his second spell came on 3 November, when he scored a hat-trick – two from the penalty spot – in a 4–2 home defeat of CD Mirandés.

On 1 February 2024, Fidel terminated his contract at the Estadio Martínez Valero. He signed an 18-month deal with Albacete Balompié also from division two on the same day.

On 25 July 2025, Fidel joined CD Eldense on a two-year deal.

== Career statistics ==
As of match played 22 May 2021

Appearances and goals by club, season and competition
Club	Season	League			National Cup		Other		Total	
Club	Season	Division	Apps	Goals	Apps	Goals	Apps	Goals	Apps	Goals
Recreativo	2009–10	Segunda División	6	2	0	0	—		6	2
Recreativo	2010–11	Segunda División	24	1	1	0	—		25	1
Recreativo	2011–12	Segunda División	27	3	1	0	—		28	3
Recreativo	Total		57	6	2	0	0	0	59	6
Elche	2012–13	Segunda División	40	4	1	0	—		41	4
Elche	2013–14	La Liga	35	2	1	0	—		36	2
Elche	Total		75	6	2	0	0	0	77	6
Córdoba (loan)	2014–15	La Liga	25	1	1	0	—		26	1
Córdoba	2015–16	Segunda División	39	11	1	0	2 (Note: Appearances in La Liga play-offs)	0	42	11
Almería	2016–17	Segunda División	40	8	0	0	—		40	8
Almería	2017–18	Segunda División	31	4	0	0	—		31	4
Almería	Total		71	12	0	0	0	0	71	12
Las Palmas	2018–19	Segunda División	26	2	0	0	—		26	2
Elche	2019–20	Segunda División	38	9	2	1	4	0	44	10
Elche	2020–21	La Liga	30	6	0	0	—		30	6
Elche	Total		68	15	2	1	4	0	74	16
Career total			361	53	8	1	6	0	375	54

== Honours ==
Elche

- Segunda División: 2012–13

Individual

- Segunda División Player of the Month: November 2019
