= 2021–22 Málaga CF season =

Málaga CF
2021–22 season
- Owner: Abdullah Al Thani
- Head coach: José Alberto (until 25 January); Natxo González (from 27 January until 2 April); Pablo Guede (from 2 April)
- Stadium: La Rosaleda
- Segunda División: 18th
- Copa del Rey: Second round

The 2021–22 season was the 74th season in the existence of Málaga CF and the club's fourth consecutive season in the second division of Spanish football. In addition to the domestic league, Málaga participated in this season's edition of the Copa del Rey.

== Players ==
=== First-team squad ===
As of 31 March 2022

Note: Flags indicate national team as defined under FIFA eligibility rules; some limited exceptions apply. Players may hold more than one non-FIFA nationality.

No.	Pos.	Nation	Player
1	GK	ESP	Dani Barrio
2	DF	ESP	Víctor Gómez (on loan from Espanyol)
3	DF	ESP	Javi Jiménez
4	DF	ESP	David Lombán (captain)
5	DF	ESP	Juande
6	MF	ESP	Ramón
7	MF	ESP	Paulino de la Fuente
8	MF	ESP	Luis Muñoz (vice-captain)
9	FW	ESP	Brandon Thomas
10	MF	ESP	Jairo Samperio
11	MF	MAR	Hicham
12	FW	ARG	Pablo Chavarría
13	GK	ESP	Dani Martín (on loan from Betis)
14	MF	ESP	Aleix Febas (on loan from Mallorca)
15	FW	ESP	Antoñín (on loan from Granada)
16	DF	ESP	Genaro Rodríguez
17	DF	FRA	Mathieu Peybernes
18	MF	ESP	Álvaro Vadillo (on loan from Espanyol)
19	MF	ESP	Jozabed

No.	Pos.	Nation	Player
20	DF	ESP	Ismael (4th captain)
21	FW	ESP	Adrián López
22	FW	SEN	Sekou Gassama (on loan from Valladolid)
23	DF	ESP	Alberto Escassi (3rd captain)
24	DF	ARG	Braian Cufré (on loan from Mallorca)
26	MF	ESP	Ismael Gutiérrez (on loan from Atlético de Madrid)
28	DF	ESP	Alejandro Benítez
29	FW	ESP	Loren Zúñiga
30	DF	ESP	Alberto Quintana
31	DF	ESP	Andrés
32	FW	ESP	Julio
33	MF	ESP	David Larrubia
34	MF	MAR	Haitam Abaida
37	MF	ESP	Kevin
39	MF	ESP	Roberto
41	DF	MLI	Moussa Diarra
42	MF	ESP	Dani Lorenzo
—	MF	MLI	Issa Fomba

=== Reserve team ===
Note: Flags indicate national team as defined under FIFA eligibility rules; some limited exceptions apply. Players may hold more than one non-FIFA nationality.

No.	Pos.	Nation	Player
27	GK	SWE	Daniel Strindholm
36	GK	ESP	Antonio Santos
38	DF	MAR	Bilal

=== On loan ===
Note: Flags indicate national team as defined under FIFA eligibility rules; some limited exceptions apply. Players may hold more than one non-FIFA nationality.

No.	Pos.	Nation	Player
—	GK	ARG	Gonzalo (at Badajoz until 30 June 2022)
—	DF	ESP	Iván Calero (at Alcorcón until 30 June 2022)
—	DF	ESP	Cristo (at Real Sociedad B until 30 June 2022)

== Pre-season and friendlies ==
Win Draw Loss Fixtures

31 July 2021 Friendly	Málaga	0–3	Alcorcón	Benahavís, Spain
10:00 CEST (UTC+2)				Stadium: Campo La Quinta

31 July 2021 Friendly	Málaga	1–1	Almería	Marbella, Spain
19:00 CEST (UTC+2)				Stadium: Marbella Football Center

6 August 2021 Friendly	Granada	3–1	Málaga	Granada, Spain
20:30 CEST (UTC+2)				Stadium: Nuevo Los Cármenes

14 January 2022 Friendly	Málaga	0–1	Waasland-Beveren	Málaga, Spain
11:00 CET (UTC+1)				Stadium: Estadio La Rosaleda

== Competitions ==
=== Overall record ===
Competition	First match	Last match	Starting round	Final position	Record							
Competition	First match	Last match	Starting round	Final position	Pld	W	D	L	GF	GA	GD	Win %
Segunda División	16 August 2021	28 May 2022	Matchday 1	18th	42	11	12	19	36	57	−21	26.19
Copa del Rey	2 December 2021	14 December 2021	First round	Second round	2	1	0	1	3	1	+2	50.00
Total					44	12	12	20	39	58	−19	27.27

Source: Soccerway

=== Segunda División ===
==== League table ====
Pos	Team	Pld	W	D	L	GF	GA	GD	Pts	Qualification or relegation
16	Lugo	42	10	20	12	46	52	−6	50	
17	Sporting Gijón	42	11	13	18	43	48	−5	46	
18	Málaga	42	11	12	19	36	57	−21	45	
19	Amorebieta (R)	42	9	16	17	44	63	−19	43	Relegation to Primera Federación
20	Real Sociedad B (R)	42	10	10	22	43	61	−18	40	Relegation to Primera Federación

Source: LaLiga SmartBank
Rules for classification: 1) points; 2) head-to-head points; 3) head-to-head goal difference; 4) goal difference; 5) number of goals scored
(R) Relegated

==== Results summary ====
Overall								Home						Away					
Pld	W	D	L	GF	GA	GD	Pts	W	D	L	GF	GA	GD	W	D	L	GF	GA	GD
42	11	12	19	36	57	−21	45	7	7	7	18	24	−6	4	5	12	18	33	−15

Source: La Liga SmartBank

==== Results by round ====
Round	1	2	3	4	5	6	7	8	9	10	11	12	13	14	15	16	17	18	19	20	21	22	23	24	25	26	27	28	29	30	31	32	33	34	35	36	37	38	39	40	41	42
Ground	H	A	H	A	H	A	A	H	A	H	A	H	A	H	A	H	H	A	H	A	H	A	H	H	A	A	H	A	H	A	H	A	H	A	H	A	H	A	H	A	H	A
Result	D	D	W	L	W	L	L	W	D	D	D	W	L	W	L	W	W	L	L	D	L	W	D	L	L	D	L	L	D	W	D	L	L	L	D	W	L	L	D	W	L	L
Position	13	11	7	14	6	10	16	10	11	13	13	9	11	8	11	7	7	7	11	11	13	10	11	14	14	15	16	17	18	16	16	17	18	18	18	18	18	18	18	18	18	18

Source: La Liga SmartBank
A = Away; H = Home; W = Win; D = Draw; L = Loss

==== Matches ====
The league fixtures were announced on 30 June 2021.

16 August 2021 1	Málaga	0–0	Mirandés	Málaga
20:00 CEST (UTC+2)		Report		Stadium: La Rosaleda; Attendance: 6,519; Referee: Juan Luis Pulido Santana

22 August 2021 2	Ibiza	2–2	Málaga	Ibiza
17:00 CEST (UTC+2)	Bogusz 19', 61'	Report	Muñoz 63'; Fernández 87'	Stadium: Can Misses; Attendance: 2,487; Referee: Óliver de la Fuente Ramos

27 August 2021 3	Málaga	1–0	Alcorcón	Málaga
22:00 CEST (UTC+2)	Escassi 35', (yellow card) 77' (yellow-red card) 90+6'	Report		Stadium: La Rosaleda; Attendance: 6,884; Referee: Aitor Gorostegui Fernández-Ortega

4 September 2021 4	Almería	2–0	Málaga	Almería
21:00 CEST (UTC+2)	Martos (yellow card) 22' (yellow-red card) 46'; Sadiq 51'; Chumi 58'	Report		Stadium: Estadio de los Juegos Mediterráneos; Referee: Jon Ander González Esteban

12 September 2021 5	Málaga	2–0	Girona	Málaga
21:30 CEST (UTC+2)	Paulino 41', 90+4'	Report		Stadium: La Rosaleda; Referee: José Antonio López Toca

19 September 2021 6	Ponferradina	4–0	Málaga	Ponferrada
16:00 CEST (UTC+2)				Stadium: El Toralín

26 September 2021 7	Sporting Gijón	2–1	Málaga	Gijón
16:00 CEST (UTC+2)				Stadium: El Molinón

11 December 2021 20	Eibar	2–2	Málaga	Eibar
20:30 CET (UTC+1)	Stoichkov 25' (pen.); José Corpas 27' (yellow card) 80'; Sergio Álvarez (yellow card) 89'	Report	Gassama 6'; Lombán (yellow card) 23'; Brandon Thomas 82'	Stadium: Ipurua; Attendance: 3,921; Referee: (Spain) Rubén Ávalos Barrera

12 February 2022 27	Málaga	0–1	Almería	Málaga
20:30 CET	Alberto Escassi (yellow card) 21'; Peybernes (yellow card) 75'; Víctor Gómez (yellow card) 90+3'	Report	Sergio Akieme (yellow card) 34'; Sadiq 53'; Robertone (yellow card) 86'	Stadium: La Rosaleda Stadium; Attendance: 17,267; Referee: Jon González Esteban

23 April 2022 37	Málaga	1–3	Eibar	Málaga
18:30 CET (UTC+1)	Brandon Thomas 4' (yellow card) 90+4'; Alberto Escassi (red card) 31'; Javi Jiménez (yellow card) 43'; Ramón Enríquez (yellow card) 45'; Kevin Villodres (yellow card) 50'; Luis Muñoz (red card) 69'; Dani Barrio (yellow card) 69'; Paulino (yellow card) 70'; Víctor Gómez (yellow card) 90+5'	Report	José Corpas 37' (pen.); Toño (yellow card) 63'; Llorente (yellow card) 73'; Fran Sol 78' 90+6'; Álvaro Tejero (yellow card) 82'	Stadium: La Rosaleda; Attendance: 17,667; Referee: (Spain) Javier Iglesias Villanueva
