= 2020–21 Málaga CF season =

Málaga
2020–21 season
- President: José María Muñoz
- Head coach: Sergio Pellicer
- Stadium: La Rosaleda
- Segunda División: 12th
- Copa del Rey: Round of 32
- Top goalscorer: League: Yanis Rahmani; Luis Muñoz (5 each); All: Yanis Rahmani (6)
Home colours	Away colours

The 2020–21 Málaga CF season was the club's 73rd season in existence and its third consecutive season in the second division of Spanish football. In addition to the domestic league, Málaga participated in this season's edition of the Copa del Rey. The season covered the period from 20 July 2020 to 30 June 2021.

== Players ==
=== First-team squad ===
As of 31 May 2021

Note: Flags indicate national team as defined under FIFA eligibility rules; some limited exceptions apply. Players may hold more than one non-FIFA nationality.

No.	Pos.	Nation	Player
1	GK	ESP	Juan Soriano (on loan from Sevilla)
2	DF	VEN	Josua Mejías (on loan from Leganés)
4	DF	ESP	David Lombán (captain)
5	DF	ESP	Juande
7	MF	ESP	Cristian Rodríguez (on loan from Extremadura)
8	MF	ESP	Luis Muñoz (vice-captain)
10	MF	ESP	Jairo Samperio
11	MF	ESP	Joaquín Muñoz (on loan from Huesca)
12	FW	ARG	Pablo Chavarría
13	GK	ESP	Dani Barrio
14	FW	SRB	Stefan Šćepović
17	MF	FRA	Yanis Rahmani (on loan from Almería)
18	DF	ESP	Matos (on loan from Cádiz)
19	MF	ESP	Jozabed (on loan from Celta)
20	FW	ESP	Caye Quintana (on loan from Cádiz)
21	DF	ESP	Iván Calero
22	DF	VEN	Alexander González

No.	Pos.	Nation	Player
23	DF	ESP	Alberto Escassi (3rd captain)
24	MF	ALG	Mohamed Benkhemassa
26	DF	ESP	Ismael (4th captain)
28	DF	ESP	Alejandro Benítez
29	GK	ARG	Gonzalo
30	MF	ESP	Ramón
31	MF	MAR	Hicham
32	DF	ESP	Alberto Quintana
33	DF	ESP	Cristo
34	FW	ESP	Julio
35	MF	ESP	Sergio Guerrero
36	MF	MLI	Issa Fomba
39	MF	ESP	David Larrubia
43	MF	ESP	Juan Cruz
45	FW	ESP	Loren Zúñiga
46	MF	MAR	Haitam Abaida
47	DF	ESP	Andrés

=== Reserve team ===
Note: Flags indicate national team as defined under FIFA eligibility rules; some limited exceptions apply. Players may hold more than one non-FIFA nationality.

No.	Pos.	Nation	Player
38	FW	ESP	Jesús Hoyos
40	DF	ESP	Eu
42	GK	SWE	Daniel Strindholm
44	MF	ESP	Kevin
49	GK	ESP	Miguel

No.	Pos.	Nation	Player
50	MF	ESP	Roberto
51	MF	ESP	Christian Delgado
52	FW	MAR	Bilal
53	DF	ESP	Ángel Recio

=== Out on loan ===
Note: Flags indicate national team as defined under FIFA eligibility rules; some limited exceptions apply. Players may hold more than one non-FIFA nationality.

No.	Pos.	Nation	Player
—	GK	ESP	Kellyan (at UD Ibiza until 30 June 2021)

== Transfers ==
=== In ===
No.	Pos	Player	Transferred from	Fee	Date	Source
9	FW	(Portugal) Orlando Sá		Free	13 August 2020	
7	MF	(Spain) Cristian Rodríguez	(Spain) Extremadura	Loan	18 August 2020	
13	GK	(Spain) Dani Barrio		Free	28 August 2020	
21	DF	(Spain) Iván Calero		Free	28 August 2020	
23	DF	(Spain) Alberto Escassi		Free	28 August 2020	
17	MF	(France) Yanis Rahmani	(Spain) Almería	Loan	1 September 2020	
20	FW	(Spain) Caye Quintana	(Spain) Cádiz	Loan	7 September 2020	
19	MF	(Spain) Jozabed	(Spain) Celta de Vigo	Loan	16 September 2020	
18	DF	(Spain) Matos	(Spain) Cádiz	Loan	16 September 2020	

=== Out ===
No.	Pos	Player	Transferred to	Fee	Date	Source
9	FW	(Albania) Armando Sadiku	(Spain) Levante	Loan return	22 July 2020	
17	FW	(Spain) Sergio Buenacasa	(Spain) Mallorca	Loan return	22 July 2020	
–	GK	(Morocco) Munir Mohamedi	(Turkey) Hatayspor	Free	4 September 2020	

== Pre-season and friendlies ==
Win Draw Loss

23 August 2020 Friendly	Málaga	1–0	Valladolid	Marbella, Spain
19:00 CEST (UTC+2)	Adrián 80'	Report		Stadium: Marbella Football Center; Attendance: 0 Referee: Francisco Sáez Vital

26 August 2020 Friendly	Málaga	1–2	Cádiz	Marbella, Spain
19:00 CEST (UTC+2)	Hoyos 13'	Report	Mauro 29'; González 90+2'	Stadium: Dama de Noche Pitches; Attendance: 0

30 August 2020 Friendly	Málaga	0–0	Granada	San Pedro de Alcántara, Spain
19:00 CEST (UTC+2)		Report		Stadium: Marbella Football Center; Attendance: 0 Referee: José Luis Guzmán Mansilla

2 September 2020 Friendly	Espanyol	3–0	Málaga	San Pedro de Alcántara, Spain
18:45 CEST (UTC+2)	Embarba 20'; Puado 30'; Wu Lei 52'	Report		Stadium: Marbella Football Center; Attendance: 0

5 September 2020 Friendly	Málaga	0–2	Alcorcón	Coín, Spain
19:30 CEST (UTC+2)		Report	Barbero 41'; Gual 66'	Stadium: Estadio Jose Burgos De Quintana; Attendance: 0

== Competitions ==
=== Overview ===
Competition	First match	Last match	Starting round	Final position	Record							
Competition	First match	Last match	Starting round	Final position	Pld	W	D	L	GF	GA	GD	Win %
Segunda División	13 September 2020	30 May 2021	Matchday 1	12th	42	14	11	17	37	47	−10	33.33
Copa del Rey	16 December 2020	17 January 2021	First round	Round of 32	3	2	0	1	6	2	+4	66.67
Total					45	16	11	18	43	49	−6	35.56

Source: Soccerway

=== Segunda División ===
==== League table ====
Pos	Team	Pld	W	D	L	GF	GA	GD	Pts
10	Mirandés	42	14	12	16	38	41	−3	54 (Note: Head-to-head points: Mirandés: 6, Fuenlabrada: 0)
11	Fuenlabrada	42	12	18	12	45	46	−1	54
12	Málaga	42	14	11	17	37	47	−10	53
13	Oviedo	42	11	19	12	45	46	−1	52 (Note: Head-to-head points: Oviedo: 4, Tenerife: 1)
14	Tenerife	42	13	13	16	36	36	0	52

Source: LaLiga
Rules for classification: 1) points; 2) head-to-head points; 3) head-to-head goal difference; 4) goal difference; 5) number of goals scored

==== Results summary ====
Overall								Home						Away					
Pld	W	D	L	GF	GA	GD	Pts	W	D	L	GF	GA	GD	W	D	L	GF	GA	GD
42	14	11	17	37	47	−10	53	6	7	8	20	22	−2	8	4	9	17	25	−8

Source: La Liga

==== Results by round ====
Round	1	2	3	4	5	6	7	8	9	10	11	12	13	14	15	16	17	18	19	20	21	22	23	24	25	26	27	28	29	30	31	32	33	34	35	36	37	38	39	40	41	42
Ground	A	A	H	A	H	A	H	H	A	H	A	A	H	A	H	A	H	A	H	A	H	H	A	H	A	H	A	H	A	H	A	H	A	H	A	H	A	H	A	H	A	H
Result	L	W	W	L	D	W	W	D	L	L	W	D	L	W	D	W	L	L	D	D	D	L	W	L	L	W	L	W	W	D	D	L	W	W	D	L	L	D	L	L	L	W
Position	21	11	6	9	11	6	5	5	6	12	7	8	13	9	11	7	9	12	12	13	11	15	12	12	15	12	14	10	9	10	10	11	9	9	9	10	11	11	14	15	15	12

Source: La Liga
A = Away; H = Home; W = Win; D = Draw; L = Loss

==== Matches ====
The league fixtures were announced on 31 August 2020.

13 September 2020 1	Tenerife	2–0	Málaga	Santa Cruz de Tenerife
21:00 CEST (UTC+2)	Suso 42'; Jacobo 56'	Report		Stadium: Heliodoro Rodríguez López; Attendance: 0 (Note: The match was played behind closed doors due to the COVID-19 pandemic in Spain.); Referee: Eduardo Prieto Iglesias

19 September 2020 2	Castellón	0–1	Málaga	Castellón
18:15 CEST (UTC+2)		Report	Ramón 18'	Stadium: Nou Estadi Castàlia; Attendance: 0 Referee: Rafael Sánchez López

26 September 2020 3	Málaga	1–0	Alcorcón	Málaga
18:15 CEST (UTC+2)	Cristian 43'; Ramón (yellow card) 66'	Report	Boateng (yellow card) 50' (yellow-red card) 85'	Stadium: La Rosaleda; Attendance: 0 Referee: Juan Luis Pulido Santana

3 October 2020 4	Rayo Vallecano	4–0	Málaga	Madrid
21:00 CEST (UTC+2)	Isi 18' (pen.); Juande 21' (o.g.); Pozo 58'; Valentín (yellow card) 60'; Antoñín 90+3'	Report	Benkhemassa (yellow card) 45+4'	Stadium: Vallecas; Attendance: 0 Referee: Dámaso Arcediano Monescillo

11 October 2020 5	Málaga	0–0	Las Palmas	Málaga
16:00 CEST (UTC+2)	Rahmani (yellow card) 38'; Escassi (yellow card) 60'; Juande (yellow card) 83'	Report	Suárez (red card) 40'; Ruiz (yellow card) 52'; Valles (yellow card) 90+4'	Stadium: La Rosaleda; Attendance: 0 Referee: Saúl Ais Reig

18 October 2020 6	Zaragoza	1–2	Málaga	Zaragoza
18:15 CEST (UTC+2)	Adrián 83'; Tejero (yellow card) 90+4'	Report	Chavarría 14', (yellow card) 62'; Quintana 26'; Juande (yellow card) 33'	Stadium: La Romareda; Attendance: 0 Referee: Miguel Ángel Ortiz Arias

22 October 2020 7	Málaga	1–0	Sporting Gijón	Málaga
21:30 CEST (UTC+2)	Juande 21'; Lombán (yellow card) 90+5'	Report	Čumić (yellow card) 18'; Đurđević (yellow card) 90+7'	Stadium: La Rosaleda; Attendance: 0 Referee: Eduardo Prieto Iglesias

25 October 2020 8	Málaga	1–1	Mirandés	Málaga
20:30 CEST (UTC+2)	Jozabed 16'	Report	Jirka 53'; Berrocal (yellow card) 71'; Gómez (yellow card) 90+2'	Stadium: La Rosaleda; Attendance: 0 Referee: Iñaki Bikandi Garrido

29 October 2020 9	Mallorca	3–1	Málaga	Palma de Mallorca
19:00 CEST (UTC+2)	Amath 10'; Sevilla (yellow card) 25'; De Galarreta (yellow card) 40'; Raíllo 50'; Rodríguez 73'	Report	Muñoz (yellow card) 58'; Chavarría 67'; Matos (yellow card) 78'	Stadium: Visit Mallorca Stadium; Attendance: 0 Referee: Oliver De La Fuente

2 November 2020 10	Málaga	0–3	Espanyol	Málaga
21:00 CET (UTC+1)	Calero (yellow card) 26'; Chavarría (yellow card) 64'	Report	Embarba 7', 56', (yellow card) 42'; Miguelón (yellow card) 30'; De Tomás 51'	Stadium: La Rosaleda; Attendance: 0 Referee: Saúl Ais Reig

8 November 2020 11	Sabadell	1–2	Málaga	Sabadell
14:00 CET (UTC+1)	Querol 18'	Report	Calero 16'; Chavarría 75'	Stadium: Estadi de la Nova Creu Alta; Attendance: 0 Referee: Juan Luis Pulido Santana

15 November 2020 12	Ponferradina	1–1	Málaga	Ponferrada
16:15 CET (UTC+1)	Curro 74'	Report	Rahmani 16'	Stadium: El Toralín; Attendance: 0 Referee: Alejandro Muñiz Ruiz

21 November 2020 13	Málaga	1–2	Leganés	Málaga
14:00 CET (UTC+1)	Muñoz (yellow card) 26'; Juande 63', (yellow card) 70'	Report	Perea (yellow card) 20'; Juande 33' (o.g.); Bustinza (yellow card) 44'; Merino 71' (pen.); Tarín (yellow card) 86'	Stadium: La Rosaleda; Attendance: 0 Referee: Oliver De La Fuente

24 November 2020 14	Girona	0–1	Málaga	Girona
19:00 CET (UTC+1)		Report	Escassi 33'	Stadium: Montilivi; Attendance: 0 Referee: Miguel Ángel Ortiz Arias

27 November 2020 15	Málaga	2–2	Lugo	Málaga
21:00 CET (UTC+1)	Juande 70', 88'	Report	Rama 27'; Venâncio 40'	Stadium: La Rosaleda; Attendance: 0 Referee: Dámaso Arcediano Monescillo

1 December 2020 16	Fuenlabrada	0–2	Málaga	Fuenlabrada
19:00 CET (UTC+1)		Report	Rahmani 36'; Ramón 85'	Stadium: Fernando Torres; Attendance: 0 Referee: Iosu Galech Apezteguía

5 December 2020 17	Málaga	1–2	Cartagena	Málaga
20:30 CET (UTC+1)	Martínez 17' (o.g.)	Report	Gallar 29'; De la Bella 58'	Stadium: La Rosaleda; Attendance: 0 Referee: Juan Luis Pulido Santana

13 December 2020 18	Almería	3–1	Málaga	Almería
16:00 CET (UTC+1)	Sadiq 11'; Aketxe (yellow card) 15'; Maraš (yellow card) 22', (goal) 78'; Corpas (yellow card) 60'; Ramazani (yellow card) 70', (goal) 90+3'; Balliu (yellow card) 85'; Petrović (yellow card) 88'; Cuenca (yellow card) 90+2'	Report	Muñoz 45+3'; Mejías (yellow card) 60'; Chavarría (yellow card) 80'	Stadium: Estadio de los Juegos Mediterráneos; Attendance: 0 Referee: Daniel Jesús Trujillo Suárez

20 December 2020 19	Málaga	0–0	UD Logroñés	Málaga
20:30 CET (UTC+1)		Report		Stadium: La Rosaleda; Attendance: 0 Referee: Álvaro Moreno Aragón

3 January 2021 20	Albacete	1–1	Málaga	Albacete
18:15 CET (UTC+1)	Kecojević (yellow card) 15'; Ortuño 53' (pen.)	Report	Rodríguez (yellow card) 2'; Jairo 50'; Muñoz (yellow card) 73'	Stadium: Carlos Belmonte; Attendance: 0 Referee: Jon Ander González Esteban

9 January 2021 21	Málaga	1–1	Oviedo	Málaga
18:15 CET (UTC+1)	Rahmani 13'	Report	Nahuel 51'	Stadium: La Rosaleda; Attendance: 0 Referee: David Gálvez Rascón

23 January 2021 22	Málaga	0–2	Ponferradina	Málaga
20:30 CET (UTC+1)		Report	Sielva 16'; Panadero 88'	Stadium: La Rosaleda; Attendance: 0 Referee: Javier Iglesias Villanueva

30 January 2021 23	Alcorcón	0–1	Málaga	Alcorcón
18:15 CET (UTC+1)	García (yellow card) 51'; José Carlos (yellow card) 83'	Report	Ramón (yellow card) 15'; Escassi (yellow card) 45'; Chavarría 90+2'	Stadium: Santo Domingo; Attendance: 0 Referee: Saúl Ais Reig

7 February 2021 24	Málaga	1–2	Zaragoza	Málaga
16:00 CET (UTC+1)	González (yellow card) 24'; Muñoz 82'; Casas (yellow card) 90+1'; Sá (yellow card) 90+2'	Report	Igbekeme 11'; Vigaray 45'	Stadium: La Rosaleda; Attendance: 0 Referee: Daniel Jesús Trujillo Suárez

14 February 2021 25	Sporting Gijón	1–0	Málaga	Gijón
21:00 CET (UTC+1)	Đurđević 48'	Report		Stadium: El Molinón; Attendance: 0 Referee: Óliver de la Fuente Ramos

21 February 2021 26	Málaga	2–0	Rayo Vallecano	Málaga
21:00 CET (UTC+1)	Joaquín 3'; Muñoz 25'	Report		Stadium: La Rosaleda; Attendance: 0 Referee: Gorka Sagués Oscoz

1 March 2021 27	Mirandés	1–0	Málaga	Miranda de Ebro
19:00 CET (UTC+1)	Vivian 73'	Report		Stadium: Estadio Municipal de Anduva; Attendance: 0 Referee: Iñaki Vicandi Garrido

7 March 2021 28	Málaga	2–0	Sabadell	Málaga
14:00 CET (UTC+1)	Muñoz 62', 90+5' (pen.)	Report		Stadium: La Rosaleda; Attendance: 0 Referee: Miguel Ángel Ortiz Arias

14 March 2021 29	UD Logroñés	0–1	Málaga	Logroño
14:00 CET (UTC+1)		Report	Rahmani 43'	Stadium: Las Gaunas; Attendance: 0 Referee: Saúl Ais Reig

21 March 2021 30	Málaga	1–1	Tenerife	Málaga
16:00 CET (UTC+1)	Muñoz 23'	Report	Folch 79'	Stadium: La Rosaleda; Attendance: 0 Referee: Daniel Ocón Arráiz

27 March 2021 31	Cartagena	1–1	Málaga	Cartagena
20:30 CET (UTC+1)	Cayarga 14'	Report	Jozabed 81'	Stadium: Cartagonova; Attendance: 0 Referee: Alejandro Muñiz Ruiz

30 March 2021 32	Málaga	0–3	Almería	Málaga
19:30 CEST (UTC+2)	Mejías (yellow card) 36'	Report	Robertone 12'; Lazo 29'; Makaridze (yellow card) 73'; Sadiq 77'	Stadium: La Rosaleda; Attendance: 0 Referee: Rubén Ávalos Barrera

4 April 2021 33	Lugo	0–1	Málaga	Lugo
18:15 CEST (UTC+2)		Report	Lombán 84'	Stadium: Anxo Carro; Attendance: 0 Referee: David Gálvez Rascón

11 April 2021 34	Málaga	2–0	Albacete	Málaga
14:00 CEST (UTC+2)	Rahmani 23'; Quintana 56'	Report	Israfilov (yellow card) 33'; Fuster (yellow card) 63'; Vargas (yellow card) 90+1'	Stadium: La Rosaleda; Attendance: 0 Referee: Daniel Jesús Trujillo Suárez

17 April 2021 35	Las Palmas	1–1	Málaga	Las Palmas
18:15 CEST (UTC+2)	Clemente (yellow card) 11'; Suárez (yellow card) 49'; Lemos (yellow card) 60'; Araujo 85'	Report	Benítez (yellow card) 16'; Juande (yellow card) 18'; Šćepović 78'	Stadium: Estadio Gran Canaria; Attendance: 0 Referee: Aitor Gorostegui Fernández Ortega

24 April 2021 36	Málaga	0–1	Fuenlabrada	Málaga
16:00 CEST (UTC+2)		Report	Nteka 11' (pen.)	Stadium: La Rosaleda; Attendance: 0 Referee: Javier Iglesias Villanueva

2 May 2021 37	Espanyol	3–0	Málaga	Cornellà de Llobregat
16:00 CEST (UTC+2)	De Tomás 15', 77'; Puado 40'; Embarba (yellow card) 44'; Bare (yellow card) 66'; Lozano (yellow card) 85'	Report	González (yellow card) 45'	Stadium: RCDE Stadium; Attendance: 0 Referee: Miguel Ángel Ortiz Arias

8 May 2021 38	Málaga	1–1	Mallorca	Málaga
21:00 CEST (UTC+2)	Lombán 10' (pen.); Cristo (yellow card) 51'; Juande (yellow card) 61'; Rodríguez (yellow card) 64'	Report	Junior 29'; Sastre (yellow card) 65'; Mboula (yellow card) 79'; Raíllo (yellow card) 90+2'; Oliván (yellow card) 90+4'	Stadium: La Rosaleda; Attendance: 0 Referee: Francisco José Hernández Maeso

17 May 2021 39	Oviedo	1–0	Málaga	Oviedo
19:00 CEST (UTC+2)	Ahijado 61'	Report		Stadium: Carlos Tartiere; Attendance: 0 Referee: Óliver de la Fuente Ramos

20 May 2021 40	Málaga	0–1	Girona	Málaga
19:00 CEST (UTC+2)	Mejías (red card) 16'; Escassi (yellow card) 16'; Jairo (yellow card) 29'; Joaquín (yellow card) 40'; Matos (yellow card) 66'; Rodríguez (yellow card) 90+3'	Report	Gumbau (yellow card) 19'; Monchu (yellow card) 33'; Bueno 62', (yellow card) 86'	Stadium: La Rosaleda; Attendance: 0 Referee: Álvaro Moreno Aragón

24 May 2021 41	Leganés	1–0	Málaga	Leganés
21:00 CEST (UTC+2)	Eraso (yellow card) 25'; Miguel (yellow card) 74'; Pérez (yellow card) 83'; Ibáñez 88'	Report	Juande (yellow card) 71'; Escassi (yellow card) 85'	Stadium: Estadio Municipal de Butarque; Attendance: 0 Referee: Rubén Ávalos Barrera

30 May 2021 42	Málaga	3–0	Castellón	Málaga
21:00 CEST (UTC+2)	Quintana 42'; Šćepović 65', 86'	Report		Stadium: La Rosaleda; Attendance: 0 Referee: José Antonio López Toca

=== Copa del Rey ===
16 December 2020 First round	Coruxo	0–4	Málaga	Vigo
15:15 CET (UTC+1)		Report	Sá 18'; Juan Cruz 65'; Rahmani 76'; Quintana 90+2'	Stadium: O Vao; Referee: Jon Ander González Esteban

6 January 2021 Second round	Málaga	1–0 (a.e.t.)	Oviedo	Málaga
21:00 CET (UTC+1)	Chavarría 118'	Report		Stadium: La Rosaleda; Referee: Juan Luis Pulido Santana

17 January 2021 Round of 32	Málaga	1–2	Granada	Málaga
12:00 CET (UTC+1)	Quintana 76'; Juande (yellow card) 78'	Report	Fede 16'; Molina 28'	Stadium: La Rosaleda; Referee: Carlos del Cerro Grande

== Statistics ==
=== Appearances and goals ===
Last updated on 30 May 2021

No.	Pos	Nat	Player	Total		Segunda División		Copa del Rey	
No.	Pos	Nat	Player	Apps	Goals	Apps	Goals	Apps	Goals
Goalkeepers
1	GK	(Spain) ESP	Juan Soriano	20	0	18	0	2	0
13	GK	(Spain) ESP	Dani Barrio	26	0	24	0	1+1	0
29	GK	(Argentina) ARG	Gonzalo	0	0	0	0	0	0
Defenders
2	DF	(Venezuela) VEN	Josua Mejías	24	0	20+1	0	2+1	0
4	DF	(Spain) ESP	David Lombán	30	2	23+6	2	1	0
5	DF	(Spain) ESP	Juande	41	4	36+3	4	2	0
18	DF	(Spain) ESP	Matos	31	0	27+3	0	1	0
21	DF	(Spain) ESP	Iván Calero	18	1	15+3	1	0	0
22	DF	(Venezuela) VEN	Alexander González	18	0	11+5	0	2	0
23	DF	(Spain) ESP	Alberto Escassi	37	1	32+2	1	2+1	0
26	DF	(Spain) ESP	Ismael	19	0	19	0	0	0
28	DF	(Spain) ESP	Alejandro Benítez	11	0	8+1	0	2	0
32	DF	(Spain) ESP	Alberto Quintana	6	0	1+2	0	3	0
33	DF	(Spain) ESP	Cristo	18	0	9+9	0	0	0
47	DF	(Spain) ESP	Andrés	1	0	0+1	0	0	0
Midfielders
7	MF	(Spain) ESP	Cristian Rodríguez	38	1	22+13	1	2+1	0
8	MF	(Spain) ESP	Luis Muñoz	31	5	25+5	5	0+1	0
10	MF	(Spain) ESP	Jairo Samperio	36	1	19+14	1	2+1	0
11	MF	(Spain) ESP	Joaquín Muñoz	31	2	18+12	2	0+1	0
17	MF	(France) FRA	Yanis Rahmani	42	6	35+4	5	2+1	1
19	MF	(Spain) ESP	Jozabed	30	2	17+12	2	1	0
24	MF	(Algeria) ALG	Mohamed Benkhemassa	22	0	7+13	0	2	0
30	MF	(Spain) ESP	Ramón	29	2	21+7	2	1	0
31	MF	(Morocco) MAR	Hicham	3	0	0+2	0	1	0
35	MF	(Spain) ESP	Sergio Guerrero	3	0	1+2	0	0	0
36	MF	(Mali) MLI	Issa Fomba	1	0	0+1	0	0	0
39	MF	(Spain) ESP	David Larrubia	9	0	1+7	0	1	0
43	MF	(Spain) ESP	Juan Cruz	4	1	0+3	0	0+1	1
46	MF	(Morocco) MAR	Haitam Abaida	4	0	0+3	0	0+1	0
Forwards
12	FW	(Argentina) ARG	Pablo Chavarría	23	5	16+5	4	0+2	1
14	FW	(Serbia) SRB	Stefan Šćepović	13	3	3+10	3	0	0
20	FW	(Spain) ESP	Caye Quintana	38	5	28+7	3	0+3	2
34	FW	(Spain) ESP	Julio	13	0	2+10	0	0+1	0
45	FW	(Spain) ESP	Loren Zúñiga	3	0	0+3	0	0	0
Players who have made an appearance or had a squad number this season but have left the club
6	MF	(Morocco) MAR	Badr Boulahroud	2	0	0+2	0	0	0
9	FW	(Portugal) POR	Orlando Sá	21	1	3+15	0	3	1
