= 2022–23 Málaga CF season =

Málaga CF
2022–23 season
- President: José María Muñoz
- Head coach: Pablo Guede (until 20 September); Pepe Mel (from 21 September until 25 January); Sergio Pellicer (from 25 January)
- Stadium: La Rosaleda
- Segunda División: 20th (relegated)
- Copa del Rey: Second round
- Top goalscorer: League: Rubén Castro (10); All: Rubén Castro (10)
colours	colours	colours

The 2022–23 season was the 75th season in the history of Málaga CF and their fifth consecutive season in the second division. The club participated in Segunda División and the Copa del Rey.

== Players ==
As of 23 October 2022.

Note: Flags indicate national team as defined under FIFA eligibility rules; some limited exceptions apply. Players may hold more than one non-FIFA nationality.

No.	Pos.	Nation	Player
1	GK	ESP	Manolo Reina
2	DF	ESP	Juanfran
3	DF	ESP	Javi Jiménez
4	DF	ESP	Unai Bustinza
5	DF	ESP	Juande
6	MF	ESP	Ramón Enríquez
8	MF	ESP	Luis Muñoz (captain)
9	FW	ESP	Fran Sol (on loan from Dynamo Kyiv)
10	MF	ESP	Aleix Febas
11	MF	ESP	Álex Gallar
12	FW	ARG	Pablo Chavarría
13	GK	ESP	Rubén Yáñez
14	MF	ESP	Pablo Hervías
15	DF	GHA	Lumor Agbenyenu
16	MF	ESP	Genaro Rodríguez
18	MF	SEN	Alfred N'Diaye

No.	Pos.	Nation	Player
19	MF	ESP	Jozabed
20	DF	ARG	Esteban Burgos
21	MF	ESP	Fran Villalba (on loan from Sporting Gijón)
22	DF	ANG	Jonás Ramalho
23	MF	ESP	Alberto Escassi (vice-captain)
24	FW	ESP	Rubén Castro
26	MF	ESP	Dani Lorenzo
27	DF	ESP	Víctor Olmo
28	FW	MLI	Issa Fomba
29	FW	ESP	Loren Zúñiga
31	DF	ESP	Andrés Caro
32	DF	MLI	Moussa Diarra
34	FW	MAR	Haitam Abaida
35	DF	ESP	Diego Murillo
39	FW	ESP	Cristian Gutiérrez

=== Reserve team ===
Note: Flags indicate national team as defined under FIFA eligibility rules; some limited exceptions apply. Players may hold more than one non-FIFA nationality.

No.	Pos.	Nation	Player
37	DF	MAR	Bilal Ouacharaf

=== On loan ===
Note: Flags indicate national team as defined under FIFA eligibility rules; some limited exceptions apply. Players may hold more than one non-FIFA nationality.

No.	Pos.	Nation	Player
—	MF	ESP	David Larrubia (at Mérida until 30 June 2023)
—	FW	ESP	Kevin Villodres (at Gil Vicente until 30 June 2023)

No.	Pos.	Nation	Player
—	FW	ESP	Roberto Fernández (at Barcelona B until 30 June 2023)

== Transfers ==
=== In ===
Date	Player	From	Type	Fee	Ref
2 July 2022	(Spain) Unai Bustinza	Leganés	Transfer	Free	
15 July 2022	(Angola) Jonás Ramalho	Osasuna	Transfer	Free	
15 July 2022	(Spain) Rubén Yáñez	Getafe	Transfer	Free	

=== Out ===
Date	Player	To	Type	Fee	Ref
30 June 2022	(Spain) Dani Barrio	Burgos	Transfer	Free	
3 July 2022	(Spain) Iván Calero	Cartagena	Transfer	Free	
23 July 2022	(Spain) Kevin Villodres	(Portugal) Gil Vicente	Loan		

== Pre-season and friendlies ==
Win Draw Loss Fixtures

16 July 2022 Friendly	Hull City	3–1	Málaga
CEST (UTC+2)

23 July 2022 Friendly	Cádiz	2–0	Málaga
CEST (UTC+2)

30 July 2022 Friendly	Xerez Deportivo	1–2	Málaga
CEST (UTC+2)

6 August 2022 Friendly	Granada	1–1 (2–3 p)	Málaga
CEST (UTC+2)

== Competitions ==
=== Overall record ===
Competition	First match	Last match	Starting round	Final position	Record							
Competition	First match	Last match	Starting round	Final position	Pld	W	D	L	GF	GA	GD	Win %
Segunda División	14 August 2022	27 May 2023	Matchday 1	20th	42	10	14	18	37	44	−7	23.81
Copa del Rey	13 November 2022	22 December 2022	First round	Second round	2	0	1	1	2	3	−1	0.00
Total					44	10	15	19	39	47	−8	22.73

Source: Soccerway

=== Segunda División ===
==== League table ====
Pos	Team	Pld	W	D	L	GF	GA	GD	Pts	Qualification or relegation
18	Villarreal B	42	13	11	18	49	55	−6	50 (Note: Overall goal difference: Sporting Gijón −5, Villarreal B −6.)	Not eligible for promotion
19	Ponferradina (R)	42	9	17	16	40	53	−13	44 (Note: Ponferradina finished ahead of Málaga on head-to-head goal difference: Málaga 1–0 Ponferradina, Ponferradina 2–0 Málaga.)	Relegation to Primera Federación
20	Málaga (R)	42	10	14	18	37	44	−7	44	Relegation to Primera Federación
21	Ibiza (R)	42	7	13	22	33	66	−33	34	Relegation to Primera Federación
22	Lugo (R)	42	6	13	23	27	57	−30	31	Relegation to Primera Federación

Source: LaLiga SmartBank
Rules for classification: 1) points; 2) head-to-head points; 3) head-to-head goal difference; 4) goal difference; 5) number of goals scored
(R) Relegated
Notes:

Notes

1. Reserve teams are not eligible for promotion to the same league as the first team.

==== Results summary ====
Overall								Home						Away					
Pld	W	D	L	GF	GA	GD	Pts	W	D	L	GF	GA	GD	W	D	L	GF	GA	GD
42	10	14	18	37	44	−7	44	7	9	5	20	17	+3	3	5	13	17	27	−10

Source: LaLiga SmartBank

==== Results by round ====
Round	1	2	3	4	5	6	7	8	9	10	11	12	13	14	15	16	17	18	19	20	21	22	23	24	25	26	27	28	29	30	31	32	33	34	35	36	37	38	39	40	41	42
Ground	A	H	A	H	A	A	H	A	H	A	H	A	H	A	H	A	H	A	H	A	H	H	A	H	A	H	A	H	A	H	A	H	H	A	A	H	A	H	A	H	A	H
Result	L	L	W	L	L	L	D	D	D	L	W	L	L	L	D	D	W	L	D	D	W	D	L	D	D	L	L	W	L	L	D	D	W	L	W	W	W	D	L	W	L	D
Position	19	22	14	18	21	21	22	21	22	22	21	21	22	22	22	22	21	21	21	21	21	21	21	20	20	20	20	20	20	20	20	20	20	20	20	19	19	19	19	19	19	20

Source: LaLiga SmartBank
A = Away; H = Home; W = Win; D = Draw; L = Loss

==== Matches ====
The league fixtures were announced on 23 June 2022.

14 August 2022 1	Burgos	1–0	Málaga	Burgos
CEST (UTC+2)

22 August 2022 2	Málaga	0–4	Las Palmas	Madrid
CEST (UTC+2)				Stadium: La Rosaleda

27 August 2022 3	Mirandés	1–3	Málaga	Miranda de Ebro
CEST (UTC+2)

4 September 2022 4	Málaga	1–2	Albacete	Madrid
CEST (UTC+2)				Stadium: La Rosaleda

11 September 2022 5	Huesca	1–0	Málaga	Huesca
CEST (UTC+2)

19 September 2022 6	Tenerife	3–1	Málaga	Santa Cruz de Tenerife
CEST (UTC+2)

24 September 2022 7	Málaga	1–1	Villarreal B	Madrid
CEST (UTC+2)				Stadium: La Rosaleda

1 October 2022 8	Racing Santander	0–0	Málaga	Santander
CEST (UTC+2)

9 October 2022 9	Málaga	0–0	Andorra	Madrid
CEST (UTC+2)				Stadium: La Rosaleda

12 October 2022 10	Leganés	1–0	Málaga	Leganés
CEST (UTC+2)

13 May 2023 40	Málaga	2–0	Mirandés	Madrid
CEST (UTC+2)				Stadium: La Rosaleda

20 May 2023 41	Alavés	2–1	Ibiza	Vitoria-Gasteiz
CEST (UTC+2)

27 May 2023 42	Málaga	1–1	Ibiza	Madrid
CEST (UTC+2)				Stadium: La Rosaleda

=== Copa del Rey ===
13 November 2022 First round	Peña Deportiva	1–1 (a.e.t.) (7–8 p)	Málaga	Santa Eulària des Riu
12:00	Cristeto 33' (pen.)	Report	Sol 43'	Stadium: Municipal; Referee: Álvaro Moreno Aragón
	Penalties
	Cruz (penalty scored); Cristeto (penalty scored); Sánchez (penalty scored); Badal (penalty scored); Albert (penalty scored); Moreno (penalty scored); Cámara (penalty scored); Ripoll (penalty missed)		(penalty scored) Chavarría; (penalty scored) Sol; (penalty scored) Burgos; (penalty scored) Genaro; (penalty scored) Lorenzo; (penalty scored) Abaida; (penalty scored) N'Diaye; (penalty scored) Lumor

22 December 2022 Second round	Gimnàstic	2–1	Málaga	Tarragona
21:00	Domingo 13'; P. Fernández 81'	Report	N'Diaye 32'	Stadium: Nou Estadi; Referee: Iván Caparrós Hernández
