= Alberto Quintana (footballer, born 2001) =

Spanish footballer

Personal information
- Full name: Alberto Miguel Quintana Moreno
- Date of birth: 5 October 2001 (age 25)
- Place of birth: Villanueva del Trabuco, Spain
- Height: 1.86 m (6 ft 1 in)
- Position: Centre back

Team information
- Current team: Antequera
- Number: 22

Youth career
- 2011–2019: Málaga

Senior career*
Years	Team	Apps	(Gls)
2019–2022	Málaga B	68	(4)
2020–2022	Málaga	3	(0)
2022–2024	Valladolid B	47	(1)
2023–2024	Valladolid	6	(0)
2024–2025	Real Unión	36	(0)
2025–	Antequera	35	(0)
- * Club domestic league appearances and goals as of 10 June 2026

Alberto Miguel Quintana Moreno (born 5 October 2001) is a Spanish footballer who plays for Primera Federación club Antequera. Mainly a central defender, he can also play as a defensive midfielder.

== Club career ==
Born in Villanueva del Trabuco, Málaga, Andalusia, Quintana joined Málaga CF's youth setup in 2011 at the age of ten. On 3 June 2019, he renewed his contract with the club until 2022, being subsequently promoted to the reserves in Tercera División.

Quintana made his senior debut on 25 August 2019, starting in a 4–0 home routing of Alhaurín de la Torre CF. He scored his first senior goal on 18 October of the following year, netting the game's only in a home success over Juventud de Torremolinos CF.

Quintana made his first team debut on 1 December 2020, coming on as a late substitute for Pablo Chavarría in a 2–0 away win against CF Fuenlabrada in the Segunda División championship. On 4 July 2022, he moved to another reserve team, Real Valladolid Promesas in Segunda Federación.

On 19 July 2024, Quintana joined Primera Federación – Group 1 club Real Unión.
