= Sergio Guerrero =

Sergio Guerrero may refer to:

- Sergio Guerrero (composer)
- Sergio Guerrero (footballer)
