= Aleix Febas =

Spanish footballer (born 1996)

Personal information
- Full name: Aleix Febas Pérez
- Date of birth: 2 February 1996 (age 30)
- Place of birth: Lleida, Spain
- Height: 1.72 m (5 ft 8 in)
- Position: Midfielder

Team information
- Current team: Celta
- Number: 14

Youth career
- 2001–2004: EFAC Almacelles
- 2004–2007: Baix Segrià
- 2007–2009: Lleida
- 2009–2014: Real Madrid

Senior career*
Years	Team	Apps	(Gls)
2014–2015	Real Madrid C	27	(2)
2015–2019	Real Madrid B	69	(8)
2017–2018	→ Zaragoza (loan)	39	(2)
2018–2019	→ Albacete (loan)	38	(3)
2019–2022	Mallorca	67	(0)
2022	→ Málaga (loan)	19	(2)
2022–2023	Málaga	41	(0)
2023–2026	Elche	112	(3)
2026–	Celta	0	(0)

International career^{‡}
2012	Spain U16	4	(0)
2012–2013	Spain U17	8	(0)
2017	Spain U21	0	(0)
- * Club domestic league appearances and goals as of 27 May 2026 ‡ National team caps and goals as of 21 March 2013

Aleix Febas Pérez (Spanish pronunciation: [aˈleʃ ˈfeβas ˈpeɾeθ]; (Note: His first name is Catalan, and is pronounced [əˈleʃ].) born 2 February 1996) is a Spanish professional footballer who plays as a central midfielder for La Liga club Celta.

== Club career ==
Born in Lleida, Catalonia, Febas joined Real Madrid's youth setup in 2009 at the age of 13, from UE Lleida. He made his senior debut with the C-team on 7 September 2014 by starting in a 2–3 Tercera División home loss against Fútbol Alcobendas Sport, and scored his first goal on 21 December in a home loss to UD San Sebastián de los Reyes for the same scoreline.

On 5 July 2015, Febas was promoted to the reserves in Segunda División B by manager Zinedine Zidane. He made his debut for the B-side on 22 August, starting in a 5–1 home routing of CD Ebro.

On 30 January 2016 Febas scored his first senior goal for Castilla, netting the first in a 2–1 away win against Real Sociedad B. He also scored doubles against SD Amorebieta (4–1 away success) and Sestao River Club (3–1 home win) in February 2016, and finished the season with nine goals as his side missed out promotion in the play-offs.

On 8 November 2016, after still being a regular starter under Santiago Solari, Febas renewed his contract. The following 11 July, he was loaned to Segunda División club Real Zaragoza, for one year.

Febas made his professional debut on 18 August 2017, starting in a 0–1 away loss against CD Tenerife. On 10 July of the following year, he was loaned to Albacete Balompié for one year.

On 12 July 2019, Febas agreed to a four-year contract with RCD Mallorca, newly promoted to La Liga. On 7 January 2022, he was loaned to Málaga CF in the second division for the remainder of the campaign.

On 4 July 2022, Febas signed a permanent three-year contract with Málaga. On 30 June of the following year, after the club's relegation, he left after activating an exit clause on his contract, and signed a three-year deal with Elche CF also in the second tier six days later.

On 1 June 2026, Febas agreed to a three-year contract with RC Celta de Vigo in the top tier.

== International career ==
Febas was called up to the Spain under-21 preliminary squad by coach Albert Celades in October 2017.

== Personal life ==
Febas' younger brother Joel is also a footballer. A winger, he too played youth football in Lleida, but for Lleida Esportiu.

== Club statistics ==
As of match played 27 February 2026

Appearances and goals by club, season and competition
Club	Season	League			National cup		Other		Total	
Club	Season	Division	Apps	Goals	Apps	Goals	Apps	Goals	Apps	Goals
Real Madrid C	2014–15	Tercera División	27	2	—		—		27	2
Real Madrid Castilla	2015–16	Segunda División B	33	5	—		4 (Note: Appearances in Segunda División B playoffs)	1	37	6
Real Madrid Castilla	2016–17	Segunda División B	36	3	—		—		36	3
Real Madrid Castilla	Total		69	8	—		4	1	73	9
Real Zaragoza (loan)	2017–18	Segunda División	39	2	2	0	2 (Note: Appearances in Segunda División promotion play-offs)	0	43	2
Albacete (loan)	2018–19	Segunda División	38	3	0	0	2 (Note: Appearances in Segunda División promotion play-offs)	0	40	3
Mallorca	2019–20	La Liga	29	0	3	2	—		32	2
Mallorca	2020–21	Segunda División	34	0	2	0	—		36	0
Mallorca	2021–22	La Liga	4	0	2	0	—		6	0
Mallorca	Total		67	0	7	2	—		74	2
Málaga (loan)	2021–22	Segunda División	19	2	—		—		19	2
Málaga	2022–23	Segunda División	41	0	2	0	—		43	0
Elche	2023–24	Segunda División	39	0	2	1	—		41	1
Elche	2024–25	Segunda División	37	1	2	0	—		39	1
Elche	2025–26	La Liga	24	2	1	0	—		25	2
Elche	Total		100	3	5	1	—		105	4
Career total			400	20	16	3	8	1	424	24
