= Mathieu Peybernes =

French footballer (born 1990)

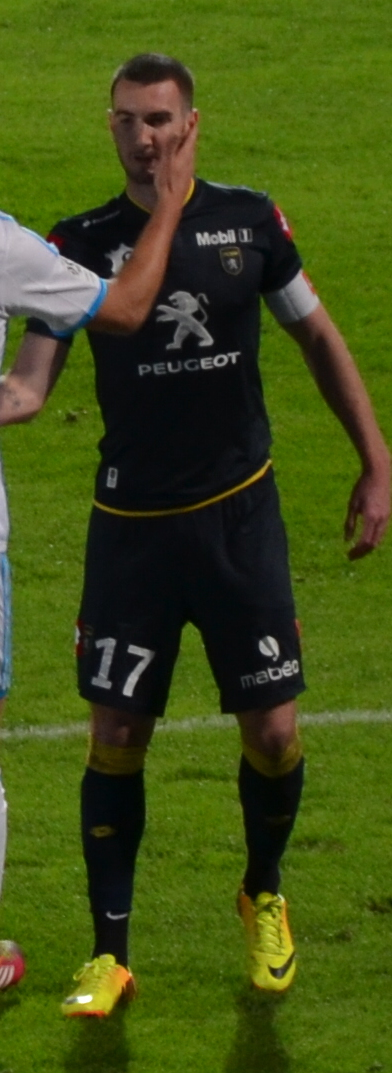

Personal information
- Full name: Mathieu Philippe Peybernes
- Date of birth: 21 October 1990 (age 36)
- Place of birth: Toulouse, France
- Height: 1.87 m (6 ft 2 in)
- Position: Centre-back

Team information
- Current team: Sochaux
- Number: 14

Youth career
- 1996–2006: Colomiers
- 2002–2004: INF Castelmaurou
- 2006–2010: Sochaux

Senior career*
Years	Team	Apps	(Gls)
2010–2014	Sochaux	75	(1)
2014–2017	Bastia	74	(0)
2017–2019	Lorient	18	(0)
2017–2018	→ Göztepe (loan)	9	(0)
2018	→ Eupen (loan)	5	(0)
2018–2019	→ Sporting Gijón (loan)	26	(1)
2019–2021	Almería	4	(0)
2019–2020	→ Lugo (loan)	30	(1)
2021	→ Zaragoza (loan)	14	(1)
2021–2022	Málaga	34	(2)
2022–2024	Apollon Limassol	49	(0)
2024–	Sochaux	57	(3)

International career^{‡}
2007–2008	France U18	2	(0)
2008–2009	France U19	5	(0)
2011	France U21	2	(0)
- * Club domestic league appearances and goals as of 23 June 2026 ‡ National team caps and goals as of 5 June 2011

Mathieu Philippe Peybernes (born 21 October 1990) is a French professional footballer who plays as a centre-back for Ligue 2 club Sochaux. He was a France youth international having earned caps with the under-18 and under-19 teams.

== Career ==
Peybernes was born in Toulouse, Haute-Garonne. He made his professional debut on 2 May 2010 in a league match against Rennes.

In summer 2014, Peybernes left his first professional club Sochaux for SC Bastia, signing a three-year contract. With this club he will play a total of 34 games all competition included and especially playing during the Final of the Coupe de la Ligue against Paris-Saint-Germain lost by 0–4.

During the next winter market he joined FC Lorient. After the club was relegated to Ligue 2, he was moved to Turkish club of Göztepe SK on loan. In January, however, his loan was terminated and he moved to KAS Eupen also in a temporary deal.

On 2 August 2018, Peybernes moved to Spain after agreeing to a one-year loan deal with Segunda División side Sporting de Gijón. On 24 July of the following year, he signed a permanent three-year contract with fellow league team UD Almería, but was loaned to CD Lugo for the season on 2 September, along with teammate Yanis Rahmani.

Peybernes returned to the Rojiblancos for the 2020–21 campaign, but moved out on loan to Real Zaragoza on 15 January 2021, after being rarely used. He terminated his contract with Almería on 31 July, and signed a two-year deal with fellow second division side Málaga CF on 2 August. He rescinded his contract one year later.

== Career statistics ==
As of match played 21 May 2024

Appearances and goals by club, season and competition
Club	Season	League			National Cup		League Cup		Continental		Other		Total	
Club	Season	Division	Apps	Goals	Apps	Goals	Apps	Goals	Apps	Goals	Apps	Goals	Apps	Goals
Sochaux	2009–10	Ligue 1	1	0	0	0	0	0	—		—		1	0
Sochaux	2010–11	Ligue 1	8	0	0	0	0	0	—		—		8	0
Sochaux	2011–12	Ligue 1	26	1	1	0	1	0	1 (Note: Appearance in the Europa League)	0	—		29	1
Sochaux	2012–13	Ligue 1	25	0	1	0	0	0	—		—		26	0
Sochaux	2013–14	Ligue 1	15	0	2	0	2	0	—		—		19	0
Sochaux	Total		75	1	4	0	3	0	1	0	—		83	1
Bastia	2014–15	Ligue 1	30	0	2	0	2	0	—		—		34	0
Bastia	2015–16	Ligue 1	25	0	1	0	1	0	—		—		27	0
Bastia	2016–17	Ligue 1	19	0	1	0	1	0	—		—		21	0
Bastia	Total		74	0	4	0	4	0	—		—		82	0
Lorient	2016–17	Ligue 1	20	0	—		—		—		—		20	0
Göztepe (loan)	2017–18	Süper Lig	9	0	0	0	—		—		—		9	0
Eupen (loan)	2017–18	First Division A	10	0	—		—		—		—		10	0
Sporting Gijón (loan)	2018–19	Segunda División	26	1	3	0	—		—		—		29	1
Lugo (loan)	2019–20	Segunda División	30	1	0	0	—		—		—		30	1
Almería	2020–21	Segunda División	4	0	2	0	—		—		—		6	0
Zaragoza (loan)	2020–21	Segunda División	14	1	—		—		—		—		14	1
Málaga	2021–22	Segunda División	34	2	2	0	—		—		—		36	2
Apollon Limassol	2022–23	Cypriot First Division	21	0	1	0	—		6	0	1	0	29	0
Apollon Limassol	2023–24	Cypriot First Division	27	0	1	0	—		—		—		28	0
Apollon Limassol	Total		48	0	2	0	—		6	0	1	0	57	0
Career total			344	6	17	0	7	0	7	0	1	0	376	6
