= Estadio Los Manantiales =

Stadium in the town of Alhaurín de la Torre, Málaga, Spain

- Location: Alhaurín el Grande; Alhaurín de la Torre
- Owner: Alhaurín de la Torre CF
- Capacity: 2,500
- Surface: Artificial Grass
- Field size: 100m×60m

Construction
- Opened: 2002

Tenant
- Alhaurín de la Torre CF

Estadio Los Manantiales is a stadium in the town of Alhaurín de la Torre, Málaga, Spain, owned and operated by Alhaurín de la Torre CF.

This stadium is made of artificial grass and previously had athletics tracks for other sports. The facilities have three changing rooms, several toilets, two bars, various premises, offices, a room and a press box.
