= Jairo Samperio =

Spanish footballer (born 1993)

Jairo
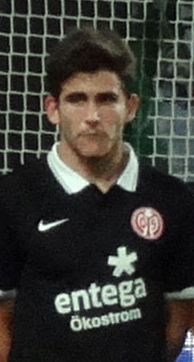
- Jairo with Mainz 05 in 2014

Personal information
- Full name: Jairo Samperio Bustara
- Date of birth: 11 July 1993 (age 33)
- Place of birth: Cabezón de la Sal, Spain
- Height: 1.73 m (5 ft 8 in)
- Position: Winger

Youth career
- Textil Escudo
- 2006–2011: Racing Santander

Senior career*
Years	Team	Apps	(Gls)
2011	Racing B	4	(3)
2011–2013	Racing Santander	63	(12)
2013–2014	Sevilla	25	(4)
2014–2017	Mainz 05	72	(11)
2018	Las Palmas	11	(0)
2018–2020	Hamburger SV	16	(1)
2020–2022	Málaga	52	(1)
2022–2023	Honvéd	17	(4)
2024	Mezőkövesd	6	(0)
2025	Sestao River	10	(0)
2025–2026	NorthEast United	9	(3)

International career
2013	Spain U20	4	(2)
2013	Spain U21	2	(0)
- * Club domestic league appearances and goals as of 14:16, 19 June 2026 (UTC)

Jairo Samperio Bustara (born 11 July 1993), known simply as Jairo, is a Spanish professional footballer who plays as a right winger.

== Club career ==
=== Racing Santander ===
Born in Cabezón de la Sal, Cantabria, Jairo was a product of local Racing de Santander's youth ranks. He was promoted to the first team immediately after finishing his development in 2011, by manager Héctor Cúper. He made his first-team and La Liga debut on 27 August, playing the last twelve minutes in a 4–3 away defeat against Valencia CF after coming on as a substitute for Manuel Arana.

On 21 September 2011, the 18-year-old Jairo started his first official game for Racing, in a 0–0 home draw with Real Madrid. On 25 October, he scored his first league goal in a 2–2 draw at Sevilla FC, and went on to start in 14 of his league appearances in his first season (1,248 minutes of action), which ended in relegation.

=== Sevilla ===
On 21 June 2013, after again dropping down a level with Racing, Jairo returned to the top division by signing a five-year contract with Sevilla, for a rumoured €2.5 million. He made his competitive debut for the club on 1 August, replacing José Antonio Reyes in the 19th minute of a 3–0 win over FK Mladost Podgorica in the third qualifying round of the UEFA Europa League.

=== Mainz 05 ===
Jairo joined Bundesliga side 1. FSV Mainz 05 on 29 August 2014, on a four-year deal; the transfer fee remained undisclosed, but was believed to be in the region of €2 million. He finished his first season with 22 games and two goals, helping to a final 11th position.

On 5 December 2015, Jairo scored a brace to help to a 3–1 away win against Hamburger SV. On 2 March of the following year, he put the visiting team ahead at FC Bayern Munich after a 26th-minute cross from Giulio Donati, in an eventual 2–1 victory that handed the hosts their first home defeat of the campaign.

=== Las Palmas ===
Free agent Jairo returned to Spain on 1 January 2018, signing with top-flight strugglers UD Las Palmas until 30 June. His league debut took place 12 days later, when he started in a 6–0 away loss to Girona FC.

=== Hamburger SV ===
Jairo moved back to Germany in the summer of 2018, with 2. Bundesliga club Hamburger SV. He played just 19 matches in all competitions during his two-year spell at the Volksparkstadion – mainly due to a serious knee injury– scoring in injury time of the 4–2 defeat of Karlsruher SC in the domestic league.

=== Later career ===
On 29 September 2020, Jairo agreed to a two-year contract with second-tier Málaga CF. He went abroad again in August 2022, on a one-year deal at Budapest Honvéd FC in the Hungarian Nemzeti Bajnokság I.

Jairo remained in the country's top division on 24 January 2024, signing for Mezőkövesdi SE. He returned to Spain one year later, joining Primera Federación side Sestao River Club on a short-term deal.

On 4 July 2025, Jairo moved to the Indian Super League with NorthEast United FC.

== Career statistics ==
As of match played 11 October 2023

Appearances and goals by club, season and competition
Club	Season	League			National Cup		Other		Total	
Club	Season	Division	Apps	Goals	Apps	Goals	Apps	Goals	Apps	Goals
Racing Santander	2011–12	La Liga	25	2	2	0	—		27	2
Racing Santander	2012–13	Segunda División	38	10	2	0	—		40	10
Racing Santander	Total		63	12	4	0	0	0	67	12
Sevilla	2013–14	La Liga	25	4	2	1	9 (Note: Appearances in UEFA Europa League)	1	36	6
Mainz 05	2014–15	Bundesliga	22	2	0	0	—		22	2
Mainz 05	2015–16	Bundesliga	31	7	2	1	—		33	8
Mainz 05	2016–17	Bundesliga	17	2	1	0	4	0	22	2
Mainz 05	2017–18	Bundesliga	2	0	0	0	—		2	0
Mainz 05	Total		72	11	3	1	4	0	79	12
Las Palmas	2017–18	La Liga	11	0	1	0	—		12	0
Hamburger SV	2018–19	2. Bundesliga	2	0	1	0	—		3	0
Hamburger SV	2019–20	2. Bundesliga	14	1	2	0	—		16	1
Hamburger SV	Total		16	1	3	0	0	0	19	1
Málaga	2020–21	Segunda División	33	1	3	0	—		36	1
Málaga	2021–22	Segunda División	19	0	2	0	—		21	0
Málaga	Total		52	1	5	0	0	0	57	1
Honvéd	2022–23	Nemzeti Bajnokság I	17	4	1	0	—		18	4
Career total			256	33	19	2	13	1	288	36

== Honours ==
Sevilla

- UEFA Europa League: 2013–14
- UEFA Super Cup runner-up: 2014
