= Ramón Enríquez =

Spanish footballer

Ramón
Personal information
- Full name: Ramón Enríquez Rodríguez
- Date of birth: 19 April 2001 (age 25)
- Place of birth: Órgiva, Spain
- Height: 1.73 m (5 ft 8 in)
- Position: Attacking midfielder

Team information
- Current team: Málaga
- Number: 6

Youth career
- 2009–2013: Ciudad de Granada
- 2013–2019: Málaga

Senior career*
Years	Team	Apps	(Gls)
2019–2020	Málaga B	26	(0)
2019–	Málaga	103	(3)

International career
2018	Spain U17	2	(0)
2018	Spain U18	2	(1)
2019–2020	Spain U19	4	(0)
- * Club domestic league appearances and goals as of 19 August 2026

Ramón Enríquez Rodríguez (born 19 April 2001), simply known as Ramón, is a Spanish footballer who plays for Málaga CF as an attacking midfielder.

== Club career ==
Ramón was born in Órgiva, Granada, Andalusia, and joined Málaga CF's youth setup in 2013, from CD Ciudad de Granada. He made his senior debut with the reserves on 7 April 2019, coming on as a late substitute for Juan Cruz in a 3–0 Segunda División B home defeat of Sevilla Atlético.

On 17 April 2019, Ramón renewed his contract until 2022. He made his first team debut on 17 August, coming on as a late substitute for fellow youth graduate Hugo Vallejo in a 1–0 away win against Racing de Santander.

Ramón scored his first professional goal on 19 September 2020, netting the winner in a 1–0 away success over CD Castellón. On 14 December, already established as a regular starter, he renewed his contract until 2024.

In April 2023, Ramón suffered an injury which sidelined him for the remainder of the season; Málaga eventually suffered relegation. He also spent most of the 2023–24 campaign sidelined, where he contributed with 141 minutes in five matches as the club returned to the second division.

On 17 July 2024, Ramón renewed his link with the Albicelestes until 2026. In March 2025, however, he suffered a knee injury which kept him sidelined for more than a year; in that period, he also extended his contract until 2027 on 3 July 2025.

Ramón continued to struggle with injuries during the 2025–26 campaign, but still featured in ten matches overall as Málaga achieved promotion to La Liga. He made his debut in the category on 19 August 2026, replacing Einar Galilea in a 2–0 away loss to Atlético Madrid.

== Career statistics ==
As of match played 3 June 2026

Appearances and goals by club, season and competition
Club	Season	League			National Cup		Other		Total	
Club	Season	Division	Apps	Goals	Apps	Goals	Apps	Goals	Apps	Goals
Málaga B	2018–19	Segunda División B	4	0	—		—		4	0
Málaga B	2019–20	Tercera División	22	0	—		—		22	0
Málaga B	Total		26	0	—		—		26	0
Málaga	2019–20	Segunda División	4	0	0	0	—		4	0
Málaga	2020–21	Segunda División	28	2	1	0	—		29	2
Málaga	2021–22	Segunda División	26	1	0	0	—		26	1
Málaga	2022–23	Segunda División	20	0	1	0	—		21	0
Málaga	2023–24	Primera Federación	5	0	0	0	0 (Note: Appearances in promotion playoffs)	0	5	0
Málaga	2024–25	Segunda División	11	0	0	0	—		11	0
Málaga	2025–26	Segunda División	8	0	2	0	0	0	10	0
Málaga	Total		102	3	4	0	0	0	106	3
Career total			128	3	4	0	0	0	131	3
