= Villanueva del Trabuco =

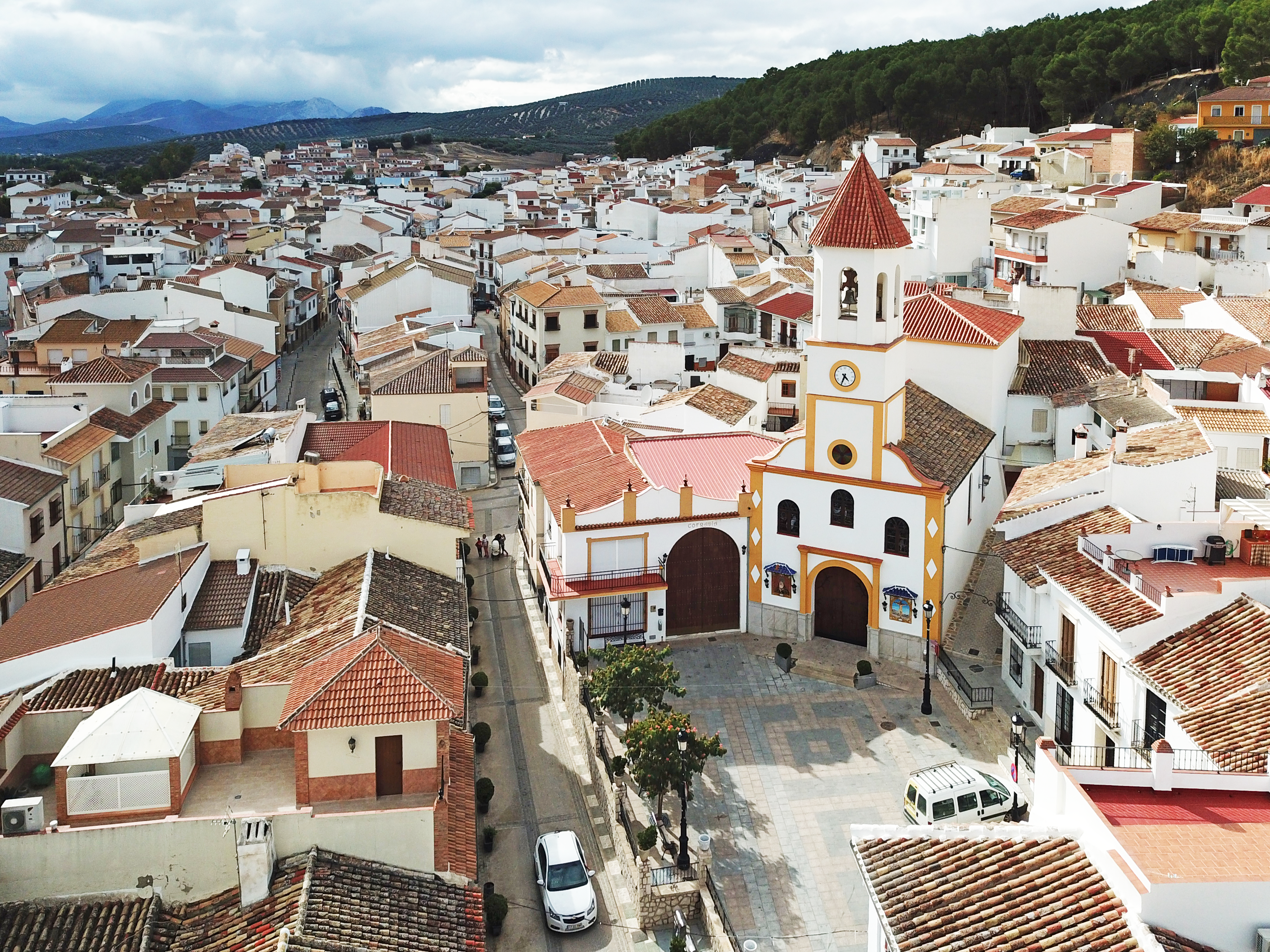
- Overview of Villanueva del Trabuco from near the church square

- Flag Coat of arms

- Location in Spain.
- Coordinates: 37°01′43″N 4°20′17″W
- Sovereign state: Spain
- Autonomous community: Andalusia
- Province: Málaga

Area
  - Total: 59.17 km^{2} (22.85 sq mi)
- Elevation: 682 m (2,238 ft)

Population (2025-01-01)
  - Total: 5,521
  - Density: 93.31/km^{2} (241.7/sq mi)
- Time zone: UTC+1 (CET)
  - Summer (DST): UTC+2 (CEST)
- Website: www.villanuevadeltrabuco.com

Villanueva del Trabuco is a town and municipality in the province of Málaga, part of the autonomous community of Andalusia in southern Spain. It is situated in the northeast of the province. Villanueva del Trabuco is located in the comarca of Nororma. The municipality is situated approximately 45 kilometres from the provincial capital of Málaga and 34 from Antequera. It has a population of approximately 5,000 residents. The natives are called Trabuqueños. Local legend has it that the town is named after a type of early gun called a Trabuco, which was in common usage in the area many years ago.

== See also ==
- List of municipalities in Málaga
