= Iván Calero =

Spanish footballer (born 1995)

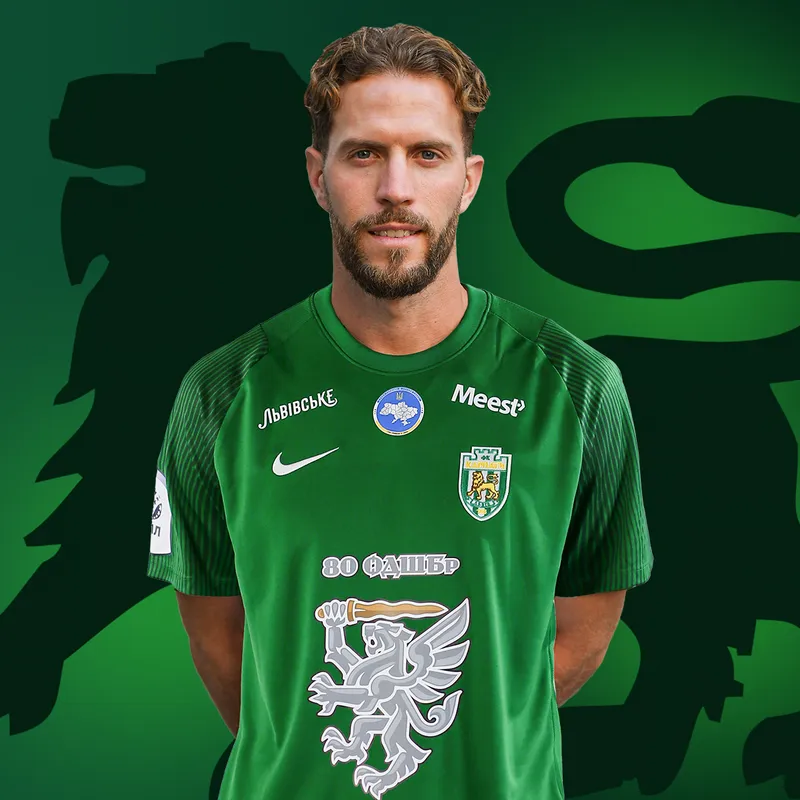

Personal information
- Full name: Iván Calero Ruiz
- Date of birth: 21 April 1995 (age 31)
- Place of birth: Parla, Spain
- Height: 1.74 m (5 ft 9 in)
- Positions: Right-back; right winger

Team information
- Current team: Cultural Leonesa
- Number: 17

Youth career
- Atlético Madrid
- 2008–2010: Real Madrid
- 2010–2012: Atlético Madrid

Senior career*
Years	Team	Apps	(Gls)
2011–2013	Atlético Madrid C	33	(7)
2012–2014	Atlético Madrid B	29	(4)
2014–2016	Derby County	2	(0)
2015	→ Burton Albion (loan)	6	(0)
2016–2017	Sparta Rotterdam	8	(2)
2016–2017	Jong Sparta	10	(4)
2017–2019	Elche	17	(0)
2018–2019	→ Salamanca (loan)	34	(7)
2019–2020	Numancia	37	(2)
2020–2022	Málaga	20	(1)
2022	→ Alcorcón (loan)	16	(1)
2022–2024	Cartagena	76	(2)
2024–2025	Zaragoza	34	(0)
2025–	Cultural Leonesa	33	(3)

International career
2011	Spain U16	5	(3)
2012	Spain U17	6	(3)
2013	Spain U18	2	(1)
2013–2014	Spain U19	10	(4)
- * Club domestic league appearances and goals as of 9 June 2026

Iván Calero Ruiz (born 21 April 1995) is a Spanish professional footballer who plays as either a right-back or a right winger for Cultural y Deportiva Leonesa.

He began his career at Atlético Madrid, playing in its third and second teams before joining Derby County in 2014. He had two years at the English club, and spent a short loan at Burton Albion before having a one-year spell at Dutch side Sparta Rotterdam and subsequently returning to Spain, where he played for Elche and Salamanca before establishing himself in the Segunda División. Calero has represented Spain internationally, up to under-19 level.

== Club career ==
=== Atlético Madrid ===
Born in Parla in the Community of Madrid, Calero graduated from local Atlético Madrid's youth system, and made his senior debut with the C-team in the 2011–12 campaign, in Tercera División. He appeared regularly in the following season, also making his senior debut with the reserves in Segunda División B on 9 September 2012, replacing Pedro Martín after 60 minutes of a 3–1 loss at Leganés.

On 20 February 2013, Calero was called up to the main squad by manager Diego Simeone for a UEFA Europa League match against Rubin Kazan. However, he remained unused in the eventual 1–0 away win.

On 19 May 2013, in only his second match with the reserves, Calero scored his first senior goal, netting the last of a 4–1 win at Rayo Vallecano B. He was definitely promoted to the B-team in the 2013 summer, and scored four goals in 29 matches in 2013–14.

=== Derby County ===
In July 2014, Calero went to Championship club Derby County, and signed a two-year deal with the Rams on 18 July. Manager Steve McClaren said: "He's a young player with excellent pedigree. We are really pleased that he sees his future at Derby County".

Calero played his first match as a professional on 26 August, replacing Simon Dawkins for the last 20 minutes of a League Cup victory over Charlton Athletic at Pride Park, netting the game's only goal in the 87th minute. On 14 September he played in the league for the first time, replacing John Eustace for the final 13 minutes of a 1–1 draw away to rivals Nottingham Forest.

After spending time training there, Calero was loaned to nearby League Two club Burton Albion for a month on 2 February 2015. He was signed by Jimmy Floyd Hasselbaink, whom he had watched play for Atlético Madrid in 1999–2000, and said "He was a big hero because of his goals. He's one of the reasons I came...I can learn many things from him. It's a great opportunity for my development and to get some experience". Five days after signing he made his debut, replacing Adam McGurk for the last two minutes of a 3–1 win at Cheltenham Town. On 10 February he made his first start in his first match at the Pirelli Stadium, playing the first 64 minutes of a goalless draw against Wimbledon before being replaced by Abdenasser El Khayati.

After Calero returned to Derby, Burton were promoted to League One at the end of the season as champions, while Derby missed out on the play-offs with a 3–0 home defeat to Reading on the last day.

After appearing on the bench only once in the 2015–16 season, Calero was one of five Derby youngsters released at the end of the campaign.

=== Sparta Rotterdam ===
On 2 June 2016, Calero signed a two-year contract with Dutch club Sparta Rotterdam.

=== Elche ===
On 8 July 2017, Calero signed for Elche in the third division. On 27 July of the following year, after achieving promotion to Segunda División, he was loaned to fellow third division side Salamanca for one year.

=== Numancia and Málaga ===
On 8 July 2019, Calero joined Numancia on a two-year deal after terminating his contract with Elche. On 28 August of the following year, after suffering relegation, he signed a three-year contract with Málaga.

In December 2020, Calero suffered a serious knee injury, only returning to action the following September. On 15 January 2022, he moved to fellow second division side Alcorcón on loan for the remainder of the season.

=== Cartagena ===
On 3 July 2022, free agent Calero signed a three-year deal with Cartagena, still in the second tier. He was a regular starter for the side, being managed by his father during most of the 2023–24 campaign.

=== Zaragoza and Cultural Leonesa ===
On 16 July 2024, Calero agreed to a three-year contract with Real Zaragoza also in division two. On 31 August 2025, he moved to fellow league team Cultural Leonesa.

== International career ==
On 23 November 2010, Calero was called up to the Spain under-16s. He subsequently represented the under-17, under-18 and under-19 levels.

== Personal life ==
Calero's father Julián had a lengthy career in coaching and management, including as assistant to Fernando Hierro for the Spain national team at the 2018 FIFA World Cup.

== Career statistics ==
As of 16 June 2023

Appearances and goals by club, season and competition
Club	Season	League			National cup		Europe		Other		Total	
Club	Season	Division	Apps	Goals	Apps	Goals	Apps	Goals	Apps	Goals	Apps	Goals
Atlético Madrid C	2011–12	Tercera División	1	0	0	0	0	0	0	0	1	0
Atlético Madrid C	2012–13	Tercera División	32	7	0	0	0	0	0	0	32	7
Atlético Madrid C	Total		33	7	0	0	0	0	0	0	33	7
Atlético Madrid B	2012–13	Segunda División B	2	1	0	0	0	0	0	0	2	1
Atlético Madrid B	2013–14	Segunda División B	27	3	0	0	0	0	0	0	27	3
Atlético Madrid B	Total		29	4	0	0	0	0	0	0	29	4
Derby County	2014–15	Championship	2	0	1	1	0	0	0	0	3	1
Burton Albion (loan)	2014–15	League Two	6	0	0	0	0	0	0	0	6	0
Sparta Rotterdam	2016–17	Eredivisie	8	2	4	0	0	0	0	0	12	2
Jong Sparta Rotterdam	2016–17	Tweede Divisie	10	4	0	0	0	0	0	0	10	4
Elche	2017–18	Segunda División B	17	0	3	0	0	0	0	0	20	0
Salamanca (loan)	2018–19	Segunda División B	34	7	0	0	0	0	0	0	34	7
Numancia	2019–20	Segunda División	37	2	0	0	0	0	0	0	37	2
Málaga	2020–21	Segunda División	18	1	0	0	0	0	0	0	18	1
Málaga	2021–22	Segunda División	2	0	2	0	0	0	0	0	4	0
Málaga	Total		20	1	2	0	0	0	0	0	22	1
Alcorcón (loan)	2021–22	Segunda División	16	1	0	0	0	0	0	0	16	1
Cartagena	2022–23	Segunda División	39	1	2	0	0	0	0	0	41	1
Career total			251	29	12	1	0	0	0	0	263	30
