= Cristian Rodríguez (footballer, born 1996) =

Spanish footballer

Personal information
- Full name: Cristian Rodríguez Pérez
- Date of birth: 15 March 1996 (age 30)
- Place of birth: Jerez de la Frontera, Spain
- Height: 1.75 m (5 ft 9 in)
- Position: Midfielder

Team information
- Current team: Juventud Torremolinos

Youth career
- Sanluqueño

Senior career*
Years	Team	Apps	(Gls)
2014–2015	Sanluqueño B	3	(1)
2014–2016	Sanluqueño	55	(3)
2016–2019	Atlético Madrid B	69	(5)
2019–2021	Extremadura	26	(3)
2020–2021	→ Málaga (loan)	35	(1)
2021–2022	Ponferradina	28	(1)
2022–2024	Castellón	48	(4)
2024–2026	Ceuta	60	(7)
2026–	Juventud Torremolinos	0	(0)
- * Club domestic league appearances and goals as of 9 June 2026

Cristian Rodríguez Pérez (born 15 March 1996) is a Spanish professional footballer who plays as a central midfielder for Juventud de Torremolinos CF.

== Club career ==
Born in Jerez de la Frontera, Cádiz, Andalusia, Rodríguez was a Sanluqueño B youth graduate. He first appeared with the reserves in the 2013–14 season in the regional leagues, and made his first team debut on 15 March 2014 by playing the last 12 minutes of a 2–1 Segunda División B home win against La Roda.

On 25 August 2016, after already establishing himself as a starter for the Verdiblancos, Rodríguez joined Atlético Madrid and was assigned to the B-team in the Tercera División. On 28 March 2018, after achieving promotion to the third division in 2016–17, he renewed his contract until 2020.

On 19 July 2019, Rodríguez agreed to a four-year deal with Extremadura in the Segunda División. He made his professional debut on 1 October, starting and scoring the second in a 2–0 home win against Elche.

On 18 August 2020, after suffering relegation, Rodríguez moved to fellow second division side Málaga on loan for the season. On 30 August of the following year, he signed a permanent deal with Ponferradina in the same category.

In the following years, Rodríguez represented Castellón, Ceuta and Juventud Torremolinos in the Primera Federación, helping the first two to second division promotions.
