= Cristo Romero =

Spanish footballer

Personal information
- Full name: Cristo Jesús Romero Gómez
- Date of birth: 30 April 2000 (age 26)
- Place of birth: Algeciras, Spain
- Height: 1.73 m (5 ft 8 in)
- Position: Left back

Team information
- Current team: Murcia
- Number: 3

Youth career
- 2012–2019: Málaga

Senior career*
Years	Team	Apps	(Gls)
2019–2020	Málaga B	11	(0)
2019–2022	Málaga	23	(0)
2021–2022	→ Real Sociedad B (loan)	16	(0)
2021–2022	→ Real Sociedad (loan)	1	(0)
2022–2024	Intercity	59	(2)
2024–2025	Villarreal B	28	(0)
2025–	Murcia	35	(1)
- * Club domestic league appearances and goals as of 10 June 2026

Cristo Jesús Romero Gómez (born 30 April 2000) is a Spanish footballer who plays as a left back for Murcia.

== Club career ==
Romero was born in Algeciras, Cádiz, Andalusia, and represented Málaga CF as a youth. He made his senior debut with the reserves on 25 August 2019, starting in a 4–0 Tercera División away routing of Alhaurín de la Torre CF.

Romero made his first team debut on 12 October 2019, starting in a 1–2 home loss against Cádiz CF in the Segunda División championship. The following 17 August, he renewed his contract until 2023.

On 8 August 2021, Romero moved to Real Sociedad on a one-year loan deal, with a buyout clause. Initially assigned to the reserves also in the second division, he made his first team debut for the Txuri-urdin on 16 September by coming on as a late substitute for Joseba Zaldúa in a 2–2 away draw against PSV Eindhoven, for the season's UEFA Europa League.

On 25 July 2022, Romero signed a two-year contract with Primera Federación side CF Intercity. On 16 July 2024, he moved to fellow league team Villarreal CF B on a one-year deal. On 5 July 2025, he joined Murcia, also in Primera Federación.
