= Yanis Rahmani =

French footballer (born 1995)

Personal information
- Full name: Yanis Moloud Rahmani Cordeiro
- Date of birth: 13 May 1995 (age 31)
- Place of birth: Champigny-sur-Marne, France
- Height: 1.78 m (5 ft 10 in)
- Position: Winger

Team information
- Current team: Sabadell

Youth career
- Sestao
- San Pedro
- 2005–2014: Athletic Bilbao

Senior career*
Years	Team	Apps	(Gls)
2012–2017	Basconia	23	(1)
2014–2015	→ Sestao (loan)	32	(0)
2015–2016	→ Tudelano (loan)	3	(0)
2016	→ Leioa (loan)	16	(2)
2016–2017	→ Sestao (loan)	37	(2)
2017–2019	Mirandés	65	(18)
2019–2021	Almería	2	(0)
2019–2020	→ Lugo (loan)	27	(1)
2020–2021	→ Málaga (loan)	39	(5)
2021–2024	Eibar	74	(7)
2024	→ Tenerife (loan)	14	(0)
2024–2025	Málaga	23	(0)
2026	Cartagena	17	(6)
2026–	Sabadell	10	(0)
- * Club domestic league appearances and goals as of 9 November 2026

Yanis Moloud Rahmani Cordeiro (born 13 May 1995) is a French footballer who plays as a left winger for Segunda División club CE Sabadell FC.

== Career ==
Born in Champigny-sur-Marne to an Algerian father and a Portuguese mother, Rahmani moved to Sestao at the age of eight and joined Athletic Bilbao's youth setup in 2005, aged ten. He made his senior debut with the farm team in the 2012–13 season, in Tercera División.

In August 2014, after finishing his formation, Rahmani was loaned to Segunda División B side Sestao River Club, for one year. He subsequently served further loan stints at CD Tudelano, SD Leioa and again back to Sestao before leaving Athletic when his contract expired in 2017.

On 26 June 2017, Rahmani signed a two-year contract with CD Mirandés, still in the third division. On 3 July 2019, he agreed to a two-year deal with UD Almería in Segunda División.

Rahmani made his professional debut on 17 August 2019, coming on as a late substitute for Gaspar in a 3–0 home defeat of Albacete Balompié. On 2 September, however, he and teammate Mathieu Peybernes were loaned to CD Lugo for the season.

Rahmani scored his first professional goal on 9 February 2020, netting the opener in a 2–2 home draw against Elche CF. On 1 September, he moved to fellow league team Málaga CF on loan for the season.

On 30 July 2021, Rahmani agreed to a four-year contract with SD Eibar, also in the second division. On 14 January 2024, he was loaned to fellow league team CD Tenerife for the remainder of the season.

On 28 August 2024, Rahmani terminated his link with the Armeros, and returned to Málaga on a one-year deal the following day. On 20 January 2026, after six months without a club, he signed with FC Cartagena in Primera Federación.

On 8 July 2026, Rahmani was announced at CE Sabadell FC, newly-promoted to division two, on a one-year contract.

== Career statistics ==
As of match played on 11 March 2023

Club statistics
Club	Season	League			National Cup		Other		Total	
Club	Season	Division	Apps	Goals	Apps	Goals	Apps	Goals	Apps	Goals
Basconia	2014–15	Tercera División	0	0	0	0	—		0	0
Basconia	2015–16	Tercera División	0	0	0	0	—		0	0
Basconia	2016–17	Tercera División	0	0	0	0	—		0	0
Basconia	Total		0	0	0	0	0	0	0	0
Sestao River (loan)	2014–15	Segunda División B	32	0	1	0	—		33	0
Tudelano (loan)	2015–16	Segunda División B	3	0	1	0	—		4	0
Leioa (loan)	2015–16	Segunda División B	16	2	0	0	2 (Note: Appearances in the 2016 Segunda División B playoffs)	2	18	4
Sestao River (loan)	2016–17	Segunda División B	37	2	2	0	—		39	2
Mirandés	2017–18	Segunda División B	30	10	2	0	4 (Note: Appearances in the 2018 Segunda División B play-offs)	1	36	11
Mirandés	2018–19	Segunda División B	35	8	0	0	5 (Note: Appearances in the 2019 Segunda División B play-offs)	0	40	8
Mirandés	Total		65	18	2	0	9	1	76	19
Almería	2019–20	Segunda División	2	0	0	0	—		2	0
Almería	2020–21	Segunda División	0	0	0	0	—		0	0
Almería	Total		2	0	0	0	0	0	2	0
Lugo (loan)	2019–20	Segunda División	27	1	0	0	—		27	1
Málaga (loan)	2020–21	Segunda División	39	5	3	1	—		42	6
Eibar	2021–22	Segunda División	26	1	3	0	2 (Note: Appearances in the 2022 Segunda División play-offs)	0	31	1
Eibar	2022–23	Segunda División	21	2	1	0	—		22	2
Eibar	Total		47	3	4	0	2	0	53	3
Career totals			268	31	11	1	13	3	294	33
