= Julio Martínez (footballer, born 2000) =

Spanish footballer

Julio
Personal information
- Full name: Julio Martínez Cortés
- Date of birth: 2 November 2000 (age 26)
- Place of birth: Requena, Spain
- Height: 1.78 m (5 ft 10 in)
- Position: Forward

Team information
- Current team: UCAM Murcia

Youth career
- 2015–2016: Valencia
- 2016–2018: Córdoba
- 2018–2019: Málaga

Senior career*
Years	Team	Apps	(Gls)
2019–2022	Málaga B	66	(26)
2019–2022	Málaga	14	(0)
2022–2024	Granada B	62	(13)
2024–	UCAM Murcia	39	(7)
- * Club domestic league appearances and goals as of 15 May 2026

Julio Martínez Cortés (born 2 November 2000) is a Spanish footballer who plays as a forward for UCAM Murcia.

== Club career ==
Born in Requena, Valencian Community, Martínez joined Málaga CF's youth setup in 2018, after stints at Córdoba CF and Valencia CF. He made his senior debut with the reserves on 25 August 2019, starting and scoring the opener in a 4–0 Tercera División home routing of Alhaurín de la Torre CF.

On 15 December 2019, after scoring ten goals in only 15 matches for the B's, Martínez made his first team debut by coming on as a late substitute for Armando Sadiku in a 0–0 away draw against Extremadura UD in the Segunda División. On 6 July 2022, he moved to another reserve team, Club Recreativo Granada in Segunda Federación.
