= Issa Fomba =

Malian footballer

Personal information
- Date of birth: 24 May 2001 (age 25)
- Place of birth: Bamako, Mali
- Height: 1.75 m (5 ft 9 in)
- Position: Winger

Team information
- Current team: Artis Brno
- Number: 11

Youth career
- Derby Académie
- 2019–2020: Málaga

Senior career*
Years	Team	Apps	(Gls)
2020–2023	Málaga	7	(0)
2020–2023	Málaga B	55	(3)
2023–2024	Leganés B	11	(4)
2024	→ Vyškov (loan)	14	(3)
2024–2025	Vyškov	11	(0)
2024–2025	→ Baník Ostrava (loan)	4	(0)
2024	→ Baník Ostrava B (loan)	6	(0)
2025–	Artis Brno	28	(4)
- * Club domestic league appearances and goals as of 24 May 2026

Issa Fomba (born 24 May 2001) is a Malian professional footballer who plays as a winger for Czech First League club Artis Brno.

== Career ==
Born in Bamako, Fomba joined Málaga CF's youth setup in the 2019 summer, from hometown side Derby Académie. In August 2020, after scoring 25 goals for the Juvenil A squad, he was included in the pre-season with the main squad.

On 13 September 2020, before even having appeared with the reserves, Fomba made his professional debut by coming on as a second-half substitute for Yanis Rahmani in a 2–0 loss at CD Tenerife in the Segunda División championship. He subsequently featured more regularly for the B-team, scoring his first senior goal on 20 December, in a 2–2 Tercera División away draw against Alhaurín de la Torre CF.

On 31 January 2023, Fomba's agency announced that he would not renew his contract with Málaga, which was due to expire in June.

In July 2023, Fomba joined Leganés, joining up with the club's reserve side for the 2023–24 season. In January 2024, he joined Czech National Football League club MFK Vyškov on loan until the end of the season. On 16 July 2024, Fomba joined Czech First League club Baník Ostrava on a one-year loan deal with option to make the move permanent. After half year, four marches for the first team and six for the reserve team, Baník Ostrava send Fomba back to MFK Vyškov.

On 24 June 2025, Fomba signed a two-year contract with Artis Brno.
