= Luis Muñoz (footballer, born 1997) =

Spanish footballer

Personal information
- Full name: José Luis Muñoz León
- Date of birth: 23 February 1997 (age 29)
- Place of birth: Málaga, Spain
- Height: 1.81 m (5 ft 11 in)
- Positions: Centre back; defensive midfielder

Team information
- Current team: Marbella
- Number: 25

Youth career
- 2004–2007: 26 de Febrero
- 2007–2008: Puerto Malagueño
- 2008–2009: La Mosca
- 2009–2010: 26 de Febrero
- 2010–2016: Málaga

Senior career*
Years	Team	Apps	(Gls)
2015–2017	Málaga B	57	(5)
2016–2023	Málaga	99	(7)
2017–2018	→ Lugo (loan)	12	(0)
2018–2019	→ Córdoba (loan)	26	(0)
2023–2025	Cartagena	53	(6)
2025–	Marbella	15	(0)

International career
2015	Spain U18	4	(0)
2016	Spain U19	5	(0)
- * Club domestic league appearances and goals as of 10 June 2026

José Luis Muñoz León (born 23 February 1997) is a Spanish professional footballer who plays as either a central defender or a defensive midfielder for Primera Federación club Marbella.

== Club career ==
Born in Málaga, Andalusia, Muñoz joined Málaga CF's youth setup in 2010, after representing 26 de Febrero CD (two stints), CD Puerto Malagueño Guimbarda Iberia and La Mosca UD. He made his senior debut with the reserves on 20 September 2015, playing the full 90 minutes in a 2–2 Tercera División away draw against Loja CD.

On 26 September 2016, Muñoz signed his first professional contract running until 2020. On 16 October he scored his first senior goal, netting his team's sixth through a penalty in a 7–0 home routing of Alhaurín de la Torre CF.

Muñoz made his first team – and La Liga – debut on 21 November 2016, coming on as a second half substitute for fellow youth graduate Javier Ontiveros in a 0–0 away against FC Barcelona. The following 29 August, he was loaned to Segunda División side CD Lugo for one year.

On 14 August 2018, Muñoz was loaned to Córdoba CF in the second division, for one year. Upon returning, he started to feature regularly with the Blanquiazules, signing a professional two-year deal on 1 October 2020.

On 30 June 2023, after Málaga's relegation, Muñoz left after activating an exit clause on his contract, and signed a two-year deal with FC Cartagena also in the second division on 18 July.
