= Andrés Caro =

Spanish association football player

Personal information
- Full name: Andrés Carlos Caro Serrano
- Date of birth: 1 February 2004 (age 22)
- Place of birth: Rincón de la Victoria, Spain
- Height: 1.85 m (6 ft 1 in)
- Position: Centre back

Team information
- Current team: Valencia B
- Number: 2

Youth career
- 2010–2011: Rincón
- 2011–2021: Málaga

Senior career*
Years	Team	Apps	(Gls)
2021–2023	Málaga B	26	(0)
2021–2024	Málaga	10	(0)
2023–2024	→ Betis B (loan)	19	(0)
2024–	Valencia B	42	(0)

International career^{‡}
2022	Spain U18	2	(1)
- * Club domestic league appearances and goals as of 15 May 2026 ‡ National team caps and goals as of 28 April 2022

Andrés Carlos Caro Serrano (born 1 February 2004) is a Spanish footballer who plays as a central defender for Valencia CF Mestalla.

== Club career ==
Born in Rincón de la Victoria, Málaga, Andalusia, Caro joined Málaga CF's youth setup in 2011, from hometown side CD Rincón. He made his senior debut with the reserves on 9 May 2021, coming on as a second-half substitute in a 3–0 Tercera División home win against CD Huétor Vega.

Caro made his first team debut at the age of just 17 on 30 May 2021, replacing fellow youth graduate Juande late into a 3–0 home win against CD Castellón in the Segunda División championship. On 31 August 2023, he was loaned to Betis Deportivo Balompié for one year, with a buyout clause.

Upon returning from loan, Caro was deemed surplus to requirements, and terminated his contract with the Albicelestes on 10 August 2024.
