= Genaro Rodríguez =

Spanish footballer

Personal information
- Full name: Genaro Rodríguez Serrano
- Date of birth: 23 March 1998 (age 28)
- Place of birth: Gerena, Spain
- Height: 1.85 m (6 ft 1 in)
- Position: Centre back

Team information
- Current team: Ibiza
- Number: 16

Youth career
- 2006–2017: Sevilla

Senior career*
Years	Team	Apps	(Gls)
2017–2018	Sevilla C	26	(0)
2018–2020	Sevilla B	41	(3)
2019	Sevilla	0	(0)
2020–2021	Mirandés	20	(1)
2021–2024	Málaga	79	(6)
2024–2025	Córdoba	21	(0)
2025–2026	União de Leiria	17	(0)
2026–	Ibiza	3	(0)

International career
2016	Spain U18	2	(0)
2016	Spain U19	3	(1)
2016	Spain U20	6	(1)
- * Club domestic league appearances and goals as of 12 September 2026

Genaro Rodríguez Serrano (born 23 March 1998), sometimes known as just Genaro, is a Spanish professional footballer who plays for Primera Federación club Ibiza. Mainly a central defender, he can also play as a central midfielder.

== Club career ==
Born in Gerena, Seville, Andalusia, Genaro was a Sevilla FC youth graduate. On 13 May 2016, he renewed his contract until 2019.

Genaro made his senior debut with the C-team on 17 September 2017, starting and being sent off in a 4–0 Tercera División home routing of CD San Roque de Lepe. He made his professional debut with the reserves the following 25 March, coming on as a late substitute for Curro in a 0–1 away win against Real Zaragoza in the Segunda División championship.

On 7 July 2018, Genaro renewed his contract until 2021. He made his first-team debut on 12 December 2019, starting and playing the full match in a 0–1 away loss against APOEL FC, on Sevilla's last group match of the 2019–20 UEFA Europa League.

On 5 October 2020, Genaro terminated his contract with the Nervionenses, and signed a one-year contract with CD Mirandés in the second division just hours later. He scored his first professional goal on 12 December, netting the game's only in an away success over CF Fuenlabrada.

On 13 August 2021, free agent Genaro agreed to a 1+1 deal with Málaga CF, still in the second tier. The following 12 April, he renewed his contract until 2024.

Genaro only became a regular starter for the Albicelestes in the 2023–24 season, as they achieved promotion from Primera Federación, but departed the club on 30 June 2024 as his link expired. On 14 July, he agreed to a one-year deal with Córdoba CF, also promoted to division two.

On 19 July 2025, Genaro moved to União de Leiria in Portuguese second tier on a one-season deal.

== Honours ==
Sevilla

- UEFA Europa League: 2019–20
