= Alejandro Benítez =

Spanish footballer

Personal information
- Full name: Alejandro Benítez Palomero
- Date of birth: 15 May 2000 (age 26)
- Place of birth: Mijas, Spain
- Height: 1.69 m (5 ft 7 in)
- Position: Right back

Team information
- Current team: Ciudad de Lucena

Youth career
- 2013–2019: Málaga

Senior career*
Years	Team	Apps	(Gls)
2018–2022	Málaga B	51	(1)
2020–2022	Málaga	9	(0)
2022–2023	Algeciras	20	(0)
2023–2024	Marbella	22	(0)
2024–2025	Mijas-Las Lagunas	26	(1)
2025–	Ciudad de Lucena	8	(0)
- * Club domestic league appearances and goals as of 9 November 2025

Alejandro Benítez Palomero (born 15 May 2000) is a Spanish footballer who plays as a right back for Ciudad de Lucena in the fifth-tier Tercera Federación.

== Club career ==
Benítez was born in Mijas, Málaga, Andalusia, and joined Málaga CF's youth setup in 2013, aged 13. He made his senior debut with the reserves on 26 August 2018, starting in a 0–1 Segunda División B home loss against San Fernando CD.

Definitely promoted to the B-team for the 2019–20 season, Benítez scored his first senior goal on 5 January 2020, netting the opener in a 2–1 home win against Atlético Mancha Real. He made his first team debut on 13 September, starting in a 0–2 loss at CD Tenerife in the Segunda División championship.

On 1 July 2022, free agent Benítez signed a two-year contract with Algeciras CF in Primera Federación.
