= Sergio Guerrero (footballer) =

Spanish footballer (born 1999)

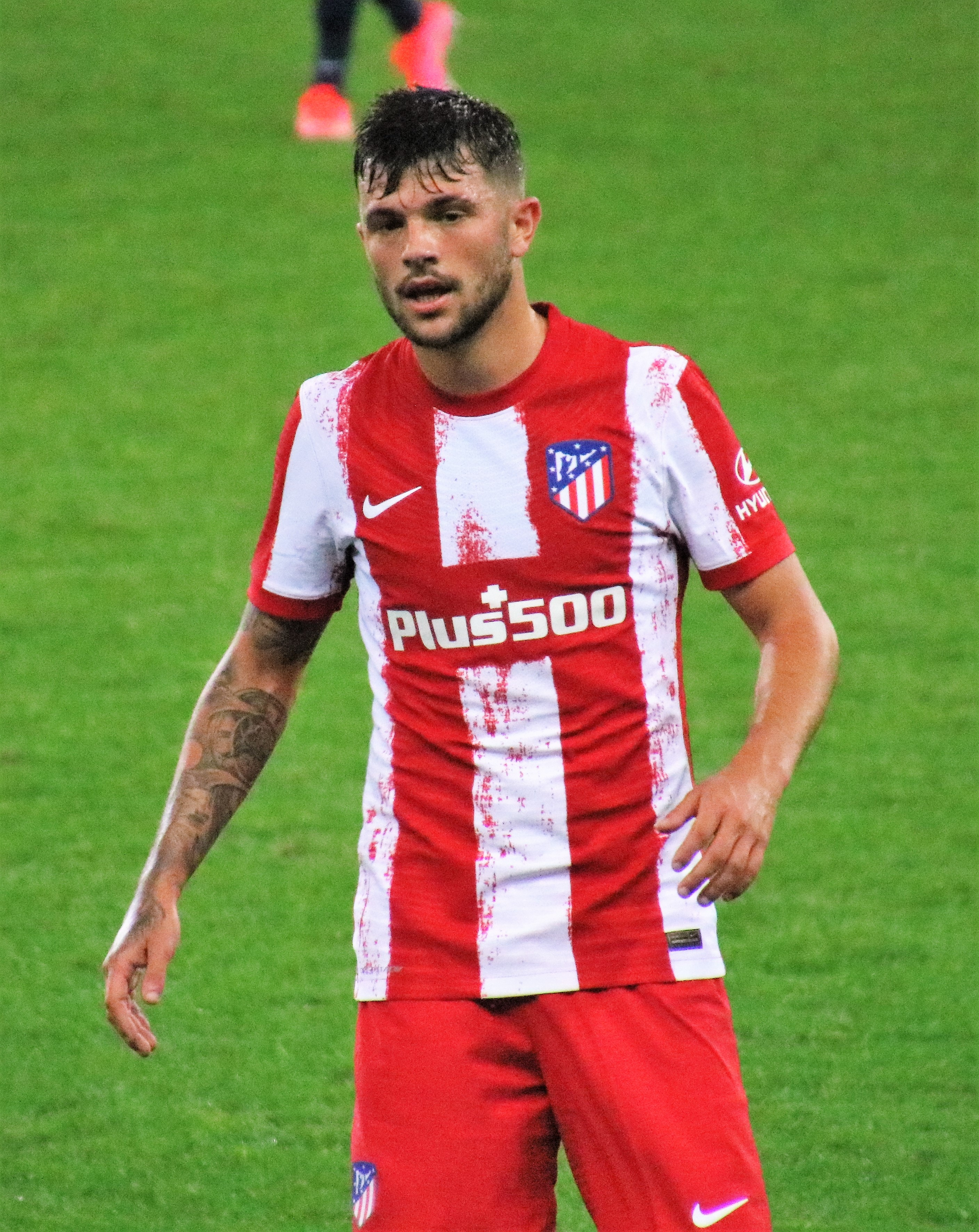
- Guerrero in 2021

Personal information
- Full name: Sergio Guerrero Romero
- Date of birth: 13 January 1999 (age 27)
- Place of birth: Alameda, Spain
- Height: 1.74 m (5 ft 9 in)
- Position: Midfielder

Team information
- Current team: Bruk-Bet Termalica
- Number: 23

Youth career
- Maracena
- 2014–2018: Málaga

Senior career*
Years	Team	Apps	(Gls)
2017–2021	Málaga B	47	(4)
2018–2019	→ El Palo (loan)	29	(1)
2021	Málaga	3	(0)
2021–2024	Atlético Madrid B	105	(8)
2024–2025	Cartagena	35	(1)
2025–	Bruk-Bet Termalica	28	(2)
- * Club domestic league appearances and goals as of 21:36, 25 May 2026 (UTC)

Sergio Guerrero Romero (born 13 January 1999), sometimes known as Mini, is a Spanish professional footballer who plays as a midfielder for I liga club Bruk-Bet Termalica Nieciecza.

== Club career ==
Born in Alameda, Málaga, Andalusia, Guerrero joined Málaga CF's youth setup in 2014, after a brief period at UD Maracena. He made his senior debut with the reserves on 29 October 2017, coming on as a second-half substitute for Pablo Clavería in a 6–1 Tercera División home routing of Guadix CF, and contributed with one further appearance as the side achieved promotion to the Segunda División B.

On 3 October 2018, Guerrero was loaned to fourth division side CD El Palo for the season. He scored his first senior goal on 31 October in a 3–1 home win against Antequera CF, and established himself as a regular starter during his loan spell.

Mini returned to Málaga in July 2019, being again assigned to the B-team. He made his first team – and professional – debut on 8 May 2021, replacing Joaquín Muñoz in a 1–1 away draw against RCD Mallorca in the Segunda División.

On 9 July 2021, Guerrero moved to another reserve team, Atlético Madrid B of the Tercera División RFEF. He became and undisputed starter of the side in their two consecutive promotions, becoming team captain in the process and being an unused substitute with the main squad in two UEFA Champions League matches.

On 11 July 2024, Guerrero signed a two-year contract with FC Cartagena in the second division.

On 22 July 2025, Guerrero joined recently promoted Polish top flight side Bruk-Bet Termalica Nieciecza on a two-year deal with an extension option.
