= Jozabed =

Spanish footballer (born 1991)

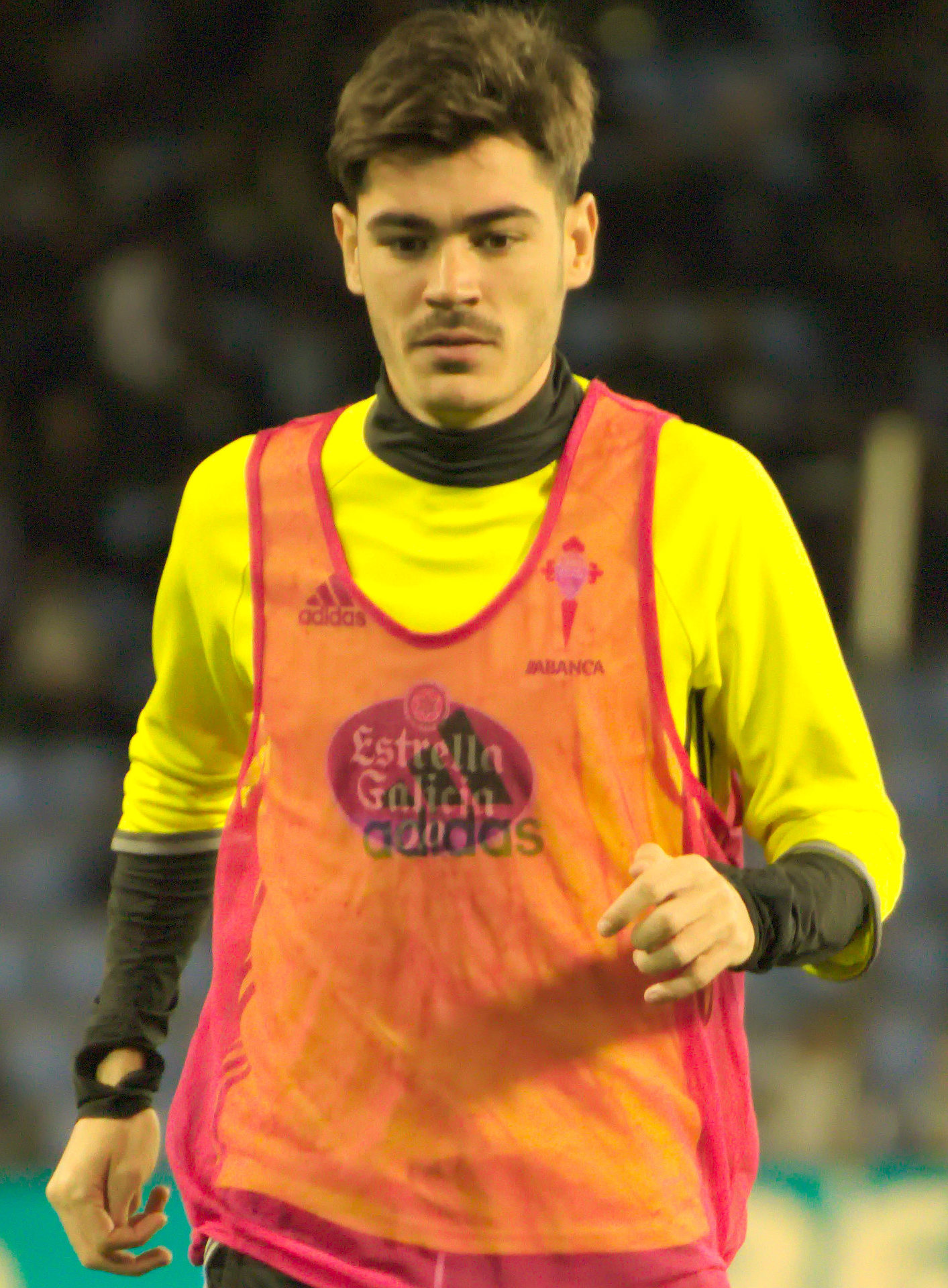
- Jozabed with Celta in 2017

Personal information
- Full name: Jozabed Sánchez Ruiz
- Date of birth: 8 March 1991 (age 35)
- Place of birth: Mairena del Alcor, Spain
- Height: 1.80 m (5 ft 11 in)
- Position: Central midfielder

Youth career
- Sevilla

Senior career*
Years	Team	Apps	(Gls)
2010–2011	Sevilla C	30	(5)
2011–2013	Sevilla B	56	(12)
2013	Ponferradina	3	(0)
2013–2014	Jaén	36	(4)
2014–2016	Rayo Vallecano	50	(11)
2016–2017	Fulham	7	(0)
2017	→ Celta (loan)	19	(2)
2017–2021	Celta	44	(0)
2019–2020	→ Girona (loan)	12	(0)
2020–2021	→ Málaga (loan)	29	(2)
2021–2023	Málaga	51	(0)
2023–2024	Lugo	33	(1)
- * Club domestic league appearances and goals as of 25 May 2024

Jozabed Sánchez Ruiz (born 8 March 1991), known simply as Jozabed (Spanish pronunciation: [xoθaˈβeð]), is a Spanish professional footballer who plays as a central midfielder.

== Club career ==
=== Early years ===
Born in Mairena del Alcor, Province of Seville, Jozabed finished his youth career with Sevilla FC, and made his senior debut in 2010–11 with the C team. He was promoted to the reserves in the summer of 2012.

On 1 February 2013, Jozabed terminated his contract with the Andalusians and joined SD Ponferradina. He appeared in his first game as a professional eight days later, playing the last 30 minutes in a 3–0 away defeat against Villarreal CF in the Segunda División.

Jozabed returned to his native region on 9 July 2013, signing with Real Jaén also in the second tier. He made his official debut on 18 August, scoring in a 1–2 home loss to SD Eibar.

=== Rayo Vallecano ===
On 20 June 2014, after Jaén's relegation, Jozabed moved to La Liga with Rayo Vallecano after agreeing to a three-year deal. He made his debut in the competition on 4 October, coming on as a late substitute in a 0–2 home loss against FC Barcelona.

Jozabed scored his first goal in the Spanish top flight on 4 January 2015, his team's first in a 2–1 win at RCD Espanyol.

=== Fulham ===
On 12 August 2016, Jozabed moved abroad for the first time in his career, on a three-year contract with Championship club Fulham for an undisclosed fee. His first match took place four days later, when he replaced Floyd Ayité in a 1–1 draw away to Leeds United.

=== Celta ===
On 13 January 2017, Jozabed was loaned to RC Celta de Vigo of the Spanish top division until June. On 4 July, he signed a permanent four-year deal.

On 26 August 2019, after being deemed surplus to requirements by Fran Escribá, Jozabed was loaned to second-tier Girona FC for one year. On 16 September of the following year, he renewed his contract until 2022 and was immediately loaned out to second division side Málaga CF for the season.

== Career statistics ==
As of match played 30 May 2021

Appearances and goals by club, season and competition
Club	Season	League			National cup		League cup		Other		Total	
Club	Season	Division	Apps	Goals	Apps	Goals	Apps	Goals	Apps	Goals	Apps	Goals
Sevilla B	2011–12	Segunda División B	35	7	—		—		—		35	7
Sevilla B	2012–13	Segunda División B	21	5	—		—		—		21	5
Sevilla B	Total		56	12	0	0	0	0	0	0	56	12
Ponferradina	2012–13	Segunda División	3	0	0	0	—		—		3	0
Jaén	2013–14	Segunda División	36	4	3	1	—		—		39	5
Rayo Vallecano	2014–15	La Liga	23	1	2	1	—		—		25	2
Rayo Vallecano	2015–16	La Liga	27	10	2	0	—		—		29	10
Rayo Vallecano	Total		50	11	4	1	0	0	0	0	54	12
Fulham	2016–17	Championship	7	0	0	0	1	0	—		8	0
Celta	2016–17	La Liga	19	2	1	0	—		8 (Note: Appearances in Europa League)	0	28	2
Celta	2017–18	La Liga	24	0	3	0	—		—		27	0
Celta	2018–19	La Liga	20	0	1	0	—		—		21	0
Celta	Total		63	2	5	0	0	0	8	0	76	2
Girona (loan)	2019–20	Segunda División	12	0	3	0	—		—		15	0
Málaga (loan)	2020–21	Segunda División	29	2	1	0	—		—		30	2
Career total			256	32	16	2	1	0	8	0	281	33
