= Bilal Ouacharaf =

Moroccan association football player

Bilal
Personal information
- Full name: Bilal Ouacharaf Guennouni
- Date of birth: 9 May 2002 (age 24)
- Place of birth: El Ejido, Spain
- Height: 1.80 m (5 ft 11 in)
- Position: Right back

Team information
- Current team: Felgueiras
- Number: 70

Youth career
- 2013–2014: El Ejido
- 2014–2017: Poli Aguadulce
- 2017–2021: Málaga

Senior career*
| Years | Team | Apps | (Gls) |
| 2021–2023 | Málaga B | 51 | (3) |
| 2022–2023 | Málaga | 4 | (0) |
| 2024–2025 | Fuenlabrada | 30 | (1) |
| 2025–2026 | Talavera | 16 | (1) |
| 2026– | Felgueiras | 2 | (0) |

International career
| 2018–2019 | Morocco U17 | 5 | (2) |
| 2021 | Morocco U20 | | |
| 2022 | Morocco U23 | 6 | (0) |
- * Club domestic league appearances and goals as of 12 September 2026

Bilal Ouacharaf Guennouni (born 9 May 2002) is a footballer who plays as a right back for Liga Portugal 2 club Felgueiras. Born in Spain, he represents Morocco internationally.

== Club career ==
Born in El Ejido, Almería, Andalusia, Ouacharaf joined Málaga CF's youth setup in October 2017, after representing AD Polideportivo Aguadulce and hometown side CD El Ejido. On 15 February 2019, he signed his first professional contract, running until 2021.

Ouacharaf renewed his link with Málaga on 7 July 2021, and made his senior debut with the reserves on 12 September of that year, coming on as a second-half substitute for David Larrubia in a 2–1 Tercera División RFEF away loss against Motril CF. He scored his first senior goal on 24 October, netting the B's opener in a 4–2 home win over CD Intergym Melilla.

Ouacharaf made his first team debut on 22 December 2022, starting in a 2–1 loss at Gimnàstic de Tarragona, for the season's Copa del Rey. His Segunda División debut occurred the following 27 May, as he replaced Alberto Escassi in a 1–1 home draw against UD Ibiza, as both sides were already relegated.

== International career ==
Born in Spain, Ouacharaf represented Morocco at under-17, under-20 and under-23 levels.
