= Moussa Diarra (footballer, born 2002) =

Malian association football player

Personal information
- Date of birth: 20 January 2002 (age 24)
- Place of birth: Bamako, Mali
- Height: 1.88 m (6 ft 2 in)
- Position: Centre-back

Team information
- Current team: Málaga B

Youth career
- Derby Académie
- 2020–2021: Málaga

Senior career*
Years	Team	Apps	(Gls)
2021–	Málaga B	32	(2)
2021–	Málaga	10	(0)
2025	→ Marbella (loan)	4	(0)
- * Club domestic league appearances and goals as of 16 May 2026

Moussa Diarra (born 20 January 2002) is a Malian footballer who plays as a central defender for Spanish club Atlético Malagueño.

== Career ==
Born in Bamako, Diarra moved to Málaga CF's youth categories in 2020, from local side Derby Académie. On 23 July 2021, he signed a new three-year contract with the club.

Diarra made his senior debut with the reserves on 12 September 2021, starting in a 2–1 Tercera División RFEF away loss against Motril CF. He scored his first goal on 24 October, netting the B's third in a 4–2 home win over CD Intergym Melilla.

Diarra made his first team debut on 14 December 2021, starting in a 1–0 loss at CF Rayo Majadahonda, for the season's Copa del Rey. He made his professional debut the following 24 September, playing the full 90 minutes in a 1–1 Segunda División home draw against Villarreal CF B.

On 18 January 2025, Diarra renewed his contract until 2028, and was immediately loaned to Primera Federación side Marbella FC until June. However, he suffered a knee injury in February which kept him sidelined for nine months, and was demoted to the B-side in January 2026 in order to regain match fitness.
