= Dani Barrio =

Spanish professional footballer

Personal information
- Full name: Daniel Barrio Álvarez
- Date of birth: 10 February 1987 (age 39)
- Place of birth: Gijón, Spain
- Height: 1.90 m (6 ft 3 in)
- Position: Goalkeeper

Youth career
- Veriña
- 2005–2006: Sporting Gijón

Senior career*
Years	Team	Apps	(Gls)
2006–2009	Sporting B	8	(0)
2009–2010	Ribadesella	38	(0)
2010–2011	Marino	36	(0)
2011–2013	Oviedo	37	(0)
2013–2015	Leganés	33	(0)
2015–2019	Melilla	141	(0)
2019–2020	Numancia	42	(0)
2020–2022	Málaga	38	(0)
2022–2023	Burgos	3	(0)
- * Club domestic league appearances and goals as of 28 May 2023

Daniel "Dani" Barrio Alvarez (born 10 February 1987) is a Spanish professional footballer who plays as a goalkeeper.

== Club career ==
Born in Gijón, Asturias, Barrio graduated with Sporting de Gijón's youth setup, and made his senior debuts with the reserves in the 2006–07 campaign, in Tercera División. He first arrived in Segunda División B in 2011, signing for Real Oviedo, after stints with Ribadesella CF and Marino de Luanco, both in the fourth level.

On 11 August 2013 Barrio moved to CD Leganés, also in the third division. He appeared in 31 matches during the season, as the Madrid side were promoted to Segunda División after a ten-year absence.

On 11 September 2014 Barrio made his professional debut, starting in a 1–1 home draw against CD Numancia, for the campaign's Copa del Rey. He made his Segunda División debut on 8 February of the following year, playing the full 90 minutes in a 2–0 away win against RCD Mallorca.

In 2015, Barrio joined UD Melilla in the third division, being an undisputed first-choice during his spell. On 10 July 2019, he signed a one-year contract with CD Numancia in the second level.

On 28 August 2020, after suffering relegation, Barrio agreed to a two-year contract with Málaga CF. After two seasons acting mainly as a backup, he signed a one-year deal with fellow second level side Burgos CF on 30 June 2022.
