= Pablo Chavarría =

Argentine footballer (born 1988)

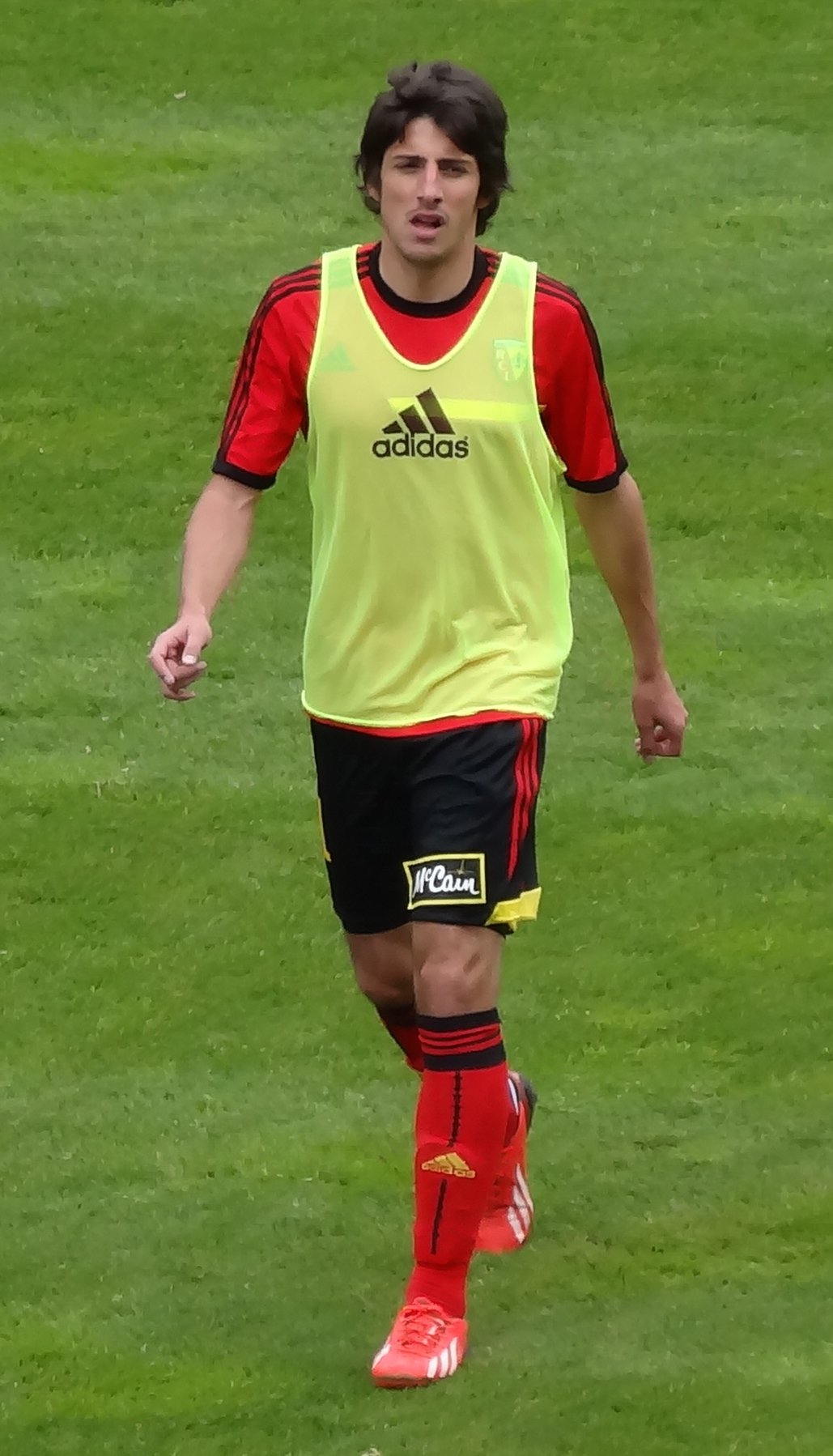
- Chavarría training for Lens in 2014

Personal information
- Full name: Pablo Alejandro Chavarría
- Date of birth: 2 January 1988 (age 38)
- Place of birth: Las Perdices, Argentina
- Height: 1.85 m (6 ft 1 in)
- Position: Striker

Team information
- Current team: Racing de Córdoba
- Number: 9

Youth career
- 2004–2008: Belgrano

Senior career*
Years	Team	Apps	(Gls)
2008–2010	Belgrano	64	(11)
2010–2013	Anderlecht	5	(1)
2011	→ Eupen (loan)	9	(4)
2011	→ Kortrijk (loan)	37	(5)
2012–2013	→ Kortrijk (loan)	28	(6)
2013–2016	Lens	91	(21)
2016–2019	Reims	95	(26)
2019–2020	Mallorca	15	(0)
2020–2023	Málaga	60	(9)
2023–2025	Belgrano	34	(2)
2025–	Racing de Córdoba	39	(8)
- * Club domestic league appearances and goals as of 17:07, 4 May 2026 (UTC)

Pablo Alejandro Chavarría (born 2 January 1988) is an Argentine professional footballer who plays as a striker for Racing de Córdoba.

== Career ==
=== Belgrano de Córdoba ===
Born in Las Perdices, Chavarría began playing football when he was three years old and participated in various tournament in his hometown, starting out with Acción Juvenil de General Deheza and stayed there until he was eight. He then began to change clubs regularly before going to France for a trial at Sochaux when he was 14. He impressed the club's management on trial, but he declined after deciding to return over personal reasons.

After returning to Argentina, Chavarría joined Perdices in 2003 and stayed there for six months. He then decided to travel to Córdoba to try his hand at Belgrano de Córdoba, which he successfully joined the side, where he began his professional career. After progressing through the ranks, he made his Belgrano de Córdoba debut in a 1–0 defeat to Chacarita Juniors on 9 September 2008. He then scored his first goal for the club, in a 1–1 draw against Aldosivi on 12 October 2008. He scored again six days later, in a 1–1 draw against Talleres de Córdoba. He then scored two goals in two appearances between 4 April 2009 and 11 April 2009 against Quilmes and Ferro Carril Oeste respectively. At the end of 2008–09 season for the Promocion, Chavarría scored six times in 33 appearances.

In the 2009–10 season, Chavarría began to establish himself in the first team, along with Franco Vázquez, and played an important part throughout the season. On 29 August 2009, he scored his first goal of the club, in a 3–1 win over San Martín de San Juan. Chavarría then scored four more goals, including two vital goals against Atlético de Rafaela and CAI. However, in a 2–2 draw against Boca Unidos on 1 May 2010, he scored but was later sent–off for a second bookable offence. Despite this, Chavarría went on to make 31 appearances and scoring 5 times in all competitions at the end of the season.

=== Anderlecht ===
In April 2010, Belgian Pro League champion Anderlecht were interested in signing Chavarría. Amongst interested were Ligue 1 side Toulouse and Liga MX side Club América. Amid to a transfer move, Chavarría began on working on his passport over a potential move to Anderlecht in May 2010. After passing the medical on 8 June 2010, it was confirmed on 9 June 2010 that the then 22-year-old forward signed a four-year contract with the club. Upon joining Anderlecht, Chavarría joined compatriots Suárez and Pier Barrios, being represented by the club on 23 June 2010.

Chavarría made his debut for the club in the third round of the Champions League play-off, in a 3–0 win over The New Saints on 3 August 2010. Several week later, on 23 August 2010, he made his league for the side, where he started and played for 63 minutes before being substituted, in a 3–0 win over Lokeren. Two months later, on 28 October 2010, he scored his first goal for the club in the sixth round of the Belgian Cup, as they beat UR La Louvière Centre 4–1 in penalty-shootout after the game ended 2–2. He provided an assist for Mbark Boussoufa who in turn assisted Chavarría for his first league goal for the club, in a match against Lierse.

Ahead of the 2012–13 season, Chavarría was named among three players without a future at Anderlecht under manager John van den Brom. Following his return to Anderlecht, he was involved with the transfer exchange when Anderlecht were keen to sign Ilombe Mboyo from Gent. He was also linked with a move to Waasland-Beveren.

After his departure from Anderlecht, Chavarría reflected his time there, saying that moving to Belgium was difficult and struggled to adjust with the changes, as he had to learn the language and culture within six months.

==== Eupen (loan) ====
In January 2011, Chavarría was loaned to Eupen to receive more first-team playing time.

After a slow start to his Eupen career, Chavarría scored his first goal for the club in a 1–1 draw against Lierse on 6 March 2011. In his next appearance, he played against his former club, as they drew 1–1 on 12 March 2011. In the Relegation Playoff against Charleroi in four legs, Chavarría scored three times against the side, scoring in the first leg and then scored twice in third leg. This led Eupen avoiding relegation. He added three more goals in the Belgian Second Division play-offs against Lommel and twice against Waasland-Beveren. However, the club lost all six games in the Belgian Second Division play-offs, resulting in their relegation. At the end of the 2010–11 season, Chavarría had played 13 games and scored 7 goals before returning to Anderlecht.

==== Kortrijk (loans) ====
In the 2011–12 season, Chavarría was loaned out to Kortrijk for the rest of the season.

Chavarría made his debut for the club in a 0–0 draw against Belgian side Westerlo in the opening game of the season. He scored two goals in two games against Club Brugge and Lokeren. However, during the match against Lokeren, he broken his nose and was substituted as a result. On 8 April 2012, he scored twice in a 3–1 win over Club Brugge. He made a double assist as Kortrijk beat his parent club 2–0. Chavarria would go on make his 45 appearances and score five times in all competitions.

On the last day of the transfer window, Chavarría joined Kortrijk on loan for the second time for the rest of the season. He scored his first goal in his second loan spell at Kortrijk in a 2–1 win over Standard Liège on 30 September 2012. After adding two more goals to his tally, he later scored twice in a 3–1 win over Cercle Brugge on 24 November 2012. Four days later, on 28 November 2012, Chavarría scored again, in a 1–0 win over Mons in the last 16 of the Beker Van Belgie. However, in a 3–2 loss against Lokeren on 21 December 2012, he received a straight red card in the 61st minute and Kortrijk lost 3–2. Initially suspended for two match and was given a €200 fine, his suspension was overturned, allowing him to return to the first team. Despite suffering a hamstring injury, Chavarría went on make the total of 33 appearances and scoring 8 times in all competitions for the side.

=== Lens ===
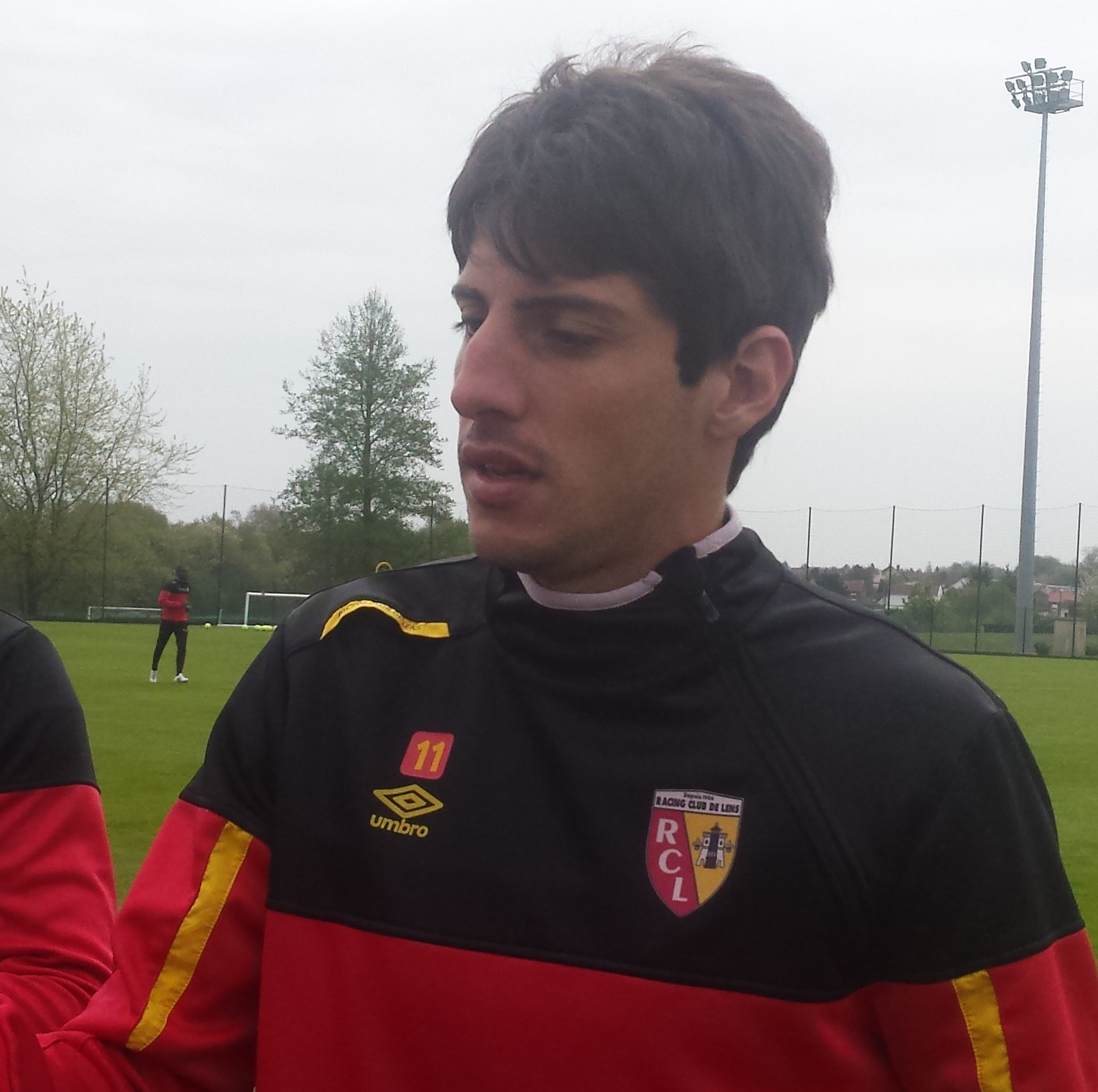
Chavarría in training at Lens.

On 17 July 2013, Chavarría signed for Lens in Ligue 2 for an undisclosed fee on a three-year deal after leaving Anderlecht for good.

Chavarría started his career at Lens with three goals in two games, scoring against Dijon and then scoring twice against Auxerre. On two occasions, he scored two goals in two matches, which the first one was between on 30 September 2013 and 7 October 2013 against Metz and Arles-Avignon; and the second one was between Dijon and Auxerre. In the Round of 32 in Coupe de France, he scored an equaliser against Bastia in a 2–1 win. During the season, he was included in a three-man attack with Yoann Touzghar and Danijel Ljuboja in a 4-4-2 formation by Manager Antoine Kombouaré. However, during a 1–1 draw against Le Havre on 17 February 2017, he sustained an injury, resulting being substituted in the second half and was sidelined for two weeks. Up until his injury in February, he went on to score the total of ten goals for the side. On 31 March 2014, he made his return in a match against Clermont, which resulted in a 1–1 draw. On 25 April 2014, he scored again, in a 1–1 draw against AS Nancy. In his first season at Lens, Chavarría finished as a second top-scorer behind Yoann Touzghar contributing to the club's promotion to Ligue 1.

In the 2014–15 season, Chavarría scored two times at the start of the against Reims and Bastia despite the club's poor start in Ligue 1. However, he soon suffered a hamstring injury that kept him out throughout December 2014 after sustaining it during a 2–0 win over Metz. After returning to the first team against Guingamp on 10 January 2015, he then scored again, in a 3–3 draw against Saint-Étienne on 6 February 2015. Chavarría later scored three vital goals, including against Toulouse, Lille and Nantes. However, despite the club's relegation back to Ligue 2, Chavarría went on to score 7 times in the total of 33 appearances.

In the 2015–16 season, which saw Lens back in Ligue 2, Chavarría was given the captaincy at the start of the season He played his first match as captain in the opening game of the season, with a 0–0 draw against Metz. On 21 September 2015, Chavarría scored his first goal of the season, in a 1–0 win over Valenciennes. Chavarría then scored two goals by the end of 2015 against Nîmes Olympique and Bourg-en-Bresse. His performance throughout December earned him this month Player of the Month. On 11 March 2016, he scored again, in a 1–1 draw against Clermont Foot. Several weeks later, Chavarría set up two goals, in a 3–0 win over Auxerre. Despite being on the sidelines from the first team, Chavarría finished the 2015–16 season, making 28 appearances and scoring 8 times in all competitions.

=== Reims ===
It was announced that Chavarría would be joining Reims, signing a two–year contract with an option of extension on 8 July 2016.

Chavarría made his Reims debut in the opening game of the season, playing the whole game, in a 1–1 draw against Amiens. Weeks later, on 17 August 2016, against Real Madrid in a friendly match, Chavarría scored a hat–trick, in a 5–3 defeat. After sidelined with an injury, he returned to the first team and continued to feature. On 28 October 2016, he scored his first goal for Reims, in a 1–0 win over Le Havre. After being absent again that kept him out throughout 2016, After returning to the first team from injury in January, Chavarría scored again, in a 1–1 draw against FC Tours on 3 February 2017. He then scored two goals in two games between 17 February 2017 and 27 February 2017 against Clermont Foot and Stade Brestois Despite being out of the first team, Chavarría later added three more goals, adding the tally to seven goals this season in the total of 29 appearances at his first season at Reims.

In the 2017–18 season, Chavarría started the season well when he scored two goals in five appearances against US Orléans and Bourg-en-Bresse. Since the start of the season, Chavarría said his aim was to help the side reach promotion to Ligue 1. He then scored on 13 September 2017, in a 5–0 win over Gazélec Ajaccio. Chavarría helped Stade de Reims win the 2017–18 Ligue 2, helping promote them to the Ligue 1 for the 2018–19 season.

=== Mallorca ===
On 5 July 2019, Chavarría joined La Liga side RCD Mallorca on a free transfer, signing a two-year contract. On 28 September of the following year, after 15 goalless appearances as his side suffered relegation, he reached an agreement with the club over his contract termination.

=== Málaga ===
On 28 September 2020, just hours after leaving Mallorca, Chavarría joined Segunda División's Málaga CF on a one-year deal. On 30 June 2023, after the club's relegation, he left after his contract expired.

== Personal life ==
He is of Italian descent. In May 2012, Chavarría and his girlfriend, Gisele, were expecting to have their first child. His wife, Gisele, gave birth to a baby boy, Batista, in November. The couple were married on 7 June 2014.

Chavarría was a childhood friend with Matías Suárez, who became his teammate at Belgrano and Anderlecht. Growing up, Chavarría supported Boca Juniors. He was born to Luis Chavarría, a footballer, and Nancy, and has four brothers, Romina, Melani, Matías and Ayelén.

== Career statistics ==
As of match played 14 April 2018

Appearances and goals by club, season and competition
Club	Season	League			National cup		League cup		Other		Total	
Club	Season	Division	Apps	Goals	Apps	Goals	Apps	Goals	Apps	Goals	Apps	Goals
Belgrano	2008–09	Argentine Primera División	2	0	0	0	0	0	0	0	2	0
Belgrano	2008–09	Primera B Nacional	31	6	0	0	0	0	0	0	31	6
Belgrano	2009–10	Primera B Nacional	31	5	0	0	0	0	0	0	31	5
Belgrano	Total		64	11	0	0	0	0	0	0	64	11
Anderlecht	2010–11	Belgian Pro League	5	1	1	1	0	0	2 (Note: One appearance in each of UEFA Champions League and UEFA Europa League)	0	8	2
Eupen (loan)	2010–11	Belgian Pro League	9	4	0	0	0	0	0	0	9	4
Kortrijk (loan)	2011–12	Belgian Pro League	37	5	7	0	0	0	0	0	44	5
Kortrijk (loan)	2012–13	Belgian Pro League	28	6	5	2	0	0	0	0	33	8
Lens	2013–14	Ligue 2	32	10	5	1	1	0	0	0	38	11
Lens	2014–15	Ligue 1	31	7	1	0	1	0	0	0	33	7
Lens	2015–16	Ligue 2	28	4	0	0	0	0	0	0	28	4
Lens	Total		91	21	6	1	2	0	0	0	99	22
Lens II	2013–14	Championnat de France Amateur	1	0	0	0	0	0	0	0	1	0
Reims	2016–17	Ligue 2	27	7	1	0	1	0	0	0	29	7
Reims	2017–18	Ligue 2	32	12	0	0	2	0	0	0	34	12
Reims	Total		59	19	1	0	3	0	0	0	63	19
Career total			294	67	20	4	5	0	2	0	321	71

== Honours ==
Reims

- Ligue 2: 2017–18
