= Juande (footballer, born 1999) =

Spanish footballer

Personal information
- Full name: Juan de Dios Rivas Margalef
- Date of birth: 7 July 1999 (age 27)
- Place of birth: Córdoba, Spain
- Height: 1.87 m (6 ft 2 in)
- Position: Centre back

Team information
- Current team: Piast Gliwice
- Number: 5

Youth career
- 2014–2018: Málaga

Senior career*
Years	Team	Apps	(Gls)
2018–2020	Málaga B	58	(0)
2020–2024	Málaga	114	(8)
2024–2025	Tenerife	11	(0)
2025–	Piast Gliwice	36	(6)
- * Club domestic league appearances and goals as of 10:27, 6 September 2026 (UTC)

Juan de Dios Rivas Margalef (born 7 July 1999), commonly known as Juande, is a Spanish professional footballer who plays as a central defender for Ekstraklasa club Piast Gliwice.

== Club career ==
Born in Córdoba, Andalusia, Juande joined Málaga CF's youth setup in 2014, aged 14. He made his senior debut with the reserves on 2 September 2018, starting in a 1–3 Segunda División B away loss against Marbella FC.

Juande made his first-team debut on 14 January 2020, starting in a 1–0 home win over SD Ponferradina in the Segunda División. On 6 August, he signed his first professional contract, agreeing to a deal until 2023, and was definitely promoted to the main squad on 5 October, being assigned the number 5 shirt.

Juande scored his first professional goal on 22 October 2020, netting the winner in a 1–0 home success over Sporting de Gijón. The following 31 August, he further extended his link until 2024.

On 1 July 2024, after helping the Blanquiazules in their promotion to the second division, free agent Juande signed a three-year contract with CD Tenerife. On 20 July of the following year, after suffering relegation, he terminated his link with the club, and immediately moved to Polish Ekstraklasa club Piast Gliwice on a two-year deal, with a one-year option.
