= Alberto Escassi =

Spanish footballer (born 1989)

Personal information
- Full name: Alberto Escassi Oliva
- Date of birth: 28 February 1989 (age 37)
- Place of birth: Málaga, Spain
- Height: 1.85 m (6 ft 1 in)
- Positions: Centre-back; midfielder

Youth career
- 2004–2005: Málaga
- 2005–2007: El Palo
- 2007–2008: Getafe

Senior career*
Years	Team	Apps	(Gls)
2008–2011	Getafe B	90	(0)
2010–2012	Getafe	1	(0)
2011–2012	→ Hércules (loan)	17	(0)
2012–2014	Hércules	57	(1)
2014–2015	Alcorcón	17	(0)
2015–2016	Llagostera	34	(0)
2016–2020	Numancia	130	(11)
2020–2023	Málaga	104	(4)
2023–2025	Ibiza	48	(5)
2025–2026	Marbella	33	(1)
- * Club domestic league appearances and goals as of 10 June 2026

Alberto Escassi Oliva (born 28 February 1989) is a Spanish professional footballer who plays as either a central defender or a defensive midfielder.

== Club career ==
Escassi was born in Málaga, Andalusia. After playing for two other clubs as a youth, including hometown's Málaga CF, he finished his football development with Getafe CF, making his senior debut in 2008 and helping the reserves to promote to Segunda División B for the first time ever in his second year.

On 13 April 2010, Escassi made his first-team – and La Liga – debut, replacing veteran Javier Casquero in the dying minutes of a 3–0 home win over Villarreal CF. On 16 December he appeared in that season's UEFA Europa League against BSC Young Boys, with the Madrid side winning 1–0 but being eliminated in the group stage.

For the 2011–12 campaign, both Escassi and teammate Adrián Sardinero were loaned to Hércules CF of the Segunda División. On 10 July 2012 both players moved on a permanent basis, with the former signing for two years.

Escassi scored his first professional goal on 26 August 2012, his team's in a 1–2 home loss against fierce rivals Elche CF. On 13 August 2014, after the Valencians' relegation, he signed a two-year deal with AD Alcorcón in the same league.

On 30 June 2015, Escassi terminated his contract, and joined UE Llagostera also of the second tier hours later. On 28 June 2016, following their relegation, he signed for CD Numancia.

On 24 October 2017, Escassi was one of two players on target in a 2–1 defeat of top-flight side Málaga in the first leg of the fourth round of the Copa del Rey, in spite of trailing 1–0 in stoppage time. During the season, he was regularly deployed as a central defender by manager Jagoba Arrasate.

Escassi returned to his first club Málaga on 28 August 2020, after agreeing to a three-year deal. In July 2023, he joined UD Ibiza of Primera Federación.
