= Alhaurín de la Torre CF =

Association football club in Spain

Alhaurín de la Torre
- Full name: Alhaurín de la Torre Club de Fútbol
- Nicknames: Alahurinos, Lauro
- Founded: 4 December 1969; 56 years ago
- Ground: Los Manantiales, Alhaurín, Andalusia, Spain
- Capacity: 2,500
- Chairman: Francisco Javier Ríos Martín
- Manager: Nene Montero
- League: División de Honor – Group 2
- 2025–26: División de Honor – Group 2, 11th of 16
- Website: https://www.alhaurindelatorrecf.es
Home colours	Away colours

Alhaurín de la Torre Club de Fútbol is a Spanish football team based in Alhaurín de la Torre, in the autonomous community of Andalusia. Founded in 1969, it currently plays in División de Honor – Group 2, holding home matches at Estadio Los Manantiales, with a 2,500-seat capacity.

== History ==
On 4 December 1969, Lauro Club de Fútbol was founded, being later renamed into Alhaurín de la Torre Club de Fútbol. The official field became the Municipal, initially without tiers or seats, the spectators were located around the field as can be seen in the photographs. This stadium has had several renovations in its history, now called Municipal Football Stadium "El Pinar", on the road to Joaquín Blume.

Inscribed in the Málaga Football Federation in 1973, the club only played regional football until 2005, when they achieved promotion to the Tercera División after winning their Primera Andaluza group.

== Season to season ==
Season	Tier	Division	Place	Copa del Rey
1973–74	6	2ª Reg.		
1974–75	6	2ª Reg.		
1975–76	6	2ª Reg.	3rd	
1976–77	6	2ª Reg.	16th	
1977–78	7	2ª Reg.	4th	
1978–79	7	2ª Reg.	11th	
1979–80	7	2ª Reg.	9th	
1980–81	6	1ª Reg.	10th	
1981–82	5	Reg. Pref.	3rd	
1982–83	6	1ª Reg.	7th	
1983–84	6	1ª Reg.	13th	
1984–85	6	1ª Reg.	20th	
1985–86	6	1ª Reg.	1st	
1986–87	5	Reg. Pref.	7th	
1987–88	5	Reg. Pref.	16th	
1988–89	6	1ª Reg.	6th	
1989–90	5	Reg. Pref.	14th	
1990–91	6	1ª Reg.	7th	
1991–92	6	1ª Reg.		
1992–93	6	1ª Reg.	4th	

Season	Tier	Division	Place	Copa del Rey
1993–94	6	1ª Reg.	9th	
1994–95	6	1ª Reg.		
1995–96	5	Reg. Pref.	13th	
1996–97	5	Reg. Pref.	10th	
1997–98	5	Reg. Pref.	11th	
1998–99	5	Reg. Pref.	12th	
1999–2000	5	Reg. Pref.	14th	
2000–01	5	Reg. Pref.	5th	
2001–02	5	Reg. Pref.	4th	
2002–03	5	Reg. Pref.	4th	
2003–04	5	Reg. Pref.	5th	
2004–05	5	1ª And.	1st	
2005–06	4	3ª	11th	
2006–07	4	3ª	15th	
2007–08	4	3ª	19th	
2008–09	5	1ª And.	5th	
2009–10	5	1ª And.	1st	
2010–11	4	3ª	2nd	
2011–12	4	3ª	13th	
2012–13	4	3ª	19th	

Season	Tier	Division	Place	Copa del Rey
2013–14	5	1ª And.	1st	
2014–15	4	3ª	16th	
2015–16	4	3ª	14th	
2016–17	4	3ª	20th	
2017–18	5	Div. Hon.	2nd	
2018–19	4	3ª	14th	
2019–20	4	3ª	20th	
2020–21	4	3ª	6th / 4th	
2021–22	5	3ª RFEF	14th	
2022–23	6	Div. Hon.	4th	
2023–24	6	Div. Hon.	6th	
2024–25	6	Div. Hon.	11th	
2025–26	6	Div. Hon.		

- 12 seasons in Tercera División
- 1 season in Tercera División RFEF
