= 2019–20 Elche CF season =

Elche
2019–20 season
- Chairman: Joaquín Buitrago Marhuenda
- Head coach: Pacheta
- Stadium: Estadio Manuel Martínez Valero
- Segunda División: 6th (promoted via play-offs)
- Copa del Rey: Round of 32
- Top goalscorer: League: Fidel (9); All: Fidel (10)
Home colours	Away colours

The 2019–20 season was Elche 96th competitive season the club's history. During this season, the club have competed in Segunda División, and the Copa del Rey. The season covered a period from 1 July 2019 to 23 August 2020.

== Squad ==
As of 1 February 2020.

Note: Flags indicate national team as defined under FIFA eligibility rules; some limited exceptions apply. Players may hold more than one non-FIFA nationality.

No.	Pos.	Nation	Player
1	GK	ESP	Miguel San Román (on loan from Atlético Madrid)
2	DF	ESP	Tekio
3	DF	ESP	Andoni López (on loan from Athletic Bilbao)
4	MF	ESP	Ramón Folch
5	DF	ESP	Gonzalo Verdú
6	MF	ESP	Manuel Sánchez
7	FW	ESP	Nino
8	MF	ESP	Víctor Rodríguez
10	MF	ESP	Iván Sánchez
11	FW	ESP	Pere Milla
12	DF	ESP	Dani Calvo

No.	Pos.	Nation	Player
13	GK	ESP	Édgar Badía
16	MF	ESP	Fidel
17	MF	ESP	Josan
19	FW	ESP	Claudio Medina
20	FW	ESP	Dani Escriche (on loan from Huesca)
21	MF	COD	Omenuke Mfulu
22	FW	BRA	Jonathas
23	DF	ESP	Juan Cruz
24	DF	ESP	Josema
27	DF	ESP	Óscar Gil

=== Reserve team ===
Note: Flags indicate national team as defined under FIFA eligibility rules; some limited exceptions apply. Players may hold more than one non-FIFA nationality.

No.	Pos.	Nation	Player
26	MF	ESP	Alberto Rubio
28	GK	ESP	Luis Castillo
29	FW	ESP	Nacho Ramón
30	MF	ESP	César Moreno

No.	Pos.	Nation	Player
31	MF	ESP	Adrián Molina
32	FW	MAR	Mourad El Ghezouani
35	DF	ESP	Nacho Pastor

=== Out on loan ===
Note: Flags indicate national team as defined under FIFA eligibility rules; some limited exceptions apply. Players may hold more than one non-FIFA nationality.

No.	Pos.	Nation	Player
—	MF	ESP	Jony Ñíguez (at Alcoyano until 30 June 2020)
—	FW	ESP	Manu Justo (at Celta B until 30 June 2020)

=== Current technical staff ===
Position	Staff
Manager	(Spain) Pacheta
Assistant manager	(Argentina) Dani Mayo
Coach	(Spain) Chema Monzón
Goalkeeping coach	(Spain) Miguel Escalona
Fitness coach	(Spain) Manuel Sempere
Fitness coach	(Spain) Fidel
Scout	(Spain) Guillem Galmés

Last updated: October 2019
Source: Elche CF

== Pre-season and friendlies ==
Win Draw Loss

19 July 2019 Friendly	Torrellano (Spain)	0–3	(Spain) Elche	Torrellano
19:30 CEST (UTC+2)		Summary		Stadium: Polideportivo Isabel Fernández

20 July 2019 Friendly	Elche Ilicitano (Spain)	1–9	(Spain) Elche	Elche
19:00 CEST (UTC+2)		Summary		Stadium: Campo de fútbol José Díez Iborra

26 July 2019 Friendly	Orihuela (Spain)	0–3	(Spain) Elche	Orihuela
20:00 CEST (UTC+2)		Summary		Stadium: Estadio Municipal Los Arcos

27 July 2019 Friendly	UCAM Murcia (Spain)	0–2	(Spain) Elche	Murcia
19:30 CEST (UTC+2)		Summary		Stadium: Estadio Enrique Roca de Murcia

2 August 2019 Friendly	Elche (Spain)	2–0	(Spain) Ibiza	La Nucia
19:30 CEST (UTC+2)		Summary		Stadium: Estadio Camilo Cano

3 August 2019 Friendly	Albacete (Spain)	1–0	(Spain) Elche	La Manga
19:00 CEST (UTC+2)		Summary		Stadium: La Manga Club Football Centre A

7 August 2019 Friendly	Elche (Spain)	0–2	(Spain) Levante	Alcoy
19:00 CEST (UTC+2)		Summary		Stadium: Campo Municipal El Collao

== Competitions ==
=== Overview ===
Competition	First match	Last match	Starting round	Final position	Record							
Competition	First match	Last match	Starting round	Final position	Pld	W	D	L	GF	GA	GD	Win %
Segunda División	17 August 2019	20 July 2020	Matchday 1	6th	42	16	13	13	52	44	+8	38.10
Segunda División promotion play-offs	13 August 2020	23 August 2020	Semi-finals	Winners	4	2	2	0	2	0	+2	50.00
Copa del Rey	17 December 2019	22 January 2020	First round	Round of 32	3	2	1	0	5	2	+3	66.67
Total					49	20	16	13	59	46	+13	40.82

Last updated: 23 August 2020
Source: Competitions

=== Segunda División ===
==== League table ====
Pos	Team	Pld	W	D	L	GF	GA	GD	Pts	Promotion, qualification or relegation
4	Almería	42	17	13	12	62	43	+19	64	Qualification to promotion play-offs
5	Girona	42	17	12	13	48	43	+5	63	Qualification to promotion play-offs
6	Elche (O, P)	42	16	13	13	52	44	+8	61	Qualification to promotion play-offs
7	Rayo Vallecano	42	13	21	8	60	50	+10	60 (Note: Rayo Vallecano finished ahead of Fuenlabrada on head-to-head points: Fuenlabrada 2–2 Rayo Vallecano, Rayo Vallecano 1–0 Fuenlabrada.)	
8	Fuenlabrada	42	15	15	12	47	40	+7	60	

Source: LaLiga Soccerway
Rules for classification: 1) points; 2) head-to-head points; 3) head-to-head goal difference; 4) goal difference; 5) number of goals scored
(O) Play-off winners; (P) Promoted

==== Results summary ====
Overall								Home						Away					
Pld	W	D	L	GF	GA	GD	Pts	W	D	L	GF	GA	GD	W	D	L	GF	GA	GD
42	16	13	13	52	44	+8	61	9	8	5	28	20	+8	7	5	8	24	24	0

Last updated: 20 July 2020.
Source: La Liga SmartBank

==== Results by round ====
Round	1	2	3	4	5	6	7	8	9	10	11	12	13	14	15	16	17	18	19	20	21	22	23	24	25	26	27	28	29	30	31	32	33	34	35	36	37	38	39	40	41	42
Ground	H	A	A	H	A	H	A	H	A	H	A	H	A	H	A	H	A	H	A	H	A	H	A	H	A	H	A	H	A	H	A	H	A	H	H	A	H	A	A	H	A	H
Result	L	W	L	D	W	D	D	W	L	D	W	L	L	W	W	D	D	W	D	L	W	D	L	D	W	W	D	L	L	W	W	D	L	W	L	D	D	W	L	W	L	W
Position	20	10	13	14	8	10	12	6	12	12	9	10	14	12	9	11	10	7	7	9	8	7	10	9	6	5	6	6	7	7	6	6	7	5	6	6	6	6	7	6	7	6

Updated to match(es) played on 20 July 2020. Source: La Liga SmartBank
A = Away; H = Home; W = Win; D = Draw; L = Loss

==== Matches ====
The fixtures were revealed on 4 July 2019.

17 August 2019 1	Elche	0–2	Fuenlabrada	Elche
20:00 CEST (UTC+2)	Verdú (yellow card) 15'; Calvo (yellow card) 28'	Summary	Fraile 31' (pen.); Prieto 40'; José Fran (yellow card) 45+1'; Nteka (yellow card) 56'; Clavería (yellow card) 65'	Stadium: Estadio Manuel Martínez Valero; Attendance: 8,974; Referee: (Spain) Jon González

24 August 2019 2	Alcorcón	1–2	Elche	Alcorcón
20:00 CEST (UTC+2)	Calvo 5' (o.g.); Boateng (yellow card) 25'; Juan Aguilera (yellow card) 45+2' (yellow-red card) 81'; Elgezabal (yellow card) 46'; Pomares (yellow card) 62'	Summary	Gonzalo Villar (yellow card) 16'; Verdú 47' 84'	Stadium: Estadio Municipal de Santo Domingo; Attendance: 1,907; Referee: (Spain) Luis Milla

30 August 2019 3	Zaragoza	1–0	Elche	Zaragoza
21:00 CEST (UTC+2)	Carlos Nieto (yellow card) 19'; Igbekeme (yellow card) 25'; Luis Suárez (yellow card) 77' (goal) 87' (pen.); Guti (yellow card) 90+5'	Summary	Iván Sánchez (yellow card) 32'	Stadium: La Romareda; Attendance: 22,767; Referee: (Spain) Víctor Areces

8 September 2019 4	Elche	1–1	Lugo	Elche
18:00 CEST (UTC+2)	Verdú (yellow card) 6'; Nino 31'; Gonzalo Villar (yellow card) 40'; Qasmi (yellow card) 60'	Summary	Seoane (yellow card) 6'; Domínguez (yellow card) 54' (goal) 68'; Valentín (yellow card) 90+2'	Stadium: Estadio Manuel Martínez Valero; Attendance: 10,019; Referee: (Spain) Santiago Varón

15 September 2019 5	Real Oviedo	0–2	Elche	Oviedo
16:00 CEST (UTC+2)	Tejera (yellow card) 24' (yellow-red card) 78'; Obeng (red card) 73'	Summary	Qasmi 15' 52'; Juan Cruz (yellow card) 26'; Gonzalo Villar (yellow card) 66'	Stadium: Estadio Carlos Tartiere; Attendance: 11,263; Referee: (Spain) Jorge Figueroa

19 September 2019 6	Elche	1–1	Tenerife	Elche
19:00 CEST (UTC+2)	Qasmi 8' (yellow card) 56'; Gonzalo Villar (yellow card) 33'	Summary	Lasso 54'	Stadium: Estadio Manuel Martínez Valero; Attendance: 8,194; Referee: (Spain) Javier Iglesias

22 September 2019 7	Numancia	1–1	Elche	Soria
18:00 CEST (UTC+2)	Castellano 2'; Curro (yellow card) 56'; Escassi (red card) 71'	Summary	Ramón Folch 22'; Verdú (yellow card) 40'; Manuel (yellow card) 66'	Stadium: Nuevo Estadio Los Pajaritos; Attendance: 3,082; Referee: (Spain) Álvaro Moreno

28 September 2019 8	Elche	1–0	Ponferradina	Elche
20:00 CEST (UTC+2)	Qasmi 4' (yellow card) 28'; Milla (yellow card) 44'; Óscar Gil (yellow card) 45'; Gonzalo Villar (yellow card) 57'; Fidel (yellow card) 77'	Summary	Valcarce (yellow card) 42'; Trigueros (yellow card) 47'; Russo (yellow card) 90+1'	Stadium: Estadio Manuel Martínez Valero; Attendance: 8,249; Referee: (Spain) Iñaki Bikandi

1 October 2019 9	Extremadura	2–0	Elche	Almendralejo
19:00 CEST (UTC+2)	Ledesma (yellow card) 44' (goal) 52'; Rocha (yellow card) 57'; Cristian Rodríguez 83'	Summary	Manuel (yellow card) 32' (yellow-red card) 51'; Medina (yellow card) 90'; Juan Cruz (yellow card) 90+2'	Stadium: Estadio Francisco de la Hera; Attendance: 6,422; Referee: (Spain) Alejandro Muñiz

5 October 2019 10	Elche	1–1	Rayo Vallecano	Elche
18:00 CEST (UTC+2)	Verdú (yellow card) 13'; Nino 66'	Summary	Álvaro García (yellow card) 64'; Andrés Martín 78'; Trejo (yellow card) 90'	Stadium: Estadio Manuel Martínez Valero; Attendance: 9,086; Referee: (Spain) Aitor Gorostegui

12 October 2019 11	Girona	0–2	Elche	Girona
12:00 CEST (UTC+2)	Gumbau (yellow card) 39'; Soriano (yellow card) 83'; Aday (yellow card) 84'; Samuel Sáiz (yellow card) 90+4'	Summary	Iván Sánchez 5'; Ortiz (yellow card) 25' (goal) 76'; Andoni López (yellow card) 62'	Stadium: Estadi Municipal de Montilivi; Attendance: 8,439; Referee: (Spain) Daniel Ocón

19 October 2019 12	Elche	0–1	Sporting Gijón	Elche
18:00 CEST (UTC+2)	Gonzalo Villar (yellow card) 39'; Manuel Sánchez (yellow card) 72'; Fidel (yellow card) 72'	Summary	Manu García 27' (yellow card) 72'; Valiente (yellow card) 35'; Salvador (yellow card) 63'; Molinero (yellow card) 76'; Pablo Pérez (yellow card) 77'	Stadium: Estadio Manuel Martínez Valero; Attendance: 9,374; Referee: (Spain) Miguel Ortiz

27 October 2019 13	Huesca	2–0	Elche	Huesca
18:00 CET (UTC+1)	Miguelón (yellow card) 30'; Galán (yellow card) 37'; Okazaki 45'; Juan Carlos 59'; Raba (yellow card) 73'	Summary	Milla (yellow card) 42'; Manuel Sánchez (yellow card) 44'; Gonzalo Villar (yellow card) 68'; Qasmi (yellow card) 90+1'	Stadium: Estadio El Alcoraz; Attendance: 6,525; Referee: (Spain) Juan Pulido

3 November 2019 14	Elche	4–2	Mirandés	Elche
20:00 CET (UTC+1)	Fidel 5' (pen.) 29' 60' (pen.); Manuel Sánchez (yellow card) 7'; Nino (yellow card) 78'; Qasmi 84' (pen.)	Summary	Sergio González (yellow card) 3'; Guridi 45+1'; Álvaro Rey (yellow card) 73' (goal) 90+2'; Franquesa (yellow card) 82'; Vicente (yellow card) 84'	Stadium: Estadio Manuel Martínez Valero; Attendance: 8,560; Referee: (Spain) Jon González

10 November 2019 15	Deportivo La Coruña	1–3	Elche	A Coruña
12:00 CET (UTC+1)	Bergantiños (yellow card) 14'; Mollejo 26' (yellow card) 51'; Javi Montero (yellow card) 31'; Salva Ruiz (yellow card) 79'	Summary	Manuel Sánchez (yellow card) 7'; Verdú 13'; Qasmi (yellow card) 15'; Fidel 57' (pen.); Juan Cruz (yellow card) 75'; Iván Sánchez (yellow card) 83'; Milla 87'	Stadium: Abanca-Riazor; Attendance: 11,690; Referee: (Spain) Isidro Díaz de Mera

16 November 2019 16	Elche	1–1	Almería	Elche
18:30 CET (UTC+1)	Fidel (yellow card) 13'; Iván Sánchez (yellow card) 27'; Nino 53'	Summary	Balliu (yellow card) 30'; Owona 85'; Vada (yellow card) 90+2'	Stadium: Estadio Manuel Martínez Valero; Attendance: 9,706; Referee: (Spain) Oliver De La Fuente

24 November 2019 17	Málaga	3–3	Elche	Málaga
16:00 CET (UTC+1)	Pacheco (yellow card) 12' (goal) 39'; Luis Muñoz (yellow card) 17'; Mohamedi (yellow card) 21'; Luis Hernández (yellow card) 57'; Sadiku 79' (pen.); Antoñín 81'	Summary	Fidel 23' (pen.) 28'; Gonzalo Villar (yellow card) 26' (goal) 64'; Juan Cruz (yellow card) 41'; Medina (yellow card) 62'; Manuel Sánchez (yellow card) 64'; Óscar Gil (yellow card) 74'; Milla (yellow card) 82'	Stadium: La Rosaleda Stadium; Attendance: 14,040; Referee: (Spain) Álvaro Moreno

1 December 2019 18	Elche	2–0	Racing Santander	Elche
18:00 CET (UTC+1)	Óscar Gil (yellow card) 2'; Qasmi 21'; Nino 51'; Verdú (yellow card) 62'	Summary	David Carmona (yellow card) 7'; Alexis (yellow card) 64'; Yoda (yellow card) 75'; Lombardo (yellow card) 90+2'	Stadium: Estadio Manuel Martínez Valero; Attendance: 9,501; Referee: (Spain) Jorge Figueroa

8 December 2019 19	Cádiz	0–0	Elche	Cádiz
21:00 CET (UTC+1)	Lozano (yellow card) 25'; Espino (yellow card) 77'	Summary	Manuel Sánchez (yellow card) 20'; Medina (yellow card) 79'	Stadium: Estadio Ramón de Carranza; Attendance: 16,686; Referee: (Spain) Daniel Trujillo

15 December 2019 20	Elche	2–3	Las Palmas	Elche
18:00 CET (UTC+1)	Fidel 24' (pen.); Josan 34'; Manuel Sánchez (yellow card) 59'; Juan Cruz (yellow card) 72'; Ramón Folch (yellow card) 82'	Summary	Mantovani (yellow card) 22'; Ramírez 62'; Juan Cruz 66' (o.g.); Narváez 73'	Stadium: Estadio Manuel Martínez Valero; Attendance: 10,753; Referee: (Spain) Luis Milla

21 December 2019 21	Albacete	0–1	Elche	Albacete
16:00 CET (UTC+1)	Ojeda (yellow card) 18'; Manaj (yellow card) 28'; Azamoum (yellow card) 51'	Summary	Calvo (yellow card) 57'; Óscar Gil (yellow card) 64'; Qasmi 74'; Fidel (yellow card) 85'	Stadium: Estadio Carlos Belmonte; Attendance: 7,645; Referee: (Spain) Iosu Galech

4 January 2020 22	Elche	1–1	Huesca	Elche
20:00 CET (UTC+1)	Gonzalo Villar (yellow card) 19'; Verdú (yellow card) 70'; Milla (yellow card) 85' (goal) 90+2'	Summary	Luisinho (yellow card) 31'; Mosquera (yellow card) 36'; Rico 55'; Miguelón (yellow card) 85'	Stadium: Estadio Manuel Martínez Valero; Attendance: 8,909; Referee: (Spain) José López

14 January 2020 23	Sporting Gijón	1–0	Elche	Gijón
19:00 CET (UTC+1)	Đurđević (yellow card) 80'; García (yellow card) 84'; Manu García 86'	Summary	Óscar Gil (yellow card) 52'; Ramón Folch (yellow card) 82'	Stadium: El Molinón; Attendance: 13,728; Referee: (Spain) Jon González

19 January 2020 24	Elche	1–1	Alcorcón	Elche
12:00 CET (UTC+1)	Dani Calvo 38' (yellow card) 69'; Ramón Folch (yellow card) 90+1'	Summary	Sosa (yellow card) 35'; Pomares 47'; Diéguez (yellow card) 71'; Laure (red card) 85'; Mula (yellow card) 90+3'	Stadium: Estadio Manuel Martínez Valero; Attendance: 8,464; Referee: (Spain) Juan Pulido

26 January 2020 25	Almería	0–2	Elche	Almería
16:00 CET (UTC+1)	Núñez (yellow card) 8' (yellow-red card) 38'; Maraš (yellow card) 35'; Vada (yellow card) 39'	Summary	Óscar Gil (yellow card) 50'; Juan Cruz (yellow card) 57'; Calvo (yellow card) 59'; Fidel 63'; Verdú (yellow card) 67'; Badía (yellow card) 84'; Milla 88'	Stadium: Estadio de los Juegos Mediterráneos; Attendance: 11,237; Referee: (Spain) Alejandro Muñiz

1 February 2020 26	Elche	2–0	Málaga	Elche
21:00 CET (UTC+1)	Milla 29'; Mfulu (yellow card) 60'; Verdú (yellow card) 71'; Escriche 79'	Summary	Cifu (yellow card) 45+1'; Adrián (yellow card) 65'	Stadium: Estadio Manuel Martínez Valero; Attendance: 9,988; Referee: (Spain) Gorka Sagues

9 February 2020 27	Lugo	2–2	Elche	Lugo
18:15 CET (UTC+1)	Rahmani 13'; Seoane (yellow card) 27'; Cristian (yellow card) 45'; Carrillo 61' (yellow card) 80'; Peybernes (yellow card) 66'	Summary	Óscar Gil (yellow card) 60'; Verdú (yellow card) 70'; Ramón Folch (yellow card) 75'; Nino 86' 88'	Stadium: Estadio Anxo Carro; Attendance: 4,246; Referee: (Spain) Oliver De La Fuente

15 February 2020 28	Elche	1–2	Zaragoza	Elche
21:00 CET (UTC+1)	Milla 18'; Óscar Gil (yellow card) 71'; Escriche (yellow card) 84'; Juan Cruz (yellow card) 90+3'	Summary	Soro 13'; Suárez 26' (yellow card) 61'; Atienza (yellow card) 52'	Stadium: Estadio Manuel Martínez Valero; Attendance: 11,287; Referee: (Spain) Daniel Ocón

22 February 2020 29	Tenerife	1–0	Elche	Santa Cruz de Tenerife
18:15 CET (UTC+1)	Dani Gómez 13'; Álex Muñoz (yellow card) 33'; Alberto Jiménez (yellow card) 48'	Summary	Josan (yellow card) 45+2'; Mfulu (yellow card) 46'; Gonzalo Verdú (yellow card) 70'; Tekio (yellow card) 80'; Ramón Folch (yellow card) 89'	Stadium: Estadio Heliodoro Rodríguez López; Attendance: 11,507; Referee: (Spain) Rubén Ávalos

1 March 2020 30	Elche	2–0	Numancia	Elche
16:00 CET (UTC+1)	Manuel Sánchez 36' (yellow card) 47'; Iván Sánchez (yellow card) 60'; Jonathas 65'	Summary	Héctor Hernández (red card) 50'; Higinio Marín (yellow card) 70'	Stadium: Estadio Manuel Martínez Valero; Attendance: 10,240; Referee: (Spain) Alejandro Muñiz

8 March 2020 31	Rayo Vallecano	2–3	Elche	Madrid
12:00 CET (UTC+1)	Mario Suárez 30' (pen.); Advíncula (yellow card) 45'; Isi (red card) 63'; Milić (yellow card) 84'; Montiel 88'; Catena (yellow card) 90+3'	Summary	Manuel (yellow card) 45'; Óscar Gil 58' (yellow card) 73'; Milla 67'; Escriche 79'; Fidel (yellow card) 90+2'	Stadium: Campo de Fútbol de Vallecas; Attendance: 9,932; Referee: (Spain) Luis Milla

12 June 2020 32	Elche	1–1	Extremadura	Elche
19:30 CEST (UTC+2)	Jonathas 22'; Óscar Gil (yellow card) 82'	Summary	Cruz (yellow card) 41'; Roberto Olabe (yellow card) 49'; Bastos 52'; Cristian Rodríguez (red card) 90+2'	Stadium: Estadio Manuel Martínez Valero; Attendance: Behind closed doors Referee: (Spain) Jorge Figueroa

15 June 2020 33	Ponferradina	2–1	Elche	Ponferrada
19:30 CEST (UTC+2)	Javi Navarro (yellow card) 33'; Russo 45+1' (yellow card) 65'; Valcarce 72'; Crespo (yellow card) 85' (yellow-red card) 87'; René (yellow card) 90+3'	Summary	Mfulu (yellow card) 35'; Manuel Sánchez (yellow card) 40'; Nino 42'; Iván Sánchez (yellow card) 62'; Verdú (yellow card) 67'	Stadium: Estadio El Toralín; Attendance: Behind closed doors Referee: (Spain) Iñaki Bikandi

19 June 2020 34	Elche	1–0	Girona	Elche
19:30 CEST (UTC+2)	Escriche 47'; Badía (yellow card) 53'; Óscar Gil (yellow card) 57'; López (yellow card) 69'	Summary	Juanpe (yellow card) 24'; Aday (yellow card) 42'; Stuani (yellow card) 64'; Zeballos (yellow card) 78'; Sáiz (yellow card) 90+3'	Stadium: Estadio Manuel Martínez Valero; Attendance: Behind closed doors Referee: (Spain) Álvaro Moreno Aragón

23 June 2020 35	Elche	0–1	Deportivo La Coruña	Elche
19:30 CEST (UTC+2)	Manuel (yellow card) 37'; Tekio (yellow card) 54' (yellow-red card) 78'; Fidel (yellow card) 74'	Summary	Shibasaki (red card) 32'; Luis Ruiz (yellow card) 35'; Vallejo 65'	Stadium: Estadio Manuel Martínez Valero; Attendance: Behind closed doors Referee: (Spain) Dámaso Arcediano Monescillo

27 June 2020 36	Las Palmas	1–1	Elche	Las Palmas
19:30 CEST (UTC+2)	Castro 30'; Ramírez (yellow card) 35'; Claudio (yellow card) 88'; Pedri (yellow card) 90+1'	Summary	Verdú (yellow card) 31'; Juan Cruz 39'; Fidel (yellow card) 54'; Calvo (yellow card) 71'	Stadium: Estadio Gran Canaria; Attendance: Behind closed doors Referee: (Spain) Gorka Sagués Oscoz

30 June 2020 37	Elche	0–0	Cádiz	Elche
21:45 CEST (UTC+2)	Escriche (yellow card) 29'; Verdú (yellow card) 52'; Jonathas (yellow card) 88'	Summary	Bodiger (yellow card) 45+4'; Pombo (yellow card) 79'	Stadium: Estadio Manuel Martínez Valero; Attendance: Behind closed doors Referee: (Spain) Oliver De la Fuente Ramos

4 July 2020 38	Racing Santander	1–2	Elche	Santander
17:00 CEST (UTC+2)	Guillermo 33'	Report	Fidel 63' (pen.); Jonathas 72'	Stadium: El Sardinero; Attendance: Behind closed doors Referee: Juan Luis Pulido Santana

7 July 2020 39	Mirandés	1–0	Elche	Miranda de Ebro
19:30 CEST (UTC+2)	Marcos André 54'; Crisetig (yellow card) 90+1'	Report	Josan (yellow card) 52'; Manuel (yellow card) 78'	Stadium: Anduva; Attendance: Behind closed doors Referee: Santiago Varón Aceitón

13 July 2020 40	Elche	2–0	Albacete	Elche
CEST (UTC+2)				Stadium: Estadio Manuel Martínez Valero; Attendance: Behind closed doors

17 July 2020 41	Fuenlabrada	3–1	Elche	Fuenlabrada
21:00 CEST (UTC+2)	Cristóbal (yellow card) 25'; Nteka (yellow card) 37'; Ciss (yellow card) 41'; Martínez 47'; Fraile 51' (pen.); José Fran (yellow card) 90+3'; Rodríguez 90+4'	Report	Manuel (yellow card) 37'; Tekio (yellow card) 44'; Jonathas 75' (pen.), (yellow card) 89'; Sánchez (yellow card) 90+1'; Gonzalo (yellow card) 90+3'	Stadium: Fernando Torres; Attendance: Behind closed doors Referee: Jorge Figueroa Vázquez

20 July 2020 42	Elche	2–1	Real Oviedo	Elche
21:00 CEST (UTC+2)				Stadium: Estadio Manuel Martínez Valero; Attendance: Behind closed doors

==== Play-offs ====
13 August 2020 Semi-finals first leg	Elche	0–0	Zaragoza	Elche
22:00 CEST (UTC+2)	Jonathas (red card) 30'; Josema (yellow card) 71'; Fidel (yellow card) 87'; Gonzalo (yellow card) 90+4'	Report	Kagawa (yellow card) 44'	Stadium: Estadio Manuel Martínez Valero; Attendance: 0 Referee: Rubén Ávalos Barrera

16 August 2020 Semi-finals second leg	Zaragoza	0–1 (0–1 agg.)	Elche	Zaragoza
22:00 CEST (UTC+2)	Pereira (yellow card) 75'	Report	Manuel (yellow card) 6'; Fidel (yellow card) 22'; Nino 81'	Stadium: La Romareda; Attendance: 0 Referee: Jorge Figueroa Vázquez

20 August 2020 Final first leg	Elche	0–0	Girona	Elche
22:00 CEST (UTC+2)		Report	Ramalho (yellow card) 7'; Juanpe (yellow card) 45+2'	Stadium: Estadio Manuel Martínez Valero; Attendance: 0 Referee: Dámaso Arcediano Monescillo

23 August 2020 Final second leg	Girona	0–1 (0–1 agg.)	Elche	Girona
22:00 CEST (UTC+2)	Stuani (red card) 61'; Granell (yellow card) 85'	Report	Jonathas (yellow card) 22'; Sánchez (yellow card) 41'; Rodríguez (yellow card) 84'; Milla (yellow card) 85', (goal) 90+6'	Stadium: Estadi Montilivi; Attendance: 0 Referee: José Antonio López Toca

=== Copa del Rey ===
17 December 2019 First round	Gimnástica Segoviana	0–2	Elche	Segovia
20:30 CET (UTC+1)	Lucero (yellow card) 15'	Report	Moreno (yellow card) 7'; El Ghezouani 34'; Milla 81' (pen.)	Stadium: Estadio La Albuera; Attendance: 1,816; Referee: Isidro Díaz de Mera Escuderos

11 January 2020 Second round	Yeclano	1–2	Elche	Yecla
17:30 CET (UTC+1)	Alayeto 60'; Héctor (yellow card) 77'; Chino (yellow card) 85'	Report	El Ghezouani 21'; Tekio (yellow card) 46'; Manuel (yellow card) 50'; Milla 78'	Stadium: Estadio de La Constitución; Attendance: 4,000; Referee: Dámaso Arcediano Monescillo

22 January 2020 Round of 32	Elche	1–1 (a.e.t.) (4–5 p)	Athletic Bilbao	Elche
19:00 CET (UTC+1)	Fidel 41'; Manuel (yellow card) 58'; Gil (yellow card) 94'	Report	Williams 5'; Berchiche (yellow card) 96'; Martínez (yellow card) 98'	Stadium: Estadio Manuel Martínez Valero; Attendance: 13,400; Referee: José Luis Munuera Montero
	Penalties
	Manuel (penalty scored); Folch (penalty scored); Nino (penalty scored); Qasmi (penalty missed); Sánchez (penalty missed); Calvo (penalty scored); Tekio (penalty missed)		(penalty missed) R. García; (penalty scored) Muniain; (penalty missed) López; (penalty scored) Williams; (penalty scored) Villalibre; (penalty scored) Berchiche; (penalty scored) Vesga
