= 2019–20 Málaga CF season =

Málaga CF
2019–20 season
- Owner: Sheikh Abdullah Al Thani
- Manager: Víctor Sánchez
- Stadium: La Rosaleda
- Segunda División: 14th
- Copa del Rey: First round
Home colours	Away colours	Third colours

During the 2019–20 season, Málaga CF participated in Segunda División and the Copa del Rey. The season covered the period from 1 July 2019 to 20 July 2020.

== Current squad ==
As of 3 July 2020

Note: Flags indicate national team as defined under FIFA eligibility rules; some limited exceptions apply. Players may hold more than one non-FIFA nationality.

No.	Pos.	Nation	Player
1	GK	MAR	Munir
3	DF	ESP	Diego González
4	DF	ESP	Luis Hernández
5	DF	ESP	David Lombán
6	MF	MAR	Badr Boulahroud
7	DF	ESP	Juankar
8	MF	ESP	Adrián (captain)
9	FW	ALB	Armando Sadiku (on loan from Levante)
10	MF	ESP	Tete Morente
11	MF	POR	Renato Santos
12	DF	ESP	Cifu
14	MF	ARG	Esteban Rolón
15	DF	VEN	Mikel Villanueva
16	MF	VEN	Juanpi
17	FW	ESP	Sergio Buenacasa (on loan from Mallorca)

No.	Pos.	Nation	Player
19	MF	ESP	Aarón Ñíguez
22	MF	ESP	Dani Pacheco
24	MF	ALG	Mohamed Benkhemassa
26	DF	ESP	Cristo Romero
28	DF	ESP	Ismael Casas
29	DF	ESP	Juande
30	MF	ESP	Ramón Enríquez
31	MF	MAR	Hicham
32	DF	MAR	Abdel Abqar
33	MF	ESP	Iván Jaime
34	DF	ESP	Luis Muñoz
35	MF	ALB	Keidi Bare
36	GK	ESP	Kellyan
37	GK	ARG	Gonzalo Crettaz
40	MF	ESP	Julio Martínez

=== Reserve team ===
Note: Flags indicate national team as defined under FIFA eligibility rules; some limited exceptions apply. Players may hold more than one non-FIFA nationality.

No.	Pos.	Nation	Player
39	GK	ESP	Adrián Quintela
41	GK	ESP	Miguel
42	MF	ESP	Alberto Quintana
43	MF	ESP	Juan Cruz

No.	Pos.	Nation	Player
44	DF	ESP	Alejandro Benítez
45	MF	ESP	David Larrubia
46	FW	ESP	Rafa Camacho
47	MF	ESP	Mini

=== Out on loan ===
Note: Flags indicate national team as defined under FIFA eligibility rules; some limited exceptions apply. Players may hold more than one non-FIFA nationality.

No.	Pos.	Nation	Player
—	DF	ESP	Iván Rodríguez (at Ponferradina until 30 June 2020)
—	MF	ARG	Emanuel Cecchini (at Unión de Santa Fe until 31 January 2021)
—	MF	ESP	Álex Mula (at Alcorcón until 30 June 2020)
—	MF	ESP	José Rodríguez (at Fuenlabrada until 30 June 2020)

== Transfers ==
=== In ===
No.	Pos.	Nat.	Name	Age	EU	Moving from	Type	Transfer window	Ends	Transfer fee	Source
	DF	(Spain)	Luis Muñoz	22	EU	Córdoba	Loan return	Summer	2020	N/A	
	DF	(Venezuela)	Roberto Rosales	30	EU	Espanyol	Loan return	Summer	N/A	N/A	
	DF	(Venezuela)	Mikel Villanueva	26	Non-EU	Gimnàstic	Loan return	Summer	N/A	N/A	
	MF	(Argentina)	Emanuel Cecchini	22	Non-EU	Banfield (Argentina)	Loan return	Summer	2022	N/A	
	MF	(Spain)	Jony	27	EU	Alavés	Loan return	Summer	2020	N/A	
	MF	(Venezuela)	Juanpi	25	EU	Huesca	Loan return	Summer	N/A	N/A	
	MF	(Spain)	Keko	27	EU	Real Valladolid	Loan return	Summer	2020	N/A	
	MF	(Argentina)	Esteban Rolón	24	Non-EU	Genoa (Italy)	Loan return	Summer	2021	N/A	
	MF	(Morocco)	Adnane Tighadouini	26	EU	Esbjerg (Denmark)	Loan return	Summer	2020	N/A	
	FW	(Uruguay)	Michael Santos	26	Non-EU	Leganés	Loan return	Summer	2020	N/A	

Total spending: ▼€0

=== Out ===
No.	Pos.	Nat.	Name	Age	EU	Moving to	Type	Transfer window	Transfer fee	Source
5	CB	(Spain)	Pau Torres	22	EU	Villarreal	End of loan	Summer	N/A	
9	FW	(Argentina)	Gustavo Leschuk	27	EU	Shakhtar Donetsk (Ukraine)	End of loan	Summer	N/A	
10	MF	(Spain)	Iván Alejo	24	EU	Getafe	End of loan	Summer	N/A	
16	FW	(Ukraine)	Yevhen Seleznyov	33	EU	Akhisar Belediyespor (Turkey)	End of loan	Summer	N/A	
18	MF	(Spain)	Erik Morán	28	EU	AEK Athens (Greece)	End of loan	Summer	N/A	
21	MF	(Senegal)	Alfred N'Diaye	29	EU	Villarreal	End of loan	Summer	N/A	
24	FW	(Ivory Coast)	Mamadou Koné	27	EU	Leganés	End of loan	Summer	N/A	

Total income : ▲€0

== Pre-season and friendlies ==
Win Draw Loss

30 July 2019 Friendly	Málaga	1–1	Córdoba	Coín, Spain
19:00 CEST (UTC+2)	Vallejo 66'	Report	Juanto 10'	Stadium: Estadio José Burgos Quintana; Referee: Raúl Chavet García

1 August 2019 Friendly	Málaga	0–2	Mallorca	San Pedro de Alcántara, Spain
19:30 CEST (UTC+2)		Report	Junior 46'; Budimir 90'	Stadium: Marbella Football Center; Attendance: 1,000; Referee: Juan Gabriel Gallegos

10 August 2019 Friendly	Cádiz	1–0	Málaga	Cádiz, Spain
20:00 CEST (UTC+2)	Quintana 6'	Report		Stadium: Estadio Ramón de Carranza; Attendance: 8,150; Referee: Figueroa Vázquez

20 February 2020 Friendly	Málaga	1–0	Krasnodar	Marbella, Spain
12:00 CET (UTC+1)	Benkhemassa 21'	Report		Stadium: Ciudad De Malaga

== Competitions ==
=== Overview ===
Competition	First match	Last match	Starting round	Final position	Record							
Competition	First match	Last match	Starting round	Final position	Pld	W	D	L	GF	GA	GD	Win %
Segunda División	17 August 2019	20 July 2020	Matchday 1	14th	42	11	20	11	35	33	+2	26.19
Copa del Rey	17 December 2019		First round	First round	1	0	0	1	0	2	−2	0.00
Total					43	11	20	12	35	35	+0	25.58

Last updated: 20 July 2020
Source: Competitions

=== Segunda División ===
==== League table ====
Pos	Team	Pld	W	D	L	GF	GA	GD	Pts
12	Tenerife	42	14	13	15	50	46	+4	55
13	Sporting Gijón	42	14	12	16	40	38	+2	54
14	Málaga	42	11	20	11	35	33	+2	53 (Note: Málaga finished ahead of Oviedo on head-to-head points: Málaga 2–1 Oviedo, Oviedo 1–1 Málaga.)
15	Oviedo	42	13	14	15	49	53	−4	53
16	Lugo	42	12	16	14	43	54	−11	52 (Note: Lugo finished ahead of Albacete on head-to-head points: Albacete 0–1 Lugo, Lugo 1–0 Albacete.)

Source: LaLiga Soccerway
Rules for classification: 1) points; 2) head-to-head points; 3) head-to-head goal difference; 4) goal difference; 5) number of goals scored

==== Results summary ====
Overall								Home						Away					
Pld	W	D	L	GF	GA	GD	Pts	W	D	L	GF	GA	GD	W	D	L	GF	GA	GD
42	11	20	11	35	33	+2	53	8	9	4	25	18	+7	3	11	7	10	15	−5

Last updated: 20 July 2020.
Source: La Liga SmartBank

==== Results by round ====
Round	1	2	3	4	5	6	7	8	9	10	11	12	13	14	15	16	17	18	19	20	21	22	23	24	25	26	27	28	29	30	31	32	33	34	35	36	37	38	39	40	41	42
Ground	A	H	A	H	A	H	A	H	A	A	H	A	H	A	H	A	H	A	H	A	H	A	H	A	H	A	H	A	H	A	H	H	A	H	A	H	A	H	H	A	H	A
Result	W	D	L	L	D	D	L	D	D	L	L	W	W	L	D	L	D	D	W	D	D	D	W	D	D	L	W	W	W	D	L	L	D	D	D	W	D	D	W	L	W	D
Position	8	6	11	15	17	16	17	18	19	19	21	20	16	19	17	19	19	19	18	16	16	16	16	16	15	17	17	15	14	13	15	15	15	15	15	15	15	16	14	15	15	14

Updated to match(es) played on 20 July 2020. Source: La Liga SmartBank
A = Away; H = Home; W = Win; D = Draw; L = Loss

==== Matches ====
The fixtures were revealed on 4 July 2019.

17 August 2019 1	Racing Santander	0–1	Málaga	Santander
18:00 CEST (UTC+2)	Mario Ortiz (yellow card) 41' (yellow-red card) 90'; Buñuel (yellow card) 50'	Report	Boulahroud (yellow card) 40'; Adrián 85', (yellow card) 86'	Stadium: El Sardinero; Attendance: 12,515; Referee: Aitor Gorostegui Fernández

24 August 2019 2	Málaga	1–1	Las Palmas	Málaga
21:00 CEST (UTC+2)	Diego González (yellow card) 46'; Adrián 80' (pen.)		Pedri (yellow card) 45'; Kirian Rodríguez (yellow card) 48'; Castro 49'; Curbelo (yellow card) 51'; Timor (yellow card) 65'	Stadium: La Rosaleda Stadium; Attendance: 17,691; Referee: Gorka Sagues

1 September 2019 3	Girona	1–0	Málaga	Girona
19:00 CEST (UTC+2)	Stuani 30'	Report		Stadium: Montilivi; Referee: Juan Luis Pulido Santana

7 September 2019 4	Málaga	0–1	Almería	Málaga
18:00 CEST (UTC+2)	Rolón (yellow card) 19'; Boulahroud (yellow card) 82'; Sergio Ruiz (yellow card) 90+3'; Juankar (yellow card) 90+1'; Adrián (yellow card) 90+4'		Sekou 9'; Aguza (yellow card) 20'; Fernando (yellow card) 51'; Vada (yellow card) 74'; Martos (yellow card) 90'	Stadium: La Rosaleda; Attendance: 18,068; Referee: Rubén Ávalos Barrera

14 September 2019 5	Mirandés	1–1	Málaga	Miranda de Ebro
16:00 CEST (UTC+2)				Stadium: Anduva

17 September 2019 6	Málaga	1–1	Rayo Vallecano	Málaga
19:00 CEST (UTC+2)		Report		Stadium: La Rosaleda

29 September 2019 8	Málaga	0–0	Real Sporting	Málaga
12:00 CEST (UTC+2)	Bare (yellow card) 87'; Luis Muñoz (yellow card) 91'	Report	Méndez (yellow card) 26'	Stadium: La Rosaleda; Attendance: 15,272; Referee: Arcediano Monescillo

3 October 2019 9	Real Zaragoza	2–2	Málaga	Zaragoza
19:00 CEST (UTC+2)	Suárez 42'; Ros (yellow card) 60'; Soro (yellow card) 75'; Guti 90'	Report	Sadiku 3'; Juankar (yellow card) 18'; Lombán (yellow card) 24', (goal) 89'; Ismael (yellow card) 61'; Benkhemassa (yellow card) 82'	Stadium: La Romareda; Attendance: 22,927; Referee: Daniel Ocón Arráiz

6 October 2019 10	Huesca	2–0	Málaga	Huesca
20:00 CEST (UTC+2)		Report		Stadium: El Alcoraz

12 October 2019 11	Málaga	1–2	Cádiz	Málaga
18:00 CEST (UTC+2)	Antoñín 84'	Report	Lozano 32'; Caye Quintana 73'	Stadium: La Rosaleda; Attendance: 17,765; Referee: Rubén Ávalos Barrera

20 October 2019 12	Deportivo La Coruña	0–2	Málaga	A Coruña
16:00 CEST (UTC+2)				Stadium: Abanca-Riazor

1 November 2019 14	Ponferradina	1–0	Málaga	Ponferrada
18:30 CET (UTC+1)				Stadium: Estadio El Toralín

10 November 2019 15	Málaga	0–0	Fuenlabrada	Málaga
18:00 CET (UTC+1)		Report		Stadium: La Rosaleda

17 November 2019 16	Alcorcón	1–0	Málaga	Alcorcón
14:00 CET (UTC+1)				Stadium: Santo Domingo

24 November 2019 17	Málaga	3–3	Elche	Málaga
16:00 CET (UTC+1)	Pacheco (yellow card) 12', (goal) 39'; Luis Muñoz (yellow card) 17'; Mohamedi (yellow card) 21'; Luis Hernández (yellow card) 57'; Sadiku 79' (pen.); Antoñín 81'		Fidel 23' (pen.), 28'; Villar (yellow card) 26', (goal) 64'; Juan Cruz (yellow card) 41'; Medina (yellow card) 62'; Manuel Sánchez (yellow card) 64'; Óscar Gil (yellow card) 74'; Milla (yellow card) 82'	Stadium: La Rosaleda Stadium; Attendance: 14,040; Referee: Álvaro Moreno

29 November 2019 18	Numancia	0–0	Málaga	Soria
21:00 CET (UTC+1)		Report		Stadium: Los Pajaritos

6 December 2019 19	Málaga	2–0	Tenerife	Málaga
21:00 CET (UTC+1)		Report		Stadium: La Rosaleda Stadium

15 December 2019 20	Extremadura	0–0	Málaga	Almendralejo
CET (UTC+1)				Stadium: Francisco de la Hera

21 December 2019 21	Málaga	1–1	Lugo	Málaga
16:00 CET (UTC+1)				Stadium: La Rosaleda

14 January 2020 23	Málaga	1–0	Ponferradina	Málaga
20:00 CET (UTC+1)				Stadium: La Rosaleda

17 January 2020 24	Fuenlabrada	0–0	Málaga	Fuenlabrada
21:00 CET (UTC+1)		Report		Stadium: Fernando Torres

26 January 2020 25	Málaga	2–2	Mirandés	Málaga
12:00 CET (UTC+1)				Stadium: La Rosaleda

1 February 2020 26	Elche	2–0	Málaga	Elche
21:00 CET (UTC+1)	Milla 29'; Mfulu (yellow card) 60'; Verdú (yellow card) 71'; Escriche 79'		Cifu (yellow card) 45+1'; Adrián (yellow card) 65'	Stadium: Estadio Manuel Martínez Valero; Attendance: 9,988; Referee: Gorka Sagues

9 February 2020 27	Málaga	2–1	Numancia	Málaga
20:30 CET (UTC+1)		Report		Stadium: La Rosaleda

16 February 2020 28	Cádiz	0–1	Málaga	Cádiz
16:00 CET (UTC+1)		Report	Adrián González 51'	Stadium: Estadio Ramón de Carranza; Attendance: 18,433; Referee: Juan Luis Pulido Santana

23 February 2020 29	Málaga	2–0	Racing Santander	Soria
18:15 CET (UTC+1)	Tete 29'; Lombán 39'	Report		Stadium: Los Pajaritos; Attendance: 24,873; Referee: Óliver de la Fuente Ramos

8 March 2020 31	Málaga	0–1	Real Zaragoza	Málaga
16:00 CET (UTC+1)	Muñoz (yellow card) 35'; Tete (yellow card) 42'	Report	Eguaras (yellow card) 50'; Burgui (yellow card) 73'; Atienza (yellow card) 78'; Suárez 86'	Stadium: La Rosaleda; Attendance: 22,264; Referee: Dámaso Arcediano Monescillo

12 June 2020 32	Málaga	1–3	Huesca	Málaga
19:30 CEST (UTC+2)		Report		Stadium: La Rosaleda; Attendance: 0

15 June 2020 33	Tenerife	0–0	Málaga	Santa Cruz de Tenerife
21:30 CEST (UTC+2)		Report		Stadium: Heliodoro Rodríguez López

20 June 2020 34	Málaga	1–1	Extremadura	Málaga
CEST (UTC+2)				Stadium: La Rosaleda

23 June 2020 35	Lugo	0–0	Málaga	Lugo
19:30 CEST (UTC+2)				Stadium: Anxo Carro

28 June 2020 36	Málaga	2–0	Girona	Málaga
19:30 CEST (UTC+2)	Cifu 20', (yellow card) 82'; González (yellow card) 43'; Sadiku 50', (yellow card) 84'; Bare (yellow card) 53'; Adrián (red card) 74'; Buenacasa (yellow card) 90+2'; Benkhemassa (yellow card) 90+4'	Report	Rivera (red card) 22'; Granell (yellow card) 43'; Juanpe (yellow card) 86'	Stadium: La Rosaleda; Attendance: 0 Referee: Alejandro Muñiz Ruiz

2 July 2020 37	Rayo Vallecano	0–0	Málaga	Madrid
21:45 CEST (UTC+2)	Saveljich (yellow card) 19'; Valentín (yellow card) 29'; Luna (yellow card) 37'	Report	Juande (yellow card) 32'; Lombán (yellow card) 41'; Tete (yellow card) 65'; Juankar (yellow card) 81'	Stadium: Vallecas; Attendance: 0 Referee: Daniel Jesús Trujillo Suárez

5 July 2020 38	Málaga	0–0	Albacete	Málaga
19:30 CEST (UTC+2)				Stadium: La Rosaleda Stadium; Attendance: 0 Referee: Iñaki Bikandi Garrido

8 July 2020 39	Málaga	1–0	Deportivo La Coruña	Málaga
19:30 CEST (UTC+2)	Benkhemassa (yellow card) 38'; Boussefiane 61'	Report	Shibasaki (yellow card) 23'; Mollejo (yellow card) 63'; Santos (yellow card) 71'; Mujaid (yellow card) 72'	Stadium: La Rosaleda; Attendance: 0 Referee: José Antonio López Toca

17 July 2020 41	Málaga	2–0	Alcorcón	Málaga
21:00 CEST (UTC+2)	Juanpi 22'; Tete 79'	Report	Sandaza (yellow card) 65'; Bellvís (yellow card) 72'; Stoichkov (yellow card) 81'; Diéguez (yellow card) 86'	Stadium: La Rosaleda; Attendance: 0 Referee: Santiago Varón Aceitón

20 July 2020 42	Almería	0–0	Málaga	Almería
21:00 CEST (UTC+2)	Callejón (yellow card) 58'	Report	Cifu (yellow card) 53'; Casas (yellow card) 60'	Stadium: Juegos Mediterráneos; Attendance: 0 Referee: Saúl Ais Reig

=== Copa del Rey ===
==== First round ====
17 December 2019	Escobedo	2–0	Málaga	Camargo
20:30	Montiel (yellow card) 45+1'; Bubú (yellow card) 36'; Gutiérrez 52'; Álvarez (yellow card) 70'; Leite 84'	Report	Juankar (yellow card) 40'	Stadium: Eusebio Arce; Attendance: 2,000; Referee: Jon Ander González Esteban

== Statistics ==
=== Appearances and goals ===
Last updated on 20 July 2020.

No.	Pos	Nat	Player	Total		Segunda División		Copa del Rey	
No.	Pos	Nat	Player	Apps	Goals	Apps	Goals	Apps	Goals
Goalkeepers
1	GK	(Morocco) MAR	Munir	38	0	38	0	0	0
36	GK	(Spain) ESP	Kellyan	2	0	2	0	0	0
37	GK	(Argentina) ARG	Gonzalo	3	0	2	0	1	0
Defenders
3	DF	(Spain) ESP	Diego González	33	0	25+7	0	1	0
4	DF	(Spain) ESP	Luis Hernández	29	0	28+1	0	0	0
5	DF	(Spain) ESP	David Lombán	27	3	26+1	3	0	0
12	DF	(Spain) ESP	Cifu	35	2	32+2	2	0+1	0
15	DF	(Venezuela) VEN	Mikel Villanueva	17	1	14+2	1	0+1	0
26	DF	(Spain) ESP	Cristo	5	0	3+2	0	0	0
28	DF	(Spain) ESP	Ismael	13	0	11+1	0	1	0
29	DF	(Spain) ESP	Juande	9	0	9	0	0	0
34	DF	(Spain) ESP	Luis Muñoz	27	0	24+2	0	1	0
Midfielders
6	MF	(Morocco) MAR	Badr Boulahroud	20	0	9+10	0	1	0
7	MF	(Spain) ESP	Juankar	37	0	33+3	0	1	0
8	MF	(Spain) ESP	Adrián	32	6	29+3	6	0	0
14	MF	(Argentina) ARG	Esteban Rolón	8	0	3+4	0	1	0
16	MF	(Venezuela) VEN	Juanpi	35	1	27+7	1	1	0
24	FW	(Algeria) ALG	Mohamed Benkhemassa	20	0	9+10	0	1	0
30	FW	(Spain) ESP	Ramón	4	0	2+2	0	0	0
33	MF	(Spain) ESP	Iván Jaime	3	0	0+3	0	0	0
35	MF	(Albania) ALB	Keidi Bare	30	1	26+4	1	0	0
Forwards
9	FW	(Albania) ALB	Armando Sadiku	37	13	33+3	13	0+1	0
10	FW	(Spain) ESP	Tete Morente	15	2	13+2	2	0	0
11	FW	(Portugal) POR	Renato Santos	33	0	16+16	0	1	0
17	FW	(Spain) ESP	Sergio Buenacasa	14	0	2+12	0	0	0
22	FW	(Spain) ESP	Dani Pacheco	22	1	14+8	1	0	0
31	FW	(Morocco) MAR	Hicham	20	1	10+10	1	0	0
40	FW	(Spain) ESP	Julio	3	0	0+2	0	1	0
Players who have made an appearance or had a squad number this season but have left the club
10	FW	(Switzerland) SUI	Lorenzo González	6	0	1+5	0	0	0
20	MF	(Spain) ESP	Keko	7	0	3+4	0	0	0
27	MF	(Spain) ESP	Hugo	5	0	2+3	0	0	0
38	FW	(Spain) ESP	Antoñín	22	4	16+6	4	0	0
