= 2019–20 Real Zaragoza season =

Real Zaragoza
2019–20 season
- President: Christian Lapetra
- Head coach: Víctor Fernández
- Stadium: La Romareda
- Segunda División: 3rd
- Copa del Rey: Round of 16
- Top goalscorer: League: Luis Suárez (18); All: Luis Suárez (18)
| Home colours | Away colours |

The 2019–20 season was Real Zaragoza's sixth consecutive season in the Segunda División and their 88th year in existence. Along with Segunda División, the club competed in the Copa del Rey. The season was due to cover a period from 1 July 2019 to 30 June 2020. It was extended extraordinarily beyond 30 June due to the COVID-19 pandemic in Spain.

== Players ==
=== First-team squad ===
As of 14 February 2020

Note: Flags indicate national team as defined under FIFA eligibility rules; some limited exceptions apply. Players may hold more than one non-FIFA nationality.

| No. | Pos. | Nation | Player |
|---|---|---|---|
| 1 | GK | ARG | Cristian Álvarez |
| 2 | DF | ESP | Carlos Vigaray |
| 3 | MF | COL | Dani Torres |
| 5 | DF | MAR | Jawad El Yamiq (on loan from Genoa) |
| 6 | DF | ESP | Alberto Guitián |
| 7 | FW | ESP | Miguel Linares |
| 8 | FW | POR | André Pereira (on loan from Porto) |
| 9 | MF | ESP | Alberto Soro (on loan from Real Madrid) |
| 10 | MF | ESP | Javi Ros |
| 11 | FW | ESP | Javi Puado (on loan from Espanyol) |
| 12 | MF | NGR | James Igbekeme |
| 13 | GK | ESP | Álvaro Ratón |

| No. | Pos. | Nation | Player |
|---|---|---|---|
| 14 | MF | ESP | Raúl Guti |
| 15 | FW | ESP | Álex Blanco (on loan from Valencia) |
| 16 | MF | ESP | Íñigo Eguaras |
| 17 | DF | ESP | Carlos Nieto |
| 18 | DF | ESP | Pichu Atienza |
| 20 | FW | ESP | Burgui (on loan from Alavés) |
| 21 | MF | ESP | Alberto Zapater (captain) |
| 22 | DF | ESP | Julián Delmás |
| 23 | MF | JPN | Shinji Kagawa |
| 26 | FW | COL | Luis Suárez (on loan from Watford) |
| 27 | DF | ESP | Enrique Clemente |

=== Out on loan ===
Note: Flags indicate national team as defined under FIFA eligibility rules; some limited exceptions apply. Players may hold more than one non-FIFA nationality.

| No. | Pos. | Nation | Player |
|---|---|---|---|
| — | GK | SRB | Uroš Matić (on loan to Teruel until 30 June 2020) |
| — | DF | ESP | Eduardo Mingotes (on loan to Cornellà until 30 June 2020) |
| — | MF | GEO | Giorgi Papunashvili (on loan to Racing until 30 June 2020) |
| — | DF | ESP | Daniel Lasure (on loan to Tenerife until 30 June 2020) |

| No. | Pos. | Nation | Player |
|---|---|---|---|
| — | MF | GEQ | Federico Bikoro (on loan to Badajoz until 30 June 2020) |
| — | MF | ESP | Jorge Pombo (on loan to Cádiz until 30 June 2020) |
| — | FW | BRA | Raí (on loan to Ibiza until 30 June 2020) |

== Pre-season and friendlies ==
Win Draw Loss

Real Zaragoza announced six pre-season friendlies against Peña Ferranca, Club Deportivo Ebro, Calahorra, Gimnàstic de Tarragona, Deportivo Alavés, and Tudelano.

| 19 July 2019 Friendly | Zaragoza | 13–0 | Peña Ferranca |

| 27 July 2019 Friendly | Zaragoza | 3–0 | Ebro |

| 31 July 2019 Friendly | Calahorra | 0–4 | Zaragoza |

| 3 August 2019 Friendly | Gimnàstic de Tarragona | 2–3 | Zaragoza | Tarragona, Spain |
| 20:30 CEST (UTC+2) | | Report | | Stadium: Nou Estadi |

| 7 August 2019 Friendly | Zaragoza | 0–0 | Deportivo Alavés | Zaragoza, Spain |
| 20:30 CEST (UTC+2) | | Report | | Stadium: La Romareda; Attendance: 10,766; Referee: Daniel Ocón Arraiz |

| 10 August 2019 Friendly | Tudelano | 1–0 | Zaragoza | Tudela, Spain |
| 19:00 CEST (UTC+2) | Soto 22' | Report | | Stadium: Estadio Ciudad de Tudela; Referee: Julio Ollo Leo |

== Competitions ==
=== Overview ===
| Competition | First match | Last match | Starting round | Final position | Record | | | | | | | |
| Competition | First match | Last match | Starting round | Final position | Pld | W | D | L | GF | GA | GD | Win % |
|---|---|---|---|---|---|---|---|---|---|---|---|---|
| Segunda División | 17 August 2019 | 20 July 2020 | Matchday 1 | 3rd | 42 | 18 | 11 | 13 | 59 | 53 | +6 | 42.86 |
| Segunda División promotion play-offs | 13 August 2020 | 16 August 2020 | Semi-finals | Semi-finals | 2 | 0 | 1 | 1 | 0 | 1 | −1 | 0.00 |
| Copa del Rey | 17 December 2019 | 29 January 2020 | First round | Round of 16 | 4 | 3 | 0 | 1 | 7 | 6 | +1 | 75.00 |
| Total | | | | | 48 | 21 | 12 | 15 | 66 | 60 | +6 | 43.75 |

Last updated: 16 August 2020
Source: Soccerway

=== Segunda División ===
==== League table ====
| Pos | Team | Pld | W | D | L | GF | GA | GD | Pts | Promotion, qualification or relegation |
|---|---|---|---|---|---|---|---|---|---|---|
| 1 | Huesca (C, P) | 42 | 21 | 7 | 14 | 55 | 42 | +13 | 70 | Promotion to La Liga |
| 2 | Cádiz (P) | 42 | 19 | 12 | 11 | 50 | 39 | +11 | 69 | Promotion to La Liga |
| 3 | Zaragoza | 42 | 18 | 11 | 13 | 59 | 53 | +6 | 65 | Qualification to promotion play-offs |
| 4 | Almería | 42 | 17 | 13 | 12 | 62 | 43 | +19 | 64 | Qualification to promotion play-offs |
| 5 | Girona | 42 | 17 | 12 | 13 | 48 | 43 | +5 | 63 | Qualification to promotion play-offs |

Source: LaLiga Soccerway
Rules for classification: 1) points; 2) head-to-head points; 3) head-to-head goal difference; 4) goal difference; 5) number of goals scored
(C) Champions; (P) Promoted

==== Results summary ====
| Overall | | | | | | | | Home | | | | | | Away | | | | | |
| Pld | W | D | L | GF | GA | GD | Pts | W | D | L | GF | GA | GD | W | D | L | GF | GA | GD |
|---|---|---|---|---|---|---|---|---|---|---|---|---|---|---|---|---|---|---|---|
| 42 | 18 | 11 | 13 | 59 | 53 | +6 | 65 | 9 | 4 | 8 | 30 | 27 | +3 | 9 | 7 | 5 | 29 | 26 | +3 |

Last updated: 20 July 2020.
Source: La Liga SmartBank

==== Results by round ====
| Round | 1 | 2 | 3 | 4 | 5 | 6 | 7 | 8 | 9 | 10 | 11 | 12 | 13 | 14 | 15 | 16 | 17 | 18 | 19 | 20 | 21 | 22 | 23 | 24 | 25 | 26 | 27 | 28 | 29 | 30 | 31 | 32 | 33 | 34 | 35 | 36 | 37 | 38 | 39 | 40 | 41 | 42 |
|---|---|---|---|---|---|---|---|---|---|---|---|---|---|---|---|---|---|---|---|---|---|---|---|---|---|---|---|---|---|---|---|---|---|---|---|---|---|---|---|---|---|---|
| Ground | H | A | H | A | H | H | A | H | H | A | A | H | A | H | A | H | A | H | H | A | H | A | H | A | H | A | H | A | H | A | H | A | H | H | A | H | A | H | A | H | A | H |
| Result | W | D | W | W | W | L | D | D | D | L | W | L | L | W | D | L | W | D | W | W | L | W | W | D | W | D | D | W | W | D | W | L | W | L | W | L | L | L | D | L | L | W |
| Position | 4 | 5 | 4 | 2 | 2 | 3 | 4 | 4 | 4 | 5 | 4 | 5 | 7 | 5 | 6 | 10 | 6 | 6 | 6 | 3 | 5 | 3 | 3 | 3 | 4 | 3 | 3 | 2 | 2 | 2 | 2 | 2 | 2 | 2 | 2 | 2 | 3 | 3 | 3 | 4 | 5 | 3 |

Updated to match(es) played on 20 July 2020. Source: La Liga SmartBank
A = Away; H = Home; W = Win; D = Draw; L = Loss

==== Matches ====
The fixtures were revealed on 4 July 2019.

| 17 August 2019 1 | Zaragoza | 2–0 | Tenerife | Zaragoza |
| 21:00 CEST (UTC+2) | Suárez 41', (yellow card) 44'; Ros 88' (pen.) | Report | Naranjo (yellow card) 25'; Ruiz (yellow card) 73' (yellow-red card) 83' | Stadium: La Romareda; Attendance: 17,468; Referee: Dámaso Arcediano Monescillo |

| 25 August 2019 2 | Ponferradina | 1–1 | Zaragoza | Ponferrada |
| 18:00 CEST (UTC+2) | Sielva (yellow card) 63'; Valcarce (yellow card) 84', (goal) 86' | Report | Kagawa 59'; Grippo (yellow card) 74' | Stadium: Estadio El Toralín; Attendance: 5,684; Referee: Javier Iglesias Villanueva |

| 30 August 2019 3 | Zaragoza | 1–0 | Elche | Zaragoza |
| 21:00 CEST (UTC+2) | Nieto (yellow card) 19'; Igbekeme (yellow card) 25'; Suárez (yellow card) 77', (goal) 87' (pen.); Guti (yellow card) 90+5' | Report | I. Sánchez (yellow card) 32' | Stadium: La Romareda; Attendance: 22,767; Referee: Víctor Areces Franco |

| 8 September 2019 4 | Alcorcón | 0–3 | Zaragoza | Alcorcón |
| 18:30 CEST (UTC+2) | Romera (yellow card) 16' | Report | Dwamena 12'; Suárez 42'; Grippo (yellow card) 52'; Kagawa (yellow card) 89'; Vigaray 90' | Stadium: Santo Domingo; Attendance: 3,436; Referee: Óliver de la Fuente Ramos |

| 15 September 2019 5 | Zaragoza | 3–1 | Extremadura | Zaragoza |
| 18:00 CEST (UTC+2) | Dwamena 12'; Kagawa 80'; Suárez 86' | Report | Caballo 54' | Stadium: La Romareda; Attendance: 25,799; Referee: Jon Ander González Esteban |

| 21 September 2019 7 | Zaragoza | 0–0 | Lugo | Zaragoza |
| 18:00 CEST (UTC+2) | | Report | | Stadium: La Romareda; Attendance: 24,721; Referee: Víctor Areces Franco |

| 29 September 2019 8 | Real Oviedo | 2–2 | Zaragoza | Oviedo |
| 18:30 CEST (UTC+2) | Ortuño 2', 55' (pen.) | Report | Suárez 37' (pen.), 66' | Stadium: Carlos Tartiere; Attendance: 12,627; Referee: Isidro Díaz de Mera Escuderos |

| 3 October 2019 9 | Zaragoza | 2–2 | Málaga | Zaragoza |
| 19:00 CEST (UTC+2) | Suárez 42'; Ros (yellow card) 60'; Soro (yellow card) 75'; Guti 90' | Report | Sadiku 3'; Juankar (yellow card) 18'; Lombán (yellow card) 24', (goal) 89'; Ismael (yellow card) 61'; Benkhemassa (yellow card) 82' | Stadium: La Romareda; Attendance: 22,927; Referee: Daniel Ocón Arráiz |

| 6 October 2019 10 | Zaragoza | 0–2 | Cádiz | Zaragoza |
| 16:00 CEST (UTC+2) | | Report | Lozano 57'; Nano 80' | Stadium: La Romareda; Attendance: 26,923; Referee: Óliver de la Fuente Ramos |

| 13 October 2019 11 | Numancia | 0–1 | Zaragoza | Soria |
| 16:00 CEST (UTC+2) | | Report | Eguaras (yellow card) 48', (goal) 81'; Clemente (yellow card) 53'; Blanco (yellow card) 90+4' | Stadium: Los Pajaritos; Attendance: 5,734; Referee: José Antonio López Toca |

| 16 October 2019 6 | Fuenlabrada | 2–1 | Zaragoza | Fuenlabrada |
| 21:00 CEST (UTC+2) | Fraile 35'; Salvador 67'; Clavería (yellow card) 82'; Martínez (yellow card) 90'; Chico (yellow card) 90+6' | Report | Papu (yellow card) 25'; Grippo (yellow card) 34'; Ros 61' (pen.); Álvarez (yellow card) 88'; Pombo (yellow card) 90+2'; Atienza (yellow card) 90+5' | Stadium: Estadio Fernando Torres; Attendance: 5,214; Referee: Luis Mario Milla Alvendiz |
Note: Match postponed from 17–19 September.

| 20 October 2019 12 | Zaragoza | 1–2 | Mirandés | Zaragoza |
| 21:00 CEST (UTC+2) | Suárez (yellow card) 46'; Soro 74'; Linares (yellow card) 79' | Report | Marcos André 22', (yellow card) 43'; Peña 61' | Stadium: La Romareda; Attendance: 18,897; Referee: Daniel Jesús Trujillo Suárez |

| 27 October 2019 13 | Sporting Gijón | 4–0 | Zaragoza | Gijón |
| 16:00 CET (UTC+1) | Cerro 3'; García 38', 76'; Vázquez 87' | Report | | Stadium: El Molinón; Attendance: 19,204; Referee: Jorge Figueroa Vázquez |

| 3 November 2019 14 | Zaragoza | 3–0 | Las Palmas | Zaragoza |
| 18:30 CET (UTC+1) | Suárez 4', 64', (yellow card) 45'; Nieto 13'; Ratón (yellow card) 78' | Report | Lemos (yellow card) 22' (yellow-red card) 88'; Fabio (yellow card) 55'; Aythami (yellow card) 63'; Kirian (yellow card) 78' | Stadium: La Romareda; Attendance: 22,708; Referee: Isidro Díaz de Mera Escuderos |

| 10 November 2019 15 | Almería | 1–1 | Zaragoza | Almería |
| 16:00 CET (UTC+1) | Lazo (yellow card) 16'; Martos (yellow card) 26'; Petrović (yellow card) 35'; Núñez 45'; Jonathan (yellow card) 83' | Report | Igbekeme (yellow card) 44'; Linares 65'; Nieto (yellow card) 68'; Guti (yellow card) 87' | Stadium: Estadio de los Juegos Mediterráneos; Attendance: 10,441; Referee: Rubén Ávalos Barrera |

| 16 November 2019 16 | Zaragoza | 0–1 | Albacete | Zaragoza |
| 21:00 CET (UTC+1) | Guitián (yellow card) 33' | Report | Azamoum (yellow card) 25'; Capezzi (yellow card) 66'; Eddy 90+4' | Stadium: La Romareda; Attendance: 20,036; Referee: Saúl Ais Reig |

| 23 November 2019 17 | Rayo Vallecano | 0–1 | Zaragoza | Madrid |
| 16:00 CET (UTC+1) | Dimitrievski (yellow card) 61'; Pascual (yellow card) 63' | Report | Eguaras (yellow card) 40'; Ros 63' (pen.), (yellow card) 73'; Puado (yellow card) 71'; Guti (yellow card) 90+3' | Stadium: Vallecas; Attendance: 9,743; Referee: Óliver de la Fuente Ramos |

| 30 November 2019 18 | Zaragoza | 3–3 | Girona | Zaragoza |
| 21:00 CET (UTC+1) | Suárez (yellow card) 30', (goal) 38', 80' (pen.); Puado 50'; Guti (yellow card) 82' | Report | García 20', 28'; Granell (yellow card) 26'; Gallar (yellow card) 33'; Stuani 87' (pen.); Alcalá (yellow card) 90+2' | Stadium: La Romareda; Attendance: 19,382; Referee: Miguel Ángel Ortiz Arias |

| 8 December 2019 19 | Deportivo La Coruña | 1–3 | Zaragoza | A Coruña |
| 16:00 CET (UTC+1) | Gómez (yellow card) 5'; Valle 48' | Report | Guitián 33'; Puado 39'; Suárez (yellow card) 72', (goal) 80'; Kagawa (yellow card) 84' | Stadium: Abanca-Riazor; Attendance: 13,604; Referee: Iosu Galech Apezteguía |

| 14 December 2019 20 | Zaragoza | 2–0 | Racing Santander | Zaragoza |
| 21:00 CET (UTC+1) | Suárez 19', (yellow card) 64'; Nieto (yellow card) 66'; Ros 90+4' | Report | Alexis (yellow card) 36'; Toribio (yellow card) 42'; Barral (yellow card) 79'; Olaortua (yellow card) 90+1' | Stadium: La Romareda; Attendance: 22,480; Referee: Juan Luis Pulido Santana |

| 22 December 2019 21 | Huesca | 2–1 | Zaragoza | Huesca |
| 16:00 CET (UTC+1) | Okazaki 20'; Pulido (yellow card) 27'; Ferreiro (yellow card) 45'; Luisinho (yellow card) 47'; Josué Sá 69' | Report | Soro 46'; Igbekeme (yellow card) 59'; Suárez (yellow card) 61'; Guitián (yellow card) 67' (red card) 82'; Delmás (red card) 76'; Guti (yellow card) 89' | Stadium: El Alcoraz; Attendance: 7,202; Referee: Isidro Díaz de Mera Escuderos |

| 7 January 2020 22 | Zaragoza | 2–0 | Sporting Gijón | Zaragoza |
| 21:00 CET (UTC+1) | Guti 2'; Suárez 59'; Igbekeme (yellow card) 78'; Ros (yellow card) 86' | Report | Cordero (yellow card) 27'; Cerro (yellow card) 76'; Molinero (red card) 90+1' | Stadium: La Romareda; Attendance: 10,798; Referee: Álvaro Moreno Aragón |

| 14 January 2020 23 | Las Palmas | 0–1 | Zaragoza | Las Palmas |
| 21:30 CET (UTC+1) | Benito (yellow card) 39'; Aythami (yellow card) 81'; Rodríguez (yellow card) 86' | Report | Ros 83' (pen.) | Stadium: Estadio Gran Canaria; Attendance: 9,358; Referee: Iñaki Vicandi Garrido |

| 25 January 2020 25 | Zaragoza | 1–0 | Numancia | Zaragoza |
| 21:00 CET (UTC+1) | Guitián (yellow card) 24'; Vigaray (yellow card) 48'; Soro (yellow card) 58'; Puado 70', (yellow card) 84' | Report | Escassi (yellow card) 53' | Stadium: La Romareda; Attendance: 22,658; Referee: Daniel Jesús Trujillo Suárez |

| 2 February 2020 26 | Cádiz | 1–1 | Zaragoza | Cádiz |
| 16:00 CET (UTC+1) | Cala (yellow card) 4'; Lozano (yellow card) 31'; Fali (yellow card) 38'; Álex 84' (pen.) | Report | Soro 46'; Guti (yellow card) 54'; Nieto (yellow card) 55' | Stadium: Estadio Ramón de Carranza; Attendance: 17,961; Referee: Miguel Ángel Ortiz Arias |

| 8 February 2020 27 | Zaragoza | 0–0 | Fuenlabrada | Zaragoza |
| 21:00 CET (UTC+1) | El Yamiq (yellow card) 60'; Blanco (yellow card) 67'; Soro (yellow card) 88' | Report | José Fran (yellow card) 68'; Quintana (yellow card) 76'; Iribas (yellow card) 90+2' | Stadium: La Romareda; Attendance: 23,344; Referee: Rubén Ávalos Barrera |

| 15 February 2020 28 | Elche | 1–2 | Zaragoza | Elche |
| 21:00 CET (UTC+1) | Milla 18'; Gil (yellow card) 71'; Escriche (yellow card) 84'; Cruz (yellow card) 90+3' | Report | Soro 13'; Suárez 26', (yellow card) 61'; Atienza (yellow card) 52' | Stadium: Estadio Manuel Martínez Valero; Attendance: 11,338; Referee: Daniel Ocón Arráiz |

| 19 February 2020 24 | Mirandés | 1–1 | Zaragoza | Miranda de Ebro |
| 21:00 CET (UTC+1) | González (yellow card) 43'; Matheus 48'; Kijera (yellow card) 55'; Sánchez (yellow card) 75'; Peña (yellow card) 77'; Malsa (yellow card) 79' | Report | Puado (yellow card) 27'; Igbekeme 36'; Vigaray (yellow card) 42'; Nieto (yellow card) 81' | Stadium: Estadio de Anduva; Attendance: 3,434; Referee: Gorka Sagués Oscoz |

| 23 February 2020 29 | Zaragoza | 3–1 | Deportivo La Coruña | Zaragoza |
| 16:00 CET (UTC+1) | Eguaras 6'; Clemente (yellow card) 14'; Atienza 32'; Suárez 62'; El Yamiq (yellow card) 67' | Report | Mollejo 12', (yellow card) 55'; Shibasaki (yellow card) 22' (yellow-red card) 60'; Mujaid (yellow card) 84'; Aketxe (yellow card) 86' | Stadium: La Romareda; Attendance: 28,098; Referee: José Antonio López Toca |

| 29 February 2020 30 | Racing Santander | 2–2 | Zaragoza | Santander |
| 21:00 CET (UTC+1) | Figueras (yellow card) 51'; Cejudo 57'; Rodríguez 77' (pen.); Minero (yellow card) 82' (yellow-red card) 88' | Report | Guti (yellow card) 60' (yellow-red card) 90+4', (goal) 62'; El Yamiq (yellow card) 70'; Álvarez (yellow card) 75'; Blanco 90' | Stadium: Campos de Sport de El Sardinero; Attendance: 11,263; Referee: Aitor Gorostegui Fernández-Ortega |

| 8 March 2020 31 | Málaga | 0–1 | Zaragoza | Málaga |
| 16:00 CET (UTC+1) | Muñoz (yellow card) 35'; Tete (yellow card) 42' | Report | Eguaras (yellow card) 50'; Burgui (yellow card) 73'; Atienza (yellow card) 78'; Suárez 86' | Stadium: La Rosaleda; Attendance: 22,264; Referee: Dámaso Arcediano Monescillo |

| 13 June 2020 32 | Zaragoza | 1–3 | Alcorcón | Zaragoza |
| 21:30 CEST (UTC+2) | Guitián (yellow card) 12'; Álvarez (red card) 78'; Linares 90+3' | Report | Dorca (yellow card) 36'; Stoichkov 71', 74'; Sandaza 84' | Stadium: La Romareda; Attendance: 0 Referee: Juan Luis Pulido Santana |
Note: The match was originally scheduled for 15 March, but was postponed due to the COVID-19 pandemic, and rescheduled to 13 June. It was played behind closed doors.

| 16 June 2020 33 | Lugo | 1–3 | Zaragoza | Lugo |
| 19:30 CEST (UTC+2) | Hacen (red card) 77'; Josete 90+2' | Report | Kagawa 19'; Guti 64'; Linares 86' | Stadium: Estadio Anxo Carro; Attendance: 0 Referee: Víctor Areces Franco |
Note: The match was originally scheduled for 22 March, but was postponed due to the 2020 coronavirus pandemic, and rescheduled to 16 June. It was played behind closed doors.

| 20 June 2020 34 | Zaragoza | 0–2 | Almería | Zaragoza |
| 19:30 CEST (UTC+2) | El Yamiq (yellow card) 2'; Francés (yellow card) 13'; Blanco (yellow card) 79'; Delmás (yellow card) 90+3' | Report | Appiah 12'; Costas (yellow card) 24'; Martos (yellow card) 66'; Villalba 69' | Stadium: La Romareda; Attendance: 0 Referee: Saúl Ais Reig |
Note: The match was originally scheduled for 29 March, but was postponed due to the 2020 coronavirus pandemic, and rescheduled to 20 June. It was played behind closed doors.

| 23 June 2020 35 | Extremadura | 1–2 | Zaragoza | Almendralejo |
| 19:30 CEST (UTC+2) | Alegría 8'; Nono (yellow card) 29' (yellow-red card) 86'; Zarfino (yellow card) 89' | Report | Guti 24'; Suárez 53'; Kagawa (yellow card) 88'; Zapater (yellow card) 90+5' | Stadium: Estadio Francisco de la Hera; Attendance: 0 Referee: Óliver de la Fuente Ramos |
Note: The match was originally scheduled for 5 April, but was postponed due to the 2020 coronavirus pandemic. and rescheduled to 23 June. It was played behind closed doors.

| 29 June 2020 36 | Zaragoza | 0–1 | Huesca | Zaragoza |
| 21:45 CEST (UTC+2) | Guti (yellow card) 21'; Torres (yellow card) 65'; Linares (yellow card) 90+6'; Eguaras (yellow card) 90+6'; El Yamiq (yellow card) 90+7' | Report | Rico (yellow card) 5'; Juan Carlos (yellow card) 40'; Pulido (yellow card) 81'; Galán 90+5' | Stadium: La Romareda; Attendance: 0 Referee: Isidro Díaz de Mera Escuderos |
Note: The match was originally scheduled for 12 April, but was postponed due to the 2020 coronavirus pandemic, and rescheduled to 29 June. It was played behind closed doors.

| 3 July 2020 37 | Girona | 1–0 | Zaragoza | Girona |
| 19:30 CEST (UTC+2) | Aday (yellow card) 6'; Miquel (yellow card) 8'; Stuani 57' (pen.); Gumbau (yellow card) 79'; Gallar (yellow card) 90+7' | Report | Torres (yellow card) 37'; Suárez (yellow card) 90+4' | Stadium: Estadi Montilivi; Attendance: 0 Referee: Luis Mario Milla Alvendiz |
Note: The match was originally scheduled for 19 April, but was postponed due to the 2020 coronavirus pandemic, and rescheduled to 3 July. It was played behind closed doors.

| 6 July 2020 38 | Zaragoza | 2–4 | Rayo Vallecano | Zaragoza |
| 21:45 CEST (UTC+2) | Atienza 5'; Puado 60'; Delmás (yellow card) 87'; Soro (yellow card) 89'; Eguaras (yellow card) 89'; Pereira (yellow card) 90+1' | Report | Saúl (yellow card) 25'; Suárez (yellow card) 34'; Villar 45+2', 51'; García 54'; Advíncula (yellow card) 64'; Trejo (yellow card) 90+3', (goal) 90+4' | Stadium: La Romareda; Attendance: 0 Referee: Daniel Ocón Arráiz |
Note: The match was originally scheduled for 26 April, but was postponed due to the 2020 coronavirus pandemic, and rescheduled to 6 July. It was played behind closed doors.

| 9 July 2020 39 | Tenerife | 1–1 | Zaragoza | Santa Cruz de Tenerife |
| 21:45 CEST (UTC+2) | Milla 15' (pen.); Joselu (yellow card) 63'; Šipčić (yellow card) 76' (yellow-red card) 89' | Report | Suárez 5', (yellow card) 90+3'; Zapater (yellow card) 33'; Soro (yellow card) 80'; Torres (yellow card) 90+3' | Stadium: Estadio Heliodoro Rodríguez López; Attendance: 0 Referee: Jorge Figueroa Vázquez |
Note: The match was originally scheduled for 3 May, but was postponed due to the 2020 coronavirus pandemic, and rescheduled to 9 July. It was played behind closed doors.

| 12 July 2020 40 | Zaragoza | 2–4 | Real Oviedo | Zaragoza |
| 21:45 CEST (UTC+2) | Guti (yellow card) 43'; Vigaray (yellow card) 57'; Puado (yellow card) 67'; Suárez (yellow card) 85'; Linares 90+4'; Kagawa 90+7' (pen.) | Report | Obeng 15'; Sangalli 45'; Bárcenas 79'; Ortuño 90+1' | Stadium: La Romareda; Attendance: 0 Referee: Gorka Sagués Oscoz |
Note: The match was originally scheduled for 10 May, but was postponed due to the 2020 coronavirus pandemic, and rescheduled to 12 July. It was played behind closed doors.

| 17 July 2020 41 | Albacete | 4–1 | Zaragoza | Albacete |
| 21:00 CEST (UTC+2) | Maikel 13' (pen.), (yellow card) 73'; Gorosito 22'; Ojeda 33', 46'; Acuña (yellow card) 80' | Report | Burgui 29' (pen.); Clemente (yellow card) 62'; Buyla (yellow card) 82' | Stadium: Estadio Carlos Belmonte; Attendance: 0 Referee: Aitor Gorostegui Fernández-Ortega |
Note: The match was originally scheduled for 17 May, but was postponed due to the 2020 coronavirus pandemic, and rescheduled to 17 July. It was played behind closed doors.

| 20 July 2020 42 | Zaragoza | 2–1 | Ponferradina | Zaragoza |
| 21:00 CEST (UTC+2) | Clemente (yellow card) 24'; Linares 35'; Blanco 66' | Report | Rodríguez 51' | Stadium: La Romareda; Attendance: 0 Referee: Dámaso Arcediano Monescillo |
Note: The match was originally scheduled for 24 May, but was postponed due to the 2020 coronavirus pandemic, and rescheduled to 20 July. It was played behind closed doors.

==== Play-offs ====
| 13 August 2020 SF First leg | Elche | 0–0 | Zaragoza | Elche |
| 22:00 CEST (UTC+2) | Jonathas (red card) 30'; Josema (yellow card) 71'; Fidel (yellow card) 87'; Gonzalo (yellow card) 90+4' | Report | Kagawa (yellow card) 44' | Stadium: Estadio Manuel Martínez Valero; Attendance: 0 Referee: Rubén Ávalos Barrera |

| 16 August 2020 SF Second leg | Zaragoza | 0–1 (0–1 agg.) | Elche | Zaragoza |
| 22:00 CEST (UTC+2) | Pereira (yellow card) 75' | Report | Manuel (yellow card) 6'; Fidel (yellow card) 22'; Nino 81' | Stadium: La Romareda; Attendance: 0 Referee: Jorge Figueroa Vázquez |

=== Copa del Rey ===
| 17 December 2019 First round | Socuéllamos | 0–1 | Zaragoza | Socuéllamos |
| 20:00 CET (UTC+1) | | Report | Papunashvili 35' | Stadium: Paquito Jiménez; Attendance: 2,500; Referee: Jorge Figueroa Vázquez |

| 11 January 2020 Second round | Gimnàstic | 1–3 | Zaragoza | Tarragona |
| 12:00 CET (UTC+1) | Ballesteros 70' | Report | Juan Rodríguez 7' (o.g.); Goldar 40' (o.g.); Papunashvili 86' | Stadium: Nou Estadi; Attendance: 3,681; Referee: Trujillo Suárez |

| 21 January 2020 Round of 32 | Zaragoza | 3–1 | Mallorca | Zaragoza |
| 19:00 CET (UTC+1) | Kagawa (yellow card) 8'; Grippo (yellow card) 8'; Atienza (yellow card) 9'; Ros (yellow card) 32'; Blanco 48'; Puado 54'; Linares 75' | Report | Sastre (yellow card) 27'; Pedraza (yellow card) 56'; Febas (yellow card) 62', (goal) 85'; Sedlar (yellow card) 68'; Alegría (yellow card) 89' | Stadium: La Romareda; Attendance: 6,000; Referee: Antonio Mateu Lahoz |

| 29 January 2020 Round of 16 | Zaragoza | 0–4 | Real Madrid | Zaragoza |
| 21:00 CET (UTC+1) | | Report | Varane 6'; Vázquez 32'; Vinícius 72'; Benzema 79' | Stadium: La Romareda; Attendance: 31,500; Referee: José Luis González González |

== Statistics ==
=== Appearances and goals ===
Last updated on 17 March 2020.

| No. | Pos | Nat | Player | Total | | Segunda División | | Copa del Rey | |
| No. | Pos | Nat | Player | Apps | Goals | Apps | Goals | Apps | Goals |
Goalkeepers
| 1 | GK | (Argentina) ARG | Cristian Álvarez | 24 | 0 | 24 | 0 | 0 | 0 |
| 13 | GK | (Spain) ESP | Álvaro Ratón | 12 | 0 | 7+1 | 0 | 4 | 0 |
Defenders
| 2 | DF | (Spain) ESP | Carlos Vigaray | 19 | 1 | 19 | 1 | 0 | 0 |
| 5 | DF | (Morocco) MAR | Jawad El Yamiq | 7 | 0 | 7 | 0 | 0 | 0 |
| 6 | DF | (Spain) ESP | Alberto Guitián | 15 | 1 | 12+1 | 1 | 2 | 0 |
| 17 | DF | (Spain) ESP | Carlos Nieto | 29 | 1 | 28+1 | 1 | 0 | 0 |
| 18 | DF | (Spain) ESP | Pichu Atienza | 23 | 1 | 21 | 1 | 2 | 0 |
| 22 | DF | (Spain) ESP | Julián Delmás | 16 | 0 | 11+2 | 0 | 3 | 0 |
| 27 | DF | (Spain) ESP | Enrique Clemente | 16 | 0 | 13 | 0 | 3 | 0 |
| 38 | DF | (Spain) ESP | Andrés Borge | 1 | 0 | 0 | 0 | 1 | 0 |
| 39 | DF | (Spain) ESP | Alejandro Francés | 2 | 0 | 0 | 0 | 1+1 | 0 |
Midfielders
| 3 | MF | (Colombia) COL | Daniel Torres | 4 | 0 | 0+4 | 0 | 0 | 0 |
| 8 | MF | (Portugal) POR | André Pereira | 3 | 0 | 0+2 | 0 | 1 | 0 |
| 9 | MF | (Spain) ESP | Alberto Soro | 27 | 4 | 19+5 | 4 | 1+2 | 0 |
| 10 | MF | (Spain) ESP | Javi Ros | 23 | 5 | 9+11 | 5 | 3 | 0 |
| 12 | MF | (Nigeria) NGR | James Igbekeme | 25 | 1 | 18+3 | 1 | 2+2 | 0 |
| 14 | MF | (Spain) ESP | Raúl Guti | 30 | 3 | 28 | 3 | 1+1 | 0 |
| 15 | MF | (Spain) ESP | Álex Blanco | 24 | 2 | 4+17 | 1 | 2+1 | 1 |
| 16 | MF | (Spain) ESP | Íñigo Eguaras | 29 | 2 | 27+1 | 2 | 1 | 0 |
| 20 | MF | (Spain) ESP | Burgui | 5 | 0 | 4+1 | 0 | 0 | 0 |
| 21 | MF | (Spain) ESP | Alberto Zapater | 0 | 0 | 0 | 0 | 0 | 0 |
| 23 | MF | (Japan) JPN | Shinji Kagawa | 26 | 2 | 18+5 | 2 | 3 | 0 |
| 30 | MF | (Equatorial Guinea) GEQ | Jannick Buyla | 1 | 0 | 0 | 0 | 1 | 0 |
| 33 | MF | (Spain) ESP | Marc Aguado | 1 | 0 | 0 | 0 | 0+1 | 0 |
Forwards
| 7 | FW | (Spain) ESP | Miguel Linares | 16 | 2 | 0+12 | 1 | 4 | 1 |
| 11 | FW | (Spain) ESP | Javi Puado | 16 | 4 | 15 | 3 | 1 | 1 |
| 26 | FW | (Colombia) COL | Luis Suárez | 30 | 17 | 28+1 | 17 | 0+1 | 0 |
| 28 | FW | (Spain) ESP | Marcos Baselga | 1 | 0 | 0 | 0 | 0+1 | 0 |
| 37 | FW | (Spain) ESP | Ahmed Belhadji | 1 | 0 | 0 | 0 | 0+1 | 0 |
Players who have made an appearance or had a squad number this season but have left the club
| 3 | DF | (Spain) ESP | Daniel Lasure | 9 | 0 | 3+6 | 0 | 0 | 0 |
| 4 | MF | (Equatorial Guinea) GEQ | Federico Bikoro | 1 | 0 | 0 | 0 | 1 | 0 |
| 8 | MF | (Spain) ESP | Jorge Pombo | 11 | 0 | 4+6 | 0 | 1 | 0 |
| 19 | MF | (Georgia (country)) GEO | Giorgi Papunashvili | 13 | 2 | 2+9 | 0 | 2 | 2 |
| 20 | DF | (Switzerland) SUI | Simone Grippo | 17 | 0 | 11+2 | 0 | 4 | 0 |
