= Álex Pachón =

Spanish footballer

Personal information
- Full name: Alejandro Pachón Parraga
- Date of birth: 17 July 2000 (age 26)
- Place of birth: Vilafranca del Penedès, Spain
- Height: 1.85 m (6 ft 1 in)
- Position: Forward

Team information
- Current team: Atlético Baleares
- Number: 25

Youth career
- Gimnàstic Manresa
- 2017–2018: Girona

Senior career*
Years	Team	Apps	(Gls)
2017–2019	Peralada	32	(4)
2019–2021	Girona	4	(0)
2019–2020	→ Andorra (loan)	9	(1)
2020	→ Prat (loan)	8	(0)
2020–2021	Girona B	23	(7)
2021–2023	Las Palmas B	44	(11)
2023	Granada B	14	(1)
2023–2024	Manresa	27	(2)
2024–2025	Bergantiños	33	(10)
2025–2026	Unionistas	8	(0)
2026–	Atlético Baleares	12	(1)
- * Club domestic league appearances and goals as of 7 May 2026

Alejandro "Álex" Pachón Parraga (born 17 July 2000) is a Spanish professional footballer who plays for Segunda Federación club Atlético Baleares as a forward.

== Club career ==
Born in Vilafranca del Penedès, Barcelona, Catalonia, Pachón joined Girona FC's youth setup in 2017, from Club Gimnàstic de Manresa. He made his senior debut with farm team CF Peralada-Girona B on 26 August 2017, coming on as a second-half substitute for Maximiliano Villa in a 1–4 Segunda División B loss against Valencia CF Mestalla.

Pachón scored his first senior goal on 23 September 2018, netting the equalizer in a 2–2 home draw against CD Atlético Baleares. He made his professional debut the following 31 January, replacing fellow youth graduate Paik Seung-ho in a 1–3 home defeat to Real Madrid, for the season's Copa del Rey; he also assisted Pedro Porro's goal.

On 14 August 2019, Pachón was loaned to third division newcomers FC Andorra for one year. The following 17 January, he moved to fellow league team AE Prat, also in a temporary deal.
