= Álex Blanco (footballer, born 1998) =

Spanish footballer

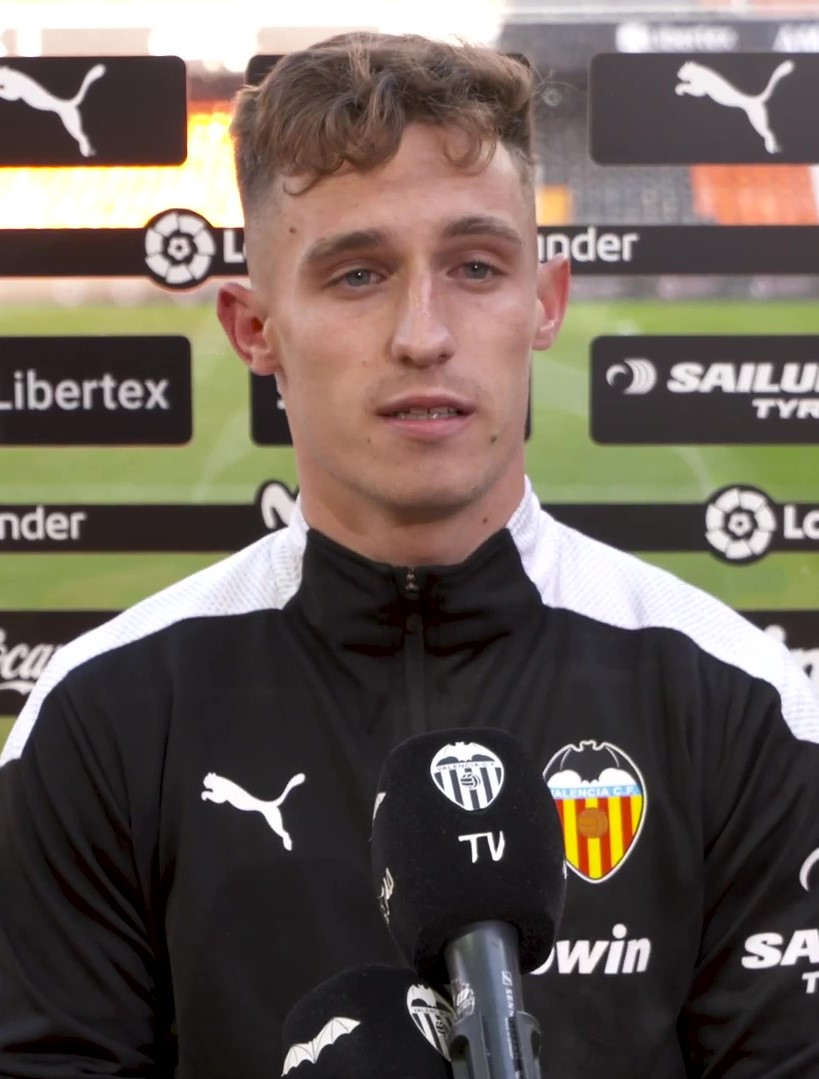
- Blanco 2021

Personal information
- Full name: Alejandro Blanco Sánchez
- Date of birth: 16 December 1998 (age 27)
- Place of birth: Benidorm, Spain
- Height: 1.78 m (5 ft 10 in)
- Position: Winger

Team information
- Current team: Ümraniyespor
- Number: 11

Youth career
- Colegio Lope de Vega
- Alicante
- Kelme
- 2011–2014: Valencia
- 2014–2016: Barcelona
- 2016–2017: Valencia

Senior career*
| Years | Team | Apps | (Gls) |
| 2017–2022 | Valencia B | 51 | (11) |
| 2018–2022 | Valencia | 13 | (1) |
| 2018–2019 | → Alavés (loan) | 2 | (0) |
| 2019–2020 | → Zaragoza (loan) | 30 | (2) |
| 2022–2024 | Como | 50 | (3) |
| 2024 | Reggiana | 4 | (0) |
| 2024–2026 | Olimpija Ljubljana | 48 | (4) |
| 2026– | Ümraniyespor | 14 | (3) |

International career
| 2014 | Spain U17 | 3 | (0) |
| 2016 | Spain U19 | 2 | (0) |
- * Club domestic league appearances and goals as of 8 November 2026

Alejandro "Álex" Blanco Sánchez (born 16 December 1998) is a Spanish professional footballer who plays as a winger for Turkish TFF 1. Lig club Ümraniyespor.

== Club career ==
=== Valencia Mestalla ===
Born in Benidorm, Alicante, Valencian Community, Blanco joined FC Barcelona's youth setup in 2014, from Valencia CF. On 22 July 2016, he returned to the Che, being assigned to the Juvenil A squad.

Blanco made his senior debut with the reserves on 16 September 2017, coming on as a second-half substitute in a 3–2 Segunda División B away win against Atlético Saguntino. He scored his first goal on 9 December, netting the equalizer in a 1–1 draw at CE Sabadell FC.

On 18 January 2018, Blanco renewed his contract with Valencia until 2020. On 4 February, he scored a brace in a 4–1 home routing of Saguntino.

=== Deportivo Alavés ===
Blanco made his first team debut on 30 October 2018, replacing fellow youth graduate Lee Kang-in in a 2–1 away defeat of CD Ebro, for the season's Copa del Rey. On 31 January 2019, Blanco was loaned to fellow La Liga side Deportivo Alavés, until June.

Blanco made his top tier debut on 3 February 2019, replacing Jonathan Calleri in a 3–0 loss at Real Madrid. However, he only appeared in one further match before returning to his parent club.

=== Real Zaragoza ===
On 9 July 2019, Blanco extended his contract with the Che until 2021 and joined Real Zaragoza on loan for the season. He scored his first professional goal the following 21 January, netting the opener in a 3–1 home win against RCD Mallorca for the national cup.

=== Valencia ===
On 29 September 2020, Blanco started Valencia's opening game of the 2020–21 La Liga season away to Real Sociedad, in a 1–0 win. He scored his first goal in the top tier on 21 March of the following year, netting his team's second in a 2–1 home success over Granada CF.

=== Italy ===
On 18 January 2022, he signed a contract with Italian Serie B club Como until the end of the 2023–24 season.

On 31 January 2024, Blanco signed with Reggiana until the end of the season, with an automatic extension for 2024–25 if Reggiana stays in Serie B.

=== Olimpija Ljubljana ===
On 30 August 2024, Blanco signed a two-season contract with Olimpija Ljubljana in Slovenia. In his debut season with Olimpija Ljubljana, Alex Blanco made an immediate impact. He contributed to the club’s triumph in the Slovenian PrvaLiga, helping secure the league title. Blanco also marked his European debut in the UEFA Europa Conference League, where he scored his first goal in continental competition. Over the course of the season, he netted a total of six goals, a notable milestone that represented one of the most successful chapters in his professional career to date.

== Personal life ==
Blanco's father Tito was also a footballer. A midfielder, he also represented Barcelona.

== Career statistics ==
=== Club ===
As of 27 January 2024

Appearances and goals by club, season and competition
| Club | Season | League | | | National Cup | | Continental | | Other | | Total | |
| Club | Season | Division | Apps | Goals | Apps | Goals | Apps | Goals | Apps | Goals | Apps | Goals |
|---|---|---|---|---|---|---|---|---|---|---|---|---|
| Valencia B | 2017–18 | Segunda División B | 30 | 6 | — | | — | | — | | 30 | 6 |
| Valencia B | 2018–19 | Segunda División B | 21 | 5 | — | | — | | — | | 21 | 5 |
| Valencia B | Total | | 51 | 11 | 0 | 0 | 0 | 0 | 0 | 0 | 51 | 11 |
| Valencia | 2018–19 | La Liga | 0 | 0 | 2 | 0 | — | | — | | 2 | 0 |
| Valencia | 2020–21 | La Liga | 13 | 1 | 3 | 0 | — | | — | | 16 | 1 |
| Valencia | Total | | 13 | 1 | 5 | 0 | 0 | 0 | 0 | 0 | 18 | 1 |
| Alavés (loan) | 2018–19 | La Liga | 2 | 0 | — | | — | | — | | 2 | 0 |
| Zaragoza (loan) | 2019–20 | Segunda División | 30 | 2 | 3 | 1 | — | | 1 (Note: Appearance(s) in Segunda División play-offs) | 0 | 34 | 3 |
| Como | 2021–22 | Serie B | 16 | 1 | 0 | 0 | — | | — | | 16 | 1 |
| Como | 2022–23 | Serie B | 29 | 2 | 1 | 1 | — | | — | | 30 | 2 |
| Como | 2023–24 | Serie B | 5 | 0 | 0 | 0 | — | | — | | 5 | 0 |
| Como | Total | | 50 | 3 | 1 | 1 | — | | — | | 51 | 3 |
| Career total | | | 146 | 17 | 9 | 2 | 0 | 0 | 1 | 0 | 156 | 19 |

== Honours ==
Valencia

- Copa del Rey: 2018–19
