= Bergantiños FC =

Association football club in Spain

Coordinates: 43.235388°N 8.686927°W

Bergantiños
- Full name: Bergantiños Fútbol Club
- Nickname: Berga
- Founded: 1923; 103 years ago
- Stadium: As Eiroas
- Capacity: 5,000
- President: Franco Salerno
- Head coach: Luceano Zabala
- League: Segunda Federación – Group 1
- 2025–26: Segunda Federación – Group 1, 10th of 18
Home colours	Away colours

Bergantiños Fútbol Club is a Spanish football team based in Carballo, Province of A Coruña, in the autonomous community of Galicia. Founded in 1923, it plays in Segunda Federación – Group 1, playing home matches at Estadio As Eiroas, with a capacity of 5,000 seats.

== Season to season ==
Season	Tier	Division	Place	Copa del Rey
1929–1947	—	Regional	—	
1947–48	4	Serie A	2nd	
1948–49	4	Serie A	2nd	
1950–51	4	Serie A		
1951–52	4	Serie A	2nd	
1952–1958	DNP			
1958–59	5	1ª Reg.	3rd	
1959–60	5	1ª Reg.	10th	
1960–61	6	2ª Reg.	3rd	
1961–62	5	1ª Reg.	3rd	
1962–63	4	Serie A	5th	
1963–64	4	Serie A	5th	
1964–65	4	Serie A	9th	
1965–66	4	Serie A	7th	
1966–67	4	Serie A	8th	
1967–68	4	Serie A	8th	
1968–69	4	Serie A	6th	
1969–70	4	Serie A	6th	
1970–71	4	Serie A	10th	
1971–72	4	Serie A	4th	

Season	Tier	Division	Place	Copa del Rey
1972–73	4	Serie A	11th	
1973–74	4	Serie A	9th	
1974–75	4	Serie A	7th	
1975–76	4	Serie A	20th	
1976–77	5	1ª Reg.	2nd	
1977–78	6	1ª Reg.	4th	
1978–79	6	1ª Reg.	17th	
1979–80	7	2ª Reg.	3rd	
1980–81	7	2ª Reg.	7th	
1981–82	7	2ª Reg.	2nd	
1982–83	6	1ª Reg.	2nd	
1983–84	5	Reg. Pref.	6th	
1984–85	5	Reg. Pref.	3rd	
1985–86	5	Reg. Pref.	1st	
1986–87	4	3ª	4th	
1987–88	3	2ª B	11th	Fourth round
1988–89	3	2ª B	20th	First round
1989–90	4	3ª	4th	
1990–91	4	3ª	2nd	Second round
1991–92	4	3ª	4th	First round

Season	Tier	Division	Place	Copa del Rey
1992–93	4	3ª	13th	First round
1993–94	4	3ª	1st	
1994–95	4	3ª	19th	First round
1995–96	5	Reg. Pref.	6th	
1996–97	5	Reg. Pref.	17th	
1997–98	6	1ª Reg.	6th	
1998–99	6	1ª Reg.	2nd	
1999–2000	5	Reg. Pref.	7th	
2000–01	5	Reg. Pref.	7th	
2001–02	5	Reg. Pref.	1st	
2002–03	4	3ª	15th	
2003–04	4	3ª	10th	
2004–05	4	3ª	12th	
2005–06	4	3ª	11th	
2006–07	4	3ª	18th	
2007–08	5	Pref. Aut.	6th	
2008–09	5	Pref. Aut.	2nd	
2009–10	4	3ª	14th	
2010–11	4	3ª	14th	
2011–12	4	3ª	13th	

Season	Tier	Division	Place	Copa del Rey
2012–13	4	3ª	18th	
2013–14	5	Pref. Aut.	2nd	
2014–15	4	3ª	5th	
2015–16	4	3ª	16th	
2016–17	4	3ª	4th	
2017–18	4	3ª	2nd	
2018–19	4	3ª	2nd	
2019–20	4	3ª	13th	First round
2020–21	4	3ª	1st / 2nd	
2021–22	4	2ª RFEF	6th	Second round
2022–23	4	2ª Fed.	18th	
2023–24	5	3ª Fed.	1st	
2024–25	4	2ª Fed.	8th	First round
2025–26	4	2ª Fed.	10th	
2026–27	4	2ª Fed.		

- 2 seasons in Segunda División B
- 5 seasons in Segunda Federación/Segunda División RFEF
- 23 seasons in Tercera División
- 1 season in Tercera Federación

== Honours ==
- Tercera División: 1993–94

== Current squad ==
As of 10 September 2026

Note: Flags indicate national team as defined under FIFA eligibility rules; some limited exceptions apply. Players may hold more than one non-FIFA nationality.

No.	Pos.	Nation	Player
1	GK	ESP	Alberto Sánchez
2	DF	ESP	Joseda Álvarez
3	DF	ESP	Dani Jodar
4	MF	ARG	Tomás Fuentes
5	DF	ESP	Aarón Sánchez
6	MF	ESP	Yago Gandoy
7	FW	ESP	Hugo Villaverde
8	MF	ESP	David Iglesias
9	FW	ESP	Álex Pachón
10	MF	ESP	Iago Novo
11	MF	ESP	Koke Sáiz

No.	Pos.	Nation	Player
13	GK	ESP	Carlos García
14	MF	ESP	José Balsa
16	DF	ESP	Nacho Pastor
17	MF	ESP	Adrián Álvarez
18	MF	NGR	Daniel Onyia
19	DF	ESP	René Pérez
20	FW	KAZ	Danil Ankudinov
21	FW	ESP	Ale Sánchez
22	DF	ESP	Isra Pérez
23	DF	ESP	Manu Berrocal
26	FW	NGR	Kelechi Edeh

=== Out on loan ===
Note: Flags indicate national team as defined under FIFA eligibility rules; some limited exceptions apply. Players may hold more than one non-FIFA nationality.

No.	Pos.	Nation	Player
24	FW	NGR	Franck Uwumiro (at Atlético Arteixo until 30 June 2027)

== Famous players ==
- (Russia) Dmitri Radchenko
- (Spain) Angeliño
