= Gonzalo Crettaz =

Argentine footballer (born 2000)

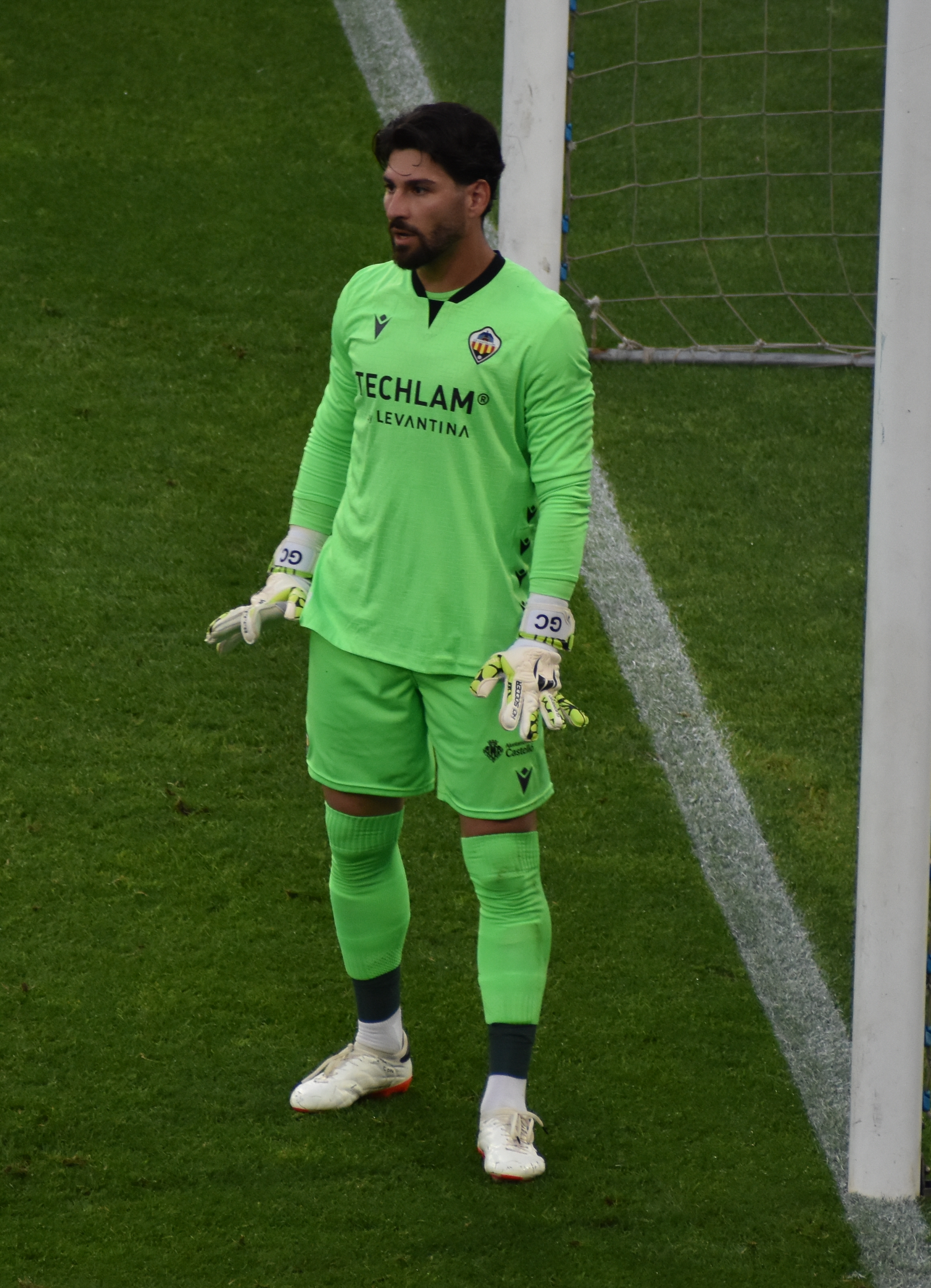
- Crettaz playing for Castellón in 2024

Personal information
- Full name: Gonzalo Alejandro Crettaz Ortega
- Date of birth: 28 February 2000 (age 26)
- Place of birth: Buenos Aires, Argentina
- Height: 1.81 m (5 ft 11 in)
- Position: Goalkeeper

Team information
- Current team: NEC
- Number: 1

Youth career
- Levante
- 2017–2019: Málaga

Senior career*
Years	Team	Apps	(Gls)
2019–2021	Málaga B	37	(0)
2019–2022	Málaga	2	(0)
2021–2022	→ Badajoz (loan)	24	(0)
2022–2023	Logroñés	26	(0)
2023–2025	Castellón	77	(0)
2025–	NEC	39	(0)
- * Club domestic league appearances and goals as of 25 October 2026

Gonzalo Alejandro Crettaz Ortega (born 28 February 2000), sometimes known simply as Gonzalo, is an Argentine footballer who plays as a goalkeeper for Eredivisie club NEC.

== Club career ==
Born in Buenos Aires, Crettaz moved to Spain at early age and joined Málaga CF's youth setup in 2017, from Levante UD. He made his senior debut with the reserves on 25 August 2019, starting in a 4–0 Tercera División away routing of Alhaurín de la Torre CF.

On 16 November 2019, as Munir was out on international duty, Crettaz made his first team debut by playing the full 90 minutes of a 0–1 loss at AD Alcorcón in the Segunda División championship. On 17 August 2021, after being mainly a third-choice option in the main squad, he was loaned to Primera División RFEF side CD Badajoz, for one year.

On 15 August 2022, Crettaz was transferred to UD Logroñés also in the third division. On 7 July 2023, after suffering relegation, he moved to fellow league team CD Castellón on a two-year deal, and was an undisputed starter as the club achieved promotion to the second division.

On 10 June 2025, despite still remaining a first-choice, Crettaz left the Orelluts as his contract was due to expire.

On the next day, Crettaz signed a three-year contract with NEC in the Dutch top-tier Eredivisie, reuniting with his former Castellón manager Dick Schreuder. Robin Roefs, who was NEC's first-choice goalkeeper in the previous season, moved to the Premier League in the off-season. Crettaz established himself as the main goalkeeper at NEC in the 2025–26 season, as the club finished the season in 3rd place, earning a spot in the Champions League qualifying rounds for the first time in club's history.

== Career statistics ==
As of match played 25 October 2026

Appearances and goals by club, season and competition
Club	Season	League			National cup		Europe		Other		Total	
Club	Season	Division	Apps	Goals	Apps	Goals	App	Goals	Apps	Goals	Apps	Goals
Málaga B	2018–19	Segunda División B	0	0	—		—		—		0	0
Málaga B	2019–20	Tercera División	12	0	—		—		—		12	0
Málaga B	2019–20	Tercera División	22	0	—		—		3	0	25	0
Málaga B	Total		34	0	—		—		3	0	47	0
Málaga	2019–20	Segunda División	2	0	1	0	—		—		3	0
Málaga	2020–21	Segunda División	0	0	0	0	—		—		0	0
Málaga	Total		2	0	1	0	—		—		3	0
Badajoz (loan)	2021–22	Primera División RFEF	24	0	0	0	—		—		24	0
Logroñés	2022–23	Primera Federación	26	0	3	0	—		—		29	0
Castellón	2023–24	Primera Federación	37	0	0	0	—		—		37	0
Castellón	2024–25	Segunda División	40	0	0	0	—		2	0	42	0
Castellón	Total		77	0	0	0	—		2	0	79	0
NEC	2025–26	Eredivisie	31	0	1	0	—		—		32	0
NEC	2026–27	Eredivisie	8	0	0	0	6 (Note: Four appearances in UEFA Champions League, two appearances in UEFA Europa League)	0	—		14	0
NEC	Total		39	0	1	0	6	0	—		46	0
Career total			202	0	5	0	6	0	5	0	218	0
