= Nacho Pastor =

Spanish footballer

Personal information
- Full name: Ignacio Pastor Alemañ
- Date of birth: 3 April 2000 (age 26)
- Place of birth: Elche, Spain
- Height: 1.87 m (6 ft 2 in)
- Position: Centre back

Team information
- Current team: Bergantiños
- Number: 16

Youth career
- 2004–2011: Intangco
- 2011–2019: Elche

Senior career*
Years	Team	Apps	(Gls)
2019–2020	Elche B	23	(0)
2020–2021	Elche	0	(0)
2020–2021	→ Lorca Deportiva (loan)	4	(0)
2021	→ Tarazona (loan)	11	(0)
2021–2022	Huesca B	21	(0)
2022–2023	Tarazona	22	(0)
2023–2024	Manresa	15	(0)
2024	Numancia	9	(1)
2024–2025	Orihuela	18	(0)
2025–	Bergantiños	30	(0)
- * Club domestic league appearances and goals as of 14 May 2026

Ignacio "Nacho" Pastor Alemañ (born 3 April 2000) is a Spanish footballer who plays as a central defender for Bergantiños.

== Club career ==
Born in Elche, Alicante, Valencian Community, Pastor joined Elche CF's youth setup in 2011, from SCD Intangco. Promoted to the reserves in July 2019, he made his senior debut on 25 August by starting in a 1–1 Tercera División home draw against Atzeneta UE.

Pastor made his first team debut on 11 January 2020, playing the full 90 minutes in a 2–1 away defeat of Yeclano Deportivo, for the season's Copa del Rey. His professional debut occurred eleven days later, as he started in a 1–1 home draw against Athletic Bilbao, with his side being knocked out in the penalty shoot-outs.

On 5 October 2020, Pastor was loaned to Segunda División B side CF Lorca Deportiva for one year, but moved to fellow league team SD Tarazona the following 8 January, also in a temporary deal. On 13 August 2021, he moved to SD Huesca and was assigned to the B-team in Segunda División RFEF.
