= Luis Suárez (Colombian footballer) =

Colombian footballer (born 1997)

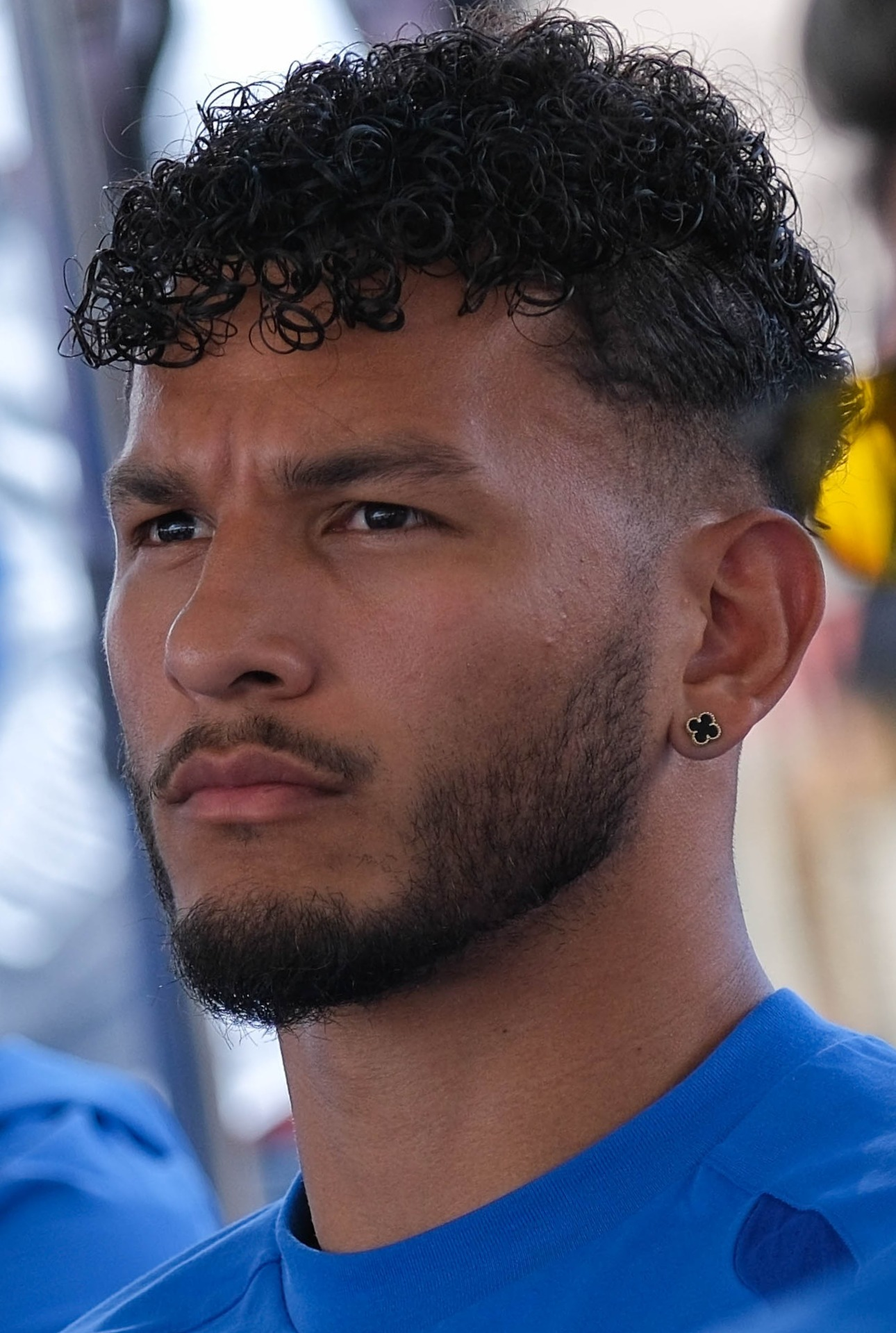
- Suárez with Colombia in 2026

Personal information
- Full name: Luis Javier Suárez Charris
- Date of birth: 2 December 1997 (age 28)
- Place of birth: Santa Marta, Colombia
- Height: 1.85 m (6 ft 1 in)
- Position: Forward

Team information
- Current team: Sporting CP
- Number: 97

Youth career
- Leones

Senior career*
Years	Team	Apps	(Gls)
2015–2017	Leones	8	(0)
2016–2017	→ Granada B (loan)	35	(5)
2017–2020	Watford	0	(0)
2017–2018	→ Valladolid B (loan)	34	(11)
2018–2019	→ Gimnàstic (loan)	36	(7)
2019–2020	→ Zaragoza (loan)	38	(19)
2020–2022	Granada	64	(13)
2022–2023	Marseille	7	(3)
2023	→ Almería (loan)	21	(4)
2023–2025	Almería	56	(33)
2025–	Sporting CP	43	(37)

International career^{‡}
2020–	Colombia	20	(6)
- * Club domestic league appearances and goals as of 7 November 2026 (UTC) ‡ National team caps and goals as of 6 October 2026 (UTC)

Luis Javier Suárez Charris (born 2 December 1997) is a Colombian professional footballer who plays as a forward for Primeira Liga club Sporting CP and the Colombia national team.

After beginning his career in Colombia with Leones, he moved to Spain with Granada B in 2016, followed by loans at Valladolid B in 2017, Gimnàstic in 2018, and Zaragoza in 2019. In 2020, he signed for Granada, before joining Marseille in 2022. He later moved to Almería in 2023, a deal made permanent after the club secured La Liga safety. He finished as the Segunda División top scorer in 2025, before transferring to Sporting CP later that year.

Suarez made his senior debut for Colombia in 2020, in a World Cup qualifier against Uruguay.

== Club career ==
=== Early career ===
Born in Santa Marta, Suárez made his senior debut with Leones on 5 October 2015, coming on as a second-half substitute in a 1–3 Categoría Primera B away loss against América de Cali. The following 1 March, after eight first-team appearances, he was loaned to Granada CF until 2017 with a buyout clause, and was assigned to the reserves in Segunda División B.

On 17 July 2017, after having his federative rights assigned to Watford, Suárez was loaned to Real Valladolid B in the third division for a year. The following 9 July, after scoring 11 goals, he joined Segunda División side Gimnàstic de Tarragona also in a temporary deal.

Suárez made his professional debut on 20 August 2018, replacing Tete Morente late into a 1–1 home draw against Tenerife. He scored his first goal on 7 October, netting the equalizer in a 1–1 draw at Cádiz.

On 21 June 2019, Suárez was loaned to Real Zaragoza, still in the Spanish second division. He ended the regular season with 19 goals, being the team's top goalscorer, but was not allowed to play in the play-offs as his loan ended.

=== Granada ===
Suárez signed for Granada CF on a 5-year contract ahead of the 2020–21 La Liga season, making his first sustained appearances in Spanish top‑flight and European competition.

==== 2020–21 season ====
He scored in Granada's 2–1 victory against Omonia Nicosia in the UEFA Europa League group stage, giving Granada the lead early in the match at the Estadio Nuevo Los Cármenes on 26 November 2020. Prior to that, he had also helped Granada to stretch their unbeaten run in the competition with a goal in a 2–0 away win against Omonia in Cyprus earlier in the group phase.

In domestic league action, Suárez played regularly across the season and contributed offensively. He opened the scoring for Granada in a 2–0 home win against CA Osasuna in January 2021, striking early in the match to give his side the advantage. Granada finished the season in the middle of the league table, consolidating their status following the previous season's European qualification.

==== 2021–22 season ====
In the 2021–22 season, Suárez continued to be a first‑team figure for Granada. He scored the opening goal in a 1–1 draw against Valencia on 21 August 2021, giving Granada an early lead before the hosts levelled the match later in the game. Across the campaign, he remained one of Granada's regular attacking players, contributing goals and minutes in La Liga as the team battled to maintain top‑flight status.

Despite individual contributions, Granada struggled for consistency throughout the season and were ultimately relegated after finishing 18th in La Liga.

=== Marseille ===
On 18 July 2022, Suárez signed for French club Olympique de Marseille ahead of the 2022–23 Ligue 1 season.

Suárez made his debut on 7 August 2022 in the opening match of the Ligue 1 campaign against Reims at the Stade Vélodrome. He scored twice in the 4–1 victory to secure the win for Marseille.

Despite his bright start, Suárez's playing time became limited as the 2022–23 Ligue 1 season progressed, and he scored only three goals in domestic competition — including a debut brace against Reims and a goal against Angers — before departing Marseille on loan to Almería in the winter transfer window.

=== Almería ===
Suárez joined UD Almería on loan from Marseille in December 2022, with an obligatory purchase clause if the club avoided relegation from La Liga.

==== 2022–23 season (loan) ====
He made his competitive debut in a league match against Real Sociedad in January 2023.

On 27 April, Suárez scored the first goal in a 2–1 away win against Getafe, giving Almería the lead early in the match. He added a second goal in the 58th minute to secure the victory. Almería finished the season in 17th place, avoiding relegation and activating the purchase clause for Suárez.

==== 2023–24 season ====
Suárez scored his first goal of the season on 26 September 2023, converting a penalty in a 5–1 away defeat to Sevilla in La Liga.

On 1 October, he scored the opening goal in a 3–3 home draw against his ex-team Granada in La Liga. He scored again four minutes later to make it 2–0, and completed a first-half hat-trick one minute after that to put Almería 3–0 up at halftime. Suárez suffered a partial fibula fracture during the match and was sidelined for several months. Almería finished the season in the relegation zone and were relegated to the Segunda División.

==== 2024–25 season ====
In the Segunda División, Suárez scored the opening goal on 18 December 2024 in a 4–1 away win against Racing de Ferrol, giving Almería the lead. He added a second goal from a penalty later in the match to make it 2–1, and scored again in the 83rd minute to complete a hat-trick.

In the Copa del Rey, Suárez scored a hat-trick on 4 January in a 4–1 victory over Sevilla. Suárez scored the opener on 15 January in a 2–3 Copa del Rey loss to Leganés.

On 4 March 2025, he scored from a penalty in the 42nd minute to open the scoring in a 2–1 home win over Racing de Ferrol and added a second goal in the 51st minute to seal the victory.

Across all competitions, Suárez scored 31 goals for Almería, including 27 league goals, which made him the top scorer of the Segunda División season and earned him Pichichi Trophy. At the end of the 2024–25 season, Suárez transferred to Sporting CP in July 2025.

=== Sporting CP ===
On 28 July 2025, Primeira Liga side Sporting CP announced the signing of Suárez until 2030, for a reported transfer fee of €25 million including add-ons.

==== 2025–26 season ====
A month later, on 17 August, he scored his first goals by netting a brace in a 6–0 win over Arouca. Later that year, on 1 October, he netted his first UEFA Champions League goal by converting a penalty in a 2–1 away defeat to Napoli. On 20 January 2026, Suarez netted both goals in a 2–1 victory over Paris Saint-Germain. He eventually concluded his debut season with Sporting as the Primeira Liga top scorer with 28 goals.

== International career ==
On 12 November 2020, Suárez debuted for the Colombian senior team against Uruguay. Portuguese football manager Carlos Queiroz was the national coach of Colombia when Suárez was named to represent the national team and accepted the invitation, although he was also becoming eligible to represent the Spain national football team as well. On 9 September 2025 against Venezuela he scored four goals (42', 50', 59', 67') in a World Cup Qualifier in Estadio Monumental de Maturín in the city of Maturín, Monagas in Venezuela.

On 25 May 2026, he was named in head coach Néstor Lorenzo's final 26-man squad for the 2026 FIFA World Cup. He made his FIFA World Cup debut as a starter on 17 June in a 3–1 victory over Uzbekistan.

== Style of play ==
Known for his explosive pace, direct attacking style and powerful finishing, Suárez operates primarily as a center-forward but can shift to wide positions, especially on the left, where he cuts in using his dominant right foot. These characteristics and player traits are not detrimental to make him being regarded as a player with the ability to score goals with his strong left foot as well. His game relies on rapid acceleration, strong physical presence, and clever movement inside the box. Suárez excels in counterattacks and transitional phases, making him a constant threat when his team regains possession. With high intensity on and off the ball, he contributes not only with goals but also with assists and pressing duties.

== Personal life ==
Suárez holds Spanish passport in addition to his Colombian citizenship and therefore is a citizen of the European Union. He has a tattoo on his left arm depicting a lion, describing an identification with the animal "because of its personality and character, and the tenacity with which it protects its pack".

Luis Suárez faced a domestic violence accusation in court. The Colombian forward was detained on December 11, 2024, after his ex-wife filed a complaint for physical and psychological abuse. The alleged victim highlighted several episodes of physical, psychological, and social violence that reportedly occurred in Granada and Marseille between 2020 and 2023, accusations that the player always denied. Suárez's request to visit their shared son, after the couple had been separated for about a year, triggered the complaint of his ex-wife. The case went to the domestic violence court in Granada where an agreement was ultimately reached between the parties.

== Career statistics ==
=== Club ===
As of match played 7 November 2026

Appearances and goals by club, season and competition
Club	Season	League			National cup (Note: Includes Copa del Rey, Taça de Portugal)		League cup (Note: Includes Taça da Liga)		Continental		Other		Total	
Club	Season	Division	Apps	Goals	Apps	Goals	Apps	Goals	Apps	Goals	Apps	Goals	Apps	Goals
Leones	2015	Categoría Primera B	8	0	—		—		—		—		8	0
Granada B (loan)	2016–17	Segunda División B	35	5	—		—		—		—		35	5
Valladolid B (loan)	2017–18	Segunda División B	34	11	—		—		—		—		34	11
Gimnàstic (loan)	2018–19	Segunda División	36	7	1	0	—		—		—		37	7
Zaragoza (loan)	2019–20	Segunda División	38	19	1	0	—		—		—		39	19
Granada	2020–21	La Liga	27	5	2	0	—		8 (Note: Appearances in UEFA Europa League)	2	—		37	7
Granada	2021–22	La Liga	37	8	1	0	—		—		—		38	8
Granada	Total		64	13	3	0	—		8	2	—		75	15
Marseille	2022–23	Ligue 1	7	3	0	0	—		4 (Note: Appearances in UEFA Champions League)	0	—		11	3
Almería (loan)	2022–23	La Liga	21	4	0	0	—		—		—		21	4
Almería	2023–24	La Liga	15	6	0	0	—		—		—		15	6
Almería	2024–25	Segunda División	41	27	2	4	—		—		—		43	31
Almería	Almería total		77	37	2	4	—		—		—		79	41
Sporting CP	2025–26	Primeira Liga	32	28	7	4	1	1	12	5	1 (Note: Appearance in Supertaça Cândido de Oliveira)	0	53	38
Sporting CP	2026–27	Primeira Liga	11	9	0	0	0	0	4	4	—		15	13
Sporting CP	Total		43	37	7	4	1	1	16	9	1	0	68	51
Career total			342	132	14	8	1	1	28	11	1	0	386	152

=== International ===
As of match played 6 October 2026

Appearances and goals by national team and year
National team	Year	Apps	Goals
Colombia	2020	1	0
Colombia	2021	0	0
Colombia	2022	3	0
Colombia	2023	0	0
Colombia	2024	0	0
Colombia	2025	4	4
Colombia	2026	12	2
Total		20	6

Scores and results list Colombia's goal tally first, score column indicates score after each Suárez goal.

List of international goals scored by Luis Suárez
No.	Date	Venue	Cap	Opponent	Score	Result	Competition
1	9 September 2025	Estadio Monumental, Maturín, Venezuela	6	Venezuela	2–2	6–3	2026 FIFA World Cup qualification
2	9 September 2025	Estadio Monumental, Maturín, Venezuela	6	Venezuela	3–2	6–3	2026 FIFA World Cup qualification
3	9 September 2025	Estadio Monumental, Maturín, Venezuela	6	Venezuela	4–2	6–3	2026 FIFA World Cup qualification
4	9 September 2025	Estadio Monumental, Maturín, Venezuela	6	Venezuela	5–2	6–3	2026 FIFA World Cup qualification
5	1 June 2026	Estadio El Campín, Bogotá, Colombia	11	Costa Rica	3–1	3–1	Friendly
6	26 September 2026	M&T Bank Stadium, Baltimore, United States	18	Mexico	1–0	1–1	Friendly

== Honours ==
Individual

- Segunda División top scorer: 2024–25
- Primeira Liga top scorer: 2025–26
- Primeira Liga Player of the Month: January 2026, February 2026
- Primeira Liga Team of the Season: 2025–26
