= Alberto Soro =

Spanish footballer

Personal information
- Full name: Alberto Soro Álvarez
- Date of birth: 9 March 1999 (age 27)
- Place of birth: Ejea de los Caballeros, Spain
- Height: 1.73 m (5 ft 8 in)
- Positions: Winger; attacking midfielder

Team information
- Current team: Dinamo București
- Number: 29

Youth career
- 2007–2009: Ejea
- 2009–2018: Zaragoza

Senior career*
Years	Team	Apps	(Gls)
2017–2018	Deportivo Aragón	2	(0)
2018–2019	Zaragoza	29	(2)
2019–2020	Real Madrid	0	(0)
2019–2020	→ Zaragoza (loan)	34	(4)
2020–2024	Granada	47	(1)
2023–2024	→ Vizela (loan)	21	(4)
2024–	Dinamo București	47	(8)
2025	→ Chaves (loan)	15	(0)

International career
2017	Spain U18	2	(0)
- * Club domestic league appearances and goals as of 6 November 2026

Alberto Soro Álvarez (born 9 March 1999) is a Spanish professional footballer who plays as a winger or attacking midfielder for Liga I club Dinamo București.

== Club career ==
Soro was born in Ejea de los Caballeros, Zaragoza, Aragon, and joined Real Zaragoza's youth setup in 2009, from SD Ejea. He made his senior debut with the reserves on 14 May 2017, coming on as a second-half substitute in a 3–0 Tercera División home win against AD CF Épila.

Soro made his professional debut with on 25 August 2018, replacing Diogo Verdasca in a 0–0 home draw against Real Zaragoza in the Segunda División championship. He scored his first professional goal on 8 September, netting the last in a 4–0 away routing of Real Oviedo.

On 5 October 2018, Soro renewed his contract until 2022 and was definitely promoted to the main squad. He ended his first campaign with two goals in 29 appearances, as his side avoided relegation.

On 26 July 2019, Soro signed for Real Madrid until 2024, being immediately loaned back to Zaragoza for the season. He was a regular starter during his spell, contributing with four goals in 39 matches overall as his side narrowly missed out promotion in the play-offs.

On 1 September 2020, Soro signed a five-year contract with La Liga side Granada CF. On 31 August 2023, Primeira Liga side Vizela announced his signing on a season-long loan from Granada, with an optional buy-clause. On 19 June 2024, Granada announced the termination of Soro's contract.

== Career statistics ==
As of match played 6 November 2026

Appearances and goals by club, season and competition
Club	Season	League			National cup (Note: Includes Copa del Rey, Taça de Portugal, Cupa României)		League cup		Europe		Other		Total	
Club	Season	Division	Apps	Goals	Apps	Goals~	Apps	Goals	Apps	Goals	Apps	Goals	Apps	Goals
Deportivo Aragón	2016–17	Tercera División	1	0	—		—		—		2 (Note: Appearances in Tercera División play-offs)	0	3	0
Deportivo Aragón	2017–18	Segunda División B	1	0	—		—		—		—		1	0
Deportivo Aragón	Total		2	0	0	0	—		—		2	0	4	0
Zaragoza	2018–19	Segunda División	29	2	2	0	—		—		—		31	2
Zaragoza (loan)	2019–20	Segunda División	34	4	3	0	—		—		2 (Note: Appearances in Segunda División play-offs)	0	39	4
Zaragoza (loan)	Total		63	6	5	0	—		—		2	0	70	6
Granada	2020–21	La Liga	15	1	5	1	—		8 (Note: Appearances in UEFA Europa League)	1	—		28	3
Granada	2021–22	La Liga	16	0	1	0	—		—		—		17	0
Granada	2022–23	Segunda División	15	0	2	0	—		—		—		17	0
Granada	2023–24	La Liga	1	0	0	0	—		—		—		1	0
Granada	Total		47	1	8	1	—		8	1	—		63	3
Vizela (loan)	2023–24	Primeira Liga	21	4	3	0	0	0	—		—		24	4
Dinamo București	2024–25	Liga I	6	0	2	0	—		—		—		8	0
Dinamo București	2025–26	Liga I	26	4	5	0	—		—		0	0	31	4
Dinamo București	2026–27	Liga I	15	4	1	0	—		—		—		16	4
Dinamo București	Total		47	8	8	0	—		—		0	0	55	8
Chaves (loan)	2024–25	Liga Portugal 2	15	0	—		—		—		—		15	0
Career total			195	19	24	1	0	0	8	1	4	0	231	21

== Honours ==
Granada

- Segunda División: 2022–23
