= Kellyan =

Spanish footballer (born 1998)

Personal information
- Full name: Kellyan Francisco García Leal
- Date of birth: 14 August 1998 (age 28)
- Place of birth: Catral, Spain
- Height: 1.94 m (6 ft 4 in)
- Position: Goalkeeper

Team information
- Current team: Don Benito

Youth career
- 2007–2012: Elche
- 2012–2017: Málaga

Senior career*
Years	Team	Apps	(Gls)
2017–2021	Málaga B	51	(0)
2019–2021	Málaga	2	(0)
2020–2021	→ Ibiza (loan)	2	(0)
2021–2022	El Palo	27	(0)
2022–2023	Ibiza Islas Pitiusas	3	(0)
2023	Atlético Paso	15	(0)
2023–2024	Llerenense	26	(0)
2024–2025	Coria	25	(0)
2025–	Don Benito	4	(0)
- * Club domestic league appearances and goals as of 28 September 2025

Kellyan Francisco García Leal (born 14 August 1998), simply known as Kellyan, is a Spanish footballer who plays as a goalkeeper for Tercera Federación club Don Benito.

== Club career ==
Born in Catral, Alicante, Valencian Community, Kellyan joined Málaga CF's youth setup in 2012, from Elche CF. He made his senior debut with the reserves on 13 September 2017, starting in a 3–0 Tercera División away defeat of CD Melistar.

On 7 September 2019, as starter Munir was on international duty, Kellyan made his first team debut by playing the full 90 minutes in a 0–1 home loss against UD Almería, in the Segunda División. The following 19 August, he renewed his contract until 2022 and was immediately loaned to Segunda División B side UD Ibiza for the campaign.

Kellyan was a backup to Germán Parreño as Ibiza achieved a first-ever promotion to the second division. On 7 August 2021, he signed for El Palo FC of the Tercera División RFEF.
