= Ismael Casas =

Spanish footballer (born 2001)

Personal information
- Full name: Ismael Casas Casado
- Date of birth: 7 March 2001 (age 25)
- Place of birth: Linares, Spain
- Height: 1.74 m (5 ft 9 in)
- Position: Right back

Team information
- Current team: IMT
- Number: 45

Youth career
- Almidas Cástulo
- 2013–2018: Málaga

Senior career*
Years	Team	Apps	(Gls)
2018–2020	Málaga B	39	(0)
2019–2022	Málaga	43	(0)
2022–2024	AEK Larnaca	30	(0)
2024–2025	Fuenlabrada	30	(1)
2025–	IMT	29	(0)

International career
2018–2019	Spain U18	9	(0)
2020	Spain U19	1	(0)
2019	Spain U20	5	(0)
- * Club domestic league appearances and goals as of 13 June 2026

Ismael Casas Casado (born 7 March 2001) is a Spanish footballer who plays as a right back for Serbian SuperLiga club IMT.

== Club career ==
Born in Linares, Jaén, Andalusia, Casas joined Málaga CF's youth setup in July 2013, from CD Almidas Cástulo. He made his senior debut with the reserves on 2 September 2018, starting in a 1–3 away loss against Marbella FC.

Casas finished his first senior season with 27 appearances, as his side suffered relegation. He made his professional debut on 17 August 2019, starting in a 1–0 away win against Racing de Santander.

On 11 July 2020, Casas renewed his contract with Málaga until 2023. On 9 June 2022, he left the club to join compatriot José Luis Oltra at Cypriot club AEK Larnaca FC.

== Career statistics ==
As of 21 May 2024

Club	Season	League			Cup		Continental		Other		Total	
Club	Season	Division	Apps	Goals	Apps	Goals	Apps	Goals	Apps	Goals	Apps	Goals
Málaga	2019–20	Segunda División	12	0	1	0	—		—		13	0
Málaga	2020–21	Segunda División	19	0	0	0	—		—		19	0
Málaga	2021–22	Segunda División	12	0	2	0	—		—		14	0
Málaga	Total		43	0	3	0	—		—		46	0
AEK Larnaca	2022–23	Cypriot First Division	26	0	0	0	6	0	—		32	0
AEK Larnaca	2023–24	Cypriot First Division	4	0	1	0	3	1	—		8	1
AEK Larnaca	Total		30	0	1	0	9	1	0	0	40	1
Career total			73	0	4	0	9	1	0	0	86	1
