= Maximiliano Villa =

Uruguayan footballer (born 1997)

Maxi Villa
Personal information
- Full name: Maximiliano Agustín Villa Pereira
- Date of birth: 3 March 1997 (age 29)
- Place of birth: Montevideo, Uruguay
- Height: 1.84 m (6 ft 0 in)
- Positions: Centre-back; right-back

Team information
- Current team: Atlético Tucumán
- Number: 3

Youth career
- Nacional

Senior career*
Years	Team	Apps	(Gls)
2017–2019	Nacional B	0	(0)
2017–2018	→ Peralada (loan)	33	(1)
2019	Peralada	16	(0)
2019–2021	Girona	0	(0)
2019–2020	→ Ponferradina (loan)	5	(0)
2020–2021	→ Villarreal B (loan)	12	(0)
2021–2022	Girona B		
2022–2023	Boston River	27	(1)
2023–2025	Torque	74	(3)
2025–	Atlético Tucumán	29	(2)
- * Club domestic league appearances and goals as of 17:29, 9 November 2026 (UTC)

Maximiliano Agustín "Maxi" Villa Pereira (born 3 March 1997) is an Uruguayan footballer who plays as a defender for Argentine Primera División club Atlético Tucumán.

== Club career ==
Born in Montevideo, Villa finished his formation with Nacional. On 14 July 2017, he was loaned to Girona FC for one year and was immediately assigned to the reserves in Segunda División B.

Villa made his senior debut on 20 August 2017, starting in a 0–1 home loss against RCD Mallorca. He scored his first goal on 22 October, netting the second in a 2–0 home defeat of SCR Peña Deportiva.

Villa made his first team debut for the Catalans on 28 November 2017, starting in a 1–1 away draw against Levante UD, for the season's Copa del Rey. It was his only appearance with the main squad, and he returned to his parent club when his loan ended in July 2018.

On 30 January 2019, Villa returned to Girona and its B-side, signing a permanent 18-month contract. On 16 August, he moved to Segunda División side SD Ponferradina on loan for one year.

On 21 September 2020, after featuring rarely, Villa joined Villarreal CF B in the third division on loan for the season.
