= Claudio Medina =

Spanish footballer

Personal information
- Full name: Claudio Medina Ricoy
- Date of birth: 4 September 1993 (age 33)
- Place of birth: León, Spain
- Height: 1.86 m (6 ft 1 in)
- Position: Forward

Team information
- Current team: Caudal

Youth career
- 2000–2005: Casa León
- 2005–2007: Cultural Leonesa
- 2007–2008: Huracán Z
- 2008–2012: Peña

Senior career*
Years	Team	Apps	(Gls)
2012–2014	La Bañeza	66	(15)
2014–2015	Numancia B	30	(7)
2015–2016	Langreo	36	(28)
2016–2018	Sporting B	75	(40)
2018–2020	Elche	17	(0)
2018–2019	→ Mirandés (loan)	35	(12)
2020–2022	Burgos	36	(6)
2022–2023	Cultural Leonesa	27	(2)
2023–2024	Real Avilés	31	(9)
2024–	Caudal	33	(19)
- * Club domestic league appearances and goals as of 22 November 2025

Claudio Medina Ricoy (born 4 September 1993) is a Spanish footballer who plays as a forward for Tercera Federación club Caudal.

== Club career ==
Born in León, Castile and León, Medina represented Casa Club León FC, Cultural y Deportiva Leonesa, CD Huracán Z and CDF Peña as a youth. In 2012, after finishing his formation, he signed for Tercera División side La Bañeza FC.

On 14 July 2014, Medina joined CD Numancia and was assigned to the reserves also in the fourth division. On 21 July of the following year, he moved to fellow league team UP Langreo, and scored a career-best 28 goals during the campaign.

On 25 July 2016, Medina agreed to a contract with another reserve team, Sporting de Gijón B still in division four. He again netted 28 times in 2016–17, as his team achieved promotion to Segunda División B, and scored a further 12 in 2017–18 as they missed a consecutive promotion in the play-offs.

On 24 July 2018, Medina signed for Segunda División side Elche CF, but was loaned to CD Mirandés in the third level on 28 August. He was also a regular starter for the latter club, again scoring 12 goals as the Rojillos achieved promotion to the second division.

Upon returning to the Franjiverdes, Medina was included in the first team squad and made his professional debut on 8 September 2019, coming on as a late substitute for Yacine Qasmi in a 1–1 home draw against CD Lugo.

On 2 October 2020, after contributing with 18 appearances overall during the season as his side achieved promotion to La Liga, Medina terminated his contract with Elche, and joined Burgos CF in the third division just hours later.

On 13 July 2022, Medina returned to Cultural, now being assigned to the first team in Primera Federación.
