= Pichu Atienza =

Spanish footballer

Personal information
- Full name: Francisco Javier Atienza Valverde
- Date of birth: 18 January 1990 (age 36)
- Place of birth: Cañete de las Torres, Spain
- Height: 1.90 m (6 ft 3 in)
- Position: Centre back

Team information
- Current team: La Nucía

Youth career
- 2003–2007: Atlético Madrid

Senior career*
Years	Team	Apps	(Gls)
2007–2008	Atlético Madrid C	33	(3)
2008–2011	Atlético Madrid B	68	(2)
2011–2013	Sevilla B	65	(2)
2013–2014	Huesca	33	(2)
2014–2016	Hércules	76	(5)
2016–2018	Reus	73	(1)
2018–2019	Numancia	38	(2)
2019–2021	Zaragoza	46	(2)
2021–2024	Asteras Tripolis	57	(2)
2024–2025	Alcoyano	33	(1)
2025–	La Nucía	0	(0)

International career
2006–2007	Spain U17	11	(2)
Medal record
Men's football
Representing Spain
European U-17 Championship
Winner	2007 Belgium
- * Club domestic league appearances and goals as of 10 June 2025

Francisco Javier 'Pichu' Atienza Valverde (born 18 January 1990) is a Spanish professional footballer who plays for Tercera Federación club La Nucía as a central defender.

== Club career ==
Atienza was born in Cañete de las Torres, Córdoba, Andalusia, and joined Atlético Madrid's youth setup in 2003. After making his senior debut for the C-team in Tercera División, he was promoted to the reserves in 2008, spending several campaigns in Segunda División B.

On 18 July 2011 Atienza joined another reserve team, Sevilla Atlético also in the third level. He continued to appear in the category in the following years, representing SD Huesca and Hércules CF.

On 7 July 2016, Atienza signed a two-year contract with CF Reus Deportiu, newly promoted to Segunda División. He made his professional debut on 20 August, starting in a 1–0 away win against RCD Mallorca.

On 16 June 2018, Atienza signed a two-year contract with fellow second division side CD Numancia. On 4 July of the following year, he agreed to a three-year deal with Real Zaragoza, still in the second level.

On 7 July 2021, Pichu was announced by the Greek Super League side Asteras Tripolis, on a contract until June 2023.

== Honours ==
Spain U17

- UEFA European Under-17 Championship: 2007
