= 2020 Segunda División play-offs =

Segunda División play-offs
- Season: 2019–20
- Promoted: Elche
- Matches: 6
- Goals: 6 (1 per match)

The 2019–20 Segunda División play-offs were played from 13 August to 23 August 2020 and determined the third team promoted to La Liga for the following season. Teams placed between 3rd and 6th position took part in the promotion play-offs.

== Regulations ==
The regulations were the same as the previous season: in the semi-finals, the fifth-placed team faced the fourth-placed team, while the sixth-placed team faced the third. Each tie was played over two legs, with the team lower in the table hosting the first leg.

The team that scored more goals on aggregate over the two legs advanced to the next round. If the aggregate score was level, the away goals rule was applied (i.e., the team that scored more goals away from home over the two legs advanced). If away goals were also equal, then thirty minutes of extra time would be played. The away goals rule would again be applied after extra time (i.e., if there were goals scored during extra time and the aggregate score was still level, the visiting team advanced by virtue of more away goals scored). If no goals were scored during extra time, the winner would be the best positioned team in the regular season.

== Road to the play-offs ==
Pos	Team	Pld	W	D	L	GF	GA	GD	Pts	Promotion, qualification or relegation
3	Zaragoza	42	18	11	13	59	53	+6	65	Qualification to promotion play-offs
4	Almería	42	17	13	12	62	43	+19	64	Qualification to promotion play-offs
5	Girona	42	17	12	13	48	43	+5	63	Qualification to promotion play-offs
6	Elche (O, P)	42	16	13	13	52	44	+8	61	Qualification to promotion play-offs

Source: LaLiga Soccerway
Rules for classification: 1) points; 2) head-to-head points; 3) head-to-head goal difference; 4) goal difference; 5) number of goals scored
(O) Play-off winners; (P) Promoted

== Bracket ==
Semi-finals
Elche	0	1	1
Zaragoza	0	0	0
Girona	1	2	3
Almería	0	1	1

Final
Elche	0	1	1
Girona	0	0	0

=== Semi-finals ===
Team 1	Agg.	Team 2	1st leg	2nd leg
Elche	1–0	Zaragoza	0–0	1–0
Girona	3–1	Almería	1–0	2–1

First leg

13 August 2020	Girona	1–0	Almería	Girona
19:30 UTC+2	Stuani 54'	Report		Stadium: Montilivi; Attendance: 0 Referee: Javier Iglesias Villanueva

13 August 2020	Elche	0–0	Zaragoza	Elche
22:00 UTC+2		Report		Stadium: Martínez Valero; Attendance: 0 Referee: Rubén Ávalos Barrera

Second leg

16 August 2020	Almería	1–2	Girona	Almería
19:00 UTC+2	Lazo 26'	Report	Samu Saiz 4'; Stuani 84'	Stadium: Juegos Mediterráneos; Attendance: 0 Referee: Isidro Díaz de Mera Escuderos

16 August 2020	Zaragoza	0–1	Elche	Zaragoza
22:00 UTC+2		Report	Nino 81'	Stadium: La Romareda; Attendance: 0 Referee: Jorge Figueroa Vázquez

=== Final ===
Team 1	Agg.	Team 2	1st leg	2nd leg
Elche	1–0	Girona	0–0	1–0

First leg

20 August 2020	Elche	0–0	Girona	Elche
22:00 UTC+2		Report		Stadium: Martínez Valero; Attendance: 0 Referee: Dámaso Arcediano Monescillo

Second leg

23 August 2020	Girona	0–1	Elche	Girona
22:00 UTC+2		Report	Pere Milla 90+6'	Stadium: Montilivi; Attendance: 0 Referee: José Antonio López Toca
