= 2026–27 Elche CF season =

104th season in existence of Elche CF

Elche
2026–27 season
- Owner: Christian Bragarnik
- President: Joaquín Buitrago
- Head coach: Martín Anselmi
- Stadium: Estadio Martínez Valero
- La Liga: 15th
- Copa del Rey: Second round
- Top goalscorer: League: Fer Niño (6); All: Fer Niño (6)
- Highest home attendance: 30,704 (v. Barcelona, La Liga, 23 August 2026)
- Lowest home attendance: 25,470 (v. Celta, La Liga, 11 October 2026)
- Average home league attendance: 28,096
- Biggest win: 3–0 v. Rayo Vallecano (A); La Liga, 24 October 2026
- Biggest defeat: 0–5 v. Barcelona (H); La Liga, 23 August 2026

The 2026–27 season is the 104th season in the history of Elche Club de Fútbol, and the club's second consecutive season in La Liga following promotion from the Segunda División in the 2024–25 season. In addition to the domestic league, the club is also participating in the Copa del Rey.

At the end of the previous season, head coach Eder Sarabia resigned from his position, citing personal reasons. Martín Anselmi was subsequently appointed in his place, signing a one-year contract.

== Squad ==
As of 26 October 2026

No.	Player	Position	Nationality	Date of birth (age)	Signed from	Since
Goalkeepers
1	Matías Dituro (3rd captain)	GK	(Argentina)	8 May 1987 (age 39)	(Turkey) Fatih Karagümrük	2024
13	Alejandro Iturbe	GK	(Spain)	2 September 2003 (age 23)	(Spain) Atlético Madrid B	2025
Defenders
2	Buba Sangaré	RB	(Spain)	6 August 2007 (age 19)	(Italy) Roma	2026
3	Roy Revivo	LB	(Israel)	22 May 2003 (age 23)	(Israel) Maccabi Tel Aviv	2026
4	Bambo Diaby	CB	(Senegal)	17 December 1997 (age 28)	(England) Sheffield Wednesday	2024
6	Pedro Bigas (vice-captain)	CB	(Spain)	15 May 1990 (age 36)	(Spain) Eibar	2021
15	Kevin Lomónaco	CB	(Argentina)	8 January 2002 (age 24)	(Argentina) Independiente	2026
22	Rubén Sánchez	RB	(Spain)	4 February 2001 (age 25)	(Spain) Espanyol	2026
23	Víctor Chust	CB	(Spain)	5 March 2000 (age 26)	(Spain) Cádiz	2025
26	Matía Barzic	CB	(Croatia)	31 May 2004 (age 22)	(Spain) Elche Ilicitano	2026
Midfielders
5	Federico Redondo	DM	(Argentina)	18 January 2003 (age 23)	(United States) Inter Miami	2025
7	Yago Santiago	LM	(Spain)	15 April 2003 (age 23)	(England) Tottenham Hotspur	2024
8	Marc Aguado	DM	(Spain)	22 February 2000 (age 26)	(Spain) Zaragoza	2025
11	Germán Valera	RM	(Spain)	16 March 2002 (age 24)	(Spain) Valencia	2025
12	Gonzalo Villar	CM	(Spain)	23 March 1998 (age 28)	(Croatia) Dinamo Zagreb	2026
16	Martim Neto	CM	(Portugal)	14 January 2003 (age 23)	(Portugal) Benfica	2025
17	Josan (captain)	RM	(Spain)	3 December 1989 (age 36)	(Spain) Albacete	2018
18	Thomas Lemar	CM	(France)	12 November 1995 (age 31)	(Spain) Atlético Madrid (on loan)	2026
19	Grady Diangana	RM	(Democratic Republic of the Congo)	19 April 1998 (age 28)	(England) West Bromwich Albion	2025
29	Ali Houary	AM	(Morocco)	5 August 2005 (age 21)	(Spain) Elche Ilicitano	2023
32	Adam Boayar	AM	(Morocco)	13 October 2005 (age 21)	(Spain) Elche Ilicitano	2023
47	Javi Morcillo	CM	(Spain)	15 March 2006 (age 20)	(Spain) Atlético Madrid	2026
Forwards
9	Ezequiel Ponce	CF	(Argentina)	29 March 1997 (age 29)	(United States) Houston Dynamo	2026
10	Facundo Buonanotte	CF	(Argentina)	23 December 2004 (age 21)	(England) Brighton and Hove Albion (on loan)	2026
14	Fer Niño	CF	(Spain)	24 October 2000 (age 26)	(Spain) Burgos	2026
20	Tete Morente	LW	(Spain)	4 December 1996 (age 29)	(Italy) Lecce	2026
21	Lucas Cepeda	LW	(Chile)	31 October 2002 (age 24)	(Chile) Colo-Colo	2026
24	Abiel Osorio	CF	(Argentina)	13 June 2002 (age 24)	(Argentina) Defensa y Justicia	2026

== Transfers ==
=== In ===
Date	Pos.	No.	Player	From	Fee	Ref.
29 May 2026	CM	12	(Spain) Gonzalo Villar	(Croatia) Dinamo Zagreb	€1,000,000	
3 June 2026	RB	2	(Spain) Buba Sangaré	(Italy) Roma	€4,500,000	
1 July 2026	CB	23	(Spain) Víctor Chust	(Spain) Cádiz	€1,000,000	
29 July 2026	CF	14	(Spain) Fer Niño	(Spain) Burgos	€4,000,000	
6 August 2026	CM	47	(Spain) Javi Morcillo	(Spain) Atlético Madrid	€1,500,000	
18 August 2026	CF	9	(Argentina) Ezequiel Ponce	(United States) Houston Dynamo	Undisclosed	
1 September 2026	RB	22	(Spain) Rubén Sánchez	(Spain) Espanyol	€500,000	
1 September 2026	LB	3	(Israel) Roy Revivo	(Israel) Maccabi Tel Aviv	€2,800,000	
1 September 2026	CB	15	(Argentina) Kevin Lomónaco	(Argentina) Independiente	€4,800,000	
▼ Spending: €20,100,000

=== Out ===
Date	Pos.	No.	Player	To	Fee	Ref.
1 July 2026	LB	21	(France) Léo Pétrot	(Belgium) Anderlecht	Free transfer	
1 July 2026	CM	14	(Spain) Aleix Febas	(Spain) Celta Vigo	Free transfer	
1 July 2026	CF	9	(Portugal) André Silva	(Portugal) Porto	Free transfer	
14 July 2026	CF	20	(Uruguay) Álvaro Rodríguez	(England) Bournemouth	€25,000,000	
1 September 2026	CB	22	(Austria) David Affengruber	(England) Fulham	€10,000,000	
▲ Income: €35,500,000

=== Loans in ===
Date	Pos.	No.	Player	From	Date until	Ref.
7 August 2026	CF	10	(Argentina) Facundo Buonanotte	(England) Brighton and Hove Albion	End of season	
1 September 2026	CM	18	(France) Thomas Lemar	(Spain) Atlético Madrid	End of season	

=== Loans out ===
Date	Pos.	No.	Player	To	Date until	Ref.
31 August 2026	CB	18	(Spain) John Chetauya	(Spain) Mallorca	End of season	
1 September 2026	CF	26	(Spain) Umaru Konare	(Spain) Ceuta	End of season	

=== New contracts ===
Date	Pos.	No.	Player	Until	Ref.
24 July 2026	RM	17	(Spain) Josan	2027	
18 August 2026	CF	–	(Spain) Umaru Konare	2030	
24 September 2026	AM	29	(Morocco) Ali Houary	2030	

== Pre-season and friendlies ==
18 July 2026 1	Kaizer Chiefs	1–2	Elche	San Pedro del Pinatar
19:00 CEST (UTC+2)	Velebayi 59'	Report	Houary 24'; Konare 45'	Stadium: Pinatar Arena

24 July 2026 2	Elche	0–0	Johor	La Nucia
19:00 CEST (UTC+2)		Report		Stadium: Camilo Cano

28 July 2026 3	Elche	2–2	Al Ain	San Pedro del Pinatar
20:00 CEST (UTC+2)	Konare 10'; Sánchez 82'	Report	Giakoumakis 38'; Bello 70'	Stadium: Pinatar Arena; Referee: Lax Franco

31 July 2026 4	Elche	2–2	Córdoba	Oliva
10:30 CEST (UTC+2)	Konare 48', 50'	Report	Ghailan 10'; Carracedo 43'	Stadium: Oliva Nova Sports Centre; Referee: Jorge Tárrega

8 August 2026 5	Elche	3–0	Toulouse	San Pedro del Pinatar
10:00 CEST (UTC+2)	Valera 14'; Diangana 83'; Niño 90+1'	Report		Stadium: Pinatar Arena; Attendance: 1,500; Referee: Rafael Sánchez López

== Competitions ==
Competition	First match	Last match	Starting round	Final position	Record							
Competition	First match	Last match	Starting round	Final position	Pld	W	D	L	GF	GA	GD	Win %
La Liga	17 August 2026	30 May 2027	Matchday 1	TBC	12	2	4	6	14	20	−6	16.67
Copa del Rey	27 October 2026	TBD	First round	TBC	0	0	0	0	0	0	+0	—
Total					12	2	4	6	14	20	−6	16.67

Source: Soccerway

=== La Liga ===
==== League table ====
Pos	Team	Pld	W	D	L	GF	GA	GD	Pts	Qualification or relegation
16	Osasuna	12	3	3	6	12	23	−11	12	
17	Levante	12	2	5	5	16	21	−5	11	
18	Elche	12	2	4	6	14	20	−6	10	Relegation to Segunda División
19	Valencia	12	2	3	7	8	20	−12	9	Relegation to Segunda División
20	Málaga	12	0	5	7	9	23	−14	5	Relegation to Segunda División

Updated to match(es) played on 8 November 2026. Source: LaLiga EA Sports
Rules for classification: 1) Points; 2) Head-to-head points; 3) Head-to-head goal difference; 4) Goal difference; 5) Goals scored; 6) Fair-play points (if three or more teams tied); 7) Play-off at neutral site.
(Note: Head-to-head record is used only after all the matches between the teams in question have been played)

==== Results summary ====
Overall								Home						Away					
Pld	W	D	L	GF	GA	GD	Pts	W	D	L	GF	GA	GD	W	D	L	GF	GA	GD
12	2	4	6	14	20	−6	10	0	1	5	4	14	−10	2	3	1	10	6	+4

Last updated: 8 November 2026.
Source: La Liga

==== Results by round ====
Round	1	2	3	4	5	6	7	8	9	10	11	12	13	14	15	16	17	18	19	20	21	22	23	24	25	26	27	28	29	30	31	32	33	34	35	36	37	38
Ground	A	H	A	H	A	H	A	H	A	A	H	H	A	H	A	H	A	A	H	A	H	A	H	H	A	A	H	H	A	H	A	H	A	H	A	A	A	H
Result	D	L	L	L	D	L	W	D	D	W	L	L																										
Position	10	18	19	19	19	20	18	18	18	15	17																											

Updated to match(es) played on 25 October 2026. Source: La Liga
A = Away; H = Home; W = Win; D = Draw; L = Loss

==== Matches ====
The match schedule was released on 30 June 2026.

17 August 2026 1	Deportivo A Coruña	1–1	Elche	A Coruña
21:00 CEST (UTC+2)	Aubameyang 21'; Navarro (yellow card) 26'; Amatucci (yellow card) 45+1'	Report	Villar (yellow card) 67'; Aguado 76'; Konare (yellow card) 88'	Stadium: Riazor; Attendance: 29,038; Referee: Francisco Hernández Maeso

23 August 2026 2	Elche	0–5	Barcelona	Elche
21:30 CEST (UTC+2)	Houary (yellow card) 33'	Report	Raphinha 14' (pen.), 67'; Adeyemi 45+3'; Fermín 71', 79'	Stadium: Martínez Valero; Attendance: 30,704; Referee: Alejandro Quintero González

28 August 2026 3	Racing de Santander	3–2	Elche	Santander
19:00 CEST (UTC+2)	Zabiri 15', 21', 36'; González (yellow card) 43'; Mantilla (yellow card) 45'	Report	Buonanotte (yellow card) 63'; Sangaré 78'; Niño 79'	Stadium: El Sardinero; Attendance: 22,496; Referee: Carlos Muñiz Muñoz

7 September 2026 4	Elche	2–3	Real Sociedad	Elche
21:30 CEST (UTC+2)	Morente (yellow card) 44'; Niño (yellow card) 57', (goal) 74'; Lemar 67', (yellow card) 90+7'; Valera (yellow card) 68'	Report	Aramburu (yellow card) 9'; Ochieng 11'; Herrera 32'; Martín (red card) 64'; Sučić 90'	Stadium: Martínez Valero; Attendance: 25,562; Referee: Miguel Ángel Ortiz Arias

12 September 2026 5	Athletic Bilbao	1–1	Elche	Bilbao
18:30 CEST (UTC+2)	Chust 79' (o.g.); Berenguer (yellow card) 81'; Gerenabarrena (yellow card) 81'; Berchiche (yellow card) 90+7'	Report	Buonanotte 50' (pen.); Redondo (yellow card) 56'; Osorio (yellow card) 75'; Sánchez (yellow card) 90+6'	Stadium: San Mamés; Attendance: 47,287; Referee: Manuel Jesús Orellana Cid

15 September 2026 6	Elche	2–3	Real Madrid	Elche
21:30 CEST (UTC+2)	Aguado (yellow card) 31'; Osorio 71'; Cepeda (yellow card) 78'; Niño 83'; Josan (yellow card) 90+3'; Villar (yellow card) 90+4'	Report	Diomande (yellow card) 4'; Dituro 25' (o.g.); Mbappé 33'; Konaté (yellow card) 73'; Espí 90+1'	Stadium: Martínez Valero; Attendance: 30,383; Referee: Jesús Gil Manzano

18 September 2026 7	Espanyol	1–3	Elche CF	Valencia
21:00 CEST (UTC+2)	Expósito (yellow card) 45+4'; Chust 72' (o.g.); Riedel (yellow card) 82'	Report	Redondo (red card) 6'; Niño (yellow card) 22', (goal) 26', 29'; Valera 78'; Cepeda (yellow card) 90+1'	Stadium: RCDE Stadium; Attendance: 26,616; Referee: Jon González Esteban

11 October 2026 8	Elche	0–0	Celta	Elche
12:00 CEST (UTC+2)	Aguado (yellow card) 90+1'	Report	Lago (yellow card) 37'; Rueda (yellow card) 59'; Febas (yellow card) 81'	Stadium: Martínez Valero; Attendance: 25,470; Referee: Javier Alberola Rojas

17 October 2026 9	Villarreal	0–0	Elche	Villarreal
15:15 CEST (UTC+2)	Freeman (yellow card) 81'; Foyth (yellow card) 90+1'	Report	Villar (yellow card) 38'; Morente (yellow card) 71'; Revivo (yellow card) 75'; Chust (yellow card) 90+1'	Stadium: Estadio de la Cerámica; Attendance: 17,329; Referee: Víctor García Verdura

24 October 2026 10	Rayo Vallecano	0–3	Elche	Madrid
14:00 CEST (UTC+2)	Ciss (yellow card) 35', (penalty missed) 39'; Pedrosa (yellow card) 54'; García (yellow card) 81'	Report	Morcillo (yellow card) 10'; Redondo 23' (pen.), (yellow card) 30'; Villar (yellow card) 30'; Niño 36' (pen.); Valera 68'	Stadium: Vallecas; Attendance: 8,405; Referee: Miguel Sesma Espinosa

1 November 2026 11	Elche	0–1	Valencia	Elche
18:30 CET (UTC+1)	Valera (yellow card) 36'; Chust (yellow card) 42'	Report	Sadiq 69'; Guerra (yellow card) 73'; Dimitrievski (yellow card) 90+1'	Stadium: Martínez Valero; Attendance: 28,360; Referee: Luis Bestard Servera

8 November 2026 12	Elche	0–2	Real Betis	Elche
14:00 CET (UTC+1)	Redondo (yellow card) 59'; Diangana (yellow card) 68'; Neto (yellow card) 82'; Morcillo (yellow card) 84'	Report	Riquelme 81'; Bartra 89'	Stadium: Martínez Valero; Attendance: 31,388; Referee: César Soto Grado

23 November 2026 13	Levante	v	Elche	Valencia
21:00 CET (UTC+1)				Stadium: Ciutat de València

29 November 2026 14	Elche	v	Atlético Madrid	Elche
--:-- CET (UTC+1)		Report		Stadium: Martínez Valero

6 December 2026 15	Osasuna	v	Elche	Pamplona
--:-- CET (UTC+1)				Stadium: El Sadar

13 December 2026 16	Elche	v	Sevilla	Elche
--:-- CET (UTC+1)		Report		Stadium: Martínez Valero

20 December 2026 17	Deportivo Alavés	v	Elche	Vitoria-Gasteiz
--:-- CET (UTC+1)				Stadium: Mendizorrotza

3 January 2027 18	Málaga	v	Elche	Málaga
--:-- CET (UTC+1)				Stadium: La Rosaleda

10 January 2027 19	Elche	v	Getafe	Elche
--:-- CET (UTC+1)				Stadium: Martínez Valero

17 January 2027 20	Barcelona	v	Elche	Barcelona
--:-- CET (UTC+1)		Report		Stadium: Camp Nou

24 January 2027 21	Elche	v	Rayo Vallecano	Elche
--:-- CET (UTC+1)				Stadium: Martínez Valero

31 January 2027 22	Real Betis	v	Elche	Seville
--:-- CET (UTC+1)				Stadium: La Cartuja

7 February 2027 23	Elche	v	Levante	Elche
--:-- CET (UTC+1)				Stadium: Martínez Valero

14 February 2027 24	Elche	v	Deportivo A Coruña	Elche
--:-- CET (UTC+1)				Stadium: Martínez Valero

21 February 2027 25	Atlético Madrid	v	Elche	Madrid
--:-- CET (UTC+1)		Report		Stadium: Riyadh Air Metropolitano

28 February 2027 26	Real Sociedad	v	Elche	San Sebastián
--:-- CET (UTC+1)				Stadium: Anoeta

7 March 2027 27	Elche	v	Málaga	Elche
--:-- CET (UTC+1)				Stadium: Martínez Valero

14 March 2027 28	Elche	v	Villarreal	Elche
--:-- CEST (UTC+2)				Stadium: Martínez Valero

21 March 2027 29	Sevilla	v	Elche	Seville
--:-- CEST (UTC+2)		Report		Stadium: Ramón Sánchez-Pizjuán

4 April 2027 30	Elche	v	Deportivo Alavés	Elche
--:-- CEST (UTC+2)				Stadium: Martínez Valero

11 April 2027 31	Celta	v	Elche	Vigo
--:-- CEST (UTC+2)				Stadium: Balaídos

18 April 2027 32	Elche	v	Osasuna	Elche
--:-- CEST (UTC+2)				Stadium: Martínez Valero

21 April 2027 33	Real Madrid	v	Elche	Madrid
--:-- CEST (UTC+2)		Report		Stadium: Bernabéu

2 May 2027 34	Elche	v	Espanyol	Elche
--:-- CEST (UTC+2)				Stadium: Martínez Valero

9 May 2027 35	Getafe	v	Elche	Getafe
--:-- CEST (UTC+2)				Stadium: Coliseum

16 May 2027 36	Athletic Bilbao	v	Elche	Bilbao
--:-- CEST (UTC+2)				Stadium: San Mamés

23 May 2027 37	Valencia	v	Elche	Valencia
--:-- CEST (UTC+2)				Stadium: Mestalla

30 May 2027 38	Elche	v	Racing de Santander	Elche
--:-- CEST (UTC+2)				Stadium: Martínez Valero

=== Copa del Rey ===
==== Matches ====
Elche entered the tournament in the first round.

27 October 2026 First round	Pinatar	1–3	Elche	San Pedro del Pinatar
19:00 CET (UTC+1)	Benhallou 18'	Report	Ponce 32', 54'; Houary 81'	Stadium: José Antonio Pérez; Attendance: 3,000; Referee: Manuel Jesús Orellana Cid
