= 2025–26 Elche CF season =

103rd season in existence of Elche CF

Elche
2025–26 season
- Owner: Christian Bragarnik
- President: Joaquín Buitrago
- Head coach: Eder Sarabia
- Stadium: Estadio Martínez Valero
- La Liga: 15th
- Copa del Rey: Round of 16
- Top goalscorer: League: André Silva (10); All: André Silva (10)
- Highest home attendance: 31,033 (v. Barcelona, La Liga, 31 January 2026)
- Lowest home attendance: 21,253 (v. Osasuna, La Liga, 13 February 2026)
- Average home league attendance: 26,537
- Biggest win: 4–0 v. Los Garres (A); Copa del Rey, 29 October 2025; 4–0 v. Rayo Vallecano (H); La Liga, 21 December 2025
- Biggest defeat: 1–4 v. Real Madrid (A); La Liga, 14 March 2026
Home colours	Away colours	Third colours

The 2025–26 season was the 103rd season in the history of Elche Club de Fútbol, and the club's first season back in La Liga since the 2022–23 season, following promotion from the Segunda División in the previous campaign. In addition to the domestic league, the club also participated in the Copa del Rey.

On 10 June 2025, manager Eder Sarabia extended his contract with Elche until 2027.

== Squad ==
As of 2 February 2026

No.	Player	Position	Nationality	Date of birth (age)	Signed from	Since
Goalkeepers
1	Matías Dituro (3rd captain)	GK	(Argentina)	8 May 1987 (age 39)	(Turkey) Fatih Karagümrük	2024
13	Iñaki Peña	GK	(Spain)	2 March 1999 (age 27)	(Spain) Barcelona (on loan)	2025
45	Alejandro Iturbe	GK	(Spain)	2 September 2003 (age 23)	(Spain) Atlético Madrid B	2025
Defenders
3	Adrià Pedrosa	LB	(Spain)	13 May 1998 (age 28)	(Spain) Sevilla (on loan)	2025
6	Pedro Bigas (captain)	CB	(Spain)	15 May 1990 (age 36)	(Spain) Eibar	2021
18	John Donald	CB	(Spain)	25 September 2000 (age 26)	(Spain) Villarreal C	2020
21	Léo Pétrot	LB	(France)	15 April 1997 (age 29)	(France) Saint-Étienne	2025
22	David Affengruber (5th captain)	CB	(Austria)	19 March 2001 (age 25)	(Austria) Sturm Graz	2024
23	Víctor Chust	CB	(Spain)	5 March 2000 (age 26)	(Spain) Cádiz (on loan)	2025
39	Héctor Fort	RB	(Spain)	2 August 2006 (age 20)	(Spain) Barcelona (on loan)	2025
42	Buba Sangaré	RB	(Spain)	6 August 2007 (age 19)	(Italy) Roma (on loan)	2026
Midfielders
5	Federico Redondo	DM	(Argentina)	18 January 2003 (age 23)	(United States) Inter Miami	2025
7	Yago Santiago	LM	(Spain)	15 April 2003 (age 23)	(England) Tottenham Hotspur	2024
8	Marc Aguado	DM	(Spain)	22 February 2000 (age 26)	(Spain) Zaragoza	2025
11	Germán Valera	RM	(Spain)	16 March 2002 (age 24)	(Spain) Valencia	2025
12	Gonzalo Villar	CM	(Spain)	23 March 1998 (age 28)	(Croatia) Dinamo Zagreb (on loan)	2026
14	Aleix Febas (4th captain)	CM	(Spain)	2 February 1996 (age 30)	(Spain) Málaga	2023
16	Martim Neto	CM	(Portugal)	14 January 2003 (age 23)	(Portugal) Benfica	2025
17	Josan (vice-captain)	RM	(Spain)	3 December 1989 (age 36)	(Spain) Albacete	2018
19	Grady Diangana	RM	(Democratic Republic of the Congo)	19 April 1998 (age 28)	(England) West Bromwich Albion	2025
32	Adam Boayar	AM	(Morocco)	13 October 2005 (age 21)	(Spain) Elche Ilicitano	2023
Forwards
9	André Silva	CF	(Portugal)	6 November 1995 (age 31)	(Germany) RB Leipzig	2025
10	Rafa Mir	CF	(Spain)	1 June 1997 (age 29)	(Spain) Sevilla (on loan)	2025
15	Tete Morente	LW	(Spain)	4 December 1996 (age 29)	(Italy) Lecce	2026
20	Álvaro Rodríguez	CF	(Uruguay)	14 July 2004 (age 22)	(Spain) Real Madrid	2025
24	Lucas Cepeda	LW	(Chile)	31 October 2002 (age 24)	(Chile) Colo-Colo	2026

== Transfers and contracts ==
=== In ===
Date	Pos.	No.	Player	From	Fee	Ref.
3 July 2025	RM	11	(Spain) Germán Valera	(Spain) Valencia	Free transfer	
11 July 2025	LB	21	(France) Léo Pétrot	(France) Saint-Étienne	Free transfer	
16 July 2025	GK	45	(Spain) Alejandro Iturbe	(Spain) Atlético Madrid B	Free transfer	
22 July 2025	CF	20	(Uruguay) Álvaro Rodríguez	(Spain) Real Madrid	€2,000,000	
30 July 2025	CM	16	(Portugal) Martim Neto	(Portugal) Benfica	€1,500,000	
14 August 2025	DM	5	(Argentina) Federico Redondo	(United States) Inter Miami	€2,150,000	
18 August 2025	CF	9	(Portugal) André Silva	(Germany) RB Leipzig	€1,000,000	
30 August 2025	RM	19	(Democratic Republic of the Congo) Grady Diangana	(England) West Bromwich Albion	Free transfer	
11 January 2026	CF	–	(Argentina) Abiel Osorio	(Argentina) Defensa y Justicia	Free transfer	
26 January 2026	LW	24	(Chile) Lucas Cepeda	(Chile) Colo-Colo	€1,850,000	
2 February 2026	LW	15	(Spain) Tete Morente	(Italy) Lecce	Free transfer	
▼ Spending: €6,650,000

=== Out ===
Date	Pos.	No.	Player	To	Fee	Ref.
24 June 2025	AM	–	(England) Daniel Fitzgerald	(Spain) Atlético Madrid Juvenil	€150,000	
26 June 2025	AM	21	(Argentina) Nicolás Castro	(Mexico) Toluca	€5,000,000	
30 June 2025	GK	1	(Spain) Miguel San Román	(Spain) Leganés	Free transfer	
30 June 2025	CB	2	(Spain) Mario Gaspar	Free agent	Free transfer	
30 June 2025	AM	7	(Spain) Óscar Plano	(Spain) Leganés	Free transfer	
30 June 2025	LW	11	(Kosovo) Elbasan Rashani	(Australia) Melbourne City	Free transfer	
30 June 2025	LB	12	(Spain) José Salinas	(Spain) Espanyol	Free transfer	
30 June 2025	CB	16	(Spain) Álex Martín	(Spain) Córdoba	Free transfer	
11 July 2025	AM	10	(Argentina) Nicolás Fernández	(United States) New York City	€8,000,000	
1 September 2025	LB	3	(Spain) Jairo Izquierdo	(Cyprus) AEK Larnaca	Free transfer	
9 September 2025	CF	19	(Morocco) Mourad El Ghezouani	(Mexico) Tijuana	€1,500,000	
2 February 2026	CB	15	(Spain) Álvaro Núñez	(Spain) Celta Vigo	€1,000,000	
2 February 2026	CM	30	(Spain) Rodri Mendoza	(Spain) Atlético Madrid	€16,000,000	
▲ Income: €31,650,000

=== Loans in ===
Date	Pos.	No.	Player	From	Date until	Ref.
7 August 2025	CB	23	(Spain) Víctor Chust	(Spain) Cádiz	End of season	
17 August 2025	CF	10	(Spain) Rafa Mir	(Spain) Sevilla	End of season	
27 August 2025	GK	13	(Spain) Iñaki Peña	(Spain) Barcelona	End of season	
1 September 2025	LB	3	(Spain) Adrià Pedrosa	(Spain) Sevilla	End of season	
1 September 2025	RB	39	(Spain) Héctor Fort	(Spain) Barcelona	End of season	
31 January 2026	CM	12	(Spain) Gonzalo Villar	(Croatia) Dinamo Zagreb	End of season	
2 January 2026	RB	42	(Spain) Buba Sangaré	(Italy) Roma	End of season	

=== Loans out ===
Date	Pos.	No.	Player	To	Date until	Ref.
6 August 2025	LW	33	(Senegal) Bakary Traoré	(Spain) Tarazona	End of season	
15 August 2025	CB	26	(Croatia) Matía Barzic	(Spain) Cultural Leonesa	End of season	
18 August 2025	CM	29	(Spain) Luis Roldán	(Spain) Unionistas	End of season	
1 September 2025	LW	36	(Dominican Republic) Rafael Núñez	(Spain) Eldense	End of season	
11 January 2026	CF	–	(Argentina) Abiel Osorio	(Argentina) Defensa y Justicia	End of season	
22 January 2026	AM	35	(Morocco) Ali Houary	(Spain) Mirandés	End of season	
29 January 2026	CB	4	(Senegal) Bambo Diaby	(Spain) Granada	End of season	

=== New contracts ===
Date	Pos.	No.	Player	Until	Ref.
4 July 2025	GK	1	(Argentina) Matías Dituro	2026	
4 July 2025	RM	17	(Spain) Josan	2026	
6 August 2025	LW	33	(Senegal) Bakary Traoré	2027	
20 August 2025	CM	30	(Spain) Rodri Mendoza	2028	

== Pre-season and friendlies ==
On 2 July 2025, Elche announced they will be playing against Getafe in Torre-Pacheco as their pre-season programme. Five days later, a second friendly was confirmed against Blackburn Rovers in San Pedro del Pinatar. Two extra friendlies against Millwall and Almería were later announced on 8 July 2025. A week later, another friendly match and the 64th edition of the Festa d'Elx Trophy were confirmed to be both against Hércules. On 24 July 2025, the final two friendly matches against Al-Ahli and Al Ain were added to their pre-season fixtures. On 21 August 2025, Elche announced their participation in the Enrique Roca Trophy against Murcia on 4 September during the international break. An additional friendly against Premier League club Aston Villa was organised for the March 2026 international break.

Win Draw Loss Fixtures

18 July 2025 Friendly	Elche (Spain)	2–1	(England) Millwall	San Pedro del Pinatar, Spain
10:30 CEST	Trialist (yellow card) 19'; Houary 67'; Trialist (yellow card) 75'; Traoré 87'	Report	Emakhu 62'; Ivanović (yellow card) 72'; Trialist (yellow card) 90+2'	Stadium: Pinatar Arena

23 July 2025 Friendly	Hércules (Spain)	2–0	(Spain) Elche	Alicante, Spain
20:30 CEST	Trialist (yellow card) 27'; Soldevila 59'; Guti 80'	Report	Trialist (yellow card) 28'	Stadium: Estadio José Rico Pérez

25 July 2025 Friendly	Blackburn Rovers (England)	1–0	(Spain) Elche	San Pedro del Pinatar, Spain
19:00 CEST	Travis (yellow card) 25'; Cantwell (yellow card) 27'; De Neve (yellow card) 60'; Gueye (yellow card) 63', (goal) 69'; Buckley (yellow card) 90'	Report	Á. Núñez (yellow card) 25'; Barzic (yellow card) 86'	Stadium: Pinatar Arena; Referee: Charles Guilleve (Scotland)

30 July 2025 Friendly	Elche (Spain)	2–1	(Spain) Getafe	Torre-Pacheco, Spain
10:00 CEST	Rodríguez 3'; Mourad 85'	Report	Neyou (yellow card) 20'; Mayoral 54'	Stadium: La Torre Golf Resort

1 August 2025 Friendly	Elche (Spain)	0–2	(Saudi Arabia) Al-Ahli	San Pedro del Pinatar, Spain
10:30 CEST	Trialist (yellow card) 66'	Report	Al-Buraikan 21'; Trialist (yellow card) 64'; Trialist (yellow card) 86'; Toney 90+1' (pen.)	Stadium: Pinatar Arena

2 August 2025 Friendly	Elche (Spain)	3–4	(United Arab Emirates) Al Ain	San Pedro del Pinatar, Spain
10:00 CEST	Mendoza 6'; Mourad 49'; Rodríguez 54'; Trialist (yellow card) 83'	Report	Rahimi 11'; Jašić 18'; Trialist (yellow card) 52'; Laba 55'; Sarki 89'	Stadium: Pinatar Arena

8 August 2025 Friendly	Almería (Spain)	0–1	(Spain) Elche	Lorca, Spain
19:30 CEST		Report	Rodríguez 28'	Stadium: Estadio Francisco Artés Carrasco

9 August 2025 Festa d'Elx Trophy	Elche (Spain)	1–0	(Spain) Hércules	Elche, Spain
20:30 CEST	Febas 58'	Report	Trialist (yellow card) 12'; Trialist (yellow card) 24'; Trialist (yellow card) 45'; Trialist (yellow card) 53'	Stadium: Estadio Martínez Valero

4 September 2025 Enrique Roca Trophy	Murcia (Spain)	3–1	(Spain) Elche	Murcia, Spain
20:30 CEST	León 4'; Trialist (yellow card) 66'; Palmberg 82'; Benito 86'	Report	John 20'; Trialist (yellow card) 54'	Stadium: Estadio Nueva Condomina

27 March 2026 Friendly	Elche (Spain)	2–1	(England) Aston Villa	San Pedro del Pinatar, Spain
11:30 CET	Redondo 45+2'; Pétrot (yellow card) 69'; Rodríguez 90+4'	Report	Torres 21'; Buendía (yellow card) 67'	Stadium: Pinatar Arena; Attendance: 1,500

== Competitions ==
=== Overall record ===
Competition	First match	Last match	Starting round	Final position	Record							
Competition	First match	Last match	Starting round	Final position	Pld	W	D	L	GF	GA	GD	Win %
La Liga	18 August 2025	23 May 2026	Matchday 1	15th	38	10	13	15	49	57	−8	26.32
Copa del Rey	29 October 2025	14 January 2026	First round	Round of 16	4	3	0	1	8	3	+5	75.00
Total					42	13	13	16	57	60	−3	30.95

Source: Soccerway

=== La Liga ===
==== League table ====
Pos	Team	Pld	W	D	L	GF	GA	GD	Pts
13	Sevilla	38	12	7	19	46	60	−14	43 (Note: Head-to-head points: Sevilla 6, Alavés 5, Elche 3.)
14	Alavés	38	11	10	17	44	56	−12	43
15	Elche	38	10	13	15	49	57	−8	43
16	Levante	38	11	9	18	47	61	−14	42 (Note: Head-to-head points: Levante 7, Osasuna 5, Mallorca 3.)
17	Osasuna	38	11	9	18	44	50	−6	42

Source: LaLiga EA Sports
Rules for classification: 1) Points; 2) Head-to-head points; 3) Head-to-head goal difference; 4) Goal difference; 5) Goals scored; 6) Fair-play points
(Note: Head-to-head record is used only after all the matches between the teams in question have been played)

==== Results summary ====
Overall								Home						Away					
Pld	W	D	L	GF	GA	GD	Pts	W	D	L	GF	GA	GD	W	D	L	GF	GA	GD
38	10	13	15	49	57	−8	43	9	8	2	30	19	+11	1	5	13	19	38	−19

Source: Soccerway

==== Results by round ====
Round	1	2	3	4	5	6	7	8	9	10	11	12	13	14	15	16	17	18	19	20	21	22	23	24	25	26	27	28	29	30	31	33	32	34	35	36	37	38
Ground	H	A	H	A	H	A	H	A	H	A	A	H	H	A	H	A	H	H	A	H	A	H	A	H	A	H	A	A	H	A	H	H	A	A	H	A	H	A
Result	D	D	W	D	W	D	W	L	D	L	L	D	D	L	W	L	W	L	D	D	L	L	L	D	L	D	L	L	W	L	W	W	W	L	D	L	W	D
Position	9	12	7	8	5	5	4	7	7	8	9	11	10	11	9	11	9	9	9	8	11	13	15	16	17	17	17	18	17	18	18	16	14	14	14	17	17	15
Points	1	2	5	6	9	10	13	13	14	14	14	15	16	16	19	19	22	22	23	24	24	24	24	25	25	26	26	26	29	29	32	35	38	38	39	39	42	43

Source: La Liga
A = Away; H = Home; W = Win; D = Draw; L = Loss; P = Postponed

==== Matches ====
The league fixtures were released on 1 July 2025.

Win Draw Loss Fixtures

18 August 2025 1	Elche	1–1	Real Betis	Elche
21:00 CEST	Valera 81'	Report	Ruibal 21'; Natan (yellow card) 83'	Stadium: Estadio Martínez Valero; Attendance: 28,585; Referee: Víctor García Verdura

23 August 2025 2	Atlético Madrid	1–1	Elche	Madrid
19:30 CEST	Sørloth 8'	Report	Mir 15'; Febas (yellow card) 29'; Mendoza (yellow card) 45'; Dituro (yellow card) 90'	Stadium: Metropolitano Stadium; Attendance: 59,369; Referee: César Soto Grado

29 August 2025 3	Elche	2–0	Levante	Elche
19:30 CEST	Mir 46'; Mendoza 51', (yellow card) 58'	Report	De la Fuente (yellow card) 39'; Toljan (yellow card) 45+3'	Stadium: Estadio Martínez Valero; Attendance: 26,935; Referee: Iosu Galech Apezteguía

12 September 2025 4	Sevilla	2–2	Elche	Seville
21:00 CEST	Agoumé (yellow card) 8'; Romero 28', (yellow card) 44'; Nianzou (yellow card) 52'; G. Fernández 85'; Azpilicueta (yellow card) 90+3'	Report	Chust (yellow card) 44'; Silva 54'; Mir 70'; Pedrosa (yellow card) 83'; John (yellow card) 90+4'	Stadium: Ramón Sánchez-Pizjuán Stadium; Attendance: 37,331; Referee: Javier Alberola Rojas

21 September 2025 5	Elche	1–0	Real Oviedo	Elche
18:30 CEST	Silva 9'; Bigas (yellow card) 37'; Affengruber (yellow card) 38'	Report	Dendoncker (yellow card) 59'; Rondón (yellow card) 66'	Stadium: Estadio Martínez Valero; Attendance: 27,235; Referee: Miguel Sesma Espinosa

25 September 2025 6	Osasuna	1–1	Elche	Pamplona
19:30 CEST	V. Muñoz 10'; Moncayola (yellow card) 29'; Boyomo (yellow card) 45'	Report	Chust (yellow card) 32'; Pedrosa (yellow card) 86', (goal) 90+2'	Stadium: El Sadar Stadium; Attendance: 19,475; Referee: Adrián Cordero Vega

28 September 2025 7	Elche	2–1	Celta Vigo	Elche
16:15 CEST	Silva 18'; Mir (penalty missed) 54'; Josan (yellow card) 64'; John 68'; Affengruber (yellow card) 70'; Pedrosa (yellow card) 72'	Report	Mingueza (yellow card) 17'; Iglesias 22'; Lago (yellow card) 57'; Román (yellow card) 85'	Stadium: Estadio Martínez Valero; Attendance: 26,708; Referee: Guillermo Cuadra Fernández

5 October 2025 8	Alavés	3–1	Elche	Vitoria-Gasteiz
14:00 CEST	Pacheco (yellow card) 28'; Blanco (yellow card) 39'; Vicente 76' (pen.); Martínez 81'; Jonny (yellow card) 89'; Boyé 90+5'	Report	Diangana (yellow card) 40'; Affengruber (red card) 79'; Silva 90+3'	Stadium: Mendizorrotza Stadium; Attendance: 16,203; Referee: Miguel Ángel Ortiz Arias

19 October 2025 9	Elche	0–0	Athletic Bilbao	Elche
14:00 CEST	Chust (yellow card) 29'; Valera (yellow card) 44'	Report	Ruiz de Galarreta (yellow card) 61'; Jauregizar (yellow card) 83'; Vivian (yellow card) 90+4'	Stadium: Estadio Martínez Valero; Attendance: 29,043; Referee: José Luis Guzmán Mansilla

25 October 2025 10	Espanyol	1–0	Elche	Cornellà de Llobregat
16:15 CEST	Riedel (yellow card) 11'; Romero 47'; Lozano (yellow card) 64'; Milla (yellow card) 79'; Cabrera (yellow card) 88'	Report	Mir (yellow card) 39'; Núñez (yellow card) 90+1'	Stadium: RCDE Stadium; Attendance: 30,820; Referee: Ricardo de Burgos Bengoetxea

2 November 2025 11	Barcelona	3–1	Elche	Barcelona
18:30 CET	Yamal 9'; Torres 11'; Rashford 61'	Report	Neto (yellow card) 35'; Mir 42'	Stadium: Estadi Olímpic Lluís Companys; Attendance: 44,370; Referee: Miguel Sesma Espinosa

7 November 2025 12	Elche	1–1	Real Sociedad	Elche
21:00 CET	Rodríguez 57'; Affengruber (yellow card) 73'	Report	Aramburu (yellow card) 56'; Zakharyan (yellow card) 80'; Oyarzabal 89' (pen.); Gorrotxategi (yellow card) 90+5'	Stadium: Estadio Martínez Valero; Attendance: 26,242; Referee: Isidro Díaz de Mera Escuderos

23 November 2025 13	Elche	2–2	Real Madrid	Elche
21:00 CET	Febas 53', (yellow card) 89'; Affengruber (yellow card) 57'; Chust (yellow card) 68' (yellow-red card) 90+6'; Rodríguez 84'	Report	Huijsen 78'; Bellingham 87'; Mbappé (yellow card) 90+9'	Stadium: Estadio Martínez Valero; Attendance: 31,024; Referee: Francisco José Hernández Maeso

28 November 2025 14	Getafe	1–0	Elche	Getafe
21:00 CET	Milla (yellow card) 43'; Arambarri 56'; Djené (yellow card) 78'	Report	Mendoza (yellow card) 73'; Aguado (yellow card) 86'	Stadium: Estadio Coliseum; Attendance: 7,697; Referee: Alejandro Hernández Hernández

7 December 2025 15	Elche	3–0	Girona	Elche
14:00 CET	Valera 40'; Mir 51', 57'	Report	Gil (yellow card) 17'; Arango (yellow card) 85'; Martín (yellow card) 87'	Stadium: Estadio Martínez Valero; Attendance: 23,374; Referee: Miguel Sesma Espinosa

13 December 2025 16	Mallorca	3–1	Elche	Palma de Mallorca
16:15 CET	Morlanes 5', (yellow card) 20'; Mascarell (yellow card) 82', (goal) 82'; Muriqi 89'; Asano (yellow card) 90+4'	Report	Maffeo 21' (o.g.)	Stadium: Estadi Mallorca Son Moix; Attendance: 16,199; Referee: José Luis Munuera Montero

21 December 2025 17	Elche	4–0	Rayo Vallecano	Elche
18:30 CET	Fort 6'; Rodríguez 67'; Valera 70'; Febas (yellow card) 79'; Josan (yellow card) 84'; Neto 90+1'	Report	Mendy (yellow card) 22'; López (yellow card) 57'; Lejeune (yellow card) 82'	Stadium: Estadio Martínez Valero; Attendance: 23,765; Referee: Adrián Cordero Vega

3 January 2026 18	Elche	1–3	Villarreal	Elche
18:30 CET	Neto 30'; Valera (yellow card) 50'; Febas (yellow card) 66'; Bigas (yellow card) 66'	Report	Moleiro 7'; Mikautadze 13'; Pérez (yellow card) 39'; Comesaña (yellow card) 66'; Pedraza 83'; Cardona (yellow card) 88'	Stadium: Estadio Martínez Valero; Attendance: 27,078; Referee: Isidro Díaz de Mera Escuderos

10 January 2026 19	Valencia	1–1	Elche	Valencia
21:00 CET	Pepelu 87' (pen.), (yellow card) 90+4'; Ramazani (yellow card) 90+5'	Report	Núñez (yellow card) 64'; Chust (yellow card) 73'; Diangana 75'; Pedrosa (yellow card) 90+5'	Stadium: Mestalla Stadium; Attendance: 44,949; Referee: Miguel Ángel Ortiz Arias

19 January 2026 20	Elche	2–2	Sevilla	Elche
21:00 CET	Febas 14'; Chust (yellow card) 21'; Valera 55'; Santiago (yellow card) 80'; Diaby (yellow card) 90+4'	Report	Mendy (yellow card) 59'; Adams 75', 90+2' (pen.)	Stadium: Estadio Martínez Valero; Attendance: 22,594; Referee: Ricardo de Burgos Bengoetxea

23 January 2026 21	Levante	3–2	Elche	Valencia
21:00 CET	Álvarez (yellow card) 38'; Martínez 50'; De la Fuente 68'; Romero (yellow card) 84'; Matturro 90+6'	Report	Rodríguez 11'; Pétrot (yellow card) 56'; Febas (yellow card) 67'; Silva (yellow card) 71'; Adam 90+2'	Stadium: Estadi Ciutat de València; Attendance: 18,973; Referee: José Luis Munuera Montero

31 January 2026 22	Elche	1–3	Barcelona	Elche
21:00 CET	Rodríguez 29'; John (yellow card) 38'; Mendoza (yellow card) 76'	Report	Yamal 6'; Torres 40'; Rashford 72'; De Jong (yellow card) 90'	Stadium: Estadio Martínez Valero; Attendance: 31,233; Referee: Alejandro Muñiz Ruiz

7 February 2026 23	Real Sociedad	3–1	Elche	San Sebastián
21:00 CET	Sučić 24'; Oyarzabal 37'; Óskarsson 89'	Report	Affengruber (yellow card) 7'; Silva 42'; Febas (yellow card) 45+4'; Diangana (yellow card) 65'; Villar (yellow card) 87'	Stadium: Anoeta Stadium; Attendance: 30,187; Referee: José Luis Guzmán Mansilla

13 February 2026 24	Elche	0–0	Osasuna	Elche
21:00 CET	Aguado (yellow card) 37'; Morente (yellow card) 79'	Report	Budimir (yellow card) 37'; Torró (yellow card) 53'; Osambela (yellow card) 73'; Ru. García (yellow card) 85'	Stadium: Estadio Martínez Valero; Attendance: 21,253; Referee: José María Sánchez Martínez

20 February 2026 25	Athletic Bilbao	2–1	Elche	Bilbao
21:00 CET	Gómez (yellow card) 55'; Guruzeta 64', 89' (pen.); Lekue (yellow card) 67'; García (yellow card) 90+1'	Report	Febas (yellow card) 11'; Cepeda (yellow card) 45+1'; Silva 69' (pen.); Bigas (yellow card) 88'	Stadium: San Mamés Stadium; Attendance: 46,654; Referee: Alejandro Hernández Hernández

1 March 2026 26	Elche	2–2	Espanyol	Elche
14:00 CET	Aguado 42'; Mir 90' (pen.), (yellow card) 90+8'	Report	García 7'; Dolan (yellow card) 29'; González de Zárate (yellow card) 50'; Romero 57'; Expósito (yellow card) 74'; Fernández (yellow card) 77'; Pickel (yellow card) 90+5' (yellow-red card) 90+5'	Stadium: Estadio Martínez Valero; Attendance: 25,028; Referee: Iosu Galech Apezteguía

8 March 2026 27	Villarreal	2–1	Elche	Villarreal
14:00 CET	Buchanan 31'; Mouriño 41'; Moleiro (yellow card) 43'	Report	Neto (yellow card) 74'; Silva 82', (yellow card) 90+6'	Stadium: Estadio de la Cerámica; Attendance: 16,301; Referee: Víctor García Verdura

14 March 2026 28	Real Madrid	4–1	Elche	Madrid
21:00 CET	Rüdiger 39'; Valverde 44'; Camavinga (yellow card) 55'; Huijsen 66'; Güler 89'	Report	Valera (yellow card) 62'; Affengruber (yellow card) 66'; Ángel 85' (o.g.); Mir (yellow card) 88'	Stadium: Bernabéu; Attendance: 71,048; Referee: Jesús Gil Manzano

21 March 2026 29	Elche	2–1	Mallorca	Elche
14:00 CET	Chust (yellow card) 29'; Mir 62'; Morente 71'; Pétrot (yellow card) 90+7'	Report	Torre 58'; Lato (yellow card) 82'; Muriqi (penalty missed) 90+2'; Raíllo (yellow card) 90+3'; Maffeo (yellow card) 90+5'	Stadium: Estadio Martínez Valero; Attendance: 25,462; Referee: Javier Alberola Rojas

3 April 2026 30	Rayo Vallecano	1–0	Elche	Madrid
21:00 CEST	Nteka 74'	Report	Bigas (yellow card) 22' (yellow-red card) 39'; Mir (yellow card) 45'; Rodríguez (yellow card) 63'	Stadium: Vallecas Stadium; Attendance: 11,182; Referee: José Luis Munuera Montero

11 April 2026 31	Elche	1–0	Valencia	Elche
16:15 CEST	Sangaré (yellow card) 59'; Cepeda 73'	Report	Rodríguez (yellow card) 63'	Stadium: Estadio Martínez Valero; Attendance: 27,795; Referee: Francisco José Hernández Maeso

22 April 2026 33	Elche	3–2	Atlético Madrid	Elche
19:00 CEST	Affengruber 18'; Silva 33' (pen.), 75'; Febas (yellow card) 45+4'; Sangaré (yellow card) 45+4'	Report	González 10', 34'; Almada (red card) 30'; Lenglet (yellow card) 36'; Díaz (yellow card) 38'	Stadium: Estadio Martínez Valero; Attendance: 27,587; Referee: Guillermo Cuadra Fernández

26 April 2026 32	Real Oviedo	1–2	Elche	Oviedo
16:15 CEST	Fonseca (yellow card) 63'; Fernández (yellow card) 75'; Chaira 76'	Report	Bigas 6'; Villar 16'; Valera (red card) 90+5'	Stadium: Estadio Carlos Tartiere; Attendance: 25,615; Referee: José María Sánchez Martínez
Note: Fixture was initially scheduled for 19 April, but was postponed due to the Copa del Rey final.

3 May 2026 34	Celta Vigo	3–1	Elche	Vigo
14:00 CEST	Álvarez 14'; Aspas 30'; Rueda (yellow card) 41'; Lago (yellow card) 83'; Iglesias 85'	Report	Villar (yellow card) 28'; Silva 82' (pen.)	Stadium: Balaídos Stadium; Attendance: 15,401; Referee: Ricardo de Burgos Bengoetxea

9 May 2026 35	Elche	1–1	Alavés	Elche
14:00 CEST	Febas (yellow card) 50'; Rodríguez 72'; Diangana (yellow card) 88'; John (yellow card) 90+5'	Report	Ibáñez (yellow card) 12'; Blanco (yellow card) 29'; Jonny (yellow card) 33'; Martínez 51' (pen.); Diabate (yellow card) 69'; Sivera (yellow card) 78'; Abde (yellow card) 88'	Stadium: Estadio Martínez Valero; Attendance: 22,936; Referee: Mateo Busquets Ferrer

12 May 2026 36	Real Betis	2–1	Elche	Seville
20:00 CEST	Hernández 9', (yellow card) 90+3'; Fornals 68'; Llorente (yellow card) 80'; Natan (yellow card) 85'	Report	Fort 41'; Pétrot (red card) 49'; Febas (yellow card) 76'; Villar (yellow card) 78'; Valera (yellow card) 90+9'	Stadium: Estadio de La Cartuja; Attendance: 51,035; Referee: Isidro Díaz de Mera Escuderos

17 May 2026 37	Elche	1–0	Getafe	Elche
19:00 CEST	Chust 19'; Silva (yellow card) 66'; Rodríguez (yellow card) 69'; Neto (yellow card) 78'	Report	Djené (red card) 39'; Satriano (yellow card) 90+6'	Stadium: Estadio Martínez Valero; Attendance: 28,371; Referee: Víctor García Verdura

23 May 2026 38	Girona	1–1	Elche	Girona
21:00 CEST	Gil (yellow card) 45+2'; Martínez 48'; Reis (yellow card) 60'; Echeverri (yellow card) 83'; Lemar (yellow card) 85'	Report	Sangaré (yellow card) 7'; Rodríguez 39'; Affengruber (yellow card) 47'; Valera (yellow card) 85'; Aguado (yellow card) 85'	Stadium: Estadi Montilivi; Attendance: 14,019; Referee: Alejandro Hernández Hernández

=== Copa del Rey ===
As a La Liga side not competing in the Supercopa de España, Elche entered the Copa del Rey in the first round, and were drawn away against sixth-tier Preferente Autonómica de Murcia club Los Garres. In the second round, they were drawn away to fourth-tier Segunda Federación club Quintanar del Rey. They were then drawn away to Segunda División side Eibar in the round of 32, and away to La Liga club Real Betis in the round of 16.

Win Draw Loss Fixtures

29 October 2025 First round	Los Garres	0–4	Elche	Murcia
19:00 CET	Serna (yellow card) 28'; Fugas (red card) 74'	Report	Adam 18'; Neto 45+1'; Mendoza 45+4'; Redondo 76'	Stadium: Estadio Nueva Condomina; Attendance: 8,000; Referee: Mateo Busquets Ferrer
Note: Los Garres did not play the match at their home stadium, Campo Municipal Las Tejeras in Garres y Lages, as it did not meet the broadcasting requirements.

3 December 2025 Second round	Quintanar del Rey	1–2 (a.e.t.)	Elche	Quintanar del Rey
21:00 CET	Fabra (yellow card) 36'; Romero (yellow card) 55'; Iglesias 70'; Murcia (yellow card) 87'; Pérez (yellow card) 113'	Report	Houary 48'; Pedrosa (yellow card) 96'; Fort 117'	Stadium: Campo Municipal San Marcos; Attendance: 3,000; Referee: José Luis Guzmán Mansilla

16 December 2025 Round of 32	Eibar	0–1	Elche	Eibar
19:00 CET	Rodríguez (yellow card) 60'; Corpas (penalty missed) 71'; Buta (yellow card) 90+2'	Report	Adam 27'; Dituro (yellow card) 41'; John (yellow card) 47'; Houary (yellow card) 58'	Stadium: Ipurua Municipal Stadium; Attendance: 2,426; Referee: Alejandro Quintero González

14 January 2026 Round of 16	Real Betis	2–1	Elche	Seville
21:00 CET	Altimira (yellow card) 19'; Natan (yellow card) 63'; Ávila 68', 80'; Fornals (yellow card) 83'	Report	Pétrot 58'; Rodríguez (yellow card) 72'; Pedrosa (yellow card) 90+4'	Stadium: Estadio de La Cartuja; Attendance: 37,635; Referee: Jesús Gil Manzano

== Statistics ==
As of match played 22 April 2026

=== Appearances ===
Players with no appearances are not included on the list, italics indicate a loaned in player.

No.	Pos	Nat	Player	Total		La Liga		Copa del Rey	
No.	Pos	Nat	Player	Apps	Goals	Apps	Goals	Apps	Goals
1	GK	(Argentina) ARG	Matías Dituro	20	0	16+0	0	4+0	0
3	DF	(Spain) ESP	Adrià Pedrosa	25	1	6+15	1	3+1	0
5	MF	(Argentina) ARG	Federico Redondo	15	1	1+10	0	3+1	1
6	DF	(Spain) ESP	Pedro Bigas	24	0	20+3	0	0+1	0
7	MF	(Spain) ESP	Yago Santiago	14	0	3+7	0	0+4	0
8	MF	(Spain) ESP	Marc Aguado	33	1	24+5	1	1+3	0
9	FW	(Portugal) POR	André Silva	26	9	17+8	9	1+0	0
10	FW	(Spain) ESP	Rafa Mir	29	8	21+6	8	1+1	0
11	MF	(Spain) ESP	Germán Valera	32	4	29+2	4	0+1	0
12	MF	(Spain) ESP	Gonzalo Villar	6	0	2+4	0	0+0	0
13	GK	(Spain) ESP	Iñaki Peña	16	0	16+0	0	0+0	0
14	MF	(Spain) ESP	Aleix Febas	32	2	31+0	2	1+0	0
15	FW	(Spain) ESP	Tete Morente	7	1	7+0	1	0+0	0
16	MF	(Portugal) POR	Martim Neto	28	3	15+9	2	2+2	1
17	MF	(Spain) ESP	Josan	20	0	4+12	0	4+0	0
18	DF	(Spain) ESP	John Donald	18	1	5+11	1	2+0	0
19	MF	(Democratic Republic of the Congo) COD	Grady Diangana	18	1	11+6	1	0+1	0
20	FW	(Uruguay) URU	Álvaro Rodríguez	31	5	19+10	5	1+1	0
21	DF	(France) FRA	Léo Pétrot	33	1	17+12	0	3+1	1
22	DF	(Austria) AUT	David Affengruber	33	1	27+3	1	2+1	0
23	DF	(Spain) ESP	Víctor Chust	27	0	19+6	0	2+0	0
24	FW	(Chile) CHI	Lucas Cepeda	8	0	4+4	0	0+0	0
31	DF	(Spain) ESP	David Delgado	1	0	0+0	0	0+1	0
32	MF	(Morocco) MAR	Adam Boayar	11	3	0+7	1	4+0	2
36	DF	(Spain) ESP	Nico Salvador	1	0	0+0	0	1+0	0
38	MF	(Spain) ESP	Álex Sánchez	1	0	0+1	0	0+0	0
39	DF	(Spain) ESP	Héctor Fort	13	2	5+5	1	1+2	1
42	DF	(Spain) ESP	Buba Sangaré	7	0	5+2	0	0+0	0
Player(s) who featured but departed the club on loan during the season:
4	DF	(Senegal) SEN	Bambo Diaby	6	0	1+3	0	2+0	0
35	MF	(Morocco) MAR	Ali Houary	4	1	2+0	0	2+0	1
Player(s) who featured but departed the club permanently during the season:
3	DF	(Spain) ESP	Jairo Izquierdo	1	0	0+1	0	0+0	0
15	DF	(Spain) ESP	Álvaro Núñez	19	0	19+0	0	0+0	0
19	FW	(Morocco) MAR	Mourad El Ghezouani	2	0	0+2	0	0+0	0
30	MF	(Spain) ESP	Rodri Mendoza	21	2	6+11	1	4+0	1

=== Goals ===
Rank	Pos.	No.	Player	La Liga	Copa del Rey	Total
1	FW	9	(Portugal) André Silva	9	0	9
2	FW	10	(Spain) Rafa Mir	8	0	8
3	FW	20	(Uruguay) Álvaro Rodríguez	5	0	5
4	MF	11	(Spain) Germán Valera	4	0	4
5	MF	16	(Portugal) Martim Neto	2	1	3
5	MF	32	(Morocco) Adam Boayar	1	2	3
7	MF	14	(Spain) Aleix Febas	2	0	2
7	MF	30	(Spain) Rodri Mendoza	1	1	2
7	DF	39	(Spain) Héctor Fort	1	1	2
10	DF	3	(Spain) Adrià Pedrosa	1	0	1
10	MF	5	(Argentina) Federico Redondo	0	1	1
10	MF	8	(Spain) Marc Aguado	1	0	1
10	FW	15	(Spain) Tete Morente	1	0	1
10	DF	18	(Spain) John Donald	1	0	1
10	MF	19	(Democratic Republic of the Congo) Grady Diangana	1	0	1
10	DF	21	(France) Léo Pétrot	0	1	1
10	DF	22	(Austria) David Affengruber	1	0	1
10	FW	24	(Chile) Lucas Cepeda	1	0	1
10	MF	35	(Morocco) Ali Houary	0	1	1
Own goals				2	0	2
Total				41	8	49

=== Clean sheets ===
Rank	No.	Player	La Liga	Copa del Rey	Total
1	1	(Argentina) Matías Dituro	2	2	4
1	13	(Spain) Iñaki Peña	4	0	4
Total			6	2	8

=== Disciplinary record ===
No.	Pos.	Player	La Liga			Copa del Rey			Total		
No.	Pos.	Player	Yellow card	(yellow card) (yellow-red card)	Red card	Yellow card	(yellow card) (yellow-red card)	Red card	Yellow card	(yellow card) (yellow-red card)	Red card
1	GK	(Argentina) Matías Dituro	1	0	0	1	0	0	2	0	0
3	DF	(Spain) Adrià Pedrosa	4	0	0	2	0	0	6	0	0
4	DF	(Senegal) Bambo Diaby	1	0	0	0	0	0	1	0	0
6	DF	(Spain) Pedro Bigas	3	1	0	0	0	0	3	1	0
7	MF	(Spain) Yago Santiago	1	0	0	0	0	0	1	0	0
8	MF	(Spain) Marc Aguado	2	0	0	0	0	0	2	0	0
9	FW	(Portugal) André Silva	2	0	0	0	0	0	2	0	0
10	FW	(Spain) Rafa Mir	4	0	0	0	0	0	4	0	0
11	MF	(Spain) Germán Valera	3	0	0	0	0	0	3	0	0
12	MF	(Spain) Gonzalo Villar	1	0	0	0	0	0	1	0	0
14	MF	(Spain) Aleix Febas	8	0	0	0	0	0	8	0	0
15	DF	(Spain) Álvaro Núñez	2	0	0	0	0	0	2	0	0
15	FW	(Spain) Tete Morente	1	0	0	0	0	0	1	0	0
16	MF	(Portugal) Martim Neto	2	0	0	0	0	0	2	0	0
17	MF	(Spain) Josan	2	0	0	0	0	0	2	0	0
18	DF	(Spain) John Donald	2	0	0	1	0	0	3	0	0
19	MF	(Democratic Republic of the Congo) Grady Diangana	2	0	0	0	0	0	2	0	0
20	FW	(Uruguay) Álvaro Rodríguez	1	0	0	1	0	0	2	0	0
21	DF	(France) Léo Pétrot	2	0	0	0	0	0	2	0	0
22	DF	(Austria) David Affengruber	6	0	1	0	0	0	6	0	1
23	DF	(Spain) Víctor Chust	6	1	0	0	0	0	6	1	0
24	FW	(Chile) Lucas Cepeda	1	0	0	0	0	0	1	0	0
30	MF	(Spain) Rodri Mendoza	4	0	0	0	0	0	4	0	0
35	MF	(Morocco) Ali Houary	0	0	0	1	0	0	1	0	0
42	DF	(Spain) Buba Sangaré	2	0	0	0	0	0	2	0	0
Total			62	2	1	6	0	0	68	2	1
