= 2023–24 Elche CF season =

Elche CF
2023–24 season
- Owner: Christian Bragarnik
- President: Joaquín Buitrago Marhuenda
- Head coach: Sebastián Beccacece
- Stadium: Estadio Martínez Valero
- Segunda División: 11th
- Copa del Rey: Round of 32
- Highest home attendance: 16,154 vs Leganés
- Lowest home attendance: 13,051 vs Racing Santander
- Average home league attendance: 15,695
- Biggest defeat: Burgos 4–0 Elche
Home colours

The 2023–24 season was Elche CF's 101st season in existence and first one back in the Segunda División, the second division of association football in Spain. They also competed in the Copa del Rey.

== Players ==
=== First-team squad ===
As of 1 September 2023

Note: Flags indicate national team as defined under FIFA eligibility rules; some limited exceptions apply. Players may hold more than one non-FIFA nationality.

No.	Pos.	Nation	Player
1	GK	ESP	Miguel San Román
2	DF	ESP	Mario Gaspar
3	DF	ARG	Lautaro Blanco
4	DF	ESP	Diego González
5	DF	ESP	John Nwankwo
6	DF	ESP	Pedro Bigas
7	MF	ESP	Óscar Plano
8	MF	ESP	Raúl Guti
9	FW	ESP	Sergio León
11	MF	ESP	Tete Morente
12	DF	ESP	José Salinas
13	GK	ESP	Edgar Badia

No.	Pos.	Nation	Player
14	MF	ESP	Aleix Febas
15	DF	ESP	Álex Martín
16	MF	ESP	Fidel (captain)
17	MF	ESP	Josan
18	FW	ESP	Borja Garcés (on loan from Atlético Madrid)
19	FW	MAR	Mourad El Ghezouani
20	MF	ESP	Cristian Salvador
21	MF	ARG	Nicolás Castro (on loan from Genk)
22	DF	ARG	Nicolás Fernández Mercau
23	DF	ESP	Carlos Clerc
24	DF	ESP	Sergio Carreira (on loan from Celta)

=== Reserve team ===
Note: Flags indicate national team as defined under FIFA eligibility rules; some limited exceptions apply. Players may hold more than one non-FIFA nationality.

No.	Pos.	Nation	Player
29	FW	ESP	Nordin
30	MF	ESP	Rodrigo Mendoza

No.	Pos.	Nation	Player
34	DF	ESP	Javi Pamíes

=== Out on loan ===
Note: Flags indicate national team as defined under FIFA eligibility rules; some limited exceptions apply. Players may hold more than one non-FIFA nationality.

No.	Pos.	Nation	Player
—	GK	ARG	Axel Werner (at Rosario Central until 30 June 2024)

== Transfers ==
=== In ===
Pos.	Player	Transferred from	Fee	Date	Source
DF	(Spain) Mario Gaspar	(England) Watford	Free	31 July 2023	
FW	(Spain) Borja Garcés	Atlético Madrid	Loan	1 September 2023	
FW	(Spain) Sergio León	Valladolid	Undisclosed	1 September 2023	
FW	(Spain) Manu Nieto	FC Andorra	Loan	7 January 2024	
GK	(Argentina) Matías Dituro	(Turkey) Fatih Karagümrük	Undisclosed	8 January 2024	

=== Out ===
Pos.	Player	Transferred to	Fee	Date	Source
MF	(Spain) Omar Mascarell	(Spain) Mallorca	€800,000	1 July 2023	
FW	(Argentina) Ezequiel Ponce	(Greece) AEK Athens	€3,500,000	5 August 2023	
FW	(Spain) Pere Milla	Espanyol	€2,500,000	15 August 2023	
FW	(Argentina) Lucas Boyé	Granada	€7,000,000	30 August 2023	
FW	(Spain) Sergio León	Eibar	Free	25 January 2024	

== Pre-season and friendlies ==
Win Draw Loss Fixtures

6 August 2023 Friendly	Elche	0–0	Alcorcón	San Pedro del Pinatar
20:00 UTC+2				Stadium: Pinatar Arena Football Center; Attendance: 200; Referee: Campo Salinas

6 August 2023 Festa d'Elx trophy	Elche	1–1 (2–4 p)	Parma	Elche
21:00 UTC+2	Boyé 53'		Man 14'	Stadium: Estadio Martínez Valero; Attendance: 12,204; Referee: Mario Melero Lòpez

== Competitions ==
=== Overall record ===
Competition	First match	Last match	Starting round	Record							
Competition	First match	Last match	Starting round	Pld	W	D	L	GF	GA	GD	Win %
Segunda División	12 August 2023	May 2024	Matchday 1	13	5	4	4	11	14	−3	38.46
Copa del Rey	1 November 2023		First round	1	1	0	0	2	0	+2	100.00
Total				14	6	4	4	13	14	−1	42.86

Last updated: 1 November 2023
Source: Soccerway

=== Segunda División ===
==== League table ====
Pos	Team	Pld	W	D	L	GF	GA	GD	Pts
9	Burgos	42	16	11	15	52	54	−2	59 (Note: Levante finished ahead of Burgos, Racing Ferrol, and Elche on head-to-head points: Levante 12 pts, Burgos 8 pts, Racing Ferrol 8 pts, Elche 4 pts. Burgos finished ahead of Racing Ferrol on head-to-head points: Racing Ferrol 1–1 Burgos, Burgos 2–0 Racing Ferrol)
10	Racing Ferrol	42	15	14	13	49	52	−3	59
11	Elche	42	16	11	15	43	46	−3	59
12	Tenerife	42	15	11	16	38	41	−3	56
13	Albacete	42	12	15	15	50	56	−6	51 (Note: Albacete finished ahead of Cartagena and Zaragoza on head-to-head points: Albacete 6 pts, Cartagena 5 pts, Zaragoza 4 pts)

Updated to match(es) played on 2 Jun 2024. Source: LaLiga HyperMotion
Rules for classification: 1) Points; 2) Head-to-head points; 3) Head-to-head goal difference; 4) Goal difference; 5) Goals scored; 6) Fair-play points
(Note: Head-to-head record is used only after all the matches between the teams in question have been played)

==== Results summary ====
Overall								Home						Away					
Pld	W	D	L	GF	GA	GD	Pts	W	D	L	GF	GA	GD	W	D	L	GF	GA	GD
42	16	11	15	43	46	−3	59	10	6	5	25	18	+7	6	5	10	18	28	−10

Source: LALIGA HYPERMOTION

==== Results by round ====
Round	1	2	3	4	5	6	7	8	9	10	11	12	13	14	15	16	17	18	19	20	21	22	23	24	25	26	27	28	29	30	31	32	33	34	35	36	37
Ground	H	A	H	H	A	H	A	H	A	H	A	A	H	A	H	A	H	A	H	A	H	A	H	A	H	A	H	A	H	A	H	A	A	H	A	H	H
Result	L	L	W	D	D	W	L	D	L	W	D	W	W	D	W	L	W	W	L	L	D	W	D	W	W	L	D	W	W	W	W	L	L	L	D	W	
Position	15	21	15	15	14	11	17	16	17	14	16	12	11	11	9	10	8	7	9	12	12	10	9	8	6	7	8	5	4	2	2	3	5	7	8	5	

Updated to match(es) played on 20 April 2024. Source: LALIGA HYPERMOTION
A = Away; H = Home; W = Win; D = Draw; L = Loss

==== Matches ====
The league fixtures were unveiled on 28 June 2023.

12 August 2023 1	Elche	0–1	Racing Ferrol	Elche
22:00 CEST (UTC+2)		Report	Bernal (yellow card) 39'; Vicente (yellow card) 44'; Losada 51'	Stadium: Estadio Martínez Valero; Attendance: 14,506; Referee: Germán Cid Camacho

19 August 2023 2	Eibar	2–1	Elche	Eibar
17:00 CEST (UTC+2)	Aketxe 5'; Soriano 77'; Bautista (yellow card) 83'	Report	Bigas (yellow card) 50'; Boyé 66' (pen.), (yellow card) 68'	Stadium: Ipurua Municipal Stadium; Attendance: 2,938; Referee: Óliver de la Fuente Ramos

26 August 2023 3	Elche	1–0	Villarreal B	Elche
21:30 CEST (UTC+2)	Chaves 9' (pen.); Josan (yellow card) 84'; Clerc (yellow card) 90+2'	Report		Stadium: Estadio Martínez Valero; Attendance: 13,318; Referee: Rafael Sánchez López

2 September 2023 4	Elche	1–1	Racing Santander	Elche
21:00 CEST (UTC+2)	Castro 30'	Report	Arana 53'	Stadium: Estadio Martínez Valero; Attendance: 13,051; Referee: Álvaro Moreno Aragón

10 September 2023 5	Valladolid	1–1	Elche	Valladolid
21:00 CEST (UTC+2)	Gustavo Henrique 53'	Report	León 53'	Stadium: Estadio José Zorrilla; Attendance: 16,768; Referee: Alejandro Quintero González

17 September 2023 6	Elche	1–0	Leganés	Elche
18:30 CEST (UTC+2)	León 33'	Report		Stadium: Estadio Martínez Valero; Attendance: 16,154; Referee: José Antonio López Toca

23 September 2023 7	Burgos	4–0	Elche	Burgos
18:30 CEST (UTC+2)	Caro (yellow card) 16'; Espiau (yellow card) 23'; Sánchez 38' (pen.), 45+3'; Ojeda 66'; Appin (yellow card) 81'; Bermejo 88'	Report	Fernández (yellow card) 45+2'	Stadium: El Plantío; Attendance: 8,753; Referee: Adrián Cordero Vega

30 September 2023 8	Elche	0–0	Levante	Elche
18:30 CEST (UTC+2)	Pedro Bigas (yellow card) 66'	Report	Oriol Rey (yellow card) 90+3'	Stadium: Estadio Martínez Valero; Attendance: 15,660; Referee: (Spain) Raúl González Francés

4 October 2023 9	Sporting Gijón	2–0	Elche	Gijón
21:30 CEST (UTC+2)	Gaspar Campos 31'; Pașcanu 41'	Report		Stadium: El Molinón; Attendance: 14,916; Referee: (Spain) Daniel Trujillo Suárez

9 October 2023 10	Elche	2–1	FC Andorra	Elche
19:00 CEST (UTC+2)	Óscar Plano 23'; Borja Garcés 89'	Report	Scheidler 64'	Stadium: Estadio Martínez Valero; Attendance: 15,073; Referee: (Spain) Jon González Esteban

15 October 2023 11	Eldense	1–1	Elche	Elda
16:15 CEST (UTC+2)	Andone 35'; Sergio Ortuño (yellow card) 56'; Jesús Clemente (yellow card) 61'; Pedro Capó (yellow card) 87'; Álex Bernal (yellow card) 90+4'	Report	Borja Garcés (yellow card) 51'; David Timor 59' (o.g.); Mario Gaspar (yellow card) 62'; Carlos Clerc (yellow card) 90+1'	Stadium: Nuevo Pepico Amat; Attendance: 4,906; Referee: (Spain) Dámaso Arcediano Monescillo

22 October 2023 12	Huesca	0–1	Elche	Huesca
16:15 CEST (UTC+2)	Hashimoto (yellow card) 67'; Rubén Pulido (yellow card) 73'; Óscar Sielva (yellow card) 90+8'	Report	Nicolás Fernández 5'; Blanco (yellow card) 21'; Castro (yellow card) 68'; Pedro Bigas (yellow card) 90+4'	Stadium: Estadio El Alcoraz; Attendance: 5,363; Referee: (Spain) Iosu Galech Apezteguía

28 October 2023 13	Elche	2–1	Tenerife	Elche
21:00 CEST (UTC+2)	Óscar Plano 55'; Castro 68' (pen.)	Report	José María Amo (yellow card) 14'; Loïc Williams (yellow card) 25'; Waldo Rubio (yellow card) 34'; Mellot 52'; Enric Gallego (yellow card) 71'; Jesús Belza (yellow card) 76'; Dauda (yellow card) 90+6'	Stadium: Estadio Martínez Valero; Attendance: 13,745; Referee: (Spain) Rubén Ávalos Barrera

4 November 2023 14	Albacete	1–1	Elche	Albacete
21:00 CET (UTC+1)	Riki (yellow card) 37'; Lander Olaetxea (yellow card) 61'; Dani Escriche 76'; Agus Medina (yellow card) 90+1'	Report	Castro (yellow card) 28' (yellow-red card) 57'; Óscar Plano 49'; Mario Gaspar (yellow card) 67'; Fernández (yellow card) 73'; Fidel (yellow card) 88'; Raúl Guti (yellow card) 90+7'	Stadium: Estadio Carlos Belmonte; Attendance: 10,203; Referee: (Spain) Miguel Sesma Espinosa

11 November 2023 15	Elche	2–0	Real Zaragoza	Elche
18:30 CET (UTC+1)	Fernández (yellow card) 55'; Tete Morente 61' (yellow card) 67'; Óscar Plano 64'; Mourad (yellow card) 74'; Blanco (yellow card) 86'	Report	Lecoeuche (yellow card) 23'; Manu Vallejo (yellow card) 76'	Stadium: Estadio Martínez Valero; Attendance: 15,681; Referee: (Spain) Adrián Cordero Vega

18 November 2023 16	Espanyol	2–0	Elche	Barcelona
21:00 CET (UTC+1)	Fernando Calero (yellow card) 3'; Braithwaite 14' 22'; Cabrera (yellow card) 35'; José Gragera (yellow card) 63'	Report	Josan (yellow card) 63'; Carlos Clerc (yellow card) 72'	Stadium: Stage Front Stadium; Attendance: 19,617; Referee: (Spain) Álvaro Moreno Aragón

26 November 2023 17	Elche	2–0	Amorebieta	Elche
16:15 CET (UTC+1)	Fernández (yellow card) 68'; Fidel (yellow card) 72'; Mario Gaspar 84'; Tete Morente 90+2'	Report	Manu Hernando (yellow card) 41'; Josep Gayá (yellow card) 78'	Stadium: Estadio Martínez Valero; Attendance: 14,042; Referee: (Spain) Dámaso Arcediano Monescillo

3 December 2023 18	Alcorcón	0–2	Elche	Alcorcón
16:15 CET (UTC+1)	Pedro Mosquera (yellow card) 44'; Óscar Rivas (yellow card) 73'; Javi Pérez (yellow card) 77'; Xavi Quintillà (red card) 77'	Report	Tete Morente 17'; Mario Gaspar (yellow card) 21'; Óscar Plano 52' (pen.)	Stadium: Estadio Municipal de Santo Domingo; Attendance: 3,545; Referee: (Spain) Oliver De la Fuente Ramos

10 December 2023 19	Elche	1–2	FC Cartagena	Elche
14:00 CET (UTC+1)	Óscar Plano 18'; Tete Morente (yellow card) 25'; Borja Garcés (yellow card) 89'; Pedro Bigas (yellow card) 90+9'	Report	Alfredo Ortuño 66' (yellow card) 90+4'; Jansson (yellow card) 71'; Gonzalo Verdú (yellow card) 78'; Luis Muñoz 84'; José Fontán (yellow card) 88'	Stadium: Estadio Martínez Valero; Attendance: 15,452; Referee: (Spain) Luis Milla Alvendiz

15 December 2023 20	Real Oviedo	3–2	Elche	Oviedo
20:30 CET (UTC+1)	Masca 31'; Borja Bastón 68'; Colombatto (yellow card) 73'; Jimmy Suárez (yellow card) 74'; Sebas Moyano 89'	Report	Óscar Plano 4'; Fernández 40' (yellow card) 90+2'; Rodri Mendoza (yellow card) 59'; Aleix Febas (yellow card) 60'; Sergio Carreira (yellow card) 69'	Stadium: Estadio Carlos Tartiere; Attendance: 12,252; Referee: (Spain) Salvador Lax Franco

19 December 2023 21	Elche	0–0	Mirandés	Elche
21:30 CET (UTC+1)	Aleix Febas (yellow card) 34'; Borja Garcés (yellow card) 82'	Report	Tachi (yellow card) 35'; Carlos Martín (yellow card) 45'; Alberto Reina (yellow card) 52'	Stadium: Estadio Martínez Valero; Attendance: 9,792; Referee: (Spain) Iosu Galech Apezteguía

13 January 2024 22	Tenerife	0–1	Elche	Santa Cruz de Tenerife
18:30 CET (UTC+1)	Bodiger (yellow card) 21'; Aitor Sanz (yellow card) 26'; José María Amo (yellow card) 77'; Álvaro Jiménez (yellow card) 83'	Report	Rodri Mendoza 3'; John Nwankwo (yellow card) 54'; Fernández (yellow card) 72'	Stadium: Estadio Heliodoro Rodríguez López; Attendance: 17,177; Referee: (Spain) Jon González Esteban

21 January 2024 23	Elche	0–0	Real Valladolid	Elche
21:00 CET (UTC+1)	Rodri Mendoza (yellow card) 26'; John Nwankwo (yellow card) 52'	Report	Sergio Escudero (yellow card) 63'; César de la Hoz (yellow card) 76'	Stadium: Estadio Martínez Valero; Attendance: 12,334; Referee: (Spain) Salvador Lax Franco

28 January 2024 24	FC Andorra	0–1	Elche	Andorra la Vella
16:15 CET (UTC+1)	Iker Benito (yellow card) 29'; Iván Gil (yellow card) 31'; Álex Petxarroman (yellow card) 35'	Report	Mario Gaspar (yellow card) 22'; Carlos Clerc (yellow card) 36'; Tete Morente (yellow card) 78'; Castro 81'	Stadium: Estadi Nacional; Attendance: 2,398; Referee: (Spain) Oliver De la Fuente Ramos

2 February 2024 25	Elche	2–0	Burgos	Elche
20:30 CET (UTC+1)	Fernández (yellow card) 18'; Pedro Bigas 59'; Aleix Febas (yellow card) 86'; Mourad 90+9' (pen.)	Report		Stadium: Estadio Martínez Valero; Attendance: 14,942; Referee: (Spain) Rafael Sánchez López

10 February 2024 26	Amorebieta	1–0	Elche	Lezama
16:15 CET (UTC+1)	Josué Dorrio 56'	Report		Stadium: Lezama Facilities; Attendance: 747; Referee: (Spain) Miguel González Díaz

18 February 2024 27	Elche	0–0	Eibar	Elche
21:00 CET (UTC+1)	Carlos Clerc (yellow card) 6'; Aleix Febas (yellow card) 16'; Fernández (yellow card) 21'; John Nwankwo (yellow card) 38'	Report	Matheus Pereira (yellow card) 61'; Peru Nolaskoain (yellow card) 64'; Anaitz Arbilla (yellow card) 74'; Zidane (yellow card) 86'	Stadium: Estadio Martínez Valero; Attendance: 13,643; Referee: (Spain) José Luis Guzmán Mansilla

25 February 2024 28	FC Cartagena	0–1	Elche	Cartagena
18:30 CET (UTC+1)	Iván Calero (yellow card) 75'; Gonzalo Verdú (yellow card) 90+4'	Report	Castro 57'	Stadium: Estadio Cartagonova; Referee: (Spain) Daniel Trujillo Suárez

4 March 2024 29	Elche	3–0	Alcorcón	Elche
20:30 CET (UTC+1)	Mourad 10'; Tete Morente 27' (pen.); Fernández 37'; Castro (yellow card) 54'	Report	Juanma Bravo (yellow card) 18'; Víctor García (yellow card) 45'; Babin (yellow card) 90+1'	Stadium: Estadio Martínez Valero; Attendance: 14,387; Referee: (Spain) Adrián Cordero Vega

10 March 2024 30	Villarreal B	0–1	Elche	Villarreal
16:15 CET (UTC+1)	Dani Requena (yellow card) 61'; Antonio Espigares (yellow card) 65'	Report	Josan (yellow card) 13'; Castro 15'; Arnau Puigmal (yellow card) 45'; Diego González (yellow card) 62'; Fernández (yellow card) 77'; Borja Garcés (yellow card) 86'	Stadium: Estadio de la Cerámica; Attendance: 3,715; Referee: (Spain) Rubén Ávalos Barrera

=== Copa del Rey ===
1 November 2023 First round	CE Europa	0–2	Elche	Barcelona
18:00 CET (UTC+1)		Report	Mourad 43'; Mendoza 82'	Stadium: Nou Sardenya; Referee: Salvador Lax Franco

7 December 2023 Second round	Linares Deportivo	1–3	Elche	Linares
20:00 CET (UTC+1)	Samuel Corral 61'; Tano Bonnín (yellow card) 90+5'	Report	Borja Garcés 58'; Aleix Febas 83'; Diego González (yellow card) 86'; Sergio León 89'	Stadium: Estadio de Linarejos; Referee: (Spain) Germán Cid Camacho

6 January 2024 Round of 32	Elche	0–2	Girona	Elche
18:00 CET (UTC+1)	Pedro Bigas (yellow card) 24'; Tete Morente (yellow card) 90+1'	Report	Blind 37'; Yan Couto 67'	Stadium: Estadio Martínez Valero; Attendance: 15,518; Referee: (Spain) Javier Alberola Rojas
