= Rodri Mendoza =

Spanish footballer

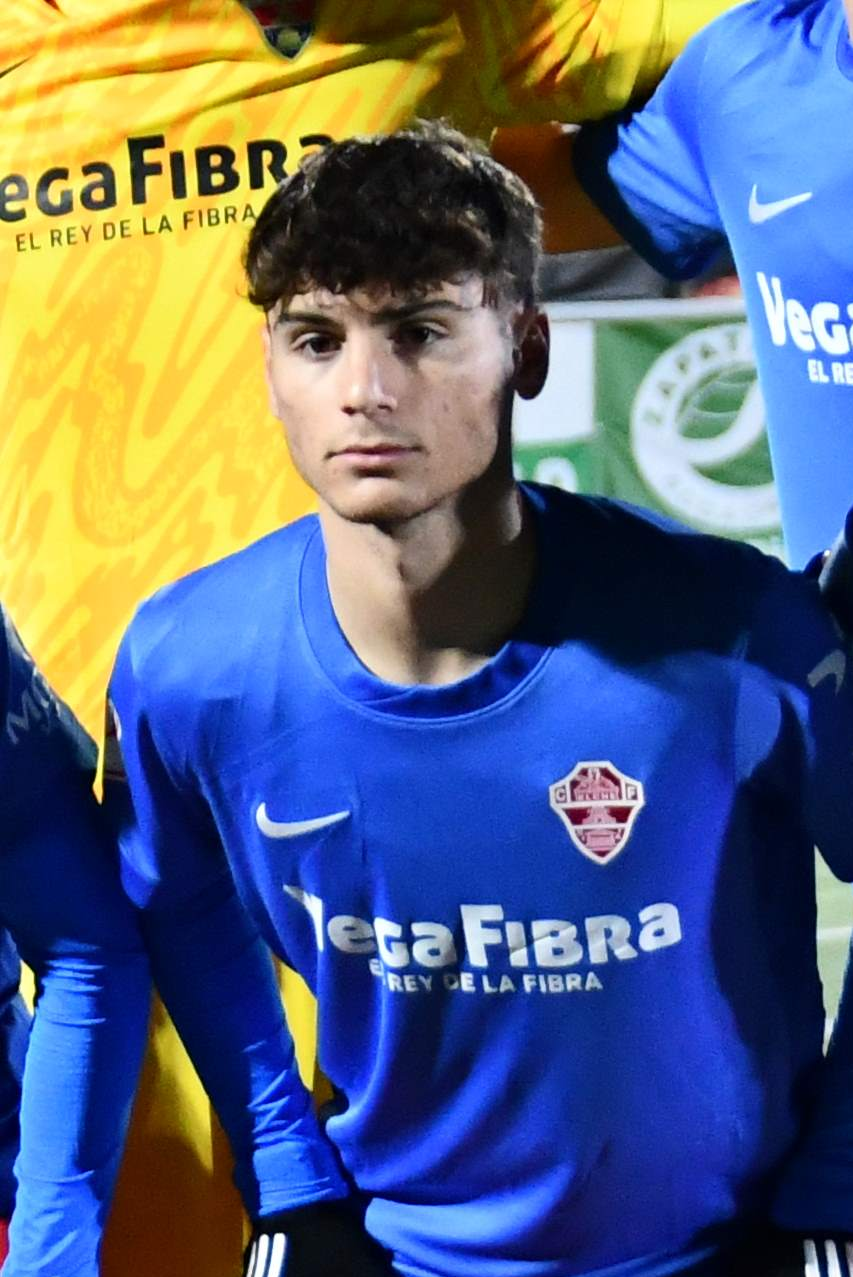
- Mendoza with Elche in 2025

Personal information
- Full name: Rodrigo Mendoza Martínez-Moyá
- Date of birth: 15 March 2005 (age 21)
- Place of birth: Molina de Segura, Spain
- Height: 1.82 m (6 ft 0 in)
- Position: Midfielder

Team information
- Current team: Atlético Madrid
- Number: 4

Youth career
- Altorreal
- San Miguel
- 2017–2019: Ranero
- 2019–2022: Elche

Senior career*
Years	Team	Apps	(Gls)
2021–2024	Elche B	22	(1)
2022–2026	Elche	60	(3)
2026–	Atlético Madrid	11	(0)

International career^{‡}
2022	Spain U17	6	(1)
2022	Spain U18	2	(1)
2024	Spain U19	3	(0)
2025	Spain U20	6	(0)
2025–	Spain U21	4	(0)
- * Club domestic league appearances and goals as of 23:11, 29 August 2026 (UTC) ‡ National team caps and goals as of 19:15, 18 November 2025 (UTC)

Rodrigo Mendoza Martínez-Moyá (born 15 March 2005), sometimes known as Rodri, is a Spanish professional footballer who plays as a midfielder for La Liga club Atlético Madrid.

== Club career ==
=== Elche ===
Born in Molina de Segura, Region of Murcia, Mendoza represented EF Altorreal, EF San Miguel and Ranero CF as a youth before joining Elche CF's youth categories in 2019. He made his senior debut with the latter's reserves on 16 October 2021, coming on as a second-half substitute in a 4–0 Tercera División RFEF away routing of UD Benigànim.

Mendoza made his first team debut on 12 November 2022, replacing Josan in a 3–0 away win over CD L'Alcora, for the season's Copa del Rey. Twelve days later, he renewed his contract with the club until 2026.

Mendoza featured in the first team pre-season in 2023, being promoted to the main squad by manager Sebastián Beccacece. He made his professional debut on 30 September of that year, replacing Fidel in a 0–0 Segunda División home draw against Levante UD.

=== Atlético Madrid ===
On 2 February 2026, Mendoza joined fellow La Liga club Atlético Madrid, signing a contract with the club until 2031.

== International career ==
Mendoza is a Spain youth international, having represented the country at under-17 level. He was part of the under-18 squad that won the Four Nations Tournament, and later appeared for the under-19 team in two friendly matches against Norway.

In August 2025, Mendoza received his first call-up to the Spain U21 for the 2027 UEFA European Under-21 Championship qualification matches. He made his debut against Cyprus, starting the match and played 78 minutes.

Mendoza was also included in the Spain U20 squad for the 2025 FIFA U-20 World Cup in Chile. He was a regular player throughout the tournament, before Spain were eliminated by Colombia in the quarter-finals.

== Career statistics ==
=== Club ===
As of match played 29 August 2026

Appearances and goals by club, season and competition
Club	Season	League			Copa del Rey		Europe		Other		Total	
Club	Season	Division	Apps	Goals	Apps	Goals	Apps	Goals	Apps	Goals	Apps	Goals
Elche B	2021–22	Tercera División RFEF	10	0	—		—		—		10	0
Elche B	2022–23	Tercera Federación	9	0	—		—		—		9	0
Elche B	2023–24	Tercera Federación	3	1	—		—		—		3	1
Elche B	Total		22	1	—		—		—		22	1
Elche	2022–23	La Liga	0	0	1	0	—		—		1	0
Elche	2023–24	Segunda División	23	1	3	1	—		—		26	2
Elche	2024–25	Segunda División	21	1	3	1	—		—		24	2
Elche	2025–26	La Liga	16	1	4	1	—		—		20	2
Elche	Total		60	3	11	3	—		—		71	6
Atlético Madrid	2025–26	La Liga	8	0	1	0	1 (Note: Appearance in UEFA Champions League)	0	—		10	0
Atlético Madrid	2026–27	La Liga	3	0	0	0	0	0	0	0	3	0
Atlético Madrid	Total		11	0	1	0	1	0	0	0	13	0
Career total			93	4	12	3	1	0	0	0	106	7

== Honours ==
Atlético Madrid

- Copa del Rey runner-up: 2025–26
