= Álvaro Núñez (footballer, born 2000) =

Spanish footballer

Personal information
- Full name: Álvaro Núñez Cobo
- Date of birth: 7 July 2000 (age 26)
- Place of birth: Bilbao, Spain
- Height: 1.77 m (5 ft 10 in)
- Position: Right back

Team information
- Current team: Celta
- Number: 15

Youth career
- Sondika
- 2010–2018: Athletic Bilbao

Senior career*
Years	Team	Apps	(Gls)
2018–2020	Basconia	53	(3)
2020–2022	Bilbao Athletic	61	(1)
2022–2023	Barcelona B	37	(1)
2023–2024	Amorebieta	39	(2)
2024–2026	Elche	56	(2)
2026–	Celta	6	(0)

International career^{‡}
2025–	Basque Country	1	(0)
- * Club domestic league appearances and goals as of 27 May 2026 ‡ National team caps and goals as of 15 November 2025

Álvaro Núñez Cobo (born 7 July 2000) is a Spanish professional footballer who plays as a right back for club RC Celta de Vigo.

== Club career ==
=== Athletic Bilbao ===
Núñez was born in Bilbao, Biscay, Basque Country, and joined Athletic Bilbao's Lezama in 2010, from CD Sondika. On 19 June 2018, after finishing his formation, he was promoted to farm team CD Basconia in Tercera División.

Núñez made his senior debut on 26 August 2018, starting in a 2–2 home draw against SD Deusto. He immediately became a regular starter for Basconia, and being promoted to the reserves in May 2019 but only making his first appearance for them on 26 January 2020, coming on as a late substitute for Jesús Areso in a 1–0 Segunda División B home win over Cultural y Deportiva Leonesa.

On 8 June 2022, Núñez left the Lions.

=== Barcelona ===
On 6 July 2022, Núñez signed a one-year deal with FC Barcelona, being assigned to the B-team in Primera Federación. Despite being a first-choice during the season, he rejected a contract renewal in June 2023.

=== Amorebieta ===
On 14 July 2023, Núñez agreed to a deal with Segunda División side SD Amorebieta. He made his professional debut on 21 August, coming on as a second-half substitute for Jorge Mier in a 2–2 away draw against Albacete Balompié, and scored his first professional goal on 3 September, but in a 3–2 away loss to RCD Espanyol.

=== Elche ===
On 27 June 2024, after Amore's relegation, Núñez signed a two-year contract with Elche CF also in the second division. He was a first-choice during the campaign, scoring twice in 37 matches as the club achieved promotion to La Liga.

Núñez made his debut in the top tier of Spanish football on 18 August 2025, starting in a 1–1 home draw against Real Betis.

=== Celta ===
On 2 February 2026, Núñez moved to fellow first division side RC Celta de Vigo on a four-and-a-half-year contract.

== Personal life ==
His father Carlos was also a footballer in the late 1980s and early 1990s, playing mainly in the third tier for the likes of Bilbao Athletic and SD Lemona.

== Career statistics ==
As of match played 3 May 2026

Appearances and goals by club, season and competition
Club	Season	League			Cup		Europe		Other		Total	
Club	Season	Division	Apps	Goals	Apps	Goals	Apps	Goals	Apps	Goals	Apps	Goals
Basconia	2018–19	Tercera División	37	2	—		—		—		37	2
Basconia	2019–20	Tercera División	16	1	—		—		1 (Note: Appearances in 2020 Tercera División play-offs)	0	17	1
Basconia	Total		53	3	—		—		1	0	54	3
Bilbao Athletic	2020–21	Segunda División B	20	0	—		—		3 (Note: Appearances in Segunda División B play-offs)	0	23	0
Bilbao Athletic	2021–22	Primera División RFEF	35	1	—		—		2 (Note: Appearances in 2022 Primera División RFEF play-offs)	0	37	1
Bilbao Athletic	Total		55	1	—		—		5	0	60	1
Barcelona B	2022–23	Primera Federación	37	1	—		—		2 (Note: Appearances in 2023 Primera Federación play-offs)	0	39	1
Amorebieta	2023–24	Segunda División	39	2	1	0	—		—		40	2
Elche	2024–25	Segunda División	37	2	3	0	—		—		40	2
Elche	2025–26	La Liga	19	0	0	0	—		—		19	0
Elche	Total		56	2	3	0	—		—		59	2
Celta	2025–26	La Liga	6	0	—		0	0	—		6	0
Career total			246	9	4	0	0	0	8	0	258	9
