= Álex Sánchez (footballer, born 2006) =

Spanish footballer

Personal information
- Full name: Alejandro Sánchez Mantecón
- Date of birth: 5 March 2006 (age 20)
- Place of birth: Madrid, Spain
- Position: Winger

Team information
- Current team: Elche B
- Number: 21

Youth career
- 2013–2019: Rayo Vallecano
- 2019–2024: Real Madrid

Senior career*
Years	Team	Apps	(Gls)
2024–2026	Real Madrid C	11	(0)
2026–	Elche B	1	(0)
2026–	Elche	1	(0)
- * Club domestic league appearances and goals as of 25 January 2026

Alejandro "Álex" Sánchez Mantecón (born 5 March 2006) is a Spanish professional footballer who plays mainly as a right winger for Elche CF Ilicitano.

== Career ==
Born in Madrid, Sánchez joined Real Madrid's La Fábrica in 2019, from Rayo Vallecano. Promoted to the C-team in Segunda Federación in July 2024, he made his senior debut with on 19 October of that year, coming on as a late substitute for Bruno Iglesias in a 2–0 away loss to CD Guadalajara.

Rarely used for the C's, Sánchez left Real Madrid and immediately joined Elche CF on 17 January 2026, being initially a member of the B-team also in the fourth division; his former side also kept 50% of his economic rights. Upon arriving, he immediately began training with the first team under manager Eder Sarabia, and made his professional – and La Liga – debut on 23 January, replacing Marc Aguado late into a 3–2 away loss to Levante UD.

== Personal life ==
Sánchez's father Míchel was also a footballer who played as a midfielder. His older brother, also named Miguel Ángel, plays as a right-back.
