= David Affengruber (footballer, born 2001) =

Austrian footballer

- Affengruber in 2026

Personal information
- Full name: David Leopold Affengruber
- Date of birth: 19 March 2001 (age 25)
- Place of birth: Scheibbs, Austria
- Height: 1.85 m (6 ft 1 in)
- Position: Centre-back

Team information
- Current team: Fulham
- Number: 22

Youth career
- 2007–2013: SC Wieselburg
- 2013–2019: Red Bull Salzburg

Senior career*
Years	Team	Apps	(Gls)
2019–2021	FC Liefering	51	(5)
2021	Red Bull Salzburg	5	(0)
2021–2024	Sturm Graz	85	(7)
2024–2026	Elche	79	(1)
2026–	Fulham	6	(0)

International career^{‡}
2019–2020	Austria U19	8	(0)
2021–2022	Austria U21	6	(0)
2026–	Austria	5	(1)
- * Club domestic league appearances and goals as of 31 October 2026 ‡ National team caps and goals as of 17 November 2026

David Leopold Affengruber (born 19 March 2001) is an Austrian professional footballer who plays as a centre-back for Premier League club Fulham and the Austria national team.

== Club career ==
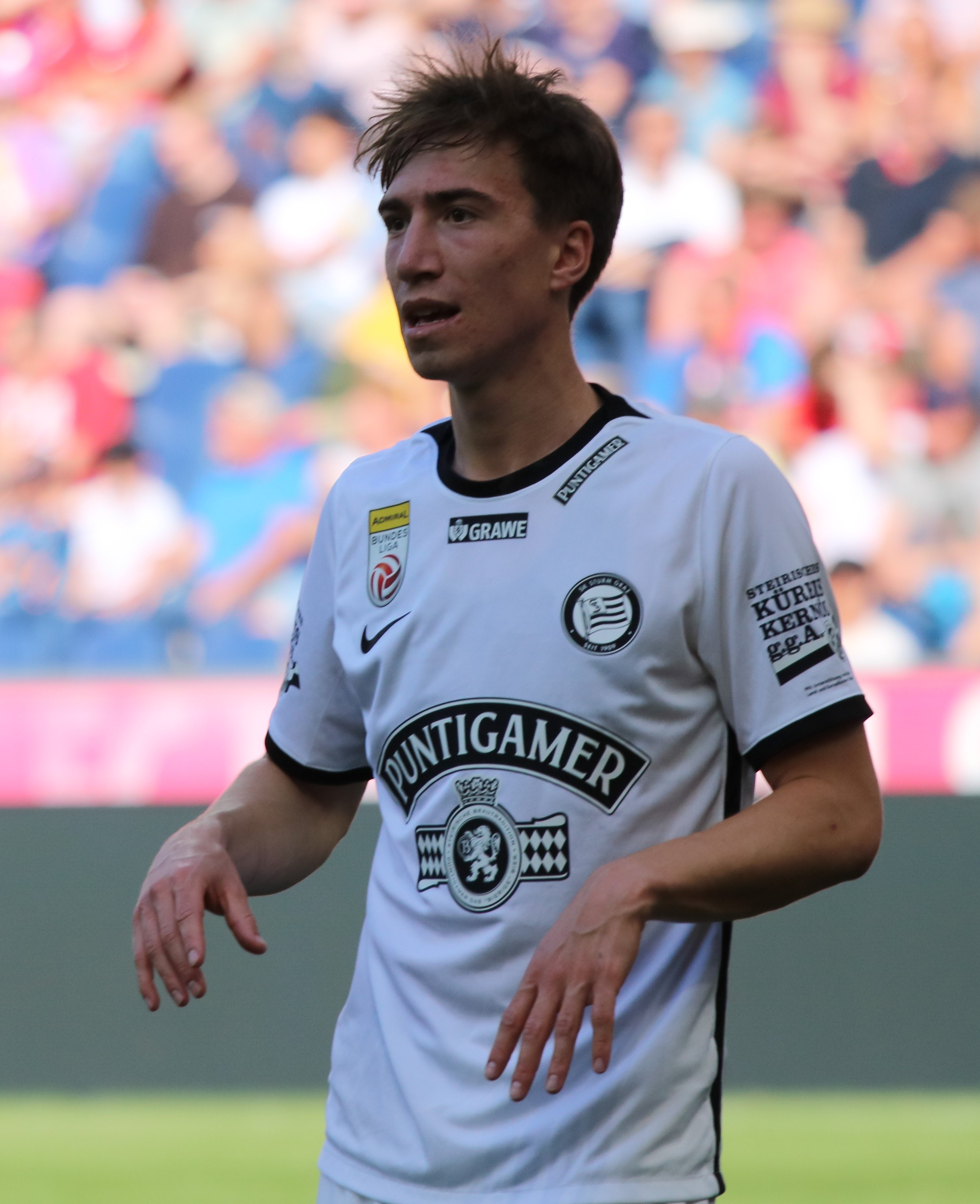
Affengruber in 2023

Affengruber began his career at SC Wieselburg. In September 2013 he moved to the youth team of Red Bull Salzburg. From the 2015–16 season he played in all age groups in the academy at Red Bull Salzburg.

For the 2019–20 season he was promoted to FC Liefering. He made his debut for Liefering in the second division in July 2019. He started against SKU Amstetten on matchday one of that season. In the game he also scored his first second division goal.

In January 2021 he made his Bundesliga debut for Red Bull Salzburg against TSV Hartberg. In February 2021, he received a contract in Salzburg that ran until May 2022. By the end of the season he had made five appearances for Salzburg in the Bundesliga.

On 11 June 2021, Affengruber signed a three-year contract with Sturm Graz. On 28 August 2024, he moved abroad for the first time in his career, to join Elche of Spain's Segunda División.

On 1 September 2026, Affengruber was announced at Premier League side Fulham on a four-year deal, for an undisclosed fee. He made his debut for the club, starting the whole game, in a goalless draw against Liverpool on 12 September 2026. For his debut performance, Affengruber was named Man of the Match by Fulham's supporters for playing "alongside Calvin Bassey at the centre of defence, limiting the in-form Alexander Isak to just a couple of chances".

== International career ==
Affengruber made his debut for the Austrian U-19 team against Latvia in September 2019. He made his U-21 debut against Norway in September 2021.

On 18 May 2026, Affengruber was selected in Ralf Rangnick’s 26-man squad for the 2026 FIFA World Cup, marking Austria’s first appearance in the tournament since 1998.

== Career statistics ==
=== Club ===
As of match played 31 October 2026

Appearances and goals by club, season and competition
Club	Season	League			National cup (Note: Includes Austrian Cup, Copa del Rey, FA Cup)		League cup (Note: Includes EFL Cup)		Europe		Total	
Club	Season	Division	Apps	Goals	Apps	Goals	Apps	Goals	Apps	Goals	Apps	Goals
FC Liefering	2019–20	2. Liga	28	2	—		—		—		28	2
FC Liefering	2020–21	2. Liga	23	3	—		—		—		23	3
FC Liefering	Total		51	5	—		—		—		51	5
Red Bull Salzburg	2020–21	Austrian Bundesliga	5	0	1	0	—		0	0	6	0
Sturm Graz	2021–22	Austrian Bundesliga	30	1	3	1	—		8 (Note: Appearances in UEFA Europa League)	0	41	2
Sturm Graz	2022–23	Austrian Bundesliga	27	4	5	1	—		8 (Note: Two appearances in UEFA Champions League, six appearances in UEFA Europa League)	0	40	5
Sturm Graz	2023–24	Austrian Bundesliga	28	2	4	1	—		12 (Note: Two appearances in UEFA Champions League, six appearances in UEFA Europa League, four appearances in UEFA Europa Conference League)	0	44	3
Sturm Graz	Total		85	7	12	3	—		28	0	125	10
Elche	2024–25	Segunda División	40	0	2	1	—		—		42	1
Elche	2025–26	La Liga	36	1	3	0	—		—		39	1
Elche	2026–27	La Liga	3	0	—		—		—		3	0
Elche	Total		79	1	5	1	—		—		84	2
Fulham	2026–27	Premier League	6	0	0	0	0	0	—		6	0
Career total			227	13	21	4	0	0	28	0	273	17

=== International ===
As of match played 17 November 2026

Appearances and goals by national team and year
National team	Year	Apps	Goals
Austria	2026	5	1
Total		5	1

Scores and results list Austria's goal tally first, score column indicates score after each Affengruber goal.

List of international goals scored by David Affengruber
No.	Date	Venue	Cap	Opponent	Score	Result	Competition
1	27 September 2026	Ernst-Happel-Stadion, Vienna, Austria	2	Kosovo	1–0	3–1	2026–27 UEFA Nations League B

== Honours ==
Red Bull Salzburg Youth

- Jugendliga U18: 2019

FC Liefering

- Austrian Football First League runner-up: 2021

Red Bull Salzburg

- Austrian Bundesliga: 2021
- Austrian Cup: 2021
