= Adam Boayar =

Spanish footballer

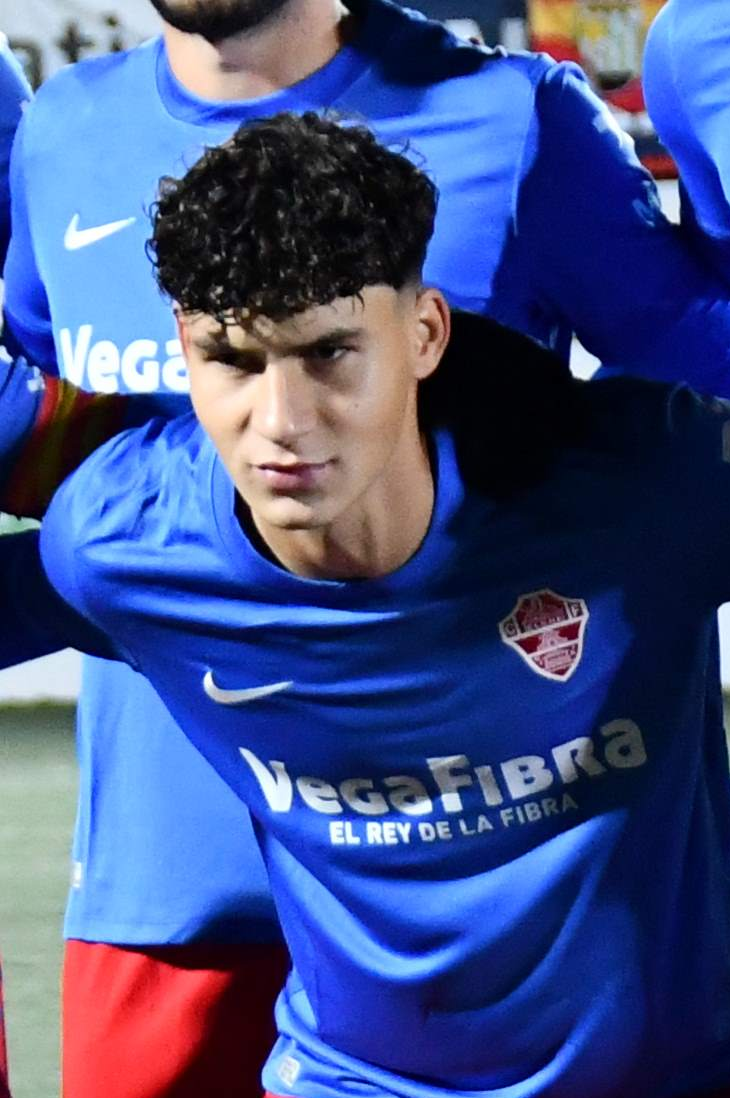

Personal information
- Full name: Adam Boayar Benaisa
- Date of birth: 13 October 2005 (age 21)
- Place of birth: Melilla, Spain
- Height: 1.80 m (5 ft 11 in)
- Position: Attacking midfielder

Team information
- Current team: Elche B
- Number: 23

Youth career
- Rusadir
- 2021–2023: Elche

Senior career*
Years	Team	Apps	(Gls)
2023–	Elche B	37	(10)
2023–	Elche	18	(3)

International career^{‡}
2024–	Morocco U20	6	(1)
- * Club domestic league appearances and goals as of 16 May 2026 ‡ National team caps and goals as of 14 October 2024

Adam Boayar Benaisa (Arabic: آدم بوعيار بنعيسى; born 13 October 2005), also known as Adam El Mokhtari or just Adam, is a professional footballer who plays as an attacking midfielder for La Liga club Elche. Born in Spain, he represents Morocco at youth level.

== Career ==
Adam joined Elche CF's youth setup in January 2021, from hometown side CF Rusadir. Ahead of the 2023–24 season, he was promoted to the reserves in Tercera Federación, and made his senior debut on 10 September 2023 by starting in a 2–0 away win over CF Gandía.

On 29 September 2023, Adam renewed his contract with the Franjiverdes. He scored his first senior goals the following day, netting a brace for the B's in a 6–0 home routing of UD Castellonense.

Adam made his first team debut with Elche on 1 November 2023, starting in a 2–0 away win over CE Europa, for the campaign's Copa del Rey. He made his professional debut three days later, coming on as a late substitute for Mourad in a 1–1 Segunda División away draw against Albacete Balompié.

== Personal life ==
Boayar was born in Melilla, Spain to parents of Moroccan descent.
