= Yago Santiago =

Spanish association football player

Personal information
- Full name: Yago de Santiago Alonso
- Date of birth: 15 April 2003 (age 23)
- Place of birth: Vigo, Spain
- Height: 1.80 m (5 ft 11 in)
- Position: Winger

Team information
- Current team: Elche
- Number: 7

Youth career
- Areosa
- 2016–2019: Celta
- 2019–2024: Tottenham Hotspur

Senior career*
Years	Team	Apps	(Gls)
2023–2024	Tottenham Hotspur	0	(0)
2024–	Elche	27	(2)
- * Club domestic league appearances and goals as of 26 May 2026

Yago de Santiago Alonso (born 15 April 2003) is a Spanish footballer who plays as a winger for La Liga club Elche CF.

== Early life ==
From Vigo, Santiago attended school at El Colegio San José de Cluny. He began playing at a football academy camp at CD Areosa as a five year-old with his father Gonzalo. He stayed with Areosa for a number of years in his childhood before joining RC Celta de Vigo.

== Career ==
=== Tottenham Hotspur ===
As part of Celta's academy, Santiago scored 15 goals for their U16 side during the 2018-19 season. That Spring, he visited the academy at Tottenham Hotspur and signed for the club in the summer of 2019.

During the 2022–23 season, Santiago was called up to first team Spurs training by manager Antonio Conte after impressing for the under-21 side. In April 2023, he signed a new two-year contract with Spurs.

Santiago was included in the Spurs first team match-day squad for a Premier League clash against Brighton & Hove Albion on 28 December 2023, but remained an unused substitute

=== Elche ===
On 30 July 2024, Santiago returned to Spain and signed a permanent deal with Segunda División side Elche CF.

== Career statistics ==
As of match played 23 May 2026

Appearances and goals by club, season and competition
Club	Season	League			National cup (Note: Includes FA Cup and Copa del Rey)		League cup (Note: Includes EFL Cup)		Other		Total	
Club	Season	Division	Apps	Goals	Apps	Goals	Apps	Goals	Apps	Goals	Apps	Goals
Tottenham Hotspur U21	2021–22	—			—		—		3 (Note: Appearance(s) in EFL Trophy)	1	3	1
Tottenham Hotspur U21	2022–23	—			—		—		3	0	3	0
Tottenham Hotspur U21	2023–24	—			—		—		2	0	2	0
Tottenham Hotspur U21	Total		—		—		—		8	1	8	1
Tottenham Hotspur	2022–23	Premier League	0	0	0	0	0	0	0	0	0	0
Tottenham Hotspur	2023–24	Premier League	0	0	0	0	0	0	0	0	0	0
Tottenham Hotspur	Total		0	0	0	0	0	0	0	0	0	0
Elche	2024–25	Segunda División	18	2	2	0	—		—		20	2
Elche	2025–26	La Liga	9	0	4	0	—		—		13	0
Elche	Total		27	2	6	0	—		—		33	2
Career total			27	2	6	0	0	0	8	1	41	3
