= Festa d'Elx Trophy =

- Organiser(s): (Spain) Elche CF
- Founded: 1960; 66 years ago
- Region: Alicante, Spain
- Teams: 2
- Related competitions: Trofeo Costa del Sol
- Current champions: (Italy) Parma Calcio 1913 (2023)
- Most championships: (Spain) Elche (27 titles)

The Festa d'Elx Trophy is an annual football friendly trophy hosted by Spanish club Elche CF. Founded in 1960, it is the sixth oldest Spanish summer trophy. It is held on August 15 along with the Misteri d'Elx, also known as La Festa d'Elx, hence its name. The trophy is a reproduction of the Lady of Elche.

== List of champions ==
Ed.	Year	Champion	Score	Runner-up	Third
1	1960	(Spain) Levante	4–1	(Spain) Elche	(Spain) Hércules
2	1961	(Spain) Elche	2–1	(Spain) Real Valladolid	(Spain) Levante
3	1962	(Spain) Elche	1–1	Sporting Portugal	(France) Racing Strasbourg
4	1963	(Spain) Elche	3–1	(Spain) Sevilla	(Spain) Levante
5	1964	(Spain) Levante	3-3	(Spain) Elche	(Spain) Real Murcia
6	1965	(Spain) Elche	2–1	(Spain) Athletic Bilbao	(Portugal) Os Belenenses
7	1966	(Spain) Español	2–0	(Spain) Elche	(Portugal) Porto
8	1967	(Argentina) Independiente	3–2	(Spain) Elche	– (Note: Two teams-tournamente.)
9	1968	(Spain) Elche	4–1	(Paraguay) Guaraní	–
10	1969	(Argentina) Estudiantes (LP)	2–1	(Spain) Elche	–
11	1970	(Spain) Barcelona	1–0	(Spain) Elche	–
12	1971	(Hungary) Ferencvárosi	1–0	(Spain) Elche	(Greece) Panathinaikos
13	1972	(Spain) Elche	3–2	(Hungary) Budapest Honvéd	(Romania) Rapid București
14	1973	(Spain) Elche	1–0	(West Germany) 1860 Munich	–
15	1974	(Spain) Elche	2–2	(Bulgaria) Levski Sofia	–
16	1975	(Spain) Real Murcia	0–0	(Spain) Elche	(Hungary) Zalaegerszegi
17	1976	(Spain) Elche	2–0	(Portugal) Os Belenenses	–
18	1977	(Spain) Elche	3–1	(Spain) Real Murcia	(Uruguay) Nacional
19	1978	(Spain) Elche	1–1	(Spain) Barcelona	–
20	1979	(Brazil) Vasco da Gama	2–1	(Spain) Elche	–
21	1980	(Spain) Elche	2–0	(Spain) Real Murcia	–
22	1981	(Spain) Elche	2–1	(Spain) Real Madrid	–
23	1982	(Spain) Elche	2–1	(Brazil) Internacional	–
24	1983	(Spain) Real Murcia	1–0	(Spain) Elche	(Hungary) Ferencvárosi
25	1984	(Spain) Real Madrid	1–0	(Spain) Elche	–
26	1985	(Spain) Real Madrid	3–0	(Spain) Elche	–
27	1986	(Spain) Elche	2–1	(Spain) Barcelona	–
28	1987	(Spain) Elche	2–1	(Spain) Atlético Madrid	–
29	1988	(Spain) Elche	3–1	Paraguay	–
30	1989	(Spain) Barcelona	4–1	(Spain) Elche	–
31	1990	(Spain) Zaragoza	4–2	(Spain) Elche	–
32	1991	(Spain) Valencia	2–0	(Spain) Elche	–
33	1992	(Spain) Elche	2–0	(Uruguay) Nacional	–
34	1993	(Spain) Elche	2–0	(Brazil) Botafogo	–
35	1994	(Spain) Elche	2–1	(Spain) Valencia	–
36	1995	Morocco (Note: National team squad.)	1–1	(Spain) Elche	–
37	1996	(Spain) Elche	1–0	(Spain) Hércules	–
38	1997	(Spain) Elche	1–0	(Spain) Mallorca	–
39	1998	(Hungary) Vasas	2–1	(Spain) Elche	–
40	1999	(Spain) Real Madrid	4–2	(Spain) Elche	–
41	2000	(Spain) Osasuna	1–0	(Spain) Elche	–
42	2001	(Spain) Villarreal	2–2	(Spain) Elche	–
43	2002	(Spain) Real Murcia	1–1 (? p)	(Spain) Elche	–
44	2003	(Spain) Barcelona	0–0 (3–1 p)	(Spain) Elche	–
45	2004	(Spain) Dep. La Coruña	1–1	(Spain) Elche	–
46	2005	(Spain) Elche	2–0	(Spain) Atlético Madrid	–
47	2006	(Spain) Elche	1–0	(Spain) Levante	–
48	2007	(Spain) Mallorca	2–0	(Spain) Elche	–
49	2008	(Spain) Betis	3–0	(Spain) Elche	–
50	2009	(Spain) Elche	2–1	(Spain) Almería	–
51	2010	(Spain) Hércules	1–0	(Spain) Elche	–
52	2011	(Spain) Villarreal	2–0	(Spain) Elche	–
53	2012	(Spain) Almería	3–1	(Spain) Elche	–
54	2013	(Portugal) Benfica	3–1	(Spain) Elche	–
55	2014	(Spain) Elche	1–1 (7–6 p)	(Spain) Villarreal	–
56	2015	(Spain) Almería	1–0	(Spain) Elche	–
57	2016	(Qatar) Al-Rayyan	0–0 (4–3 p)	(Spain) Elche	–
58	2017	(Spain) Levante	2–0	(Spain) Elche	–
59	2018	(Spain) Elche	1–0	(Spain) Almería	–
–	2019–21	(Not held)			
60	2022	(England) Leeds United	2–1	(Spain) Elche	–
61	2023	(Italy) Parma	1–1(2–4 p)	(Spain) Elche	–
62	2024	(Spain) Levante	1–0	(Spain) Elche	–

== Most winners ==
Club	Titles
(Spain) Elche	27
(Spain) Real Murcia	3
(Spain) Real Madrid	3
(Spain) Barcelona	3
(Spain) Levante	3
(Spain) Villarreal	2
(Spain) Almería	2
(England) Leeds United	1
(Italy) Parma	1
