= John Chetauya =

Spanish footballer (born 2000)

Personal information
- Full name: John Chetauya Donald
- Birth name: John Nwankwo Donald Okeh
- Date of birth: 25 September 2000 (age 26)
- Place of birth: Murcia, Spain
- Height: 1.85 m (6 ft 1 in)
- Positions: Centre-back; defensive midfielder

Team information
- Current team: Mallorca (on loan from Elche)
- Number: 15

Youth career
- Murcia
- 2015–2020: Villarreal

Senior career*
Years	Team	Apps	(Gls)
2019–2020	Villarreal C	8	(0)
2020–2023	Elche B	20	(1)
2020–	Elche	78	(4)
2026–	→ Mallorca (loan)	5	(0)
- * Club domestic league appearances and goals as of 17 October 2026

John Chetauya Donald (née John Nwankwo Donald Okeh; born 25 September 2000), also mononymously known as John, is a Spanish professional footballer who plays as either a central defender or a defensive midfielder for RCD Mallorca, on loan from Elche CF.

== Career ==
Born in Murcia, John joined Villarreal CF's youth setup in 2015, from Real Murcia. He made his senior debut with the C-team on 24 August 2019, coming on as a second-half substitute in a 3–0 Tercera División away win against CF Recambios Colón.

In September 2020, John joined Elche CF and was initially assigned to the reserves also in the fourth division. He scored his first senior goal on 22 November, netting the equalizer in a 2–2 draw at Hércules CF B.

John made his first team debut on 16 December 2020, starting and scoring an own goal in a 2–1 away win against CD Buñol, for the season's Copa del Rey. His La Liga debut occurred three days later, as he started in a 3–1 away loss against Atlético Madrid but was replaced at half-time.

On 4 February 2022, John renewed his contract with the Franjiverdes until 2025. In May of the following year, after being regularly used under manager Sebastián Beccacece, he was definitely promoted to the main squad.

On 15 March 2024, John further extended his link until 2028, and scored his first professional goal on 27 April, netting the equalizer in a 2–2 Segunda División home draw against RCD Espanyol. He scored twice in 23 appearances overall during the 2024–25 campaign, as the club returned to the top tier after two years.

John scored his first goal in the main category of Spanish football on 28 September 2025, netting the winner in a 2–1 home success over RC Celta de Vigo. The following 31 August, after being mainly a backup option, he was loaned to RCD Mallorca in the second division.

== Personal life ==
Born in Murcia, Spain, John is Nigerian. Both of his parents were born in Nigeria and moved to Spain.

== Career statistics ==
As of match played 17 October 2026

Appearances and goals by club, season and competition
Club	Season	League			Cup		Europe		Other		Total	
Club	Season	Division	Apps	Goals	Apps	Goals	Apps	Goals	Apps	Goals	Apps	Goals
Villarreal C	2019–20	Tercera División	8	0	—		—		—		8	0
Elche B	2020–21	Tercera División	10	0	—		—		1 (Note: Appearance in 2021 Tercera División play-offs)	0	11	0
Elche B	2021–22	Tercera Federación	10	0	—		—		—		10	0
Elche B	Total		20	0	—		—		1	0	21	0
Elche	2020–21	La Liga	2	0	2	0	—		—		4	0
Elche	2021–22	La Liga	2	0	3	0	—		—		5	0
Elche	2022–23	La Liga	14	0	1	0	—		—		15	0
Elche	2023–24	Segunda División	20	1	1	0	—		—		21	1
Elche	2024–25	Segunda División	19	2	4	0	—		—		23	2
Elche	2025–26	La Liga	21	1	2	0	—		—		23	1
Elche	Total		78	4	13	0	—		—		91	4
Mallorca (loan)	2026–27	Segunda División	5	0	0	0	—		—		5	0
Career total			110	4	13	0	0	0	1	0	124	4
