= Víctor Chust =

Spanish footballer

Personal information
- Full name: Víctor Chust García
- Date of birth: 5 March 2000 (age 26)
- Place of birth: Valencia, Spain
- Height: 1.84 m (6 ft 0 in)
- Position: Centre-back

Team information
- Current team: Elche
- Number: 23

Youth career
- 2008–2012: Valencia
- 2012–2019: Real Madrid

Senior career*
Years	Team	Apps	(Gls)
2019–2021	Real Madrid B	26	(0)
2021–2022	Real Madrid	2	(0)
2021–2022	→ Cádiz (loan)	25	(0)
2022–2026	Cádiz	76	(4)
2025–2026	→ Elche (loan)	31	(1)
2026–	Elche	0	(0)

International career^{‡}
2016–2017	Spain U17	19	(0)
2018–2019	Spain U19	10	(0)
2021–2022	Spain U21	6	(0)
Medal record
Men's football
Representing Spain
UEFA European Under-19 Championship
Winner	2019 Armenia
FIFA U-17 World Cup
Runner-up	2017 India
UEFA European Under-17 Championship
Winner	2017 Croatia
- * Club domestic league appearances and goals as of 27 May 2026 ‡ National team caps and goals as of 27 September 2022

Víctor Chust García (born 5 March 2000) is a Spanish professional footballer who plays as a centre-back for La Liga club Elche.

== Career ==
=== Real Madrid ===
After receiving a start in the 2020–21 Copa del Rey against Alcoyano on 21 January 2021, which finished in a 2–1 defeat, Chust made his La Liga debut on 9 February 2021, after coming on as a late substitute in a 2–0 victory over Getafe.

=== Cádiz ===
In August 2021, Chust was loaned for the 2021–22 season to Cádiz. On 6 July 2022, Cádiz and Real Madrid reached an agreement over the permanent transfer of Chust to the Andalusian club, with Madrid keeping a percentage of his rights.

On 9 October 2022, Chust scored his first La Liga goal for Cádiz against Espanyol, resulted in a 2–2 draw.

=== Elche ===
On 7 August 2025, Chust was loaned to Elche in the top tier. On 17 June of the following year, the club exercised his buyout clause, and he signed a permanent three-year contract.

== Career statistics ==
As of 23 May 2026

Appearances and goals by club, season and competition
Club	Season	League			National cup		Continental		Other		Total	
Club	Season	Division	Apps	Goals	Apps	Goals	Apps	Goals	Apps	Goals	Apps	Goals
Real Madrid Castilla	2019–20	Segunda División B	9	0	—		—		0	0	9	0
Real Madrid Castilla	2020–21	Segunda División B	17	0	—		—		0	0	17	0
Real Madrid Castilla	Total		26	0	—		—		0	0	26	0
Real Madrid	2020–21	La Liga	2	0	1	0	0	0	0	0	3	0
Cádiz (loan)	2021–22	La Liga	25	0	4	0	—		—		29	0
Cádiz	2022–23	La Liga	14	1	0	0	—		—		14	1
Cádiz	2023–24	La Liga	22	0	2	0	—		—		24	0
Cádiz	2024–25	Segunda División	40	3	1	0	—		—		41	3
Cádiz	Total		76	4	3	0	—		—		79	4
Elche (loan)	2025–26	La Liga	31	1	2	0	—		—		33	1
Career total			160	5	10	0	0	0	0	0	170	5

== Honours ==
Real Madrid

- UEFA Youth League: 2019–20

Spain U17

- UEFA European Under-17 Championship: 2017
- FIFA Under-17 World Cup: Runner-up 2017

Spain U19

- UEFA European Under-19 Championship: 2019
