= Buba Sangaré =

Spanish footballer (born 2007)

Personal information
- Full name: Aboubacar Sangaré Traoré
- Date of birth: 6 August 2007 (age 19)
- Place of birth: Elche, Spain
- Height: 1.83 m (6 ft 0 in)
- Position: Right-back

Team information
- Current team: Elche
- Number: 2

Youth career
- Ilicitano Sporting
- 2018–2019: Levante
- 2019–2020: Patacona
- 2020–2021: Levante
- 2021–2022: Patacona
- 2022–2024: Levante
- 2024–2026: Roma

Senior career*
Years	Team	Apps	(Gls)
2023–2024	Levante	2	(0)
2024–2026	Roma	0	(0)
2026	→ Elche (loan)	12	(0)
2026–	Elche	10	(1)

International career^{‡}
2021–2022	Spain U15	8	(0)
2022–2023	Spain U16	7	(0)
2023–2024	Spain U17	13	(0)
2024–	Spain U19	9	(0)
Medal record
Men's football
Representing Spain
UEFA European Under-19 Championship
Winner	2026 Wales
- * Club domestic league appearances and goals as of 27 May 2026 ‡ National team caps and goals as of 23:04, 12 July 2026 (UTC)

Aboubacar "Buba" Sangaré Traoré (born 6 August 2007) is a Spanish professional footballer who plays as a right-back for La Liga club Elche.

== Club career ==
=== Levante ===
Born in Elche to Malian parents, Sangaré joined Levante's youth setup in September 2018, from Ilicitano Sporting CF. After progressing through the youth setup and alternating between the squads of Levante and affiliated club Patacona, he started to train with the first team under manager Javier Calleja in November 2023.

On 6 December 2023, before even having appeared for the reserves, Sangaré made his professional debut by starting in a 1–0 home loss to Amorebieta, for the season's Copa del Rey; aged 16 years and four months, he became the youngest player to play his first match for the club. He went on to make two more appearances for Levante's first team in the league.

=== Roma ===
On 1 July 2024, Sangaré joined Italian Serie A side Roma for an undisclosed fee, reported to be in the region of €1.5–2 million.

=== Elche ===
On 2 February 2026, Sangaré returned to Spain and moved to his hometown club Elche in La Liga, on a six-month loan until the end of the season, with an option to buy. On 3 June, the club activated the clause, with the player signing a permanent five-year contract.

== International career ==
Sangaré represented Spain at under-15, under-16 and under-17 levels.

== Honours ==
Spain U19

- UEFA European Under-19 Championship: 2026
