= Tete Morente =

Spanish association football player

Personal information
- Full name: José Antonio Morente Oliva
- Date of birth: 4 December 1996 (age 29)
- Place of birth: La Línea, Spain
- Height: 1.80 m (5 ft 11 in)
- Position: Winger

Team information
- Current team: Elche
- Number: 15

Youth career
- Taraguilla
- 2013: Atlético Zabal
- 2013–2014: Taraguilla
- 2014–2015: Atlético Madrid

Senior career*
Years	Team	Apps	(Gls)
2015	Atlético Madrid C	6	(1)
2015–2016	Atlético Madrid B	22	(2)
2016–2017	Atlético Baleares	23	(1)
2017–2019	Gimnàstic	39	(3)
2019	→ Lugo (loan)	13	(1)
2019–2020	Lugo	16	(0)
2020	Málaga	16	(2)
2020–2024	Elche	133	(17)
2024–2026	Lecce	47	(3)
2026–	Elche	13	(1)
- * Club domestic league appearances and goals as of 27 May 2026

José Antonio "Tete" Morente Oliva (born 4 December 1996) is a Spanish professional footballer who plays as a left winger for Elche CF.

== Career ==
Born in La Línea de la Concepción, Cádiz, Andalusia, Morente joined Atlético Madrid's youth setup on 18 January 2014, after stints at AD Taraguilla and Atlético Zabal. He made his senior debut with the C-team on 2 April 2015, starting in a 4–1 Tercera División away loss against Internacional de Madrid CF.

Morente scored his first senior goal on 19 April 2015, netting the equalizer in a 2–1 home win against rivals Real Madrid C. He was promoted to the reserves ahead of the 2015–16 season, with the side now in the fourth tier.

On 31 August 2016, Morente signed a one-year deal with Segunda División B club CD Atlético Baleares. The following 9 July, he agreed to a four-year contract with Gimnàstic de Tarragona in Segunda División.

Morente made his professional debut on 20 August 2017, coming on as a late substitute for Juan Delgado in a 1–0 home loss against UD Almería. He scored his first professional goal the following 4 March, netting the opener in a 2–1 home loss against CD Tenerife.

On 25 January 2019, Morente was loaned to fellow second division side CD Lugo for six months. On 30 June, after avoiding relegation, he was bought by the Galicians due to an obligatory clause on his contract; he signed a permanent deal until 2022.

On 30 January 2020, Morente signed a one-and-a-half-year contract with Málaga CF, still in the second division. On 16 September, he agreed to a four-year deal with Elche CF, newly-promoted to La Liga.

Morente made his debut in the main category of Spanish football on 26 September 2020, starting in a 3–0 home loss to Real Sociedad. He scored his first goal in the division on 18 October, netting the club's second in a 2–0 away win over Deportivo Alavés.

On 19 June 2024, Morente moved abroad for the first time in his career, signing a three-year contract with US Lecce in the Italian Serie A. On 2 February 2026, he returned to Elche on a two-and-a-half-year contract.

== Career statistics ==
As of match played 25 May 2025

Appearances and goals by club, season and competition
Club	Season	League			National cup		Other		Total	
Club	Season	Division	Apps	Goals	Apps	Goals	Apps	Goals	Apps	Goals
Atlético Madrid C	2014–15	Tercera División	6	1	—		—		6	1
Atlético Madrid B	2015–16	Tercera División	22	2	—		—		22	2
Atlético Baleares	2016–17	Segunda División B	23	1	0	0	—		23	1
Gimnàstic	2017–18	Segunda División	25	2	1	0	—		26	2
Gimnàstic	2018–19	Segunda División	14	1	1	0	—		15	1
Gimnàstic	Total		39	3	2	0	0	0	41	3
Lugo (loan)	2018–19	Segunda División	13	1	0	0	—		13	1
Lugo	2019–20	Segunda División	16	0	0	0	—		16	0
Lugo	Total		29	1	0	0	0	0	29	1
Málaga	2019–20	Segunda División	15	2	0	0	—		15	2
Málaga	2020–21	Segunda División	1	0	0	0	—		1	0
Málaga	Total		16	2	0	0	0	0	16	2
Elche	2020–21	La Liga	29	2	1	0	—		30	2
Elche	2021–22	La Liga	32	3	2	0	—		34	3
Elche	2022–23	La Liga	32	4	3	1	—		35	5
Elche	2023–24	Segunda División	39	8	1	0	—		40	8
Elche	Total		132	14	7	1	0	0	139	15
Lecce	2024–25	Serie A	31	3	1	0	—		32	3
Career total			298	24	10	1	0	0	308	25
