= Mourad El Ghezouani =

Footballer (born 1998)

Personal information
- Full name: Mourad Daoudi El Ghezouani
- Date of birth: 27 May 1998 (age 28)
- Place of birth: Balsapintada, Spain
- Height: 1.88 m (6 ft 2 in)
- Position: Striker

Team information
- Current team: Tijuana
- Number: 9

Youth career
- Balsapintada
- Fuente Álamo
- Murcia
- Torre Pacheco
- 2016–2017: Villarreal

Senior career*
Years	Team	Apps	(Gls)
2017–2018	Villarreal C	24	(4)
2018–2019	Orihuela	24	(5)
2019–2020	Elche B	21	(6)
2019–2025	Elche	68	(14)
2020–2021	→ Alcoyano (loan)	22	(4)
2021–2022	→ Alcoyano (loan)	34	(7)
2022–2023	→ Burgos (loan)	35	(3)
2025–	Tijuana	37	(9)

International career
2016	Morocco U20		
- * Club domestic league appearances and goals as of 11 October 2026

Mourad Daoudi El Ghezouani (born 27 May 1998), simply known as Mourad, is a professional footballer who plays as a striker for Liga MX club Tijuana. Born in Spain, he represents Morocco internationally.

== Club career ==
Mourad was born in Balsapintada, Fuente Álamo de Murcia, Murcia. An EF Torre Pacheco youth graduate, he moved to Villarreal CF in July 2016, and made his senior debut with the C-team on 5 February of the following year, playing the last 14 minutes of a 1–0 Tercera División away win against CE Almassora.

On 18 July 2018, Mourad moved to fellow fourth division side Orihuela CF. Roughly one year later he signed for Elche CF, being assigned to the reserves also in level four.

Mourad made his first team debut for Elche on 15 December 2019, coming on as a late substitute for Josan in a 2–3 home loss against UD Las Palmas in the Segunda División. Two days later he scored his first goal for the Franjiverdes, netting the opener in a 2–0 away defeat of Gimnástica Segoviana CF for the season's Copa del Rey.

On 6 October 2020, Mourad was loaned to Segunda División B side CD Alcoyano for the 2020–21 season. The following 20 August, he returned to the club on loan for a further year.

On 1 September 2022, Mourad joined second division team Burgos CF on loan for one year. He scored his first professional goal on 16 October, netting a last-minute winner in a 2–1 home success over CD Mirandés.

Back to Elche in July 2023, Mourad started to feature more regularly with the side, and renewed his contract until 2027 on 17 March 2024. He scored ten goals overall during the 2024–25 campaign, being the club's top scorer as they achieved promotion to La Liga.
