= Ali Houary =

Spanish footballer

Personal information
- Full name: Ali Houary Jeddoub
- Date of birth: 5 August 2005 (age 21)
- Place of birth: Orihuela, Spain
- Height: 1.78 m (5 ft 10 in)
- Positions: Attacking midfielder; winger

Team information
- Current team: Elche

Youth career
- 2011–2023: Elche

Senior career*
Years	Team	Apps	(Gls)
2023–2026	Elche B	55	(8)
2024–	Elche	3	(0)
2026	→ Mirandés (loan)	15	(0)

International career^{‡}
2023–	Morocco U20	3	(1)
- * Club domestic league appearances and goals as of 9 June 2026 ‡ National team caps and goals as of 26 January 2024

Ali Houary Jeddoub (Arabic: علي هواري جدوب; born 5 August 2005) is a professional footballer who plays as either an attacking midfielder or a left winger for Spanish club Elche CF. Born in Spain, he represents Morocco internationally.

== Club career ==
Born in Orihuela to Moroccan parents, Houary joined Elche CF's youth sides in 2011, aged five. On 11 August 2023, after spending the pre-season with the main squad, he renewed his contract with the club.

Houary made his senior debut with the reserves on 11 November 2023, coming on as a late substitute for Rafa Núñez in a 3–1 Tercera Federación away win over Villarreal CF C. He scored his first senior goal the following 28 March, netting the B's third in a 3–0 home win over the same opponent.

On 15 July 2024, Houary further extended his link with the Franjiverdes until 2028. He made his first team debut on 30 October, starting in a 3–0 away win over CD Coria, for the season's Copa del Rey.

Houary made his professional debut on 2 November 2024, replacing Nico Fernández Mercau late into a 2–0 Segunda División away win over SD Eibar. He made his La Liga debut on 18 August of the following year, starting in a 1–1 home draw against Real Betis.

On 22 January 2026, Houary was loaned to CD Mirandés in the second division until the end of the season.

== International career ==
Eligible to represent either Morocco or Spain, Houary was called up to the former's under-20 team in September 2023.
