= Martim Neto =

Portuguese footballer

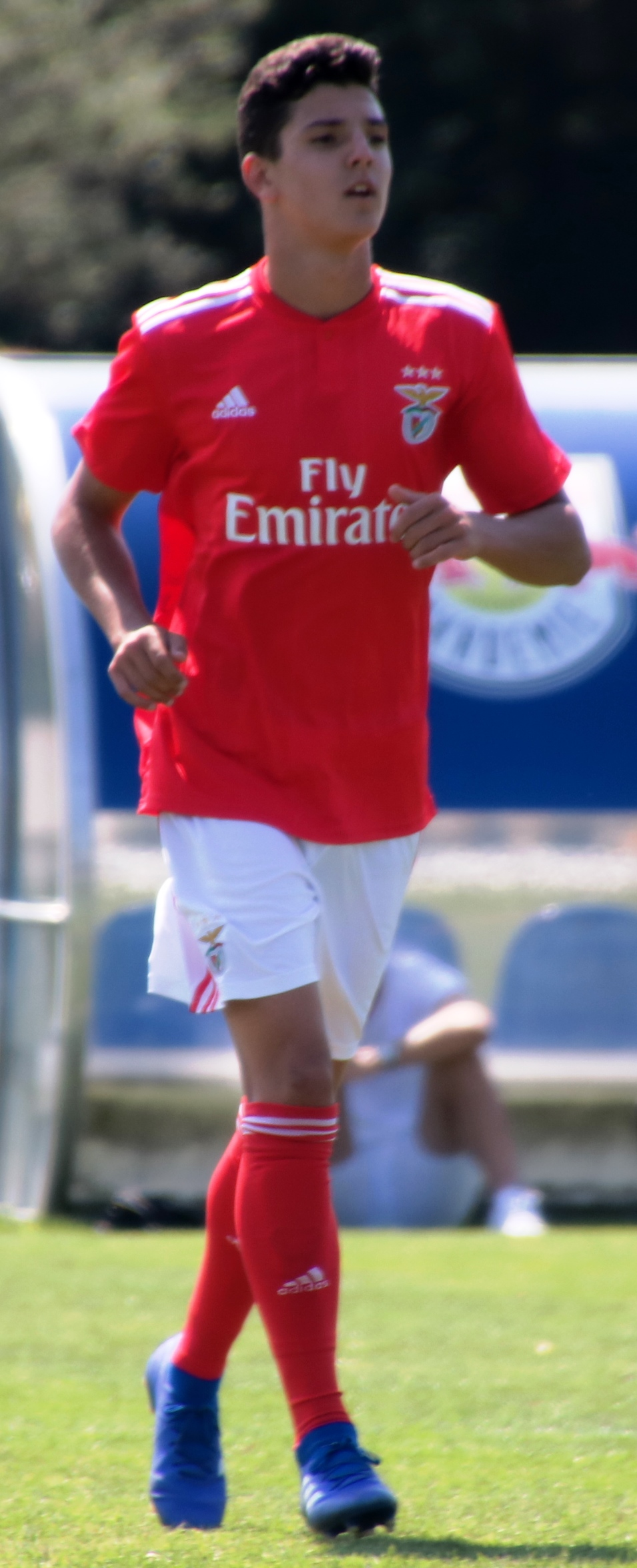
- Neto playing for Benfica in 2018

Personal information
- Full name: Martim Carvalho Neto
- Date of birth: 14 January 2003 (age 23)
- Place of birth: Viana do Castelo, Portugal
- Height: 1.85 m (6 ft 1 in)
- Position: Midfielder

Team information
- Current team: Elche
- Number: 16

Youth career
- 2010–2014: Perspectiva em Jogo
- 2014–2015: Póvoa de Lanhoso
- 2015–2022: Benfica

Senior career*
Years	Team	Apps	(Gls)
2021–2025	Benfica B	54	(4)
2022–2025	Benfica	1	(0)
2023–2024	→ Gil Vicente (loan)	29	(0)
2024–2025	→ Rio Ave (loan)	24	(2)
2025–	Elche	25	(2)

International career^{‡}
2019	Portugal U16	9	(1)
2019	Portugal U17	6	(0)
2020–2021	Portugal U18	2	(0)
2022–	Portugal U19	4	(0)
2022–	Portugal U20	2	(0)
- * Club domestic league appearances and goals as of 27 May 2026 ‡ National team caps and goals as of 27 September 2022

Martim Carvalho Neto (born 14 January 2003) is a Portuguese professional footballer who plays as a midfielder for La Liga club Elche.

== Career ==
Neto made his professional debut for Benfica B on 21 March 2021 in the Liga Portugal 2.

On 1 August 2023, Benfica sent Neto on a season-long loan to Primeira Liga side Gil Vicente. On 30 July 2025, after another loan spell at Rio Ave, he joined La Liga side Elche on a three-year contract. He scored his debut goal in La Liga in a 4–0 thrashing against Rayo Vallecano on 22 December.

== Career statistics ==
=== Club ===
As of match played 23 May 2026

Appearances and goals by club, season and competition
Club	Season	League			National cup (Note: Includes Copa del Rey and Taça de Portugal)		Continental		Other		Total	
Club	Season	Division	Apps	Goals	Apps	Goals	Apps	Goals	Apps	Goals	Apps	Goals
Benfica B	2020–21	Liga Portugal 2	8	0	—		—		—		8	0
Benfica B	2021–22	Liga Portugal 2	30	3	—		—		—		30	3
Benfica B	2022–23	Liga Portugal 2	16	1	—		—		—		16	1
Benfica B	Total		54	4			—		—		54	4
Benfica	2021–22	Primeira Liga	1	0	—		—		—		1	0
Gil Vicente	2023–24	Primeira Liga	29	0	4	1	—		—		33	1
Rio Ave	2024–25	Primeira Liga	24	2	3	0	—		—		27	2
Elche	2025–26	La Liga	25	2	4	1	—		—		29	3
Career total			133	8	11	2	—		—		144	10

== Honours ==
Benfica

- Campeonato Nacional de Juniores: 2021–22
- UEFA Youth League: 2021–22
- Under-20 Intercontinental Cup: 2022
