= Marc Aguado =

Spanish footballer (born 2000)

Personal information
- Full name: Marc Aguado Pallarés
- Date of birth: 22 February 2000 (age 26)
- Place of birth: Zaragoza, Spain
- Height: 1.78 m (5 ft 10 in)
- Position: Midfielder

Team information
- Current team: Elche
- Number: 8

Youth career
- Zaragoza

Senior career*
Years	Team	Apps	(Gls)
2018–2020	Zaragoza B	62	(5)
2020–2025	Zaragoza	52	(0)
2020–2023	→ Andorra (loan)	81	(0)
2025–	Elche	50	(2)
- * Club domestic league appearances and goals as of 23 August 2026

Marc Aguado Pallarés (born 22 February 2000) is a Spanish footballer who plays as a midfielder for La Liga club Elche.

== Club career ==
Born in Zaragoza, Aragon, Aguado represented Real Zaragoza as a youth, and made his senior debut with the reserves on 26 August 2018 by starting in a 1–0 Tercera División away loss against SD Tarazona. He scored his first senior goal on 23 September, netting the opener in a 2–1 away win over AD San Juan.

On 11 August 2020, after being a regular starter for the B-side, Aguado was loaned to Segunda División B side FC Andorra, for one year. The following 31 May, his contract with Zaragoza was extended until 2023, and his loan was renewed for a further season on 25 June 2021.

Aguado was a regular starter for the Andorrans during the campaign, appearing in 34 matches overall as the club achieved a first-ever promotion to Segunda División. On 1 July 2022, his loan was extended to cover the 2022–23 season, with his contract being renewed until 2025.

Aguado made his professional debut on 15 August 2022, starting in a 1–0 away win over Real Oviedo. On 3 February 2025, he moved to fellow division two side Elche CF, and appeared in 13 matches for the remainder of the season as the club achieved promotion to La Liga.

Aguado made his debut in the top tier of Spanish football on 18 August 2025, starting in a 1–1 home draw against Real Betis. He subsequently established himself as a starter, and scored his first professional goal on 1 March 2026, netting his side's first in a 2–2 home draw against RCD Espanyol.

== Personal life ==
Aguado's father Xavi was also a footballer. A centre-back, he spent the most of his career with Zaragoza.
