= Josan (footballer) =

Spanish footballer (born 1989)

Personal information
- Full name: José Antonio Ferrández Pomares
- Date of birth: 3 December 1989 (age 36)
- Place of birth: Crevillent, Spain
- Height: 1.75 m (5 ft 9 in)
- Position: Winger

Team information
- Current team: Elche
- Number: 17

Youth career
- Crevillente
- 2006–2008: Elche

Senior career*
Years	Team	Apps	(Gls)
2008–2010	Horadada	?	(14)
2010–2011	Villajoyosa	15	(1)
2011	Crevillente	12	(3)
2011–2014	La Hoya Lorca	95	(13)
2014–2015	Granada	0	(0)
2014–2015	→ Huesca (loan)	28	(2)
2015–2016	Alcorcón	0	(0)
2016	→ UCAM Murcia (loan)	16	(2)
2016–2017	Albacete	36	(3)
2018–	Elche	263	(15)
- * Club domestic league appearances and goals as of 25 May 2026

José Antonio Ferrández Pomares (born 3 December 1989), commonly known as Josan, is a Spanish professional footballer who plays as a right winger for La Liga club Elche CF.

== Club career ==
Born in Crevillent, Alicante, Valencian Community, Josan finished his formation with Elche CF, but made his debuts as a senior with UD Horadada in 2008, in the regional leagues. In the 2010 summer he joined Villajoyosa CF in Tercera División, but moved to fellow league team Crevillente Deportivo – a club he already represented as a youth – in January of the following year.

In July 2011 Josan signed for La Hoya Lorca CF, also in the fourth level. He contributed with 28 appearances and six goals in the 2012–13 campaign, as his side achieved promotion to Segunda División B for the first time ever.

On 22 January 2014, Josan agreed to a move to La Liga side Granada CF, with the deal being effective in July. On 23 July he was loaned to SD Huesca in the third division, for one year.

Josan appeared in 33 matches and scored three goals for the Aragonese side, which returned to Segunda División after a two-year absence. On 15 July 2015 he signed for AD Alcorcón, also in the second tier.

On 9 September 2015, Josan made his professional debut, coming on as a second-half substitute for Fede Vega in a 1–0 home loss against SD Ponferradina, for the season's Copa del Rey. On 28 December, after failing to make a league appearance for the club, he was loaned to UCAM Murcia CF until June.

After achieving promotion to the second tier with the Universitarios, Josan had his contract automatically renewed on 7 June 2016. On 8 August, however, he left the club and signed for Albacete Balompié, achieving another third level promotion.

On 30 December 2017, Josan cut ties with Alba, and signed for Elche CF in the third division the following day. He was regularly used in the following years, contributing with one goal in 44 appearances overall during the 2019–20 campaign as the club achieved promotion to La Liga.

Josan made his debut in the main category of Spanish football on 26 September 2020, starting in a 3–0 home loss to Real Sociedad. He scored his first goal in the division on 23 October, netting the opener in a 2–1 home win over Valencia CF.

On 4 July 2025, after helping the Franjiverdes in another top tier promotion, Josan agreed to a one-year extension.

== Career statistics ==
=== Club ===
As of match played 17 May 2026

Appearances and goals by club, season and competition
Club	Season	League			National Cup		Other		Total	
Club	Season	Division	Apps	Goals	Apps	Goals	Apps	Goals	Apps	Goals
Villajoyosa	2010–11	Tercera División	15	1	—		—		15	1
Crevillente	2010–11	Tercera División	12	3	—		—		12	3
La Hoya Lorca	2011–12	Tercera División	30	2	—		—		30	2
La Hoya Lorca	2012–13	Tercera División	28	6	—		1 (Note: Appearance(s) in Promotion Playoffs)	0	29	6
La Hoya Lorca	2013–14	Segunda División B	35	5	1	0	2	0	38	5
La Hoya Lorca	Total		93	13	1	0	3	0	97	13
Granada	2014–15	La Liga	0	0	0	0	—		0	0
Huesca (loan)	2014–15	Segunda División B	28	2	4	0	5	1	37	3
Alcorcón	2015–16	Segunda División	0	0	1	0	—		1	0
UCAM Murcia (loan)	2015–16	Segunda División B	16	2	0	0	4	0	20	2
Albacete	2016–17	Segunda División B	32	3	3	0	6	0	41	3
Albacete	2017–18	Segunda División	4	0	1	0	—		5	0
Albacete	Total		36	3	4	0	6	0	46	3
Elche	2017–18	Segunda División B	13	0	0	0	6	0	19	0
Elche	2018–19	Segunda División	31	3	2	0	—		33	3
Elche	2019–20	Segunda División	38	1	2	0	4	0	44	1
Elche	2020–21	La Liga	33	4	2	0	—		35	4
Elche	2021–22	La Liga	31	2	3	0	—		34	2
Elche	2022–23	La Liga	26	1	2	0	—		28	1
Elche	2023–24	Segunda División	32	0	1	0	—		33	0
Elche	2024–25	Segunda División	32	4	0	0	—		32	4
Elche	2025–26	La Liga	19	0	4	0	—		23	0
Elche	Total		255	15	16	0	10	0	281	15
Career total			455	39	26	0	28	1	509	40

== Honours ==
La Hoya Lorca

- Tercera División: 2012–13

Huesca

- Segunda División B: 2014–15

UCAM Murcia

- Segunda División B: 2015–16
