= 2020–21 AD Alcorcón season =

AD Alcorcón
2020–21 season
- Owner: David Blitzer
- President: Iván Bravo
- Head coach: Mere
- Stadium: Santo Domingo
- Segunda División: 17th
- Copa del Rey: Round of 32
Home colours	Away colours	Third colours
- All statistics correct as of 30 May 2021.

The 2020–21 season was the 50th season of Agrupación Deportiva Alcorcón in existence and the club's eleventh consecutive season in the second division of Spanish football. In addition to the domestic league, Alcorcón participated in this season's edition of the Copa del Rey. The season covered the period from 21 July 2020 to 30 June 2021.

== Players ==
=== First-team squad ===
As of 17 June 2021

Note: Flags indicate national team as defined under FIFA eligibility rules; some limited exceptions apply. Players may hold more than one non-FIFA nationality.

No.	Pos.	Nation	Player
1	GK	ESP	Dani Jiménez
2	DF	ESP	Laure (captain)
3	DF	ESP	José Carlos
4	DF	PAN	Fidel Escobar
5	MF	ESP	Juan Aguilera
6	MF	ESP	Ander Gorostidi
8	MF	POR	Reko
9	FW	ESP	Marc Gual
10	MF	ESP	Hugo Fraile
11	MF	ESP	Ernesto Gómez
13	GK	ESP	Samu Casado
14	MF	ESP	Juanma Bravo

No.	Pos.	Nation	Player
16	DF	ESP	Carlos Bellvís
17	DF	VEN	Víctor García
18	FW	ESP	Xisco
19	DF	ESP	David Fernández
20	DF	ESP	José León
21	FW	ESP	Dani Ojeda
22	FW	ESP	Óscar Arribas
29	DF	ESP	Javier Castro
32	DF	ESP	Guito
35	GK	ESP	Chus Ruiz

=== Reserve team ===
Note: Flags indicate national team as defined under FIFA eligibility rules; some limited exceptions apply. Players may hold more than one non-FIFA nationality.

No.	Pos.	Nation	Player
34	GK	ESP	Carlos Mena
36	DF	ESP	Edu Viaña

No.	Pos.	Nation	Player
37	FW	ESP	Francisco Llario
38	MF	ESP	Aitor

=== Out on loan ===
Note: Flags indicate national team as defined under FIFA eligibility rules; some limited exceptions apply. Players may hold more than one non-FIFA nationality.

No.	Pos.	Nation	Player
—	DF	CUB	Cavafe (at Navalcarnero until 30 June 2021)
—	MF	ESP	Alfonso Martín (at Atlético Baleares until 30 June 2021)
—	MF	BIH	Armin Hodžić (at Estoril until 30 June 2021)

No.	Pos.	Nation	Player
—	MF	ESP	Pipo (at Cultural Leonesa until 30 June 2021)
—	FW	ESP	Álvaro Juan (at Cultural Leonesa until 30 June 2021)
—	FW	ESP	Ale Llamas (at Cultural Leonesa until 30 June 2021)

== Transfers ==
=== In ===
No.	Pos	Player	Transferred from	Fee	Date	Source
15			TBD		1 July 2020	

=== Out ===
No.	Pos	Player	Transferred to	Fee	Date	Source
23	FW	(Spain) Stoichkov	(Spain) Mallorca	Loan return	End of season	

== Pre-season and friendlies ==
Win Draw Loss Fixtures

2 September 2020 Friendly	Alcorcón	Cancelled	Cádiz	San Pedro de Alcántara, Spain
19:00 CEST (UTC+2)				Stadium: Marbella Football Center

5 September 2020 Friendly	Málaga	0–2	Alcorcón	Coín, Spain
19:30 CEST (UTC+2)			Barbero 41'; Gual 66'	Stadium: Estadio Jose Burgos De Quintana; Attendance: 0

== Competitions ==
=== Overview ===
Competition	First match	Last match	Starting round	Final position	Record							
Competition	First match	Last match	Starting round	Final position	Pld	W	D	L	GF	GA	GD	Win %
Segunda División	13 September 2020	30 May 2021	Matchday 1	17th	42	13	9	20	32	42	−10	30.95
Copa del Rey	16 December 2020	17 January 2021	First round	Round of 32	3	2	0	1	4	4	+0	66.67
Total					45	15	9	21	36	46	−10	33.33

Last updated: 30 May 2021
Source: Soccerway

=== Segunda División ===
==== League table ====
Pos	Team	Pld	W	D	L	GF	GA	GD	Pts	Promotion, qualification or relegation
15	Zaragoza	42	13	11	18	37	43	−6	50	
16	Cartagena	42	12	13	17	44	52	−8	49	
17	Alcorcón	42	13	9	20	32	42	−10	48	
18	Lugo	42	11	14	17	38	53	−15	47	
19	Sabadell (R)	42	11	13	18	40	48	−8	46	Relegation to Primera División RFEF

Source: LaLiga
Rules for classification: 1) points; 2) head-to-head points; 3) head-to-head goal difference; 4) goal difference; 5) number of goals scored
(R) Relegated

==== Results summary ====
Overall								Home						Away					
Pld	W	D	L	GF	GA	GD	Pts	W	D	L	GF	GA	GD	W	D	L	GF	GA	GD
42	13	9	20	32	42	−10	48	9	2	10	20	23	−3	4	7	10	12	19	−7

Last updated: 30 May 2021.
Source: La Liga

==== Results by round ====
Round	1	2	3	4	5	6	7	8	9	10	11	12	13	14	15	16	17	18	19	20	21	22	23	24	25	26	27	28	29	30	31	32	33	34	35	36	37	38	39	40	41	42
Ground	A	H	A	H	A	H	H	A	H	H	A	H	A	H	A	H	A	A	H	A	A	H	H	A	H	A	A	H	A	H	A	H	A	H	A	H	A	H	A	H	A	H
Result	D	W	L	L	L	L	L	L	L	L	L	W	W	W	D	L	D	D	W	L	D	L	L	L	W	W	L	W	D	L	D	D	L	W	W	L	W	D	L	W	L	W
Position	8	5	9	14	17	19	21	21	21	22	22	22	22	18	19	20	20	20	20	20	22	22	22	22	22	21	19	20	18	18	19	21	21	18	16	16	16	17	17	17	17	17

Updated to match(es) played on 30 May 2021. Source: La Liga
A = Away; H = Home; W = Win; D = Draw; L = Loss

==== Matches ====
The league fixtures were announced on 31 August 2020.

13 September 2020 1	Mirandés	0–0	Alcorcón	Miranda de Ebro
18:15 CEST (UTC+2)		Report		Stadium: Estadio Municipal de Anduva; Attendance: 0 (Note: The match was played behind closed doors due to the COVID-19 pandemic in Spain.); Referee: Jon Ander González Esteban

19 September 2020 2	Alcorcón	2–0	Tenerife	Alcorcón
18:15 CEST (UTC+2)	Barbero 74'; Fraile 84'	Report		Stadium: Santo Domingo; Attendance: 0 Referee: Óliver de la Fuente Ramos

26 September 2020 3	Málaga	1–0	Alcorcón	Málaga
18:15 CEST (UTC+2)	Cristian 43'; Ramón (yellow card) 66'	Report	Boateng (yellow card) 50' (yellow-red card) 85'	Stadium: La Rosaleda; Attendance: 0 Referee: Juan Luis Pulido Santana

3 October 2020 4	Alcorcón	0–3	Zaragoza	Alcorcón
16:00 CEST (UTC+2)	Fraile (yellow card) 15'	Report	Ros (yellow card) 63'; Buyla (red card) 63'	Stadium: Santo Domingo; Attendance: 0 Referee: Daniel Trujillo Suárez

10 October 2020 5	Espanyol	1–0	Alcorcón	Cornellà de Llobregat
16:00 CEST (UTC+2)	De Tomás 75'	Report	Laure (yellow card) 54'; Bravo (yellow card) 65'	Stadium: RCDE Stadium; Attendance: 0 Referee: Eduardo Prieto Iglesias

26 October 2020 8	Alcorcón	0–2	Mallorca	Alcorcón
18:00 CEST (UTC+2)	Sosa (yellow card) 30'	Report	Antonio Sánchez 18'; Cardona 22', (yellow card) 67'; Sastre (yellow card) 50'	Stadium: Santo Domingo; Attendance: 0 Referee: Daniel Ocón Arráiz

29 October 2020 9	Alcorcón	1–2	Sporting Gijón	Alcorcón
16:30 CET (UTC+1)	Sosa 75'; Óscar (yellow card) 85'	Report	Čumić (yellow card) 38'; Đurđević 64'; García 79'	Stadium: Santo Domingo; Attendance: 0 Referee: Alejandro Muñiz Ruiz

2 November 2020 10	UD Logroñés	1–0	Alcorcón	Logroño
16:00 CET (UTC+1)	Acevedo 41'; Clemente (yellow card) 49'	Report	Gorostidi (red card) 62'	Stadium: Las Gaunas; Attendance: 0 Referee: Iñaki Vicandi Garrido

5 November 2020 6	Alcorcón	0–1	Ponferradina	Alcorcón
19:00 CET (UTC+1)	Bravo (yellow card) 27'; Sosa (yellow card) 73'; Fernández (yellow card) 86'	Report	Larrea (yellow card) 43'; Kaxe 88'	Stadium: Santo Domingo; Attendance: 0 Referee: Jon González Esteban

8 November 2020 11	Alcorcón	0–3	Fuenlabrada	Alcorcón
16:00 CET (UTC+1)	Carlos (red card) 18'; Castro (yellow card) 27' (yellow-red card) 42'	Report	Gassama 10' (pen.), 52', 60'; Antonio Cristian (yellow card) 22'; Salvador (yellow card) 57'	Stadium: Santo Domingo; Attendance: 0 Referee: Iosu Galech Apezteguía

15 November 2020 12	Leganés	1–0	Alcorcón	Leganés
14:00 CET (UTC+1)	Pérez (yellow card) 49'; Arnaiz (yellow card) 58'; Merino 60'; Miquel (yellow card) 65'	Report	Laure (yellow card) 32' (yellow-red card) 87'; Óscar (yellow card) 36'	Stadium: Estadio Municipal de Butarque; Attendance: 0 Referee: Gorka Sagués Oscoz

20 November 2020 13	Alcorcón	1–0	Lugo	Alcorcón
19:00 CET (UTC+1)	Óscar (yellow card) 64'; Gual 82'; Sosa (red card) 88'	Report	Juanpe (yellow card) 24'; Torres (yellow card) 27'; Canella (yellow card) 37'	Stadium: Santo Domingo; Attendance: 0 Referee: Luis Milla Alvendiz

24 November 2020 14	Castellón	0–2	Alcorcón	Castellón de la Plana
19:00 CET (UTC+1)	Fidalgo (yellow card) 23'; Gustavo (yellow card) 44'; Cubillas (yellow card) 71'; Satrústegui (yellow card) 87'	Report	Gual 31' (pen.), 45' (pen.); Laure (yellow card) 56'; Álvaro (red card) 82'; José León (yellow card) 90+1'	Stadium: Nou Estadi Castàlia; Attendance: 0 Referee: Jon González Esteban

27 November 2020 15	Alcorcón	1–0	Girona	Alcorcón
19:00 CET (UTC+1)	José Carlos (yellow card) 76'; Óscar 83'	Report	Cristóforo (yellow card) 28'; Bárcenas (yellow card) 78'	Stadium: Santo Domingo; Attendance: 0 Referee: Iñaki Vicandi Garrido

3 December 2020 16	Oviedo	1–1	Alcorcón	Oviedo
19:00 CET (UTC+1)	Sánchez (yellow card) 26'; Blanco (yellow card) 41'; Fernández (yellow card) 45'; Teguia (yellow card) 87'; Sangalli (yellow card) 89', (goal) 90+1'	Report	José León (yellow card) 50'; Fraile 88' (pen.)	Stadium: Carlos Tartiere; Attendance: 0 Referee: Rafael Sánchez López

6 December 2020 17	Alcorcón	0–1	Almería	Alcorcón
14:00 CET (UTC+1)		Report	Corpas (yellow card) 46'; Sadiq 59'; Costa (yellow card) 72'; Makaridze (yellow card) 83'	Stadium: Santo Domingo; Attendance: 0 Referee: José Antonio López Toca

9 December 2020 7	Sabadell	1–1	Alcorcón	Sabadell
19:00 CET (UTC+1)	Cornud (yellow card) 45+1'; Cuevas (yellow card) 70'; Ibiza (yellow card) 83', (goal) 90+3'; Querol (yellow card) 90+3'	Report	José León (yellow card) 16'; Barbero (yellow card) 28'; Fraile 76' (pen.)	Stadium: Estadi de la Nova Creu Alta; Attendance: 0 Referee: Gorka Sagues Oscoz

13 December 2020 18	Las Palmas	0–0	Alcorcón	Las Palmas
18:15 CET (UTC+1)	Rodríguez (yellow card) 24'; Cedrés (yellow card) 28'; Castellano (yellow card) 75'	Report	José Carlos (yellow card) 42'	Stadium: Estadio Gran Canaria; Attendance: 0 Referee: Rubén Ávalos Barrera

20 December 2020 19	Alcorcón	2–1	Cartagena	Alcorcón
14:00 CET (UTC+1)	Escobar (yellow card) 13'; Fernández (yellow card) 34'; Gual 40'; José León 45+1'; Gómez (yellow card) 88'	Report	De la Bella (yellow card) 21'; Delmás (yellow card) 56'; Clavería (yellow card) 80'; Carrasquilla (yellow card) 86'; Zorrilla 90+3'	Stadium: Santo Domingo; Attendance: 0 Referee: Aitor Gorostegui Fernández Ortega

2 January 2021 20	Rayo Vallecano	2–1	Alcorcón	Madrid
16:00 CET (UTC+1)	Antoñín 16'; Trejo (yellow card) 20'; Advíncula (yellow card) 53'; Velázquez (yellow card) 85'; Fernández 86' (o.g.)	Report	Sosa (yellow card) 49'; Barbero 79'	Stadium: Campo de Fútbol de Vallecas; Attendance: 0 Referee: Francisco José Hernández Maeso

22 January 2021 22	Fuenlabrada	0–0	Alcorcón	Fuenlabrada
19:00 CET (UTC+1)	Antonio Cristian (yellow card) 3'; Salvador (yellow card) 60'; Diéguez (yellow card) 76'; Iribas (yellow card) 80'	Report	Gómez (yellow card) 20'; García (yellow card) 60'; Aguilera (yellow card) 70'	Stadium: Fernando Torres; Attendance: 0 Referee: Daniel Jesús Trujillo Suárez

26 January 2021 21	Alcorcón	1–2	Albacete	Alcorcón
19:00 CET (UTC+1)	Fraile 42'; José Carlos (yellow card) 45'; Gómez (yellow card) 52'; José León (yellow card) 68'	Report	Israfilov 30'; Sepp Mvondo (yellow card) 59'; Jiménez 69' (pen.); Boyomo (yellow card) 78'	Stadium: Santo Domingo; Attendance: 0 Referee: Juan Luis Pulido Santana

30 January 2021 23	Alcorcón	0–1	Málaga	Alcorcón
18:15 CET (UTC+1)	García (yellow card) 51'; José Carlos (yellow card) 83'	Report	Enríquez (yellow card) 15'; Escassi (yellow card) 45'; Chavarría 90+2'	Stadium: Santo Domingo; Attendance: 0 Referee: Saúl Ais Reig

8 February 2021 24	Ponferradina	2–0	Alcorcón	Ponferrada
19:00 CET (UTC+1)	Yuri 16', 56' (pen.); Adot (yellow card) 83'; Castellano (yellow card) 89'	Report	Fraile (yellow card) 34'; García (yellow card) 59'	Stadium: El Toralín; Attendance: 0 Referee: Daniel Ocón Arráiz

14 February 2021 25	Alcorcón	1–0	UD Logroñés	Alcorcón
18:15 CET (UTC+1)	Gual 20' (pen.); Escobar (yellow card) 31'; Nwakali (yellow card) 60'; Fraile (yellow card) 83'	Report	Bobadilla (yellow card) 10'; Paulino (yellow card) 65'; Acevedo (yellow card) 74'; Clemente (yellow card) 89'	Stadium: Santo Domingo; Attendance: 0 Referee: Rafael Sánchez López

22 February 2021 26	Zaragoza	0–1	Alcorcón	Zaragoza
21:00 CET (UTC+1)	Chavarría (yellow card) 88'	Report	Álvarez 65' (o.g.)	Stadium: La Romareda; Attendance: 0 Referee: Javier Iglesias Villanueva

28 February 2021 27	Tenerife	3–1	Alcorcón	Santa Cruz de Tenerife
18:15 CET (UTC+1)	Apeh (yellow card) 5'; Sol 77'; Shashoua 82'; González (yellow card) 89' (yellow-red card) 90+4'; Valera 90+5'	Report	Bellvís (yellow card) 8'; Laure (yellow card) 83'; Aguilera (yellow card) 83'; José León 90+1'	Stadium: Estadio Heliodoro Rodríguez López; Attendance: 0 Referee: Aitor Gorostegui Fernández Ortega

8 March 2021 28	Alcorcón	4–0	Mirandés	Alcorcón
19:00 CET (UTC+1)	Xisco 46', 76'; Bellvís 61'; Óscar 80'; García (yellow card) 90+4'	Report	Berrocal (yellow card) 36'; Javi Muñoz (yellow card) 71'; Barco (yellow card) 90+2'	Stadium: Santo Domingo; Attendance: 0 Referee: Gorka Sagues Oscoz

15 March 2021 29	Almería	0–0	Alcorcón	Almería
19:00 CET (UTC+1)	Balliu (yellow card) 56'; Villar (yellow card) 90'; Sadiq (yellow card) 90+1'	Report	José León (yellow card) 77'; Castro (yellow card) 90+1'	Stadium: Estadio de los Juegos Mediterráneos; Attendance: 0 Referee: Oliver De La Fuente

21 March 2021 30	Alcorcón	0–3	Rayo Vallecano	Alcorcón
20:30 CET (UTC+1)	Escobar (yellow card) 43'	Report	Suárez 13'; Qasmi 40'; García (yellow card) 70'; Saveljich (yellow card) 75'; Valentín (yellow card) 81'; Isi 90+5'; Trejo (yellow card) 90+6'	Stadium: Santo Domingo; Attendance: 0 Referee: Dámaso Arcediano Monescillo

26 March 2021 31	Sporting Gijón	0–0	Alcorcón	Gijón
19:00 CET (UTC+1)		Report		Stadium: El Molinón; Attendance: 0 Referee: Saúl Ais Reig

30 March 2021 32	Alcorcón	1–1	Oviedo	Alcorcón
19:00 CEST (UTC+2)	Nwakali 2'	Report	Blanco 84'	Stadium: Santo Domingo; Attendance: 0 Referee: Daniel Ocón Arráiz

5 April 2021 33	Cartagena	2–1	Alcorcón	Cartagena
18:00 CEST (UTC+2)	Andújar 5'; Cristian 34'	Report	Arribas 49'	Stadium: Cartagonova; Attendance: 0 Referee: Luis Mario Milla Alvendiz

12 April 2021 34	Alcorcón	2–1	Castellón	Alcorcón
19:00 CEST (UTC+2)	Xisco 4'; Nwakali 73'	Report	Lapeña 22'	Stadium: Santo Domingo; Attendance: 0 Referee: Eduardo Prieto Iglesias

17 April 2021 35	Lugo	1–3	Alcorcón	Lugo
14:00 CEST (UTC+2)	Herrera 49'	Report	Ojeda 21', 72'; Nwakali 81' (pen.)	Stadium: Anxo Carro; Attendance: 0 Referee: Iñaki Vicandi Garrido

25 April 2021 36	Alcorcón	1–2	Leganés	Alcorcón
18:15 CEST (UTC+2)	Nwakali 9' (pen.)	Report	Shibasaki 44'; Arnaiz 60'	Stadium: Santo Domingo; Attendance: 0 Referee: Rubén Ávalos Barrera

3 May 2021 37	Albacete	0–1	Alcorcón	Albacete
21:00 CEST (UTC+2)	Peña (yellow card) 53'; Israfilov (yellow card) 68'; García (yellow card) 82'; Isaac (red card) 90'; Fuster (red card) 90+5'	Report	Xisco 3'; Gómez (yellow card) 82'	Stadium: Carlos Belmonte; Attendance: 0 Referee: Jon Ander González Esteban

8 May 2021 38	Alcorcón	0–0	Las Palmas	Alcorcón
18:30 CEST (UTC+2)		Report		Stadium: Santo Domingo; Attendance: 0 Referee: Javier Iglesias Villanueva

16 May 2021 39	Mallorca	2–0	Alcorcón	Palma
21:30 CEST (UTC+2)	Rodríguez (yellow card) 36'; Abdón 43' (pen.), (yellow card) 46'; Sedlar (yellow card) 50'; Sevilla 54'	Report	Nwakali (yellow card) 17'; León (yellow card) 27'; Aguilera (yellow card) 43'	Stadium: Visit Mallorca Stadium; Attendance: 0 Referee: Dámaso Arcediano Monescillo

19 May 2021 40	Alcorcón	2–0	Sabadell	Alcorcón
19:00 CEST (UTC+2)	Ozkoidi 33' (o.g.); Xisco 47'	Report		Stadium: Santo Domingo; Attendance: 0 Referee: Eduardo Prieto Iglesias

24 May 2021 41	Girona	1–0	Alcorcón	Girona
21:00 CEST (UTC+2)	Sáiz (yellow card) 76'; Moreno (yellow card) 83'; Monchu 87'	Report	Gual (yellow card) 45+1'; Bravo (yellow card) 90+2'	Stadium: Montilivi; Attendance: 0 Referee: Gorka Sagués Oscoz

30 May 2021 42	Alcorcón	1–0	Espanyol	Alcorcón
21:00 CEST (UTC+2)	Fraile 33'	Report	Melamed (yellow card) 50'	Stadium: Santo Domingo; Attendance: 0 Referee: Iosu Galech Apezteguía

=== Copa del Rey ===
16 December 2020 First round	Lealtad	1–2	Alcorcón	Villaviciosa
15:30 CET (UTC+1)	Blanco 89'	Report	Reko 3'; Sosa 60'	Stadium: Les Caleyes; Referee: Alejandro Muñiz Ruiz

5 January 2021 Second round	Alcorcón	2–1	Zaragoza	Alcorcón
21:00 CET (UTC+1)	Bellvís (yellow card) 15'; Ernesto 42'; León 89'	Report	Raí 4'; Tarroc (yellow card) 88'	Stadium: Santo Domingo; Referee: Rubén Ávalos Barrera

17 January 2021 Round of 32	Alcorcón	0–2	Valencia	Las Rozas (Note: Given the impossibility of being able to play the match at the Santo Domingo stadium in Alcorcón due to the consequences of the “Filomena” storm.)
18:00 CET (UTC+1)	Reko (yellow card) 35'; Bravo (yellow card) 43'; Sosa (yellow card) 46'	Report	Guillamón (yellow card) 2'; Koindredi 12'; Correia (yellow card) 46'; Vallejo 77'	Stadium: La Ciudad del Fútbol; Referee: Xavier Estrada Fernández
