= 2021–22 AD Alcorcón season =

AD Alcorcón
2021–22 season
- Owner: David Blitzer
- President: Iván Bravo
- Head coach: Juan Antonio Anquela (until 18 September); Jorge Romero (from 18 September until 2 November); Fran Fernández (from 2 November)
- Stadium: Santo Domingo
- Segunda División: 22nd (relegated)
- Copa del Rey: Second round
Home colours	Away colours

The 2021–22 season was the 51st season in the existence of AD Alcorcón and the club's 12th consecutive season in the second division of Spanish football. In addition to the domestic league, Alcorcón participated in this season's edition of the Copa del Rey.

== Players ==
=== First-team squad ===
As of 2 February 2022

Note: Flags indicate national team as defined under FIFA eligibility rules; some limited exceptions apply. Players may hold more than one non-FIFA nationality.

No.	Pos.	Nation	Player
2	DF	ESP	Laure (captain)
3	DF	ESP	José Carlos
5	MF	ESP	Roberto Olabe
6	MF	ESP	Juanma Bravo
7	MF	ESP	Álex Mula (on loan from Fuenlabrada)
8	MF	ESP	Ander Gorostidi
9	MF	ECU	Joel Valencia (on loan from Brentford)
10	MF	ESP	Hugo Fraile
11	FW	NGR	Manu Apeh (on loan from Tenerife)
12	MF	URU	Gio Zarfino
13	GK	ESP	Cristian Rivero (on loan from Valencia)
14	DF	ARG	Nicolás Gorosito
15	DF	ESP	Carlos Hernández

No.	Pos.	Nation	Player
16	DF	ESP	Carlos Bellvís
17	DF	VEN	Víctor García
18	FW	ESP	Xisco
19	DF	ESP	David Fernández
20	DF	ESP	Iván Calero (on loan from Málaga)
21	DF	ESP	Luis Valcarce
22	FW	ESP	Óscar Arribas
23	DF	ESP	David Forniés
24	FW	ESP	Borja Valle
25	MF	ESP	José Ángel
26	MF	ESP	Antonio Moyano
31	GK	ESP	Chus Ruiz
35	DF	ESP	Óscar Rivas

=== Reserve team ===
Note: Flags indicate national team as defined under FIFA eligibility rules; some limited exceptions apply. Players may hold more than one non-FIFA nationality.

No.	Pos.	Nation	Player
27	DF	ESP	Iker Bachiller
28	DF	ARG	Emi Hernández
29	FW	ESP	Luis Molina
30	MF	ESP	Rafa Diz
32	DF	ESP	Álvaro Yuste

No.	Pos.	Nation	Player
33	GK	ESP	Jagoba Zárraga
34	MF	ESP	Isra García
36	FW	ESP	Yago Paredes
—	FW	ESP	Abdoulaye Keita

=== Out on loan ===
Note: Flags indicate national team as defined under FIFA eligibility rules; some limited exceptions apply. Players may hold more than one non-FIFA nationality.

No.	Pos.	Nation	Player
—	DF	ESP	Barbu (at Real Unión until 30 June 2022)
—	DF	ESP	Edu Viaña (at Atlético Mancha Real until 30 June 2022)
—	DF	PAN	Fidel Escobar (at Cultural Leonesa until 30 June 2022)
—	DF	ESP	Javier Castro (at Celta B until 30 June 2022)
—	MF	MAR	Abdel Al Badaoui (at Waasland-Beveren until 30 June 2022)
—	MF	ESP	Aitor González (at Tudelano until 30 June 2022)

No.	Pos.	Nation	Player
—	MF	ESP	Miki Muñoz (at Navalcarnero until 30 June 2022)
—	MF	ESP	Pipo (at Cornellà until 30 June 2022)
—	FW	ESP	Ale Llamas (at Antequera until 30 June 2022)
—	FW	ESP	Álvaro Juan (at Cultural Leonesa until 30 June 2022)
—	FW	ESP	Iván Cédric (at Toledo until 30 June 2022)
—	FW	ESP	Gabri López (at Izarra until 30 June 2022)

== Pre-season and friendlies ==
Win Draw Loss

28 July 2021 Friendly	Granada	0–1	Alcorcón	Marbella, Spain
19:00 CEST (UTC+2)			Arribas 3'	Stadium: Marbella Football Center

31 July 2021 Friendly	Málaga	0–3	Alcorcón	Benahavís, Spain
10:00 CEST (UTC+2)				Stadium: Campo La Quinta

6 August 2021 Friendly	Alcorcón	2–1	Ibiza	Alcorcón, Spain
18:45 CEST (UTC+2)				Stadium: Santo Domingo

7 August 2021 Friendly	Leganés	2–0	Alcorcón	Leganés, Spain
10:00 CEST (UTC+2)				Stadium: Instalación Deportiva Butarque

== Competitions ==
=== Overall record ===
Competition	First match	Last match	Starting round	Final position	Record							
Competition	First match	Last match	Starting round	Final position	Pld	W	D	L	GF	GA	GD	Win %
Segunda División	14 August 2021	29 May 2022	Matchday 1	22nd	42	6	11	25	37	71	−34	14.29
Copa del Rey	30 November 2021	15 December 2021	First round	Second round	2	1	0	1	2	2	+0	50.00
Total					44	7	11	26	39	73	−34	15.91

Source: Soccerway

=== Segunda División ===
==== League table ====
Pos	Team	Pld	W	D	L	GF	GA	GD	Pts	Qualification or relegation
18	Málaga	42	11	12	19	36	57	−21	45	
19	Amorebieta (R)	42	9	16	17	44	63	−19	43	Relegation to Primera Federación
20	Real Sociedad B (R)	42	10	10	22	43	61	−18	40	Relegation to Primera Federación
21	Fuenlabrada (R)	42	6	15	21	39	65	−26	33	Relegation to Primera Federación
22	Alcorcón (R)	42	6	11	25	37	71	−34	29	Relegation to Primera Federación

Source: LaLiga SmartBank
Rules for classification: 1) points; 2) head-to-head points; 3) head-to-head goal difference; 4) goal difference; 5) number of goals scored
(R) Relegated

==== Results summary ====
Overall								Home						Away					
Pld	W	D	L	GF	GA	GD	Pts	W	D	L	GF	GA	GD	W	D	L	GF	GA	GD
42	6	11	25	37	71	−34	29	3	7	11	17	34	−17	3	4	14	20	37	−17

Source: La Liga SmartBank

==== Results by round ====
Round	1	2	3	4	5	6	7	8	9	10	11	12	13	14	15	16	17	18	19	20	21	22	23	24	25	26	27	28	29	30	31	32	33	34	35	36	37	38	39	40	41	42
Ground	A	H	A	H	A	H	A	H	H	A	H	A	H	A	H	A	A	H	A	H	A	H	A	H	A	A	H	A	H	A	H	A	H	A	H	A	H	H	A	H	A	H
Result	L	L	L	L	W	L	L	L	W	L	D	L	L	L	D	L	L	D	L	D	D	L	L	D	L	L	L	D	D	L	W	D	L	W	D	L	L	L	W	L	D	W
Position	18	20	22	22	21	22	22	22	22	22	22	22	22	22	22	22	22	22	22	22	22	22	22	22	22	22	22	22	22	22	22	22	22	22	22	22	22	22	22	22	22	22

Source: La Liga SmartBank
A = Away; H = Home; W = Win; D = Draw; L = Loss

==== Matches ====
The league fixtures were announced on 30 June 2021.

14 August 2021 1	Ponferradina	1–0	Alcorcón	Ponferrada
22:00 CEST (UTC+2)	Yuri 50' (pen.)	Report		Stadium: El Toralín; Referee: Javier Iglesias Villanueva

21 August 2021 2	Alcorcón	0–2	Fuenlabrada	Alcorcón
22:00 CEST (UTC+2)		Report	Kanté 67'; Anderson 83'	Stadium: Santo Domingo; Attendance: 1,044; Referee: Jon Ander González Esteban

27 August 2021 3	Málaga	1–0	Alcorcón	Málaga
22:00 CEST (UTC+2)	Escassi 35', (yellow card) 77' (yellow-red card) 90+6'	Report		Stadium: La Rosaleda; Attendance: 6,884; Referee: Aitor Gorostegui Fernández-Ortega

5 September 2021 4	Alcorcón	1–2	Zaragoza	Alcorcón
18:15 CEST (UTC+2)	Moyano 20'	Report	Eguaras 56'; Vada 84'	Stadium: Santo Domingo; Referee: Rubén Ávalos Barrera

11 September 2021 5	Mirandés	1–3	Alcorcón	Miranda de Ebro
21:00 CEST (UTC+2)	Camello 20'	Report	Zarfino 29'; Asencio 62'; Xisco 90+1'	Stadium: Estadio Municipal de Anduva; Referee: Gorka Sagués Oscoz

17 September 2021 6	Alcorcón	0–4	Almería	Alcorcón
21:00 CEST (UTC+2)	Raúl Asencio (yellow card) 29'; Carlos Hernández (yellow card) 60'; Antonio Moyano (yellow card) 86'; Juan Hernández (yellow card) 90+2'	Report	Sadiq 5' 16'; Ramazani (yellow card) 36'; Dani Jiménez 37' (o.g.); Alejandro Pozo 69'; Samú Costa (yellow card) 78'	Stadium: Santo Domingo; Attendance: 1,559; Referee: Raúl Martín González Francés

26 September 2021 7	Valladolid	2–0	Alcorcón	Valladolid
21:00 CEST (UTC+2)	Sergio León (yellow card) 2'; Álvaro Aguado 19'; Roque Mesa (yellow card) 80'; Weissman 89'	Report	Gorosito (yellow card) 69'	Stadium: José Zorrilla; Attendance: 12,395; Referee: (Spain) Saúl Ais Reig

2 October 2021 8	Alcorcón	1–4	Real Sociedad B	Alcorcón
21:00 CET (UTC+1)	Gorosito 34' (yellow card) 45'; Raúl Asencio (yellow card) 41'; Laure (yellow card) 44'; Ander Gorostidi (yellow card) 48'; Antonio Moyano (yellow card) 60'	Report	Olasagasti 3'; Jon Karrikaburu 45+2' (pen.); Xeber Alkain 52' 62'	Stadium: Santo Domingo; Attendance: 1,357; Referee: (Spain) Rafael Sánchez López

10 October 2021 9	Alcorcón	1–0	Burgos	Alcorcón
18:15 CET (UTC+1)	Lucho Vega (yellow card) 25'; David Fernández 90+1'	Report	Miki Muñoz (yellow card) 16'; Míchel Zabaco (yellow card) 31'; Andy (yellow card) 35'	Stadium: Santo Domingo; Attendance: 1,953; Referee: (Spain) Iosu Galech Apezteguía

16 October 2021 10	Sporting Gijón	1–0	Alcorcón	Gijón
21:00 CET (UTC+1)	Đurđević (yellow card) 18' (goal) 90+1'; Kravets (yellow card) 27'	Report	García (yellow card) 20'; Gorosito (yellow card) 29'; Antonio Moyano (yellow card) 32'; Marc Gual (red card) 90+4'; David Forniés (yellow card) 90+5'	Stadium: El Molinón; Attendance: 14,146; Referee: (Spain) Oliver De la Fuente Ramos

20 October 2021 11	Alcorcón	3–3	Leganés	Alcorcón
21:00 CET (UTC+1)	Juan Hernández 6' (pen.); Juanma Bravo 39' (yellow card) 72'; Lucho Vega (yellow card) 43'; García (yellow card) 54'; David Forniés (yellow card) 59'; Hugo Fraile 77'	Report	Bárcenas 23'; Javi Hernández 42'; Bruno (yellow card) 46'; José Arnaiz 64'; Sergi Palencia (yellow card) 69'	Stadium: Santo Domingo; Attendance: 1,700; Referee: (Spain) Dámaso Arcediano Monescillo

24 October 2021 12	Las Palmas	3–0	Alcorcón	Las Palmas de Gran Canaria
21:00 CET (UTC+1)	Loiodice 23'; Benito Ramírez 58'; Eric Curbelo 72'	Report	Asier Córdoba (red card) 8'; Carlos Hernández (yellow card) 61'	Stadium: Estadio Gran Canaria; Attendance: 8,936; Referee: (Spain) Iván Caparrós Hernández

1 November 2021 13	Alcorcón	0–2	Ibiza	Alcorcón
16:00 CET (UTC+1)	Juan Aguilera (yellow card) 79'; Raúl Asencio (yellow card) 86'	Report	Sergio Castel 61'; Rubén González 68'; Nono (yellow card) 90+3'	Stadium: Santo Domingo; Attendance: 1,522; Referee: (Spain) Víctor García Verdura

4 November 2021 14	Girona	3–1	Alcorcón	Girona
19:00 CET (UTC+1)	Stuani 54' 62' 65' (yellow card) 89'	Report	Gorosito 30'; Juan Aguilera (yellow card) 50'; Hugo Fraile (yellow card) 89'; Lucho Vega (yellow card) 90+4'	Stadium: Estadi Municipal de Montilivi; Attendance: 4,419; Referee: (Spain) Rafael Sánchez López

7 November 2021 15	Alcorcón	2–2	Amorebieta	Alcorcón
14:00 CET (UTC+1)	Juan Hernández 56'; Lucho Vega (yellow card) 65'; Marc Gual 90+4'	Report	Gaizka Larrazabal 29'; Iker Bilbao (yellow card) 63'; Aitor Aldalur (yellow card) 74'; Álvaro Peña 90+1'	Stadium: Santo Domingo; Attendance: 1,147; Referee: (Spain) Saúl Ais Reig

13 November 2021 16	Eibar	2–1	Alcorcón	Eibar
18:15 CET (UTC+1)	Stoichkov 12'; Edu Expósito 20'; Etxeita (yellow card) 57'	Report	Zarfino 42'; Lucho Vega (yellow card) 44'; Laure (yellow card) 45+2'; Carlos Bellvís (yellow card) 45+3'	Stadium: Ipurua Municipal Stadium; Attendance: 4,613; Referee: (Spain) Oliver De La Fuente

26 November 2021 18	Alcorcón	1–1	Lugo	Alcorcón
CET (UTC+1)				Stadium: Santo Domingo

12 December 2021 20	Alcorcón	1–1	Cartagena	Alcorcón
CET (UTC+1)				Stadium: Santo Domingo

3 January 2022 22	Alcorcón	0–1	Málaga	Alcorcón
CET (UTC+1)				Stadium: Santo Domingo

23 January 2022 24	Alcorcón	0–0	Mirandés	Alcorcón
CET (UTC+1)				Stadium: Santo Domingo

13 February 2022 27	Alcorcón	0–2	Tenerife	Alcorcón
CET (UTC+1)				Stadium: Santo Domingo

27 February 2022 29	Alcorcón	2–2	Ponferradina	Alcorcón
CET (UTC+1)				Stadium: Santo Domingo

13 March 2022 31	Alcorcón	1–0	Huesca	Alcorcón
CET (UTC+1)				Stadium: Santo Domingo

27 March 2022 33	Alcorcón	1–2	Valladolid	Alcorcón
CET (UTC+1)				Stadium: Santo Domingo

9 April 2022 35	Alcorcón	1–1	Sporting Gijón	Alcorcón
CEST (UTC+2)				Stadium: Santo Domingo

1 May 2022 38	Alcorcón	0–1	Girona	Alcorcón
CEST (UTC+2)				Stadium: Santo Domingo

15 May 2022 40	Alcorcón	0–2	Las Palmas	Alcorcón
CEST (UTC+2)				Stadium: Santo Domingo

21 May 2022 41	Almería	1–1	Alcorcón	Almería
22:00 CET	Ramazani (yellow card) 10'; Samú Costa (yellow card) 45+4'; César de la Hoz (yellow card) 90'; Arnau Puigmal 90+3'	Report	José Carlos (yellow card) 45+2'; Iván Calero (yellow card) 45+4'; Chus Ruiz (yellow card) 77'; Zarfino 81' (yellow card) 82'	Stadium: Estadio de los Juegos Mediterráneos; Attendance: 14,759; Referee: (Spain) Raúl González Francés

29 May 2022 42	Alcorcón	1–0	Eibar	Alcorcón
CEST (UTC+2)				Stadium: Santo Domingo

=== Copa del Rey ===
30 November 2021 First Round	Teruel	0 - 1	Alcorcón	Teruel
20:00 CET	Fabio Conte (yellow card) 28'	Report	Luis Molina García (yellow card) 23'; Hugo Fraile 28' (pen.)	Stadium: Estadio Pinilla; Attendance: 1,700; Referee: (Spain) Rubén Ávalos

15 December 2021 Second Round	Sporting Gijón	2 - 1 (a.e.t.)	Alcorcón	Gijón
20:00 CET	Nacho Méndez 42' (yellow card) 120'; Đurđević (yellow card) 63' (goal) 99'; Borja López (yellow card) 90+1'; Gaspar Campos (yellow card) 95'	Report	Hugo Fraile (yellow card) 44'; Al Badaoui 57'; Escobar (yellow card) 66'; Óscar Rivas (yellow card) 92'; David Forniés (yellow card) 101'; Lucho Vega (yellow card) 105'; Juan Aguilera (yellow card) 116'	Stadium: El Molinón; Attendance: 7,500; Referee: (Spain) Jon González
