= 2023–24 AD Alcorcón season =

AD Alcorcón
2023–24 season
- President: Iván Bravo
- Head coach: Fran Fernández (until 4 December); Mehdi Nafti (from 5 December)
- Stadium: Santo Domingo
- Segunda División: 20th
- Copa del Rey: Second round
- All statistics correct as of 21 December 2023.

The 2023–24 season is AD Alcorcón's 53rd season in existence and first one back in the Segunda División, the second division of association football in Spain. They will also compete in the Copa del Rey.

== Players ==
=== First-team squad ===
As of 15 January 2024.

Note: Flags indicate national team as defined under FIFA eligibility rules; some limited exceptions apply. Players may hold more than one non-FIFA nationality.

No.	Pos.	Nation	Player
1	GK	ESP	Jesús Ruiz
2	DF	ESP	Javier Castro
3	DF	ESP	David Morillas
4	DF	ESP	Óscar Rivas
5	MF	ESP	Pedro Mosquera
6	DF	MTQ	Jean-Sylvain Babin (captain)
8	MF	ESP	Jacobo González
9	FW	ESP	Christian Borrego
10	MF	ESP	Juanma Bravo
11	FW	POR	Dyego Sousa
13	GK	BRA	Lucas Anacker
14	MF	ESP	Fede Vico

No.	Pos.	Nation	Player
15	MF	ESP	Javi Lara
16	MF	ESP	Javi Pérez
17	MF	ESP	Víctor García
18	MF	CMR	Yan Eteki
19	DF	ESP	Xavi Quintillà
20	DF	ESP	Iago López
21	FW	ESP	Koldo Obieta
22	FW	ESP	Juan Artola (on loan from Athletic Bilbao)
23	DF	ESP	Chema Rodríguez
24	MF	ESP	Iker Bilbao
26	FW	GHA	Emmanuel Addai
33	FW	GBS	Marciano Sanca (on loan from Almería)

=== Reserve team ===
Note: Flags indicate national team as defined under FIFA eligibility rules; some limited exceptions apply. Players may hold more than one non-FIFA nationality.

No.	Pos.	Nation	Player
27	FW	ESP	Eric Gómez
28	MF	ESP	Jaime Garrido
29	DF	ESP	Èric Callís
30	MF	ESP	Íñigo García
32	DF	ESP	Héctor Criado

No.	Pos.	Nation	Player
33	MF	ESP	Edu Llorente
34	MF	ESP	Isra García
35	DF	ESP	Fernando Romero
38	DF	ESP	Bryan Osorio

=== Out on loan ===
Note: Flags indicate national team as defined under FIFA eligibility rules; some limited exceptions apply. Players may hold more than one non-FIFA nationality.

No.	Pos.	Nation	Player
—	DF	ESP	Álvaro Yuste (at Melilla until 30 June 2024)
—	DF	ESP	Iker Recio (at Gimnàstic until 30 June 2024)
—	MF	ESP	Chus Ruiz (at Formentera until 30 June 2024)

No.	Pos.	Nation	Player
—	MF	ESP	Dani Cervera (at Terrassa until 30 June 2024)
—	FW	ESP	Yago Paredes (at Valladolid Promesas until 30 June 2024)

== Transfers ==
=== In ===
Pos.	Player	Transferred from	Fee	Date	Source
GK	(Brazil) Lucas Anacker	(Spain) UE Cornellà	Free	3 August 2023	
MF	(Cameroon) Yan Eteki	(Portugal) Casa Pia	Free	8 August 2023	
DF	(Spain) Xavi Quintillà	(Portugal) Santa Clara	Free	11 August 2023	
DF	(Spain) Chema	(Spain) Eibar	Free	12 August 2023	
FW	(Portugal) Dyego Sousa	(Spain) Almería	Free	17 August 2023	
MF	(Spain) Javi Pérez	Unattached	Free	18 November 2023	

=== Out ===
Pos.	Player	Transferred to	Fee	Date	Source
MF	(Spain) Javi Ribelles	Released		1 July 2023	
MF	(Spain) Ernesto Gómez	Released		1 July 2023	
MF	(Spain) Berto	Released		1 July 2023	
MF	(Spain) Antonio Moyano	Released		1 July 2023	
DF	(Spain) Javi Jiménez	Released		1 July 2023	
DF	(Spain) Iker Recio	(Spain) Gimnàstic de Tarragona	Loan	21 August 2023	
DF	(Spain) Álvaro Yuste	(Spain) UD Melilla	Loan	31 August 2023	

== Pre-season and friendlies ==
Win Draw Loss Fixtures

2 August 2023 Friendly	Elche	0–0	Alcorcón	San Pedro del Pinatar
20:00 UTC+2				Stadium: Pinatar Arena Football Center

5 August 2023 Friendly	Albacete	0–1	Alcorcón	Albacete
19:30 UTC+2				Stadium: Estadio Carlos Belmonte

7 September 2023 Trofeo Puchero-Siena	Alcorcón	2–2 (1–4 p)	Rayo Vallecano	Alcorcón
20:30 UTC+2	Bustos 37'; Borrego 84'		De Frutos 9'; Pozo 35'	Stadium: Santo Domingo

5 January 2024 Friendly	Alcorcón	0–0	Leganés	Alcorcón
11:30 UTC+1				Stadium: Santo Domingo; Attendance: 100; Referee: Rodríguez Recio

== Competitions ==
=== Overall record ===
Competition	First match	Last match	Starting round	Final position	Record							
Competition	First match	Last match	Starting round	Final position	Pld	W	D	L	GF	GA	GD	Win %
Segunda División	14 August 2023	2 June 2024	Matchday 1		27	7	7	13	21	37	−16	25.93
Copa del Rey	1 November 2023	6 December 2023	First round	Second round	2	1	1	0	1	0	+1	50.00
Total					29	8	8	13	22	37	−15	27.59

Last updated: 18 February 2024
Source: Soccerway

=== Segunda División ===
==== League table ====
Pos	Team	Pld	W	D	L	GF	GA	GD	Pts	Qualification or relegation
18	Mirandés	42	12	13	17	47	55	−8	49 (Note: Huesca finished ahead of Mirandés on head-to-head points: Huesca 1–1 Mirandés, Mirandés 0–3 Huesca)	
19	Amorebieta (R)	42	11	12	19	37	53	−16	45	Relegation to Primera Federación
20	Alcorcón (R)	42	10	14	18	32	53	−21	44	Relegation to Primera Federación
21	Andorra (R)	42	11	10	21	33	53	−20	43 (Note: Andorra finished ahead of Villarreal B on overall goal difference)	Relegation to Primera Federación
22	Villarreal B (R)	42	11	10	21	41	62	−21	43	Relegation to Primera Federación

Updated to match(es) played on 2 Jun 2024. Source: LaLiga HyperMotion
Rules for classification: 1) Points; 2) Head-to-head points; 3) Head-to-head goal difference; 4) Goal difference; 5) Goals scored; 6) Fair-play points
(Note: Head-to-head record is used only after all the matches between the teams in question have been played)
(R) Relegated

==== Results summary ====
Overall								Home						Away					
Pld	W	D	L	GF	GA	GD	Pts	W	D	L	GF	GA	GD	W	D	L	GF	GA	GD
42	10	14	18	32	53	−21	44	5	11	5	15	18	−3	5	3	13	17	35	−18

Source: LaLiga.com

==== Results by round ====
Round	1	2	3	4	5	6	7	8	9	10	11	12	13	14	15	16	17	18	19	20	21	22	23	24	25	26	27	28
Ground	A	H	A	H	A	H	H	A	H	A	A	H	A	H	A	H	A	H	A	H	A	H	A	H	A	H	A	H
Result	L	L	W	D	D	L	L	D	L	W	L	D	L	W	L	D	L	L	L	W	W	D	W	D	L	W	L	
Position	22	22	18	16	16	19	20	21	21	20	20	20	20	19	20	21	21	21	22	20	20	20	18	18	20	19	20	

Updated to match(es) played on 18 February 2024. Source: LaLiga.com
A = Away; H = Home; W = Win; D = Draw; L = Loss

==== Matches ====
The league fixtures were unveiled on 28 June 2023.

14 August 2023 1	Mirandés	4–0	Alcorcón	Miranda de Ebro
19:00 CEST (UTC+2)	Barcia 16' (pen.); Carlos Martín 37', 73'; Martínez 59'; Ramón (yellow card) 90+2'	Report	López (yellow card) 45+2'	Stadium: Estadio Municipal de Anduva; Attendance: 2,634; Referee: Miguel González Díaz

19 August 2023 2	Alcorcón	0–2	Leganés	Alcorcón
22:00 CEST (UTC+2)		Report	Undabarrena 49'; Raba 71'	Stadium: Santo Domingo; Attendance: 2,722; Referee: Luis Mario Milla Alvendiz

26 August 2023 3	Valladolid	0–2	Alcorcón	Valladolid
19:30 CEST (UTC+2)	Meseguer (yellow card) 49'	Report	Eteki (yellow card) 23'; González 35'; Obieta (yellow card) 38'; Artola (yellow card) 69'; Morillas (yellow card) 79'; Sousa 90+4'	Stadium: Estadio Municipal de Anduva; Attendance: 16,301; Referee: Andrés Fuentes Molina

1 September 2023 4	Alcorcón	1–1	Racing Ferrol	Alcorcón
19:30 CEST (UTC+2)	Obieta (yellow card) 50'; Eteki (yellow card) 67'; Chiki (penalty missed) 70'; Sousa (yellow card) 82', (goal) 90+4'	Report	Martínez (yellow card) 58'; Losada 90+1'	Stadium: Santo Domingo; Attendance: 3,508; Referee: Óliver de la Fuente Ramos

11 September 2023 5	Eldense	2–2	Alcorcón	Elda
21:00 CEST (UTC+2)	Chapela 52'; Hernández 73'	Report	Addai 66'; Chiki 90+6'	Stadium: Nuevo Pepico Amat; Attendance: 3,960; Referee: Germán Cid Camacho

16 September 2023 6	Alcorcón	0–2	Levante	Alcorcón
18:30 CEST (UTC+2)		Report	Rey 36'; Brugué 80'	Stadium: Santo Domingo; Attendance: 3,505; Referee: Iosu Galech Apezteguía

23 September 2023 7	Alcorcón	0–2	Huesca	Alcorcón
21:00 CEST (UTC+2)	Eteki (yellow card) 45+1'; Mosquera (yellow card) 67'	Report	Mier (yellow card) 7'; Loureiro 21'; Obeng 25'	Stadium: Santo Domingo; Referee: Iván Caparrós Hernández

5 November 2023 14	Alcorcón	3–1	Racing Santander	Alcorcón
18:30 CET (UTC+1)				Stadium: Santo Domingo

18 November 2023 16	Alcorcón	0–0	Sporting Gijón	Alcorcón
16:15 CET (UTC+1)				Stadium: Santo Domingo

26 November 2023 17	Espanyol	2–0	Alcorcón	Cornella de Llobregat
21:00 CET (UTC+1)	Milla 45+1'; Carreras 57'		García (yellow card) 61' (yellow-red card) 70'	Stadium: Stage Front Stadium; Referee: Rafael Sánchez López

3 December 2023 18	Alcorcón	0–2	Elche	Alcorcón
16:15 CET (UTC+1)	Quintillà (red card) 77'		Morente 17'; Plano 52' (pen.)	Stadium: Santo Domingo; Referee: Oliver de la Fuente Ramos

18 February 2024 27	Leganés	3–0	Alcorcón	Leganés
16:15 CET (UTC+1)	García 18'; Portillo 66'; Raba 81'			Stadium: Estadio Municipal de Butarque; Referee: Andrés Fuentes Molina

25 February 2024 28	Alcorcón	v	Tenerife	Alcorcón
16:15				Stadium: Estadio Municipal de Santo Domingo

26 May 2024 41	Levante	v	Alcorcón	Valencia
				Stadium: Estadi Ciutat de València

=== Copa del Rey ===
1 November 2023 First round	Navalcarnero	0–1	Alcorcón	Navalcarnero
12:00 CET (UTC+1)		Report	Lara 21'	Stadium: Estadio Municipal Mariano González; Referee: Luis Mario Milla Alvendiz

6 December 2023 Second round	Alcorcón	0–0 (4–5 p)	Cartagena	Alcorcón
12:00 CET (UTC+1)				Stadium: Santo Domingo
