= 2022–23 Jagiellonia Białystok season =

Jagiellonia Białystok
2022–23 season
- Manager: Maciej Stolarczyk (until 4 April 2023); Adrian Siemieniec (from 4 April 2023)
- Stadium: Stadion Miejski
- Ekstraklasa: 14th
- Polish Cup: Round of 32

The 2022–23 season was Jagiellonia Białystok's 103rd season in existence and the club's 16th consecutive season in the top flight of Polish football. In addition to the domestic league, Jagiellonia Białystok participated in this season's edition of the Polish Cup. The season covered the period from 1 July 2022 to 30 June 2023.

Ahead of the 2022–23 season, Maciej Stolarczyk was appointed as manager on a two-year contract. He was dismissed as manager on 4 April 2023, with Adrian Siemieniec appointed as manager until the end of the season.

== Players ==
=== First-team squad ===
As of 13 January 2023

Note: Flags indicate national team as defined under FIFA eligibility rules; some limited exceptions apply. Players may hold more than one non-FIFA nationality.

No.	Pos.	Nation	Player
1	GK	(Serbia) SRB	Zlatan Alomerović
2	DF	(Poland) POL	Michał Pazdan
4	DF	(Spain) ESP	Israel Puerto
5	DF	(Bosnia and Herzegovina) BIH	Bojan Nastić
6	MF	(Poland) POL	Taras Romanczuk (captain)
7	MF	(Spain) ESP	Juan Cámara
8	MF	(Portugal) POR	Nené
9	FW	(Poland) POL	Bartosz Bida
11	FW	(Spain) ESP	Jesús Imaz
14	MF	(Czech Republic) CZE	Tomáš Přikryl
17	DF	(Croatia) CRO	Ivan Runje
19	DF	(Poland) POL	Paweł Olszewski
20	DF	(Poland) POL	Kacper Tabiś
22	MF	(Poland) POL	Oliwier Wojciechowski
25	DF	(Romania) ROU	Bogdan Țîru
26	MF	(Czech Republic) CZE	Martin Pospíšil

No.	Pos.	Nation	Player
27	DF	(Poland) POL	Bartłomiej Wdowik
28	FW	(Spain) ESP	Marc Gual (on loan from SC Dnipro-1)
30	FW	(Poland) POL	Maciej Twarowski
33	GK	(Poland) POL	Bartłomiej Żynel
36	DF	(Poland) POL	Jakub Lewicki
40	DF	(Poland) POL	Patryk Czerech
41	DF	(Poland) POL	Michał Ozga
42	MF	(Poland) POL	Mikołaj Wasilewski
50	GK	(Poland) POL	Sławomir Abramowicz
51	MF	(Poland) POL	Bartosz Bernatowicz
60	FW	(Poland) POL	Mateusz Kowalski
66	GK	(Poland) POL	Miłosz Piekutowski
72	DF	(Poland) POL	Mateusz Skrzypczak
74	FW	(Poland) POL	Andrzej Trubeha
77	MF	(Poland) POL	Wojciech Łaski
—	MF	(France) FRA	Aurélien Nguiamba (on loan from Spezia)

=== Out on loan ===
Note: Flags indicate national team as defined under FIFA eligibility rules; some limited exceptions apply. Players may hold more than one non-FIFA nationality.

No.	Pos.	Nation	Player
—	MF	(Poland) POL	Michał Surzyn (at Sandecja Nowy Sącz until 30 June 2023)

== Competitions ==
=== Ekstraklasa ===
==== League table ====
Pos	Team	Pld	W	D	L	GF	GA	GD	Pts	Qualification or relegation
12	Widzew Łódź	34	11	8	15	38	47	−9	41	
13	Korona Kielce	34	11	8	15	39	48	−9	41	
14	Jagiellonia Białystok	34	9	14	11	48	49	−1	41	
15	Śląsk Wrocław	34	9	11	14	35	48	−13	38	
16	Wisła Płock (R)	34	10	7	17	41	50	−9	37	Relegation to I liga

Source: ekstraklasa.org
Rules for classification: 1) Points; 2) Head-to-head points; 3) Head-to-head goal difference; 4) Goal difference; 5) Goals scored; 6) Number of wins; 7) Number of away wins; 8) Lower number of points based on yellow and red cards (red card = 3 points, yellow card = 1 point, sending-off = 3 points - including 1 point for first yellow card); 9) Fairplay ranking; 10) Draw. (Note: Head-to-head record is used only after all the matches between the teams in question have been played)
(R) Relegated

==== Matches ====
The league fixtures were announced on 1 June 2022.

Ekstraklasa match details
Date	Time	Opponent	Venue	Result F–A	Scorers	Attendance	Ref.
16 July 2022	17:30	Piast Gliwice	H	2–0	Imaz 29', Kowalski 90'	8,236	
22 July 2022	20:30	Widzew Łódź	H	0–2		11,781	
31 July 2022	15:00	Pogoń Szczecin	A	0–1		8,981	
6 August 2022	17:30	Radomiak Radom	H	1–2	Gual 12'	9,113	
14 August 2022	17:30	Raków Częstochowa	A	2–2	Nené 63', Imaz 85'	5,348	
19 August 2022	18:00	Miedź Legnica	H	2–1	Gual 69' pen., Nené 90'	8,407	
26 August 2022	18:00	Górnik Zabrze	A	1–1	Imaz 45'	12,649	
4 September 2022	12:30	Zagłębie Lubin	A	1–1	Bortniczuk 85'	4,951	
12 September 2022	19:00	Stal Mielec	H	4–0	Imaz 32', 65', Gual 37', 40'	6,519	
17 September 2022	15:00	Lechia Gdańsk	A	2–2	Gual 3', Imaz 55'	5,872	
2 October 2022	15:00	Korona Kielce	H	4–1	Přikryl 3', Gual 52' pen., Černych 62' pen., Imaz 85'	8,333	
7 October 2022	20:30	Wisła Płock	H	1–1	Imaz 65'	7,731	
15 October 2022	17:30	Warta Poznań	A	0–2		1,014	
23 October 2022	15:00	Śląsk Wrocław	A	2–2	Gual 24', Lewicki 66'	7,870	
29 October 2022	17:30	Legia Warszawa	H	2–5	Gual 16', Kowalski 77'	16,635	
5 November 2022	15:00	Cracovia	A	0–1		9,628	
12 November 2022	17:30	Lech Poznań	H	1–2	Skrzypczak 45'	10,167	
29 January 2023	12:30	Piast Gliwice	A	1–1	Łaski 61'	3,328	
3 February 2023	21:00 (Note: Kick-off was originally scheduled for 20:30 but delayed due to poor condition of pitch.)	Widzew Łódź	A	1–1	Kreuzriegler 90' o.g.	17,081	
11 February 2023	20:00	Pogoń Szczecin	H	2–0	Kupisz 58', Imaz 78'	5,450	
20 February 2023	19:00	Radomiak Radom	A	0–0		2,275	
24 February 2023	18:00	Raków Częstochowa	H	1–2	Imaz 3'	6,547	
5 March 2023	12:30	Miedź Legnica	A	1–1	Nené 24'	3,943	
11 March 2023	20:00	Górnik Zabrze	H	2–1	Nené 28', Gual 45'	5,673	
18 March 2023	15:00	Zagłębie Lubin	H	2–2	Gual 54', Pazdan 72'	6,658	
3 April 2023	19:00	Stal Mielec	A	1–1	Imaz 3'	3,542	
10 April 2023	15:00	Lechia Gdańsk	H	1–0	Romanczuk 84'	8,985	
15 April 2023	17:30	Korona Kielce	A	1–2	Imaz 36'	10,133	
21 April 2023	18:00	Wisła Płock	A	4–2	Gual 35', 46', 58', Imaz 70'	4,300	
29 April 2023	15:00	Warta Poznań	H	3–1	Gual 9', Szymonowicz 17' o.g., Nené 31'	8,481	
6 May 2023	18:00	Śląsk Wrocław	H	1–1	Gual 65' pen.	9,012	
12 May 2023	20:30	Legia Warszawa	A	1–5	Nawrocki 15' o.g.	22,137	
20 May 2023	15:00	Cracovia	H	1–1	Imaz 14'	16,251	
27 May 2023	17:30	Lech Poznań	A	0–2		39,123	

=== Polish Cup ===
Polish Cup match details
Round	Date	Time	Opponent	Venue	Result F–A	Scorers	Attendance	Ref.
First round	1 September 2022	18:00	Odra Opole	A	1–0 (a.e.t.)	Bortniczuk 96'	2,468	
Round of 32	12 October 2022	14:30	Lechia Zielona Góra	A	1–3	Wdowik 45'	999	
