= Diego Moreno =

Diego Moreno may refer to:

- Diego Moreno (baseball) (born 1987), Venezuelan baseball player
- Diego Moreno (footballer, born 1996), Colombian football midfielder
- Diego Moreno (footballer, born 2001), Spanish football defender

== See also ==
- Guito (born 1989), born Diego Moreno Escobar, Spanish football wingback
