= Íñigo García =

Íñigo García may refer to:

- Íñigo García (athlete), Spanish paralympic athlete
- Íñigo García (footballer), Spanish football midfielder
