= Fidel Escobar =

Panamanian footballer (born 1995)

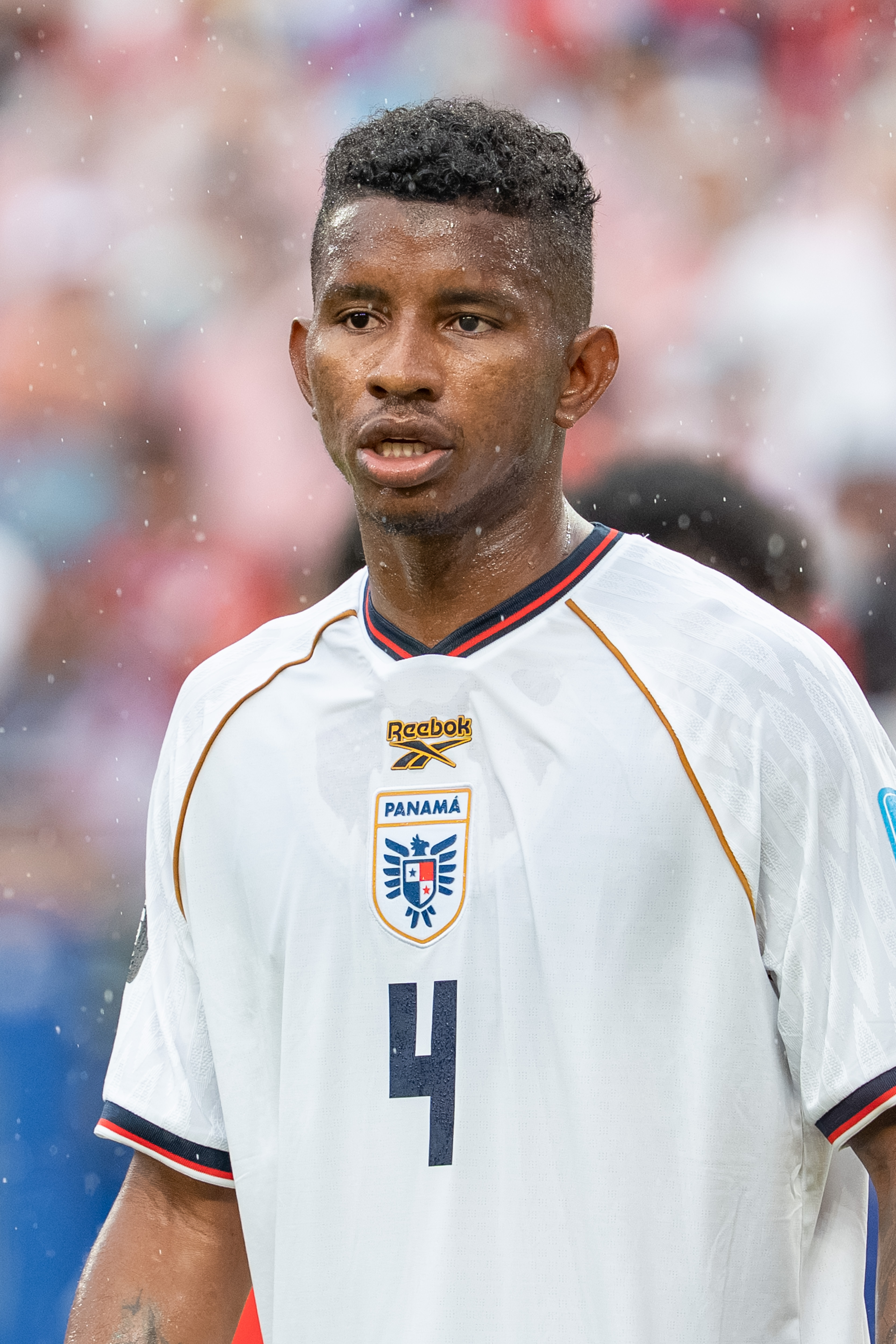
- Escobar with Panama in 2026

Personal information
- Full name: Fidel Escobar Mendieta
- Date of birth: 9 January 1995 (age 31)
- Place of birth: Panama City, Panama
- Height: 1.82 m (6 ft 0 in)
- Position: Centre-back

Team information
- Current team: Deportivo Saprissa
- Number: 21

Senior career*
Years	Team	Apps	(Gls)
2012–2013	San Francisco	16	(1)
2014–2020	San Miguelito	65	(6)
2016–2017	→ Sporting B (loan)	14	(0)
2017–2018	→ New York Red Bulls (loan)	12	(0)
2017–2018	→ New York Red Bulls II (loan)	6	(1)
2019	→ Correcaminos UAT (loan)	0	(0)
2019–2020	→ Córdoba (loan)	20	(0)
2020–2022	Alcorcón	24	(0)
2022	→ Cultural Leonesa (loan)	14	(1)
2022–	Deportivo Saprissa	128	(7)

International career^{‡}
2015	Panama U20	7	(3)
2015–	Panama	100	(4)
Medal record
Men's football
Representing Panama
CONCACAF Gold Cup
Runner-up	2023 United States–Canada	Team
CONCACAF Nations League
Runner-up	2025 United States	Team
- * Club domestic league appearances and goals as of 2 November 2025 ‡ National team caps and goals as of 22:33, 27 June 2026 (UTC)

Fidel Escobar Mendieta (born 9 January 1995) is a Panamanian professional footballer who plays as a centre-back for Liga FPD club Saprissa and the Panama national team.

== Club career ==
=== San Francisco ===
Born in Panama City, Escobar graduated from San Francisco's youth setup, and made his senior debut during the 2012–13 campaign, aged only 18. During the next season he established himself as a first team regular making 14 starts and scoring one goal. On 26 October 2013, Escobar scored his first goal for Los Monjes in a 2–0 victory over Chorrillo.

=== Sporting San Miguelito ===
After impressing with San Francisco, Escobar was signed by Sporting San Miguelito for the 2014 Clausura season. He made 14 appearances scoring one goal in his first season at the club. On 16 March 2014, Escobar scored his first goal with San Miguelito in a 2–2 draw with Alianza. In his two and a half seasons with the club Escobar made 65 league appearances scoring six goals.

==== Sporting B (loan) ====
As a result of his impressive play with his club and at the Under-20 World Cup Escobar received the attention of European clubs. During July 2016, Escobar was sent on loan with an option to buy to Sporting Clube de Portugal's reserve side Sporting B. Escobar made his debut for Sporting B on 6 August 2016 playing the entire match in a 1–2 loss to Portimonense S.C.

In January 2017, Escobar attempted to terminate his contract with Sporting in search of other opportunities and was threatened with legal action by the Portuguese side. Escobar eventually apologized to the club and was reinstated for the second half of the season. He made his return to the side on 15 April 2017, starting in a 2–0 victory over União da Madeira.

==== New York Red Bulls (loan) ====
On 27 July 2017 it was announced that Escobar was joining New York Red Bulls on an 18-month loan. For his play on 10 March 2018, in which he helped lead New York to a 4–0 victory over Portland Timbers in the team's first league match of the season, Escobar was named to the Starting XI for Major League Soccer's Team of the Week.

Escobar was loaned to affiliate side New York Red Bulls II of the United Soccer League for the match against Tampa Bay Rowdies on 14 April 2018. He opened the scoring for New York in the 5–0 victory. Escobar's loan was not extended by the Red Bulls at the end of their 2018 season.

==== Córdoba (loan) ====
On 10 July 2019, after a six-month spell at Correcaminos UAT, Escobar joined Spanish Segunda División B side Córdoba CF on loan for one year.

=== Alcorcón ===
On 28 July 2020, Escobar agreed to a three-year contract with AD Alcorcón in Segunda División. On 31 January 2022, he was loaned to Primera División RFEF side Cultural y Deportiva Leonesa.

== International career ==
Escobar played at the 2015 FIFA U-20 World Cup in New Zealand. He made his debut in the competition on 30 May 2015 scoring an 84th-minute equalizer in a 2–2 draw against heavily favored side Argentina.

Escobar made his senior debut for Panama on 8 February 2015 in a friendly match against the United States.

In May 2018, he was named in Panama's preliminary 35-man squad for the 2018 FIFA World Cup in Russia, and played all three matches in an eventual group-stage exit.

On 26 May 2026, he was selected in the 26-man squad for the 2026 FIFA World Cup. A month later, on 27 June, he featured in his 100th international match for Panama in the third group-stage match against England. (Note: Escobar played in four matches against Martinique which are not recognised as an official international by FIFA.)

== Career statistics ==
=== Club ===
As of 16 May 2026

Club	Season	League			Cup		Continental		Other		Total	
Club	Season	Division	Apps	Goals	Apps	Goals	Apps	Goals	Apps	Goals	Apps	Goals
San Francisco	2012–13	Liga Panameña de Fútbol	2	0	—		—		—		2	0
San Francisco	2013–14	Liga Panameña de Fútbol	14	1	—		—		—		14	1
San Francisco	Total		16	1	—		—		—		16	1
San Miguelito	2013–14	Liga Panameña de Fútbol	14	1	—		—		—		14	1
San Miguelito	2014–15	Liga Panameña de Fútbol	25	2	—		—		—		25	2
San Miguelito	2015–16	Liga Panameña de Fútbol	26	3	—		—		—		26	3
San Miguelito	Total		65	6	—		—		—		65	6
Sporting B (loan)	2016-17	LigaPro	14	0	—		—		—		14	0
New York Red Bulls (loan)	2017	Major League Soccer	6	0	1	0	—		—		7	0
New York Red Bulls (loan)	2018	Major League Soccer	6	0	—		0	0	—		6	0
New York Red Bulls (loan)	Total		12	0	1	0	0	0	—		13	0
New York Red Bulls II (loan)	2017	United Soccer League	1	0	—		—		—		1	0
New York Red Bulls II (loan)	2018	United Soccer League	5	1	—		—		—		5	1
New York Red Bulls II (loan)	Total		6	1	—		—		—		6	1
Córdoba (loan)	2019–20	Segunda División B	20	0	0	0	—		—		20	0
Alcorcón	2020–21	Segunda División	17	0	2	0	—		—		19	0
Alcorcón	2021–22	Segunda División	7	0	2	0	—		—		9	0
Alcorcón	Total		24	0	4	0	—		—		28	0
Cultural Leonesa (loan)	2021–22	Primera Federación	14	1	—		—		—		14	1
Deportivo Saprissa	2022–23	Liga FPD	36	0	2	0	—		—		38	0
Deportivo Saprissa	2023–24	Liga FPD	41	6	0	0	2 (Note: Appearances in CONCACAF Champions Cup)	0	8 (Note: Appearances in Central American Cup)	0	51	6
Deportivo Saprissa	2024–25	Liga FPD	38	2	0	0	2	0	8	0	48	2
Deportivo Saprissa	2025–26	Liga FPD	25	0	1	1	0	0	4	0	30	1
Deportivo Saprissa	Total		140	8	3	1	4	0	20	0	167	9
Career total			310	17	8	1	4	0	20	0	343	18

=== International ===
As of match played 27 June 2026

Panama
Year	Apps	Goals
2015	2	0
2016	7 (Note: He featured in 4 unofficial FIFA matches: Martinique (2016, 2017, 2022 twice))	1
2017	11	0
2018	11	0
2019	11	0
2020	1	0
2021	8	0
2022	13	1
2023	16	1
2024	5	0
2025	11	1
2026	4	0
Total	100	4

==== International goals ====
Scores and results list Panama's goal tally first.

No.	Date	Venue	Opponent	Score	Result	Competition
1.	11 November 2016	Estadio Olímpico Metropolitano, San Pedro Sula, Honduras	Honduras	1–0	1–0	2018 FIFA World Cup qualification
2.	9 June 2022	Estadio Rommel Fernández, Panama City, Panama	Martinique	3–0	5–0	2022–23 CONCACAF Nations League A
3.	4 July 2023	Shell Energy Stadium, Houston, United States	El Salvador	1–1	2–2	2023 CONCACAF Gold Cup
4.	7 June 2025	FFB Stadium, Belmopan, Belize	Belize	1–0	2–0	2026 FIFA World Cup qualification

== Honours ==
New York Red Bulls

- MLS Supporters' Shield: 2018

Panama U20

- CONCACAF U-20 Championship runner-up: 2015

Panama

- CONCACAF Gold Cup runner-up: 2023
- CONCACAF Nations League runner-up: 2024–25

Individual

- CONCACAF Gold Cup Best XI: 2023
