= Kelechi Nwakali =

Nigerian footballer (born 1998)

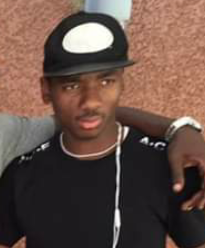
- Nwakali in 2015

Personal information
- Full name: Kelechi Nwakali
- Date of birth: 5 June 1998 (age 28)
- Place of birth: Owerri, Nigeria
- Height: 1.85 m (6 ft 1 in)
- Position: Midfielder

Team information
- Current team: Omonia 29M
- Number: 11

Youth career
- Diamond Football Academy

Senior career*
Years	Team	Apps	(Gls)
2016–2019	Arsenal	0	(0)
2016–2017	→ MVV (loan)	29	(2)
2017	→ VVV-Venlo (loan)	9	(1)
2018	→ MVV (loan)	16	(4)
2018–2019	→ Porto B (loan)	16	(0)
2019–2022	Huesca	29	(0)
2021	→ Alcorcón (loan)	18	(4)
2022–2023	Ponferradina	33	(1)
2023–2024	Chaves	32	(1)
2024–2026	Barnsley	27	(1)
2026–	Omonia 29M	1	(0)

International career^{‡}
2015	Nigeria U17	10	(4)
2019	Nigeria U23	3	(1)
2018–2022	Nigeria	4	(0)
- * Club domestic league appearances and goals as of 8:00, 20 September 2026 (UTC) ‡ National team caps and goals as of 11 August 2023

Kelechi Nwakali (born 5 June 1998) is a Nigerian professional footballer who plays as a midfielder for Cypriot First Division club Omonia 29M.

== Club career ==
=== Arsenal ===
Nwakali started his career at the Diamond Football Academy, Nigeria. After his fine performances at the 2015 FIFA U-17 World Cup in which he won the Golden Ball Award, he signed with English Premier League side Arsenal.

==== MVV Maastricht (loan) ====
On 16 September 2016, it was announced that Nwakali had signed for Eerste Divisie side MVV Maastricht on loan for the season. He then made his professional debut for the side the same day against Jong Ajax. He came on as a 92nd-minute substitute for Thomas Verheijdt as MVV won 1–0.

==== VVV-Venlo (loan) ====
On 29 August 2017, Nwakali joined Dutch side VVV-Venlo on loan for the first 6 months of the 2017–18 Eredivisie season. On 10 September 2017 Nwakali scored on his Eredivisie debut against FC Groningen, scoring a stoppage time equaliser in a 1–1 draw. After the initial six-month loan deal expired, Nwakali elected to leave Venlo and return to MVV Maastricht for the second half of the season.

==== Return to MVV Maastricht (loan) ====
On 24 January 2018, Nwakali returned to Maastricht on loan for the second half of the 2017–18 Eerste Divisie season, having played just 380 minutes of Eredivisie football with Venlo.

==== Porto B (loan) ====
Nwakali signed on loan for FC Porto on 18 July 2018, and was assigned to Porto B ahead of the 2018–19 LigaPro season.

In March 2019, he was stuck in Nigeria due to issues with his visa.

=== Huesca ===
On 2 September 2019, Nwakali joined Spanish Segunda División side SD Huesca on a three-year deal. After leaving the club he thanked Arsenal for his time with them, despite not making a first-team appearance.

Nwakali made his La Liga debut on 13 September 2020, in a 1–1 away draw against Villarreal CF. On 31 January of the following year, he was loaned to AD Alcorcón in the second division, for the remainder of the season.

On 5 April 2022, Nwakali's contract was terminated early. The following day Nwakali released an official statement through his official Twitter account denouncing his treatment by SD Huesca and the club's Sporting Director, Rubén García, starting in December 2021, by pressuring him not to attend the Africa Cup of Nations, for which he had been called up, paying his wages late, pressuring him to sign a new contract in order to get paid the wages he was owed, trying to force his transfer out of the club and, finally, suspending him and banning him from club trainings.

=== Ponferradina ===
On 21 July 2022, Nwakali signed for fellow Spanish second division side SD Ponferradina.

=== Chaves ===
On 20 July 2023, Nwakali signed for Primeira Liga side Chaves.

=== Barnsley ===
On 12 August 2024, Nwakali joined League One club Barnsley for an undisclosed fee on a three-year deal. On 27 August 2026, Barnsley announced Nwakali had left the club by mutual consent.

=== Omonia 29M ===
On 1 September 2026, following his departure from Barnsley, Nwakali signed for Cypriot First Division club Omonia 29M on a one-year contract.

== International career ==
Nwakali was named in the provisional squad for the Nigeria U17 side before the 2013 FIFA U-17 World Cup but did not make the final squad. However, coming into the 2015 U-17 World Cup he was named captain as he led his country to the title, winning the Golden Ball Award along the way. On Christmas Day 2021 he was called up to Senior team that will participate in the 2021 Africa Cup of Nations in Cameroon which was postponed to 2022 because of the COVID-19 pandemic.

== Career statistics ==
As of match played 22 July 2023

Appearances and goals by club, season and competition
Club	Season	League			National cup		League cup		Other		Total	
Club	Season	Division	Apps	Goals	Apps	Goals	Apps	Goals	Apps	Goals	Apps	Goals
Arsenal	2016–17	Premier League	0	0	0	0	—		0	0	0	0
MVV (loan)	2016–17	Eerste Divisie	29	2	1	0	—		4 (Note: Appearances in the Eerste Divisie promotion play-offs)	1	34	3
VVV-Venlo (loan)	2017–18	Eredivisie	9	1	3	0	—		—		12	1
MVV (loan)	2017–18	Eerste Divisie	16	4	0	0	—		2	0	18	4
Porto B (loan)	2018–19	LigaPro	16	0	—		—		—		16	0
Huesca	2019–20	Segunda División	5	0	0	0	—		—		5	0
Huesca	2020–21	La Liga	5	0	2	0	—		—		7	0
Huesca	2021–22	Segunda División	19	0	2	0	—		—		21	0
Huesca	Total		29	0	4	0	—		0	0	33	0
Alcorcón (loan)	2020–21	Segunda División	18	4	0	0	—		—		18	4
Ponferradina	2022–23	Segunda División	36	1	1	0	—		—		37	1
Chaves	2023–24	Primeira Liga	8	0	0	0	1	0	0	0	1	0
Career total			153	12	9	0	1	0	6	1	169	13

== Honours ==
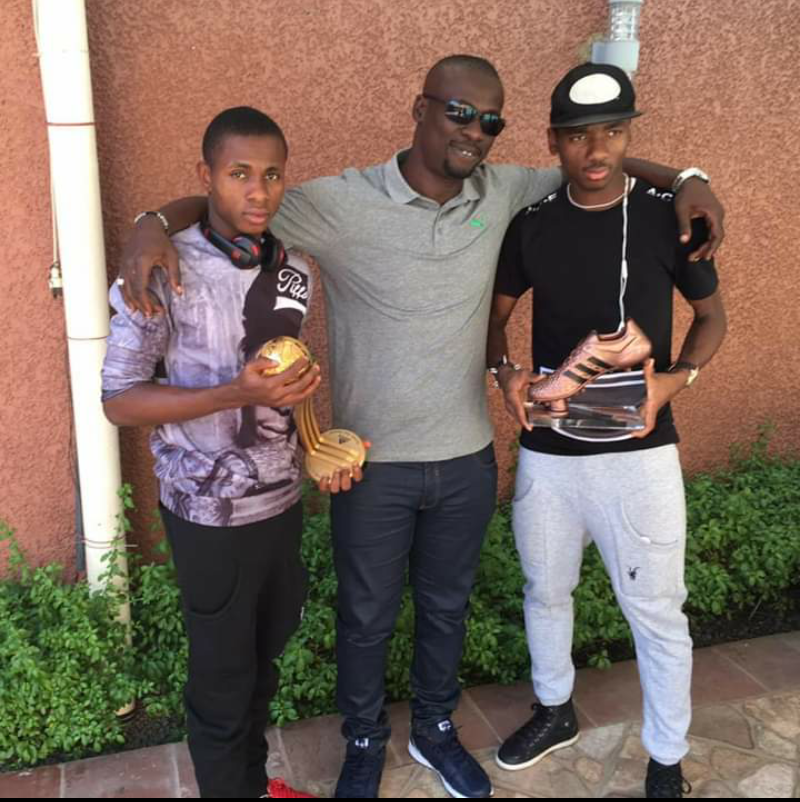
Nwakali (right) with Victor Apugo (center) and Samuel Chukwueze (left) in 2015

Nigeria U17

- FIFA U-17 World Cup: 2015

Individual

- FIFA U-17 World Cup Golden Ball: 2015
