= Marc Gual =

Spanish association football player

Personal information
- Full name: Marc Gual Huguet
- Date of birth: 13 March 1996 (age 30)
- Place of birth: Badalona, Spain
- Height: 1.84 m (6 ft 0 in)
- Position: Forward

Team information
- Current team: Kairat
- Number: 28

Youth career
- 2004–2005: Badalona
- 2005–2010: Barcelona
- 2010–2013: Badalona
- 2013–2015: Espanyol

Senior career*
Years	Team	Apps	(Gls)
2015–2016	Espanyol B	35	(13)
2016–2020	Sevilla B	48	(15)
2018–2019	→ Zaragoza (loan)	29	(6)
2019–2020	→ Girona (loan)	19	(4)
2020	→ Real Madrid B (loan)	6	(2)
2020–2022	Alcorcón	50	(6)
2022–2023	Dnipro-1	0	(0)
2022–2023	→ Jagiellonia Białystok (loan)	38	(19)
2023–2025	Legia Warsaw	63	(17)
2025–2026	Rio Ave	10	(0)
2026–	Kairat	16	(12)

International career
2017	Spain U21	3	(0)
- * Club domestic league appearances and goals as of 09:42, 27 October 2026 (UTC)

Marc Gual Huguet (born 13 March 1996) is a Spanish professional footballer who plays as a forward for Kazakhstan Premier League club Kairat.

== Club career ==
=== Espanyol ===
Born in Badalona, Barcelona, Catalonia, Gual represented CF Badalona and FC Barcelona as a youth before joining RCD Espanyol's youth categories in 2013. He made his debut for the reserves on 4 October 2015, starting in a 1–1 home draw against Valencia CF Mestalla in the Segunda División B.

Gual scored his first goal as a senior on 3 January 2016, his team's first in a 2–2 away draw against Villarreal CF B. On 12 March, he scored a brace in a 4–0 home routing of CD Olímpic de Xàtiva.

=== Sevilla ===
On 9 November 2016, Gual signed a three-year contract with another reserve team, Sevilla Atlético in Segunda División, mainly as a replacement to injured Carlos Fernández and Maryan Shved. He made his professional debut ten days later, starting and scoring his team's second in a 2–2 away draw against RCD Mallorca. Gual scored a brace in a 2–3 away loss against Elche CF on 9 April, and a week later, he scored a hat-trick in a 6–2 home rout of Real Valladolid to take his tally up to eight.

=== Loan to Real Zaragoza ===
Gual was loaned to fellow second division side Real Zaragoza, for one year, on 9 August 2018.

=== Loan to Girona ===
On 28 June of the following year, he joined freshly relegated side Girona FC also in a temporary deal.

=== Loan to Real Madrid Castilla ===
On 30 January 2020, Gual moved to Real Madrid Castilla on loan for the remaining part of the season. On 1 September, he agreed to a permanent two-year contract with AD Alcorcón in the second division.

=== Dnipro ===
Gual terminated his contract with Alcorcón on 7 January 2022. He then signed with Ukrainian Premier League club SC Dnipro-1 on a deal until the summer of 2024. Only 42 days on from his signing, and before the resumption of the Ukrainian season after the winter break, the league was suspended due to the Russian invasion and he escaped the country.

FIFA suspended the contracts of all foreign players and coaches affiliated with the Ukrainian Association of Football on 7 March 2022.

=== Loan to Jagiellonia Białystok ===
Sixteen days later, Gual joined Polish Ekstraklasa side Jagiellonia Białystok until the end of the season. On his debut on 3 April, he scored the winner in the seventh minute of added time in a 2–1 home victory over Zagłębie Lubin. On 28 June, his loan was extended for another year.

=== Legia Warsaw ===
On 11 May 2023, Gual signed a three-year deal with the Polish Cup holders Legia Warsaw, effective from 1 July. On 7 November 2024, Gual scored two goals in a 4–0 victory over Dinamo Minsk in a UEFA Conference League league stage game.

=== Rio Ave ===
On 9 August 2025, Gual joined Primeira Liga club Rio Ave on a one-year contract for a reported €200,000 fee.

=== Kairat ===
On 12 June 2026, Kazakhstan Premier League club Kairat announced the signing of Gual from Rio Ave, on a contract until the end of 2027.

== Career statistics ==
As of match played 25 October 2026

Appearances and goals by club, season and competition
Club	Season	League			National cup (Note: Includes Copa del Rey, Polish Cup, Taça de Portugal)		Europe		Other		Total	
Club	Season	Division	Apps	Goals	Apps	Goals	Apps	Goals	Apps	Goals	Apps	Goals
Espanyol B	2015–16	Segunda División B	24	7	—		—		—		24	7
Espanyol B	2016–17	Segunda División B	11	6	—		—		—		11	6
Espanyol B	Total		35	13	—		—		—		35	13
Sevilla Atlético	2016–17	Segunda División	24	14	—		—		—		24	14
Sevilla Atlético	2017–18	Segunda División	24	1	—		—		—		24	1
Sevilla Atlético	Total		48	15	—		—		—		48	15
Real Zaragoza (loan)	2018–19	Segunda División	29	6	0	0	—		—		29	6
Girona (loan)	2019–20	Segunda División	19	4	3	2	—		—		22	6
Real Madrid Castilla (loan)	2019–20	Segunda División B	6	2	—		—		—		6	2
Alcorcón	2020–21	Segunda División	36	5	1	0	—		—		37	5
Alcorcón	2021–22	Segunda División	14	1	0	0	—		—		14	1
Alcorcón	Total		50	6	1	0	—		—		51	6
Jagiellonia Białystok (loan)	2021–22	Ekstraklasa	7	3	2	0	—		—		9	3
Jagiellonia Białystok (loan)	2022–23	Ekstraklasa	31	16	2	1	—		—		33	17
Jagiellonia Białystok (loan)	Total		38	19	4	1	—		—		42	20
Legia Warsaw	2023–24	Ekstraklasa	33	8	2	1	13 (Note: Appearances in UEFA Conference League)	2	1 (Note: Appearance in Polish Super Cup)	0	49	11
Legia Warsaw	2024–25	Ekstraklasa	30	9	5	3	13	7	—		48	19
Legia Warsaw	2025–26	Ekstraklasa	0	0	—		2 (Note: Appearances in UEFA Europa League)	0	0	0	2	0
Legia Warsaw	Total		63	17	7	4	28	9	1	0	99	30
Rio Ave	2025–26	Primeira Liga	10	0	1	0	—		—		11	0
Kairat	2026	Kazakhstan Premier League	16	12	0	0	10 (Note: Six appearances in UEFA Champions League, two appearances in UEFA Europa League, one appearance and one goal in UEFA Conference League)	2	0 (Note: Appearances in Kazakhstan Super Cup)	0	26	14
Career total			314	94	16	7	38	11	1	0	369	111

== Honours ==
Legia Warsaw

- Polish Cup: 2024–25
- Polish Super Cup: 2023

Individual

- Ekstraklasa Forward of the Season: 2022–23
- Ekstraklasa Ekstraklasa top scorer: 2022–23
- Ekstraklasa Player of the Month: April 2023
