= Álvaro Juan =

Spanish footballer

Personal information
- Full name: Álvaro Juan de la Torre Sánchez
- Date of birth: 20 October 1999 (age 27)
- Place of birth: Talavera de la Reina, Spain
- Height: 1.78 m (5 ft 10 in)
- Position: Attacking midfielder

Team information
- Current team: Racing Ferrol
- Number: 7

Youth career
- Atlético Madrid

Senior career*
Years	Team	Apps	(Gls)
2018–2020	Rayo Vallecano B	41	(8)
2020–2022	Alcorcón	9	(0)
2021–2022	→ Cultural Leonesa (loan)	39	(0)
2022–2023	Talavera	29	(4)
2023–2025	Mérida	34	(2)
2025–	Racing Ferrol	31	(3)
- * Club domestic league appearances and goals as of 9 June 2026

Álvaro Juan de la Torre Sánchez (born 20 October 1999), known as Álvaro Juan, is a Spanish footballer who plays as an attacking midfielder for Primera Federación club Racing Ferrol.

== Club career ==
Born in Talavera de la Reina, Toledo, Castilla–La Mancha, Álvaro Juan finished his formation with Atlético Madrid. In July 2018, he joined Rayo Vallecano and was initially assigned to the reserves in Tercera División.

Álvaro Juan made his senior debut with the B-team on 26 August 2018, playing the last 15 minutes in a 2–1 home win against CD San Fernando de Henares. He scored his first goal on 9 September, netting his team's second in a 2–2 home draw against Las Rozas CF.

On 2 September 2020, Álvaro Juan signed for AD Alcorcón and was initially assigned to the B-team also in the fourth tier. He made his first team debut on 26 October, coming on as a late substitute for Álex Escardó in a 0–2 home loss against RCD Mallorca.

On 31 January 2021, Álvaro Juan joined Segunda División B side Cultural y Deportiva Leonesa on loan for the remainder of the season. On 27 July, his loan was extended for a further year, with the club now in Primera División RFEF.
