= Lucas Anacker =

Brazilian footballer (born 1996)

Personal information
- Full name: Lucas Nunes Anacker
- Date of birth: 22 September 1996 (age 30)
- Place of birth: Rio Grande, Brazil
- Height: 1.87 m (6 ft 2 in)
- Position: Goalkeeper

Team information
- Current team: Levadiakos
- Number: 33

Youth career
- 2007–2009: Avenida
- 2010: AAPS
- 2010–2015: Internacional

Senior career*
Years	Team	Apps	(Gls)
2016–2018	Avilés	24	(0)
2018	→ Burgos (loan)	0	(0)
2018–2020	Ibiza	34	(0)
2020–2021	Atzeneta	25	(0)
2021–2023	Cornellà	76	(0)
2023–2024	Alcorcón	13	(0)
2024–	Levadiakos	13	(0)
- * Club domestic league appearances and goals as of 6 September 2026

Lucas Nunes Anacker (born 22 September 1996) is a Brazilian professional footballer who plays as a goalkeeper for Greek Super League club Levadiakos.

== Career ==
Born in Rio Grande but raised in Santa Cruz do Sul, both in the Rio Grande do Sul state, Anacker finished his formation with Internacional. In September 2015, he moved abroad and joined Tercera División side Real Avilés CF on trial, signing a contract with the club in January of the following year.

Anacker made his senior debut on 24 April 2016, starting in a 4–0 away win over Astur CF. He would spend his first two seasons as a backup to veteran Guillermo, before becoming a starter during the 2017–18 season, after Guillermo retired.

On 28 December 2017, Anacker moved on loan to Segunda División B side Burgos CF until June. A backup to Mikel Saizar, he failed to make an appearance for the club, but still signed for fellow league team UD Ibiza in September 2018.

Anacker became a regular starter for the Balearic side, and renewed his contract for a further year on 30 May 2019. During the 2019–20 campaign, however, he lost his starting spot to new signing Germán Parreño.

On 1 September 2020, Anacker agreed to a contract with third division newcomers Atzeneta UE. On 7 July of the following year, after suffering team relegation, he joined UE Cornellà in the Primera División RFEF.

On 24 July 2023, Anacker reached an agreement with CF Rayo Majadahonda also in the third division to join the club, but signed for Segunda División side AD Alcorcón on 3 August. Initially a backup to Chus Ruiz, he made his professional debut at the age of 27 on 11 December, starting in a 1–0 away loss to CD Tenerife.
