= José León (footballer) =

Spanish footballer (born 1995)

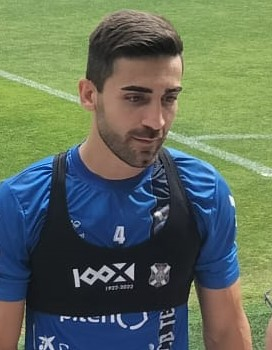
- León in 2022

Personal information
- Full name: José León Bernal
- Date of birth: 3 February 1995 (age 31)
- Place of birth: Madrid, Spain
- Height: 1.81 m (5 ft 11 in)
- Position: Centre back

Team information
- Current team: Tenerife
- Number: 4

Youth career
- 2003–2004: Aviación
- 2004–2014: Real Madrid

Senior career*
Years	Team	Apps	(Gls)
2013–2015	Real Madrid C	50	(0)
2014–2018	Real Madrid B	42	(2)
2016–2017	→ Cultural Leonesa (loan)	6	(0)
2018–2019	Rayo Vallecano	0	(0)
2019	→ Eskilstuna (loan)	11	(0)
2019–2020	Fuenlabrada	19	(0)
2020–2021	Alcorcón	35	(2)
2021–	Tenerife	147	(4)

International career
2013–2014	Spain U19	9	(0)
- * Club domestic league appearances and goals as of 9 June 2026

José León Bernal (born 3 February 1995) is a Spanish professional footballer who plays for CD Tenerife. Mainly a central defender, he can also play as a defensive midfielder.

== Football career ==
=== Real Madrid ===
In 2004, aged seven, León joined Real Madrid's youth academy from local CD Aviación. He made his senior debut in the 2013–14 season, playing 17 games for the C-team in the Segunda División B.

On 25 May 2014, León made his professional debut, coming on as a second-half substitute in a 0–2 loss at Córdoba CF in the Segunda División. On 31 August 2016, he was loaned to Cultural y Deportiva Leonesa for one year.

=== Rayo Vallecano ===
On 25 August 2018, León signed a two-year contract with La Liga side Rayo Vallecano. However, aged 23 and registered in the B-team, he could not play for either side.

In February 2019, León joined Swedish side AFC Eskilstuna on loan until June. On 29 August, after making no appearances for Rayo, he terminated his contract with Rayo.

=== Fuenlabrada ===
On 30 August 2019, free agent León agreed to a one-year deal with CF Fuenlabrada, also in the second division. He made his debut for the club on 1 October, starting in a 0–1 loss at CD Numancia, and contributed with 21 matches overall during the season.

=== Alcorcón ===
On 20 September 2020, León signed for AD Alcorcón, still in division two. He became a regular starter for the club, and scored his first professional goal on 20 December by netting his team's second in a 2–1 home win over FC Cartagena.

=== Tenerife ===
On 20 June 2021, León agreed to a two-year contract with fellow second level side CD Tenerife.

== Honours ==
Cultural Leonesa

- Segunda División B: 2016–17
