= Èric Callís =

Spanish footballer

Personal information
- Full name: Èric Callís Torrent
- Date of birth: 14 January 2002 (age 24)
- Place of birth: La Vall de Bianya, Spain
- Height: 1.70 m (5 ft 7 in)
- Position: Right-back

Team information
- Current team: Peralada

Youth career
- La Canya
- 2010–2015: Olot
- 2015–2021: Girona

Senior career*
Years	Team	Apps	(Gls)
2021–2023	Olot	58	(0)
2023–2024	Alcorcón B	30	(0)
2023–2024	Alcorcón	2	(0)
2024–2025	Avilés Industrial	25	(1)
2025–	Peralada	7	(0)
- * Club domestic league appearances and goals as of 9 November 2025

Èric Callís Torrent (born 14 January 2002) is a Spanish footballer who plays as a right-back for Tercera Federación club Peralada.

== Career ==
Callís was born in La Vall de Bianya, Girona, Catalonia, and joined Girona FC's youth sides in 2015, after representing UE Olot and AE La Canya. On 26 July 2021, after finishing his formation, he returned to Olot and was assigned to the main squad in Tercera División RFEF.

Callís made his senior debut on 5 September 2021, coming on as a second-half substitute for Eloi Amagat in a 3–1 home win over UE Castelldefels. Regularly used during the season as they achieved promotion to Segunda Federación, he renewed his contract for a further year on 15 June 2022.

Callís left Olot on 23 June 2023, after the club's relegation, and was announced as a part of the squad of AD Alcorcón's B-team in August. He made his first team debut on 1 November, starting in a 1–0 away win over CDA Navalcarnero, for the campaign's Copa del Rey.

Callís made his professional debut with Alkor on 21 April 2024, replacing Fede Vico in a 2–0 Segunda División away loss to SD Eibar.
