= CD Aviación =

Aviación
- Full name: Club Deportivo Aviación
- Founded: 1970
- Dissolved: 2017
- Ground: Parque de las Cruces, Madrid, Community of Madrid, Spain
- Chairman: (Spain) Juan José Carrasco
- Manager: (Spain) Jose Ignacio (Panocha)
- 2016–17: Tercera de Aficionados – Group 9, 14th of 18
Home colours	Away colours

Club Deportivo Aviación was a football team based in Madrid in the autonomous community of Community of Madrid. Founded in 1970, it was dissolved in 2017. The historic field Pedro Vives was demolished by order of the City Council of Madrid on 11 November 2014, and the club subsequently played at the Parque de las Cruces.

== Season to season ==
Season	Tier	Division	Place	Copa del Rey
1974–75	8	3ª Reg.	1st	
1975–76	7	3ª Reg. P.	1st	
1976–77	6	2ª Reg.	4th	
1977–78	6	1ª Reg.	5th	
1978–79	6	1ª Reg.	3rd	
1979–80	5	Reg. Pref.	17th	
1980–81	6	1ª Reg.	7th	
1981–82	6	1ª Reg.	15th	
1982–83	6	1ª Reg.	15th	
1983–84	7	2ª Reg.	1st	
1984–85	6	1ª Reg.	6th	
1985–86	6	1ª Reg.	7th	
1986–87	6	1ª Reg.	12th	
1987–88	6	1ª Reg.	5th	
1988–89	6	1ª Reg.	5th	
1989–90	6	1ª Reg.	9th	
1990–91	6	1ª Reg.	5th	
1991–92	6	1ª Reg.	3rd	
1992–93	5	Reg. Pref.	14th	
1993–94	5	Reg. Pref.	16th	

Season	Tier	Division	Place	Copa del Rey
1994–95	6	1ª Reg.	2nd	
1995–96	5	Reg. Pref.	10th	
1996–97	5	Reg. Pref.	15th	
1997–98	6	1ª Reg.	4th	
1998–99	6	1ª Reg.	1st	
1999–2000	5	Reg. Pref.	3rd	
2000–01	5	Reg. Pref.	9th	
2001–02	5	Reg. Pref.	12th	
2002–03	5	Reg. Pref.	14th	
2003–04	5	Reg. Pref.	14th	
2004–05	5	Reg. Pref.	9th	
2005–06	5	Reg. Pref.	4th	
2006–07	5	Reg. Pref.	6th	
2007–08	5	Reg. Pref.	14th	
2008–09	5	Reg. Pref.	15th	
2009–10	6	1ª Afic.	4th	
2010–11	6	1ª Afic.	4th	
2011–12	6	1ª Afic.	5th	
2012–13	6	1ª Afic.	6th	
2013–14	6	1ª Afic.	6th	

Season	Tier	Division	Place	Copa del Rey
2014–15	6	1ª Afic.	18th	
2015–16	7	2ª Afic.	17th	
2016–17	8	3ª Afic.	14th	
