= Abdel Al Badaoui =

French professional footballer

Personal information
- Full name: Abdelhafid Al Badaoui Sabri
- Date of birth: 25 May 1996 (age 30)
- Place of birth: Morocco
- Height: 1.79 m (5 ft 10 in)
- Position: Attacking midfielder

Team information
- Current team: Hostert
- Number: 30

Youth career
- Visé
- 2014–2016: Sint-Truiden
- 2016–2017: Standard Liège

Senior career*
Years	Team	Apps	(Gls)
2014	Visé	1	(0)
2017–2021	RFC Seraing	85	(19)
2021–2022	Alcorcón	17	(0)
2022	→ Waasland-Beveren (loan)	11	(0)
2022–2023	Al Kharaitiyat		
2024	Al-Duhail	0	(0)
2026–	Hostert	13	(1)
- * Club domestic league appearances and goals as of 13 June 2026

Abdelhafid "Abdel" Al Badaoui Sabri (born 25 May 1996) is a Moroccan professional footballer who plays as an attacking midfielder for Luxembourg National Division club Hostert.

== Club career ==
Al Badaoui made his senior debut for Visé on 30 March 2014, coming on as a late substitute for Idrissa Camará in a 0–0 Belgian First Division B home draw against Eupen. In July of that year, he moved to Sint-Truiden and was initially assigned to the under-19 squad.

In 2016, after playing for STVV's under-21 squad, Al Badaoui signed for Standard Liège, but only played for their under-21 side. In the following year, he signed for RFC Seraing in the Belgian First Amateur Division.

Al Badaoui subsequently established himself as a starter for Seraing, and renewed his contract with the club in May 2019. He helped in their promotion to the second division in 2020 and to the Belgian First Division A in 2021, but terminated his contract with the club on 23 July 2021.

On 31 July 2021, Al Badaoui signed a two-year contract with Spanish Segunda División side AD Alcorcón. The following 15 January, he returned to Belgium after agreeing to a loan deal with Waasland-Beveren until June.
