= Lucho Vega =

Argentine footballer

Personal information
- Full name: Luciano Gastón Vega Albornoz
- Date of birth: 9 April 1999 (age 27)
- Place of birth: Córdoba, Argentina
- Height: 1.87 m (6 ft 2 in)
- Position: Midfielder

Team information
- Current team: Petrolul Ploiești
- Number: 8

Youth career
- –2016: Deportivo Atalaya
- 2016–2020: River Plate

Senior career*
Years	Team	Apps	(Gls)
2020–2021	River Plate	0	(0)
2020–2021	→ Estoril (loan)	0	(0)
2020–2021	→ Estoril U23 (loan)	18	(5)
2021–2022	Estoril	5	(0)
2021–2022	→ Alcorcón (loan)	16	(0)
2022–2023	Marítimo	7	(0)
2023	→ Covilhã (loan)	17	(1)
2023–2026	União Leiria	60	(7)
2026–	Petrolul Ploiești	11	(0)
- * Club domestic league appearances and goals as of 6 November 2026

Luciano "Lucho" Gastón Vega Albornoz (born 9 April 1999) is an Argentine professional footballer who plays as a midfielder for Petrolul Ploiești.

== Career ==
A youth product of Deportivo Atalaya and River Plate, Vega signed his first professional contract with the Argentine club on 31 January 2020 and went on a 2-year loan to Estoril. He transferred permanently to Estoril on 31 March 2021.

Vega made his professional debut with Estoril in a 2–1 Taça da Liga win over C.D. Nacional on 25 July 2021. He made his Primeira Liga debut on 7 August, replacing Loreintz Rosier late into a 2–0 win at F.C. Arouca.

On 31 August 2021, Vega moved to Spanish Segunda División side AD Alcorcón on a one-year loan deal.

On 2 July 2022, Vega moved to Madeira to sign for Marítimo for three seasons. In January 2023 he went on loan to Sporting Covilhã on the second Portuguese tier.

On 27 July 2023, Marítimo announced that Vega's contract had been terminated by mutual agreement.

On 1 August 2023, União De Leiria announced Lucho Vega sign with a contract until 2025.
