= Bartłomiej Żynel =

Polish footballer

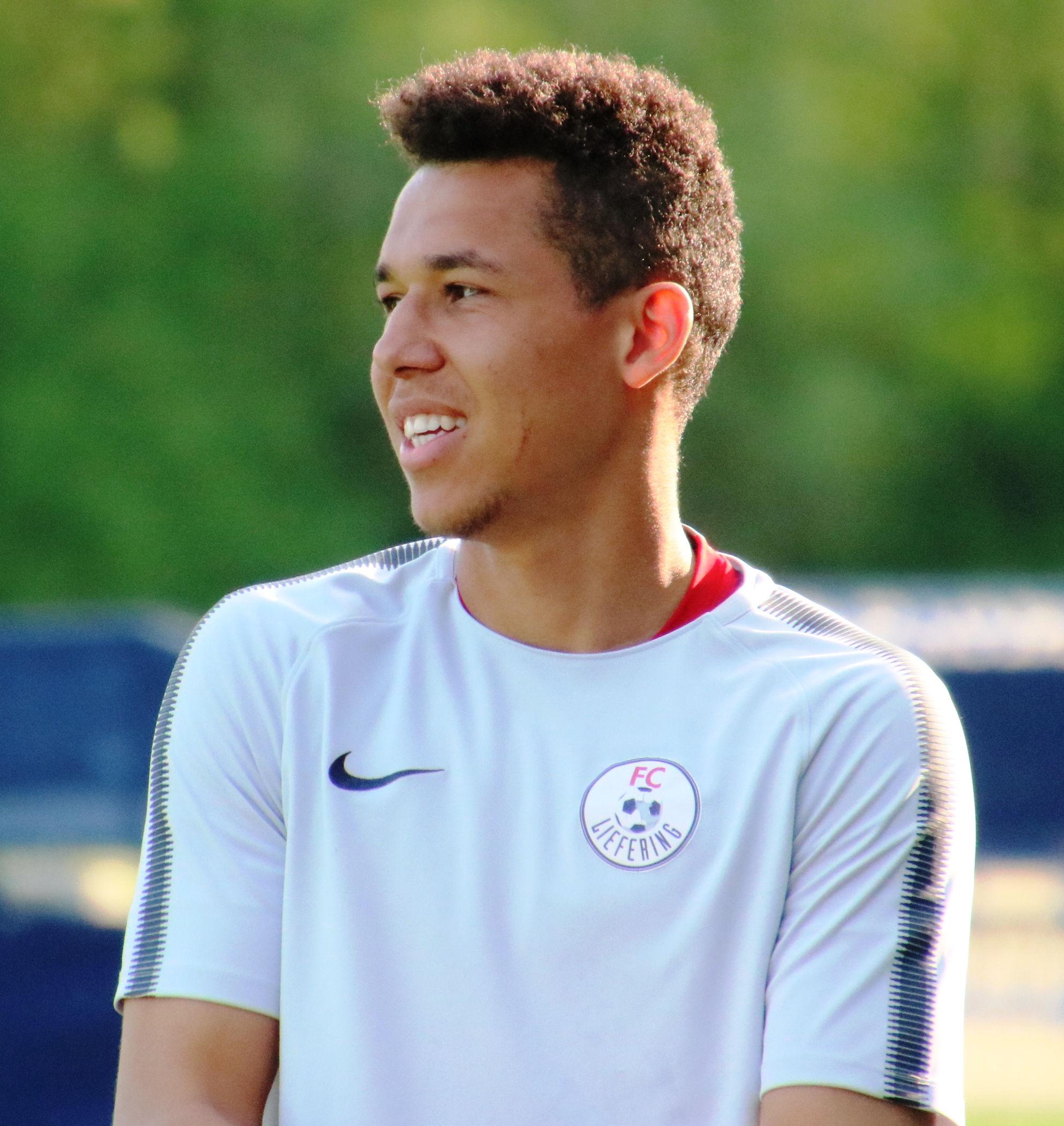
- Żynel with Liefering in 2018

Personal information
- Date of birth: 9 April 1998 (age 28)
- Place of birth: Białystok, Poland
- Height: 1.87 m (6 ft 2 in)
- Position: Goalkeeper

Youth career
- 2009–2014: Jagiellonia Białystok
- 2014–2018: Red Bull Salzburg

Senior career*
Years	Team	Apps	(Gls)
2015–2018	Liefering	3	(0)
2018–2021	Wisła Płock	9	(0)
2021–2022	Stolem Gniewino	22	(0)
2022–2026	Jagiellonia Białystok	0	(0)
2022–2026	Jagiellonia Białystok II	42	(0)

International career
2013–2014	Poland U16	3	(0)
2014–2015	Poland U17	10	(0)
2015	Poland U18	1	(0)
- * Club domestic league appearances and goals as of 20:05, 29 May 2026 (UTC)

Bartłomiej Żynel (born 9 April 1998) is a Polish professional footballer who plays as a goalkeeper.

== Club career ==
He made his Austrian Football First League debut for FC Liefering on 19 May 2017 in a game against WSG Wattens.

On 28 July 2022, he returned to Jagiellonia on a one-year contract with an extension option, joining their reserve team with plans to train with senior team. His deal was extended for a further two years on 26 June 2024.

== Honours ==
Red Bull Salzburg Youth

- UEFA Youth League: 2016–17

Jagiellonia Białystok II

- Polish Cup (Podlasie regionals): 2022–23
