= Guito =

Spanish footballer

Personal information
- Full name: Diego Moreno Escobar
- Date of birth: 16 January 1998 (age 28)
- Place of birth: Madrid, Spain
- Height: 1.74 m (5 ft 9 in)
- Positions: Left back; winger

Team information
- Current team: Siello

Youth career
- 2013–2017: Getafe

Senior career*
Years	Team	Apps	(Gls)
2017	Getafe B	1	(0)
2017–2019	San Fernando	58	(3)
2019–2020	Alcorcón B	28	(0)
2020–2021	Alcorcón	2	(0)
2021–2022	Móstoles	14	(0)
2022	Marbella	13	(0)
2022–2023	Pozuelo de Alarcón	28	(0)
2023–2024	Coria	28	(0)
2024–	Siello	9	(0)
- * Club domestic league appearances and goals as of 9 November 2025

Diego Moreno Escobar (born 16 January 1998), commonly known as Guito, is a Spanish footballer who plays for Tercera Federación club Siello as either a left back or a left winger.

== Club career ==
Guito was born in Madrid, and finished his formation with Getafe CF. He made his senior debut with the reserves on 2 April 2017, starting in a 0–2 Tercera División home loss against CD San Fernando de Henares; it was his maiden appearance for the side.

In August 2017, Guito joined San Fernando in the fourth division. On 18 July 2019, after two seasons as a starter, he moved to AD Alcorcón and was initially assigned to the B-team in the same category.

Guito made his first team debut for Alkor on 15 November 2020, starting in a 0–1 away loss against CD Leganés in the Segunda División championship. In July of the following year, after one further first team appearance, he moved to Segunda División RFEF side CD Móstoles URJC.
