= Hugo Fraile =

Spanish footballer

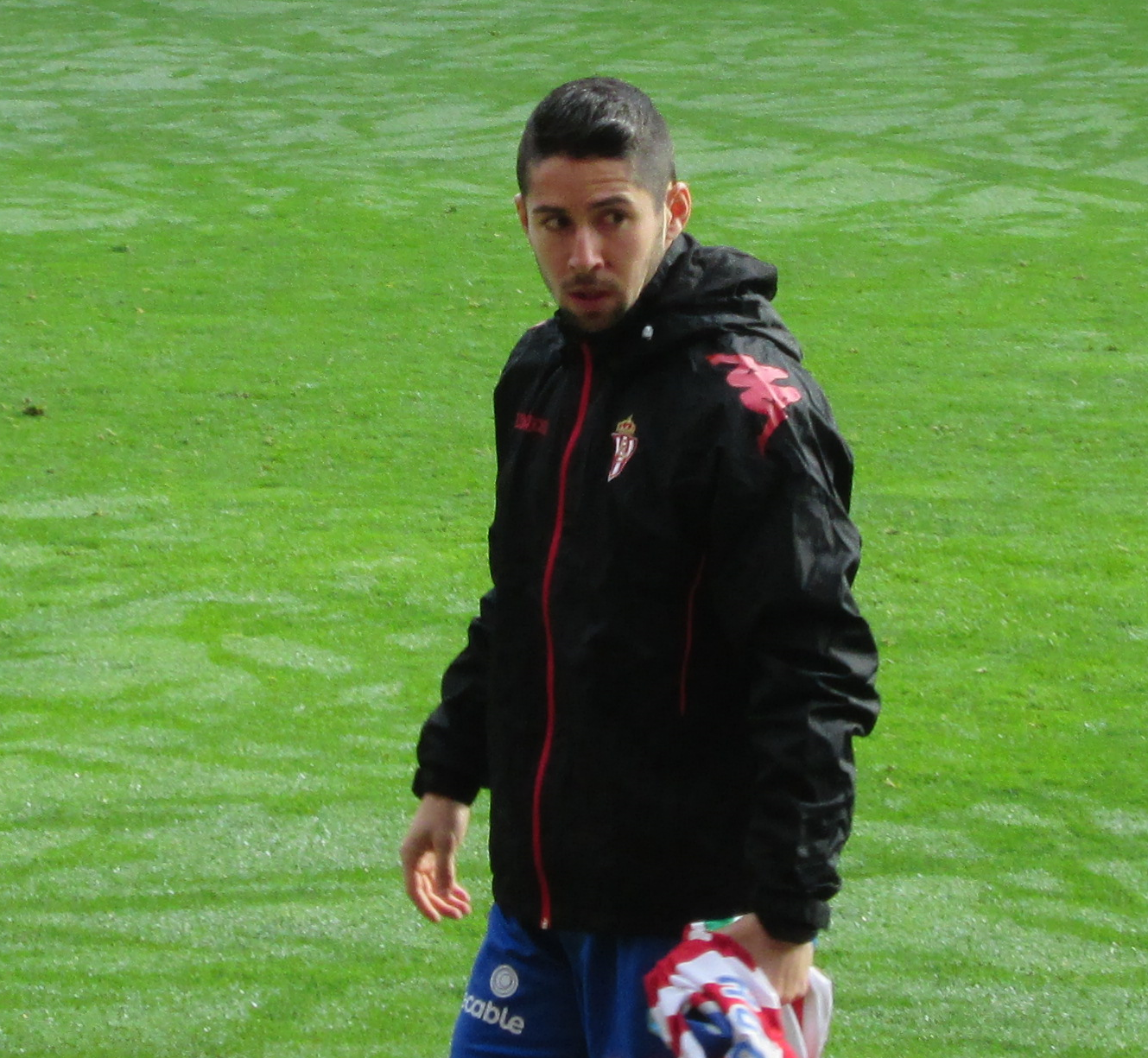
- Fraile before a game with Sporting Gijón

Personal information
- Full name: Hugo Fraile Martínez
- Date of birth: 16 March 1987 (age 39)
- Place of birth: Huelva, Spain
- Height: 1.70 m (5 ft 7 in)
- Position: Winger

Youth career
- San Fernando Henares
- 2004–2005: Atlético Madrid

Senior career*
| Years | Team | Apps | (Gls) |
| 2005–2006 | Atlético Madrid C | | |
| 2006–2011 | Rayo Vallecano B | 100 | (27) |
| 2007–2010 | Rayo Vallecano | 7 | (0) |
| 2011–2012 | Getafe B | 32 | (11) |
| 2012–2013 | Getafe | 4 | (0) |
| 2013–2016 | Sporting Gijón | 33 | (5) |
| 2016–2017 | Elche | 15 | (1) |
| 2017–2020 | Fuenlabrada | 109 | (23) |
| 2020–2022 | Alcorcón | 70 | (6) |
| Total | | 370 | (73) |
- * Club domestic league appearances and goals

Hugo Fraile Martínez (born 16 March 1987) is a Spanish former professional footballer who played as a right winger.

== Club career ==
Fraile was in Huelva, Andalusia. After graduating from Atlético Madrid's youth system, he made his debut as a senior with its C side in 2005, in the Tercera División.

Fraile signed for Rayo Vallecano in the summer of 2006, being assigned to the reserves also in the fourth division. He played his first game with the first team on 3 September 2008, coming on as a substitute in a 3–1 away win against SD Huesca in the second round of the Copa del Rey.

On 19 July 2011, Fraile joined another reserve team, Getafe CF B of Segunda División B. He made his debut with the main squad on 5 May of the following year, playing the last 13 minutes of a 0–0 La Liga away draw with Athletic Bilbao.

On 18 May 2012, Fraile was definitely promoted to the first team. Having appeared rarely during the season, he was transferred to Segunda División club Sporting de Gijón on a two-year deal.

Fraile scored his first professional goal on 1 September 2013, opening the 3–0 home victory over RCD Mallorca. On 27 January 2016, he terminated his contract with Sporting and agreed to a two-and-a-half-year deal at Elche CF the next day.

On 8 July 2017, following his team's relegation, Fraile joined third-tier club CF Fuenlabrada for one year. He achieved promotion in his second season as champions, then scored a career-best 13 times in the following for an eighth-place finish, ten of those coming from penalties.

Fraile signed with AD Alcorcón of the second division on 22 August 2020.
