= José Carlos (footballer, born 1996) =

Spanish footballer

Personal information
- Full name: José Carlos Ramírez Suárez
- Date of birth: 10 May 1996 (age 30)
- Place of birth: Paradas, Spain
- Height: 1.84 m (6 ft 0 in)
- Position: Centre back

Team information
- Current team: Recreativo
- Number: 6

Youth career
- 2001–2004: Paradas
- 2004–2007: Betis
- 2007–2010: Paradas
- 2010–2015: Betis

Senior career*
Years	Team	Apps	(Gls)
2014–2016	Betis B	61	(0)
2016–2018	Betis	6	(0)
2017–2018	→ Lorca (loan)	5	(0)
2017	→ Lorca B (loan)	1	(0)
2018	→ Lugo (loan)	6	(0)
2018–2020	Lugo	39	(1)
2020–2022	Alcorcón	38	(0)
2022–2024	San Fernando	66	(2)
2024–2025	Zamora	36	(2)
2025–	Recreativo	30	(0)

International career
2015	Spain U19	2	(0)
- * Club domestic league appearances and goals as of 7 May 2026

José Carlos Ramírez Suárez (born 10 May 1996), known as José Carlos, is a Spanish professional footballer who plays as a central defender for Segunda Federación club Recreativo.

== Club career ==
Born in Paradas, Seville, Andalusia, José Carlos joined Real Betis' youth setup in 2004, aged eight. In 2007, after being rarely used, he returned to his hometown and joined Paradas Balompié, returning to Betis only in 2010.

On 5 October 2014 José Carlos made his debut with the reserves, starting in a 0–2 Segunda División B home loss against UCAM Murcia CF. He became an undisputed starter for the side shortly after, contributing with 22 appearances during his first campaign.

On 4 April 2016, José Carlos renewed his contract until 2019. Promoted to the first team ahead of the 2016–17 season, he made his professional debut on 29 November by starting in a 1–0 Copa del Rey home win against Deportivo de La Coruña.

José Carlos made his La Liga debut on 4 December 2016, playing the full 90 minutes in a 3–3 home draw against Celta de Vigo. The following 8 August, he was loaned to Lorca FC, newly promoted to Segunda División, for one year.

On 31 January 2018, José Carlos was loaned to fellow second-tier club CD Lugo for six months, with a permanent contract agreed after the expiration of the loan deal. He scored his first professional goal on 19 October 2019, netting the opener in a 3–2 home win against SD Huesca.

On 4 August 2020, free agent José Carlos signed a two-year contract with AD Alcorcón, still in division two.

On 18 July 2024, he joined Zamora in the third tier.

== Honours ==
=== International ===
Spain U19

- UEFA European Under-19 Championship: 2015
