= Ernesto Gómez (footballer, born 1994) =

Spanish footballer

Ernesto
Personal information
- Full name: Ernesto Gómez Muñoz
- Date of birth: 18 July 1994 (age 32)
- Place of birth: Albolote, Spain
- Height: 1.70 m (5 ft 7 in)
- Position: Winger

Team information
- Current team: Persik Kediri
- Number: 7

Youth career
- 2008–2010: Granada
- 2010–2013: Málaga

Senior career*
| Years | Team | Apps | (Gls) |
| 2013–2015 | Málaga B | 28 | (2) |
| 2013–2014 | → San Fernando (loan) | 22 | (1) |
| 2015–2016 | Arroyo | 32 | (11) |
| 2016–2017 | Caudal | 26 | (1) |
| 2017–2019 | Oviedo B | 69 | (24) |
| 2019–2021 | Alcorcón | 60 | (4) |
| 2021–2022 | Burgos | 29 | (1) |
| 2022–2023 | Alcorcón | 31 | (4) |
| 2023–2025 | Ponferradina | 55 | (4) |
| 2025–2026 | Ibiza | 17 | (1) |
| 2026– | Persik Kediri | 23 | (7) |
- * Club domestic league appearances and goals as of 31 October 2026

Ernesto Gómes Muñoz (born 18 July 1994), simply known as Ernesto, is a Spanish footballer who plays for Super League club Persik Kediri. Mainly a left winger, he can also play as a forward.

== Club career ==
Born in Albolote, Granada, Andalusia, Ernesto represented Granada CF and Málaga CF as a youth. On 3 September 2013, after finishing his formation, he agreed to a one-year loan deal at Segunda División B side San Fernando CD.

Ernesto made his senior debut on 4 September 2013, playing the last three minutes in a 1–0 home win against Real Balompédica Linense, for the season's Copa del Rey. He scored his first senior goal on 30 November, netting the opener in a 1–3 loss at FC Cartagena, and featured regularly during the campaign as his team suffered relegation.

Ernesto returned to Málaga in July 2014, being assigned to the reserves in Tercera División, but moved to fellow league team Arroyo CP in the following year. On 17 August 2016, after scoring 11 goals for the latter side, he signed for Caudal Deportivo in the third division.

On 9 July 2017, Ernesto moved to another reserve team, Real Oviedo Vetusta in the fourth tier, helping in the club's promotion to the third division in his first campaign. In 2018–19, he was the side's top goalscorer with a career-best 15 goals.

On 7 July 2019, Ernesto agreed to a three-year deal with Segunda División side AD Alcorcón. He made his professional debut on 18 August, starting in a 1–0 away defeat of CD Numancia.

Ernesto scored his first professional goal on 17 September 2019, netting his team's third in a 3–0 home win against Cádiz CF through a penalty kick. On 29 June of the following year, he scored a brace in a 3–2 home success over Rayo Vallecano.

On 31 August 2021, Ernesto terminated his contract with Alkor, and signed for fellow second division side Burgos CF just hours later.
