= David Fernández (footballer, born 1985) =

Spanish footballer

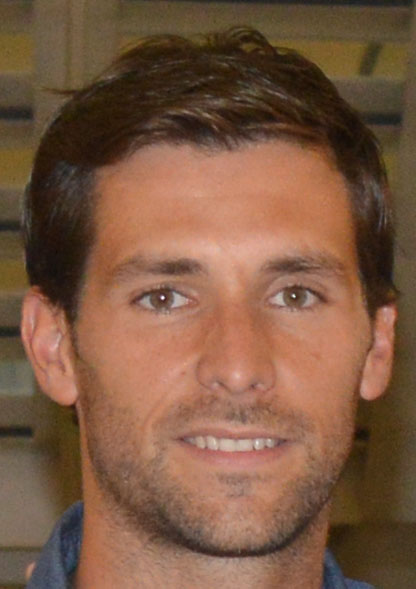
- Fernández in 2015

Personal information
- Full name: David Fernández Cortázar
- Date of birth: 6 April 1985 (age 41)
- Place of birth: Madrid, Spain
- Height: 1.86 m (6 ft 1 in)
- Position: Centre-back

Youth career
- Rayo Vallecano

Senior career*
Years	Team	Apps	(Gls)
2004–2006	Rayo Vallecano B		
2006–2008	Atlético Madrid B	59	(0)
2008–2009	Linares	26	(0)
2009–2012	Guadalajara	111	(0)
2012–2017	Oviedo	182	(4)
2017–2022	Alcorcón	190	(4)
2022–2023	Logroñés	31	(1)
Total		599	(9)
- * Club domestic league appearances and goals

David Fernández Cortázar (born 6 April 1985) is a Spanish former professional footballer who played as a central defender.

== Club career ==
Fernández was born in Madrid. He achieved Segunda División figures of 299 games and five goals, representing CD Guadalajara (one season), Real Oviedo (two) and AD Alcorcón (five).

In the 2014–15 campaign, Fernández and Oviedo were crowned Segunda División B champions. On 31 May 2015, he scored the only goal in the play-off finals away against Cádiz CF, with the club earning promotion to the professional leagues 12 years later.

Fernández retired in June 2023 aged 38, after one year in the Primera Federación with UD Logroñés.

== Honours ==
Oviedo

- Segunda División B: 2014–15
