= Juanma Bravo =

Spanish footballer

Personal information
- Full name: Juan Manuel Bravo Alcántara
- Date of birth: 10 February 1998 (age 28)
- Place of birth: Murcia, Spain
- Height: 1.88 m (6 ft 2 in)
- Position: Midfielder

Team information
- Current team: UCAM Murcia
- Number: 19

Youth career
- Atlético Cabezo de Torres
- Murcia

Senior career*
Years	Team	Apps	(Gls)
2015–2017	Murcia B	59	(4)
2017–2020	Murcia	70	(3)
2020–2024	Alcorcón	102	(5)
2024–2025	Ourense	21	(0)
2025–	UCAM Murcia	24	(1)
- * Club domestic league appearances and goals as of 15 May 2026

Juan Manuel "Juanma" Bravo Alcántara (born 10 February 1998) is a Spanish professional footballer who plays as a central midfielder for Segunda Federación club UCAM Murcia .

== Club career ==
Born in Cabezo de Torres, Murcia, Bravo joined Real Murcia's youth setup from CA Cabezo de Torres. Promoted to the reserves for the 2015–16 season, he made his senior debut on 30 August 2015 by starting in a 1–2 Tercera División home loss against CAP Ciudad de Murcia.

Bravo scored his first senior goal on 6 September 2015, netting his team's first in a 2–3 loss at EDMF Churra. On 24 March 2017, he renewed his contract until 2021.

Bravo made his first team debut on 9 April 2017, starting in a 3–1 home win against Atlético Mancha Real in the Segunda División B. His first goal in the main squad occurred on 24 February 2019, netting his team's only in a 1–2 loss at San Fernando CD.

On 1 September 2020, Bravo signed a four-year contract with Segunda División side AD Alcorcón. He made his professional debut on 13 September, coming on as a second-half substitute for fellow debutant Ander Gorostidi in a 0–0 away draw against CD Mirandés.
