= Álex Escardó =

Spanish footballer (born 1998)

Personal information
- Full name: Alejandro Escardó Llamas
- Date of birth: 6 June 1998 (age 28)
- Place of birth: Benalmádena, Spain
- Height: 1.76 m (5 ft 9 in)
- Position: Winger

Team information
- Current team: Numancia
- Number: 24

Youth career
- 2002–2007: Atlético Benamiel
- 2007–2017: Málaga

Senior career*
Years	Team	Apps	(Gls)
2017–2018	Málaga B	0	(0)
2017–2018	→ Écija (loan)	23	(2)
2018–2019	Betis B	10	(2)
2019–2020	El Palo	22	(13)
2020	El Ejido	0	(0)
2020–2022	Alcorcón	6	(0)
2021	→ Cultural Leonesa (loan)	10	(1)
2021–2022	→ Antequera (loan)	25	(4)
2022–2023	El Ejido	28	(11)
2023	Mérida	15	(1)
2024	Atlético Sanluqueño	9	(0)
2024–2025	Linares	30	(3)
2025–2026	Juventud Torremolinos	8	(0)
2026–	Numancia	7	(0)
- * Club domestic league appearances and goals as of 14 May 2026

Alejandro Escardó "Ale" Llamas, known as Álex Escardó (born 6 June 1998) is a Spanish footballer who plays as a left winger for Segunda Federación club Numancia.

== Club career ==
Born in Benalmádena, Málaga, Andalusia, Escardó joined Málaga CF's youth setup in 2007 at the age of nine, from Atlético Benamiel CF. On 11 August 2017, after finishing his formation, he was loaned to Segunda División B side Écija Balompié for the season.

Escardó made his senior debut on 26 August 2017, playing the last ten minutes and scoring the winner in a 2–1 home success over CD Badajoz. He returned to Málaga the following June after contributing with two goals in 24 appearances, but moved to Betis Deportivo Balompié in Tercera División on 31 August 2018.

On 16 August 2019, Escardó moved to El Palo FC, still in division four. On 2 July of the following year, he joined fellow league team CD El Ejido for the ensuing play-offs, and helped in their promotion by starting in both matches.

On 2 September 2020, Escardó signed for AD Alcorcón and was initially assigned to the B-team also in the fourth tier. He made his first team debut eleven days later, coming on as a late substitute for Samuel Sosa in a 0–0 away draw against CD Mirandés in the Segunda División championship.

On 1 February 2021, Escardó moved to third division side Cultural y Deportiva Leonesa on loan for the remainder of the season. On 22 July, he moved to Segunda División RFEF side Antequera CF, also in a temporary deal.

On 20 August 2024, he joined Linares in the fourth tier.
