= Íñigo García (footballer) =

Spanish footballer

Personal information
- Full name: Íñigo García Gómez
- Date of birth: 21 December 2004 (age 21)
- Place of birth: Madrid, Spain
- Position: Midfielder

Team information
- Current team: Unión Adarve

Youth career
- 2012–2018: Pozuelo de Alarcón
- 2018–2022: Unión Adarve
- 2022–2023: Alcorcón

Senior career*
| Years | Team | Apps | (Gls) |
| 2023–2025 | Alcorcón B | 43 | (2) |
| 2023–2024 | Alcorcón | 1 | (0) |
| 2025– | Unión Adarve | 10 | (0) |
- * Club domestic league appearances and goals as of 9 November 2025

Íñigo García Gómez (born 21 December 2004) is a Spanish footballer who plays mainly as a midfielder for Tercera Federación club Unión Adarve.

== Career ==
García played for the youth sides of CF Pozuelo de Alarcón and AD Unión Adarve before joining AD Alcorcón's youth categories in 2022. He made his senior debut with the latter's reserves on 11 March 2023, starting in a 2–2 Segunda Federación home draw against Gimnástica Segoviana CF.

García scored his first senior goal on 14 May 2023, netting the B's opener in a 1–1 home draw against CF Villanovense, as his side were already relegated. He made his first team debut on 1 November, starting in a 1–0 away win over CDA Navalcarnero, for the season's Copa del Rey.

García's professional debut occurred on 5 November 2023, as he came on as a second-half substitute for Yan Eteki in a 3–1 Segunda División home win over Racing de Santander.
