= Carlos Bellvís =

Spanish footballer

Personal information
- Full name: Carlos Bellvís Llorens
- Date of birth: 24 April 1985 (age 41)
- Place of birth: Valencia, Spain
- Height: 1.70 m (5 ft 7 in)
- Position: Wing-back

Youth career
- EMDA Alaquàs
- 2002–2003: Valencia

Senior career*
Years	Team	Apps	(Gls)
2003–2004	Valencia C		
2004–2009	Valencia B		
2006–2008	→ Elche (loan)	72	(4)
2008–2009	→ Numancia (loan)	28	(1)
2009–2011	Tenerife	29	(0)
2011–2014	Celta	35	(0)
2014	Ponferradina	17	(0)
2014–2022	Alcorcón	228	(4)
Total		409	(9)
- * Club domestic league appearances and goals

Carlos Bellvís Llorens (born 24 April 1985) is a Spanish former professional footballer. On the left flank, he played as either a defender or a midfielder.

== Club career ==
After emerging through local Valencia CF's youth system, Valencia-born Bellvís made his professional debut for Valencian Community neighbours Elche CF, playing two seasons on loan in the Segunda División. Subsequently, he moved in the same situation to CD Numancia, making his La Liga debut on 31 August 2008 in a shock 1–0 home win against FC Barcelona. He scored his only goal at that level on 16 November, closing the 4–3 away win over RCD Espanyol in injury time.

Bellvís cut all ties with Valencia after Numancia's relegation, and signed a three-year contract for CD Tenerife in July 2009. He suffered two consecutive relegations with the Canary Islands club, being only a backup in both seasons.

Having contributed 21 matches as his next team, RC Celta de Vigo, returned to the top flight at the end of the 2011–12 campaign as runners-up, Bellvís was only third or fourth choice in the following years, being deployed occasionally as a right-back and also suffering a fracture to his zygomatic bone in September 2013 during a match at Getafe CF, after a collision with Diego Castro. He left in January 2014 and resumed his career in the second tier, with SD Ponferradina and AD Alcorcón.
