= Víctor García (footballer, born June 1994) =

Venezuelan footballer

Personal information
- Full name: Víctor Hugo García Hernández
- Date of birth: 11 June 1994 (age 32)
- Place of birth: Cúa, Venezuela
- Height: 1.78 m (5 ft 10 in)
- Position: Right-back

Team information
- Current team: Huesca

Youth career
- San Antonio Cúa
- Real Esppor
- 2013: Porto

Senior career*
Years	Team	Apps	(Gls)
2010–2013	Real Esppor	35	(2)
2013–2016	Porto B	102	(0)
2014–2017	Porto	1	(0)
2016–2017	→ Nacional (loan)	22	(0)
2017–2020	Vitória Guimarães	23	(0)
2019	→ Famalicão (loan)	9	(0)
2020–2022	Alcorcón	39	(0)
2022–2023	Moreirense	3	(0)
2023–2026	Cultural Leonesa	89	(0)
2026–	Huesca	0	(0)

International career
2011	Venezuela U17	4	(1)
2013–2014	Venezuela U20	2	(0)
2011–2017	Venezuela	8	(0)
- * Club domestic league appearances and goals as of 31 May 2026

Víctor Hugo García Hernández (born 11 June 1994) is a Venezuelan professional footballer who plays as a right-back for Primera Federación club SD Huesca.

== Club career ==
=== Early years and Porto ===
Born in Cúa, Miranda, García spent three years in the Venezuelan Primera División with Real Esppor, being at the time the youngest player to appear for them in the competition. In early 2013, he signed with Portuguese club FC Porto to complete his development. He was mainly registered with the latter's reserves during his tenure, notably contributing 41 matches in the 2015–16 season as they won the LigaPro championship, being however ineligible for promotion.

García made his debut for Porto's first team on 13 April 2014, playing the full 90 minutes in a 3–1 Primeira Liga away win against S.C. Braga. For the 2016–17 campaign he was loaned to fellow top-flight side C.D. Nacional, featuring regularly but suffering relegation.

=== Vitória Guimarães ===
On 28 August 2017, García joined Vitória S.C. on a four-year contract. He played 13 matches in his first season in Minho, helping to a ninth-place finish.

García was loaned to second-tier team F.C. Famalicão on 21 January 2019.

=== Alcorcón ===
On 17 September 2020, García signed a two-year deal with AD Alcorcón of the Spanish Segunda División. He totalled 42 games during his spell, being relegated in 2022.

=== Moreirense ===
García returned to Portugal in August 2022, on a one-year contract at recently relegated club Moreirense FC. He featured rarely for the second-division champions, mainly due to injury.

=== Later career ===
On 8 August 2023, Primera Federación side Cultural y Deportiva Leonesa announced the free signing of García on a one-year contract, with an option for a further season. He totalled 95 appearances while achieving promotion at the end of the 2024–25 season, returning to the third tier in June 2026 with SD Huesca.

== International career ==
A former youth international, García won his first full cap for Venezuela on 10 August 2011 at the age of only 17, playing the last minutes of the 2–0 friendly loss to Honduras held in Fort Lauderdale, Florida.

== Honours ==
Porto B

- LigaPro: 2015–16

Moreirense

- Liga Portugal 2: 2022–23
