= Ander Gorostidi =

Spanish footballer (born 1996)

Personal information
- Full name: Ander Gorostidi García
- Date of birth: 23 February 1996 (age 30)
- Place of birth: San Sebastián, Spain
- Height: 1.85 m (6 ft 1 in)
- Position: Midfielder

Team information
- Current team: Huesca

Youth career
- Real Sociedad

Senior career*
Years	Team	Apps	(Gls)
2014–2016	Berio	66	(9)
2016–2020	Real Sociedad B	88	(11)
2020–2022	Alcorcón	43	(0)
2022–2025	Gimnàstic	95	(6)
2025–2026	Racing Ferrol	33	(0)
2026–	Huesca	0	(0)
- * Club domestic league appearances and goals as of 9 June 2026

Ander Gorostidi García (born 23 February 1996) is a Spanish footballer who plays as a central midfielder for SD Huesca.

== Club career ==
Gorostidi was born in San Sebastián, Gipuzkoa, Basque Country, and was a Real Sociedad youth graduate. In June 2014, he was promoted to farm team Berio FT in Tercera División, and made his senior debut during the season.

On 3 June 2016, Gorostidi was promoted to the reserves in Segunda División B. On 19 January 2018, he renewed his contract with the Txuri-urdin until 2021.

On 12 August 2020, Gorostidi signed a three-year deal with Segunda División side AD Alcorcón. He made his professional debut on 13 September, starting in a 0–0 away draw against CD Mirandés.

On 28 July 2022, after Alkor's relegation, Gorostidi signed a two-year contract with Gimnàstic de Tarragona in Primera Federación. On 3 July 2025, he moved to fellow league team Racing de Ferrol.

On 11 June 2026, Gorostidi agreed to a two-year deal with SD Huesca also in division three.
