= AD Alcorcón B =

Association football club in Spain

Alcorcón B
- Full name: Agrupación Deportiva Alcorcón, S.A.D. "B"
- Founded: 1998
- Ground: Campo Anexo de Santo Domingo, Alcorcón, Madrid, Spain
- Capacity: 1000
- President: Ignacio Legido
- Head coach: Jordi Condom Auli
- League: Primera Autonómica de Aficionados
- 2025–26: Tercera Federación – Group 7, 13th of 18 (relegated)
Home colours	Away colours

Agrupación Deportiva Alcorcón "B" is the reserve team of AD Alcorcón, was founded in 1998, and plays in Primera Autonómica de Aficionados, is based in Alcorcón, in the autonomous community of Madrid. Holding home matches at Campo Anexo de Santo Domingo, with a 1000-seat capacity.

== Season to season ==
Season	Tier	Division	Place
1998–99	8	3ª Reg.	2nd
1999–2000	7	2ª Reg.	3rd
2000–01	7	2ª Reg.	2nd
2001–02	6	1ª Reg.	10th
2002–03	6	1ª Reg.	3rd
2003–04	5	Reg. Pref.	9th
2004–05	5	Reg. Pref.	7th
2005–06	5	Reg. Pref.	8th
2006–07	5	Reg. Pref.	12th
2007–08	5	Reg. Pref.	9th
2008–09	5	Reg. Pref.	12th
2009–10	5	Pref.	16th
2010–11	6	1ª Afic.	2nd
2011–12	5	Pref.	3rd
2012–13	4	3ª	16th
2013–14	4	3ª	13th
2014–15	4	3ª	5th
2015–16	4	3ª	10th
2016–17	4	3ª	13th
2017–18	4	3ª	9th

Season	Tier	Division	Place
2018–19	4	3ª	12th
2019–20	4	3ª	3rd
2020–21	4	3ª	3rd / 5th
2021–22	5	3ª RFEF	4th
2022–23	4	2ª Fed.	15th
2023–24	5	3ª Fed.	8th
2024–25	5	3ª Fed.	9th
2025–26	5	3ª Fed.	13th
2026–27	6	1ª Aut.	

- 1 season in Segunda Federación
- 9 seasons in Tercera División
- 4 seasons in Tercera Federación/Tercera División RFEF

== Current squad ==
As of 1 October 2024.

Note: Flags indicate national team as defined under FIFA eligibility rules; some limited exceptions apply. Players may hold more than one non-FIFA nationality.

No.	Pos.	Nation	Player
1	GK	ESP	Angel Hernandez
2	DF	ESP	Marco Hernandez
3	DF	ESP	Bryan Osorio
4	DF	ESP	Héctor Criado
5	DF	QAT	Al Hashmi (on loan from Al-Arabi)
6	MF	ESP	Adrian
7	FW	ESP	Andres Garcia
8	MF	ESP	Edu Llorente
9	FW	ESP	David
10	FW	ESP	Arman
11	MF	ESP	Daniel
13	GK	ESP	Jack Evola
14	MF	ESP	Íñigo García
15	DF	ESP	Victor Pastor

No.	Pos.	Nation	Player
17	FW	ESP	Fernando
19	FW	ESP	Emilio Gutierrez
21	MF	RSA	Muhammad Carrim
22	MF	ESP	Ruben Exposito
23	DF	ESP	Samuel Rodriguez
24	MF	ESP	Cesar Sanchez
25	GK	ESP	Mert Demirci
28	FW	ESP	Alex Martin
30	FW	ESP	Nicola Dimenico

=== Current technical staff ===
Position	Staff
Head coach	(Spain) Jordi Condom Auli
Second coach	(Spain) Carlos Roldan
Assistant coach	(Spain) Daniel Suárez
Fitness coach	(Spain) Enrique Canadas
Goalkeeping coach	(Spain) Jorge Rodriguez
Match delegate	(Spain) Alvaro Cabrero
Physiotherapist	(Spain) Adrian Maña

Last updated: October 2024
Source: AD Alcorcón (in Spanish)
