= Estadio Municipal de Santo Domingo =

Football stadium in Madrid, Spain

Coordinates: 40°20′20″N 3°50′26″W

Santo Domingo
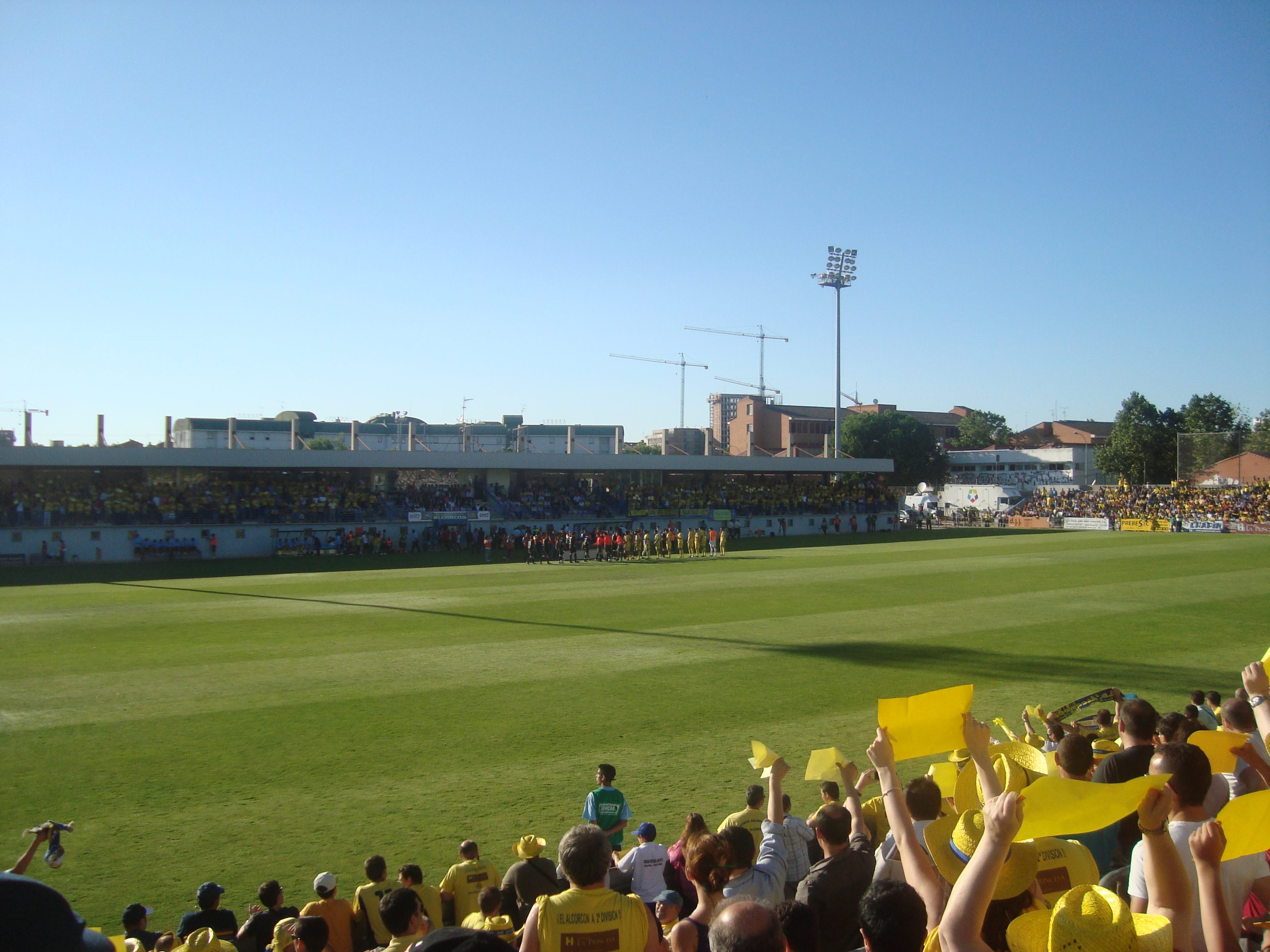
- Interactive map of Santo Domingo
- Location: Alcorcón, Community of Madrid, Spain
- Owner: Ayuntamiento de Alcorcón
- Capacity: 5,100
- Surface: Grass
- Field size: 105 m × 68 m (344 ft × 223 ft)

Construction
- Opened: 1999
- Expanded: 2014

Tenant
- AD Alcorcón

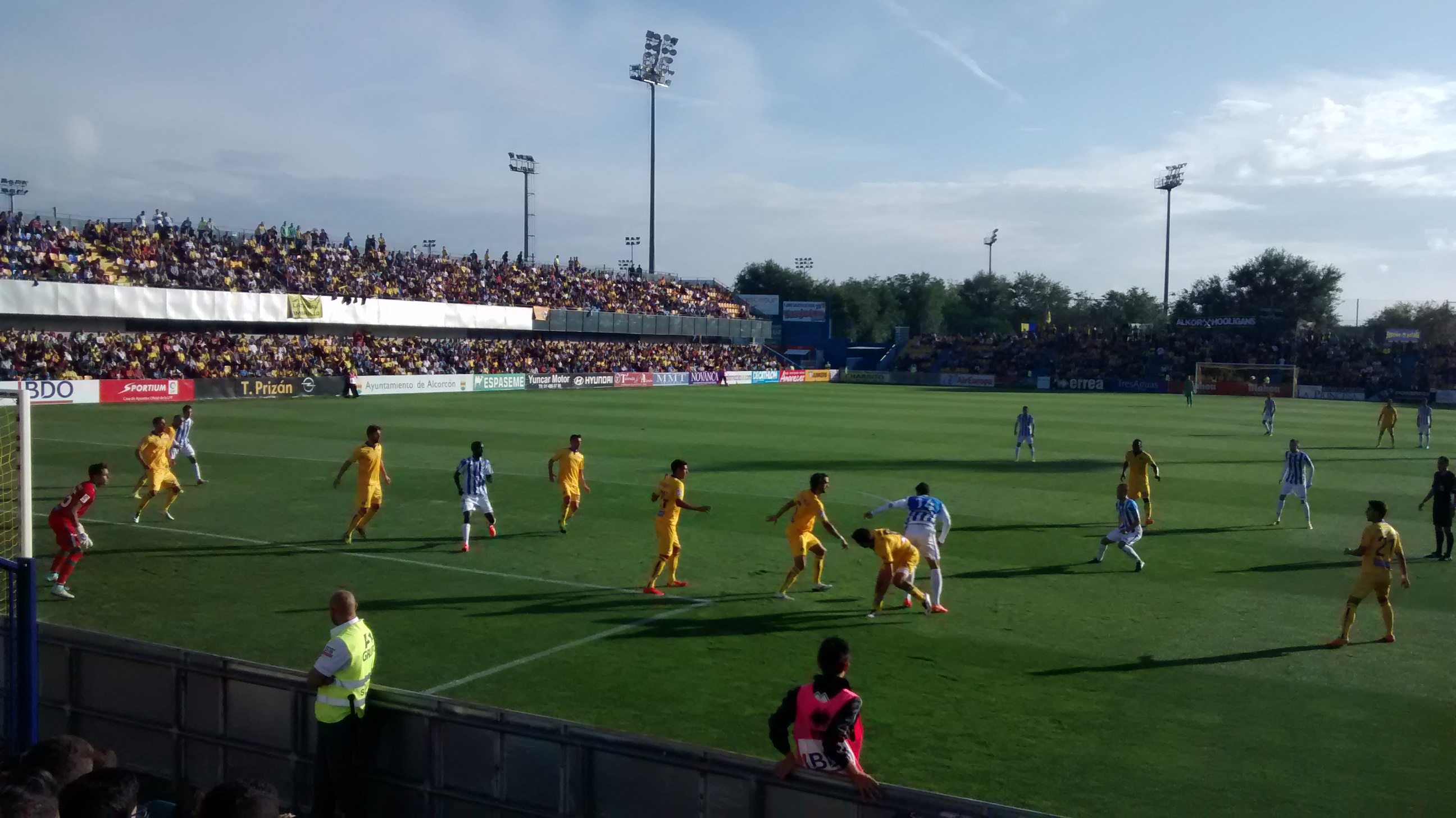
AD Alcorcón vs CD Leganés at the stadium

The Estadio Municipal de Santo Domingo is a football stadium located in Alcorcón, Community of Madrid, Spain. It is currently the home ground of AD Alcorcón. Owned and operated by the municipality, its first match dates from 19 May 1999, with the celebration of a friendly fixture with Real Madrid.
