= Jesús Ruiz (footballer) =

Spanish footballer (born 1997)

Personal information
- Full name: Jesús Ruiz Suárez
- Date of birth: 20 January 1997 (age 29)
- Place of birth: Esplugues de Llobregat, Spain
- Height: 1.85 m (6 ft 1 in)
- Position: Goalkeeper

Team information
- Current team: Mirandés
- Number: 1

Youth career
- Cornellà
- 2014–2016: Espanyol

Senior career*
Years	Team	Apps	(Gls)
2016–2017	Cornellà	3	(0)
2017–2019	Ibiza	10	(0)
2018–2019	→ Tarazona (loan)	37	(0)
2019–2020	Mallorca B	25	(0)
2020	Tarazona	0	(0)
2020–2024	Alcorcón	76	(0)
2024–2025	Racing Ferrol	35	(0)
2025–2026	Burgos	0	(0)
2026–	Mirandés	0	(0)
- * Club domestic league appearances and goals as of 25 June 2025

Jesús Ruiz Suárez (born 20 January 1997) is a Spanish footballer who plays as a goalkeeper for CD Mirandés.

== Club career ==
Born in Esplugues de Llobregat, Barcelona, Catalonia, Ruiz joined RCD Espanyol's youth setup in 2014, from UE Cornellà. On 25 June 2016, after finishing his formation, he returned to his previous club and was assigned to the main squad in Segunda División B.

Ruiz made his senior debut on 30 April 2017, starting in a 2–0 home win over CD Ebro. On 7 August, after being mainly used as a backup, he moved to Tercera División side UD Ibiza.

On 28 July 2018, after achieving promotion to the third level but again as a backup, Ruiz was loaned to SD Tarazona in the fourth division, for one year. He returned to Ibiza after being an undisputed starter for the club, and was transferred to RCD Mallorca on 18 July 2019; he was initially assigned to the reserves also in the fourth tier.

On 31 August 2020, Ruiz returned to Tarazona, with the club now in the third division, but left on 18 September to join AD Alcorcón, being initially a third-choice option behind Dani Jiménez and Samu Casado. He remained a third-choice behind Jiménez and José Aurelio Suárez for the 2021–22 campaign, but on 4 February 2022, after Jiménez left for CD Leganés and Suárez moved to Tokushima Vortis, he made his professional debut by starting in a 1–3 away loss against Burgos CF in the Segunda División.

On 2 July 2024, after Alkor's relegation, Ruiz signed for Racing de Ferrol also in the second division. On 1 September 2025, after another drop, he moved to Burgos CF on a one-year deal.

On 9 July 2026, after only featuring in cup matches, Ruiz moved to CD Mirandés, freshly relegated to Primera Federación.

== Career statistics ==
=== Club ===
As of match played 18 May 2025

Appearances and goals by club, season and competition
Club	Season	League			National Cup		Other		Total	
Club	Season	Division	Apps	Goals	Apps	Goals	Apps	Goals	Apps	Goals
Cornellà	2016–17	Segunda División B	3	0	0	0	—		3	0
Ibiza	2017–18	Tercera División	10	0	—		0	0	10	0
Tarazona (loan)	2018–19	Tercera División	37	0	—		6	0	43	0
Mallorca B	2019–20	Tercera División	25	0	—		2	0	27	0
Mallorca	2019–20	La Liga	0	0	0	0	—		0	0
Alcorcón	2020–21	Segunda División	0	0	0	0	—		0	0
Alcorcón	2021–22	Segunda División	14	0	0	0	—		14	0
Alcorcón	2022–23	Primera Federación	33	0	0	0	4	0	37	0
Alcorcón	2023–24	Segunda División	29	0	0	0	—		29	0
Alcorcón	Total		76	0	0	0	4	0	80	0
Racing Ferrol	2024–25	Segunda División	35	0	0	0	—		35	0
Career total			186	0	0	0	12	0	198	0
