= 2023–24 Copa del Rey =

Tournament details
- Country: Spain
- Date: 11 October 2023 – 6 April 2024
- Teams: 125

Final positions
- Champions: Athletic Bilbao (24th title)
- Runners-up: Mallorca

Tournament statistics
- Matches played: 126
- Goals scored: 362 (2.87 per match)
- Top goal scorer(s): Abdón; Anastasios Douvikas; Asier Villalibre (6 goals each)

The 2023–24 Copa del Rey was the 122nd edition of the Copa del Rey (including two seasons where two rival editions were played). The winners were assured a place in the 2024–25 UEFA Europa League league phase. Both the winners and the runners-up qualified for the four-team 2025 Supercopa de España.

Real Madrid were the defending champions, having beaten Osasuna in the final of the previous edition, but were eliminated in the round of 16 by Atlético Madrid.

The final was held at Estadio de La Cartuja in Seville on 6 April 2024, between Athletic Bilbao and Mallorca. Following a 1–1 draw, Athletic Bilbao won the match 4–2 on penalties, securing a 25th Copa del Rey title and their first since 1984.

As across Spain, match times up to 28 October 2023 and from 27 March 2024 were CEST (UTC+2). Times on interim ("winter") days were CET (UTC+1). Matches played in the Canary Islands used the WET (UTC±00:00).

== Schedule and format ==
In the summer of 2023, the RFEF released the calendar of the competition and confirmed the format of the previous season would remain.

| Round | Draw date | Date | Fixtures | Clubs | Format details |
|---|---|---|---|---|---|
| Preliminary round | 27 September 2023 | 11–12 October 2023 | 10 | 125 → 115 | New entries: Clubs qualified through the 2022–23 sixth tier. Opponents seeding: Teams faced each other according to proximity criteria. Local team seeding: Luck of the draw. Knock-out tournament type: Single match. |
| First round | 17 October 2023 | 31 October – 2 November 2023 | 55 | 115 → 60 | New entries: All qualified teams except for the four participants in the Supercopa de España and champions of the 2022–23 Primera Federación. Opponents seeding: Teams from lowest divisions face La Liga teams. Local team seeding: Matches were played at home stadiums of teams in lower divisions. Knock-out tournament type: Single match. |
| Second round | 15 November 2023 | 22 November and 5–7 December 2023 | 28 | 60 → 32 | New entries: 2022–23 Primera Federación champions entered at this stage. Opponents seeding: Teams from lowest divisions faced La Liga teams. Local team seeding: Matches were played at home stadiums of teams in lower divisions. Knock-out tournament type: Single match. |
| Round of 32 | 12 December 2023 | 6–8 January 2024 | 16 | 32 → 16 | New entries: Clubs participating in the Supercopa de España entered at this stage. Opponents seeding: Teams from lowest divisions faced La Liga teams. Local team seeding: Matches were played at home stadiums of teams in lower divisions. Knock-out tournament type: Single match. |
| Round of 16 | 8 January 2024 | 16–18 January 2024 | 8 | 16 → 8 | Opponents seeding: Teams from lowest divisions faced La Liga teams. Local team seeding: Matches were played at home stadiums of teams in lower divisions. Knock-out tournament type: Single match. |
| Quarter-finals | 19 January 2024 | 23–25 January 2024 | 4 | 8 → 4 | Opponents seeding: Luck of the draw. Local team seeding: Matches were played at home stadiums of teams in lower divisions. Knock-out tournament type: Single match. |
| Semi-finals | 26 January 2024 | 6–7 February 2024 | 2 | 4 → 2 | Opponents seeding: Luck of the draw. Local team seeding: Luck of the draw. Knock-out tournament type: Double match. |
| Semi-finals | 26 January 2024 | 27–29 February 2024 | 2 | 4 → 2 | Opponents seeding: Luck of the draw. Local team seeding: Luck of the draw. Knock-out tournament type: Double match. |
| Final | 26 January 2024 | 6 April 2024 | 1 | 2 → 1 | Single match at La Cartuja, Seville. Both teams qualified for the 2025 Supercopa de España. UEFA Europa League qualification: winners qualified for the 2024–25 UEFA Europa League league phase. |

Notes

- Matches ending in a draw were decided in extra time and, if still level, by a penalty shoot-out.

== Qualified teams ==
The following teams qualified for the competition. Reserve teams were not allowed to enter.

| La Liga; All 20 teams of the 2022–23 season | Segunda División; All 21 non-reserve teams of the 2022–23 season | Primera Federación; Top five non-reserve teams of the two groups of the 2022–23 season | Segunda Federación; Top five non-reserve teams of the five groups of the 2022–23 season | Tercera Federación; The best non-reserve teams plus the best seven non-reserve runners-up of each one of the eighteen groups of the 2022–23 season | Copa Federación; The four semi-finalists of the 2023 Copa Federación de España | Regional leagues The best non-promoted teams of the twenty groups of the sixth tier in the 2022–23 season |
| Almería; Athletic Bilbao; Atlético Madrid (Note: Atlético Madrid, Barcelona, Osasuna and Real Madrid joined the tournament in the round of 32 as participants of the Supercopa de España.); Barcelona; Cádiz; Celta Vigo; Elche; Espanyol; Getafe; Girona; Mallorca; Osasuna; Rayo Vallecano; Real Betis; Real Madrid^{TH}; Real Sociedad; Sevilla; Valencia; Villarreal; Valladolid | Alavés; Albacete; Andorra; Burgos; Cartagena; Eibar; Granada; Huesca; Ibiza; Las Palmas; Leganés; Levante; Lugo; Málaga; Mirandés; Oviedo; Ponferradina; Racing Santander; Sporting Gijón; Tenerife; Zaragoza | Alcorcón; Amorebieta (Note: Amorebieta joined the tournament in the second round as champions of the 2022–23 Primera Federación.); Castellón; Deportivo La Coruña; Eldense; Gimnàstic; Linares; Murcia; Racing Ferrol; Unionistas | Antequera; Arenteiro; Atlético Sanluqueño; Avilés; Cacereño; Compostela; Gernika; Gimnástica Segoviana; Guijuelo; Hércules; Manresa; Melilla; Navalcarnero; Peña Deportiva; Recreativo Huelva; Sestao River; Tarazona; Teruel; Terrassa; Tudelano; UCAM Murcia; Utebo; Villanovense; Yeclano; Zamora | Águilas; Andratx; Arandina; Arosa; Atlético Antoniano; Atlético Astorga; Atzeneta; Azuaga; Barakaldo; Barbastro; Cayón; Covadonga; Europa; Jaén; Llerenense; Lorca Deportiva; Manacor; Manchego; Marbella; Mensajero; Náxara; Orihuela; Ursaria; Valle de Egüés; Varea | Badalona Futur; San Roque Lepe; Talavera de la Reina; UD Logroñés | Atlético Lugones; Boiro; Buñol; Ceuta 6 de Junio; Chiclana; Deportivo Murcia; Hernán Cortés; Mijas-Las Lagunas; Melilla CD; Monte; Pradejón; Quintanar; Rotlet Molinar; Rubí; Santurtzi; Sauzal; Tardienta; Turégano; Unión Zona Norte; Zirauki |

== Preliminary round ==
=== Draw ===
Teams were divided into four groups according to geographical criteria.

| Group 1 | Group 2 | Group 3 | Group 4 |
|---|---|---|---|
| Atlético Lugones; Boiro; Monte; Pradejón; Santurtzi; Turégano | Rotlet Molinar; Rubí; Tardienta; Zirauki | Buñol; Ceuta 6 de Junio; Chiclana; Deportivo Murcia; Melilla CD; Mijas-Las Lagunas | Hernán Cortés; Quintanar; Sauzal; Unión Zona Norte |

=== Matches ===
| 11 October 2023 | Pradejón (6) | 1–2 | Atlético Lugones (6) | Pradejón |
| 19:30 | Cordón 40' | Report | Fernández 25'; Pibe 52' | Stadium: Municipal; Attendance: 800; Referee: Berrade Aísa (Navarre) |

| 11 October 2023 | Mijas-Las Lagunas (6) | 0–1 | Chiclana (6) | Mijas |
| 20:00 | | Report | Milano 57' (o.g.) | Stadium: Juan Gambero Culebra |

| 11 October 2023 | Ceuta 6 de Junio (6) | 0–3 | Buñol (6) | Ceuta |
| 21:00 | | Report | Cajas 2'; Valero 54'; Plá 88' | Stadium: José Martínez Pirri |

| 12 October 2023 | Hernán Cortés (6) | 3–1 | Sauzal (6) | Don Benito |
| 12:00 | Moruno 22', 29'; Márquez 54' | Report | Bethencourt 17' | Stadium: Municipal |

| 12 October 2023 | Turégano (6) | 3–1 | Santurtzi (6) | Turégano |
| 16:30 | Cotrina 40'; Guille Duque 50' (pen.); Miguel Pérez 83' | Report | Matey 47' | Stadium: El Burgo |

| 12 October 2023 | Tardienta (6) | 2–1 | Zirauki (7) | Tardienta |
| 17:00 | Fraile 4'; Mercadal 29' | Report | Ruiz de las Heras 56' (pen.) | Stadium: Santa Quiteria; Attendance: 725; Referee: Martínez Alonso |

| 12 October 2023 | Rubí (6) | 0–0 (a.e.t.) (4–2 p) | Rotlet Molinar (6) | Rubí |
| 17:00 | | Report | | Stadium: Can Rosés; Referee: Mihaita Marius Haghiac |
| | Penalties |
| | Hervías (penalty scored); Morell (penalty scored); Muela (penalty scored); Rafa Leva (penalty scored) | | Gori (penalty scored); Pons (penalty scored) |

| 12 October 2023 | Monte (6) | 0–1 | Boiro (6) | Santander |
| 17:30 | | Report | Carril 39' | Stadium: Monte 1 |

| 12 October 2023 | Melilla CD (6) | 1–3 | Deportivo Murcia (7) | Melilla |
| 17:30 | González 51' | Report | Minguela 9'; Soto 23'; Adri Lorenzo 77' | Stadium: La Espiguera |

| 12 October 2023 | Quintanar (6) | 1–0 | Unión Zona Norte (6) | Quintanar de la Orden |
| 17:30 | Joselu 13' | Report | | Stadium: Los Molinos |

== First round ==
The first round was played by 110 of the 115 qualified teams, with the exceptions being the four participants of the 2024 Supercopa de España, and the Primera RFEF champions. The ten winners from the previous preliminary round were paired with ten teams from La Liga. The four Copa Federación semi-finalists were drawn with the other four teams from La Liga, and the last two La Liga teams were drawn with two teams from the Tercera RFEF. The last six teams from the Tercera RFEF were paired with six teams from the Segunda División. The last fourteen teams from Segunda División were paired with fourteen teams from the Segunda RFEF. Then, eighteen teams from the Segunda RFEF were paired with the eighteen teams from the Primera RFEF. Finally, two teams from Segunda RFEF were paired each other.

A total of 55 matches were played between 31 October and 2 November 2023, as well as two postponed matches on 8 and 14 November, respectively.

=== Draw ===
The draw for the first round was held on 17 October 2023. Teams were divided into seven pots.

| Pot 1; 16 teams of La Liga | Pot 2; 20 teams of Segunda División | Pot 3; 18 teams of Primera Federación | Pot 4; 34 teams of Segunda Federación | Pot 5; 8 teams of Tercera Federación | Pot 6; 4 teams qualified through the Copa Federación | Pot 7; 10 winners of the preliminary round |
| Alavés; Almería; Athletic Bilbao; Cádiz; Celta Vigo; Getafe; Girona; Granada; Las Palmas; Mallorca; Rayo Vallecano; Real Betis; Real Sociedad; Sevilla; Valencia; Villarreal | Albacete; Alcorcón; Andorra; Burgos; Cartagena; Eibar; Elche; Eldense; Espanyol; Huesca; Leganés; Levante; Mirandés; Oviedo; Racing Ferrol; Racing Santander; Sporting Gijón; Tenerife; Valladolid; Zaragoza | Antequera; Arenteiro; Atlético Sanluqueño; Castellón; Deportivo La Coruña; Gimnàstic; Ibiza; Linares; Lugo; Málaga; Melilla; Murcia; Ponferradina; Recreativo Huelva; Sestao River; Tarazona; Teruel; Unionistas | Águilas; Andratx; Arandina; Atlético Antoniano; Avilés; Barakaldo; Barbastro; Cacereño; Cayón; Compostela; Covadonga; Europa; Gernika; Gimnástica Segoviana; Guijuelo; Hércules; Llerenense; Manchego; Manresa; Marbella; Mensajero; Navalcarnero; Náxara; Orihuela; Peña Deportiva; Terrassa; Tudelano; UCAM Murcia; Ursaria; Utebo; Valle de Egüés; Villanovense; Yeclano; Zamora | Arosa; Atlético Astorga; Atzeneta; Azuaga; Jaén; Lorca Deportiva; Manacor; Varea | Badalona Futur; San Roque Lepe; Talavera de la Reina; UD Logroñés | Atlético Lugones; Boiro; Buñol; Chiclana; Deportivo Murcia; Hernán Cortés; Quintanar; Rubí; Tardienta; Turégano |

=== Matches ===
| 31 October 2023 | Mensajero (4) | 0–2 | Espanyol (2) | Santa Cruz |
| 19:00 WET | | Report | Salvi 36', 38' | Stadium: Silvestre Carrillo; Referee: Manuel Jesús Orellana Cid |

| 31 October 2023 | Varea (5) | 0–3 | Levante (2) | Logroño (Note: Varea did not play the match in their main stadium Municipal de Varea, Varea, as it did not meet the broadcasting requirements.) |
| 20:00 | | Report | Álvarez 51'; Rober 60'; Gómez 77' | Stadium: Las Gaunas; Referee: Jon Ander González Esteban |

| 31 October 2023 | Cacereño (4) | 2–3 (a.e.t.) | Castellón (3) | Cáceres |
| 20:45 | Fernández 22'; Lolo 95' (pen.) | Report | Suero 56'; Traoré 101'; Grønning 103' | Stadium: Príncipe Felipe; Attendance: 2,389; Referee: Daniel Palencia Caballero |

| 31 October 2023 | Talavera de la Reina (4) | 0–2 | Almería (1) | Talavera de la Reina |
| 21:00 | | Report | Ramazani 14'; Milovanović 45' | Stadium: El Prado; Attendance: 3,118; Referee: Mateo Busquets Ferrer |

| 31 October 2023 | Manacor (5) | 0–3 | Las Palmas (1) | Manacor |
| 21:00 | | Report | Araujo 68'; Moleiro 76'; Ferrer 86' | Stadium: Na Capellera; Attendance: 2,600; Referee: Jorge Figueroa Vázquez |

| 31 October 2023 | Lorca Deportiva (5) | 0–4 | Eibar (2) | Lorca |
| 21:00 | | Report | Troncho 68'; De la Fuente 80'; Aketxe 83', 90' (pen.) | Stadium: Francisco Artés Carrasco; Referee: Iván Caparrós Hernández |

| 1 November 2023 | Atlético Lugones (6) | 0–6 | Rayo Vallecano (1) | Lugones |
| 12:00 | | Report | Falcao 8' (pen.), 16'; Camello 40'; Bebé 62', 79'; Rațiu 68' | Stadium: Santa Bárbara; Attendance: 1,800; Referee: Alejandro Muñiz Ruiz |

| 1 November 2023 | San Roque Lepe (4) | 1–2 | Girona (1) | Lepe |
| 12:00 | Mizzian 51' | Report | Valery 48'; Sávio 90+8' | Stadium: Ciudad de Lepe; Attendance: 3,000; Referee: Francisco José Hernández Maeso |

| 1 November 2023 | Badalona Futur (4) | 0–0 (a.e.t.) (2–4 p) | Cádiz (1) | Vic |
| 12:00 | | Report | | Stadium: Estadi ZEM Hipòlit Planàs; Attendance: 3,770; Referee: Miguel Ángel Ortiz Arias |
| | Penalties |
| | Peque (penalty scored); Thior (penalty missed); Navarro (penalty scored); Xiker (penalty missed) | | (penalty scored) Gómez; (penalty scored) Navarro; (penalty scored) Kouamé; (penalty scored) Lucas Pires |

| 1 November 2023 | Azuaga (5) | 0–0 (a.e.t.) (2–3 p) | Cartagena (2) | Azuaga |
| 12:00 | | Report | | Stadium: Municipal; Referee: Dámaso Arcediano Monescillo |
| | Penalties |
| | Gabi (penalty scored); López (penalty missed); Vaca (penalty scored); Opara (penalty missed); Sánchez (penalty missed); Domínguez (penalty missed) | | (penalty missed) Ferreiro; (penalty missed) Muñoz; (penalty scored) Fontán; (penalty missed) Musto; (penalty scored) Ortuño; (penalty scored) Gonzalo |

| 1 November 2023 | Peña Deportiva (4) | 1–5 | Valladolid (2) | Santa Eulària |
| 12:00 | Tovar 84' | Report | Meseguer 17', 69', 71'; De la Hoz 50'; Quintana 78' | Stadium: Estadio Municipal; Attendance: 2,000; Referee: Rubén Ávalos Barrera |

| 1 November 2023 | Navalcarnero (4) | 0–1 | Alcorcón (2) | Navalcarnero |
| 12:00 | | Report | Lara 21' | Stadium: Mariano González; Referee: Luis Mario Milla Alvendiz |

| 1 November 2023 | Llerenense (4) | 0–2 | Leganés (2) | Don Benito (Note: Llerenense did not play the match in their main stadium Fernando Robina, Llerena, as it did not meet the broadcasting requirements.) |
| 12:00 | | Report | Nyom 9'; Aguilar 61' | Stadium: Vicente Sanz; Referee: Óliver de la Fuente Ramos |

| 1 November 2023 | Compostela (4) | 0–1 | Tenerife (2) | Santiago de Compostela |
| 12:00 | | Report | Ángel 10' | Stadium: San Lázaro; Attendance: 2,503; Referee: Germán Cid Camacho |

| 1 November 2023 | Náxara (4) | 1–2 | Melilla (3) | Nájera |
| 12:00 | Lorá 90+1' | Report | González 1'; García 49' | Stadium: La Salera; Attendance: 1,114; Referee: Pablo Monterrubio Torres |

| 1 November 2023 | Barbastro (4) | 1–0 | Ponferradina (3) | Barbastro |
| 12:00 | De Mesa 44' | Report | | Stadium: Municipal de Deportes; Referee: Pol Gòdia Solé |

| 1 November 2023 | UCAM Murcia (4) | 0–0 (a.e.t.) (6–7 p) | Linares (3) | Murcia |
| 12:00 | | Report | | Stadium: La Condomina; Attendance: 1,460; Referee: David Cambronero González |
| | Penalties |
| | Ramis (penalty scored); Yasser (penalty scored); Arturo (penalty scored); Chinchilla (penalty missed); Ramírez (penalty scored); Sánchez (penalty scored); Alonso (penalty scored); Pérez (penalty missed) | | (penalty scored) Moreno; (penalty scored) Llorente; (penalty scored) Varela; (penalty missed) Suárez; (penalty scored) Díaz; (penalty scored) Oyón; (penalty scored) Molina; (penalty scored) Rentero |

| 1 November 2023 | Quintanar (6) | 0–3 | Sevilla (1) | Quintanar de la Orden |
| 15:30 | | Report | Mir 22'; En-Nesyri 40'; Pedrosa 90+2' | Stadium: Alfonso Viller García; Attendance: 4,500; Referee: Juan Martínez Munuera |

| 1 November 2023 | Turégano (6) | 0–4 | Celta Vigo (1) | Segovia (Note: Turégano did not play the match in their main stadium El Burgo, Turégano, as it did not meet the broadcasting requirements.) |
| 15:30 | | Report | Bamba 12', 33'; Pérez 61', 71' | Stadium: La Albuera; Attendance: 2,200; Referee: Mario Melero López |

| 1 November 2023 | Atlético Astorga (5) | 1–0 | Andorra (2) | Astorga |
| 16:00 | Vales 22' | Report | | Stadium: La Eragudina; Attendance: 1,000; Referee: Álvaro Moreno Aragón |

| 1 November 2023 | Valle de Egüés (4) | 1–0 (a.e.t.) | Teruel (3) | Aranguren (Note: Valle de Egüés did not play the match in their main stadium Sarriguren, Egüés, as it did not meet the broadcasting requirements.) |
| 16:00 | Díaz 110' (pen.) | Report | | Stadium: Estadio Valle Araguren; Referee: Fernando Román Román |

| 1 November 2023 | Atlético Antoniano (4) | 0–1 | Lugo (3) | Lebrija |
| 16:00 | | Report | Antonetti 80' | Stadium: Municipal de Lebrija; Referee: Álvaro Rodríguez Recio |

| 1 November 2023 | Jaén (5) | 2–3 | Eldense (2) | Jaén |
| 16:30 | Triviño 24'; Martos 62' | Report | Marí 45+1'; Poloni 87'; Ortuño 90+1' (pen.) | Stadium: Nuevo La Victoria; Attendance: 12,569; Referee: Rafael Sánchez López |

| 1 November 2023 | Avilés (4) | 0–1 | Arenteiro (3) | Avilés |
| 16:30 | | Report | Marquitos 32' | Stadium: Román Suárez Puerta; Attendance: 1,243; Referee: José Alberto Pardeiro Puente |

| 1 November 2023 | Covadonga (4) | 1–3 (a.e.t.) | Deportivo La Coruña (3) | Langreo (Note: Covadonga did not play the match in their main stadium Juan Antonio Álvarez Rabanal, Oviedo, as it did not meet the broadcasting requirements.) |
| 17:00 | Fernández 32' | Report | Vázquez 89'; Pérez 115'; Mella 117' | Stadium: Estadio Ganzábal; Attendance: 2,500; Referee: Imanol Irurtzun Artola |

| 1 November 2023 | Ursaria (4) | 1–2 | Cayón (4) | Cobeña |
| 17:00 | Díaz 29' | Report | Sanz 22'; Alonso 72' | Stadium: La Dehesa; Attendance: 300; Referee: Fernando Moreno Osuna |

| 1 November 2023 | Guijuelo (4) | 0–3 | Sporting Gijón (2) | Guijuelo |
| 17:30 | | Report | Mateo 59' (o.g.); Hassan 67'; Fernández 86' | Stadium: Estadio Municipal; Referee: José Antonio López Toca |

| 1 November 2023 | Zamora (4) | 2–2 (a.e.t.) (4–3 p) | Racing Santander (2) | Zamora |
| 17:30 | Luismi 45+1'; Ramos 120+2' | Report | Martín 90+3'; Peque 108' (pen.) | Stadium: Ruta de la Plata; Attendance: 3,405; Referee: Miguel González Díaz |
| | Penalties |
| | Ramos (penalty scored); Camacho (penalty scored); García (penalty scored); Etxaburu (penalty scored) | | (penalty missed) Vicente; (penalty scored) Grenier; (penalty scored) Morante; (penalty scored) Martín; (penalty missed) Peque |

| 1 November 2023 | Manchego (4) | 1–3 | Antequera (3) | Ciudad Real |
| 17:30 | Jiménez 61' | Report | Chema 44'; Marín 51', 59' | Stadium: Rey Juan Carlos I Referee: Jorge Díaz Escudero |

| 1 November 2023 | Arandina (4) | 1–0 | Murcia (3) | Aranda de Duero |
| 17:30 | El Battioui 43' | Report | | Stadium: El Montecillo; Referee: Guillermo Conejero Sánchez |

| 1 November 2023 | Terrassa (4) | 1–0 | Albacete (2) | Terrassa |
| 18:00 | Cano 49' | Report | | Stadium: Estadi Olímpic; Referee: Andrés Fuentes Molina |

| 1 November 2023 | Utebo (4) | 1–2 (a.e.t.) | Mirandés (2) | Utebo |
| 18:00 | Moreno 42' (o.g.) | Report | Tomeo 53'; Durdov 94' | Stadium: Santa Ana; Referee: Adrián Cordero Vega |

| 1 November 2023 | Europa (4) | 0–2 | Elche (2) | Barcelona |
| 18:00 | | Report | Mourad 43'; Mendoza 82' | Stadium: Nou Sardenya; Attendance: 4,032; Referee: Salvador Lax Franco |

| 1 November 2023 | Barakaldo (4) | 0–0 (a.e.t.) (2–4 p) | Málaga (3) | Barakaldo |
| 18:00 | | Report | | Stadium: Lasesarre; Attendance: 7,600; Referee: Manuel Pozueta Rodríguez |
| | Penalties |
| | Salado (penalty scored); Torre (penalty scored); Artetxe (penalty missed); Vélez (penalty missed) | | (penalty scored) Cordero; (penalty missed) Dioni; (penalty scored) Roberto; (penalty scored) Juanpe; (penalty scored) Lorenzo |

| 1 November 2023 | Tudelano (4) | 1–0 (a.e.t.) | Recreativo Huelva (3) | Tudela |
| 18:00 | Martínez 106' | Report | | Stadium: Ciudad de Tudela; Referee: Sergio Usón Rosel |

| 1 November 2023 | Gernika (4) | 0–2 | Unionistas (3) | Gernika |
| 18:00 | | Report | Losada 70'; Planas 73' | Stadium: Urbieta; Referee: Alejandro Morilla Turrión |

| 1 November 2023 | Yeclano (4) | 2–0 (a.e.t.) | Atlético Sanluqueño (3) | Yecla |
| 18:00 | Serpeta 114', 122' | Report | | Stadium: La Constitución; Referee: Francisco José Ortega Herrera |

| 1 November 2023 | Orihuela (4) | 0–0 (a.e.t.) (6–5 p) | Gimnàstic (3) | Orihuela |
| 18:00 | | Report | | Stadium: Los Arcos; Referee: Juan Antonio Manrique Antequera |
| | Penalties |
| | Pallarés (penalty scored); Martínez (penalty missed); Mpie (penalty scored); Ortiz (penalty scored); Callejón (penalty scored); Sirera (penalty scored); Mendinueta (penalty scored) | | (penalty scored) Oriol; (penalty missed) Montalvo; (penalty scored) Sanz; (penalty scored) Concha; (penalty scored) Fernández; (penalty scored) Trigueros; (penalty missed) Escudero |

| 1 November 2023 | Tardienta (6) | 0–12 | Getafe (1) | Huesca (Note: Tardienta did not play the match in their main stadium Santa Quiteria, Tardienta, as it did not meet the broadcasting requirements.) |
| 18:30 | | Report | Patrick 7'; Greenwood 15', 54'; Lozano 30'; Martín 33'; Óscar 35', 56', 63'; Duarte 68'; Latasa 73'; Mayoral 78', 85' | Stadium: El Alcoraz; Attendance: 1,200; Referee: Víctor García Verdura |

| 1 November 2023 | Buñol (6) | 0–1 | Real Sociedad (1) | Requena (Note: Buñol did not play the match in their main stadium Beltrán Báguena, Buñol, as it did not meet the broadcasting requirements.) |
| 18:30 | | Report | Fernández 67' | Stadium: Tomás Berlanga; Attendance: 4,000; Referee: Guillermo Cuadra Fernández |

| 1 November 2023 | Boiro (6) | 0–4 | Mallorca (1) | Boiro |
| 18:30 | | Report | Abdón 25', 33' (pen.), 76' (pen.); Larin 46' | Stadium: Barraña; Referee: Javier Alberola Rojas |

| 1 November 2023 | Águilas (4) | 0–1 | Huesca (2) | Águilas |
| 19:00 | | Report | Nieto 25' | Stadium: El Rubial; Referee: Saúl Ais Reig |

| 1 November 2023 | Andratx (4) | 3–2 (a.e.t.) | Tarazona (3) | Andratx |
| 19:30 | Castedo 15'; Fernández 92'; Garrido 102' | Report | Errahaly 28'; Cano 70' | Stadium: Sa Plana; Attendance: 1,200; Referee: Sergiu Claudiu Muresan |

| 1 November 2023 | Marbella (4) | 1–3 (a.e.t.) | Racing Ferrol (2) | Marbella |
| 20:00 | Marco Túlio 71' | Report | Merino 43'; Giménez 103', 116' | Stadium: Estadio Municipal de Marbella; Attendance: 1,000; Referee: Daniel Jesús Trujillo Suárez |

| 1 November 2023 | Manresa (4) | 1–2 (a.e.t.) | Oviedo (2) | Manresa |
| 20:00 | Baquero 24' | Report | Masca 3', 112' | Stadium: Nou Estadi Municipal Congost; Attendance: 3,117; Referee: Iosu Galech Apezteguía |

| 1 November 2023 | Hernán Cortés (6) | 1–12 | Real Betis (1) | Almendralejo (Note: Hernán Cortés did not play the match in their main stadium Municipal, Hernán Cortés, Don Benito, as it did not meet the broadcasting requirements.) |
| 20:30 | Márquez 55' | Report | Rodri 4', 20', 37'; Willian José 6', 33', 40', 43'; Luiz Henrique 9'; Ezzalzouli 16', 50'; Roca 86' (pen.); Diao 90' | Stadium: Francisco de la Hera; Attendance: 11,580; Referee: Isidro Díaz de Mera Escuderos |

| 1 November 2023 | Rubí (6) | 1–2 | Athletic Bilbao (1) | Rubí |
| 21:30 | Rodríguez 86' | Report | Ares 50', 57' | Stadium: Can Rosés; Attendance: 4,000; Referee: César Soto Grado |

| 2 November 2023 | Chiclana (6) | 0–5 | Villarreal (1) | Chiclana de la Frontera |
| 19:00 | | Report | Trigueros 19', 43', 72' (pen.); Pascual 31'; Baena 74' | Stadium: Estadio Municipal; Attendance: 5,520; Referee: Juan Luis Pulido Santana |

| 2 November 2023 | Arosa (5) | 3–0 (awd.) (Note: Arosa were awarded a 3–0 win after Granada fielded ineligible player Adri López during the match. Granada originally won the match 3–0.) | Granada (1) | Vilagarcía de Arousa |
| 19:00 | | Report | Callejón 19'; Weissman 88'; Diédhiou 90' | Stadium: A Lomba; Attendance: 3,100; Referee: Ricardo de Burgos Bengoetxea |

| 2 November 2023 | UD Logroñés (4) | 0–2 | Valencia (1) | Logroño |
| 20:00 | | Report | Gozálbez 45+1'; López 88' | Stadium: Las Gaunas; Attendance: 8,010; Referee: Javier Iglesias Villanueva |

| 2 November 2023 | Hércules (4) | 1–2 | Burgos (2) | Alicante |
| 20:30 | Grego 35' (o.g.) | Report | Niño 19'; López-Pinto 51' | Stadium: José Rico Pérez; Attendance: 8,567; Referee: Raúl Martín González Francés |

| 2 November 2023 | Villanovense (4) | 2–1 | Ibiza (3) | Villanueva de la Serena |
| 20:30 | González 62'; Bermúdez 67' | Report | Obolskiy 42' | Stadium: Estadio Romero Cuerda; Referee: Abraham Domínguez Cervantes |

| 2 November 2023 | Deportivo Murcia (7) | 0–10 | Alavés (1) | Murcia |
| 21:00 | | Report | Abde 7', 38'; Duarte 13'; Alkain 52', 60'; Hagi 63', 80'; Karrikaburu 68', 75', 89' | Stadium: Nueva Condomina (Note: Deportivo Murcia did not play the match in their main stadium Campo Municipal José Manuel Aroca, as it did not meet the broadcasting requirements.); Attendance: 2,500; Referee: José Luis Munuera Montero |

| 8 November 2023 | Gimnástica Segoviana (4) | 3–4 (a.e.t.) | Sestao River (3) | Segovia |
| 18:00 | Silva 12'; Segovia 90+3'; Díaz 90+7' | Report | L. Martínez 38'; Cabo 52', 98'; Gutiérrez 73' | Stadium: La Albuera; Attendance: 6,000; Referee: Alexandre Alemán Pérez |

| 14 November 2023 | Atzeneta (5) | 2–1 | Zaragoza (2) | Ontinyent (Note: Atzeneta did not play the match in their main stadium El Regit, Atzeneta, as it did not meet the broadcasting requirements.) |
| 20:00 | Yarce 24'; Uclés 69' | Report | Mollejo 21' | Stadium: El Clariano; Attendance: 2,100; Referee: José Luis Guzmán Mansilla |

== Second round ==
The second round was played by 56 teams, with the four participants of the 2023–24 Supercopa de España having a bye. The Primera RFEF champions entered in this round. The three Tercera RFEF teams were paired with three teams from La Liga. The eleven Segunda RFEF teams were drawn with eleven teams from La Liga, and the last La Liga team were drawn with one team from the Primera RFEF. The last nine teams from the Primera RFEF were paired with nine teams from the Segunda División. Finally, eight teams from Segunda División were paired each other.

A total of 28 matches were played between 22 November and 7 December 2023.

=== Draw ===
The draw for the second round was held on 15 November 2023. Teams were divided into five pots.

| Pot 1; 15 teams of La Liga | Pot 2; 17 teams of Segunda División | Pot 3; 10 teams of Primera Federación | Pot 4; 11 teams of Segunda Federación | Pot 5; 3 teams of Tercera Federación |
| Alavés; Almería; Athletic Bilbao; Cádiz; Celta Vigo; Getafe; Girona; Las Palmas; Mallorca; Rayo Vallecano; Real Betis; Real Sociedad; Sevilla; Valencia; Villarreal | Alcorcón; Amorebieta; Burgos; Cartagena; Eibar; Elche; Eldense; Espanyol; Huesca; Leganés; Levante; Mirandés; Oviedo; Racing Ferrol; Sporting Gijón; Tenerife; Valladolid | Arenteiro; Antequera; Castellón; Deportivo La Coruña; Linares; Lugo; Málaga; Melilla; Sestao River; Unionistas | Andratx; Arandina; Barbastro; Cayón; Orihuela; Terrassa; Tudelano; Valle de Egüés; Villanovense; Yeclano; Zamora | Arosa; Atlético Astorga; Atzeneta |

=== Matches ===
| 22 November 2023 | Zamora (4) | 1–2 (a.e.t.) | Villarreal (1) | Zamora |
| 21:00 | Etxaburu 49' | Report | Morales 88', 96' | Stadium: Ruta de la Plata; Attendance: 4,600; Referee: Miguel Ángel Ortiz Arias |

| 5 December 2023 | Atzeneta (5) | 1–2 | Getafe (1) | Ontinyent (Note: Atzeneta did not play the match in their main stadium El Regit, Atzeneta, as it did not meet the broadcasting requirements.) |
| 19:00 | Seguí 56' | Report | Latasa 53', 74' | Stadium: El Clariano; Attendance: 5,000; Referee: José Luis Munuera Montero |

| 5 December 2023 | Arosa (5) | 0–1 | Valencia (1) | Vilagarcía de Arousa |
| 21:00 | | Report | Yaremchuk 8' | Stadium: A Lomba; Attendance: 4,253; Referee: Isidro Díaz de Mera Escuderos |

| 5 December 2023 | Espanyol (2) | 3–1 | Valladolid (2) | Cornellà de Llobregat |
| 21:00 | Carreras 24', 43'; Puado 90+6' | Report | Salazar 82' | Stadium: Stage Front Stadium; Attendance: 15,464; Referee: Salvador Lax Franco |

| 5 December 2023 | Castellón (3) | 2–1 | Oviedo (2) | Castellón de la Plana |
| 21:00 | Suero 40'; Grønning 49' | Report | Alemão 56' | Stadium: Nou Estadi Castàlia; Attendance: 11,258; Referee: Óliver de la Fuente Ramos |

| 6 December 2023 | Barbastro (4) | 1–0 | Almería (1) | Barbastro |
| 12:00 | Carbonell 28' | Report | | Stadium: Municipal de Deportes; Attendance: 3,000; Referee: Víctor García Verdura |

| 6 December 2023 | Yeclano (4) | 0–2 | Rayo Vallecano (1) | Yecla |
| 12:00 | | Report | Falcao 89'; De Tomás 90+4' | Stadium: La Constitución; Attendance: 4,700; Referee: Mario Melero López |

| 6 December 2023 | Antequera (3) | 0–2 | Huesca (2) | Antequera |
| 12:00 | | Report | Lombardo 36'; Kortajarena 90+6' | Stadium: El Maulí; Attendance: 2,590; Referee: Dámaso Arcediano Monescillo |

| 6 December 2023 | Deportivo La Coruña (3) | 2–3 (a.e.t.) | Tenerife (2) | A Coruña |
| 12:00 | Mella 10'; Sánchez 106' | Report | Nacho 60'; Romero 101'; González 120+2' | Stadium: Riazor; Attendance: 18,549; Referee: Luis Mario Milla Alvéndiz |

| 6 December 2023 | Alcorcón (2) | 0–0 (a.e.t.) (4–5 p) | Cartagena (2) | Alcorcón |
| 12:00 | | Report | | Stadium: Santo Domingo; Referee: Andrés Fuentes Molina |
| | Penalties |
| | Sousa (penalty scored); Quintillà (penalty scored); Lara (penalty scored); Jacobo (penalty missed); Mosquera (penalty missed); Pérez (penalty scored); García (penalty missed) | | (penalty scored) Ortuño; (penalty scored) Hevel; (penalty missed) Muñoz; (penalty scored) Fontán; (penalty missed) Juan Carlos; (penalty scored) Alarcón; (penalty scored) Calero |

| 6 December 2023 | Terrassa (4) | 0–1 | Alavés (1) | Terrassa |
| 16:00 | | Report | Alkain 21' | Stadium: Estadi Olímpic; Attendance: 7,000; Referee: Jesús Gil Manzano |

| 6 December 2023 | Andratx (4) | 0–1 | Real Sociedad (1) | Andratx |
| 16:00 | | Report | Silva 56' | Stadium: Sa Plana; Attendance: 1,233; Referee: José María Sánchez Martínez |

| 6 December 2023 | Arenteiro (3) | 1–3 | Burgos (2) | O Carballiño |
| 16:00 | Ramos 20' | Report | Bermejo 8', 44'; Appin 54' | Stadium: Espiñedo; Referee: José Antonio López Toca |

| 6 December 2023 | Unionistas (3) | 2–0 | Sporting Gijón (2) | Salamanca |
| 16:00 | Planas 7'; Camus 53' | Report | | Stadium: Reina Sofía; Attendance: 4,896; Referee: Adrián Cordero Vega |

| 6 December 2023 | Málaga (3) | 1–0 | Eldense (2) | Málaga |
| 17:00 | Juanpe 41' | Report | | Stadium: La Rosaleda; Attendance: 12,720; Referee: Iosu Galech Apezteguía |

| 6 December 2023 | Villanovense (4) | 1–2 | Real Betis (1) | Villanueva de la Serena |
| 19:00 | Cano 63' | Report | Ezzalzouli 89'; Iglesias 90+3' | Stadium: Estadio Romero Cuerda; Attendance: 8,000; Referee: Javier Alberola Rojas |

| 6 December 2023 | Valle de Egüés (4) | 0–3 | Mallorca (1) | Aranguren (Note: Valle de Egüés did not play the match in their main stadium Sarriguren, Egüés, as it did not meet the broadcasting requirements.) |
| 19:00 | | Report | Rodríguez 39'; Llabrés 56', 62' | Stadium: Estadio Valle Araguren; Attendance: 1,400; Referee: Ricardo de Burgos Bengoetxea |

| 6 December 2023 | Lugo (3) | 2–0 | Mirandés (2) | Lugo |
| 19:00 | Antonetti 87'; Fuentes 90+2' | Report | | Stadium: Anxo Carro; Referee: Alejandro Quintero González |

| 6 December 2023 | Levante (2) | 0–1 | Amorebieta (2) | Valencia |
| 19:00 | | Report | Eraso 71' | Stadium: Ciutat de València; Attendance: 11,216; Referee: Miguel Sesma Espinosa |

| 6 December 2023 | Atlético Astorga (5) | 0–2 | Sevilla (1) | Astorga |
| 21:00 | | Report | Ramos 28' (pen.); Gattoni 68' | Stadium: La Eragudina; Attendance: 2,050; Referee: Alejandro Muñiz Ruiz |

| 6 December 2023 | Tudelano (4) | 1–2 (a.e.t.) | Las Palmas (1) | Tudela |
| 21:00 | Rodríguez 42' (pen.) | Report | Kaba 38'; Munir 120+4' | Stadium: Ciudad de Tudela; Referee: Juan Martínez Munuera |

| 7 December 2023 | Arandina (4) | 2–1 | Cádiz (1) | Aranda de Duero |
| 19:00 | Ceesay 5'; Pesca 65' | Report | San Emeterio 34' | Stadium: El Montecillo; Referee: Francisco José Hernández Maeso |

| 7 December 2023 | Linares (3) | 1–3 | Elche (2) | Linares |
| 20:00 | Corral 61' | Report | Garcés 58'; Febas 83'; León 89' | Stadium: Linarejos; Referee: Germán Cid Camacho |

| 7 December 2023 | Racing Ferrol (2) | 1–0 | Leganés (2) | Ferrol |
| 20:00 | Nacho 56' | Report | | Stadium: A Malata; Referee: Rubén Ávalos Barrera |

| 7 December 2023 | Melilla (3) | 1–1 (a.e.t.) (1–4 p) | Eibar (2) | Melilla |
| 20:00 | Enrique 22' | Report | Quique 54' (pen.) | Stadium: Álvarez Claro; Referee: José Luis Guzmán Mansilla |
| | Penalties |
| | Caro (penalty missed); Yuste (penalty missed); García (penalty scored) | | (penalty scored) Corpas; (penalty scored) Quique; (penalty scored) Tejero; (penalty scored) Muguruza |

| 7 December 2023 | Orihuela (4) | 2–5 | Girona (1) | Orihuela |
| 21:00 | Mendinueta 27'; Booker 45+3' | Report | Torre 7'; Stuani 66', 74'; Portu 82'; Valery 87' | Stadium: Los Arcos; Attendance: 7,000; Referee: Mateo Busquets Ferrer |

| 7 December 2023 | Cayón (4) | 0–3 | Athletic Bilbao (1) | Santander (Note: Cayón did not play the match in their main stadium Fernando Astobiza, Cayón, as it did not meet the broadcasting requirements.) |
| 21:00 | | Report | Villalibre 22', 26' (pen.); N. Williams 85' | Stadium: Campos de Sport de El Sardinero; Attendance: 12,295; Referee: Javier Iglesias Villanueva |

| 7 December 2023 | Sestao River (3) | 1–2 | Celta Vigo (1) | Sestao |
| 21:00 | Núñez 73' (o.g.) | Report | Douvikas 17', 78' (pen.) | Stadium: Las Llanas; Attendance: 3,365; Referee: Pablo González Fuertes |

== Round of 32 ==
=== Draw ===
The draw for the round of 32 was held on 12 December 2023 in the RFEF headquarters in Las Rozas. The four participant teams of the 2024 Supercopa de España were drawn with the teams from the lowest category. The remaining teams from the lowest categories faced the rest of La Liga teams. Matches were played at stadiums of lower-ranked teams.

A total of sixteen matches were played between 6 and 8 January 2024.

| Pot 1; 4 participants in 2024 Supercopa de España | Pot 2; 13 teams of La Liga | Pot 3; 9 teams of Segunda División | Pot 4; 4 teams of Primera Federación | Pot 5; 2 teams of Segunda Federación |
| Atlético Madrid; Barcelona; Osasuna; Real Madrid | Alavés; Athletic Bilbao; Celta Vigo; Getafe; Girona; Las Palmas; Mallorca; Rayo Vallecano; Real Betis; Real Sociedad; Sevilla; Valencia; Villarreal | Amorebieta; Burgos; Cartagena; Eibar; Elche; Espanyol; Huesca; Racing Ferrol; Tenerife | Castellón; Lugo; Málaga; Unionistas | Arandina; Barbastro |

=== Matches ===
| 6 January 2024 | Lugo (3) | 1–3 | Atlético Madrid (1) | Lugo |
| 16:00 | Antonetti 39' | Report | Correa 2'; Depay 66', 74' | Stadium: Anxo Carro; Attendance: 8,168; Referee: Pablo González Fuertes |

| 6 January 2024 | Espanyol (2) | 0–1 | Getafe (1) | Cornellà de Llobregat |
| 17:00 | | Report | Milla 87' | Stadium: Stage Front Stadium; Attendance: 15,197; Referee: Mario Melero López |

| 6 January 2024 | Elche (2) | 0–2 | Girona (1) | Elche |
| 18:00 | | Report | Blind 37'; Couto 67' | Stadium: Martínez Valero; Attendance: 15,518; Referee: Javier Alberola Rojas |

| 6 January 2024 | Huesca (2) | 0–2 (a.e.t.) | Rayo Vallecano (1) | Huesca |
| 19:00 | | Report | Valentín 118'; Palazón 120+2' | Stadium: El Alcoraz; Attendance: 2,629; Referee: César Soto Grado |

| 6 January 2024 | Alavés (1) | 1–0 | Real Betis (1) | Vitoria-Gasteiz |
| 20:00 | Benavídez 57' | Report | | Stadium: Mendizorrotza; Attendance: 13,567; Referee: Javier Iglesias Villanueva |

| 6 January 2024 | Arandina (4) | 1–3 | Real Madrid (1) | Aranda de Duero |
| 21:30 | Nacho 90+3' (o.g.) | Report | Joselu 54' (pen.); Brahim 55'; Rodrygo 90+1' | Stadium: Juan Carlos Higuero; Attendance: 10,000; Referee: Víctor García Verdura |

| 7 January 2024 | Amorebieta (2) | 2–4 | Celta Vigo (1) | Lezama |
| 12:00 | Jauregi 30'; Rayco 35' | Report | Rodríguez 6'; Jailson 49'; Douvikas 52', 75' | Stadium: Instalaciones de Lezama Campo 2 Attendance: 1,300; Referee: José Luis Munuera Montero |

| 7 January 2024 | Burgos (2) | 0–3 | Mallorca (1) | Burgos |
| 12:00 | | Report | González 63'; Larin 74'; Abdón 81' | Stadium: El Plantío; Attendance: 10,653; Referee: Isidro Díaz de Mera Escuderos |

| 7 January 2024 | Castellón (3) | 0–1 (a.e.t.) | Osasuna (1) | Castellón de la Plana |
| 16:00 | | Report | Arnaiz 108' | Stadium: Nou Estadi Castàlia; Attendance: 14,182; Referee: José María Sánchez Martínez |

| 7 January 2024 | Racing Ferrol (2) | 1–2 | Sevilla (1) | Ferrol |
| 16:00 | Manzanara 50' | Report | Marcão 30'; Juanlu 87' | Stadium: A Malata; Attendance: 11,011; Referee: Guillermo Cuadra Fernández |

| 7 January 2024 | Eibar (2) | 0–3 | Athletic Bilbao (1) | Eibar |
| 19:00 | | Report | Villalibre 17', 40'; Muniain 33' | Stadium: Ipurua; Attendance: 7,499; Referee: Alejandro Hernández Hernández |

| 7 January 2024 | Cartagena (2) | 1–2 (a.e.t.) | Valencia (1) | Cartagena |
| 19:00 | Ortuño 4' | Report | Canós 73'; Gayà 106' | Stadium: Cartagonova; Attendance: 8,000; Referee: Jorge Figueroa Vázquez |

| 7 January 2024 | Barbastro (4) | 2–3 | Barcelona (1) | Barbastro |
| 21:00 | De Mesa 60'; Prat 90+3' (pen.) | Report | López 18'; Raphinha 51'; Lewandowski 88' (pen.) | Stadium: Municipal de Deportes; Attendance: 5,600; Referee: Juan Luis Pulido Santana |

| 7 January 2024 | Málaga (3) | 0–1 | Real Sociedad (1) | Málaga |
| 21:00 | | Report | Galilea 49' (o.g.) | Stadium: La Rosaleda; Attendance: 22,111; Referee: Jesús Gil Manzano |

| 7 January 2024 | Tenerife (2) | 2–0 | Las Palmas (1) | Santa Cruz de Tenerife |
| 20:00 WET | Amo 4'; Luismi 21' | Report | | Stadium: Heliodoro Rodríguez López; Attendance: 21,417; Referee: Ricardo de Burgos Bengoetxea |

| 8 January 2024 (Note: The match was originally played on 7 January 2024, but was suspended and postponed until the following day at the beginning of extra time due to lighting problems in the stadium.) | Unionistas (3) | 1–1 (a.e.t.) (7–6 p) | Villarreal (1) | Salamanca |
| 16:30 | Planas 87' (pen.) | Report | Akhomach 82' | Stadium: Reina Sofía; Attendance: 5,710; Referee: Mateo Busquets Ferrer |
| | Penalties |
| | Mayor (penalty scored); Héctor (penalty scored); Ruiz (penalty scored); Planas (penalty missed); Ramírez (penalty scored); Al. Gómez (penalty scored); Giménez (penalty scored); Ad. Gómez (penalty scored) | | (penalty scored) Gerard; (penalty missed) Moreno; (penalty scored) Coquelin; (penalty scored) Trigueros; (penalty scored) Sørloth; (penalty scored) Terrats; (penalty scored) Comesaña; (penalty missed) Femenía |

== Round of 16 ==
=== Draw ===
The draw for the round of 16 was held on 8 January 2024 in the RFEF headquarters in Las Rozas. The qualified teams were split up into three groups based on their division in the 2023–24 season. When possible, matches were played at the stadiums of the lower-ranked teams, otherwise the first team drawn played at home.

A total of eight matches were played between 16 and 18 January 2024.

| Pot 1; 14 teams of La Liga | Pot 2; 1 team of Segunda División | Pot 3; 1 team of Primera Federación |
| Alavés; Athletic Bilbao; Atlético Madrid; Barcelona; Celta Vigo; Getafe; Girona; Mallorca; Osasuna; Rayo Vallecano; Real Madrid; Real Sociedad; Sevilla; Valencia | Tenerife | Unionistas |

=== Matches ===
| 16 January 2024 | Getafe (1) | 1–3 | Sevilla (1) | Getafe |
| 20:00 | Mata 23' | Report | Ramos 8'; Romero 48', 55' | Stadium: Coliseum; Attendance: 12,581; Referee: Alejandro Muñiz Ruiz |

| 16 January 2024 | Athletic Bilbao (1) | 2–0 | Alavés (1) | Bilbao |
| 21:00 | Villalibre 28', 60' | Report | | Stadium: San Mamés; Attendance: 45,233; Referee: César Soto Grado |

| 16 January 2024 | Tenerife (2) | 0–1 (a.e.t.) | Mallorca (1) | Santa Cruz de Tenerife |
| 20:00 WET | | Report | Larin 120' | Stadium: Heliodoro Rodríguez López; Attendance: 20,176; Referee: Mario Melero López |

| 17 January 2024 | Valencia (1) | 1–3 | Celta Vigo (1) | Valencia |
| 20:00 | Pepelu 29' (pen.) | Report | De la Torre 13'; Douvikas 18' (pen.), 80' | Stadium: Mestalla; Attendance: 44,456; Referee: Ricardo de Burgos Bengoetxea |

| 17 January 2024 | Osasuna (1) | 0–2 | Real Sociedad (1) | Pamplona |
| 21:00 | | Report | Oyarzabal 57' (pen.); Merino 90+7' | Stadium: El Sadar; Attendance: 21,116; Referee: Alejandro Hernández Hernández |

| 17 January 2024 | Girona (1) | 3–1 | Rayo Vallecano (1) | Girona |
| 21:30 | Stuani 15', 19' (pen.); Blind 26' | Report | Nteka 36' | Stadium: Montilivi; Attendance: 7,911; Referee: Jorge Figueroa Vázquez |

| 18 January 2024 | Unionistas (3) | 1–3 | Barcelona (1) | Salamanca |
| 19:30 | Al. Gómez 31' | Report | Torres 45'; Koundé 69'; Balde 73' | Stadium: Reina Sofía; Attendance: 6,246; Referee: Francisco José Hernández Maeso |

| 18 January 2024 | Atlético Madrid (1) | 4–2 (a.e.t.) | Real Madrid (1) | Madrid |
| 21:30 | Lino 39'; Morata 57'; Griezmann 100'; Riquelme 119' | Report | Oblak 45+1' (o.g.); Joselu 82' | Stadium: Metropolitano; Attendance: 67,623; Referee: Guillermo Cuadra Fernández |

== Quarter-finals ==
=== Draw ===
The draw for the quarter-finals was held on 19 January 2024, 13:00 UTC+1 CET, in the RFEF headquarters in Las Rozas. As there were no remaining teams from the lower divisions, home teams were determined by luck of the draw.

A total of four matches were played between 23 and 25 January 2024.

Pot 1
8 teams of La Liga
- Athletic Bilbao
- Atlético Madrid
- Barcelona
- Celta Vigo
- Girona
- Mallorca
- Real Sociedad
- Sevilla

=== Matches ===
| 23 January 2024 | Celta Vigo (1) | 1–2 | Real Sociedad (1) | Vigo |
| 21:30 | De la Torre 90+2' | Report | Oyarzabal 2'; Becker 66' | Stadium: Balaídos; Attendance: 20,903; Referee: César Soto Grado |

| 24 January 2024 | Mallorca (1) | 3–2 | Girona (1) | Palma |
| 19:30 | Larin 21'; Abdón 28', 35' (pen.) | Report | Stuani 68' (pen.); Sávio 90+6' | Stadium: Estadi Mallorca Son Moix; Attendance: 19,950; Referee: José Luis Munuera Montero |

| 24 January 2024 | Athletic Bilbao (1) | 4–2 (a.e.t.) | Barcelona (1) | Bilbao |
| 21:30 | Guruzeta 1'; Sancet 49'; I. Williams 105+2'; N. Williams 120+1' | Report | Lewandowski 26'; Yamal 32' | Stadium: San Mamés; Attendance: 50,403; Referee: José María Sánchez Martínez |

| 25 January 2024 | Atlético Madrid (1) | 1–0 | Sevilla (1) | Madrid |
| 21:00 | Depay 79' | Report | | Stadium: Metropolitano; Attendance: 60,169; Referee: Jesús Gil Manzano |

== Semi-finals ==
=== Draw ===
The draw for the semi-finals was held on 26 January 2024, 13:00 UTC+1 CET, in the RFEF headquarters in Las Rozas.

First leg matches were played on 6 and 7 February, and second leg matches were played between 27 and 29 February 2024.

Qualified teams
4 teams of La Liga
- Athletic Bilbao
- Atlético Madrid
- Mallorca
- Real Sociedad

=== Summary ===
| Team 1 | Agg. | Team 2 | 1st leg | 2nd leg |
|---|---|---|---|---|
| Mallorca (1) | 1–1 (5–4 p) | Real Sociedad (1) | 0–0 | 1–1 (a.e.t.) |
| Atlético Madrid (1) | 0–4 | Athletic Bilbao (1) | 0–1 | 0–3 |

=== Matches ===
6 February 2024
21:00

| Mallorca | 0–0 | Real Sociedad |
|---|---|---|
| | Report |

Estadi Mallorca Son Moix, Palma
Attendance: 22,051
Referee: Alejandro Muñiz Ruiz
27 February 2024
21:30

| Real Sociedad | 1–1 (a.e.t.) | Mallorca |
|---|---|---|
| Oyarzabal 71' | Report | González 50' |
Penalties
| Oyarzabal (penalty missed); Turrientes (penalty scored); Olasagasti (penalty scored); Zubimendi (penalty scored); Becker (penalty scored) | 4–5 | (penalty scored) Muriqi; (penalty scored) Morlanes; (penalty scored) Mascarell; (penalty scored) Radonjić; (penalty scored) Darder |

Anoeta, San Sebastián
Attendance: 35,781
Referee: Jesús Gil Manzano

1–1 on aggregate. Mallorca won 5–4 on penalties.

7 February 2024
21:30

| Atlético Madrid | 0–1 | Athletic Bilbao |
|---|---|---|
| | Report | Berenguer 25' (pen.) |

Metropolitano, Madrid
Attendance: 65,029
Referee: Alejandro Hernández Hernández
29 February 2024
21:30

| Athletic Bilbao | 3–0 | Atlético Madrid |
|---|---|---|
| I. Williams 13'; N. Williams 42'; Guruzeta 61' | Report |

San Mamés, Bilbao
Attendance: 52,061
Referee: Juan Martínez Munuera

Athletic Bilbao won 4–0 on aggregate.

== Final ==
6 April 2024
22:00 CEST

| Athletic Bilbao | 1–1 (a.e.t.) | Mallorca |
|---|---|---|
| Sancet 50' | Report | Rodríguez 21' |
Penalties
| R. García (penalty scored); Muniain (penalty scored); Vesga (penalty scored); Berenguer (penalty scored) | 4–2 | (penalty scored) Muriqi; (penalty missed) Morlanes; (penalty missed) Radonjić; (penalty scored) Sánchez |

La Cartuja, Seville
Attendance: 57,619
Referee: José Luis Munuera Montero

== Top scorers ==
| Rank | Player | Club | Goals |
|---|---|---|---|
| 1 | (Spain) Abdón | Mallorca | 6 |
| 1 | (Greece) Anastasios Douvikas | Celta Vigo | 6 |
| 1 | (Spain) Asier Villalibre | Athletic Bilbao | 6 |
| 4 | (Uruguay) Cristhian Stuani | Girona | 5 |
| 5 | (Canada) Cyle Larin | Mallorca | 4 |
| 5 | (Brazil) Willian José | Real Betis | 4 |
| 7 | (Spain) Xeber Alkain | Alavés | 3 |
| 7 | (Puerto Rico) Leandro Antonetti | Lugo | 3 |
| 7 | (Netherlands) Memphis Depay | Atlético Madrid | 3 |
| 7 | (Morocco) Abde Ezzalzouli | Real Betis | 3 |
| 7 | (Colombia) Radamel Falcao | Rayo Vallecano | 3 |
| 7 | (Spain) Jon Karrikaburu | Alavés | 3 |
| 7 | (Spain) Kike | Hernán Cortés | 3 |
| 7 | (Spain) Juanmi Latasa | Getafe | 3 |
| 7 | (Spain) Víctor Meseguer | Valladolid | 3 |
| 7 | (Spain) Óscar | Getafe | 3 |
| 7 | (Spain) Mikel Oyarzabal | Real Sociedad | 3 |
| 7 | (Spain) Alfred Planas | Unionistas | 3 |
| 7 | (Spain) Rodri | Real Betis | 3 |
| 7 | (Spain) Manu Trigueros | Villarreal | 3 |
| 7 | (Spain) Nico Williams | Athletic Bilbao | 3 |
