= Christopher Howse =

British Catholic journalist (born 1955)

- Born: 1955 (age 70–71)
- Alma mater: Oxford University
- Occupations: Journalist, commentator and author
- Writing career
- Language: English
- Subjects: Spain, Soho, religion
- Notable works: A Pilgrim in Spain; The Train in Spain; Soho in the Eighties

Christopher Howse (born 1955) is a London-based journalist, commentator and author. He is an assistant editor of The Daily Telegraph and has a regular column in the Saturday edition of the newspaper. He was previously the obituaries editor. Howse contributes articles and reviews to The Spectator, The Tablet, The Oldie and several other publications. He has written books on Soho, religious issues and two travelogues on Spain.

== Career as a journalist ==
Christopher Howse was born in 1955. He studied English language and literature at Oxford University, graduating in 1978. Howse started work as a journalist for the Catholic Herald where he stayed for five years. He then worked for The Tablet and The Spectator, before joining The Daily Telegraph in 1992. He was the newspaper's obituaries editor from 1996 to 1999. He is now an assistant editor for the Telegraph and writes some of the newspaper's leading articles. He has a weekly column in the Saturday edition of the newspaper, called Sacred Mysteries, which considers religious topics in history and culture.

Howse continues to contribute articles to The Tablet (where he has a regular column called "Notebook"), to The Spectator, The Oldie magazine, as well as the British Journalism Review. He has written book reviews for the Literary Review.

Howse has an interest in Soho, and has written a book and newspaper articles on the characters of that part of London. He was friendly with Norman Balon, the landlord of the Coach and Horses and wrote tributes of him after his death in 2026. Howse appears next to Balon in a painting of the pub by Rupert Shrive that was presented to Balon when he retired as landlord in 2006, and is on the cover of Howse's 2018 book on Soho.

== Career as an author ==
Howse has written a number of books, many of them have religious or devotional themes. He has edited a history of the The Daily Telegraph, with the title of How We Saw It, marking the newspaper's 150th anniversary in 2005. In 1989 he edited an anthology entitled The Wit of The Spectator. Howse has contributed five entries for the Oxford Dictionary of National Biography, including that of P. J. Kavanagh.

=== A Pilgrim in Spain ===
Three of Howse's books attracted wider critical attention. In 2011 Howse published A Pilgrim in Spain, a travelogue exploring the religious landmarks of Spain. This was not based on the traditional Camino de Santiago pilgrimage route to Santiago de Compostela, though the book does end there. Instead Howse reaches the city through less well-known locations such as Turégano, with its 12th-century castle, and the Visigothic church of San Juan Bautista, Baños de Cerrato.

Fred Fernández-Armesto, in his review for the Times Literary Supplement, welcomed the author's self-effacing approach, allowing the obscure corners of Castilian Spain to speak for themselves. In The Spectator, Michael Jacobs described the book as "gloriously and provocatively unfashionable", with its focus on Spain's cathedrals, churches and spirituality. Jacobs concludes: "He encourages an informed response towards one of Europe's greatest and most neglected ecclesiastical legacies."

=== The Train in Spain ===
This was followed in 2013 by The Train in Spain, also a travelogue but this time based on ten railway journeys across the Iberian Peninsula. The book's first sentence clarifies the intent: "This is a book about Spain, not about trains". The first journey in the book is from the Pyrenean frontier at Canfranc down to Montserrat Abbey, near Barcelona. The last journey is from Burgos to Madrid. Fiona Sampson in The New Statesman was unimpressed with the book, suggesting that Howse's unwillingness to use the first person singular gave stylistic distortions to the narrative. She missed the coherence and chaos of modern life: "It's as if he has forgotten that Spain is a society that exists for itself, rather than a cultural museum for outsiders. Perhaps he travelled first class."

Writing for The Spectator, Harry Eyres was more enthusiastic about the book, given that Howse's knowledge of Spain is "profound and marvellously eccentric". The reviewer called the book a small classic. Eyres was impressed with Howse's description of the chapel of the Holy Spirit in Tudela Cathedral, which he compared to the prose of Patrick Leigh-Fermor.

=== Soho in the Eighties ===
Soho in the Eighties was published by Bloomsbury Continuum in 2018, following in the footsteps of Daniel Farson's chronicle, Soho in the Fifties. Will Self gave a review of Howse's book to The Guardian, where Self said that he was more a participant of this era than an observer. Self wrote that the book was a generally accurate and sympathetic account of Soho's "crapulent denizens", if over-skewed to the aspects that related to Private Eye. Howse takes an unsentimental view of the main driver behind Soho's high spirits during the 1980s—and the thirty years before that—namely the influence of alcohol; and the role of market forces in extinguishing many of the characteristics of Soho over the years. Self called the book "elegiac and emetic".

Grub Smith in the Financial Times said: "Opening this book is like walking into a heavy drinkers’ pub. You are immediately confronted by a surly, unwelcoming cast of alcoholics, bullies, charlatans and chancers." Smith described Howse as making a rigorous and likeable attempt to salvage their reputations.

== Personal life ==
Howse is a Roman Catholic and regards Westminster Cathedral as his local church.

== Bibliography ==
- AD: 2000 years of Christianity. London: SPCK. 1999. ISBN 978-0-281-05287-5. OCLC 42444486.
- Sacred Mysteries: the human face of religion. London ; New York: Continuum. 2007. ISBN 978-0-8264-9497-9. OCLC 82672007.
- Pilgrim in Spain. London: Bloomsbury Publishing plc. 2011. ISBN 978-1-4411-2558-3. OCLC 1027179188.
- The Train in Spain. London: Bloomsbury Publishing plc. 2013. ISBN 978-1-4411-9805-1. OCLC 860919532.
- Soho in the Eighties. London: Bloomsbury Continuum. 2018. ISBN 978-1-4729-1480-4. OCLC 1031419537.

As editor:

- The Wit of The Spectator. London: Century. 1989. ISBN 978-0-7126-2903-4. OCLC 19774220.
- Best Sermons Ever. London ; New York: Continuum. 2001. ISBN 978-0-8264-7097-3. OCLC 49189847.
- The Best Spiritual Reading Ever. London: Continuum. 2002. ISBN 978-0-8264-6288-6. OCLC 59361863.
- How We Saw It: 150 years of The Daily Telegraph; 1855 - 2005. London: Ebury Press. 2004. ISBN 978-0-09-189463-4. OCLC 56640728.
- Comfort. London ; New York: Continuum. 2005. ISBN 978-0-8264-7641-8. OCLC 57637719.
- Prayers for This Life. London ; New York: Continuum. 2005. ISBN 978-0-8264-7642-5. OCLC 58831855.
- The Assurance of Hope. London ; New York: Continuum. 2006. ISBN 978-0-8264-8271-6. OCLC 373470188.
- She Literally Exploded: The Daily Telegraph infuriating phrasebook. London: Constable and Robinson. 2007. ISBN 978-1-84529-675-9. OCLC 156813177. (Edited with Richard Preston).
