= CD Zirauki =

Association football club in Spain

Zirauki
- Full name: Club Deportivo Zirauki
- Founded: 1971; 2009 (refounded)
- Ground: Antxekoa, Cirauqui, Navarre, Spain
- Capacity: 1,000
- President: Jesús Delgado
- Manager: Diego Prendes
- League: Regional Preferente – Group 1
- 2025–26: Regional Preferente – Group 1, 5th of 16
- Website: https://www.cdzirauki.es/
Home colours	Away colours

Club Deportivo Zirauki is a Spanish football club based in Cirauqui, in the autonomous community of Navarre. Founded in 1971 and refounded in 2009, the club play in the Regional Preferente – Group 1, holding home matches at the Antxekoa.

== History ==
The club started playing as Club Deportivo Cirauqui in the 1960s, but was officially formed in 1971. They only played in Tercera Regional and Segunda Regional before folding in 1986.

Zirauki returned to an active status in 2009, in the Primera Regional. On 26 August 2023, the club won the Supercopa de Navarra after beating CD Iruña on penalties, and qualified to the 2023–24 Copa del Rey.

== Season to season ==
=== CD Cirauqui ===
Season	Tier	Division	Place	Copa del Rey
1971–72	6	3ª Reg.	6th	
1972–73	6	3ª Reg.	5th	
1973–74	6	3ª Reg.	5th	
1974–75	6	2ª Reg.	5th	
1975–76	6	2ª Reg.	10th	
1976–77	6	2ª Reg.	9th	
1977–78	7	2ª Reg.	10th	
1978–79	7	2ª Reg.	11th	

Season	Tier	Division	Place	Copa del Rey
1979–80	7	2ª Reg.	7th	
1980–81	7	2ª Reg.	6th	
1981–82	7	2ª Reg.	10th	
1982–83	7	2ª Reg.	5th	
1983–84	7	2ª Reg.	10th	
1984–85	7	2ª Reg.	5th	
1985–86	7	2ª Reg.	6th	

=== CD Zirauki ===
Season	Tier	Division	Place	Copa del Rey
2009–10	6	1ª Reg.	11th	
2010–11	6	1ª Reg.	3rd	
2011–12	6	1ª Reg.	3rd	
2012–13	5	Reg. Pref.	13th	
2013–14	6	1ª Reg.	1st	
2014–15	5	Reg. Pref.	6th	
2015–16	5	1ª Aut.	10th	
2016–17	5	1ª Aut.	14th	
2017–18	5	1ª Aut.	16th	
2018–19	6	Reg. Pref.	1st	
2019–20	5	1ª Aut.	11th	
2020–21	5	1ª Aut.	4th	
2021–22	6	1ª Aut.	9th	
2022–23	7	Reg. Pref.	2nd	
2023–24	7	Reg. Pref.	5th	Preliminary
2024–25	7	Reg. Pref.	8th	
2025–26	7	Reg. Pref.		
