= CF Tardienta =

Association football club in Spain

Tardienta
- Full name: Club de Fútbol Tardienta
- Founded: 1959
- Ground: Santa Quiteria, Tardienta, Aragon, Spain
- Capacity: 2,000
- President: José Luis Herrero Alcubierre
- Head coach: Diego Coco
- League: Segunda Regional – Group 2, subgroup 1
- 2025–26: Segunda Regional – Group 2, subgroup 1, 2nd of 15
Home colours	Away colours

Club de Fútbol Tardienta is a Spanish football team based in Tardienta, in the autonomous community of Aragon. Founded in 1959, they play in the Segunda Regional – Group 2, subgroup 1, and holds home games at Campo Municipal de Deportes Santa Quiteria, with a capacity of 2,000 people.

== Season to season ==
Season	Tier	Division	Place	Copa del Rey
1959–60	4	1ª Reg.	13th	
1960–61	4	1ª Reg.	4th	
1961–62	4	1ª Reg.	3rd	
1962–1968	DNP			
1968–69	6	2ª Reg.	4th	
1969–70	6	2ª Reg.	1st	
1970–71	5	1ª Reg.	12th	
1971–72	5	1ª Reg.	6th	
1972–73	5	1ª Reg.	15th	
1973–74	5	1ª Reg.	8th	
1974–75	5	1ª Reg.	16th	
1975–76	5	1ª Reg.	8th	
1976–77	5	1ª Reg.	16th	
1977–78	6	1ª Reg.	2nd	
1978–79	5	Reg. Pref.	20th	
1979–80	6	1ª Reg.	7th	
1980–81	6	1ª Reg.	2nd	
1981–82	5	Reg. Pref.	20th	
1982–83	6	1ª Reg.	14th	
1983–84	6	1ª Reg.	16th	

Season	Tier	Division	Place	Copa del Rey
1984–85	6	1ª Reg.	16th	
1985–86	6	1ª Reg.	10th	
1986–1998	DNP			
1998–99	7	2ª Reg.	10th	
1999–2000	7	2ª Reg.	9th	
2000–01	7	2ª Reg.	1st	
2001–02	6	1ª Reg.	13th	
2002–03	6	1ª Reg.	17th	
2003–04	7	2ª Reg.	3rd	
2004–05	7	2ª Reg.	3rd	
2005–06	6	1ª Reg.	12th	
2006–07	6	1ª Reg.	5th	
2007–08	6	1ª Reg.	6th	
2008–09	6	1ª Reg.	12th	
2009–10	6	1ª Reg.	4th	
2010–11	6	1ª Reg.	3rd	
2011–12	6	1ª Reg.	2nd	
2012–13	5	Reg. Pref.	9th	
2013–14	5	Reg. Pref.	5th	
2014–15	5	Reg. Pref.	11th	

Season	Tier	Division	Place	Copa del Rey
2015–16	5	Reg. Pref.	16th	
2016–17	6	1ª Reg.	1st	
2017–18	5	Reg. Pref.	10th	
2018–19	5	Reg. Pref.	11th	
2019–20	5	Reg. Pref.	7th	
2020–21	5	Reg. Pref.	3rd	
2021–22	6	Reg. Pref.	4th	
2022–23	6	Reg. Pref.	3rd	
2023–24	6	Reg. Pref.	17th	First round
2024–25	7	1ª Reg.	15th	
2025–26	8	2ª Reg.		
