= 2000 South American Youth Championships in Athletics =

XV South American Youth Championships in Athletics
- Dates: November 4–5
- Host city: Bogotá, Colombia
- Venue: Estadio El Salitre
- Level: Youth
- Events: 42
- Participation: about 228 athletes from 12 nations

The 15th South American Youth Championships in Athletics were held at the Estadio El Salitre in Bogotá, Colombia from November 4–5, 2000. For the first time, the competition was open for athletes from the age group under 18 (U18) rather than under 17 (U17) as before.

== Medal summary ==
Medal winners are published for boys and girls. Complete results can be found on the "World Junior Athletics History" website.

All results are marked as "affected by altitude" (A), because Bogotá is located at 2,625 metres above sea level.

=== Men ===
Event	Gold		Silver		Bronze	
100 metres (wind: -1.0 m/s)	Bruno Pacheco (BRA)	10.88A	Luís Ambrósio (BRA)	10.93A	Diego Valdés (CHI)	10.96A
200 metres (wind: -2.7 m/s)	Angelo Edmund (PAN)	21.45A	Bruno Pacheco (BRA)	21.89A	Klaydson de Souza (BRA)	22.00A
400 metres	Luis Luna (VEN)	47.65A	Angelo Edmund (PAN)	47.75A	Klaydson de Souza (BRA)	48.30A
800 metres	Olwyn Granados (VEN)	1:55.31A	Elio Arenas (ARG)	1:56.64A	Cristián Matute (ECU)	1:57.74A
1500 metres	Clayton Aguiar (BRA)	4:06.15A	Wendell da Conceição (BRA)	4:07.81A	Edison Pico (COL)	4:08.78A
3000 metres	Giovanny Amador (COL)	9:07.23A	Wendell da Conceição (BRA)	9:09.05A	Darwin Tayupo (VEN)	9:13.27A
2000 metres steeplechase	Fernando Fernandes (BRA)	6:19.46A	Juarez de Souza (BRA)	6:32.62A	Cristián Patiño (ECU)	6:40.92A
110 metres hurdles (wind: -0.8 m/s)	Thiago Dias (BRA)	13.79A	Sebastián Bustos (ARG)	14.18A	Nerluis Pereira (VEN)	14.20A
400 metres hurdles	José Ferrín (ECU)	53.46A	Tiago Bueno (BRA)	54.17A	Joelson da Silva (BRA)	54.44A
High jump	Fábio Baptista (BRA)	2.07A	Renan dos Santos (BRA)	2.07A	Gerardo Canale (ARG)	2.04A
Pole vault	José Francisco Nava (CHI)	5.00A	Fábio da Silva (BRA)	4.95A	Rodrigo Constantino (BRA)	4.55A
Long jump	Marcos Trivelato (BRA)	7.51A	Thiago Dias (BRA)	7.46A	Helmut Ospina (COL)	7.14A
Triple jump	Leonardo dos Santos (BRA)	14.85A	Fernando dos Santos (BRA)	14.73A	Jorge Cardona (COL)	14.36A
Shot put	Germán Lauro (ARG)	17.77A	Clayton Santos (BRA)	17.36A	Gustavo de Mendonça (BRA)	17.20A
Discus throw	Germán Lauro (ARG)	53.99A	Gustavo de Mendonça (BRA)	51.43A	Paolo Mangili (CHI)	50.14A
Hammer throw	Fabián Di Paolo (ARG)	74.24A	Roberto Sáez (CHI)	71.62A	Marcos Leiva (ARG)	61.89A
Javelin throw	Júlio César de Oliveira (BRA)	66.10A	Dairon Márquez (COL)	62.44A	Nicolás Infante (CHI)	61.28A
Octathlon	Federico Staudt (BRA)	5506A	Roberto Morgon (BRA)	5482A	Fernando Martín (ARG)	5158A
10,000 metres track walk	Andrés Chocho (ECU)	47:52.68A	Rafael dos Anjos Duarte (BRA)	49:22.18A	Pablo Pinzón (COL)	49:43.26A
4 × 100 metres relay	Brazil; Luiz da Silva; André Oliveira; Luís Ambrósio; Bruno Pacheco	40.77A	Chile; Cristián Riesco; Nicolás Sepúlveda; Pablo Colville; Diego Valdés	41.73A	Colombia; Uriel Linero; John Valoyes; Geiler Rovira; Jackson Moreno	42.61A
1000 metres Medley relay	Brazil; Luís Ambrósio; Luiz da Silva; Bruno Pacheco; Klaydson de Souza	1:53.67A	Venezuela; Luis Luna; Olwin Granados; Nerluis Pereira; Orlando Acosta	1:55.07A	Colombia; Uriel Linero; Geiler Rovira; John Valoyes; Jackson Moreno	1:57.69A

=== Women ===
Event	Gold		Silver		Bronze	
100 metres (wind: +0.2 m/s)	Thatiana Ignácio (BRA)	11.55A	Wilmary Álvarez (VEN)	11.74A	Luciana Lazet (ARG)	11.82A
200 metres (wind: -3.3 m/s)	Luciana Lazet (ARG)	24.00A	Wilmary Álvarez (VEN)	24.18A	Liliana Tantucci (ARG)	24.33A
400 metres	Yusmelys García (VEN)	53.94A	Amanda Dias (BRA)	54.36A	Joyce Prieto (BRA)	55.94A
800 metres	Juliana de Azevedo (BRA)	2:13.87A	Jenny Mejías (VEN)	2:15.94A	Gabriela Chalá (ECU)	2:17.05A
1500 metres	Silvia Paredes (ECU)	4:50.84A	Jennifer Garzón (COL)	4:54.16A	Diana Alzate (COL)	5:05.07A
3000 metres	Silvia Paredes (ECU)	10:37.37A	Inés Melchor (PER)	10:40.67A	Luisa Jiménez (COL)	10:51.25A
2000 metres steeplechase	Patrícia Lobo (BRA)	7:47.32A	Luisa Jiménez (COL)	8:03.72A	Lina María Arias (COL)	8:15.23A
100 metres hurdles (wind: +0.1 m/s)	Sandrine Legenort (VEN)	14.01A	Soledad Donzino (ARG)	14.17A	Evelyn de Santana (BRA)	14.61A
400 metres hurdles	Yusmelys García (VEN)	61.63A	Evelyn de Santana (BRA)	63.34A	Martina Valoyes (COL)	64.53A
High jump	Jhoris Luque (VEN)	1.74A	Jailma de Lima (BRA)	1.74A	Paula Bastías (ARG)	1.72A
Pole vault	Alejandra Llorente (ARG)	3.60A	Rosângela da Silva (BRA)	3.55A	Michaela Heitkotter (BRA)	3.55A
Long jump	Keila Costa (BRA)	6.05A	Macarena Reyes (CHI)	5.66A	Cinthia de Lima (BRA)	5.66A
Triple jump	Keila Costa (BRA)	13.04A	Ivonne Patarroyo (COL)	12.17A	Cinthia de Lima (BRA)	12.07A
Shot put	Paola Cheppi (ARG)	13.77A	Arelis Quiñones (COL)	13.37A	Juliana Olier (COL)	13.14A
Discus throw	Arelis Quiñones (COL)	42.27A	Jennifer Dahlgren (ARG)	39.55A	Brigitte Flores (PER)	37.85A
Hammer throw	Jennifer Dahlgren (ARG)	56.68A	Laura Perovich (ARG)	45.50A	Stefanía Żoryez (URU)	44.02A
Javelin throw	Edna Rodrigues (BRA)	45.07A	Adriana Torres (COL)	43.77A	Catalina Toro (CHI)	42.67A
Heptathlon	Soledad Donzino (ARG)	4573A	Patricia Cavanna (ARG)	4495A	Virna Salazar (ECU)	4392A
5000 metres track walk	Ariana Quino (BOL)	26:06.23A	Carla Litardo (ECU)	26:47.11A	Gina Meneses (COL)	26:54.90A
4 × 100 metres relay	Venezuela; Myleidi López; Jenny Mejías; Sandrine Legenort; Yusmelys García	45.99A	Brazil; Mônica de Freitas; Joice Vignoli; Evelyn dos Santos; Thatiana Ignâcio	46.15A	Argentina; Soledad Donzino; Paula Bastias; Liliana Tantucci; Luciana Lazet	46.67A
1000 metres Medley relay	Brazil; Joyce Prieto; Evelyn dos Santos; Thatiana Ignâcio; Amanda Dias	2:12.21A	Venezuela; Yusmelys García; Myleidi López; Wilmary Álvarez; Sandrine Legenort	2:14.05A	Argentina; Jorgelina Litterini; Soledad Donzino; Liliana Tantucci; Luciana Lazet	2:16.50A

== Medal table (unofficial) ==
* Host nation (Brazil)

Rank	Nation	Gold	Silver	Bronze	Total
1	Brazil*	18	19	10	47
2	Argentina	8	6	8	22
3	Venezuela	7	5	2	14
4	Ecuador	4	1	4	9
5	Colombia	2	6	12	20
6	Chile	1	3	4	8
7	Panama	1	1	0	2
8	Bolivia	1	0	0	1
9	Peru	0	1	1	2
10	Uruguay	0	0	1	1
Totals (10 entries)		42	42	42	126

== Participation (unofficial) ==
Detailed result lists can be found on the "World Junior Athletics History" website. An unofficial count yields the number of about 228 athletes from about 12 countries:

- Argentina (22)
- Bolivia (6)
- Brazil (63)
- Chile (22)
- Colombia (39)
- Ecuador (29)
- Guyana (2)
- Panama (3)
- Paraguay (3)
- Peru (8)
- Uruguay (11)
- Venezuela (20)
