= Ángel González (footballer, born 1995) =

Argentine footballer

Personal information
- Full name: Marcelo Ángel González Zuluaga
- Date of birth: 3 October 1995 (age 31)
- Place of birth: Argentina
- Height: 1.72 m (5 ft 8 in)
- Position: Midfielder

Team information
- Current team: Hernán Cortés

Senior career*
| Years | Team | Apps | (Gls) |
| 2018 | Telavi | 14 | (0) |
| 2018–2020 | Oriku | 25 | (3) |
| 2020 | Bylis | 2 | (0) |
| 2022 | Devolli | | |
| 2022–2023 | Turbina Cërrik | 15 | (0) |
| 2023– | Hernán Cortés | | |
- * Club domestic league appearances and goals as of 1 April 2023

Marcelo Ángel González Zuluaga (born 3 October 1995) is an Argentine footballer who plays as a midfielder for Spanish club Hernán Cortés.

== Career ==
=== Bylis ===
In January 2020, Gonzalez moved to Albanian Superliga club Bylis. He made his league debut for the club on 26 January 2020, starting in a 1–0 away defeat to Teuta Durrës.
