= Lendínez =

Lendínez is a Spanish surname. Notable people with the surname include:

- Martín Lendínez, the pseudonym of Mariano Antolín Rato (1943–2025), Spanish writer and translator
- Juanma Lendínez (born 2003), Spanish professional footballer
- Rubén Iranzo Lendínez (born 2003), Spanish professional footballer
