= Juan Morgado =

Spanish footballer (born 1954)

Personal information
- Full name: Juan Morgado Dorado
- Date of birth: 24 October 1952 (age 74)
- Place of birth: Fregenal de la Sierra, Extremadura, Spain
- Height: 1.75 m (5 ft 9 in)
- Position: Defender

Youth career
- 1967–1970: Hernán Cortés

Senior career*
Years	Team	Apps	(Gls)
1970–1971	Hernán Cortés		
1971–1972	Careva		
1972–1973	Badajoz		
1973–1974	Real Madrid Castilla		
1973–1976	Real Madrid	13	(0)
1975–1976	→ Real Murcia (loan)	28	(1)
1976–1981	Deportivo Alavés	167	(7)
1981–1984	Real Zaragoza	92	(1)
1984–1985	Elche	14	(0)
1985–1986	Deportivo Alavés	37	(0)
1986–1989	Alzira	81	(1)
Total		432	(9)
- * Club domestic league appearances and goals

Juan Morgado Dorado (born 24 October 1952) is a Spanish retired footballer. Sometimes known as simply Morgado, he played as a defender for Real Madrid, Deportivo Alavés and Real Zaragoza throughout the 1970s and the 1980s.

== Club cacreer ==
Growing up in Badajoz, Morgado began his career within the youth sector of CD Hernán Cortés beginning in 1967, remaining there until 1970 where he developed a reputation for having a confident stature in his defensive plays. His success within the youth category saw him promoted to the senior squad of the team during the 1970–71 Primera Regional de Extremadura. Despite a moderately successful season however, he switched to play for Careva in the following season where his defensive plays became formalized. This led him to begin a career outside of Extremadura within the 1972–73 Tercera División for Badajoz, nearly achieving promotion within his only season with the club. By then, he had developed a reputation of being a promising defender that had overcame many trials within Spanish football and was later signed by Real Madrid Castilla after he attracted their attention. The 1973–74 season was pivotal for Morgado as he promoted to the senior squad of Castilla, making his debut in a match against Eibar on 2 September 1973. Despite being promoted to Real Madrid proper within the same season, he wouldn't see many appearances throughout his three-season long career with the club though would remain due to him producing results in his substitution appearances. However, he was loaned during the 1975–76 season to Real Murcia where he played a vital role in the club's formation that season, becoming part of the club's starting XI despite only remaining there for a single season.

His biggest career highlight came in the following 1976–77 season when he was signed by Deportivo Alavés for the 1976–77 Segunda División where he played a similar role in establishing a core foundation of the club's defense. He remained there for five seasons as despite the club not achieving promotion during his tenure, found a club for his defensive plays to shine. He then played for Real Zaragoza for the following three seasons, finally seeing play within La Liga during the climax of his career. This period also saw him score his only goal within the top-flight of Spanish football in a 4–0 beating against Celta de Vigo on 9 January 1983. He continued his La Liga career with Elche for their 1984–85 season as despite his age, still demonstrated great physical strength. He briefly returned to Alavés for the following 1985–86 season before spending the remainder of the 1980s with Alzira within the Tercera División, retiring following their relegation in the 1988–89 Segunda División.

== Later life ==
Following his footballing career, he primarily worked within an insurance company. However, in 1995, he returned to Real Zaragoza as an assistant manager as well as a delegate for match officials and remained within this role until 2016.
