= Turégano CF =

Turégano
- Full name: Turégano Club de Fútbol
- Founded: 1950
- Stadium: El Burgo, Turégano, Castile and León, Spain
- Capacity: 500
- President: Luis Peromingo
- Manager: Luis Bertó
- League: Tercera Federación – Group 8
- 2025–26: Primera Regional – Group A, 3rd of 16 (promoted via play-offs)
Home colours	Away colours

Turégano Club de Fútbol is a Spanish football club based in Turégano in the autonomous community of Castile and León. Founded in 1950, it plays in Tercera Federación – Group 8, holding home games at Estadio El Burgo, with a capacity of 500 seats.

== Season to season ==
Season	Tier	Division	Place	Copa del Rey
1950–1979	—	Regional	—	
1979–80	8	3ª Reg. P.	7th	
1980–81	8	3ª Reg. P.	14th	
1981–82	9	3ª Reg.	2nd	
1982–83	8	3ª Reg. P.	8th	
1983–84	8	3ª Reg. P.	10th	
1984–85	8	3ª Reg. P.	(R)	
1985–86	9	3ª Reg.	1st	
1986–87	6	1ª Prov.	10th	
1987–88	6	1ª Prov.	15th	
1988–89	6	1ª Prov.	17th	
1990–91	6	1ª Prov.	8th	
1991–1995	DNP			
1995–96	6	1ª Prov.	5th	
1996–97	7	2ª Prov.	8th	
1997–98	7	2ª Prov.	2nd	
1998–99	6	1ª Prov.	5th	
1999–2000	6	1ª Prov.	9th	
2000–01	6	1ª Prov.	6th	
2001–02	6	1ª Prov.	8th	

Season	Tier	Division	Place	Copa del Rey
2002–03	6	1ª Prov.	6th	
2003–04	6	1ª Prov.	10th	
2004–05	6	1ª Prov.	10th	
2005–06	6	1ª Prov.	2nd	
2006–07	6	1ª Prov.	8th	
2007–08	6	1ª Prov.	2nd	
2008–09	6	1ª Prov.	1st	
2009–10	6	1ª Prov.	2nd	
2010–11	6	1ª Prov.	2nd	
2011–12	6	1ª Prov.	6th	
2012–13	6	1ª Prov.	1st	
2013–14	6	1ª Prov.	9th	
2014–15	6	1ª Prov.	13th	
2015–16	6	1ª Prov.	4th	
2016–17	6	1ª Prov.	5th	
2017–18	6	1ª Prov.	1st	
2018–19	6	1ª Prov.	1st	
2019–20	5	1ª Reg.	9th	
2020–21	5	1ª Reg.	4th	
2021–22	6	1ª Reg.	3rd	

Season	Tier	Division	Place	Copa del Rey
2022–23	6	1ª Reg.	2nd	Preliminary
2023–24	6	1ª Reg.	3rd	First round
2024–25	6	1ª Reg.	3rd	
2025–26	6	1ª Reg.	3rd	
2026–27	5	3ª Fed.		

- 1 season in Tercera Federación
