= Unionistas de Salamanca CF =

Spanish football club in Salamanca

Coordinates: 40.9959°N 5.6630°W

Unionistas de Salamanca
- Full name: Unionistas de Salamanca Club de Fútbol
- Short name: Unionistas
- Founded: 26 August 2013; 13 years ago
- Stadium: Campo de Fútbol Municipal Reina Sofía
- Capacity: 4,895
- Owner: 5027 partners
- President: Miguel Ampuero López-Sepúlveda
- Head coach: Javier Medina
- League: Primera Federación – Group 1
- 2025–26: Primera Federación – Group 1, 8th of 20
- Website: unionistascf.com
Home colours	Away colours

Unionistas de Salamanca Club de Fútbol is a Spanish football club in Salamanca, in the autonomous community of Castile and León. Founded in 2013, the club plays in Primera Federación – Group 1, holding home games at Campo de Fútbol Municipal Reina Sofía with a 4895-seat capacity.

== History ==
After UD Salamanca's dissolution, a group of supporters founded Unionistas de Salamanca Club de Fútbol, a fan-based club created mainly to preserve UDS' memory. After the club's creation, famous people like Vicente del Bosque and Dani Rovira became associates. A number of British citizens resident in Spain and England are also members. The fees contributed by the members of the club are a very important part of club's budget. 2,653 people who decided to become partial owners the club, all at individual title, in season 2018–2019. During the first season following its foundation, the club played home games at the “Rosa Colorado” municipal stadium.

On 2 September 2014, Unionistas was inscribed in Primera Provincial de Salamanca, the sixth level of Spanish football. A day later it played its first official match, a 0–1 friendly loss against UD Santa Marta.

Unionistas achieved promotion to Primera Regional in April 2015, after defeating Real Salamanca Monterrey. Just one year later, it was promoted to Tercera División after defeating Onzonilla.

The first season of the club in Tercera division was successful, as it ended in the third position of the Castile and León group and qualified to the promotion play-offs to Segunda División B. The club qualified for a second attempt in the next season, after topping the group 8. This time it achieved promotion by defeating Socuéllamos in the last match, with a penalty kick scored in the 96th minute.

The first season in Segunda Division B was successful, as the team managed to finish in ninth place, avoiding relegation and qualifying for the Copa del Rey the following season.

In their debut in Copa del Rey in 2019, Unionistas reached the round of 32nd after beating Atlético Baleares and Deportivo La Coruña. In that round, they were eliminated by powerhouse Real Madrid, after losing 1–3. In the league, the season was more difficult. After first 11 league games the club was holding 19th position among 20 teams. However, the club avoided relegation after leaving the last positions and following the suspension of the league due to the COVID-19 pandemic.

In the 2023-24 season, the club made it to the round of 32 of the 2023-24 Copa del Rey after beating Gernika, Sporting de Gijón, where the club faced Villarreal on 8 January 2024.

After keeping the score to 0–0, Unionistas eventually conceded to Villarreal attacker Ilias Akhomach, but scored an 87th minute equalizer through an Alfred Planas penalty. The score remained 1–1 even after extra time, and the game went to penalties. However, due to a power outage, the stadium's floodlights failed and the penalty shootout was postponed to the following morning. In the morning's penalty shootout, Unionistas won the match with Adri Gómez scoring the winning penalty. This sent Unionistas to the Round of 16 of the competition, where they would meet FC Barcelona at home, losing 1–3 after taking the lead.

=== Club background ===
- Unión Deportiva Salamanca - (1923–2013)

== Season to season ==
Season	Tier	Division	Place	Copa del Rey
2014–15	6	1ª Prov.	1st	
2015–16	5	1ª Reg.	1st	
2016–17	4	3ª	3rd	
2017–18	4	3ª	1st	
2018–19	3	2ª B	9th	Second round
2019–20	3	2ª B	16th	Round of 32
2020–21	3	2ª B	2nd / 4th	
2021–22	3	1ª RFEF	7th	Second round
2022–23	3	1ª Fed.	7th	
2023–24	3	1ª Fed.	7th	Round of 16
2024–25	3	1ª Fed.	15th	Second round
2025–26	3	1ª Fed.	8th	
2026–27	3	1ª Fed.		TBD

- 6 seasons in Primera Federación/Primera División RFEF
- 3 seasons in Segunda División B
- 2 seasons in Tercera División

=== Detailed list of seasons ===
Season	Tier	Division	Pos	P	W	D	L	F	A	Pts	Cup	Top scorer(s)	Goal
2014–15	6	1ª Prov	1st	20	17	2	1	66	9	53		Nacho Sánchez	24
2015–16	5	1ª Reg	1st	34	27	7	0	114	27	88		Vitolo	24
2016–17	4	3ª	3rd	38	22	12	4	77	29	78		Cristo	20
2017–18	4	3ª	1st	38	25	5	8	72	34	80		Cristo	18
2018–19	3	2ªB	9th	38	12	16	10	39	37	52	Second round	Carlos De la Nava / Unai	6
2019–20	3	2ªB	16th (Note: Season curtailed early in March 2021 due to the COVID-19 pandemic in Spain.)	28	8	7	13	39	43	31	Round of 32	Guille Andrés	7
2020–21	3	2ªB	2nd / 4th (Note: Unionistas finished 2nd in the winter subgroup of their regional group (1 of 5) then 4th in the springtime 'promotion to Segunda División' subgroup and moved to the new third tier, Primera División RFEF.)	24	11	6	7	24	17	39		Carlos De la Nava	5
2021–22	3	1º RFEF	7th	38	16	13	9	55	37	61	Second round	Jesús De Miguel	12
2022–23	3	1º Fed.	7th	38	15	11	12	38	40	56		Iván Chapela	8
2023–24	3	1º Fed.	7th	38	15	13	10	40	29	58	Round of 16	Ivaylov Stankov "Slavy"	13
2024–25	3	1º Fed.	15th	38	10	16	12	42	46	46	Second round		
2025–26	3	1º Fed.	8th	38	15	11	12	53	49	56			

== Current squad ==
As of 4 November 2026.

Note: Flags indicate national team as defined under FIFA eligibility rules; some limited exceptions apply. Players may hold more than one non-FIFA nationality.

No.	Pos.	Nation	Player
1	GK	ESP	Álex Daza
2	DF	ESP	Dani Morer
3	DF	ESP	Mikel Serrano
4	DF	ESP	Ramiro Mayor (captain)
5	MF	ESP	Luis Alcalde
6	MF	ESP	Álex Gil
7	FW	ESP	Hugo de Bustos
8	MF	ESP	Juanma Lendínez
9	FW	ESP	Pau Ferrer
10	MF	ESP	Carlos de la Nava
11	FW	ESP	Álvaro Gómez

No.	Pos.	Nation	Player
13	GK	ESP	Emilio Bernad
14	MF	ESP	Alejandro Marcelo
16	DF	ESP	Gorka Rivera (on loan from Getafe)
17	DF	ALG	Abde Saidi
18	FW	ESP	Dani González
19	DF	ESP	Christian Mutilva
20	MF	ESP	Arnau Casas (on loan from Torreense)
21	DF	ESP	Retu
22	FW	CHI	Willy Chatiliez
23	DF	ESP	Diego Caballo
24	MF	ESP	Gonzalo Pastor (on loan from Famalicão)

=== Reserve team ===
Note: Flags indicate national team as defined under FIFA eligibility rules; some limited exceptions apply. Players may hold more than one non-FIFA nationality.

No.	Pos.	Nation	Player
26	DF	ESP	Eloy Alonso
27	DF	ESP	Joel Fortes
28	GK	ESP	Víctor Díez
29	MF	ESP	Asier Berzal

No.	Pos.	Nation	Player
30	DF	ESP	Ismael Hernando
31	FW	ESP	Leo López
32	MF	ESP	Hugo Martín
33	MF	ESP	Iván Casado

=== Out on loan ===
Note: Flags indicate national team as defined under FIFA eligibility rules; some limited exceptions apply. Players may hold more than one non-FIFA nationality.

No.	Pos.	Nation	Player
—	FW	USA	Stefan Witmer (at Ciudad de Lucena until 30 June 2027)

== Honours ==
- Tercera División: 2017–18

== Notable players ==
Players who have reached international status or reached 100 league matches for the club

- (Dominican Republic) Junior
- (Equatorial Guinea) David Mitogo

== Stadium ==
In its first season, Unionistas de Salamanca played its home games at Polideportivo Rosa Colorado, commonly known as La Sindical, with a capacity of 2,000 spectators.

Since 2015, the club has played its games at Pistas del Helmántico (next to Helmántico Stadium), with a capacity of 3,000 spectators.

On 11 November 2017, it was announced that a new stadium would be built in the Zurguén district, in the southern part of Salamanca. The new home of Unionistas, "Estadio Zurguén" will presumably be open for the 2019–2020 season. Roughly one year later, however, the club announced an agreement with Real Salamanca Monterrey CF and the City Council to use the Reina Sofía stadium, with a planned expansion to 5,000 spectators; the transition to the new field was concluded for the 2020–21 season, and was announced by the club on 5 October 2020.

== Rivalries ==
Unionistas de Salamanca has a strong rivalry with Salamanca UDS, formerly known as Salmantino. Both teams meet in their matches, called the derby of the 50 metres as their stadiums were separated by this distance.

While Unionistas was born as a homage of former UD Salamanca, dissolved in 2013, Salamanca CF claims it is its continuation by using their name and their shield, despite a judicial statement established it is a completely different club.
