= Marcos Leiva =

Spanish footballer (born 2005)

Personal information
- Full name: Marcos Leiva Calvo
- Date of birth: 26 March 2005 (age 21)
- Place of birth: Madrid, Spain
- Height: 1.74 m (5 ft 9 in)
- Positions: Right-back; midfielder

Team information
- Current team: Leganés B
- Number: 5

Youth career
- 2010–2016: Unión Zona Norte
- 2016–2021: Real Madrid
- 2021–2022: Levante
- 2022–2024: Leganés

Senior career*
Years	Team	Apps	(Gls)
2024–	Leganés B	34	(2)
2025–	Leganés	12	(0)
- * Club domestic league appearances and goals as of 9 June 2026

Marcos Leiva Calvo (born 26 March 2005) is a Spanish professional footballer who plays as either a right-back or a midfielder for CD Leganés.

== Career ==
Born in Madrid, Leiva joined Real Madrid's La Fábrica in 2016, from CU Zona Norte. He left the side in 2021, and played one season for Levante UD's Juvenil B squad before signing for CD Leganés.

Leiva made his senior debut with the reserves on 12 May 2024, playing the last 14 minutes of a 3–1 Tercera Federación home win over AD Torrejón CF. On 30 August of that year, he was definitely promoted to the B-team after finishing his formation.

Leiva scored his first senior goals on 9 November 2025, netting a brace for the B's in a 5–0 home routing of AD Unión Adarve. He made his first team debut on 7 December, coming on as a first-half substitute for injured Sebastián Figueredo in a 0–0 Segunda División home draw against Córdoba CF.

On 26 January 2026, Leiva renewed his contract with the Pepineros until 2027. In June, however, he suffered a knee injury.
