= Junior (footballer, born 1997) =

Dominican footballer

Personal information
- Full name: Luis Antonio Martínez Mateo
- Date of birth: 4 July 1997 (age 29)
- Place of birth: Madrid, Spain
- Height: 1.72 m (5 ft 8 in)
- Position: Midfielder

Team information
- Current team: Illescas
- Number: 20

Youth career
- 2016: Rayo Vallecano

Senior career*
| Years | Team | Apps | (Gls) |
| 2016–2017 | Alcobendas | 21 | (1) |
| 2017–2018 | Leganés B | 37 | (4) |
| 2018 | Unionistas | 9 | (0) |
| 2019 | Arenas | 13 | (0) |
| 2019–2020 | Internacional Madrid | 27 | (3) |
| 2020 | Real Murcia | 3 | (0) |
| 2021 | Internacional Madrid | 9 | (1) |
| 2021–2022 | Langreo | 32 | (3) |
| 2022–2023 | Estepona | 20 | (1) |
| 2023–2024 | Illescas | 34 | (0) |
| 2025 | CD Calahorra | 14 | (2) |

International career
| 2019 | Dominican Republic | 1 | (0) |
- * Club domestic league appearances and goals as of 20:26, 25 July 2024 (UTC)

Luis Antonio Martínez Mateo (born 4 July 1997), sportingly known as Junior, is a Spanish-born Dominican footballer who plays as a midfielder for Segunda Federación club CD Illescas and the Dominican Republic national team.

== International career ==
Junior made his debut for Dominican Republic on 24 March 2019.
