= CD Sauzal =

Association football club in Spain

Sauzal
- Full name: Club Deportivo Sauzal Sabater
- Founded: 1971
- Ground: Las Breñas, El Sauzal, Tenerife, Canary Islands, Spain
- Capacity: 2,000
- President: Eduardo Pérez
- Manager: Adrián Albéniz
- League: Primera Interinsular – Group 1
- 2025–26: Interinsular Preferente, 18th of 20 (relegated)
Home colours	Away colours

Club Deportivo Sauzal Sabater, or simply Sauzal, is a Spanish football team based in El Sauzal, Tenerife, in the Canary Islands. Founded in 1971, the club compete in Primera Interinsular – Group 1, holding home games at Campo Municipal Las Breñas, with a capacity of 2,000 people.

== Season to season ==
Season	Tier	Division	Place	Copa del Rey
1972–73	6	3ª Reg.	14th	
1973–74	6	3ª Reg.		
1974–75	6	3ª Reg.		
1975–76	6	3ª Reg.		
1976–77	6	2ª Reg.		
1977–78	7	2ª Reg.		
1978–79	7	2ª Reg.		
1979–80	7	2ª Reg.	12th	
1980–81	7	2ª Reg.	5th	
1981–82	7	2ª Reg.		
1982–83	7	2ª Reg.	8th	
1983–84	7	2ª Reg.		
1984–85	7	2ª Reg.	7th	
1985–86	7	2ª Reg.	3rd	
1986–87	7	2ª Reg.	5th	
1987–88	7	2ª Reg.		
1988–89	6	1ª Reg.	14th	
1989–90	6	1ª Reg.	10th	
1990–91	6	1ª Int.	1st	
1991–92	5	Int. Pref.	13th	

Season	Tier	Division	Place	Copa del Rey
1992–93	5	Int. Pref.	4th	
1993–94	5	Int. Pref.	6th	
1994–95	5	Int. Pref.	8th	
1995–96	5	Int. Pref.	3rd	
1996–97	5	Int. Pref.	13th	
1997–98	5	Int. Pref.	13th	
1998–99	5	Int. Pref.	19th	
1999–2000	6	1ª Int.	15th	
2000–01	7	2ª Int.	2nd	
2001–02	6	1ª Int.	1st	
2002–03	5	Int. Pref.	17th	
2003–04	6	1ª Int.	13th	
2004–05	6	1ª Int.	17th	
2005–06	7	2ª Int.	5th	
2006–07	7	2ª Int.	3rd	
2007–08	6	1ª Int.	17th	
2008–09	7	2ª Int.	14th	
2009–10	7	2ª Int.	17th	
2010–11	7	2ª Int.	18th	
2011–12	7	2ª Int.	15th	

Season	Tier	Division	Place	Copa del Rey
2012–13	7	2ª Int.	7th	
2013–14	7	2ª Int.	7th	
2014–15	7	2ª Int.	6th	
2015–16	7	2ª Int.	1st	
2016–17	6	1ª Int.	8th	
2017–18	6	1ª Int.	5th	
2018–19	6	1ª Int.	1st	
2019–20	5	Int. Pref.	14th	
2020–21	5	Int. Pref.	4th	
2021–22	6	Int. Pref.	5th	
2022–23	6	Int. Pref.	4th	
2023–24	6	Int. Pref.	9th	Preliminary
2024–25	6	Int. Pref.	11th	
2025–26	6	Int. Pref.		
