= Emilio Bernad =

Spanish footballer

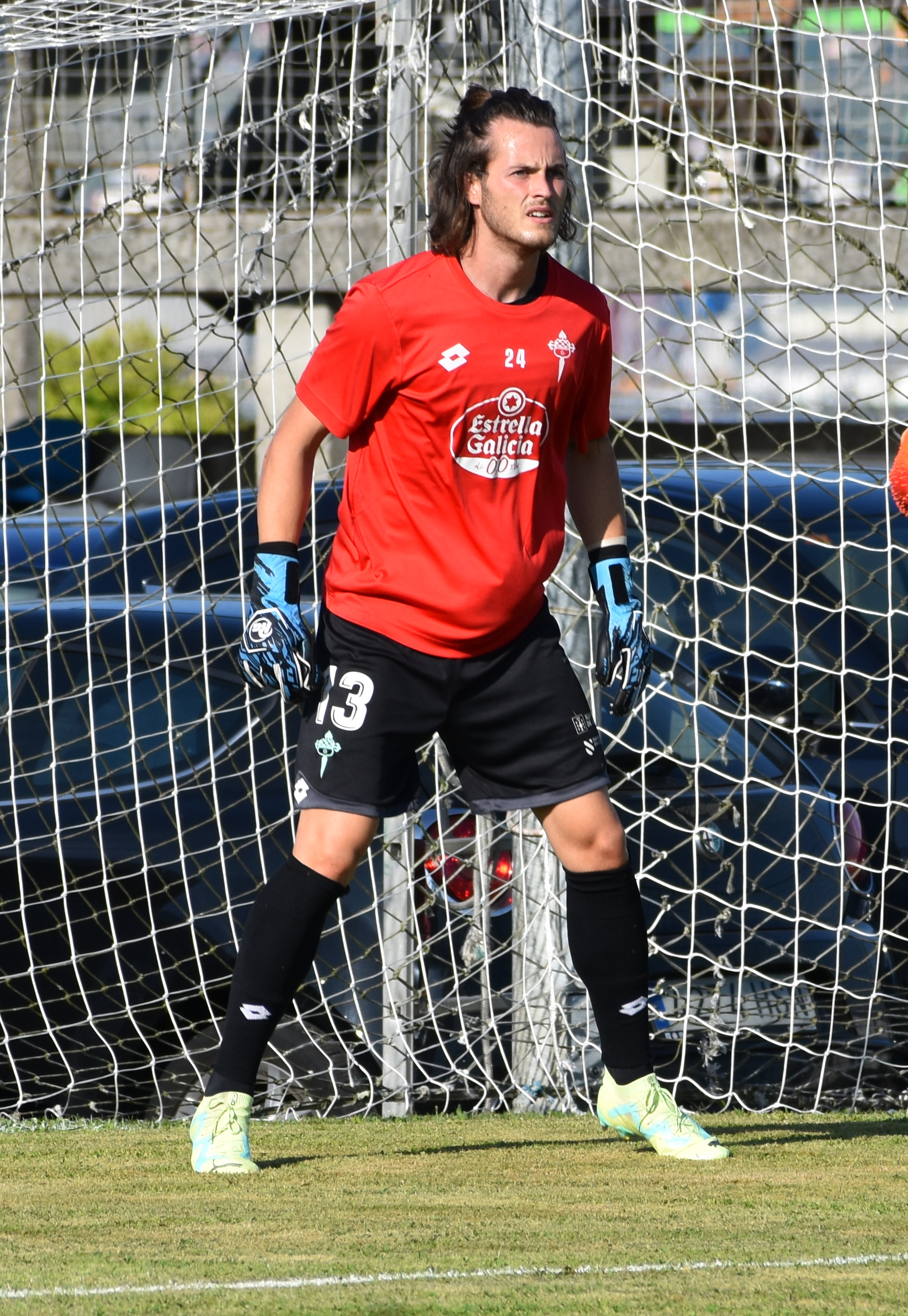
- Bernad playing for Racing Ferrol in 2023

Personal information
- Full name: Emilio Bernad Sánchez
- Date of birth: 22 September 1999 (age 27)
- Place of birth: La Vall d'Uixó, Spain
- Height: 1.84 m (6 ft 0 in)
- Position: Goalkeeper

Team information
- Current team: Barcelona B
- Number: 25

Youth career
- Peña Guzmán
- 2008–2009: Vall de Uxó
- 2009–2011: Castellón
- 2011–2018: Valencia

Senior career*
Years	Team	Apps	(Gls)
2017–2021	Valencia B	31	(0)
2021–2022	Sabadell	28	(0)
2022–2023	Valencia B	35	(0)
2023–2025	Racing Ferrol	1	(0)
2025	Teruel	0	(0)
2025–2026	Barcelona B	13	(0)
2026–	Unionistas	1	(0)

International career
2017–2018	Spain U19	2	(0)
- * Club domestic league appearances and goals as of 15 May 2026

Emilio Bernad Sánchez (born 22 September 1999) is a Spanish professional footballer who plays as a goalkeeper for Primera Federación team Unionistas de Salamanca CF.

== Club career ==
Born in La Vall d'Uixó, Castellón, Valencian Community, Bernad joined Valencia CF's youth setup in 2011, from CD Castellón. He made his senior debut with the reserves on 2 December 2017, starting in a 1–1 Segunda División B home draw against UE Olot.

A backup to Cristian Rivero during his first three seasons, Bernad shared the starting spot with Unai Etxebarria at Mestalla during the 2020–21 campaign. On 27 June 2021, he signed for Primera División RFEF side CE Sabadell FC.

On 25 July 2022, despite being a regular starter for the Catalans, Bernad returned to Valencia and their B-team, now in Segunda Federación. On 13 July of the following year, he moved to Racing de Ferrol, newly-promoted to Segunda División.

A third-choice behind Ander Cantero and Gianfranco Gazzaniga, Bernad spent the entire 2023–24 campaign without playing. Despite the departure of both, he remained behind new signings Jesús Ruiz and Yoel Rodríguez in the following year.

Bernad made his professional debut on 31 May 2025, starting in a 2–0 home loss to Sporting de Gijón, as his side was already relegated.

On 1 September 2025, FC Barcelona announced the signing of Bernard for their reserve side in the fourth-tier. This came after Bernad terminated his contract with CD Teruel, the team he had recently joined following his departure from Racing Ferrol a few months prior. He would make his debut later on that month, in a 1–0 away victory against UE Sant Andreu in the Segunda Federación.
