= Álvaro Gómez (footballer) =

Spanish footballer

Personal information
- Full name: Álvaro Gómez Martín
- Date of birth: 6 June 1997 (age 29)
- Place of birth: Salamanca, Spain
- Height: 1.79 m (5 ft 10 in)
- Position: Midfielder

Team information
- Current team: Unionistas
- Number: 11

Youth career
- Salamanca
- Valencia

Senior career*
| Years | Team | Apps | (Gls) |
| 2016–2017 | Valencia B | 0 | (0) |
| 2016–2017 | → Alzira (loan) | 27 | (7) |
| 2017–2019 | Albacete B | 56 | (3) |
| 2018 | Albacete | 1 | (0) |
| 2019–2021 | Langreo | 38 | (1) |
| 2021–2022 | Cristo Atlético | 33 | (9) |
| 2022–2023 | Alzira | 24 | (6) |
| 2023– | Unionistas | 100 | (12) |
- * Club domestic league appearances and goals as of 9 June 2026

Álvaro Gómez Martín (born 6 June 1997) is a Spanish footballer who plays as a central midfielder for Unionistas.

== Club career ==
Born in Salamanca, Castile and León, Gómez finished his formation with Valencia CF. On 19 August 2016, he was loaned to Tercera División side UD Alzira for a year.

Gómez made his senior debut on 28 August 2016, starting in a 3–3 away draw against Orihuela CF, and scored his first goal on 26 November in a 4–0 win at CF Recambios Colón. On 7 May 2017, he scored a brace in a 2–0 away defeat of CF Borriol, and finished the season with seven goals.

In the 2017 summer, Gómez moved to Albacete Balompié and was assigned to the reserves also in the fourth level. He made his first-team debut on 29 April 2018, starting in a 1–2 away loss against Sporting de Gijón in the Segunda División.

On 18 January 2024, he scored a goal in 1–3 lost match against Barcelona in the 2023–24 Copa del Rey round of 16.
