= Deportivo Murcia FC =

Association football club in Spain

Deportivo Murcia
- Full name: Deportivo Murcia Fútbol Club
- Founded: 12 May 2021; 4 years ago
- Ground: José Manuel Aroca
- Capacity: 1,000
- Manager: Antonio Serna
- League: Preferente Autonómica
- 2024–25: Primera Autonómica – Group 1, 2nd of 16 (promoted)
- Website: https://deportivomurciafc.com/
Home colours	Away colours

Deportivo Murcia Fútbol Club is a football club based in Murcia, Murcia, Spain. Founded on 12 May 2021, it plays in Preferente Autonómica, holding home games at the Campo Municipal José Manuel Aroca.

== History ==
Deportivo Murcia played their first friendly match on 12 May 2021, without attendance or even a manager. The club started to feature in a senior competition in the 2022–23 season, winning their group of the Segunda Autonómica.

Deportivo Murcia also qualified to the Copa del Rey on 15 May 2023, after defeating CD Algar in the final of the Supercopa Territorial, a tournament organized by the Football Federation of the Region of Murcia; the club became the first team from the eighth tier to qualify to the national cup in history.

== Season to season ==
Season	Tier	Division	Place	Copa del Rey
2022–23	8	2ª Aut.	1st	
2023–24	7	1ª Aut.	6th	First round
2024–25	7	1ª Aut.	2nd	
2025–26	6	Pref. Aut.		
