= Cirauqui =

Town and municipality in Navarre, Spain

Coordinates: 42°40′33″N 1°53′19″W

Cirauqui (Basque: Zirauki) is a town and municipality located in the province and autonomous community of Navarre, northern Spain.

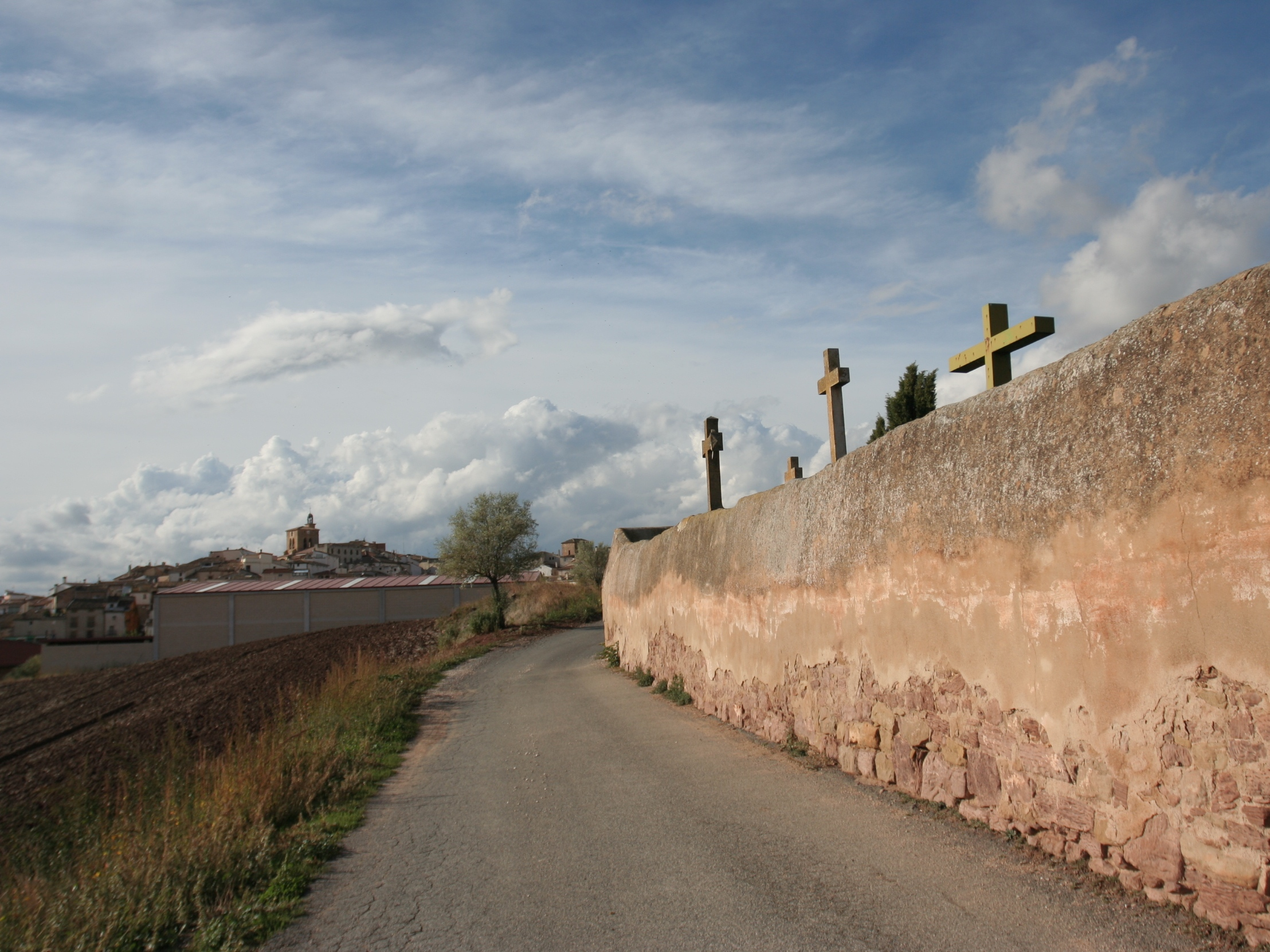
Cirauqui

Cirauqui's flag

Cirauqui's coat of arms
