= CU Zona Norte =

Unión Zona Norte
- Full name: Club Unión Zona Norte
- Founded: 1995
- Ground: Polideportivo La Cabrera, Madrid, Spain
- Capacity: 1,700
- President: Pedro Muñoz
- Manager: Jorge Mendoza
- League: Preferente de Aficionados – Group 1
- 2025–26: Primera Autonómica de Aficionados – Group 1, 16th of 18 (relegated)
- Website: https://www.cuzonanorte.com/
Home colours	Away colours

Club Unión Zona Norte is a Spanish football club based in the neighborhood of El Pilar, Madrid. Founded in 1995, they play in Preferente de Aficionados – Group 1, holding home matches at the Polideportivo La Cabrera.

== Season to season ==
Season	Tier	Division	Place	Copa del Rey
2017–18	8	3ª Afic.	3rd	
2018–19	7	2ª Afic.	1st	
2019–20	6	1ª Afic.	14th	
2020–21	6	1ª Afic.	1st	
2021–22	6	Pref.	11th	
2022–23	6	Pref.	4th	
2023–24	6	Pref.	7th	Preliminary
2024–25	6	1ª Aut.	6th	
2025–26	6	1ª Aut.		
