= Javier Rentero =

Spanish footballer

Personal information
- Full name: Javier Rentero Barberá
- Date of birth: 16 March 2001 (age 25)
- Place of birth: Madrid, Spain
- Height: 1.87 m (6 ft 2 in)
- Position: Midfielder

Team information
- Current team: Hércules
- Number: 4

Youth career
- 2015–2020: Leganés

Senior career*
Years	Team	Apps	(Gls)
2020–2023	Leganés B	74	(3)
2022–2023	Leganés	1	(0)
2023–2024	Linares	29	(0)
2024–2025	Alcorcón	31	(1)
2025–	Hércules	36	(1)
- * Club domestic league appearances and goals as of 10 June 2026

Javier Rentero Barberá (born 16 March 2001) is a Spanish footballer who plays as a midfielder for Primera Federación club Hércules.

== Club career ==
Born in Madrid, Rentero was a CD Leganés youth graduate. He made his senior debut with the reserves on 15 November 2020, starting in a 3–1 Tercera División home win over AD Parla.

Rentero scored his first senior goal on 3 February 2021, netting the B's winner in a 1–0 away success over AD Alcorcón B.

Rentero made his first team debut on 29 May 2022, coming on as a late substitute for Juan Muñoz in a 2–2 home draw against UD Almería in the Segunda División.

On 1 July 2024, Rentero signed with Alcorcón in Primera Federación.
