= Víctor Sánchez (footballer, born 2002) =

Spanish footballer (born 2002)

Personal information
- Full name: Víctor Sánchez Morales
- Date of birth: 21 May 2002 (age 24)
- Place of birth: Seville, Spain
- Height: 1.90 m (6 ft 3 in)
- Position: Forward

Team information
- Current team: Córdoba
- Number: 15

Youth career
- Tomares
- Triana

Senior career*
| Years | Team | Apps | (Gls) |
| 2019–2021 | Triana | 19 | (11) |
| 2021–2022 | Atlético Algabeño | 17 | (6) |
| 2022–2023 | Sevilla C | 29 | (10) |
| 2023–2024 | UCAM Murcia | 6 | (0) |
| 2024–2025 | Llerenense | 39 | (14) |
| 2025–2026 | Móstoles URJC | 16 | (16) |
| 2026– | Córdoba | 2 | (1) |
| 2026 | → Marbella (loan) | 12 | (3) |
- * Club domestic league appearances and goals as of 21 August 2026

Víctor Sánchez Morales (born 21 May 2002) is a Spanish footballer who plays as a forward for Córdoba CF.

== Career ==
Born in Seville, Andalusia, Sánchez represented UD Tomares and Triana CF as a youth before making his senior debut with the latter in 2019, in the Segunda Andaluza. In 2019, he joined CA Algabeño of the División de Honor, but signed for Sevilla FC on 30 January 2022, being assigned to the C-team in Tercera División RFEF.

On 8 September 2023, Sánchez was announced at Segunda Federación team UCAM Murcia CF. Rarely used, he moved to fellow league team AD Llerenense the following 24 January, but was unable to prevent team relegation.

On 29 July 2025, Sánchez agreed to a deal with CD Móstoles URJC in the fifth division. The following 2 February, after scoring 16 goals in as many matches for the club, he moved straight to Segunda División after signing for Córdoba CF, but was immediately loaned to Primera Federación side Marbella FC until June.

Back to the Blanquiverdes in July 2026, Sánchez spent the pre-season with the club, and was registered in the main squad with the number 15 jersey the following month. He made his professional debut on 16 August, starting in a 3–2 Segunda División away loss to Burgos CF.

Sánchez scored his first professional goal on 21 August 2026, netting the opener in a 2–1 home win over Girona FC.
