= Castle of Turégano =

Ancient fortress in Segovia, Spain

Coordinates: 41.1581°N 4.0053°W

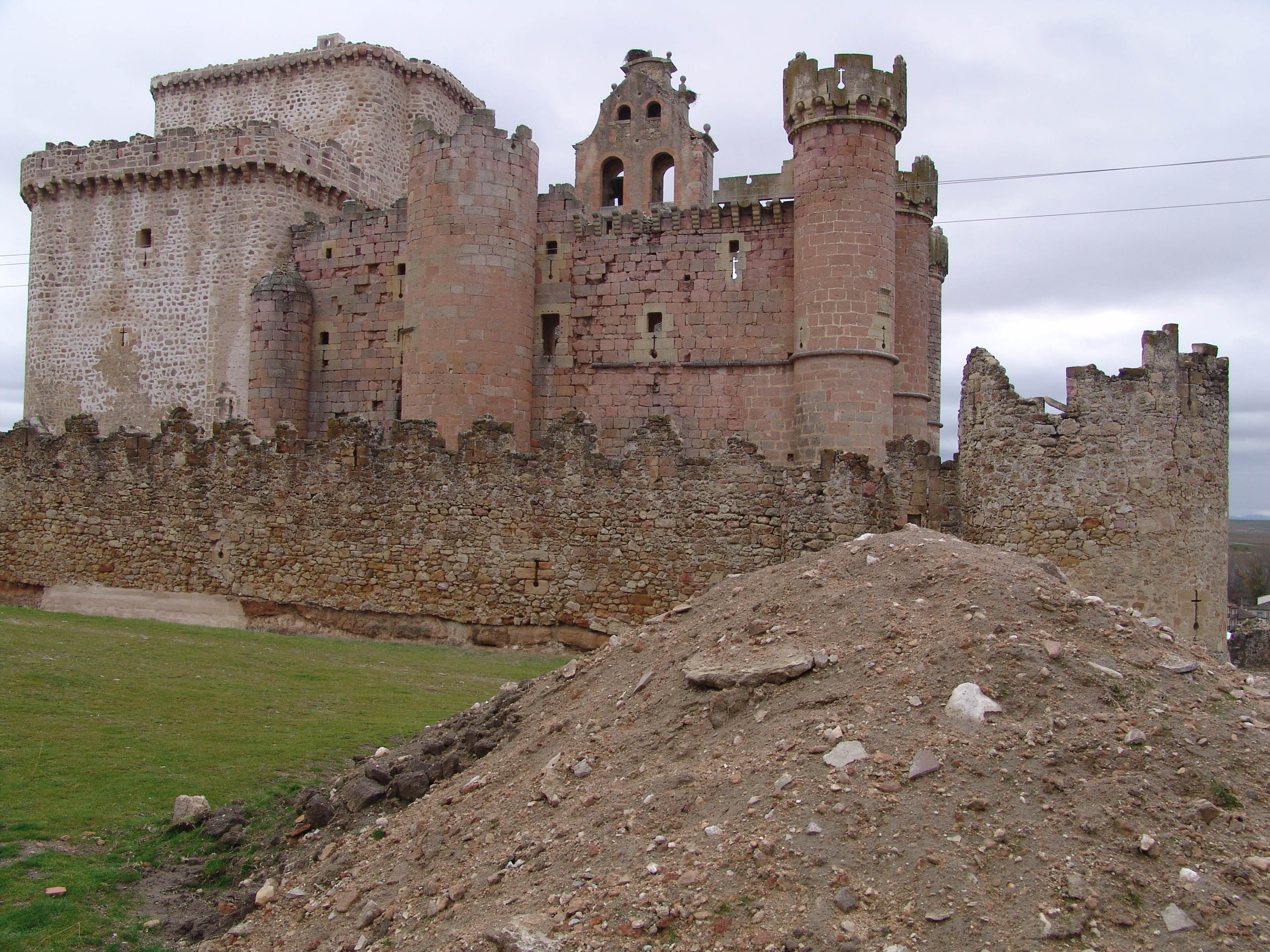
Castle of Turégano, dating from Celtiberian times.

The Castle of Turégano (Spanish: Castillo de Turégano) is an ancient fortress located in the town of Turégano north of Segovia, Spain. The castle was founded on the site of a pre-existing fortress. Its structure is integrated into the adjacent church of San Miguel.

In 1585, the castle was used to imprison Antonio Pérez, the then-disgraced secretary of king Philip II. An attempt by a group led by Álamos de Barrientos to free him from captivity here failed.

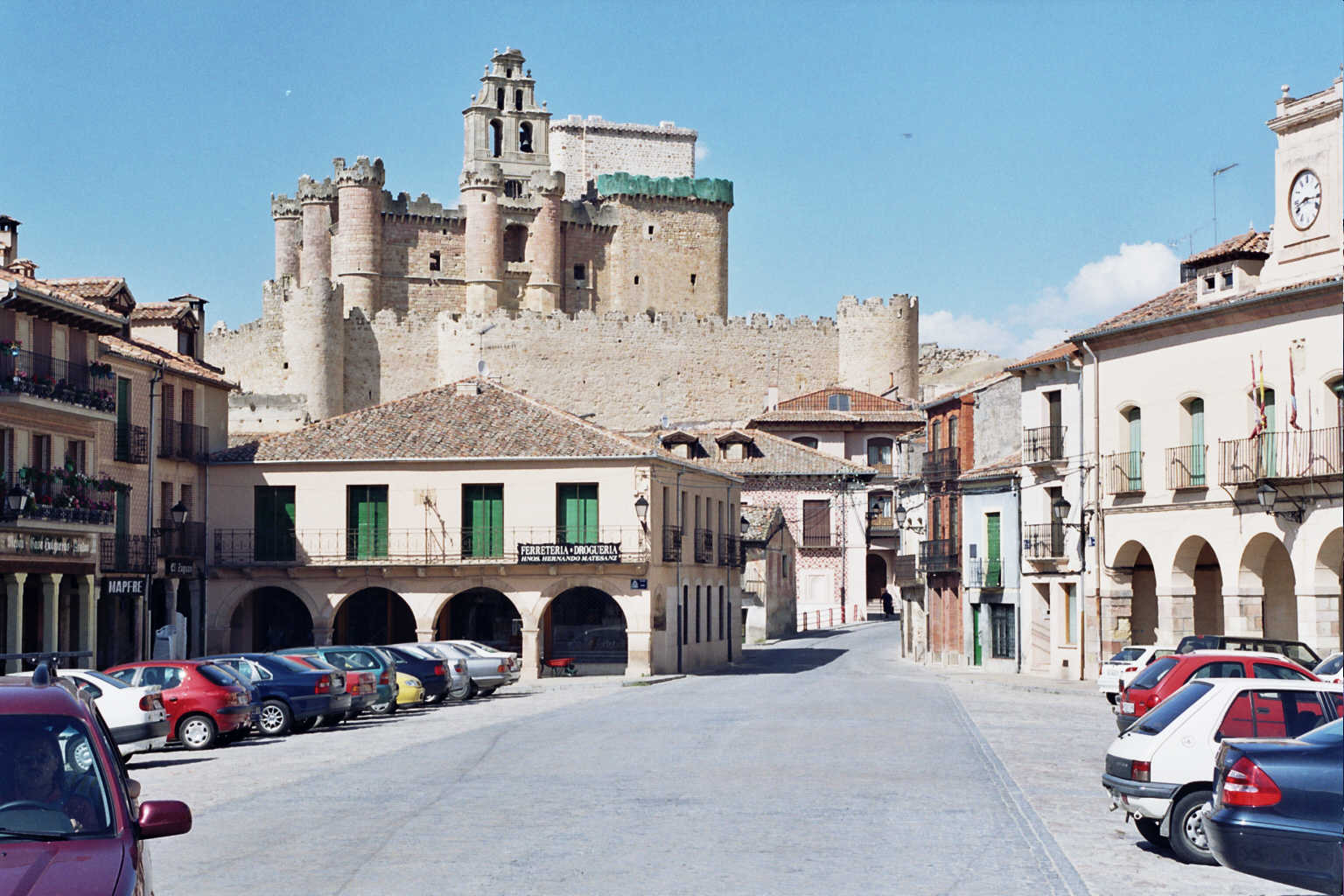
Plaza Mayor of Turégano and the castle.

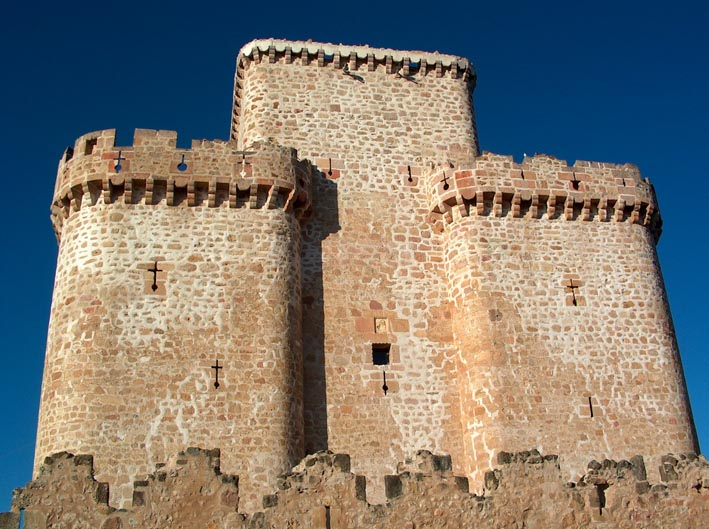
Back side of the castle.
