= Juanma Lendínez =

Spanish footballer

Personal information
- Full name: Juan Manuel Lendínez Moreno
- Date of birth: 29 July 2003 (age 23)
- Place of birth: Jaén, Spain
- Height: 1.75 m (5 ft 9 in)
- Position: Midfielder

Team information
- Current team: Unionistas
- Number: 22

Youth career
- 2012–2017: Atlético Jaén
- 2017–2018: Jaén
- 2018–2022: Granada

Senior career*
Years	Team	Apps	(Gls)
2021–2025	Granada B	78	(3)
2024–2025	Granada	5	(0)
2025–	Unionistas	31	(0)
- * Club domestic league appearances and goals as of 9 June 2026

Juan Manuel "Juanma" Lendínez Moreno (born 29 July 2003) is a Spanish professional footballer who plays as a midfielder for Unionistas de Salamanca CF.

== Career ==
Lendínez was born in Jaén, Andalusia, and joined Granada CF's youth sides in 2018, after representing Real Jaén and Atlético Jaén FC. He made his senior debut with the reserves on 12 December 2021, coming on as a second-half substitute in a 1–0 Segunda División RFEF home loss to CD El Ejido.

On 11 July 2024, Lendínez renewed his contract with the Nazaríes. He made his first team debut on 9 November, replacing Manu Trigueros in a 3–2 Segunda División home win over CD Eldense.

On 30 July 2025, Lendínez moved to Primera Federación side Unionistas de Salamanca CF.
