= Marc Montalvo =

Spanish footballer

Personal information
- Full name: Marc Montalvo Antequera
- Date of birth: 9 April 2002 (age 24)
- Place of birth: Riudoms, Spain
- Height: 1.85 m (6 ft 1 in)
- Position: Midfielder

Team information
- Current team: Gimnàstic
- Number: 8

Youth career
- 2010–2021: Gimnàstic

Senior career*
Years	Team	Apps	(Gls)
2021–2022	Pobla Mafumet	26	(0)
2022–	Gimnàstic	139	(4)

International career^{‡}
2025–	Catalonia	1	(0)
- * Club domestic league appearances and goals as of 10 June 2026 ‡ National team caps and goals as of 14:26, 19 November 2025 (UTC)

Marc Montalvo Antequera (born 9 April 2002) is a Spanish professional footballer who plays as a midfielder for Gimnàstic de Tarragona.

== Career ==
Born in Riudoms, Tarragona, Catalonia, Montalvo joined Gimnàstic de Tarragona's youth setup in September 2010, aged eight. He was promoted to the farm team CF Pobla de Mafumet in 2021, and made his senior debut on 5 September of that year, starting in a 0–0 Tercera División RFEF away draw against CF Peralada.

Montalvo made his first team debut with Nàstic on 6 February 2022, coming on a late substitute for Pedro del Campo in a 1–0 Primera División RFEF home win over Real Madrid Castilla. He was definitely promoted to the main squad on 5 July, and renewed his contract until 2026 on 16 August.

Montalvo scored his first senior goal on 29 October 2022, netting Gimnàstic's opener in a 2–1 away win over SD Logroñés. He became a regular starter for the club during the season, overtaking del Campo and new signing Ander Gorostidi, forming a duo with Eric Montes.

On 3 September 2025, after establishing himself as a first-choice, Montalvo renewed his contract with Nàstic until 2028.

== International career ==
Montalvo debuted with the Catalonia team in a friendly 2–1 win over Palestine on 18 November 2025.
