= CD Hernán Cortés =

Association football team in Spain

Hernán Cortés
- Full name: Club Deportivo Hernán Cortés
- Founded: 1950
- Ground: Municipal, Hernán Cortés, Don Benito, Badajoz, Extremadura, Spain
- Capacity: 1,750
- President: Juan Carlos Espinar Díaz
- Manager: Felipe Gallego
- League: Primera Extremeña – Group 3
- 2025–26: Primera Extremeña – Group 3, 4th of 14
Home colours	Away colours

Club Deportivo Hernán Cortés is a football team based in Hernán Cortés, Don Benito, Badajoz, in the autonomous community of Extremadura. Founded in 1950, the club play in Primera Extremeña – Group 3, holding home matches at the Campo Municipal de Hernán Cortés, with a capacity of 1,750 people.

== History ==
Founded in 1950, Hernán Cortés played for several seasons in the regional leagues until achieving promotion to Tercera División in May 2011. The club spent four consecutive seasons in the category until suffering relegation in 2015.

On 29 July 2021, Hernán Cortés became the farm team of CF Villanovense. On 30 May 2023, the club qualified to the 2023–24 Copa del Rey preliminary rounds.

== Season to season ==
Season	Tier	Division	Place	Copa del Rey
1950–51	6	3ª Reg.	5th	
1951–52	6	3ª Reg.	8th	
1952–1956	DNP			
1956–57	6	3ª Reg.	1st	
1957–58	6	3ª Reg.		
1958–59	6	3ª Reg.		
1959–60	6	3ª Reg.	5th	
1960–61	6	3ª Reg.	4th	
1961–62	6	3ª Reg.	2nd	
1962–63	5	2ª Reg.		
1963–64	6	3ª Reg.		
1964–65	7	4ª Reg.	4th	
1965–66	5	2ª Reg.	4th	
1966–67	4	1ª Reg.	3rd	
1967–68	4	1ª Reg.	3rd	
1968–69	4	1ª Reg.	11th	
1969–70	4	1ª Reg.	9th	
1970–71	4	1ª Reg.	10th	
1971–72	DNP			
1972–73	DNP			

Season	Tier	Division	Place	Copa del Rey
1973–74	6	3ª Reg.	9th	
1974–2003	DNP			
2003–04	6	1ª Reg.	15th	
2004–05	6	1ª Reg.	4th	
2005–06	6	1ª Reg.	1st	
2006–07	5	Reg. Pref.	9th	
2007–08	5	Reg. Pref.	6th	
2008–09	5	Reg. Pref.	9th	
2009–10	5	Reg. Pref.	7th	
2010–11	5	Reg. Pref.	1st	
2011–12	4	3ª	14th	
2012–13	4	3ª	15th	
2013–14	4	3ª	14th	
2014–15	4	3ª	20th	
2015–16	5	Reg. Pref.	7th	
2016–17	5	1ª Ext.	6th	
2017–18	5	1ª Ext.	4th	
2018–19	5	1ª Ext.	11th	
2019–20	5	1ª Ext.	11th	
2020–21	5	1ª Ext.	2nd	

Season	Tier	Division	Place	Copa del Rey
2021–22	6	1ª Ext.	3rd	N/A (Note: Reserve team of Villanovense.)
2022–23	6	1ª Ext.	5th	N/A
2023–24	6	1ª Ext.	4th	First round
2024–25	6	1ª Ext.	3rd	
2025–26	6	1ª Ext.		

- 4 seasons in Tercera División

== Notable players ==
- (Portugal) Jair Amador
