= Tardienta =

Tardienta, Spain
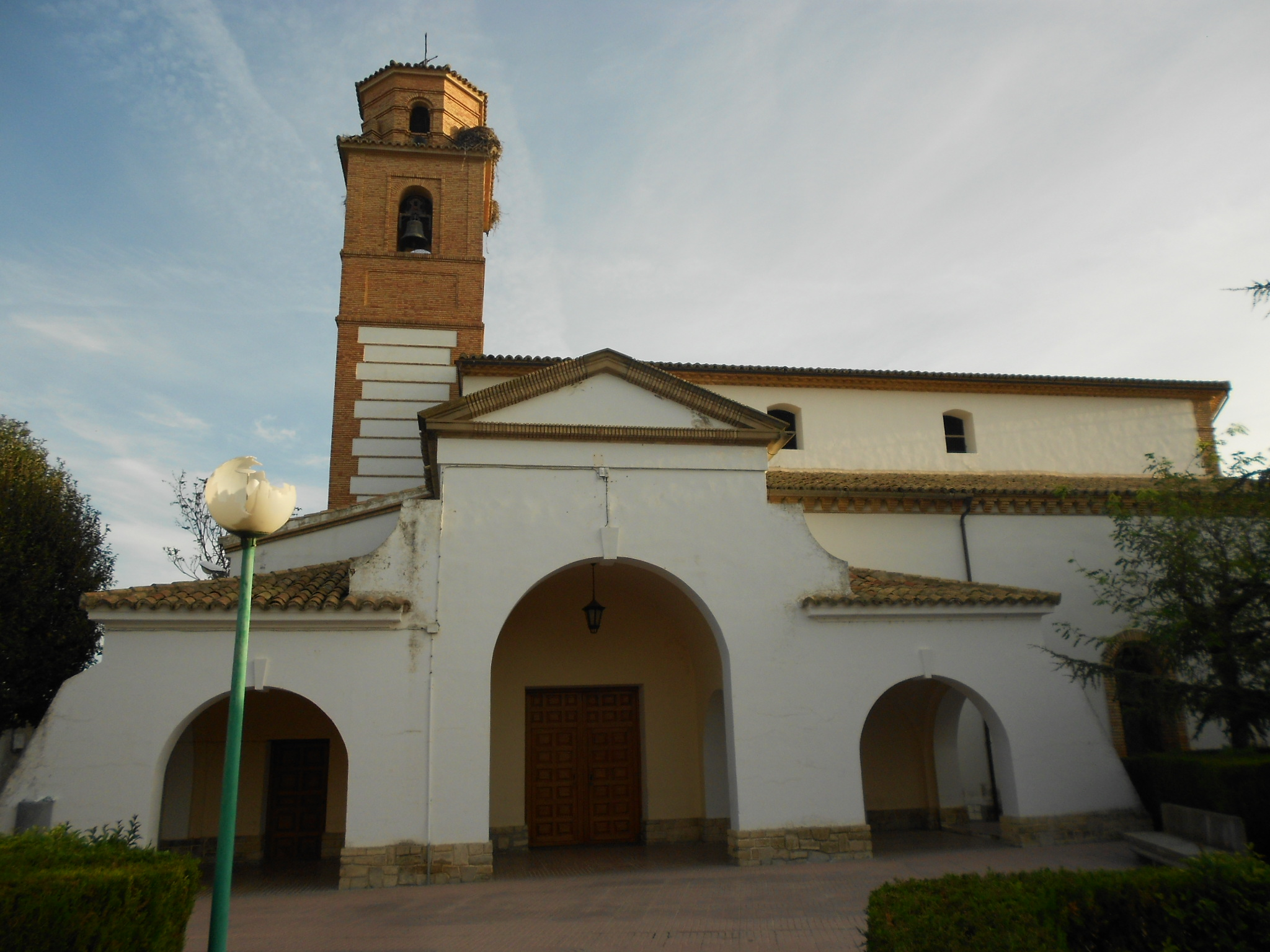
- Parish Church of Santiago el Mayor, Tardienta, Spain

- Coat of arms
- Interactive map of Tardienta, Spain
- Country: Spain
- Autonomous community: Aragon
- Province: Huesca
- Municipality: Tardienta

Area
  - Total: 90 km^{2} (35 sq mi)

Population (2025-01-01)
  - Total: 952
  - Density: 11/km^{2} (27/sq mi)
- Time zone: UTC+1 (CET)
  - Summer (DST): UTC+2 (CEST)

Tardienta is a municipality located in Huesca Province, Aragon, Spain. According to the 2004 census (INE), the municipality has a population of 1,072 inhabitants.

It is located on the Madrid–Huesca high-speed rail line.
