= Turégano =

- Municipality
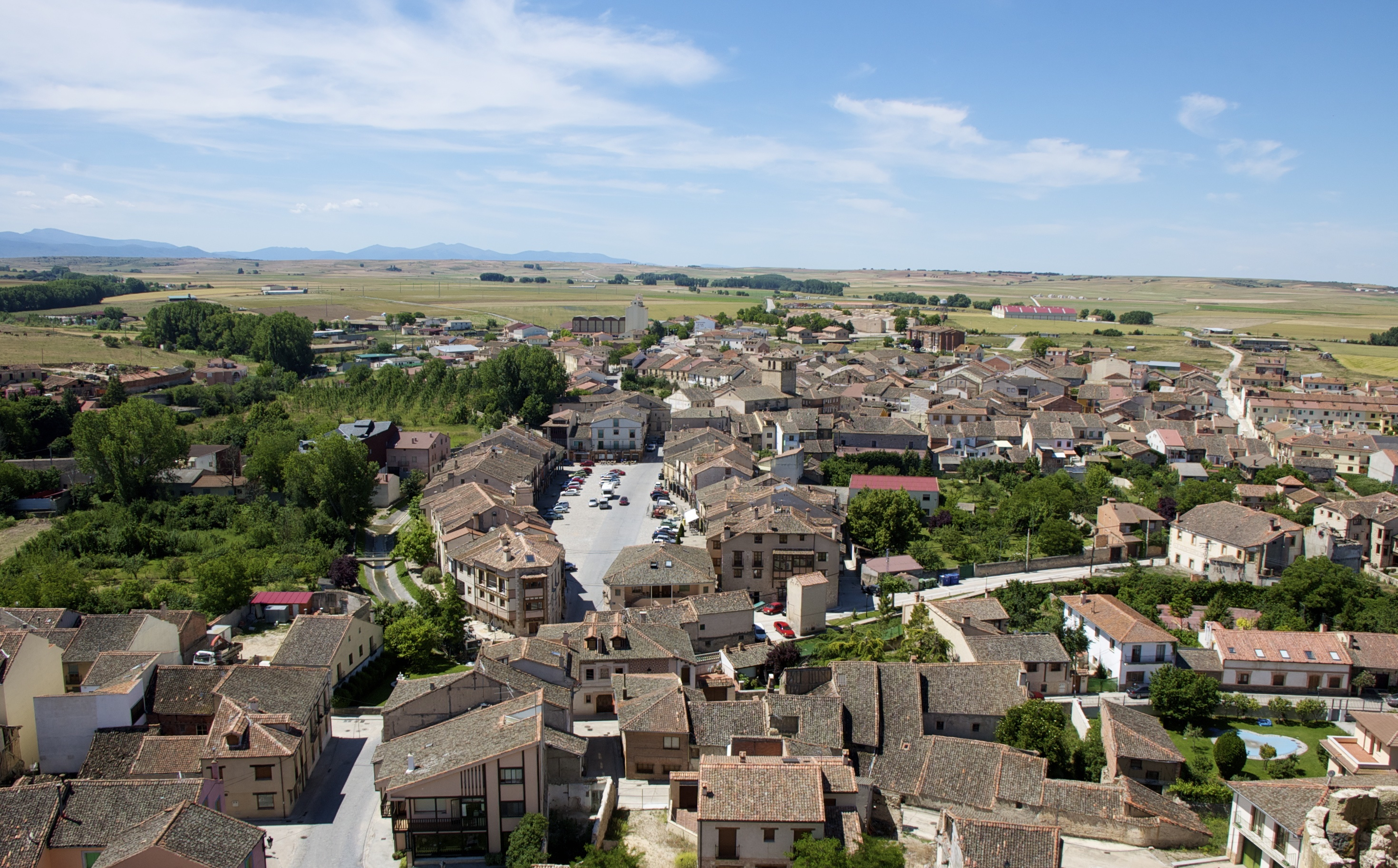

- Coat of arms

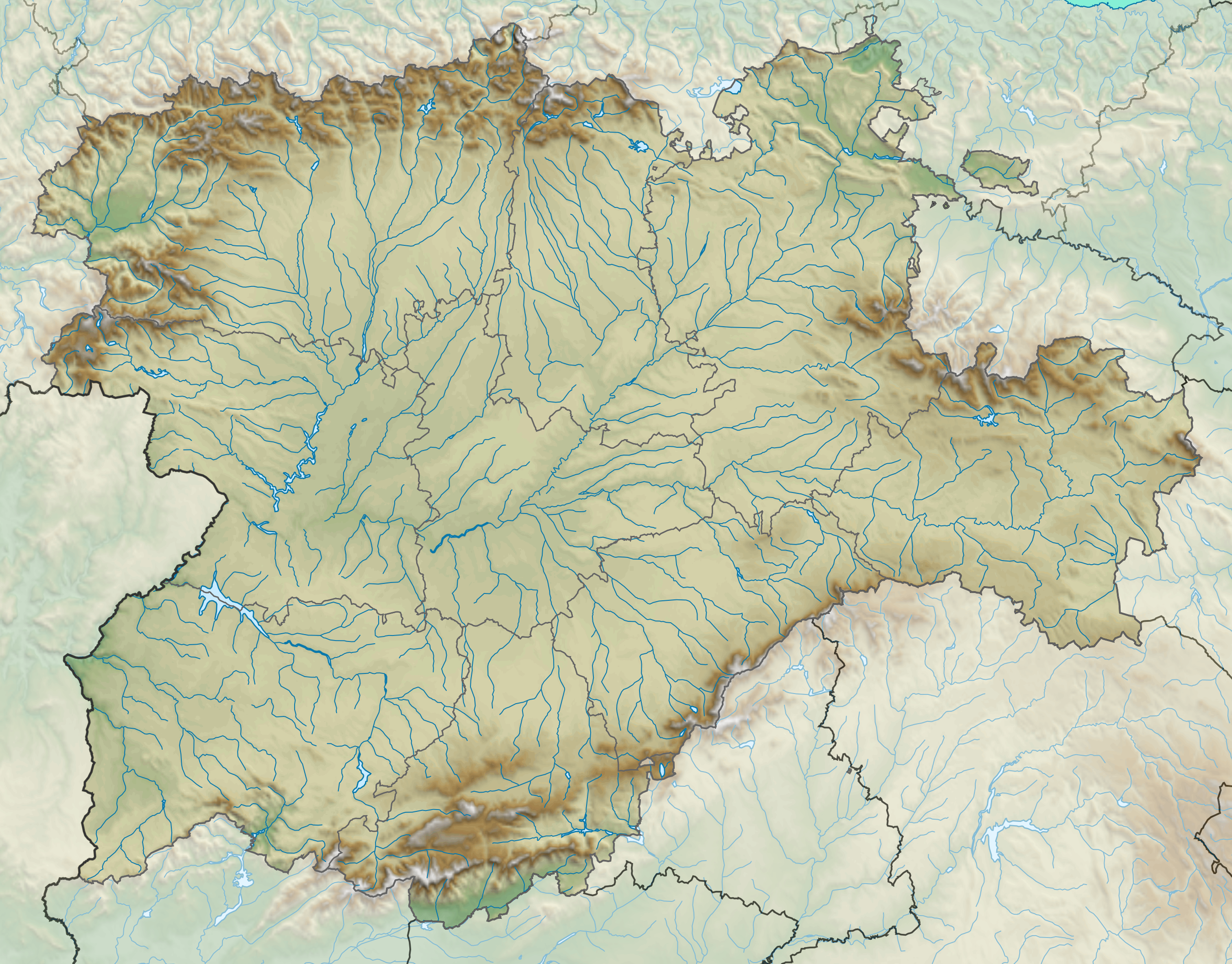
- Location within Spain Location within Castile and León
- Coordinates: 41°09′N 4°00′W
- Country: Spain
- Autonomous community: Castile and León
- Province: Segovia

Area
  - Total: 70.78 km^{2} (27.33 sq mi)

Population (2025-01-01)
  - Total: 1,007
  - Density: 14.23/km^{2} (36.85/sq mi)
- Time zone: UTC+1 (CET)
  - Summer (DST): UTC+2 (CEST)
- Website: Official website

Turégano is a village and municipality of Spain located in the province of Segovia, Castile and León. As of 2019 it has a population of 979 inhabitants. The municipality has a total area of 70,78 km^{2}. The Castle of Turégano dominates over the village.
