= 2023–24 Racing de Ferrol season =

Racing de Ferrol
2023–24 season
- President: Manolo Ansede
- Head coach: Cristóbal Parralo
- Stadium: Estadio Municipal da Malata
- Segunda División: 10th
- Copa del Rey: Round of 32
- Top goalscorer: League: Héber Pena (5); All: Héber Pena (5)
- All statistics correct as of 21 December 2023.

The 2023–24 season is Racing de Ferrol's 105th season in existence and first one back in the Segunda División, the second division of association football in Spain. They will also compete in the Copa del Rey.

== Players ==
=== First-team squad ===
As of 22 December 2023.

Note: Flags indicate national team as defined under FIFA eligibility rules; some limited exceptions apply. Players may hold more than one non-FIFA nationality.

No.	Pos.	Nation	Player
1	GK	ARG	Gianfranco Gazzaniga
2	DF	ESP	Julián Delmás
3	DF	ESP	Fernando Pumar
4	DF	ESP	Jon García
5	DF	ESP	Enrique Clemente (on loan from Las Palmas)
6	MF	ESP	Jesús Bernal
7	MF	ESP	Héber Pena
8	MF	ESP	Álex López (captain)
9	FW	ESP	Manu Justo
10	MF	ESP	Josep Señé
11	FW	ESP	Nacho Sánchez
12	DF	ITA	Luca Ferrone
13	GK	ESP	Emilio Bernad

No.	Pos.	Nation	Player
14	MF	ESP	Álvaro Vadillo
15	DF	ESP	David Castro
16	MF	ESP	Fran Manzanara
17	MF	ESP	Chuca (on loan from Miedź Legnica)
18	DF	ESP	Brais Martínez
19	FW	ESP	Sabin Merino (on loan from Zaragoza)
20	FW	ESP	Álvaro Giménez
21	DF	ESP	Moi Delgado
22	FW	ESP	Iker Losada
24	DF	ESP	Sergio Cubero (on loan from Eibar)
25	GK	ESP	Ander Cantero

== Transfers ==
=== In ===
Pos.	Player	Transferred from	Fee	Date	Source
DF	(Spain) Julián Delmás	(Spain) Málaga	Free	19 July 2023	
DF	(Spain) Moi Delgado	(Spain) Ponferradina	€35,000	27 July 2023	
GK	(Spain) Ander Cantero	(Spain) Eibar	Free	9 August 2023	

=== Out ===
Pos.	Player	Transferred to	Fee	Date	Source

== Pre-season and friendlies ==
Win Draw Loss Fixtures

19 July 2023 Friendly	Galicia de Mugardos	0–4	Racing Ferrol
20:00

22 July 2023 Friendly	Racing Villalbés	0–5	Racing Ferrol
19:00

26 July 2023 Friendly	Racing Ferrol	2–0	Ponferradina
19:30

29 July 2023 Friendly	Racing Ferrol	5–1	Pontevedra
19:30

2 August 2023 Friendly	Racing Ferrol	1–1	Oviedo
19:00

5 August 2023 Friendly	Racing Ferrol	2–1	Real Madrid Castilla
19:00

== Competitions ==
=== Overall record ===
Competition	First match	Last match	Starting round	Record							
Competition	First match	Last match	Starting round	Pld	W	D	L	GF	GA	GD	Win %
Segunda División	14 August 2023	2 June 2024	Matchday 1	21	10	7	4	29	23	+6	47.62
Copa del Rey	1 November 2023			2	2	0	0	3	1	+2	100.00
Total				23	12	7	4	32	24	+8	52.17

Last updated: 21 December 2023
Source: Soccerway

=== Segunda División ===
==== League table ====
Pos	Team	Pld	W	D	L	GF	GA	GD	Pts
8	Levante	42	13	20	9	49	45	+4	59 (Note: Levante finished ahead of Burgos, Racing Ferrol, and Elche on head-to-head points: Levante 12 pts, Burgos 8 pts, Racing Ferrol 8 pts, Elche 4 pts. Burgos finished ahead of Racing Ferrol on head-to-head points: Racing Ferrol 1–1 Burgos, Burgos 2–0 Racing Ferrol)
9	Burgos	42	16	11	15	52	54	−2	59
10	Racing Ferrol	42	15	14	13	49	52	−3	59
11	Elche	42	16	11	15	43	46	−3	59
12	Tenerife	42	15	11	16	38	41	−3	56

Updated to match(es) played on 2 Jun 2024. Source: LaLiga HyperMotion
Rules for classification: 1) Points; 2) Head-to-head points; 3) Head-to-head goal difference; 4) Goal difference; 5) Goals scored; 6) Fair-play points
(Note: Head-to-head record is used only after all the matches between the teams in question have been played)

==== Results summary ====
Overall								Home						Away					
Pld	W	D	L	GF	GA	GD	Pts	W	D	L	GF	GA	GD	W	D	L	GF	GA	GD
42	15	14	13	49	52	−3	59	10	9	2	31	22	+9	5	5	11	18	30	−12

Source: LaLiga.com

==== Results by round ====
Round	1	2	3	4	5	6	7	8	9	10	11	12	13	14	15	16	17	18	19	20	21	22	23	24
Ground	A	A	H	A	H	A	H	A	H	H	A	H	A	H	A	H	A	H	A	H	A	H	H	A
Result	W	D	W	D	D	L	W	L	W	D	L	D	W	W	W	D	D	W	L	W	W			
Position	5	6	3	5	5	8	7	10	9	9	11	10	10	7	5	6	6	5	6	4	2			

Updated to match(es) played on 21 December 2023. Source: LaLiga.com
A = Away; H = Home; W = Win; D = Draw; L = Loss

==== Matches ====
The league fixtures were unveiled on 28 June 2023.

12 August 2023 1	Elche	0–1	Racing Ferrol	Elche
22:00 CEST (UTC+2)		Report	Bernal (yellow card) 39'; Vicente (yellow card) 44'; Losada 51'	Stadium: Estadio Martínez Valero; Attendance: 14,506; Referee: Germán Cid Camacho

20 August 2023 2	Oviedo	1–1	Racing Ferrol	Oviedo
17:00 CEST (UTC+2)	Camarasa 47'	Report	Señé 32' (pen.)	Stadium: Estadio Carlos Tartiere; Attendance: 17,102; Referee: Daniel Jesús Trujillo Suárez

27 August 2023 3	Racing Ferrol	2–0	Sporting Gijón	Ferrol
17:00 CEST (UTC+2)	Héber 53'; López 86'	Report		Stadium: Estadio Municipal da Malata; Attendance: 9,010; Referee: Alejandro Quintero González

1 September 2023 4	Alcorcón	1–1	Racing Ferrol	Alcorcón
19:30 CEST (UTC+2)	Obieta (yellow card) 50'; Eteki (yellow card) 67'; Chiki (penalty missed) 70'; Sousa (yellow card) 82', (goal) 90+4'	Report	Martínez (yellow card) 58'; Losada 90+1'	Stadium: Estadio Municipal de Santo Domingo; Referee: Óliver de la Fuente Ramos

10 September 2023 5	Racing Ferrol	2–2	Villarreal B	Ferrol
16:15 CEST (UTC+2)	Héber Pena (yellow card) 22'; Carlos Vicente 52' (pen.); Iker Losada 62'; Jesús Bernal (yellow card) 73'; Sergio Cubero (yellow card) 81'	Report	Rodri (yellow card) 23'; Javi Ontiveros 31'; Abraham del Moral (yellow card) 37'; Álex Forés 60'	Stadium: Estadio Municipal da Malata; Attendance: 6,639; Referee: José López Toca

17 September 2023 6	Eibar	2–0	Racing Ferrol	Eibar
16:15 CEST (UTC+2)	Stoichkov 25'; Anaitz Arbilla 63'	Report	Héber Pena (yellow card) 31'; Sergio Cubero (yellow card) 62'	Stadium: Ipurua Municipal Stadium; Attendance: 4,722; Referee: Manuel Orellana Cid

25 September 2023 7	Racing Ferrol	1–0	Real Zaragoza	Ferrol
21:00 CEST (UTC+2)	David Castro (yellow card) 23'; Álvaro Giménez 60'	Report		Stadium: Estadio Municipal da Malata; Attendance: 6,520; Referee: Germán Cid Camacho

2 October 2023 8	Espanyol	3–0	Racing Ferrol	Cornellà de Llobregat
21:00 CEST (UTC+2)	Bare (yellow card) 37'; Braithwaite 41' 71'; Pere Milla 47'; Antoniu Roca (yellow card) 83'	Report	Julián Delmás (yellow card) 28'; Moi Delgado (red card) 28'; Nacho (yellow card) 73'	Stadium: Stage Front Stadium; Attendance: 16,577; Referee: Alejandro Quintero González

5 October 2023 9	Racing Ferrol	1–0	Amorebieta	Ferrol
21:30 CEST (UTC+2)	Carlos Vicente 35'; Álex López (yellow card) 89'	Report	Iker Seguín (yellow card) 86'	Stadium: Estadio Municipal da Malata; Attendance: 5,832; Referee: Saúl Ais Reig

8 October 2023 10	Racing Ferrol	1–1	FC Cartagena	Ferrol
18:30 CEST (UTC+2)	Álvaro Vadillo 90+3'	Report	Juan Carlos Real (yellow card) 22' (goal) 40' (pen.); Mikel Rico (yellow card) 31'; José Fontán (yellow card) 45+1'; Alfredo Ortuño (yellow card) 79'	Stadium: Estadio Municipal da Malata; Attendance: 7,032; Referee: Manuel Orellana Cid

16 October 2023 11	Levante	1–0	Racing Ferrol	Valencia
21:00 CEST (UTC+2)	Bouldini (yellow card) 22'; Dani Gómez 58'; Sergio Lozano (yellow card) 76'; Oriol Rey (yellow card) 86'; Adrián de la Fuente (yellow card) 86'	Report	David Castro (yellow card) 36'	Stadium: Estadi Ciutat de València; Attendance: 13,155; Referee: Rubén Ávalos Barrera

22 October 2023 12	Racing Ferrol	1–1	Eldense	Ferrol
14:00 CEST (UTC+2)	Héber Pena 60'	Report	Đumić (yellow card) 73'; Salcedo 81'; Lachhab (yellow card) 90+4'	Stadium: Estadio Municipal da Malata; Attendance: 6,156; Referee: Álvaro Moreno Aragón

29 October 2023 13	Racing de Santander	1–3	Racing Ferrol	Santander
21:00 CEST (UTC+2)	Álvaro Mantilla 25'; Saúl García (yellow card) 86'	Report	Josep Señé (yellow card) 24'; Carlos Vicente 35'; Héber Pena 45+2' (pen.) (yellow card) 45+4' (goal) 48'; David Castro (yellow card) 47'; Fran Manzanara (yellow card) 70'; Moi Delgado (yellow card) 75'	Stadium: Campos de Sport de El Sardinero; Attendance: 14,900; Referee: Andrés Fuentes Molina

5 November 2023 14	Racing Ferrol	1–0	FC Andorra	Ferrol
14:00 CEST (UTC+2)	Iker Losada 11'; Jesús Bernal (yellow card) 38'; David Castro (yellow card) 86'; Ander Cantero (yellow card) 90+4'; Sabin Merino (yellow card) 90+6'	Report	Álex Petxarroman (yellow card) 41'; Rubén Bover (yellow card) 43'; Sergi Samper (yellow card) 90+8'	Stadium: Estadio Municipal da Malata; Attendance: 5,318; Referee: Alejandro Quintero González

11 November 2023 15	Mirandés	1–2	Racing Ferrol	Miranda de Ebro
18:30 CET (UTC+1)	Javier Martón 48'; Pablo Ramón (yellow card) 51'	Report	Héber Pena 26'; Josep Señé 31'; Moi Delgado (yellow card) 46'	Stadium: Estadio Municipal de Anduva; Attendance: 2,951; Referee: Rafael Sánchez López

19 November 2023 16	Racing Ferrol	1–1	Burgos	Ferrol
14:00 CET (UTC+1)	Álvaro Giménez 71'; Sergio Cubero (yellow card) 84'	Report	Miguel Atienza (yellow card) 45'; Miki Muñoz (yellow card) 48'; José Joaquín Matos (yellow card) 51'; Borja González (yellow card) 58'; Álex Sancris (yellow card) 67'; Fer Niño 90+6'	Stadium: Estadio Municipal da Malata; Attendance: 6,365; Referee: Miguel Sesma Espinosa

26 November 2023 17	Leganés	2–2	Racing Ferrol	Leganés
14:00 CET (UTC+1)	Neyou 30' (pen.); Diego García 42'; Miguel de la Fuente (yellow card) 65'	Report	Iker Losada 9'; Josep Señé 15' (yellow card) 29'; Álvaro Vadillo (yellow card) 29'; David Castro (red card) 29'	Stadium: Estadio Municipal de Butarque; Attendance: 8,704; Referee: Miguel González Díaz

3 December 2023 18	Racing Ferrol	5–4	Albacete	Ferrol
18:30 CET (UTC+1)	Josep Señé 30'; Carlos Vicente (yellow card) 45+1' (goal) 71'; Sabin Merino 60' 80' 90+4'; Jon García (yellow card) 84'	Report	Manu Fuster 4'; Juan Antonio Ros (red card) 20'; Datković (yellow card) 48'; Dani Escriche 50' 90+9'; Lander Olaetxea 75' (yellow card) 83'; Antonio Glauder (yellow card) 90+4'	Stadium: Estadio Municipal da Malata; Attendance: 6,008; Referee: Jon González Esteban

10 December 2023 19	Huesca	1–0	Racing Ferrol	Huesca
21:00 CET (UTC+1)	Javi Martínez 14'; Joaquín Muñoz (yellow card) 60'	Report	Moi Delgado (yellow card) 53'; Sergio Cubero (yellow card) 58'; Jesús Bernal (yellow card) 85'	Stadium: Estadio El Alcoraz; Attendance: 3,745; Referee: Iosu Galech Apezteguía

17 December 2023 20	Racing Ferrol	3–1	Tenerife	Ferrol
21:00 CET (UTC+1)	Iker Losada 26'; Jon García (yellow card) 31' (goal) 75'; Álex López (yellow card) 47'; Álvaro Giménez 52' (pen.)	Report	Šipčić (yellow card) 51'; Ángel Rodríguez 63' (yellow card) 69'	Stadium: Estadio Municipal da Malata; Attendance: 5,831; Referee: Rubén Ávalos Barrera

21 December 2023 21	Real Valladolid	0–1	Racing Ferrol	Valladolid
21:30 CET (UTC+1)	Israel Salazar (yellow card) 45+7'	Report	Jon García (yellow card) 23'; Álvaro Giménez 39'; Héber Pena (yellow card) 45+3'; Nacho (yellow card) 90+5'	Stadium: Estadio José Zorrilla; Attendance: 13,711; Referee: Andrés Fuentes Molina

13 January 2024 22	Racing Ferrol	0–0	Espanyol	Ferrol
21:00 CET (UTC+1)				Stadium: Estadio Municipal da Malata; Referee: Manuel Jesús Orellana Cid

20 January 2024 23	Racing Ferrol	1–3	Oviedo	Ferrol
21:00 CET (UTC+1)	Losada 48'		Mascarenhas 57'; Moyano 70'; Alemão 90+14'	Stadium: Estadio Municipal da Malata; Referee: Adrián Cordero Vega

28 January 2024 24	Sporting Gijón	1–2	Racing Ferrol	Gijón
21:00 CET (UTC+1)				Stadium: El Molinón

18 February 2024 27	Racing Ferrol	0–0	Levante	Andorra la Vella
16:15 CET (UTC+1)				Stadium: Estadi Nacional

5 May 2024 38	Tenerife	v	Racing Ferrol	Santa Cruz de Tenerife
				Stadium: Estadio Heliodoro Rodríguez López

26 May 2024 41	Racing Ferrol	v	Leganés	Andorra la Vella
				Stadium: Estadi Nacional

2 June 2024 42	Andorra	v	Racing Ferrol	Andorra la Vella
				Stadium: Estadi Nacional

=== Copa del Rey ===
1 November 2023 First round	Marbella	1–3 (a.e.t.)	Racing Ferrol	Marbella
20:00 CET	Marco Tulio 71'; Alex Utrilla (yellow card) 111'	Report	Sabin Merino 43'; Fran Manzanara (yellow card) 76'; David Castro (yellow card) 79'; Álvaro Giménez 103' 116'	Stadium: Estadio Municipal de Marbella; Attendance: 1,000; Referee: (Spain) Daniel Jesús Trujillo Suárez

7 December 2023 Second round	Racing Ferrol	1–0	Leganés	Ferrol
20:00 CET	Sabin Merino (yellow card) 19'; David Castro (yellow card) 44'; Julián Delmás (yellow card) 45'; Nacho 56'; Manu Justo (yellow card) 74'	Report	Lalo Aguilar (yellow card) 21'; Nyom (yellow card) 70'; Sergio González (yellow card) 74'; Dani Raba (yellow card) 78'	Stadium: Estadio Municipal da Malata; Referee: (Spain) Rubén Campo Hernández

7 January 2024 Round of 32	Racing Ferrol	–	Sevilla	Ferrol
16:00 CET				Stadium: Estadio Municipal da Malata
