= Álvaro Giménez =

Spanish footballer

Personal information
- Full name: Álvaro Giménez Candela
- Date of birth: 19 May 1991 (age 35)
- Place of birth: Elche, Spain
- Height: 1.82 m (6 ft 0 in)
- Position: Forward

Team information
- Current team: Real Murcia
- Number: 20

Youth career
- Elche

Senior career*
Years	Team	Apps	(Gls)
2007–2009	Elche B	44	(21)
2007–2008	Elche	7	(0)
2010	Valencia B	2	(0)
2010–2011	Torrellano Illice	34	(13)
2011–2013	Mallorca B	28	(6)
2011–2013	Mallorca	13	(2)
2013–2014	Elche B	6	(1)
2013–2016	Elche	58	(2)
2016–2018	Alcorcón	61	(8)
2018–2019	Almería	39	(20)
2019–2020	Birmingham City	24	(3)
2020	→ Cádiz (loan)	13	(1)
2020–2023	Cádiz	12	(2)
2021	→ Mallorca (loan)	14	(1)
2021–2022	→ Zaragoza (loan)	34	(5)
2023–2026	Racing Ferrol	110	(24)
2026–	Real Murcia	0	(0)

International career
2008	Spain U17	3	(0)
- * Club domestic league appearances and goals as of 8 September 2026

Álvaro Giménez Candela (born 19 May 1991), sometimes known simply as Álvaro, is a Spanish footballer who plays as a forward for Primera Federación club Real Murcia.

He began his senior career with Elche and played for Valencia B and Torrellano Illice before making his top-flight debut with Mallorca. A return to Elche preceded spells with Alcorcón and Almería, with whom he was the 2018–19 Segunda División top scorer with 20 goals. He spent the first half of the 2019–20 season with Birmingham City of the English Championship before returning to Spain on loan at Cádiz. After helping them gain promotion to the top flight, his loan was made permanent. He later spent time on loan to second-tier clubs Mallorca, with whom he also gained promotion, and Zaragoza. In international football, he represented Spain at U17 level.

== Club career ==
Born in Elche, Alicante, Valencian Community, Giménez was a product of hometown club Elche CF's youth system. He made his debut for the first team on 22 September 2007 in a 1–2 away loss against Real Sociedad, and played six more Segunda División matches with the main squad in that season.

In January 2010, Álvaro signed with neighbouring Valencia CF who had already tried to acquire the player the previous year. He was assigned to the B-team, appearing rarely as they suffered relegation from the third level.

Álvaro returned to his hometown for the 2010–11 campaign, performing consistently at amateurs Torrellano Illice CF in division four. On 4 July 2011, he joined RCD Mallorca B in the third tier, being promoted to the main squad shortly after and making his La Liga debut on 29 October in a 0–5 loss at FC Barcelona.

Álvaro's first two goals in the top flight earned the Balearic Islands side four points, as he scored against Athletic Bilbao (1–1, home) and Sporting de Gijón (3–2, away) – on both occasions, he was fielded by manager Joaquín Caparrós in the starting XI. However, in August 2012, he underwent surgery to correct a pubalgia ailment, being sidelined until November.

Álvaro moved to Elche CF in summer 2013, being initially assigned to the reserves in the third division. In October, he suffered a serious knee injury which sidelined him until May 2014. He signed a new two-year deal with the Franjiverdes and was promoted to the first team. On 29 June 2016, he moved to AD Alcorcón of the second tier after agreeing to a two-year contract.

On 2 July 2018, free agent Álvaro joined another Segunda División club, UD Almería, on a two-year contract. He finished the campaign as the division's top goalscorer with 20 goals; highlights included a hat-trick in a 5–3 home defeat of his former club Elche on 12 May 2019.

Having activated Álvaro's €1.5 million release clause, English Championship club Birmingham City signed him on 6 August 2019 on a three-year contract. He had a difficult debut, coming into the visit to Nottingham Forest after an hour with his side two goals down and struggling. He started the next match, at home to Barnsley three days later, and won the ball that led to Lukas Jutkiewicz's opening goal before controlling a lofted pass from Steve Seddon on his chest and lobbing the goalkeeper to complete a 2–0 win. With no goals to show for all his hard work, by mid-November Álvaro had lost his place to Kerim Mrabti. With Jutkiewicz rested for the 27 November visit to Sheffield Wednesday, Álvaro opened the scoring in a 1–1 draw with a goal that head coach Pep Clotet hoped would restore "calm and confidence" to the player. He scored again ten days later in a win away at Reading, but soon lost form and made his last appearance for the club on 1 January 2020.

On the final day of the January 2020 transfer window, Álvaro signed for Segunda División leaders Cádiz CF on loan until 30 June, with the intention of making the move permanent. He made four first-team appearances without scoring in the month before football in Spain was suspended because of the COVID-19 pandemic. He scored in his first match after the resumption, a late equaliser at home to Rayo Vallecano, and his loan was extended to cover the remainder of the season. Cádiz achieved promotion to the top flight, duly took up their option at a fee of €2.7 million, and Álvaro signed a three-year contract.

Having begun the season in self-isolation because of contact with someone who had tested positive for COVID-19, Álvaro was not selected in the matchday squad when he did become available, amid speculation that he might leave on loan. Included on the bench for the visit of Granada the day before the transfer window closed, he came on at half-time, and within three minutes had attempted and failed with an overhead kick that ended up as an assist for Iván Alejo's equalising goal. A week later, he was a late substitute as Cádiz won 1–0 away to previously unbeaten Real Madrid to go level on points at the top of the table. On his first start, on 28 November away to Elche, Álvaro headed the equalising goal and had a second disallowed for what he felt was an involuntary handball. He opened the scoring in the next match, making sure a likely own goal crossed the line, as Cádiz went on to beat Barcelona 2–1.

Álvaro's omission from the squad to face Sevilla in January coupled with the arrival of Ivan Šaponjić, a player of similar style, served as a reminder that although Cádiz were not going to force him out, it might be in the interest of both club and player if a suitable move could be found. On 31 January, he signed for his former club, RCD Mallorca, at the time lying second in the 2020–21 Segunda División, on loan for the remainder of the season. There was no option to purchase. His first goal came from the penalty spot to complete a 2–1 win at home to Cartagena on 7 March, but it proved to be his only one from 14 appearances, mainly from the bench, as Mallorca were promoted to La Liga.

Álvaro joined another second-tier club, Real Zaragoza, on 15 August 2021 on loan for the season; the deal included a costly obligation to purchase depending on appearances and promotion. He had still not scored when, three months later, Zaragoza were awarded a penalty with five minutes left of a goalless game against Huesca. Álvaro had missed a penalty only once in his professional career; he hit the post. His first goal, an 82nd-minute winner away to Burgos on 4 November, broke the team's run of nine consecutive draws. He celebrated by hugging a supporter, and after the game used social media to try and contact the individual so that he could present him with his shirt. He scored three more goals in November, in a win and a draw that took the team seventh in the table. In the second half of the season, lack of goals from the team as a whole meant they ended up nearer relegation than the play-offs, and Álvaro was disappointed with his personal performance. In March, he said he could and should have contributed more than his five goals and three assists; in May, he apologised to the supporters for not playing to the standard he believed himself capable, said he would be lying if he claimed to have had a good season, and had no complaints about the amount of game-time the manager gave him, although he would have preferred to play with a partner rather than as a lone striker.

Back to Cádiz for the 2022–23 season, Giménez played just twice (31 minutes overall) before terminating his contract on 1 February 2023. On 25 July, after nearly six months without a club, he signed for Racing de Ferrol, newly-promoted to the second division, where he rediscovered his form. His 11 league goals and 2 in the Copa – his best goal return in five years – made him the club's top scorer and contributed 15 points to their 10th-place finish.

== Career statistics ==
As of match played 15 March 2025

Appearances and goals by club, season and competition
Club	Season	League			National cup (Note: Includes Copa del Rey, FA Cup)		Other		Total	
Club	Season	Division	Apps	Goals	Apps	Goals	Apps	Goals	Apps	Goals
Elche	2007–08	Segunda División	7	0	—		—		7	0
Elche	2008–09	Segunda División	0	0	1	0	—		1	0
Elche	2009–10	Segunda División	0	0	0	0	—		0	0
Elche	Total		7	0	1	0	—		8	0
Valencia Mestalla	2009–10	Segunda División	2	0	—		—		2	0
Torrellano Illice	2009–10	Tercera División			—		—			
Mallorca B	2011–12	Segunda División B	16	4	—		—		16	4
Mallorca B	2012–13	Segunda División B	12	2	—		—		12	2
Mallorca B	Total		28	6	—		—		28	6
Mallorca	2011–12	La Liga	12	2	2	0	—		14	2
Mallorca	2012–13	La Liga	1	0	1	0	—		2	0
Mallorca	Total		13	2	3	0	—		16	2
Elche	2013–14	La Liga	2	0	0	0	—		2	0
Elche	2014–15	La Liga	17	0	2	0	—		19	0
Elche	2015–16	Segunda División	39	2	1	0	—		40	2
Elche	Total		58	2	3	0	—		61	2
Elche Ilicitano	2013–14	Segunda División B	6	1	—		—		6	1
AD Alcorcón	2016–17	Segunda División	32	2	5	2	—		37	4
AD Alcorcón	2017–18	Segunda División	29	6	1	0	—		30	6
AD Alcorcón	Total		61	8	6	2	—		67	10
Almería	2018–19	Segunda División	39	20	0	0	—		39	20
Birmingham City	2019–20	Championship	24	3	1	0	—		25	3
Cádiz (loan)	2019–20	Segunda División	13	1	—		—		13	1
Cádiz	2020–21	La Liga	11	2	3	0	—		14	2
Cádiz	2022–23	La Liga	1	0	1	0	—		2	0
Cádiz	Total		25	3	4	0	—		29	3
Mallorca (loan)	2020–21	Segunda División	14	1	—		—		14	1
Real Zaragoza (loan)	2021–22	Segunda División	34	5	3	0	—		37	5
Racing de Ferrol	2023–24	Segunda División	38	11	3	2	—		41	13
Racing de Ferrol	2024–25	Segunda División	26	2	2	2	—		28	4
Racing de Ferrol	Total		64	13	5	4	—		69	17
Career total			375	64	26	6	—		401	70
