= Joselu (footballer, born 1987) =

Spanish footballer

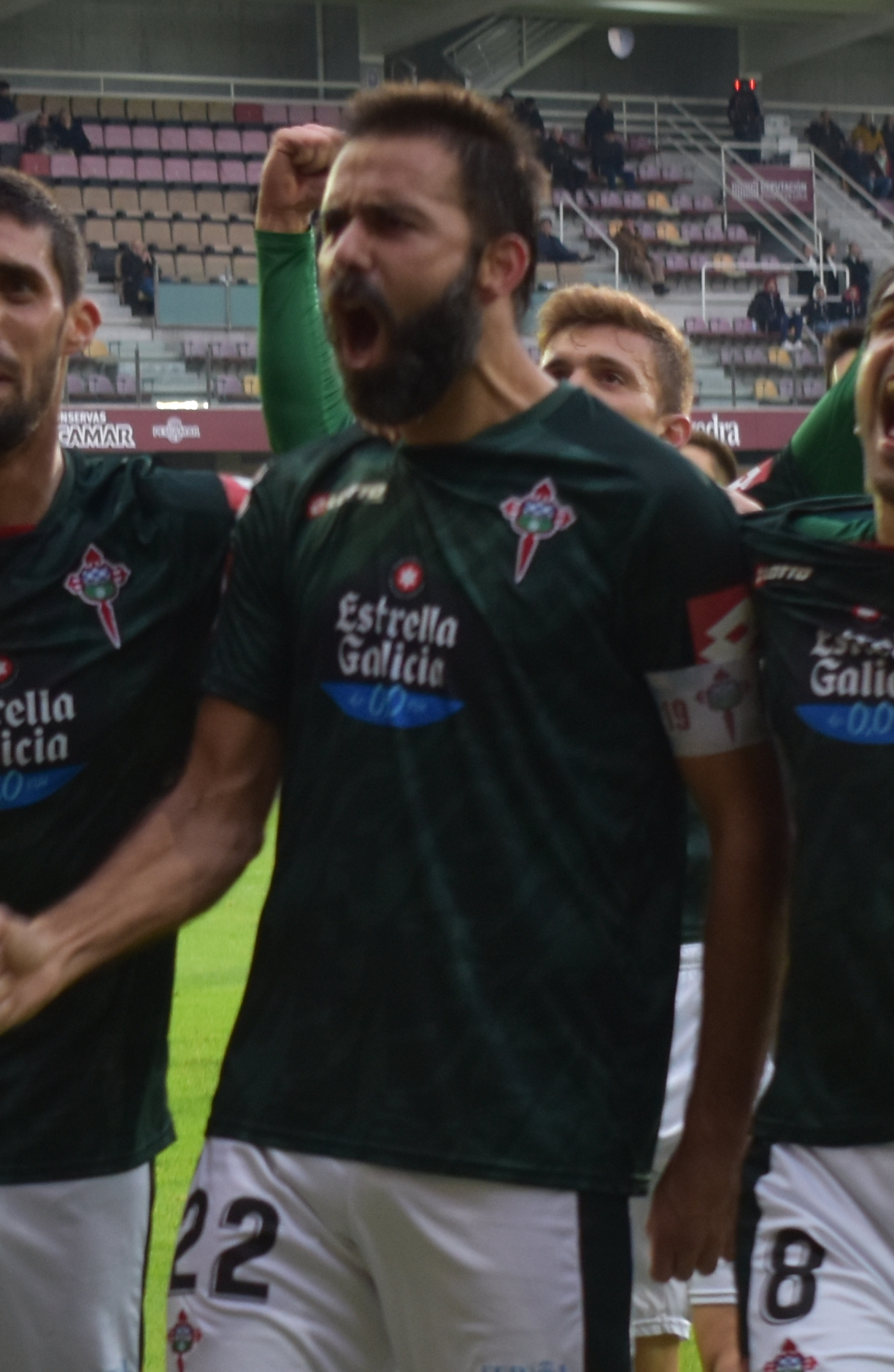
- Joselu with Racing Ferrol in 2022

Personal information
- Full name: José Luis Gómez Pérez
- Date of birth: 10 June 1987 (age 39)
- Place of birth: Ribeira, Spain
- Height: 1.87 m (6 ft 2 in)
- Position: Striker

Youth career
- 2001–2004: Celta

Senior career*
Years	Team	Apps	(Gls)
2004–2008	Celta B	61	(4)
2008–2009	Lorca Deportiva	5	(0)
2009	Reus	10	(6)
2009–2010	Teruel	40	(7)
2010–2012	Cerceda	53	(23)
2012–2014	Compostela	70	(56)
2014–2023	Racing Ferrol	278	(115)
Total		517	(211)
- * Club domestic league appearances and goals

José Luis Gómez Pérez (born 10 June 1987), known as Joselu, is a Spanish former footballer who played as a striker.

== Club career ==
Born in Palmeira, Ribeira, Province of A Coruña, Galicia, Joselu finished his development with RC Celta de Vigo, and made his senior debut with their reserves in the 2004–05 season, in the Segunda División B. On 23 August 2008, he signed with Lorca Deportiva CF in the same league.

Joselu joined Tercera División club CF Reus Deportiu on 2 February 2009. On 15 July, he remained in that tier by moving to CD Teruel.

In July 2010, Joselu terminated his contract with the Aragonese and joined CCD Cerceda in his native region, also in division four. Two years later, he signed with neighbouring SD Compostela after scoring 20 goals in a sole season.

Joselu netted 25 times in his debut campaign at Compos (which also finished in promotion), and after scoring 30 in the second, he was linked to La Liga side UD Almería, but agreed to a three-year contract at Racing de Ferrol also in the third division on 5 July 2014. He played all matches in his first three seasons at the Estadio Municipal da Malata, totalling 53 goals; in July 2016, he signed a three-year extension.

Joselu remained with the Departamentais despite their relegation to the fourth tier in 2018, and helped with 15 goals as they achieved promotion at the first attempt. On 10 June 2021, he renewed his link for another season.

On 3 April 2022, after opening a 1–1 Primera División RFEF away draw against CD Calahorra, Joselu became Racing's all-time scorer with 110 goals, surpassing Pablo Rey. After another one-year deal on 11 July, he contributed five league goals in 20 appearances – a reduced number from his previous seasons due to a degenerative knee injury– during the 2022–23 campaign, as his team returned to Segunda División after 15 years.

On 10 June 2023, his 36th birthday, Joselu retired from professional football.
