= Brais Martínez =

Spanish footballer

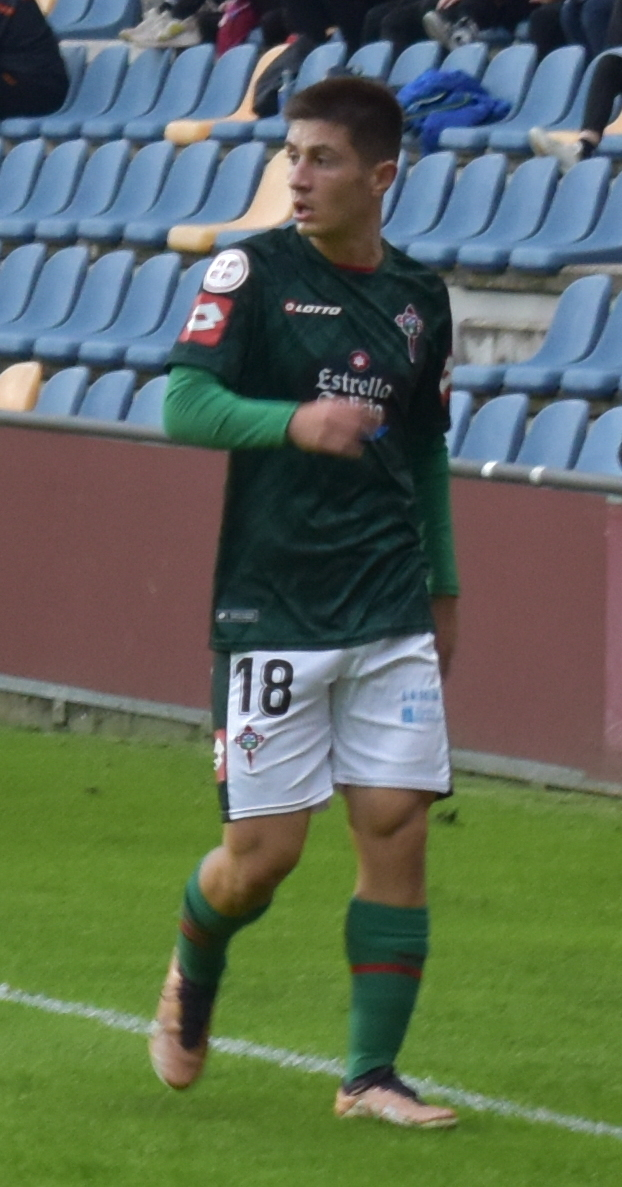
- Martínez with Racing Ferrol in 2022

Personal information
- Full name: Brais Martínez Prado
- Date of birth: 13 December 2001 (age 24)
- Place of birth: Baiona, Spain
- Height: 1.75 m (5 ft 9 in)
- Position: Left back

Team information
- Current team: Burgos
- Number: 22

Youth career
- 2015–2020: Val Miñor

Senior career*
Years	Team	Apps	(Gls)
2019–2020	Val Miñor	1	(1)
2020–2021	Alondras	27	(0)
2021–2022	Bergantiños	30	(0)
2022–2025	Racing Ferrol	72	(0)
2025–	Burgos	8	(0)
- * Club domestic league appearances and goals as of 6 June 2026

Brais Martínez Prado (born 13 December 2001) is a Spanish footballer who plays as a left back for Burgos CF.

== Club career ==
Born in Baiona, Pontevedra, Galicia, Martínez was an ED Val Miñor youth graduate. He made his first team debut on 13 October 2019, starting and scoring his team's third in a 4–3 Segunda Galicia home win over CD Nieto.

On 26 September 2020, after finishing his formation, Martínez signed for Tercera División side Alondras CF. A regular starter during the campaign, he moved to Bergantiños CF in Segunda División RFEF on 8 July 2021.

After again being a first-choice, Martínez joined Primera Federación club Racing de Ferrol on 6 July 2022. An undisputed starter after the injury of Fernando Pumar, he contributed with 28 league appearances as the club achieved promotion to Segunda División after a 15-year absence.

Martínez made his professional debut on 12 August 2023, starting in a 1–0 away win over Elche CF. On 10 July 2025, after suffering relegation, he moved to Burgos CF also in the second division on a two-year contract.
