= Héber Pena =

Spanish footballer (born 1990)

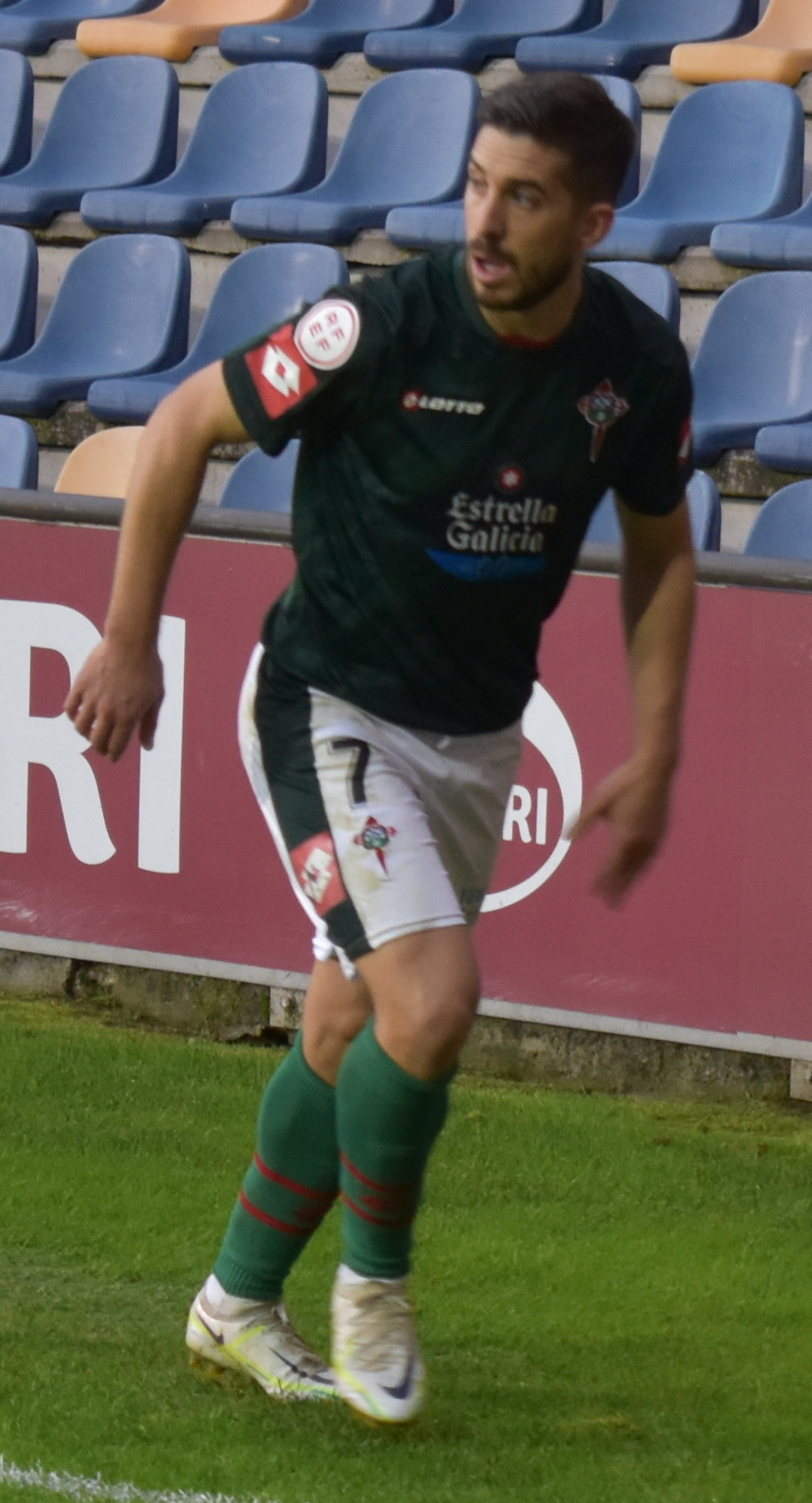
- Pena with Racing Ferrol in 2022

Personal information
- Full name: Héber Pena Picos
- Date of birth: 16 January 1990 (age 36)
- Place of birth: Ferrol, Spain
- Height: 1.76 m (5 ft 9 in)
- Positions: Winger; forward

Team information
- Current team: Estepona
- Number: 11

Youth career
- O Val
- 2007–2009: Racing Ferrol

Senior career*
Years	Team	Apps	(Gls)
2009–2013	Racing Ferrol	49	(4)
2009–2010	→ Narón (loan)	35	(4)
2013–2015	Somozas	35	(8)
2015–2016	Racing Ferrol	32	(5)
2016–2018	Racing Santander	73	(5)
2018–2019	Murcia	13	(0)
2019	Melilla	20	(7)
2019–2020	Badajoz	16	(4)
2020–2021	Sabadell	37	(1)
2021–2024	Racing Ferrol	108	(13)
2024–2025	Vizela	6	(0)
2025	Racing Ferrol	18	(0)
2026–	Estepona	15	(1)

International career^{‡}
2024	Galicia	1	(0)
- * Club domestic league appearances and goals as of 7 May 2026 ‡ National team caps and goals as of 14:26, 26 May 2025 (UTC)

Héber Pena Picos (born 16 January 1990) is a Spanish footballer who plays as either a left winger or a forward for Segunda Federación club Estepona.

== Club career ==
Pena was born in Ferrol, Galicia, and joined Racing de Ferrol's youth setup in 2007, from SD O Val. He made his senior debut during the 2009–10 season, while on loan at Tercera División side Narón BP.

Pena returned to his parent club for the 2010–11 campaign, but featured sparingly. In 2013 he moved to fellow fourth tier side UD Somozas, helping in their promotion to Segunda División B in his first season.

Pena returned to Racing Ferrol on 20 June 2015, with his side now in the third division. He continued to appear in the category in the following years, representing Racing de Santander, Real Murcia, UD Melilla, CD Badajoz and CE Sabadell FC; with the latter, he contributed with eight appearances (play-offs included) as his side achieved promotion to Segunda División.

Pena made his professional debut on 19 September 2020 at the age of 30, starting in a 1–2 away loss against Rayo Vallecano. He scored his first professional goal the following 13 March, but in a 1–2 loss at CD Castellón.

On 4 July 2024, after a three-year spell back at Racing, Pena joined Liga Portugal 2 club FC Vizela, his first move outside of Spain in his career. The following 3 February, however, he returned to his previous club for his fourth spell.
