= 2024–25 Racing de Ferrol season =

Racing de Ferrol
2024–25 season
- Head coach: Cristóbal Parralo (until 20 January); Alejandro Menéndez (from 22 January)
- Stadium: Estadio Municipal da Malata
- Segunda División: 21st (relegated)
- Copa del Rey: Round of 32
| Home colours | Away colours | Third colours |

The 2024–25 season is the 106th season in the history of the Racing de Ferrol, and the club's second consecutive season in Segunda División. In addition to the domestic league, the team is scheduled to participate in the Copa del Rey.

== Friendlies ==
=== Pre-season ===
| 20 July 2024 Friendly | Galicia Mugardos | 0–4 | Racing Ferrol |

| 24 July 2024 Friendly | Bergantiños | 0–0 (5–3 p) | Racing Ferrol |

| 27 July 2024 Friendly | Ourense | 1–0 | Racing Ferrol |

| 1 August 2024 Friendly | Racing Ferrol | 3–0 | Real Madrid Castilla |

| 3 August 2024 Friendly | AVS | 1–0 | Racing Ferrol |

| 10 August 2024 Friendly | Racing Ferrol | 2–2 (5–4 p) | Celta Fortuna |

== Competitions ==
=== Overall record ===
| Competition | First match | Last match | Starting round | Final position | Record | | | | | | | |
| Competition | First match | Last match | Starting round | Final position | Pld | W | D | L | GF | GA | GD | Win % |
|---|---|---|---|---|---|---|---|---|---|---|---|---|
| Segunda División | 17 August 2024 | 1 June 2025 | Matchday 1 | | 37 | 5 | 11 | 21 | 20 | 58 | −38 | 13.51 |
| Copa del Rey | 31 October 2024 | 3 January 2025 | First round | Round of 32 | 3 | 2 | 0 | 1 | 6 | 5 | +1 | 66.67 |
| Total | | | | | 40 | 7 | 11 | 22 | 26 | 63 | −37 | 17.50 |

Last updated: 29 April 2025
Source: Competitions

=== Segunda División ===
==== League table ====
| Pos | Team | Pld | W | D | L | GF | GA | GD | Pts | Qualification or relegation |
|---|---|---|---|---|---|---|---|---|---|---|
| 18 | Zaragoza | 42 | 13 | 12 | 17 | 56 | 63 | −7 | 51 | |
| 19 | Eldense (R) | 42 | 11 | 12 | 19 | 44 | 63 | −19 | 45 | Relegation to Primera Federación |
| 20 | Tenerife (R) | 42 | 8 | 12 | 22 | 35 | 55 | −20 | 36 | Relegation to Primera Federación |
| 21 | Racing Ferrol (R) | 42 | 6 | 12 | 24 | 22 | 64 | −42 | 30 | Relegation to Primera Federación |
| 22 | Cartagena (R) | 42 | 6 | 5 | 31 | 33 | 78 | −45 | 23 | Relegation to Primera Federación |

Source: LaLiga Hypermotion
Rules for classification: 1) Points; 2) Head-to-head points; 3) Head-to-head goal difference; 4) Goal difference; 5) Goals scored; 6) Fair-play points
(Note: Head-to-head record is used only after all the matches between the teams in question have been played)
(R) Relegated

==== Results summary ====
| Overall | | | | | | | | Home | | | | | | Away | | | | | |
| Pld | W | D | L | GF | GA | GD | Pts | W | D | L | GF | GA | GD | W | D | L | GF | GA | GD |
|---|---|---|---|---|---|---|---|---|---|---|---|---|---|---|---|---|---|---|---|
| 0 | 0 | 0 | 0 | 0 | 0 | 0 | 0 | 0 | 0 | 0 | 0 | 0 | 0 | 0 | 0 | 0 | 0 | 0 | 0 |

==== Results by round ====
| Round | 1 |
|---|---|
| Ground | H |
| Result | |
| Position | |

A = Away; H = Home; W = Win; D = Draw; L = Loss

==== Matches ====
The match schedule was released on 26 June 2024.

| 17 August 2024 1 | Racing Ferrol | 2–2 | Málaga | Ferrol |
| 17:00 | | | | Stadium: Estadio Municipal da Malata |

| 1 September 2024 3 | Deportivo La Coruña | 1–0 | Racing Ferrol | A Coruña |
| 17:00 | | | | Stadium: Estadio Riazor |

| 8 September 2024 4 | Racing Ferrol | 0–0 | Mirandés | Ferrol |
| 14:00 | | | | Stadium: Estadio Municipal da Malata |

| 15 September 2024 5 | Cádiz | 0–0 | Racing Ferrol | Cádiz |
| 18:30 | | | | Stadium: Nuevo Mirandilla |

| 21 September 2024 6 | Racing Ferrol | 1–4 | Albacete | Ferrol |
| 16:15 | Purić 72' | | Juanma 48'; Marín 78'; Rueda 90+1'; Alcedo 90+7' | Stadium: Estadio Municipal da Malata |

| 29 September 2024 7 | Córdoba | 3–1 | Racing Ferrol | Córdoba |
| 18:30 | Ruiz 43'; Casas 71'; Lapeña 84' | | Jauregi 47' | Stadium: Estadio Nuevo Arcángel |

| 5 October 2024 8 | Racing Ferrol | 1–0 | Elche | Ferrol |
| | | | | Stadium: Estadio Municipal da Malata |

| 12 October 2024 9 | Cartagena | 0–1 | Racing Ferrol | Cartagena |

| 20 October 2024 10 | Racing Ferrol | 0–0 | Huesca | Ferrol |
| | | | | Stadium: Estadio Municipal da Malata |

| 24 October 2024 11 | Burgos | 1–1 | Racing Ferrol | Burgos |

| 28 October 2024 12 | Racing Ferrol | 1–1 | Tenerife | Ferrol |
| | | | | Stadium: Estadio Municipal da Malata |

| 10 November 2024 14 | Racing Ferrol | 1–2 | Racing Santander | Ferrol |
| | | | | Stadium: Estadio Municipal da Malata |

| 16 November 2024 15 | Eibar | 2–0 | Racing Ferrol | Eibar |

| 22 November 2024 16 | Racing Ferrol | 0–0 | Levante | Ferrol |
| | | | | Stadium: Estadio Municipal da Malata |

| 27 November 2024 13 | Castellón | 0–0 | Racing Ferrol | Castellón de la Plana |

| 1 December 2024 17 | Eldense | 0–0 | Racing Ferrol | Elda |

| 8 December 2024 18 | Racing Ferrol | 1–5 | Oviedo | Ferrol |
| | | | | Stadium: Estadio Municipal da Malata |

| 15 December 2024 19 | Sporting Gijón | 1–3 | Racing Ferrol | Gijón |

| 18 December 2024 20 | Racing Ferrol | 1–4 | Almería | Ferrol |
| | | | | Stadium: Estadio Municipal da Malata |

| 21 December 2024 21 | Zaragoza | 1–0 | Racing Ferrol | Zaragoza |

| 11 January 2025 22 | Racing Ferrol | 0–0 | Cartagena | Ferrol |
| | | | | Stadium: Estadio Municipal da Malata |

| 19 January 2025 23 | Racing Santander | 6–0 | Racing Ferrol | Santander |

| 3 February 2025 25 | Levante | 0–1 | Racing Ferrol | Valencia |

| 8 February 2025 26 | Racing Ferrol | 1–3 | Castellón | Ferrol |
| | | | | Stadium: Estadio Municipal da Malata |

| 14 February 2025 27 | Mirandés | 4–1 | Racing Ferrol | Miranda de Ebro |

| 22 February 2025 28 | Racing Ferrol | 0–1 | Córdoba | Ferrol |
| | | | | Stadium: Estadio Municipal da Malata |

| 1 March 2025 29 | Huesca | 3–1 | Racing Ferrol | Huesca |

| 5 March 2025 24 | Racing Ferrol | 0–1 | Burgos | Ferrol |
| | | | | Stadium: Estadio Municipal da Malata |

| 9 March 2025 30 | Granada | 3–0 | Racing Ferrol | Granada |

| 15 March 2025 31 | Racing Ferrol | 0–0 | Eibar | Ferrol |
| | | | | Stadium: Estadio Municipal da Malata |

| 22 March 2025 32 | Málaga | 2–0 | Racing Ferrol | Málaga |

| 29 March 2025 33 | Racing Ferrol | 0–1 | Deportivo La Coruña | Ferrol |
| | | | | Stadium: Estadio Municipal da Malata |

| 7 April 2025 34 | Elche | 1–0 | Racing Ferrol | Elche |

| 12 April 2025 35 | Oviedo | 3–0 | Racing Ferrol | Oviedo |

| 19 April 2025 36 | Racing Ferrol | 1–0 | Eldense | Ferrol |
| | | | | Stadium: Estadio Municipal da Malata |

| 29 April 2025 37 | Almería | 2–1 | Racing Ferrol | Almería |
| 20:30 | | | | Stadium: UD Almería Stadium |

| 4 May 2025 38 | Racing Ferrol | v | Zaragoza | Ferrol |
| 16:15 | | | | Stadium: Estadio Municipal da Malata |

=== Copa del Rey ===
| 31 October 2024 Second round | Cuarte | 1–3 | Racing Ferrol | Cuarte de Huerva |
| 21:00 UTC+1 | | | | Stadium: Estadio Municipal Juan Guerrero El Lobo; Referee: Jon Ander González Esteban |

| 5 December 2024 Second round | Barakaldo | 1–2 | Racing Ferrol | Barakaldo |
| 20:00 UTC+1 | | | | Stadium: Estadio de Lasesarre; Referee: Eder Mallo Fernández |

| 3 January 2025 Round of 32 | Racing Ferrol | 1–3 | Rayo Vallecano | Ferrol |
| | | | | Stadium: Estadio Municipal da Malata |
