= Jesús Bernal =

Spanish footballer (born 1996)

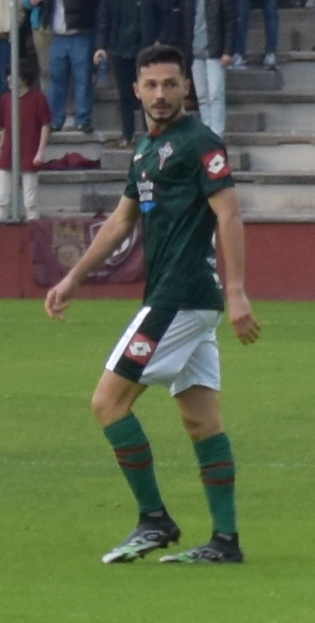
- Bernal with Racing Ferrol in 2022

Personal information
- Full name: Jesús José Bernal Villarig
- Date of birth: 25 December 1996 (age 29)
- Place of birth: Muniesa, Spain
- Height: 1.83 m (6 ft 0 in)
- Position: Midfielder

Youth career
- Santa Isabel
- 2012–2013: San Gregorio
- 2013–2015: Stadium Casablanca

Senior career*
Years	Team	Apps	(Gls)
2015–2017	Zaragoza B	36	(1)
2015–2016	→ Tarazona (loan)	21	(0)
2017–2018	Unión Adarve	37	(0)
2018–2019	Cultural Leonesa	20	(0)
2019–2020	Levante B	27	(0)
2020–2022	Rayo Majadahonda	58	(0)
2022–2024	Racing Ferrol	79	(0)
2024–2026	Sporting Gijón	29	(0)
- * Club domestic league appearances and goals as of 6 June 2026

Jesús José Bernal Villarig (born 25 December 1996) is a Spanish footballer who plays as a midfielder.

== Club career ==
Born in Muniesa, Teruel, Aragon, Bernal represented the youth sides of Santa Isabel RSD, San Gregorio CD and Stadium Casablanca. He signed for Real Zaragoza in 2015, being loaned to Tercera División side SD Tarazona on 24 September of that year.

Back to Zaragoza in July 2016, Bernal was assigned to the reserves also in the fourth division. In August 2017, after being an undisputed starter, he moved to Segunda División B newcomers AD Unión Adarve.

On 19 July 2018, Bernal agreed to a three-year contract with Cultural y Deportiva Leonesa, freshly relegated to the third tier. On 5 July 2019, he signed a two-year deal with Levante UD's reserves in the same category.

On 12 August 2020, Bernal was transferred to fellow third division side CF Rayo Majadahonda. On 4 July 2022, he joined Primera Federación side Racing de Ferrol on a two-year deal, and was first-choice during his first season as the club achieved promotion to Segunda División after 15 years.

Bernal made his professional debut at the age of 26 on 12 August 2023, starting in a 1–0 away win over Elche CF. On 27 June of the following year, he moved to fellow league team Sporting de Gijón on a three-year contract.

On 22 July 2026, Bernal terminated his link with Sporting.
