= Jon García (footballer) =

Spanish footballer

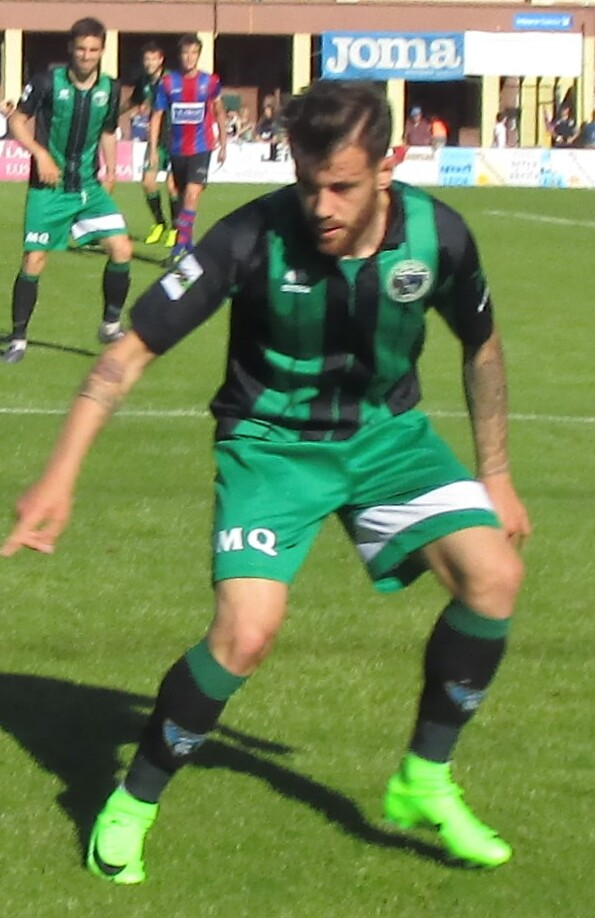
- García with Sestao River in 2017

Personal information
- Full name: Jon García Herrero
- Date of birth: 4 June 1991 (age 35)
- Place of birth: Bilbao, Spain
- Height: 1.77 m (5 ft 10 in)
- Position: Defender

Team information
- Current team: Intercity

Youth career
- 2005–2010: Athletic Bilbao

Senior career*
Years	Team	Apps	(Gls)
2009–2011	Basconia	48	(6)
2011–2014	Bilbao Athletic	72	(4)
2014–2015	Lugo	5	(0)
2016	Racing Santander	8	(0)
2016–2017	Sestao River	37	(1)
2017–2020	Ponferradina	58	(4)
2020	→ Racing Ferrol (loan)	4	(0)
2020–2024	Racing Ferrol	110	(6)
2024–2026	Albacete	38	(0)
2026	Murcia	12	(0)
2026–	Intercity	2	(0)
- * Club domestic league appearances and goals as of 16:33, 23 September 2026 (UTC)

Jon García Herrero (born 4 June 1991) is a Spanish professional footballer who plays as a central defender or a full-back for Segunda Federación club Intercity.

== Club career ==
Born in Bilbao, Biscay, Basque Country, García graduated from Athletic Bilbao's youth system, and made his senior debut with the farm team in the 2009–10 season, in the Tercera División. In June 2011, he was promoted to the reserves who competed in the Segunda División B.

García was released by Athletic on 26 May 2014, and signed with CD Lugo on 7 July. He made his professional debut on 11 September, starting the 1–0 home win against AD Alcorcón in the second round of the Copa del Rey. He played his first Segunda División game on 18 October, featuring the full 90 minutes in a 1–0 loss away to Deportivo Alavés.

In February 2015, García suffered an anterior cruciate ligament injury, being successfully operated the following month. The following January, after making a full recovery, he joined Racing de Santander.

García continued competing in the third tier the following years, representing Sestao River Club and SD Ponferradina. While at the service of the latter club, he suffered another serious knee ailment.

Late into the 2020 January transfer window, García was loaned to Racing de Ferrol of the same league. Upon returning to Ponfe, he terminated his contract on 3 September and rejoined his previous employers three days later.

García helped Racing return to the second division at the end of the 2022–23 campaign, and scored his first professional goal on 17 December 2023 when he closed in the 3–1 home victory over CD Tenerife. On 5 July 2024, he signed a two-year contract with Albacete Balompié in the same tier.

On 1 February 2026, García left the Estadio Carlos Belmonte. The following day, the 34-year-old joined Primera Federación club Real Murcia CF.
