= SD O Val =

Spanish football club

O Val
- Full name: Sociedad Deportiva O Val
- Founded: 1976; 50 years ago
- Stadium: Sinde-O Val
- Capacity: 1,000
- President: Félix Serantes
- Head coach: Quillo
- League: Primera Futgal – Group 1
- 2025–26: Preferente Futgal – Group 1, 17th of 18 (relegated)
Home colours	Away colours

Sociedade Deportiva O Val is a football team based in Narón, A Coruña, in the autonomous community of Galicia. Founded in 1976, it currently plays in Primera Futgal – Group 1. Their stadium is Sinde-O Val.

== Season to season ==
Season	Tier	Division	Place	Copa del Rey
1976–77	5	1ª Reg.	10th	
1977–78	6	1ª Reg.	8th	
1978–79	7	2ª Reg.	3rd	
1979–80	7	2ª Reg.		
1980–81	7	2ª Reg.	3rd	
1981–82	7	2ª Reg.		
1982–83	6	1ª Reg.	8th	
1983–84	6	1ª Reg.	8th	
1984–85	6	1ª Reg.	8th	
1985–86	6	1ª Reg.	7th	
1986–87	6	1ª Reg.	3rd	
1987–88	6	1ª Reg.	7th	
1988–89	6	1ª Reg.	4th	
1989–90	6	1ª Reg.	7th	
1990–91	6	1ª Reg.	6th	
1991–92	7	2ª Reg.	1st	
1992–93	6	1ª Reg.	10th	
1993–94	6	1ª Reg.	11th	
1994–95	6	1ª Reg.	16th	
1995–96	6	1ª Reg.	9th	

Season	Tier	Division	Place	Copa del Rey
1996–97	6	1ª Reg.	11th	
1997–98	6	1ª Reg.	1st	
1998–99	5	Reg. Pref.	8th	
1999–2000	5	Reg. Pref.	16th	
2000–01	5	Reg. Pref.	10th	
2001–02	5	Reg. Pref.	5th	
2002–03	5	Reg. Pref.	4th	
2003–04	5	Reg. Pref.	1st	
2004–05	4	3ª	17th	
2005–06	4	3ª	19th	
2006–07	5	Pref. Aut.	12th	
2007–08	5	Pref. Aut.	18th	
2008–09	6	1ª Aut.	3rd	
2009–10	5	Pref. Aut.	5th	
2010–11	5	Pref. Aut.	4th	
2011–12	5	Pref. Aut.	7th	
2012–13	5	Pref. Aut.	8th	
2013–14	5	Pref. Aut.	15th	
2014–15	5	Pref. Aut.	14th	
2015–16	5	Pref.	20th	

Season	Tier	Division	Place	Copa del Rey
2016–17	6	1ª Gal.	4th	
2017–18	6	1ª Gal.	12th	
2018–19	6	1ª Gal.	13th	
2019–20	6	1ª Gal.	17th	
2020–21	DNP			
2021–22	7	1ª Gal.	5th	
2022–23	7	1ª Gal.	4th	
2023–24	7	1ª Gal.	1st	
2024–25	6	Pref. Futgal	14th	
2025–26	6	Pref. Futgal		

- 2 seasons in Tercera División
