= Muniesa =

- municipality
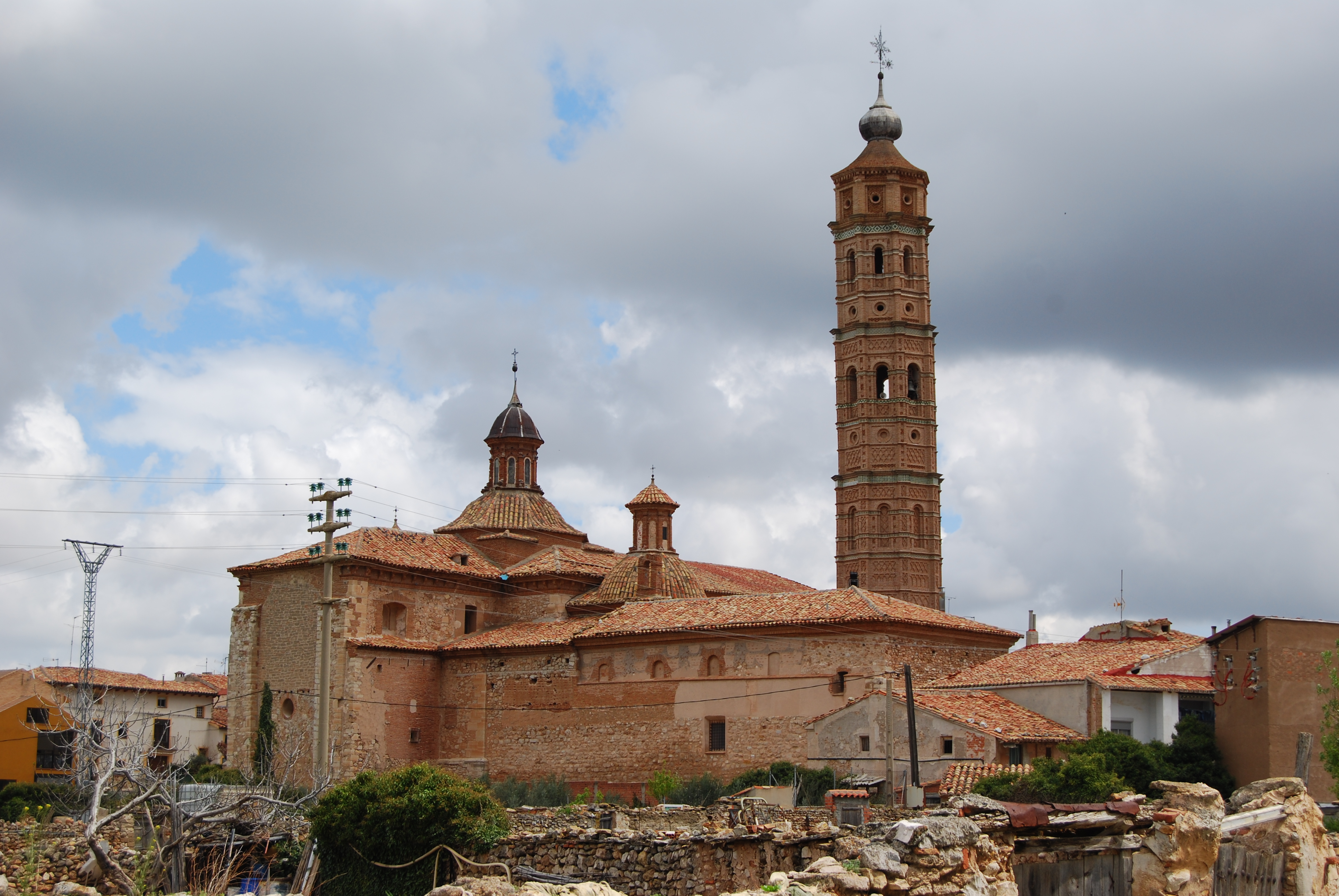
- View of the main church in the village

- Flag Coat of arms
- Interactive map of Muniesa
- Coordinates: 41°02′N 0°48′W
- Country: Spain
- Autonomous community: Aragon
- Province: Teruel
- Municipality: Muniesa

Area
  - Total: 129.80 km^{2} (50.12 sq mi)
- Elevation: 782 m (2,566 ft)

Population (2025-01-01)
  - Total: 575
  - Density: 4.43/km^{2} (11.5/sq mi)
- Time zone: UTC+1 (CET)
  - Summer (DST): UTC+2 (CEST)
- Website: /muniesa.org

Muniesa is a municipality in the Teruel province of Aragon, Spain. In the 2017 INE census, its population is 630.

== See also ==
- List of municipalities in Teruel

== Gallery ==
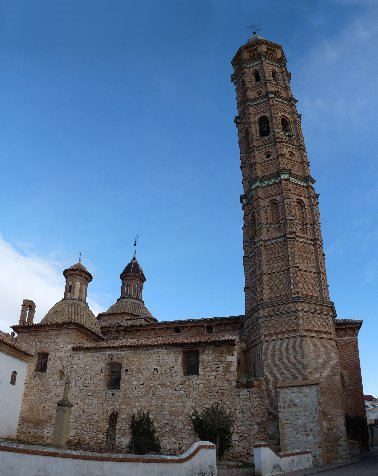
Nuestra Señora de la Asunción church

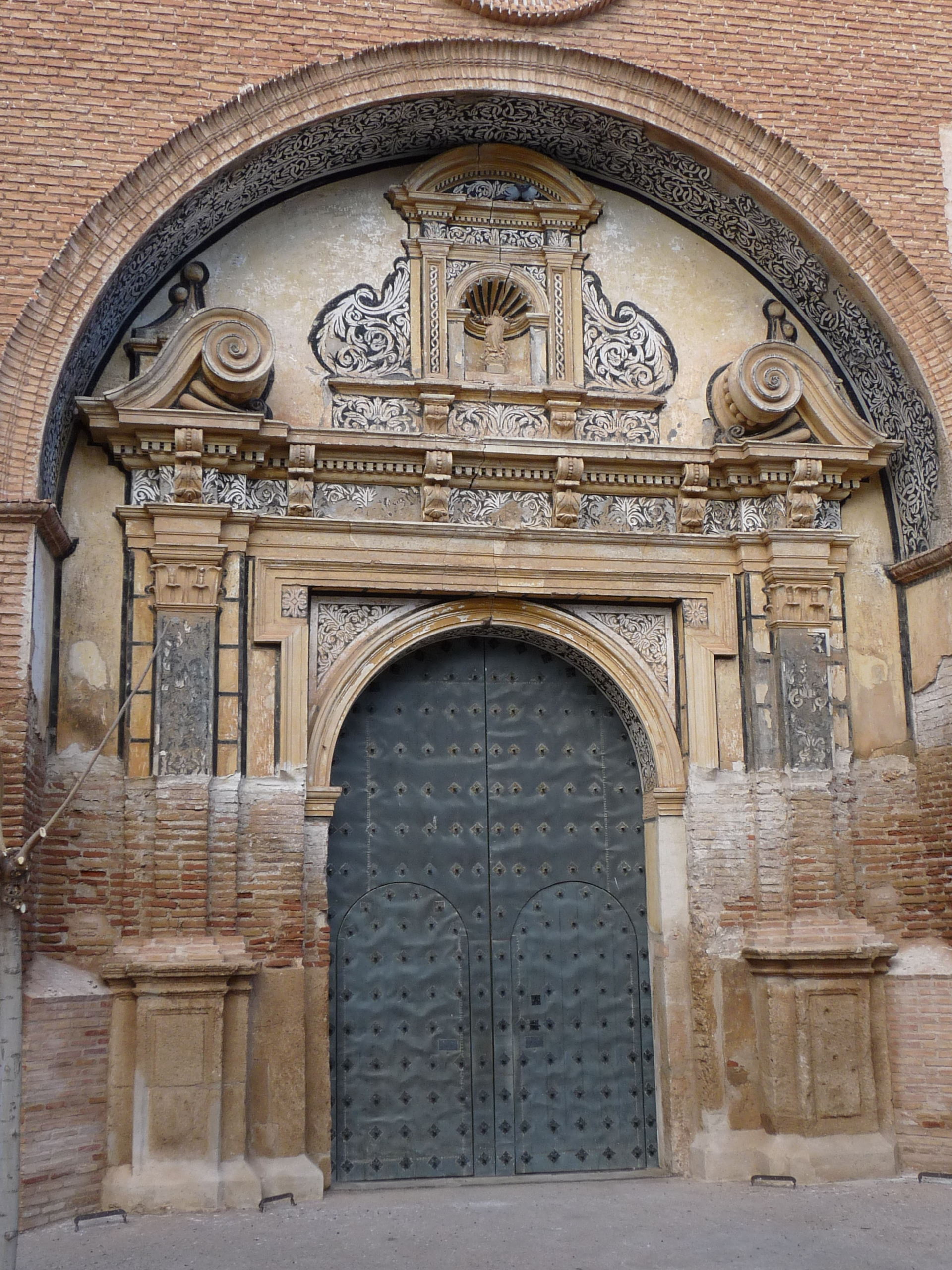
main door of the church

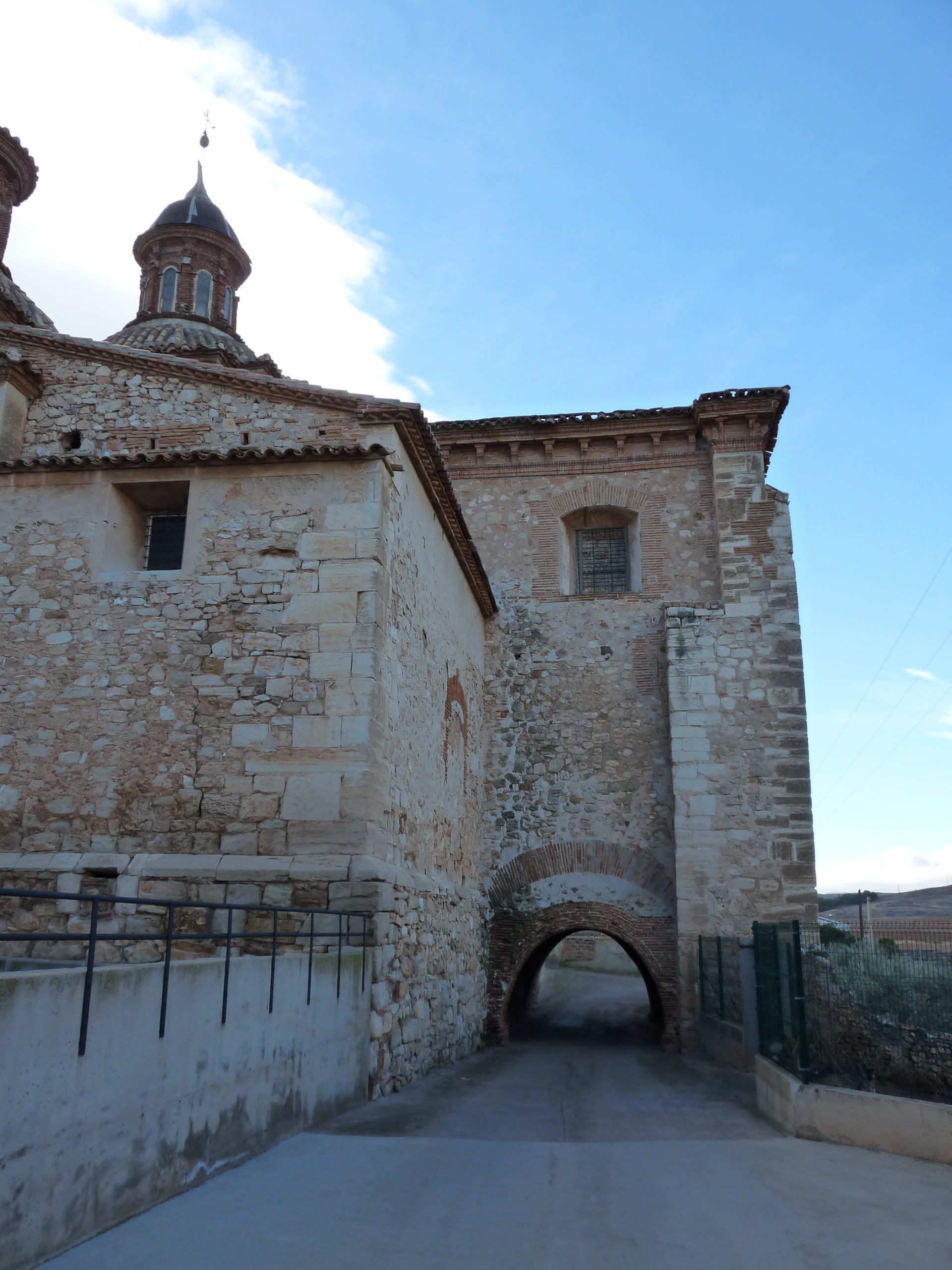
apse of the church exterior view

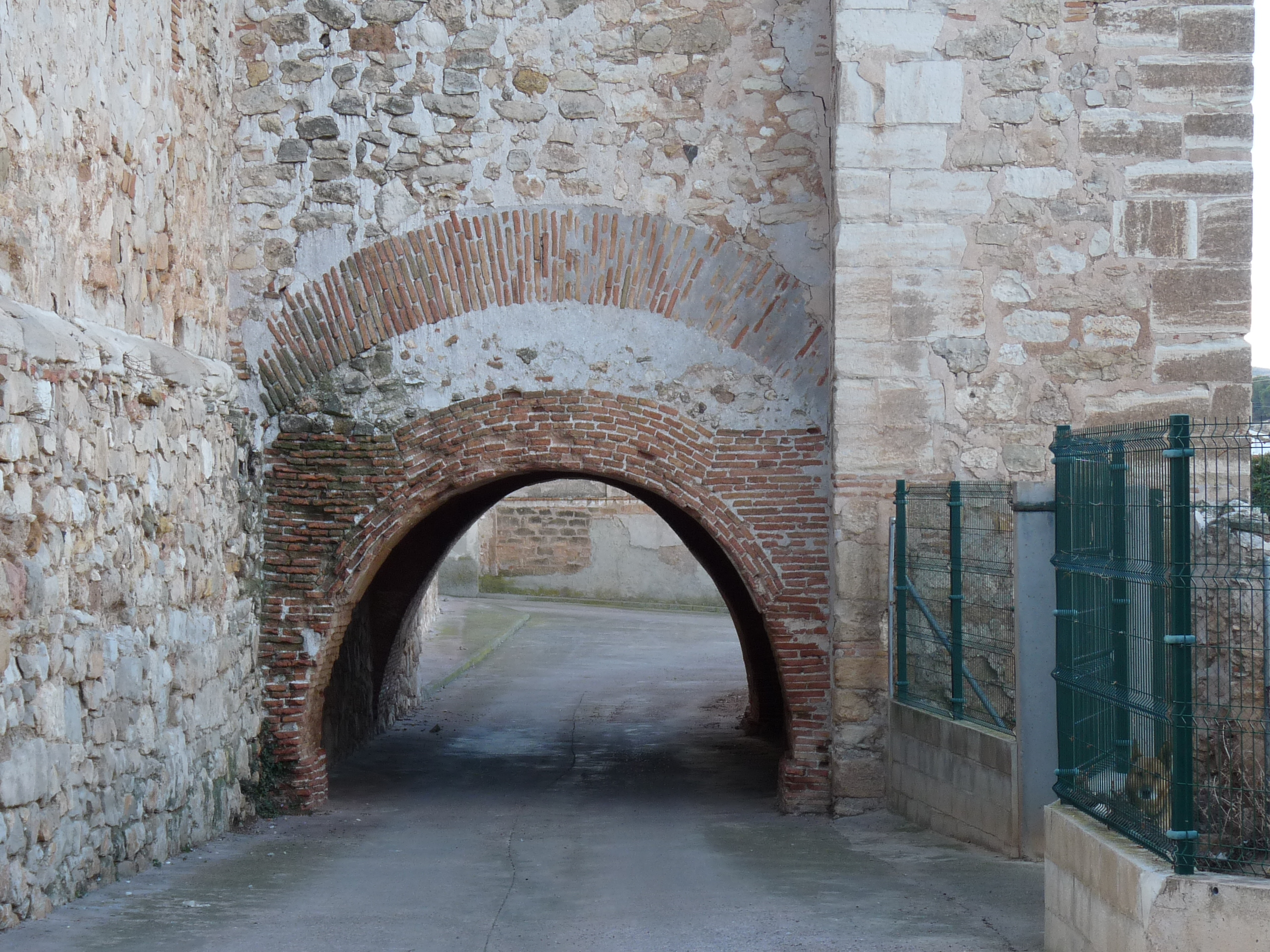
tunnel under the apse

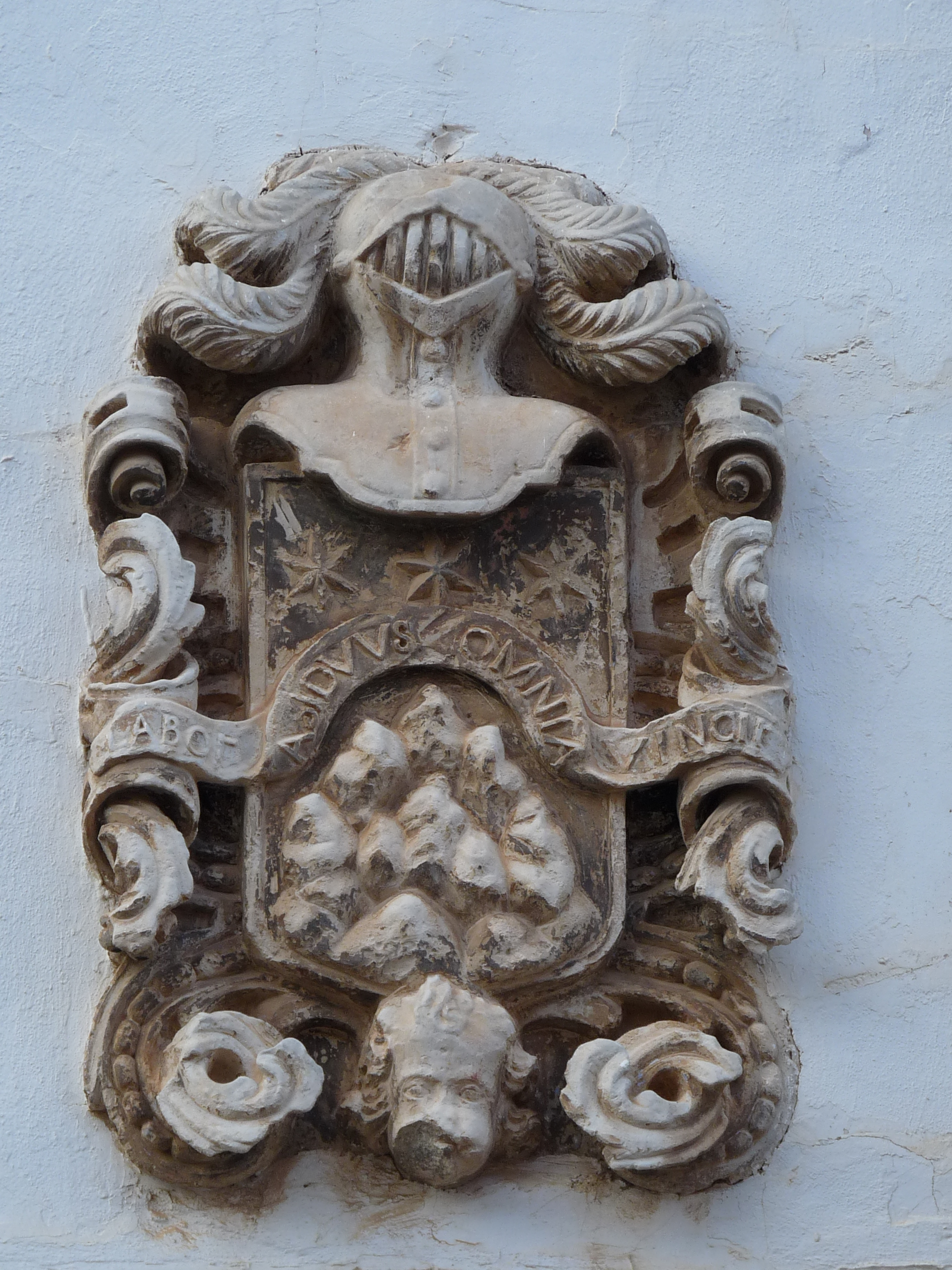
shield on the façade of a house

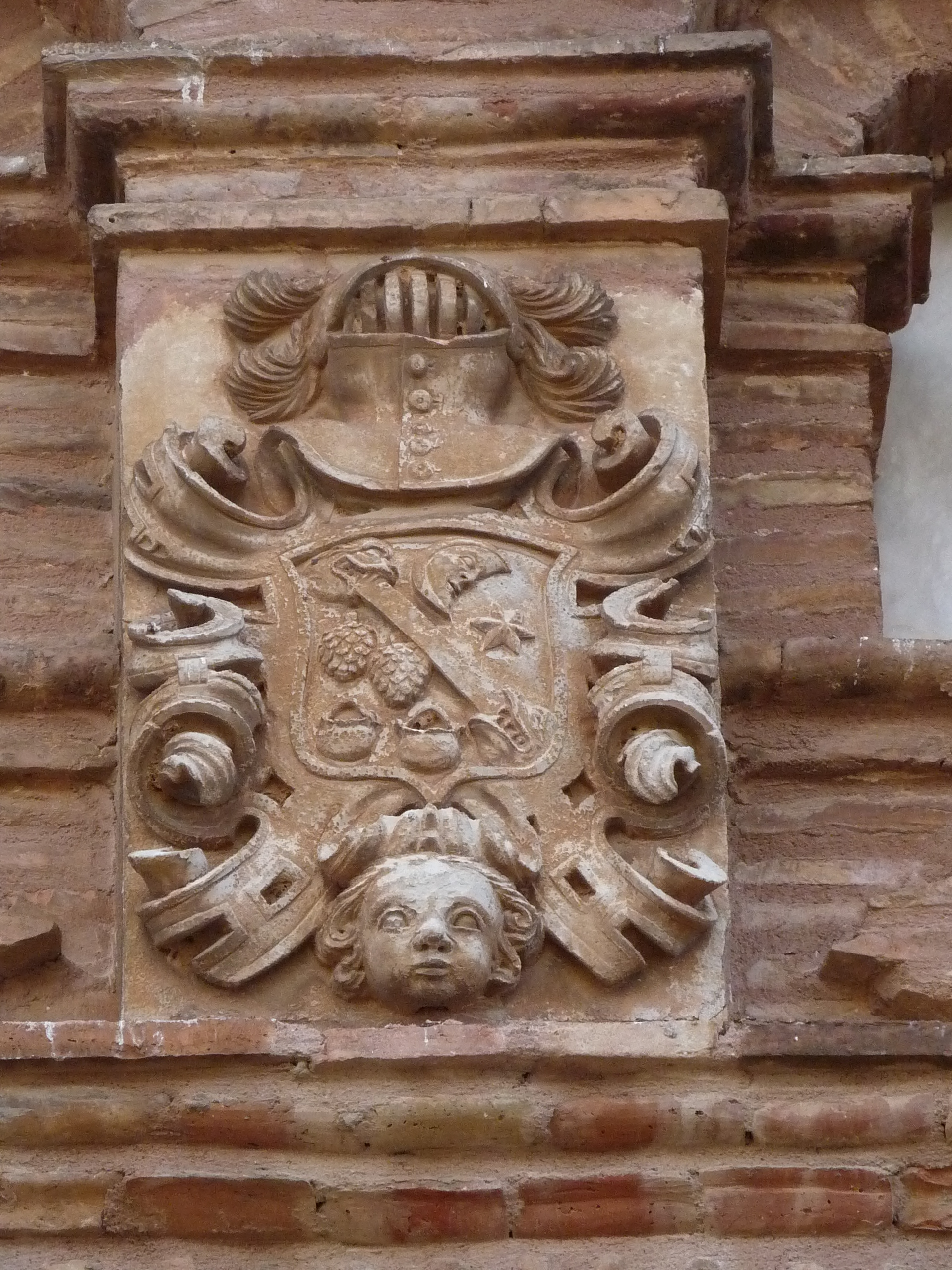
shield on the façade of a house

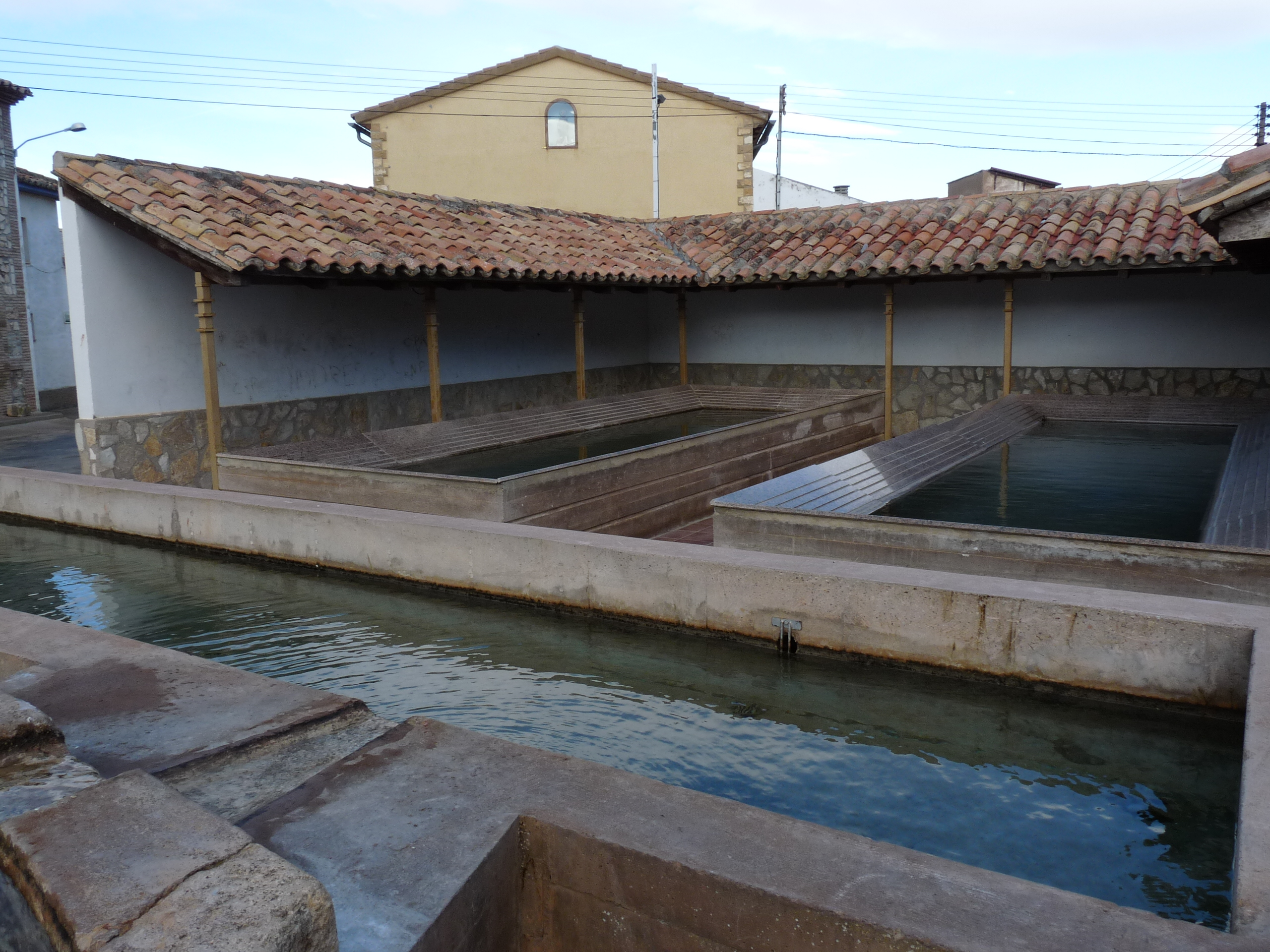
drinking trough and laundry
