= David Castro (footballer) =

Spanish footballer (born 1995)

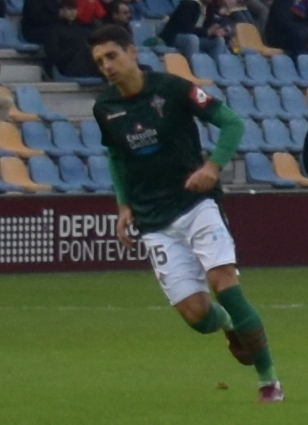
- Castro with Racing Ferrol in 2022

Personal information
- Full name: David Castro Pazos
- Date of birth: 9 October 1995 (age 31)
- Place of birth: Cuntis, Spain
- Height: 1.92 m (6 ft 4 in)
- Position: Centre back

Team information
- Current team: Celje
- Number: 15

Youth career
- Pontevedra

Senior career*
| Years | Team | Apps | (Gls) |
| 2014 | Portonovo | | |
| 2014–2016 | Estradense | 67 | (7) |
| 2016–2017 | Céltiga | 36 | (2) |
| 2017–2019 | Pontevedra | 53 | (2) |
| 2019–2020 | Valencia B | 19 | (0) |
| 2020–2021 | Numancia | 13 | (1) |
| 2021–2025 | Racing Ferrol | 124 | (4) |
| 2025– | Celje | 2 | (0) |
- * Club domestic league appearances and goals as of 17:11, 19 April 2026 (UTC)

David Castro Pazos (born 9 October 1995) is a Spanish footballer who plays for Slovenian club Celje. Mainly a central defender, he can also play as a right back.

== Club career ==
Castro was born in Cuntis, Pontevedra, Galicia, Castro played youth football with local side Pontevedra CF. In January 2014, he joined Portonovo SD in the Preferente Autonómica, and made his senior debut with the side.

On 19 June 2014, Castro signed for fellow fifth division side CD Estradense. On 21 June 2016, after two seasons as a regular starter, he moved to Tercera División club Céltiga FC.

On 13 June 2017, Castro returned to Pontevedra, now as a member of the first team in Segunda División B. On 15 July 2019, he was sold to Valencia CF, being assigned to the reserves in the same division.

On 6 September 2020, Castro terminated his contract with the Che and moved to CD Numancia also in the third tier. The following 18 June, he agreed to a deal with Primera División RFEF side Racing de Ferrol.

A regular starter, Castro contributed with one goal in 35 league appearances during the 2022–23 season, as Racing returned to Segunda División after 15 years. He made his professional debut at the age of 27 on 12 August 2023, starting in a 1–0 away win over Elche CF.

On 25 June 2025, Castro signed a two-year contract with Celje in Slovenia.

== Honours ==
Celje

- Slovenian PrvaLiga: 2025–26
