= Fernando Pumar =

Spanish footballer

Personal information
- Full name: Fernando Pumar Prieto
- Date of birth: 30 September 1989 (age 37)
- Place of birth: Ourense, Spain
- Height: 1.82 m (6 ft 0 in)
- Position: Left-back

Youth career
- Montañeros

Senior career*
Years	Team	Apps	(Gls)
2007–2009	Montañeros	4	(0)
2009–2010	Narón	28	(0)
2010–2014	Racing Ferrol	105	(2)
2014–2017	Murcia	90	(1)
2017–2018	Lleida Esportiu	35	(1)
2018–2019	Salamanca	4	(0)
2019–2020	San Fernando	19	(0)
2020–2024	Racing Ferrol	47	(0)
Total		332	(4)
- * Club domestic league appearances and goals

Fernando Pumar Prieto (born 30 September 1989) is a Spanish retired footballer who played as a left-back.

== Club career ==
Pumar was born in Ourense, Galicia, and represented Montañeros CF as a youth. In 2009, after having already played for their first team in Tercera División, he moved to fellow league team Narón BP.

On 16 June 2010, Pumar signed for Racing de Ferrol also in the fourth division, and helped in their promotion to Segunda División B in 2013. On 16 July 2014, he joined Real Murcia also in the third level, reuniting with former Racing manager José Manuel Aira.

On 17 July 2017, Pumar agreed to a one-year contract with Lleida Esportiu, still in division three. On 12 July 2018, he moved to Salamanca CF UDS in the same category, but suffered a serious knee injury in September which kept him sidelined for the remainder of the season.

On 11 July 2019, Pumar joined fellow third tier side San Fernando CD. On 6 August 2020, after being a regular starter for Sanfer, he returned to Racing.

A first-choice, Pumar renewed his contract with the Departamentais for a further year on 3 July 2022. In November, however, he again suffered a knee injury which sidelined him for the remainder of the campaign, as Racing achieved promotion to Segunda División after 15 years.

In February 2024, Pumar gave away his registration spot to new signing Pinchi, but still trained with the side until the end of the season. He left after his contract expired in June, and subsequently retired.
