= Estadio Municipal de A Malata =

Stadium in Ferrol, Spain

A Malata
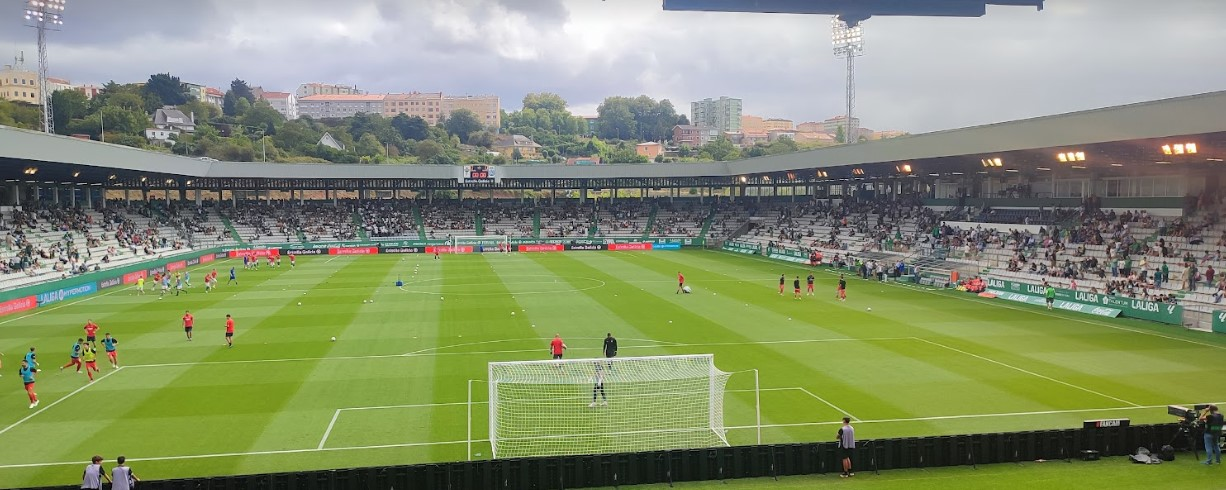
- Interactive map of A Malata
- Full name: Estadio Municipal de A Malata
- Location: Ferrol (La Coruña) (Galicia (Spain)) Galicia
- Coordinates: 43.4912°N 8.2394°W
- Owner: Ferrol City Council
- Capacity: 11 669
- Surface: Grass (English Ray Grass)
- Scoreboard: 2 Video Scoreboards
- Field size: 105 m × 68 m (344 ft × 223 ft)

Construction
- Built: 1992 - February 1993
- Opened: 29 August 1993 (33 years)
- Renovated: 2023-2026
- Cost: Original; 1.7 billion ptas. (€10.2 million); Remodelación €5.9 million
- Architects: Juan Pérez López de Gamarra; Francisco Iglesias Miño; Juan Rey-Cabarcos; Vicente Fernández-Couto; Alfredo Alcalá Navarro
- General contractor: Agromán

Tenants
- Racing de Ferrol; Spain national football team (selected matches)

El Estadio Municipal de A Malata (officially in Galician Estadio Municipal da Malata) is a Spanish football stadium located in the Galician city of Ferrol, in the province of La Coruña. It is located in the sports city of A Malata, next to the promenade in the A Malata cove and the Punta Arnela fairgrounds.

Its owner is the Ferrol City Council and the Racing Club of Ferrol serves as the venue for the football matches that are played there.

In addition to being the home of the Racing Club de Ferrol, the stadium is used by other entities:

- Ferrol Mountaineering Club (climbing wall)
- Kayak Polo Copacabana (Artificial Lake)

During the 2030 World Cup, it will be one of the World Cup sub-venues, and will host 2 teams that will have Malata as their base training center for the world championship.

== History ==
It was built to replace the old Manuel Rivera Stadium, located in the O Inferniño neighborhood, which gave way to a large public square and a shopping center. It was built by the company Agromán and financed with 1,700 million pesetas (€10.2 million) by the Galician government.
It was designed by a team of five architects: Juan Pérez López de Gamarra, Francisco Iglesias Miño, Juan Rey-Cabarcos, Vicente Fernández-Couto and Alfredo Alcalá Navarro.
The first match was played on April 18, 1993 in a league match between Racing and Atlético de Madrid B (3-2). However, it was officially inaugurated on August 29, 1993 with a match between Celta de Vigo and Real Club Deportivo de La Coruña.

Since the premiere of A Malata, Racing de Ferrol has played in the Second Division in the following campaigns:

A Malata in the Second Division
2000/01, 2001/02, 2002/03, 2004/05, 2005/06, 2007/08, 2023/24, 2024/25

The Ferrol stadium is also the scene of the Concepción Arenal trophy matches (born in 1953), highlighting the 1994 editions (with Aston Villa and Atlético de Madrid as contenders, with a British victory ) and 1995 (with Zaragoza and Ajax, with the Dutch team's final victory). In that year, a friendly match was also played between Racing de Ferrol and Borussia Dortmund.

In the 2023-24 season, Racing Club de Ferrol has made A Malata the only undefeated stadium in the First and Second division, accumulating one calendar year, from December 17, 2022 to December 17, 2023, in which It has been called "The A Malata effect". In the major European leagues, only Liverpool can equal Racing's record without losing at home in all of 2023.

== Facilities ==
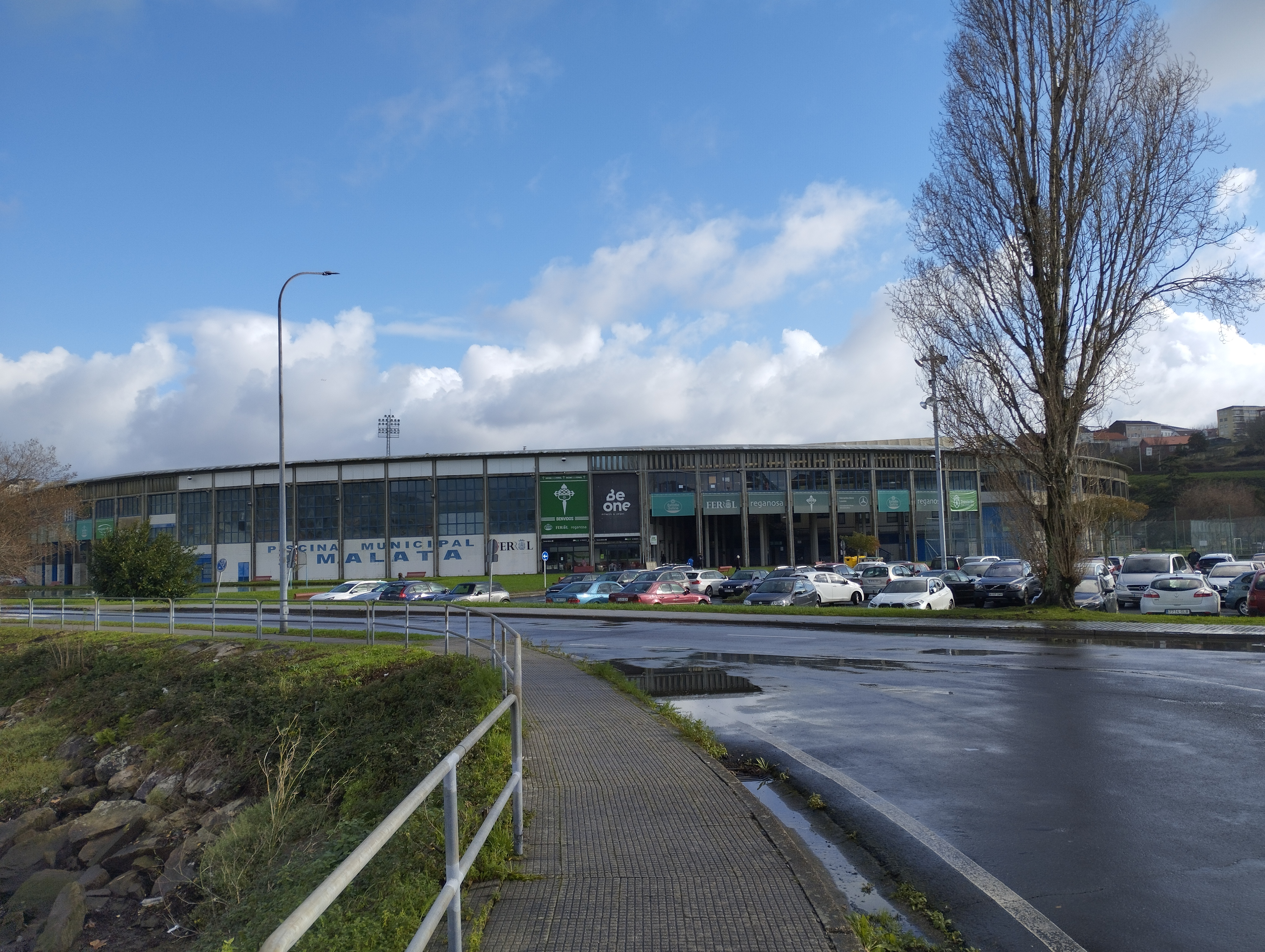
Exterior view

The A Malata Stadium is located on a municipal area of 144,806 square meters next to the Punta Arnela fairgrounds and the A Malata cove.

The stadium is equipped with a pop-up sprinkler irrigation system, two video scoreboards (August 2025), changing rooms, cafeteria, offices, an area for radio, press, and TV, VAR technology, CCTV system, LED lighting, anti-doping room, fire protection system, emergency lighting and PA system, access turnstiles, UCO (Organizational Control Unit)...

It also has a heated indoor pool and other sports facilities (gym, climbing wall, spa, kayak polo, skate park). It also has an attached 93 x 58.5 m natural grass field.

The playing field measures 105 x 68 meters and is made of natural grass, the English Ray Grass type, installed in July 2023. The stadium's original capacity was 12,043 spectators, all of whom were covered.

The stadium's total capacity has been reduced due to various facility upgrades ( VAR technology, new benches, new press and TV area, etc.), bringing it down to less than 12,000 seats. Specifically, according to the latest data provided by the sports management (July 2024) it is 11 669 spectators.

=== Management of the facilities ===
The legal figure that will govern the use of the facilities of the Municipal Stadium of A Malata by Racing will be the demanial concession, and it will be free of charge. Among the administrative clauses contemplated in the document, it is stated that the club will be able to use the central playing field, the seats, the ticket offices, the annex field and other facilities for holding matches and training sessions. The duration of the new agreement is 3 years, extendable to a maximum of 15 years.

The rest of the facilities of the complex are excluded, such as the climbing wall, the municipal swimming pool and the ground floor next to the kayak lagoon. Meanwhile, the City Council will be able to organize sporting and cultural events in the stadium as long as they do not interfere with the official competition or activities programmed by the club. The City Council will organise the Concepción Arenal trophy with the collaboration and organisational support of racing.

As regards maintenance and works, the club will be responsible for all costs of conservation, repair, improvements, reforms, cleaning and security necessary for the proper use of the facilities. The larger works, such as those affecting the structure of the stadium, its stability or the roofs, will be the responsibility of the City Council.

The necessary technical adjustments required by the regulatory bodies of the official competitions for the participation of the team will be carried out by Racing, as well as the adoption of security and emergency measures.

=== LED Lighting ===
The A Malata Stadium lighting system, installed in 1993 and based on metal halide lamp technology, was showing clear signs of obsolescence and deterioration after 32 years of service. With a total of 202 floodlights distributed between the towers and the eaves of the stands, the system not only failed to meet the lighting standards required for LaLiga television broadcasts, but also presented critical safety issues due to corrosion and lack of proper maintenance.

During an inspection conducted in November 2023, serious deficiencies were revealed, such as exposed wiring and water-filled spotlights, compromising the integrity of the system. Furthermore, the difficulty in finding spare parts for this type of obsolete technology portended a problematic future, highlighting the urgent need for an upgrade to the most modern and efficient LED technology. The lighting renovation project includes the implementation of LED technology for the pitch lighting system, ensuring it meets the lighting levels required by LALIGA EA SPORTS in HD, according to the standards of the Television Broadcasting Regulations.

The total cost of the installation is €18,000,000, with €750,000 covered by the Ferrol City Council, €750,000 by the A Coruña Provincial Council, and €300,000 by Racing Club Ferrol.

These new spotlights can be attached to the new stadium roof (included in the budget for the A Malata sports city). Twenty-seven floodlights will be installed per tower, with another 120 distributed along the eaves of the complex's roof: 50 in the Grandstand, 50 in the Preferencia stand, 10 in the South End, and another ten in the North End.

There will be two types of luminaires and seven types of optics, and a centralized control system will be incorporated for regulation and monitoring, as well as for the implementation of light shows.

Finally, the installation will include a generator to "provide backup power for the television broadcasting systems and stadium lighting in the event of a power failure," in addition to replacing its lightning rod network with "remote verification technology and a protection system." The generator is located in one of the rooms in the north end. The stadium's new LED lighting will be completed in August 2025.

The lighting in the common areas of the stands was replaced with LEDs in 2023.

=== Video Scoreboards ===
A Malata's old electronic scoreboards, which only provided information on the match score and time, were already very deteriorated, and even the one at Fondo Sur broke down at the start of the 2024/2025 league season and was inoperative until the end of the campaign, causing problems for the Fondo Norte fans. Video scoreboards were a long-standing aspiration of the club's owners, Grupo Élite, who always expressed their desire to equip the stadium with these high-resolution LED screens, which would provide fans with information, product offers, notifications, and advertising for the club's sponsors. The LED screens were installed by Trison, a Galician company specializing in the digitalization of physical spaces and sensory marketing, and were completed in August 2025. They were installed at both ends of the stadium, at the top of the stands.

=== Roof ===
The new roof structure is the largest renovation of the new and modern A Malata stadium. It will replace the current 32-year-old roof, which has deteriorated significantly due to exposure to inclement weather and its proximity to the estuary.

On September 8, 2025, the first phase of the renovation was approved, covering 85% of the total roof. A second phase, covering the remaining 15% (corresponding to the southeast corner of the stadium), requires state permits as it is within the construction line of the FE-15 highway, owned by the Ministry of Transport.

The total cost of the roof renovation, which is funded by the regional government, amounts to €2,957,566.60.

The new roof will measure 181.75 x 121 meters, leaving an interior space of 134 x 73.6 meters. According to the team, the finish will be green pre-lacquered steel sheet, and the club's official name will be lettered 8 meters high in white vinyl. The work includes the installation of four skylights to facilitate access to the roof, with the aim of promoting its future maintenance. Work will also be done on the flat roof of the right-of-way access, and the roof's overhang towards the interior of the field will be increased by 2.5 meters, thus recovering the first rows not currently covered by the old roof.

The translucent roof of the access corridor will be replaced, modifying its structure to integrate it into the same plane as the rest of the roof. Windows will also be installed in the South End corridor to prevent water from entering the area. Downpipes, gutters, and railings will also be colored Racing Green to unify the stadium's image. This action, included within the macro-project of the City of Sports, also contemplates the humanization of the stadium environment and its interconnection with other points of interest such as Fimo or the A Malata sports hall.

All these renovations will be carried out with funding from the Provincial Council of La Coruña, the Ferrol City Council, and the Xunta de Galicia, which will allow the A Malata Stadium to become one of the most modern stadiums in Galicia.

== ESSMA Stadium Industry Awards ==
The ESSMA awards recognize excellent, innovative and creative initiatives within the management of sports stadiums. Among the various categories covered by the awards, the Racing Club of Ferrol nominates the works carried out in A Malata during the summer of 2023 for the “Security and Protection” category.

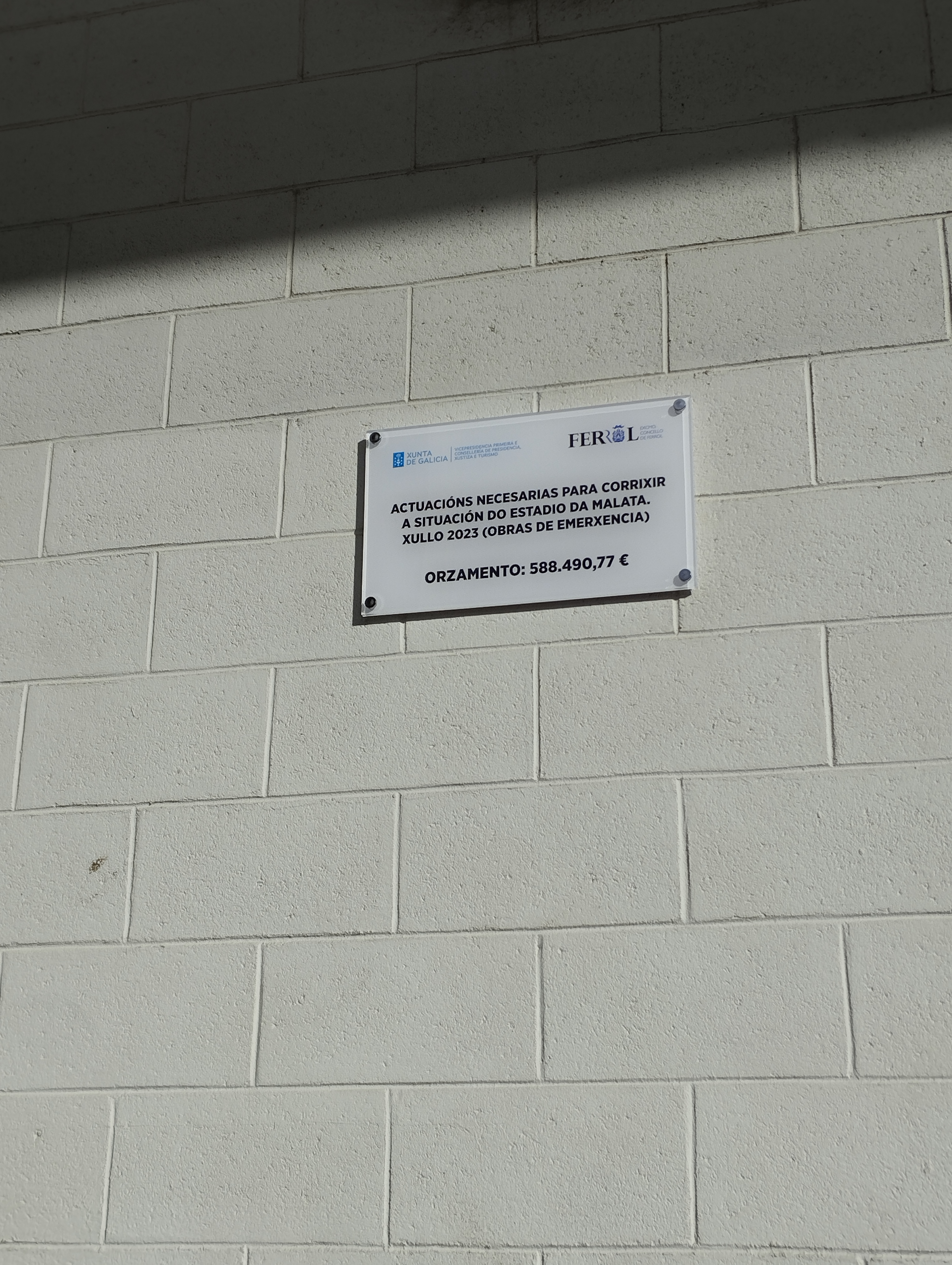

During the months of July and August 2023, the Racing Club de Ferrol, in coordination with the Junta de Galicia and the Ferrol City Council, and under the umbrella of LALIGA, carried out notable actions focused on solving the anomalies detected in the audits carried out by the national football entity in order to certify the suitability of the A Malata facilities for playing LALIGA Hypermotion

After years without receiving adequate maintenance, the stadium had suffered significant deterioration that forced major works to be undertaken to comply with current regulations regarding security, violence prevention and protection of attendees.

The speed, efficiency and management by the different administrations involved when carrying out the works made the president of LA LIGA himself, Javier Tebas, congratulate the Racing Club de Ferrol personally.

Carlos Mouriz, Racing sports director, read verbatim the words he addressed to him on August 24, 2023:

Dear Carlos, I wanted to congratulate you and the members of the club for the diligence to enable your A Malata stadium in record time, adapting it to the regulatory requirements to play La Liga matches with a guarantee of safety for the participants and assistants. I ask you to forward this congratulations to the Ferrol City Council if you deem it appropriate for their involvement in the project that generates value not only to Racing de Ferrol but also to La Liga, a cordial greeting: Javier Tebas.

—

The objective was none other than to provide a positive experience for the users of the field beyond the merely sporting spectacle, emphasizing aspects such as accessibility, safety and permanence in the venue for people with reduced mobility.

Racing Club Ferrol, endorsed by LALIGA, presented the candidacy for awards for which on November 8, 2023, the nominees in each category were made public, among which is the A Malata Stadium.

A voting period was then opened among the members of the ESSMA and once this was concluded, on January 23, 2024, the name of the winners will be revealed within the framework of a grand gala to be held at the Johan Cruyff Arena. from Amsterdam.

At the gala, A Malata finally obtained the award as winner, for which she nominated in the Security and Protection category.

== World Subheadquarters 2030 ==
The FIFA has confirmed Ferrol as one of the cities where the national teams will gather during the 2030 World Cup. The city will host two teams that will have Malata as their base training center for the championship. The choice of Ferrol as the concentration venue occurred after a technical evaluation carried out in February 2024 by representatives of the Royal Spanish Football Federation, who visited the A Malata stadium to analyze its suitability. This designation consolidates Ferrol as a key player in one of the most important sporting events in the world. With this opportunity, the naval city is preparing to receive not only international teams, but also thousands of fans who will turn the 2030 World Cup into a historic event for Ferrol and Galicia.

== A malata twin ==
The A Malata Stadium was taken as a model (along with the San Lázaro Multipurpose Stadium but without athletics tracks) when building the Reino de León Municipal Stadium. Both the dimensions of the playing rectangle (105 x 68) and the stands of A Malata are identical to those of the Kingdom of León. The Ferrol venue has 11,922 seats, all of them covered (compared to the 13,451 in the Leon stadium)
