= Racing de Ferrol =

- Full name: Racing Club de Ferrol, S.A.D.
- Nicknames: Os Departamentais; Os Diaños Verdes (Green Devils)
- Founded: 5 October 1919; 107 years ago
- Stadium: Estadio Municipal de A Malata
- Capacity: 11,922
- Owner: Grupo Elite
- President: Manolo Ansede
- Head coach: Javi Vázquez
- League: Primera Federación – Group 1
- 2025–26: Primera Federación – Group 1, 12th of 20
- Website: racingclubferrol.net
Home colours	Away colours

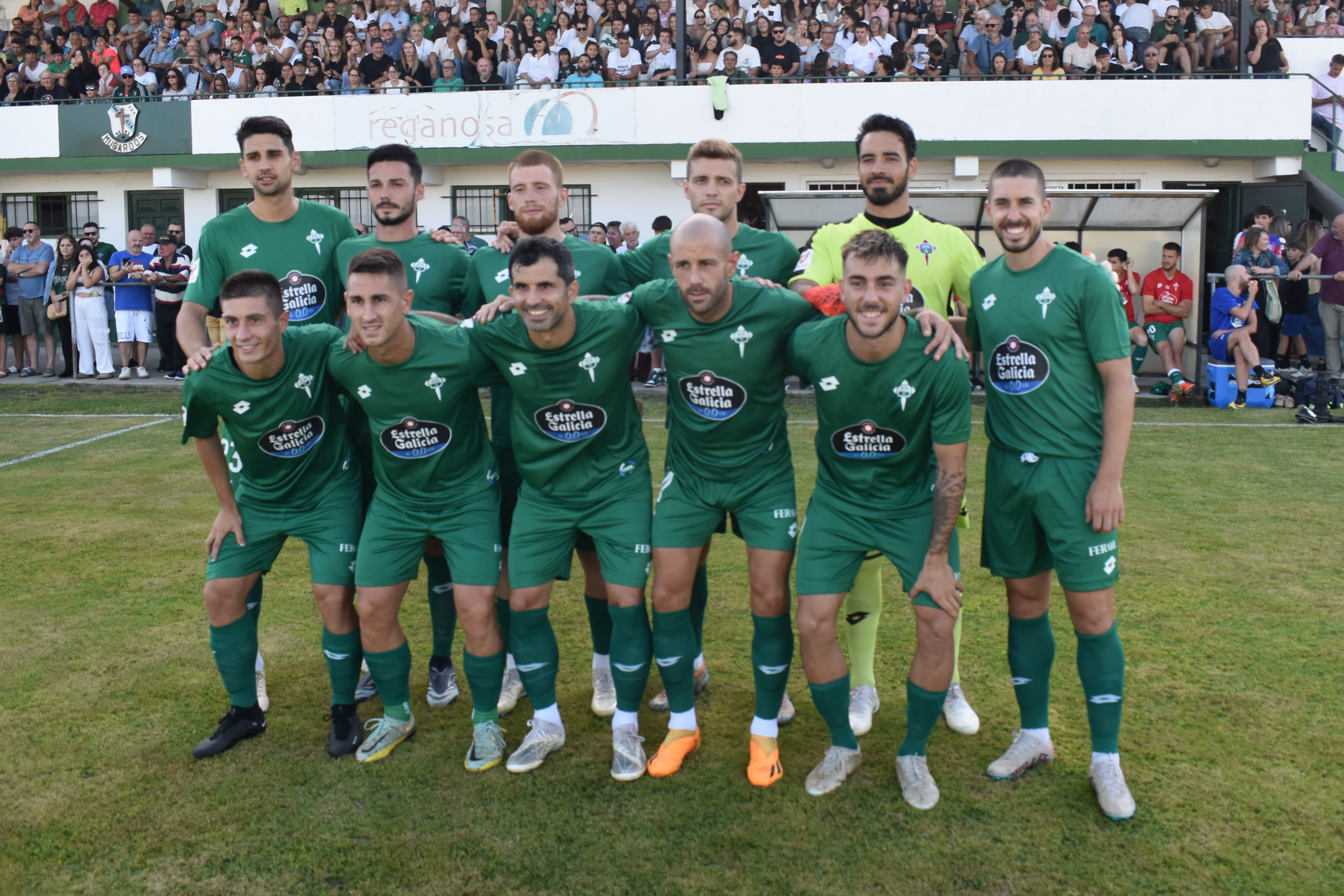
Racing Club de Ferrol 2023–24.

Racing Club de Ferrol, commonly known as Racing de Ferrol or Racing Ferrol, is a Spanish football team based in Ferrol, Province of A Coruña, in the autonomous community of Galicia.

Founded in 1919, the club currently plays in Primera Federación – Group 1, holding home games at Estadio da Malata. Club colours are green shirts with white shorts, though during the early years of its existence green and white shirts with vertical stripes were used.

Although Racing has never played in Spain's top division of La Liga, the club has spent many years in the second tier before being in the third tier more recently. Racing holds the record for most seasons in the second tier without making La Liga (35).

== History ==
The history of football in Ferrol is associated with the shipbuilding yards, workshops, foundries and drydocks and the British technical advisors, hired to work locally who used to play against each-other at first, but later on, local workers and military personnel stationed in Ferrol. The renewal of the shipyards and the creation, in town of the "school of Naval Engineers" meant that from the mid-nineteenth century, a mostly French at first but, latter on mostly British, Engineers and Technicians, a constant influx was developed; bringing to Ferrol not new technologies. From those early years to these days many football clubs came and go over the decades but only one of them actually survived for a considerable time and for that, only as an amalgamation of some other previous teams and this is el Racing de Ferrol.

Racing Ferrol Football Club, can trace back its origins back to July 1919, but starting very strongly from the beginning on a massive winning all matches spree that allow the team to play against the best national squads in the country so only ten years after its creation Racing Ferrol Football Club was taking part on its first national championships competition and fluctuating later over the decades between first and second divisions as follows: the second – first presence in 1939–40 – and third divisions. In 1977–78 the Galicians won the inaugural edition of Segunda División B and promoted again, only to be immediately relegated back.

Chart of Racing Club de Ferrol league performance 1929–present.

It would not until the year 2000 that Racing would again reach the second level, going on to spend there five of the following six years. In the 2006–07 campaign the club gained promotion to the category in the playoffs, with a 2–1 aggregate win against Alicante CF. In the following season the team finished fourth from the bottom and dropped back to the third division, and to the fourth only two years later. In the 2012–13 campaign, the club achieved promoted to third division. Five years later, the club was relegated to fourth division. But one year later, the club achieved promotion back to third division.

In the 2022-23 campaign, Ferrol promoted back to second division after spending 15 years in third and fourth division. But two years later, Ferrol was relegated back to third division.

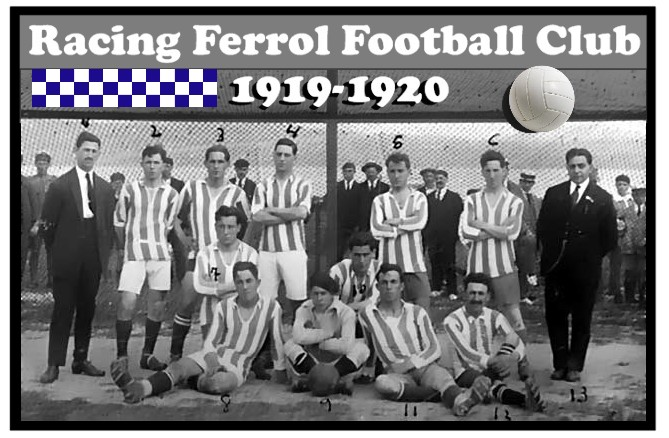
Racing Club de Ferrol 1919–1920.

== Season to season ==
Season	Tier	Division	Place	Copa del Rey
1929–30	3	3ª	1st	
1930–31	3	3ª	3rd	
1931–32	3	3ª	1st	
1932–33	3	3ª	4th	Round of 32
1933–34	3	3ª	5th	Round of 32
1934–35	2	2ª	8th	Third round
1939–40	2	2ª	2nd	Runners-up
1940–41	2	2ª	4th	
1941–42	2	2ª	3rd	
1942–43	2	2ª	6th	
1943–44	3	3ª	1st	
1944–45	2	2ª	10th	Round of 16
1945–46	2	2ª	7th	First round
1946–47	2	2ª	10th	First round
1947–48	2	2ª	3rd	Round of 16
1948–49	2	2ª	14th	Fourth round
1949–50	2	2ª	12th	
1950–51	2	2ª	8th	
1951–52	2	2ª	3rd	
1952–53	2	2ª	9th	Second round

Season	Tier	Division	Place	Copa del Rey
1953–54	2	2ª	8th	
1954–55	2	2ª	12th	
1955–56	2	2ª	6th	
1956–57	2	2ª	16th	
1957–58	2	2ª	12th	
1958–59	2	2ª	10th	First round
1959–60	2	2ª	16th	Round of 32
1960–61	3	3ª	1st	
1961–62	3	3ª	2nd	
1962–63	3	3ª	1st	
1963–64	3	3ª	3rd	
1964–65	3	3ª	1st	
1965–66	3	3ª	1st	
1966–67	2	2ª	7th	First round
1967–68	2	2ª	7th	First round
1968–69	2	2ª	4th	
1969–70	2	2ª	10th	Quarter-finals
1970–71	2	2ª	8th	Round of 32
1971–72	2	2ª	18th	Third round
1972–73	3	3ª	9th	

Season	Tier	Division	Place	Copa del Rey
1973–74	3	3ª	4th	Third round
1974–75	3	3ª	3rd	
1975–76	3	3ª	9th	Fourth round
1976–77	3	3ª	6th	First round
1977–78	3	2ª B	1st	Second round
1978–79	2	2ª	20th	Third round
1979–80	3	2ª B	16th	
1980–81	3	2ª B	11th	
1981–82	3	2ª B	17th	
1982–83	3	2ª B	9th	
1983–84	3	2ª B	20th	
1984–85	4	3ª	3rd	
1985–86	4	3ª	8th	
1986–87	4	3ª	17th	
1987–88	4	3ª	1st	
1988–89	3	2ª B	13th	
1989–90	3	2ª B	17th	
1990–91	4	3ª	5th	
1991–92	4	3ª	1st	
1992–93	3	2ª B	12th	Third round

Season	Tier	Division	Place	Copa del Rey
1993–94	3	2ª B	13th	
1994–95	3	2ª B	1st	
1995–96	3	2ª B	2nd	
1996–97	3	2ª B	7th	
1997–98	3	2ª B	5th	
1998–99	3	2ª B	4th	
1999–2000	3	2ª B	3rd	Preliminary
2000–01	2	2ª	16th	Round of 64
2001–02	2	2ª	9th	Round of 32
2002–03	2	2ª	20th	Round of 32
2003–04	3	2ª B	2nd	Round of 64
2004–05	2	2ª	16th	Round of 64
2005–06	2	2ª	20th	Second round
2006–07	3	2ª B	3rd	Second round
2007–08	2	2ª	19th	Second round
2008–09	3	2ª B	7th	First round
2009–10	3	2ª B	19th	
2010–11	4	3ª	2nd	
2011–12	4	3ª	8th	
2012–13	4	3ª	1st	

Season	Tier	Division	Place	Copa del Rey
2013–14	3	2ª B	2nd	First round
2014–15	3	2ª B	3rd	Second round
2015–16	3	2ª B	2nd	Third round
2016–17	3	2ª B	7th	Second round
2017–18	3	2ª B	18th	Second round
2018–19	4	3ª	1st	
2019–20	3	2ª B	11th	First round
2020–21	3	2ª B	5th / 1st	
2021–22	3	1ª RFEF	3rd	First round
2022–23	3	1ª Fed.	1st	First round
2023–24	2	2ª	10th	Round of 32
2024–25	2	2ª	21st	Round of 32
2025–26	3	1ª Fed.	12th	Second round
2026–27	3	1ª Fed.		

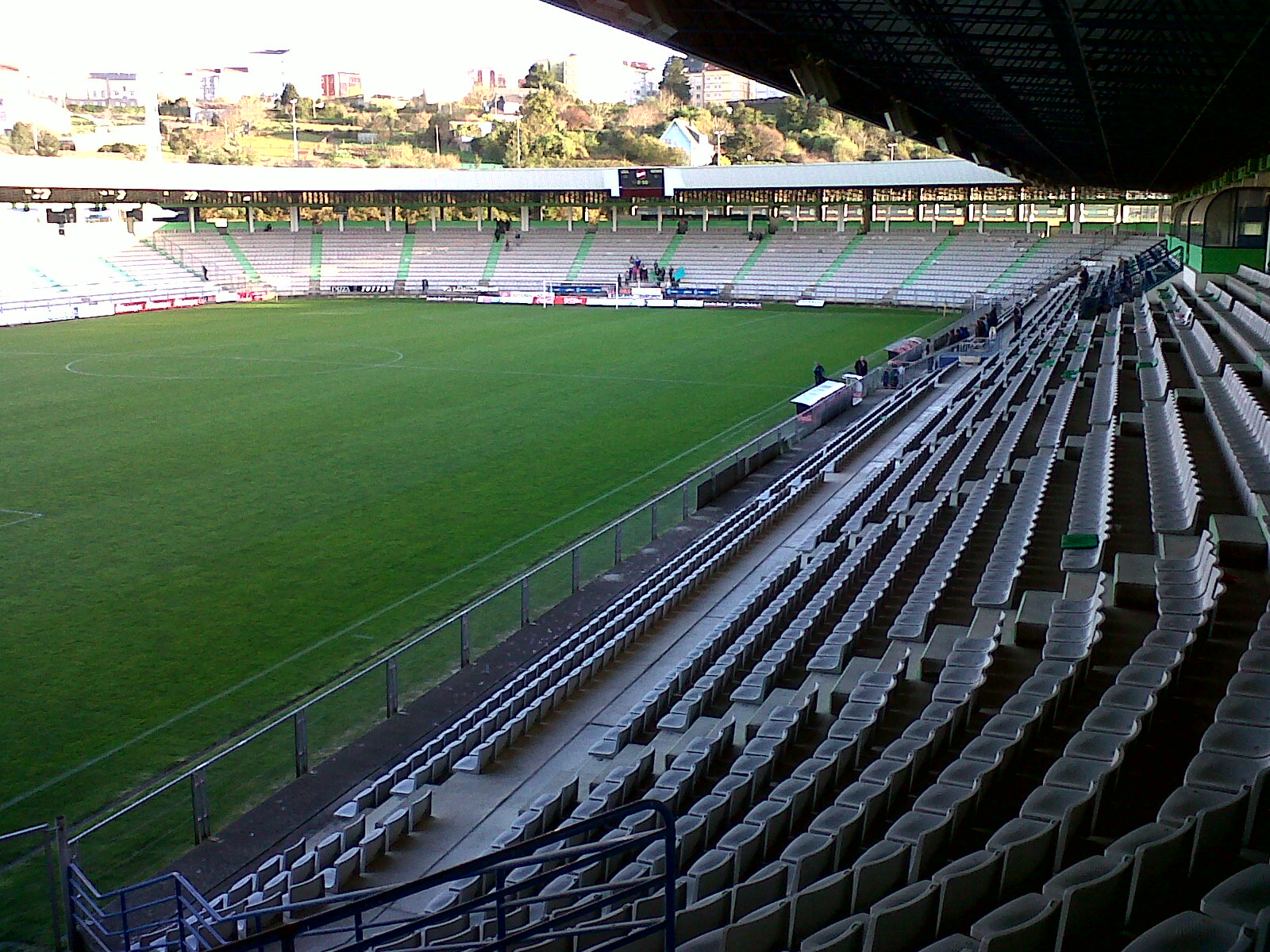
Estadio Municipal da Malata.

- 36 seasons in Segunda División
- 4 seasons in Primera Federación/Primera División RFEF
- 27 seasons in Segunda División B
- 27 seasons in Tercera División

== Current squad ==
As of 4 November 2026

Note: Flags indicate national team as defined under FIFA eligibility rules; some limited exceptions apply. Players may hold more than one non-FIFA nationality.

No.	Pos.	Nation	Player
1	GK	ESP	Lucas Díaz
2	DF	ESP	Migue Leal
3	DF	DOM	Edgar Climent
4	DF	ESP	Germán Nóvoa
5	DF	ESP	Eric Monjonell
6	MF	ESP	Fabio González
7	FW	ESP	Álvaro Juan
8	MF	ESP	Vicente Esquerdo
9	FW	ESP	Unai Ropero (on loan from Alavés)
10	FW	ESP	Dani Ojeda
11	FW	ESP	Endika Buján

No.	Pos.	Nation	Player
13	GK	ESP	César Fernández
14	MF	ESP	Jesús Bernal
15	DF	ESP	David Castro
16	FW	ESP	Raúl Blanco
17	DF	ESP	Álvaro Ramón
18	FW	CMR	Etienne Eto'o (on loan from Rayo Vallecano)
19	FW	ESP	Roberto Arroyo
20	FW	ESP	Raúl Alcaina
21	MF	ESP	Azael García
22	DF	ESP	Saúl García
23	MF	MLI	Sekou Djanbou

=== Reserve team ===
Note: Flags indicate national team as defined under FIFA eligibility rules; some limited exceptions apply. Players may hold more than one non-FIFA nationality.

No.	Pos.	Nation	Player
27	MF	ESP	Joel Tenreiro
28	FW	ESP	Rubo

No.	Pos.	Nation	Player
34	DF	ESP	Álex González

== Technical staff ==
Position	Staff
Head coach	(Spain) Javi Vázquez
Assistant coach	(Spain) Carlos Salvachúa
Goalkeeping coach	(Spain) César Caamaño
Fitness coach	(Spain) Luis Rodríguez
Rehab fitness coach	(Spain) Óscar Ares
Delegate	(Spain) Manuel Ángel Mesa
Kit man	(Spain) Uxío Romero (Spain) José M. Alcudia
Doctor	(Spain) Carlos Lariño (Spain) Carlos Brage Rodríguez
Physiotherapist	(Spain) Jorge Méndez Rodríguez (Spain) Iván Losada

Last updated: 22 January 2025
Source: Racing Club Ferrol (in Spanish)

== Honours / Achievements ==
=== Regional ===
- Galician Championships: 1928–29, 1937–38, 1938–39

=== Domestic ===
- Campeonato de España / Copa del Generalísimo: Runners-up 1939
- Segunda División B: Promotion 1999–2000, 2006–07

== Notable former players ==
Note: this list includes players that have played at least 100 league games and/or have reached international status.

- (Canada) Samuel Piette
- (Chile) Raúl Palacios
- (Croatia) Dubravko Pavličić
- (Guatemala) Dwight Pezzarossi
- (Guinea) Kaba Diawara
- (Morocco) Nabil Baha
- (Morocco) Samir Boughanem
- (Nigeria) Ikechukwu Uche
- (Serbia) Nenad Grozdić
- (Spain) José Manuel Aira
- (Spain) Gabriel Alonso
- (Spain) José Bello Amigo
- (Spain) Ángel Cuéllar
- (Spain) Guillermo Gorostiza
- (Spain) Joselu
- (Spain) Manel
- (Spain) Jonathan Martín
- (Spain) Nacho Novo
- (Spain) Fernando Pumar
- (Spain) Carlos Rodríguez
- (Spain) Pablo Rodríguez
- (Spain) Luis César Sampedro
- (Venezuela) Jonay Hernández
- (United States) Ante Razov

== Stadium ==
Estadio da Malata holds 12,043 spectators, and was built in 1993. The pitch dimensions are 105 x 68 metres.

Racing used three main stadiums over the years, starting with Campo de Futbol O Inferniño, which was utilized until a move to Estadio Manuel Rivera in 1954 took place. This was an oval-shaped enclosure with a single cantilever stand. In the 1970s, a cover was erected over the popular terrace.

In 1993, the metropolitan area of Ferrol built Estadio da Malata to the west of the town, near the valley of Serantes. The total cost of the development was 1700 million pesetas. The first match on the new grounds was played on 18 April 1993, in a 3–2 friendly win over Atlético Madrid B. The official inauguration took place on 29 August, in a triangular tournament featuring the home side and neighbours Celta de Vigo and Deportivo de La Coruña.

== See also ==
- SECN
- Vickers-Armstrong
- SDC Galicia Mugardos, reserve team
