= 2026–27 Johor Darul Ta'zim F.C. season =

Johor Darul Ta'zim
2026–27 season
- Chairman: Tunku Tun Aminah Sultan Ibrahim
- Manager: Xisco Munoz
- Stadium: Sultan Ibrahim Stadium
Home colours	Away colours	Third colours

The 2026–27 season is Johor Darul Ta'zim Football Club's 53rd season in club history and 12th season in the Malaysia Super League after rebranding their name from Johor FC. The club will also participate in the inaugural 2025–26 AFC Champions League Elite.

== Squad ==
=== Johor Darul Ta'zim ===
As of 15 January 2026

Squad No.	Name	Nationality	Date of birth (age)	Previous club	Contract since	Contract end
Goalkeepers
1	Christian Abad Amat	(Malaysia) (Spain)	5 August 2006 (age 20)	(Spain) Elche (S2)	2024	2026
16	Syihan Hazmi	(Malaysia)	26 February 1996 (age 30)	(Malaysia) Negeri Sembilan	2023	2026
43	Zulhilmi Sharani	(Malaysia)	4 May 2004 (age 22)	(Malaysia) Johor Darul Ta'zim II	2019	2026
58	Andoni Zubiaurre (Note: Andoni Zubiaurre registered for ACL Elite only)	(Spain)	4 December 1996 (age 29)	(Spain) Eldense (S2)	2024	2026
Defenders
2	Matthew Davies	(Malaysia) (Australia)	7 February 1995 (age 31)	(Malaysia) Pahang	2020	2026
3	Shahrul Saad	(Malaysia)	8 July 1993 (age 33)	(Malaysia) Perak	2021	2026
5	Antonio Glauder	(Spain) (Philippines)	18 October 1995 (age 31)	(Spain) Cádiz (S2)	2025	2026
14	Shane Lowry	(Malaysia) (Australia) (Republic of Ireland)	12 June 1989 (age 37)	(Qatar) Al Ahli (Q1)	2021	2026
15	Feroz Baharudin	(Malaysia)	2 April 2000 (age 26)	(Malaysia) Johor Darul Ta'zim II	2021	2026
17	Jon Irazabal (Note: João Figueiredo, Jon Irazabal, and Hector Hevel were suspended by FIFA from all football activities on 26 September over alleged falsified documents regarding their eligibility for Malaysian sporting nationality. This was temporarily lifted on 27 Jan till the CAS judgement. See: Malaysian football naturalisation scandal)	(Malaysia) (Spain)	28 November 1996 (age 29)	(Azerbaijan) Sabah (A1)	2025	2026
20	Dani Bolt	(Brazil)	18 June 1999 (age 27)	(Azerbaijan) Qarabağ FK (A1)	2026	2027
22	La'Vere Corbin-Ong	(Malaysia) (Canada)	21 April 1991 (age 35)	(Netherlands) Go Ahead Eagles (N1)	2018	2026
23	Eddy Israfilov	(Azerbaijan) (Spain)	2 August 1992 (age 34)	(Azerbaijan) Neftçi PFK (A1)	2024	2026
26	Brad Tapp	(Malaysia) (Australia)	16 January 2001 (age 25)	(Australia) Central Coast Mariners (A1)	2026	
27	Gabriel Palmero	(Malaysia) (Spain)	15 January 2002 (age 24)	(Malaysia) Kuching City	2026	2027
29	Carlos Akapo	(Equatorial Guinea) (Spain)	12 March 1993 (age 33)	(Brazil) Amazonas	2026	2027
33	Jonathan Silva	(Argentina) (Italy)	29 June 1994 (age 32)	(Cyprus) Pafos (C1)	2025	2027
44	Miquel Cuesta	(Spain)	26 February 2006 (age 20)	(Spain) RCD Mallorca U19 (S5)	2025	2026
50	Arayyan Hakeem	(Malaysia)	13 September 2009 (age 17)	(Malaysia) Johor Darul Ta'zim III	2022	2026
81	Kevin Medina	(Colombia)	9 March 1993 (age 33)	(Azerbaijan) Qarabağ FK (A1)	2026	2027
91	Syahmi Safari	(Malaysia)	5 February 1998 (age 28)	(Malaysia) Selangor	2022	2027
	Junior Eldstål	(Malaysia) (Sweden)	16 September 1991 (age 35)	(Indonesia) Dewa United (I1)	2022	2027
Midfielders
4	Afiq Fazail	(Malaysia)	29 September 1994 (age 32)	(Malaysia) Harimau Muda B	2015	2028
6	Hong Wan	(Malaysia) (England)	17 August 2000 (age 26)	(England) Wolverhampton Wanderers U23	2021	2026
8	Hector Hevel	(Malaysia) (Netherlands)	15 May 1996 (age 30)	(Portugal) Portimonense (P2)	2025	2026
12	Stuart Wilkin	(Malaysia) (England)	12 March 1998 (age 28)	(Malaysia) Sabah	2026	2026
18	Nené (Note: Nené registered for ACL Elite only)	(Portugal)	10 June 1995 (age 31)	(China) Yunnan Yukun (C1)	2026	
19	Stoichkov	(Spain)	5 November 1993 (age 33)	(Spain) Granada CF	2026	
21	Dejan Petrovič	(Slovenia)	12 January 1998 (age 28)	(Croatia) Rijeka (C1)	2026	2030
28	Nacho Méndez	(Malaysia) (Spain)	30 March 1998 (age 28)	(Spain) Sporting Gijón (S2)	2025	
30	Natxo Insa	(Malaysia) (Spain)	9 June 1986 (age 40)	(Spain) Levante (S1)	2017	2026
40	Daniesh Amirruddin	(Malaysia)	3 August 2006 (age 20)	(Malaysia) Johor Darul Ta'zim III	2024	
41	Syamer Kutty Abba	(Malaysia)	1 October 1997 (age 29)	(Malaysia) Kuala Lumpur City	2018	2026
47	Ager Aketxe (Note: Ager Aketxe registered for ACL Elite only)	(Spain)	30 December 1993 (age 32)	(Spain) Zaragoza (S2)	2025	2026
	Daryl Sham	(Malaysia) (Philippines)	30 November 2002 (age 23)	(Malaysia) Johor Darul Ta'zim II	2021	
	Enzo Lombardo	(France) (Philippines)	16 April 1997 (age 29)	(Spain) Huesca (S2)	2024	2026
	Mohamadou Sumareh	(Malaysia) (The Gambia)	20 September 1994 (age 32)	(Thailand) Police Tero (T1)	2021	2026
Strikers						
7	Shahab Zahedi	(Iran)	18 August 1995 (age 31)	(Japan) Avispa Fukuoka (J1)	2026	
9	Bergson	(Malaysia) (Brazil)	9 February 1991 (age 35)	(Brazil) Fortaleza (B1)	2021	2026
10	Arif Aiman	(Malaysia)	4 May 2002 (age 24)	(Malaysia) Johor Darul Ta'zim III	2020	2026
11	Jairo	(Brazil)	6 May 1992 (age 34)	(Cyprus) Pafos (C1)	2025	2026
13	Jon Yeabsera Landa	(Spain)	2 February 2005 (age 21)	(Spain) Touring KE	2026	2027
24	Óscar Arribas	(Philippines) (Spain)	20 October 1998 (age 28)	(Spain) Cartagena (S2)	2023	2026
25	João Figueiredo	(Malaysia) (Brazil)	27 May 1996 (age 30)	(Turkey) İstanbul Başakşehir (T1)	2025	2026
77	Matías Nahuel	(Spain) (Argentina)	22 November 1996 (age 29)	(Poland) Jagiellonia Białystok	2026	2027
88	Manuel Hidalgo	(Malaysia) (Argentina)	3 May 1999 (age 27)	(Malaysia) Kuala Lumpur City	2024	2026
95	Marcos Guilherme	(Brazil)	5 August 1995 (age 31)	(Japan) FC Tokyo (J1)	2026	
97	Yago (Note: Yago registered for ACL Elite only)	(Brazil)	26 May 1997 (age 29)	(South Korea) Anyang (K1)	2026	
99	Celso Bermejo (Note: Celso Bermejo registered for ACL Elite only)	(Malaysia) (Spain)	9 January 2005 (age 21)	(Spain) Villarreal C (S5)	2025	2026
	Mario Losada	(Spain)	13 May 1997 (age 29)	(Spain) Zamora (S3)	2026	
On Loan
	Declan Lambert (D)	(Malaysia) (England)	21 September 1998 (age 28)	(Malaysia) Kuala Lumpur City	2024	
	Safawi Rasid	(Malaysia)	5 March 1997 (age 29)	(Malaysia) Kuala Lumpur City	2017	
	Ryan Lambert (M)	(Malaysia) (England)	21 September 1998 (age 28)	(Malaysia) Kuala Lumpur City	2024	
	Haqimi Azim	(Malaysia)	6 January 2003 (age 23)	(Malaysia) Kuala Lumpur City	2025	
	Gabriel Nistelrooy	(Malaysia)	25 April 2000 (age 26)	(Malaysia) Kuala Lumpur City	2020	2025
	Nicolao Dumitru	(Italy)	12 October 1991 (age 35)	(Malaysia) Kuala Lumpur City	2024	
	Danial Amier	(Malaysia)	27 March 1997 (age 29)	(Malaysia) Kuching City	2021	
	Nazmi Faiz	(Malaysia)	16 August 1994 (age 32)	(Malaysia) Johor Darul Ta'zim II	2017	
	Ibrahim Manusi	(Malaysia)	30 September 2001 (age 25)	(Malaysia) Pahang	2025	
19	Romel Morales	(Malaysia) (Colombia)	23 August 1997 (age 29)	(Malaysia) Kuala Lumpur City	2024	
29	Ajdin Mujagić	(Bosnia and Herzegovina)	3 January 1998 (age 28)	(Malaysia) Sabah	2026	
	Fergus Tierney	(Malaysia) (Scotland)	19 March 2003 (age 23)	(Malaysia) Sabah	2020	
	Azam Azmi	(Malaysia)	12 February 2001 (age 25)	(Malaysia) Terengganu	2024	
Left during the season
36	Raúl Parra	(Spain)	26 November 1999 (age 26)	(Spain) Eldense (S2)	2025	2026

=== Johor Darul Ta'zim II ===
As of 1 January 2026

Squad no.	Name	Nationality	Date of birth (age)	Previous club	Contract since	Contract end
Goalkeepers
22	Zulhilmi Sharani	(Malaysia)	5 April 2004 (age 22)	(Malaysia) Johor Darul Ta'zim III	2019	2026
24	Danial Idraqi	(Malaysia)	5 October 2006 (age 20)	(Malaysia) Johor Darul Ta'zim III	2019	2026
	Harith El Aqil	(Malaysia)		(Malaysia) Johor Darul Ta'zim III	2024	2025
Defenders
3	Dinesh Vikneswaran	(Malaysia)	26 August 2003 (age 23)	(Malaysia)	2024	2027
4	Miquel Cuesta	(Spain)	26 February 2006 (age 20)	(Spain) RCD Mallorca U19 (S5)	2025	2027
5	Junior Eldstål	(Malaysia) (England) (Sweden)	16 September 1991 (age 35)	(Indonesia) Dewa United (I1)	2022	2027
13	Aysar Hadi	(Malaysia)	4 September 2003 (age 23)	(Malaysia) Johor Darul Ta'zim III	2021	2027
14	Adam Daniel	(Malaysia)	14 October 2004 (age 22)	(Malaysia) Johor Darul Ta'zim III	2021	2027
17	Ariff Safwan	(Malaysia)	17 February 2005 (age 21)	(Malaysia) Johor Darul Ta'zim III		
21	Irfan Zakwan	(Malaysia)	14 February 2004 (age 22)	(Malaysia) Johor Darul Ta'zim III		2027
27	Fakrul Haikal	(Malaysia)	31 October 2004 (age 22)	(Malaysia) Johor Darul Ta'zim III	2020	2027
28	Adam Farhan	(Malaysia)	3 April 2004 (age 22)	(Malaysia) Johor Darul Ta'zim III	2020	2027
32	Alif Ahmad	(Malaysia)	28 February 2003 (age 23)	(Malaysia) Johor Darul Ta'zim III	2024	2027
36	Ridwan Rosli	(Malaysia)	17 March 2005 (age 21)	(Malaysia) Johor Darul Ta'zim III		2026
37	Shafizah Arshad	(Malaysia)	5 August 2005 (age 21)	(Malaysia) Johor Darul Ta'zim III		2026
	Haziq Ridhwan	(Malaysia)		(Malaysia) Johor Darul Ta'zim III	2024	2025
	Naqiu Aiman	(Malaysia)		(Malaysia) Johor Darul Ta'zim III	2020	2025
	Shazriman Hasnul	(Malaysia)		(Malaysia) Johor Darul Ta'zim III	2024	2025
	Marwan Abdul Rahman	(Malaysia)	1 February 2003 (age 23)	(Malaysia) Johor Darul Ta'zim III	2021	2026
Midfielders
6	Danish Hakimi	(Malaysia)	6 January 2005 (age 21)	(Malaysia) Johor Darul Ta'zim III	2021	2027
7	Najmuddin Akmal	(Malaysia)	11 January 2003 (age 23)	(Malaysia) Johor Darul Ta'zim III	2022	2027
8	Danish Irham	(Malaysia)	16 November 2003 (age 23)	(Malaysia) Johor Darul Ta'zim III	2024	2027
10	Danish Syamer Tajiuddin	(Malaysia)	8 July 2004 (age 22)	(Malaysia) Negeri Sembilan II	2024	2027
12	Ziad El Basheer	(Malaysia)	24 December 2003 (age 22)	(Malaysia) Johor Darul Ta'zim III	2021	2027
16	Irfan Shahkimi	(Malaysia)	19 January 2004 (age 22)	(Malaysia) Johor Darul Ta'zim III		2027
18	Daryl Sham	(Malaysia)	30 November 2002 (age 23)	(Malaysia) Johor Darul Ta'zim III	2022	2027
19	Aznil Hafiz	(Malaysia)	7 June 2003 (age 23)	(Malaysia) Johor Darul Ta'zim III	2021	2027
20	Danish Zahir	(Malaysia)	20 June 2003 (age 23)	(Malaysia) Johor Darul Ta'zim III	2024	2027
23	Naim Zainudin	(Malaysia)	28 March 2005 (age 21)	(Malaysia) Johor Darul Ta'zim III		2027
29	Syukur Fariz	(Malaysia)	5 January 2003 (age 23)	(Malaysia) Johor Darul Ta'zim III	2021	2027
31	Faris Danish	(Malaysia)	4 July 2006 (age 20)	(Malaysia) Johor Darul Ta'zim III		2027
60	Hong Wan	(Malaysia) (England)	17 August 2000 (age 26)	(England) Wolverhampton Wanderers U23	2021	2026
72	Ibrahim Manusi	(Malaysia)	30 September 2001 (age 25)	(Malaysia) Pahang	2025	2026
76	Jean Franco Casquete	(Colombia)	14 May 2004 (age 22)	(United Arab Emirates) Fursan Hispania		2026
77	Enzo Lombardo	(France) (Philippines)	16 April 1997 (age 29)	(Spain) SD Huesca (S2)	2024	2026
	Harif Mustaqim Hamdan	(Malaysia)		(Malaysia) Johor Darul Ta'zim III	2021	
Forwards
9	Celso Bermejo	(Spain)	9 January 2005 (age 21)	(Spain) Villarreal CF C (S5)	2025	2027
15	Mohamadou Sumareh	(Malaysia) (The Gambia)	20 September 1994 (age 32)	(Thailand) Police Tero (T1)	2021	2026
Players who are loan to other clubs
1	Haziq Aiman	(Malaysia)	19 January 2005 (age 21)	(Malaysia) Johor Darul Ta'zim III	2024	2026
Players who had left other clubs during the season
11	G. Pavithran	(Malaysia)	10 January 2005 (age 21)		2026	

=== Johor Darul Ta'zim III ===
As of 1 January 2026

Squad no.	Name	Nationality	Date of birth (age)	Previous club	Contract since	Contract end
Goalkeepers
1	Faez Iqhwan	(Malaysia)	3 February 2007 (age 19)	(Malaysia) Mokhtar Dahari Academy	2024	
24	Danial Idraqi	(Malaysia)	5 October 2006 (age 20)	(Malaysia) Johor Darul Ta'zim IV		
27	Nizhareef Irfan	(Malaysia)	21 March 2006 (age 20)	(Malaysia) Johor Darul Ta'zim IV		
51	Januwaar Gopal	(Malaysia)	15 February 2007 (age 19)	(Malaysia) Johor Darul Ta'zim IV		
Defenders
2	Afiq Hakimi	(Malaysia)	4 January 2007 (age 19)	(Malaysia) Mokhtar Dahari Academy	2024	
3	Raja Norfirdaus	(Malaysia)	28 January 2006 (age 20)	(Malaysia) Johor Darul Ta'zim IV		
4	Ariff Safwan	(Malaysia)	17 February 2005 (age 21)	(Malaysia) Johor Darul Ta'zim IV		2026
5	Faris Danish	(Malaysia)	4 July 2006 (age 20)	(Malaysia) Mokhtar Dahari Academy		2026
11	Qahir Dzakirin	(Malaysia)	19 March 2006 (age 20)	(Malaysia) Johor Darul Ta'zim IV		
15	Adib Ibrahim	(Malaysia)	16 August 2006 (age 20)	(Malaysia) Johor Darul Ta'zim IV		
21	Iyad Hadi Hakimi	(Malaysia)	15 January 2005 (age 21)	(Malaysia) Johor Darul Ta'zim IV		
23	Aqim Hazmi	(Malaysia)	9 June 2006 (age 20)	(Malaysia) Mokhtar Dahari Academy		
26	Danish Darus	(Malaysia)	19 March 2006 (age 20)	(Malaysia) Mokhtar Dahari Academy		
28	Haziq Hafiz	(Malaysia)	4 August 2006 (age 20)	(Malaysia) Johor Darul Ta'zim IV		
29	Azim Assyakrin	(Malaysia)	4 January 2007 (age 19)	(Malaysia) Johor Darul Ta'zim IV		
31	Ariff Rosidi	(Malaysia)	3 March 2005 (age 21)	(Malaysia) Johor Darul Ta'zim IV		
Midfielders
6	Aisy Al-Hakim	(Malaysia)	13 January 2007 (age 19)	(Malaysia) Johor Darul Ta'zim IV		
7	Muhammad Wafiq Saiby	(Malaysia)	1 April 2005 (age 21)	(Malaysia) Johor Darul Ta'zim IV		
8	Danish Pesenti	(Malaysia) (Italy)	9 January 2005 (age 21)	(Italy) Vado Ligure		
13	Don Damien Derwin	(Malaysia)	1 October 2006 (age 20)	(Malaysia) Johor Darul Ta'zim IV		
16	Ammar Shauqi	(Malaysia)	16 March 2006 (age 20)	(Malaysia) Johor Darul Ta'zim IV		
17	Hilmi Farish	(Malaysia)	3 July 2006 (age 20)	(Malaysia) Johor Darul Ta'zim IV		
18	Afiq Danish Zulkifli	(Malaysia)	14 February 2006 (age 20)	(Malaysia) Mokhtar Dahari Academy	2024	
19	Faiq Hakim	(Malaysia)	24 January 2005 (age 21)	(Malaysia) Johor Darul Ta'zim IV		
22	Arami Wafiy	(Malaysia)	30 March 2006 (age 20)	(Malaysia) Mokhtar Dahari Academy	2024	
25	Nur Irfan	(Malaysia)	14 April 2006 (age 20)	(Malaysia) Johor Darul Ta'zim IV		
34	Danish Hakimi	(Malaysia)	16 January 2005 (age 21)	(Malaysia) Johor Darul Ta'zim IV		
Strikers
9	Abid Safaraz	(Malaysia)	6 March 2007 (age 19)	(Malaysia) Johor Darul Ta'zim IV		
10	Muhammad Daniesh Amirruddin	(Malaysia)	3 August 2006 (age 20)	(Malaysia) Johor Darul Ta'zim IV		
12	Mohamad Zamir Zairi	(Malaysia)	6 October 2006 (age 20)	(Malaysia) Johor Darul Ta'zim IV		
14	Muhammad Naim Zainudin	(Malaysia)	28 March 2005 (age 21)	(Malaysia) Johor Darul Ta'zim IV		
20	Nor Ezawi	(Malaysia)	25 May 2005 (age 21)	(Malaysia) Johor Darul Ta'zim IV		
Players who had left other clubs on loan during the season

== Coaching staff ==
Position	Name
CEO	(Spain) Luis García
COO	(Australia) Alistair Edwards
Sporting Director	(Argentina) Martín Prest (Spain) Kiko Insa
Technical Director	(Australia) Alistair Edwards
Head Coach (JDT)	(Spain) Xisco Munoz
Asst. Head Coach (JDT)	(Spain) José Javier López Sancho
Asst. Head Coach (JDT)	(Spain) Roberto Cuesta
Head Coach (JDT II)	(Spain) Josep Ferré
Asst. Coach	(Malaysia) Hamzani Omar
Asst. Coach	(Spain) Pablo Pérez Aleixandre
Goalkeeper coach	(Spain) Juan Jose Jiminez Poves
Fitness coaches	(Spain) Jorge Alvarez
Fitness coaches	(Spain) David Agustí
Physiotherapist	(Spain) Aitor Abal González (Spain) Enrique Portaz Castaño
Youth coach	(Greece) Dionysios Dokas
Video Analyst	(Spain) Adrián Sánchez

== Transfers ==
=== In ===
Preseason

Date	Position	Player	Transferred from	Ref
First team
31 May 2026	GK	(Malaysia) Haziq Aiman	(Malaysia) Melaka	Loan Return
31 May 2026	DF	(Malaysia) Azam Azmi	(Malaysia) Terengganu	Loan Return (Note: Azam Azmi moves back to Terengganu for another season of loan.)
31 May 2026	DF	(Malaysia) (England) Daniel Ting	(Thailand) Ratchaburi (Thai League 1)	Loan Return
31 May 2026	MF	(Malaysia) Danial Amier Norhisham	(Malaysia) Kuching City	Loan Return (Note: Danial Amier moves back to Kuching for another season of loan.)
31 May 2026	MF	(Malaysia) Umar Hakeem	(Malaysia) Melaka	Loan Return
31 May 2026	MF	(Malaysia) Aiman Danish	(Malaysia) Melaka	Loan Return
31 May 2026	MF	(Malaysia) (England) Declan Lambert	(Malaysia) Kuala Lumpur City	Loan Return (Note: Declan Lambert moves back to KL FC for another season of loan.)
31 May 2026	MF	(Malaysia) (England) Ryan Lambert	(Malaysia) Kuala Lumpur City	Loan Return (Note: Ryan Lambert moves back to KL FC for another season of loan.)
31 May 2026	FW	(Malaysia) Safawi Rasid	(Malaysia) Kuala Lumpur City	Loan Return
31 May 2026	FW	(Malaysia) Haqimi Azim	(Malaysia) Terengganu	Loan Return
31 May 2026	FW	(Italy) (Romania) (Sweden) (Brazil) Nicolao Dumitru	(Malaysia) Kuala Lumpur City	Loan Return
31 May 2026	FW	(Malaysia) Syafiq Ahmad	(Brunei) DPMM	Loan Return
31 May 2026	FW	(Malaysia) Gabriel Nistelrooy	(Malaysia) Kuching City	Loan Return
31 May 2026	FW	(Malaysia) (Scotland) Fergus Tierney	(Malaysia) Sabah	Loan Return
31 May 2026	FW	(Malaysia) Haqimi Azim	(Malaysia) Terengganu	Loan Return
1 July 2026	FW	(Iran) Shahab Zahedi	(Japan) Avispa Fukuoka	Free
2 July 2026	MF	(Slovenia) Dejan Petrovič	(Croatia) Rijeka	Free
2 July 2026	MF	(Australia) Brad Tapp	(Australia) Central Coast Mariners	Undisclosed
3 July 2026	DF	(Colombia) Kevin Medina	(Azerbaijan) Qarabağ FK	Free
31 July 2026	MF	(Spain) Stoichkov	(Spain) Granada CF	Free
7 August 2026	DF	(Equatorial Guinea) (Spain) Carlos Akapo	(Brazil) Amazonas	Free
8 August 2026	FW	(Spain) (Argentina) Matías Nahuel	(Israel) Maccabi Haifa	Free
9 August 2026	DF	(Malaysia) (Spain) Gabriel Palmero	(Malaysia) Kuching City	Free
24 August 2026	MF	(Spain) Jon Yeabsera Landa	(Spain) Touring KE	Free
31 August 2026	DF	(Brazil) Dani Bolt	(Azerbaijan) Qarabağ FK	Free
August 2026	FW	(Spain) Mario Losada	(Spain) Zamora	Free
JDT II

=== Out ===
Preseason

Date	Position	Player	Transferred To	Ref
First team
1 June 2026	DF	(Malaysia) (England) Daniel Ting	(Thailand) Ratchaburi (Thai League 1)	Free
1 June 2026	DF	(Malaysia) Azam Azmi	(Malaysia) Terengganu	Season loan (Note: Azam Azmi moves back to Terengganu for another season of loan.)
16 June 2026	FW	(Malaysia) (Scotland) Fergus Tierney	(Cyprus) Omonia	Season loan
25 June 2026	FW	(Malaysia) Gabriel Nistelrooy	(Malaysia) Kuching City	Season Loan
2 July 2026	DF	(South Korea) Park Jun-heong	(Indonesia) Persik Kediri	Free
2 July 2026	MF	(Malaysia) Nazmi Faiz	(Malaysia) Kuching City	Season loan
2 July 2026	FW	(Bosnia and Herzegovina) Ajdin Mujagić	(Malaysia) Kuching City	Season loan
2 July 2026	MF	(Malaysia) Ibrahim Manusi	(Malaysia) Kuala Lumpur City	Season loan
2 July 2026	FW	(Brazil) Heberty	Released	
4 July 2026	FW	(Malaysia) Safawi Rasid	(Malaysia) Kuching City	Season loan
10 July 2026	MF	(Malaysia) Danial Amier Norhisham	(Malaysia) Terengganu	Season loan
13 July 2026	FW	(Malaysia) Haqimi Azim	(Malaysia) Penang	Season loan
17 July 2026	MF	(Malaysia) (England) Declan Lambert	(Malaysia) Kuching City	Season loan
17 July 2026	MF	(Malaysia) (England) Ryan Lambert	(Malaysia) Kuching City	Season loan
21 July 2026	FW	(Malaysia) (Colombia) Romel Morales	(Malaysia) Terengganu	Season loan
19 August 2026	FW	(Malaysia) Syafiq Ahmad	(Malaysia) Kuala Lumpur City	Free
21 August 2026	DF	(Spain) Raúl Parra	(Slovenia) NK Bravo	Free
7 September 2026	MF	(Spain) (Philippines) Teto	(Spain) CE Europa	Free
August 2026	MF	(France) (Philippines) Enzo Lombardo	Not registered for tournament	
JDT II
1 July 2026	GK	(Malaysia) Nur Lokman Abdullah	(Malaysia)	Free
1 July 2026	MF	(Malaysia) Rafiefikri Rosman	(Malaysia)	Free
1 July 2026	FW	(Malaysia) Raziq Rahman	(Malaysia) Kelantan City	Free
1 July 2026	FW	(Malaysia) Abdul Raziq Rahman	(Malaysia) Kelantan City	Free
1 July 2026	FW	(Malaysia) Danie Asyraf	(Malaysia) Penang	Free
5 July 2026	MF	(Malaysia) Alif Mutalib	(Malaysia) Negeri Sembilan	Undisclosed
7 July 2026	MF	(Malaysia) Umar Hakeem	(Malaysia) Negeri Sembilan	Season loan
14 August 2026	GK	(Malaysia) Hafiz Azizi	(Malaysia) Melaka	Free
28 August 2026	MF	(Malaysia) G. Pavithran	(Malaysia) Terengganu	Undisclosed
28 August 2026	GK	(Malaysia) Haziq Aiman	(Malaysia) Kuching City	Season loan

== Friendly matches ==
Win Draw Loss

JDT

=== Tour of Spain (13–31 July 2026) ===
16 July 2026 1	(S1) Rangers FC (Scotland)	2–2	(Malaysia) Johor Darul Ta'zim	La Nucia, Spain
	Tochi Chukwuani 60', 65'	Report	Bergson 45', 49'	Stadium: Estadi Olímpic Camilo Cano

19 July 2026 2	(S1) Al-Ettifaq (Saudi Arabia)	3–2	(Malaysia) Johor Darul Ta'zim	La Nucia, Spain
			Shahab Zahedi 84'; Bergson 90+2'	Stadium: Estadi Olímpic Camilo Cano

20 July 2026 3	(S5) CD Contestano (Spain)	0–8	(Malaysia) Johor Darul Ta'zim	Benidorm, Spain
			Bergson 14', 17'; Ager Aketxe 25'; Stuart Wilkin 37'; Manuel Hidalgo 43', 57'; Matthew Davies 47'; Miguel Cuesta 89'	Stadium: Melia Villaitana Training Center

24 July 2026 4	(S1) Elche CF (Spain)	0–0	(Malaysia) Johor Darul Ta'zim	La Nucia, Spain
				Stadium: Estadi Olímpic Camilo Cano

25 July 2026 5	(S5) UD Castellonense (Spain)	1–1	(Malaysia) Johor Darul Ta'zim	Benidorm, Spain
			Matthew Davies 50'	Stadium: Melia Villaitana Training Center

27 July 2026 6	(S5) Club Costa City (Spain)	cancelled	(Malaysia) Johor Darul Ta'zim	Spain

28 July 2026 7	(S5) Asociación de Futbolistas Españoles (Spain)	1–1	(Malaysia) Johor Darul Ta'zim	La Nucia, Spain
			Oscar Arribas 23'	Stadium: Estadi Olímpic Camilo Cano

30 July 2026 9	(Q1) Qatar SC	2–2	(Malaysia) Johor Darul Ta'zim	La Nucia, Spain
			Shahab Zahedi 40'; Brad Trapp 90'	Stadium: Estadi Olímpic Camilo Cano

31 July 2026 10	(S3) FC Cartagena (Spain)	0–2	(Malaysia) Johor Darul Ta'zim	Cartagena, Spain
			Oscar Arribas 48'; Marcos Guilherme 61'	Stadium: Estadio Cartagonova

Others

9 August 2026 11	Johor Darul Ta'zim (Malaysia)	3–3	(England) Chelsea	Johor, Malaysia
	Aiman 14'; Israfilov (yellow card) 44'; Silva (yellow card) 52'; Arribas 65'; Glauder (yellow card) 68'; Bérgson 86'	Report	Delap 42' (pen.) 62' (pen.), (yellow card) 45'; Estêvão (yellow card) 54'; Jackson (yellow card) 66'; Quenda (yellow card) 75'; Glauder 89' (o.g.); Watson (yellow card) 90+2'	Stadium: Sultan Ibrahim Stadium; Attendance: 28,741; Referee: Tuan Mohd Yasin

15 August 2026 12	Johor Darul Ta'zim (Malaysia)	6-0	(Singapore) Tanjong Pagar United	Johor, Malaysia
	Marcos Guilherme 14', 20'; Bergson 38', 53'; Shahab Zahedi 65', 67'			Stadium: Sultan Ibrahim Stadium

== Competitions (JDT) ==
=== Overview ===
Competition	First match	Last match	Starting round	Record							
Competition	First match	Last match	Starting round	Pld	W	D	L	GF	GA	GD	Win %
Malaysia Super League (Note: Includes the Charity Shield.)	21 August 2026		Matchday 1	6	6	0	0	28	0	+28	100.00
Malaysia FA Cup	1 September 2026		Round of 16	6	6	0	0	33	5	+28	100.00
Malaysia Cup				0	0	0	0	0	0	+0	—
AFC Champions League Elite	15 September 2026		League stage	4	2	1	1	6	3	+3	50.00
ASEAN Club Championship	8 October 2026		Group stage	2	2	0	0	9	1	+8	100.00
Total				18	16	1	1	76	9	+67	88.89

Last updated: 19 November 2026
Source: Competitions

=== Malaysia Super League ===
Win Draw Loss

21 August 2026 1	Johor Darul Ta'zim	3–0	Kuching	Johor
	Marcos Guilherme 11'; Óscar Arribas 55'; Shahab Zahedi 85'; Matías Nahuel (yellow card) 16'	Report		Stadium: Sultan Ibrahim Stadium; Referee: Izzul Fikri

29 August 2026 2	Johor Darul Ta'zim	7–0	Star City	Johor
	Bergson 17', 35', 77' (pen.); Marcos Guilherme 27'; Shahab Zahedi 45+5'; Kevin Medina 43'; Carlos Akapo 68'; Matías Nahuel (yellow card) 22'		Aiman Yusni (yellow card) 58'	Stadium: Sultan Ibrahim Stadium

21 February 2027 3 (Rescheduled)	DPMM	–	Johor Darul Ta'zim	Bandar Seri Begawan
				Stadium: Hassanal Bolkiah National Stadium

11 September 2026 4	Johor Darul Ta'zim	3–0	Negeri Sembilan	Johor
	Shahab Zahedi 12'; Bergson 32'; Marcos Guilherme 66'		Park Yi-Young (yellow card) 42'	Stadium: Sultan Ibrahim Stadium

18 October 2026 5	Terengganu	0–3	Johor Darul Ta'zim	Terengganu
	Gervane Kastaneer (yellow card) 40'; Haziq Kutty (yellow card) 74'		Bergson 26'; Óscar Arribas 42'; Shahab Zahedi 89'; Ignacio Méndez (yellow card) 12'	Stadium: Sultan Mizan Zainal Abidin Stadium

26 August 2026 6 (Rescheduled)	Johor Darul Ta'zim	9–0	Kelantan Red Warriors	Johor
	Stoichkov 2'; Shahab Zahedi 37', 50', 61'; Muhammad Faudzi 45+2' (o.g.); Jairo Da Silva 49'; Matías Nahuel 78'; Eddy İsrafilov 82'; Arif Aiman 90'; Afiq Fazail (yellow card) 87'		Niam Mulhassan Alias (yellow card) 40'; Phillip Dandada Musa (yellow card) 54'	Stadium: Sultan Ibrahim Stadium

23 December 2026 7 (Rescheduled)	Johor Darul Ta'zim	–	Selangor	Johor
				Stadium: Sultan Ibrahim Stadium

30 December 2026 8 (Rescheduled)	Melaka	–	Johor Darul Ta'zim	Melaka
				Stadium: Hang Jebat Stadium

6 December 2026 9	Johor Darul Ta'zim	–	Kuala Lumpur City	Johor
				Stadium: Sultan Ibrahim Stadium

13 December 2026 10	Penang	–	Johor Darul Ta'zim	Georgetown
				Stadium: City Stadium Penang

20 December 2026 11	Johor Darul Ta'zim	–	Sabah	Johor
				Stadium: Sultan Ibrahim Stadium

26 January 2027 12 (Rescheduled)	Kuching	–	Johor Darul Ta'zim	Kuching
				Stadium: Sarawak Stadium

9 January 2027 13	Kelantan Red Warrior	–	Johor Darul Ta'zim	Kota Bahru
				Stadium: Sultan Muhammad IV Stadium

4 September 2026 14 (Rescheduled)	Johor Darul Ta'zim	3–0	DPMM	Johor
	Bergson 36', 39'; Stoichkov 89'; Antonio Glauder (yellow card) 65'			Stadium: Sultan Ibrahim Stadium

3 February 2027 15 (Rescheduled)	Sabah	–	Johor Darul Ta'zim	Kota Kinabalu
				Stadium: Likas Stadium

21 March 2027 16	Negeri Sembilan	–	Johor Darul Ta'zim	Paroi
				Stadium: Tuanku Abdul Rahman Stadium

4 April 2027 17	Johor Darul Ta'zim	–	Terengganu	Johor
				Stadium: Sultan Ibrahim Stadium

20 April 2027 18	Kuala Lumpur City	–	Johor Darul Ta'zim	Cheras
				Stadium: Kuala Lumpur Stadium

4 May 2027 19	Johor Darul Ta'zim	–	Penang	Johor
				Stadium: Sultan Ibrahim Stadium

8 May 2027 20	Star City	–	Johor Darul Ta'zim	Kangar
				Stadium: Tuanku Syed Putra Sports Complex

14 May 2027 21	Selangor	–	Johor Darul Ta'zim	Petaling Jaya
				Stadium: Petaling Jaya Stadium

May 2027 22	Johor Darul Ta'zim	–	Melaka	Johor
				Stadium: Sultan Ibrahim Stadium

Update:

==== Table ====
Pos	Team	Pld	W	D	L	GF	GA	GD	Pts	Qualification or relegation
1	Johor Darul Ta'zim	6	6	0	0	28	0	+28	18	Qualification for the AFC Champions League Elite league stage
2	Selangor	6	6	0	0	17	4	+13	18	Qualification for the AFC Champions League Two group stage
3	Kuching City	6	4	0	2	17	7	+10	12	
4	DPMM (Note: DPMM cannot qualify for Asian Football Confederation competitions as they are based in Brunei.)	6	4	0	2	9	8	+1	12	
5	Sabah	6	3	1	2	9	6	+3	10	

Updated to match(es) played on 1 November 2026. Source: Malaysian Football League
Rules for classification: 1) Points; 2) Goal difference; 3) Number of goals scored.

=== Malaysia FA Cup ===
1 September 2026 Round 1 Leg 1	UM-Damansara United	1–4	Johor Darul Ta'zim	Johor
	Amirul Akmal 90'		Jairo 5' (pen.); Dani Bolt 29'; Manuel Hidalgo 42', 54'	Stadium: Sultan Ibrahim Stadium

8 September 2026 Round 1 Leg 2	Johor Darul Ta'zim	10–0	UM-Damansara United	Johor
	Eddy İsrafilov 5', 80'; Stoichkov 22', 48'; Stuart Wilkin 32', 76'; Daniesh Amirruddin 57', 87'; Shahab Zahedi 77', 90+1'; Manuel Hidalgo (yellow card) 88'		Abdul Azim 90'	Stadium: Sultan Ibrahim Stadium

JDT won 14–1 on aggregate.

20 September 2026 Quarter Final Leg 1	Penang	2–7	Johor Darul Ta'zim	Georgetown
	Enzo Célestine 46'; Khala`if Naskam 90+7'; Haqimi Azim (yellow card) 25'		Bergson 16'; Brad Tapp 45+2', 70'; Marcos Guilherme 54'; Stoichkov 63'; Shahab Zahedi 67'; Arif Aiman 90+5'; Nene (yellow card) 15'	Stadium: City Stadium Penang

9 October 2026 Quarter Final Leg 2	Johor Darul Ta'zim	4–1	Penang	Johor
	Bergson 13' (pen.); Ignacio Méndez 22'; Shahab Zahedi 45+1'; Manuel Hidalgo 71'; Jairo (yellow card) 60'; Matt Davies (yellow card) 84'		Stefano Brundo 85'	Stadium: Sultan Ibrahim Stadium

JDT won 11–3 on aggregate.

23 October 2026 Semi Final Leg 1	DPMM	0–2	Johor Darul Ta'zim	Bandar Seri Begawan
	Dalberto (yellow card) 55'		Bergson 21'; Eddy İsrafilov 72' (yellow card) 79'	Stadium: Hassanal Bolkiah National Stadium

8 November 2026 Semi Final Leg 2	Johor Darul Ta'zim	6–1	DPMM	Johor
	João Figueiredo 21'; Manuel Hidalgo 59'; Óscar Arribas 64'; Jairo 66'; Daniesh Amirruddin 88' (pen.); Marcos Guilherme 90+4'		Jordan Murray 49'	Stadium: Sultan Ibrahim Stadium

JDT won 8–1 on aggregate.

16 January 2027 Final	Johor Darul Ta'zim	–	Kuching City	Johor
				Stadium: Sultan Ibrahim Stadium

=== AFC Champions League Elite ===
==== League stage ====
Win Draw Loss

Pos	Team	Pld	W	D	L	GF	GA	GD	Pts	Qualification
5	(China) Shanghai Port	4	2	1	1	13	10	+3	7	Advance to round of 16
6	(Japan) Kyoto Sanga	4	2	1	1	6	3	+3	7	Advance to round of 16
6	(Malaysia) Johor Darul Ta'zim	4	2	1	1	6	3	+3	7	Advance to round of 16
8	(South Korea) Jeonbuk Hyundai Motors	4	2	1	1	6	5	+1	7	Advance to round of 16
9	(China) Beijing Guoan	4	2	1	1	10	10	0	7	

Updated to match(es) played on 4 November 2026. Source: AFC
Rules for classification: 1) points; 2) goal difference; 3) number of goals scored; 4) number of matches won; 5) penalty shoot-out if only two teams remain tied and played each other on the final matchday 6) fair play ranking; 7) drawing of lots

15 September 2026 1	Johor Darul Ta'zim (Malaysia)	1–1	(Thailand) Buriram United	Johor, Malaysia
	Óscar Arribas 26'; Bergson (penalty missed) 86; Jonathan Silva (yellow card) 17'; Afiq Fazail (yellow card) 25'; Shahab Zahedi (yellow card) 45+1'; Kevin Medina (yellow card) 64'; Eddy Israfilov (red card) 90'	Report	Stefan Schimmer 43'; Kenny Dougall (yellow card) 35' (yellow-red card) 57'	Stadium: Sultan Ibrahim Stadium; Attendance: 32,325; Referee: Majed Al-Shamrani (Saudi Arabia)

13 October 2026 2	Pohang Steelers (South Korea)	0–2	(Malaysia) Johor Darul Ta'zim	Pohang, South Korea
	Jeon Min-gwang (red card) 44'; Juninho Rocha (yellow card) 45+2'	Report	Marcos Guilherme 49', 89'; Shahab Zahedi (yellow card) 10'; Antonio Glauder (yellow card) 74'	Stadium: Pohang Steel Yard; Attendance: 2,594; Referee: Adham Makhadmeh (Jordan)

27 October 2026 3	Johor Darul Ta'zim (Malaysia)	3–0	(Thailand) Port	Johor, Malaysia
	Jonathan Silva 53'; Bergson 62' (yellow card) 64'; Stoichkov 62' (yellow card) 89'	Report	Suphanan Bureerat (yellow card) 89'	Stadium: Sultan Ibrahim Stadium; Attendance: 19,174; Referee: Alireza Faghani (Australia)

3 November 2026 4	Jeonbuk Hyundai Motors (South Korea)	2–0	(Malaysia) Johor Darul Ta'zim	Jeonju, South Korea
	Bruno Mota 22' (yellow card) 58'; Italo 45+2' (pen.)	Report		Stadium: Jeonju World Cup Stadium; Attendance: 3,370; Referee: Khalid Al-Turais (Saudi Arabia)

24 November 2026 5	Ratchaburi (Thailand)	–	(Malaysia) Johor Darul Ta'zim	Ratchaburi, Thailand
				Stadium: Ratchaburi Stadium

1 December 2026 6	Johor Darul Ta'zim (Malaysia)	–	(South Korea) Daejeon Hana Citizen	Johor, Malaysia
				Stadium: Sultan Ibrahim Stadium

9 February 2027 7	Newcastle Jets (Australia)	–	(Malaysia) Johor Darul Ta'zim	Newcastle, Australia
				Stadium: McDonald Jones Stadium

16 February 2027 8	Johor Darul Ta'zim (Malaysia)	–	(Vietnam) Công An Hà Nội	Johor, Malaysia
				Stadium: Sultan Ibrahim Stadium

=== ASEAN Club Championship ===
==== Group stage ====
Pos	Team	Pld	W	D	L	GF	GA	GD	Pts	Qualification	JDT	SIB	CAH	PKR	LCS	POR	SUN
1	(Malaysia) Johor Darul Ta'zim	2	2	0	0	9	1	+8	6	Advance to knockout stage	—	—	—	6–0	1 Apr	—	10 Dec
2	(Indonesia) Persib	2	2	0	0	9	1	+8	6	Advance to knockout stage	17 Dec	—	4 Mar	—	—	—	6–0
3	(Vietnam) Công An Hà Nội	2	1	0	1	2	3	−1	3	Advance to knockout stage	1–3	—	—	10 Dec	—	—	25 Feb
4	(Cambodia) PKR Svay Rieng	2	1	0	1	4	7	−3	3	Advance to knockout stage	—	25 Feb	—	—	17 Dec	4–1	—
5	(Singapore) Lion City Sailors	1	0	0	1	0	1	−1	0		—	10 Dec	0–1	—	—	25 Feb	—
6	(Thailand) Port	2	0	0	2	2	7	−5	0		4 Mar	1–3	1 Apr	—	—	—	—
7	(Myanmar) Shan United	1	0	0	1	0	6	−6	0		—	—	—	1 Apr	4 Mar	17 Dec	—

Updated to match(es) played on 19 November 2026. Source: ASEAN United
Rules for classification: Tiebreakers

8 October 2026 1	Johor Darul Ta'zim (Malaysia)	6–0	(Cambodia) PKR Svay Rieng	Johor, Malaysia
	Arif Aiman 39'; Marcos Guilherme 51'; Kevin Medina 61'; Shahab Zahedi 70'; Daniesh Amirruddin 78', 86'; Stoichkov (yellow card) 33'; Shane Lowry (yellow card) 66'; Carlos Akapo (yellow card) 74'	Report	Sieng Chanthea (yellow card) 13'; Mateus Barbosa (yellow card) 33'	Stadium: Sultan Ibrahim Stadium; Attendance: 15,451; Referee: Kim Woo-Sung (South Korea); Man of the Match: (Brazil) Marcos Guilherme

19 November 2026 2	Công An Hà Nội (Vietnam)	1–3	(Malaysia) Johor Darul Ta'zim	Hanoi, Vietnam
	Nené 3' (o.g.)	Report	Óscar Arribas 50', 85'; Marcos Guilherme 60'; Shane Lowry (yellow card) 58'; Brad Tapp (yellow card) 65'; Carlos Akapo (yellow card) 78'	Stadium: Hàng Đẫy Stadium; Referee: Rustam Lutfullin (Uzbekistan)

10 December 2026 3	Johor Darul Ta'zim (Malaysia)	–	(Myanmar) Shan United	Johor, Malaysia
		Report		Stadium: Sultan Ibrahim Stadium

17 December 2026 4	Persib Bandung (Indonesia)	–	(Malaysia) Johor Darul Ta'zim	Bandung, Indonesia
		Report		Stadium: Gelora Bandung Lautan Api

4 March 2027 5	Port (Thailand)	–	(Malaysia) Johor Darul Ta'zim	Bangkok, Thailand
		Report		Stadium: PAT Stadium

1 April 2027 6	Johor Darul Ta'zim (Malaysia)	–	(Singapore) Lion City Sailors	Johor, Malaysia
		Report		Stadium: Sultan Ibrahim Stadium

== Club statistics ==
Correct as of match played @ 19 November 2026

No.	Pos.	Player	Malaysia Super League		FA Cup		Malaysia Cup		AFC Champions League Elite		ASEAN Club Championship		Total	
No.	Pos.	Player	Apps.	Goals	Apps.	Goals	Apps.	Goals	Apps.	Goals	Apps.	Goals	Apps.	Goals
1	GK	(Malaysia) (Spain) Christian Abad Amat	1	0	5	0	0	0	0	0	1	0	7	0
2	DF	(Malaysia) (Australia) Matthew Davies	1	0	2	0	0	0	0	0	0	0	3	0
3	DF	(Malaysia) Shahrul Saad	0	0	0	0	0	0	0	0	0	0	0	0
4	MF	(Malaysia) Afiq Fazail	3+3	0	2+1	0	0	0	1+1	0	2	0	13	0
5	DF	(Spain) (Philippines) Antonio Glauder	3	0	1	0	0	0	4	0	0	0	8	0
6	MF	(Malaysia) (England) Hong Wan	0	0	1	0	0	0	0	0	0	0	1	0
7	FW	(Iran) Shahab Zahedi	4+2	7	2+1	3	0	0	4	0	1+1	1	15	11
8	MF	(Malaysia) (Netherlands) Hector Hevel	0	0	0	0	0	0	0	0	0	0	0	0
9	FW	(Malaysia) (Brazil) Bergson	5+1	7	2	2	0	0	0+3	1	0	0	11	10
10	FW	(Malaysia) Arif Aiman	6	1	1+1	1	0	0	4	0	2	0	14	2
11	FW	(Brazil) Jairo	2+2	1	3+2	2	0	0	0+3	0	1+1	0	14	3
12	MF	(Malaysia) (England) Stuart Wilkin	0+1	0	2	2	0	0	0	0	0	0	3	2
13	MF	(Spain) Jon Yeabsera Landa	0+1	0	0	0	0	0	0	0	0	0	1	0
14	DF	(Malaysia) (Republic of Ireland) (Australia) Shane Lowry	2+1	0	0	0	0	0	0	0	2	0	5	0
15	DF	(Malaysia) Feroz Baharudin	0	0	1	0	0	0	0	0	0	0	1	0
16	GK	(Malaysia) Syihan Hazmi	5	0	0	0	0	0	4	0	1	0	10	0
17	DF	(Malaysia) (Spain) Jon Irazabal	0	0	1	0	0	0	0+1	0	0	0	2	0
18	MF	(Portugal) Nené	0	0	4	0	0	0	0	0	2	0	6	0
19	MF	(Spain) Stoichkov	1+5	2	1+2	3	0	0	0+2	1	2	0	13	6
20	MF	(Brazil) Dani Bolt	0+1	0	3+2	1	0	0	0	0	1	0	7	1
21	MF	(Slovenia) Dejan Petrovič	5	0	0	0	0	0	4	0	0	0	9	0
22	DF	(Malaysia) (Canada) Corbin-Ong	1+3	0	2+1	0	0	0	0	0	0+1	0	8	0
23	MF	(Azerbaijan) (Spain) Eddy Israfilov	1	1	3	3	0	0	1	0	0	0	5	3
24	MF	(Philippines) (Spain) Óscar Arribas	2+1	2	2	1	0	0	4	1	1+1	2	11	6
25	FW	(Malaysia) (Brazil) João Figueiredo	0	0	1	1	0	0	0+1	0	0	0	2	1
26	MF	(Malaysia) (Australia) Brad Tapp	5	0	3	2	0	0	0	0	1	0	9	2
27	DF	(Malaysia) (Spain) Gabriel Palmero	0	0	0	0	0	0	0	0	0	0	0	0
28	MF	(Malaysia) (Spain) (Cuba) Nacho Méndez	3+3	0	3+2	0	0	0	3+1	0	0	0	15	0
29	DF	(Equatorial Guinea) (Spain) Carlos Akapo	0+1	1	2+1	0	0	0	3+1	0	1+1	0	10	1
30	MF	(Malaysia) (Spain) Natxo Insa	0+1	0	1	0	0	0	0+1	0	0	0	3	0
33	DF	(Argentina) (Italy) Jonathan Silva	3	0	1	0	0	0	4	1	0	0	8	1
40	MF	(Malaysia) Daniesh Amirruddin	0+1	0	1+2	3	0	0	0	0	0+1	2	5	5
41	MF	(Malaysia) Syamer Kutty Abba	0	0	0	0	0	0	0	0	0	0	0	0
47	MF	(Spain) Ager Aketxe	0	0	0+2	0	0	0	0	0	0+1	0	3	0
50	MF	(Malaysia) (Sweden) Junior Eldstål	0	0	0	0	0	0	0	0	0	0	0	0
58	GK	(Spain) Andoni Zubiaurre	0	0	0	0	0	0	0	0	0	0	0	0
77	MF	(Spain) (Argentina) Matías Nahuel	4+1	1	0	0	0	0	0+3	0	0	0	8	1
80	MF	(Malaysia) Danish Hakimi	0	0	0	0	0	0	0	0	0	0	0	0
81	DF	(Colombia) Kevin Medina	5	1	1	0	0	0	4	0	2	1	12	2
82	MF	(Malaysia) Fakrul Haikal	0	0	0	0	0	0	0	0	0	0	0	0
88	FW	(Malaysia) (Argentina) Manuel Hidalgo	1	0	5	3	0	0	0	0	0+1	0	7	3
91	DF	(Malaysia) Syahmi Safari	0	0	0	0	0	0	0	0	0	0	0	0
95	FW	(Brazil) Marcos Guilherme	3+1	3	1+1	2	0	0	4	2	2	1	12	8
97	FW	(Brazil) Yago	0	0	3+1	0	0	0	0	0	0+1	0	5	0
99	FW	(Spain) Celso Bermejo	0	0	0+1	0	0	0	0	0	0	0	1	0
Players who have contracts but have left on loan to other clubs
??	DF	(Malaysia) (England) Declan Lambert	0	0	0	0	0	0	0	0	0	0	0	0
??	MF	(Malaysia) (England) Ryan Lambert	0	0	0	0	0	0	0	0	0	0	0	0
??	DF	(Malaysia) Azam Azmi	0	0	0	0	0	0	0	0	0	0	0	0
??	MF	(Malaysia) Danial Amier Norhisham	0	0	0	0	0	0	0	0	0	0	0	0
??	FW	(Malaysia) Safawi Rasid	0	0	0	0	0	0	0	0	0	0	0	0
??	FW	(Malaysia) Syafiq Ahmad	0	0	0	0	0	0	0	0	0	0	0	0
??	FW	(Malaysia) (Scotland) Fergus Tierney	0	0	0	0	0	0	0	0	0	0	0	0
19	FW	(Malaysia) (Colombia) Romel Morales	0	0	0	0	0	0	0	0	0	0	0	0
27	MF	(Malaysia) Ibrahim Manusi	0	0	0	0	0	0	0	0	0	0	0	0
29	FW	(Bosnia and Herzegovina) Ajdin Mujagić	0	0	0	0	0	0	0	0	0	0	0	0
39	FW	(Malaysia) Gabriel Nisterroy	0	0	0	0	0	0	0	0	0	0	0	0
Players who have played this season but had left the club
??	MF	(France) (Philippines) Enzo Lombardo	0	0	0	0	0	0	0	0	0	0	0	0
??	MF	(Malaysia) (The Gambia) Mohamadou Sumareh	0	0	0	0	0	0	0	0	0	0	0	0
??	MF	(Malaysia) Nazmi Faiz	0	0	0	0	0	0	0	0	0	0	0	0
