= 2019–20 AD Alcorcón season =

AD Alcorcón
2019–20 season
- Owner: David Blitzer
- President: Iván Bravo
- Manager: Fran Fernández
- Stadium: Santo Domingo
- Segunda División: 10th
- Copa del Rey: First round
- Top goalscorer: League: Stoichkov (15 goals); All: Stoichkov (15 goals)
Home colours	Away colours	Third colours

The 2019–20 season was the 48th season of Agrupación Deportiva Alcorcón in existence and the club's 10th consecutive season in the second division of Spanish football. In addition to the domestic league, AD Alcorcón participated in this season's edition of the Copa del Rey. The season was due to cover a period from 1 July 2019 to 30 June 2020 before being extended due to the COVID-19 pandemic. In June 2019, Roland Duchâtelet sold the club to a group led by American investor David Blitzer for around €13 million.

== Players ==
=== Current squad ===
The numbers are established according to the official website: www.adalcorcon.com and www.lfp.es

As of 11 January 2020

Note: Flags indicate national team as defined under FIFA eligibility rules; some limited exceptions apply. Players may hold more than one non-FIFA nationality.

No.	Pos.	Nation	Player
1	GK	(Spain) ESP	Dani Jiménez
2	DF	(Spain) ESP	Laure
3	DF	(Spain) ESP	Carlos Pomares
5	MF	(Spain) ESP	Juan Aguilera
6	DF	(Spain) ESP	Adrián Diéguez (on loan from Alavés)
7	MF	(Ghana) GHA	Richard Boateng
8	MF	(Spain) ESP	Albert Dorca
9	FW	(Scotland) SCO	Jack Harper (on loan from Getafe)
10	MF	(Ukraine) UKR	Serhiy Myakushko
11	MF	(Spain) ESP	Ernesto Gómez
14	FW	(Spain) ESP	Dani Romera (on loan from Cádiz)
15	FW	(Portugal) POR	Rui Costa (on loan from Porto)
16	DF	(Spain) ESP	Carlos Bellvís (captain)

No.	Pos.	Nation	Player
17	MF	(Venezuela) VEN	Samuel Sosa (on loan from Talleres)
18	MF	(Spain) ESP	Álex Mula (on loan from Málaga)
19	DF	(Spain) ESP	David Fernández
20	DF	(Spain) ESP	Unai Elgezabal
21	FW	(Spain) ESP	Fran Sandaza
22	DF	(Spain) ESP	Paris Adot
23	MF	(Spain) ESP	Stoichkov (on loan from Mallorca)
24	MF	(Portugal) POR	Reko
26	FW	(Spain) ESP	Óscar Arribas
30	GK	(Spain) ESP	Samu Casado
31	GK	(Spain) ESP	Ximo Miralles
34	MF	(Spain) ESP	Luis Perea (on loan from Osasuna)

=== Out on loan ===
Note: Flags indicate national team as defined under FIFA eligibility rules; some limited exceptions apply. Players may hold more than one non-FIFA nationality.

No.	Pos.	Nation	Player
—	DF	(Democratic Republic of the Congo) COD	Jonathan Bijimine (at Algeciras until 30 June 2020)
—	MF	(Spain) ESP	Alfonso Martín (at Cultural Leonesa until 30 June 2020)
—	MF	(Spain) ESP	Isi Ros (at Recreativo until 30 June 2020)

No.	Pos.	Nation	Player
—	MF	(Spain) ESP	Alfred Planas (at Valencia Mestalla until 30 June 2020)
—	MF	(Spain) ESP	Daniel Toribio (at Racing Santander until 30 June 2020)

== Pre-season and friendlies ==
Win Draw Loss

== Competitions ==
=== Overview ===
Competition	First match	Last match	Starting round	Final position	Record							
Competition	First match	Last match	Starting round	Final position	Pld	W	D	L	GF	GA	GD	Win %
Segunda División	18 August 2019	20 July 2020	Matchday 1	10th	42	13	18	11	52	50	+2	30.95
Copa del Rey	17 December 2019		First round	First round	1	0	0	1	0	1	−1	0.00
Total					43	13	18	12	52	51	+1	30.23

Last updated: 20 July 2020
Source: Competitions

=== Segunda División ===
==== League table ====
Pos	Team	Pld	W	D	L	GF	GA	GD	Pts
8	Fuenlabrada	42	15	15	12	47	40	+7	60 (Note: Rayo Vallecano finished ahead of Fuenlabrada on head-to-head points: Fuenlabrada 2–2 Rayo Vallecano, Rayo Vallecano 1–0 Fuenlabrada.)
9	Las Palmas	42	14	15	13	49	46	+3	57
10	Alcorcón	42	13	18	11	52	50	+2	57
11	Mirandés	42	13	17	12	55	59	−4	56
12	Tenerife	42	14	13	15	50	46	+4	55

Source: LaLiga Soccerway
Rules for classification: 1) points; 2) head-to-head points; 3) head-to-head goal difference; 4) goal difference; 5) number of goals scored

==== Results summary ====
Overall								Home						Away					
Pld	W	D	L	GF	GA	GD	Pts	W	D	L	GF	GA	GD	W	D	L	GF	GA	GD
42	13	18	11	52	50	+2	57	6	6	9	24	29	−5	7	12	2	28	21	+7

Last updated: 20 July 2020.
Source: La Liga SmartBank

==== Results by round ====
Round	1	2	3	4	5	6	7	8	9	10	11	12	13	14	15	16	17	18	19	20	21	22	23	24	25	26	27	28	29	30	31	32	33	34	35	36	37	38	39	40	41	42
Ground	A	H	A	H	A	H	A	H	A	H	H	A	H	A	H	A	H	A	H	A	H	A	H	A	H	A	A	H	A	H	H	A	H	A	H	A	H	A	H	A	H	A
Result	W	L	W	L	D	W	D	L	D	L	W	D	D	W	D	W	D	L	L	D	D	D	D	D	W	D	L	W	D	W	L	W	L	D	W	W	D	D	L	D	L	W
Position	6	7	5	7	10	5	7	10	10	14	11	9	9	9	11	7	7	10	11	14	13	13	13	13	12	13	13	11	10	8	10	9	10	11	9	7	7	9	11	11	12	10

Updated to match(es) played on 20 July 2020. Source: La Liga SmartBank
A = Away; H = Home; W = Win; D = Draw; L = Loss

==== Matches ====
The fixtures were revealed on 4 July 2019.

18 August 2019 1	Numancia	0–1	Alcorcón	Soria
18:00 CEST (UTC+2)				Stadium: Los Pajaritos

24 August 2019 2	Alcorcón	1–2	Elche	Alcorcón
20:00 CEST (UTC+2)				Stadium: Santo Domingo

1 September 2019 3	Lugo	2–4	Alcorcón	Lugo
18:00 CEST (UTC+2)				Stadium: Anxo Carro

8 September 2019 4	Alcorcón	0–3	Zaragoza	Alcorcón
18:30 CEST (UTC+2)	Romera (yellow card) 16'	Report	Dwamena 12'; Suárez 42'; Grippo (yellow card) 52'; Kagawa (yellow card) 89'; Vigaray 90'	Stadium: Santo Domingo; Attendance: 3,436; Referee: Óliver de la Fuente Ramos

14 September 2019 5	Ponferradina	1–1	Alcorcón	Ponferrada
20:30 CEST (UTC+2)				Stadium: El Toralín

17 September 2019 6	Alcorcón	3–0	Cádiz	Alcorcón
21:00 CEST (UTC+2)	Stoichkov 45' (pen.), 51'; Ernesto 66' (pen.)	Report		Stadium: Santo Domingo; Attendance: 2,555; Referee: Gorka Sagués Oscoz

20 September 2019 7	Mirandés	2–2	Alcorcón	Miranda de Ebro
21:00 CEST (UTC+2)				Stadium: Anduva

28 September 2019 8	Alcorcón	0–2	Extremadura	Alcorcón
18:00 CEST (UTC+2)				Stadium: Santo Domingo

1 October 2019 9	Rayo Vallecano	1–1	Alcorcón	Madrid
21:00 CEST (UTC+2)				Stadium: Vallecas

4 October 2019 10	Alcorcón	0–1	Albacete	Alcorcón
21:00 CEST (UTC+2)				Stadium: Santo Domingo

12 October 2019 11	Sporting Gijón	1–3	Alcorcón	Gijón
16:00 CEST (UTC+2)		Report		Stadium: El Molinón

19 October 2019 12	Alcorcón	2–2	Almería	Alcorcón
16:00 CEST (UTC+2)		Report		Stadium: Santo Domingo

27 October 2019 13	Girona	0–0	Alcorcón	Girona
12:00 CEST (UTC+2)		Report		Stadium: Montilivi

2 November 2019 14	Alcorcón	1–0	Racing Santander	Alcorcón
18:00 CET (UTC+1)	Stoichkov 27'	Report		Stadium: Santo Domingo; Attendance: 2,727; Referee: Saúl Ais Reig

9 November 2019 15	Las Palmas	1–1	Alcorcón	Las Palmas
20:00 CET (UTC+1)				Stadium: Gran Canaria

17 November 2019 16	Alcorcón	1–0	Málaga	Alcorcón
14:00 CET (UTC+1)				Stadium: Santo Domingo

23 November 2019 17	Deportivo La Coruña	0–0	Alcorcón	A Coruña
18:00 CET (UTC+1)				Stadium: Abanca-Riazor

30 November 2019 18	Alcorcón	0–2	Huesca	Alcorcón
16:00 CET (UTC+1)				Stadium: Santo Domingo

6 December 2019 19	Alcorcón	1–3	Oviedo	Alcorcón
18:30 CET (UTC+1)				Stadium: Santo Domingo

14 December 2019 20	Tenerife	0–0	Alcorcón	Santa Cruz de Tenerife
18:00 CET (UTC+1)				Stadium: Heliodoro Rodríguez López

22 December 2019 21	Alcorcón	1–1	Fuenlabrada	Alcorcón
18:00 CET (UTC+1)				Stadium: Santo Domingo

3 January 2020 22	Extremadura	0–0	Alcorcón	Almendralejo
19:00 CET (UTC+1)				Stadium: Ciudad de Almendralejo

15 January 2020 23	Alcorcón	2–2	Numancia	Alcorcón
19:00 CET (UTC+1)				Stadium: Santo Domingo

19 January 2020 24	Elche	1–1	Alcorcón	Elche
12:00 CET (UTC+1)				Stadium: Martínez Valero

26 January 2020 25	Alcorcón	3–1	Ponferradina	Alcorcón
18:15 CET (UTC+1)				Stadium: Santo Domingo

2 February 2020 26	Racing Santander	1–1	Alcorcón	Santander
20:30 CET (UTC+1)	Figueras 61'	Report	Stoichkov 10'	Stadium: El Sardinero; Attendance: 14,154; Referee: Jorge Figueroa Vázquez

9 February 2020 27	Alcorcón	0–1	Deportivo La Coruña	Alcorcón
12:00 CET (UTC+1)				Stadium: Santo Domingo

15 February 2020 28	Oviedo	1–2	Alcorcón	Oviedo
18:15 CET (UTC+1)				Stadium: Carlos Tartiere

22 February 2020 29	Alcorcón	1–1	Las Palmas	Alcorcón
16:00 CET (UTC+1)				Stadium: Santo Domingo

1 March 2020 30	Fuenlabrada	3–4	Alcorcón	Fuenlabrada
18:15 CET (UTC+1)	Juanma 37'; Salvador 70'; Fraile 77' (pen.)	Report	Perea 28', 43'; Stoichkov 30'; Arribas 90+4'	Stadium: Fernando Torres; Attendance: 5,012; Referee: Javier Iglesias Villanueva

8 March 2020 32	Alcorcón	1–2	Mirandés	Alcorcón
18:15 CET (UTC+1)				Stadium: Santo Domingo

13 June 2020 32	Zaragoza	1–3	Alcorcón	Zaragoza
21:30 CET (UTC+1)	Guitián (yellow card) 12'; Álvarez (red card) 78'; Linares 90+3'	Report	Dorca (yellow card) 36'; Stoichkov 71', 74'; Sandaza 84'	Stadium: La Romareda; Attendance: 0 Referee: Juan Luis Pulido Santana

18 June 2020 33	Alcorcón	0–2	Sporting Gijón	Alcorcón
21:45 CEST (UTC+2)				Stadium: Santo Domingo; Attendance: 0

21 June 2020 34	Cádiz	1–1	Alcorcón	Cádiz
19:30 CEST (UTC+2)	Lozano 68'	Report	Stoichkov 48'	Stadium: Ramón de Carranza; Attendance: 0 Referee: Alejandro Muñiz Ruiz

25 June 2020 35	Almería	0–1	Alcorcón	Almería
19:30 CEST (UTC+2)	Appiah (yellow card) 4'; Balliu (yellow card) 63'; De la Hoz (yellow card) 82'; Maraš (yellow card) 87'; Muñoz (yellow card) 87'	Report	Ernesto 45'; Jiménez (yellow card) 72'; Bellvís (yellow card) 84'	Stadium: Estadio de los Juegos Mediterráneos; Attendance: 0 Referee: Iosu Galech Apezteguía

29 June 2020 36	Alcorcón	3–2	Rayo Vallecano	Alcorcón
21:00 CEST (UTC+2)	Ernesto 22', 46'; Diéguez (yellow card) 40'; Arribas 70'; Bellvís (yellow card) 83'	Report	Luna (yellow card) 22'; Trejo (yellow card) 27', (goal) 75' (pen.); Isi 45+3'; Catena (yellow card) 68'; Advíncula (yellow card) 87'; De Frutos (yellow card) 90+4'	Stadium: Santo Domingo; Attendance: 0 Referee: Javier Iglesias Villanueva

2 July 2020 37	Albacete	1–1	Alcorcón	Albacete
19:30 CEST (UTC+2)	Eddy (yellow card) 33'; Chema (yellow card) 41'; Ojeda 57'; Arroyo (yellow card) 59'; Fuster (yellow card) 78'	Report	Sandaza 9'; Pomares (yellow card) 41' (yellow-red card) 83'; Reko (yellow card) 44'; Boateng (yellow card) 79'; Adot (yellow card) 90+6'	Stadium: Carlos Belmonte; Attendance: 0 Referee: Víctor Areces Franco

5 July 2020 38	Alcorcón	2–2	Lugo	Alcorcón
21:45 CEST (UTC+2)	Costa 1', (yellow card) 59'; Mula 70', (yellow card) 71'; Boateng (yellow card) 90+1'; Arribas (yellow card) 90+5'	Report	Rahmani (yellow card) 36'; Carrillo 47', (yellow card) 51'; Seoane (yellow card) 49'; Campabadal (yellow card) 64'; Hacen 74'	Stadium: Santo Domingo; Attendance: 0 Referee: Jon Ander González Esteban

8 July 2020 39	Huesca	2–1	Alcorcón	Huesca
21:45 CEST (UTC+2)	González 21'; Galán (yellow card) 41'; Okazaki 45+3'; Luisinho (yellow card) 90+2'	Report	Sá 30' (o.g.); Ernesto (yellow card) 63'; Perea (yellow card) 82'	Stadium: El Alcoraz; Attendance: 0 Referee: Dámaso Arcediano Monescillo

13 July 2020 40	Alcorcón	0–0	Tenerife	Alcorcón
21:45 CEST (UTC+2)	Boateng (yellow card) 22'; Bellvís (yellow card) 59'; Elgezabal (yellow card) 89'; Diéguez (yellow card) 90+2'; Arribas (yellow card) 90+4'	Report	Sanz (yellow card) 6'; Lasure (yellow card) 13'	Stadium: Santo Domingo; Attendance: 0 Referee: Daniel Ocón Arráiz

17 July 2020 41	Málaga	2–0	Alcorcón	Málaga
21:00 CEST (UTC+2)	Juanpi 22'; Tete 79'	Report	Sandaza (yellow card) 65'; Bellvís (yellow card) 72'; Stoichkov (yellow card) 81'; Diéguez (yellow card) 86'	Stadium: La Rosaleda; Attendance: 0 Referee: Santiago Varón Aceitón

20 July 2020 42	Alcorcón	2–0	Girona	Alcorcón
21:00 CEST (UTC+2)	Sosa 56' (pen.); Arribas 74'	Report		Stadium: Santo Domingo; Attendance: 0 Referee: Juan Luis Pulido Santana

=== Copa del Rey ===
17 December 2019 First round	Cacereño	1–0	Alcorcón	Cáceres
20:00 CET (UTC+1)	Gustavo 50'	Report		Stadium: Príncipe Felipe; Attendance: 2,362; Referee: Oliver De La Fuente Ramos
