= Unai Elgezabal =

Spanish footballer

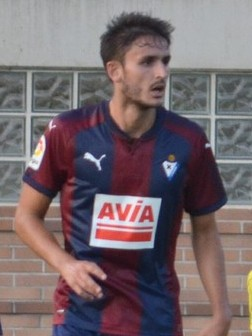
- Elgezabal with Eibar in 2017

Personal information
- Full name: Unai Elgezabal Udondo
- Date of birth: 25 April 1993 (age 33)
- Place of birth: Urduliz, Spain
- Height: 1.88 m (6 ft 2 in)
- Position: Centre-back

Team information
- Current team: Eibar
- Number: 4

Youth career
- 2007–2008: Leioa
- 2008–2012: Danok Bat

Senior career*
Years	Team	Apps	(Gls)
2012–2014	Basconia	39	(0)
2014–2015	Durango	33	(1)
2015–2016	Barakaldo	27	(2)
2016–2019	Eibar	0	(0)
2016–2017	→ Alcorcón (loan)	21	(0)
2017–2018	→ Numancia (loan)	19	(0)
2018–2019	→ Alcorcón (loan)	14	(0)
2019–2020	Alcorcón	25	(0)
2020–2024	Burgos	136	(4)
2024–2026	Levante	52	(1)
2026–	Eibar	0	(0)
- * Club domestic league appearances and goals as of 26 May 2026

Unai Elgezabal Udondo (born 25 April 1993) is a Spanish professional footballer who plays for SD Eibar. Mainly a central defender, he can also play as a defensive midfielder.

== Career ==
Born in Urduliz, Biscay, Basque Country, Elgezabal graduated from Danok Bat CF's youth setup. In 2012, he joined Athletic Bilbao and made his senior debut with the farm team in Tercera División, but was released in 2014.

In July 2014, Elgezabal joined SCD Durango also in the fourth tier. After being an undisputed starter, he moved to Segunda División B side Barakaldo CF on 1 July 2015.

In the 2016 winter transfer window, Elgezabal refused an offer from RCD Mallorca and remained at the Fabriles until the end of the campaign. On 20 June 2016, he signed for La Liga side SD Eibar, being loaned to AD Alcorcón in Segunda División on 18 August.

Elgezabal made his professional debut on 4 September 2016, starting in a 1–1 away draw against CD Numancia. After contributing with 21 appearances as his side avoided relegation, he moved to the latter club on 16 August 2017, on a one-year loan deal.

On 15 August 2018, Elgezabal renewed his contract until 2020 and returned to Alkor also in a one-year loan deal. The following 6 July, after returning from loan, he terminated his contract with the Armeros, and signed a permanent two-year deal with Alcorcón five days later.

On 10 September 2020, Elgezabal terminated his contract with Alcorcón, and signed for third division side Burgos CF fourteen days later. On 18 June 2024, after four seasons as a starter for the latter which included a promotion to the second division in his first year, he joined Levante UD on a one-year deal.

On 5 July 2025, after being an undisputed starter during the campaign as the Granotes achieved promotion to the top tier as champions, Elgezabal renewed his contract until 2027. He made his debut in the category on 16 August, starting in a 2–1 away loss to Deportivo Alavés, and scored his first goal in the division on 8 February 2026, but in a 4–2 loss at Athletic Bilbao.

On 4 August 2026, Elgezabal terminated his link with Levante, and returned to Eibar on a one-year deal the following day.

== International career ==
Elgezabal was called up to the Basque Country national team for a friendly match against Palestine on 15 November 2025.

== Career statistics ==
As of match played 14 February 2021

Appearances and goals by club, season and competition
Club	Season	League			National cup		Continental		Other		Total	
Club	Season	Division	Apps	Goals	Apps	Goals	Apps	Goals	Apps	Goals	Apps	Goals
Barakaldo	2015–16	Segunda División B	27	2	4	0	—		2 (Note: Appearance(s) in Segunda División Promotion)	0	33	2
Alcorcón (loan)	2016–17	Segunda División	21	0	7	0	—		—		28	0
Numancia (loan)	2017–18	Segunda División	19	0	4	1	—		2 (Note: Appearance(s) in La Liga Promotion)	0	25	1
Alcorcón (loan)	2018–19	Segunda División	14	0	2	0	—		—		16	0
Alcorcón	2019–20	Segunda División	25	0	0	0	—		—		25	0
Burgos	2020–21	Segunda División B	14	0	2	0	—		—		16	0
Career total			120	2	19	1	0	0	4	0	143	3

== Honours ==
Levante

- Segunda División: 2024–25
