= Stoichkov (Spanish footballer) =

Spanish footballer

Personal information
- Full name: Juan Diego Molina Martínez
- Date of birth: 5 November 1993 (age 33)
- Place of birth: San Roque, Spain
- Height: 1.78 m (5 ft 10 in)
- Position: Attacking midfielder

Youth career
- San Roque
- 2011: Goyu-Ryu
- 2011–2012: Espanyol

Senior career*
Years	Team	Apps	(Gls)
2012–2013	Cacereño B	30	(5)
2012–2013	Cacereño	3	(0)
2013–2014	San Roque	28	(8)
2014	Europa	5	(2)
2014–2016	San Roque	50	(27)
2016–2018	Linense	81	(24)
2018–2021	Mallorca	20	(3)
2019–2020	→ Alcorcón (loan)	40	(16)
2020–2021	→ Sabadell (loan)	37	(11)
2021–2024	Eibar	121	(46)
2024–2025	Alavés	16	(0)
2025–2026	Granada	8	(1)
2025–2026	→ Deportivo La Coruña (loan)	34	(5)
2026–	Johor Darul Ta'zim	0	(0)
- * Club domestic league appearances and goals as of 1 August 2026

Juan Diego Molina Martínez (born 5 November 1993), commonly known as Stoichkov, is a Spanish professional footballer who plays for Malaysia Super League club Johor Darul Ta'zim. Mainly an attacking midfielder, he can also play as a winger or a forward.

He made over 170 Segunda División appearances and scored over 60 goals for Mallorca, Alcorcón, Sabadell and Eibar, having played at lower levels until nearly aged 25.

== Career ==
=== Early career ===
Born in San Roque, Cádiz, Andalusia, Stoichkov received his nickname after FC Barcelona's 1990s forward Hristo Stoichkov. His father, who met the Bulgarian international while working at a bar in Barcelona, wanted to legally name his son Stoichkov; this decision was vetoed by his mother.

Stoichkov finished his formation with RCD Espanyol, also in the Catalan capital. On 20 July 2012, he joined Segunda División B side CP Cacereño, but spent the vast majority of his spell with the reserves.

On 5 September 2013, Stoichkov signed for Tercera División side CD San Roque, club he already represented as a youth. Ahead of the 2014–15 campaign, he moved abroad for the first time in his career and joined Gibraltarian side Europa FC, playing in the UEFA Europa League qualifying stages before rejoining San Roque in December 2014.

On 28 January 2016, Stoichkov moved to Real Balompédica Linense in the third level. He immediately became a starter for the side, and scored ten goals for them in the 2017–18 campaign.

=== Mallorca ===
On 6 July 2018, Stoichkov signed a four-year contract with RCD Mallorca, newly promoted to Segunda División. He made his professional debut on 7 September, coming on as a second-half substitute for Carlos Castro in a 1–0 home win against Cádiz CF.

Stoichkov scored his first professional goal on 27 October 2018, netting the equaliser in a 2–2 home draw against UD Las Palmas. He contributed with three league goals during the campaign as his side achieved promotion to La Liga.

On 20 July 2019, Stoichkov joined AD Alcorcón in the second division on a one-year loan deal. In his year with the team from the Community of Madrid, he finished joint fourth in the league's top scorers with 16 goals.

On 5 October 2020, Stoichkov joined CE Sabadell FC on loan for the 2020–21 campaign. He scored 11 goals, including both of a 2–2 home draw with neighbours Girona FC, but the Catalans were relegated.

=== Eibar ===
On 21 July 2021, Stoichkov moved to fellow second division side SD Eibar on a three-year deal. He opened his account with two goals in a 3–2 win at Basque neighbours Real Sociedad B on 11 September, adding a further brace to win at home to Sporting de Gijón by the same score eight days later. He was October's Segunda División Player of the Month for three goals in five games.

Stoichkov was sent off for the first time in his career on 6 March 2022, at the end of a 4–1 loss at FC Cartagena in which he opened the scoring. His suspension was overturned on appeal when the Royal Spanish Football Federation ruled that he did not deny his opponent a clear goalscoring chance. He finished the campaign with 21 goals, behind joint top scorers Borja Bastón and Cristhian Stuani, while his team made the play-offs in third.

On 19 December 2023, Stoichkov renewed with the Armeros until 2026.

=== Alavés ===
On 17 July 2024, Stoichkov was announced at top tier side Deportivo Alavés on a three-year deal, after the club paid his € 1 million release clause. He made his debut in the category at the age of 31 on 16 August, playing the last 22 minutes in a 2–1 away loss to RC Celta de Vigo.

=== Granada ===
On 25 January 2025, Stoichkov returned to the second division after signing a two-and-a-half-year contract with Granada CF. On 29 August, Deportivo de La Coruña announced that they had signed Stoichkov on a season-long loan deal, with Mohamed Bouldini moving in the opposite direction also on loan.

On 31 July 2026, Stoichkov terminated his link with the Nazaríes.

=== Johor Darul Ta'zim ===
On 1 August 2026, Stoichkov was announced as the latest signing for the Malaysia Super League club Johor Darul Ta'zim, marking his first career move outside of Europe.

== Career statistics ==
As of match played 31 May 2026

Appearances and goals by club, season and competition
Club	Season	League			National cup (Note: Includes Copa Del Rey)		Continental		Other		Total	
Club	Season	Division	Apps	Goals	Apps	Goals	Apps	Goals	Apps	Goals	Apps	Goals
Cacereño	2012–13	Segunda División B	3	0	—		—		—		3	0
San Roque	2013–14	Tercera División	28	8	—		—		—		28	8
San Roque	2014–15	Tercera División	26	11	—		—		—		26	11
San Roque	Total		54	19	0	0	0	0	0	0	54	19
Europa	2014–15	Gibraltar Premier Division	5	2	—		2 (Note: Appearances in UEFA Europa League)	0	—		7	2
San Roque	2015–16	Tercera División	24	16	—		—		—		24	16
Linense	2015–16	Segunda División B	15	5	—		—		—		15	5
Linense	2016–17	Segunda División B	30	9	—		—		—		30	9
Linense	2017–18	Segunda División B	36	10	—		—		—		36	10
Linense	Total		81	24	0	0	0	0	0	0	81	24
Mallorca	2018–19	Segunda División	16	3	3	0	—		1 (Note: Appearance(s) in Promotion Playoffs)	0	20	3
Mallorca	2020–21	Segunda División	3	0	0	0	—		0	0	3	0
Mallorca	Total		19	3	3	0	0	0	1	0	23	3
Alcorcón (loan)	2019–20	Segunda División	40	16	0	0	—		—		40	16
Sabadell (loan)	2020–21	Segunda División	37	11	1	1	—		—		38	12
Eibar	2021–22	Segunda División	39	21	1	0	—		1	0	41	21
Eibar	2022–23	Segunda División	40	12	1	0	—		2	1	43	13
Eibar	2023–24	Segunda División	39	12	1	0	—		2 (Note: pro)	0	42	12
Eibar	Total		118	45	3	0	0	0	5	1	126	46
Alavés	2024–25	La Liga	16	0	1	0	—		—		17	0
Granada	2024–25	Segunda División	14	1	—		—		—		14	1
Granada	2025–26	Segunda División	2	0	0	0	—		—		2	0
Granada	Total		16	1	0	0	0	0	0	0	16	1
Deportivo La Coruña (loan)	2025–26	Segunda División	34	5	0	0	—		—		34	5
Johor Darul Ta'zim	2026–27	Malaysia Super League	0	0	0	0	0	0	0	0	0	0
Career total			447	142	8	1	2	0	6	1	463	144

== Honours ==
Individual

- Zarra Trophy: 2019–20
- Segunda División Player of the Month: October 2021, January 2023
