= Ximo Miralles =

Spanish footballer

Personal information
- Full name: Joaquín Miralles Sanz
- Date of birth: 14 April 1996 (age 30)
- Place of birth: Vinaròs, Spain
- Height: 1.78 m (5 ft 10 in)
- Position: Goalkeeper

Youth career
- 2005–2015: Villarreal

College career
| Years | Team | Apps | (Gls) |
| 2016–2017 | Clemson Tigers | 40 | (0) |

Senior career*
| Years | Team | Apps | (Gls) |
| 2015–2016 | Villarreal C | 22 | (0) |
| 2017 | Fresno Fuego | 0 | (0) |
| 2017 | Lane United | 9 | (0) |
| 2018 | Villarreal C | 7 | (0) |
| 2018–2020 | Alcorcón B | 37 | (0) |
| 2019–2020 | Alcorcón | 6 | (0) |
| 2020–2021 | Numancia | 23 | (0) |
| 2021–2022 | Logroñés | 6 | (0) |
| Total | | 110 | (0) |
- * Club domestic league appearances and goals

Joaquín "Ximo" Miralles Sanz (born 14 April 1996) is a Spanish musician and former footballer who played as a goalkeeper.

== Career ==
Born in Vinaròs, Valencian Community, Miralles joined Villarreal CF's youth setup in 2005. In 2015, he became Spanish National Champion with Villarreal CF Juvenil A winning the ¨Copa de Campeones¨ and captaining a unique generation of current professional players such as Rodrigo Hernandez from Manchester City. He made his senior debut with the C-team on 5 September 2015, starting in a 0–0 Tercera División home draw against Muro CF.

On 3 July 2016, after being a regular starter, Miralles moved abroad after signing a full scholarship deal with Clemson University, joining their soccer side Clemson Tigers. At Clemson, Miralles finished his first season as #1 seed in the RPI rankings and making it to the ACC Final and NCAA National Tournament Quarter Finals, falling against Denver University. On 24 April of the following year, he signed for Premier Development League side Fresno Fuego FC, but after two weeks he moved to Lane United FC where he played nine matches.

In January 2018, after finishing his degree in economics and ending his second season for the Clemson Tigers, Miralles returned to Villarreal and its C-side. On 12 July of that year, he signed a one-year contract with AD Alcorcón in Segunda División, being initially assigned to the reserves also in the fourth division.

On 16 November 2019, as both Dani Jiménez and Samu Casado were injured, Miralles made his professional debut by starting in a 1–0 home defeat of Málaga CF. The following 2 September, he agreed to a two-year deal with CD Numancia in the third division.

On 26 July 2021, Miralles signed for Primera División RFEF side UD Logroñés. In August 2022, after spending the season as a backup to Jon Ander Serantes, he retired to dedicate himself to his music group named Dorsal 31.
