= Miguel Cuesta =

- Born: Miguel Ángel Cuesta; 16 March 1991 (age 35)
- Origin: Madrid, Spain
- Genres: Pop; pop rock
- Years active: 2012–present
- Label: Dirty Chords
- Website: Official website

Miguel Ángel Cuesta (born 16 March 1991), known professionally as Miguel Cuesta, is a Spanish pop-rock singer. In early 2014 he published his first studio album, Quality Pop.

== Discography ==
=== Albums ===
- Quality Pop (2014)

=== Singles ===
- Qué Más Da (2012)
- Everybody Is Jumping (2014)

=== Videoclips ===
- Everybody Is Jumping (2014)
- No Aprenderé (ft. Miriam Rupy) (2014)
- Siempre (2015)
