= Jorge Alvarez =

Jorge Alvarez may refer to:

- Jorge Álvarez Máynez (born 1985), Mexican politician
- Jorge Álvarez (rower) (born 1959), Cuban Olympic rower
- Jorge Álvarez (sport shooter) (born 1989), Cuban sport shooter
- Jorge Montt Álvarez (1845–1922), vice-admiral of the Chilean navy and president of Chile from 1891 to 1896
- Jorge Álvares (died 1521), Portuguese explorer
- Jorge Álvarez (producer) (1932–2015), Argentine music producer
- Jorge Álvarez (Chilean footballer) (born 1990), Chilean footballer
- Jorge Álvarez (Honduran footballer) (born 1998), Honduran footballer
