= Gabriel Palmero =

Spanish professional footballer

Personal information
- Full name: Gabriel Felipe Arrocha
- Date of birth: 15 January 2002 (age 24)
- Place of birth: La Palma, Spain
- Height: 1.81 m (5 ft 11 in)
- Position: Left-back

Youth career
- –2017: Tenisca
- 2017–2021: Las Palmas
- 2020: → Tenisca (loan)

Senior career*
Years	Team	Apps	(Gls)
2017	Tenisca	1	(0)
2020–2023	Las Palmas C	55	(7)
2020	→ Tenisca (loan)	2	(0)
2022–2024	Las Palmas B	33	(0)
2023–2025	Las Palmas	0	(0)
2024–2025	→ Gimnástica Segoviana (loan)	13	(0)
2025	→ Tenerife B (loan)	14	(1)
2025	→ Tenerife (loan)	1	(0)
2025	Tenerife	0	(0)
2025	→ Unionistas (loan)	1	(0)
2026	Kuching City	2	(0)

International career^{‡}
2025	Malaysia	4	(0)
- * Club domestic league appearances and goals as of 1 March 2026 ‡ National team caps and goals as of 10 September 2025

Gabriel Felipe Arrocha (born 15 January 2002), commonly known as Gabriel Palmero, is a Spanish professional footballer who last played as a left-back. He played for the Malaysia national team on four occasions. However, he waa suspended from all football-related activities for a year after being sanctioned by FIFA in September 2025 for forging documents claiming his grandmother was born in Malaysia.

== Club career ==
=== Las Palmas ===
Born in La Palma, Santa Cruz de Tenerife, Canary Islands (which led to his nickname Palmero), he was a youth product of Tenisca, making him a senior debut with the main squad at the age of 15 on 12 April 2017, in a 2–1 Tercera División home loss to Estrella. He later joined the youth categories of Las Palmas shortly after, and signed a contract renewal on 16 October 2018.

Palmero became a full member of the reserves ahead of the 2023–24 campaign, now also in the fifth division. He made his first team debut on 31 October 2023, coming on as a late substitute for goalscorer Julián Araujo in a 3–0 away win over Manacor, for the season's Copa del Rey.

==== Tenisca (loan) ====
Palmero returned to Tenisca on loan on 31 January 2020; initially a member of their Juvenil squad, he also featured in two matches with the main squad. Back to the Amarillos in July, he played for the Juvenil squad before being promoted to the C-team in Tercera División RFEF in the following year.

==== Gimnástica Segoviana (loan) ====
On 4 August 2024, Palmero was loaned to Primera Federación side Gimnástica Segoviana, for one year.

=== Tenerife ===
The following 3 January 2025, his loan was cut short, and he moved to the rivals Tenerife also in a temporary deal; he was initially assigned to the B-team in Segunda Federación.

Palmero made his professional debut with Tenerife on 17 May 2025, starting in a 1–0 away loss to Cartagena, as both sides were already relegated. He signed a permanent deal with the club afterwards.

==== Unionistas (loan) ====
On 14 July 2025, Palmero was loaned to fellow third division side Unionistas de Salamanca CF for one year. Palmero was later suspended by the club after being sanctioned by FIFA in September. Later on 7 November 2025, the loan with Unionistas was terminated, then his contract with Tenerife was also terminated.

== International career ==
In March 2025, Palmero was called up to the Malaysia national team, claiming his grandmother was born in the country. He joined the national training camp later that month in Johor Bahru alongside Hector Hevel, another player who claimed Malaysian heritage, as part of preparation for the third round of the 2027 AFC Asian Cup qualification.

Palmero made his international debut for Malaysia on 29 May 2025 in an international friendly against Cape Verde, which ended in a 1–1 draw. He started the match and played 78 minutes.

In September 2025, Football Association of Malaysia (FAM), Palmero, and six other players with claimed Malaysian heritage were sanctioned by FIFA due to falsification and forgery of documents regarding the seven players' eligibility to play in the third round of the 2027 AFC Asian Cup qualifiers against Vietnam. Each player was fined CHF 2,000 (around MYR 10,560) and were suspended from all football related activities for 12 months. FAM has confirmed it will file an appeal against FIFA's sanctions. The appeal was however rejected by FIFA.

== Career statistics ==
=== International ===
As of match played 8 September 2025

Appearances and goals by national team and year
National team	Year	Apps	Goals
Malaysia	2025	4	0
Total		4	0
