= Mario Losada (footballer) =

Spanish footballer

Personal information
- Full name: Mario Losada Laguna
- Date of birth: 13 May 1997 (age 29)
- Place of birth: Madrid, Spain
- Height: 1.75 m (5 ft 9 in)
- Position: Forward

Team information
- Current team: Zamora
- Number: 9

Youth career
- Rayo Vallecano

Senior career*
Years	Team	Apps	(Gls)
2016–2018	Trival Valderas	69	(17)
2018–2019	Alcorcón B	37	(12)
2019	Alcorcón	2	(0)
2019–2020	Deportivo B	24	(11)
2020–2021	Las Rozas	23	(6)
2021–2022	Zamora	34	(2)
2022–2024	Unionistas	65	(11)
2024–2025	Alcoyano	35	(10)
2025–2026	Stal Mielec	19	(4)
2026–	Zamora	18	(6)
- * Club domestic league appearances and goals as of 25 May 2026

Mario Losada Laguna (born 13 May 1997) is a Spanish professional footballer who plays as a forward for Primera Federación club Zamora.

== Club career ==
Losada was born in Madrid, and finished his formation with Rayo Vallecano. On 16 August 2016, he joined Tercera División side CF Trival Valderas, and made his senior debut for the club twelve days later by coming on as a substitute and scoring the equalizer in a 1–1 home draw against Alcobendas CF.

On 18 February 2018, Losada scored a hat-trick in a 5–1 away routing of CP Parla Escuela. On 15 July, after finishing the campaign with 14 goals, he joined AD Alcorcón and was initially assigned to the reserves also in the fourth tier.

Losada made his first team debut on 1 June 2019, replacing Borja Galán in a 0–1 home loss against Gimnàstic de Tarragona in the Segunda División championship.
