= Samu Casado =

Spanish footballer (born 1997)

Personal information
- Full name: Samuel Casado Conde
- Date of birth: 16 January 1997 (age 29)
- Place of birth: Guadix, Spain
- Height: 1.87 m (6 ft 2 in)
- Position: Goalkeeper

Team information
- Current team: Algeciras
- Number: 13

Youth career
- Guadix
- Almería
- 2010–2011: La Cañada
- 2011–2016: Málaga

Senior career*
Years	Team	Apps	(Gls)
2016–2019	Málaga B	48	(0)
2019–2021	Alcorcón	3	(0)
2021–2022	Valladolid B	18	(0)
2022–2024	Linares	49	(0)
2024–2025	Intercity	33	(0)
2025–	Algeciras	3	(0)
- * Club domestic league appearances and goals as of 10 June 2026

Samuel "Samu" Casado Conde (born 16 January 1997) is a Spanish footballer who plays as a goalkeeper for Primera Federación club Algeciras.

== Club career ==
Born in Guadix, Granada, Andalusia, Casado joined Málaga CF's youth setup in June 2011, after representing UCD La Cañada Atlético, UD Almería and Guadix CF. He made his senior debut with the reserves on 13 March 2016, starting in a 3–0 Tercera División away defeat of Vélez CF.

Casado spent his first two seasons as a backup to Aarón Escandell, and renewed his contract until 2021 on 30 March 2017. He subsequently shared the first-choice status with Kellyan, and achieved promotion to Segunda División B in 2018.

On 28 August 2019, Casado signed a three-year deal with Segunda División side AD Alcorcón. He made his professional debut on 9 November, coming on as a second-half substitute for injured Dani Jiménez in a 1–1 away draw against UD Las Palmas.

On 17 July 2021, Casado agreed to a one-year contract with Real Valladolid Promesas, after cutting ties with Alkor.

On 18 June 2024, Casado signed with Intercity in the third tier.
