= 2018–19 Sevilla FC season =

112th season in existence of Sevilla FC

Sevilla FC
2018–19 season
- President: José Castro Carmona
- Head coach: Pablo Machín (until 15 March); Joaquín Caparrós (caretaker, from 15 March)
- Stadium: Ramón Sánchez Pizjuán
- La Liga: 6th
- Copa del Rey: Quarter-finals
- Supercopa de España: Runners-up
- UEFA Europa League: Round of 16
- Top goalscorer: League: Wissam Ben Yedder (18); All: Wissam Ben Yedder (30)
Home colours	Away colours	Third colours

The 2018–19 season was the 112th season in existence of Sevilla FC and the club's 18th consecutive season in La Liga, the top league of Spanish football. Sevilla competed in La Liga, the Supercopa de España, the Copa del Rey and the UEFA Europa League.

== Kit ==
On 21 May 2018, Sevilla announced a new three-year kit supply contract with American sportswear giant Nike from 2018–2021.

== Players ==
=== First-team squad ===
As of 29 January 2019

Note: Flags indicate national team as defined under FIFA eligibility rules; some limited exceptions apply. Players may hold more than one non-FIFA nationality.

No.	Pos.	Nation	Player
1	GK	CZE	Tomáš Vaclík
3	DF	ESP	Sergi Gómez
4	DF	DEN	Simon Kjær
5	MF	FRA	Ibrahim Amadou
6	DF	POR	Daniel Carriço (vice-captain)
7	MF	ESP	Roque Mesa
8	FW	ESP	Nolito
9	FW	FRA	Wissam Ben Yedder
10	MF	ARG	Éver Banega (5th captain)
11	MF	ESP	Aleix Vidal
12	FW	POR	André Silva (on loan from Milan)
13	GK	ESP	Juan Soriano

No.	Pos.	Nation	Player
14	DF	AUT	Maximilian Wöber (on loan from Ajax)
15	MF	FRA	Maxime Gonalons (on loan from Roma)
16	MF	ESP	Jesús Navas (captain)
17	MF	ESP	Pablo Sarabia
18	DF	ESP	Sergio Escudero (3rd captain)
19	FW	ESP	Munir El Haddadi
21	MF	NED	Quincy Promes
22	MF	ARG	Franco Vázquez
23	DF	BRA	Guilherme Arana
24	DF	FRA	Joris Gnagnon
25	DF	ARG	Gabriel Mercado (4th captain)

==== From youth squad ====
Note: Flags indicate national team as defined under FIFA eligibility rules; some limited exceptions apply. Players may hold more than one non-FIFA nationality.

No.	Pos.	Nation	Player
26	MF	ESP	Pejiño
29	MF	ESP	José Mena
37	DF	ESP	Juan Berrocal González
40	DF	ESP	Javi Vázquez
41	FW	ESP	Bryan Gil

=== Players in ===
No.	Pos.	Nat.	Name	Age	EU	Moving from	Type	Transfer window	Ends	Transfer fee	Source
1	GK	(Czech Republic)	Tomáš Vaclík	29	EU	(Switzerland) Basel	Transfer	Summer	2021	€2M	Sevilla FC
3	DF	(Spain)	Sergi Gómez	26	EU	Celta Vigo	Transfer	Summer	2022	€5.4M	Sevilla FC
5	MF	(France)	Ibrahim Amadou	25	EU	(France) Lille	Transfer	Summer	2022	€14.4M	Sevilla FC
7	MF	(Spain)	Roque Mesa	29	EU	(England) Swansea City	Transfer	Summer	2021	€6M	Sevilla FC
11	MF	(Spain)	Aleix Vidal	28	EU	Barcelona	Transfer	Summer	2022	€9.3M	Sevilla FC
12	FW	(Portugal)	André Silva	22	EU	(Italy) Milan	Loan	Summer	2019	€4M	Sevilla FC
15	MF	(France)	Maxime Gonalons	29	EU	(Italy) Roma	Loan	Summer	2019	Free	Sevilla FC
21	MF	(Netherlands)	Quincy Promes	26	EU	(Russia) Spartak Moscow	Transfer	Summer	2023	€20M	Sevilla FC
23	MF	(Spain)	Borja Lasso	24	EU	Osasuna	Loan Return	Summer	2019	Free	
24	DF	(France)	Joris Gnagnon	21	EU	(France) Rennes	Transfer	Summer	2023	€13.5M	Sevilla FC
19	FW	(Spain)	Munir El Haddadi	23	EU	Barcelona	Transfer	Winter	2023	€1.05M	Sevilla FC
14	DF	(Austria)	Maximilian Wöber	20	EU	(Netherlands) Ajax	Loan	Winter	2019	Free	Sevilla FC
20	MF	(Croatia)	Marko Rog	23	EU	(Italy) Napoli	Loan	Winter	2019	€0.5M	Sevilla FC

Total spending: ▼€76.15M

=== Players out ===
No.	Pos.	Nat.	Name	Age	EU	Moving to	Type	Transfer window	Transfer fee	Source
1	GK	(Spain)	Sergio Rico	24	EU	(England) Fulham	Loan	Summer	Free	Fulham FC
2	DF	(France)	Sébastien Corchia	27	EU	(Portugal) Benfica	Loan	Summer	€0.7M	SL Benfica
5	DF	(France)	Clément Lenglet	23	EU	Barcelona	Transfer	Summer	€35.9M	FC Barcelona
11	MF	(Argentina)	Joaquín Correa	23	EU	(Italy) Lazio	Transfer	Summer	€15M	Sevilla FC
13	GK	(Spain)	David Soria	25	EU	Getafe	Transfer	Summer	€2.8M	Getafe CF
14	MF	(Argentina)	Guido Pizarro	28	Non-EU	(Mexico) Tigres UANL	Transfer	Summer	€8.4M	Tigres UANL
15	MF	(France)	Steven Nzonzi	29	EU	(Italy) Roma	Transfer	Summer	€26M	A.S. Roma
19	MF	(Brazil)	Ganso	28	Non-EU	(France) Amiens	Loan	Summer	Free	Amiens
21	DF	(Argentina)	Nicolás Pareja	34	EU	(Mexico) Atlas	Transfer	Summer	Free	Atlas
–	FW	(Spain)	Juan Muñoz	22	EU	Alcorcón	Transfer	Summer	Free	Sevilla FC
14	FW	(Colombia)	Luis Muriel	27	Non-EU	(Italy) Fiorentina	Loan	Winter	€1M	Sevilla FC
20	MF	(Spain)	Borja Lasso	25	EU	Tenerife	Transfer	Winter	Free	CD Tenerife

Total income: ▲€89.8M

Net: ▲€13.65M

== Pre-season and friendlies ==
=== Summer ===
Win Draw Loss Cancelled

14 July 2018	Sevilla	1–1	Bournemouth	Murcia, Spain
20:00 CEST (UTC+2)	Ben Yedder 23'	Report	Ibe 68'	Stadium: La Manga Stadium; Referee: Santiago Jaime Latre (Spain)

17 July 2018	Murcia	0–2	Sevilla	Alicante, Spain
20:00 CEST (UTC+2)		Report	Ben Yedder 7'; Gual 63'	Stadium: Real Club de Golf Campoamor; Referee: José María Sánchez Martínez (Spain)

21 July 2018	Sevilla	0–1	Benfica	Zürich, Switzerland
18:00 CEST (UTC+2)	Arana (yellow card) 60'; Mesa (yellow card) 73'	Report	Castillo 56'; Dias (yellow card) 73'	Stadium: Stadion Letzigrund; Attendance: 4,400; Referee: Lukas Fähndrich (Switzerland)

4 August 2018	Sevilla	2–1	Extremadura	Seville, Spain
21:00 CEST (UTC+2)	Nolito 47'; Sarabia 81'	Report	Manchón 62'	Stadium: Ramón Sánchez Pizjuán

=== Winter ===
22 March 2019 A. Puerta Trophy	Sevilla	2–0	Schalke 04	Seville, Spain
20:45 CET (UTC+1)	Mesa 35'; Munir 72' (pen.)	Report		Stadium: Ramón Sánchez Pizjuán; Attendance: 25,000; Referee: Mario Melero López (Spain)

=== Spring ===
23 May 2019 SportPesa Challenge Cup	Simba SC	4–5	Sevilla	Dar es Salaam, Tanzania
17:00 CEST (UTC+2)	Bocco 9', 32'; Kagere 16'; Okwi (yellow card) 39'; Chama 62'; Mlipili (yellow card) 67'	Report	Escudero 24'; Nolito 50', 90+4'; Promes 85', 90'; Arana (yellow card) 90+5'	Stadium: National Stadium; Referee: Elly Sasii (Tanzania)

== Competitions ==
=== Overall ===
Competition	First match	Last match	Starting round	Final position	Record							
Competition	First match	Last match	Starting round	Final position	Pld	W	D	L	GF	GA	GD	Win %
La Liga	19 August 2018	19 May 2019	Matchday 1	6th	38	17	8	13	62	47	+15	44.74
Copa del Rey	1 November 2018	30 January 2019	Round of 32	Quarter-finals	6	3	1	2	7	8	−1	50.00
Supercopa de España	12 August 2018		Final	Runners-up	1	0	0	1	1	2	−1	0.00
Europa League	26 July 2018	14 March 2019	Second qualifying round	Round of 16	16	12	1	3	43	13	+30	75.00
Total					61	32	10	19	113	70	+43	52.46

Last updated: 18 May 2019
Source: Competitions

=== La Liga ===
On 24 July 2018, the La Liga fixtures for the forthcoming season were announced.

==== League table ====
Pos	Team	Pld	W	D	L	GF	GA	GD	Pts	Qualification or relegation
4	Valencia	38	15	16	7	51	35	+16	61	Qualification for the Champions League group stage
5	Getafe	38	15	14	9	48	35	+13	59 (Note: Getafe finished ahead of Sevilla on head-to-head points: Sevilla 0–2 Getafe, Getafe 3–0 Sevilla.)	Qualification for the Europa League group stage (Note: Since the winners of the 2018–19 Copa del Rey, Valencia, qualified for European competition based on league position, the spot awarded to the cup winners (Europa League group stage) was passed to the sixth-placed team and the spot awarded to the sixth-placed team (Europa League second qualifying round) was passed to the seventh-placed team.)
6	Sevilla	38	17	8	13	62	47	+15	59	Qualification for the Europa League group stage
7	Espanyol	38	14	11	13	48	50	−2	53 (Note: Espanyol finished ahead of Athletic Bilbao on head-to-head points: Espanyol 1–0 Athletic Bilbao, Athletic Bilbao 1–1 Espanyol.)	Qualification for the Europa League second qualifying round
8	Athletic Bilbao	38	13	14	11	41	45	−4	53	

Source: La Liga, Soccerway
Rules for classification: 1) Points; 2) Head-to-head points; 3) Head-to-head goal difference; 4) Goal difference; 5) Goals scored; 6) Fair-play points (Note: Head-to-head record is used only after all the matches between the teams in question have been played)

==== Results summary ====
Overall								Home						Away					
Pld	W	D	L	GF	GA	GD	Pts	W	D	L	GF	GA	GD	W	D	L	GF	GA	GD
38	17	8	13	62	47	+15	59	12	3	4	39	20	+19	5	5	9	23	27	−4

Last updated: 18 May 2019.
Source: Competitive matches

==== Results by round ====
Round	1	2	3	4	5	6	7	8	9	10	11	12	13	14	15	16	17	18	19	20	21	22	23	24	25	26	27	28	29	30	31	32	33	34	35	36	37	38
Ground	A	H	A	H	A	H	A	H	A	H	A	H	H	A	A	H	A	H	A	A	H	A	H	A	H	A	H	A	H	H	A	H	A	H	A	H	A	H
Result	W	D	L	L	W	W	W	W	L	W	D	W	W	D	D	W	D	D	L	L	W	L	D	L	L	L	W	W	L	W	W	W	L	W	L	L	D	W
Position	1	3	5	12	7	5	3	1	4	3	3	2	1	2	2	2	3	3	3	4	4	4	4	4	5	6	6	6	7	6	5	4	6	5	5	6	6	6

Updated to match(es) played on 18 May 2019. Source: Competitive matches
A = Away; H = Home; W = Win; D = Draw; L = Loss

==== Matches ====
Win Draw Loss Fixtures

19 August 2018 1	Rayo Vallecano	1–4	Sevilla	Madrid
20:15 CEST (UTC+02:00)	Pozo (yellow card) 12'; Embarda 85' (pen.)	Report	Vázquez 15'; Silva 31', 45', 79'	Stadium: Campo de Fútbol de Vallecas; Attendance: 11,482; Referee: Antonio Mateu Lahoz

26 August 2018 2	Sevilla	0–0	Villarreal	Seville
22:15 CEST (UTC+02:00)	Mercado (yellow card) 44'; Sarabia (yellow card) 81'; Kjær (yellow card) 90+2'	Report	Mario Gaspar (yellow card) 5'; Costa (yellow card) 88'	Stadium: Ramón Sánchez Pizjuán; Attendance: 35,831; Referee: Alberto Undiano Mallenco

2 September 2018 3	Real Betis	1–0	Sevilla	Seville
20:45 CEST (UTC+02:00)	Carvalho (yellow card) 30'; Canales (yellow card) 64'; Joaquín 80', (yellow card) 81'	Report	Mercado (yellow card) 42'; Silva (yellow card) 45'; Mesa (yellow card) 45' (yellow-red card) 66'; Kjær (yellow card) 71'; Sarabia (yellow card) 81'	Stadium: Benito Villamarín; Attendance: 53,451; Referee: Jesús Gil Manzano
Note: Mesa was given a second yellow card ( (yellow card) 66') which was later rescinded by the Royal Spanish Football Federation.

16 September 2018 4	Sevilla	0–2	Getafe	Seville
20:45 CEST (UTC+02:00)	Mesa (yellow card) 14'; Navas (yellow card) 21'; Banega (yellow card) 69'	Report	Ángel 3', 38'; Cabrera (yellow card) 16'; Djené (yellow card) 19'; Antunes (yellow card) 21'; Amath (yellow card) 45'; Bruno (yellow card) 70'; Foulquier (yellow card) 76'	Stadium: Ramón Sánchez Pizjuán; Attendance: 36,943; Referee: Ricardo de Burgos Bengoetxea

23 September 2018 5	Levante	2–6	Sevilla	Valencia
12:00 CEST (UTC+02:00)	Postigo (yellow card) 20'; Roger 12'; Simon 90'	Report	Ben Yedder 11', 35', 45'; Carriço 21'; Silva 49'; Sarabia 59'; Vidal (yellow card) 62'	Stadium: Ciutat de València; Attendance: 21,520; Referee: Guillermo Cuadra Fernández

26 September 2018 6	Sevilla	3–0	Real Madrid	Seville
22:00 CEST (UTC+02:00)	Silva 17', 21'; Vázquez (yellow card) 34'; Ben Yedder 39'; Banega (yellow card) 74'; Sarabia (yellow card) 79'	Report	Bale (yellow card) 27'; Kroos (yellow card) 64'; Modrić (yellow card) 65'; Mariano (yellow card) 87'	Stadium: Ramón Sánchez Pizjuán; Attendance: 40,972; Referee: Alejandro Hernández Hernández

29 September 2018 7	Eibar	1–3	Sevilla	Eibar
18:30 CEST (UTC+02:00)	Ramis (yellow card) 17'; Orellana (yellow card) 56'; Jordán 90+9'	Report	Silva 47'; Banega 59' (pen.), 90+4', (yellow card) 80'; Vázquez (yellow card) 89'; Arana (yellow card) 90+7'	Stadium: Ipurua Municipal Stadium; Attendance: 5,443; Referee: Xavier Estrada Fernández

7 October 2018 8	Sevilla	2–1	Celta Vigo	Seville
18:30 CEST (UTC+02:00)	Banega (yellow card) 17'; Sarabia 39'; Carriço (yellow card) 56'; Ben Yedder 61'; Arana (yellow card) 89'	Report	Roncaglia (yellow card) 17'; Araujo (yellow card) 56' (yellow-red card) 58'; Boufal 85'; Cabral (yellow card) 90+2'	Stadium: Ramón Sánchez Pizjuán; Attendance: 38,141; Referee: Pablo González Fuertes

20 October 2018 9	Barcelona	4–2	Sevilla	Barcelona
20:45 CEST (UTC+02:00)	Coutinho 2'; Messi 12'; Suárez 63' (pen.); Rakitić 88'	Report	Vaclík (yellow card) 62'; Lenglet 79' (o.g.); Muriel 90+1'	Stadium: Camp Nou; Attendance: 88,712; Referee: Juan Martínez Munuera

28 October 2018 10	Sevilla	2–1	Huesca	Seville
20:45 CET (UTC+01:00)	Carriço (yellow card) 45'; Arana (yellow card) 61'; Sarabia 65', 78'	Report	Gürler (yellow card) 45'; Miramón (yellow card) 60'; Ávila (yellow card) 90+2'; Pulido 90+3'	Stadium: Ramón Sánchez Pizjuán; Attendance: 33,022; Referee: David Medié Jiménez

4 November 2018 11	Real Sociedad	0–0	Sevilla	San Sebastián
18:30 CET (UTC+01:00)	Hernandez (yellow card) 85'	Report	Navas (yellow card) 73'; Amadou (yellow card) 79'; Mesa (yellow card) 90+2'	Stadium: Anoeta Stadium; Attendance: 24,882; Referee: Eduardo Prieto Iglesias

11 November 2018 12	Sevilla	2–1	Espanyol	Seville
18:30 CET (UTC+01:00)	Vázquez (yellow card) 8'; Carriço (yellow card) 18'; Mercado (yellow card) 61', (goal) 70'; Escudero (yellow card) 88'; Ben Yedder 89'	Report	Iglesias 38'; Granero (yellow card) 54'; López (yellow card) 83'	Stadium: Ramón Sánchez Pizjuán; Attendance: 38,769; Referee: Santiago Jaime Latre

25 November 2018 13	Sevilla	1–0	Valladolid	Seville
16:15 CET (UTC+01:00)	Silva 30'; Escudero (yellow card) 39'; Carriço (yellow card) 64'; Vidal (yellow card) 81'	Report	Antoñito (yellow card) 21'; Fernández (yellow card) 87'; Joaquín (yellow card) 89'	Stadium: Ramón Sánchez Pizjuán; Attendance: 34,064; Referee: Carlos del Cerro Grande

2 December 2018 14	Alavés	1–1	Sevilla	Vitoria-Gasteiz
20:45 CET (UTC+01:00)	García (yellow card) 24'; Jony 37'; Pina (yellow card) 55'; Guidetti (yellow card) 90+3'	Report	Mesa (yellow card) 26'; Sarabia (yellow card) 39'; Ben Yedder 78'; Vázquez (yellow card) 84'	Stadium: Mendizorrotza Stadium; Attendance: 17,848; Referee: José María Sánchez Martínez

9 December 2018 15	Valencia	1–1	Sevilla	Valencia
16:15 CET (UTC+01:00)	Diakhaby 90+2'	Report	Vázquez (yellow card) 36'; Promes (yellow card) 37'; Mercado (yellow card) 45'; Sarabia 55'; Silva (yellow card) 90+1'	Stadium: Mestalla; Attendance: 40,057; Referee: Xavier Estrada Fernández

16 December 2018 16	Sevilla	2–0	Girona	Seville
12:00 CET (UTC+01:00)	Banega 55' (pen.), (yellow card) 85'; Sarabia 64', (yellow card) 89'	Report	Fernández (yellow card) 33'	Stadium: Ramón Sánchez Pizjuán; Attendance: 33,542; Referee: Guillermo Cuadra Fernández

23 December 2018 17	Leganés	1–1	Sevilla	Leganés
16:15 CET (UTC+01:00)	Vesga 5'; Nyom (yellow card) 17'; Pérez (yellow card) 59'; J. Silva (yellow card) 70'	Report	Ben Yedder (yellow card) 44', (goal) 90+1'; Mercado (yellow card) 45'; Vázquez (red card) 45'; A. Silva (yellow card) 67'	Stadium: Estadio Municipal de Butarque; Attendance: 11,321; Referee: Alejandro Hernández Hernández

6 January 2019 18	Sevilla	1–1	Atlético Madrid	Seville
16:15 CET (UTC+01:00)	Ben Yedder 37'; Navas (yellow card) 45'; Sarabia (yellow card) 47'; Banega (yellow card) 72'; Silva (yellow card) 90+2'; Carriço (yellow card) 90+4'	Report	Correa (yellow card) 14'; Griezmann 45', (yellow card) 54'; Saúl (yellow card) 49'; Rodri (yellow card) 77'; Godín (yellow card) 78'; Partey (yellow card) 90+1'; Savić (yellow card) 90+2'	Stadium: Ramón Sánchez Pizjuán; Attendance: 38,603; Referee: Antonio Mateu Lahoz

13 January 2019 19	Athletic Bilbao	2–0	Sevilla	Bilbao
16:15 CET (UTC+01:00)	Williams 23', 84'; García (yellow card) 64'; Muniain (yellow card) 76'; Herrerín (yellow card) 81'; I. Martínez (yellow card) 90'	Report	Mesa (yellow card) 26'; Escudero (yellow card) 28'; Gnagnon (yellow card) 90+3'	Stadium: San Mamés; Attendance: 41,342; Referee: Pablo González Fuertes

19 January 2019 20	Real Madrid	2–0	Sevilla	Madrid
16:15 CET (UTC+01:00)	Casemiro (yellow card) 61', (goal) 78'; Ceballos (yellow card) 65'; Modrić 90+2'	Report	Carriço (yellow card) 30'; Banega (yellow card) 54'; Kjær (yellow card) 85'	Stadium: Santiago Bernabéu; Attendance: 68,232; Referee: Antonio Mateu Lahoz

26 January 2019 21	Sevilla	5–0	Levante	Seville
13:00 CET (UTC+01:00)	Mercado (yellow card) 40'; Ben Yedder 48'; Banega (yellow card) 56'; Silva 60'; Vázquez 71'; Sarabia 80' (pen.); Promes 90'	Report	Róber (yellow card) 86'	Stadium: Ramón Sánchez Pizjuán; Attendance: 34,220; Referee: Javier Alberola Rojas

2 February 2019 22	Celta Vigo	1–0	Sevilla	Vigo
20:45 CET (UTC+01:00)	Yokuşlu (yellow card) 49', (goal) 73'; Beltrán (yellow card) 80'; Costas (yellow card) 88'; Méndez (yellow card) 90'	Report	Sarabia (yellow card) 29'; Gómez (yellow card) 63'; Ben Yedder (yellow card) 88'; Banega (yellow card) 89'	Stadium: Balaídos; Attendance: 17,503; Referee: Ricardo de Burgos Bengoetxea

10 February 2019 23	Sevilla	2–2	Eibar	Seville
18:30 CET (UTC+01:00)	Escudero (yellow card) 39'; Banega (yellow card) 65' (yellow-red card) 84'; Ben Yedder 88', (yellow card) 88'; Navas (yellow card) 88'; Sarabia 90+2'	Report	Orellana 22'; Jordán (yellow card) 52'; Charles 63'	Stadium: Ramón Sánchez Pizjuán; Attendance: 36,343; Referee: Ignacio Iglesias Villanueva

17 February 2019 24	Villarreal	3–0	Sevilla	Villarreal
18:30 CET (UTC+01:00)	Toko Ekambi (yellow card) 12', (goal) 45'; Álvaro 20', (yellow card) 52'; Mario Gaspar (yellow card) 68'; Funes Mori (yellow card) 81'; Pedraza 86'	Report	Mesa (yellow card) 60'	Stadium: Estadio de la Cerámica; Attendance: 17,402; Referee: José Luis González González

23 February 2019 25	Sevilla	2–4	Barcelona	Seville
16:15 CET (UTC+01:00)	Navas 22'; Mercado 42'; Rog (yellow card) 49'; Wöber (yellow card) 57'; Vázquez (yellow card) 70'; Kjær (yellow card) 80'; Sarabia (yellow card) 83'; Mesa (yellow card) 90'	Report	Messi 26', 67', 85'; Piqué (yellow card) 38'; Suárez 90+3'	Stadium: Ramón Sánchez Pizjuán; Attendance: 40,661; Referee: Antonio Mateu Lahoz

2 March 2019 26	Huesca	2–1	Sevilla	Huesca
18:30 CET (UTC+01:00)	Juanpi 7'; Etxeita (yellow card) 61'; Galán (yellow card) 66'; Herrera (yellow card) 77'; Pulido (yellow card) 78'; Ávila 90+8', (yellow card) 90+9'	Report	Rog (yellow card) 40'; Promes (yellow card) 45'; Kjær (yellow card) 54'; Ben Yedder 84' (pen.); Mercado (yellow card) 90+8'	Stadium: Estadio El Alcoraz; Attendance: 6,818; Referee: Ricardo de Burgos Bengoetxea

10 March 2019 27	Sevilla	5–2	Real Sociedad	Seville
18:30 CET (UTC+01:00)	Sarabia 25'; Munir (yellow card) 45+2'; Ben Yedder 48', 58', 61'; Oyarzabal 69' (o.g.); Carriço (yellow card) 81'	Report	Oyarzabal 28', 77' (pen.); Zubeldia (yellow card) 36'; Navas (yellow card) 44'	Stadium: Ramón Sánchez Pizjuán; Attendance: 35,813; Referee: Ignacio Iglesias Villanueva

17 March 2019 28	Espanyol	0–1	Sevilla	Barcelona
16:15 CET (UTC+01:00)	Darder (yellow card) 65' (yellow-red card) 90+4'; Vilà (yellow card) 90+4'	Report	Ben Yedder 53' (pen.); Wöber (yellow card) 63'; Carriço (yellow card) 75'; Soriano (yellow card) 90' (yellow-red card) 90+4'	Stadium: RCDE Stadium; Attendance: 20,219; Referee: Guillermo Cuadra Fernández

31 March 2019 29	Sevilla	0–1	Valencia	Seville
16:15 CEST (UTC+02:00)	Munir (yellow card) 58'; Vázquez (yellow card) 72'; Banega (yellow card) 90'	Report	Parejo 45' (pen.); Wass (yellow card) 90+2'	Stadium: Ramón Sánchez Pizjuán; Attendance: 38,450; Referee: José Luis González González

4 April 2019 30	Sevilla	2–0	Alavés	Seville
19:30 CEST (UTC+02:00)	Navas (yellow card) 39'; Mesa 41', (yellow card) 54'; Escudero (yellow card) 45'; Sarabia 80'	Report	Wakaso (yellow card) 46'; Pina (yellow card) 60'; Borja (yellow card) 67'; Navarro (yellow card) 70'	Stadium: Ramón Sánchez Pizjuán; Attendance: 33,212; Referee: Juan Martínez Munuera

7 April 2019 31	Valladolid	0–2	Sevilla	Valladolid
16:15 CEST (UTC+02:00)	Alcaraz (yellow card) 45'; Míchel (yellow card) 47'; Moi (yellow card) 71'	Report	Banega (yellow card) 30'; Ben Yedder (yellow card) 31'; Mesa 84'; Carriço (yellow card) 89'; Munir 90+2'	Stadium: Estadio José Zorrilla; Attendance: 17,989; Referee: José María Sánchez Martínez

13 April 2019 32	Sevilla	3–2	Real Betis	Seville
20:45 CEST (UTC+02:00)	Munir 26'; Sarabia 59'; Vázquez 63'; Escudero (yellow card) 65'; Banega (yellow card) 70'; Navas (yellow card) 73'; Carriço (yellow card) 81'; Mercado (yellow card) 86'; Rog (yellow card) 90+4'	Report	Jesé (yellow card) 39'; Lo Celso 55'; Tello 82', (yellow card) 90+2'; Mandi (yellow card) 83'	Stadium: Ramón Sánchez Pizjuán; Attendance: 42,885; Referee: Alejandro Hernández Hernández

21 April 2019 33	Getafe	3–0	Sevilla	Getafe
14:00 CEST (UTC+02:00)	Mata 35' (pen.), (yellow card) 38'; Molina 45' (pen.), 53'; Bruno (yellow card) 50'; Cabrera (yellow card) 51'; Djené (red card) 74'	Report	Amadou (yellow card) 23'; Banega (yellow card) 30'; Mercado (yellow card) 32'; Vázquez (yellow card) 33'; Escudero (yellow card) 33' (yellow-red card) 45'	Stadium: Coliseum Alfonso Pérez; Attendance: 11,495; Referee: Antonio Mateu Lahoz

25 April 2019 34	Sevilla	5–0	Rayo Vallecano	Seville
19:30 CEST (UTC+02:00)	Banega (yellow card) 31'; Promes 55'; Munir 57', 62'; Ben Yedder 70'; Gil 86'	Report	Gálvez (yellow card) 33'; Pozo (yellow card) 52'	Stadium: Ramón Sánchez Pizjuán; Attendance: 32,636; Referee: Guillermo Cuadra Fernández

28 April 2019 35	Girona	1–0	Sevilla	Girona
14:00 CEST (UTC+02:00)	Muniesa (yellow card) 44'; Portu 62'	Report	Mesa (yellow card) 67'; Banega (yellow card) 90', (red card) 90+5'	Stadium: Estadi Montilivi; Attendance: 11,281; Referee: José Luis González González

3 May 2019 36	Sevilla	0–3	Leganés	Seville
21:00 CEST (UTC+02:00)	Sarabia (yellow card) 45'	Report	En-Nesyri 8'; Braithwaite 20'; Recio (yellow card) 63'; Óscar 82'	Stadium: Ramón Sánchez Pizjuán; Attendance: 32,797; Referee: Alberto Undiano Mallenco

12 May 2019 37	Atlético Madrid	1–1	Sevilla	Madrid
18:30 CEST (UTC+02:00)	Koke 30', (yellow card) 81'; Partey (yellow card) 68'; Morata (yellow card) 72'; Lemar (yellow card) 88'; Saúl (yellow card) 90+2'	Report	Mesa (yellow card) 58'; Sarabia 70'; Vidal (yellow card) 75'; Rog (yellow card) 86'; Navas (yellow card) 90'	Stadium: Metropolitano Stadium; Attendance: 60,234; Referee: Ricardo de Burgos Bengoetxea

18 May 2019 38	Sevilla	2–0	Athletic Bilbao	Seville
16:15 CEST (UTC+02:00)	Rog (yellow card) 36'; Ben Yedder 44'; Gnagnon (yellow card) 60'; Navas (yellow card) 60'; Mercado (yellow card) 65'; Munir 90+2'	Report	D. García (yellow card) 19'; R. García (yellow card) 29'	Stadium: Ramón Sánchez Pizjuán; Attendance: 28,060; Referee: José María Sánchez Martínez

=== Copa del Rey ===
Sevilla entered the competition as the 2017–18 Copa del Rey runners-up.

==== Matches ====
Win Draw Loss

===== Round of 32 =====
1 November 2018 First leg	Villanovense	0–0	Sevilla	Villanueva de la Serena
16:15 CET (UTC+01:00)	Sánchez (yellow card) 30'; Selfa (yellow card) 61'; Montero (yellow card) 79'	Report	Nolito (yellow card) 42'; Muriel (yellow card) 68'; Mena (yellow card) 78'	Stadium: Municipal Villanovense; Attendance: 7,145; Referee: Ignacio Iglesias Villanueva

5 December 2018 Second leg	Sevilla	1–0 (1–0 agg.)	Villanovense	Seville
20:30 CET (UTC+01:00)	Silva 49'	Report	Sánchez (yellow card) 34'	Stadium: Ramón Sánchez Pizjuán; Attendance: 19,908; Referee: David Medié Jiménez

===== Round of 16 =====
10 January 2019 First leg	Athletic Bilbao	1–3	Sevilla	Bilbao
19:30 CET (UTC+01:00)	San José (yellow card) 36', (goal) 49'	Report	Nolito 6'; Mesa (yellow card) 37'; Silva 53'; Vázquez (yellow card) 61'; Ben Yedder 77'	Stadium: San Mamés; Attendance: 33,847; Referee: Carlos del Cerro Grande

16 January 2019 Second leg	Sevilla	0–1 (3–2 agg.)	Athletic Bilbao	Seville
20:30 CET (UTC+01:00)	Carriço (yellow card) 89'	Report	Guruzeta 77'; Muniain (yellow card) 90+4'	Stadium: Ramón Sánchez Pizjuán; Attendance: 26,456; Referee: José Luis González González

===== Quarter-finals =====
23 January 2019 First leg	Sevilla	2–0	Barcelona	Sevilla
21:30 CET (UTC+01:00)	Sarabia 58'; Gómez (yellow card) 74'; Ben Yedder 76'	Report	Alba (yellow card) 84'	Stadium: Ramón Sánchez Pizjuán; Attendance: 38,403; Referee: Carlos del Cerro Grande

30 January 2019 Second leg	Barcelona	6–1 (6–3 agg.)	Sevilla	Barcelona
21:30 CET (UTC+01:00)	Coutinho 13' (pen.), 53'; Suárez (yellow card) 30', (goal) 89'; Rakitić 31'; Roberto 54'; Messi 90+2'	Report	Mesa (yellow card) 30'; Carriço (yellow card) 34'; Arana 67'; Gómez (yellow card) 72'	Stadium: Camp Nou; Attendance: 58,050; Referee: José María Sánchez Martínez

=== Supercopa de España ===
As Barcelona were winners of both the 2017–18 Copa del Rey and 2017–18 La Liga, Sevilla qualified as the Copa del Rey runners-up and faced Barcelona for the season opening Supercopa de España. For the first time in the tournament history, it was a single match hosted in a neutral venue at the Stade Ibn Batouta in Tangier, Morocco.

12 August 2018 Final	Sevilla	1–2	Barcelona	Tangier, Morocco
22:00 CEST	Sarabia 9'; Vázquez (yellow card) 24'; Mesa (yellow card) 69'; Vidal (yellow card) 90+4'	Report	Busquets (yellow card) 16'; Piqué 42'; Dembélé 78'; Ter Stegen (yellow card) 90'; Lenglet (yellow card) 90+2'	Stadium: Stade Ibn Batouta; Attendance: 40,000; Referee: Carlos del Cerro Grande

=== UEFA Europa League ===
Spain received three bids to the UEFA Europa League. The fifth-placed team in La Liga and the Copa del Rey winner qualify for the Europa League group stage. The sixth-placed team in La Liga begins in the Second qualifying round. As Barcelona qualified for both the Champions League (1st in La Liga) and the Europa League (Copa del Rey winner), their Europa League place is vacated. As a result, the highest-placed team in the league which have not yet qualified for European competitions (seventh-placed team, Sevilla) qualify for the Europa league.

==== Second qualifying round ====
26 July 2018 First leg	Sevilla (Spain)	4–0	(Hungary) Újpest	Seville, Spain
21:45 CEST (UTC+02:00)	Navas 7'; Ben Yedder 32' (pen.); Sarabia 43'; Pareja (yellow card) 62'; Vázquez 90+2'	Report	Pauljević (red card) 31'	Stadium: Ramón Sánchez Pizjuán; Attendance: 29,671; Referee: Andris Treimanis (Latvia)

2 August 2018 Second leg	Újpest (Hungary)	1–3 (1–7 agg.)	(Spain) Sevilla	Budapest, Hungary
21:00 CEST (UTC+02:00)	Diallo (yellow card) 69'; Zsótér 77'	Report	Sarabia 36', 50'; Muriel 83'	Stadium: Szusza Ferenc Stadion; Attendance: 9,785; Referee: Kirill Levnikov (Russia)

==== Third qualifying round ====
9 August 2018 First leg	Sevilla (Spain)	1–0	(Lithuania) Žalgiris	Seville, Spain
21:45 CEST (UTC+02:00)	Banega 34'	Report	Mbodj (yellow card) 59'; Šimkovič (yellow card) 64'	Stadium: Ramón Sánchez Pizjuán; Attendance: 26,189; Referee: Bojan Pandžić (Sweden)

16 August 2018 Second leg	Žalgiris (Lithuania)	0–5 (0–6 agg.)	(Spain) Sevilla	Vilnius, Lithuania
19:00 CEST (UTC+02:00)		Report	Nolito 6', 83'; Sarabia 7', 44'; Arana (yellow card) 75', (goal) 80'	Stadium: LFF Stadium; Attendance: 5,000; Referee: Enea Jorgji (Albania)

==== Play-off round ====
23 August 2018 First leg	Sigma Olomouc (Czech Republic)	0–1	(Spain) Sevilla	Olomouc, Czech Republic
19:00 CEST (UTC+02:00)	Sladký (yellow card) 73'	Report	Arana (yellow card) 66'; Banega (yellow card) 74'; Sarabia 84', (yellow card) 90+2'; Muriel (yellow card) 90+2'	Stadium: Andrův stadion Attendance: 11,709; Referee: Bobby Madden (Scotland)

30 August 2018 Second leg	Sevilla (Spain)	3–0 (4–0 agg.)	(Czech Republic) Sigma Olomouc	Seville, Spain
21:45 CEST (UTC+02:00)	Gonalons 21'; Nešpor 26' (o.g.); Banega (yellow card) 60'; Ben Yedder 75'	Report		Stadium: Ramón Sánchez Pizjuán; Attendance: 30,311; Referee: István Kovács (Romania)

==== Group stage ====
Pos	Team	Pld	W	D	L	GF	GA	GD	Pts	Qualification	SEV	KRA	STL	AKH
1	(Spain) Sevilla	6	4	0	2	18	6	+12	12 (Note: Head-to-head goal difference: Sevilla +2, Krasnodar –2.)	Advance to knockout phase	—	3–0	5–1	6–0
2	(Russia) Krasnodar	6	4	0	2	8	8	0	12	Advance to knockout phase	2–1	—	2–1	2–1
3	(Belgium) Standard Liège	6	3	1	2	7	9	−2	10		1–0	2–1	—	2–1
4	(Turkey) Akhisarspor	6	0	1	5	4	14	−10	1		2–3	0–1	0–0	—

Source: UEFA
Rules for classification: Group stage tiebreakers
Notes:

Win Draw Loss

20 September 2018 1	Sevilla (Spain)	5–1	(Belgium) Standard Liège	Seville, Spain
18:55 CEST (UTC+02:00)	Amadou (yellow card) 2'; Banega 8', 74' (pen.); Mesa (yellow card) 32'; Kjær (yellow card) 38'; Vázquez 41'; Ben Yedder 49', 70'	Report	Djenepo (yellow card) 3', (goal) 39'; Carcela (yellow card) 59'; Vanheusden (yellow card) 74'	Stadium: Ramón Sánchez Pizjuán; Attendance: 30,003; Referee: Gediminas Mažeika (Lithuania)

4 October 2018 2	Krasnodar (Russia)	2–1	(Spain) Sevilla	Krasnodar, Russia
21:00 CEST (UTC+02:00)	Pereyra 72'; Okriashvili 88'	Report	Kaboré 43' (o.g.)	Stadium: Krasnodar Stadium; Attendance: 31,346; Referee: Martin Strömbergsson (Sweden)

25 October 2018 3	Sevilla (Spain)	6–0	(Turkey) Akhisarspor	Seville, Spain
21:00 CEST (UTC+02:00)	Mesa 7'; Sarabia 9' (pen.); Lukač 35' (o.g.); Muriel 50'; Promes 60'; Mercado 67'	Report	Lopes (yellow card) 9'	Stadium: Ramón Sánchez Pizjuán; Attendance: 29,720; Referee: Kevin Clancy (Scotland)

8 November 2018 4	Akhisarspor (Turkey)	2–3	(Spain) Sevilla	Akhisar, Turkey
18:55 CET (UTC+01:00)	Vural (yellow card) 24'; Manu 52'; Ayık 78'; Josué (yellow card) 85'	Report	Nolito 12'; Gómez (yellow card) 35' (yellow-red card) 56'; Muriel 38'; Vázquez (yellow card) 41'; Promes (yellow card) 58'; Banega 87' (pen.)	Stadium: Spor Toto Akhisar Stadium; Attendance: 6,430; Referee: Benoît Millot (France)

29 November 2018 5	Standard Liège (Belgium)	1–0	(Spain) Sevilla	Liège, Belgium
21:00 CET (UTC+01:00)	Luyindama (yellow card) 45+2'; Djenepo (yellow card) 60', (goal) 62'; Sá (yellow card) 72'	Report	Banega (yellow card) 33'; Mesa (yellow card) 39'; Vázquez (yellow card) 55'; Sarabia (yellow card) 64' (yellow-red card) 68'	Stadium: Stade Maurice Dufrasne; Attendance: 12,882; Referee: Daniel Siebert (Germany)

13 December 2018 6	Sevilla (Spain)	3–0	(Russia) Krasnodar	Seville, Spain
18:55 CET (UTC+01:00)	Ben Yedder 5', 10'; Promes (yellow card) 40'; Banega 49' (pen.), (yellow card) 65'	Report	Gazinsky (yellow card) 14'; Ramírez (yellow card) 40' (yellow-red card) 48'	Stadium: Ramón Sánchez Pizjuán; Attendance: 34,114; Referee: Daniel Stefański (Poland)

==== Knockout phase ====
===== Round of 32 =====
14 February 2019 First leg	Lazio (Italy)	0–1	(Spain) Sevilla	Rome, Italy
18:55 CET (UTC+01:00)	Radu (yellow card) 31'; Correa (yellow card) 60'; Acerbi (yellow card) 90+3'	Report	Ben Yedder 22'; Banega (yellow card) 44'; Mercado (yellow card) 90+1'	Stadium: Stadio Olimpico; Attendance: 19,766; Referee: Slavko Vinčić (Slovenia)

20 February 2019 Second leg	Sevilla (Spain)	2–0 (3–0 agg.)	(Italy) Lazio	Seville, Spain
18:00 CET (UTC+01:00)	Vázquez (yellow card) 18' (yellow-red card) 60'; Ben Yedder 20'; Sarabia 78'	Report	Patric (yellow card) 21'; Caicedo (yellow card) 31'; Marušić (red card) 71'; Immobile (yellow card) 84'	Stadium: Ramón Sánchez Pizjuán; Attendance: 34,521; Referee: Anthony Taylor (England)
Note: The Sevilla v Lazio match was scheduled on 20 February in order to avoid a scheduling conflict with the Real Betis v Rennes match, in the same city.

===== Round of 16 =====
7 March 2019 First leg	Sevilla (Spain)	2–2	(Czech Republic) Slavia Prague	Seville, Spain
18:55 CET (UTC+01:00)	Ben Yedder 1'; Banega (yellow card) 12'; Munir 28'	Report	Coufal (yellow card) 5'; Stoch 25'; Král 39'; Masopust (yellow card) 44'; Souček (yellow card) 63'	Stadium: Ramón Sánchez Pizjuán; Attendance: 30,698; Referee: Ruddy Buquet (France)

14 March 2019 Second leg	Slavia Prague (Czech Republic)	4–3 (a.e.t.) (6–5 agg.)	(Spain) Sevilla	Prague, Czech Republic
21:00 CET (UTC+01:00)	Ngadeu-Ngadjui 15'; Kolář (yellow card) 43'; Souček 47' (pen.), (yellow card) 111'; Král (yellow card) 67'; Olayinka (yellow card) 88'; Van Buren 102'; Traoré 119'	Report	Ben Yedder 44' (pen.); Munir 54'; Vázquez 98', (yellow card) 98'	Stadium: Sinobo Stadium; Attendance: 19,020; Referee: Aleksei Kulbakov (Belarus)

== Statistics ==
=== Squad appearances and goals ===
Last updated on 18 May 2019.

No.	Pos	Nat	Player	Total		La Liga		Europa League		Copa del Rey		Supercopa	
No.	Pos	Nat	Player	Apps	Goals	Apps	Goals	Apps	Goals	Apps	Goals	Apps	Goals
Goalkeepers
1	GK	(Czech Republic) CZE	Tomáš Vaclík	49	0	33	0	15	0	0	0	1	0
13	GK	(Spain) ESP	Juan Soriano	11	0	4	0	0+1	0	6	0	0	0
34	GK	(Spain) ESP	Javi Díaz	1	0	1	0	0	0	0	0	0	0
Defenders
3	DF	(Spain) ESP	Sergi Gómez	48	0	31+1	0	12+1	0	2	0	1	0
4	DF	(Denmark) DEN	Simon Kjær	37	0	25+1	0	7	0	3	0	1	0
6	DF	(Portugal) POR	Daniel Carriço	38	1	24	1	10+1	0	3	0	0	0
14	DF	(Austria) AUT	Maximilian Wöber	8	0	6+1	0	1	0	0	0	0	0
18	DF	(Spain) ESP	Sergio Escudero	31	0	18+3	0	7	0	2	0	1	0
23	DF	(Brazil) BRA	Guilherme Arana	21	2	8+1	0	7+1	1	3+1	1	0	0
24	DF	(France) FRA	Joris Gnagnon	16	0	4+3	0	6	0	3	0	0	0
25	DF	(Argentina) ARG	Gabriel Mercado	35	3	19+4	2	7	1	4	0	1	0
37	DF	(Spain) ESP	Juan Berrocal	3	0	0	0	2+1	0	0	0	0	0
40	DF	(Spain) ESP	Javier Vázquez	1	0	0	0	0	0	1	0	0	0
Midfielders
5	MF	(France) FRA	Ibrahim Amadou	32	0	7+10	0	5+4	0	6	0	0	0
7	MF	(Spain) ESP	Roque Mesa	48	3	20+11	2	7+4	1	5	0	1	0
10	MF	(Argentina) ARG	Éver Banega	51	8	32	3	13	5	2+3	0	1	0
11	DF	(Spain) ESP	Aleix Vidal	21	0	5+6	0	7	0	2	0	0+1	0
15	MF	(France) FRA	Maxime Gonalons	13	1	5+5	0	2+1	1	0	0	0	0
16	MF	(Spain) ESP	Jesús Navas	44	2	31+1	1	8+2	1	1	0	1	0
17	MF	(Spain) ESP	Pablo Sarabia	52	22	30+3	12	9+4	8	2+3	1	1	1
20	MF	(Croatia) CRO	Marko Rog	13	0	4+6	0	1+2	0	0	0	0	0
21	MF	(Netherlands) NED	Quincy Promes	49	3	15+18	2	7+3	1	6	0	0	0
22	MF	(Argentina) ARG	Franco Vázquez	52	6	26+8	3	10+2	3	3+2	0	1	0
26	MF	(Spain) ESP	Pejiño	3	0	0	0	2+1	0	0	0	0	0
29	MF	(Spain) ESP	Pepe Mena	1	0	0	0	0	0	0+1	0	0	0
Forwards
8	FW	(Spain) ESP	Nolito	17	4	1+3	0	7+3	3	3	1	0	0
9	FW	(France) FRA	Wissam Ben Yedder	54	30	31+4	18	11+2	10	2+3	2	0+1	0
12	FW	(Portugal) POR	André Silva	40	11	25+2	9	4+4	0	3+1	2	0+1	0
19	FW	(Spain) ESP	Munir El Haddadi	20	7	12+4	5	2+1	2	1	0	0	0
41	FW	(Spain) ESP	Bryan Gil	13	1	0+11	1	0	0	0+2	0	0	0
Players who have made an appearance this season but have left the club
1	GK	(Spain) ESP	Sergio Rico	1	0	0	0	1	0	0	0	0	0
2	DF	(France) FRA	Sébastien Corchia	2	0	0	0	1+1	0	0	0	0	0
14	FW	(Colombia) COL	Luis Muriel	19	4	1+5	1	4+6	3	2	0	1	0
19	MF	(Brazil) BRA	Ganso	1	0	0	0	0+1	0	0	0	0	0
20	MF	(Spain) ESP	Borja Lasso	2	0	0	0	0+1	0	1	0	0	0
21	DF	(Argentina) ARG	Nicolás Pareja	1	0	0	0	1	0	0	0	0	0

=== Clean sheets ===
Last updated on 29 May 2019.

No.	Name	La Liga	Europa League	Copa del Rey	Supercopa	Total	Starts
1	(Czech Republic) Tomáš Vaclík	8	9	0	0	17	49
13	(Spain) Juan Soriano	3	0	3	0	6	10
34	(Spain) Javier Díaz	0	0	0	0	0	1
~~1~~	(Spain) Sergio Rico	0	0	0	0	0	1
TOTALS		11	9	3	0	23	61

=== Disciplinary record ===
Includes all competitive matches.

N	P	Nat.	Name	La Liga			Europa League			Copa del Rey			Supercopa			Total			Notes
N	P	Nat.	Name	Yellow card	Second yellow card	Red card	Yellow card	Second yellow card	Red card	Yellow card	Second yellow card	Red card	Yellow card	Second yellow card	Red card	Yellow card	Second yellow card	Red card	Notes
1	GK	(Czech Republic)	Tomáš Vaclík	1												1			
3	DF	(Spain)	Sergi Gómez	1				1		2						3	1		
4	DF	(Denmark)	Simon Kjær	5			1									6			
5	DF	(France)	Ibrahim Amadou	2			1									3			
6	MF	(Portugal)	Daniel Carriço	10						2						12			
7	MF	(Spain)	Roque Mesa	10			2			2			1			15			
8	FW	(Spain)	Nolito							1						1			
9	FW	(France)	Wissam Ben Yedder	4												4			
10	MF	(Argentina)	Éver Banega	15	1	1	6									21	1	1	Ban sustained - 3 Games (La Liga) for infringement of article 123.2 RFEF Disciplinary Code; Banned on 3 May 2019
11	MF	(Spain)	Aleix Vidal	3									1			4			
12	FW	(Portugal)	André Silva	4												4			
13	GK	(Spain)	Juan Soriano		1												1		
14	DF	(Austria)	Maximilian Wöber	2												2			
16	MF	(Spain)	Jesús Navas	8												8			
17	MF	(Spain)	Pablo Sarabia	9			1	1								10	1		
18	DF	(Spain)	Sergio Escudero	6	1											6	1		
19	FW	(Spain)	Munir El Haddadi	2												2			
20	MF	(Croatia)	Marko Rog	5												5			
21	MF	(Netherlands)	Quincy Promes	2			2						1			5			
22	MF	(Argentina)	Franco Vázquez	8		1	3	1		1			1			13	1	1	Ban sustained - 2 Games (La Liga) for infringement of article 117 RFEF Disciplinary Code; Banned on 6 January 2019 - Returned on 19 January 2019
23	DF	(Brazil)	Guilherme Arana	3			2									5			
24	DF	(France)	Joris Gnagnon	2												2			
25	DF	(Argentina)	Gabriel Mercado	10			1									11			
29	MF	(Spain)	Pepe Mena							1						1			
~~14~~	FW	(Colombia)	Luis Muriel				1			1						2			
~~21~~	DF	(Argentina)	Nicolás Pareja				1									1			

Last updated: 29 May 2019
Source: ESPNFC.com
Ordered by (red card) , (second yellow card) and (yellow card)
(yellow card) = Number of bookings; (second yellow card) = Number of sending offs after a second yellow card; (red card) = Number of sending offs by a direct red card.
