= 2018 Supercopa de España =

- Event: Supercopa de España
Sevilla	Barcelona
Copa del Rey	La Liga
1	2
- Date: 12 August 2018
- Venue: Ibn Batouta Stadium, Tangier, Morocco
- Referee: Carlos del Cerro Grande
- Attendance: 40,000

The 2018 Supercopa de España was the 35th edition of the Supercopa de España, an annual football super cup contested by the winners of the previous season's La Liga and Copa del Rey competitions.

The match was played between the Copa del Rey runners-up, Sevilla, and the winners of the 2017–18 Copa del Rey and 2017–18 La Liga, Barcelona, making it a rematch of the 2018 Copa del Rey Final.

Unlike all the previous editions, it was a single match hosted at a neutral venue. This year's venue was Ibn Batouta Stadium in Tangier, Morocco.

The match was broadcast on Spanish RTVE public television network La 1, earning an average 36.5% share and 4,785,000 viewers.

== Venue ==
Location of the host city of the 2018 Supercopa de España.	City	Stadium
Location of the host city of the 2018 Supercopa de España.	Tangier	Ibn Batouta Stadium
Location of the host city of the 2018 Supercopa de España.	Capacity: 65,000	

== Match ==
=== Details ===
12 August 2018
21:00 WEST

Sevilla	1–2	Barcelona
Sarabia 9'	Report	Piqué 42'; Dembélé 78'

Ibn Batouta Stadium, Tangier (Morocco)
Attendance: 40,000
Referee: Carlos del Cerro Grande

Sevilla	Barcelona

GK	13	(Czech Republic) Tomáš Vaclík
CB	25	(Argentina) Gabriel Mercado		(substituted off) 85'
CB	4	(Denmark) Simon Kjær
CB	3	(Spain) Sergi Gómez
RM	16	(Spain) Jesús Navas
CM	10	(Argentina) Éver Banega
CM	7	(Spain) Roque Mesa	(yellow card) 69'
CM	17	(Spain) Pablo Sarabia		(substituted off) 71'
LM	18	(Spain) Sergio Escudero (c)
CF	22	(Argentina) Franco Vázquez	(yellow card) 24'
CF	14	(Colombia) Luis Muriel		(substituted off) 60'
Substitutes:
GK	32	(Spain) Juan Soriano
DF	6	(Portugal) Daniel Carriço
DF	11	(Spain) Aleix Vidal	(yellow card) 90+4'	(substituted on) 71'
MF	5	(France) Ibrahim Amadou
FW	8	(Spain) Nolito
FW	9	(France) Wissam Ben Yedder		(substituted on) 85'
FW	12	(Portugal) André Silva		(substituted on) 60'
Manager:
(Spain) Pablo Machín

GK	1	(Germany) Marc-André ter Stegen	(yellow card) 90'
RB	2	(Portugal) Nélson Semedo
CB	3	(Spain) Gerard Piqué
CB	15	(France) Clément Lenglet	(yellow card) 90+2'
LB	18	(Spain) Jordi Alba
DM	5	(Spain) Sergio Busquets	(yellow card) 16'
CM	12	(Brazil) Rafinha		(substituted off) 46'
CM	8	(Brazil) Arthur		(substituted off) 53'
RW	10	(Argentina) Lionel Messi (c)
CF	9	(Uruguay) Luis Suárez
LW	11	(France) Ousmane Dembélé		(substituted off) 86'
Substitutes:
GK	13	(Netherlands) Jasper Cillessen
DF	23	(France) Samuel Umtiti
DF	27	(Spain) Juan Miranda
MF	4	(Croatia) Ivan Rakitić		(substituted on) 46'
MF	7	(Brazil) Philippe Coutinho		(substituted on) 53'
MF	22	(Chile) Arturo Vidal		(substituted on) 86'
FW	19	(Morocco) Munir
Manager:
(Spain) Ernesto Valverde

== See also ==
- 2018–19 La Liga
- 2018–19 Copa del Rey
- 2018–19 FC Barcelona season
- 2018–19 Sevilla FC season
