= 2019–20 Sevilla FC season =

113th season in existence of Sevilla FC

Sevilla FC
2019–20 season
- President: José Castro Carmona
- Head coach: Julen Lopetegui
- Stadium: Ramón Sánchez Pizjuán
- La Liga: 4th
- Copa del Rey: Round of 16
- UEFA Europa League: Winners
- Top goalscorer: League: Lucas Ocampos (14); All: Lucas Ocampos (17)
- Highest home attendance: 42,354 (vs Real Madrid, 22 September 2019)
- Lowest home attendance: 19,803 (vs Qarabağ, 28 November 2019)
Home colours	Away colours	Third colours

The 2019–20 season was the 113th season in existence of Sevilla FC and the club's 19th consecutive season in La Liga, the top league of Spanish football. Sevilla competed in La Liga, the Copa del Rey and the UEFA Europa League, winning the latter for a record sixth time.

== Kit ==
On 21 May 2018, Sevilla announced a new three-year kit supply contract with American sportswear giant Nike from 2018–2021.

== Players ==
=== Squad ===
As of 18 June 2020

Note: Flags indicate national team as defined under FIFA eligibility rules; some limited exceptions apply. Players may hold more than one non-FIFA nationality.

No.	Pos.	Nation	Player
1	GK	CZE	Tomáš Vaclík
3	DF	ESP	Sergi Gómez
5	FW	ARG	Lucas Ocampos
7	FW	POR	Rony Lopes
10	MF	ARG	Éver Banega
11	FW	ESP	Munir
12	DF	FRA	Jules Koundé
13	GK	MAR	Bono (on loan from Girona)
14	FW	ESP	Suso (on loan from Milan)
15	FW	MAR	Youssef En-Nesyri
16	MF	ESP	Jesús Navas

No.	Pos.	Nation	Player
17	MF	SRB	Nemanja Gudelj
18	DF	ESP	Sergio Escudero
19	FW	NED	Luuk de Jong
20	DF	BRA	Diego Carlos
21	MF	ESP	Óliver Torres
22	MF	ARG	Franco Vázquez
23	DF	ESP	Sergio Reguilón (on loan from Real Madrid)
24	MF	ESP	Joan Jordán
25	MF	BRA	Fernando
31	GK	ESP	Javi Díaz

=== Players In ===
No.	Pos.	Nat.	Name	Age	EU	Moving from	Type	Transfer window	Ends	Transfer fee	Source
27	AM	(Spain)	Alejandro Pozo	20	EU	Granada	Loan Return	Summer	2020	Free	
-	CB	(Austria)	Maximilian Wöber	21	EU	(Netherlands) Ajax	Transfer	Summer	2023	€10.5M	Sevilla FC
9	CF	(Israel)	Mu'nas Dabbur	27	Non-EU	(Austria) Red Bull Salzburg	Transfer	Summer	2023	€15M	Sevilla FC
20	CB	(Brazil)	Diego Carlos	26	Non-EU	(France) Nantes	Transfer	Summer	2024	€15M	Sevilla FC
24	CM	(Spain)	Joan Jordán	24	EU	Eibar	Transfer	Summer	2023	€14M	Sevilla FC
19	CF	(Netherlands)	Luuk de Jong	28	EU	(Netherlands) PSV Eindhoven	Transfer	Summer	2023	€12.5M	Sevilla FC
12	CB	(France)	Jules Koundé	20	EU	(France) Bordeaux	Transfer	Summer	2024	€25M	Sevilla FC
5	LW	(Argentina)	Lucas Ocampos	24	Non-EU	(France) Marseille	Transfer	Summer	2024	€15M	Sevilla FC
23	LB	(Spain)	Sergio Reguilón	22	EU	Real Madrid	Loan	Summer	2020	Free	Sevilla FC
25	DM	(Brazil)	Fernando	31	EU	(Turkey) Galatasaray	Transfer	Summer	2022	€4.5M	Sevilla FC
21	CM	(Spain)	Óliver Torres	24	EU	(Portugal) Porto	Transfer	Summer	2024	€12M	Sevilla FC
-	CM	(Cameroon)	Yan Eteki	21	EU	Almería	Transfer	Summer	N/A	€0.5M	
17	CM	(Serbia)	Nemanja Gudelj	27	EU	(China) Guangzhou Evergrande	Transfer	Summer	2023	Free	Sevilla FC
7	RW	(Portugal)	Rony Lopes	23	EU	(France) Monaco	Transfer	Summer	2024	€25M	Sevilla FC
14	CF	(Mexico)	Javier Hernández	31	Non-EU	(England) West Ham United	Transfer	Summer	2022	€7.75M	Sevilla FC
13	GK	(Morocco)	Yassine Bounou	28	Non-EU	Girona	Loan	Summer	2020	Free	Sevilla FC
15	CF	(Morocco)	Youssef En-Nesyri	22	Non-EU	Leganés	Transfer	Winter	2025	€20M	Sevilla FC
14	RW	(Spain)	Suso	26	EU	(Italy) Milan	Loan	Winter	2021	Free	Sevilla FC

Total spending: ▼€176.75M

=== Players Out ===
No.	Pos.	Nat.	Name	Age	EU	Moving to	Type	Transfer window	Transfer fee	Source
12	CF	(Portugal)	André Silva	23	EU	(Italy) Milan	Loan Return	Summer	Free	
15	DM	(France)	Maxime Gonalons	30	EU	(Italy) Roma	Loan Return	Summer	Free	
20	CM	(Croatia)	Marko Rog	23	EU	(Italy) Napoli	Loan Return	Summer	Free	
25	CB	(Argentina)	Gabriel Mercado	32	EU	(Qatar) Al Rayyan	Transfer	Summer	Free	Sevilla FC
14	CF	(Colombia)	Luis Muriel	28	Non-EU	(Italy) Atalanta	Transfer	Summer	€18M	Atalanta B.C.
21	LW	(Netherlands)	Quincy Promes	27	EU	(Netherlands) Ajax	Transfer	Summer	€15.7M	AFC Ajax
-	CF	(Spain)	Marc Gual	23	EU	Girona	Loan	Summer	Free	Girona FC
17	AM	(Spain)	Pablo Sarabia	27	EU	(France) Paris Saint-Germain	Transfer	Summer	€20M	Paris SG
13	GK	(Spain)	Juan Soriano	21	EU	Leganés	Loan	Summer	Free	CD Leganés
-	CM	(Georgia (country))	Giorgi Aburjania	24	EU	(Netherlands) Twente	Loan	Summer	Free	FC Twente
-	CM	(Cameroon)	Yan Eteki	21	EU	Granada	Transfer	Summer	€1M	
11	RB	(Spain)	Aleix Vidal	29	EU	Alavés	Loan	Summer	Free	Alavés
5	DM	(France)	Ibrahim Amadou	26	EU	(England) Norwich City	Loan	Summer	€1.5M	Norwich City
14	CB	(Austria)	Maximilian Wöber	21	EU	(Austria) Red Bull Salzburg	Transfer	Summer	€12M	RB Salzburg
9	CF	(France)	Wissam Ben Yedder	29	EU	(France) Monaco	Transfer	Summer	€40.6M	AS Monaco FC
-	CF	(Spain)	Carlos Fernández	29	EU	Granada	Loan	Summer	Free	Granada CF
7	CM	(Spain)	Roque Mesa	29	EU	Leganés	Loan	Summer	Free	CD Leganés
2	RB	(France)	Sébastien Corchia	28	EU	Espanyol	Loan	Summer	Free	
15	CB	(France)	Joris Gnagnon	22	EU	(France) Rennes	Loan	Summer	Free	
14	LB	(Brazil)	Guilherme Arana	22	Non-EU	(Italy) Atalanta	Loan	Summer	€1M	
13	GK	(Spain)	Sergio Rico	26	EU	(France) Paris Saint-Germain	Loan	Summer	Free	
4	DF	(Denmark)	Simon Kjær	30	EU	(Italy) Atalanta	Loan	Summer	Free	
9	FW	(Israel)	Mu'nas Dabbur	27	EU	(Germany) 1899 Hoffenheim	Transfer	Winter	€12M	Hoffenheim
4	DF	(Denmark)	Simon Kjær	30	EU	(Italy) Milan	Loan	Winter	Free	Milan
15	AM	(Spain)	Alejandro Pozo	20	EU	Mallorca	Loan	Winter	Free	Mallorca
14	CF	(Mexico)	Javier Hernández	31	Non-EU	(United States) LA Galaxy	Transfer	Winter		LA Galaxy
14	LB	(Brazil)	Guilherme Arana	22	Non-EU	(Brazil) Atlético Mineiro	Loan	Winter	Free	Sevilla FC
-	CF	(Spain)	Marc Gual	24	EU	Real Madrid Castilla	Loan	Winter	Free	Girona FC
30	LW	(Spain)	Bryan Gil	18	EU	Leganés	Loan	Winter	Free	Sevilla FC
5	DM	(France)	Ibrahim Amadou	26	EU	Leganés	Loan	Winter	Free	Sevilla FC
6	CB	(Portugal)	Daniel Carriço	31	EU	(China) Wuhan Zall	Transfer	Winter	€2M	Sevilla FC
8	FW	(Spain)	Nolito	33	EU	Celta Vigo	Transfer	Winter	Free	RC Celta

Total income: ▲€123.8M

Net: ▼€52.95M

== Pre-season and friendlies ==
Win Draw Loss Fixtures

13 July 2019 Friendly	Sevilla	2–1	Reading	La Rinconada, Spain
21:00 CEST (UTC+2)	Nolito 67' (pen.); Lara 86'	Report	Novakovich 57'	Stadium: Felipe del Valle Stadium

17 July 2019 FC Dallas Summer Classic	FC Dallas	1–3	Sevilla	Dallas, United States
19:00 CST (UTC−5)	Mosquera 42'; Cerrillo (yellow card) 59'; Atuahene (yellow card) 90+3'	Report	De Jong 22'; Vázquez (yellow card) 38'; Jordán 52'; Pozo (yellow card) 66'; Nolito 83'; Mesa (yellow card) 90+1'	Stadium: Toyota Stadium; Attendance: 12,248; Referee: Alex Chilowicz (United States)

21 July 2019 Friendly	Liverpool	1–2	Sevilla	Boston, United States
18:00 EST (UTC−4)	Woodburn (yellow card) 36'; Origi 44'	Report	Banega (yellow card) 12'; Diego Carlos (yellow card) 35'; Nolito 37'; Gnagnon (red card) 76'; Pozo 90'	Stadium: Fenway Park; Referee: Fotis Bazakos (United States)

27 July 2019 Opel Cup	Everton	0–1	Sevilla	Mainz, Germany
13:00 CEST (UTC+2)		Report	Ocampos 46' (pen.)	Stadium: Opel Arena; Referee: Marcel Gasteier (Germany)

27 July 2019 Opel Cup	Mainz 05	0–5	Sevilla	Mainz, Germany
14:30 CEST (UTC+2)		Report	Pozo 10'; Munir 12', 20'; Dabbur 28', 57'	Stadium: Opel Arena

3 August 2019 Friendly	1899 Hoffenheim	1–2	Sevilla	Hoffenheim, Germany
15:30 CEST (UTC+2)	Grifo 29' (pen.)	Report	Munir 39'; Banega 50'	Stadium: Wirsol Rhein-Neckar-Arena

4 August 2019 Friendly	1899 Hoffenheim	0–4	Sevilla	Hoffenheim, Germany
13:30 CEST (UTC+2)		Report	Nolito 16', 28', 49'; Dabbur 60'	Stadium: Dietmar Hopp Stadion

9 August 2019 Friendly	Granada	2–1	Sevilla	Granada, Spain
21:00 CEST (UTC+2)	Germán 58'; Ramos 90+1'	Report	Diego Carlos 85'	Stadium: Estadio Nuevo Los Cármenes; Referee: César Soto Grado

10 August 2019 Friendly	Extremadura	2–2	Sevilla	Almendralejo, Spain
21:00 CEST (UTC+2)	Pastrana 8'; López 90+1'	Report	Kjær 42'; De Jong 58'	Stadium: Estadio Francisco de la Hera; Referee: Luis Mario Milla Alvendiz

== Competitions ==
Win Draw Loss Fixtures

=== Overall ===
Competition	First match	Last match	Starting round	Final position	Record							
Competition	First match	Last match	Starting round	Final position	Pld	W	D	L	GF	GA	GD	Win %
La Liga	18 August 2019	19 July 2020	Matchday 1	4th	38	19	13	6	54	34	+20	50.00
Copa del Rey	18 December 2019	30 January 2020	First round	Round of 16	4	3	0	1	10	4	+6	75.00
Europa League	19 September 2019	21 August 2020	Group stage	Winners	12	9	2	1	23	7	+16	75.00
Total					54	31	15	8	87	45	+42	57.41

Last updated: 21 August 2020
Source: Competitions

=== La Liga ===
==== League table ====
Pos	Team	Pld	W	D	L	GF	GA	GD	Pts	Qualification or relegation
2	Barcelona	38	25	7	6	86	38	+48	82	Qualification for the Champions League group stage
3	Atlético Madrid	38	18	16	4	51	27	+24	70	Qualification for the Champions League group stage
4	Sevilla	38	19	13	6	54	34	+20	70	Qualification for the Champions League group stage
5	Villarreal	38	18	6	14	63	49	+14	60	Qualification for the Europa League group stage
6	Real Sociedad	38	16	8	14	56	48	+8	56	Qualification for the Europa League group stage

Source: La Liga, Soccerway
Rules for classification: 1) Points; 2) Head-to-head points; 3) Head-to-head goal difference; 4) Goal difference; 5) Goals scored; 6) Fair-play points (Note: Head-to-head record is used only after all the matches between the teams in question have been played)

==== Results summary ====
Overall								Home						Away					
Pld	W	D	L	GF	GA	GD	Pts	W	D	L	GF	GA	GD	W	D	L	GF	GA	GD
38	19	13	6	54	34	+20	70	10	7	2	26	14	+12	9	6	4	28	20	+8

Last updated: 19 July 2020.
Source: Competitive matches

==== Results by round ====
Round	1	2	3	4	5	6	7	8	9	10	11	12	13	14	15	16	17	18	19	20	21	22	23	24	25	26	27	28	29	30	31	32	33	34	35	36	37	38
Ground	A	A	H	A	H	A	H	A	H	H	A	H	A	A	H	A	H	A	H	A	H	H	A	H	A	H	A	H	A	H	A	H	A	H	A	H	A	H
Result	W	W	D	W	L	L	W	L	W	W	D	D	W	W	W	D	L	W	D	L	W	D	L	D	W	W	D	W	D	D	D	D	W	W	W	W	D	W
Position	2	1	3	1	5	7	6	6	6	6	5	5	4	3	3	3	3	3	4	4	3	4	5	5	4	3	3	3	3	4	4	4	4	4	4	4	4	4

Updated to match(es) played on 19 July 2020. Source: Competitive matches
A = Away; H = Home; W = Win; D = Draw; L = Loss

==== Matches ====
The La Liga schedule was announced on 4 July 2019.

18 August 2019 1	Espanyol	0–2	Sevilla	Cornellà de Llobregat
19:00 CEST (UTC+2)	Sánchez (yellow card) 52'; Vargas (yellow card) 59'	Report	Reguilón (yellow card) 39', (goal) 44'; Ocampos (yellow card) 50'; Nolito 86'	Stadium: RCDE Stadium; Attendance: 19,832; Referee: Juan Martínez Munuera

23 August 2019 2	Granada	0–1	Sevilla	Granada
20:00 CEST (UTC+2)	Germán (yellow card) 45+5'	Report	Jordán 52'; Fernando (yellow card) 61'	Stadium: Nuevo Los Cármenes; Attendance: 15,880; Referee: José María Sánchez Martínez

30 August 2019 3	Sevilla	1–1	Celta Vigo	Seville
20:00 CEST (UTC+2)	Munir (yellow card) 34'; Diego Carlos (yellow card) 54'; Fernando (yellow card) 78'; Vázquez 81'; Gil (yellow card) 85'	Report	Kevin (yellow card) 24'; Méndez (yellow card) 45+3'; Suárez 84'	Stadium: Ramón Sánchez Pizjuán; Attendance: 37,787; Referee: Carlos del Cerro Grande

15 September 2019 4	Alavés	0–1	Sevilla	Vitoria-Gasteiz
14:00 CEST (UTC+2)	Burke (yellow card) 47'; Duarte (yellow card) 77'; Sainz (yellow card) 90+1'; Laguardia (yellow card) 90+2'; Wakaso (yellow card) 90+2'	Report	Jordán 52'; Carriço (yellow card) 58'; Reguilón (yellow card) 75'; Gudelj (yellow card) 90'; Diego Carlos (yellow card) 90+2'; Ocampos (yellow card) 90+2'	Stadium: Mendizorrotza; Attendance: 16,309; Referee: Alejandro Hernández Hernández

22 September 2019 5	Sevilla	0–1	Real Madrid	Seville
21:00 CEST (UTC+2)	Banega (yellow card) 26'; Jordán (yellow card) 53'; De Jong (yellow card) 90+5'	Report	Carvajal (yellow card) 20'; Ramos (yellow card) 62'; Benzema 64'	Stadium: Ramón Sánchez Pizjuán; Attendance: 42,354; Referee: Juan Martínez Munuera

26 September 2019 6	Eibar	3–2	Sevilla	Eibar
19:00 CEST (UTC+2)	Arbilla (yellow card) 19'; Expósito (yellow card) 56'; Orellana 66' (pen.); León 77'; Cote 82'; Oliveira (yellow card) 90+4'	Report	Ocampos 11'; Óliver 33'; Escudero (yellow card) 49'; Jordán (yellow card) 70'; Gudelj (yellow card) 84'; Diego Carlos (yellow card) 90+1'	Stadium: Ipurua; Attendance: 5,434; Referee: Pablo González Fuertes

29 September 2019 7	Sevilla	3–2	Real Sociedad	Seville
21:00 CEST (UTC+2)	Nolito 18'; Ocampos 47'; Fernando (yellow card) 59'; Vázquez 80'	Report	Oyarzabal 4'; Ødegaard (yellow card) 57'; Portu 87'	Stadium: Ramón Sánchez Pizjuán; Attendance: 37,414; Referee: Javier Alberola Rojas

6 October 2019 8	Barcelona	4–0	Sevilla	Barcelona
21:00 CEST (UTC+2)	Suárez 27', (yellow card) 64'; Vidal 32'; Dembélé 35', (yellow card) 53' (yellow-red card) 88'; Semedo (yellow card) 39'; Messi 78'; Piqué (yellow card) 85'; Araújo (red card) 87'; Busquets (yellow card) 88'	Report	Reguilón (yellow card) 22'; Carriço (yellow card) 34'; Banega (yellow card) 90+1'	Stadium: Camp Nou; Attendance: 81,331; Referee: Antonio Mateu Lahoz

20 October 2019 9	Sevilla	1–0	Levante	Seville
21:00 CEST (UTC+2)	Fernando (yellow card) 58'; Koundé (yellow card) 77'; De Jong 86'	Report	Cabaco (yellow card) 14'; Vezo (yellow card) 90+3'	Stadium: Ramón Sánchez Pizjuán; Attendance: 34,612; Referee: Guillermo Cuadra Fernández

27 October 2019 10	Sevilla	2–0	Getafe	Seville
18:30 CET (UTC+1)	Banega (yellow card) 15'; Hernández 69'; Ocampos 78', (yellow card) 90'	Report	Jason (yellow card) 18'; Mata (yellow card) 23'; Olivera (yellow card) 71'	Stadium: Ramón Sánchez Pizjuán; Attendance: 38,181; Referee: José María Sánchez Martínez

30 October 2019 11	Valencia	1–1	Sevilla	Valencia
19:00 CET (UTC+1)	Torres (yellow card) 45+2'; Soler (yellow card) 45+5'; Garay (yellow card) 52'; Gabriel (yellow card) 68'; Sobrino 81'; Parejo (yellow card) 90'; Lee Kang-in (yellow card) 90+4'	Report	Jordán (yellow card) 32'; Ocampos 45+3'; Fernando (yellow card) 74'	Stadium: Mestalla; Attendance: 37,881; Referee: Carlos del Cerro Grande

2 November 2019 12	Sevilla	1–1	Atlético Madrid	Seville
18:30 CET (UTC+1)	Vázquez 28', (yellow card) 39'; Torres (yellow card) 40'; Jordán (yellow card) 79'; Gudelj (yellow card) 87'	Report	Lodi (yellow card) 27'; Partey (yellow card) 34'; Morata 60'; Correa (yellow card) 80'	Stadium: Ramón Sánchez Pizjuán; Attendance: 39,957; Referee: José Luis González González

10 November 2019 13	Real Betis	1–2	Sevilla	Seville
21:00 CET (UTC+1)	Feddal (yellow card) 12'; Loren 45'; Emerson (yellow card) 66'	Report	Ocampos 13', (yellow card) 37'; Torres (yellow card) 19'; De Jong 55'; Fernando (yellow card) 71'	Stadium: Estadio Benito Villamarín; Attendance: 52,123; Referee: Alejandro Hernández Hernández

24 November 2019 14	Valladolid	0–1	Sevilla	Valladolid
21:00 CET (UTC+1)	Masip (yellow card) 12'; Nacho (yellow card) 15'; Toni (yellow card) 89'	Report	Banega 13' (pen.); Ocampos (yellow card) 15' (yellow-red card) 90+1'; De Jong (yellow card) 64'; Fernando (yellow card) 89'	Stadium: José Zorrilla; Attendance: 18,169; Referee: Eduardo Prieto Iglesias

1 December 2019 15	Sevilla	1–0	Leganés	Seville
12:00 CET (UTC+1)	Torres (yellow card) 56'; Diego Carlos 63'; Gil (yellow card) 90+4'; Vázquez (yellow card) 90+5'	Report	Awaziem (yellow card) 49'; Óscar (yellow card) 68'; Rosales (yellow card) 90+4'	Stadium: Ramón Sánchez Pizjuán; Attendance: 33,648; Referee: Ricardo de Burgos Bengoetxea

8 December 2019 16	Osasuna	1–1	Sevilla	Pamplona
21:00 CET (UTC+1)	Rodríguez (yellow card) 16'; Ávila 45+2'; Oier (yellow card) 49' (yellow-red card) 61'; Mérida (yellow card) 77'	Report	Koundé (yellow card) 10'; Munir 11'; Reguilón (yellow card) 44'; Banega (yellow card) 46'; Navas (yellow card) 89'	Stadium: El Sadar; Attendance: 15,045; Referee: Xavier Estrada Fernández

15 December 2019 17	Sevilla	1–2	Villarreal	Seville
18:30 CET (UTC+1)	Munir 61'; Torres (yellow card) 63'; Diego Carlos (yellow card) 90+4'	Report	Albiol 13'; Toko Ekambi 74'	Stadium: Ramón Sánchez Pizjuán; Attendance: 36,586; Referee: Adrián Cordero Vega

21 December 2019 18	Mallorca	0–2	Sevilla	Palma
13:00 CET (UTC+1)	Gámez (yellow card) 37'; Budimir (yellow card) 45+4'; Baba (yellow card) 62'; Valjent (yellow card) 64'; Sedlar (yellow card) 84'	Report	Navas (yellow card) 15'; Diego Carlos 20'; Fernando (yellow card) 33'; Banega 63' (pen.); Reguilón (yellow card) 84'	Stadium: Son Moix; Attendance: 14,321; Referee: Jesús Gil Manzano

3 January 2020 19	Sevilla	1–1	Athletic Bilbao	Seville
21:00 CET (UTC+1)	Carriço (yellow card) 31'; Núñez 60' (o.g.); Ocampos (yellow card) 77'	Report	Capa 15', (yellow card) 71'; López (yellow card) 84'; Núñez (yellow card) 85'; Martínez (yellow card) 87'	Stadium: Ramón Sánchez Pizjuán; Attendance: 37,972; Referee: José Luis González González

18 January 2020 20	Real Madrid	2–1	Sevilla	Madrid
16:00 CET (UTC+1)	Modrić (yellow card) 37'; Casemiro 57', 69', (yellow card) 88'; Carvajal (yellow card) 87'	Report	Banega (yellow card) 54'; De Jong 64'	Stadium: Santiago Bernabéu; Attendance: 72,512; Referee: Juan Martínez Munuera

25 January 2020 21	Sevilla	2–0	Granada	Seville
21:00 CET (UTC+1)	De Jong 11'; Vázquez (yellow card) 13'; Diego Carlos (yellow card) 14'; Fernando (yellow card) 25'; Nolito 34'; Gómez (yellow card) 82'	Report	Puertas (yellow card) 31'	Stadium: Ramón Sánchez Pizjuán; Attendance: 33,533; Referee: Alejandro Hernández Hernández

2 February 2020 22	Sevilla	1–1	Alavés	Seville
18:30 CET (UTC+1)	Reguilón (yellow card) 48'; Ocampos 77' (pen.); Vázquez (yellow card) 81'	Report	Laguardia (yellow card) 64'; Joselu 70'	Stadium: Ramón Sánchez Pizjuán; Attendance: 36,286; Referee: Carlos del Cerro Grande

9 February 2020 23	Celta Vigo	2–1	Sevilla	Vigo
18:30 CET (UTC+1)	Murillo (yellow card) 51'; Aspas 78'; Mallo (yellow card) 79'; Smolov (yellow card) 80'; Sisto 90+1'	Report	En-Nesyri 23'; Diego Carlos (yellow card) 63'; Escudero (yellow card) 90+4'	Stadium: Abanca-Balaídos; Attendance: 20,375; Referee: Santiago Jaime Latre

16 February 2020 24	Sevilla	2–2	Espanyol	Seville
12:00 CET (UTC+1)	Ocampos 15'; Gómez (yellow card) 33'; Gudelj (yellow card) 58'; Suso 80'	Report	Embarba 35'; Wu Lei (yellow card) 38', (goal) 50'; Sánchez (yellow card) 49' (yellow-red card) 69'; Roca (yellow card) 84'	Stadium: Ramón Sánchez Pizjuán; Attendance: 35,661; Referee: Adrián Cordero Vega

23 February 2020 25	Getafe	0–3	Sevilla	Getafe
12:00 CET (UTC+1)	Cucurella (yellow card) 31'; Etebo (yellow card) 34'; Nyom (yellow card) 35'; Molina (yellow card) 59'; Djené (yellow card) 62'; Chema (yellow card) 86'; Maksimović (yellow card) 90+2'	Report	Jordan (yellow card) 31'; Reguilón (yellow card) 35'; Ocampos 43'; Koundé (yellow card) 56', (goal) 75'; Fernando 67'; Navas (yellow card) 90+3'	Stadium: Coliseum Alfonso Pérez; Attendance: 13,438; Referee: Xavier Estrada Fernández

1 March 2020 26	Sevilla	3–2	Osasuna	Seville
12:00 CET (UTC+1)	En-Nesyri 13', 90+3'; Fernando (yellow card) 15'; Ocampos 45+1'; Óliver (yellow card) 84'	Report	Herrera (red card) 54'; Aridane 64'; Torres 74' (pen.); Gallego (yellow card) 76'; Brašanac (yellow card) 85'	Stadium: Ramón Sánchez Pizjuán; Attendance: 31,382; Referee: Carlos del Cerro Grande

7 March 2020 27	Atlético Madrid	2–2	Sevilla	Madrid
16:00 CET (UTC+1)	Morata 32' (pen.); Félix 36', (yellow card) 73'; Trippier (yellow card) 77'	Report	De Jong 19'; Diego Carlos (yellow card) 31'; Navas (yellow card) 43'; Ocampos 43' (pen.); Banega (yellow card) 45+1'; Gudelj (yellow card) 56'	Stadium: Wanda Metropolitano; Attendance: 60,374; Referee: Alejandro Hernández Hernández

11 June 2020 28	Sevilla	2–0	Real Betis	Seville
22:00 CEST (UTC+2)	Ocampos 56' (pen.); Fernando 62'	Report	Emerson (yellow card) 49'; Bartra (yellow card) 54'	Stadium: Ramón Sánchez Pizjuán; Attendance: 0 Referee: Antonio Mateu Lahoz
Note: The match was originally scheduled for 15 March, but was postponed due to the COVID-19 pandemic, and rescheduled to 11 June. It was played behind closed doors.

15 June 2020 29	Levante	1–1	Sevilla	La Nucia
19:30 CEST (UTC+2)	Rochina (yellow card) 52'; Diego Carlos 87' (o.g.)	Report	De Jong 46'; Jordán (yellow card) 60'	Stadium: Camilo Cano (Note: Due to on-going renovations of the Estadi Ciutat de València, Levante played their remaining home matches of the season at the Estadi Olímpic Camilo Cano.); Attendance: 0 Referee: Alejandro Hernández Hernández
Note: The match was originally scheduled for 22 March, but was postponed due to the 2020 coronavirus pandemic, and rescheduled to 15 June. It was played behind closed doors.

19 June 2020 30	Sevilla	0–0	Barcelona	Seville
22:00 CEST (UTC+2)	Reguilón (yellow card) 26'; Fernando (yellow card) 45+4'; Banega (yellow card) 62'	Report	Piqué (yellow card) 39'; Busquets (yellow card) 45+4'	Stadium: Ramón Sánchez Pizjuán; Attendance: 0 Referee: José Luis González González
Note: The match was originally scheduled for 5 April, but was postponed due to the 2020 coronavirus pandemic, and rescheduled to 19 June. It was played behind closed doors.

22 June 2020 31	Villarreal	2–2	Sevilla	Villarreal
19:30 CEST (UTC+2)	Alcácer 18'; Moreno (yellow card) 27'; Torres 45+4'; Trigueros (yellow card) 73'; Soriano (yellow card) 90+3'	Report	Gómez (yellow card) 27'; Escudero 39'; Fernando (yellow card) 45+3'; Munir 63'; Ocampos (yellow card) 68'	Stadium: Estadio de la Cerámica; Attendance: 0 Referee: José María Sánchez Martínez
Note: The match was originally scheduled for 12 April, but was postponed due to the 2020 coronavirus pandemic, and rescheduled to 22 June. It was played behind closed doors.

26 June 2020 32	Sevilla	1–1	Valladolid	Seville
22:00 CEST (UTC+2)	Fernando (yellow card) 12'; Koundé (yellow card) 58'; Vázquez (yellow card) 60'; Ocampos 83' (pen.)	Report	Kiko 25'; Hervías (yellow card) 71'; Sánchez (yellow card) 82'	Stadium: Ramón Sánchez Pizjuán; Attendance: 0 Referee: Valentín Pizarro Gómez
Note: The match was originally scheduled for 22 April, but was postponed due to the 2020 coronavirus pandemic, and rescheduled to 26 June. It was played behind closed doors.

30 June 2020 33	Leganés	0–3	Sevilla	Leganés
21:00 CEST (UTC+2)	Amadou (yellow card) 17'; Mesa (yellow card) 52'; Rosales (yellow card) 75'; Manu (yellow card) 86'	Report	Óliver 23', 35'; Koundé (yellow card) 54'; Gudelj (yellow card) 56'; Jordán (yellow card) 68'; Munir 82'	Stadium: Butarque; Attendance: 0 Referee: César Soto Grado
Note: The match was originally scheduled for 26 April, but was postponed due to the 2020 coronavirus pandemic, and rescheduled to 30 June. It was played behind closed doors.

6 July 2020 34	Sevilla	1–0	Eibar	Seville
22:00 CEST (UTC+2)	Gómez (yellow card) 14'; Ocampos 56'; Banega (yellow card) 90+1'	Report	Álvarez (yellow card) 37'	Stadium: Ramón Sánchez Pizjuán; Attendance: 0 Referee: Antonio Mateu Lahoz
Note: The match was originally scheduled for 3 May, but was postponed due to the 2020 coronavirus pandemic, and rescheduled to 6 July. It was played behind closed doors.

9 July 2020 35	Athletic Bilbao	1–2	Sevilla	Bilbao
22:00 CEST (UTC+2)	Capa 28'; Núñez (yellow card) 31'; De Marcos (yellow card) 68'; D. García (yellow card) 90+3'	Report	Banega (yellow card) 44', (goal) 70'; Ocampos (yellow card) 65'; Munir 74'	Stadium: San Mamés; Attendance: 0 Referee: David Medié Jiménez
Note: The match was originally scheduled for 10 May, but was postponed due to the 2020 coronavirus pandemic, and rescheduled to 9 July. It was played behind closed doors.

12 July 2020 36	Sevilla	2–0	Mallorca	Seville
22:00 CEST (UTC+2)	Ocampos 41' (pen.); Jordán (yellow card) 44'; Bounou (yellow card) 65'; En-Nesyri (yellow card) 83', (goal) 84'	Report	Budimir (yellow card) 36'; Gámez (yellow card) 53'	Stadium: Ramón Sánchez Pizjuán; Attendance: 0 Referee: Adrián Cordero Vega
Note: The match was originally scheduled for 13 May, but was postponed due to the 2020 coronavirus pandemic, and rescheduled to 12 July. It was played behind closed doors.

16 July 2020 37	Real Sociedad	0–0	Sevilla	San Sebastián
21:00 CEST (UTC+2)	Barrenetxea (yellow card) 90+6'	Report	Koundé (yellow card) 45+1'; Banega (yellow card) 90+1'	Stadium: Anoeta Stadium; Attendance: 0 Referee: Carlos del Cerro Grande
Note: The match was originally scheduled for 17 May, but was postponed due to the 2020 coronavirus pandemic, and rescheduled to 16 July. It was played behind closed doors.

19 July 2020 38	Sevilla	1–0	Valencia	Seville
21:00 CEST (UTC+2)	Reguilón 55'	Report	Soler (yellow card) 52'	Stadium: Ramón Sánchez Pizjuán; Attendance: 0 Referee: José Luis González González
Note: The match was originally scheduled for 24 May, but was postponed due to the 2020 coronavirus pandemic, and rescheduled to 19 July. It was played behind closed doors.

=== Copa del Rey ===
On 29 April 2019, the assembly of the Royal Spanish Football Federation approved the new competition format, expanding the competition and changing all rounds to a single-match format until the semifinals. All La Liga teams, except the four participants in the Supercopa de España, entered in the first round.

18 December 2019 First round	Bergantiños	0–1	Sevilla	A Coruña (Note: Bergantiños played at Riazor instead of their regular stadium As Eiroas, in Carballo, as it does not meet the requirements established by the Royal Spanish Football Federation.)
21:00 CET (UTC+1)	Diego (yellow card) 41'	Report	Koundé 16'; Ocampos (yellow card) 27'; Hernández (yellow card) 72'	Stadium: Riazor; Attendance: 3,667; Referee: Pablo González Fuertes

12 January 2020 Second round	Escobedo	0–5	Sevilla	Escobedo
12:00 CET (UTC+1)	Dani (yellow card) 51'; Tirado (yellow card) 62'	Report	De Jong 17'; Nolito 38'; Gudelj (yellow card) 40'; Ocampos 57'; Vázquez 75'; Reguilón (yellow card) 87'; Óliver 90+1'	Stadium: Estadio Eusebio Arce; Attendance: 1,400; Referee: César Soto Grado

21 January 2020 Round of 32	Sevilla	3–1	Levante	Seville
21:00 CET (UTC+1)	Fernando 13', (yellow card) 38'; Ocampos 46'; Nolito (yellow card) 61'; Banega (yellow card) 71'; Óliver 78'; Gómez (yellow card) 81'	Report	Duarte 31'; Rochina (yellow card) 32'	Stadium: Ramón Sánchez Pizjuán; Attendance: 28,104; Referee: José María Sánchez Martínez

30 January 2020 Round of 16	Mirandés	3–1	Sevilla	Miranda de Ebro
21:00 CET (UTC+1)	Matheus 7', 30', (yellow card) 55'; A. González (yellow card) 33'; Sánchez (yellow card) 78'; S. González (yellow card) 80'; Rey 85'	Report	Munir (yellow card) 37'; Diego Carlos (yellow card) 53'; Escudero (yellow card) 76'; Nolito 90', (yellow card) 90+1'	Stadium: Anduva; Attendance: 4,500; Referee: Santiago Jaime Latre

=== UEFA Europa League ===
During the prior season, Sevilla finished sixth in La Liga. Since the winners of the Copa del Rey, Valencia, also qualified for European competition based on league position, the spot awarded to the cup winners (Europa League group stage) was passed to the sixth-placed team.

==== Group stage ====
Pos	Team	Pld	W	D	L	GF	GA	GD	Pts	Qualification	SEV	APO	QRB	DUD
1	(Spain) Sevilla	6	5	0	1	14	3	+11	15	Advance to knockout phase	—	1–0	2–0	3–0
2	(Cyprus) APOEL	6	3	1	2	10	8	+2	10	Advance to knockout phase	1–0	—	2–1	3–4
3	(Azerbaijan) Qarabağ	6	1	2	3	8	11	−3	5		0–3	2–2	—	1–1
4	(Luxembourg) F91 Dudelange	6	1	1	4	8	18	−10	4		2–5	0–2	1–4	—

Source: UEFA
Rules for classification: Group stage tiebreakers

19 September 2019 1	Qarabağ (Azerbaijan)	0–3	(Spain) Sevilla	Baku, Azerbaijan
18:55 CEST (UTC+2)	Ailton (yellow card) 36'; Medvedev (yellow card) 73'	Report	Hernández 62'; Munir 78'; Torres 85'; Gudelj (yellow card) 90+2'	Stadium: Tofiq Bahramov Republican Stadium; Attendance: 30,826; Referee: Yevhen Aranovskyi (Ukraine)

3 October 2019 2	Sevilla (Spain)	1–0	(Cyprus) APOEL	Seville, Spain
21:00 CEST (UTC+2)	Hernández 17'; Vázquez (yellow card) 77'	Report	Jakoliš (yellow card) 65'	Stadium: Ramón Sánchez Pizjuán; Attendance: 30,008; Referee: Bas Nijhuis (Netherlands)

24 October 2019 3	Sevilla (Spain)	3–0	(Luxembourg) F91 Dudelange	Seville, Spain
21:00 CEST (UTC+2)	Vázquez 48', 75'; Pozo (yellow card) 66'; Munir 78'	Report	Lesquoy (yellow card) 25'	Stadium: Ramón Sánchez Pizjuán; Attendance: 26,165; Referee: Anastasios Papapetrou (Greece)

7 November 2019 4	F91 Dudelange (Luxembourg)	2–5	(Spain) Sevilla	Luxembourg City, Luxembourg
18:55 CET (UTC+1)	Cools (yellow card) 32'; Sinani 69', 80'	Report	Dabbur 18', 36'; Munir 27', 33', 67'; Jordán (yellow card) 56'	Stadium: Stade Josy Barthel (Note: F91 Dudelange played their home matches at Stade Josy Barthel, Luxembourg City, instead of their regular home stadium Stade Jos Nosbaum, Dudelange.); Attendance: 2,848; Referee: Vilhjálmur Thórarinsson (Iceland)

28 November 2019 5	Sevilla (Spain)	2–0	(Azerbaijan) Qarabağ	Seville, Spain
21:00 CET (UTC+1)	Gil 61'; Dabbur 90+2'	Report		Stadium: Ramón Sánchez Pizjuán; Attendance: 19,803; Referee: Mohammed Al-Hakim (Sweden)

12 December 2019 6	APOEL (Cyprus)	1–0	(Spain) Sevilla	Strovolos, Cyprus
18:55 CET (UTC+1)	Ioannou (yellow card) 54'; Savić 61', (yellow card) 63'; Alef (yellow card) 74'	Report	Gudelj (yellow card) 48'; Lopes (yellow card) 52'; Escudero (yellow card) 52'; Ocampos (yellow card) 76'	Stadium: GSP Stadium; Attendance: 5,608; Referee: Nikola Dabanović (Montenegro)

==== Knockout phase ====
20 February 2020 R32 First leg	CFR Cluj (Romania)	1–1	(Spain) Sevilla	Cluj-Napoca, Romania
18:55 CET (UTC+1)	Deac 59' (pen.)	Report	Fernando (yellow card) 44'; Reguilón (yellow card) 74'; En-Nesyri 82'	Stadium: Stadionul Dr. Constantin Rădulescu; Attendance: 14,820; Referee: Deniz Aytekin (Germany)

27 February 2020 R32 Second leg	Sevilla (Spain)	0–0 (1–1 (a) agg.)	(Romania) CFR Cluj	Seville, Spain
21:00 CET (UTC+1)	Navas (yellow card) 44'; Ocampos (yellow card) 88'; En-Nesyri (yellow card) 90+2'	Report	Deac (yellow card) 59'; Đoković (yellow card) 73'; Bordeianu (yellow card) 74' (yellow-red card) 90+1'; Boli (yellow card) 85'	Stadium: Ramón Sánchez Pizjuán; Attendance: 31,338; Referee: Andris Treimanis (Latvia)

6 August 2020 Round of 16	Sevilla (Spain)	2–0	(Italy) Roma	Duisburg, Germany
18:55 CEST (UTC+2)	Reguilón 22'; En-Nesyri 44'; Diego Carlos (yellow card) 61'; Jordán (yellow card) 90+2'	Report	Kolarov (yellow card) 45+3'; Pellegrini (yellow card) 86'; Mancini (red card) 90+10'	Stadium: MSV-Arena; Attendance: 0 Referee: Björn Kuipers (Netherlands)
Note: The match between Sevilla and Roma in Seville was meant to be played behind closed doors due to an outbreak of COVID-19 in Spain. However, on 11 March the match was indefinitely postponed from its original date of 12 March due to a pandemic of COVID-19 in Spain and subsequent travel restrictions. On 17 June, the match was rescheduled to 6 August to be played in a single leg at MSV-Arena stadium in Germany.

11 August 2020 Quarter-finals	Wolverhampton Wanderers (England)	0–1	(Spain) Sevilla	Duisburg, Germany
21:00 CEST (UTC+2)	Jiménez (penalty missed) 13'; Saïss (yellow card) 49'; Neves (yellow card) 90+1'	Report	Diego Carlos (yellow card) 12'; Ocampos 88'	Stadium: MSV-Arena; Attendance: 0 Referee: Daniele Orsato (Italy)

16 August 2020 Semi-finals	Sevilla (Spain)	2–1	(England) Manchester United	Cologne, Germany
21:00 CEST (UTC+2)	Diego Carlos (yellow card) 21'; Suso 26'; De Jong 78'; Munir (yellow card) 87'	Report	Fernandes 9' (pen.); Williams (yellow card) 17'; Rashford (yellow card) 67'; Maguire (yellow card) 86'	Stadium: RheinEnergieStadion; Attendance: 0 Referee: Felix Brych (Germany)

21 August 2020 Final	Sevilla (Spain)	3–2	(Italy) Inter Milan	Cologne, Germany
21:00 CEST (UTC+2)	Diego Carlos (yellow card) 4'; De Jong 12', 33'; Banega (yellow card) 45'; Lukaku 74' (o.g.)	Report	Lukaku 5' (pen.); Godín 36'; Barella (yellow card) 41'; Bastoni (yellow card) 55'; Gagliardini (yellow card) 73'	Stadium: RheinEnergieStadion; Attendance: 0 Referee: Danny Makkelie (Netherlands)

== Statistics ==
=== Squad appearances and goals ===
No.	Pos	Nat	Player	Total		La Liga		Europa League		Copa del Rey	
No.	Pos	Nat	Player	Apps	Goals	Apps	Goals	Apps	Goals	Apps	Goals
Goalkeepers
1	GK	(Czech Republic) CZE	Tomáš Vaclík	37	0	33	0	2	0	2	0
13	GK	(Morocco) MAR	Yassine Bounou	18	0	5+1	0	10	0	2	0
31	GK	(Spain) ESP	Javi Díaz	0	0	0	0	0	0	0	0
Defenders
3	DF	(Spain) ESP	Sergi Gómez	21	0	8+5	0	5	0	3	0
12	DF	(France) FRA	Jules Koundé	41	2	26+4	1	9	0	2	1
16	DF	(Spain) ESP	Jesús Navas	47	0	37+1	0	6	0	3	0
18	DF	(Spain) ESP	Sergio Escudero	21	1	8+3	1	7	0	3	0
20	DF	(Brazil) BRA	Diego Carlos	45	2	35	2	7+1	0	2	0
23	DF	(Spain) ESP	Sergio Reguilón	38	3	29+2	2	5	1	1+1	0
36	DF	(Spain) ESP	Genaro	1	0	0	0	1	0	0	0
Midfielders
10	MF	(Argentina) ARG	Éver Banega	43	3	28+5	3	4+3	0	2+1	0
17	MF	(Serbia) SRB	Nemanja Gudelj	38	0	9+15	0	8+2	0	3+1	0
21	MF	(Spain) ESP	Óliver Torres	37	6	21+7	3	4+1	1	4	2
22	MF	(Argentina) ARG	Franco Vázquez	42	6	11+20	3	3+7	2	1	1
24	MF	(Spain) ESP	Joan Jordán	47	2	27+7	2	10	0	2+1	0
25	MF	(Brazil) BRA	Fernando	42	3	30+4	2	6+1	0	1	1
26	MF	(Spain) ESP	José Mena	2	0	0	0	0+2	0	0	0
Forwards
5	FW	(Argentina) ARG	Lucas Ocampos	44	17	31+2	14	7	1	3+1	2
7	FW	(Portugal) POR	Rony Lopes	14	0	2+3	0	5+2	0	0+2	0
11	FW	(Spain) ESP	Munir	32	10	14+7	5	4+5	5	1+1	0
14	FW	(Spain) ESP	Suso	23	2	8+9	1	6	1	0	0
15	FW	(Morocco) MAR	Youssef En-Nesyri	26	6	7+11	4	3+3	2	0+2	0
19	FW	(Netherlands) NED	Luuk de Jong	46	10	24+11	6	4+4	3	3	1
Players who made an appearance this season but left the club
6	DF	(Portugal) POR	Daniel Carriço	12	0	10+1	0	1	0	0	0
8	FW	(Spain) ESP	Nolito	20	5	12+3	3	1+1	0	3	2
9	FW	(Israel) ISR	Mu'nas Dabbur	9	3	0+2	0	3+3	3	1	0
14	FW	(Mexico) MEX	Javier Hernández	15	3	4+5	1	4	2	1+1	0
15	MF	(Spain) ESP	Alejandro Pozo	10	0	0+3	0	6	0	1	0
30	FW	(Spain) ESP	Bryan Gil	7	1	0+2	0	1+3	1	0+1	0

=== Goalscorers ===
Rank	Player	Position	La Liga	Europa League	Copa del Rey	Total
1	(Argentina) Lucas Ocampos	FW	14	1	2	17
2	(Spain) Munir	FW	5	5	0	10
2	(Netherlands) Luuk de Jong	FW	6	3	1	10
4	(Spain) Óliver Torres	MF	3	1	2	6
4	(Argentina) Franco Vázquez	MF	3	2	1	6
4	(Morocco) Youssef En-Nesyri	FW	4	2	0	6
7	(Spain) Nolito	FW	3	0	2	5
8	(Israel) Mu'nas Dabbur	FW	0	3	0	3
8	(Mexico) Javier Hernández	FW	1	2	0	3
8	(Brazil) Fernando	MF	2	0	1	3
8	(Argentina) Éver Banega	MF	3	0	0	3
8	(Spain) Sergio Reguilón	DF	2	1	0	3
13	(Brazil) Diego Carlos	DF	2	0	0	2
13	(Spain) Joan Jordán	MF	2	0	0	2
13	(France) Jules Koundé	DF	1	0	1	2
13	(Spain) Suso	FW	1	1	0	2
16	(Spain) Bryan Gil	FW	0	1	0	1
16	(Spain) Sergio Escudero	DF	1	0	0	1
Own goals			1	1	0	2
Total			54	23	10	87

=== Clean sheets ===
No.	Name	La Liga	Europa League	Copa del Rey	Total	Starts
1	(Czech Republic) Tomáš Vaclík	14	1	0	15	37
13	(Morocco) Yassine Bounou	4	6	2	12	17
TOTALS		18	7	2	27	54

=== Disciplinary record ===
Includes all competitive matches.

N	P	Nat.	Name	La Liga			Europa League			Copa del Rey			Total			Notes
N	P	Nat.	Name	Yellow card	Second yellow card	Red card	Yellow card	Second yellow card	Red card	Yellow card	Second yellow card	Red card	Yellow card	Second yellow card	Red card	Notes
3	DF	(Spain)	Sergi Gómez	4						1			5			
5	FW	(Argentina)	Lucas Ocampos	7	1		1			1			9	1		Ban sustained - 2 Games (La Liga) for infringement of article 117 RFEF Disciplinary Code; Banned on 12 December 2019 - Returned on 21 December 2019
~~6~~	DF	(Portugal)	Daniel Carriço	3									3			
7	FW	(Portugal)	Rony Lopes				1						1			
~~8~~	FW	(Spain)	Nolito				1			2			3			
10	MF	(Argentina)	Éver Banega	10			1			1			12			
11	FW	(Spain)	Munir	1			1			1			3			
12	DF	(France)	Jules Koundé	6									6			
13	GK	(Morocco)	Yassine Bounou	1									1			
~~14~~	FW	(Mexico)	Javier Hernández							1			1			
15	FW	(Morocco)	Youssef En-Nesyri	3			1						4			
~~15~~	MF	(Spain)	Alejandro Pozo				1						1			
16	RB	(Spain)	Jesús Navas	4			1						5			
17	DM	(Serbia)	Nemanja Gudelj	6			2			1			9			
18	LB	(Spain)	Sergio Escudero	2			1			1			4			
19	FW	(Netherlands)	Luuk de Jong	2									2			
20	DF	(Brazil)	Diego Carlos	7			4			1			12			
21	MF	(Spain)	Óliver Torres	5									5			
22	MF	(Argentina)	Franco Vázquez	5			1						6			
23	DF	(Spain)	Sergio Reguilón	8			1			1			10			
24	MF	(Spain)	Joan Jordán	8			2						10			
25	MF	(Brazil)	Fernando	13			1			1			15			
~~30~~	FW	(Spain)	Bryan Gil	2									2			

Last updated: 21 August 2020
Source: ESPNFC.com
Only competitive matches
(yellow card) = Number of bookings; (second yellow card) = Number of sending offs after a second yellow card; (red card) = Number of sending offs by a direct red card.
