= Pepe Mena =

Spanish footballer

Personal information
- Full name: José Mena Rodríguez
- Date of birth: 15 May 1998 (age 28)
- Place of birth: Utrera, Spain
- Height: 1.73 m (5 ft 8 in)
- Position: Attacking midfielder

Team information
- Current team: Recreativo
- Number: 8

Youth career
- Utrera
- 2006-2017: Sevilla

Senior career*
Years	Team	Apps	(Gls)
2017–2018	Sevilla C	1	(0)
2017–2020	Sevilla B	79	(14)
2018–2020	Sevilla	0	(0)
2020–2021	Baník Ostrava	10	(0)
2021–2023	Algeciras	57	(5)
2023	Linares	15	(1)
2024	Antequera	12	(1)
2024–2025	Tarazona	30	(0)
2025–	Recreativo	31	(1)
- * Club domestic league appearances and goals as of 7 May 2026

José Mena Rodríguez (born 15 May 1998), commonly known as Pepe Mena, is a Spanish footballer who plays for Segunda Federación club Recreativo as an attacking midfielder.

== Club career ==
Born in Utrera, Seville, Andalusia, Mena finished his formation with Sevilla FC. On 20 March 2017, he renewed his contract until 2019.

On 14 May 2017, without even appearing for the reserves, Mena was an unused substitute for the main squad in a 1–4 La Liga away loss against Real Madrid. Ahead of the 2017–18 season, he was promoted to the B-side in Segunda División.

Mena made his professional debut on 19 August 2017, coming on as a late substitute for Yan Brice in a 1–1 away draw against CA Osasuna. He scored his first goal the following 25 March, netting the game's only in an away defeat of Real Zaragoza.

Mena made his first-team debut on 1 November 2018, replacing fellow youth graduate Borja Lasso in a 0–0 away draw against CF Villanovense, for the season's Copa del Rey. On 28 November of the following year, he made his European debut by coming on for Óliver Torres in the 68th minute of a 2–0 home win against Qarabağ FK, for the 2019–20 UEFA Europa League.

On 5 October 2020, Mena moved abroad after agreeing to a contract with Czech First League side FC Baník Ostrava.

== Career statistics ==
As of 9 November 2020

Appearances and goals by club, season and competition
Club	Season	League			Cup		Europe		Other		Total	
Club	Season	Division	Apps	Goals	Apps	Goals	Apps	Goals	Apps	Goals	Apps	Goals
Sevilla	2018–19	La Liga	0	0	1	0	0	0	1	0	1	0
Sevilla	2019–20	La Liga	0	0	0	0	2	0	1	0	2	0
Sevilla	Total		0	0	1	0	2	0	2	0	3	0
Baník Ostrava	2020–21	Fortuna Liga	1	0	0	0	0	0	1	1	2	1
Baník Ostrava	Total		1	0	0	0	0	0	1	1	2	1
Career total			1	0	1	0	2	0	3	1	5	1

== Honours ==
=== Club ===
Sevilla

- UEFA Europa League: 2019–20
