= Ramón Vázquez García =

Spanish footballer (born 1964)

Ramón
Personal information
- Full name: Ramón Vázquez García
- Date of birth: 14 February 1964 (age 62)
- Place of birth: Alcalá de Guadaíra, Spain
- Height: 1.83 m (6 ft 0 in)
- Position: Forward

Youth career
- Sevilla

Senior career*
Years	Team	Apps	(Gls)
1982–1983	Sevilla Atlético		
1983–1992	Sevilla	215	(45)
1985–1986	→ Recreativo (loan)	38	(12)
1992–1993	Deportivo La Coruña	0	(0)
1993–1994	Albacete	17	(0)

International career
1980–1982	Spain U18	8	(0)
1986	Spain U21	1	(0)
1987–1988	Spain U23	5	(4)
1987–1988	Spain	3	(1)
- * Club domestic league appearances and goals

Ramón Vázquez García (born 14 February 1964), commonly known as Ramón, is a former Spanish footballer who played as a forward.

== Club career ==
Ramón began his career at Sevilla, initially playing for the club's B team, Sevilla Atlético. On 17 March 1983, Ramón scored 13 minutes into his debut, in a 3–2 away win against Salamanca. In 1985, after struggling for game time at Sevilla, Ramón was loaned to Recreativo for a season. Ramón played every league game for Recreativo in the 1985–86 Segunda División, scoring twelve times. Upon his return to Sevilla, Ramón became a regular, playing 40 games in the following season. Ramón remained with Sevilla until 1992, when he was released from the club after failing to agree a new contract. In 1992, Ramón signed for Deportivo La Coruña, however failed to make an appearance for the club due to injury problems. In 1993, Ramón signed for Albacete, making 17 appearances, all as a substitute. Ramón retired from football at the end of the 1992–93 season.

== International career ==
In the early 1980s, Ramón represented Spain's under-18's in the Principato di Monaco and the Coppa Principe Alberto. After representing Spain at under-21's, Ramón represented the under-23 side during qualification for the 1988 Summer Olympics. On 21 January 1987, Ramón made his debut for Spain, in a 1–1 draw against the Netherlands.

=== International goals ===
Scores and results list Spain's goal tally first.

#	Date	Venue	Opponent	Score	Result	Competition
1	18 February 1987	Santiago Bernabéu, Madrid, Spain	England	2–4	2–4	Friendly

== Personal life ==
Ramón's son Javi is also a professional footballer.
