= Javi Vázquez (footballer, born 2000) =

Spanish footballer

Personal information
- Full name: Javier María Vázquez López
- Date of birth: 24 September 2000 (age 26)
- Place of birth: Alcalá de Guadaíra, Spain
- Height: 1.78 m (5 ft 10 in)
- Position: Left back

Team information
- Current team: Torreense
- Number: 23

Youth career
- Sevilla

Senior career*
Years	Team	Apps	(Gls)
2018	Sevilla C	2	(1)
2018–2021	Sevilla B	48	(3)
2018	Sevilla	0	(0)
2021–2023	Ibiza	43	(1)
2022	→ Racing Santander (loan)	8	(1)
2023–2024	Lugo	26	(0)
2024–	Torreense	67	(8)

International career
2019	Spain U19	1	(0)
- * Club domestic league appearances and goals as of 18 May 2026

Javier María Vázquez López (born 24 September 2000), known as Javi Vázquez, is a Spanish professional footballer who plays as a left back for Portuguese side Torreense.

== Club career ==
Born in Alcalá de Guadaíra, Seville, Andalusia, Vázquez represented Sevilla FC as a youth. He made his senior debut with the C-team on 15 April 2018, starting and scoring the opener in a 2–0 Tercera División home win against Atlético Onubense.

On 6 May 2018, aged only 17, Vázquez made his professional debut with the reserves by starting in a 0–1 away loss against CD Lugo in the Segunda División. He made his first-team debut on 1 November, starting in a 0–0 away draw against CF Villanovense, for the season's Copa del Rey.

On 15 January 2021, Vázquez was transferred to Segunda División B side UD Ibiza, and helped in their first-ever promotion to the second tier at the end of the season. On 30 January 2022, after being rarely used, he was loaned to Racing de Santander in Primera División RFEF until June.

== Personal life ==
Vázquez's father Ramón was also a footballer. A forward, he was also groomed at Sevilla. His older brother Ramón works as an analyst for Sevilla, while his younger brother Manolo plays as a midfielder for Sevilla's youth A team.

== Career statistics ==
As of 1 November 2018

Appearances and goals by club, season and competition
Club	Season	League			Copa del Rey		Europe		Other		Total	
Club	Season	Division	Apps	Goals	Apps	Goals	Apps	Goals	Apps	Goals	Apps	Goals
Sevilla	2018–19	La Liga	0	0	1	0	0	0	0	0	1	0
Career total			0	0	1	0	0	0	0	0	1	0

== Honours ==
Torreense

- Taça de Portugal: 2025–26
