= Sergi Gómez =

Spanish footballer

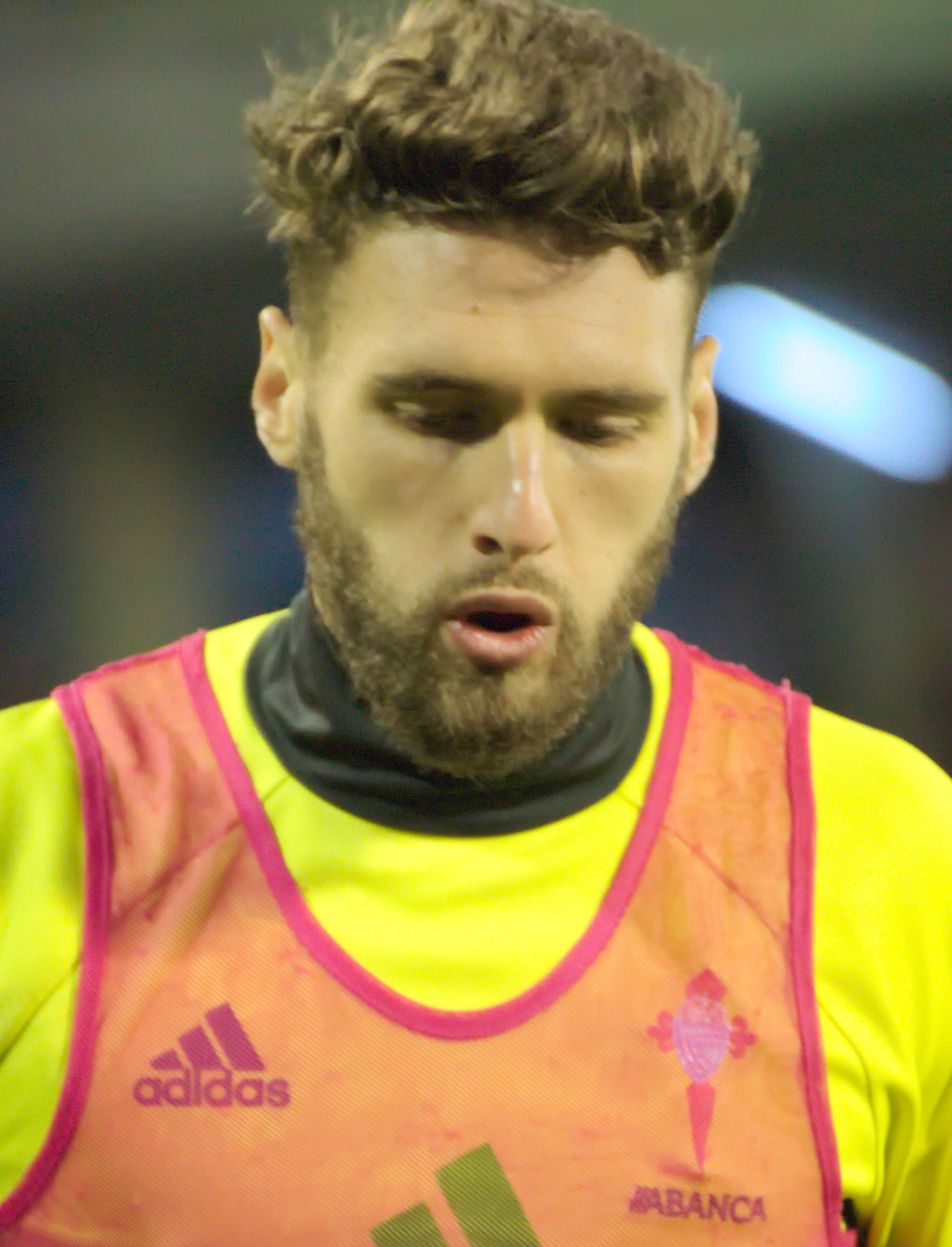
- Gómez warming up for Celta in 2017

Personal information
- Full name: Sergi Gómez Solà
- Date of birth: 28 March 1992 (age 34)
- Place of birth: Arenys de Mar, Spain
- Height: 1.85 m (6 ft 1 in)
- Position: Centre-back

Team information
- Current team: Alverca
- Number: 5

Youth career
- 1998–2004: Canet de Mar
- 2004–2006: Mataró
- 2006–2011: Barcelona

Senior career*
| Years | Team | Apps | (Gls) |
| 2010–2014 | Barcelona B | 96 | (3) |
| 2010 | Barcelona | 0 | (0) |
| 2014–2018 | Celta | 111 | (1) |
| 2018–2021 | Sevilla | 54 | (0) |
| 2021–2025 | Espanyol | 106 | (2) |
| 2025– | Alverca | 35 | (0) |

International career
| 2008–2009 | Spain U17 | 15 | (1) |
| 2010 | Spain U18 | 2 | (0) |
| 2010–2011 | Spain U19 | 13 | (0) |
| 2013–2014 | Spain U21 | 9 | (0) |
| 2014–2022 | Catalonia | 3 | (0) |
- * Club domestic league appearances and goals as of 19:56, 24 October 2026 (UTC)

Sergi Gómez Solà (born 28 March 1992) is a Spanish professional footballer who plays as a central defender for Primeira Liga club Alverca, where he is captain.

== Club career ==
=== Barcelona ===
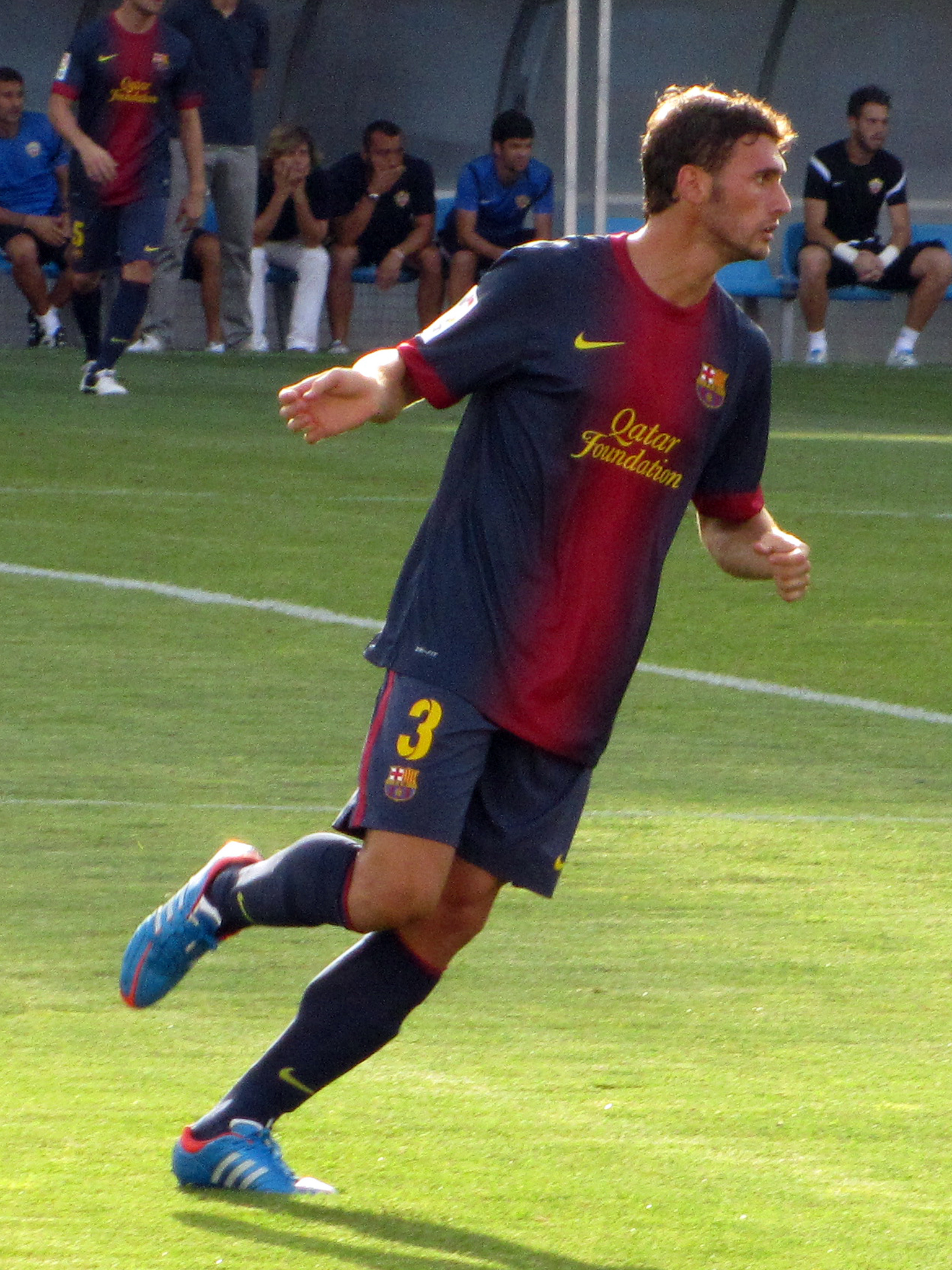
Gómez in action for Barcelona B

Born in Arenys de Mar, Barcelona, Catalonia, Gómez arrived in FC Barcelona's youth academy at the age of 14. Even though he appeared in only three Segunda División B games for the B side in the 2009–10 season, he would later play an essential role in their Segunda División successful promotion play-offs, after injury to fellow youth graduate Andreu Fontàs.

On 13 August 2010, as first-team manager Pep Guardiola provided Barça's Spanish internationals with needed rest, Gómez was included in the 19-man squad to face Sevilla FC in the first leg of the 2010 edition of the Supercopa de España. He made his competitive debut in that match, playing 90 minutes in a 3–1 away loss.

Gómez was exclusively associated to the youth teams and the reserves during his spell at the Camp Nou, however.

=== Celta ===
On 1 July 2014, free agent Gómez signed a three-year contract with RC Celta de Vigo. He made his La Liga debut on 13 September when he came as a 75th-minute substitute in a 2–2 home draw against Real Sociedad, and he finished his first season with 22 appearances to help to a final eighth position.

Gómez scored his first goal in the top flight on 5 November 2017, opening an eventual 3–1 win over Athletic Bilbao also at Balaídos.

=== Sevilla ===
Gómez joined Sevilla FC on 23 July 2018, on a four-year deal. An undisputed starter under Pablo Machín, he was deemed surplus to requirements after the appointment of Julen Lopetegui.

=== Espanyol ===
On 28 July 2021, Gómez signed a three-year contract with RCD Espanyol, newly promoted to the top tier. He was first choice in his first three seasons as well as captain, being relegated in 2022–23 – and sent off in losses to Rayo Vallecano (2–0) and Girona FC (2–1)– but achieving promotion in 2023–24.

=== Later career ===
Gómez moved abroad for the first time in his career in summer 2025, with the 33-year-old joining F.C. Alverca, newly promoted to the Portuguese Primeira Liga, on a two-year deal.

== International career ==
After representing Spain at under-17, under-19 and under-21 levels, Gómez was called up to the full side by manager Luis Enrique on 15 March 2019, for two UEFA Euro 2020 qualifying matches against Norway and Malta.

== Career statistics ==
As of 28 May 2023

Appearances and goals by club, season and competition
| Club | Season | League | | | Cup | | Europe | | Other | | Total | |
| Club | Season | Division | Apps | Goals | Apps | Goals | Apps | Goals | Apps | Goals | Apps | Goals |
|---|---|---|---|---|---|---|---|---|---|---|---|---|
| Barcelona B | 2009–10 | Segunda División B | 3 | 1 | — | | — | | 6 (Note: Appearances in Segunda División B play-offs) | 0 | 9 | 1 |
| Barcelona B | 2010–11 | Segunda División | 9 | 0 | — | | — | | — | | 9 | 0 |
| Barcelona B | 2011–12 | Segunda División | 21 | 0 | — | | — | | — | | 21 | 0 |
| Barcelona B | 2012–13 | Segunda División | 21 | 2 | — | | — | | — | | 21 | 2 |
| Barcelona B | 2013–14 | Segunda División | 36 | 0 | — | | — | | — | | 36 | 0 |
| Barcelona B | Total | | 90 | 3 | 0 | 0 | 0 | 0 | 6 | 0 | 96 | 3 |
| Barcelona | 2010–11 | La Liga | 0 | 0 | 0 | 0 | 0 | 0 | 1 (Note: Appearance in Supercopa de España) | 0 | 1 | 0 |
| Celta | 2014–15 | La Liga | 22 | 0 | 4 | 0 | — | | — | | 26 | 0 |
| Celta | 2015–16 | La Liga | 31 | 0 | 6 | 0 | — | | — | | 37 | 0 |
| Celta | 2016–17 | La Liga | 25 | 0 | 6 | 1 | 5 (Note: Appearances in UEFA Europa League) | 0 | — | | 36 | 1 |
| Celta | 2017–18 | La Liga | 33 | 1 | 2 | 0 | — | | — | | 35 | 1 |
| Celta | Total | | 111 | 1 | 18 | 1 | 5 | 0 | — | | 134 | 2 |
| Sevilla | 2018–19 | La Liga | 32 | 0 | 2 | 0 | 13 | 0 | 1 | 0 | 48 | 0 |
| Sevilla | 2019–20 | La Liga | 13 | 0 | 3 | 0 | 5 | 0 | — | | 21 | 0 |
| Sevilla | 2020–21 | La Liga | 9 | 0 | 4 | 0 | 3 (Note: Appearances in UEFA Champions League) | 0 | 0 | 0 | 16 | 0 |
| Sevilla | Total | | 54 | 0 | 9 | 0 | 21 | 0 | 1 | 0 | 85 | 0 |
| Espanyol | 2021–22 | La Liga | 31 | 1 | 4 | 1 | — | | — | | 35 | 2 |
| Espanyol | 2022–23 | La Liga | 29 | 0 | 1 | 0 | — | | — | | 30 | 0 |
| Espanyol | Total | | 60 | 1 | 5 | 1 | — | | — | | 65 | 2 |
| Career total | | | 315 | 5 | 32 | 2 | 26 | 0 | 8 | 0 | 381 | 7 |

== Honours ==
Barcelona

- Supercopa de España: 2010

Sevilla

- UEFA Europa League: 2019–20

Spain U19

- UEFA European Under-19 Championship: 2011

Spain U17

- FIFA U-17 World Cup third place: 2009
