= Sergio Escudero (footballer, born 1989) =

Spanish footballer

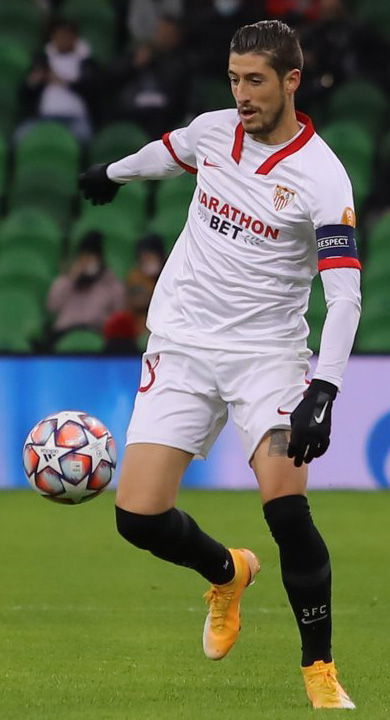
- Escudero with Sevilla in 2020

Personal information
- Full name: Sergio Escudero Palomo
- Date of birth: 2 September 1989 (age 37)
- Place of birth: Valladolid, Spain
- Height: 1.76 m (5 ft 9 in)
- Position: Left-back

Team information
- Current team: Zaragoza

Youth career
- 1998–2004: Valladolid
- 2004–2005: Parquesol
- 2005–2007: Betis Valladolid
- 2007–2008: Murcia

Senior career*
Years	Team	Apps	(Gls)
2008–2009	Murcia B	24	(1)
2009–2010	Murcia	26	(1)
2010–2013	Schalke 04 II	10	(2)
2010–2013	Schalke 04	12	(0)
2013	→ Getafe (loan)	9	(1)
2013–2015	Getafe	49	(4)
2015–2021	Sevilla	109	(3)
2021–2022	Granada	27	(2)
2022–2024	Valladolid	58	(4)
2024–2026	Deportivo La Coruña	35	(1)
2026–	Zaragoza	0	(0)
- * Club domestic league appearances and goals as of 31 May 2026

Sergio Escudero Palomo (born 2 September 1989) is a Spanish professional footballer who plays as a left-back for Primera Federación club Real Zaragoza.

He made 217 La Liga appearances for Getafe, Sevilla, Granada and Valladolid, winning the Europa League twice with the second of those teams. Abroad, he had a spell in Germany's Bundesliga with Schalke 04, and lifted the DFB-Pokal in 2011.

== Club career ==
=== Murcia ===
Born in Valladolid, Castile and León, Escudero joined Real Murcia CF in 2007 after a six-year youth spell at local Real Valladolid, spending his first season as a senior with the reserves in the Segunda División B. On 13 June 2009, he made his debut with the first team, playing the full 90 minutes in a 2–1 home win against UD Salamanca as the hosts had already retained their Segunda División status.

Escudero was definitely promoted to the main squad for the 2009–10 campaign, being the most utilised player in his position (2,250 minutes) as Murcia were eventually relegated after ranking in 20th position. In late March 2010, interest surfaced from Real Madrid, but nothing came of it.

=== Schalke 04 ===
In the summer of 2010, the 20-year-old Escudero signed with FC Schalke 04 in Germany, alongside compatriots José Manuel Jurado and Raúl González for an undisclosed fee. He made his Bundesliga debut on 26 February 2011, playing 68 minutes in a 1–1 home draw with 1. FC Nürnberg. He finished his first season as a DFB-Pokal winner, coming on as a substitute for Hans Sarpei just before half time in a 5–0 rout of MSV Duisburg in the final on 21 May.

=== Getafe ===
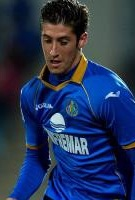
Escudero with Getafe in 2015

Escudero was loaned to Getafe CF in late January 2013, to cover for injured Mané. His maiden appearance in La Liga took place on 2 February, as he started in a 3–1 home victory over Deportivo de La Coruña.

Escudero joined the Madrid outskirts club permanently on 11 July 2013, agreeing to a five-year contract. He scored two goals in his first full season, against FC Barcelona (2–5 home loss) and Sevilla FC (1–0, also at home), the latter all but guaranteeing his team stayed in the top flight for another year.

=== Sevilla ===
On 3 July 2015, Escudero moved to Sevilla in the same league by agreeing to a four-year deal. He scored his first goal for the Andalusians on 29 November, the only in a fixture against Valencia CF at the Ramón Sánchez-Pizjuán Stadium.

Escudero played second-fiddle to Benoît Trémoulinas in his first year, but still managed to play 28 matches in all competitions, including the full 90 minutes of the final of the UEFA Europa League against Liverpool in Basel (3–1 win).

In February 2017, Escudero extended his contract until 2021. In 2019–20 his position was usurped by on-loan Sergio Reguilón; he ended the campaign as a Europa League winner again, unused in the final defeat of Inter Milan.

=== Later career ===
On 31 August 2021, the free agent Escudero signed a one-year contract with Granada CF also in the top tier. The following 13 July 2022, after their relegation, the 32-year-old returned to Valladolid after 18 years on a two-year deal.

On 18 July 2024, Escudero agreed to a two-year contract at Deportivo de La Coruña, newly-promoted to the second division. On 2 July 2026, after helping the club to achieve another promotion, he joined Real Zaragoza in the Primera Federación on a one-year deal.

== International career ==
In November 2016, Escudero received his first call-up to the senior Spain squad for matches against Macedonia and England. He took no part in either game.

== Career statistics ==
As of match played 4 June 2023

Appearances and goals by club, season and competition
Club	Season	League			National cup		Europe		Other		Total	
Club	Season	Division	Apps	Goals	Apps	Goals	Apps	Goals	Apps	Goals	Apps	Goals
Murcia B	2008–09	Segunda División B	24	1	—		—		—		24	1
Murcia	2008–09	Segunda División	1	0	0	0	—		—		1	0
Murcia	2009–10	Segunda División	25	1	3	0	—		—		28	1
Murcia	Total		26	1	3	0	—		—		29	1
Schalke 04 II	2010–11	Regionalliga West	5	1	—		—		—		5	1
Schalke 04 II	2011–12	Regionalliga West	2	1	—		—		—		2	1
Schalke 04 II	2012–13	Regionalliga West	3	0	—		—		—		3	0
Schalke 04 II	Total		10	2	—		—		—		10	2
Schalke 04	2010–11	Bundesliga	6	0	2	0	4 (Note: Appearances in UEFA Champions League)	0	1 (Note: Appearance in DFL-Supercup)	0	13	0
Schalke 04	2011–12	Bundesliga	6	0	0	0	3 (Note: Appearances in UEFA Europa League)	0	—		9	0
Schalke 04	2012–13	Bundesliga	0	0	0	0	0	0	—		0	0
Schalke 04	Total		12	0	2	0	7	0	1	0	22	0
Getafe	2012–13	La Liga	10	1	0	0	—		—		10	1
Getafe	2013–14	La Liga	19	2	1	0	—		—		20	2
Getafe	2014–15	La Liga	30	2	4	0	—		—		34	2
Getafe	Total		59	5	5	0	—		—		64	5
Sevilla	2015–16	La Liga	15	1	6	0	7	0	0	0	28	1
Sevilla	2016–17	La Liga	26	0	2	0	8	1	1 (Note: Appearance in Supercopa de España)	0	37	1
Sevilla	2017–18	La Liga	27	0	6	1	12	2	—		45	3
Sevilla	2018–19	La Liga	21	0	2	0	7	0	1	0	31	0
Sevilla	2019–20	La Liga	11	1	3	0	7	0	—		21	1
Sevilla	2020–21	La Liga	9	1	1	0	3	0	1 (Note: Appearance in UEFA Super Cup)	0	13	1
Sevilla	Total		109	3	20	1	44	3	3	0	176	7
Granada	2021–22	La Liga	27	2	2	0	—		—		29	2
Valladolid	2022–23	La Liga	23	1	1	1	—		—		24	2
Career total			290	15	33	2	51	3	4	0	378	18

== Honours ==
Schalke 04

- DFB-Pokal: 2010–11

Sevilla

- UEFA Europa League: 2015–16, 2019–20
