= Samu Manchón =

Spanish footballer

Personal information
- Full name: Samuel González Martínez
- Date of birth: 17 February 1997 (age 29)
- Place of birth: Almendralejo, Spain
- Height: 1.70 m (5 ft 7 in)
- Position: Attacking midfielder

Team information
- Current team: Gimnástica Segoviana
- Number: 16

Youth career
- CP Almendralejo
- 2013–2016: Real Betis

Senior career*
Years	Team	Apps	(Gls)
2016–2020	Extremadura B	102	(24)
2017–2020	Extremadura	3	(0)
2020–2022	Montijo	52	(7)
2022–2023	Cacereño	34	(6)
2023–2024	Badajoz	29	(5)
2024–2025	Coria	26	(3)
2025–	Gimnástica Segoviana	24	(1)
- * Club domestic league appearances and goals as of 7 May 2026

Samuel González Martínez (born 17 February 1997), known as Samu Manchón, is a Spanish professional footballer who plays for Segunda Federación club Gimnástica Segoviana. Mainly an attacking midfielder, he can also play as a winger or a right back.

== Club career ==
Born in Almendralejo, Extremadura, Manchón joined Real Betis' youth setup in March 2013, from CP Almendralejo. On 23 June 2016, he signed for Extremadura UD and was initially assigned to the reserves in Tercera División.

On 19 November 2017, Manchón made his first-team debut by coming on as a second-half substitute for Jairo Izquierdo in a 0–1 Segunda División B home loss against Real Murcia. He made his professional debut the following 19 August, starting in a 1–1 away draw against Real Oviedo.

On 19 September 2020, free agent Manchón signed for UD Montijo in the fourth division.
