= Ibrahim Amadou =

French footballer (born 1993)

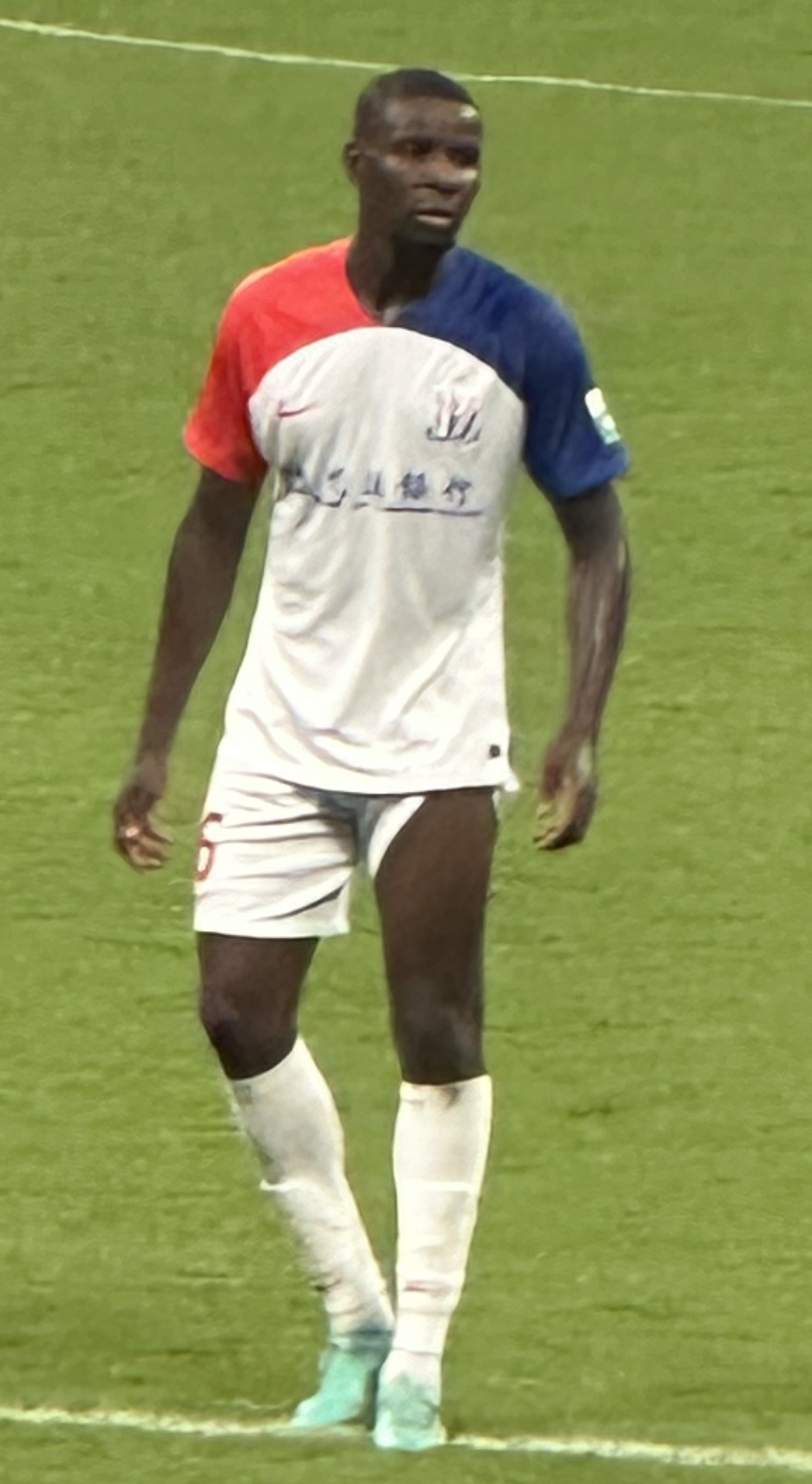
- Amadou playing for Shanghai Shenhua in 2024

Personal information
- Full name: Ibrahim Amadou
- Date of birth: 6 April 1993 (age 33)
- Place of birth: Douala, Cameroon
- Height: 1.83 m (6 ft 0 in)
- Positions: Defensive midfielder; centre-back

Team information
- Current team: Chongqing Tonglianglong
- Number: 10

Youth career
- 2003–2004: CO Colombes
- 2004–2008: RCF Paris
- 2008–2013: Nancy

Senior career*
Years	Team	Apps	(Gls)
2010–2014	Nancy II	38	(1)
2013–2015	Nancy	57	(2)
2015	Lille II	5	(1)
2015–2018	Lille	87	(2)
2018–2022	Sevilla	17	(0)
2019–2020	→ Norwich City (loan)	11	(0)
2020	→ Leganés (loan)	10	(0)
2020–2021	→ Angers (loan)	24	(0)
2022	Metz	10	(1)
2022	Angers II	1	(0)
2022–2023	Angers	7	(0)
2023–2025	Shanghai Shenhua	68	(4)
2026–	Chongqing Tonglianglong	24	(0)

International career
2012	France U19	2	(0)
- * Club domestic league appearances and goals as of 19 November 2026

Ibrahim Amadou (born 6 April 1993) is a French professional footballer who plays for Chinese Super League club Chongqing Tonglianglong. Primarily a defensive midfielder, he also plays as a centre-back.

== Club career ==
=== Nancy ===
Born in Douala, Cameroon, Amadou moved to France at age 4 and lived in Colombes, where he played at local club AS Cheminots de l'Ouest. He then spent four years at Racing Club de France, before joining the Nancy academy in 2008.

Amadou made his professional debut on 26 May 2013, playing one minute in the last matchday of the Ligue 1 season against Stade Brestois. On 8 August 2014, he scored his first goal against Orléans in Ligue 2.

=== Lille ===
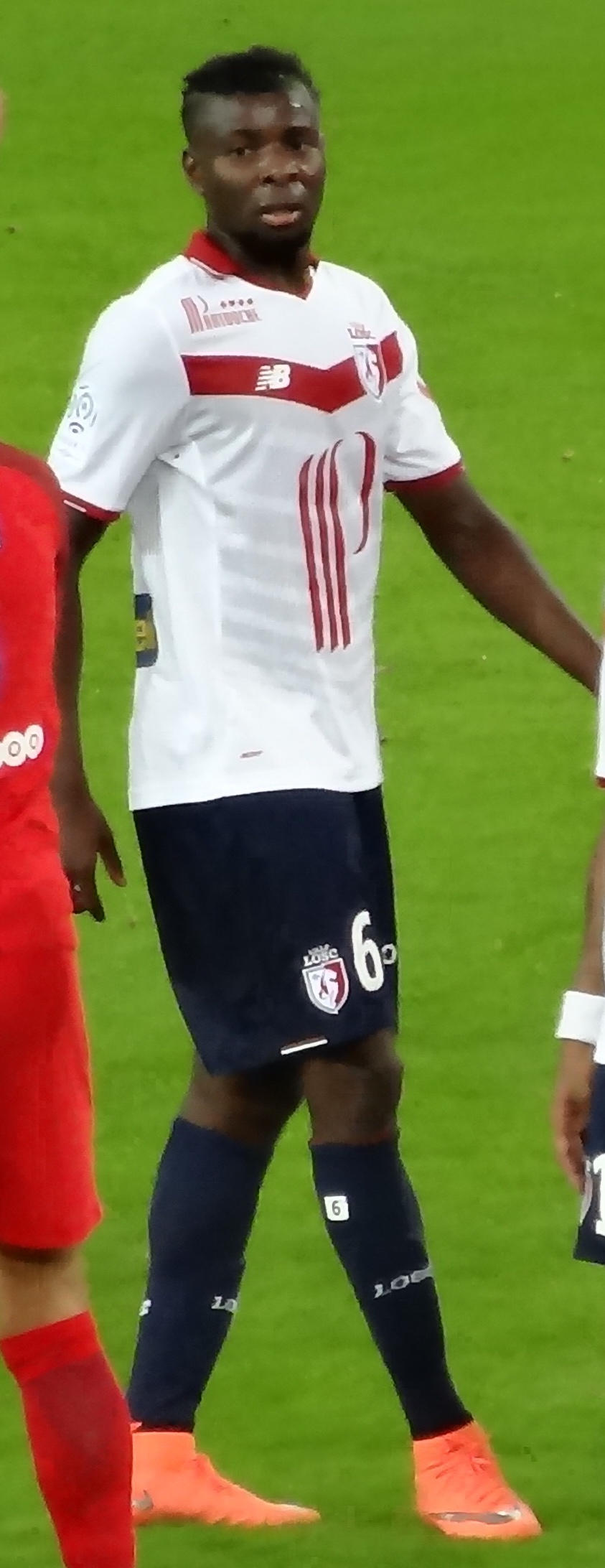
Amadou with Lille in 2016

On 16 July 2015, Amadou signed a four-year contract with Lille for a reported fee of €2 million. He started in the first match of the 2015–16 Ligue 1 season against Paris Saint-Germain on 7 August 2015, playing in the heart of defense alongside Renato Civelli as Lille suffered a 1–0 defeat. He scored his first goal for the club in the 2–1 win over Bastia on 12 March 2016.

At the start of the 2017–18 season, manager Marcelo Bielsa appointed Amadou as club captain. On 13 August 2017, he took over the goalkeeping role in the 3–0 loss to Strasbourg, following the sending off of Mike Maignan.

=== Sevilla ===
On 2 July 2018, Amadou joined Spanish La Liga side Sevilla on a four-year deal.

On 7 August 2019, Amadou joined Norwich City on a season-long loan, with an option to buy the following summer.

On 31 January 2020, Amadou's loan to Norwich was terminated, and he joined Leganés until the end of the season.

On 5 October 2020, Amadou joined French club Angers on loan.

On 12 January 2022, he mutually terminated his contract with Sevilla.

=== Metz ===
On 13 January 2022, Amadou signed for French club Metz on a contract until the end of the 2021–22 season. An option for a further two seasons was included in the deal.

=== Return to Angers ===
On 1 September 2022, Amadou returned to Angers on a one-year contract. On 18 March 2023, he mutually terminated his contract with Angers.

=== Shanghai Shenhua ===
On 30 March 2023, Amadou joined Chinese Super League club Shanghai Shenhua.

=== Chongqing Tonglianglong ===
On 6 February 2026, Amadou left Shanghai Shenhua and joined another Chinese Super League club Chongqing Tonglianglong as free agent.

== International career ==
Amadou was born in Cameroon and raised in France. He is a French youth international, and was called up to the senior Cameroon national team, whom he rejected.

== Career statistics ==
As of match played on 8 November 2026

Appearances and goals by club, season and competition
Club	Season	League			National cup		League cup		Continental		Other		Total	
Club	Season	Division	Apps	Goals	Apps	Goals	Apps	Goals	Apps	Goals	Apps	Goals	Apps	Goals
Nancy II	2010–11	CFA	4	0	—		—		—		—		4	0
Nancy II	2011–12	CFA	7	0	—		—		—		—		7	0
Nancy II	2012–13	CFA	16	1	—		—		—		—		16	1
Nancy II	2013–14	CFA 2	11	0	—		—		—		—		11	0
Nancy II	Total		38	1	—		—		—		—		38	1
Nancy	2012–13	Ligue 1	1	0	2	0	0	0	—		—		3	0
Nancy	2013–14	Ligue 2	20	0	1	0	1	0	—		—		22	0
Nancy	2014–15	Ligue 2	36	2	2	0	1	0	—		—		39	2
Nancy	Total		57	2	5	0	2	0	—		—		64	2
Lille II	2015–16	CFA 2	5	1	—		—		—		—		5	1
Lille	2015–16	Ligue 1	22	1	2	0	5	0	0	0	—		29	1
Lille	2016–17	Ligue 1	35	1	3	1	1	0	2 (Note: Appearance(s) in UEFA Europa League)	0	—		41	2
Lille	2017–18	Ligue 1	30	0	2	0	0	0	0	0	—		32	0
Lille	Total		87	2	7	1	6	0	2	0	—		102	3
Sevilla	2018–19	La Liga	17	0	6	0	—		9	0	—		32	0
Norwich City (loan)	2019–20	Premier League	11	0	1	0	1	0	—		—		13	0
Leganés (loan)	2019–20	La Liga	10	0	0	0	—		—		—		10	0
Angers (loan)	2020–21	Ligue 1	24	0	4	2	—		—		—		28	2
Metz	2021–22	Ligue 1	10	1	0	0	—		—		—		10	1
Angers II	2022–23	CFA 2	1	0	0	0	—		—		—		1	0
Angers	2022–23	Ligue 1	7	0	1	0	—		—		—		8	0
Shanghai Shenhua	2023	Chinese Super League	28	2	3	0	—		—		—		31	2
Shanghai Shenhua	2024	Chinese Super League	27	2	3	0	—		3 (Note: Appearance(s) in AFC Champions League Elite)	0	1 (Note: Appearance(s) in Chinese Super Cup)	0	34	2
Shanghai Shenhua	2025	Chinese Super League	13	0	1	0	—		5	0	1	1	20	1
Shanghai Shenhua	Total		68	4	7	0	—		8	0	2	1	85	5
Chongqing Tonglianglong	2026	Chinese Super League	24	0	1	0	—		—		—		25	0
Career total			359	11	32	3	9	0	19	0	2	1	421	15

== Honours ==
Lille

- Coupe de la Ligue runner-up: 2015–16

Shanghai Shenhua

- Chinese FA Cup: 2023
- Chinese FA Super Cup: 2024, 2025
