= Borja Lasso =

Spanish footballer (born 1994)

Personal information
- Full name: Francisco Borja Lasso de la Vega Gayán
- Date of birth: 1 January 1994 (age 32)
- Place of birth: Seville, Spain
- Height: 1.86 m (6 ft 1 in)
- Position: Attacking midfielder

Youth career
- Claret
- 2007–2013: Sevilla

Senior career*
| Years | Team | Apps | (Gls) |
| 2013–2017 | Sevilla B | 119 | (9) |
| 2016–2019 | Sevilla | 7 | (0) |
| 2018 | → Osasuna (loan) | 19 | (2) |
| 2019–2021 | Tenerife | 36 | (4) |
| Total | | 175 | (15) |
- * Club domestic league appearances and goals

Francisco Borja Lasso de la Vega Gayán (born 1 January 1994) is a Spanish retired footballer who played as an attacking midfielder.

== Club career ==
=== Sevilla ===
Born in Seville, Andalusia, Lasso represented CD Claret and Sevilla FC as a youth. He made his senior debut for the latter's reserves on 31 March 2013, coming on as a second-half substitute for Jony in a 0–1 Segunda División B away loss against Real Jaén.

Lasso was definitely promoted to the B-team in July 2013, also renewing his contract until 2015. He scored his first goal as a senior on 23 November 2014, netting the first in a 3–0 home win against Marbella FC.

Lasso was an undisputed starter during the 2015–16 campaign, scoring six goals in 40 appearances, as his side achieved promotion to Segunda División. He was also named on the bench for a La Liga match against Granada CF on 7 May 2016, but remained unused in a 1–4 home loss the following day.

On 5 July 2016, Lasso extended his link until 2018. He made his professional debut on 21 August, starting and scoring the second in a 3–3 Segunda División home draw against Girona FC. In the 2016-17 season, Lasso was an undisputed starter, scoring 3 goals and giving 11 assists as his side finished 13th.

On 17 August 2017, Lasso was definitely promoted to the main squad in La Liga, and extended his contract until 2019. Two days later he made his debut in the category, starting in a 1–1 home draw against RCD Espanyol.

On 10 January 2018, Lasso was loaned to CA Osasuna in the second division, for six months. Upon returning, he was rarely used by new manager Pablo Machín, appearing in only two cup matches for the first half of the season.

=== Tenerife ===
On 9 January 2019, Lasso agreed to a two-and-a-half-year contract with CD Tenerife in the second level. He became an immediate starter for the club until breaking his fibula in December during a match against AD Alcorcón, following a tackle by Serhiy Myakushko.

Lasso subsequently returned to trainings in September 2020, but was operated again in December 2020 after having "troubles with his dorsal flexion of his foot" and having a "deformity on one of his fingers". He announced his retirement from professional football at the age of just 27 on 14 December 2021, after being unable to fully recover from his injury.
