= Javi Díaz =

Spanish footballer (born 1997)

Personal information
- Full name: Javier Díaz Sánchez
- Date of birth: 15 May 1997 (age 29)
- Place of birth: Mairena del Aljarafe, Spain
- Height: 1.82 m (6 ft 0 in)
- Position: Goalkeeper

Team information
- Current team: Inter d'Escaldes
- Number: 13

Youth career
- Sevilla

Senior career*
Years	Team	Apps	(Gls)
2016–2018	Sevilla C	36	(0)
2018–2022	Sevilla B	44	(0)
2019–2022	Sevilla	2	(0)
2022–2024	Tenerife	0	(0)
2023–2024	→ Fuenlabrada (loan)	1	(0)
2024–	Inter d'Escaldes	47	(0)
- * Club domestic league appearances and goals as of 10 June 2026

Javier "Javi" Díaz Sánchez (born 15 May 1997) is a Spanish professional footballer who plays as a goalkeeper for Andorran club Inter Club d'Escaldes.

== Club career ==
=== Sevilla ===
Born in Mairena del Aljarafe, Province of Seville, Andalusia, Díaz represented Sevilla FC as a youth. He made his senior debut with the C side on 3 April 2016, starting in a 1–0 Tercera División away loss against CD Cabecense.

Ahead of the 2018–19 season, Díaz was promoted to the reserves in Segunda División B. He played his first match in La Liga with the first team on 31 March 2019, starting in a 0–1 home defeat to Valencia CF as starter Tomáš Vaclík was injured and backup Juan Soriano suspended.

=== Tenerife ===
On 7 July 2022, Díaz signed a three-year contract with Segunda División club CD Tenerife. On 28 July of the following year, after being only a backup to Soriano, he was loaned to Primera Federación side CF Fuenlabrada for one year.

On 16 July 2024, after featuring in just one league match for Fuenla, Díaz terminated his link with Tenerife.

== Career statistics ==
As of 31 March 2019

Club	Season	League			Cup		League Cup		Europe		Other		Total	
Club	Season	Division	Apps	Goals	Apps	Goals	Apps	Goals	Apps	Goals	Apps	Goals	Apps	Goals
Sevilla	2018–19	La Liga	1	0	0	0	0	0	0	0	—		1	0
Sevilla	2019–20	La Liga	0	0	0	0	0	0	0	0	—		0	0
Career total			1	0	0	0	0	0	0	0	0	0	1	0

== Honours ==
Sevilla

- UEFA Europa League: 2019–20
