= 2020–21 CD Tenerife season =

CD Tenerife
2020–21 season
- Owner: Miguel Concepción
- President: Miguel Concepción
- Head coach: Rubén Baraja
- Stadium: Heliodoro Rodríguez López
- Segunda División: 14th
- Copa del Rey: Round of 32
- Top goalscorer: League: Fran Sol (10); All: Fran Sol (10)
Home colours	Away colours	Third colours

The 2020–21 Club Deportivo Tenerife season was the club's 109th season in existence and its eighth consecutive season in the second division of Spanish football. In addition to the domestic league, Tenerife participated in this season's edition of the Copa del Rey. The season covered the period from 21 July 2020 to 30 June 2021.

== Players ==
=== First-team squad ===
Note: Flags indicate national team as defined under FIFA eligibility rules; some limited exceptions apply. Players may hold more than one non-FIFA nationality.

No.	Pos.	Nation	Player
1	GK	ESP	Jon Ander Serantes
2	DF	GEO	Otar Kakabadze
3	DF	ESP	Álex Muñoz
4	DF	POR	Bruno Wilson (on loan from Braga)
5	DF	ESP	Alberto Jiménez
6	MF	ARG	Valentín Vada (on loan from Almería)
7	MF	ESP	Jacobo González
8	MF	ESP	Borja Lasso
9	FW	ESP	Nono
10	MF	ESP	Suso (Captain)
11	MF	ESP	Álex Bermejo
12	DF	ESP	Sergio González (on loan from Cádiz)
13	GK	VEN	Dani Hernández
14	DF	ESP	Carlos Ruiz

No.	Pos.	Nation	Player
15	DF	ESP	Carlos Pomares
16	MF	ESP	Aitor Sanz (2nd captain)
17	MF	ENG	Samuel Shashoua
18	FW	ESP	Joselu
19	FW	ESP	Fran Sol (on loan from Dynamo Kyiv)
20	FW	NGR	Manu Apeh
21	DF	USA	Shaq Moore
22	MF	URU	Gio Zarfino (on loan from Extremadura)
23	DF	SRB	Nikola Šipčić
24	MF	ESP	Ramón Folch (on loan from Elche)
26	MF	ESP	Javi Alonso
29	FW	ESP	Jorge Padilla
35	MF	ESP	Dylan Perera
37	FW	ESP	Germán Valera (on loan from Atlético Madrid)

=== Reserve team ===
Note: Flags indicate national team as defined under FIFA eligibility rules; some limited exceptions apply. Players may hold more than one non-FIFA nationality.

No.	Pos.	Nation	Player
27	MF	ESP	Álex Cruz
30	GK	ESP	Víctor Méndez
31	DF	GAM	Omar Jaiteh
32	DF	ESP	Borja Bethencourt

No.	Pos.	Nation	Player
34	DF	ESP	David Rodríguez
36	MF	ESP	Félix Alonso
38	DF	ESP	Jeremy Socorro
40	GK	ESP	Alejandro Medina

=== Out on loan ===
Note: Flags indicate national team as defined under FIFA eligibility rules; some limited exceptions apply. Players may hold more than one non-FIFA nationality.

No.	Pos.	Nation	Player
—	GK	ESP	Ignacio Otaño (at Tudelano until 30 June 2021)
—	DF	URU	Fede Olivera (at Marino until 30 June 2021)
—	MF	ESP	Josué Medina (at Unionistas until 30 June 2021)
—	FW	ESP	Elliot Gómez (at Valladolid Promesas until 30 June 2021)

No.	Pos.	Nation	Player
—	MF	ESP	Matías Nahuel (at Oviedo until 30 June 2021)
—	FW	ESP	Adri Herrera (at Zamora until 30 June 2021)
—	FW	ESP	Borja Llarena (at Marino until 30 June 2021)
—	FW	ESP	José Naranjo (at AEK Larnaca until 30 June 2021)

== Pre-season and friendlies ==
Win Draw Loss

25 August 2020 Friendly	Villarreal	2–3	Tenerife	San Pedro del Pinatar, Spain
20:00 CEST (UTC+2)	Baena 43'; Alcácer 54'	Report	Apeh 46'; Padilla 51'; Torres 64' (o.g.)	Stadium: Pinatar Arena; Attendance: 0 Referee: Francisco Hernández Maeso

29 August 2020 Friendly	Mallorca	2–0	Tenerife	San Pedro del Pinatar, Spain
22:00 CEST (UTC+2)	Abdón (yellow card) 25'; Sedlar (yellow card) 36'; Trajkovski 82'; Stoichkov 85'	Report	Sashoua (yellow card) 72'	Stadium: Pinatar Arena; Attendance: 0 Referee: David Gálvez Rascón

4 September 2020 Friendly	Tenerife	1–3	Las Palmas	Santa Cruz de Tenerife, Spain
19:00 CEST (UTC+2)	Pomares 78'	Report	Rober 46'; Rodríguez 59'; Maikel 90+3' (pen.)	Stadium: Heliodoro Rodríguez López; Attendance: 0 Referee: Alexander González González

== Competitions ==
=== Overview ===
Competition	First match	Last match	Starting round	Final position	Record							
Competition	First match	Last match	Starting round	Final position	Pld	W	D	L	GF	GA	GD	Win %
Segunda División	13 September 2020	29 May 2021	Matchday 1	14th	42	13	13	16	36	36	+0	30.95
Copa del Rey	15 December 2020	17 January 2021	First round	Round of 32	3	2	0	1	4	1	+3	66.67
Total					45	15	13	17	40	37	+3	33.33

Source: Soccerway

=== Segunda División ===
==== League table ====
Pos	Team	Pld	W	D	L	GF	GA	GD	Pts
12	Málaga	42	14	11	17	37	47	−10	53
13	Oviedo	42	11	19	12	45	46	−1	52 (Note: Head-to-head points: Oviedo: 4, Tenerife: 1)
14	Tenerife	42	13	13	16	36	36	0	52
15	Zaragoza	42	13	11	18	37	43	−6	50
16	Cartagena	42	12	13	17	44	52	−8	49

Source: LaLiga
Rules for classification: 1) points; 2) head-to-head points; 3) head-to-head goal difference; 4) goal difference; 5) number of goals scored

==== Results summary ====
Overall								Home						Away					
Pld	W	D	L	GF	GA	GD	Pts	W	D	L	GF	GA	GD	W	D	L	GF	GA	GD
42	13	13	16	36	36	0	52	9	7	5	24	14	+10	4	6	11	12	22	−10

Source: La Liga

==== Results by round ====
Round	1	2	3	4	5	6	7	8	9	10	11	12	13	14	15	16	17	18	19	20	21	22	23	24	25	26	27	28	29	30	31	32	33	34	35	36	37	38	39	40	41	42
Ground	H	A	H	A	H	A	A	H	H	A	H	A	H	A	A	H	H	A	H	A	H	A	H	A	H	A	H	A	H	A	H	A	A	H	A	H	A	H	A	H	A	H
Result	W	L	L	L	W	D	L	D	D	D	W	L	L	L	W	L	D	L	W	W	W	L	D	W	W	L	W	L	W	D	D	D	L	W	D	D	L	L	W	L	D	D
Position	3	9	13	17	15	14	16	17	16	18	17	17	17	17	17	17	17	19	16	16	16	16	16	14	11	14	10	13	10	11	11	12	13	11	12	11	13	14	11	11	11	14

Source: La Liga
A = Away; H = Home; W = Win; D = Draw; L = Loss

==== Matches ====
The league fixtures were announced on 31 August 2020.

13 September 2020 1	Tenerife	2–0	Málaga	Santa Cruz de Tenerife
21:00 CEST (UTC+2)	Suso 42'; Jacobo 56'	Report		Stadium: Heliodoro Rodríguez López; Attendance: 0 (Note: The match was played behind closed doors due to the COVID-19 pandemic in Spain.); Referee: Eduardo Prieto Iglesias

19 September 2020 2	Alcorcón	2–0	Tenerife	Alcorcón
18:15 CEST (UTC+2)	Barbero 74'; Fraile 84'	Report		Stadium: Santo Domingo; Attendance: 0 Referee: Óliver de la Fuente Ramos

27 September 2020 3	Tenerife	1–2	Mirandés	Santa Cruz de Tenerife
18:15 CEST (UTC+2)		Report		Stadium: Heliodoro Rodríguez López; Attendance: 0 Referee: David Gálvez Rascón

3 October 2020 4	Mallorca	2–0	Tenerife	Palma
18:15 CEST (UTC+2)	Valjent 20'; Baba (yellow card) 51'; Rodríguez 55' (pen.)	Report	Zarfino (yellow card) 14'; Wilson (yellow card) 90'	Stadium: Visit Mallorca Stadium; Attendance: 0 Referee: José Antonio López Toca

10 October 2020 5	Tenerife	1–0	Rayo Vallecano	Santa Cruz de Tenerife
21:00 CEST (UTC+2)	Bermejo 80'	Report		Stadium: Heliodoro Rodríguez López; Attendance: 0 Referee: Javier Iglesias Villanueva

18 October 2020 6	Sporting Gijón	1–1	Tenerife	Gijón
21:00 CEST (UTC+2)	Díaz 65'; García (yellow card) 74'	Report	Moore (yellow card) 29'; Zarfino (yellow card) 52', (goal) 85'; González (yellow card) 88'	Stadium: El Molinón; Attendance: 0 Referee: Dámaso Arcediano Monescillo

21 October 2020 7	Ponferradina	1–0	Tenerife	Ponferrada
19:00 CEST (UTC+2)	Valcarce 20'	Report		Stadium: El Toralín; Attendance: 0 Referee: Aitor Gorostegui Fernández-Ortega

25 October 2020 8	Tenerife	0–0	Espanyol	Santa Cruz de Tenerife
18:15 CEST (UTC+2)	Wilson (yellow card) 13'; Sanz (yellow card) 90+3'	Report	L. López (yellow card) 8'	Stadium: Heliodoro Rodríguez López; Attendance: 0 Referee: Jon González Esteban

29 October 2020 9	Tenerife	1–1	Lugo	Santa Cruz de Tenerife
19:00 CET (UTC+1)	Sol 39'	Report	Juanpe 90+5'	Stadium: Heliodoro Rodríguez López; Attendance: 0 Referee: Francisco José Hernández Maeso

1 November 2020 10	Fuenlabrada	1–1	Tenerife	Fuenlabrada
18:15 CET (UTC+1)	Gassama 38'	Report	Padilla 62'	Stadium: Fernando Torres; Attendance: 0 Referee: Rubén Ávalos Barrera

8 November 2020 11	Tenerife	1–0	Zaragoza	Santa Cruz de Tenerife
20:30 CET (UTC+1)	Álvarez 15' (o.g.)	Report		Stadium: Heliodoro Rodríguez López; Attendance: 0 Referee: Alejandro Muñiz Ruiz

15 November 2020 12	Las Palmas	1–0	Tenerife	Las Palmas
22:00 CET (UTC+1)	Jonathan (yellow card) 38'; Ortolá 48' (o.g.); Rober (yellow card) 72'; Lemos (yellow card) 90+4'	Report	González (yellow card) 90+2'	Stadium: Estadio Gran Canaria; Attendance: 0 Referee: Dámaso Arcediano Monescillo

22 November 2020 13	Tenerife	0–1	UD Logroñés	Santa Cruz de Tenerife
18:15 CET (UTC+1)		Report	González 31'	Stadium: Heliodoro Rodríguez López; Attendance: 0 Referee: Gorka Sagués Oscoz

26 November 2020 14	Almería	2–0	Tenerife	Almería
21:30 CET (UTC+1)	Robertone (yellow card) 31'; Lazo 51' (pen.); Corpas (yellow card) 71'; Sadiq 75' (pen.)	Report	Folch (yellow card) 40'; Wilson (yellow card) 48'; Santana (yellow card) 49'	Stadium: Estadio de los Juegos Mediterráneos; Attendance: 0 Referee: Álvaro Moreno Aragón

29 November 2020 15	Albacete	0–2	Tenerife	Albacete
14:00 CET (UTC+1)	Azamoum (yellow card) 32'; Caballo (yellow card) 56'	Report	Shashoua 67'; Sol 84'	Stadium: Carlos Belmonte; Attendance: 0 Referee: Miguel Ortíz Arias

3 December 2020 16	Tenerife	1–2	Sabadell	Santa Cruz de Tenerife
19:00 CET (UTC+1)	Muñoz 34'	Report	Stoichkov 1'; Coch 19'	Stadium: Heliodoro Rodríguez López; Attendance: 0 Referee: Óliver de la Fuente Ramos

7 December 2020 17	Tenerife	0–0	Leganés	Santa Cruz de Tenerife
19:00 CET (UTC+1)	Padilla (yellow card) 8'; Alonso (yellow card) 10'; Pomares (yellow card) 22'; Jiménez (yellow card) 90+3'	Report	Arnaiz (yellow card) 67'; Perea (yellow card) 89'	Stadium: Heliodoro Rodríguez López; Attendance: 0 Referee: Luis Mario Milla Alvéndiz

11 December 2020 18	Oviedo	4–2	Tenerife	Oviedo
21:00 CET (UTC+1)	Blanco 4', 8'; Rodri 66'; Sánchez 79'	Report	Bermejo 16'; Ruiz 64'	Stadium: Carlos Tartiere; Attendance: 0 Referee: Saúl Ais Reig

21 December 2020 19	Tenerife	2–0	Girona	Santa Cruz de Tenerife
21:30 CET (UTC+1)	Wilson 7'; Sol 34'	Report		Stadium: Heliodoro Rodríguez López; Attendance: 0 Referee: José Antonio López Toca

3 January 2021 20	Castellón	0–1	Tenerife	Castellón de la Plana
14:00 CET (UTC+1)	Jamelli (yellow card) 53'; Díaz (yellow card) 90+2'	Report	Bermejo (yellow card) 24'; Apeh (yellow card) 30'; Sanz (yellow card) 49'; Alonso (yellow card) 59'; Pomares 66'; Vada (yellow card) 90+4'	Stadium: Nou Estadi Castàlia; Attendance: 0 Referee: Rubén Ávalos Barrera

10 January 2021 21	Tenerife	3–0	Cartagena	Santa Cruz de Tenerife
18:15 CET (UTC+1)	Sol 13' (pen.), 74'; Shashoua 54'	Report		Stadium: Heliodoro Rodríguez López; Attendance: 0 Referee: Alejandro Muñiz Ruiz

23 January 2021 22	Lugo	2–0	Tenerife	Lugo
18:15 CET (UTC+1)	Herrera 12'; Rama 54'	Report		Stadium: Anxo Carro; Attendance: 0 Referee: Gorka Sagués Oscoz

31 January 2021 23	Tenerife	1–1	Fuenlabrada	Santa Cruz de Tenerife
20:30 CET (UTC+1)	Pomares 76'	Report	Wilson 21' (o.g.)	Stadium: Heliodoro Rodríguez López; Attendance: 0 Referee: Óliver de la Fuente Ramos

7 February 2021 24	Rayo Vallecano	0–1	Tenerife	Madrid
18:15 CET (UTC+1)		Report	Sol 65'	Stadium: Vallecas; Attendance: 0 Referee: Iosu Galech Apezteguía

13 February 2021 25	Tenerife	1–0	Ponferradina	Santa Cruz de Tenerife
20:30 CET (UTC+1)	Valera 86'	Report		Stadium: Heliodoro Rodríguez López; Attendance: 0 Referee: Iñaki Vicandi Garrido

21 February 2021 26	Leganés	1–0	Tenerife	Leganés
14:00 CET (UTC+1)	Hernández 53'	Report		Stadium: Estadio Municipal de Butarque; Attendance: 0 Referee: Rubén Ávalos Barrera

28 February 2021 27	Tenerife	3–1	Alcorcón	Santa Cruz de Tenerife
18:15 CET (UTC+1)	Apeh (yellow card) 5'; Sol 77'; Shashoua 82'; González (yellow card) 89' (yellow-red card) 90+4'; Valera 90+5'	Report	Bellvís (yellow card) 8'; Laure (yellow card) 83'; Aguilera (yellow card) 83'; León 90+1'	Stadium: Heliodoro Rodríguez López; Attendance: 0 Referee: Aitor Gorostegui Fernández Ortega

6 March 2021 28	Zaragoza	1–0	Tenerife	Zaragoza
16:00 CET (UTC+1)	Alegría 21'	Report	Vada (yellow card) 50'; Nono (yellow card) 74'; Alonso (yellow card) 76'; Pomares (yellow card) 78'; Ruiz (yellow card) 87'	Stadium: La Romareda; Attendance: 0 Referee: Álvaro Moreno Aragón

14 March 2021 29	Tenerife	2–0	Albacete	Santa Cruz de Tenerife
18:15 CET (UTC+1)	Moore (yellow card) 3'; Vada (yellow card) 79'; Muñoz 86', 90+2'	Report	Israfilov (yellow card) 31'; Teguia (yellow card) 38'; Arroyo (yellow card) 64'; Tana (yellow card) 83'; Kecojević (yellow card) 87'	Stadium: Heliodoro Rodríguez López; Attendance: 0 Referee: Rafael Sánchez López

21 March 2021 30	Málaga	1–1	Tenerife	Málaga
16:00 CET (UTC+1)	Muñoz 23'	Report	Folch 79'	Stadium: La Rosaleda; Attendance: 0 Referee: Daniel Ocón Arráiz

28 March 2021 31	Tenerife	1–1	Las Palmas	Santa Cruz de Tenerife
21:30 CEST (UTC+2)	Vada 10', (yellow card) 19'; Santana (yellow card) 84'; Šipčić (yellow card) 89'; C. Ruiz (yellow card) 90+6'	Report	S. Ruiz 41'; Pejiño (yellow card) 43'	Stadium: Heliodoro Rodríguez López; Attendance: 0 Referee: Luis Mario Milla Alvéndiz

3 April 2021 33	UD Logroñés	1–0	Tenerife	Logroño
14:00 CEST (UTC+2)	Sáenz 59'	Report		Stadium: Las Gaunas; Attendance: 0 Referee: Iñaki Vicandi Garrido

9 April 2021 34	Tenerife	1–0	Sporting Gijón	Santa Cruz de Tenerife
21:00 CEST (UTC+2)	Sol 66'	Report		Stadium: Heliodoro Rodríguez López; Attendance: 0 Referee: Iosu Galech Apezteguía

18 April 2021 35	Cartagena	0–0	Tenerife	Cartagena
18:15 CEST (UTC+2)		Report		Stadium: Cartagonova; Attendance: 0 Referee: Óliver de la Fuente Ramos

21 April 2021 32	Mirandés	0–0	Tenerife	Miranda de Ebro
19:00 CEST (UTC+2)		Report		Stadium: Estadio Municipal de Anduva; Attendance: 0 Referee: Iosu Galech Apezteguía

25 April 2021 36	Tenerife	1–1	Castellón	Santa Cruz de Tenerife
20:30 CEST (UTC+2)	Sol 41'; Nono (penalty missed) 73'	Report	Díez 49'	Stadium: Heliodoro Rodríguez López; Attendance: 0 Referee: Rafael Sánchez López

1 May 2021 37	Girona	1–0	Tenerife	Girona
16:00 CEST (UTC+2)	Franquesa 33'	Report		Stadium: Montilivi; Attendance: 0 Referee: Rubén Ávalos Barrera

7 May 2021 38	Tenerife	0–1	Almería	Santa Cruz de Tenerife
21:00 CEST (UTC+2)	Alberto (red card) 41'; Moore (yellow card) 73'; Pomares (yellow card) 80'; González (yellow card) 84'	Report	Robertone (yellow card) 53'; Maraš (yellow card) 59'; Ramazani 69'	Stadium: Heliodoro Rodríguez López; Attendance: 0 Referee: Álvaro Moreno Aragón

16 May 2021 39	Sabadell	0–2	Tenerife	Sabadell
14:00 CEST (UTC+2)		Report	Vada 22'; González 51'	Stadium: Estadi de la Nova Creu Alta; Attendance: 0 Referee: José Antonio López Toca

19 May 2021 40	Tenerife	0–1	Mallorca	Santa Cruz de Tenerife
21:30 CEST (UTC+2)	Kakabadze (yellow card) 12'; Alberto (yellow card) 19'; Vada (yellow card) 67'; Muñoz (yellow card) 79'; Shashoua (yellow card) 90+1'	Report	Mboula (yellow card) 39'; Mollejo 43'; Baba (yellow card) 66'	Stadium: Heliodoro Rodríguez López; Attendance: 0 Referee: Rubén Ávalos Barrera

23 May 2021 41	Espanyol	1–1	Tenerife	Cornellà de Llobregat
18:15 CEST (UTC+2)	Pedrosa (yellow card) 43'; De Tomás 62', (yellow card) 70'; Embarba (yellow card) 85'; Darder (red card) 90'; Di. López (yellow card) 90'	Report	Pomares 5', (yellow card) 66'; Nono (yellow card) 49'; Serantes (yellow card) 90'	Stadium: RCDE Stadium; Attendance: 0 Referee: Óliver de la Fuente Ramos

29 May 2021 42	Tenerife	2–2	Oviedo	Santa Cruz de Tenerife
18:30 CEST (UTC+2)	Sol 51' (pen.); Santana 77' (pen.)	Report	Sánchez 7'; Blanco 90+3'	Stadium: Heliodoro Rodríguez López; Attendance: 0 Referee: Daniel Ocón Arráiz

=== Copa del Rey ===
15 December 2020 First round	Sestao River	0–2 (a.e.t.)	Tenerife	Sestao
19:00 CET (UTC+1)		Report	Shashoua 99'; Apeh 103'	Stadium: Las Llanas; Referee: Daniel Ocón Arráiz

6 January 2021 Second round	Castellón	0–2	Tenerife	Castellón
20:00 CET (UTC+1)	Ortuño (yellow card) 40'; García (penalty missed) 79'	Report	Vada 4', (yellow card) 32'; Ruiz 45'; Sanz (yellow card) 78'; Jiménez (yellow card) 82'; Bermejo (yellow card) 85'	Stadium: Castàlia; Referee: Alejandro Muñiz Ruiz

17 January 2021 Round of 32	Tenerife	0–1	Villarreal	Santa Cruz de Tenerife
17:00 CET (UTC+1)	Vada (yellow card) 31'; Zarfino (yellow card) 86'	Report	Niño 90'	Stadium: Heliodoro Rodríguez López; Referee: César Soto Grado
