= 2022–23 CD Tenerife season =

CD Tenerife
2022–23 season
- President: Miguel Concepción Cáceres
- Head coach: Luis Miguel Ramis
- Stadium: Heliodoro Rodríguez López
- Segunda División: 10th
- Copa del Rey: Second round
- Top goalscorer: League: Enric Gallego (11); All: Enric Gallego (11)

The 2022–23 season was the 111th season in the history of CD Tenerife and their 10th consecutive season in the second division. The club participated in the Segunda División and the Copa del Rey.

== Players ==
As of 3 November 2022.

Note: Flags indicate national team as defined under FIFA eligibility rules; some limited exceptions apply. Players may hold more than one non-FIFA nationality.

No.	Pos.	Nation	Player
1	GK	ESP	Juan Soriano
2	DF	ESP	Aitor Buñuel
4	DF	ESP	José León
5	DF	ESP	Sergio González
6	MF	ESP	Álex Corredera
7	FW	ESP	Elady Zorrilla
8	MF	ESP	Javi Alonso
9	FW	ESP	Borja Garcés (on loan from Atlético Madrid)
10	MF	ENG	Samuel Shashoua
11	FW	GHA	Mo Dauda (on loan from Anderlecht)
12	DF	ESP	Andoni López
13	GK	ESP	Javi Díaz
14	DF	ESP	Carlos Ruiz
15	MF	ESP	Pablo Larrea

No.	Pos.	Nation	Player
16	MF	ESP	Aitor Sanz (captain)
17	MF	ESP	Waldo Rubio
18	FW	ESP	Enric Gallego
19	FW	ESP	Iván Romero (on loan from Sevilla)
20	MF	ESP	José Ángel Jurado
21	FW	ENG	Arvin Appiah (on loan from Almería)
22	DF	FRA	Jérémy Mellot
23	DF	MNE	Nikola Šipčić
24	DF	ESP	Nacho Martínez
26	DF	ESP	David Rodríguez
27	FW	ESP	Alassan
31	FW	ESP	Teto
32	MF	ESP	Ibra Barry

=== Reserve team ===
Note: Flags indicate national team as defined under FIFA eligibility rules; some limited exceptions apply. Players may hold more than one non-FIFA nationality.

No.	Pos.	Nation	Player
28	MF	ESP	Pablo Hernández
29	FW	ESP	Cacho Guzmán
30	GK	ESP	Víctor Méndez

No.	Pos.	Nation	Player
33	MF	ESP	Matías Cedrés
34	FW	ESP	Daniel Selma

=== Out on loan ===
Note: Flags indicate national team as defined under FIFA eligibility rules; some limited exceptions apply. Players may hold more than one non-FIFA nationality.

No.	Pos.	Nation	Player
—	DF	ESP	Jeremy Socorro (at Antequera until 30 June 2023)
—	MF	ESP	Rubén Díez (at Deportivo La Coruña until 30 June 2023)
—	MF	ESP	Félix Alonso (at Atlético Paso until 30 June 2023)

No.	Pos.	Nation	Player
—	FW	GUI	Thierno Barry (at SD Logroñés until 30 June 2023)
—	FW	ESP	Jorge Padilla (at Racing Ferrol until 30 June 2023)
—	FW	ESP	Ethyan González (at Atlético Madrid B until 30 June 2023)

== Transfers ==
=== In ===
Date	Player	From	Type	Fee	Ref
30 June 2022	(Spain) Alberto Jiménez	Albacete	Loan return		
7 July 2022	(Spain) Javi Díaz	Sevilla	Transfer	Undisclosed	
22 July 2022	(Ghana) Mohammed Dauda	(Belgium) Anderlecht	Loan		
31 August 2022	(Spain) Iván Romero	Sevilla	Loan		
1 September 2022	(England) Arvin Appiah	Almería	Loan		

=== Out ===
Date	Player	To	Type	Fee	Ref
8 July 2022	(Spain) Álex Muñoz	Levante	Transfer	Undisclosed	
21 July 2022	(Spain) Álex Bermejo	Burgos	Transfer	Free	

== Pre-season and friendlies ==
Win Draw Loss Fixtures

31 July 2022 Friendly	Ibiza	0–1	Tenerife
CEST (UTC+2)

3 August 2022 Friendly	Real Murcia	3–0	Tenerife
CEST (UTC+2)

6 August 2022 Friendly	Cartagena	1–1	Tenerife
CEST (UTC+2)

4 December 2022 Friendly	Tenerife	0–4	Brøndby	Santa Cruz de Tenerife
11:00 WET (UTC±0)				Stadium: Estadio Heliodoro Rodríguez López

== Competitions ==
=== Overall record ===
Competition	First match	Last match	Starting round	Final position	Record							
Competition	First match	Last match	Starting round	Final position	Pld	W	D	L	GF	GA	GD	Win %
Segunda División	13 August 2022	26 May 2023	Matchday 1	10th	42	14	15	13	42	37	+5	33.33
Copa del Rey	13 November 2022	21 December 2022	First round	Second round	2	1	0	1	3	2	+1	50.00
Total					44	15	15	14	45	39	+6	34.09

Source: Soccerway

=== Segunda División ===
==== League table ====
Pos	Team	Pld	W	D	L	GF	GA	GD	Pts
8	Oviedo	42	16	11	15	34	35	−1	59 (Note: Andorra finished ahead of Oviedo on head-to-head points: Oviedo 0–1 Andorra, Andorra 3–1 Oviedo.)
9	Cartagena	42	16	10	16	47	49	−2	58
10	Tenerife	42	14	15	13	42	37	+5	57
11	Burgos	42	13	15	14	33	35	−2	54 (Note: Burgos finished ahead of Racing Santander on head-to-head points: Racing Santander 0–1 Burgos, Burgos 2–1 Racing Santander.)
12	Racing Santander	42	14	12	16	39	40	−1	54

Source: LaLiga SmartBank
Rules for classification: 1) points; 2) head-to-head points; 3) head-to-head goal difference; 4) goal difference; 5) number of goals scored
Notes:

Notes

1. Reserve teams are not eligible for promotion to the same league as the first team.

==== Results summary ====
Overall								Home						Away					
Pld	W	D	L	GF	GA	GD	Pts	W	D	L	GF	GA	GD	W	D	L	GF	GA	GD
42	14	15	13	42	37	+5	57	12	6	3	28	12	+16	2	9	10	14	25	−11

Source: LaLiga SmartBank

==== Results by round ====
Round	1
Ground	
Result	
Position	

Updated to match(es) played on November 2022. Source: LaLiga SmartBank
A = Away; H = Home; W = Win; D = Draw; L = Loss

==== Matches ====
The league fixtures were announced on 23 June 2022.

13 August 2022 1	Tenerife	v	Santa Cruz de Tenerife
CEST (UTC+2)			Stadium: Heliodoro Rodríguez López

=== Copa del Rey ===
13 November 2022 First round	Lealtad	0–2	Tenerife	Langreo (Note: Lealtad did not play the game in their main stadium Les Caleyes, Villaviciosa, as it did not meet the broadcasting requirements.)
12:00 CET		Report	Alassan 3'; Elady 84' (pen.)	Stadium: Estadio Ganzábal; Referee: Óliver de la Fuente Ramos
