= 2024–25 CD Tenerife season =

CD Tenerife
2024–25 season
- Head coach: Óscar Cano (until 15 September); Pepe Mel (from 16 September to 23 December); Álvaro Cervera (from 23 December)
- Stadium: Estadio Heliodoro Rodríguez López
- Segunda División: 20th (relegated)
- Copa del Rey: Round of 32
- Top goalscorer: League: Enric Gallego (7); All: Enric Gallego (7)
- Average home league attendance: 12,831
| Home colours | Away colours | Third colours |

The 2024–25 season was the 103rd season in CD Tenerife's history and the 12th consecutive season in the Segunda División. In addition to the domestic league, the club also competed in the Copa del Rey.

On 15 September 2024, after five rounds yielding only a single point for the club from the Canary Islands, head coach Óscar Cano was relieved of his duties, just three months into his tenure with the team.

== Transfers ==
=== In ===
| Pos. | Player | Transferred from | Fee | Date | Source |
|---|---|---|---|---|---|
| GK | (Spain) Salvi Carrasco | (Spain) Tarazona | Free | 1 July 2024 | |
| MF | (Spain) Luismi Cruz | (Spain) Sevilla | €300,000 | 1 July 2024 | |
| FW | (Spain) Yanis Senhadji | (Spain) Real Betis | Loan | 2 July 2024 | |
| MF | (Mali) Youssouf Diarra | (Spain) Córdoba | Free | 2 July 2024 | |
| MF | (Spain) Adrián Guerrero | (Switzerland) Zürich | Free | 17 July 2024 | |
| MF | (Spain) Alejandro Cantero | (Spain) Levante | Undisclosed | 21 July 2024 | |
| DF | (Spain) Josep Gayá | (Spain) Mallorca | Free | 22 July 2024 | |
| FW | (Spain) Maikel Mesa | (Spain) Real Zaragoza | €500,000 | 27 July 2024 | |
| DF | (Spain) Rubén Alves | (Spain) Racing Santander | Free | 31 July 2024 | |
| MF | (Colombia) Marlos Moreno | (Turkey) Konyaspor | Undisclosed | 4 September 2024 | |
| MF | (Spain) Aarón Martín | (Saudi Arabia) Al Qadsiah | Loan | 3 February 2025 | |
| DF | (Ecuador) Anthony Landázuri | Unattached | Free | 4 February 2025 | |

=== Out ===
| Pos. | Player | Transferred to | Fee | Date | Source |
|---|---|---|---|---|---|
| DF | (Spain) Nacho | | End of contract | 1 July 2024 | |
| GK | (Spain) Juan Soriano | (Spain) Leganés | End of contract | 1 July 2024 | |
| DF | (Spain) Aitor Buñuel | (Spain) Racing Ferrol | End of contract | 1 July 2024 | |
| DF | (Montenegro) Nikola Šipčić | (Spain) Cartagena | Loan | 7 July 2024 | |
| MF | (Spain) Javi Alonso | (Spain) Algeciras | Loan | 8 July 2024 | |
| DF | (Spain) Jesús Belza | (Spain) Antequera | Loan | 22 August 2024 | |
| FW | (Ghana) Dauda Mohammed | (Spain) UD Ibiza | Loan | 22 August 2024 | |
| MF | (Spain) Álex Corredera | (Russia) Khimki | €500,000 | 12 September 2024 | |
| MF | (Spain) Aarón Martín | (Saudi Arabia) Al Qadsiah | €1,400,000 | 2 February 2025 | |

== Pre-season and friendlies ==
| 20 July 2024 Friendly | CD Marino | 0–6 | Tenerife |
| 21:30 |

| 26 July 2024 Friendly | Tenerife | 2–0 | Al Shabab |
| 19:00 |

| 27 July 2024 Friendly | CD Atlético Paso | 0–0 | Tenerife | La Palma |
| 13:00 | | | | Stadium: Estado Municipal de El Paso |

| 30 July 2024 Friendly | Alavés | 2–1 | Tenerife | Alicante |
| 19:00 | | | | Stadium: El Albir |

| 3 August 2024 Friendly | Eldense | 1–3 | Tenerife | Alicante |
| 19:00 | | | | Stadium: Albir Garden Sports de L´Alfàs del Pi |

| 10 August 2024 Teide Trophy | Tenerife | 0–1 | Real Madrid Castilla | La Orotava |
| 20:00 UTC+1 | | Report | Reinier 43' | Stadium: Estadio Municipal de Los Cuartos |

== Competitions ==
=== Overall record ===
| Competition | First match | Last match | Starting round | Final position | Record | | | | | | | |
| Competition | First match | Last match | Starting round | Final position | Pld | W | D | L | GF | GA | GD | Win % |
|---|---|---|---|---|---|---|---|---|---|---|---|---|
| Segunda División | 19 August 2024 | 1 June 2025 | Matchday 1 | | 38 | 8 | 11 | 19 | 35 | 51 | −16 | 21.05 |
| Copa del Rey | 31 October 2024 | 4 January 2025 | First round | Round of 32 | 3 | 1 | 1 | 1 | 3 | 2 | +1 | 33.33 |
| Total | | | | | 41 | 9 | 12 | 20 | 38 | 53 | −15 | 21.95 |

Last updated: 4 May 2025
Source: Competitions

=== Segunda División ===
==== League table ====
| Pos | Team | Pld | W | D | L | GF | GA | GD | Pts | Qualification or relegation |
|---|---|---|---|---|---|---|---|---|---|---|
| 18 | Zaragoza | 42 | 13 | 12 | 17 | 56 | 63 | −7 | 51 | |
| 19 | Eldense (R) | 42 | 11 | 12 | 19 | 44 | 63 | −19 | 45 | Relegation to Primera Federación |
| 20 | Tenerife (R) | 42 | 8 | 12 | 22 | 35 | 55 | −20 | 36 | Relegation to Primera Federación |
| 21 | Racing Ferrol (R) | 42 | 6 | 12 | 24 | 22 | 64 | −42 | 30 | Relegation to Primera Federación |
| 22 | Cartagena (R) | 42 | 6 | 5 | 31 | 33 | 78 | −45 | 23 | Relegation to Primera Federación |

Source: LaLiga Hypermotion
Rules for classification: 1) Points; 2) Head-to-head points; 3) Head-to-head goal difference; 4) Goal difference; 5) Goals scored; 6) Fair-play points
(Note: Head-to-head record is used only after all the matches between the teams in question have been played)
(R) Relegated

==== Results summary ====
| Overall | | | | | | | | Home | | | | | | Away | | | | | |
| Pld | W | D | L | GF | GA | GD | Pts | W | D | L | GF | GA | GD | W | D | L | GF | GA | GD |
|---|---|---|---|---|---|---|---|---|---|---|---|---|---|---|---|---|---|---|---|
| 38 | 8 | 11 | 19 | 35 | 51 | −16 | 35 | 7 | 6 | 6 | 21 | 18 | +3 | 1 | 5 | 13 | 14 | 33 | −19 |

Last updated: 4 May 2025.

==== Results by round ====
| Round | 1 | 2 | 3 | 4 | 5 | 6 | 7 | 8 | 9 | 10 | 11 | 12 | 13 | 14 | 15 | 16 | 17 | 18 | 19 |
|---|---|---|---|---|---|---|---|---|---|---|---|---|---|---|---|---|---|---|---|
| Ground | A | H | A | H | A | H | A | H | H | A | H | A | H | H | A | A | H | A | H |
| Result | L | L | D | L | L | D | L | W | L | L | D | D | W | P | L | L | D | L | P |
| Position | | | | | | | | | | | | | | | | | | | |

Updated to match(es) played on 22 December 2024. Source:
A = Away; H = Home; W = Win; D = Draw; L = Loss

==== Matches ====
| 19 August 2024 1 | Eldense | 2–1 | Tenerife | Elda |
| 20:30 UTC+2 | | | | Stadium: Nuevo Pepico Amat |

| 24 August 2024 2 | Tenerife | 0–1 | Almería | Santa Cruz de Tenerife |
| 20:30 UTC+1 | | | | Stadium: Heliodoro Rodríguez López |

| 31 August 2024 3 | Cádiz | 2–2 | Tenerife | Cádiz |
| 19:00 UTC+2 | | | | Stadium: Nuevo Mirandilla |

| 6 September 2024 4 | Tenerife | 0–1 | Racing Santander | Santa Cruz de Tenerife |
| 20:00 UTC+1 | | | | Stadium: Heliodoro Rodríguez López |

| 14 September 2024 5 | Eibar | 1–0 | Tenerife | Eibar |
| 16:15 UTC+2 | | | | Stadium: Ipurua Municipal Stadium |

| 22 September 2024 6 | Tenerife | 1–1 | Sporting Gijón | Santa Cruz de Tenerife |
| 13:00 UTC+1 | | | | Stadium: Heliodoro Rodríguez López |

| 29 September 2024 7 | Castellón | 2–1 | Tenerife | Castellón de la Plana |
| 16:15 UTC+2 | | | | Stadium: Nou Estadi Castàlia |

| 5 October 2024 8 | Tenerife | 2–0 | Cartagena | Santa Cruz de Tenerife |
| 20:00 UTC+1 | | | | Stadium: Heliodoro Rodríguez López |

| 11 October 2024 9 | Tenerife | 2–3 | Zaragoza | Santa Cruz de Tenerife |
| 19:30 UTC+1 | | | | Stadium: Heliodoro Rodríguez López |

| 19 October 2024 10 | Granada | 4–0 | Tenerife | Granada |
| 18:30 UTC+2 | | | | Stadium: Nuevo Estadio de Los Cármenes |

| 24 October 2024 11 | Tenerife | 0–0 | Málaga | Santa Cruz de Tenerife |
| 20:00 UTC+1 | | | | Stadium: Heliodoro Rodríguez López |

| 28 October 2024 12 | Racing Ferrol | 1–1 | Tenerife | Ferrol |
| 20:30 UTC+1 | | | | Stadium: Estadio Municipal da Malata |

| 3 November 2024 13 | Tenerife | 1–0 | Mirandés | Santa Cruz de Tenerife |
| 17:30 UTC+0 | | | | Stadium: Heliodoro Rodríguez López |

| 17 November 2024 15 | Oviedo | 3–1 | Tenerife | Oviedo |
| 16:15 UTC+1 | | | | Stadium: Carlos Tartiere; Referee: Germán Cid Camacho |

| 24 November 2024 16 | Albacete | 2–1 | Tenerife | Albacete |
| 14:00 UTC+1 | Marín 34' (pen.); Morcillo 81' | | Mesa 76' | Stadium: Carlos Belmonte; Referee: Miguel Sesma Espinosa |

| 30 November 2024 17 | Tenerife | 1–1 | Elche | Santa Cruz de Tenerife |
| 20:00 UTC+0 | Diarra 30' | | Kaba 90' | Stadium: Heliodoro Rodríguez López; Referee: Daniel Palencia Caballero |

| 8 December 2024 18 | Córdoba | 3–0 | Tenerife | Córdoba |
| 21:00 UTC+1 | Casas 45'; Adilson 83'; Sala 90+8' | | Rodríguez (penalty missed) 10' | Stadium: Estadio Nuevo Arcángel; Referee: Rafael Sánchez López |

| 19 December 2024 20 | Huesca | 1–0 | Tenerife | Huesca |
| 21:15 UTC+1 | Soko 35' | | | Stadium: El Alcoraz |

| 22 December 2024 21 | Burgos | 1–0 | Tenerife | Burgos |
| 14:00 UTC+2 | Curro 84' | | | Stadium: El Plantío; Referee: Manuel Ángel Pérez Hernández |

| 7 January 2025 14 | Tenerife | 0–3 | Levante | Santa Cruz de Tenerife |
| 20:30 UTC+0 | | | | Stadium: Heliodoro Rodríguez López; Referee: Manuel Jesús Orellana Cid |

| 11 January 2025 22 | Tenerife | 2–0 | Castellón | Santa Cruz de Tenerife |
| 17:30 UTC+1 | | | | Stadium: Heliodoro Rodríguez López; Referee: Carlos Muñiz Muñoz |

| 19 January 2025 23 | Zaragoza | 2–2 | Tenerife | Zaragoza |
| 18:30 UTC+2 | | | | Stadium: La Romareda; Referee: Andrés Fuentes Molina |

| 25 January 2025 24 | Tenerife | 0–1 | Eldense | Santa Cruz de Tenerife |
| 20:00 UTC+0 | | | | Stadium: Heliodoro Rodríguez López |

| 29 January 2025 19 | Tenerife | 0–0 | Deportivo La Coruña | Santa Cruz de Tenerife |
| 20:00 UTC+0 | | | | Stadium: Heliodoro Rodríguez López |

| 2 February 2025 25 | Tenerife | 3–1 | Albacete | Santa Cruz de Tenerife |
| 20:00 UTC+0 | | | | Stadium: Heliodoro Rodríguez López |

| 9 February 2025 26 | Elche | 2–0 | Tenerife | Elche |
| 14:00 UTC+1 |

| 15 February 2025 27 | Tenerife | 2–3 | Córdoba | Santa Cruz de Tenerife |
| 20:00 UTC+0 | | | | Stadium: Heliodoro Rodríguez López |

| 21 February 2025 28 | Málaga | 1–0 | Tenerife | Málaga |
| 20:30 UTC+1 |

| 3 March 2025 29 | Mirandés | 2–0 | Tenerife | Miranda de Ebro |
| 16:15 UTC+1 |

| 9 March 2025 30 | Tenerife | 2–0 | Huesca | Santa Cruz de Tenerife |
| 13:00 UTC+0 | | | | Stadium: Heliodoro Rodríguez López |

| 16 March 2025 31 | Racing Santander | 2–1 | Tenerife | Santander |
| 16:15 UTC+1 |

| 23 March 2025 32 | Tenerife | 2–1 | Cádiz | Santa Cruz de Tenerife |
| 17:30 UTC+0 | | | | Stadium: Heliodoro Rodríguez López |

| 28 March 2025 33 | Tenerife | 2–1 | Granada | Santa Cruz de Tenerife |
| 19:30 UTC+0 | | | | Stadium: Heliodoro Rodríguez López |

| 5 April 2025 34 | Sporting Gijon | 1–3 | Tenerife | Gijón |
| 21:00 UTC+2 | | | | Stadium: El Molinón; Referee: Carlos Muñiz Muñoz |

| 12 April 2025 35 | Tenerife | 0–0 | Burgos | Santa Cruz de Tenerife |
| 17:30 UTC+1 | | | | Stadium: Heliodoro Rodríguez López; Referee: Manuel Jesús Orellana Cid |

| 20 April 2025 36 | Deportivo La Coruña | 0–0 | Tenerife | A Coruña |
| 21:00 UTC+2 | | | | Stadium: Estadio Riazor; Referee: Oliver de la Fuente Ramos |

| 27 April 2025 37 | Tenerife | 1–1 | Eibar | Santa Cruz de Tenerife |
| 17:30 UTC+0 | | | | Stadium: Heliodoro Rodríguez López |

| 4 May 2025 38 | Levante | 1–1 | Tenerife | Valencia |
| 14:00 UTC+1 | | | | Stadium: Estadi Ciutat de València |

| 11 May 2025 39 | Tenerife | v | Racing Ferrol | Santa Cruz de Tenerife |
| 20:00 UTC+0 | | | | Stadium: Heliodoro Rodríguez López |

=== Copa del Rey ===
| 31 October 2024 First round | Alfaro | 0–2 (a.e.t.) | Tenerife | Alfaro |
| 21:00 | Pérez (yellow card) 61' (yellow-red card) 112'; León (yellow card) 81' (yellow-red card) 106'; Parada (yellow card) 85'; Losantos (yellow card) 111'; Soeiro (yellow card) 120' | | Rodríguez (yellow card) 49'; Senhadji (yellow card) 57'; Gallego (penalty missed) 108', (red card) 118'; González 113' (pen.), 120+1' | Stadium: Estadio La Molineta; Referee: Carlos Muñiz Muñoz |

| 4 December 2024 Second round | Zamora | 0–0 (a.e.t.) (1–3 p) | Tenerife | Zamora |
| 21:00 | Macho (yellow card) 28'; Márquez (yellow card) 46'; Campabadal (yellow card) 70'; González (yellow card) 93' | | Teto (yellow card) 73'; Bodiger (yellow card) 84'; Gayá (yellow card) 93' (yellow-red card) 105' | Stadium: Estadio Ruta de la Plata; Referee: Miguel González Díaz |
| | Penalties |
| | Ramos (penalty missed); González (penalty missed); Macho (penalty scored); Márquez (penalty missed) | | (penalty scored) Romero; (penalty missed) Ethyan; (penalty scored) Alassan; (penalty scored) Guerrero |

| 4 January 2025 Round of 32 | Tenerife | 1–2 | Osasuna | Santa Cruz de Tenerife |
| 15:30 UTC+0 | | | | Stadium: Heliodoro Rodríguez López; Referee: Juan Martínez Munuera |
