= 2023–24 CD Tenerife season =

CD Tenerife
2023–24 season
- President: Paulino Rivero
- Head coach: Asier Garitano
- Stadium: Estadio Heliodoro Rodríguez López
- Segunda División: 12th
- Copa del Rey: Round of 16
- Top goalscorer: League: Ángel Rodríguez (10); All: Ángel Rodríguez (10)
- Highest home attendance: 19,102
- Average home league attendance: 15,242
Home colours	Away colours

The 2023–24 season was Club Deportivo Tenerife's 112th season in existence and 11th consecutive in the Segunda División, the second division of association football in Spain. They also competed in the Copa del Rey.

== Players ==
=== First-team squad ===
As of 11 September 2023.

Note: Flags indicate national team as defined under FIFA eligibility rules; some limited exceptions apply. Players may hold more than one non-FIFA nationality.

No.	Pos.	Nation	Player
1	GK	ESP	Juan Soriano
2	DF	ESP	Aitor Buñuel
3	DF	ESP	Fernando Medrano
4	DF	ESP	José León
5	DF	ESP	Sergio González
6	DF	ESP	José María Amo
7	FW	ESP	Elady Zorrilla
8	MF	ESP	Javi Alonso
9	FW	ESP	Ángel Rodríguez
10	MF	ESP	Álex Corredera
11	FW	GHA	Mo Dauda
13	GK	ESP	Tomeu Nadal

No.	Pos.	Nation	Player
14	MF	ESP	Roberto López (on loan from Real Sociedad)
15	MF	FRA	Yann Bodiger
16	MF	ESP	Aitor Sanz (captain)
17	MF	ESP	Waldo Rubio
18	FW	ESP	Enric Gallego
19	MF	ESP	Álvaro Romero
20	MF	ESP	Pablo Hernández
21	FW	ESP	Teto
22	DF	FRA	Jérémy Mellot
23	DF	MNE	Nikola Šipčić
24	DF	ESP	Nacho Martínez
27	MF	ESP	Luismi Cruz (on loan from Sevilla)

=== Reserve team ===
Note: Flags indicate national team as defined under FIFA eligibility rules; some limited exceptions apply. Players may hold more than one non-FIFA nationality.

No.	Pos.	Nation	Player
28	FW	ESP	Alassan
30	GK	ESP	Moha Ramos
31	DF	ESP	Loïc Williams

No.	Pos.	Nation	Player
32	FW	ESP	Jesús Belza
41	GK	ESP	Martín Cascajo
—	FW	ESP	Ethyan González

=== Out on loan ===
Note: Flags indicate national team as defined under FIFA eligibility rules; some limited exceptions apply. Players may hold more than one non-FIFA nationality.

No.	Pos.	Nation	Player
—	GK	ESP	Javi Díaz (at Fuenlabrada until 30 June 2024)
—	DF	ESP	David Rodríguez (at Antequera until 30 June 2024)
—	DF	ESP	Jeremy Socorro (at Antequera until 30 June 2024)

No.	Pos.	Nation	Player
—	MF	ESP	Rubén Díez (at Ibiza until 30 June 2024)
—	FW	ESP	Dani Selma (at San Fernando until 30 June 2024)
—	FW	ESP	Jorge Padilla (at Mérida until 30 June 2024)

== Transfers ==
=== In ===
Pos.	Player	Transferred from	Fee	Date	Source

=== Out ===
Pos.	Player	Transferred to	Fee	Date	Source

== Pre-season and friendlies ==
Win Draw Loss Fixtures

22 July 2023 Friendly	Tenerife	0–1	Mensajero	La Laguna
11:00 WEST (UTC+1)			Arteaga 90'	Stadium: Ciudad Deportiva Javier Pérez

26 July 2023 Friendly	Alavés	1–0	Tenerife	Benidorm
19:00 CEST (UTC+2)	Sylla 85'			Stadium: Melia Villaitana Football Center; Referee: Sergiu Muresan

29 July 2023 Friendly	Elche	1–0	Tenerife	Elche
09:30 CEST (UTC+2)	Fernández 22'			Stadium: Estadio Martínez Valero

2 August 2023 Friendly	Eldense	0–0	Tenrife	La Nucía
19:00 CEST (UTC+2)				Stadium: Estadi Olímpic Camilo Cano; Attendance: 800; Referee: Jorge Tárraga Lajara

5 August 2023 Teide Trophy	Tenerife	2–0	Villarreal B	La Orotava
20:00 WEST (UTC+1)	Alassan 31'; Williams 34'			Stadium: Estadio Municipal Los Cuartos; Referee: Juan Luis Pulido Santana

== Competitions ==
=== Overall record ===
Competition	First match	Last match	Starting round	Record							
Competition	First match	Last match	Starting round	Pld	W	D	L	GF	GA	GD	Win %
Segunda División	14 August 2023	May 2024	Matchday 1	9	6	0	3	10	6	+4	66.67
Copa del Rey	1 November 2023		First round	0	0	0	0	0	0	+0	—
Total				9	6	0	3	10	6	+4	66.67

Last updated: 3 October 2023
Source: Soccerway

=== Segunda División ===
==== League table ====
Pos	Team	Pld	W	D	L	GF	GA	GD	Pts
10	Racing Ferrol	42	15	14	13	49	52	−3	59 (Note: Levante finished ahead of Burgos, Racing Ferrol, and Elche on head-to-head points: Levante 12 pts, Burgos 8 pts, Racing Ferrol 8 pts, Elche 4 pts. Burgos finished ahead of Racing Ferrol on head-to-head points: Racing Ferrol 1–1 Burgos, Burgos 2–0 Racing Ferrol)
11	Elche	42	16	11	15	43	46	−3	59
12	Tenerife	42	15	11	16	38	41	−3	56
13	Albacete	42	12	15	15	50	56	−6	51 (Note: Albacete finished ahead of Cartagena and Zaragoza on head-to-head points: Albacete 6 pts, Cartagena 5 pts, Zaragoza 4 pts)
14	Cartagena	42	14	9	19	37	51	−14	51

Updated to match(es) played on 2 Jun 2024. Source: LaLiga HyperMotion
Rules for classification: 1) Points; 2) Head-to-head points; 3) Head-to-head goal difference; 4) Goal difference; 5) Goals scored; 6) Fair-play points
(Note: Head-to-head record is used only after all the matches between the teams in question have been played)

==== Results summary ====
Overall								Home						Away					
Pld	W	D	L	GF	GA	GD	Pts	W	D	L	GF	GA	GD	W	D	L	GF	GA	GD
42	15	11	16	38	41	−3	56	11	5	5	20	11	+9	4	6	11	18	30	−12

Source: LALIGA HYPERMOTION

==== Results by round ====
Round	1	2	3	4	5	6	7	8	9
Ground	H	A	H	A	H	A	H	A	H
Result	W	W	L	W	W	L	W	L	W
Position	7	1	6	4	4	4	3		

Updated to match(es) played on 3 October 2023. Source: LALIGA HYPERMOTION
A = Away; H = Home; W = Win; D = Draw; L = Loss

==== Matches ====
The league fixtures were unveiled on 28 June 2023.

14 August 2023 1	Tenerife	1–0	Oviedo	Santa Cruz de Tenerife
20:30 WEST (UTC+1)	Gallego 18'	Report		Stadium: Estadio Heliodoro Rodríguez López; Attendance: 15,861; Referee: Saúl Ais Reig

21 August 2023 2	Huesca	0–2	Tenerife	Huesca
21:30 CEST (UTC+2)		Report	López 14'; Gallego (yellow card) 24'; Corredera (yellow card) 45'; Medrano (yellow card) 46'; Rubio 50'; Cruz (yellow card) 57'	Stadium: El Alcoraz; Attendance: 5,434; Referee: José Antonio López Toca

26 August 2023 3	Tenerife	0–1	Zaragoza	Santa Cruz de Tenerife
18:00 WEST (UTC+1)		Report	Amador 69'	Stadium: Estadio Heliodoro Rodríguez López; Attendance: 18,801; Referee: Jon Ander González Esteban

3 September 2023 4	Andorra	0–1	Tenerife	Andorra la Vella
14:00 CEST (UTC+2)		Report	López (yellow card) 36'; Amo (yellow card) 44'; Medrano (yellow card) 56'; Cruz 76'	Stadium: Estadi Nacional; Attendance: 2,010; Referee: Salvador Lax Franco

9 September 2023 5	Tenerife	2–0	Albacete	Santander
20:00 WEST (UTC+1)	Gallego 17' (pen.); López 36'	Report		Stadium: Campos de Sport de El Sardinero; Attendance: 17,560; Referee: Andrés Fuentes Molina

17 September 2023 6	Sporting Gijón	2–1	Tenerife	Gijón
21:00 CEST (UTC+2)	Campos 21'; Insua 90+4'	Report	López 13'	Stadium: El Molinón; Attendance: 15,792; Referee: Luis Mario Milla Alvendiz

25 September 2023 7	Tenerife	1–0	Espanyol	Santa Cruz de Tenerife
20:00 WEST (UTC+1)	Gallego 16'	Report		Stadium: Estadio Heliodoro Rodríguez López; Attendance: 18,161; Referee: Dámaso Arcediano Monescillo

30 September 2023 8	Eibar	3–0	Tenerife	Eibar
16:15 CEST (UTC+2)	Stoichkov 59'; González 66', (yellow card) 66'; Corpas (yellow card) 71'; Qasmi (yellow card) 89'; Vencedor 90+1'	Report	Amo (yellow card) 48'	Stadium: Ipurua Municipal Stadium; Attendance: 4,754; Referee: José Luis Guzmán Mansilla

3 October 2023 9	Tenerife	2–0	Racing Santander	Santa Cruz de Tenerife
20:30 WEST (UTC+1)	Ángel 63' (pen.), 65'	Report		Stadium: Estadio Heliodoro Rodríguez López; Referee: Rafael Sánchez López

25 February 2024 28	Alcorcón	v	Tenerife	Alcorcón
16:15				Stadium: Estadio Municipal de Santo Domingo

21 April 2024 36	Tenerife	v	Leganés	Santa Cruz de Tenerife
				Stadium: Estadio Heliodoro Rodríguez López

28 April 2024 37	Oviedo	v	Tenerife	Oviedo
				Stadium: Estadio Carlos Tartiere

5 May 2024 38	Tenerife	v	Racing Ferrol	Santa Cruz de Tenerife
				Stadium: Estadio Heliodoro Rodríguez López

12 May 2024 39	Cartagena	v	Tenerife	Cartagena
				Stadium: Cartagonova

19 May 2024 40	Tenerife	v	Amorebieta	Santa Cruz de Tenerife
				Stadium: Estadio Heliodoro Rodríguez López

26 May 2024 41	Burgos	v	Tenerife	Burgos
				Stadium: El Plantío

2 June 2024 42	Tenerife	v	Valladolid	Santa Cruz de Tenerife
				Stadium: Estadio Heliodoro Rodríguez López

=== Copa del Rey ===
1 November 2023 First round	Compostela	0–1	Tenerife	Santiago de Compostela
12:00		Report	Ángel 10'	Stadium: San Lázaro; Attendance: 2,503; Referee: Germán Cid Camacho

6 December 2023 Second round	Deportivo La Coruña	2–3 (a.e.t.)	Tenerife	A Coruña
12:00	Mella 10'; Sánchez 106'	Report	Nacho 60'; Romero 101'; González 120+2'	Stadium: Riazor; Attendance: 18,549; Referee: Luis Mario Milla Alvéndiz

7 January 2024 Round of 32	Tenerife	2–0	Las Palmas	Santa Cruz de Tenerife
20:00 WET	Amo 4'; Luismi 21'	Report		Stadium: Heliodoro Rodríguez López; Referee: Jon Núñez Fernández

16 January 2024 Round of 16	Tenerife	0–1 (a.e.t.)	Mallorca	Santa Cruz de Tenerife
21:00 WET (UTC+0)	Jiménez (yellow card) 96'	Report	Amath (yellow card) 36'; Raíllo (yellow card) 72'; Mascarell (yellow card) 79'; Llabrés (yellow card) 97'; Rodríguez (yellow card) 99'; González (yellow card) 105+2'; Larin 120'	Stadium: Heliodoro Rodríguez López; Attendance: 20,176; Referee: Mario Melero López
