= 2026–27 U.D. Leiria season =

União de Leiria
2026–27 season
- Manager: Fábio Pereira
- Stadium: Estádio Dr. Magalhães Pessoa
- Liga Portugal 2: 5th
- Taça de Portugal: Pre-season

The 2026–27 season is the 61st season in the history of União Desportiva de Leiria and their fourth consecutive season in Liga Portugal 2. The club will also compete in the Taça de Portugal.

== Transfers ==
=== In ===
Pos.	Player	Transferred from	Fee	Date	Source
GK	(Spain) Salvi Carrasco	(Spain) Unionistas de Salamanca	Loan return	30 June 2026	
MF	(France) Albert Lottin	(Spain) CD Castellón	Undisclosed	1 July 2026	
MF	(Portugal) Reko	(Portugal) Penafiel	Free	2 July 2026	
MF	(Brazil) Tharlley	(Spain) FC Oliveira do Hospital	Loan	2 July 2026	
MF	(Portugal) Martim Almeida	(Portugal) Famalicão U23	Free	3 July 2026	
MF	(France) Guirassy	(Portugal) Marítimo	Free	3 July 2026	
GK	(Spain) Yago Moreira	(Spain) FC Villarreal C	Undisclosed	3 July 2026	
FW	(Bulgaria) Borislav Rupanov	(Poland) Górnik Zabrze	Loan	3 July 2026	
DF	(Belarus) Leo Mascaró	(Spain) Recreativo de Huelva	Free	5 July 2026	
GK	(Cuba) Christian Joel	(Spain) Sporting de Gijón	Free	9 July 2026	
FW	(Democratic Republic of the Congo) Samuel Ntanda	(Belgium) RSCA Futures	Undisclosed	1 August 2026	
DF	(Belgium) Hugo Masaki	(Spain) K. Lierse S.K.	Undisclosed	14 August 2026	
FW	(Portugal) Jaiminho	(Portugal) Farense	Free	22 August 2026	
MF	(France) Damien Loppy	(Portugal) Vizela	Undisclosed	4 September 2026	
DF	(Portugal) Miguel Nóbrega	(Portugal) Vitória de Guimarães	Loan	4 September 2026	
FW	(Brazil) Victor Silva	(Brazil) Ferroviária	Undisclosed	4 September 2026	
DF	(Spain) Kikín	(Spain) Atlético Sanluqueño	Undisclosed	5 September 2026	

=== Out ===
Pos.	Player	Transferred to	Fee	Date	Source
GK	(Spain) Salvi Carrasco	(Spain) Real Jaén	Free	7 July 2026	

== Competitions ==
=== Liga Portugal 2 ===
Pos	Team	Pld	W	D	L	GF	GA	GD	Pts	Promotion, qualification or relegation
4	Vizela	6	3	2	1	7	4	+3	11	Qualification for the Promotion play-off
5	Benfica B (Note: Ineligible for promotion)	6	3	1	2	7	5	+2	10	
6	União de Leiria	6	3	1	2	10	7	+3	10	
7	Leixões	6	3	1	2	8	6	+2	10	
8	Académica	6	3	0	3	8	10	−2	9	

Updated to match(es) played on 14 September 2026. Source: Liga Portugal
Rules for classification: 1) Points; 2) Head-to-head points; 3) Head-to-head goal difference; 4) Goal difference; 5) Matches won; 6) Goals scored; 7) Play-off.

==== Results by round ====
Round	1	2	3	4	5
Ground	A	H	A	H	H
Result	L	L	W	W	W
Position					

Updated to match(es) played on 6 September 2026. Source:
A = Away; H = Home; W = Win; D = Draw; L = Loss

==== Matches ====
9 August 2026 1	Vizela	1–0	União de Leiria
14:00 UTC+1

15 August 2026 2	União de Leiria	1–2	Benfica B	Leiria
14:00 UTC+1				Stadium: Estádio Dr. Magalhães Pessoa

22 August 2026 3	Leixões	2–4	União de Leiria
11:00 UTC+1

28 August 2026 4	União de Leiria	2–0	Tondela	Leiria
18:00 UTC+1				Stadium: Estádio Dr. Magalhães Pessoa

6 September 2026 5	União de Leiria	1–0	Portimonense	Leiria
18:00 UTC+1	Ondo 44'		Nakajima (penalty missed) 30	Stadium: Estádio Dr. Magalhães Pessoa
