= Ayoze Placeres =

Spanish footballer

Personal information
- Full name: Ayoze Placeres Delgado
- Date of birth: 31 July 1991 (age 35)
- Place of birth: Santa Cruz de Tenerife, Spain
- Height: 1.88 m (6 ft 2 in)
- Position: Centre back

Team information
- Current team: Mensajero

Youth career
- Tenerife

Senior career*
Years	Team	Apps	(Gls)
2010–2012	Tenerife B	53	(6)
2010–2011	Tenerife C	3	(0)
2011–2013	Tenerife	14	(0)
2013	→ Marino (loan)	17	(0)
2013–2015	Las Palmas B	68	(2)
2015–2016	Cartagena	26	(2)
2016–2017	Mérida	25	(2)
2017–2018	Burgos	21	(0)
2018–2020	Unionistas	39	(1)
2020–2021	Yeclano Deportivo	18	(0)
2021–2022	Ebro	32	(0)
2022–2025	Atlético Paso	76	(5)
2025	Unión Sur Yaiza	9	(0)
2025–	Mensajero	2	(0)
- * Club domestic league appearances and goals as of 13 September 2025

Ayoze Placeres Delgado (born 31 July 1991) is a Spanish footballer who plays for Tercera Federación club Mensajero as a centre-back.

== Football career ==
Born in Santa Cruz de Tenerife, Canary Islands, Placeres finished his graduation with CD Tenerife's youth setup, and made his senior debuts with the reserves in the 2010–11 season, in Tercera División. On 21 May 2011 he made his official debut with the first team, starting and playing the full 90 minutes in a 2–1 away success over Albacete Balompié, in the Segunda División championship.

On 24 January 2013 Placeres was loaned to CD Marino, in Segunda División B. He subsequently resumed his career in that category, representing UD Las Palmas Atlético, FC Cartagena, Mérida AD, Burgos CF and Unionistas de Salamanca CF.
