= Dylan Perera =

Spanish footballer

Personal information
- Full name: Dylan José Perera Plasencia
- Date of birth: 12 May 2003 (age 23)
- Place of birth: Santa Cruz de Tenerife, Spain
- Height: 1.73 m (5 ft 8 in)
- Position: Attacking midfielder

Team information
- Current team: Tenerife
- Number: 28

Youth career
- San José
- 2013–2020: Tenerife

Senior career*
Years	Team	Apps	(Gls)
2020–2021	Tenerife C	4	(1)
2020–	Tenerife B	125	(14)
2020–	Tenerife	4	(0)
- * Club domestic league appearances and goals as of 16 May 2026

Dylan José Perera Plasencia (born 12 May 2003), sometimes known simply as Dylan, is a Spanish professional footballer who plays as an attacking midfielder for CD Tenerife.

== Club career ==
Born in Santa Cruz de Tenerife, Canary Islands, Perera joined CD Tenerife's youth setup in 2013, from SD San José. He made his senior debut with the C-team on 24 October 2020, starting in a 2–1 Interinsular Preferente de Tenerife away loss against UD Las Zocas.

Perera first appeared with the reserves in Tercera División on 8 November 2020, in a 1–2 loss at CD Mensajero. Six days later, he scored his first senior goal, netting the C's third in a 5–2 home routing of Real Unión Tenerife, and started training with the main squad late in the month.

On 15 December 2020, at the age of 17 years, 7 months, and 3 days, Perera made his first team debut, coming on as a substitute for fellow youth graduate Javi Alonso in the extra time of a 2–0 away success over Sestao River Club, for the season's Copa del Rey. The following 21 July, he renewed his contract until 2025.

After helping the B-team in their promotion to Segunda Federación, Perera made his professional debut for Tete on 26 May 2024, replacing José María Amo late into a 1–1 Segunda División away draw against Burgos CF.
