= Julio Hormiga =

Spanish footballer

Personal information
- Full name: Julio Alberto González Hormiga
- Date of birth: 30 March 1985 (age 41)
- Place of birth: Santa Cruz de Tenerife, Spain
- Height: 1.83 m (6 ft 0 in)
- Position: Midfielder

Youth career
- Tenerife

Senior career*
Years	Team	Apps	(Gls)
2001–2003	Tenerife B		
2003–2008	Tenerife	53	(1)

International career
2004	Spain U19	1	(1)
- * Club domestic league appearances and goals

Julio Alberto González Hormiga (born 30 March 1985 in Santa Cruz de Tenerife, Canary Island) is a Spanish retired footballer who played as a midfielder for CD Tenerife, in Spain's Segunda División.
