= Ayoze =

Ayoze is a given name of Canarian origin. Notable people with the name include:

- Ayoze Díaz Díaz (born 1982), Spanish association football left back and manager
- Ayoze García (born 1985), Spanish association football left back playing in the United States
- Ayoze Pérez (born 1993), Spanish association football forward
- Ayoze Placeres (born 1991), Spanish association football defender
