= Ángel Galván =

Spanish footballer (born 1993)

Personal information
- Full name: Ángel Jesús Galván Rivero
- Date of birth: 16 April 1993 (age 33)
- Place of birth: Santa Cruz de Tenerife, Spain
- Height: 1.89 m (6 ft 2 in)
- Position: Goalkeeper

Team information
- Current team: Ibarra

Youth career
- Laguna
- 2006–2012: Tenerife

Senior career*
Years	Team	Apps	(Gls)
2012–2018	Tenerife B	111	(0)
2013–2014	→ Getafe B (loan)	21	(0)
2014–2015	→ Racing Ferrol (loan)	2	(0)
2018–2020	Tenerife	1	(0)
2020	Rayo Majadahonda	1	(0)
2020–2021	Marino	15	(0)
2022	Pulpileño	6	(0)
2023–	Ibarra	29	(0)
- * Club domestic league appearances and goals as of 5 October 2024

Ángel Jesús Galván Rivero (born 16 April 1993) is a Spanish professional footballer who plays for Ibarra as a goalkeeper.

== Club career ==
Born in Santa Cruz de Tenerife, Canary Islands, Galván joined CD Tenerife's youth setup in 2006, from AD Laguna, and made his debut with the reserves in 2012, in Tercera División. On 18 July 2013 he moved to another reserve team, Getafe CF B in Segunda División B, on a two-year loan deal.

On 8 August 2014, Galván was loaned to fellow third tier club Racing de Ferrol, for one year. A backup to Ian Mackay during the season, he returned to the Blanquiazules' B-team after his loan ended.

On 7 June 2017, Galván renewed his contract until 2020, being promoted to the main squad on 25 June of the following year. He made his professional debut on 12 September, starting in a 1–2 home loss against Cádiz CF, for the season's Copa del Rey.

On 9 January 2020, Galván terminated his contract with the Blanquiazules, and joined CF Rayo Majadahonda in the third division on 14 February. He left the club on 5 September 2020 to join CD Marino.
