= Thierno Barry =

Thierno Barry may refer to:

- Thierno Barry (footballer, born 2000), Guinean football winger for Akritas Chlorakas
- Thierno Barry (footballer, born 2002), French football striker for Everton

== See also ==
- Mamadou Thierno Barry (born 2005), Senegalese football centre-back for Union Saint-Gilloise
