= Nadjib Mengoud =

Spanish footballer

Nadjib
Personal information
- Full name: Nadjib Mengoud Montes
- Date of birth: 25 May 1996 (age 30)
- Place of birth: Barcelona, Spain
- Height: 1.74 m (5 ft 8 1/2 in)
- Position: Attacking midfielder

Team information
- Current team: Lanzarote

Youth career
- Valterra
- 2010–2012: Torrelavega
- 2012–2014: Tahíche
- 2014–2015: Tenerife

Senior career*
Years	Team	Apps	(Gls)
2014–2020	Tenerife B	58	(4)
2015–2020	Tenerife	3	(0)
2017	→ Murcia (loan)	3	(0)
2018	→ Badalona (loan)	0	(0)
2020–2021	Marino	16	(1)
2022–2024	San Bartolomé	23	(5)
2024–	Lanzarote	5	(1)
- * Club domestic league appearances and goals as of 12 October 2024

Nadjib Mengoud Montes (born 25 May 1996), simply known as Nadjib, is a Spanish footballer of Algerian origin who plays for Lanzarote as an attacking midfielder.

== Club career ==
Born in Barcelona, Catalonia, Nadjib joined CD Tenerife's youth setup in 2014, after stints at UD Valterra, SCRD Torrelavega and CD Tahíche. He made his debuts as a senior with the former's reserve team in the 2014–15 campaign, in Tercera División.

On 23 August 2015 Nadjib made his first-team debut, coming on as a second-half substitute for Suso Santana in a 3–6 away loss against CD Numancia in the Segunda División. On 31 August 2017, he was loaned to Segunda División B club Real Murcia, for one year.

On 27 July 2018, Nadjib was loaned to CF Badalona in the third division, but the club terminated the loan deal on 6 September.
