= Ibra Barry =

Spanish footballer (born 2002)

Personal information
- Full name: Ibrahima José Barry Pérez
- Date of birth: 1 May 2002 (age 24)
- Place of birth: Santa Cruz de Tenerife, Spain
- Height: 1.77 m (5 ft 10 in)
- Position: Midfielder

Youth career
- Tenerife

Senior career*
Years	Team	Apps	(Gls)
2021–2022	Tenerife C	12	(1)
2022–2023	Tenerife B	9	(0)
2022–2023	Tenerife	1	(0)
2023–2024	Buzanada	27	(3)
2024–2025	San Miguel	25	(6)
- * Club domestic league appearances and goals as of 11 May 2026

Ibrahima José "Ibra" Barry Pérez (born 1 May 2002) is a Spanish footballer who plays as a midfielder.

== Club career ==
Born in Santa Cruz de Tenerife, Canary Islands to a Spanish mother and a Guinean father, Barry was a CD Tenerife youth graduate. In April 2021, while still a youth, he suffered a serious knee injury, being sidelined for more than a year.

In 2021, Barry started to feature as a senior with the C-team in the regional leagues, later playing for the reserves in Tercera Federación and then renewing his contract. He made his first team debut on 3 September 2022, coming on as a second-half substitute for Carlos Ruiz in a 1–0 Segunda División home win over Racing de Santander.
