= Fernando Medrano =

Fernando Medrano may refer to:

- Fernando Medrano (swimmer) (born 1988), Nicaraguan swimmer
- Fernando Medrano (footballer) (born 2000), Spanish footballer
