= Thierno Barry (footballer, born 2000) =

Guinean footballer

Personal information
- Full name: Thierno Issiaga Barry Arévalo
- Date of birth: 12 January 2000 (age 26)
- Place of birth: Santa Cruz de Tenerife, Spain
- Height: 1.73 m (5 ft 8 in)
- Position: Winger

Team information
- Current team: Akritas Chlorakas (on loan from Krasava Ypsonas)

Youth career
- Tenerife

Senior career*
Years	Team	Apps	(Gls)
2018–2019	Tenerife C		
2019–2022	Tenerife B	69	(9)
2021–2023	Tenerife	2	(0)
2022–2023	→ Logroñés (loan)	9	(0)
2023–2024	Pafos	0	(0)
2023–2024	→ Akritas Chlorakas (loan)	22	(10)
2024–2025	Enosis Neon Paralimni	12	(1)
2025	→ Cherno More (loan)	15	(0)
2025–	Krasava Ypsonas	2	(0)
2025–	→ Akritas Chlorakas (loan)	16	(1)

International career^{‡}
2022–	Guinea	6	(0)
- * Club domestic league appearances and goals as of 14 June 2026 ‡ National team caps and goals as of 05:40, 26 March 2022 (UTC)

Thierno Issiaga Barry Arévalo (born 12 January 2000), sometimes known just as Thierno, is a footballer who plays mainly as a left winger for Akritas Chlorakas, on loan from Krasava Ypsonas. Born in Spain, he plays for the Guinea national team.

== Club career ==
Born in Santa Cruz de Tenerife, Canary Islands to a Guinean father and a Spanish mother, Thierno was a CD Tenerife youth graduate, and made his senior debut with the C-team in the 2018–19 season, in the regional leagues. Ahead of the 2019–20 campaign, he was promoted to the reserves in Tercera División.

On 23 April 2021, Thierno signed a new three-year contract with Tete. He made his first team debut on 4 September, coming on as a late substitute for Álex Corredera in a 2–0 Segunda División home win over SD Ponferradina.

On 1 September 2022, Thierno was loaned to Primera Federación side SD Logroñés for the season.

== International career ==
On 19 March 2022, Thierno was called up to the Guinea national team by manager Kaba Diawara for friendlies against South Africa and Zambia. He made his full international debut six days later, starting in a 0–0 draw with the former at the Guldensporen Stadion in Kortrijk, Belgium.
