= Borja Llarena =

Spanish footballer

Personal information
- Full name: Borja Manuel Llarena Barroso
- Date of birth: 17 May 1999 (age 27)
- Place of birth: Santa Cruz de Tenerife, Spain
- Height: 1.71 m (5 ft 7 in)
- Position: Forward

Youth career
- Cardonal Laguna
- 2011–2018: Tenerife

Senior career*
Years	Team	Apps	(Gls)
2017–2020	Tenerife B	48	(16)
2018–2022	Tenerife	8	(0)
2020–2021	→ Marino (loan)	24	(2)
2021–2022	→ Costa Brava (loan)	3	(0)
2022	→ Gernika (loan)	6	(0)
2022–2023	Las Palmas B	2	(1)
2023–2024	Akritas Chlorakas	13	(0)
2024	Cazalegas	6	(0)
- * Club domestic league appearances and goals as of 20 June 2024

Borja Manuel Llarena Barroso (born 17 May 1999) is a Spanish footballer who plays as a forward.

== Club career ==
Born in Santa Cruz de Tenerife, Canary Islands, Llarena joined CD Tenerife's youth setup in 2011, from AD Cardonal Laguna. He made his debut as a senior with the reserves during the 2017–18 campaign, appearing for the side during the Copa Federación de España.

On 21 January 2018 Llarena made his first team debut, coming on as a late substitute for Juan Carlos in a 1–3 home loss against FC Barcelona B in the Segunda División championship. On 26 September 2020, he was loaned to Segunda División B side CD Marino for the season.
