= Fran Sol =

Spanish footballer (born 1992)

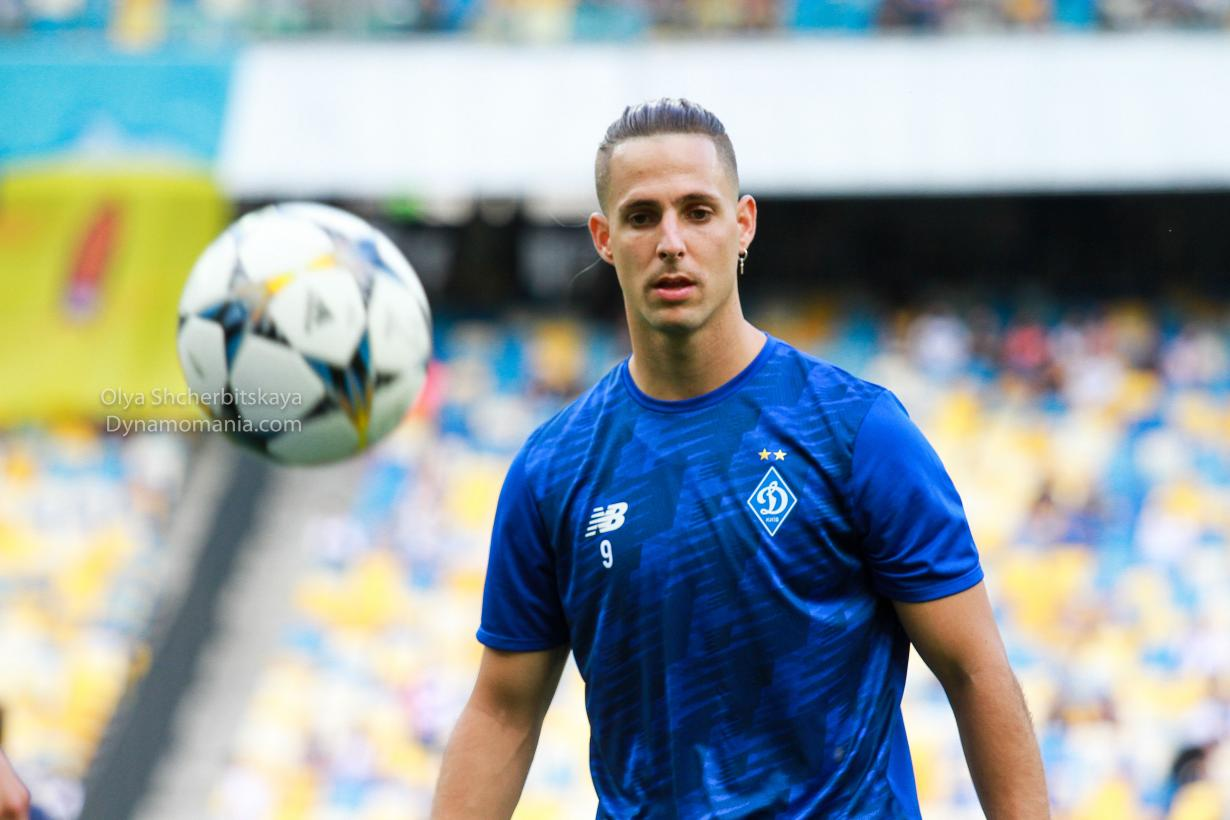
- Sol with Dynamo Kyiv in 2019

Personal information
- Full name: Francisco Sol Ortiz
- Date of birth: 13 March 1992 (age 34)
- Place of birth: Madrid, Spain
- Height: 1.82 m (6 ft 0 in)
- Position: Forward

Team information
- Current team: Hércules
- Number: 19

Youth career
- 1998–2000: AV Vicálvaro
- 2000–2002: Rayo Vallecano
- 2002–2010: Real Madrid

Senior career*
| Years | Team | Apps | (Gls) |
| 2010–2014 | Real Madrid C | 62 | (33) |
| 2012–2013 | → Lugo (loan) | 12 | (1) |
| 2013 | → Oviedo (loan) | 10 | (0) |
| 2014–2016 | Villarreal B | 71 | (27) |
| 2015 | Villarreal | 2 | (0) |
| 2016–2018 | Willem II | 79 | (39) |
| 2019–2023 | Dynamo Kyiv | 17 | (2) |
| 2020–2021 | → Tenerife (loan) | 38 | (10) |
| 2021–2022 | → Eibar (loan) | 29 | (5) |
| 2022–2023 | → Málaga (loan) | 32 | (3) |
| 2023–2025 | AEK Larnaca | 63 | (20) |
| 2025– | Hércules | 35 | (10) |
- * Club domestic league appearances and goals as of 10 June 2026

Francisco "Fran" Sol Ortiz (born 13 March 1992) is a Spanish professional footballer who plays as a forward for Primera Federación club Hércules.

He played for Real Madrid and Villarreal early in his career, spending nearly all of that time out on loan or in reserve teams. He had 2 1/2 successful years with Willem II of the Dutch Eredivisie, totalling 88 matches and 47 goals. His four-year spell at Dynamo Kyiv was mostly spent in his country's Segunda División.

== Club career ==
=== Real Madrid ===
Born in Madrid, Sol joined Real Madrid's youth system in July 2002 at the age of 10, and began playing with the Alevín B-team. In the 2010–11 season, he made his senior debut with Real Madrid C, in a match against CF Trival Valderas in the Tercera División.

For the 2012–13 campaign, Sol was loaned to CD Lugo. He made his professional debut on 25 August 2012, coming on as a substitute for Mauro Quiroga in the 77th minute of a 1–1 away draw against UD Las Palmas. Early into the following month, he made his first start in the Segunda División, helping his team to the same result at Sporting de Gijón.

On 14 December 2012, Sol scored the 3–2 game winner against Real Madrid Castilla. On 16 January of the following year, however, his loan spell was ended and he joined Real Oviedo of the Segunda División B, in the same situation. He made his debut with the Asturians on 20 January 2013, replacing Diego Cervero for the last minutes of the away match against CF Fuenlabrada.

=== Villarreal ===
Sol moved to Villarreal CF's reserves on 2 July 2014. On 25 April 2015, he appeared in his first competitive game with the Valencians' main squad, replacing Jaume Costa in a 0–0 La Liga draw at Real Sociedad.

=== Willem II ===
Sol moved abroad for the first time on 25 June 2016, signing a three-year deal at Eredivisie club Willem II and scoring on his debut on 6 August, a 1–4 home defeat to SBV Vitesse; two weeks later he netted the winner in a 2–1 victory at AFC Ajax, his team's first win there in history.

In October 2017, Sol underwent an operation to remove a testicular tumour. The following 10 March, he scored a hat-trick in a 5–0 win over league leaders PSV Eindhoven at the Koning Willem II Stadion, putting him on top of the season's goalscoring charts.

Sol scored another three goals on 26 August 2018 in a victory by the same score over Heracles Almelo. Across his 30-month stay in the Netherlands he was the top flight's highest goalscorer with 39, five ahead of nearest rival Luuk de Jong.

=== Dynamo Kyiv ===
In January 2019, Sol signed for FC Dynamo Kyiv of the Ukrainian Premier League for an estimated €3 million fee. He made his debut on 14 February away to Olympiacos F.C. in the last 32 of the UEFA Europa League, starting in a 2–2 draw. On his maiden league appearance 11 days later, he scored in a 5–0 home win over FC Zorya Luhansk. His debut season was ended in the next match against FC Desna Chernihiv, due to a shoulder injury.

Sol returned to Spain and its second division on 2 October 2020, after agreeing to a one-year loan contract with CD Tenerife. The following 7 July, he moved to SD Eibar in the same league also in a temporary deal. Used almost equally as a starter and substitute, he scored five goals – including two in a 3–1 victory at Málaga CF on 23 April 2022 while playing 14 minutes– as the Basques made the play-off semi-finals.

On 6 July 2022, Sol was loaned for a third time to a side in his country's second division, this time Málaga. More often than not a substitute, he contributed just three goals (plus one in the cup) and his team suffered relegation.

=== AEK Larnaca ===
In July 2023, Sol moved to the third foreign country of his career, signing for AEK Larnaca FC of compatriot José Luis Oltra. In just his second game in the Cypriot First Division on 28 August, he scored four goals in a 5–5 home draw with Ethnikos Achna FC.

== Personal life ==
Sol learned four foreign languages: French, Dutch, English and Russian. A fan of science fiction literature, he wrote his own novel in 2020 titled Madrid 2035, in which the protagonist is a former tennis player.

== Career statistics ==
As of match played 30 May 2025

Appearances and goals by club, season and competition
| Club | Season | League | | | National cup (Note: Includes Copa del Rey, KNVB Cup, Ukrainian Cup, Cypriot Cup) | | Europe | | Other | | Total | |
| Club | Season | Division | Apps | Goals | Apps | Goals | Apps | Goals | Apps | Goals | Apps | Goals |
|---|---|---|---|---|---|---|---|---|---|---|---|---|
| Real Madrid C | 2009–10 | Tercera División | 4 | 7 | — | | — | | — | | 4 | 7 |
| Real Madrid C | 2010–11 | Tercera División | 9 | 7 | — | | — | | — | | 9 | 7 |
| Real Madrid C | 2011–12 | Tercera División | 18 | 12 | — | | — | | — | | 18 | 12 |
| Real Madrid C | 2013–14 | Segunda División B | 31 | 7 | — | | — | | — | | 31 | 7 |
| Real Madrid C | Total | | 62 | 33 | — | | — | | — | | 62 | 33 |
| Lugo (loan) | 2012–13 | Segunda División | 12 | 1 | 1 | 0 | — | | — | | 13 | 1 |
| Oviedo (loan) | 2012–13 | Segunda División B | 10 | 0 | — | | — | | 1 (Note: Appearances in Segunda División B play-offs) | 0 | 11 | 0 |
| Villarreal B | 2014–15 | Segunda División B | 36 | 11 | — | | — | | — | | 36 | 11 |
| Villarreal B | 2015–16 | Segunda División B | 35 | 16 | — | | — | | 2 | 0 | 37 | 16 |
| Villarreal B | Total | | 71 | 27 | — | | — | | 2 | 0 | 73 | 27 |
| Villarreal | 2014–15 | La Liga | 2 | 0 | — | | — | | — | | 2 | 0 |
| Willem II | 2016–17 | Eredivisie | 30 | 10 | 1 | 0 | — | | — | | 31 | 10 |
| Willem II | 2017–18 | Eredivisie | 32 | 16 | 5 | 4 | — | | — | | 37 | 20 |
| Willem II | 2018–19 | Eredivisie | 17 | 13 | 3 | 4 | — | | — | | 20 | 17 |
| Willem II | Total | | 79 | 39 | 9 | 8 | — | | — | | 88 | 47 |
| Dynamo Kyiv | 2018–19 | Ukrainian Premier League | 2 | 1 | — | | 2 (Note: Appearances in UEFA Europa League) | 1 | — | | 4 | 2 |
| Dynamo Kyiv | 2019–20 | Ukrainian Premier League | 13 | 1 | 2 | 0 | 2 (Note: One appearance in UEFA Champions League, one appearance in UEFA Europa League) | 0 | — | | 17 | 1 |
| Dynamo Kyiv | 2020–21 | Ukrainian Premier League | 2 | 0 | — | | — | | 1 (Note: Appearance in Ukrainian Super Cup) | 1 | 3 | 1 |
| Dynamo Kyiv | Total | | 17 | 2 | 2 | 0 | 4 | 1 | 1 | 1 | 24 | 4 |
| Tenerife | 2020–21 | Segunda División | 38 | 10 | 2 | 0 | — | | — | | 40 | 10 |
| Eibar | 2021–22 | Segunda División | 29 | 5 | 3 | 0 | — | | 2 (Note: Appearances in Segunda División B play-offs) | 0 | 34 | 5 |
| Málaga | 2022–23 | Segunda División | 32 | 3 | 2 | 1 | — | | — | | 34 | 4 |
| AEK Larnaca | 2023–24 | Cypriot First Division | 34 | 15 | 2 | 0 | 4 (Note: Appearances in UEFA Europa Conference League) | 0 | — | | 40 | 15 |
| AEK Larnaca | 2024–25 | Cypriot First Division | 29 | 5 | 4 | 1 | 2 (Note: Appearances in UEFA Europa Conference League) | 0 | — | | 35 | 6 |
| AEK Larnaca | Total | | 63 | 20 | 6 | 1 | 6 | 0 | — | | 75 | 21 |
| Career total | | | 415 | 140 | 25 | 10 | 10 | 1 | 6 | 1 | 456 | 152 |

== Honours ==
Dynamo Kyiv

- Ukrainian Premier League: 2020–21
- Ukrainian Cup: 2019–20
- Ukrainian Super Cup: 2020

AEK Larnaca

- Cypriot Cup: 2024–25
