= Félix Alonso =

Spanish footballer

Personal information
- Full name: Félix Rafael Alonso Expósito
- Date of birth: 29 December 2000 (age 25)
- Place of birth: Santa Cruz de Tenerife, Spain
- Height: 1.85 m (6 ft 1 in)
- Position: Midfielder

Youth career
- Tenerife
- Llamoro
- 2018–2019: Sobradillo

Senior career*
Years	Team	Apps	(Gls)
2019–2020	Santa Úrsula	26	(1)
2020–2025	Tenerife B	90	(3)
2020–2022	Tenerife	1	(0)
2022–2023	→ Atlético Paso (loan)	3	(0)
2023	→ Tarazona (loan)	8	(0)
- * Club domestic league appearances and goals as of 4 May 2025

Félix Rafael Alonso Expósito (born 29 December 2000) is a Spanish footballer who plays as a central midfielder.

== Club career ==
Born in Santa Cruz de Tenerife, Canary Islands, Alonso represented CD Tenerife, CD Llamoro and CD Sobradillo as a youth. In 2019, after finishing his formation, he joined Tercera División side CD Santa Úrsula.

Alonso made his senior debut on 25 August 2019, coming on as a second-half substitute in a 1–1 away draw against UD Lanzarote. He scored his first senior goal on 28 September, netting his team's third in a 3–1 home win against UD Las Palmas C.

On 23 June 2020, Alonso returned to Tenerife and was assigned to the B-team also in the fourth division. He made his first team debut on 29 May of the following year, replacing fellow youth graduate Javi Alonso in a 2–2 home draw against Real Oviedo in the Segunda División championship.
