= Rodrigo Rivas =

Colombian footballer (born 1997)

Personal information
- Full name: Rodrigo Rivas Gonzalez
- Date of birth: 11 April 1997 (age 29)
- Place of birth: Bajo Baudó, Colombia
- Height: 1.86 m (6 ft 1 in)
- Position: Forward

Team information
- Current team: Boluspor
- Number: 9

Senior career*
| Years | Team | Apps | (Gls) |
| 2016–2017 | Doxa Katokopias | 2 | (0) |
| 2017 | Anagennisi Deryneia | 8 | (1) |
| 2017–2018 | NK Rudeš | 2 | (0) |
| 2018–2020 | Alavés B | 13 | (1) |
| 2018 | → Amurrio (loan) | 15 | (7) |
| 2018–2019 | → San Ignacio (loan) | 33 | (14) |
| 2020 | El Ejido | 7 | (0) |
| 2021 | Marino | 15 | (5) |
| 2021 | Técnico Universitario | 10 | (4) |
| 2022 | Universidad Católica | 26 | (3) |
| 2023 | Orense | 23 | (3) |
| 2024 | América de Cali | 1 | (0) |
| 2024–2025 | Academia Puerto Cabello | 13 | (4) |
| 2025 | Quy Nhơn Bình Định | 14 | (3) |
| 2025–2026 | Patriotas | 9 | (2) |
| 2026 | Independiente Petrolero | 8 | (2) |
| 2026– | Boluspor | 11 | (1) |
- * Club domestic league appearances and goals as of 18 October 2026

Rodrigo Rivas Gonzalez (born 11 April 1997) is a Colombian footballer who plays as a forward for Turkish TFF 1. Lig club Boluspor.

== Career statistics ==
=== Club ===
As of 22 December 2018.

| Club | Season | League | | | Cup | | Continental | | Other | | Total | |
| Club | Season | Division | Apps | Goals | Apps | Goals | Apps | Goals | Apps | Goals | Apps | Goals |
|---|---|---|---|---|---|---|---|---|---|---|---|---|
| Doxa Katokopias | 2016–17 | Cypriot First Division | 2 | 0 | 0 | 0 | – | | 0 | 0 | 2 | 0 |
| Anagennisi Deryneia | 2016–17 | Cypriot First Division | 8 | 1 | 2 (Note: Appearances in the Cypriot Cup) | 0 | – | | 0 | 0 | 10 | 1 |
| NK Rudeš | 2017–18 | Prva HNL | 2 | 0 | 0 | 0 | – | | 0 | 0 | 2 | 0 |
| San Ignacio | 2018–19 | Tercera División | 15 | 5 | 0 | 0 | – | | 0 | 0 | 15 | 5 |
| Career total | | | 27 | 6 | 2 | 0 | 0 | 0 | 0 | 0 | 29 | 6 |
