= CD Marino =

Spanish football club

Marino
- Full name: Club Deportivo Marino
- Founded: 1933; 93 years ago
- Ground: Antonio Domínguez Alfonso, Playa de las Américas, Arona, Canary Islands, Spain
- Capacity: 7,500
- President: (Spain) Paco Santamaria
- Head coach: (Spain) Kiko de Diego
- League: Tercera Federación – Group 12
- 2025–26: Tercera Federación – Group 12, 12th of 18
Home colours	Away colours

Club Deportivo Marino Playa de Las Américas, known simply as CD Marino, is a semi-professional Spanish football club based in Playa de Las Américas, Tenerife, in the autonomous community of the Canary Islands.

Founded in 1933, the club hails from the Tenerife tourist hotspot of Los Cristianos, moving to its 7,500 capacity Estadio Antonio Domínguez Alfonso in Playa de Las Américas in 1969. It currently plays in the Tercera Federación – Group 12.

== History ==
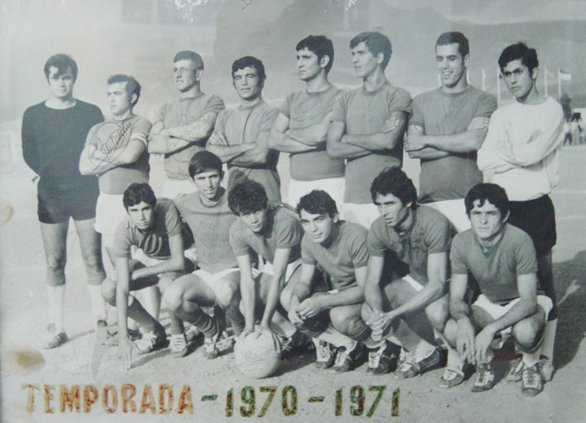
CD Marino squad photo in the 1970–71 season.

=== Formation years ===
Formed in 1933, by fishermen in the then small community of Los Cristianos, Arona, as Marino Fútbol Club, Club Deportivo Marino is the oldest football club in the south of Tenerife. The club came to be known as Club Deportivo Marino upon its registration with the local authority on 13 June 1947, with Segundo Fumero being named as the club's first president. At the time of its official formation, the club played its games on the El Guincho salt flats, which were located near one of Tenerife's now most-popular beaches, Las Vistas. In 1948, the club moved its games to Campo de El Quinto.

=== 1975 & Onwards: Becoming members of the Spanish football pyramid ===
In 1975, the Spanish football league system was expanded, which saw the formation of the Canary Islands Group of the Third Division, which held the title of being the third tier of Spanish football until the formation of the Second Division B in 1977, and the formation of the top tier Preferential Inter-Island leagues of Las Palmas and Tenerife, which, at the time were the fourth tiers of the Spanish football pyramid until 1977, when they became the fifth tier. CD Marino became founding members of the Tenerife inter-island league, joining the league upon its formation in 1975.

At the end of the 1979–80 season, CD Marino were promoted to the Third Division Canary Islands Group after finishing 2nd. CD Marino would spend eight seasons in the fourth tier of Spanish football before Valentin Toste guided the club to promotion to Second Division B at the end of the 1987–88 season, with Marino being crowned as champions. The club enjoyed a good start to life in the third tier, achieving its best-ever finish of 10th in its first season. However, in its fifth and final season in the third tier, CD Marino began to experience significant financial difficulties, which saw the club suffer a slump both on and off the pitch. Its financial difficulties contributed massively to the club's subsequent departure from the Second Division B, with it dropping down two leagues to the Tenerife Preferential Inter-Island league. It wouldn't, though, be the clubs only relegation - instead suffering back-to-back relegations at the end of the 1993–94 season to the Tenerife First Inter-Island league, the sixth tier of Spanish football.

=== Post-2000s: Making its way up the Spanish football pyramid once again ===
After beginning a period of stabilisation in the sixth tier, it was the club's fourth season, the 97–98 season, that it achieved promotion back to the top tier of regional football after finishing as champions in first place. In its first season back in the Tenerife Preferential Inter-Island league, the club achieved a respectable fourth-place finish.

In the 2006–07 season, CD Marino's eighth season in the fifth tier, the club managed a second-place finish, defeating Unión Deportiva Balos of the Las Palmas Preferential Inter-Island league to win promotion back to the Third Division Canary Islands Group just under twenty years since it last played in the league. Finishing in the 16th place in its first season, the club began pushing up the league over the course of the next few seasons, before ultimately finishing first in the 2011–12 season, which pitted the club in a promotion play-off against CF Fuenlabrada. Over the course of two-legs, CD Marino won 4–2 on aggregate.

CD Marino began the 2012–13 season with a Tenerife island derby against CD Tenerife on 26 August, a game which they went on to lose 2–0. It was the first time that CD Tenerife, the island's most successful football club, had faced another Tenerife-based side in a league fixture. The opening day defeat would be a sign of things to come from the club, which ultimately suffered relegation at the end-of-the-season after finishing at the bottom of the table.

Upon its return to the fourth tier of Spanish football, CD Marino enjoyed two top three finishes before finishing three out of four more seasons in the league in the bottom half of the table. In a season that was disrupted by the COVID-19 pandemic, CD Marino found themselves as leaders of their group at the end of the 2019–20 season, seeing them drawn against UD Tamaraceite in the semi-finals of the Third Division promotion play-offs. With COVID dictating that only one leg would be played as opposed to the usual two, CD Marino found themselves falling at the first hurdle after being defeated 1–0 by their fellow promotion chasing side. However, in a turn of fate, the club would ultimately go on to secure promotion in the end anyway, after the Royal Spanish Football Federation decided that the club, alongside CD Lealtad, CD Alcoyano and Linares Deportivo would be promoted to the Second Division B as a means to make up the division's numbers.

In its return to the third tier of Spanish football, CD Marino were to suffer the same fate of their last three seasons in the league, finishing last in both the first and second phases of the competition, ultimately being relegated to the newly-formed Tercera División RFEF, the fifth tier of Spanish football after a shake-up of the pyramid by the RFEF in 2021. At the end of the 2021-22 season, the club's first in the newly-formed league, CD Marino came to finish in tenth place.

== Rivalries ==
Located in the municipality of Arona, CD Marino is one of many football clubs from the area, which has seen it enjoy many local rivalries as a result since its inception. One of which being its rivalry with UD Ibarra, who are based in the town of Las Galletas. Alongside its rivalry with UD Ibarra, it's also maintained rivalries with other Arona-based teams such as CD I'Gara, CD Buzanada, CD San Lorenzo and the now-defunct Atlético Arona, who have since reformed as CD Furia Arona.

== Stadium ==
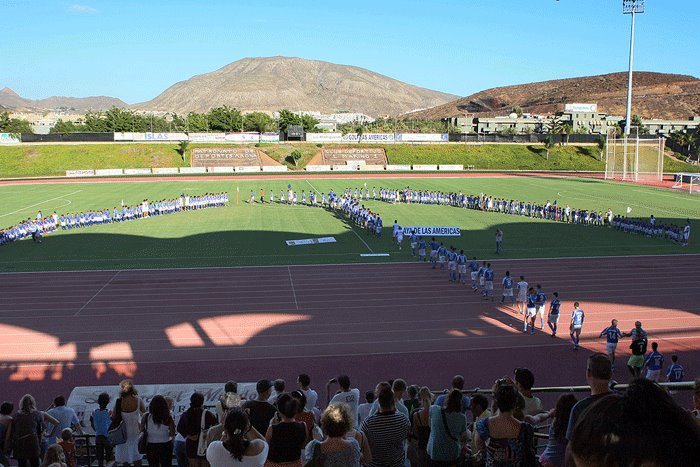
CD Marino 2011–12 club presentation held at the Estadio Antonio Domínguez Alfonso, the club's ground.

Prior to the construction of the Estadio Antonio Domínguez Alfonso, known in English as the Antonio Domínguez Alfonso Stadium or by its full name of Antonio Domínguez Alfonso Municipal Olympic Stadium, CD Marino played their games on the salt flats of El Guincho for a year before moving to the Campo de El Quinto in 1948. On 7 September 1969, the stadium opened, being named after Arona-born Spanish politician Antonio Domínguez Alfonso, whose family provided CD Marino the land to build the stadium on.

Owned by Arona Council, and the club itself, the stadium has a capacity of 7,500 for sporting events, whilst being able to accommodate a capacity of 27,000 for concerts. Aside from hosting football, the stadium also plays host to athletics events and the Arona Summer Festival. Prior to the installation of artificial grass in 2001, the stadium had a dirt pitch.

The stadium is joined by the El Anexo Estadio Antonio Domínguez (English: Antonio Domínguez Stadium or the Antonio Domínguez Annex), which was completed in November 1998 and has a seating capacity of 300. The annex hosts CD Marino's lower level sides, such as its reserve teams and its juniors.

== Honours ==
- Teide Trophy (2): 1988, 2012

== Season to season ==
Season	Tier	Division	Place	Copa del Rey
1948–49	6	3ª Reg.	3rd	
1949–50	6	3ª Reg.	1st	
1950–51	6	3ª Reg.		
1951–52	6	3ª Reg.		
1952–53	6	3ª Reg.		
1953–54	6	3ª Reg.		
1954–55	6	3ª Reg.		
1955–56	6	3ª Reg.		
1956–57	6	3ª Reg.		
1957–58	6	3ª Reg.		
1958–59	6	3ª Reg.		
1959–60	6	3ª Reg.		
1960–1966	DNP			
1966–67	5	2ª Reg.	4th	
1967–68	5	2ª Reg.		
1968–69	5	2ª Reg.	10th	
1969–70	5	2ª Reg.	6th	
1970–71	5	2ª Reg.	4th	
1971–72	5	2ª Reg.		
1972–73	4	1ª Reg.	11th	

Season	Tier	Division	Place	Copa del Rey
1973–74	5	2ª Reg.		
1974–75	5	2ª Reg.		
1975–76	4	Reg. Pref.	4th	
1976–77	4	Reg. Pref.	10th	
1977–78	5	Reg. Pref.	6th	
1978–79	5	Reg. Pref.	7th	
1979–80	5	Reg. Pref.	2nd	
1980–81	4	3ª	11th	
1981–82	4	3ª	7th	
1982–83	4	3ª	14th	
1983–84	4	3ª	14th	
1984–85	4	3ª	11th	
1985–86	4	3ª	9th	
1986–87	4	3ª	16th	
1987–88	4	3ª	1st	
1988–89	3	2ª B	10th	
1989–90	3	2ª B	10th	
1990–91	3	2ª B	12th	
1991–92	3	2ª B	12th	
1992–93	3	2ª B	19th	First round

Season	Tier	Division	Place	Copa del Rey
1993–94	5	Int. Pref.	17th	
1994–95	6	1ª Int.	2nd	
1995–96	6	1ª Int.	6th	
1996–97	6	1ª Int.	4th	
1997–98	6	1ª Int.	1st	
1998–99	5	Int. Pref.	4th	
1999–2000	5	Int. Pref.	9th	
2000–01	5	Int. Pref.	7th	
2001–02	5	Int. Pref.	10th	
2002–03	5	Int. Pref.	10th	
2003–04	5	Int. Pref.	12th	
2004–05	5	Int. Pref.	12th	
2005–06	5	Int. Pref.	4th	
2006–07	5	Int. Pref.	2nd	
2007–08	4	3ª	16th	
2008–09	4	3ª	9th	
2009–10	4	3ª	4th	
2010–11	4	3ª	6th	
2011–12	4	3ª	1st	
2012–13	3	2ª B	20th	First round

Season	Tier	Division	Place	Copa del Rey
2013–14	4	3ª	2nd	
2014–15	4	3ª	3rd	
2015–16	4	3ª	17th	
2016–17	4	3ª	6th	
2017–18	4	3ª	13th	
2018–19	4	3ª	12th	
2019–20	4	3ª	1st	
2020–21	3	2ª B	10th / 8th	First round
2021–22	5	3ª RFEF	10th	
2022–23	5	3ª Fed.	11th	
2023–24	5	3ª Fed.	11th	
2024–25	5	3ª Fed.	8th	
2025–26	5	3ª Fed.	12th	
2026–27	5	3ª Fed.		

- 6 seasons in Segunda División B
- 20 seasons in Tercera División
- 6 seasons in Tercera Federación/Tercera División RFEF

== Current squad ==
As of 7 April 2021

Note: Flags indicate national team as defined under FIFA eligibility rules; some limited exceptions apply. Players may hold more than one non-FIFA nationality.

No.	Pos.	Nation	Player
1	GK	RUS	David Kikvidze
2	DF	RUS	Nikita Merkulov
4	DF	ESP	Álvaro Arencibia
5	DF	ESP	Javi Saavedra (captain)
6	DF	ESP	Samuel Arbelo
7	FW	ESP	Nami Sánchez
8	MF	BEL	Julien Vercauteren
9	FW	ESP	Manu Dimas
10	FW	SEN	Ahmed
11	MF	ESP	Nadjib Mengoud
12	FW	COL	Rodrigo Rivas

No.	Pos.	Nation	Player
13	GK	ESP	Ángel Galván
14	MF	MLI	Mamoutou N'Diaye
16	DF	GHA	Joshua Kweku
17	DF	URU	Fede Olivera (on loan from Tenerife B)
18	FW	USA	Faris Abdelhaq
19	MF	BEL	Charni Ekangamene
20	MF	ESP	Jurgen Méndez
21	FW	ESP	Borja Llarena (on loan from Tenerife B)
22	DF	ESP	Pedro Alemán
29	FW	SEN	Moussa Gueye
