= Leo Mascaró =

Belarusian footballer (born 2003)

Personal information
- Full name: Leonardo Mascaró Kapilevich
- Date of birth: 2 August 2003 (age 23)
- Place of birth: Palma, Spain
- Height: 1.90 m (6 ft 3 in)
- Position: Centre-back

Team information
- Current team: União de Leiria
- Number: 4

Youth career
- 2014–2022: Mallorca

Senior career*
Years	Team	Apps	(Gls)
2022	Mallorca B	5	(1)
2022–2023	Sevilla C	11	(1)
2022–2025	Sevilla B	30	(0)
2025–2026	Recreativo	16	(1)
2026–	União de Leiria	0	(0)

International career^{‡}
2021	Belarus U19	2	(0)
2025–	Belarus	1	(0)
- * Club domestic league appearances and goals as of 13 September 2026 ‡ National team caps and goals as of 9 October 2025

Leonardo Mascaró Kapilevich (Russian: Лео Маскаро Капилевич; born 2 August 2003) is a footballer who plays as a centre-back for Liga Portugal 2 club União de Leiria. Born in Spain, he represents the Belarus national team.

== Club career ==
Mascaró joined the youth academy of Spanish side RCD Mallorca at the age of eleven. In 2022, he joined Sevilla FC and played for their C and B-teams.

On 27 June 2025, Mascaró was announced at Segunda Federación side Recreativo de Huelva.

== International career ==
In 2023, Mascaró was called up to the Belarus national football team.

== Style of play ==
Mascaró mainly operates as a defender and is known for his free-kick taking ability.

== Personal life ==
Mascaró was born in Palma, Spain, to a Spanish father and Belarusian mother.
