= Alassan Manjam =

Bissau-Guinean footballer

Personal information
- Full name: Alassan Manjam Gutiérrez
- Date of birth: 12 September 2002 (age 24)
- Place of birth: Tenerife, Spain
- Height: 1.77 m (5 ft 10 in)
- Position: Winger

Team information
- Current team: Tenerife
- Number: 20

Youth career
- Sobradillo

Senior career*
Years	Team	Apps	(Gls)
2021–2022	Tenerife C	14	(7)
2021–2025	Tenerife B	54	(17)
2022–	Tenerife	42	(2)
2024	→ Melilla (loan)	15	(1)

International career^{‡}
2026–	Guinea-Bissau	1	(0)
- * Club domestic league appearances and goals as of 4 April 2026 ‡ National team caps and goals as of 15:21, 24 April 2026 (UTC)

Alassan Manjam Gutiérrez (born 12 September 2002), sometimes simply known as Alassan, is a footballer who plays as a left winger for CD Tenerife. Born in Spain, he plays for the Guinea-Bissau national team.

== Club career ==
Alassán joined CD Tenerife in 2021, from CD Sobradillo. Initially assigned to the C-team in the Preferente Interinsular, he also featured for the reserves in Tercera División RFEF during the campaign.

Alassán made his first team debut on 28 October 2022, coming on as a second-half substitute for Teto in a 2–0 Segunda División home loss against Real Zaragoza.

On 23 January 2024, Alassan was loaned to Primera Federación side UD Melilla for the remainder of the season.

== International career ==
Alassan was born in Spain to a Bissau-Guinean father and Spanish mother. He was called up to the Guinea-Bissau national team for a set of friendlies in March 2026.
