= Jesús Belza =

Spanish footballer

Personal information
- Full name: Jesús Belza Medina
- Date of birth: 26 February 2004 (age 22)
- Place of birth: Las Palmas, Spain
- Height: 1.68 m (5 ft 6 in)
- Positions: Right back; winger

Team information
- Current team: Tenerife B
- Number: 2

Youth career
- Puertos Las Palmas
- Unión Puerto
- 2020–2023: Tenerife

Senior career*
Years	Team	Apps	(Gls)
2022	Tenerife C	1	(0)
2022–	Tenerife B	43	(1)
2023–	Tenerife	10	(0)
2024–2025	→ Antequera (loan)	7	(0)
- * Club domestic league appearances and goals as of 16 May 2026

Jesús Belza Medina (born 26 February 2004) is a Spanish footballer who plays as either a right back or a right winger for Tenerife B in Segunda Federación.

== Career ==
Born in Tafira Alta, Las Palmas, Canary Islands, Belza joined CD Tenerife's youth setup from CD Unión Puerto in 2020. He made his senior debut with the reserves on 2 November 2022, starting in a 0–0 Tercera Federación home draw against UD Lanzarote.

Belza scored his first senior goal on 6 November 2022, netting a last-minute equalizer in a 2–2 home draw against UD Ibarra. In July of the following year, he was called up to the pre-season with the first team.

Belza made his professional debut on 25 September 2023, coming on as a late substitute for Roberto López in a 1–0 Segunda División home win over RCD Espanyol.

On 22 August 2024, Belza joined Primera Federación – Group 2 club Antequera on a season-long loan deal.
