= David Rodríguez (footballer, born 2000) =

Spanish footballer

Personal information
- Full name: David Rodríguez Ramos
- Date of birth: 26 June 2000 (age 26)
- Place of birth: Santa Cruz de Tenerife, Spain
- Height: 1.75 m (5 ft 9 in)
- Position: Right back

Team information
- Current team: Tenerife
- Number: 2

Youth career
- 2010–2019: Tenerife

Senior career*
| Years | Team | Apps | (Gls) |
| 2019–2020 | Tenerife C | 6 | (1) |
| 2019–2023 | Tenerife B | 61 | (7) |
| 2021– | Tenerife | 74 | (1) |
| 2023–2024 | → Antequera (loan) | 35 | (1) |
- * Club domestic league appearances and goals as of 23 May 2026

David Rodríguez Ramos (born 26 June 2000) is a Spanish footballer who plays for CD Tenerife. Mainly a right back, he can also play as a central defender or a defensive midfielder.

== Club career ==
Born in Santa Cruz de Tenerife, Canary Islands, Rodríguez was a CD Tenerife youth graduate, and made his senior debut with the C-team in the 2019–20 season, in the regional leagues. He first appeared with the reserves on 20 October 2019, starting in a 1–0 Tercera División home win over UD Villa de Santa Brígida.

Rodríguez made his first team debut on 10 October 2021, coming on as a first-half substitute for Álex Bermejo in a 2–1 home defeat of SD Amorebieta in the Segunda División championship. On 16 March 2023, he renewed his contract with the club until 2026.

On 14 July 2023, Rodríguez was loaned to Primera Federación side Antequera CF for the season. He was a regular starter during his spell, and was definitely promoted to the first team of Tete on 21 June 2024.
