= Jacobo González =

Spanish footballer (born 1997)

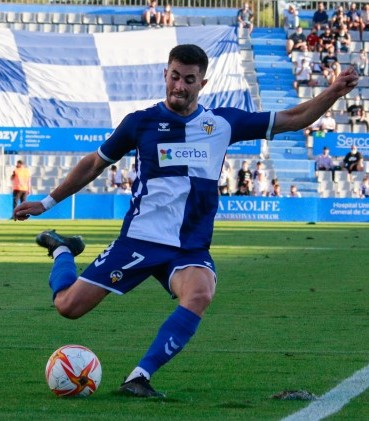
- Jacobo playing for Sabadell in 2021

Personal information
- Full name: Jacobo González Rodrigáñez
- Date of birth: 25 March 1997 (age 29)
- Place of birth: Madrid, Spain
- Height: 1.79 m (5 ft 10 in)
- Position: Winger

Team information
- Current team: Oviedo

Youth career
- 2005–2008: Las Rozas
- 2008–2009: Boadilla
- 2009–2016: Real Madrid

Senior career*
Years	Team	Apps	(Gls)
2016–2017	Alcorcón B	10	(1)
2016–2017	Alcorcón	2	(0)
2017	→ Rayo Majadahonda (loan)	12	(0)
2017–2018	Villanovense	30	(3)
2018–2020	Celta B	43	(8)
2020	Celta	2	(0)
2020–2021	Tenerife	14	(1)
2021–2022	Sabadell	35	(13)
2022–2023	Andorra	30	(2)
2023–2024	Alcorcón	36	(5)
2024–2026	Córdoba	74	(18)
2026–	Oviedo	0	(0)
- * Club domestic league appearances and goals as of 31 May 2026

Jacobo González Rodrigáñez (born 25 March 1997), sometimes known simply as Jacobo, is a professional Spanish footballer who plays for Real Oviedo. Mainly a right winger, he can also play as a right-back.

== Career ==
Born in Madrid, Jacobo joined Real Madrid's youth setup in 2009, aged 12. On 9 July 2016, he moved to neighbouring Alcorcón, being assigned to the reserves in the Tercera División.

On 20 August 2016 Jacobo made his professional debut, starting in a 0–0 home draw against Huesca in the Segunda División. On 30 December, he was loaned to Segunda División B side Rayo Majadahonda until the end of the season.

On 14 August 2017, Jacobo signed for Villanovense in the third division. The following 13 June, he agreed to a two-year contract with fellow league team Celta B.

Jacobo made his first team – and La Liga – debut for the Galicians on 27 June 2020, starting in a 2–2 home draw against Barcelona. On 7 August, he agreed to a three-year contract with Tenerife in the second division.

Jacobo scored his first professional goal on 13 September 2020, netting his team's second in a 2–0 home win over Málaga. On 26 July 2021, after featuring sparingly, he moved to Sabadell of the Primera División RFEF.

On 21 July 2022, after scoring a career-best 13 goals, Jacobo signed a contract with Andorra, newly-promoted to the second level. On 27 July of the following year, he returned to his first club Alcorcón on a two-year deal.

On 16 July 2024, after suffering relegation with Alkor, Jacobo agreed to a two-year contract with Córdoba, also in division two. On 3 June 2026, he moved to fellow league team Real Oviedo also on a two-year deal.
