= Youssouf Diarra =

Malian born football player

Yussi Diarra
Personal information
- Full name: Youssouf Diarra
- Date of birth: 13 September 1998 (age 28)
- Place of birth: Bamako, Mali
- Height: 1.74 m (5 ft 9 in)
- Position: Midfielder

Team information
- Current team: Córdoba (on loan from Cádiz)

Youth career
- Cervera
- 2009–2014: Tàrrega
- 2014–2015: Lleida Esportiu
- 2015–2016: Ardoi

Senior career*
Years	Team	Apps	(Gls)
2016–2017	Txantrea	33	(15)
2017–2020	Basconia	74	(21)
2020–2022	Bilbao Athletic	61	(2)
2022–2024	Córdoba	74	(9)
2024–2025	Tenerife	42	(5)
2025–	Cádiz	28	(1)
2026–	→ Córdoba (loan)	0	(0)
- * Club domestic league appearances and goals as of 9 June 2026

Youssouf "Yussi" Diarra (born 13 September 1998) is a Malian footballer who plays as a midfielder for Spanish club Córdoba CF, on loan from Cádiz CF.

== Early life ==
Diarra was born in Bamako, and moved to Cervera, Lleida, Catalonia at the age of eight. He began his career with CEF Cervera, and later represented UE Tàrrega and Lleida Esportiu before moving to Pamplona, Navarre in 2015, when he joined CF Ardoi FE.

== Club career ==
In 2016, Diarra joined Tercera División side UDC Txantrea, where he became a spotlight and scored 15 goals during the campaign. His performances attracted the interest of Athletic Bilbao and Villarreal CF, and he joined the former in June, which raised doubts over the club's signing policy.

After playing for the farm team CD Basconia, Diarra was promoted to the reserves in Segunda División B ahead of the 2020–21 season. On 26 May 2021, he renewed his contract until 2023.

On 13 July 2022, Diarra signed a two-year deal with Córdoba CF in Primera Federación, with Athletic holding a buy-back clause. He was a first-choice for the club during the 2023–24 campaign, scoring five goals in 41 appearances overall as they achieved promotion to Segunda División; on 1 July 2024, he departed the club after rejecting a contract renewal.

On 5 July 2024, Diarra agreed to a three-year contract with CD Tenerife in the second division. He made his professional debut on 19 August, replacing Álex Corredera in a 2–1 away loss to CD Eldense.

Diarra scored his first professional goal on 31 August 2024, netting the opener in a 2–2 draw at Cádiz CF. On 30 July of the following year, he moved to the latter club on a four-year deal.

On 10 July 2026, Diarra returned to Córdoba, with the club now also in division two, on a one-year loan deal.
