= Jeremy Socorro =

Spanish footballer

Personal information
- Full name: Jeremy Socorro Pulido
- Date of birth: 1 September 1999 (age 27)
- Place of birth: Las Palmas, Spain
- Height: 1.75 m (5 ft 9 in)
- Position: Left back

Team information
- Current team: UCAM Murcia
- Number: 3

Youth career
- Las Palmas

Senior career*
Years	Team	Apps	(Gls)
2018–2022	Tenerife B	78	(2)
2022–2024	Tenerife	1	(0)
2022–2024	→ Antequera (loan)	41	(2)
2024–	UCAM Murcia	32	(0)
- * Club domestic league appearances and goals as of 15 May 2026

Jeremy Socorro Pulido (born 1 September 1999) is a Spanish footballer who plays as a left back for UCAM Murcia CF.

== Club career ==
Born in Las Palmas, Canary Islands, Socorro was an UD Las Palmas youth graduate. On 3 August 2018, after finishing his formation, he moved to rivals CD Tenerife; initially assigned to the C-team, he featured regularly with the reserves in Tercera División during the season.

Socorro made his first team debut on 29 May 2022, starting in a 2–1 Segunda División home loss against FC Cartagena. On 24 June, he renewed his contract with Tenerife until 2024, but was loaned to Segunda Federación side Antequera CF on 1 September.

In July 2023, after achieving promotion to Primera Federación, Socorro's loan with Antequera was extended for a further year. On 9 July 2024, he signed for UCAM Murcia CF in the fourth division.
