= Adilson (footballer, born 1997) =

Portuguese footballer (born 1997)

Personal information
- Full name: Adilson Mendes Martins
- Date of birth: 21 March 1997 (age 29)
- Place of birth: Lisbon, Portugal
- Height: 1.69 m (5 ft 7 in)
- Position: Winger

Team information
- Current team: Córdoba
- Number: 17

Youth career
- Cavigal
- 2015–2016: Monaco
- 2016–2017: Gent
- 2017–2019: Royal Antwerp

Senior career*
Years	Team	Apps	(Gls)
2019–2023	Badajoz	91	(8)
2023–	Córdoba	67	(14)
- * Club domestic league appearances and goals as of 6 June 2026

Adilson Mendes Martins (born 21 March 1997), known simply as Adilson, is a Portuguese professional footballer who plays as a winger for Spanish club Córdoba CF.

== Career ==
Born in Lisbon to Cape Verdean parents, Adilson moved to Nice at early age and began his career with local side Cavigal Football. In 2015, he joined AS Monaco FC's youth categories, but moved to the under-21 squad of Belgian side KAA Gent in the following year.

In 2017, Adilson signed for Royal Antwerp FC, also playing for their under-21 team. On 21 June 2019, he moved to Spanish Segunda División B side CD Badajoz, after previously spending a period on trial at the club.

Adilson made his senior debut on 25 August 2019, starting in a 0–0 away draw against FC Cartagena. On 8 July 2021, he renewed his contract until 2023, and scored his first goal the following 6 February, netting the opener in a 1–1 home draw against Celta de Vigo B.

On 3 April 2023, Adilson further extended his link with the Blanquinegros until 2025. On 1 July, after suffering relegation from Primera Federación, he joined Córdoba CF also in the third division.

Adilson was a regular starter during the campaign, scoring a career-best nine goals in 39 appearances overall as the Blanquiverdes achieved promotion to Segunda División. He made his professional debut on 16 August 2024, starting in a 1–0 away loss to CD Mirandés.

Adilson scored his first professional goal on 23 September 2024, netting his side's only in a 4–1 away loss to SD Huesca.
