= Juan Soriano (footballer) =

Spanish footballer (born 1997)

Personal information
- Full name: Juan Soriano Oropesa
- Date of birth: 23 August 1997 (age 29)
- Place of birth: Benacazón, Spain
- Height: 1.85 m (6 ft 1 in)
- Position: Goalkeeper

Team information
- Current team: Académico Viseu
- Number: 12

Youth career
- Betis
- 2009–2016: Sevilla

Senior career*
Years	Team	Apps	(Gls)
2016–2018	Sevilla B	32	(0)
2018–2021	Sevilla	4	(0)
2019–2020	→ Leganés (loan)	11	(0)
2020–2021	→ Málaga (loan)	18	(0)
2021–2024	Tenerife	123	(0)
2024–2026	Leganés	48	(0)
2026−	Académico Viseu	0	(0)

International career
2014	Spain U17	4	(0)
2015	Spain U18	1	(0)
2015–2016	Spain U19	4	(0)
2018	Spain U21	1	(0)
- * Club domestic league appearances and goals as of 9 June 2026

Juan Soriano Oropesa (born 23 August 1997) is a Spanish professional footballer who plays as a goalkeeper for Primeira Liga club Académico de Viseu.

== Club career ==
=== Sevilla ===
Born in Benacazón, Province of Seville, Andalusia, Soriano joined Sevilla FC's youth setup in 2009 at the age of 12, from Real Betis. He was called up by first-team manager Unai Emery during the 2014–15 season, and was an unused substitute in a 2–0 home win against Feyenoord in the group stage of the UEFA Europa League.

Soriano renewed his contract on 13 May 2016, until 2019. He made his professional debut on 21 August, starting in the 3–3 Segunda División home draw with Girona FC.

On 5 July 2018, Soriano agreed to an extension until 2022 and was promoted to the main squad in La Liga. Benefitting from injury to starter Tomáš Vaclík, he played his first match in the competition on 10 March 2019 in a 5–2 home rout of Real Sociedad.

On 5 July 2019, Soriano was loaned to fellow top-tier side CD Leganés for one year. On 28 September of the following year, he moved to Málaga CF in the second division, also in a temporary deal.

=== Tenerife ===
Soriano joined CD Tenerife as a free agent on 17 June 2021, on a three-year deal. An undisputed starter during his spell at the club, he left in June 2024 after his link expired.

=== Leganés return ===
On 2 July 2024, Soriano returned to Leganés after agreeing to a three-year contract, with the team now in the top tier. Initially a backup to Marko Dmitrović but later a starter, he severed his ties in August 2026 with 67 competitive appearances across two spells.

=== Académico Viseu ===
Soriano moved abroad for the first time in his career ahead of the 2026–27 campaign, on a two-year deal at Académico de Viseu F.C. in the Primeira Liga. He made his debut on 28 October, in a 1–0 loss away to FC Porto in the quarter-finals of the Taça da Liga.

== International career ==
Soriano earned his only cap for Spain at under-21 level on 27 March 2018, in the 3–1 win over Estonia in the 2019 UEFA European Championship qualifiers.

== Career statistics ==
As of match played 2 June 2024

Appearances and goals by club, season and competition
Club	Season	League			National Cup		Continental		Other		Total	
Club	Season	Division	Apps	Goals	Apps	Goals	Apps	Goals	Apps	Goals	Apps	Goals
Sevilla B	2014–15	Segunda División B	0	0	—		—		—		0	0
Sevilla B	2015–16	Segunda División B	0	0	—		—		—		0	0
Sevilla B	2016–17	Segunda División	6	0	—		—		—		6	0
Sevilla B	2017–18	Segunda División	26	0	—		—		—		26	0
Sevilla B	Total		32	0	0	0	0	0	0	0	32	0
Sevilla	2018–19	La Liga	4	0	6	0	1 (Note: Appearance in UEFA Europa League)	0	0	0	11	0
Leganés (loan)	2019–20	La Liga	11	0	3	0	—		—		14	0
Málaga (loan)	2020–21	Segunda División	18	0	2	0	—		—		20	0
Tenerife	2021–22	Segunda División	41	0	0	0	—		4	0	45	0
Tenerife	2022–23	Segunda División	42	0	0	0	—		—		42	0
Tenerife	2023–24	Segunda División	40	0	0	0	—		—		40	0
Tenerife	Total		123	0	0	0	0	0	4	0	127	0
Career total			188	0	11	0	1	0	4	0	204	0
