= Guille Macho =

Spanish footballer

Personal information
- Full name: Guillermo Macho Muñoz
- Date of birth: 3 January 2003 (age 23)
- Place of birth: Madrid, Spain
- Height: 1.75 m (5 ft 9 in)
- Position: Midfielder

Team information
- Current team: Eldense
- Number: 18

Youth career
- 2013–2021: Atlético Madrid
- 2021–2022: Fuenlabrada

Senior career*
Years	Team	Apps	(Gls)
2022–2023	Alcalá	30	(4)
2023–2024	SS Reyes	31	(2)
2024–2025	Zamora	37	(0)
2025–	Eldense	35	(2)
- * Club domestic league appearances and goals as of 22 August 2026

Guillermo "Guille" Macho Muñoz (born 3 January 2003) is a Spanish footballer who plays as a midfielder for CD Eldense.

== Career ==
Born in Madrid, Macho joined Atlético Madrid's youth sides in 2013, aged ten. He left the club in 2021, and finished his formation with CF Fuenlabrada before signing for Tercera Federación side RSD Alcalá on 4 August 2022.

On 18 July 2023, after being regularly used, Macho moved to UD San Sebastián de los Reyes in the Segunda Federación. Again a first-choice, he agreed to a deal with Primera Federación side Zamora CF roughly one year later.

On 11 July 2025, Macho signed a two-year contract with CD Eldense also in the third division. The following 11 June, after scoring once in 36 matches overall during the season as the club returned to Segunda División at first attempt, he extended his link for a further year.

Macho made his professional debut on 17 August 2026, starting in a 3–0 away loss to UD Almería. He scored his first goal in the second division five days later, netting his side's second through an olympic goal in a 2–2 home draw against Cádiz CF.
