= Fábio Pereira =

Fábio Pereira may refer to:

- Fábio Pereira (footballer, born 1991) (born 1991), Brazilian footballer
- Fábio Pereira (footballer, born 1978) (born 1978), Portuguese football manager
- Fabio (footballer, born 1990), Brazilian footballer born Fabio Pereira da Silva
- Fabinho Azevedo (1977–2018), Brazilian footballer born Fábio Pereira de Azevedo
- Fábio Bala (born 1981), Brazilian footballer born Fábio Pereira de Oliveira
- Pereira (footballer, born 1979), Brazilian footballer born Fábio Pereira da Cruz
- Fábio Baptista (born 2001), Portuguese footballer born Fábio Pereira Baptista

== See also ==
- Fabio Pereyra (born 1990), Argentine footballer
