= Salvi Carrasco =

Spanish footballer

Personal information
- Full name: Salvador Montañez Carrasco
- Date of birth: 25 June 2000 (age 26)
- Place of birth: Málaga, Spain
- Height: 1.92 m (6 ft 4 in)
- Position: Goalkeeper

Team information
- Current team: Unionistas (on loan from União Leiria)
- Number: 1

Youth career
- Puerta Blanca
- 2016–2017: Málaga
- 2017–2019: San Félix

Senior career*
Years	Team	Apps	(Gls)
2019–2020	Vélez	2	(0)
2020	Rincón	13	(0)
2020–2021	Badajoz B	6	(0)
2021	Xerez	8	(0)
2021–2022	San Roque Lepe	8	(0)
2022–2024	Cultural Leonesa	38	(0)
2024	Tarazona	16	(0)
2024–2025	Tenerife	15	(0)
2025–	União Leiria	0	(0)
2026–	→ Unionistas (loan)	11	(0)
- * Club domestic league appearances and goals as of 9 June 2026

Salvador Montañez "Salvi" Carrasco (born 25 June 2000) is a Spanish footballer who plays as a goalkeeper for Primera Federación club Unionistas on loan from Portuguese club União Leiria.

== Career ==
Born in Málaga, Andalusia, Carrasco represented EF Puerta Blanca and Málaga CF as a youth; with the latter, he spent his last two years at affiliate side CD San Félix. On 22 August 2019, after finishing his formation, he signed for Tercera División side Vélez CF.

In January 2020, after being rarely used, Carrasco moved to CD Rincón in the División de Honor Andaluza, before joining CD Badajoz's reserves on 23 July of that year. He left the latter on 26 January 2021, and agreed to a deal with Xerez CD in the fourth division.

On 16 July 2021, Carrasco was announced at Segunda División RFEF side CD San Roque de Lepe. Despite being mainly a backup option during the season, he moved to Primera Federación club Cultural y Deportiva Leonesa on 12 July 2022.

On 24 January 2023, after establishing himself as a regular starter, Carrasco renewed his contract until 2026. Roughly one year later, after losing his starting spot to new signing Miguel Bañuz, he moved to fellow third division side SD Tarazona.

On 7 June 2024, Carrasco signed a two-year contract with Segunda División side CD Tenerife. He made his professional debut on 6 September, starting in a 1–0 home loss to Racing de Santander.

On 18 July 2025, after suffering relegation, Carrasco moved abroad for the first time in his career, after agreeing to a two-year deal with Portuguese side União Leiria. In the first half of the 2025–26 season, Carrasco was not used in any league games by Leiria, but started in all five Taça de Portugal games the club played before it was eliminated in the quarter-finals. On 2 February 2026, Carrasco returned to Spain and joined Primera Federación club Unionistas on loan with an option to buy.
