= Fernando Medrano (footballer) =

Spanish association football player

Personal information
- Full name: Fernando Medrano Gastañaga
- Date of birth: 26 March 2000 (age 26)
- Place of birth: Madrid, Spain
- Height: 1.72 m (5 ft 8 in)
- Position: Left-back

Team information
- Current team: Estoril Praia

Youth career
- 2007–2019: Atlético Madrid

Senior career*
Years	Team	Apps	(Gls)
2019–2021	Atlético Madrid B	35	(2)
2021–2023	Celta B	62	(0)
2023	Celta	1	(0)
2023–2025	Tenerife	39	(0)
2025–2026	Mirandés	33	(2)
2026–	Estoril Praia	0	(0)
- * Club domestic league appearances and goals as of 9 June 2026

Fernando Medrano Gastañaga (born 26 March 2000) is a Spanish professional footballer who plays as a left-back for Portuguese Primeira Liga club Estoril Praia.

== Career ==
A youth product of Atlético Madrid since 2007, Medrano started playing with their reserves in 2019 and joined the senior team for the preseason in the summer of 2020. On 4 March 2020, he signed a professional contract with the club until 2023. After a restructuring of the Spanish League, Atlético Madrid B was moved down 2 divisions, and he moved to the reserves of Celta Vigo on 21 August 2021. He made his senior and professional debut with Celta Vigo as a late substitute in a 2–0 La Liga loss to Real Madrid on 22 April 2023.

On 3 July 2023, Medrano signed a three-year contract with Segunda División side CD Tenerife. On 5 July 2025, after suffering relegation, he moved to fellow league team CD Mirandés on a one-year deal.

On 29 June 2026, Medrano moved abroad for the first time in his career and signed a two-year contract with Estoril Praia in the Portuguese top tier.
