= Jorge Padilla (footballer, born 2001) =

Spanish footballer

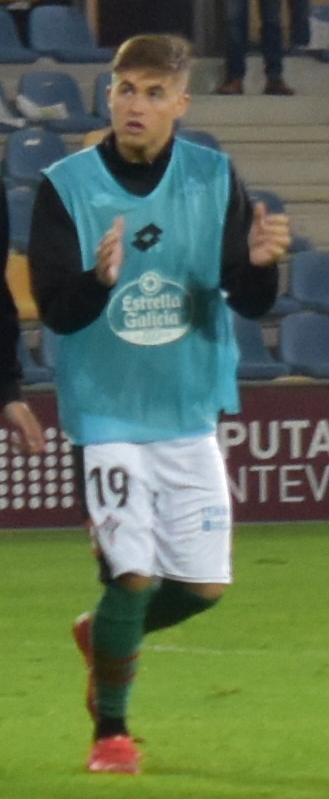
- Padilla with Racing Ferrol in 2022

Personal information
- Full name: Jorge Padilla Soler
- Date of birth: 23 April 2001 (age 25)
- Place of birth: Puerto del Rosario, Spain
- Height: 1.75 m (5 ft 9 in)
- Positions: Winger; forward

Team information
- Current team: Cherno More
- Number: 9

Youth career
- Gran Tarajal
- La Oliva
- Tenerife

Senior career*
Years	Team	Apps	(Gls)
2019–2025	Tenerife	32	(2)
2020–2025	Tenerife B	22	(7)
2021–2022	→ Levante B (loan)	27	(4)
2022–2023	→ Racing Ferrol (loan)	18	(1)
2023–2024	→ Mérida (loan)	22	(0)
2025–2026	Teruel	18	(1)
2026–	Cherno More	11	(1)
- * Club domestic league appearances and goals as of 26 May 2026

Jorge Padilla Soler (born 23 April 2001) is a Spanish professional footballer who plays as a winger or forward for Bulgarian First League club Cherno More Varna.

== Youth career ==
Born in Puerto del Rosario, Fuerteventura, Las Palmas, Canary Islands, Padilla joined CD Tenerife's youth setup from CD La Oliva. On 22 November 2019, before even appearing with the reserves, he featured for the first team as an unused substitute in a 2–0 away defeat of Sporting de Gijón.

== Club career ==
=== Tenerife ===
Padilla made his professional debut on 30 November 2019, replacing Dani Gómez in a 1–3 home loss against UD Almería. He scored his first senior goal on 17 December, netting the opener in a 3–0 away win against CD Mensajero, for the season's Copa del Rey.Padilla scored his first professional goal on 4 January 2020, netting the opener in a 4–2 home defeat of Albacete Balompié. On 3 June, he extended his contract until 2025.

=== Levante B loan ===
On 26 August 2021, Padilla moved to Levante UD on a one-year loan deal, and was assigned to the reserves in Segunda División RFEF.

=== Racing de Ferrol loan ===
On 31 August of the following year, he moved to Primera Federación side Racing de Ferrol also in a temporary deal.

=== Mérida loan ===
On 9 August 2023, after achieving promotion to the second division with Racing, Padilla joined Mérida AD in the third division, on loan for one year.

=== Return to Tenerife ===
Upon returning, he was assigned to the B-team now in Segunda Federación, before being definitely promoted to the main squad on 3 February 2025.

=== Cherno More ===
On 31 January 2026 Jorge Padilla joined bulgarian club Cherno More Varna. Padilla made his debut for Cherno More in the Varna derby against Spartak Varna playing 90 minutes in a 0–0 draw. Padilla scored his first goal in a 3–0 away win against Septemvri Sofia scoring the third goal.
