= Javi Alonso =

Spanish footballer

Personal information
- Full name: Javier Alonso Bello
- Date of birth: 1 August 1998 (age 28)
- Place of birth: Adeje, Spain
- Height: 1.83 m (6 ft 0 in)
- Position: Midfielder

Team information
- Current team: Tenerife B
- Number: 16

Youth career
- Adeje
- Águilas San Aquilino
- Tenerife

Senior career*
Years	Team	Apps	(Gls)
2017–2020	Tenerife B	59	(1)
2018–2025	Tenerife	52	(0)
2024–2025	→ Algeciras (loan)	18	(0)
2025–	Tenerife B	1	(0)
- * Club domestic league appearances and goals as of 16 May 2026

Javier "Javi" Alonso Bello (born 1 August 1998) is a Spanish footballer who plays as a central midfielder for Tenerife B.

== Club career ==
Born in Adeje, Santa Cruz de Tenerife, Canary Islands, Alonso represented EMF Adeje, CD Águilas San Aquilino and CD Tenerife as a youth. He made his debut as a senior with the reserves on 23 April 2017, playing the last 23 minutes in a 1–1 Tercera División home draw against Arucas CF.

Alonso scored his first senior goal on 3 December 2017, netting his team's third in a 7–1 home routing of CD El Cotillo. He made his first team debut on 17 November of the following year, coming on as a late substitute for Iker Undabarrena in a 0–2 away loss against CA Osasuna in the Segunda División.

On 17 February 2021, Alonso renewed his contract until 2025. In July, however, he suffered a knee injury which kept him out of action for the entire 2021–22 season.

On 8 July 2024, after missing most of the 2023–24 campaign due to another knee injury, Alonso moved on loan to Primera Federación side Algeciras CF, for one year.
