= CD Tenerife C =

Spanish football team

Tenerife C
- Full name: Club Deportivo Tenerife, S.A.D. "C"
- Founded: 2005
- Ground: Centro Insular; Santa Cruz de Tenerife, Canary Islands, Spain
- Capacity: 3,000
- President: (Spain) Miguel Concepción
- Head coach: (Spain) Chema Izquierdo
- League: Tercera Federación – Group 12
- 2025–26: Tercera Federación – Group 12, 7th of 18
Home colours	Away colours

Club Deportivo Tenerife "C" is the second reserve team of CD Tenerife. It is based in Santa Cruz de Tenerife, in the autonomous community of the Canary Islands, and currently plays in Tercera Federación – Group 12, holding home games at Centro Insular de Atletismo de Tenerife, with a 3,000-seat capacity.

== History ==
Founded in 2005 as a transition team between the Juvenil and the reserve squads, Tenerife C only played in the Primera Regional until its disbandment in 2011.

In May 2017, Tenerife C was again included in the club's organization charts. Starting back at the Segunda Interinsular, the lowest category of the regional competitions, the club achieved two consecutive promotions as champions.

In the 2019–20 season, the first back at the fifth division, Tenerife C won their group of the league, but was unable to promote to Tercera División as CD Tenerife B was in that category.

== Season to season ==
Season	Tier	Division	Place
2002–03	7	2ª Terr.	1st
2003–04	6	1ª Terr.	1st
2004–05	6	1ª Int.	3rd
2005–06	5	Int. Pref.	9th
2006–07	5	Int. Pref.	7th
2007–08	5	Int. Pref.	7th
2008–09	5	Int. Pref.	5th
2009–10	5	Int. Pref.	6th
2010–11	5	Int. Pref.	8th
2011–2017	DNP		
2017–18	7	2ª Int.	1st
2018–19	6	1ª Int.	1st
2019–20	5	Int. Pref.	1st
2020–21	5	Int. Pref.	2nd
2021–22	6	Int. Pref.	1st
2022–23	6	Int. Pref.	3rd
2023–24	6	Int. Pref.	2nd
2024–25	6	Int. Pref.	2nd
2025–26	5	3ª Fed.	7th
2026–27	5	3ª Fed.	

- 2 seasons in Tercera Federación
