= CD Tenerife B =

Football club in the Canary Islands

Tenerife B
- Full name: Club Deportivo Tenerife, S.A.D. "B"
- Founded: 1960
- Ground: Ciudad Deportiva de Tenerife Javier Pérez; Geneto-Los Baldíos, Canary Islands, Spain
- Capacity: 1,000
- President: (Spain) Miguel Concepción Cáceres
- Head coach: (Spain) Mazinho
- League: Segunda Federación – Group 4
- 2025–26: Segunda Federación – Group 5, 7th of 18
| Home colours | Away colours |

Club Deportivo Tenerife "B" is the reserve team of CD Tenerife, it is based in Santa Cruz de Tenerife, in the autonomous community of the Canary Islands. They currently play in Segunda Federación – Group 4, holding home games at Ciudad Deportiva Javier Pérez, with a 1,000-seat capacity.

== History ==
In 1980, Club Deportivo Salud (founded in 1961 and registered in the Federación Tinerfeña de Fútbol in 1967) was acquired by CD Tenerife, being made its reserve team alongside CD Tenerife Aficionados (founded in 1960 as CD Tenerife Atlético). It first played in the third division in 1989–90.

In 1992, the team was renamed Unión Deportiva Tenerife Salud, competing for the second time in the third level in the 1995–96 campaign, already as Tenerife B, and again being relegated immediately back. It spent the vast majority of the following decades in division four.

== Season to season ==
- Club Deportivo Tenerife "Aficionados"

| Season | Tier | Division | Place | Copa del Rey |
|---|---|---|---|---|
| 1960–61 | 4 | 1ª Reg. | 9th | |
| 1961–62 | 4 | 1ª Reg. | 11th | |
| 1962–63 | DNP | | | |
| 1963–64 | DNP | | | |
| 1964–65 | 5 | 2ª Reg. | 1st | |
| 1965–66 | 4 | 1ª Reg. | 9th | |
| 1966–67 | 4 | 1ª Reg. | 12th | |
| 1967–68 | 4 | 1ª Reg. | 2nd | |
| 1968–69 | 4 | 1ª Reg. | 12th | |
| 1969–70 | 5 | 2ª Reg. | 3rd | |
| 1970–71 | 5 | 2ª Reg. | 2nd | |
| 1971–72 | 4 | 1ª Reg. | 5th | |
| 1972–73 | 4 | 1ª Reg. | 7th | |
| 1973–74 | 4 | 1ª Reg. | 12th | |
| 1974–75 | 5 | 2ª Reg. | | |

| Season | Tier | Division | Place | Copa del Rey |
|---|---|---|---|---|
| 1975–76 | 5 | 2ª Reg. | | |
| 1976–77 | 5 | 2ª Reg. | 4th | |
| 1977–78 | 6 | 1ª Reg. | 3rd | |
| 1978–79 | 5 | Reg. Pref. | 10th | |
| 1979–80 | 5 | Reg. Pref. | 8th | |
| 1980–81 | 4 | 3ª | 9th | |
| 1981–82 | 4 | 3ª | 12th | |
| 1982–83 | 4 | 3ª | 19th | |
| 1983–84 | 5 | Reg. Pref. | 1st | |
| 1984–85 | 4 | 3ª | 14th | |
| 1985–86 | 4 | 3ª | 18th | |
| 1986–87 | 5 | Reg. Pref. | 6th | |
| 1987–88 | 5 | Reg. Pref. | 7th | |
| 1988–89 | 5 | Reg. Pref. | 8th | |
| 1989–90 | 5 | Reg. Pref. | 7th | |

- 5 seasons in Tercera División
- Unión Deportiva Salud

| Season | Tier | Division | Place | Copa del Rey |
|---|---|---|---|---|
| 1967–68 | 5 | 2ª Reg. | | |
| 1968–69 | 5 | 2ª Reg. | 4th | |
| 1969–70 | 5 | 2ª Reg. | 10th | |
| 1970–71 | 5 | 2ª Reg. | 7th | |
| 1971–72 | 5 | 2ª Reg. | | |
| 1972–73 | 5 | 2ª Reg. | 8th | |
| 1973–74 | 5 | 2ª Reg. | | |
| 1974–75 | 5 | 2ª Reg. | | |
| 1975–76 | 5 | 2ª Reg. | | |
| 1976–77 | 5 | 2ª Reg. | | |
| 1977–78 | 7 | 2ª Reg. | 11th | |
| 1978–79 | 7 | 2ª Reg. | | |
| 1979–80 | 7 | 2ª Reg. | 1st | |
| 1980–81 | 6 | 1ª Reg. | 1st | |

| Season | Tier | Division | Place | Copa del Rey |
|---|---|---|---|---|
| 1981–82 | 5 | Reg. Pref. | 1st | |
| 1982–83 | 4 | 3ª | 17th | |
| 1983–84 | 4 | 3ª | 17th | |
| 1984–85 | 4 | 3ª | 17th | |
| 1985–86 | 4 | 3ª | 13th | |
| 1986–87 | 4 | 3ª | 11th | |
| 1987–88 | 4 | 3ª | 5th | |
| 1988–89 | 4 | 3ª | 1st | |
| 1989–90 | 3 | 2ª B | 20th | |
| 1990–91 | 4 | 3ª | 16th | |
| 1991–92 | 4 | 3ª | 11th | |
| 1992–93 | 4 | 3ª | 10th | |
| 1993–94 | 4 | 3ª | 10th | |
| 1994–95 | 4 | 3ª | 2nd | |

- 1 season in Segunda División B
- 12 seasons in Tercera División
- Club Deportivo Tenerife "B"

| Season | Tier | Division | Place |
|---|---|---|---|
| 1995–96 | 3 | 2ª B | 18th |
| 1996–97 | 4 | 3ª | 2nd |
| 1997–98 | 4 | 3ª | 13th |
| 1998–99 | 4 | 3ª | 13th |
| 1999–2000 | 4 | 3ª | 9th |
| 2000–01 | 4 | 3ª | 9th |
| 2001–02 | 4 | 3ª | 5th |
| 2002–03 | 4 | 3ª | 3rd |
| 2003–04 | 4 | 3ª | 18th |
| 2004–05 | 5 | Int. Pref. | 1st |
| 2005–06 | 4 | 3ª | 6th |
| 2006–07 | 4 | 3ª | 10th |
| 2007–08 | 4 | 3ª | 13th |
| 2008–09 | 4 | 3ª | 1st |
| 2009–10 | 3 | 2ª B | 19th |
| 2010–11 | 4 | 3ª | 3rd |
| 2011–12 | 4 | 3ª | 8th |
| 2012–13 | 4 | 3ª | 6th |
| 2013–14 | 4 | 3ª | 4th |
| 2014–15 | 4 | 3ª | 7th |

| Season | Tier | Division | Place |
|---|---|---|---|
| 2015–16 | 4 | 3ª | 9th |
| 2016–17 | 4 | 3ª | 5th |
| 2017–18 | 4 | 3ª | 1st |
| 2018–19 | 4 | 3ª | 4th |
| 2019–20 | 4 | 3ª | 6th |
| 2020–21 | 4 | 3ª | 5th / 2nd |
| 2021–22 | 5 | 3ª RFEF | 3rd |
| 2022–23 | 5 | 3ª Fed. | 6th |
| 2023–24 | 5 | 3ª Fed. | 1st |
| 2024–25 | 4 | 2ª Fed. | 9th |
| 2025–26 | 4 | 2ª Fed. | 7th |
| 2026–27 | 4 | 2ª Fed. | |

- 2 seasons in Segunda División B
- 3 seasons in Segunda Federación
- 23 seasons in Tercera División
- 3 seasons in Tercera Federación/Tercera División RFEF

== Honours ==
- Tercera División: (3) 1988–89, 2008–09, 2017–18
- Copa Heliodoro Rodríguez López: (5) 2001–02, 2002–03 2007–08, 2008–09, 2014–15
- Preferente Tenerife: (2) 1981–82, 2004–05

== Current squad ==
As of 14 September 2026

Note: Flags indicate national team as defined under FIFA eligibility rules; some limited exceptions apply. Players may hold more than one non-FIFA nationality.

| No. | Pos. | Nation | Player |
|---|---|---|---|
| 1 | GK | ESP | Sergio Aragoneses |
| 2 | DF | ESP | Jesús Belza |
| 3 | DF | ESP | Pau Fernández |
| 4 | DF | ESP | Kevin Martel |
| 5 | DF | ESP | Tito Cordero |
| 6 | MF | ESP | Yerover Gómez |
| 7 | FW | ESP | Dani Álvarez |
| 8 | MF | ESP | Joel Pérez |
| 9 | FW | ESP | Óscar Bazaga |
| 10 | MF | ESP | Dylan Perera |
| 11 | FW | ESP | Christian Hernández |
| 13 | GK | ESP | Oier Gastesi |
| 15 | DF | ESP | Isma Muñoz |

| No. | Pos. | Nation | Player |
|---|---|---|---|
| 16 | MF | ESP | Manu Vila |
| 17 | DF | ESP | Giovani García |
| 20 | MF | ESP | Omar Sánchez |
| 21 | MF | ESP | Juliano de Souza |
| 22 | FW | ESP | Álex Peke |
| 23 | DF | ESP | Sergio Fernández |
| 24 | FW | MAR | Amara Laghdaf |
| 25 | FW | USA | Jaedon Richardson |
| 32 | DF | ESP | Álex Llorens |
| 39 | FW | ESP | Dailo Suárez |
| — | GK | ESP | José Antonio Sosa |
| — | DF | ESP | Nehuén Monserrat |
| — | MF | CIV | Ibrahim Baldé |

=== Youth players ===
Note: Flags indicate national team as defined under FIFA eligibility rules; some limited exceptions apply. Players may hold more than one non-FIFA nationality.

| No. | Pos. | Nation | Player |
|---|---|---|---|
| 28 | DF | ESP | Fernando Cruz |
| 33 | MF | ESP | Josito |

| No. | Pos. | Nation | Player |
|---|---|---|---|
| 37 | FW | ESP | Manuel Montero |
