= 2021–22 CD Tenerife season =

CD Tenerife
2021–22 season
- Owner: Miguel Concepción
- President: Miguel Concepción
- Head coach: Luis Miguel Ramis
- Stadium: Estadio Heliodoro Rodríguez López
- Segunda División: 5th
- Play-offs: Finals
- Copa del Rey: Second round
- Top goalscorer: League: Elady Zorrilla (11); All: Elady Zorrilla (11)
Home colours	Away colours	Third colours

The 2021–22 season was the 110th season in the existence of CD Tenerife and the club's ninth consecutive season in the second division of Spanish football. In addition to the domestic league, Tenerife participated in this season's edition of the Copa del Rey.

== Players ==
=== First-team squad ===
As of 2 February 2022

Note: Flags indicate national team as defined under FIFA eligibility rules; some limited exceptions apply. Players may hold more than one non-FIFA nationality.

No.	Pos.	Nation	Player
1	GK	ESP	Juan Soriano
2	MF	ESP	Pablo Larrea
3	DF	ESP	Álex Muñoz
4	DF	ESP	José León
6	MF	ESP	Álex Corredera
7	FW	ESP	Mario González (on loan from Braga)
8	MF	ESP	Javi Alonso
9	FW	ESP	Elady Zorrilla
10	MF	ENG	Samuel Shashoua
11	MF	ESP	Álex Bermejo
12	DF	ESP	Sergio González
13	GK	VEN	Dani Hernández
14	DF	ESP	Carlos Ruiz
15	DF	ESP	Carlos Pomares
16	MF	ESP	Aitor Sanz (captain)

No.	Pos.	Nation	Player
17	MF	ESP	Matías Nahuel
18	FW	ESP	Enric Gallego
19	MF	ESP	Rubén Díez
20	FW	ESP	Andrés Martín (on loan from Rayo)
21	DF	USA	Shaq Moore
22	DF	FRA	Jérémy Mellot
23	DF	MNE	Nikola Šipčić
24	MF	ESP	Míchel Herrero
26	MF	ESP	Félix Alonso
27	FW	ESP	Ethyan González
28	FW	ESP	Víctor Mollejo (on loan from Atlético Madrid)
30	GK	ESP	Víctor Méndez
31	FW	GUI	Thierno Barry
32	DF	ESP	David Rodríguez
34	MF	ESP	Teto

=== Reserve team ===
Note: Flags indicate national team as defined under FIFA eligibility rules; some limited exceptions apply. Players may hold more than one non-FIFA nationality.

No.	Pos.	Nation	Player
33	DF	ESP	Jeremy Socorro
35	MF	ESP	Dylan Perera

No.	Pos.	Nation	Player
40	GK	ESP	Alejandro Medina

=== Out on loan ===
Note: Flags indicate national team as defined under FIFA eligibility rules; some limited exceptions apply. Players may hold more than one non-FIFA nationality.

No.	Pos.	Nation	Player
—	DF	ESP	Alberto Jiménez (at Albacete until 30 June 2022)
—	MF	ESP	Álex Benítez (at Mensajero until 30 June 2022)
—	FW	ESP	Elliot Gómez (at Hércules until 30 June 2022)
—	FW	ESP	Borja Llarena (at Costa Brava until 30 June 2022)

No.	Pos.	Nation	Player
—	FW	ESP	Joel Caballero (at San Fernando until 30 June 2022)
—	FW	ESP	Jorge Padilla (at Atlético Levante until 30 June 2022)
—	FW	ESP	Joselu (at Lugo until 30 June 2022)
—	FW	NGR	Manu Apeh (at Alcorcón until 30 June 2022)

== Pre-season and friendlies ==
Win Draw Loss Fixtures

28 July 2021 Friendly	Elche	2–2	Tenerife	San Pedro del Pinatar, Spain
21:30 CEST (UTC+2)	Morente 59'; Justo 85'		Barry 74'; Corredera 81'	Stadium: Pinatar Arena Football Center; Attendance: 0

== Competitions ==
=== Overall record ===
Competition	First match	Last match	Starting round	Final position	Record							
Competition	First match	Last match	Starting round	Final position	Pld	W	D	L	GF	GA	GD	Win %
Segunda División	15 August 2021	29 May 2022	Matchday 1	5th	42	20	9	13	53	37	+16	47.62
Segunda División promotion play-offs	1 June 2022	19 June 2022	Semi-finals	Finals	4	2	1	1	4	4	+0	50.00
Copa del Rey	2 December 2021	15 December 2021	First round	Second round	2	1	0	1	3	3	+0	50.00
Total					48	23	10	15	60	44	+16	47.92

Source: Soccerway

=== Segunda División ===
==== League table ====
Pos	Team	Pld	W	D	L	GF	GA	GD	Pts	Qualification or relegation
3	Eibar	42	23	11	8	61	45	+16	80	Qualification for promotion play-offs
4	Las Palmas	42	19	13	10	57	47	+10	70	Qualification for promotion play-offs
5	Tenerife	42	20	9	13	53	37	+16	69	Qualification for promotion play-offs
6	Girona (O, P)	42	20	8	14	57	42	+15	68 (Note: Girona finished ahead of Oviedo on head-to-head points: Girona 2–1 Oviedo, Oviedo 0–0 Girona.)	Qualification for promotion play-offs
7	Oviedo	42	17	17	8	57	41	+16	68	

Source: LaLiga SmartBank
Rules for classification: 1) points; 2) head-to-head points; 3) head-to-head goal difference; 4) goal difference; 5) number of goals scored
(O) Play-off winners; (P) Promoted

==== Results summary ====
Overall								Home						Away					
Pld	W	D	L	GF	GA	GD	Pts	W	D	L	GF	GA	GD	W	D	L	GF	GA	GD
42	20	9	13	53	37	+16	69	9	5	7	27	18	+9	11	4	6	26	19	+7

Source: La Liga SmartBank

==== Results by round ====
Round	1	2	3	4	5	6	7	8	9	10	11	12	13	14	15	16	17	18	19	20	21	22	23	24	25	26	27	28	29	30	31	32	33	34	35	36	37	38	39	40	41	42
Ground	A	H	A	H	A	H	A																																			
Result	W	D	D	W	W	L																																				
Position	4	7	9	4	3	4	5	4	4	6	7	5	3	4	3	4	3	3	4	4	3	4	4	4	4	4	4	4	4	4	4	4	5	5	4	4	4	4	4	4	4	5

Source: La Liga SmartBank
A = Away; H = Home; W = Win; D = Draw; L = Loss

==== Matches ====
The league fixtures were announced on 30 June 2021.

15 August 2021 1	Fuenlabrada	1–2	Tenerife	Fuenlabrada
22:00 CEST (UTC+2)	Mula 67'	Report	Bermejo 5'; Corredera 90+4'	Stadium: Fernando Torres; Attendance: 1,184; Referee: Saúl Ais Reig

21 August 2021 2	Tenerife	0–0	Sporting Gijón	Santa Cruz de Tenerife
18:30 WEST (UTC+1)		Report		Stadium: Heliodoro Rodríguez López; Referee: Rubén Ávalos Barrera

28 August 2021 3	Oviedo	0–0	Tenerife	Oviedo
19:30 CEST (UTC+2)		Report		Stadium: Carlos Tartiere; Referee: José Antonio López Toca

4 September 2021 4	Tenerife	2–0	Ponferradina	Santa Cruz de Tenerife
17:15 WEST (UTC+1)	Elady 52'; Muñoz 63'	Report		Stadium: Heliodoro Rodríguez López; Referee: Francisco José Hernández Maeso

12 September 2021 5	Valladolid	0–2	Tenerife	Valladolid
16:00 CEST (UTC+2)		Report	Shashoua 11'; Jiménez 29' (o.g.)	Stadium: José Zorrilla; Referee: David Gálvez Rascón

19 September 2021 6	Tenerife	1–2	Mirandés	Santa Cruz de Tenerife
17:15 WEST (UTC+1)				Stadium: Heliodoro Rodríguez López

24 September 2021 7	Almería	3–1	Tenerife	Almería
21:00 CEST (UTC+2)				Stadium: Estadio de los Juegos Mediterráneos

2 October 2021 8	Huesca	1–2	Tenerife	Huesca
16:00 CEST (UTC+2)	Joaquín Muñoz 31' (yellow card) 50'; Nwakali (yellow card) 45'	Report	Jamelli (yellow card) 9'; Álex Corredera 34'; Elady Zorrilla (yellow card) 50'; Shashoua 56' (yellow card) 90+2'; Míchel (yellow card) 68'	Stadium: Estadio El Alcoraz; Attendance: 6,826; Referee: (Spain) Jon González Esteban

10 October 2021 9	Tenerife	2–1	Amorebieta	Santa Cruz de Tenerife
18:15 CEST (UTC+2)	Elady Zorrilla 29'; Mellot (yellow card) 33' (yellow-red card) 38'; Aitor Sanz (yellow card) 38'; Shashoua 64' (pen.) (yellow card) 90+4'; Sergio González (yellow card) 90+3'	Report	Olaetxea (yellow card) 27'; Jon Irazabal (yellow card) 64'; Asier Etxaburu 70'	Stadium: Heliodoro Rodríguez López; Attendance: 12,572; Referee: (Spain) Víctor García Verdura

16 October 2021 10	Las Palmas	2–1	Tenerife	Las Palmas
18:15 CEST (UTC+2)	Jonathan Viera 26'; Loiodice (yellow card) 54'; Eric Curbelo (yellow card) 63'; Raúl Fernández (yellow card) 82'; Álvaro Lemos 90+2'	Report	Carlos Ruiz (yellow card) 16'; Elady Zorrilla 65'; Álex Bermejo (yellow card) 70'; Álex Muñoz (yellow card) 77'; Moore (yellow card) 80'; Víctor Mollejo (yellow card) 90+4'	Stadium: Estadio Gran Canaria; Attendance: 25,887; Referee: (Spain) Eduardo Prieto Iglesias

19 October 2021 11	Tenerife	0–1	Eibar	Santa Cruz de Tenerife
21:00 CEST (UTC+2)	Álex Corredera (yellow card) 33'; Pablo Larrea (yellow card) 35'; Víctor Mollejo (yellow card) 81' (red card) 86'; Míchel (yellow card) 90+2'	Report	Burgos (yellow card) 72'; Álvaro Tejero 75'	Stadium: Heliodoro Rodríguez López; Attendance: 9,283; Referee: (Spain) Iosu Galech Apezteguía

23 October 2021 12	Leganés	1–2	Tenerife	Leganés
21:00 CEST (UTC+2)	Sergio González 65'; Rubén Pardo (red card) 90+8'	Report	Elady Zorrilla 19' (yellow card) 69' (goal) 81'; Carlos Ruiz (yellow card) 30'; Álex Muñoz (yellow card) 90+7'	Stadium: Estadio Municipal de Butarque; Attendance: 6,454; Referee: (Spain) Oliver De La Fuente

1 November 2021 13	Tenerife	4–0	Burgos	Santa Cruz de Tenerife
21:00 WET (UTC+1)	Víctor Mollejo 5'; Shashoua 41'; Álex Bermejo (yellow card) 52' (goal) 54'; Álex Muñoz (yellow card) 71'; Enric Gallego 81'; Carlos Ruiz (yellow card) 90+2'	Report	Grego (yellow card) 26'	Stadium: Heliodoro Rodríguez López; Attendance: 12,105; Referee: (Spain) José López Toca

4 November 2021 14	Ibiza	0–0	Tenerife	Ibiza
21:15 CET (UTC+2)	David Morillas (yellow card) 12'; Appin (yellow card) 52'	Report		Stadium: Estadi Municipal de Can Misses; Attendance: 3,501; Referee: (Spain) Jon González Esteban

8 November 2021 15	Tenerife	2–1	Girona	Santa Cruz de Tenerife
20:00 WET (UTC+1)	Aitor Sanz (yellow card) 2'; Mellot 14'; Enric Gallego 80'; Pablo Larrea (red card) 87'; Sergio González (yellow card) 88'	Report	Bueno (yellow card) 25'; Álex Baena 46'; Espinosa (yellow card) 55'	Stadium: Heliodoro Rodríguez López; Attendance: 10,121; Referee: (Spain) Gorka Sagués Oscoz

15 November 2021 16	Málaga	1–0	Tenerife	Málaga
21:00 CET (UTC+2)	Brandon Thomas 15' (pen.) (yellow card) 83'; Jozabed (yellow card) 19'; Genaro Rodríguez (yellow card) 50'; Iván Calero (yellow card) 74'; Javi Jiménez (yellow card) 78'	Report	Víctor Mollejo (yellow card) 21'	Stadium: La Rosaleda Stadium; Attendance: 15,700; Referee: (Spain) Rafael Sánchez López

21 November 2021 17	Tenerife	1–0	Alcorcón	Santa Cruz de Tenerife
17:15 WET (UTC+1)	Apeh 55'; Míchel (yellow card) 75'	Report	Gorosito (yellow card) 6'; Laure (yellow card) 20'; Zarfino (yellow card) 37'; Hugo Fraile (yellow card) 41'	Stadium: Heliodoro Rodríguez López; Attendance: 11,810; Referee: (Spain) Alejandro Quintero González

28 November 2021 18	Tenerife	2–0	Real Sociedad B	Santa Cruz de Tenerife
18:15 CET (UTC+2)	Gallego (yellow card) 9', (goal) 17'; Soriano (yellow card) 37'; Michel 87'	Report	Blasco (yellow card) 61'; Pokorný (yellow card) 70'; López (yellow card) 90+1'; Rodríguez (yellow card) 90+4'	Stadium: Heliodoro Rodríguez López; Attendance: 9,850; Referee: (Spain) José López

6 December 2021 19	FC Cartagena	1–1	Tenerife	Cartagena
18:15 CET (UTC+2)	Dauda (yellow card) 55' (yellow-red card) 77'; Álex Gallar 59' (yellow card) 90+2'; Bodiger (yellow card) 90+5'	Report	José León (yellow card) 24'; Aitor Sanz (yellow card) 45'; Mellot (yellow card) 69'; Enric Gallego 87'	Stadium: Estadio Cartagonova; Attendance: 7,441; Referee: (Spain) Iosu Galech Apezteguía

11 December 2021 20	Tenerife	1–1	Lugo	Santa Cruz de Tenerife
20:00 WEST (UTC+1)	Elady Zorrilla 38'; Álex Muñoz (yellow card) 41'; Šipčić (yellow card) 49'; Shashoua (yellow card) 61'; Míchel (yellow card) 76'; Ethyan (red card) 90+8'	Report	Edu Campabadal (yellow card) 32'; Óscar Whalley (yellow card) 62'; Carrillo 89' (pen.); Ricard Sánchez (yellow card) 90+1'	Stadium: Heliodoro Rodríguez López; Attendance: 9,617; Referee: (Spain) David Gálvez Rascón

19 December 2021 21	Zaragoza	0–2	Tenerife	Zaragoza
16:00 CET (UTC+1)	Petrović (yellow card) 37'; Borja Sainz (yellow card) 50'	Report	Elady Zorrilla 20'; Víctor Mollejo 28' (yellow card) 37'; Carlos Pomares (yellow card) 66'; Mellot (yellow card) 88'	Stadium: La Romareda; Attendance: 15,283; Referee: (Spain) Alejandro Quintero González

2 January 2022 22	Tenerife	0–1	Las Palmas	Santa Cruz de Tenerife
20:30 WEST (UTC+1)	Aitor Sanz (yellow card) 58'	Report	Álex Díez (yellow card) 45+2'; Kirian Rodríguez 72'; Raúl Fernández (yellow card) 90+2'	Stadium: Heliodoro Rodríguez López; Attendance: 10,756; Referee: (Spain) Jon González Esteban

7 January 2022 23	Amorebieta	1–1	Tenerife	Amorebieta-Etxano
21:00 CEST (UTC+2)	Iker Bilbao (yellow card) 5'; Gorka Guruzeta 14'; Gaizka Larrazabal (yellow card) 26'	Report	Enric Gallego 27' (pen.); Aitor Sanz (yellow card) 65'	Stadium: Urritxe; Referee: (Spain) Víctor García Verdura

21 January 2022 24	Tenerife	4–0	Oviedo	Santa Cruz de Tenerife
20:00 WEST (UTC+1)	Víctor Mollejo 6'; Elady Zorrilla 14'; Enric Gallego (yellow card) 24'; Míchel 79'; Jamelli 88'	Report	Mossa (yellow card) 44'; Carlos Isaac (yellow card) 61'; Lucas Ahijado (yellow card) 73'	Stadium: Heliodoro Rodríguez López; Attendance: 7,319; Referee: (Spain) Oliver De La Fuente

30 January 2022 25	Ponferradina	1–2	Tenerife	Ponferrada
21:00 CEST (UTC+2)	Dani Ojeda (yellow card) 18'; Yuri 42' (yellow card) 90+2'; Anton (yellow card) 61'; Copete (yellow card) 73'; José Antonio Ríos (yellow card) 75'; Cristian Rodríguez (yellow card) 90+7'	Report	Elady Zorrilla 71' (pen.); Enric Gallego 78'	Stadium: Estadio El Toralín; Attendance: 3,963; Referee: (Spain) Gorka Sagués Oscoz

6 February 2022 26	Tenerife	0–0	Leganés	Santa Cruz de Tenerife
20:00 WEST (UTC+1)		Report	Rubén Pardo (yellow card) 83'; Borja Garcés (yellow card) 90+1'	Stadium: Heliodoro Rodríguez López; Attendance: 11,040; Referee: (Spain) Aitor Gorostegui Fernández

13 February 2022 27	Alcorcón	0–2	Tenerife	Alcorcón
18:15 CEST (UTC+2)	José Ángel (yellow card) 40'	Report	Álex Muñoz 37'; Aitor Sanz (yellow card) 48'; David Fernández 51' (o.g.)	Stadium: Estadio Municipal de Santo Domingo; Attendance: 2,425; Referee: (Spain) Saúl Ais Reig

19 February 2022 28	Tenerife	2–0	Ibiza	Santa Cruz de Tenerife
17:15 WEST (UTC+1)	Mario González 4' 18'	Report	David Goldar (yellow card) 62'; Escobar (yellow card) 69'; Juan Ibiza (yellow card) 81'	Stadium: Heliodoro Rodríguez López; Attendance: 13,087; Referee: (Spain) Rubén Ávalos Barrera

26 February 2022 29	Mirandés	2–1	Tenerife	Miranda de Ebro
16:00 CEST (UTC+2)	Oriol Rey (yellow card) 9'; Imanol García de Albéniz 18'; Sergio Camello 33' (yellow card) 52'; Rodrigo Riquelme (yellow card) 52'; Víctor Meseguer (yellow card) 79'	Report	Jamelli (yellow card) 19'; Elady Zorrilla 45+2'; Sergio González (yellow card) 52'; José León (yellow card) 65'; Aitor Sanz (red card) 73'	Stadium: Estadio Municipal de Anduva; Attendance: 2,652; Referee: (Spain) Dámaso Arcediano Monescillo

5 March 2022 30	Tenerife	1–4	Valladolid	Santa Cruz de Tenerife
17:15 WEST (UTC+1)	Mellot (yellow card) 19'; Víctor Mollejo (yellow card) 36'; Álex Bermejo (yellow card) 43'; Carlos Pomares (yellow card) 45'; Álex Corredera (yellow card) 67'; Andrés Martín 71'; Carlos Ruiz (yellow card) 74'; Matías Nahuel (yellow card) 77'	Report	El Yamiq 21'; Toni Villa (yellow card) 34'; Plata 59'; Javi Sánchez 64'; Luis Pérez 80'	Stadium: Heliodoro Rodríguez López; Attendance: 18,538; Referee: (Spain) Francisco Hernández Maeso

13 March 2022 31	Sporting de Gijón	1–2	Tenerife	Gijón
16:00 CEST (UTC+2)	Gaspar Campos (yellow card) 42'; Đurđević 50'	Report	Aitor Sanz (yellow card) 13'; Enric Gallego 53' 83'; Mario González (yellow card) 72'; Pablo Larrea (yellow card) 90+2'; Juan Soriano (yellow card) 90+4'	Stadium: El Molinón; Attendance: 14,002; Referee: (Spain) Luis Milla Alvendiz

21 March 2022 32	Tenerife	0–1	Almería	Santa Cruz de Tenerife
20:00 WEST (UTC+1)	Álex Corredera (yellow card) 45+1'; Aitor Sanz (yellow card) 58'; Shaq Moore (yellow card) 60'	Report	Ramazani 59' (pen.); Samú Costa (yellow card) 64'; Babić (yellow card) 69'	Stadium: Heliodoro Rodríguez López; Attendance: 15,007; Referee: (Spain) Oliver De La Fuente

27 March 2022 33	Burgos	1–0	Tenerife	Burgos
16:00 CEST (UTC+2)	Miguel Ángel 62'; Raúl Navarro (yellow card) 64'; Roberto Alarcón (yellow card) 90'	Report	Pablo Larrea (yellow card) 38'; Enric Gallego (yellow card) 51'	Stadium: Estadio El Plantío; Attendance: 8,898; Referee: (Spain) Eduardo Prieto Iglesias

2 April 2022 34	Tenerife	1–1	Zaragoza	Santa Cruz de Tenerife
19:30 WEST (UTC+1)	Shashoua 22'; Juan Soriano (yellow card) 73'	Report	Vada 15'; Sergio Bermejo (yellow card) 68'	Stadium: Heliodoro Rodríguez López; Attendance: 12,050; Referee: (Spain) David Gálvez Rascón

9 April 2022 35	Real Sociedad B	1–2	Tenerife	San Sebastián
16:00 CEST (UTC+2)	Olasagasti (yellow card) 68'; Robert Navarro 81'	Report	Mario González 10'; Álex Bermejo (yellow card) 29'; Elady Zorrilla 86'	Stadium: Reale Arena; Attendance: 4,941; Referee: (Spain) Rubén Ávalos Barrera

17 April 2022 36	Tenerife	3–1	Fuenlabrada	Santa Cruz de Tenerife
17:15 WEST (UTC+1)	Enric Gallego 27' 40'; Pablo Larrea (yellow card) 39'; Mario González 53'	Report	Kanté (yellow card) 41'; Javier Ontiveros (yellow card) 45+1'; Adrián Diéguez (yellow card) 56'; Konaté (yellow card) 61' (yellow-red card) 74'; Pedro León 64' (pen.); Rubén Pulido (yellow card) 88'	Stadium: Heliodoro Rodríguez López; Attendance: 11,750; Referee: (Spain) Iván Caparrós Hernández

22 April 2022 37	Tenerife	0–0	Huesca	Santa Cruz de Tenerife
20:00 WEST (UTC+1)	Aitor Sanz (yellow card) 65'; Víctor Mollejo (yellow card) 88'; Carlos Pomares (yellow card) 90+4'	Report	Jorge Pulido (yellow card) 46'; Marc Mateu (yellow card) 77'; Rațiu (yellow card) 81'; Ignasi Miquel (yellow card) 90'; Miguel (yellow card) 90+3'	Stadium: Heliodoro Rodríguez López; Attendance: 11,896; Referee: (Spain) Víctor García Verdura

1 May 2022 38	Lugo	0–2	Tenerife	Lugo
18:15 CEST (UTC+2)		Report	Mario González 64'; Andrés Martín 78'	Stadium: Estadio Anxo Carro; Attendance: 2,580; Referee: (Spain) Francisco Hernández Maeso

9 May 2022 39	Girona	0–1	Tenerife	Girona
21:00 CEST (UTC+2)	Stuani (yellow card) 45+1'; Álex Baena (yellow card) 76' (yellow-red card) 90+6'; Samuel Sáiz (yellow card) 87'	Report	Mario González 40'; Juan Soriano (yellow card) 45+1'; Elady Zorrilla (yellow card) 62'; Aitor Sanz (yellow card) 86'; Andrés Martín (yellow card) 90'	Stadium: Estadi Montilivi; Attendance: 6,587; Referee: (Spain) Jon González Esteban

15 May 2022 40	Tenerife	0–2	Málaga	Santa Cruz de Tenerife
20:00 WEST (UTC+1)	Aitor Sanz (yellow card) 37'; Enric Gallego (yellow card) 71'; Míchel (yellow card) 85'; Carlos Pomares (yellow card) 86'	Report	Álvaro Vadillo 8'; Víctor Olmo (yellow card) 31'; Aleix Febas 48'; Peybernes (yellow card) 57'; Chavarría (yellow card) 85'; Brandon Thomas (yellow card) 90+3'	Stadium: Heliodoro Rodríguez López; Attendance: 14,636; Referee: (Spain) Eduardo Prieto Iglesias

21 May 2022 41	Eibar	2–0	Tenerife	Eibar
22:00 CEST (UTC+2)	Stoichkov 19'; Edu Expósito (yellow card) 57'; Chema 84'	Report	Enric Gallego (yellow card) 28'; Šipčić (yellow card) 30'; Matías Nahuel (yellow card) 68'	Stadium: Ipurua; Attendance: 7,131; Referee: (Spain) Rubén Ávalos Barrera

29 May 2022 42	Tenerife	1–2	FC Cartagena	Santa Cruz de Tenerife
19:00 WEST (UTC+1)	Aitor Sanz (yellow card) 11'; Víctor Mollejo (yellow card) 38'; Enric Gallego (yellow card) 61'; Šipčić 63'; Míchel (yellow card) 70'; Carlos Ruiz (yellow card) 72'	Report	Alfredo Ortuño 12' (pen.); Buffarini 22'; de Blasis (yellow card) 71'	Stadium: Heliodoro Rodríguez López; Attendance: 14,525; Referee: (Spain) Iosu Galech Apezteguía

==== Promotion play-offs ====
1 June 2022 Semi-finals; First leg	Tenerife	1–0	Las Palmas	Santa Cruz de Tenerife
20:00 WEST (UTC+1)				Stadium: Heliodoro Rodríguez López

4 June 2022 Semi-finals; Second leg	Las Palmas	1–2 (1–3 agg.)	Tenerife	Las Palmas
20:00 WEST (UTC+1)				Stadium: Estadio Gran Canaria

11 June 2022 Finals; First leg	Girona	0–0	Tenerife	Girona
21:00 CEST (UTC+2)	Pol Lozano (yellow card) 25'; Álex Baena (yellow card) 75'	Report	Elady Zorrilla (yellow card) 68'; Andrés Martín (yellow card) 90+1'	Stadium: Montilivi; Attendance: 11,309; Referee: (Spain) Francisco Hernández Maeso

19 June 2022 Finals; Second leg	Tenerife	1–3 (1–3 agg.)	Girona	Santa Cruz de Tenerife
20:00 WEST (UTC+1)	Álex Corredera (yellow card) 13'; Enric Gallego (yellow card) 31'; Sergio González (yellow card) 41'; Carlos Ruiz 59'	Report	Juanpe (yellow card) 32'; Stuani 42' (pen.); José León 68' (o.g.); Álex Baena (yellow card) 68'; Arnau Martínez 80'; Samuel Sáiz (yellow card) 80'; Pablo Moreno (yellow card) 80'; Aleix García (yellow card) 90'; Víctor Sánchez (yellow card) 90+8'	Stadium: Heliodoro Rodríguez López; Attendance: 22,077; Referee: (Spain) Dámaso Arcediano Monescillo

=== Copa del Rey ===
15 December 2021 Second round	Tenerife	1–2	Eibar	Santa Cruz de Tenerife
20:00 WEST (UTC+1)		Report		Stadium: Heliodoro Rodríguez López
