= 2018–19 Copa Catalunya =

Catalonia Cup

Tournament details
- Country: Catalonia (Spain)
- Teams: 31

Final positions
- Champions: Sant Andreu
- Runner-up: Vilafranca

Tournament statistics
- Matches played: 30
- Goals scored: 59 (1.97 per match)
- Top goal scorer(s): Pedro Martín (3)

The 2018–19 Copa Catalunya is the 30th staging of the Copa Catalunya. The competition began on 28 July 2018 and will be played by teams in Segunda División, Segunda División B, Tercera División and the top teams of Primera Catalana.

== Qualified teams ==
The following teams compete in the 2018–19 Copa Catalunya.

3 teams of 2017–18 Segunda División

- Barcelona B
- Gimnàstic
- Reus

7 teams of 2017–18 Segunda División B

- Badalona
- Cornellà
- Llagostera
- Lleida Esportiu
- Olot
- Peralada
- Sabadell

18 teams of 2017–18 Tercera División

- Ascó
- Castelldefels
- Cerdanyola
- Espanyol B
- Europa
- Figueres
- Gavà
- Granollers
- Horta
- L'Hospitalet
- Palamós
- Prat
- Sant Andreu
- Santboià
- Santfeliuenc
- Terrassa
- Vilafranca
- Vilassar de Mar

3 teams of 2017–18 Primera Catalana

- FE Grama
- San Cristóbal
- Sants

== Tournament ==
=== First round ===
Matches were played on 28 and 29 July 2018.

28 July 2018	Prat	1–1 (2–4 p)	Ascó	El Prat de Llobregat
19:30	Ricarte 29'	FCF.cat	89' Artur	Stadium: Sagnier; Referee: Rubén Mancera Antón

28 July 2018	Sants	1–0	Castelldefels	Barcelona
19:30	Navarro 51'	Betevé		Stadium: L'Energia

28 July 2018	Palamós	0–1	Badalona	Palamós
20:00		FCF.cat	26' Díaz	Stadium: Palamós Costa Brava; Referee: Germán Carrasco Baca

28 July 2018	Santfeliuenc	0–1	Cornellà	Sant Feliu de Llobregat
20:00		Fet Sant Feliu	90+1' Goldar	Stadium: Les Grases; Attendance: 557; Referee: Josep Ollé Lladó

28 July 2018	FE Grama	1–0	Sabadell	Santa Coloma de Gramenet
20:00	Cristóbal 90'	iSabadell		Stadium: Nou Municipal; Referee: Víctor Sánchez

28 July 2018	Figueres	0–2	Horta	Figueres
20:00		Betevé	25' Río; 63' Tacón	Stadium: Vilatenim; Attendance: 557; Referee: Josep Ollé Lladó

28 July 2018	Gavà	1–4	Lleida Esportiu	Gavà
19:00	Quiles 20'	FCF.cat	41' Carbonell; 64', 68', 80' Pedro Martín	Stadium: La Bòbila; Referee: Néstor Herráez Prieto

28 July 2018	Santboià	1–3	Vilafranca	Sant Boi de Llobregat
19:30	Bellido 56'	FCF.cat	3' Gestí; 14' Ricky; 33' Oribe	Stadium: Joan Baptista Milà; Referee: Carlos Rodríguez Enrique

28 July 2018	Hospitalet	2–1	Europa	L'Hospitalet de Llobregat
19:30	Tobella 29'; Salinas 65'	Betevé	77' Serra	Stadium: La Feixa Llarga

28 July 2018	San Cristóbal	0–2	Terrassa	Terrassa
19:30		FCF.cat	26' Savall; 32' Toledo	Stadium: Ca n'Anglada; Referee: Óscar Carballo Vázquez

28 July 2018	Espanyol B	3–1	Olot	Barcelona
19:00	Campuzano 24'; Ángel 39'; Pau 82'	FCF.cat	32' Xumetra	Stadium: Ciutat Esportiva Dani Jarque; Referee: Jaume Gibert González

28 July 2018	Cerdanyola	1–1 (4–5 p)	Peralada	Cerdanyola del Vallès
19:30	Dani Martí 55'	FCF.cat	9' Pachón	Stadium: La Boblià i Pinetons; Referee: Héctor Robas Bondia
Note: The match was awarded 3–0 to Cerdanyola due to Peralada only fielding five registered players in the match.

28 July 2018	Granollers	1–0	Llagostera	Granollers
19:30	Kilian 80'	Diari de Girona		Stadium: Carrer Girona

28 July 2018	Sant Andreu	2–0	Vilassar de Mar	Barcelona
20:30	Víctor Alonso 33'; Carlos Martínez 55'	Betevé		Stadium: Narcís Sala

=== Second round ===
Matches were played between 4 and 12 August 2018.

4 August 2018	Terrassa	2–1	Cornellà	Terrassa
20:00	Goldar 22' (o.g.); Carreón 32'	Diari de Terrassa	89' Pere	Stadium: Olímpic; Attendance: 420; Referee: Gonzalo Romero Freixas

4 August 2018	FE Grama	0–1	Horta	Santa Coloma de Gramenet
20:00		Betevé	61' Nolla	Stadium: Nou Municipal

4 August 2018	Ascó	1–2	Lleida Esportiu	Ascó
19:30	Peke 50'	Lleida Esportiu	36' Juanto; 86' Oriol	Stadium: Municipal; Referee: Moreno Villaécija

5 August 2018	Vilafranca	1–0	Hospitalet	Vilafranca del Penedès
19:30	Vergés 70' (o.g.)	RTV Vilafranca		Stadium: Municipal

8 August 2018	Sant Andreu	3–1	Cerdanyola	Barcelona
20:00	Dani Martí 25' (o.g.); Kuku 53'; Villar 59'	Cerdanyola FC	20' Uri	Stadium: Narcís Sala; Referee: Víctor Manuel Sánchez Rico

8 August 2018	Sants	0–1	Espanyol B	Barcelona
20:00		Betevé	84' Brugué	Stadium: La Magòria

12 August 2018	Granollers	1–0	Badalona	Granollers
19:30	Kilian 83'	L'Esportiu		Stadium: Carrer Girona; Referee: Muñoz Baquero

=== Third round ===
Matches were played on 11 August 2018.

- Bye: Granollers

11 August 2018	Horta	1–1 (4–5 p)	Sant Andreu	Barcelona
20:00 CEST	Tacón 66'	Betevé	43' Jutglà; (yellow card) (yellow-red card) Llamas	Stadium: Feliu i Codina

11 August 2018	Terrassa	0–1	Espanyol B	Terrassa
20:00 CEST		Betevé	83' Alberto Fernández	Stadium: Olímpic

11 August 2018	Vilafranca	0–0 (9–8 p)	Lleida Esportiu	Vilafranca del Penedès
20:00 CEST		FC Vilafranca		Stadium: Municipal

=== Fourth round ===
Matches were played on 7 November 2018. One of the teams qualified from the third round received a bye and goes straight to the semifinals. In this round, the Segunda División teams, Barcelona B, Gimnàstic and Reus, enter the competition.

- Bye: Gimnàstic

7 November 2018	Espanyol B	1–0	Reus	Sant Adrià de Besòs
19:00 CEST				Stadium: Ciutat Esportiva Dani Jarque

7 November 2018	Granollers	1–1 (1–4 p)	Vilafranca	Granollers
19:30 CEST				Stadium: Municipal

7 November 2018	Sant Andreu	1–0	Barcelona B	Barcelona
20:00 CEST				Stadium: Narcís Sala

=== Semifinals ===
Matches will be played on 21 November 2018.

21 November 2018	Espanyol B	2–2 (4–5 p)	Sant Andreu	Sant Adrià de Besòs
18:00				Stadium: Ciutat Esportiva Dani Jarque

21 November 2018	Vilafranca	0–0 (3–0 p)	Gimnàstic	Vilafranca del Penedès
19:45				Stadium: Municipal

=== Final ===
1 May 2019
18:00

Vilafranca	0–2	Sant Andreu
	Report	Jutglà 14'; David López 81'

La Feixa Llarga, L'Hospitalet de Llobregat
Attendance: 2,623
Referee: Albert Català

Vilafranca:
1	(Spain) Iván León
2	(Spain) Óscar Sierra	(substituted off) 61'
3	(Spain) Sergi Escofet	(substituted off) 76'
4	(Spain) David Fontanils
6	(Spain) Josep Díez	(substituted off) 83'
7	(Spain) Gerard Boira
8	(Spain) Víctor Oribe	(yellow card) 63'
9	(Spain) Ignacio Rosillo	(substituted off) 71'
11	(Spain) Ramón Gutiérrez	(substituted off) 61'
20	(Spain) Eric Via	(yellow card) 44'
23	(Spain) Antonio Pelegrín	(yellow card) 58'
Substitutes:
13	(Spain) Miguel Ramos
10	(Spain) Sergi Gestí	(substituted in) 61'
14	(Spain) Josep Mateu	(substituted in) 61'	(substituted off) 76'
15	(Germany) Luca Tremiño	(substituted in) 76'
16	(Spain) Josep Sardà	(yellow card) 80'	(substituted in) 76'
17	(Spain) Marc Vadillo
18	(Spain) Jaume Batista	(substituted in) 83'
21	(Spain) Adrián Balboa	(substituted in) 71'
22	(Guinea-Bissau) Braima Fati
Manager:
(Spain) Iván Moreno

Sant Andreu:
13	(Spain) José Segovia
2	(Spain) José Antonio Llamas
3	(Spain) Jaume Villar		(substituted off) 90'
5	(Spain) Joan Noguera	(yellow card) 40'
7	(Spain) David López
9	(Spain) Óscar Muñoz	(yellow card) 69'	(substituted off) 74'
10	(Spain) Ton Alcover		(substituted off) 65'
17	(Spain) Ferran Jutglà		(substituted off) 77'
20	(Brazil) Felipe Sá		(substituted off) 85'
21	(Spain) Alberto Rodríguez		(substituted off) 63'
22	(Spain) Josué Rodríguez
Substitutes:
1	(Spain) Iván Fuentes
4	(Spain) Juanma Miranda	(yellow card) 65'	(substituted in) 63'
8	(Spain) Dani Guerrero	(yellow card) 88'	(substituted in) 85'
11	(Spain) Juanan Gallego
14	(Spain) Mamadou Kanteh
18	(Spain) Sergi García		(substituted in) 65'
19	(Spain) Carlos Martínez	(yellow card) 89'	(substituted in) 74'
23	(Brazil) Wanderson de Souza		(substituted in) 90'
25	(Spain) Guillem Escarrabill		(substituted in) 77'
Manager:
(Spain) Mikel Azparren
