= 2018–19 Atlético Madrid season =

88th season in existence of Atlético Madrid

Atlético Madrid
2018–19 season
- President: Enrique Cerezo
- Head coach: Diego Simeone
- Stadium: Wanda Metropolitano
- La Liga: 2nd
- Copa del Rey: Round of 16
- UEFA Champions League: Round of 16
- UEFA Super Cup: Winners
- Top goalscorer: League: Antoine Griezmann (15); All: Antoine Griezmann (21)
- Highest home attendance: 67,804 (vs Real Madrid)
- Lowest home attendance: 31,414 (vs Sant Andreu)
Home colours	Away colours	Third colours

The 2018–19 season was Atlético Madrid's 88th season since foundation in 1903 and the club's 82nd season in La Liga, the top league of Spanish football. Atlético competed in La Liga, Copa del Rey, UEFA Champions League and UEFA Super Cup.

The season was the first since 2014–15 without the club's legend striker Fernando Torres who joined Japanese club Sagan Tosu (although he returned with the colchoneros in January 2015) and 2010–11 without Gabi, who departed to Al-Sadd SC in the summer of 2018.

== Kits ==
Home	Home (alt. 1)	Away	Away (alt. 1)	Third	Third (alt. 1)	Third (alt. 2)	Third (alt. 3)	Third (alt. 4)

Goalkeeper 1	Goalkeeper 2	Goalkeeper 3

== Players ==
N	Pos.	Nat.	Name	Age	EU	Since	App	Goals	Ends	Transfer fee	Notes
1	GK	(Spain)	Antonio Adán	32	EU	2018	0	0	2020	€1M	
2	DF	(Uruguay)	Diego Godín (captain)	33	EU	2010	350	23	2019	€8M	Second nationality: (Spain)
3	DF	(Brazil)	Filipe Luís	33	EU	2010–2014; 2015	301	10	2019	€16M	Second nationality: (Italy)
4	DF	(Colombia)	Santiago Arias	27	Non-EU	2018	0	0	2023		
5	MF	(Ghana)	Thomas Partey	26	Non-EU	2013	97	9	2023	Academy	
6	MF	(Spain)	Koke	27	EU	2009	374	34	2024	Academy	
7	FW	(France)	Antoine Griezmann	28	EU	2014	209	112	2023	€30M	
8	MF	(Spain)	Saúl	24	EU	2012	204	28	2026	Academy	
9	FW	(Croatia)	Nikola Kalinić	31	EU	2018	0	0	2021		
10	FW	(Argentina)	Ángel Correa	24	EU	2014	139	25	2024	€7.5M	Second nationality: (Spain)
11	MF	(France)	Thomas Lemar	23	EU	2018	0	0		€60M	
13	GK	(Slovenia)	Jan Oblak	26	EU	2014	162	0	2021	€16M	
14	MF	(Spain)	Rodri	23	EU	2018	0	0	2023	€20M	
15	DF	(Montenegro)	Stefan Savić	28	Non-EU	2015	110	1	2020	€25M	
18	DF	(Argentina)	Nehuén Pérez	19	Non-EU	2018	0	0	2024		
19	FW	(Spain)	Diego Costa	30	EU	2007–2009; 2010–2014; 2018	158	71	2022	€65M	Second nationality: (Brazil)
20	DF	(Spain)	Juanfran	34	EU	2011	325	6	2019	€4.25M	
21	DF	(France)	Lucas Hernandez	23	EU	2014	88	0	2024	Academy	Second nationality: (Spain)
22	FW	(Spain)	Álvaro Morata	26	EU	2019	0	0	2020		Loan
23	MF	(Spain)	Vitolo	29	EU	2017	23	3	2022	€35.7M	
24	DF	(Uruguay)	José Giménez	24	EU	2013	134	6	2023	€0.9M	Second nationality: (Spain)

- Ordered by squad number.

== Transfers ==
=== In ===
No.	Pos.	Nat.	Name	Age	EU	Moving from	Type	Transfer window	Ends	Transfer fee	Source
–	GK	(Portugal)	André Moreira	22	EU	(Portugal) Belenenses	Loan return	Summer		Free	
–	DF	(Uruguay)	Emiliano Velázquez	24	Non-EU	Rayo Vallecano	Loan return	Summer		Free	
–	MF	(Portugal)	Diogo Jota	21	EU	(England) Wolverhampton Wanderers	Loan return	Summer		Free	
–	MF	(Cameroon)	Pierre Kunde	22	Non-EU	Granada	Loan return	Summer		Free	
–	MF	(Ghana)	Bernard Mensah	23	Non-EU	(Turkey) Kasımpaşa	Loan return	Summer		Free	
–	FW	(Spain)	Héctor	22	EU	Albacete	Loan return	Summer		Free	
17	FW	(Argentina)	Luciano Vietto	24	EU	Valencia	Loan return	Summer		Free	
14	MF	(Spain)	Rodri	22	EU	Villarreal	Transfer	Summer		€20M	Atletico.com
11	MF	(France)	Thomas Lemar	22	EU	(France) Monaco	Transfer	Summer		€60M	
–	DF	(Argentina)	Nehuén Pérez	18	Non-EU	(Argentina) Argentinos Juniors	Transfer	Summer		Undisclosed	Atletico.com
1	GK	(Spain)	Antonio Adán	31	EU	Real Betis	Transfer	Summer		€1M	Atletico.com
18	MF	(Portugal)	Gelson Martins	23	EU	(Portugal) Sporting CP	Transfer	Summer		Free	Atletico.com
–	DF	(Spain)	Jonny	24	EU	Celta Vigo	Transfer	Summer		€7M	Atletico.com
4	DF	(Colombia)	Santiago Arias	26	Non-EU	(Netherlands) PSV Eindhoven	Transfer	Summer		Undisclosed	Atletico.com
9	FW	(Croatia)	Nikola Kalinić	30	EU	(Italy) Milan	Transfer	Summer		Undisclosed	Atletico.com
–	GK	(Portugal)	André Moreira	23	EU	(England) Aston Villa	Loan return	Winter		Free	
22	FW	(Spain)	Álvaro Morata	26	EU	(England) Chelsea	Loan	Winter		Undisclosed	Atletico.com
–	DF	(Spain)	Jonny	24	EU	(England) Wolverhampton Wanderers	Loan return	Winter		Free	
–	DF	(Argentina)	Nehuén Pérez	18	Non-EU	(Argentina) Argentinos Juniors	Loan return	Winter		Free	Atletico.com
–	DF	(Spain)	Héctor	24	EU	Málaga	Loan return	Winter		Free	
–	GK	(Argentina)	Axel Werner	22	Non-EU	Huesca	Loan return	Winter		Free	

=== Out ===
No.	Pos.	Nat.	Name	Age	EU	Moving to	Type	Transfer window	Transfer fee	Source
–	MF	(Portugal)	Diogo Jota	21	EU	(England) Wolverhampton Wanderers	Transfer	Summer	£12.6M	Wolves.co.uk
9	FW	(Spain)	Fernando Torres	34	EU	(Japan) Sagan Tosu	End of contract	Summer	Free	Atlético.com
14	MF	(Spain)	Gabi	34	EU	(Qatar) Al Sadd	Transfer	Summer	Undisclosed	al-saddclub.com
–	MF	(Ghana)	Bernard Mensah	23	Non-EU	(Turkey) Kayserispor	Loan	Summer	Free	Atlético.com
–	MF	(Cameroon)	Pierre Kunde	22	Non-EU	(Germany) Mainz 05	Transfer	Summer	Undisclosed	mainz05.de
25	GK	(Argentina)	Axel Werner	22	Non-EU	Huesca	Loan	Summer	Free	Atlético.com
–	DF	(Argentina)	Nehuén Pérez	18	Non-EU	(Argentina) Argentinos Juniors	Loan	Summer	Free	
–	DF	(Uruguay)	Emiliano Velázquez	24	Non-EU	Rayo Vallecano	Transfer	Summer	Undisclosed	Atlético.com
–	DF	(Spain)	Jonny	24	EU	(England) Wolverhampton Wanderers	Loan	Summer	Free	Atletico.com
16	DF	(Croatia)	Šime Vrsaljko	26	EU	(Italy) Internazionale	Loan	Summer	Free	Atletico.com
–	GK	(Portugal)	André Moreira	22	EU	(England) Aston Villa	Loan	Summer	Free	Atletico.com
–	FW	(Spain)	Héctor	22	EU	Málaga	Loan	Summer	Free	malagacf.com
17	FW	(Argentina)	Luciano Vietto	24	EU	(England) Fulham	Loan	Summer	Free	Atletico.com
–	FW	(France)	Kevin Gameiro	31	EU	Valencia	Transfer	Summer	Undisclosed	valenciacf.com
–	MF	(Senegal)	Arona Sané	23	EU	(Croatia) Istra 1961	Transfer	Summer	Free	
–	DF	(Spain)	Sergi González	23	EU	Ararat-Armenia	Transfer	Summer	Free	
–	GK	(Portugal)	André Moreira	23	EU	(Portugal) Feirense	Loan	Winter	Free	cdfeirense.pt
18	FW	(Portugal)	Gelson Martins	23	EU	(France) Monaco	Loan	Winter	Free	Atletico.com
–	DF	(Spain)	Jonny	23	EU	(England) Wolverhampton Wanderers	Transfer	Winter	Undisclosed	Atletico.com
–	FW	(Spain)	Héctor	23	EU	Rayo Majadahonda	Loan	Winter	Free	rayomajadahonda.es
–	GK	(Argentina)	Axel Werner	22	Non-EU	Málaga	Loan	Winter	Free	malagacf.com

== Pre-season and friendlies ==
Win Draw Loss Fixtures

26 July 2018 1	Atlético Madrid	1–1 (3–1 p)	Arsenal	Kallang, Singapore
13:35 CEST (UTC+2)	Vietto 41'	Report	Smith Rowe 47'; Chambers (yellow card) 80'	Stadium: National Stadium; Attendance: 23,095; Referee: Ahmad A'Qashah (Singapore)
	Penalties
	Correa (penalty missed); Rodri (penalty scored); Garcés (penalty missed); Mollejo (penalty scored); Adán (penalty scored)		(penalty missed) Mkhitaryan; (penalty missed) Willock; (penalty scored) Maitland-Niles; (penalty missed) Nketiah

30 July 2018 2	Paris Saint-Germain	3–2	Atlético Madrid	Kallang, Singapore
13:35 CEST (UTC+2)	Nkunku 32'; Diaby 71'; Sissako (yellow card) 74'; Postolachi 90+2'	Report	Mollejo 75'; Bernede 86' (o.g.)	Stadium: National Stadium; Attendance: 50,038; Referee: Muhammad Taqi Aljaafari Bin Jahari (Singapore)

5 August 2018 3	VfB Stuttgart	1–1	Atlético Madrid	Stuttgart, Germany
17:00 CEST (UTC+2)	Didavi 59' (pen.)	Report	Muñoz 60'	Stadium: Mercedes-Benz Arena

8 August 2018 4	Cagliari	0–1	Atlético Madrid	Cagliari, Italy
20:00 CEST (UTC+2)		Report	Borja 32'	Stadium: Sardegna Arena

11 August 2018 5	Atlético Madrid	0–1	Internazionale	Madrid, Spain
20:00 CEST (UTC+2)	Costa (yellow card) 24'	Report	Martínez 31', (yellow card) 62'	Stadium: Wanda Metropolitano; Attendance: 23,427; Referee: Alejandro Hernández Hernández (Spain)

21 May 2019 6	Beitar Jerusalem	2–1	Atlético Madrid	Jerusalem, Israel
18:30 CEST (UTC+02:00)	Buzaglo 14', 58'; Ben Haim (yellow card) 19'; Voduț (yellow card) 71'	Report	Griezmann 49' (pen.); Vitolo (yellow card) 52'	Stadium: Teddy Stadium; Attendance: 30,427; Referee: Liran Liani (Israel)

== Competitions ==
=== Overview ===
Competition	First match	Last match	Starting round	Final position	Record							
Competition	First match	Last match	Starting round	Final position	Pld	W	D	L	GF	GA	GD	Win %
La Liga	20 August 2018	19 May 2019	Matchday 1	2nd	38	22	10	6	55	29	+26	57.89
Copa del Rey	30 October 2018	16 January 2019	Round of 32	Round of 16	4	2	2	0	9	4	+5	50.00
Champions League	18 September 2018	12 March 2019	Group stage	Round of 16	8	5	1	2	11	9	+2	62.50
UEFA Super Cup	15 August 2018	15 August 2018	Final	Winners	1	1	0	0	4	2	+2	100.00
Total					51	30	13	8	79	44	+35	58.82

Last updated: 18 May 2019
Source: Competitions

=== La Liga ===
==== League table ====
Pos	Team	Pld	W	D	L	GF	GA	GD	Pts	Qualification or relegation
1	Barcelona (C)	38	26	9	3	90	36	+54	87	Qualification for the Champions League group stage
2	Atlético Madrid	38	22	10	6	55	29	+26	76	Qualification for the Champions League group stage
3	Real Madrid	38	21	5	12	63	46	+17	68	Qualification for the Champions League group stage
4	Valencia	38	15	16	7	51	35	+16	61	Qualification for the Champions League group stage
5	Getafe	38	15	14	9	48	35	+13	59 (Note: Getafe finished ahead of Sevilla on head-to-head points: Sevilla 0–2 Getafe, Getafe 3–0 Sevilla.)	Qualification for the Europa League group stage (Note: Since the winners of the 2018–19 Copa del Rey, Valencia, qualified for European competition based on league position, the spot awarded to the cup winners (Europa League group stage) was passed to the sixth-placed team and the spot awarded to the sixth-placed team (Europa League second qualifying round) was passed to the seventh-placed team.)

Source: La Liga, Soccerway
Rules for classification: 1) Points; 2) Head-to-head points; 3) Head-to-head goal difference; 4) Goal difference; 5) Goals scored; 6) Fair-play points (Note: Head-to-head record is used only after all the matches between the teams in question have been played)
(C) Champions

==== Results summary ====
Overall								Home						Away					
Pld	W	D	L	GF	GA	GD	Pts	W	D	L	GF	GA	GD	W	D	L	GF	GA	GD
38	22	10	6	55	29	+26	76	15	3	1	32	10	+22	7	7	5	23	19	+4

Last updated: 18 May 2019.
Source: Competitive matches

==== Results by round ====
Round	1	2	3	4	5	6	7	8	9	10	11	12	13	14	15	16	17	18	19	20	21	22	23	24	25	26	27	28	29	30	31	32	33	34	35	36	37	38
Ground	A	H	A	H	A	H	A	H	A	H	A	H	H	A	H	A	H	A	H	A	H	A	H	A	H	A	H	A	A	H	A	H	A	H	H	A	H	A
Result	D	W	L	D	W	W	D	W	D	W	D	W	D	D	W	W	W	D	W	W	W	L	L	W	W	W	W	L	W	W	L	W	W	W	W	L	D	D
Position	8	9	10	9	5	3	4	3	5	4	4	3	3	3	3	3	2	2	2	2	2	2	3	2	2	2	2	2	2	2	2	2	2	2	2	2	2	2

Updated to match(es) played on 18 May 2019. Source: Competitive matches
A = Away; H = Home; W = Win; D = Draw; L = Loss

==== Matches ====
Win Draw Loss Fixtures

20 August 2018 1	Valencia	1–1	Atlético Madrid	Valencia
20:00 CEST (UTC+02:00)	Garay (yellow card) 45'; Rodrigo 56', (yellow card) 70'	Report	Savić (yellow card) 13'; Correa 26'; Juanfran (yellow card) 52'; Filipe Luís (yellow card) 63'	Stadium: Mestalla; Attendance: 46,241; Referee: Jesús Gil Manzano

25 August 2018 2	Atlético Madrid	1–0	Rayo Vallecano	Madrid
20:15 CEST (UTC+02:00)	Griezmann 63'; Koke (yellow card) 88'	Report	García (yellow card) 29'	Stadium: Wanda Metropolitano; Attendance: 52,568; Referee: González González

1 September 2018 3	Celta Vigo	2–0	Atlético Madrid	Vigo
18:30 CEST (UTC+02:00)	Lobotka (yellow card) 41'; Gómez 46'; Alonso (yellow card) 48'; Aspas 52'; Yokuşlu (yellow card) 74'; Mallo (yellow card) 76'	Report	Saúl (yellow card) 17'; Partey (yellow card) 28'; Savić (yellow card) 51' (yellow-red card) 70'; Costa (yellow card) 57'	Stadium: Balaídos; Attendance: 19,262; Referee: Antonio Mateu Lahoz

15 September 2018 4	Atlético Madrid	1–1	Eibar	Madrid
13:00 CEST (UTC+02:00)	Koke (yellow card) 39'; Godín (yellow card) 51'; Garcés 90+4'	Report	Charles (yellow card) 16'; Diop (yellow card) 54'; Enrich 87'	Stadium: Wanda Metropolitano; Attendance: 55,745; Referee: Juan Martínez Munuera

23 September 2018 5	Getafe	0–2	Atlético Madrid	Getafe
18:30 CEST (UTC+02:00)	Suárez (yellow card) 56'; Alejo (red card) 67'	Report	Soria 14' (o.g.); Lemar 60'; Saúl (yellow card) 82'; Juanfran (yellow card) 84'	Stadium: Coliseum Alfonso Pérez; Attendance: 12,458; Referee: José María Sánchez Martínez

25 September 2018 6	Atlético Madrid	3–0	Huesca	Madrid
22:00 CEST (UTC+02:00)	Griezmann 16'; Partey 29'; Koke 33'	Report	Semedo (yellow card) 45'; Musto (yellow card) 67'	Stadium: Wanda Metropolitano; Attendance: 47,109; Referee: Pablo González Fuertes

29 September 2018 7	Real Madrid	0–0	Atlético Madrid	Madrid
20:45 CEST (UTC+02:00)	Carvajal (yellow card) 30'; Ramos (yellow card) 61'; Nacho (yellow card) 90+2'	Report	Juanfran (yellow card) 48'; Lemar (yellow card) 59'; Koke (yellow card) 70'; Correa (yellow card) 90+3'	Stadium: Santiago Bernabéu Stadium; Attendance: 78,562; Referee: Juan Martínez Munuera

7 October 2018 8	Atlético Madrid	1–0	Real Betis	Madrid
16:15 CEST (UTC+02:00)	Juanfran (yellow card) 47'; Godín (yellow card) 58'; Correa 74'; Filipe Luís (yellow card) 77'; Saúl (yellow card) 78'; Hernandez (yellow card) 88'	Report	Junior (yellow card) 41'; Bartra (yellow card) 85'; Loren (yellow card) 90+3'	Stadium: Wanda Metropolitano; Attendance: 63,719; Referee: Alberto Undiano Mallenco

20 October 2018 9	Villarreal	1–1	Atlético Madrid	Villarreal
18:30 CEST (UTC+02:00)	Iturra (yellow card) 31'; Álvaro (yellow card) 44'; Mario Gaspar 65'; Pedraza (yellow card) 68'	Report	Juanfran (yellow card) 28'; Filipe Luís 51'	Stadium: Estadio de la Cerámica; Attendance: 17,273; Referee: Xavier Estrada Fernández

27 October 2018 10	Atlético Madrid	2–0	Real Sociedad	Madrid
20:45 CEST (UTC+02:00)	Godín 45'; Koke (yellow card) 77'; Savić (yellow card) 78'; Filipe Luís 88'	Report	Zubeldia (yellow card) 44'	Stadium: Wanda Metropolitano; Attendance: 57,497; Referee: Antonio Mateu Lahoz

3 November 2018 11	Leganés	1–1	Atlético Madrid	Leganés
13:00 CET (UTC+01:00)	En-Nesyri (yellow card) 13'; Silva (yellow card) 53'; Carrillo 82'; Cuéllar (yellow card) 85'; Santos (yellow card) 90+3'	Report	Hernandez (yellow card) 29'; Griezmann 69'; Kalinić (yellow card) 90'	Stadium: Estadio Municipal de Butarque; Attendance: 11,157; Referee: Mario Melero López

11 November 2018 12	Atlético Madrid	3–2	Athletic Bilbao	Madrid
18:30 CET (UTC+01:00)	Costa (yellow card) 38'; Partey 61'; Kalinić (yellow card) 66'; Adán (yellow card) 66'; Vitolo (yellow card) 66'; Rodri 80'; Godín 90+1'; Correa (yellow card) 90+2'	Report	Williams 36', 64'; Beñat (yellow card) 49'; San José (yellow card) 82'; De Marcos (yellow card) 86'; Martínez (yellow card) 90+4'	Stadium: Wanda Metropolitano; Attendance: 59,029; Referee: José María Sánchez Martínez

24 November 2018 13	Atlético Madrid	1–1	Barcelona	Madrid
20:45 CET (UTC+01:00)	Hernandez (yellow card) 39'; Griezmann (yellow card) 48'; Costa (yellow card) 71', (goal) 77'; Rodri (yellow card) 86'; Filipe Luís (yellow card) 87'	Report	Busquets (yellow card) 29'; Umtiti (yellow card) 71'; Dembélé 90'; Rafinha (yellow card) 90+3'	Stadium: Wanda Metropolitano; Attendance: 66,908; Referee: Jesús Gil Manzano

2 December 2018 14	Girona	1–1	Atlético Madrid	Girona
16:15 CET (UTC+01:00)	Stuani 45' (pen.)	Report	Griezmann (yellow card) 17'; Koke (yellow card) 41'; Partey (yellow card) 72'; Ramalho 82' (o.g.); Saúl (yellow card) 89'; Costa (yellow card) 89'	Stadium: Estadi Montilivi; Attendance: 12,104; Referee: Ricardo de Burgos Bengoetxea

8 December 2018 15	Atlético Madrid	3–0	Alavés	Madrid
13:00 CET (UTC+01:00)	Kalinić (yellow card) 5', (goal) 25'; Correa (yellow card) 22'; Arias (yellow card) 58'; Partey (yellow card) 79'; Griezmann 82'; Rodri 87'; Montero (yellow card) 90+1'	Report	Calleri (yellow card) 15'; Tomás Pina (yellow card) 16'; Ximo (yellow card) 37'; Laguardia (yellow card) 90+2'	Stadium: Wanda Metropolitano; Attendance: 55,810; Referee: Alejandro Hernández Hernández

15 December 2018 16	Valladolid	2–3	Atlético Madrid	Valladolid
16:15 CET (UTC+01:00)	Plano (yellow card) 23'; Toni (yellow card) 27'; Kiko (yellow card) 45'; Calero 57'; Saúl 63' (o.g.); Alcaraz (yellow card) 90+1'	Report	Kalinić 26'; Griezmann 45+1' (pen.), 80'; Koke (yellow card) 78'	Stadium: Estadio José Zorrilla; Attendance: 22,585; Referee: Alberto Undiano Mallenco

22 December 2018 17	Atlético Madrid	1–0	Espanyol	Madrid
16:15 CET (UTC+01:00)	Griezmann 56' (pen.); Oblak (yellow card) 85'	Report	Granero (yellow card) 88'	Stadium: Wanda Metropolitano; Attendance: 57,637; Referee: Mario Melero López

6 January 2019 18	Sevilla	1–1	Atlético Madrid	Seville
16:15 CET (UTC+01:00)	Ben Yedder 37'; Navas (yellow card) 45'; Sarabia (yellow card) 47'; Banega (yellow card) 72'; Silva (yellow card) 90+2'; Carriço (yellow card) 90+4'	Report	Correa (yellow card) 14'; Griezmann 45', (yellow card) 54'; Saúl (yellow card) 49'; Rodri (yellow card) 77'; Godín (yellow card) 78'; Partey (yellow card) 90+1'; Savić (yellow card) 90+2'	Stadium: Ramón Sánchez Pizjuán Stadium; Attendance: 38,603; Referee: Antonio Mateu Lahoz

13 January 2019 19	Atlético Madrid	1–0	Levante	Madrid
12:00 CET (UTC+01:00)	Griezmann 57' (pen.)	Report	Jason (yellow card) 42'; Cabaco (yellow card) 85'; Campaña (yellow card) 90+4'	Stadium: Wanda Metropolitano; Attendance: 55,959; Referee: Eduardo Prieto Iglesias

19 January 2019 20	Huesca	0–3	Atlético Madrid	Huesca
18:30 CET (UTC+01:00)	Etxeita (yellow card) 24'; Gallego (yellow card) 68'	Report	Hernandez 31'; Arias 52'; Giménez (yellow card) 62'; Correa (yellow card) 64'; Koke 71'	Stadium: Estadio El Alcoraz; Attendance: 7,107; Referee: Guillermo Cuadra Fernández

26 January 2019 21	Atlético Madrid	2–0	Getafe	Madrid
16:15 CET (UTC+01:00)	Griezmann 27'; Saúl 37'; Arias (yellow card) 48'; Rodri (yellow card) 76'	Report	Djené (yellow card) 34' (yellow-red card) 88'; Ángel (yellow card) 47'; Cristóforo (yellow card) 71'; Cabrera (yellow card) 83' (yellow-red card) 90+1'; Sáiz (yellow card) 90'	Stadium: Wanda Metropolitano; Attendance: 55,571; Referee: Ignacio Iglesias Villanueva

3 February 2019 22	Real Betis	1–0	Atlético Madrid	Seville
16:15 CET (UTC+01:00)	Canales 65' (pen.); Mandi (yellow card) 82'; Firpo (yellow card) 83'; Sergio León (yellow card) 85'; Pau López (yellow card) 87'	Report	Arias (yellow card) 40'; Correa (yellow card) 41'; Hernandez (yellow card) 51'	Stadium: Estadio Benito Villamarín; Attendance: 50,864; Referee: David Medié Jiménez

9 February 2019 23	Atlético Madrid	1–3	Real Madrid	Madrid
16:15 CET (UTC+01:00)	Griezmann (yellow card) 24', (goal) 25'; Giménez (yellow card) 41'; Hernandez (yellow card) 58'; Partey (yellow card) 62' (yellow-red card) 80'; Morata (yellow card) 68'; Saúl (yellow card) 72'	Report	Casemiro 16'; Vázquez (yellow card) 22'; Ramos 42' (pen.); Reguilón (yellow card) 64'; Modrić (yellow card) 66'; Bale 74'	Stadium: Wanda Metropolitano; Attendance: 67,804; Referee: Xavier Estrada Fernández

16 February 2019 24	Rayo Vallecano	0–1	Atlético Madrid	Madrid
16:15 CET (UTC+01:00)		Report	Griezmann 74'; Giménez (yellow card) 90+2'	Stadium: Campo de Fútbol de Vallecas; Attendance: 13,880; Referee: Jesús Gil Manzano

24 February 2019 25	Atlético Madrid	2–0	Villarreal	Madrid
16:15 CET (UTC+01:00)	Morata 31'; Saúl 88'	Report	Álvaro (yellow card) 66'; Cáseres (yellow card) 70'; Ruiz (yellow card) 79'	Stadium: Wanda Metropolitano; Attendance: 59,114; Referee: Alberto Undiano Mallenco

3 March 2019 26	Real Sociedad	0–2	Atlético Madrid	San Sebastián
18:30 CET (UTC+01:00)	Zaldúa (yellow card) 3'	Report	Morata 30', 33'; Koke (yellow card) 41' (yellow-red card) 62'; Rodri (yellow card) 59'; Godín (yellow card) 63'	Stadium: Anoeta Stadium; Attendance: 26,004; Referee: José Luis González González

9 March 2019 27	Atlético Madrid	1–0	Leganés	Madrid
16:15 CET (UTC+01:00)	Giménez (yellow card) 14'; Saúl 50'; Lemar (yellow card) 53'	Report	Braithwaite (yellow card) 15'; Pérez (yellow card) 65'	Stadium: Wanda Metropolitano; Attendance: 58,321; Referee: Antonio Mateu Lahoz

16 March 2019 28	Athletic Bilbao	2–0	Atlético Madrid	Bilbao
18:30 CET (UTC+01:00)	Raúl García (yellow card) 37'; Williams 73'; San José (yellow card) 77'; Yeray (yellow card) 82'; Kodro 85'	Report	Rodri (yellow card) 45'	Stadium: San Mamés Stadium; Attendance: 39,659; Referee: Santiago Jaime Latre

30 March 2019 29	Alavés	0–4	Atlético Madrid	Vitoria-Gasteiz
20:45 CET (UTC+01:00)	Pina (yellow card) 50'; García (yellow card) 56'	Report	Saúl 5'; Costa 11'; Lemar (yellow card) 55'; Morata 59'; Partey 84'; Juanfran (yellow card) 88'	Stadium: Mendizorrotza Stadium; Attendance: 16,665; Referee: Mario Melero López

2 April 2019 30	Atlético Madrid	2–0	Girona	Madrid
19:30 CEST (UTC+02:00)	Arias (yellow card) 48'; Godín 76'; Griezmann 90+4'	Report		Stadium: Wanda Metropolitano; Attendance: 40,863; Referee: Ignacio Iglesias Villanueva

6 April 2019 31	Barcelona	2–0	Atlético Madrid	Barcelona
20:45 CEST (UTC+02:00)	Piqué (yellow card) 74'; Lenglet (yellow card) 78'; Suárez 85', (yellow card) 86'; Messi 87'	Report	Partey (yellow card) 27'; Giménez (yellow card) 28'; Costa (red card) 28'; Godín (yellow card) 29'; Saúl (yellow card) 71'	Stadium: Camp Nou; Attendance: 90,774; Referee: Jesús Gil Manzano

13 April 2019 32	Atlético Madrid	2–0	Celta Vigo	Madrid
18:30 CEST (UTC+02:00)	Griezmann 42', (yellow card) 68'; Juanfran (yellow card) 56'; Morata 74'	Report	Boudebouz (yellow card) 37'; Olaza (yellow card) 87'	Stadium: Wanda Metropolitano; Attendance: 55,090; Referee: Ricardo de Burgos Bengoetxea

20 April 2019 33	Eibar	0–1	Atlético Madrid	Eibar
16:15 CEST (UTC+02:00)	Jordán (yellow card) 45'; José Ángel (yellow card) 62'; Enrich (yellow card) 69'	Report	Lemar 85'; Morata (yellow card) 90+1'	Stadium: Ipurua Municipal Stadium; Attendance: 4,725; Referee: Javier Alberola Rojas

24 April 2019 34	Atlético Madrid	3–2	Valencia	Madrid
19:30 CEST (UTC+02:00)	Morata 9', (yellow card) 47'; Griezmann 49'; Filipe Luís (yellow card) 56'; Saúl (yellow card) 76'; Correa 81'	Report	Soler (yellow card) 22'; Gameiro 36'; Sobrino (yellow card) 73'; Parejo 77' (pen.); Diakhaby (yellow card) 90+2'	Stadium: Wanda Metropolitano; Attendance: 43,531; Referee: Alejandro Hernández Hernández

27 April 2019 35	Atlético Madrid	1–0	Valladolid	Madrid
16:15 CEST (UTC+02:00)	Godín (yellow card) 5'; Partey (yellow card) 38'; Joaquín 66' (o.g.); Correa (yellow card) 90+2'; Koke (yellow card) 90+4'	Report	Moyano (yellow card) 1'; Alcaraz (yellow card) 35'	Stadium: Wanda Metropolitano; Attendance: 53,123; Referee: Mario Melero López

4 May 2019 36	Espanyol	3–0	Atlético Madrid	Barcelona
16:15 CEST (UTC+02:00)	Roca (yellow card) 38'; Godín 45' (o.g.); Iglesias 52', 89' (pen.)	Report	Saúl (yellow card) 18'; Morata (yellow card) 59'	Stadium: RCDE Stadium; Attendance: 20,207; Referee: José Luis Munuera Montero

12 May 2019 37	Atlético Madrid	1–1	Sevilla	Madrid
18:30 CEST (UTC+02:00)	Koke 30', (yellow card) 81'; Partey (yellow card) 68'; Morata (yellow card) 72'; Lemar (yellow card) 88'; Saúl (yellow card) 90+2'	Report	Mesa (yellow card) 58'; Sarabia 70'; Vidal (yellow card) 75'; Rog (yellow card) 86'; Navas (yellow card) 90'	Stadium: Wanda Metropolitano; Attendance: 60,234; Referee: Ricardo de Burgos Bengoetxea

18 May 2019 38	Levante	2–2	Atlético Madrid	Valencia
13:00 CEST (UTC+02:00)	Cabaco 6'; Roger 36'	Report	Montero (yellow card) 39'; Correa (red card) 51'; Rodri 68'; Camello 79'	Stadium: Estadi Ciutat de València; Attendance: 20,575; Referee: Ignacio Iglesias Villanueva

=== Copa del Rey ===
==== Round of 32 ====
30 October 2018 First leg	Sant Andreu	0–1	Atlético Madrid	Barcelona
21:30 CET (UTC+01:00)	Felipe Sá (yellow card) 54'; Muñoz (yellow card) 57'	Report	Martins 33'	Stadium: Camp Municipal Narcís Sala; Attendance: 5,995; Referee: Jesús Gil Manzano

5 December 2018 Second leg	Atlético Madrid	4–0 (5–0 agg.)	Sant Andreu	Madrid
19:30 CET (UTC+01:00)	Martins (yellow card) 30'; Lemar 48'; Kalinić 53'; Correa 55'; Koke (yellow card) 76'; Vitolo 81'	Report	Noguera (yellow card) 58'; Carlos Martínez (yellow card) 82'	Stadium: Wanda Metropolitano; Attendance: 31,414; Referee: Mario Melero López

==== Round of 16 ====
9 January 2019 First leg	Girona	1–1	Atlético Madrid	Girona
19:30 CET (UTC+01:00)	Lozano 34'	Report	Griezmann 9'; Montero (yellow card) 27'; Godín (yellow card) 67'	Stadium: Estadi Montilivi; Attendance: 7,770; Referee: Alejandro Hernández Hernández

16 January 2019 Second leg	Atlético Madrid	3–3 (4–4 (a) agg.)	Girona	Madrid
19:30 CET (UTC+01:00)	Kalinić 12'; Correa 66'; Hernandez (yellow card) 69'; Griezmann 84', (yellow card) 85'	Report	Valery 37'; Stuani 59'; Doumbia 88'; Iraizoz (yellow card) 90+2'; Porro (yellow card) 90+3'	Stadium: Wanda Metropolitano; Attendance: 45,221; Referee: Antonio Mateu Lahoz

=== UEFA Champions League ===
==== Group stage ====
Pos	Team	Pld	W	D	L	GF	GA	GD	Pts	Qualification	DOR	ATM	BRU	MON
1	(Germany) Borussia Dortmund	6	4	1	1	10	2	+8	13 (Note: Head-to-head goal difference: Borussia Dortmund +2, Atlético Madrid –2.)	Advance to knockout phase	—	4–0	0–0	3–0
2	(Spain) Atlético Madrid	6	4	1	1	9	6	+3	13	Advance to knockout phase	2–0	—	3–1	2–0
3	(Belgium) Club Brugge	6	1	3	2	6	5	+1	6	Transfer to Europa League	0–1	0–0	—	1–1
4	(France) Monaco	6	0	1	5	2	14	−12	1		0–2	1–2	0–4	—

Source: UEFA
Rules for classification: Group stage tiebreakers
Notes:

18 September 2018 1	Monaco (France)	1–2	(Spain) Atlético Madrid	Monaco
21:00 CEST (UTC+02:00)	Falcao (yellow card) 11'; Grandsir 18'; Sidibé (yellow card) 52'; Traoré (yellow card) 78'	Report	Costa 31', (yellow card) 90+2'; Giménez 45+1', (yellow card) 48'	Stadium: Stade Louis II; Attendance: 10,575; Referee: Willie Collum (Scotland)

3 October 2018 2	Atlético Madrid (Spain)	3–1	(Belgium) Club Brugge	Madrid
21:00 CEST (UTC+02:00)	Griezmann 28', 67'; Giménez (yellow card) 36'; Hernandez (yellow card) 85'; Koke 90+4'	Report	Rits (yellow card) 27'; Danjuma 39'; Openda (yellow card) 81'	Stadium: Wanda Metropolitano; Attendance: 55,742; Referee: Ivan Kružliak (Slovakia)

24 October 2018 3	Borussia Dortmund (Germany)	4–0	(Spain) Atlético Madrid	Dortmund, Germany
21:00 CEST (UTC+02:00)	Diallo (yellow card) 13'; Witsel 38'; Guerreiro 73', 89'; Sancho 83'; Zagadou (yellow card) 90+3'	Report	Partey (yellow card) 35'; Lemar (yellow card) 45+1'; Filipe Luís (yellow card) 82'; Costa (yellow card) 87'; Correa (yellow card) 90+3'	Stadium: Westfalenstadion; Attendance: 66,099; Referee: Anthony Taylor (England)

6 November 2018 4	Atlético Madrid (Spain)	2–0	(Germany) Borussia Dortmund	Madrid
21:00 CET (UTC+01:00)	Correa (yellow card) 6'; Saúl 33'; Griezmann 80'	Report	Sancho (yellow card) 31'; Akanji (yellow card) 90+1'; Reus (yellow card) 90+3'	Stadium: Wanda Metropolitano; Attendance: 61,023; Referee: Daniele Orsato (Italy)

28 November 2018 5	Atlético Madrid (Spain)	2–0	(France) Monaco	Madrid
18:55 CET (UTC+01:00)	Koke 2'; Griezmann 24', (yellow card) 45'; Savić (yellow card) 62' (yellow-red card) 82'; Partey (yellow card) 86'; Filipe Luís (yellow card) 90+1'	Report	Tielemans (yellow card) 54'; Biancone (yellow card) 68'	Stadium: Wanda Metropolitano; Attendance: 56,314; Referee: Mattias Gestranius (Finland)

11 December 2018 6	Club Brugge (Belgium)	0–0	(Spain) Atlético Madrid	Bruges, Belgium
21:00 CET (UTC+01:00)	Denswil (yellow card) 56'; Amrabat (yellow card) 76'	Report	Montero (yellow card) 20'; Saúl (yellow card) 48'; Godín (yellow card) 57'	Stadium: Jan Breydel Stadium; Attendance: 25,645; Referee: Davide Massa (Italy)

==== Knockout phase ====
===== Round of 16 =====
20 February 2019 First leg	Atlético Madrid (Spain)	2–0	(Italy) Juventus	Madrid
21:00 CET (UTC+01:00)	Costa (yellow card) 8'; Partey (yellow card) 45+3'; Giménez 78'; Godín 83'; Griezmann (yellow card) 89'	Report	Alex Sandro (yellow card) 55'	Stadium: Wanda Metropolitano; Attendance: 67,193; Referee: Felix Zwayer (Germany)

12 March 2019 Second leg	Juventus (Italy)	3–0 (3–2 agg.)	(Spain) Atlético Madrid	Turin, Italy
21:00 CET (UTC+01:00)	Ronaldo 27', 48', 86' (pen.); Bernardeschi (yellow card) 64'	Report	Juanfran (yellow card) 73'; Giménez (yellow card) 86'; Vitolo (yellow card) 90+3'	Stadium: Juventus Stadium; Attendance: 40,884; Referee: Björn Kuipers (Netherlands)

=== UEFA Super Cup ===
15 August 2018	Real Madrid (Spain)	2–4 (a.e.t.)	(Spain) Atlético Madrid	Tallinn, Estonia
20:45 CEST (UTC+02:00)	Benzema 27'; Asensio (yellow card) 35'; Marcelo (yellow card) 54'; Ramos 63' (pen.), (yellow card) 112'; Ceballos (yellow card) 90+1'; Modrić (yellow card) 101'	Report	Costa 1', 79', (yellow card) 62'; Correa (yellow card) 60'; Saúl 98'; Koke 104'; Vitolo (yellow card) 105+3'	Stadium: A. Le Coq Arena; Attendance: 12,424; Referee: Szymon Marciniak (Poland)

== Statistics ==
=== Squad statistics ===
As of matches played till 18 May 2019

No.	Pos.	Nat.	Player	Total					La Liga					Copa del Rey					Champions League					UEFA Super Cup				
No.	Pos.	Nat.	Player				Yellow card	Red card				Yellow card	Red card				Yellow card	Red card				Yellow card	Red card				Yellow card	Red card
1	GK	(Spain)	Adán	5	0	0	1	0	1	0	0	1	0	4	0	0	0	0	0	0	0	0	0	0	0	0	0	0
2	DF	(Uruguay)	Godín	37	2	4	8	0	28	2	3	6	0	2	0	0	1	0	6	0	1	1	0	1	0	0	0	0
3	DF	(Brazil)	Filipe Luís	28	4	2	6	0	24	3	2	4	0	0	0	0	0	0	4	1	0	2	0	0	0	0	0	0
4	DF	(Colombia)	Arias	28	5	1	4	0	20	5	1	4	0	4	0	0	0	0	4	0	0	0	0	0	0	0	0	0
5	MF	(Ghana)	Partey	30	12	3	12	1	22	10	3	9	1	2	1	0	0	0	6	0	0	3	0	0	1	0	0	0
6	MF	(Spain)	Koke	40	1	6	11	1	29	1	3	10	1	3	0	0	1	0	7	0	2	0	0	1	0	1	0	0
7	FW	(France)	Griezmann	47	1	21	8	0	37	0	15	5	0	1	1	2	1	0	8	0	4	2	0	1	0	0	0	0
8	MF	(Spain)	Saúl	43	2	6	11	0	32	1	4	10	0	3	0	0	0	0	7	1	1	1	0	1	0	1	0	0
9	FW	(Croatia)	Kalinić	12	12	4	3	0	7	10	2	3	0	4	0	2	0	0	1	2	0	0	0	0	0	0	0	0
10	FW	(Argentina)	Correa	25	24	5	10	1	20	16	3	7	1	2	2	2	0	0	3	5	0	2	0	0	1	0	1	0
11	MF	(France)	Lemar	31	12	3	5	0	22	9	2	4	0	3	1	1	0	0	5	2	0	1	0	1	0	0	0	0
13	GK	(Slovenia)	Oblak	46	0	0	1	0	37	0	0	1	0	0	0	0	0	0	8	0	0	0	0	1	0	0	0	0
14	MF	(Spain)	Rodri	41	6	3	5	0	32	2	3	5	0	2	2	0	0	0	6	2	0	0	0	1	0	0	0	0
15	DF	(Montenegro)	Savić	21	1	0	7	2	17	1	0	5	1	2	0	0	0	0	1	0	0	2	1	1	0	0	0	0
18	MF	(Portugal)	Martins	4	8	1	1	0	1	7	0	0	0	2	0	1	1	0	1	1	0	0	0	0	0	0	0	0
19	FW	(Spain)	Costa	19	2	5	8	1	14	2	2	4	1	0	0	0	0	0	4	0	1	3	0	1	0	2	1	0
20	DF	(Spain)	Juanfran	26	4	0	8	0	18	4	0	7	0	2	0	0	0	0	5	0	0	1	0	1	0	0	0	0
21	DF	(France)	Hernandez	20	2	1	7	0	13	1	1	5	0	1	1	0	1	0	5	0	0	1	0	1	0	0	0	0
22	FW	(Spain)	Morata	14	3	6	5	0	13	2	6	5	0	0	0	0	0	0	1	1	0	0	0	0	0	0	0	0
23	MF	(Spain)	Vitolo	7	21	1	3	0	5	15	0	1	0	2	1	1	0	0	0	4	0	1	0	0	1	0	1	0
24	DF	(Uruguay)	Giménez	26	3	2	8	0	19	2	0	5	0	2	0	0	0	0	5	0	2	3	0	0	1	0	0	0
32	FW	(Spain)	Garcés^{1}	0	1	1	0	0	0	1	1	0	0	0	0	0	0	0	0	0	0	0	0	0	0	0	0	0
33	DF	(Colombia)	Solano^{1}	1	0	0	0	0	1	0	0	0	0	0	0	0	0	0	0	0	0	0	0	0	0	0	0	0
35	DF	(Spain)	Montero^{1}	7	7	0	4	0	4	5	0	2	0	2	1	0	1	0	1	1	0	1	0	0	0	0	0	0
38	FW	(Spain)	C. Isaac^{1}	1	0	0	0	0	1	0	0	0	0	0	0	0	0	0	0	0	0	0	0	0	0	0	0	0
40	MF	(Spain)	Mollejo^{1}	0	4	0	0	0	0	4	0	0	0	0	0	0	0	0	0	0	0	0	0	0	0	0	0	0
43	FW	(Spain)	Moya^{1}	2	0	0	0	0	1	0	0	0	0	1	0	0	0	0	0	0	0	0	0	0	0	0	0	0
47	FW	(Spain)	Muñoz^{1}	0	1	0	0	0	0	1	0	0	0	0	0	0	0	0	0	0	0	0	0	0	0	0	0	0
55	MF	(Spain)	Camello^{1}	0	1	1	0	0	0	1	1	0	0	0	0	0	0	0	0	0	0	0	0	0	0	0	0	0
Own goals				–	–	3	–	–	–	–	3	–	–	–	–	0	–	–	–	–	0	–	–	–	–	0	–	–
Total				–	–	79	136	6	–	–	55	101	5	–	–	9	6	0	–	–	11	24	1	–	–	4	3	0

^{1}Players from reserve team - Atlético Madrid B.

=== Goalscorers ===
As of matches played till 18 May 2019

Rank	No.	Pos.	Player	La Liga	Copa del Rey	Champions League	UEFA Super Cup	Total
1	7	FW	(France) Antoine Griezmann	15	2	4	0	21
2	6	MF	(Spain) Koke	3	0	2	1	6
2	8	MF	(Spain) Saúl	4	0	1	1	6
2	22	FW	(Spain) Álvaro Morata	6	0	0	0	6
5	10	FW	(Argentina) Ángel Correa	3	2	0	0	5
5	19	FW	(Spain) Diego Costa	2	0	1	2	5
7	2	DF	(Uruguay) Diego Godín	3	0	1	0	4
7	9	FW	(Croatia) Nikola Kalinić	2	2	0	0	4
9	5	MF	(Ghana) Thomas Partey	3	0	0	0	3
9	11	MF	(France) Thomas Lemar	2	1	0	0	3
9	14	MF	(Spain) Rodri	3	0	0	0	3
12	3	DF	(Brazil) Filipe Luís	2	0	0	0	2
12	24	DF	(Uruguay) José Giménez	0	0	2	0	2
14	4	DF	(Colombia) Santiago Arias	1	0	0	0	1
14	18	MF	(Portugal) Gelson Martins^{1}	0	1	0	0	1
14	21	DF	(France) Lucas Hernandez	1	0	0	0	1
14	23	MF	(Spain) Vitolo	0	1	0	0	1
14	32	FW	(Spain) Borja Garcés	1	0	0	0	1
14	55	MF	(Spain) Sergio Camello	1	0	0	0	1
Own goals				3	0	0	0	3
TOTAL				55	9	11	4	79

^{1}Player left the club during the season.

=== Clean sheets ===
As of matches played till 18 May 2019

Rank	No.	Pos.	Player	Matches played	Clean sheet %	La Liga (%)	Cup (%)	Champions League (%)	UEFA Super Cup (%)	Total
1	13	GK	(Slovenia) Jan Oblak	46	52%	20 (54%)	0 (0%)	4 (50%)	0 (0%)	24
2	1	GK	(Spain) Antonio Adán	5	40%	0 (0%)	2 (50%)	0 (0%)	0 (0%)	2
TOTALS				51	51%	20 (54%)	2 (50%)	4 (50%)	0 (0%)	26

=== Attendances ===
As of matches played till 12 May 2019

	Matches	Attendances	Average	High	Low
La Liga	19	1,065,632	56,085	67,804	40,863
Copa del Rey	2	76,635	38,317	45,221	31,414
Champions League	4	240,272	60,068	67,193	55,742
Total	25	1,382,539	51,490	67,804	31,414
