= Segovia (disambiguation) =

Segovia is a city in Spain.

Segovia may also refer to:

- Segovia (surname), Spanish surname

== Places ==
- Segovia Province, Spain
- Segovia (Spanish Congress electoral district)
- Segovia River, Honduras
- Segovia (Baetica), ancient Roman city in Hispania Baetica
- Segovia, Antioquia, Colombia
- Segovia, Texas, town in Kimble County, Texas, United States
- Segovia Formation, geologic formation in the United States

== Other uses ==
- 3822 Segovia, asteroid

== See also ==
- Sokovia, a fictional country in the Marvel Cinematic Universe
