= Segovia (surname) =

Segovia is a Spanish surname. Notable people with the surname include:

- Andrés Segovia (1893–1987), Spanish classical guitarist
- Abel Segovia (born 1979), Spanish football midfielder
- Ángela Segovia (born 1987), Spanish poet
- Claudio Segovia (1933–2025), Argentinian theatre director, producer, choreographer, scenic designer, lighting designer, and costume designer
- Darío Segovia (1932–1994), Paraguayan football defender
- Fernando Segovia (born 1948), Cuban-American theologian and professor
- Fernando Visier Segovia (born 1943), Spanish chess player
- Franco Segovia (born 1988), Chilean footballer
- José Segovia (born 1991), Spanish footballer
- Mauricio Segovia (born 1977), Chilean football defender
- Ronald Segovia (born 1985), Bolivian football midfielder
- Telasco Segovia (born 2003), Venezuelan football midfielder
- Tomás Segovia (footballer) (born 1999), Argentine footballer
- Tomás Segovia (poet) (1927–2011), Mexican author, translator and poet
- Zack Segovia (born 1983), American baseball pitcher

== See also ==
- Segovia (disambiguation)
