= 2018 International Champions Cup =

Tournament details
- Host countries: Austria; England; France; Italy; Portugal; Republic of Ireland; Singapore; Spain; United States
- Dates: July 20 – August 11
- Teams: 18 (from 1 confederation)
- Venues: 23 (in 23 host cities)

Final positions
- Champions: (England) Tottenham Hotspur (1st title)

Tournament statistics
- Matches played: 27
- Goals scored: 83 (3.07 per match)
- Attendance: 1,061,520 (39,316 per match)
- Top scorer(s): (Spain) Marco Asensio (France) Alexandre Lacazette (3 goals each)

The 2018 International Champions Cup was the sixth edition of a tournament comprising a series of friendly association football matches. It began on July 20 and ended on August 11. The tournament was won by English club Tottenham Hotspur.

== Teams ==
A total of 18 teams participated in the tournament. The participants were announced in four waves on April 10, 11, 12, and 17, 2018. On June 18, Lyon replaced Sevilla in the competition.

Nation	Team
England	Arsenal
England	Chelsea
England	Liverpool
England	Manchester City
England	Manchester United
England	Tottenham Hotspur
France	Lyon
France	Paris Saint-Germain
Germany	Bayern Munich
Germany	Borussia Dortmund
Italy	Inter Milan
Italy	Juventus
Italy	Milan
Italy	Roma
Portugal	Benfica
Spain	Atlético Madrid
Spain	Barcelona
Spain	Real Madrid

== Venues ==
Originally 22 venues for the International Champions Cup were announced on April 13 and 17, 2018, but they were later increased to 23. Of these, 15 were in the United States, 7 were in Europe, and 1 was in Asia.

After Sevilla had to pull out (replaced by Lyon), matches due to take place in Warsaw and Zürich were canceled and replaced by matches in London and Faro-Loulé. The two matches Chelsea played were relocated from Gothenburg and Solna to Nice and Dublin respectively.

United States

Ann Arbor (Detroit Area)	Pasadena (Los Angeles Area)	East Rutherford (New York City Area)	Landover (Washington, D.C. Area)	Arlington (Dallas-Fort Worth Area)
Michigan Stadium	Rose Bowl	MetLife Stadium	FedExField	AT&T Stadium
Capacity: 107,601	Capacity: 90,888	Capacity: 82,500	Capacity: 82,000	Capacity: 80,000
Charlotte	Location of the host cities of the 2018 International Champions Cup in the United States.			San Diego
Bank of America Stadium	Location of the host cities of the 2018 International Champions Cup in the United States.			SDCCU Stadium
Capacity: 75,525	Location of the host cities of the 2018 International Champions Cup in the United States.			Capacity: 70,561
Pittsburgh	Location of the host cities of the 2018 International Champions Cup in the United States.			Philadelphia
Heinz Field	Location of the host cities of the 2018 International Champions Cup in the United States.			Lincoln Financial Field
Capacity: 69,690	Location of the host cities of the 2018 International Champions Cup in the United States.			Capacity: 69,176
Santa Clara (San Francisco Bay Area)	Location of the host cities of the 2018 International Champions Cup in the United States.			Minneapolis
Levi's Stadium	Location of the host cities of the 2018 International Champions Cup in the United States.			U.S. Bank Stadium
Capacity: 68,500	Location of the host cities of the 2018 International Champions Cup in the United States.			Capacity: 66,655
Miami Gardens (Miami Area)	Chicago	Carson (Los Angeles Area)	Harrison (New York City Area)	
Hard Rock Stadium	Soldier Field	StubHub Center	Red Bull Arena	
Capacity: 64,767	Capacity: 61,500	Capacity: 27,000	Capacity: 26,104	

Europe

Madrid	Dublin	London	Lecce
Estadio Wanda Metropolitano	Aviva Stadium	Stamford Bridge	Stadio Via del Mare
Capacity: 67,703	Capacity: 51,700	Capacity: 41,631	Capacity: 40,670
Nice	Klagenfurt	Faro/Loulé	
Allianz Riviera	Wörthersee Stadion	Estádio Algarve	
Capacity: 35,624	Capacity: 32,000	Capacity: 30,305	
Location of the host cities of the 2018 International Champions Cup in Europe.

Singapore

Singapore	Location of the host city of the 2018 International Champions Cup in Singapore.
Singapore National Stadium	Location of the host city of the 2018 International Champions Cup in Singapore.
Capacity: 55,000	Location of the host city of the 2018 International Champions Cup in Singapore.

== Matches ==
The match schedule was announced on April 17, 2018, and was updated on June 18 after Lyon replaced Sevilla. Each team played three matches, for a total of 27 matches.

July 20, 2018
20:05 CDT

Manchester City (England)	0–1	(Germany) Borussia Dortmund
	Report	Götze 28' (pen.)

Soldier Field, Chicago
Attendance: 34,629
Referee: Armando Villarreal (United States)

July 21, 2018
16:05 CEST
Audi Football Summit

Bayern Munich (Germany)	3–1	(France) Paris Saint-Germain
Martínez 60'; Sanches 68'; Zirkzee 78'	Report	Weah 31'

Wörthersee Stadion, Klagenfurt
Attendance: 22,300
Referee: Alexander Harkam (Austria)

July 22, 2018
16:05 EDT

Liverpool (England)	1–3	(Germany) Borussia Dortmund
Van Dijk 25'	Report	Pulisic 66' (pen.), 89'; Bruun Larsen 90+3'

Bank of America Stadium, Charlotte
Attendance: 55,447
Referee: Allen Chapman (United States)

July 25, 2018
19:05 EDT

Juventus (Italy)	2–0	(Germany) Bayern Munich
Favilli 32', 40'	Report

Lincoln Financial Field, Philadelphia
Attendance: 32,105
Referee: Chris Penso (United States)

July 25, 2018
20:05 EDT

Borussia Dortmund (Germany)	2–2	(Portugal) Benfica
Philipp 20', 22'	Report	Almeida 51'; Semedo 69'
Penalties
Wolf (penalty scored); Gómez (penalty missed); Burnić (penalty scored); Sancho (penalty scored); Isak (penalty missed)	3–4	(penalty scored) Lema; (penalty scored) Jonas; (penalty scored) Ferreyra; (penalty missed) Samaris; (penalty scored) Salvio

Heinz Field, Pittsburgh
Attendance: 16,171
Referee: Nima Saghafi (United States)

July 25, 2018
20:00 EDT

Manchester City (England)	1–2	(England) Liverpool
Sané 57'	Report	Salah 63'; Mané 90+4' (pen.)

MetLife Stadium, East Rutherford
Attendance: 52,635
Referee: Sorin Stoica (United States)

July 25, 2018
19:05 PDT

Roma (Italy)	1–4	(England) Tottenham Hotspur
Schick 3'	Report	Llorente 9', 18'; Lucas 28', 44'

SDCCU Stadium, San Diego
Attendance: 18,861
Referee: Alejandro Mariscal (United States)

July 25, 2018
20:05 PDT

Milan (Italy)	1–1	(England) Manchester United
Suso 15'	Report	Sánchez 12'
Penalties
Çalhanoğlu (penalty scored); Borini (penalty missed); Kessié (penalty scored); Suso (penalty missed); Reina (penalty scored); Romagnoli (penalty missed); Calabria (penalty scored); Kalinić (penalty scored); Musacchio (penalty scored); Mauri (penalty missed); Antonelli (penalty scored); Çalhanoğlu (penalty scored); Kessié (penalty missed)	8–9	(penalty scored) A. Pereira; (penalty scored) Herrera; (penalty scored) Sánchez; (penalty missed) McTominay; (penalty missed) J. Pereira; (penalty missed) Bailly; (penalty scored) Smalling; (penalty scored) Tuanzebe; (penalty scored) Fosu-Mensah; (penalty missed) Hamilton; (penalty scored) Darmian; (penalty scored) A. Pereira; (penalty scored) Herrera

StubHub Center, Carson
Attendance: 21,742
Referee: Baldomero Toledo (United States)

July 26, 2018
19:35 SGT

Atlético Madrid (Spain)	1–1	(England) Arsenal
Vietto 41'	Report	Smith Rowe 47'
Penalties
Correa (penalty missed); Rodri (penalty scored); Garcés (penalty missed); Mollejo (penalty scored); Adán (penalty scored)	3–1	(penalty missed) Mkhitaryan; (penalty missed) Willock; (penalty scored) Maitland-Niles; (penalty missed) Nketiah

Singapore National Stadium, Singapore
Attendance: 23,095
Referee: Ahmad A'Qashah (Singapore)

July 28, 2018
19:35 SGT

Arsenal (England)	5–1	(France) Paris Saint-Germain
Özil 13'; Lacazette 67', 71'; Holding 87'; Nketiah 90+4'	Report	Nkunku 60' (pen.)

Singapore National Stadium, Singapore
Attendance: 50,308
Referee: Nathan Chan (Singapore)

July 28, 2018
13:05 EDT

Benfica (Portugal)	1–1	(Italy) Juventus
Grimaldo 65'	Report	Clemenza 84'
Penalties
Parks (penalty scored); Jonas (penalty missed); Samaris (penalty scored); Félix (penalty missed)	2–4	(penalty scored) Fagioli; (penalty scored) Can; (penalty scored) Beltrame; (penalty scored) Alex Sandro

Red Bull Arena, Harrison
Attendance: 24,194
Referee: José Carlos Rivero (United States)

July 28, 2018
20:05 CEST

Chelsea (England)	1–1	(Italy) Inter Milan
Pedro 8'	Report	Gagliardini 49'
Penalties
Jorginho (penalty scored); Drinkwater (penalty scored); Moses (penalty scored); Abraham (penalty scored); Azpilicueta (penalty scored)	5–4	(penalty scored) Ranocchia; (penalty scored) Gagliardini; (penalty scored) Martínez; (penalty missed) Škriniar; (penalty scored) Karamoh

Allianz Riviera, Nice
Attendance: 8,000
Referee: Nicolas Rainville (France)

July 28, 2018
17:05 EDT
North West Derby

Manchester United (England)	1–4	(England) Liverpool
A. Pereira 31'	Report	Mané 28' (pen.); Sturridge 66'; Ojo 74' (pen.); Shaqiri 82'

Michigan Stadium, Ann Arbor
Attendance: 101,254
Referee: Ismail Elfath (United States)

July 28, 2018
19:05 EDT
Audi Football Summit

Bayern Munich (Germany)	2–3	(England) Manchester City
Shabani 15'; Robben 24'	Report	B. Silva 45+1', 70'; Nmecha 51'

Hard Rock Stadium, Miami Gardens
Attendance: 29,195
Referee: Ted Unkel (United States)

July 28, 2018
20:05 PDT

Barcelona (Spain)	2–2	(England) Tottenham Hotspur
Munir 15'; Arthur 29'	Report	Son Heung-min 73'; Nkoudou 75'
Penalties
Palencia (penalty scored); Ruiz (penalty scored); Monchu (penalty scored); Puig (penalty scored); Malcom (penalty scored)	5–3	(penalty scored) Son Heung-min; (penalty scored) Davies; (penalty missed) Georgiou; (penalty scored) Sánchez

Rose Bowl, Pasadena
Attendance: 66,805
Referee: Kevin Stott (United States)

July 30, 2018
19:35 SGT

Paris Saint-Germain (France)	3–2	(Spain) Atlético Madrid
Nkunku 32'; Diaby 71'; Postolachi 90+2'	Report	Mollejo 75'; Bernède 86' (o.g.)

Singapore National Stadium, Singapore
Attendance: 50,038
Referee: Muhammad Taqi Aljaafari Bin Jahari (Singapore)

July 31, 2018
20:05 EDT

Manchester United (England)	2–1	(Spain) Real Madrid
Sánchez 18'; Herrera 27'	Report	Benzema 45+3'

Hard Rock Stadium, Miami Gardens
Attendance: 64,141
Referee: Allen Chapman (United States)

July 31, 2018
19:35 CDT

Tottenham Hotspur (England)	1–0	(Italy) Milan
Nkoudou 47'	Report

U.S. Bank Stadium, Minneapolis
Attendance: 31,264
Referee: Ismail Elfath (United States)

July 31, 2018
21:05 CDT

Barcelona (Spain)	2–4	(Italy) Roma
Rafinha 6'; Malcom 49'	Report	El Shaarawy 35'; Florenzi 78'; Cristante 83'; Perotti 86' (pen.)

AT&T Stadium, Arlington
Attendance: 54,726
Referee: José Carlos Rivero (United States)

August 1, 2018
20:05 IST

Arsenal (England)	1–1	(England) Chelsea
Lacazette 90+3'	Report	Rüdiger 5'
Penalties
Lacazette (penalty scored); Nelson (penalty scored); Guendouzi (penalty scored); Maitland-Niles (penalty scored); Özil (penalty scored); Iwobi (penalty scored)	6–5	(penalty scored) Drinkwater; (penalty scored) Abraham; (penalty scored) Moses; (penalty scored) Emerson; (penalty scored) Piazon; (penalty missed) Loftus-Cheek

Aviva Stadium, Dublin
Attendance: 46,002
Referee: Paul McLaughlin (Republic of Ireland)

August 1, 2018
21:05 WEST
Eusébio Cup

Benfica (Portugal)	2–3	(France) Lyon
Pizzi 59'; Marcelo 64' (o.g.)	Report	Marcelo 40'; Traoré 45'; Terrier 83'

Estádio Algarve, Faro/Loulé
Attendance: 17,510
Referee: Hélder Malheiro (Portugal)

August 4, 2018
20:00 CEST

Inter Milan (Italy)	1–0	(France) Lyon
Martínez 52'	Report

Stadio Via del Mare, Lecce
Attendance: 24,698
Referee: Marco Di Bello (Italy)

August 4, 2018
18:05 EDT

Real Madrid (Spain)	3–1	(Italy) Juventus
Bale 39'; Asensio 47', 56'	Report	Carvajal 12' (o.g.)

FedExField, Landover
Attendance: 71,597
Referee: Robert Sibiga (United States)

August 4, 2018
17:05 PDT

Milan (Italy)	1–0	(Spain) Barcelona
Silva 90+3'	Report

Levi's Stadium, Santa Clara
Attendance: 51,391
Referee: Baldomero Toledo (United States)

August 7, 2018
20:05 BST

Chelsea (England)	0–0	(France) Lyon
	Report
Penalties
Jorginho (penalty scored); Barkley (penalty scored); Alonso (penalty scored); Azpilicueta (penalty scored); Hazard (penalty scored)	5–4	(penalty scored) Ferri; (penalty scored) Marcelo; (penalty scored) Gouiri; (penalty scored) Tete; (penalty missed) Diop

Stamford Bridge, London
Attendance: 18,457
Referee: Paul Tierney (England)

August 7, 2018
20:05 EDT

Real Madrid (Spain)	2–1	(Italy) Roma
Asensio 2'; Bale 15'	Report	Strootman 83'

MetLife Stadium, East Rutherford
Attendance: 51,528
Referee: Mark Geiger (United States)

August 11, 2018
21:05 CEST

Atlético Madrid (Spain)	0–1	(Italy) Inter Milan
	Report	Martínez 31'

Estadio Wanda Metropolitano, Madrid
Attendance: 23,427
Referee: Alejandro Hernández Hernández (Spain)

== Table ==
The 18 teams were ranked based on results from their three matches, with the best-ranked team being crowned champions. In addition to three points for a win and none for a loss, a penalty shoot-out win was worth two points, while a loss on penalties earned one point.

Pos	Team	Pld	W	PW	PL	L	GF	GA	GD	Pts	Final result
1	(England) Tottenham Hotspur (C)	3	2	0	1	0	7	3	+4	7	2018 International Champions Cup winners
2	(Germany) Borussia Dortmund	3	2	0	1	0	6	3	+3	7	
3	(Italy) Inter Milan	3	2	0	1	0	3	1	+2	7	
4	(England) Arsenal	3	1	1	1	0	7	3	+4	6	
5	(England) Liverpool	3	2	0	0	1	7	5	+2	6	
6	(Spain) Real Madrid	3	2	0	0	1	6	4	+2	6	
7	(Italy) Juventus	3	1	1	0	1	4	4	0	5	
8	(England) Chelsea	3	0	2	1	0	2	2	0	5	
9	(England) Manchester United	3	1	1	0	1	4	6	−2	5	
10	(France) Lyon	3	1	0	1	1	3	3	0	4	
11	(Italy) Milan	3	1	0	1	1	2	2	0	4	
12	(Portugal) Benfica	3	0	1	1	1	5	6	−1	3 (Note: Points against common opponent (Juventus): Benfica 1, Bayern Munich 0.)	
13	(Germany) Bayern Munich	3	1	0	0	2	5	6	−1	3	
14	(England) Manchester City	3	1	0	0	2	4	5	−1	3	
15	(Italy) Roma	3	1	0	0	2	6	8	−2	3	
16	(France) Paris Saint-Germain	3	1	0	0	2	5	10	−5	3	
17	(Spain) Atlético Madrid	3	0	1	0	2	3	4	−1	2	
18	(Spain) Barcelona	3	0	1	0	2	4	7	−3	2	

Source: ICC
Rules for classification: 1) Points; 2) Head-to-head points; 3) Goal differential; 4) Goals scored; 5) Result against common opponent; 6) Fewer red cards; 7) Fewer yellow cards; 8) Fewer fouls committed; 9) Coin flip.
(C) Champion

== Media coverage ==
Market	Countries	Broadcast partner	Ref
Arab World	1	beIN Sports	
Brazil	1	Fox Sports Brasil; Record News	
Canada	1	DAZN	
Germany	1	Onefootball (free-streaming), DAZN (pay-streaming), and Sport1 (free-TV)	
Indonesia	1	TVRI, iNews TV, and MNC Vision	
Iran	1	IRIB Varzesh	
Russia	1	Match TV	
Spain	1	beIN Sports (Spain)	
Sweden	1	MTG	
Tajikistan	1	TV Varzish	
Thailand	1	PPTV	
Turkey	1	D-Smart	
United Kingdom	1	Premier Sports (non-Liverpool/Manchester United matches); LFC TV (Liverpool matches only); MUTV (Manchester United matches only)	
United States	1	ESPN	
Vietnam	1	K+	

== See also ==
- 2018 Women's International Champions Cup
