= Mario González (footballer, born 1996) =

Spanish footballer

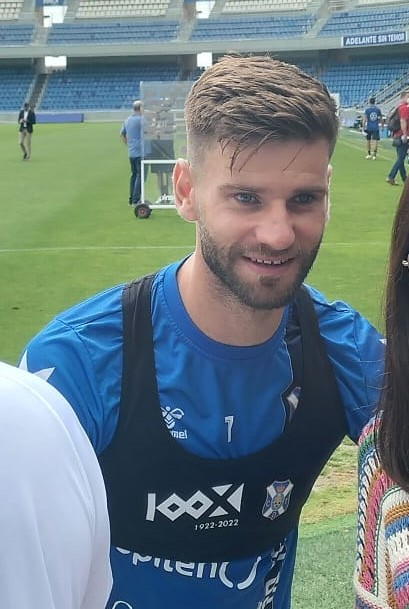
- González training with Tenerife

Personal information
- Full name: Mario González Gutiérrez
- Date of birth: 25 February 1996 (age 30)
- Place of birth: Villarcayo, Spain
- Height: 1.84 m (6 ft 0 in)
- Positions: Forward; winger

Team information
- Current team: Noah
- Number: 9

Youth career
- Villarcayo Nela
- Burgos
- Atlético Madrid
- 2012–2015: Villarreal

Senior career*
| Years | Team | Apps | (Gls) |
| 2014–2016 | Villarreal C | 57 | (25) |
| 2015–2019 | Villarreal B | 86 | (16) |
| 2016–2017 | Villarreal | 4 | (0) |
| 2019–2020 | Clermont | 18 | (3) |
| 2020–2021 | Villarreal | 0 | (0) |
| 2020–2021 | → Tondela (loan) | 27 | (15) |
| 2021–2023 | Braga | 14 | (2) |
| 2022 | → Tenerife (loan) | 16 | (6) |
| 2022–2023 | → OH Leuven (loan) | 22 | (13) |
| 2023–2025 | Los Angeles FC | 11 | (1) |
| 2024 | → Sporting Gijón (loan) | 18 | (2) |
| 2024–2025 | → Famalicão (loan) | 16 | (2) |
| 2025 | → Lech Poznań (loan) | 6 | (1) |
| 2025–2026 | Burgos | 25 | (4) |
| 2026– | Noah | 9 | (1) |

International career
| 2013 | Spain U17 | 3 | (1) |
- * Club domestic league appearances and goals as of 01:05, 12 November 2026 (UTC)

Mario González Gutiérrez (Spanish pronunciation: [ˈmaɾjo ɣonˈθaleθ]; born 25 February 1996) is a Spanish professional footballer who plays mainly as a forward but also as a winger for Armenian Premier League club Noah.

== Club career ==
=== Villarreal ===
Born in Villarcayo de Merindad de Castilla la Vieja, Province of Burgos, Castile and León, González joined Villarreal CF's youth system in 2012. On 30 August 2014, he made his senior debut for the C team, starting in a 3–1 home loss against CD Castellón in the Tercera División.

González scored his first senior goal on 5 October 2014, the third in a 4–0 home victory over FC Jove Español San Vicente. He added a brace against Orihuela CF on 14 December, two more against UD Benigànim and Ontinyent CF in the following season, and a hat-trick in a 6–1 rout of CD Acero on 28 November 2015.

González made his first-team debut on 17 August 2016, coming on as a second-half substitute for Rafael Santos Borré in a 2–1 home loss to AS Monaco FC in the play-off round of the UEFA Champions League. His first match in La Liga was three days later, when he replaced Alexandre Pato in the 1–1 draw at Granada CF.

In July 2019, González signed a one-year deal with French Ligue 2 club Clermont Foot. A year later, after exercising an option in his contract, he returned to Villarreal on a two-year deal.

González went on loan to Portugal's C.D. Tondela in the summer of 2020. He scored a career-best 15 times during his spell (ranking fourth in the Primeira Liga individual charts for the campaign), including three in 12 minutes in a 3–2 away win against Moreirense FC.

=== Braga ===
On 1 July 2021, González joined S.C. Braga of the same country and league on a four-year contract, for a reported €1.5 million. The following 31 January, he returned to his home country after agreeing to a six-month loan with CD Tenerife.

González was loaned to Belgian Pro League side Oud-Heverlee Leuven for 2022–23, with an option to buy. Although he scored 15 goals in 24 appearances in all competitions, the clause was not exercised and he returned to the Estádio Municipal de Braga.

=== Los Angeles FC ===
On 22 July 2023, Braga sold González to Major League Soccer club Los Angeles FC for a reported fee of €2.3 million. He scored his only goal on 26 August, in a 2–1 defeat at Charlotte FC.

González returned to the Spanish Segunda División in January 2024, on a five-month loan at Sporting de Gijón. On 2 August that year, also on loan, he joined F.C. Famalicão with a purchase option.

On 11 February 2025, González was loaned to Ekstraklasa's Lech Poznań until the end of the season. Despite limited minutes, he played a crucial role in the latter stage of a title-winning campaign, scoring an equaliser in a 2–2 draw against GKS Katowice on 18 May to keep his team at the top of the table prior to the last matchday, where he cleared the ball in injury time of the 1–0 win over Piast Gliwice.

=== Later career ===
On 13 August 2025, González returned to Spain and signed a one-year contract with Burgos CF as a free agent. He went back abroad in June 2026, with FC Noah of the Armenian Premier League.

== Career statistics ==
As of match played 24 May 2025

Appearances and goals by club, season and competition
| Club | Season | League | | | National cup (Note: Includes Coupe de France, Taça de Portugal and Belgian Cup) | | League cup (Note: Includes Coupe de la Ligue and Taça da Liga) | | Continental | | Other | | Total | |
| Club | Season | Division | Apps | Goals | Apps | Goals | Apps | Goals | Apps | Goals | Apps | Goals | Apps | Goals |
|---|---|---|---|---|---|---|---|---|---|---|---|---|---|---|
| Villarreal C | 2013–14 | Tercera División | 5 | 1 | — | | — | | — | | — | | 5 | 1 |
| Villarreal C | 2014–15 | Tercera División | 24 | 9 | — | | — | | — | | — | | 24 | 9 |
| Villarreal C | 2015–16 | Tercera División | 28 | 15 | — | | — | | — | | — | | 28 | 15 |
| Villarreal C | Total | | 57 | 25 | — | | — | | — | | — | | 57 | 25 |
| Villarreal B | 2015–16 | Segunda División B | 10 | 0 | — | | — | | — | | — | | 10 | 0 |
| Villarreal B | 2016–17 | Segunda División B | 32 | 5 | — | | — | | — | | — | | 32 | 5 |
| Villarreal B | 2017–18 | Segunda División B | 22 | 4 | — | | — | | — | | 6 (Note: Appearances in Segunda División B play-offs) | 0 | 28 | 4 |
| Villarreal B | 2018–19 | Segunda División B | 22 | 7 | — | | — | | — | | 2 | 1 | 24 | 8 |
| Villarreal B | Total | | 86 | 16 | — | | — | | — | | 8 | 1 | 94 | 17 |
| Villarreal | 2016–17 | La Liga | 2 | 0 | 0 | 0 | — | | 1 (Note: Appearance in UEFA Champions League) | 0 | — | | 3 | 0 |
| Villarreal | 2017–18 | La Liga | 2 | 0 | 0 | 0 | — | | 1 (Note: Appearances in UEFA Europa League) | 0 | — | | 3 | 0 |
| Villarreal | Total | | 4 | 0 | 0 | 0 | — | | 2 | 0 | — | | 6 | 0 |
| Clermont | 2019–20 | Ligue 2 | 18 | 3 | 1 | 0 | 2 | 1 | — | | — | | 21 | 4 |
| Villarreal | 2020–21 | La Liga | 0 | 0 | 0 | 0 | — | | 0 | 0 | — | | 0 | 0 |
| Tondela (loan) | 2020–21 | Primeira Liga | 27 | 15 | 1 | 0 | — | | — | | — | | 28 | 15 |
| Braga | 2021–22 | Primeira Liga | 14 | 2 | 3 | 1 | 1 | 0 | 6 | 1 | 1 (Note: Appearance in Supertaça Cândido de Oliveira) | 0 | 25 | 4 |
| Tenerife (loan) | 2021–22 | Segunda División | 16 | 6 | 0 | 0 | — | | — | | 4 (Note: Appearances in Segunda División play-offs) | 0 | 20 | 6 |
| OH Leuven (loan) | 2022–23 | Belgian Pro League | 22 | 13 | 2 | 2 | — | | — | | — | | 24 | 15 |
| Los Angeles FC | 2023 | Major League Soccer | 8 | 1 | 0 | 0 | — | | — | | 4 (Note: Three appearances in MLS Cup playoffs, one appearance in Leagues Cup) | 0 | 12 | 1 |
| Sporting Gijón (loan) | 2023–24 | Segunda División | 18 | 2 | 0 | 0 | — | | — | | 2 | 0 | 20 | 2 |
| Famalicão (loan) | 2024–25 | Primeira Liga | 16 | 2 | 2 | 0 | — | | — | | — | | 18 | 2 |
| Lech Poznań (loan) | 2024–25 | Ekstraklasa | 6 | 1 | — | | — | | — | | — | | 6 | 1 |
| Career total | | | 292 | 86 | 9 | 3 | 3 | 1 | 8 | 1 | 19 | 1 | 331 | 92 |

== Honours ==
Lech Poznań

- Ekstraklasa: 2024–25

Individual

- Primeira Liga Forward of the Month: April 2021
