= Kuku (footballer) =

Spanish footballer (born 1989)

Personal information
- Full name: Mamadou Kanteh Danjo
- Date of birth: 27 August 1989 (age 37)
- Place of birth: Calella, Spain
- Height: 1.85 m (6 ft 1 in)
- Position: Striker

Team information
- Current team: Palamós

Youth career
- Pineda de Mar
- Blanes

Senior career*
Years	Team	Apps	(Gls)
2008–2009	Blanes	6	(1)
2009–2010	Olímpic Malgrat		
2010–2011	Tossa		
2011	Lloret	6	(0)
2011–2014	Poble Nou	81	(100)
2014–2016	Júpiter	55	(42)
2016–2017	Wigry Suwałki	8	(0)
2017–2019	Sant Andreu	41	(11)
2019–2020	Llagostera	23	(3)
2020–2021	Sant Andreu	18	(5)
2021–2022	Prat	26	(6)
2022	Cerdanyola del Vallès	11	(1)
2022	Vilassar de Mar	3	(0)
2023–	Palamós		
- * Club domestic league appearances and goals as of 27 August 2024

Mamadou Kanteh Danjo (born 27 August 1989), commonly known as Kuku, is a Spanish footballer who plays for Palamós as a striker.

== Club career ==
Born in Calella, Barcelona, Catalonia, to Gambian parents, Kuku finished his formation with CD Blanes. After making his senior debut with the first team in the Tercera División, he went on to resume his career in the regional leagues, representing CE Olímpic Malgrat, UE Tossa, CF Lloret and UE Poble Nou 2000.

In 2014, Kuku joined CE Júpiter in Primera Catalana, being the club's top goalscorer during his two-year spell and achieving promotion to the fourth division. In June 2016, he moved abroad for the first time in his career, after agreeing to a contract with I liga side Wigry Suwałki.

Kuku made his professional debut on 5 August 2016, coming on as a second-half substitute for Łukasz Wroński in a 2–1 home win against Znicz Pruszków. He struggled with injuries during his spell abroad, contributing with only eight league appearances, all from the bench.

On 17 July 2017, Kuku returned to Spain and its fourth division, after joining UE Sant Andreu. On 1 July 2019, he moved to UE Llagostera of the Segunda División B.

== Personal life ==
Kuku's younger brother Tamba is also a footballer. A winger, both played together as a senior at Poble Nou.
