= Aitor Sanz =

Spanish footballer

Personal information
- Full name: Aitor Sanz Martín
- Date of birth: 13 September 1984 (age 42)
- Place of birth: Madrid, Spain
- Height: 1.81 m (5 ft 11 1/2 in)
- Position: Midfielder

Youth career
- 2001–2002: SS Reyes

Senior career*
Years	Team	Apps	(Gls)
2002–2006	SS Reyes	118	(3)
2006–2008	Zamora	67	(6)
2008–2010	Real Unión	53	(2)
2010–2013	Oviedo	94	(3)
2013–2026	Tenerife	383	(13)
Total		715	(27)
- * Club domestic league appearances and goals

Aitor Sanz Martín (born 13 September 1984) is a Spanish former professional footballer who played as a central midfielder.

He amassed Segunda División totals of 383 games and 11 goals over 13 seasons, in service of Real Unión and Tenerife.

== Club career ==
Sanz was born in Madrid. He spent the first six seasons of his senior career in the Segunda División B, with UD San Sebastián de los Reyes, Zamora CF and Real Unión. In 2008–09, he achieved promotion with the latter club.

Sanz played his first Segunda División match on 29 August 2009, featuring 90 minutes in a 0–1 home loss against Recreativo de Huelva. He made a further 26 appearances until the end of the campaign, being relegated as second-bottom.

Subsequently, Sanz remained in the third division after signing a one-year contract with Real Oviedo. He played 106 competitive games during his spell at the Estadio Carlos Tartiere, scoring in the 1–2 home defeat to SD Eibar in the 2013 promotion playoffs.

Sanz joined second-tier CD Tenerife in June 2013. He scored his first goal as a professional on 18 October 2014, but in a 3–2 loss at CA Osasuna.

Having missed the entire 2018–19 due to an Achilles tendon injury, Sanz remained in the Canary Islands until his retirement, all but in that league; three months shy of his 41st birthday, and shortly after the club's relegation to Primera Federación, he renewed his contract until June 2026.

Sanz was part of the squad that returned to the second division in 2025–26. He subsequently retired, immediately joining the technical staff of Álvaro Cervera.
