= Álex Corredera =

Spanish footballer

Alexandre Corredera
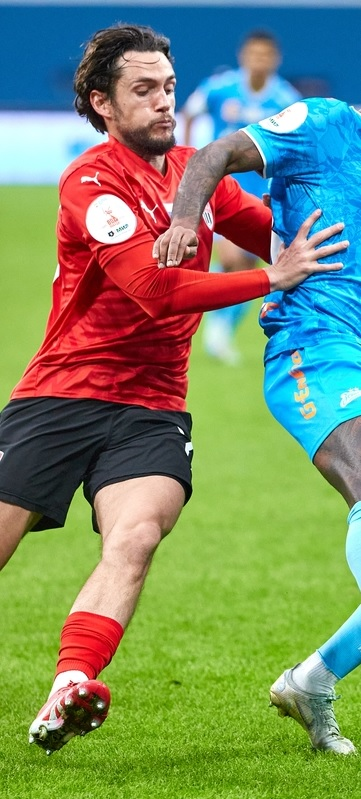
- Corredera with Khimki in 2025

Personal information
- Full name: Alexandre Corredera Alardi
- Date of birth: 19 March 1996 (age 30)
- Place of birth: Vic, Spain
- Height: 1.78 m (5 ft 10 in)
- Position: Attacking midfielder

Team information
- Current team: Sporting Gijón
- Number: 14

Youth career
- 2004–2015: Barcelona

Senior career*
| Years | Team | Apps | (Gls) |
| 2015–2017 | Deportivo B | 73 | (14) |
| 2017–2018 | Almería B | 34 | (10) |
| 2017–2018 | Almería | 3 | (0) |
| 2018–2019 | Murcia | 19 | (0) |
| 2019 | Valencia B | 17 | (0) |
| 2019–2021 | Badajoz | 47 | (12) |
| 2021–2024 | Tenerife | 108 | (3) |
| 2024–2025 | Khimki | 22 | (0) |
| 2025– | Sporting Gijón | 39 | (1) |
- * Club domestic league appearances and goals as of 6 June 2026

Alexandre Corredera Alardi (born 19 March 1996) is a Spanish footballer who plays as an attacking midfielder for Sporting de Gijón.

== Club career ==
Born in Vic, Barcelona, Catalonia, Corredera joined FC Barcelona's youth setup in 2004 at the age of eight. On 1 July 2015, he signed a two-year deal with Deportivo de La Coruña, being initially assigned to the reserves in the Tercera División.

Corredera made his senior debut on 23 August 2015, starting in a 1–0 Tercera División away win against CD Boiro. Seven days later he scored his first goal, netting the first in a 2–2 home draw against Arosa SC.

On 9 July 2017, free agent Corredera moved to another reserve team, UD Almería B also in the fourth level. On 24 September, he scored a hat-trick in a 4–0 home routing of Villacarrillo CF.

Corredera made his first-team debut on 22 October 2017, coming on as a substitute for Nauzet Alemán in a 0–1 home loss against CF Reus Deportiu in the Segunda División. The following 3 July, he joined Real Murcia in Segunda División B.

On 16 January 2019, Corredera moved to Valencia CF Mestalla of the third division, after terminating his contract with Murcia. On 18 July 2019, he signed for CD Badajoz in the same category.

On 2 June 2021, after scoring a career-best 10 goals in the 2020–21 season, Corredera signed a three-year contract with CD Tenerife of the second division. On his club debut on 15 August, he scored a last-minute winner in a 2–1 away win over CF Fuenlabrada; it was also his first professional goal.

On 12 September 2024, Corredera signed for Russian Premier League club FC Khimki. On 3 July of the following year, he returned to his home country after agreeing to a three-year deal with Sporting de Gijón in the second division.

== Honours ==
Barcelona

- UEFA Youth League: 2013–14
