= Víctor Olmo =

Spanish association football player

Personal information
- Full name: Víctor Olmo Durán
- Date of birth: 17 June 2001 (age 25)
- Place of birth: Jerez de la Frontera, Spain
- Height: 1.70 m (5 ft 7 in)
- Position: Left back

Team information
- Current team: Conil

Youth career
- 2013–2015: Cádiz
- 2016–2017: Balón de Cádiz
- 2017–2020: Málaga

Senior career*
Years	Team	Apps	(Gls)
2020–2021	Málaga C		
2020–2022	Málaga B	34	(2)
2021–2023	Málaga	6	(0)
2023–2024	Linense	10	(1)
2025–	Conil	9	(0)
- * Club domestic league appearances and goals as of 9 November 2025

Víctor Olmo Durán (born 17 June 2001) is a Spanish footballer who plays as a left back for Tercera Federación club Conil.

== Club career ==
Born in Jerez de la Frontera, Cádiz, Andalusia, Olmo represented Cádiz CF and Balón de Cádiz CF before joining Málaga CF's youth setup in 2017. After being initially assigned to the C-team in the regional leagues, he first appeared with the reserves on 18 October 2020, coming on as a second-half substitute for Loren Zúñiga in a 1–0 Tercera División home win over Juventud de Torremolinos CF.

Olmo scored his first senior goal on 16 March 2022, netting the B's equalizer in a 2–1 home success over Alhaurín de la Torre CF. He made his first team debut on 7 May, starting in a 0–0 home draw against Real Oviedo in the Segunda División.
