= Víctor Mollejo =

Spanish footballer (born 2001)

Victor Mollejo
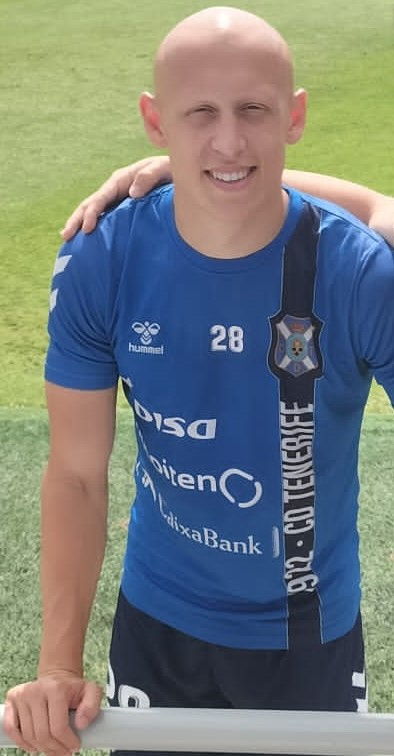
- Mollejo with Tenerife in 2022

Personal information
- Full name: Víctor Mollejo Carpintero
- Date of birth: 21 January 2001 (age 25)
- Place of birth: Alcázar de San Juan, Spain
- Height: 1.76 m (5 ft 9 in)
- Position: Winger

Team information
- Current team: Burgos
- Number: 11

Youth career
- Villa Don Fadrique
- 2010–2018: Atlético Madrid

Senior career*
Years	Team	Apps	(Gls)
2018–2025	Atlético Madrid B	40	(9)
2019–2025	Atlético Madrid	4	(0)
2019–2020	→ Deportivo La Coruña (loan)	36	(6)
2020–2021	→ Getafe (loan)	4	(0)
2021	→ Mallorca (loan)	10	(2)
2021–2022	→ Tenerife (loan)	37	(3)
2022–2024	→ Zaragoza (loan)	59	(7)
2025–	Burgos	32	(0)

International career
2017	Spain U16	3	(2)
2018	Spain U17	6	(1)
2019	Spain U18	1	(1)
2019–2020	Spain U19	13	(3)
- * Club domestic league appearances and goals as of 6 June 2026

Víctor Mollejo Carpintero (born 21 January 2001) is a Spanish professional footballer who plays as a right winger for Segunda División club Burgos.

== Club career ==
=== Atlético Madrid ===
==== 2010–2017: Early career ====
Born in Alcázar de San Juan, Ciudad Real but raised in Villa de Don Fadrique, Toledo, Mollejo joined Atlético Madrid's youth setup in 2010, from CD Villa. On 12 August 2017, he appeared with the first team in a pre-season friendly against CD Leganés, becoming the first player born in the 21st century to appear for the club.

==== 2018–19: Senior debut ====
Promoted to the reserves ahead of the 2018–19 season, Mollejo made his official senior debut on 26 August 2018, starting in a 1–1 Segunda División B away draw against AD Unión Adarve. His first goal occurred on 23 September, as he scored his team's third in a 4–2 win at CDA Navalcarnero.

Mollejo made his professional – and La Liga – debut on 19 January 2019, coming on as a late substitute for Thomas Lemar in a 3–0 away win.

==== 2019–20: Loan to Deportivo de La Coruña ====
On 2 September, he joined Segunda División side Deportivo de La Coruña on a season-long loan deal.

Mollejo scored his first professional goal on 18 September 2019, netting his team's first in a 3–3 home draw against CD Numancia. He was Dépor's second-best goalscorer during the campaign with six league goals, but his side was unable to avoid relegation.

==== 2020–21: Loans to Getafe and Mallorca ====
On 5 October 2020, Mollejo joined fellow top tier side Getafe CF on loan for the 2020–21 campaign. On 1 February 2021, after just four matches, his loan was cut short.

Immediately after leaving Getafe, Mollejo moved to second division club RCD Mallorca on loan for the remainder of the season.

==== 2021–22: Loan to Tenerife ====
On 31 August 2021, Mollejo moved to CD Tenerife also in the second level, on loan for one year.

==== 2022–23 and 2023–24: Loans to Zaragoza ====
On 18 July 2022, Mollejo agreed to a one-year loan deal with Real Zaragoza still in the second tier. On 3 August, his loan was extended for the 2023–24 season.

==== 2024–25: Back to the B-team ====
Mollejo returned to Atleti in July 2024, being assigned back at the B's in Primera Federación. In December 2024, however, he suffered a knee injury which sidelined him for the remainder of the campaign.

=== Burgos ===
On 4 August 2025, second division side Burgos CF reached an agreement with Atlético for the transfer of Mollejo, who signed a three-year contract with the club.

== Personal life ==
Since he was nine years old, Mollejo has had alopecia.

== Career statistics ==
=== Club ===
As of match played 24 November 2024

Appearances and goals by club, season and competition
Club	Season	League			Copa del Rey		Other		Total	
Club	Season	Division	Apps	Goals	Apps	Goals	Apps	Goals	Apps	Goals
Atlético Madrid B	2018–19	Segunda División B	28	6	—		2 (Note: Appearances in Segunda División B promotion play-offs)	0	30	6
Atlético Madrid B	2019–20	Segunda División B	1	0	—		—		1	0
Atlético Madrid B	2024–25	Primera Federación	11	3	—		—		11	3
Atlético Madrid B	Total		40	9	—		2	0	42	9
Atlético Madrid	2018–19	La Liga	4	0	0	0	—		4	0
Atlético Madrid	2020–21	La Liga	0	0	0	0	—		0	0
Atlético Madrid	Total		4	0	0	0	—		4	0
Deportivo La Coruña (loan)	2019–20	Segunda División	36	6	2	0	—		38	6
Getafe (loan)	2020–21	La Liga	4	0	0	0	—		4	0
Mallorca (loan)	2020–21	Segunda División	2	0	0	0	—		2	0
Tenerife (loan)	2021–22	Segunda División	41	3	2	1	—		43	4
Real Zaragoza (loan)	2022–23	Segunda División	28	3	1	0	—		29	3
Real Zaragoza (loan)	2023–24	Segunda División	27	4	1	1	—		28	5
Real Zaragoza (loan)	Total		55	7	2	1	—		57	8
Burgos	2025–26	Segunda División	0	0	0	0	—		0	0
Career total			182	25	6	2	2	0	190	27

== Honours ==
Spain U19

- UEFA European Under-19 Championship: 2019
