= Segovia (Baetica) =

Ancient city in the Roman province of Hispania Baetica

Segovia (Σεγουβία, Ptol. ii. 6. § 56) was an ancient city of the Roman province of Hispania Baetica, on the river Silicense (probably the modern Guadajoz. (Hirt. B. A. 57.) Its current location is in the neighborhood of Sacili or the modern Pedro Abad, Córdoba, Spain.

It is a possible site of the battle in 75 BCE where Metellus was victorious over the general of Sertorius, Hirtuleius. Hirtuleius died in the fighting
