= Ferran Tacón =

Spanish footballer

Personal information
- Full name: Ferran Tacón Jiménez
- Date of birth: 18 September 1986 (age 40)
- Place of birth: Mataró, Spain
- Height: 1.78 m (5 ft 10 in)
- Position: Midfielder

Youth career
- 2000–2001: Premià
- 2001–2005: Real Madrid

Senior career*
Years	Team	Apps	(Gls)
2005–2006	Real Madrid C	28	(5)
2006	Espanyol B	5	(0)
2007	Logroñés	11	(0)
2007–2009	Celta B	64	(12)
2008	Celta	1	(0)
2009–2010	Cultural Leonesa	36	(5)
2010–2011	Leganés	33	(7)
2011–2012	Tenerife	34	(3)
2012–2013	Alcoyano	34	(2)
2013	Badalona	9	(0)
2014	União Madeira	7	(0)
2014–2015	La Roda	19	(0)
2016	Eldense	10	(0)
2016	Al-Nasr		
2017	Masnou	11	(3)
2017–2018	Júpiter	21	(10)
2018	Horta	11	(2)
2019	FC Andorra	19	(3)
2019–2020	→ Horta (loan)	14	(4)
2020–2021	Gramenet		
2021	Júpiter	2	(0)
2021–2022	Caldes de Montbui	17	(1)
- * Club domestic league appearances and goals

Ferran Tacón Jiménez (born 18 September 1986) is a Spanish former footballer who played as a midfielder.
