= Álex Muñoz =

Spanish footballer (born 1994)

Personal information
- Full name: Alejandro José Muñoz Miquel
- Date of birth: 30 July 1994 (age 32)
- Place of birth: Sant Joan d'Alacant, Spain
- Height: 1.87 m (6 ft 2 in)
- Position: Defender

Team information
- Current team: Almería
- Number: 3

Youth career
- 2000–2003: Mutxamel
- 2003–2009: Alicante
- 2009–2013: Hércules

Senior career*
Years	Team	Apps	(Gls)
2012–2013	Hércules B	6	(0)
2012–2016	Hércules	64	(0)
2013–2014	Jove Español	22	(0)
2016–2018	Sevilla B	44	(3)
2018–2019	Zaragoza	16	(1)
2019–2022	Tenerife	94	(7)
2022–2024	Levante	67	(2)
2024–2025	Las Palmas	21	(3)
2025–	Almería	50	(4)
- * Club domestic league appearances and goals as of 21:55, 15 November 2026 (UTC)

Alejandro José "Álex" Muñoz Miquel (born 30 July 1994) is a Spanish professional footballer who plays as a centre-back or a left-back for Segunda División club Almería.

== Club career ==
Born in Sant Joan d'Alacant, Alicante, Valencian Community, Muñoz played youth football with local club Alicante CF from ages 9 to 15, and finished his development at neighbouring Hércules CF. In 2012, he was crowned under-18 champion with the Valencian Community autonomous team and, on 22 September of that year, while still a junior, he made his debut as a professional, coming on as a 73rd-minute substitute for Pepe Mora in a 0–3 Segunda División home loss against FC Barcelona B.

On 18 September 2013, Muñoz signed a new three-year contract, and was assigned to FC Jove Español San Vicente, the farm team in the Tercera División. On 19 August 2014 he agreed to an extension until 2018, being definitely promoted to the main squad now in the Segunda División B.

On 21 July 2016, Muñoz joined Sevilla FC on a three-year deal, but only represented their reserves. He scored his first goal in the second division on 19 August 2017, closing the 1–1 away draw with CA Osasuna.

Muñoz moved to second-tier Real Zaragoza in July 2018, also for three seasons. He terminated his contract after only one, however, and signed for CD Tenerife in the same league.

On 8 July 2022, Muñoz agreed to a two-year contract with Levante UD also in division two. In June 2024, he joined UD Las Palmas on a deal of the same duration. He made his La Liga debut on 16 August, featuring 68 minutes in a 2–2 home draw with Sevilla. He scored his first goal on 15 September, but in a 2–3 home loss to Athletic Bilbao.

On 4 July 2025, after suffering relegation, Muñoz signed a three-year contract with UD Almería.
