= José Segovia =

Spanish footballer

Personal information
- Full name: José Manuel Segovia Fernández
- Date of birth: 13 April 1991 (age 35)
- Place of birth: L'Hospitalet, Spain
- Height: 1.82 m (6 ft 0 in)
- Position: Goalkeeper

Team information
- Current team: Jijantes FC, de la Kings League
- Number: 1

Youth career
- 2007–2009: Hospitalet
- 2009–2010: Cornellà

Senior career*
| Years | Team | Apps | (Gls) |
| 2010–2012 | Villarreal C | 8 | (0) |
| 2011 | Villarreal B | 1 | (0) |
| 2011 | → Llagostera (loan) | 0 | (0) |
| 2012 | → Olot (loan) | 7 | (0) |
| 2012 | Montañesa | 0 | (0) |
| 2012–2013 | Santboià | 5 | (0) |
| 2013–2014 | Rubí | 34 | (0) |
| 2014–2015 | Cornellà | 23 | (0) |
| 2015 | Manlleu | 16 | (0) |
| 2016– | Sant Andreu | 88 | (0) |
- * Club domestic league appearances and goals as of 26 August 2018

José Manuel Segovia Fernández (born 13 April 1991) is a Spanish footballer who plays for Jijantes FC (Team in the Kings League) as a goalkeeper.

== Football career ==
Born in L'Hospitalet de Llobregat, Barcelona, Catalonia, Segovia finished his formation with UE Cornellà's youth setup. He moved to Villarreal CF in the summer of 2010, being assigned to the C-team of the Tercera División.

On 19 February 2011, Segovia played his first match as a professional, starting with the reserves in a 2–2 away draw against UD Las Palmas in the Segunda División. On 3 July he was loaned to Segunda División B club UE Llagostera, but after only acting as a backup he moved to UE Olot in November, also on loan.

In July 2012, Segovia signed for third-tier club Burgos CF, but left a month later alleging personal problems. He joined CF Montañesa in October, and continued to compete in the fourth tier in the following years, representing FC Santboià and UE Rubí.

On 12 June 2014, Segovia returned to Cornellà, newly promoted to the Segunda B.
