= Carlos Martínez (footballer, born 1997) =

Spanish footballer

Personal information
- Full name: Carlos Martínez Ruiz
- Date of birth: 3 July 1997 (age 29)
- Place of birth: Barcelona, Spain
- Height: 1.87 m (6 ft 2 in)
- Position: Forward

Team information
- Current team: Olot
- Number: 20

Youth career
- Mercantil
- 2003–2005: Espanyol
- 2005–2009: Barcelona
- 2009–2012: Damm
- 2012–2015: Mercantil
- 2015–2016: Sant Andreu

Senior career*
Years	Team	Apps	(Gls)
2015–2016	Sant Andreu	2	(0)
2016–2017	Llagostera B	?	(5)
2017–2018	Terrassa	21	(4)
2018–2019	Sant Andreu	30	(3)
2019–2020	Girona B	20	(9)
2020	Girona	0	(0)
2020–2021	Pobla Mafumet	29	(10)
2021–2023	Terrassa	44	(5)
2023–2024	Cerdanyola del Vallès	34	(5)
2024–2025	L'Hospitalet	20	(0)
2025	Europa	3	(0)
2025	Som Maresme	0	(0)
2025–2026	GIF Sundsvall	9	(2)
2026–	Olot	11	(0)
- * Club domestic league appearances and goals as of 15 May 2026

Carlos Martínez Ruiz (born 3 July 1997) is a Spanish professional footballer who plays for Segunda Federación club Olot as a forward.

== Club career ==
Born in Barcelona, Catalonia, Martínez represented CE Mercantil, RCD Espanyol, FC Barcelona, CF Damm and UE Sant Andreu as a youth. He made his senior debut with the latter during the 2015–16 season in Tercera División, before moving to UE Llagostera's reserves in April 2016.

On 14 June 2017, Martínez joined Terrassa FC in the fourth tier, but was sparingly used. Roughly one year later, he returned to Sant Andreu on a one-year deal.

Martínez refused a contract renewal with the Quadribarrats in June 2019, and subsequently joined Girona FC, being assigned to the B-team in the regional leagues. He made his first team debut on 11 January 2020; coming on as a late substitute for Jordi Calavera, he scored his team's fourth in a 4–2 Copa del Rey away win against FC Cartagena.

Martínez's professional debut occurred on 23 January 2020, as he replaced Brandon in a 0–3 home loss against Villarreal CF, also for the national cup. On 13 October, after helping Girona B in their first-ever promotion to the fourth tier, he signed for another reserve team, CF Pobla de Mafumet also in division four.

In July 2024, Martínez joined L'Hospitalet.
